= Gaunt Brothers Racing =

NASCAR team

- Owner: Marty Gaunt
- Base: Mooresville, North Carolina
- Series: NASCAR Cup Series
- Manufacturer: Toyota
- Opened: 2010
- Closed: 2021

Career
- Debut: NASCAR Cup Series: 2017 Daytona 500 (Daytona); Pinty's Series: 2010 Keystone Light 200 (Delaware)
- Latest race: NASCAR Cup Series: 2021 Hollywood Casino 400 (Kansas); Pinty's Series: 2011 NAPA Autopro 100 (Montreal)
- Races competed: Total: 94; NASCAR Cup Series: 81; Camping World Truck Series: 1 Pinty's Series: 12
- Drivers' Championships: Total: 0 NASCAR Cup Series: 0 Pinty's Series: 0
- Race victories: Total: 0 NASCAR Cup Series: 0 Pinty's Series: 0
- Pole positions: Total: 1 NASCAR Cup Series: 0 Pinty's Series: 1

Gaunt Brothers Racing was a Canadian professional stock car racing team that last competed in the NASCAR Cup Series in 2021. Gaunt Brothers Racing also competed in the Pinty's Series and the K&N Pro Series. The team was owned by Marty Gaunt, president and CEO of Triad Racing Technologies; GBR originally used engines from Triad before moving to Toyota Racing Development motors in alliance with Joe Gibbs Racing.

== NASCAR Cup Series ==
=== Car No. 96 history ===
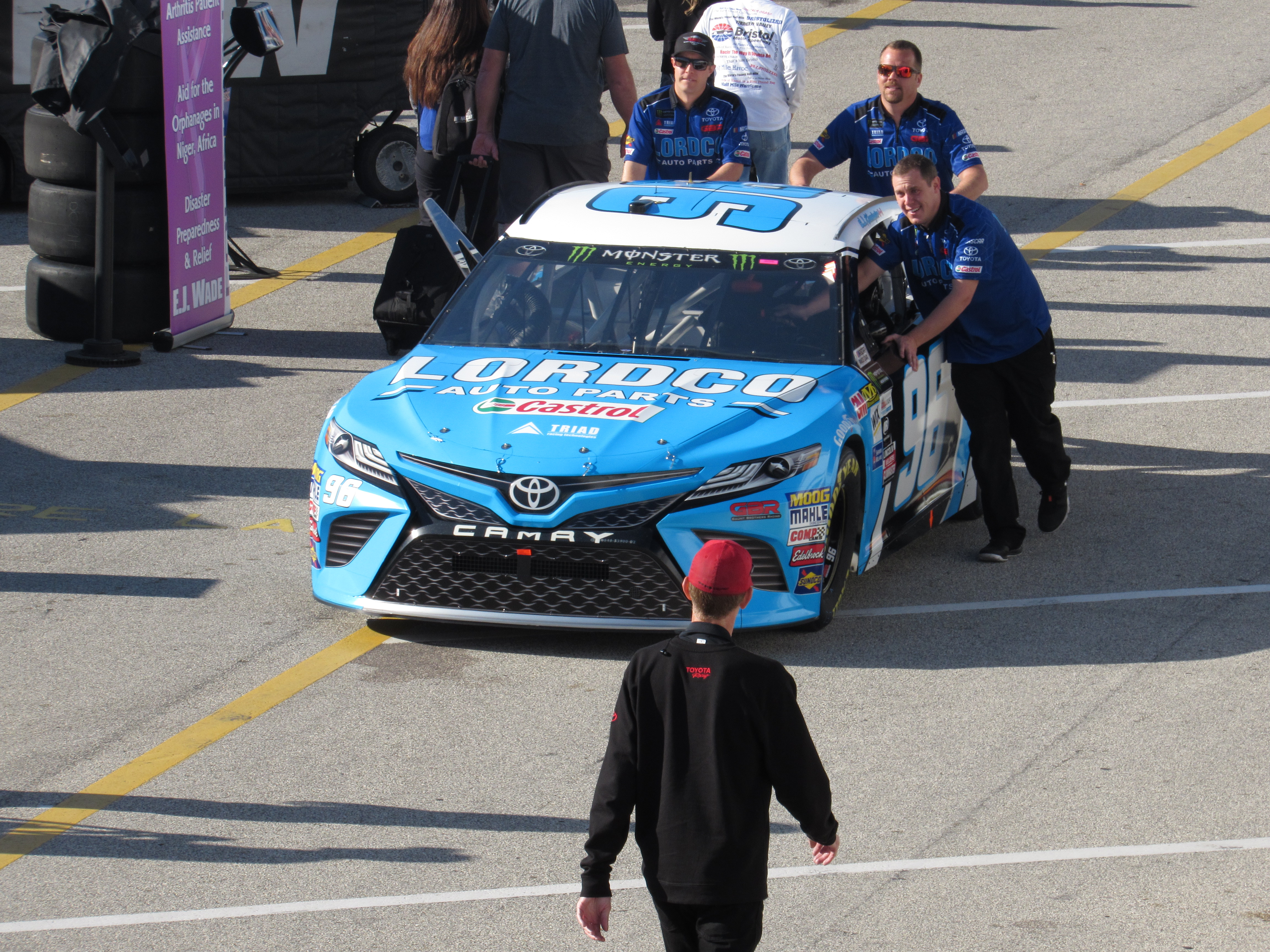
The team's No. 96 car at Daytona in 2017

On January 18, 2017, Gaunt Brothers Racing declared their plans to attempt the 2017 Daytona 500 with Canadian driver D. J. Kennington behind the wheel of the No. 96 Toyota Camry. The team was fielded in a partnership with RAB Racing. They planned to attempt all four superspeedway events in 2017. Kennington made the 59th annual Daytona 500, by passing Elliott Sadler at Cam-Am Duel 2. The team failed to finish the race after being involved in a crash just past halfway. The team returned to Talladega where they used ThorSport Racing's No. 98 hauler. The team failed to qualify. They didn't return to Daytona in July because Kennington joined Premium Motorsports, leaving the team without a driver.

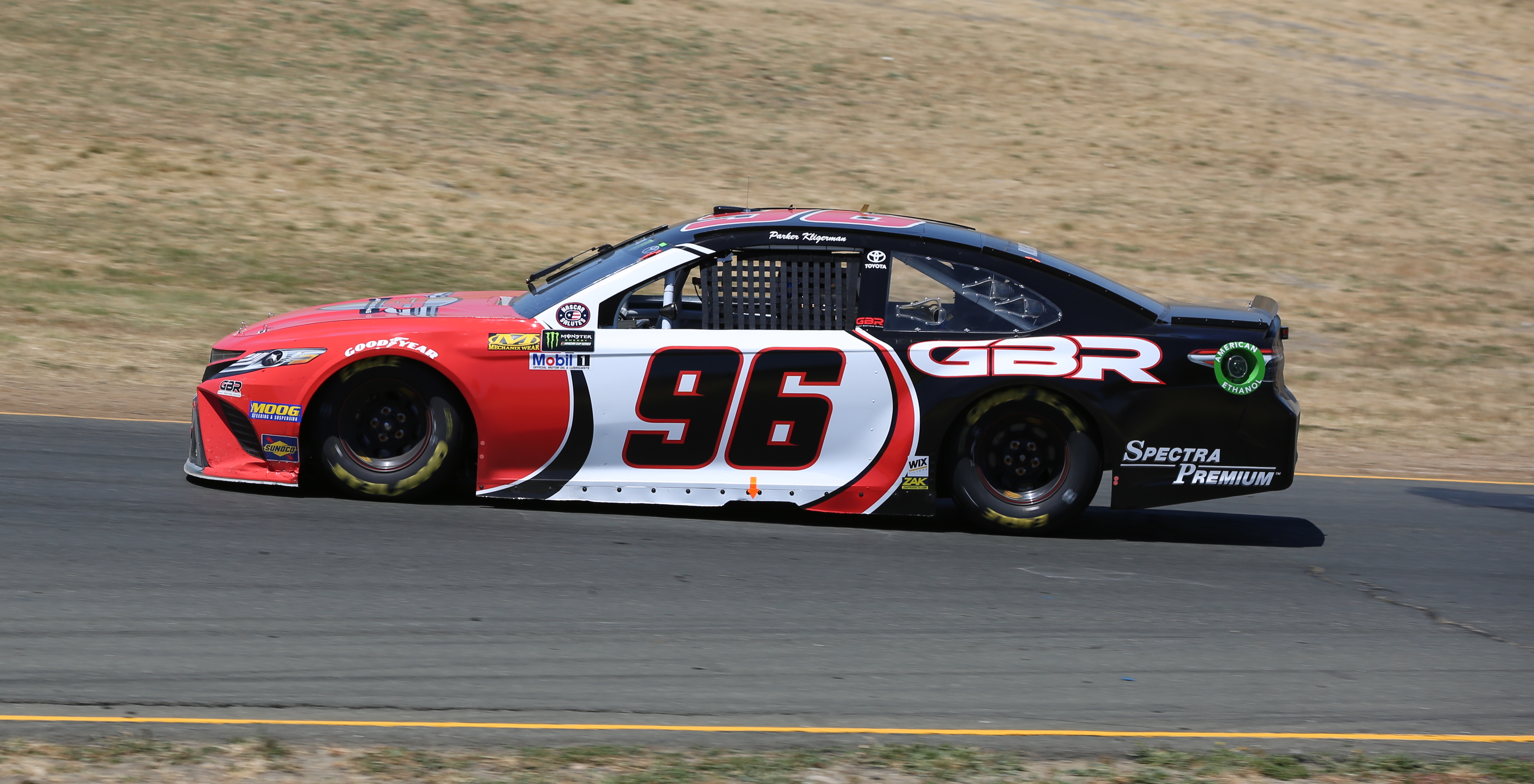
Parker Kligerman's No. 96 Toyota at Sonoma in 2018

However, the team, with Kennington, returned to Daytona in an attempt to qualify for a second straight 500 in 2018, guaranteed after only 40 showed up to try to get in the race. The team entered the spring ISM Raceway race, which would be their first appearance on a non-restrictor track, qualifying 34th. Parker Kligerman joined GBR for the Coca-Cola 600, his first Cup race since 2014. Jeffrey Earnhardt joined the team in August 2018 for 14 of the final 16 races. Jesse Little was announced to drive at the August Bristol night race. Earnhardt and GBR parted ways before the Martinsville race. He was replaced by Kennington at Martinsville and Kligerman at Texas.

Kligerman returned to the team in an attempt to qualify the Daytona 500 and drove the majority of the races during the 2019 NASCAR season that featured Gaunt Bros. Racing. Drew Herring came on board to drive the season finale at Homestead for the team.

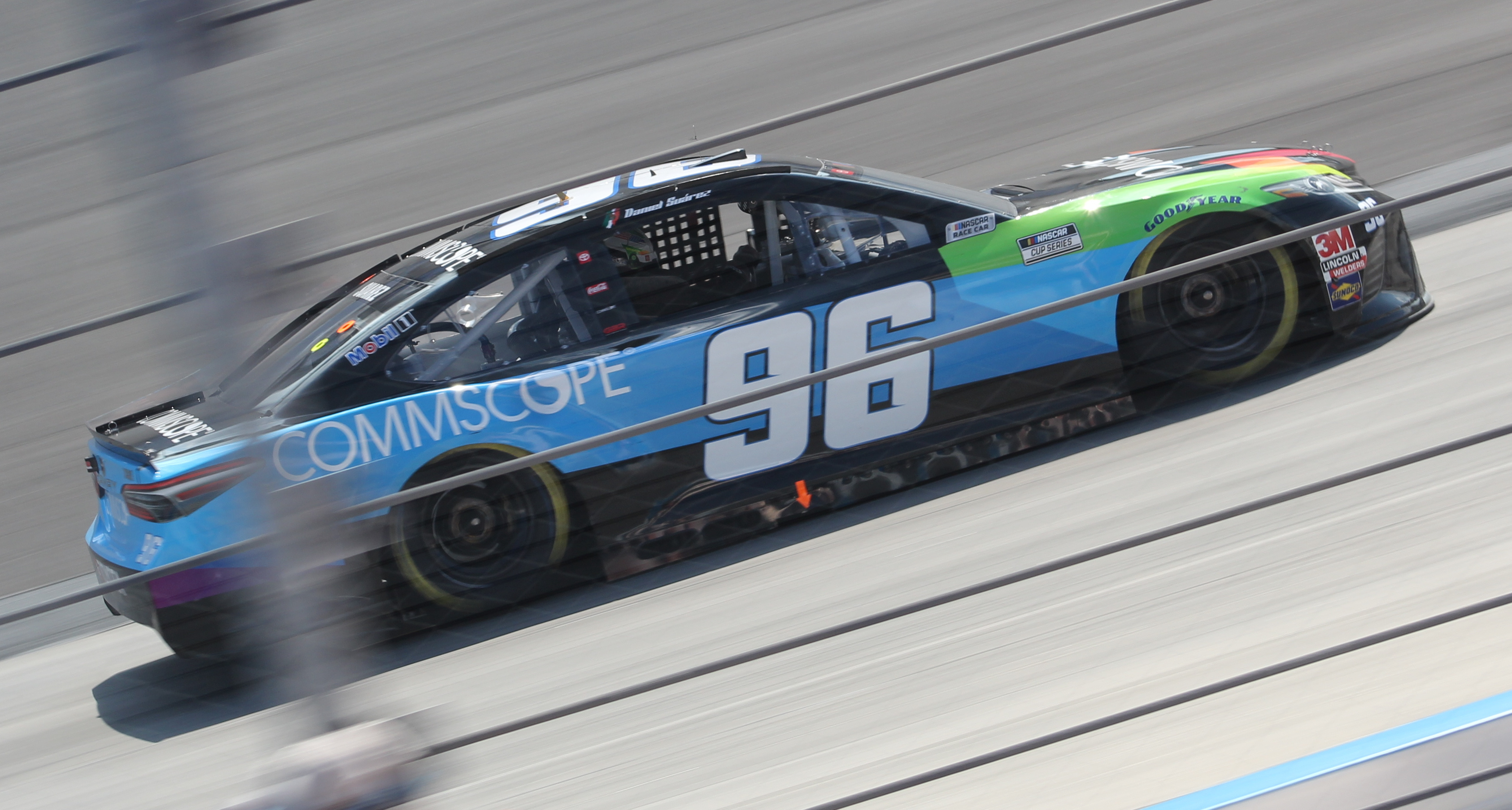
Suárez's No. 96 car at Dover International Speedway in 2020

On January 17, 2020, Kligerman announced that he has no plans to return to the No. 96 or in any of NASCAR's three national series. On January 28, Daniel Suárez officially signed with Gaunt Brothers Racing to race the No. 96 full-time in 2020. Despite Suárez's eligibility, the team did not participate in the 2020 Busch Clash to focus on the 2020 Daytona 500. The move came as GBR had a total of three chassis in the shop, some dating back to 2012 as Michael Waltrip Racing originals. Suárez failed to make the Daytona 500 after finishing 22nd in Duel 1 of the 2020 Bluegreen Vacations Duels when he collided with Ryan Blaney in turn 4. On September 15, Gaunt Brothers Racing and Suárez announced that they would be parting ways in 2021.

On January 19, 2021, it was announced that Ty Dillon would replace Daniel Suarez for the 2021 season. Despite finishing sixth in the first Duel of the 2021 Bluegreen Vacations Duels, Dillon missed the 2021 Daytona 500. On April 15, 2021, it was announced that Harrison Burton would make his Cup Series debut at Talladega. In this race, Burton would become the first driver born in the 2000s decade to run a Cup Series race. Landon Cassill would then drive the #96 for the next two Superspeedway races at Daytona and Talladega respectively finishing in 36th at Daytona and then 24th at Talladega. Parker Kligerman then would return to the team at Kansas giving the team its best run of the season with a 20th-place finish.

The team quietly ceased operations after the 2021 season.

==== Car No. 96 results ====
Year	Driver	No.	Make	1	2	3	4	5	6	7	8	9	10	11	12	13	14	15	16	17	18	19	20	21	22	23	24	25	26	27	28	29	30	31	32	33	34	35	36	Owners	Pts
2017	D. J. Kennington	96	Toyota	DAY; 36	ATL	LVS	PHO	CAL	MAR	TEX	BRI	RCH	TAL; DNQ	KAN	CLT	DOV	POC	MCH	SON	DAY	KEN	NHA	IND	POC	GLN	MCH	BRI	DAR	RCH	CHI	NHA	DOV	CLT	TAL	KAN	MAR	TEX	PHO	HOM	44th	1
2018	D. J. Kennington	96	Toyota	DAY; 24	ATL	LVS	PHO; 31	CAL	MAR; 28	TEX	BRI; 27	RCH	TAL; 20	DOV	KAN						DAY; 13	KEN	NHA													MAR; 27				37th	183
2018	Parker Kligerman	96	Toyota													CLT; 27	POC	MCH	SON; 23	CHI					GLN; 24												TEX; 31	PHO	HOM	37th	183
2018	Jeffrey Earnhardt	96	Toyota																					POC; 29		MCH; 39		DAR; 34	IND; 32	LVS; 25	RCH; 37	ROV; 26	DOV; 31	TAL; 37	KAN; 37					37th	183
2018	Jesse Little	96	Toyota																								BRI; 35													37th	183
2019	Parker Kligerman	96	Toyota	DAY; 15	ATL; 30	LVS; 31	PHO	CAL	MAR	TEX; 27	BRI	RCH	TAL; 27	DOV	KAN	CLT; 26	POC	MCH	SON; 30	CHI	DAY; 31	KEN	NHA	POC	GLN; 26	MCH	BRI	DAR	IND; 36	LVS	RCH	ROV; 26	DOV	TAL; 15	KAN; 29	MAR	TEX; 22	PHO		35th	155
2019	Drew Herring	96	Toyota																																				HOM; 29	35th	155
2020	Daniel Suárez	96	Toyota	DAY; DNQ	LVS; 30	CAL; 28	PHO; 21	DAR; 25	DAR; 27	CLT; 28	CLT; 28	BRI; 18	ATL; 31	MAR; 27	HOM; 31	TAL; 28	POC; 28	POC; 26	IND; 20	KEN; 26	TEX; 23	KAN; 18	NHA; 26	MCH; 24	MCH; 26	DRC; 27	DOV; 30	DOV; 28	DAY; 26	DAR; 25	RCH; 29	BRI; 26	LVS; 29	TAL; 34	ROV; 25	KAN; 27	TEX; 27	MAR; 27	PHO; 31	31st	365
2021	Ty Dillon	96	Toyota	DAY; DNQ	DRC; 19	HOM	LVS	PHO	ATL	BRD; 26	MAR	RCH					COA; 21	CLT	SON	NSH	POC	POC	ROA; 26	ATL	NHA	GLN	IRC	MCH												40th	110
2021	Harrison Burton	96	Toyota										TAL; 20	KAN	DAR	DOV																								40th	110
2021	Landon Cassill	96	Toyota																										DAY; 36	DAR	RCH	BRI	LVS	TAL; 24	ROV	TEX				40th	110
2021	Parker Kligerman	96	Toyota																																		KAN; 20	MAR	PHO	40th	110

== Camping World Truck Series ==
=== Truck No. 96 history ===
In August 2017, GBR and Kennington reunited to run the Truck race at Canadian Tire Motorsports Park, where Kennington drove the No. 96.

==== Truck No. 96 results ====
Year	Driver	No.	Make	1	2	3	4	5	6	7	8	9	10	11	12	13	14	15	16	17	18	19	20	21	22	23	NCWTC	Pts
2017	D. J. Kennington	96	Toyota	DAY	ATL	MAR	KAN	CLT	DOV	TEX	GTW	IOW	KEN	ELD	POC	MCH	BRI	MSP; 14	CHI	NHA	LVS	TAL	MAR	TEX	PHO	HOM		

== Pinty's Series ==
=== Car No. 11 history ===
The team announced its Pinty's Series involvement in May 2010, initially setting John Gaunt as driver of the No. 11 entry. Gaunt started seven of the twelve events in the series that year. In 2011, Jason Bowles joined the team for two races, winning the pole in one.

==== K&N Pro Series East ====
NASCAR K&N Pro Series East results
Year	Driver	No.	Make	1	2	3	4	5	6	7	8	9	10	11	12	NKNPSEC	Pts	Ref
2011	Jason Bowles	75	Toyota	GRE	SBO	RCH; 6	IOW	BGS	JFC	LGY	NHA	COL	GRE	NHA	DOV	53rd	150	
