= 2020 Federated Auto Parts 400 =

NASCAR Cup Series race

Race details
- Race 28 of 36 in the 2020 NASCAR Cup Series
- The 2020 Federated Auto Parts 400 program cover.
- Date: September 12, 2020
- Location: Richmond Raceway in Richmond, Virginia
- Course: Permanent racing facility
- Course length: .75 miles (1.2 km)
- Distance: 400 laps, 300 mi (480 km)
- Average speed: 101.868 miles per hour (163.941 km/h)

Pole position
Driver	Kevin Harvick	Stewart-Haas Racing
- Grid positions set by competition-based formula

Most laps led
Driver	Brad Keselowski	Team Penske
- Laps: 192

Winner
No. 2	Brad Keselowski	Team Penske

Television in the United States
- Network: NBCSN
- Announcers: Rick Allen, Jeff Burton, Steve Letarte and Dale Earnhardt Jr.
- Nielsen ratings: 1.05 (1.74 million)

Radio in the United States
- Radio: MRN
- Booth announcers: Alex Hayden, Jeff Striegle and Rusty Wallace
- Turn announcers: Dave Moody (Backstretch)

The 2020 Federated Auto Parts 400 was a NASCAR Cup Series race held on September 12, 2020, at Richmond Raceway in Richmond, Virginia. Contested over 400 laps on the .75-mile (1.21 km) D-shaped short track, it was the 28th race of the 2020 NASCAR Cup Series season, second race of the Playoffs and second race of the Round of 16.

== Report ==
=== Background ===
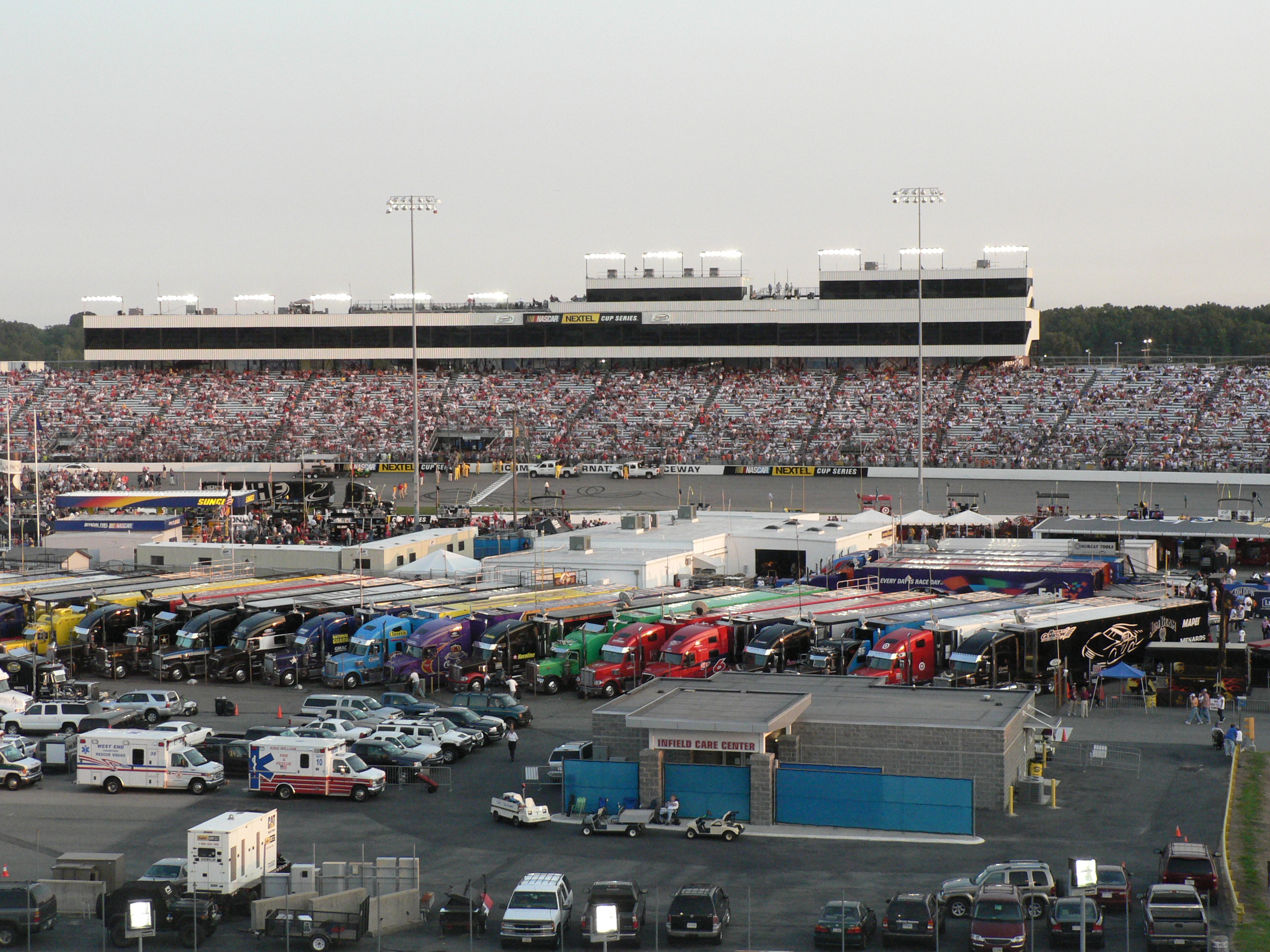
Richmond Raceway, the track where the race was held.

Richmond Raceway (RR), formerly known as Richmond International Raceway (RIR), is a 3/4-mile (1.2 km), D-shaped, asphalt race track located just outside Richmond, Virginia in Henrico County. It hosts the NASCAR Cup Series, the NASCAR Xfinity Series, NASCAR Gander RV & Outdoors Truck Series and the IndyCar series. Known as "America's premier short track", it formerly hosted two USAC sprint car races.

==== Entry list ====
- (R) denotes rookie driver.
- (i) denotes driver who are ineligible for series driver points.

No.	Driver	Team	Manufacturer
00	Quin Houff (R)	StarCom Racing	Chevrolet
1	Kurt Busch	Chip Ganassi Racing	Chevrolet
2	Brad Keselowski	Team Penske	Ford
3	Austin Dillon	Richard Childress Racing	Chevrolet
4	Kevin Harvick	Stewart-Haas Racing	Ford
6	Ryan Newman	Roush Fenway Racing	Ford
8	Tyler Reddick (R)	Richard Childress Racing	Chevrolet
9	Chase Elliott	Hendrick Motorsports	Chevrolet
10	Aric Almirola	Stewart-Haas Racing	Ford
11	Denny Hamlin	Joe Gibbs Racing	Toyota
12	Ryan Blaney	Team Penske	Ford
13	Ty Dillon	Germain Racing	Chevrolet
14	Clint Bowyer	Stewart-Haas Racing	Ford
15	Brennan Poole (R)	Premium Motorsports	Chevrolet
17	Chris Buescher	Roush Fenway Racing	Ford
18	Kyle Busch	Joe Gibbs Racing	Toyota
19	Martin Truex Jr.	Joe Gibbs Racing	Toyota
20	Erik Jones	Joe Gibbs Racing	Toyota
21	Matt DiBenedetto	Wood Brothers Racing	Ford
22	Joey Logano	Team Penske	Ford
24	William Byron	Hendrick Motorsports	Chevrolet
27	J. J. Yeley (i)	Rick Ware Racing	Ford
32	Corey LaJoie	Go Fas Racing	Ford
34	Michael McDowell	Front Row Motorsports	Ford
37	Ryan Preece	JTG Daugherty Racing	Chevrolet
38	John Hunter Nemechek (R)	Front Row Motorsports	Ford
41	Cole Custer (R)	Stewart-Haas Racing	Ford
42	Matt Kenseth	Chip Ganassi Racing	Chevrolet
43	Bubba Wallace	Richard Petty Motorsports	Chevrolet
47	Ricky Stenhouse Jr.	JTG Daugherty Racing	Chevrolet
48	Jimmie Johnson	Hendrick Motorsports	Chevrolet
51	Joey Gase (i)	Petty Ware Racing	Ford
53	James Davison	Rick Ware Racing	Chevrolet
66	Timmy Hill (i)	MBM Motorsports	Toyota
77	Reed Sorenson	Spire Motorsports	Chevrolet
88	Alex Bowman	Hendrick Motorsports	Chevrolet
95	Christopher Bell (R)	Leavine Family Racing	Toyota
96	Daniel Suárez	Gaunt Brothers Racing	Toyota
Official entry list

== Qualifying ==
Kevin Harvick was awarded the pole for the race as determined by competition-based formula.

=== Starting Lineup ===
Pos	No.	Driver	Team	Manufacturer
1	4	Kevin Harvick	Stewart-Haas Racing	Ford
2	22	Joey Logano	Team Penske	Ford
3	3	Austin Dillon	Richard Childress Racing	Chevrolet
4	88	Alex Bowman	Hendrick Motorsports	Chevrolet
5	24	William Byron	Hendrick Motorsports	Chevrolet
6	18	Kyle Busch	Joe Gibbs Racing	Toyota
7	11	Denny Hamlin	Joe Gibbs Racing	Toyota
8	1	Kurt Busch	Chip Ganassi Racing	Chevrolet
9	2	Brad Keselowski	Team Penske	Ford
10	10	Aric Almirola	Stewart-Haas Racing	Ford
11	14	Clint Bowyer	Stewart-Haas Racing	Ford
12	9	Chase Elliott	Hendrick Motorsports	Chevrolet
13	41	Cole Custer (R)	Stewart-Haas Racing	Ford
14	19	Martin Truex Jr.	Joe Gibbs Racing	Toyota
15	12	Ryan Blaney	Team Penske	Ford
16	21	Matt DiBenedetto	Wood Brothers Racing	Ford
17	20	Erik Jones	Joe Gibbs Racing	Toyota
18	48	Jimmie Johnson	Hendrick Motorsports	Chevrolet
19	42	Matt Kenseth	Chip Ganassi Racing	Chevrolet
20	34	Michael McDowell	Front Row Motorsports	Ford
21	6	Ryan Newman	Roush Fenway Racing	Ford
22	8	Tyler Reddick (R)	Richard Childress Racing	Chevrolet
23	47	Ricky Stenhouse Jr.	JTG Daugherty Racing	Chevrolet
24	37	Ryan Preece	JTG Daugherty Racing	Chevrolet
25	17	Chris Buescher	Roush Fenway Racing	Ford
26	95	Christopher Bell (R)	Leavine Family Racing	Toyota
27	13	Ty Dillon	Germain Racing	Chevrolet
28	96	Daniel Suárez	Gaunt Brothers Racing	Toyota
29	15	Brennan Poole (R)	Premium Motorsports	Chevrolet
30	43	Bubba Wallace	Richard Petty Motorsports	Chevrolet
31	38	John Hunter Nemechek (R)	Front Row Motorsports	Ford
32	27	J. J. Yeley (i)	Rick Ware Racing	Ford
33	00	Quin Houff (R)	StarCom Racing	Chevrolet
34	32	Corey LaJoie	Go Fas Racing	Ford
35	77	Reed Sorenson	Spire Motorsports	Chevrolet
36	51	Joey Gase (i)	Petty Ware Racing	Ford
37	66	Timmy Hill (i)	MBM Motorsports	Toyota
38	53	James Davison	Rick Ware Racing	Chevrolet
Official starting lineup

== Race ==
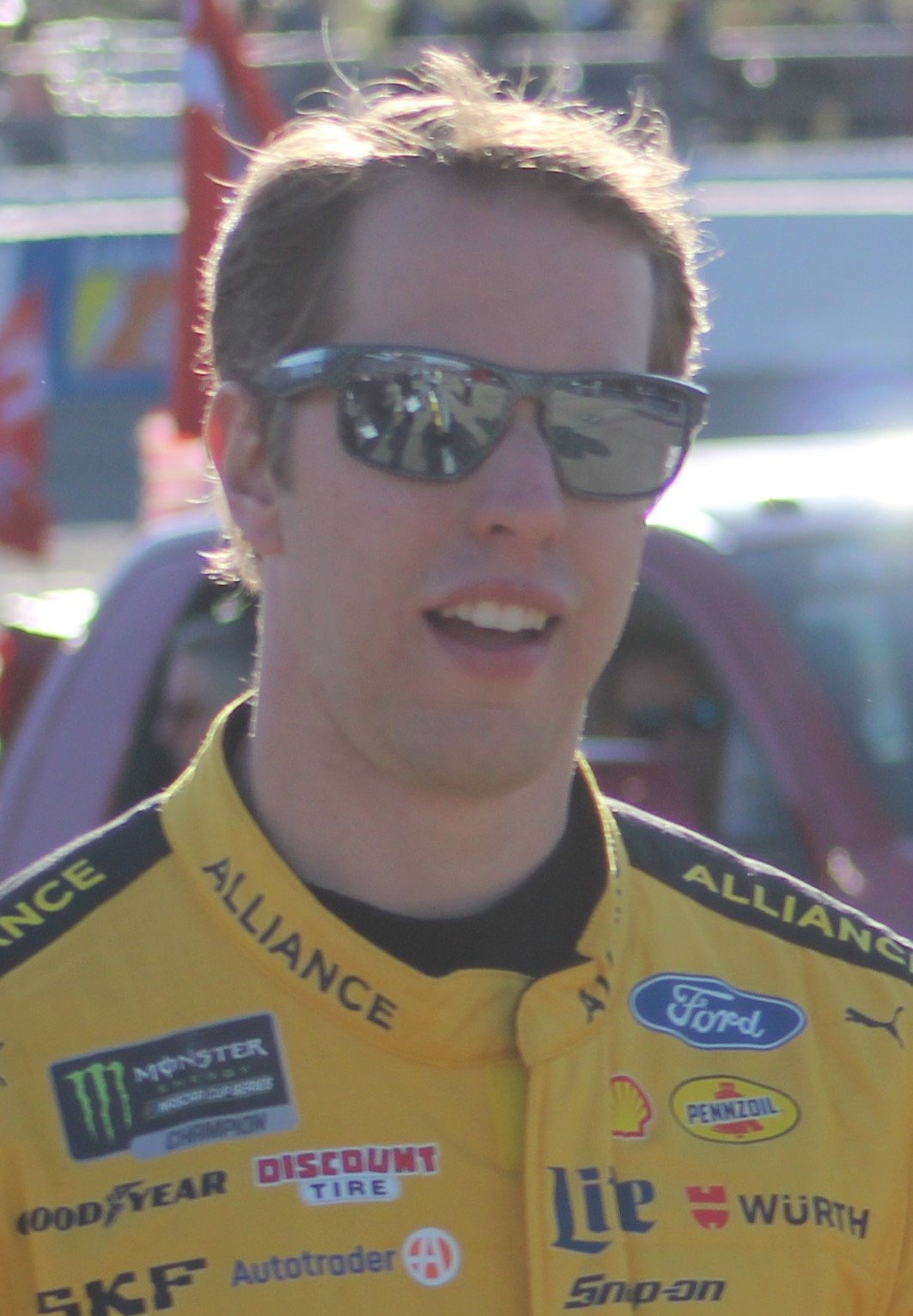
Brad Keselowski won the race.

=== Stage Results ===
Stage One Laps: 80

Pos	No	Driver	Team	Manufacturer	Points
1	11	Denny Hamlin	Joe Gibbs Racing	Toyota	10
2	3	Austin Dillon	Richard Childress Racing	Chevrolet	9
3	22	Joey Logano	Team Penske	Ford	8
4	2	Brad Keselowski	Team Penske	Ford	7
5	4	Kevin Harvick	Stewart-Haas Racing	Ford	6
6	88	Alex Bowman	Hendrick Motorsports	Chevrolet	5
7	19	Martin Truex Jr.	Joe Gibbs Racing	Toyota	4
8	9	Chase Elliott	Hendrick Motorsports	Chevrolet	3
9	47	Ricky Stenhouse Jr.	JTG Daugherty Racing	Chevrolet	2
10	14	Clint Bowyer	Stewart-Haas Racing	Ford	1
Official stage one results

Stage Two Laps: 155

Pos	No	Driver	Team	Manufacturer	Points
1	2	Brad Keselowski	Team Penske	Ford	10
2	3	Austin Dillon	Richard Childress Racing	Chevrolet	9
3	19	Martin Truex Jr.	Joe Gibbs Racing	Toyota	8
4	22	Joey Logano	Team Penske	Ford	7
5	9	Chase Elliott	Hendrick Motorsports	Chevrolet	6
6	18	Kyle Busch	Joe Gibbs Racing	Toyota	5
7	1	Kurt Busch	Chip Ganassi Racing	Chevrolet	4
8	10	Aric Almirola	Stewart-Haas Racing	Ford	3
9	42	Matt Kenseth	Chip Ganassi Racing	Chevrolet	2
10	4	Kevin Harvick	Stewart-Haas Racing	Ford	1
Official stage two results

=== Final Stage Results ===
Stage Three Laps: 165

Pos	Grid	No	Driver	Team	Manufacturer	Laps	Points
1	9	2	Brad Keselowski	Team Penske	Ford	400	57
2	14	19	Martin Truex Jr.	Joe Gibbs Racing	Toyota	400	47
3	2	22	Joey Logano	Team Penske	Ford	400	49
4	3	3	Austin Dillon	Richard Childress Racing	Chevrolet	400	51
5	12	9	Chase Elliott	Hendrick Motorsports	Chevrolet	400	41
6	6	18	Kyle Busch	Joe Gibbs Racing	Toyota	400	36
7	1	4	Kevin Harvick	Stewart-Haas Racing	Ford	400	37
8	10	10	Aric Almirola	Stewart-Haas Racing	Ford	400	32
9	4	88	Alex Bowman	Hendrick Motorsports	Chevrolet	400	33
10	11	14	Clint Bowyer	Stewart-Haas Racing	Ford	400	28
11	22	8	Tyler Reddick (R)	Richard Childress Racing	Chevrolet	400	26
12	7	11	Denny Hamlin	Joe Gibbs Racing	Toyota	399	35
13	8	1	Kurt Busch	Chip Ganassi Racing	Chevrolet	399	28
14	13	41	Cole Custer (R)	Stewart-Haas Racing	Ford	399	23
15	26	95	Christopher Bell (R)	Leavine Family Racing	Toyota	399	22
16	19	42	Matt Kenseth	Chip Ganassi Racing	Chevrolet	399	23
17	16	21	Matt DiBenedetto	Wood Brothers Racing	Ford	399	20
18	23	47	Ricky Stenhouse Jr.	JTG Daugherty Racing	Chevrolet	398	21
19	15	12	Ryan Blaney	Team Penske	Ford	398	18
20	24	37	Ryan Preece	JTG Daugherty Racing	Chevrolet	398	17
21	5	24	William Byron	Hendrick Motorsports	Chevrolet	398	16
22	17	20	Erik Jones	Joe Gibbs Racing	Toyota	398	15
23	21	6	Ryan Newman	Roush Fenway Racing	Ford	397	14
24	25	17	Chris Buescher	Roush Fenway Racing	Ford	397	13
25	20	34	Michael McDowell	Front Row Motorsports	Ford	397	12
26	30	43	Bubba Wallace	Richard Petty Motorsports	Chevrolet	397	11
27	34	32	Corey LaJoie	Go Fas Racing	Ford	396	10
28	27	13	Ty Dillon	Germain Racing	Chevrolet	396	9
29	28	96	Daniel Suárez	Gaunt Brothers Racing	Toyota	396	8
30	31	38	John Hunter Nemechek (R)	Front Row Motorsports	Ford	396	7
31	18	48	Jimmie Johnson	Hendrick Motorsports	Chevrolet	395	6
32	33	00	Quin Houff (R)	StarCom Racing	Chevrolet	390	5
33	29	15	Brennan Poole (R)	Premium Motorsports	Chevrolet	390	4
34	32	27	J. J. Yeley (i)	Rick Ware Racing	Ford	388	0
35	36	51	Joey Gase (i)	Petty Ware Racing	Ford	387	0
36	35	77	Reed Sorenson	Spire Motorsports	Chevrolet	387	1
37	38	53	James Davison	Rick Ware Racing	Chevrolet	385	1
38	37	66	Timmy Hill (i)	MBM Motorsports	Toyota	100	0
Official race results

=== Race statistics ===
- Lead changes: 19 among 9 different drivers
- Cautions/Laps: 3 for 21
- Red flags: 0
- Time of race: 2 hours, 56 minutes and 42 seconds
- Average speed: 101.868 miles per hour (163.941 km/h)

== Media ==
=== Television ===
NBC Sports covered the race on the television side. Rick Allen, Jeff Burton, Steve Letarte and three-time Richmond winner Dale Earnhardt Jr. covered the race from the booth at Charlotte Motor Speedway. Dave Burns, Parker Kligerman and Marty Snider handled the pit road duties on site.

NBCSN
Booth announcers	Pit reporters
Lap-by-lap: Rick Allen; Color-commentator: Jeff Burton; Color-commentator: Steve Letarte; Color-commentator: Dale Earnhardt Jr.	Dave Burns; Parker Kligerman; Marty Snider

=== Radio ===
The Motor Racing Network had the radio call for the race, which was also simulcast on Sirius XM NASCAR Radio. Alex Hayden, Jeff Striegle and Rusty Wallace had the call in the broadcast booth for MRN when the field races through the front straightaway. Dave Moody called the race from a platform when the field races down the backstraightaway. Jason Toy and Kim Coon called the action for MRN from pit lane.

MRN Radio
Booth announcers	Turn announcers	Pit reporters
Lead announcer: Alex Hayden; Announcer: Jeff Striegle; Announcer: Rusty Wallace	Backstretch: Dave Moody	Jason Toy; Kim Coon

== Standings after the race ==
Drivers' Championship standings

	Pos	Driver	Points
	1	Kevin Harvick	2,143
	2	Denny Hamlin	2,122 (–21)
1	3	Brad Keselowski	2,112 (–31)
1	4	Joey Logano	2,109 (–34)
1	5	Martin Truex Jr.	2,096 (–47)
2	6	Austin Dillon	2,094 (–49)
	7	Chase Elliott	2,086 (–57)
3	8	Alex Bowman	2,085 (–58)
1	9	Kyle Busch	2,076 (–67)
2	10	Aric Almirola	2,065 (–78)
	11	Kurt Busch	2,065 (–78)
1	12	Clint Bowyer	2,061 (–82)
4	13	William Byron	2,058 (–85)
	14	Cole Custer	2,053 (–90)
	15	Matt DiBenedetto	2,036 (–107)
	16	Ryan Blaney	2,034 (–109)
Official driver's standings

Manufacturers' Championship standings

Pos	Manufacturer	Points
1	Ford	1,044
2	Toyota	982 (–62)
3	Chevrolet	939 (–105)

- Note: Only the first 16 positions are included for the driver standings.

Previous race: 2020 Cook Out Southern 500	NASCAR Cup Series; 2020 season	Next race: 2020 Bass Pro Shops NRA Night Race
