= 2020 Bank of America Roval 400 =

NASCAR Cup Series race

Race details
- Race 32 of 36 in the 2020 NASCAR Cup Series
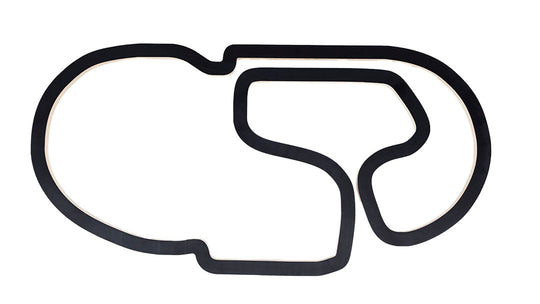
- Roval (2018–2023)
- Date: October 11, 2020
- Location: Charlotte Motor Speedway in Concord, North Carolina
- Course: Permanent racing facility
- Course length: 2.280 miles (3.669 km)
- Distance: 109 laps, 248.52 mi (400 km)
- Average speed: 76.948 miles per hour (123.836 km/h)

Pole position
Driver	Denny Hamlin	Joe Gibbs Racing
- Grid positions set by competition-based formula

Most laps led
Driver	William Byron; Chase Elliott	Hendrick Motorsports; Hendrick Motorsports
- Laps: 27

Winner
No. 9	Chase Elliott	Hendrick Motorsports

Television in the United States
- Network: NBC
- Announcers: Rick Allen, Jeff Burton, Steve Letarte and Dale Earnhardt Jr.
- Nielsen ratings: 1.7 (2.78 miilion)

Radio in the United States
- Radio: PRN
- Booth announcers: Doug Rice and Mark Garrow
- Turn announcers: Nick Yeoman (1, 2 & 3), Mike Jaynes (4, 5 & 6), Doug Turnbull (7, 8 & 9), Pat Patterson (10, 11 & 12) and Rob Albright (13, 14 & 15)

The 2020 Bank of America Roval 400 is a NASCAR Cup Series race that was held on October 11, 2020 at Charlotte Motor Speedway in Concord, North Carolina. Contested over 109 laps on the 2.28-mile (3.67 km) road course, it was the 32nd race of the 2020 NASCAR Cup Series season, the sixth race of the playoffs, and final race of the round of 12. It was also the first points race in cup series history to be declared a wet race.

== Report ==
=== Background ===
An aerial view of Charlotte Motor Speedway

Since 2018, deviating from past NASCAR events at Charlotte, the race will utilize a road course configuration of Charlotte Motor Speedway, promoted and trademarked as the "Roval". The course is 2.28 miles (3.67 km) in length and features 17 turns, utilizing the infield road course and portions of the oval track. The race will be contested over a scheduled distance of 109 laps, 400 kilometres (250 mi).

During July 2018 tests on the road course, concerns were raised over drivers exceeding track limits on the backstretch chicane on the course. The chicanes were modified with additional tire barriers and rumble strips in order to encourage drivers to properly drive through them, and NASCAR will enforce drive-through penalties on drivers who illegally "short-cut" parts of the course. The chicanes will not be used during restarts. In the summer of 2019, the bus stop on the backstretch was changed and deepened, becoming a permanent part of the circuit, compared to the previous year where it was improvised.

If a driver fails to legally make the backstretch bus stop, the driver must skip the frontstretch chicane and make a complete stop by the dotted line on the exit before being allowed to continue. A driver who misses the frontstretch chicane must stop before the exit.

==== Entry list ====
- (R) denotes rookie driver.
- (i) denotes driver who are ineligible for series driver points.

No.	Driver	Team	Manufacturer
00	Quin Houff (R)	StarCom Racing	Chevrolet
1	Kurt Busch	Chip Ganassi Racing	Chevrolet
2	Brad Keselowski	Team Penske	Ford
3	Austin Dillon	Richard Childress Racing	Chevrolet
4	Kevin Harvick	Stewart-Haas Racing	Ford
6	Ryan Newman	Roush Fenway Racing	Ford
8	Tyler Reddick (R)	Richard Childress Racing	Chevrolet
9	Chase Elliott	Hendrick Motorsports	Chevrolet
10	Aric Almirola	Stewart-Haas Racing	Ford
11	Denny Hamlin	Joe Gibbs Racing	Toyota
12	Ryan Blaney	Team Penske	Ford
13	Ty Dillon	Germain Racing	Chevrolet
14	Clint Bowyer	Stewart-Haas Racing	Ford
15	Brennan Poole (R)	Premium Motorsports	Chevrolet
17	Chris Buescher	Roush Fenway Racing	Ford
18	Kyle Busch	Joe Gibbs Racing	Toyota
19	Martin Truex Jr.	Joe Gibbs Racing	Toyota
20	Erik Jones	Joe Gibbs Racing	Toyota
21	Matt DiBenedetto	Wood Brothers Racing	Ford
22	Joey Logano	Team Penske	Ford
24	William Byron	Hendrick Motorsports	Chevrolet
27	Gray Gaulding (i)	Rick Ware Racing	Ford
32	Corey LaJoie	Go Fas Racing	Ford
34	Michael McDowell	Front Row Motorsports	Ford
37	Ryan Preece	JTG Daugherty Racing	Chevrolet
38	John Hunter Nemechek (R)	Front Row Motorsports	Ford
41	Cole Custer (R)	Stewart-Haas Racing	Ford
42	Matt Kenseth	Chip Ganassi Racing	Chevrolet
43	Bubba Wallace	Richard Petty Motorsports	Chevrolet
47	Ricky Stenhouse Jr.	JTG Daugherty Racing	Chevrolet
48	Jimmie Johnson	Hendrick Motorsports	Chevrolet
51	Josh Bilicki (i)	Petty Ware Racing	Ford
53	James Davison	Rick Ware Racing	Chevrolet
66	Timmy Hill (i)	MBM Motorsports	Toyota
77	J. J. Yeley (i)	Spire Motorsports	Chevrolet
88	Alex Bowman	Hendrick Motorsports	Chevrolet
95	Christopher Bell (R)	Leavine Family Racing	Toyota
96	Daniel Suárez	Gaunt Brothers Racing	Toyota
Official entry list

== Qualifying ==
Denny Hamlin was awarded the pole for the race as determined by competition-based formula.

=== Starting lineup ===
Pos	No.	Driver	Team	Manufacturer
1	11	Denny Hamlin	Joe Gibbs Racing	Toyota
2	9	Chase Elliott	Hendrick Motorsports	Chevrolet
3	2	Brad Keselowski	Team Penske	Ford
4	4	Kevin Harvick	Stewart-Haas Racing	Ford
5	88	Alex Bowman	Hendrick Motorsports	Chevrolet
6	3	Austin Dillon	Richard Childress Racing	Chevrolet
7	19	Martin Truex Jr.	Joe Gibbs Racing	Toyota
8	22	Joey Logano	Team Penske	Ford
9	18	Kyle Busch	Joe Gibbs Racing	Toyota
10	1	Kurt Busch	Chip Ganassi Racing	Chevrolet
11	14	Clint Bowyer	Stewart-Haas Racing	Ford
12	10	Aric Almirola	Stewart-Haas Racing	Ford
13	24	William Byron	Hendrick Motorsports	Chevrolet
14	20	Erik Jones	Joe Gibbs Racing	Toyota
15	6	Ryan Newman	Roush Fenway Racing	Ford
16	8	Tyler Reddick (R)	Richard Childress Racing	Chevrolet
17	13	Ty Dillon	Germain Racing	Chevrolet
18	37	Ryan Preece	JTG Daugherty Racing	Chevrolet
19	38	John Hunter Nemechek (R)	Front Row Motorsports	Ford
20	21	Matt DiBenedetto	Wood Brothers Racing	Ford
21	17	Chris Buescher	Roush Fenway Racing	Ford
22	15	Brennan Poole (R)	Premium Motorsports	Chevrolet
23	42	Matt Kenseth	Chip Ganassi Racing	Chevrolet
24	12	Ryan Blaney	Team Penske	Ford
25	00	Quin Houff (R)	StarCom Racing	Chevrolet
26	43	Bubba Wallace	Richard Petty Motorsports	Chevrolet
27	66	Timmy Hill (i)	MBM Motorsports	Toyota
28	41	Cole Custer (R)	Stewart-Haas Racing	Ford
29	51	Josh Bilicki (i)	Petty Ware Racing	Ford
30	48	Jimmie Johnson	Hendrick Motorsports	Chevrolet
31	34	Michael McDowell	Front Row Motorsports	Ford
32	32	Corey LaJoie	Go Fas Racing	Ford
33	77	J. J. Yeley (i)	Spire Motorsports	Chevrolet
34	96	Daniel Suárez	Gaunt Brothers Racing	Toyota
35	95	Christopher Bell (R)	Leavine Family Racing	Toyota
36	27	Gray Gaulding (i)	Rick Ware Racing	Ford
37	53	James Davison	Rick Ware Racing	Chevrolet
38	47	Ricky Stenhouse Jr.	JTG Daugherty Racing	Chevrolet
Official starting lineup

== Race ==
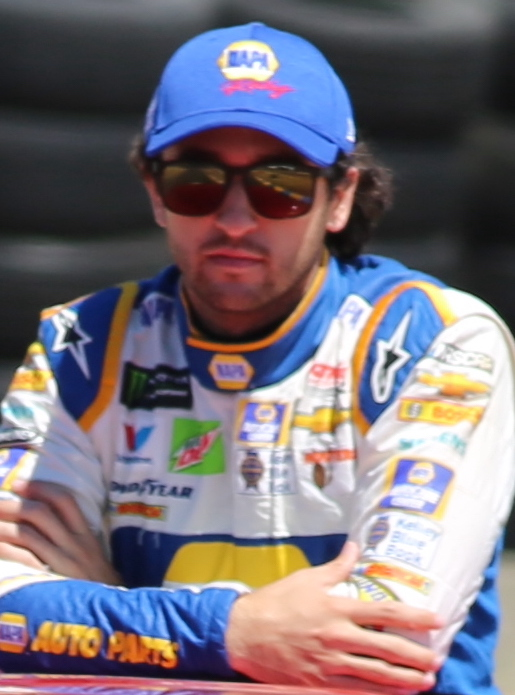
Chase Elliott won the race.

=== Stage results ===
Stage one Laps: 25

Pos	No	Driver	Team	Manufacturer	Points
1	13	Ty Dillon	Germain Racing	Chevrolet	10
2	95	Christopher Bell (R)	Leavine Family Racing	Toyota	9
3	21	Matt DiBenedetto	Wood Brothers Racing	Ford	8
4	24	William Byron	Hendrick Motorsports	Chevrolet	7
5	66	Timmy Hill (i)	MBM Motorsports	Toyota	0
6	6	Ryan Newman	Roush Fenway Racing	Ford	5
7	12	Ryan Blaney	Team Penske	Ford	4
8	22	Joey Logano	Team Penske	Ford	3
9	43	Bubba Wallace	Richard Petty Motorsports	Chevrolet	2
10	20	Erik Jones	Joe Gibbs Racing	Toyota	1
Official stage one results

Stage two Laps: 25

Pos	No	Driver	Team	Manufacturer	Points
1	12	Ryan Blaney	Team Penske	Ford	10
2	9	Chase Elliott	Hendrick Motorsports	Chevrolet	9
3	95	Christopher Bell (R)	Leavine Family Racing	Toyota	8
4	19	Martin Truex Jr.	Joe Gibbs Racing	Toyota	7
5	22	Joey Logano	Team Penske	Ford	6
6	88	Alex Bowman	Hendrick Motorsports	Chevrolet	5
7	24	William Byron	Hendrick Motorsports	Chevrolet	4
8	8	Tyler Reddick (R)	Richard Childress Racing	Chevrolet	3
9	34	Michael McDowell	Front Row Motorsports	Ford	2
10	2	Brad Keselowski	Team Penske	Ford	1
Official stage two results

=== Final stage results ===
Stage three Laps: 59

Pos	Grid	No	Driver	Team	Manufacturer	Laps	Points
1	2	9	Chase Elliott	Hendrick Motorsports	Chevrolet	109	49
2	8	22	Joey Logano	Team Penske	Ford	109	44
3	14	20	Erik Jones	Joe Gibbs Racing	Toyota	109	35
4	10	1	Kurt Busch	Chip Ganassi Racing	Chevrolet	109	33
5	24	12	Ryan Blaney	Team Penske	Ford	109	46
6	13	24	William Byron	Hendrick Motorsports	Chevrolet	109	42
7	7	19	Martin Truex Jr.	Joe Gibbs Racing	Toyota	109	37
8	5	88	Alex Bowman	Hendrick Motorsports	Chevrolet	109	34
9	28	41	Cole Custer (R)	Stewart-Haas Racing	Ford	109	28
10	11	14	Clint Bowyer	Stewart-Haas Racing	Ford	109	27
11	4	4	Kevin Harvick	Stewart-Haas Racing	Ford	109	26
12	16	8	Tyler Reddick (R)	Richard Childress Racing	Chevrolet	109	28
13	30	48	Jimmie Johnson	Hendrick Motorsports	Chevrolet	109	24
14	18	37	Ryan Preece	JTG Daugherty Racing	Chevrolet	109	23
15	1	11	Denny Hamlin	Joe Gibbs Racing	Toyota	109	22
16	12	10	Aric Almirola	Stewart-Haas Racing	Ford	109	21
17	38	47	Ricky Stenhouse Jr.	JTG Daugherty Racing	Chevrolet	109	20
18	3	2	Brad Keselowski	Team Penske	Ford	109	20
19	6	3	Austin Dillon	Richard Childress Racing	Chevrolet	109	18
20	21	17	Chris Buescher	Roush Fenway Racing	Ford	109	17
21	26	43	Bubba Wallace	Richard Petty Motorsports	Chevrolet	109	18
22	20	21	Matt DiBenedetto	Wood Brothers Racing	Ford	109	23
23	17	13	Ty Dillon	Germain Racing	Chevrolet	109	24
24	35	95	Christopher Bell (R)	Leavine Family Racing	Toyota	109	30
25	34	96	Daniel Suárez	Gaunt Brothers Racing	Toyota	109	12
26	36	27	Gray Gaulding (i)	Rick Ware Racing	Ford	109	0
27	32	32	Corey LaJoie	Go Fas Racing	Ford	109	10
28	25	00	Quin Houff (R)	StarCom Racing	Chevrolet	109	9
29	37	53	James Davison	Rick Ware Racing	Chevrolet	109	8
30	9	18	Kyle Busch	Joe Gibbs Racing	Toyota	109	7
31	15	6	Ryan Newman	Roush Fenway Racing	Ford	109	11
32	31	34	Michael McDowell	Front Row Motorsports	Ford	109	7
33	29	51	Josh Bilicki (i)	Petty Ware Racing	Ford	108	0
34	23	42	Matt Kenseth	Chip Ganassi Racing	Chevrolet	108	3
35	33	77	J. J. Yeley (i)	Spire Motorsports	Chevrolet	108	0
36	19	38	John Hunter Nemechek (R)	Front Row Motorsports	Ford	105	1
37	22	15	Brennan Poole (R)	Premium Motorsports	Chevrolet	95	1
38	27	66	Timmy Hill (i)	MBM Motorsports	Toyota	57	0
Official race results

=== Race statistics ===
- Lead changes: 17 among 11 different drivers
- Cautions/Laps: 9 for 16
- Red flags: 0
- Time of race: 3 hours, 17 minutes and 11 seconds
- Average speed: 76.948 miles per hour (123.836 km/h)

== Media ==
=== Television ===
NBC Sports covered the race on the television side. Rick Allen, Jeff Burton, Steve Letarte and Dale Earnhardt Jr. called the action from the booth live from the track for the first time since March. Dave Burns, Parker Kligerman and Dillon Welch handled the pit road duties and Rutledge Wood handled the features live from the track.

NBC
Booth announcers	Pit reporters	Features reporter
Lap-by-lap: Rick Allen; Color-commentator: Jeff Burton; Color-commentator: Steve Letarte; Color-commentator: Dale Earnhardt Jr.	Dave Burns; Parker Kligerman; Dillon Welch	Rutledge Wood

=== Radio ===
The Performance Racing Network had the radio call for the race, which was also simulcast on Sirius XM NASCAR Radio. Doug Rice and Mark Garrow called the race from the booth when the field raced down the front straightaway. IMS Radio's Nick Yeoman was assigned the entrance to the road course and into the Bank of America bridge (Turns 1-3). Voice of the Indianapolis 500 Mark Jaynes was assigned the action from the Bank of America bridge to the middle of the infield section. Doug Turnbull called the action exiting in infield into the oval Turn 1 banking (Turns 7-9). Pat Patterson called the action on the backstretch and into the bus stop. Rob Albright was assigned to the oval Turn 3-4 end. (Turns 13-15). Brad Gillie, Brett McMillan and Wendy Venturini had the call from the pit area for PRN.

PRN
Booth announcers	Turn announcers	Pit reporters
Lead announcer: Doug Rice; Announcer: Mark Garrow	Infield entrance: Nick Yeoman; Middle of Infield: Mark Jaynes; Exit of Infield: Doug Turnbull; Oval 2 to Bus Stop Pat Patterson; Oval 3/4: Rob Albright	Brad Gillie; Brett McMillan; Wendy Venturini

== Standings after the race ==
Drivers' Championship standings

	Pos	Driver	Points
1	1	Kevin Harvick	4,067
1	2	Denny Hamlin	4,054 (–13)
1	3	Brad Keselowski	4,035 (–32)
1	4	Chase Elliott	4,027 (–40)
2	5	Joey Logano	4,022 (–45)
1	6	Martin Truex Jr.	4,017 (–50)
1	7	Alex Bowman	4,009 (–58)
2	8	Kurt Busch	4,006 (–61)
1	9	Kyle Busch	2,187 (–1,880)
1	10	Austin Dillon	2,186 (–1,881)
2	11	Ryan Blaney	2,160 (–1,907)
2	12	William Byron	2,155 (–1,912)
2	13	Clint Bowyer	2,154 (–1,913)
2	14	Aric Almirola	2,143 (–1,924)
	15	Matt DiBenedetto	2,131 (–1,936)
	16	Cole Custer	2,123 (–1,944)
Official driver's standings

Manufacturers' Championship standings

Pos	Manufacturer	Points
1	Ford	1,186
2	Toyota	1,125 (–61)
3	Chevrolet	1,086 (–100)

- Note: Only the first 16 positions are included for the driver standings.

Previous race: 2020 YellaWood 500	NASCAR Cup Series; 2020 season	Next race: 2020 Hollywood Casino 400
