= 2020 Autotrader EchoPark Automotive 500 =

NASCAR Cup Series race

Race details
- Race 34 of 36 in the 2020 NASCAR Cup Series
- 2020 AutoTrader EchoPark Automotive 500 program cover
- Date: October 25 & 28, 2020
- Location: Texas Motor Speedway in Fort Worth, Texas
- Course: Permanent racing facility
- Course length: 1.5 miles (2.4 km)
- Distance: 334 laps, 501 mi (801.6 km)
- Average speed: 135.263 miles per hour (217.685 km/h)

Pole position
| Driver | Kevin Harvick | Stewart-Haas Racing |
- Grid positions set by competition-based formula

Most laps led
| Driver | Kyle Busch | Joe Gibbs Racing |
- Laps: 90

Winner
| No. 18 | Kyle Busch | Joe Gibbs Racing |

Television in the United States
- Network: NBCSN
- Announcers: Rick Allen, Jeff Burton, Steve Letarte and Dale Earnhardt Jr.
- Nielsen ratings: 1.2 million

Radio in the United States
- Radio: PRN
- Booth announcers: Doug Rice and Mark Garrow
- Turn announcers: Rob Albright (1 & 2) and Pat Patterson (3 & 4)

The 2020 Autotrader EchoPark Automotive 500 was a NASCAR Cup Series race that was held on October 25, 2020 at Texas Motor Speedway in Fort Worth, Texas. Contested over 334 laps on the 1.5 mile (2.4 km) intermediate quad-oval, it was the 34th race of the 2020 NASCAR Cup Series season, the eighth race of the Playoffs, and second race of the Round of 8. Rain forced the race to be stopped after 52 laps, and the race was re-commenced on Wednesday, October 28.

== Report ==
=== Background ===
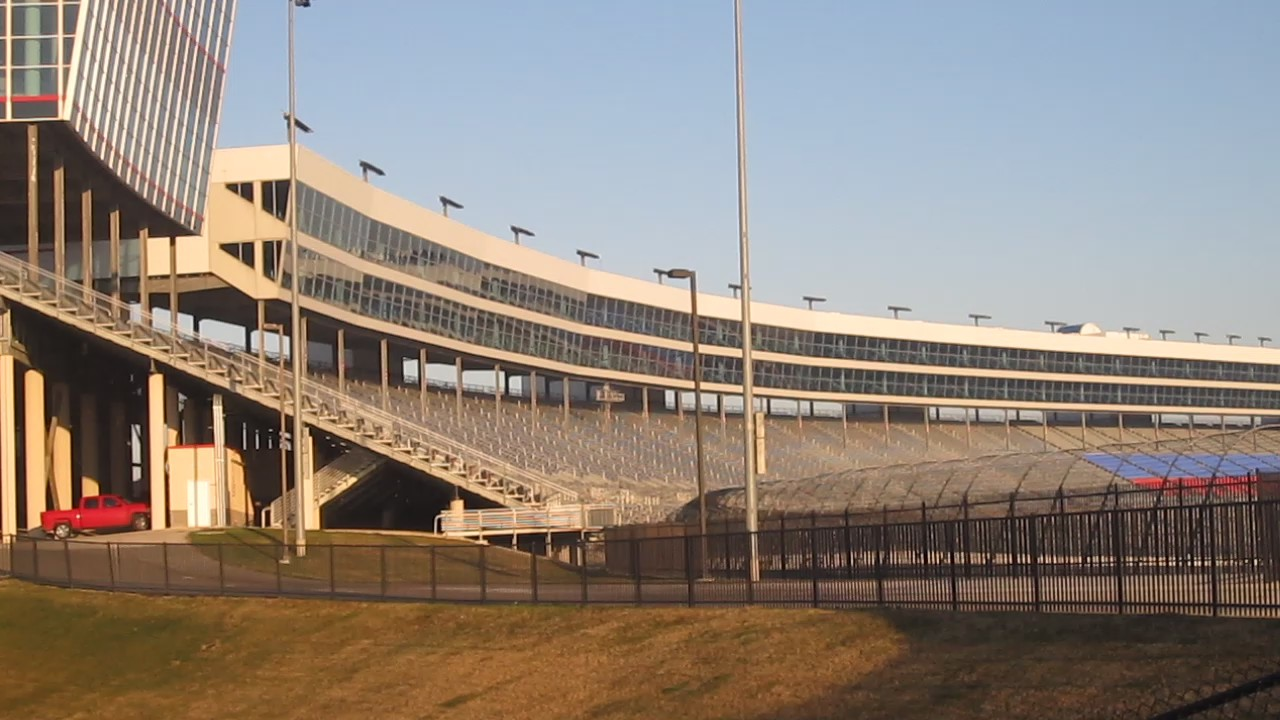
Texas Motor Speedway, the track where the race was held.

Texas Motor Speedway is a speedway located in the northernmost portion of the U.S. city of Fort Worth, Texas – the portion located in Denton County, Texas. The track measures 1.5 miles (2.4 km) around and is banked 24 degrees in the turns, and is of the oval design, where the front straightaway juts outward slightly. The track layout is similar to Atlanta Motor Speedway and Charlotte Motor Speedway (formerly Lowe's Motor Speedway). The track is owned by Speedway Motorsports, Inc., the same company that owns Atlanta and Charlotte Motor Speedway, as well as the short-track Bristol Motor Speedway.

==== Entry list ====
- (R) denotes rookie driver.
- (i) denotes driver who are ineligible for series driver points.

| No. | Driver | Team | Manufacturer |
|---|---|---|---|
| 00 | Quin Houff (R) | StarCom Racing | Chevrolet |
| 1 | Kurt Busch | Chip Ganassi Racing | Chevrolet |
| 2 | Brad Keselowski | Team Penske | Ford |
| 3 | Austin Dillon | Richard Childress Racing | Chevrolet |
| 4 | Kevin Harvick | Stewart-Haas Racing | Ford |
| 6 | Ryan Newman | Roush Fenway Racing | Ford |
| 7 | Josh Bilicki (i) | Tommy Baldwin Racing | Chevrolet |
| 8 | Tyler Reddick (R) | Richard Childress Racing | Chevrolet |
| 9 | Chase Elliott | Hendrick Motorsports | Chevrolet |
| 10 | Aric Almirola | Stewart-Haas Racing | Ford |
| 11 | Denny Hamlin | Joe Gibbs Racing | Toyota |
| 12 | Ryan Blaney | Team Penske | Ford |
| 13 | Ty Dillon | Germain Racing | Chevrolet |
| 14 | Clint Bowyer | Stewart-Haas Racing | Ford |
| 15 | Brennan Poole (R) | Premium Motorsports | Chevrolet |
| 17 | Chris Buescher | Roush Fenway Racing | Ford |
| 18 | Kyle Busch | Joe Gibbs Racing | Toyota |
| 19 | Martin Truex Jr. | Joe Gibbs Racing | Toyota |
| 20 | Erik Jones | Joe Gibbs Racing | Toyota |
| 21 | Matt DiBenedetto | Wood Brothers Racing | Ford |
| 22 | Joey Logano | Team Penske | Ford |
| 24 | William Byron | Hendrick Motorsports | Chevrolet |
| 27 | J. J. Yeley (i) | Rick Ware Racing | Chevrolet |
| 32 | Corey LaJoie | Go Fas Racing | Ford |
| 34 | Michael McDowell | Front Row Motorsports | Ford |
| 37 | Ryan Preece | JTG Daugherty Racing | Chevrolet |
| 38 | John Hunter Nemechek (R) | Front Row Motorsports | Ford |
| 41 | Cole Custer (R) | Stewart-Haas Racing | Ford |
| 42 | Matt Kenseth | Chip Ganassi Racing | Chevrolet |
| 43 | Bubba Wallace | Richard Petty Motorsports | Chevrolet |
| 47 | Ricky Stenhouse Jr. | JTG Daugherty Racing | Chevrolet |
| 48 | Jimmie Johnson | Hendrick Motorsports | Chevrolet |
| 49 | Chad Finchum (i) | MBM Motorsports | Toyota |
| 51 | Joey Gase (i) | Petty Ware Racing | Ford |
| 53 | Garrett Smithley (i) | Rick Ware Racing | Ford |
| 66 | Timmy Hill (i) | MBM Motorsports | Toyota |
| 77 | Reed Sorenson | Spire Motorsports | Chevrolet |
| 88 | Alex Bowman | Hendrick Motorsports | Chevrolet |
| 95 | Christopher Bell (R) | Leavine Family Racing | Toyota |
| 96 | Daniel Suárez | Gaunt Brothers Racing | Toyota |
Official entry list

== Qualifying ==
Kevin Harvick was awarded the pole for the race as determined by competition-based formula.

=== Starting Lineup ===
| Pos | No. | Driver | Team | Manufacturer |
|---|---|---|---|---|
| 1 | 4 | Kevin Harvick | Stewart-Haas Racing | Ford |
| 2 | 22 | Joey Logano | Team Penske | Ford |
| 3 | 2 | Brad Keselowski | Team Penske | Ford |
| 4 | 9 | Chase Elliott | Hendrick Motorsports | Chevrolet |
| 5 | 88 | Alex Bowman | Hendrick Motorsports | Chevrolet |
| 6 | 19 | Martin Truex Jr. | Joe Gibbs Racing | Toyota |
| 7 | 11 | Denny Hamlin | Joe Gibbs Racing | Toyota |
| 8 | 1 | Kurt Busch | Chip Ganassi Racing | Chevrolet |
| 9 | 18 | Kyle Busch | Joe Gibbs Racing | Toyota |
| 10 | 12 | Ryan Blaney | Team Penske | Ford |
| 11 | 24 | William Byron | Hendrick Motorsports | Chevrolet |
| 12 | 3 | Austin Dillon | Richard Childress Racing | Chevrolet |
| 13 | 10 | Aric Almirola | Stewart-Haas Racing | Ford |
| 14 | 21 | Matt DiBenedetto | Wood Brothers Racing | Ford |
| 15 | 95 | Christopher Bell (R) | Leavine Family Racing | Toyota |
| 16 | 41 | Cole Custer (R) | Stewart-Haas Racing | Ford |
| 17 | 20 | Erik Jones | Joe Gibbs Racing | Toyota |
| 18 | 43 | Bubba Wallace | Richard Petty Motorsports | Chevrolet |
| 19 | 17 | Chris Buescher | Roush Fenway Racing | Ford |
| 20 | 8 | Tyler Reddick (R) | Richard Childress Racing | Chevrolet |
| 21 | 14 | Clint Bowyer | Stewart-Haas Racing | Ford |
| 22 | 47 | Ricky Stenhouse Jr. | JTG Daugherty Racing | Chevrolet |
| 23 | 34 | Michael McDowell | Front Row Motorsports | Ford |
| 24 | 38 | John Hunter Nemechek (R) | Front Row Motorsports | Ford |
| 25 | 6 | Ryan Newman | Roush Fenway Racing | Ford |
| 26 | 48 | Jimmie Johnson | Hendrick Motorsports | Chevrolet |
| 27 | 13 | Ty Dillon | Germain Racing | Chevrolet |
| 28 | 32 | Corey LaJoie | Go Fas Racing | Ford |
| 29 | 37 | Ryan Preece | JTG Daugherty Racing | Chevrolet |
| 30 | 96 | Daniel Suárez | Gaunt Brothers Racing | Toyota |
| 31 | 15 | Brennan Poole (R) | Premium Motorsports | Chevrolet |
| 32 | 42 | Matt Kenseth | Chip Ganassi Racing | Chevrolet |
| 33 | 27 | J. J. Yeley (i) | Rick Ware Racing | Chevrolet |
| 34 | 00 | Quin Houff (R) | StarCom Racing | Chevrolet |
| 35 | 77 | Reed Sorenson | Spire Motorsports | Chevrolet |
| 36 | 66 | Timmy Hill (i) | MBM Motorsports | Toyota |
| 37 | 7 | Josh Bilicki (i) | Tommy Baldwin Racing | Chevrolet |
| 38 | 53 | Garrett Smithley (i) | Rick Ware Racing | Ford |
| 39 | 51 | Joey Gase (i) | Petty Ware Racing | Ford |
| 40 | 49 | Chad Finchum (i) | MBM Motorsports | Toyota |
Official starting lineup

== Race ==
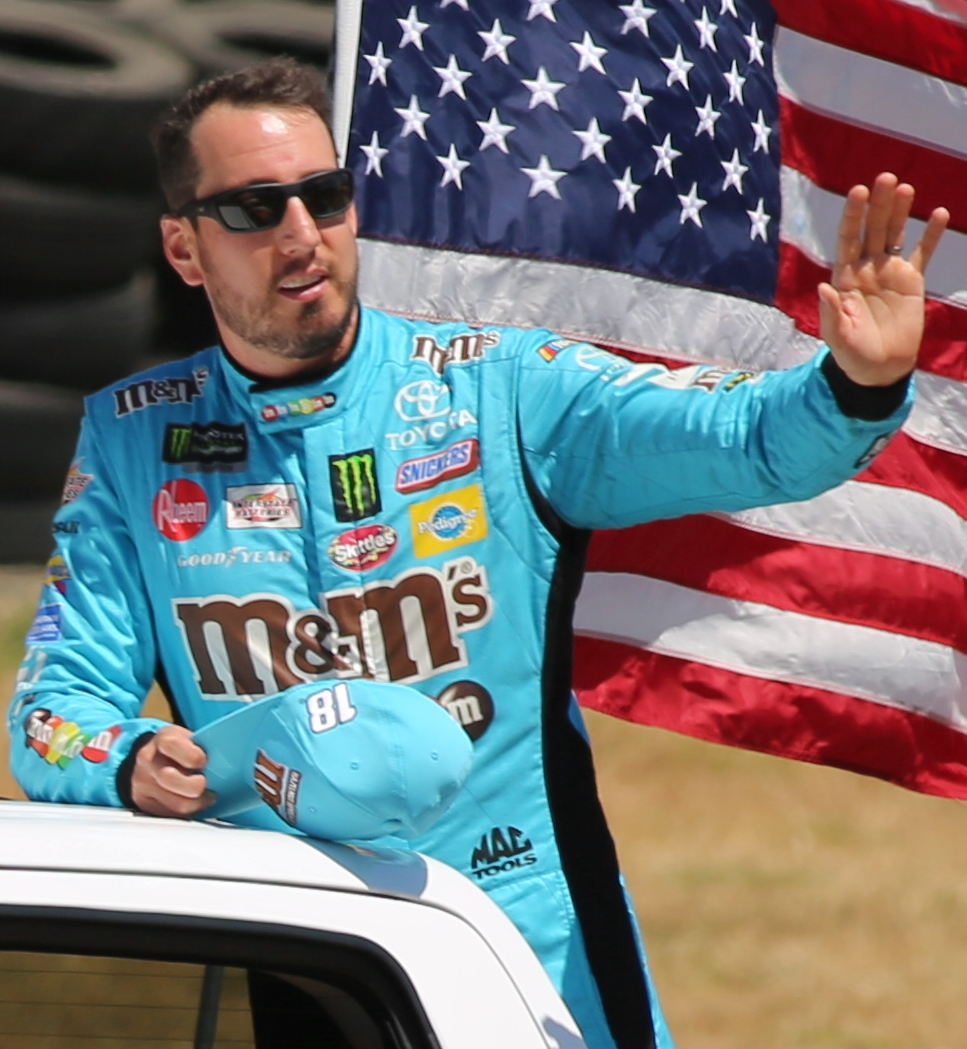
Kyle Busch won the race.

=== Stage Results ===
Stage One Laps: 105

| Pos | No | Driver | Team | Manufacturer | Points |
|---|---|---|---|---|---|
| 1 | 14 | Clint Bowyer | Stewart-Haas Racing | Ford | 10 |
| 2 | 19 | Martin Truex Jr. | Joe Gibbs Racing | Toyota | 9 |
| 3 | 20 | Erik Jones | Joe Gibbs Racing | Toyota | 8 |
| 4 | 12 | Ryan Blaney | Team Penske | Ford | 7 |
| 5 | 48 | Jimmie Johnson | Hendrick Motorsports | Chevrolet | 6 |
| 6 | 24 | William Byron | Hendrick Motorsports | Chevrolet | 5 |
| 7 | 9 | Chase Elliott | Hendrick Motorsports | Chevrolet | 4 |
| 8 | 22 | Joey Logano | Team Penske | Ford | 3 |
| 9 | 3 | Austin Dillon | Richard Childress Racing | Chevrolet | 2 |
| 10 | 21 | Matt DiBenedetto | Wood Brothers Racing | Ford | 1 |
Official stage one results

Stage Two Laps: 105

| Pos | No | Driver | Team | Manufacturer | Points |
|---|---|---|---|---|---|
| 1 | 18 | Kyle Busch | Joe Gibbs Racing | Toyota | 10 |
| 2 | 19 | Martin Truex Jr. | Joe Gibbs Racing | Toyota | 9 |
| 3 | 88 | Alex Bowman | Hendrick Motorsports | Chevrolet | 8 |
| 4 | 2 | Brad Keselowski | Team Penske | Ford | 7 |
| 5 | 12 | Ryan Blaney | Team Penske | Ford | 6 |
| 6 | 95 | Christopher Bell (R) | Leavine Family Racing | Toyota | 5 |
| 7 | 3 | Austin Dillon | Richard Childress Racing | Chevrolet | 4 |
| 8 | 14 | Clint Bowyer | Stewart-Haas Racing | Ford | 3 |
| 9 | 47 | Ricky Stenhouse Jr. | JTG Daugherty Racing | Chevrolet | 2 |
| 10 | 4 | Kevin Harvick | Stewart-Haas Racing | Ford | 1 |
Official stage two results

=== Final Stage Results ===
Stage Three Laps: 124

| Pos | Grid | No | Driver | Team | Manufacturer | Laps | Points |
|---|---|---|---|---|---|---|---|
| 1 | 9 | 18 | Kyle Busch | Joe Gibbs Racing | Toyota | 334 | 50 |
| 2 | 6 | 19 | Martin Truex Jr. | Joe Gibbs Racing | Toyota | 334 | 53 |
| 3 | 15 | 95 | Christopher Bell (R) | Leavine Family Racing | Toyota | 334 | 39 |
| 4 | 10 | 12 | Ryan Blaney | Team Penske | Ford | 334 | 46 |
| 5 | 5 | 88 | Alex Bowman | Hendrick Motorsports | Chevrolet | 334 | 40 |
| 6 | 3 | 2 | Brad Keselowski | Team Penske | Ford | 334 | 38 |
| 7 | 8 | 1 | Kurt Busch | Chip Ganassi Racing | Chevrolet | 334 | 30 |
| 8 | 14 | 21 | Matt DiBenedetto | Wood Brothers Racing | Ford | 334 | 30 |
| 9 | 7 | 11 | Denny Hamlin | Joe Gibbs Racing | Toyota | 334 | 28 |
| 10 | 2 | 22 | Joey Logano | Team Penske | Ford | 334 | 30 |
| 11 | 12 | 3 | Austin Dillon | Richard Childress Racing | Chevrolet | 334 | 32 |
| 12 | 22 | 47 | Ricky Stenhouse Jr. | JTG Daugherty Racing | Chevrolet | 334 | 27 |
| 13 | 11 | 24 | William Byron | Hendrick Motorsports | Chevrolet | 334 | 29 |
| 14 | 16 | 41 | Cole Custer (R) | Stewart-Haas Racing | Ford | 334 | 23 |
| 15 | 19 | 8 | Tyler Reddick (R) | Richard Childress Racing | Chevrolet | 334 | 22 |
| 16 | 1 | 4 | Kevin Harvick | Stewart-Haas Racing | Ford | 333 | 22 |
| 17 | 21 | 14 | Clint Bowyer | Stewart-Haas Racing | Ford | 333 | 33 |
| 18 | 29 | 37 | Ryan Preece | JTG Daugherty Racing | Chevrolet | 333 | 19 |
| 19 | 25 | 6 | Ryan Newman | Roush Fenway Racing | Ford | 333 | 18 |
| 20 | 4 | 9 | Chase Elliott | Hendrick Motorsports | Chevrolet | 333 | 21 |
| 21 | 17 | 20 | Erik Jones | Joe Gibbs Racing | Toyota | 333 | 24 |
| 22 | 24 | 38 | John Hunter Nemechek (R) | Front Row Motorsports | Ford | 332 | 15 |
| 23 | 13 | 10 | Aric Almirola | Stewart-Haas Racing | Ford | 332 | 14 |
| 24 | 27 | 13 | Ty Dillon | Germain Racing | Chevrolet | 332 | 13 |
| 25 | 28 | 32 | Corey LaJoie | Go Fas Racing | Ford | 331 | 12 |
| 26 | 23 | 34 | Michael McDowell | Front Row Motorsports | Ford | 331 | 11 |
| 27 | 30 | 96 | Daniel Suárez | Gaunt Brothers Racing | Toyota | 328 | 10 |
| 28 | 31 | 15 | Brennan Poole (R) | Premium Motorsports | Chevrolet | 328 | 9 |
| 29 | 37 | 7 | Josh Bilicki (i) | Tommy Baldwin Racing | Chevrolet | 326 | 0 |
| 30 | 36 | 66 | Timmy Hill (i) | MBM Motorsports | Toyota | 325 | 0 |
| 31 | 38 | 53 | Garrett Smithley (i) | Rick Ware Racing | Ford | 325 | 0 |
| 32 | 35 | 77 | Reed Sorenson | Spire Motorsports | Chevrolet | 321 | 5 |
| 33 | 34 | 00 | Quin Houff (R) | StarCom Racing | Chevrolet | 316 | 4 |
| 34 | 20 | 17 | Chris Buescher | Roush Fenway Racing | Ford | 310 | 3 |
| 35 | 40 | 49 | Chad Finchum (i) | MBM Motorsports | Toyota | 310 | 0 |
| 36 | 26 | 48 | Jimmie Johnson | Hendrick Motorsports | Chevrolet | 279 | 7 |
| 37 | 39 | 51 | Joey Gase (i) | Petty Ware Racing | Ford | 184 | 0 |
| 38 | 18 | 43 | Bubba Wallace | Richard Petty Motorsports | Chevrolet | 59 | 1 |
| 39 | 32 | 42 | Matt Kenseth | Chip Ganassi Racing | Chevrolet | 59 | 1 |
| 40 | 33 | 27 | J. J. Yeley (i) | Rick Ware Racing | Chevrolet | 20 | 0 |
Official race results

=== Race statistics ===
- Lead changes: 23 among 11 different drivers
- Cautions/Laps: 8 for 47
- Red flags: 1 for 72 hours, 28 minutes and 34 seconds
- Time of race: 3 hours, 42 minutes and 14 seconds
- Average speed: 135.263 miles per hour (217.685 km/h)

== Media ==
=== Television ===
NBC Sports covered the race on the television side. Rick Allen, Two–time Texas winner Jeff Burton, Steve Letarte and 2000 Texas winner Dale Earnhardt Jr. called the action from the booth on Sunday. Allen, Burton and Letarte called the action from the booth on Wednesday. Dave Burns, Parker Kligerman and Kelli Stavast handled the pit road duties on Sunday, Kligerman and Marty Snider handled the pit road duties on Wednesday.

NBCSN
| Booth announcers | Pit reporters |
|---|---|
| Lap-by-lap: Rick Allen (Sunday and Wednesday); Color-commentator: Jeff Burton (Sunday and Wednesday); Color-commentator: Steve Letarte (Sunday and Wednesday); Color-commentator: Dale Earnhardt Jr. (Sunday) | Dave Burns (Sunday); Parker Kligerman (Sunday and Wednesday); Marty Snider (Wednesday); Kelli Stavast (Sunday) |

=== Radio ===
PRN covered their final 2020 broadcast, which was also simulcast on Sirius XM NASCAR Radio. Doug Rice & Mark Garrow covered the action for PRN when the field raced down the front straightaway. Rob Albright covered the action for PRN from a platform outside of Turns 1 & 2, & Pat Patterson covered the action from a platform outside of Turns 3 & 4 for PRN. Brad Gillie, Brett McMillan and Wendy Venturini had the call from pit lane for PRN.

PRN
| Booth announcers | Turn announcers | Pit reporters |
|---|---|---|
| Lead announcer: Doug Rice; Announcer: Mark Garrow | Turns 1 & 2: Rob Albright; Turns 3 & 4: Pat Patterson | Brad Gillie; Brett McMillan; Wendy Venturini |

== Standings after the race ==
Drivers' Championship standings

| | Pos | Driver | Points |
|---|---|---|---|
| | 1 | Kevin Harvick | 4,137 |
| | 2 | Denny Hamlin | 4,122 (–15) |
| | 3 | Brad Keselowski | 4,120 (–17) |
| 3 | 4 | Martin Truex Jr. | 4,104 (–33) |
| 1 | 5 | Alex Bowman | 4,095 (–42) |
| 2 | 6 | Chase Elliott | 4,095 (–42) |
| 2 | 7 | Joey Logano | 4,094 (–43) |
| | 8 | Kurt Busch | 4,039 (–98) |
| | 9 | Kyle Busch | 2,270 (–1,867) |
| 1 | 10 | Ryan Blaney | 2,251 (–1,986) |
| 1 | 11 | Austin Dillon | 2,244 (–1,893) |
| | 12 | William Byron | 2,213 (–1,924) |
| 1 | 13 | Clint Bowyer | 2,199 (–1,938) |
| 1 | 14 | Matt DiBenedetto | 2,190 (–1,947) |
| 2 | 15 | Aric Almirola | 2,181 (–1,956) |
| | 16 | Cole Custer | 2,169 (–1,968) |
Official driver's standings

Manufacturers' Championship standings

| Pos | Manufacturer | Points |
|---|---|---|
| 1 | Ford | 1,259 |
| 2 | Toyota | 1,197 (–62) |
| 3 | Chevrolet | 1,152 (–107) |

- Note: Only the first 16 positions are included for the driver standings.

| Previous race: 2020 Hollywood Casino 400 | NASCAR Cup Series; 2020 season | Next race: 2020 Xfinity 500 |
