= 2020 Bass Pro Shops NRA Night Race =

NASCAR Cup Series race

Race details
- Race 29 of 36 in the 2020 NASCAR Cup Series
- 2020 Bass Pro Shops NRA Night Race program cover
- Date: September 19, 2020
- Location: Bristol Motor Speedway in Bristol, Tennessee
- Course: Permanent racing facility
- Course length: .533 miles (.858 km)
- Distance: 500 laps, 266.5 mi (429 km)
- Average speed: 95.911 miles per hour (154.354 km/h)

Pole position
Driver	Brad Keselowski	Team Penske
- Grid positions set by competition-based formula

Most laps led
Driver	Kevin Harvick	Stewart-Haas Racing
- Laps: 226

Winner
No. 4	Kevin Harvick	Stewart-Haas Racing

Television in the United States
- Network: NBCSN
- Announcers: Rick Allen, Jeff Burton, Steve Letarte and Dale Earnhardt Jr.
- Nielsen ratings: 1.2 (2.12 million)

Radio in the United States
- Radio: PRN
- Booth announcers: Doug Rice and Mark Garrow
- Turn announcers: Rob Albright (Backstretch)

The 2020 Bass Pro Shops NRA Night Race was a NASCAR Cup Series race held on September 19, 2020 at Bristol Motor Speedway in Bristol, Tennessee. Contested over 500 laps on the .533-mile (0.858 km) short track, it was the 29th race of the 2020 NASCAR Cup Series season, third race of the Playoffs and final race of the Round of 16.

== Report ==
=== Background ===
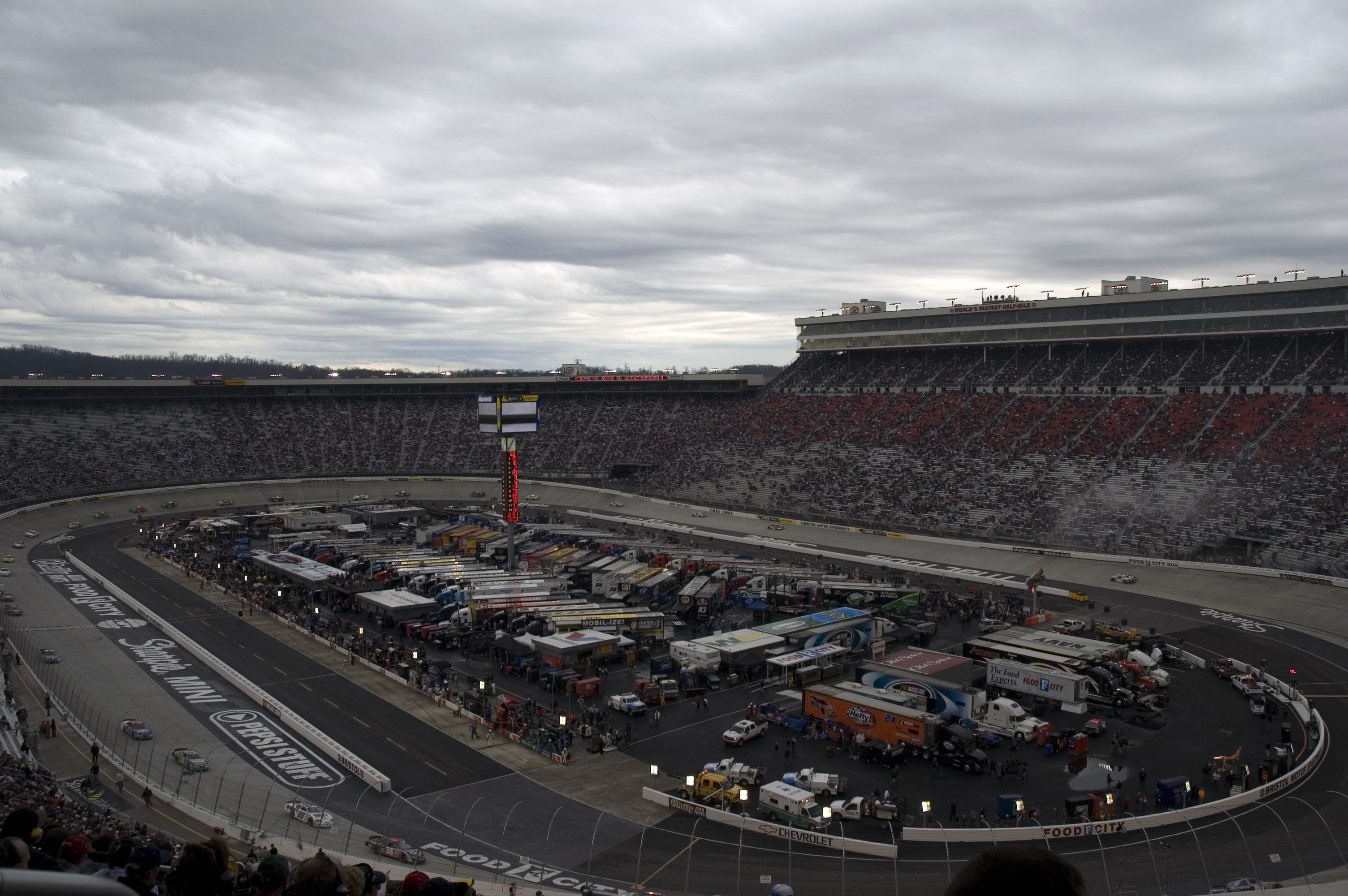
Bristol Motor Speedway, the track where the race was held.

The Bristol Motor Speedway, formerly known as Bristol International Raceway and Bristol Raceway, is a NASCAR short track venue located in Bristol, Tennessee. Constructed in 1960, it held its first NASCAR race on July 30, 1961. Despite its short length, Bristol is among the most popular tracks on the NASCAR schedule because of its distinct features, which include extraordinarily steep banking, an all concrete surface, two pit roads, and stadium-like seating. It has also been named one of the loudest NASCAR tracks.

==== Entry list ====
- (R) denotes rookie driver.
- (i) denotes driver who are ineligible for series driver points.

No.	Driver	Team	Manufacturer
00	Quin Houff (R)	StarCom Racing	Chevrolet
1	Kurt Busch	Chip Ganassi Racing	Chevrolet
2	Brad Keselowski	Team Penske	Ford
3	Austin Dillon	Richard Childress Racing	Chevrolet
4	Kevin Harvick	Stewart-Haas Racing	Ford
6	Ryan Newman	Roush Fenway Racing	Ford
7	Josh Bilicki (i)	Tommy Baldwin Racing	Chevrolet
8	Tyler Reddick (R)	Richard Childress Racing	Chevrolet
9	Chase Elliott	Hendrick Motorsports	Chevrolet
10	Aric Almirola	Stewart-Haas Racing	Ford
11	Denny Hamlin	Joe Gibbs Racing	Toyota
12	Ryan Blaney	Team Penske	Ford
13	Ty Dillon	Germain Racing	Chevrolet
14	Clint Bowyer	Stewart-Haas Racing	Ford
15	J. J. Yeley (i)	Premium Motorsports	Chevrolet
17	Chris Buescher	Roush Fenway Racing	Ford
18	Kyle Busch	Joe Gibbs Racing	Toyota
19	Martin Truex Jr.	Joe Gibbs Racing	Toyota
20	Erik Jones	Joe Gibbs Racing	Toyota
21	Matt DiBenedetto	Wood Brothers Racing	Ford
22	Joey Logano	Team Penske	Ford
24	William Byron	Hendrick Motorsports	Chevrolet
27	Gray Gaulding (i)	Rick Ware Racing	Ford
32	Corey LaJoie	Go Fas Racing	Ford
34	Michael McDowell	Front Row Motorsports	Ford
37	Ryan Preece	JTG Daugherty Racing	Chevrolet
38	John Hunter Nemechek (R)	Front Row Motorsports	Ford
41	Cole Custer (R)	Stewart-Haas Racing	Ford
42	Matt Kenseth	Chip Ganassi Racing	Chevrolet
43	Bubba Wallace	Richard Petty Motorsports	Chevrolet
47	Ricky Stenhouse Jr.	JTG Daugherty Racing	Chevrolet
48	Jimmie Johnson	Hendrick Motorsports	Chevrolet
51	Joey Gase (i)	Petty Ware Racing	Ford
53	James Davison	Rick Ware Racing	Chevrolet
66	Timmy Hill (i)	MBM Motorsports	Toyota
77	Reed Sorenson	Spire Motorsports	Chevrolet
78	Garrett Smithley (i)	B. J. McLeod Motorsports	Chevrolet
88	Alex Bowman	Hendrick Motorsports	Chevrolet
95	Christopher Bell (R)	Leavine Family Racing	Toyota
96	Daniel Suárez	Gaunt Brothers Racing	Toyota
Official entry list

== Qualifying ==
Brad Keselowski was awarded the pole for the race as determined by competition-based formula.

=== Starting Lineup ===
Pos	No.	Driver	Team	Manufacturer
1	2	Brad Keselowski	Team Penske	Ford
2	22	Joey Logano	Team Penske	Ford
3	19	Martin Truex Jr.	Joe Gibbs Racing	Toyota
4	4	Kevin Harvick	Stewart-Haas Racing	Ford
5	3	Austin Dillon	Richard Childress Racing	Chevrolet
6	9	Chase Elliott	Hendrick Motorsports	Chevrolet
7	11	Denny Hamlin	Joe Gibbs Racing	Toyota
8	88	Alex Bowman	Hendrick Motorsports	Chevrolet
9	18	Kyle Busch	Joe Gibbs Racing	Toyota
10	10	Aric Almirola	Stewart-Haas Racing	Ford
11	14	Clint Bowyer	Stewart-Haas Racing	Ford
12	41	Cole Custer (R)	Stewart-Haas Racing	Ford
13	1	Kurt Busch	Chip Ganassi Racing	Chevrolet
14	12	Ryan Blaney	Team Penske	Ford
15	24	William Byron	Hendrick Motorsports	Chevrolet
16	21	Matt DiBenedetto	Wood Brothers Racing	Ford
17	8	Tyler Reddick (R)	Richard Childress Racing	Chevrolet
18	95	Christopher Bell (R)	Leavine Family Racing	Toyota
19	42	Matt Kenseth	Chip Ganassi Racing	Chevrolet
20	20	Erik Jones	Joe Gibbs Racing	Toyota
21	47	Ricky Stenhouse Jr.	JTG Daugherty Racing	Chevrolet
22	37	Ryan Preece	JTG Daugherty Racing	Chevrolet
23	17	Chris Buescher	Roush Fenway Racing	Ford
24	48	Jimmie Johnson	Hendrick Motorsports	Chevrolet
25	6	Ryan Newman	Roush Fenway Racing	Ford
26	34	Michael McDowell	Front Row Motorsports	Ford
27	43	Bubba Wallace	Richard Petty Motorsports	Chevrolet
28	13	Ty Dillon	Germain Racing	Chevrolet
29	96	Daniel Suárez	Gaunt Brothers Racing	Toyota
30	32	Corey LaJoie	Go Fas Racing	Ford
31	38	John Hunter Nemechek (R)	Front Row Motorsports	Ford
32	15	J. J. Yeley (i)	Premium Motorsports	Chevrolet
33	00	Quin Houff (R)	StarCom Racing	Chevrolet
34	77	Reed Sorenson	Spire Motorsports	Chevrolet
35	53	James Davison	Rick Ware Racing	Chevrolet
36	51	Joey Gase (i)	Petty Ware Racing	Ford
37	27	Gray Gaulding (i)	Rick Ware Racing	Ford
38	66	Timmy Hill (i)	MBM Motorsports	Toyota
39	7	Josh Bilicki (i)	Tommy Baldwin Racing	Chevrolet
40	78	Garrett Smithley (i)	B. J. McLeod Motorsports	Chevrolet
Official starting lineup

== Race ==
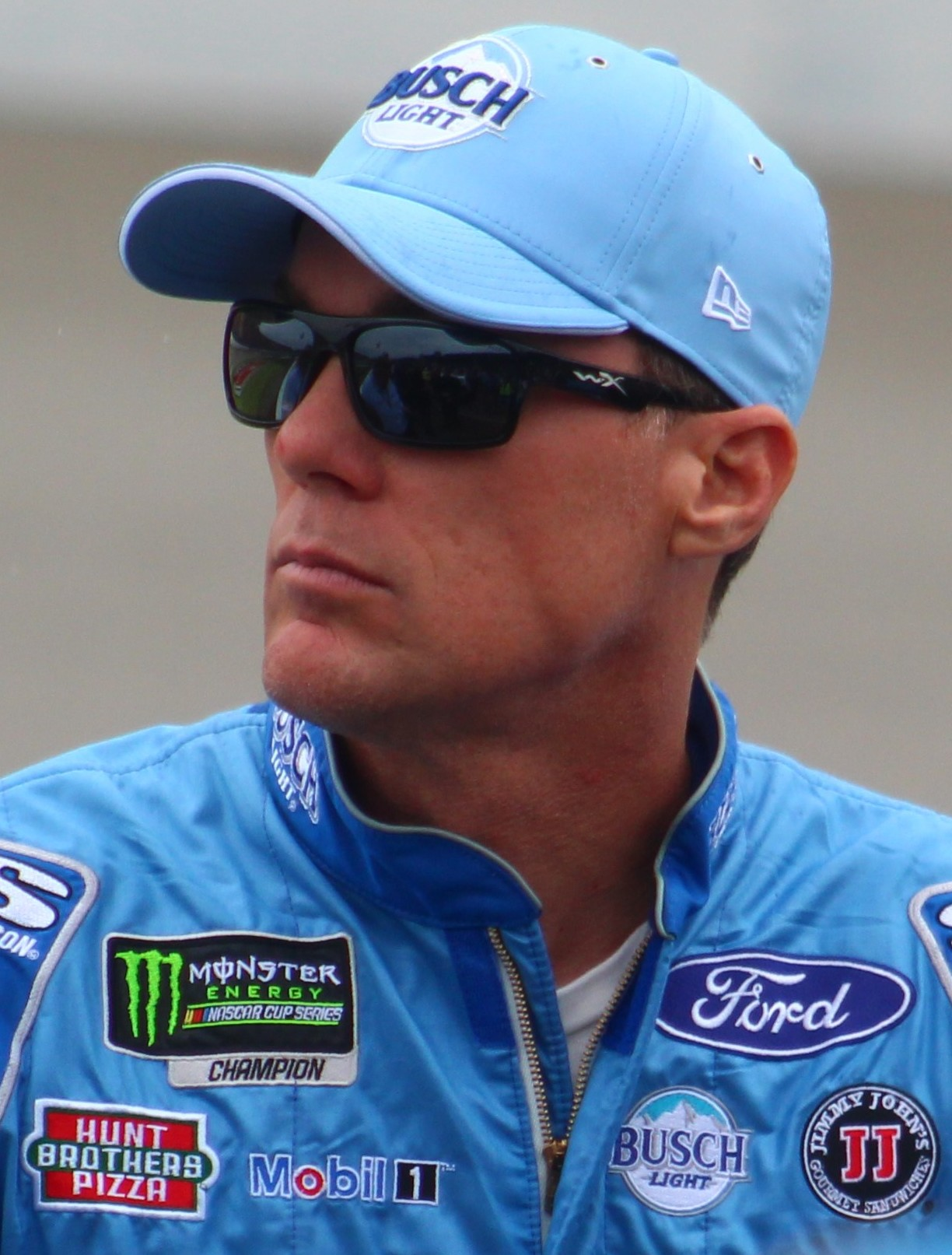
Kevin Harvick won the race.

=== Stage Results ===
Stage One Laps: 125

Pos	No	Driver	Team	Manufacturer	Points
1	9	Chase Elliott	Hendrick Motorsports	Chevrolet	10
2	18	Kyle Busch	Joe Gibbs Racing	Toyota	9
3	4	Kevin Harvick	Stewart-Haas Racing	Ford	8
4	88	Alex Bowman	Hendrick Motorsports	Chevrolet	7
5	95	Christopher Bell (R)	Leavine Family Racing	Toyota	6
6	1	Kurt Busch	Chip Ganassi Racing	Chevrolet	5
7	2	Brad Keselowski	Team Penske	Ford	4
8	24	William Byron	Hendrick Motorsports	Chevrolet	3
9	22	Joey Logano	Team Penske	Ford	2
10	43	Bubba Wallace	Richard Petty Motorsports	Chevrolet	1
Official stage one results

Stage Two Laps: 125

Pos	No	Driver	Team	Manufacturer	Points
1	18	Kyle Busch	Joe Gibbs Racing	Toyota	10
2	4	Kevin Harvick	Stewart-Haas Racing	Ford	9
3	9	Chase Elliott	Hendrick Motorsports	Chevrolet	8
4	22	Joey Logano	Team Penske	Ford	7
5	1	Kurt Busch	Chip Ganassi Racing	Chevrolet	6
6	88	Alex Bowman	Hendrick Motorsports	Chevrolet	5
7	10	Aric Almirola	Stewart-Haas Racing	Ford	4
8	14	Clint Bowyer	Stewart-Haas Racing	Ford	3
9	20	Erik Jones	Joe Gibbs Racing	Toyota	2
10	3	Austin Dillon	Richard Childress Racing	Chevrolet	1
Official stage two results

=== Final Stage Results ===
Stage Three Laps: 250

Pos	Grid	No	Driver	Team	Manufacturer	Laps	Points
1	4	4	Kevin Harvick	Stewart-Haas Racing	Ford	500	57
2	9	18	Kyle Busch	Joe Gibbs Racing	Toyota	500	54
3	20	20	Erik Jones	Joe Gibbs Racing	Toyota	500	36
4	17	8	Tyler Reddick (R)	Richard Childress Racing	Chevrolet	500	33
5	10	10	Aric Almirola	Stewart-Haas Racing	Ford	500	36
6	11	14	Clint Bowyer	Stewart-Haas Racing	Ford	500	34
7	6	9	Chase Elliott	Hendrick Motorsports	Chevrolet	499	48
8	23	17	Chris Buescher	Roush Fenway Racing	Ford	499	29
9	22	37	Ryan Preece	JTG Daugherty Racing	Chevrolet	499	28
10	26	34	Michael McDowell	Front Row Motorsports	Ford	498	27
11	2	22	Joey Logano	Team Penske	Ford	498	35
12	5	3	Austin Dillon	Richard Childress Racing	Chevrolet	498	26
13	14	12	Ryan Blaney	Team Penske	Ford	498	24
14	19	42	Matt Kenseth	Chip Ganassi Racing	Chevrolet	498	23
15	13	1	Kurt Busch	Chip Ganassi Racing	Chevrolet	498	33
16	8	88	Alex Bowman	Hendrick Motorsports	Chevrolet	498	33
17	24	48	Jimmie Johnson	Hendrick Motorsports	Chevrolet	498	20
18	28	13	Ty Dillon	Germain Racing	Chevrolet	497	19
19	16	21	Matt DiBenedetto	Wood Brothers Racing	Ford	497	18
20	31	38	John Hunter Nemechek (R)	Front Row Motorsports	Ford	497	17
21	7	11	Denny Hamlin	Joe Gibbs Racing	Toyota	497	16
22	27	43	Bubba Wallace	Richard Petty Motorsports	Chevrolet	497	16
23	12	41	Cole Custer (R)	Stewart-Haas Racing	Ford	497	14
24	3	19	Martin Truex Jr.	Joe Gibbs Racing	Toyota	496	13
25	25	6	Ryan Newman	Roush Fenway Racing	Ford	496	12
26	29	96	Daniel Suárez	Gaunt Brothers Racing	Toyota	495	11
27	37	27	Gray Gaulding (i)	Rick Ware Racing	Ford	488	0
28	18	95	Christopher Bell (R)	Leavine Family Racing	Toyota	487	15
29	33	00	Quin Houff (R)	StarCom Racing	Chevrolet	483	8
30	32	15	J. J. Yeley (i)	Premium Motorsports	Chevrolet	479	0
31	36	51	Joey Gase (i)	Petty Ware Racing	Ford	463	0
32	40	78	Garrett Smithley (i)	B. J. McLeod Motorsports	Chevrolet	436	0
33	30	32	Corey LaJoie	Go Fas Racing	Ford	419	4
34	1	2	Brad Keselowski	Team Penske	Ford	412	7
35	35	53	James Davison	Rick Ware Racing	Chevrolet	401	2
36	34	77	Reed Sorenson	Spire Motorsports	Chevrolet	317	1
37	38	66	Timmy Hill (i)	MBM Motorsports	Toyota	313	0
38	15	24	William Byron	Hendrick Motorsports	Chevrolet	232	4
39	39	7	Josh Bilicki (i)	Tommy Baldwin Racing	Chevrolet	53	0
40	21	47	Ricky Stenhouse Jr.	JTG Daugherty Racing	Chevrolet	28	1
Official race results

=== Race statistics ===
- Lead changes: 14 among 8 different drivers
- Cautions/Laps: 5 for 50
- Red flags: 0
- Time of race: 2 hours, 46 minutes and 43 seconds
- Average speed: 95.911 miles per hour (154.354 km/h)

== Media ==
=== Television ===
NBC Sports covered the race on the television side. Rick Allen, 2008 Food City 500 winner Jeff Burton, Steve Letarte and Dale Earnhardt Jr. covered the race from the booth at Charlotte Motor Speedway. Dave Burns, Marty Snider and Dillon Welch handled the pit road duties on site, and Rutledge Wood handled the features from the Busch Fan Zone at the racetrack during the race.

NBCSN
Booth announcers	Pit reporters	Features reporter
Lap-by-lap: Rick Allen; Color-commentator: Jeff Burton; Color-commentator: Steve Letarte; Color-commentator: Dale Earnhardt Jr.	Dave Burns; Marty Snider; Dillon Welch	Rutledge Wood

=== Radio ===
PRN had the radio call for the race, which was also simulcast on Sirius XM NASCAR Radio. Doug Rice and Mark Garrow called the race from the booth when the field races down the frontstretch. Rob Albright called the race when the field races down the backstretch. Brad Gillie, Brett McMillan and Wendy Venturini handled the duties on pit lane.

PRN
Booth announcers	Turn announcers	Pit reporters
Lead announcer: Doug Rice; Announcer: Mark Garrow	Backstretch: Rob Albright	Brad Gillie; Brett McMillan; Wendy Venturini

== Standings after the race ==
Drivers' Championship standings

	Pos	Driver	Points
	1	Kevin Harvick	3,067
	2	Denny Hamlin	3,048 (–19)
	3	Brad Keselowski	3,035 (–32)
	4	Joey Logano	3,022 (–45)
2	5	Chase Elliott	3,021 (–46)
1	6	Martin Truex Jr.	3,016 (–51)
1	7	Alex Bowman	3,009 (–58)
2	8	Austin Dillon	3,005 (–62)
1	9	Aric Almirola	3,005 (–62)
1	10	Kyle Busch	3,004 (–63)
1	11	Clint Bowyer	3,004 (–63)
1	12	Kurt Busch	3,001 (–66)
1	13	Cole Custer	2,067 (–1,000)
1	14	William Byron	2,062 (–1,005)
1	15	Ryan Blaney	2,058 (–1,009)
1	16	Matt DiBenedetto	2,054 (–1,013)
Official driver's standings

Manufacturers' Championship standings

Pos	Manufacturer	Points
1	Ford	1,084
2	Toyota	1,017 (–67)
3	Chevrolet	972 (–112)

- Note: Only the first 16 positions are included for the driver standings.

Previous race: 2020 Federated Auto Parts 400	NASCAR Cup Series; 2020 season	Next race: 2020 South Point 400
