= 2020 South Point 400 =

NASCAR Cup Series race

Race details
- Race 30 of 36 in the 2020 NASCAR Cup Series
- 2020 South Point 400 program cover
- Date: September 27, 2020
- Location: Las Vegas Motor Speedway in Las Vegas
- Course: Permanent racing facility
- Course length: 1.5 miles (2.4 km)
- Distance: 268 laps, 402 mi (643.2 km)
- Scheduled distance: 267 laps, 400.5 mi (640.8 km)
- Average speed: 131.42 miles per hour (211.50 km/h)

Pole position
Driver	Kevin Harvick	Stewart-Haas Racing
- Grid positions set by competition-based formula

Most laps led
Driver	Denny Hamlin	Joe Gibbs Racing
- Laps: 121

Winner
No. 1	Kurt Busch	Chip Ganassi Racing

Television in the United States
- Network: NBCSN
- Announcers: Rick Allen, Jeff Burton, Steve Letarte, Dale Earnhardt Jr. (Charlotte) and Brad Daugherty (Las Vegas)
- Nielsen ratings: 1.15 (1.97 million)

Radio in the United States
- Radio: PRN
- Booth announcers: Doug Rice and Mark Garrow
- Turn announcers: Rob Albright (1 & 2) and Pat Patterson (3 & 4)

The 2020 South Point 400 was a NASCAR Cup Series race held on September 27, 2020, at Las Vegas Motor Speedway in Las Vegas. Contested over 268 laps—extended from 267 laps due to an overtime finish, on the 1.5 mi (2.4 km) asphalt intermediate speedway, it was the 30th race of the 2020 NASCAR Cup Series season, the fourth race of the Playoffs, and the first race of the Round of 12.

== Report ==
=== Background ===
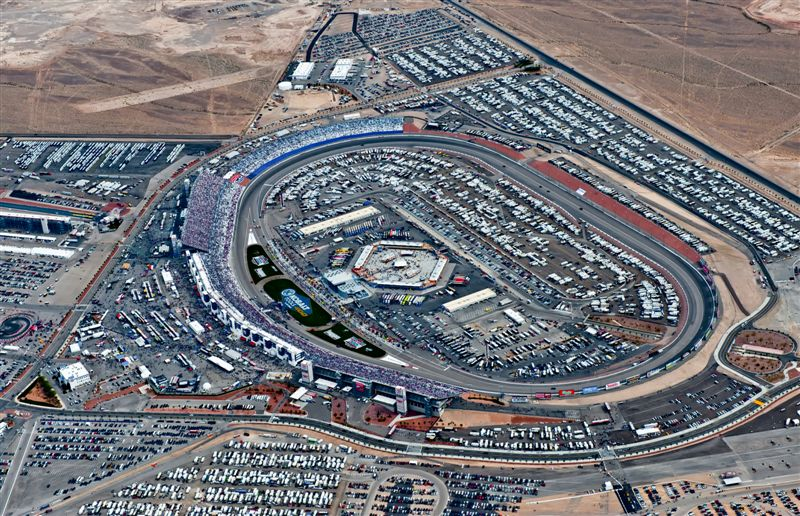
Las Vegas Motor Speedway, the track where the race is held.

Las Vegas Motor Speedway, located in Clark County, Nevada outside the Las Vegas city limits and about 15 miles northeast of the Las Vegas Strip, is a 1,200-acre (490 ha) complex of multiple tracks for motorsports racing. The complex is owned by Speedway Motorsports, Inc., which is headquartered in Charlotte, North Carolina.

==== Entry list ====
- (R) denotes rookie driver.
- (i) denotes driver who are ineligible for series driver points.

No.	Driver	Team	Manufacturer
00	Quin Houff (R)	StarCom Racing	Chevrolet
1	Kurt Busch	Chip Ganassi Racing	Chevrolet
2	Brad Keselowski	Team Penske	Ford
3	Austin Dillon	Richard Childress Racing	Chevrolet
4	Kevin Harvick	Stewart-Haas Racing	Ford
6	Ryan Newman	Roush Fenway Racing	Ford
8	Tyler Reddick (R)	Richard Childress Racing	Chevrolet
9	Chase Elliott	Hendrick Motorsports	Chevrolet
10	Aric Almirola	Stewart-Haas Racing	Ford
11	Denny Hamlin	Joe Gibbs Racing	Toyota
12	Ryan Blaney	Team Penske	Ford
13	Ty Dillon	Germain Racing	Chevrolet
14	Clint Bowyer	Stewart-Haas Racing	Ford
15	Brennan Poole (R)	Premium Motorsports	Chevrolet
17	Chris Buescher	Roush Fenway Racing	Ford
18	Kyle Busch	Joe Gibbs Racing	Toyota
19	Martin Truex Jr.	Joe Gibbs Racing	Toyota
20	Erik Jones	Joe Gibbs Racing	Toyota
21	Matt DiBenedetto	Wood Brothers Racing	Ford
22	Joey Logano	Team Penske	Ford
24	William Byron	Hendrick Motorsports	Chevrolet
27	Gray Gaulding (i)	Rick Ware Racing	Ford
32	Corey LaJoie	Go Fas Racing	Ford
34	Michael McDowell	Front Row Motorsports	Ford
37	Ryan Preece	JTG Daugherty Racing	Chevrolet
38	John Hunter Nemechek (R)	Front Row Motorsports	Ford
41	Cole Custer (R)	Stewart-Haas Racing	Ford
42	Matt Kenseth	Chip Ganassi Racing	Chevrolet
43	Bubba Wallace	Richard Petty Motorsports	Chevrolet
47	Ricky Stenhouse Jr.	JTG Daugherty Racing	Chevrolet
48	Jimmie Johnson	Hendrick Motorsports	Chevrolet
49	Chad Finchum (i)	MBM Motorsports	Toyota
51	Joey Gase (i)	Petty Ware Racing	Ford
53	Josh Bilicki (i)	Rick Ware Racing	Ford
66	Timmy Hill (i)	MBM Motorsports	Toyota
77	J. J. Yeley (i)	Spire Motorsports	Chevrolet
88	Alex Bowman	Hendrick Motorsports	Chevrolet
95	Christopher Bell (R)	Leavine Family Racing	Toyota
96	Daniel Suárez	Gaunt Brothers Racing	Toyota
Official entry list

== Qualifying ==
Kevin Harvick was awarded the pole for the race as determined by competition-based formula.

=== Starting Lineup ===
Pos	No.	Driver	Team	Manufacturer
1	4	Kevin Harvick	Stewart-Haas Racing	Ford
2	18	Kyle Busch	Joe Gibbs Racing	Toyota
3	9	Chase Elliott	Hendrick Motorsports	Chevrolet
4	10	Aric Almirola	Stewart-Haas Racing	Ford
5	22	Joey Logano	Team Penske	Ford
6	14	Clint Bowyer	Stewart-Haas Racing	Ford
7	3	Austin Dillon	Richard Childress Racing	Chevrolet
8	88	Alex Bowman	Hendrick Motorsports	Chevrolet
9	1	Kurt Busch	Chip Ganassi Racing	Chevrolet
10	11	Denny Hamlin	Joe Gibbs Racing	Toyota
11	19	Martin Truex Jr.	Joe Gibbs Racing	Toyota
12	2	Brad Keselowski	Team Penske	Ford
13	20	Erik Jones	Joe Gibbs Racing	Toyota
14	8	Tyler Reddick (R)	Richard Childress Racing	Chevrolet
15	12	Ryan Blaney	Team Penske	Ford
16	17	Chris Buescher	Roush Fenway Racing	Ford
17	34	Michael McDowell	Front Row Motorsports	Ford
18	48	Jimmie Johnson	Hendrick Motorsports	Chevrolet
19	21	Matt DiBenedetto	Wood Brothers Racing	Ford
20	42	Matt Kenseth	Chip Ganassi Racing	Chevrolet
21	37	Ryan Preece	JTG Daugherty Racing	Chevrolet
22	41	Cole Custer (R)	Stewart-Haas Racing	Ford
23	43	Bubba Wallace	Richard Petty Motorsports	Chevrolet
24	13	Ty Dillon	Germain Racing	Chevrolet
25	38	John Hunter Nemechek (R)	Front Row Motorsports	Ford
26	95	Christopher Bell (R)	Leavine Family Racing	Toyota
27	6	Ryan Newman	Roush Fenway Racing	Ford
28	24	William Byron	Hendrick Motorsports	Chevrolet
29	96	Daniel Suárez	Gaunt Brothers Racing	Toyota
30	27	Gray Gaulding (i)	Rick Ware Racing	Ford
31	32	Corey LaJoie	Go Fas Racing	Ford
32	00	Quin Houff (R)	StarCom Racing	Chevrolet
33	47	Ricky Stenhouse Jr.	JTG Daugherty Racing	Chevrolet
34	51	Joey Gase (i)	Petty Ware Racing	Ford
35	15	Brennan Poole (R)	Premium Motorsports	Chevrolet
36	66	Timmy Hill (i)	MBM Motorsports	Toyota
37	77	J. J. Yeley (i)	Spire Motorsports	Chevrolet
38	53	Josh Bilicki (i)	Rick Ware Racing	Ford
39	49	Chad Finchum (i)	MBM Motorsports	Toyota
Official starting lineup

== Race ==
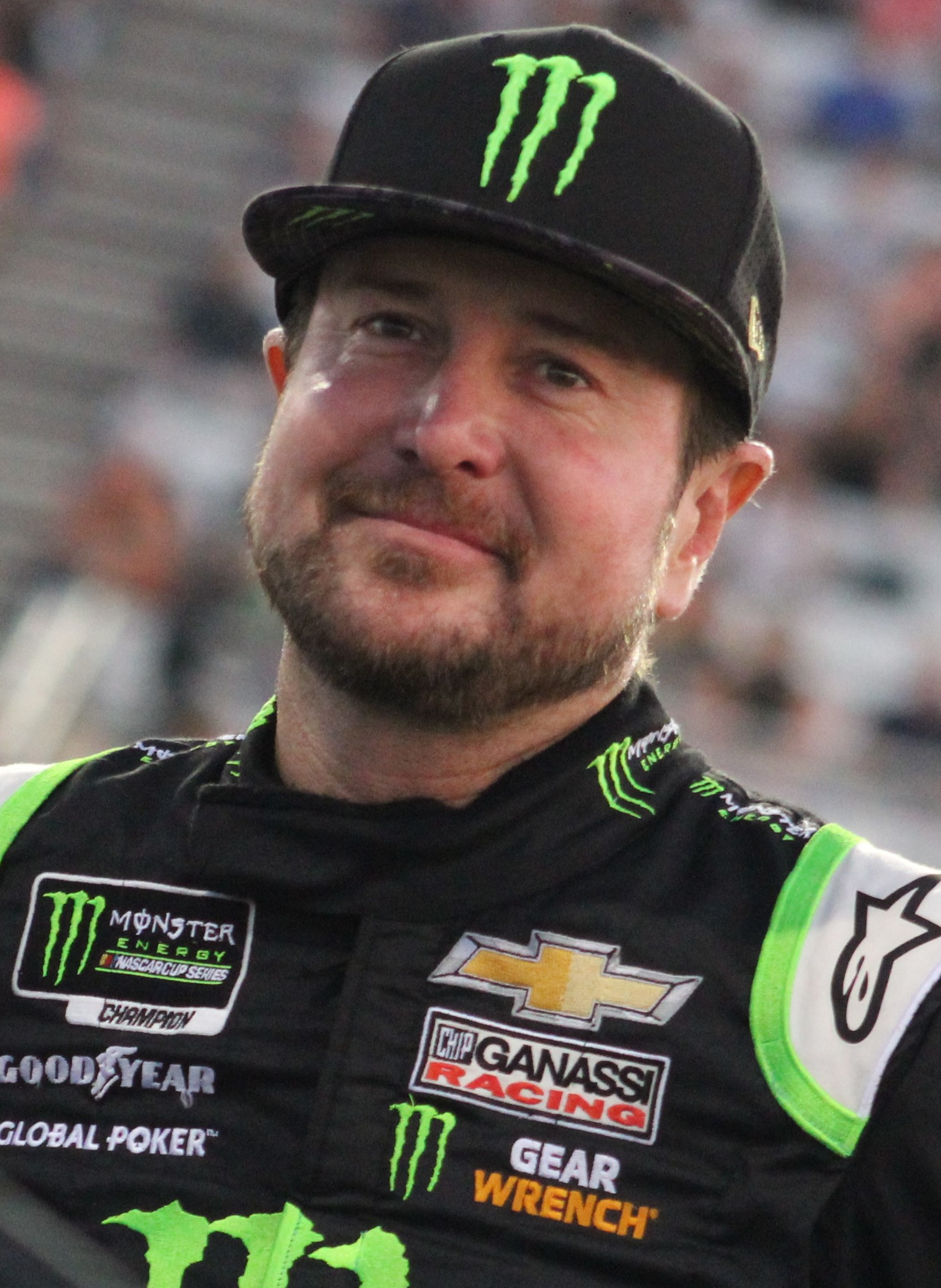
Kurt Busch won the race and now owns the race winning car. Busch will drive the 2026 Le Mans Classic with it, renumbered No. 8 as a tribute to his brother.

=== Stage Results ===
Stage One Laps: 80

Pos	No	Driver	Team	Manufacturer	Points
1	11	Denny Hamlin	Joe Gibbs Racing	Toyota	10
2	22	Joey Logano	Team Penske	Ford	9
3	18	Kyle Busch	Joe Gibbs Racing	Toyota	8
4	9	Chase Elliott	Hendrick Motorsports	Chevrolet	7
5	4	Kevin Harvick	Stewart-Haas Racing	Ford	6
6	3	Austin Dillon	Richard Childress Racing	Chevrolet	5
7	12	Ryan Blaney	Team Penske	Ford	4
8	88	Alex Bowman	Hendrick Motorsports	Chevrolet	3
9	19	Martin Truex Jr.	Joe Gibbs Racing	Toyota	2
10	14	Clint Bowyer	Stewart-Haas Racing	Ford	1
Official stage one results

Stage Two Laps: 80

Pos	No	Driver	Team	Manufacturer	Points
1	9	Chase Elliott	Hendrick Motorsports	Chevrolet	10
2	11	Denny Hamlin	Joe Gibbs Racing	Toyota	9
3	88	Alex Bowman	Hendrick Motorsports	Chevrolet	8
4	19	Martin Truex Jr.	Joe Gibbs Racing	Toyota	7
5	12	Ryan Blaney	Team Penske	Ford	6
6	3	Austin Dillon	Richard Childress Racing	Chevrolet	5
7	4	Kevin Harvick	Stewart-Haas Racing	Ford	4
8	21	Matt DiBenedetto	Wood Brothers Racing	Ford	3
9	14	Clint Bowyer	Stewart-Haas Racing	Ford	2
10	24	William Byron	Hendrick Motorsports	Chevrolet	1
Official stage two results

=== Final Stage Results ===
Stage Three Laps: 107

Pos	Grid	No	Driver	Team	Manufacturer	Laps	Points
1	9	1	Kurt Busch	Chip Ganassi Racing	Chevrolet	268	40
2	19	21	Matt DiBenedetto	Wood Brothers Racing	Ford	268	38
3	10	11	Denny Hamlin	Joe Gibbs Racing	Toyota	268	53
4	11	19	Martin Truex Jr.	Joe Gibbs Racing	Toyota	268	42
5	8	88	Alex Bowman	Hendrick Motorsports	Chevrolet	268	43
6	2	18	Kyle Busch	Joe Gibbs Racing	Toyota	268	39
7	15	12	Ryan Blaney	Team Penske	Ford	268	40
8	13	20	Erik Jones	Joe Gibbs Racing	Toyota	268	29
9	16	17	Chris Buescher	Roush Fenway Racing	Ford	268	28
10	1	4	Kevin Harvick	Stewart-Haas Racing	Ford	268	37
11	18	48	Jimmie Johnson	Hendrick Motorsports	Chevrolet	268	26
12	6	14	Clint Bowyer	Stewart-Haas Racing	Ford	268	28
13	12	2	Brad Keselowski	Team Penske	Ford	268	24
14	5	22	Joey Logano	Team Penske	Ford	268	32
15	27	6	Ryan Newman	Roush Fenway Racing	Ford	268	22
16	22	41	Cole Custer (R)	Stewart-Haas Racing	Ford	268	21
17	4	10	Aric Almirola	Stewart-Haas Racing	Ford	268	20
18	20	42	Matt Kenseth	Chip Ganassi Racing	Chevrolet	268	19
19	21	37	Ryan Preece	JTG Daugherty Racing	Chevrolet	268	18
20	25	38	John Hunter Nemechek (R)	Front Row Motorsports	Ford	268	17
21	17	34	Michael McDowell	Front Row Motorsports	Ford	268	16
22	3	9	Chase Elliott	Hendrick Motorsports	Chevrolet	268	32
23	33	47	Ricky Stenhouse Jr.	JTG Daugherty Racing	Chevrolet	268	14
24	26	95	Christopher Bell (R)	Leavine Family Racing	Chevrolet	268	13
25	28	24	William Byron	Hendrick Motorsports	Chevrolet	268	13
26	24	13	Ty Dillon	Germain Racing	Chevrolet	267	11
27	31	32	Corey LaJoie	Go Fas Racing	Ford	267	10
28	23	43	Bubba Wallace	Richard Petty Motorsports	Chevrolet	266	9
29	29	96	Daniel Suárez	Gaunt Brothers Racing	Toyota	265	8
30	35	15	Brennan Poole (R)	Premium Motorsports	Chevrolet	265	7
31	30	27	Gray Gaulding (i)	Rick Ware Racing	Ford	262	0
32	7	3	Austin Dillon	Richard Childress Racing	Chevrolet	261	15
33	37	77	J. J. Yeley (i)	Spire Motorsports	Chevrolet	261	0
34	32	00	Quin Houff (R)	StarCom Racing	Chevrolet	259	3
35	34	51	Joey Gase (i)	Petty Ware Racing	Ford	256	0
36	38	53	Josh Bilicki (i)	Rick Ware Racing	Ford	227	0
37	36	66	Timmy Hill (i)	MBM Motorsports	Toyota	160	0
38	14	8	Tyler Reddick (R)	Richard Childress Racing	Chevrolet	157	1
39	39	49	Chad Finchum (i)	MBM Motorsports	Toyota	19	0
Official race results

=== Race statistics ===
- Lead changes: 20 among 11 different drivers
- Cautions/Laps: 7 for 36
- Red flags: 0
- Time of race: 3 hours, 3 minutes and 32 seconds
- Average speed: 131.42 miles per hour (211.50 km/h)

== Media ==
=== Television ===
NBC Sports covered the race on the television side. Rick Allen, Jeff Burton, Steve Letarte and Dale Earnhardt Jr. called the action from the booth at Charlotte Motor Speedway. Brad Daugherty called the action on site. Marty Snider and Kelli Stavast handled the pit road duties on site, and Dave Burns handled pit road duties from Charlotte Motor Speedway during the race.

NBCSN
Booth announcers	Pit reporters	Charlotte pit reporter
Lap-by-lap: Rick Allen; Color-commentator: Jeff Burton; Color-commentator: Steve Letarte; Color-commentator: Dale Earnhardt Jr. On-Site analyst: Brad Daugherty	Marty Snider; Kelli Stavast	Dave Burns

=== Radio ===
PRN had the radio call for the race, which will also simulcast on Sirius XM NASCAR Radio. Doug Rice and Mark Garrow called the race from the booth when the field raced through the tri-oval. Rob Albright called the race from a billboard in turn 2 when the field raced through turns 1 and 2 & Pat Patterson called the race from a billboard outside of turn 3 when the field raced through turns 3 and 4. Brad Gillie and Brett McMillan handled the duties on pit lane.

PRN
Booth announcers	Turn announcers	Pit reporters
Lead announcer: Doug Rice; Announcer: Mark Garrow	Turns 1 & 2: Rob Albright; Turns 3 & 4: Pat Patterson	Brad Gillie; Brett McMillan

== Standings after the race ==
Drivers' Championship standings

	Pos	Driver	Points
	1	Kevin Harvick	3,104
	2	Denny Hamlin	3,101 (–3)
	3	Brad Keselowski	3,059 (–45)
2	4	Martin Truex Jr.	3,058 (–46)
1	5	Joey Logano	3,054 (–50)
1	6	Chase Elliott	3,053 (–51)
	7	Alex Bowman	3,052 (–52)
2	8	Kyle Busch	3,043 (–61)
3	9	Kurt Busch	3,041 (–63)
1	10	Clint Bowyer	3,032 (–72)
2	11	Aric Almirola	3,025 (–79)
4	12	Austin Dillon	3,020 (–84)
2	13	Ryan Blaney	2,098 (–1,006)
2	14	Matt DiBenedetto	2,092 (–1,012)
2	15	Cole Custer	2,088 (–1,016)
2	16	William Byron	2,075 (–1,029)
Official driver's standings

Manufacturers' Championship standings

Pos	Manufacturer	Points
1	Ford	1,119
2	Toyota	1,051 (–68)
3	Chevrolet	1,012 (–107)

- Note: Only the first 16 positions are included for the driver standings.

Previous race: 2020 Bass Pro Shops NRA Night Race	NASCAR Cup Series; 2020 season	Next race: 2020 YellaWood 500
