= 2020 Hollywood Casino 400 =

NASCAR Cup Series race

Race details
- Race 33 of 36 in the 2020 NASCAR Cup Series
- 2020 Hollywood Casino 400 program cover
- Date: October 18, 2020
- Location: Kansas Speedway in Kansas City, Kansas
- Course: Permanent racing facility
- Course length: 1.5 miles (2.4 km)
- Distance: 267 laps, 400.5 mi (640.8 km)
- Average speed: 138.329 miles per hour (222.619 km/h)

Pole position
Driver	Chase Elliott	Hendrick Motorsports
- Grid positions set by competition-based formula

Most laps led
Driver	Kevin Harvick	Stewart-Haas Racing
- Laps: 85

Winner
No. 22	Joey Logano	Team Penske

Television in the United States
- Network: NBC
- Announcers: Rick Allen, Jeff Burton, Steve Letarte and Dale Earnhardt Jr.
- Nielsen ratings: 2.511 million

Radio in the United States
- Radio: MRN
- Booth announcers: Alex Hayden and Jeff Striegle
- Turn announcers: Dave Moody (1 & 2) and Mike Bagley (3 & 4)

The 2020 Hollywood Casino 400 is a NASCAR Cup Series race that was held on October 18, 2020 at Kansas Speedway in Kansas City, Kansas. Contested over 267 laps on the 1.5 mi (2.4 km) intermediate speedway, it was the 33rd race of the 2020 NASCAR Cup Series season, the seventh race of the Playoffs, and first race of the Round of 8.

== Report ==
=== Background ===
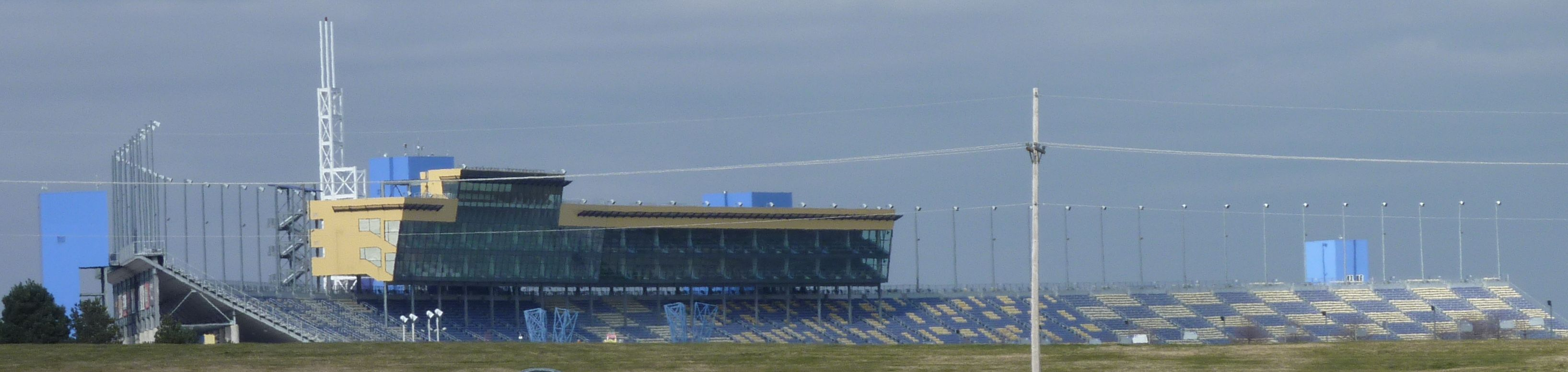
Kansas Speedway, the track where the race was held.

Kansas Speedway is a 1.5-mile (2.4 km) tri-oval race track in Kansas City, Kansas. It was built in 2001 and it currently hosts two annual NASCAR race weekends. The Verizon IndyCar Series also raced at here until 2011. The speedway is owned and operated by the International Speedway Corporation.

==== Entry list ====
- (R) denotes rookie driver.
- (i) denotes driver who are ineligible for series driver points.

No.	Driver	Team	Manufacturer
00	Quin Houff (R)	StarCom Racing	Chevrolet
1	Kurt Busch	Chip Ganassi Racing	Chevrolet
2	Brad Keselowski	Team Penske	Ford
3	Austin Dillon	Richard Childress Racing	Chevrolet
4	Kevin Harvick	Stewart-Haas Racing	Ford
6	Ryan Newman	Roush Fenway Racing	Ford
7	Josh Bilicki (i)	Tommy Baldwin Racing	Chevrolet
8	Tyler Reddick (R)	Richard Childress Racing	Chevrolet
9	Chase Elliott	Hendrick Motorsports	Chevrolet
10	Aric Almirola	Stewart-Haas Racing	Ford
11	Denny Hamlin	Joe Gibbs Racing	Toyota
12	Ryan Blaney	Team Penske	Ford
13	Ty Dillon	Germain Racing	Chevrolet
14	Clint Bowyer	Stewart-Haas Racing	Ford
15	Brennan Poole (R)	Premium Motorsports	Chevrolet
17	Chris Buescher	Roush Fenway Racing	Ford
18	Kyle Busch	Joe Gibbs Racing	Toyota
19	Martin Truex Jr.	Joe Gibbs Racing	Toyota
20	Erik Jones	Joe Gibbs Racing	Toyota
21	Matt DiBenedetto	Wood Brothers Racing	Ford
22	Joey Logano	Team Penske	Ford
24	William Byron	Hendrick Motorsports	Chevrolet
27	J. J. Yeley (i)	Rick Ware Racing	Chevrolet
32	Corey LaJoie	Go Fas Racing	Ford
34	Michael McDowell	Front Row Motorsports	Ford
37	Ryan Preece	JTG Daugherty Racing	Chevrolet
38	John Hunter Nemechek (R)	Front Row Motorsports	Ford
41	Cole Custer (R)	Stewart-Haas Racing	Ford
42	Matt Kenseth	Chip Ganassi Racing	Chevrolet
43	Bubba Wallace	Richard Petty Motorsports	Chevrolet
47	Ricky Stenhouse Jr.	JTG Daugherty Racing	Chevrolet
48	Jimmie Johnson	Hendrick Motorsports	Chevrolet
49	Chad Finchum (i)	MBM Motorsports	Toyota
51	Joey Gase (i)	Petty Ware Racing	Ford
53	James Davison	Rick Ware Racing	Ford
66	Timmy Hill (i)	MBM Motorsports	Toyota
77	Reed Sorenson	Spire Motorsports	Chevrolet
88	Alex Bowman	Hendrick Motorsports	Chevrolet
95	Christopher Bell (R)	Leavine Family Racing	Toyota
96	Daniel Suárez	Gaunt Brothers Racing	Toyota
Official entry list

== Qualifying ==
Chase Elliott was awarded the pole for the race as determined by competition-based formula.

=== Starting Lineup ===
Pos	No.	Driver	Team	Manufacturer
1	9	Chase Elliott	Hendrick Motorsports	Chevrolet
2	22	Joey Logano	Team Penske	Ford
3	1	Kurt Busch	Chip Ganassi Racing	Chevrolet
4	4	Kevin Harvick	Stewart-Haas Racing	Ford
5	19	Martin Truex Jr.	Joe Gibbs Racing	Toyota
6	88	Alex Bowman	Hendrick Motorsports	Chevrolet
7	11	Denny Hamlin	Joe Gibbs Racing	Toyota
8	2	Brad Keselowski	Team Penske	Ford
9	12	Ryan Blaney	Team Penske	Ford
10	24	William Byron	Hendrick Motorsports	Chevrolet
11	20	Erik Jones	Joe Gibbs Racing	Toyota
12	14	Clint Bowyer	Stewart-Haas Racing	Ford
13	41	Cole Custer (R)	Stewart-Haas Racing	Ford
14	48	Jimmie Johnson	Hendrick Motorsports	Chevrolet
15	8	Tyler Reddick (R)	Richard Childress Racing	Chevrolet
16	10	Aric Almirola	Stewart-Haas Racing	Ford
17	3	Austin Dillon	Richard Childress Racing	Chevrolet
18	21	Matt DiBenedetto	Wood Brothers Racing	Ford
19	37	Ryan Preece	JTG Daugherty Racing	Chevrolet
20	18	Kyle Busch	Joe Gibbs Racing	Toyota
21	17	Chris Buescher	Roush Fenway Racing	Ford
22	95	Christopher Bell (R)	Leavine Family Racing	Toyota
23	47	Ricky Stenhouse Jr.	JTG Daugherty Racing	Chevrolet
24	43	Bubba Wallace	Richard Petty Motorsports	Chevrolet
25	13	Ty Dillon	Germain Racing	Chevrolet
26	34	Michael McDowell	Front Row Motorsports	Ford
27	96	Daniel Suárez	Gaunt Brothers Racing	Toyota
28	6	Ryan Newman	Roush Fenway Racing	Ford
29	32	Corey LaJoie	Go Fas Racing	Ford
30	42	Matt Kenseth	Chip Ganassi Racing	Chevrolet
31	00	Quin Houff (R)	StarCom Racing	Chevrolet
32	38	John Hunter Nemechek (R)	Front Row Motorsports	Ford
33	53	James Davison	Rick Ware Racing	Ford
34	27	J. J. Yeley (i)	Rick Ware Racing	Chevrolet
35	15	Brennan Poole (R)	Premium Motorsports	Chevrolet
36	77	Reed Sorenson	Spire Motorsports	Chevrolet
37	66	Timmy Hill (i)	MBM Motorsports	Toyota
38	51	Joey Gase (i)	Petty Ware Racing	Ford
39	7	Josh Bilicki (i)	Tommy Baldwin Racing	Chevrolet
40	49	Chad Finchum (i)	MBM Motorsports	Toyota
Official starting lineup

== Race ==
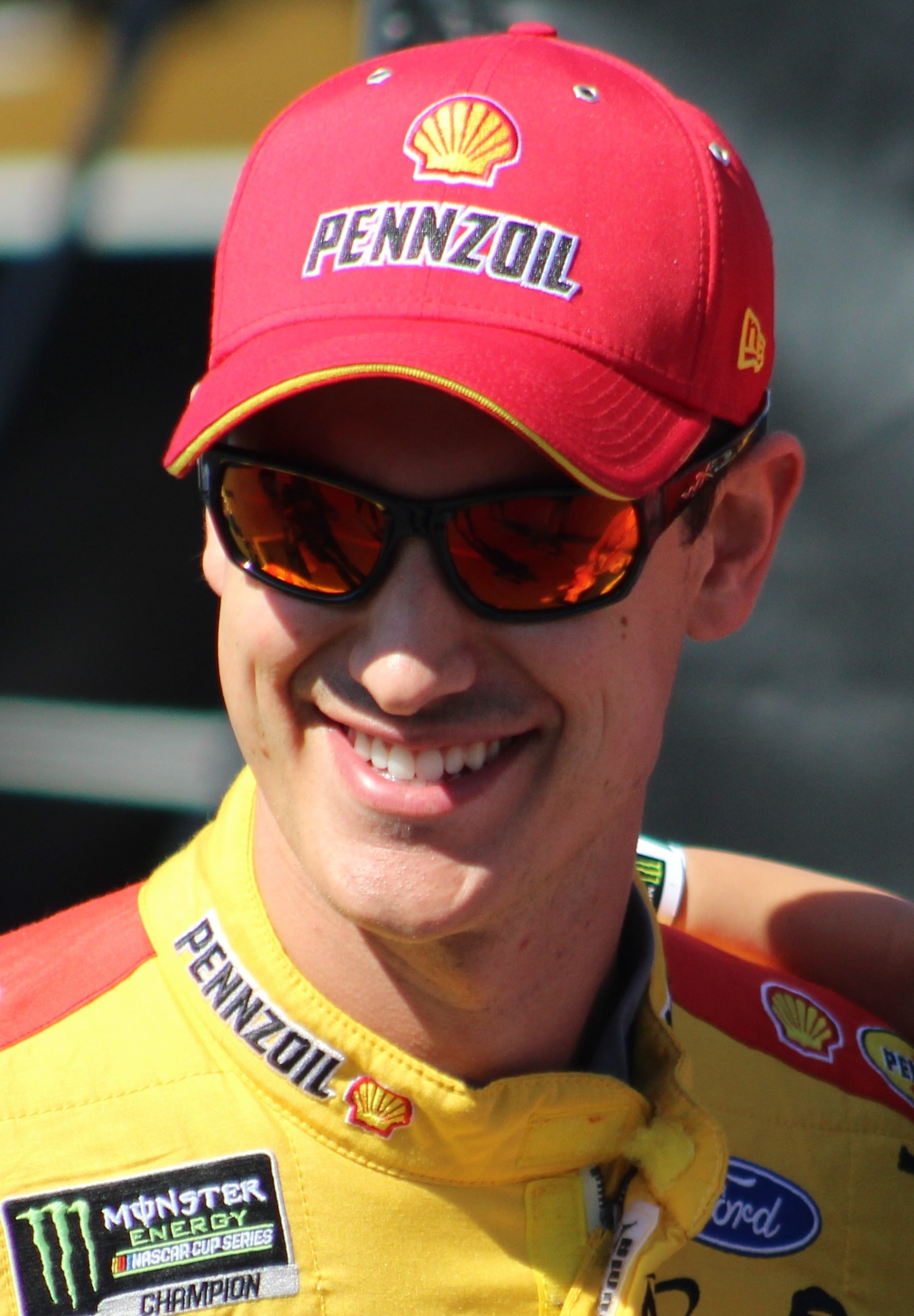
Joey Logano won the race.

=== Stage Results ===
Stage One Laps: 80

Pos	No	Driver	Team	Manufacturer	Points
1	9	Chase Elliott	Hendrick Motorsports	Chevrolet	10
2	2	Brad Keselowski	Team Penske	Ford	9
3	11	Denny Hamlin	Joe Gibbs Racing	Toyota	8
4	12	Ryan Blaney	Team Penske	Ford	7
5	20	Erik Jones	Joe Gibbs Racing	Toyota	6
6	88	Alex Bowman	Hendrick Motorsports	Chevrolet	5
7	4	Kevin Harvick	Stewart-Haas Racing	Ford	4
8	19	Martin Truex Jr.	Joe Gibbs Racing	Toyota	3
9	22	Joey Logano	Team Penske	Ford	2
10	18	Kyle Busch	Joe Gibbs Racing	Toyota	1
Official stage one results

Stage Two Laps: 80

Pos	No	Driver	Team	Manufacturer	Points
1	11	Denny Hamlin	Joe Gibbs Racing	Toyota	10
2	4	Kevin Harvick	Stewart-Haas Racing	Ford	9
3	12	Ryan Blaney	Team Penske	Ford	8
4	88	Alex Bowman	Hendrick Motorsports	Chevrolet	7
5	9	Chase Elliott	Hendrick Motorsports	Chevrolet	6
6	2	Brad Keselowski	Team Penske	Ford	5
7	21	Matt DiBenedetto	Wood Brothers Racing	Ford	4
8	19	Martin Truex Jr.	Joe Gibbs Racing	Toyota	3
9	1	Kurt Busch	Chip Ganassi Racing	Chevrolet	2
10	14	Clint Bowyer	Stewart-Haas Racing	Ford	1
Official stage two results

=== Final Stage results ===
Stage Three Laps: 107

Pos	Grid	No	Driver	Team	Manufacturer	Laps	Points
1	2	22	Joey Logano	Team Penske	Ford	267	42
2	4	4	Kevin Harvick	Stewart-Haas Racing	Ford	267	48
3	6	88	Alex Bowman	Hendrick Motorsports	Chevrolet	267	46
4	8	2	Brad Keselowski	Team Penske	Ford	267	47
5	20	18	Kyle Busch	Joe Gibbs Racing	Toyota	267	33
6	1	9	Chase Elliott	Hendrick Motorsports	Chevrolet	267	47
7	9	12	Ryan Blaney	Team Penske	Ford	267	45
8	10	24	William Byron	Hendrick Motorsports	Chevrolet	267	29
9	5	19	Martin Truex Jr.	Joe Gibbs Racing	Toyota	267	34
10	22	95	Christopher Bell (R)	Leavine Family Racing	Toyota	267	27
11	17	3	Austin Dillon	Richard Childress Racing	Chevrolet	267	26
12	18	21	Matt DiBenedetto	Wood Brothers Racing	Ford	267	29
13	16	10	Aric Almirola	Stewart-Haas Racing	Ford	267	24
14	13	41	Cole Custer (R)	Stewart-Haas Racing	Ford	267	23
15	7	11	Denny Hamlin	Joe Gibbs Racing	Toyota	267	40
16	23	47	Ricky Stenhouse Jr.	JTG Daugherty Racing	Chevrolet	267	21
17	32	38	John Hunter Nemechek (R)	Front Row Motorsports	Ford	267	20
18	24	43	Bubba Wallace	Richard Petty Motorsports	Chevrolet	267	19
19	26	34	Michael McDowell	Front Row Motorsports	Ford	267	18
20	11	20	Erik Jones	Joe Gibbs Racing	Toyota	267	23
21	21	17	Chris Buescher	Roush Fenway Racing	Ford	267	16
22	28	6	Ryan Newman	Roush Fenway Racing	Ford	267	15
23	29	32	Corey LaJoie	Go Fas Racing	Ford	267	14
24	25	13	Ty Dillon	Germain Racing	Chevrolet	266	13
25	15	8	Tyler Reddick (R)	Richard Childress Racing	Chevrolet	266	12
26	12	14	Clint Bowyer	Stewart-Haas Racing	Ford	266	12
27	27	96	Daniel Suárez	Gaunt Brothers Racing	Toyota	265	10
28	35	15	Brennan Poole (R)	Premium Motorsports	Chevrolet	263	9
29	19	37	Ryan Preece	JTG Daugherty Racing	Chevrolet	262	8
30	34	27	J. J. Yeley (i)	Rick Ware Racing	Chevrolet	261	0
31	14	48	Jimmie Johnson	Hendrick Motorsports	Chevrolet	261	6
32	33	53	James Davison	Rick Ware Racing	Ford	258	5
33	31	00	Quin Houff (R)	StarCom Racing	Chevrolet	258	4
34	37	66	Timmy Hill (i)	MBM Motorsports	Toyota	256	0
35	39	7	Josh Bilicki (i)	Tommy Baldwin Racing	Chevrolet	254	0
36	36	77	Reed Sorenson	Spire Motorsports	Chevrolet	250	1
37	38	51	Joey Gase (i)	Petty Ware Racing	Ford	228	0
38	3	1	Kurt Busch	Chip Ganassi Racing	Chevrolet	197	3
39	40	49	Chad Finchum (i)	MBM Motorsports	Toyota	154	0
40	30	42	Matt Kenseth	Chip Ganassi Racing	Chevrolet	144	1
Official race results

The closing laps were met with disdain from some in the journalism and fan ranks, who suggested that the NA18D aerodynamics package used for the race prevented the best driver from winning the race.

=== Race statistics ===
- Lead changes: 17 among 11 different drivers
- Cautions/Laps: 6 for 31
- Red flags: 0
- Time of race: 2 hours, 53 minutes and 43 seconds
- Average speed: 138.329 miles per hour (222.619 km/h)

== Media ==
=== Television ===
NBC Sports covered the race on the television side. Rick Allen, Jeff Burton, Steve Letarte and Dale Earnhardt Jr. called the action from the booth, the first time since the March Phoenix round that commentators have been on site other than Charlotte. Dave Burns, Parker Kligerman and Marty Snider handled the pit road duties, Rutledge Wood and Super Bowl XLVII champion Bernard Pollard handled the features from their homes during the race.

NBC
Booth announcers	Pit reporters	Features reporters
Lap-by-lap: Rick Allen; Color-commentator: Jeff Burton; Color-commentator: Steve Letarte; Color-commentator: Dale Earnhardt Jr.	Dave Burns; Parker Kligerman; Marty Snider	Rutledge Wood; Bernard Pollard

=== Radio ===
MRN had the radio call for the race, which was simulcast on Sirius XM NASCAR Radio. Alex Hayden and Jeff Striegle called the race for MRN when the field raced thru the front straightaway. Dave Moody called the race for MRN from Turns 1 & 2, and Mike Bagley called the race for MRN from turns 3 & 4. Winston Kelley and Steve Post covered the action for MRN from pit lane.

MRN
Booth announcers	Turn announcers	Pit reporters
Lead announcer: Alex Hayden; Announcer: Jeff Striegle	Turns 1 & 2: Dave Moody; Turns 3 & 4: Mike Bagley	Winston Kelley; Steve Post

== Standings after the race ==
Drivers' Championship standings

	Pos	Driver	Points
	1	Kevin Harvick	4,115
	2	Denny Hamlin	4,094 (–21)
	3	Brad Keselowski	4,082 (–33)
	4	Chase Elliott	4,074 (–41)
	5	Joey Logano	4,064 (–51)
1	6	Alex Bowman	4,055 (–60)
1	7	Martin Truex Jr.	4,051 (–64)
	8	Kurt Busch	4,009 (–106)
	9	Kyle Busch	2,220 (–1,895)
	10	Austin Dillon	2,212 (–1,903)
	11	Ryan Blaney	2,205 (–1,910)
	12	William Byron	2,184 (–1,931)
1	13	Aric Almirola	2,167 (–1,948)
1	14	Clint Bowyer	2,166 (–1,949)
	15	Matt DiBenedetto	2,160 (–1,955)
	16	Cole Custer	2,146 (–1,969)
Official driver's standings

Manufacturers' Championship standings

Pos	Manufacturer	Points
1	Ford	1,226
2	Toyota	1,157 (–69)
3	Chevrolet	1,120 (–106)

- Note: Only the first 16 positions are included for the driver standings.

Previous race: 2020 Bank of America Roval 400	NASCAR Cup Series; 2020 season	Next race: 2020 Autotrader EchoPark Automotive 500
