= 2021 South Point 400 =

NASCAR Cup Series race

Race details
- Race 30 of 36 in the 2021 NASCAR Cup Series
- Date: September 26, 2021
- Location: Las Vegas Motor Speedway in Las Vegas
- Course: Permanent racing facility
- Course length: 1.5 miles (2.4 km)
- Distance: 267 laps, 400.5 mi (640.8 km)
- Average speed: 144.643 miles per hour (232.780 km/h)
- Attendance: 43,000

Pole position
Driver	Kyle Larson	Hendrick Motorsports
- Grid positions set by competition-based formula

Most laps led
Driver	Denny Hamlin	Joe Gibbs Racing
- Laps: 137

Winner
No. 11	Denny Hamlin	Joe Gibbs Racing

Television in the United States
- Network: NBCSN
- Announcers: Rick Allen, Jeff Burton, Steve Letarte and Dale Earnhardt Jr.

Radio in the United States
- Radio: PRN
- Booth announcers: Doug Rice and Mark Garrow
- Turn announcers: Rob Albright (1 & 2) and Pat Patterson (3 & 4)

The 2021 South Point 400 was a NASCAR Cup Series race held on September 26, 2021, at Las Vegas Motor Speedway in Las Vegas. Contested over 267 laps on the 1.5 mi (2.4 km) asphalt intermediate speedway, it was the 30th race of the 2021 NASCAR Cup Series season, the fourth race of the Playoffs, and the first race of the Round of 12.

== Report ==
=== Background ===
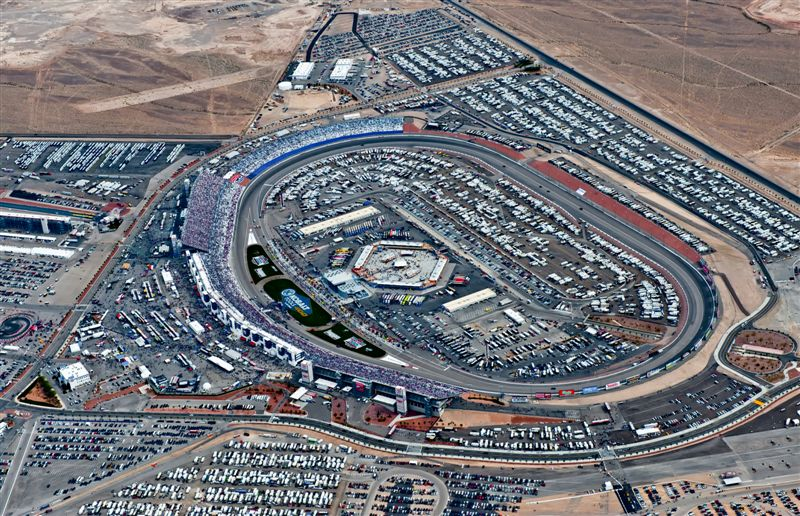
Las Vegas Motor Speedway, the track where the race was held.

The 2021 South Point 400 program cover.

Las Vegas Motor Speedway, located in Clark County, Nevada outside the Las Vegas city limits and about 15 miles northeast of the Las Vegas Strip, is a 1,200-acre (490 ha) complex of multiple tracks for motorsports racing. The complex is owned by Speedway Motorsports, Inc., which is headquartered in Charlotte, North Carolina.

==== Entry list ====
- (R) denotes rookie driver.
- (i) denotes driver who are ineligible for series driver points.

No.	Driver	Team	Manufacturer
00	Quin Houff	StarCom Racing	Chevrolet
1	Kurt Busch	Chip Ganassi Racing	Chevrolet
2	Brad Keselowski	Team Penske	Ford
3	Austin Dillon	Richard Childress Racing	Chevrolet
4	Kevin Harvick	Stewart-Haas Racing	Ford
5	Kyle Larson	Hendrick Motorsports	Chevrolet
6	Ryan Newman	Roush Fenway Racing	Ford
7	Corey LaJoie	Spire Motorsports	Chevrolet
8	Tyler Reddick	Richard Childress Racing	Chevrolet
9	Chase Elliott	Hendrick Motorsports	Chevrolet
10	Aric Almirola	Stewart-Haas Racing	Ford
11	Denny Hamlin	Joe Gibbs Racing	Toyota
12	Ryan Blaney	Team Penske	Ford
14	Chase Briscoe (R)	Stewart-Haas Racing	Ford
15	Joey Gase (i)	Rick Ware Racing	Chevrolet
17	Chris Buescher	Roush Fenway Racing	Ford
18	Kyle Busch	Joe Gibbs Racing	Toyota
19	Martin Truex Jr.	Joe Gibbs Racing	Toyota
20	Christopher Bell	Joe Gibbs Racing	Toyota
21	Matt DiBenedetto	Wood Brothers Racing	Ford
22	Joey Logano	Team Penske	Ford
23	Bubba Wallace	23XI Racing	Toyota
24	William Byron	Hendrick Motorsports	Chevrolet
34	Michael McDowell	Front Row Motorsports	Ford
37	Ryan Preece	JTG Daugherty Racing	Chevrolet
38	Anthony Alfredo (R)	Front Row Motorsports	Ford
41	Cole Custer	Stewart-Haas Racing	Ford
42	Ross Chastain	Chip Ganassi Racing	Chevrolet
43	Erik Jones	Richard Petty Motorsports	Chevrolet
47	Ricky Stenhouse Jr.	JTG Daugherty Racing	Chevrolet
48	Alex Bowman	Hendrick Motorsports	Chevrolet
51	Cody Ware (i)	Petty Ware Racing	Chevrolet
52	Josh Bilicki	Rick Ware Racing	Ford
53	Garrett Smithley (i)	Rick Ware Racing	Chevrolet
66	J. J. Yeley (i)	MBM Motorsports	Toyota
77	Justin Haley (i)	Spire Motorsports	Chevrolet
78	B. J. McLeod (i)	Live Fast Motorsports	Ford
99	Daniel Suárez	Trackhouse Racing Team	Chevrolet
Official entry list

== Qualifying ==
Kyle Larson was awarded the pole for the race as determined by competition-based formula.

=== Starting Lineup ===
Pos	No.	Driver	Team	Manufacturer
1	5	Kyle Larson	Hendrick Motorsports	Chevrolet
2	12	Ryan Blaney	Team Penske	Ford
3	24	William Byron	Hendrick Motorsports	Chevrolet
4	19	Martin Truex Jr.	Joe Gibbs Racing	Toyota
5	4	Kevin Harvick	Stewart-Haas Racing	Ford
6	11	Denny Hamlin	Joe Gibbs Racing	Toyota
7	48	Alex Bowman	Hendrick Motorsports	Chevrolet
8	2	Brad Keselowski	Team Penske	Ford
9	22	Joey Logano	Team Penske	Ford
10	18	Kyle Busch	Joe Gibbs Racing	Toyota
11	9	Chase Elliott	Hendrick Motorsports	Chevrolet
12	20	Christopher Bell	Joe Gibbs Racing	Toyota
13	8	Tyler Reddick	Richard Childress Racing	Chevrolet
14	21	Matt DiBenedetto	Wood Brothers Racing	Ford
15	3	Austin Dillon	Richard Childress Racing	Chevrolet
16	43	Erik Jones	Richard Petty Motorsports	Chevrolet
17	10	Aric Almirola	Stewart-Haas Racing	Ford
18	42	Ross Chastain	Chip Ganassi Racing	Chevrolet
19	14	Chase Briscoe (R)	Stewart-Haas Racing	Ford
20	1	Kurt Busch	Chip Ganassi Racing	Chevrolet
21	23	Bubba Wallace	23XI Racing	Toyota
22	47	Ricky Stenhouse Jr.	JTG Daugherty Racing	Chevrolet
23	34	Michael McDowell	Front Row Motorsports	Ford
24	37	Ryan Preece	JTG Daugherty Racing	Chevrolet
25	17	Chris Buescher	Roush Fenway Racing	Ford
26	99	Daniel Suárez	Trackhouse Racing Team	Chevrolet
27	7	Corey LaJoie	Spire Motorsports	Chevrolet
28	41	Cole Custer	Stewart-Haas Racing	Ford
29	6	Ryan Newman	Roush Fenway Racing	Ford
30	53	Garrett Smithley (i)	Rick Ware Racing	Chevrolet
31	52	Josh Bilicki	Rick Ware Racing	Ford
32	38	Anthony Alfredo (R)	Front Row Motorsports	Ford
33	77	Justin Haley (i)	Spire Motorsports	Chevrolet
34	78	B. J. McLeod (i)	Live Fast Motorsports	Ford
35	51	Cody Ware (i)	Petty Ware Racing	Chevrolet
36	00	Quin Houff	StarCom Racing	Chevrolet
37	15	Joey Gase (i)	Rick Ware Racing	Chevrolet
38	66	J. J. Yeley (i)	MBM Motorsports	Toyota
Official starting lineup

== Race ==
=== Stage Results ===
Stage One Laps: 80

Pos	No	Driver	Team	Manufacturer	Points
1	5	Kyle Larson	Hendrick Motorsports	Chevrolet	10
2	18	Kyle Busch	Joe Gibbs Racing	Toyota	9
3	11	Denny Hamlin	Joe Gibbs Racing	Toyota	8
4	12	Ryan Blaney	Team Penske	Ford	7
5	24	William Byron	Hendrick Motorsports	Chevrolet	6
6	9	Chase Elliott	Hendrick Motorsports	Chevrolet	5
7	8	Tyler Reddick	Richard Childress Racing	Chevrolet	4
8	4	Kevin Harvick	Stewart-Haas Racing	Ford	3
9	21	Matt DiBenedetto	Wood Brothers Racing	Ford	2
10	19	Martin Truex Jr.	Joe Gibbs Racing	Toyota	1
Official stage one results

Stage Two Laps: 80

Pos	No	Driver	Team	Manufacturer	Points
1	11	Denny Hamlin	Joe Gibbs Racing	Toyota	10
2	18	Kyle Busch	Joe Gibbs Racing	Toyota	9
3	8	Tyler Reddick	Richard Childress Racing	Chevrolet	8
4	19	Martin Truex Jr.	Joe Gibbs Racing	Toyota	7
5	22	Joey Logano	Team Penske	Ford	6
6	2	Brad Keselowski	Team Penske	Ford	5
7	1	Kurt Busch	Chip Ganassi Racing	Chevrolet	4
8	4	Kevin Harvick	Stewart-Haas Racing	Ford	3
9	3	Austin Dillon	Richard Childress Racing	Chevrolet	2
10	23	Bubba Wallace	23XI Racing	Toyota	1
Official stage two results

=== Final Stage Results ===
Stage Three Laps: 107

Pos	Grid	No	Driver	Team	Manufacturer	Laps	Points
1	6	11	Denny Hamlin	Joe Gibbs Racing	Toyota	267	58
2	11	9	Chase Elliott	Hendrick Motorsports	Chevrolet	267	40
3	10	18	Kyle Busch	Joe Gibbs Racing	Toyota	267	52
4	4	19	Martin Truex Jr.	Joe Gibbs Racing	Toyota	267	41
5	2	12	Ryan Blaney	Team Penske	Ford	267	39
6	13	8	Tyler Reddick	Richard Childress Racing	Chevrolet	267	43
7	8	2	Brad Keselowski	Team Penske	Ford	267	35
8	20	1	Kurt Busch	Chip Ganassi Racing	Chevrolet	267	33
9	5	4	Kevin Harvick	Stewart-Haas Racing	Ford	267	34
10	1	5	Kyle Larson	Hendrick Motorsports	Chevrolet	267	37
11	9	22	Joey Logano	Team Penske	Ford	267	32
12	14	21	Matt DiBenedetto	Wood Brothers Racing	Ford	267	27
13	15	3	Austin Dillon	Richard Childress Racing	Chevrolet	266	26
14	19	14	Chase Briscoe (R)	Stewart-Haas Racing	Ford	266	23
15	26	99	Daniel Suárez	Trackhouse Racing Team	Chevrolet	266	22
16	21	23	Bubba Wallace	23XI Racing	Toyota	266	22
17	22	47	Ricky Stenhouse Jr.	JTG Daugherty Racing	Chevrolet	266	20
18	3	24	William Byron	Hendrick Motorsports	Chevrolet	266	25
19	17	10	Aric Almirola	Stewart-Haas Racing	Ford	266	18
20	29	6	Ryan Newman	Roush Fenway Racing	Ford	266	17
21	23	34	Michael McDowell	Front Row Motorsports	Ford	266	16
22	7	48	Alex Bowman	Hendrick Motorsports	Chevrolet	265	15
23	18	42	Ross Chastain	Chip Ganassi Racing	Chevrolet	265	14
24	12	20	Christopher Bell	Joe Gibbs Racing	Toyota	265	13
25	25	17	Chris Buescher	Roush Fenway Racing	Ford	265	12
26	16	43	Erik Jones	Richard Petty Motorsports	Chevrolet	265	11
27	32	38	Anthony Alfredo (R)	Front Row Motorsports	Ford	265	10
28	24	37	Ryan Preece	JTG Daugherty Racing	Chevrolet	265	9
29	28	41	Cole Custer	Stewart-Haas Racing	Ford	265	8
30	27	7	Corey LaJoie	Spire Motorsports	Chevrolet	264	7
31	35	51	Cody Ware (i)	Petty Ware Racing	Chevrolet	260	0
32	33	77	Justin Haley (i)	Spire Motorsports	Chevrolet	260	0
33	34	78	B. J. McLeod (i)	Live Fast Motorsports	Ford	257	0
34	36	00	Quin Houff	StarCom Racing	Chevrolet	255	3
35	30	53	Garrett Smithley (i)	Rick Ware Racing	Chevrolet	254	0
36	31	52	Josh Bilicki	Rick Ware Racing	Ford	252	1
37	37	15	Joey Gase (i)	Rick Ware Racing	Chevrolet	84	0
38	38	66	J. J. Yeley (i)	MBM Motorsports	Toyota	76	0
Official race results

=== Race statistics ===
- Lead changes: 21 among 10 different drivers
- Cautions/Laps: 4 for 21
- Red flags: 0
- Time of race: 2 hours, 46 minutes and 8 seconds
- Average speed: 144.643 miles per hour (232.780 km/h)

== Media ==
=== Television ===
NBC Sports covered the race on the television side. Rick Allen, Jeff Burton, Steve Letarte and Dale Earnhardt Jr. called the race from the broadcast booth. Dave Burns and Kelli Stavast handled the pit road duties from pit lane.

NBCSN
Booth announcers	Pit reporters
Lap-by-lap: Rick Allen; Color-commentator: Jeff Burton; Color-commentator: Steve Letarte; Color-commentator: Dale Earnhardt Jr.	Dave Burns; Kelli Stavast

=== Radio ===
PRN had the radio call for the race, which was also simulcast on Sirius XM NASCAR Radio. Doug Rice and Mark Garrow called the race from the booth when the field raced through the tri-oval. Rob Albright called the race from a billboard in turn 2 when the field raced through turns 1 and 2 & Pat Patterson called the race from a billboard outside of turn 3 when the field raced through turns 3 and 4. Brad Gillie, Brett McMillan and Wendy Venturini handled the duties on pit lane.

PRN
Booth announcers	Turn announcers	Pit reporters
Lead announcer: Doug Rice; Announcer: Mark Garrow	Turns 1 & 2: Rob Albright; Turns 3 & 4: Pat Patterson	Brad Gillie; Brett McMillan; Wendy Venturini

== Standings after the race ==
Drivers' Championship standings

	Pos	Driver	Points
	1	Kyle Larson	3,096
1	2	Denny Hamlin	3,082 (–14)
2	3	Kyle Busch	3,074 (–22)
2	4	Martin Truex Jr.	3,070 (–26)
1	5	Ryan Blaney	3,063 (–33)
	6	Chase Elliott	3,061 (–35)
2	7	Joey Logano	3,045 (–51)
2	8	Brad Keselowski	3,043 (–53)
1	9	William Byron	3,039 (–57)
2	10	Kevin Harvick	3,036 (–60)
4	11	Alex Bowman	3,030 (–66)
1	12	Christopher Bell	3,018 (–78)
1	13	Tyler Reddick	2,118 (–978)
1	14	Kurt Busch	2,104 (–992)
2	15	Aric Almirola	2,093 (–1,003)
	16	Michael McDowell	2,044 (–1,052)
Official driver's standings

Manufacturers' Championship standings

Pos	Manufacturer	Points
1	Chevrolet	1,103
2	Ford	1,033 (–70)
3	Toyota	1,030 (–73)

- Note: Only the first 16 positions are included for the driver standings.

Previous race: 2021 Bass Pro Shops NRA Night Race	NASCAR Cup Series; 2021 season	Next race: 2021 YellaWood 500
