= 2021 Pennzoil 400 =

NASCAR Cup Series race

Race details
- Race 4 of 36 in the 2021 NASCAR Cup Series
- Date: March 7, 2021
- Location: Las Vegas Motor Speedway in Las Vegas
- Course: Permanent racing facility
- Course length: 1.5 miles (2.4 km)
- Distance: 267 laps, 400.5 mi (640.8 km)
- Average speed: 139.615 miles per hour (224.689 km/h)

Pole position
Driver	Kevin Harvick	Stewart-Haas Racing
- Grid positions set by competition-based formula

Most laps led
Driver	Kyle Larson	Hendrick Motorsports
- Laps: 103

Winner
No. 5	Kyle Larson	Hendrick Motorsports

Television in the United States
- Network: Fox
- Announcers: Mike Joy, Jeff Gordon and Clint Bowyer
- Nielsen ratings: 4.358 million

Radio in the United States
- Radio: PRN
- Booth announcers: Doug Rice and Mark Garrow
- Turn announcers: Rob Albright (1 & 2) and Pat Patterson (3 & 4)

The 2021 Pennzoil 400 presented by Jiffy Lube was a NASCAR Cup Series race held on March 7, 2021 at Las Vegas Motor Speedway in Las Vegas. Contested over 267 laps on the 1.5 mi (2.4 km) asphalt intermediate speedway, it was the fourth race of the 2021 NASCAR Cup Series season.

== Report ==
=== Background ===
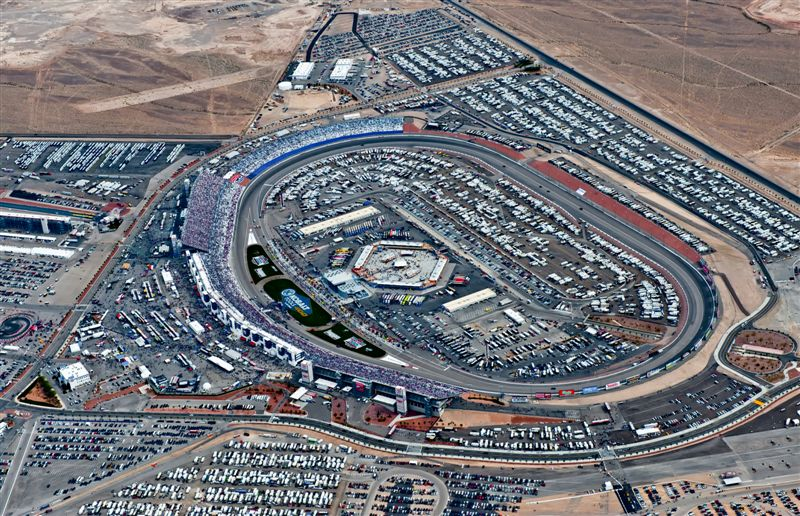
Las Vegas Motor Speedway, the track where the race was held.

Las Vegas Motor Speedway, located in Clark County, Nevada outside the Las Vegas city limits and about 15 miles northeast of the Las Vegas Strip, is a 1,200-acre (490 ha) complex of multiple tracks for motorsports racing. The complex is owned by Speedway Motorsports, Inc., which is headquartered in Charlotte, North Carolina.

==== Entry list ====
- (R) denotes rookie driver.
- (i) denotes driver who are ineligible for series driver points.

No.	Driver	Team	Manufacturer
00	Quin Houff	StarCom Racing	Chevrolet
1	Kurt Busch	Chip Ganassi Racing	Chevrolet
2	Brad Keselowski	Team Penske	Ford
3	Austin Dillon	Richard Childress Racing	Chevrolet
4	Kevin Harvick	Stewart-Haas Racing	Ford
5	Kyle Larson	Hendrick Motorsports	Chevrolet
6	Ryan Newman	Roush Fenway Racing	Ford
7	Corey LaJoie	Spire Motorsports	Chevrolet
8	Tyler Reddick	Richard Childress Racing	Chevrolet
9	Chase Elliott	Hendrick Motorsports	Chevrolet
10	Aric Almirola	Stewart-Haas Racing	Ford
11	Denny Hamlin	Joe Gibbs Racing	Toyota
12	Ryan Blaney	Team Penske	Ford
14	Chase Briscoe (R)	Stewart-Haas Racing	Ford
15	Joey Gase	Rick Ware Racing	Chevrolet
17	Chris Buescher	Roush Fenway Racing	Ford
18	Kyle Busch	Joe Gibbs Racing	Toyota
19	Martin Truex Jr.	Joe Gibbs Racing	Toyota
20	Christopher Bell	Joe Gibbs Racing	Toyota
21	Matt DiBenedetto	Wood Brothers Racing	Ford
22	Joey Logano	Team Penske	Ford
23	Bubba Wallace	23XI Racing	Toyota
24	William Byron	Hendrick Motorsports	Chevrolet
34	Michael McDowell	Front Row Motorsports	Ford
37	Ryan Preece	JTG Daugherty Racing	Chevrolet
38	Anthony Alfredo (R)	Front Row Motorsports	Ford
41	Cole Custer	Stewart-Haas Racing	Ford
42	Ross Chastain	Chip Ganassi Racing	Chevrolet
43	Erik Jones	Richard Petty Motorsports	Chevrolet
47	Ricky Stenhouse Jr.	JTG Daugherty Racing	Chevrolet
48	Alex Bowman	Hendrick Motorsports	Chevrolet
51	Cody Ware (i)	Petty Ware Racing	Chevrolet
52	Josh Bilicki	Rick Ware Racing	Ford
53	Garrett Smithley (i)	Rick Ware Racing	Chevrolet
66	Timmy Hill (i)	MBM Motorsports	Toyota
77	Justin Haley (i)	Spire Motorsports	Chevrolet
78	B. J. McLeod (i)	Live Fast Motorsports	Ford
99	Daniel Suárez	Trackhouse Racing Team	Chevrolet
Official entry list

== Qualifying ==
Kevin Harvick was awarded the pole for the race as determined by competition-based formula.

=== Starting Lineup ===
Pos	No.	Driver	Team	Manufacturer
1	4	Kevin Harvick	Stewart-Haas Racing	Ford
2	24	William Byron	Hendrick Motorsports	Chevrolet
3	5	Kyle Larson	Hendrick Motorsports	Chevrolet
4	19	Martin Truex Jr.	Joe Gibbs Racing	Toyota
5	34	Michael McDowell	Front Row Motorsports	Ford
6	11	Denny Hamlin	Joe Gibbs Racing	Toyota
7	1	Kurt Busch	Chip Ganassi Racing	Chevrolet
8	9	Chase Elliott	Hendrick Motorsports	Chevrolet
9	48	Alex Bowman	Hendrick Motorsports	Chevrolet
10	2	Brad Keselowski	Team Penske	Ford
11	8	Tyler Reddick	Richard Childress Racing	Chevrolet
12	3	Austin Dillon	Richard Childress Racing	Chevrolet
13	6	Ryan Newman	Roush Fenway Racing	Ford
14	18	Kyle Busch	Joe Gibbs Racing	Toyota
15	22	Joey Logano	Team Penske	Ford
16	20	Christopher Bell	Joe Gibbs Racing	Toyota
17	47	Ricky Stenhouse Jr.	JTG Daugherty Racing	Chevrolet
18	17	Chris Buescher	Roush Fenway Racing	Ford
19	37	Ryan Preece	JTG Daugherty Racing	Chevrolet
20	41	Cole Custer	Stewart-Haas Racing	Ford
21	42	Ross Chastain	Chip Ganassi Racing	Chevrolet
22	99	Daniel Suárez	Trackhouse Racing Team	Chevrolet
23	23	Bubba Wallace	23XI Racing	Toyota
24	14	Chase Briscoe (R)	Stewart-Haas Racing	Ford
25	77	Justin Haley (i)	Spire Motorsports	Chevrolet
26	12	Ryan Blaney	Team Penske	Ford
27	38	Anthony Alfredo (R)	Front Row Motorsports	Ford
28	10	Aric Almirola	Stewart-Haas Racing	Ford
29	43	Erik Jones	Richard Petty Motorsports	Chevrolet
30	21	Matt DiBenedetto	Wood Brothers Racing	Ford
31	53	Garrett Smithley (i)	Rick Ware Racing	Chevrolet
32	51	Cody Ware (i)	Petty Ware Racing	Chevrolet
33	7	Corey LaJoie	Spire Motorsports	Chevrolet
34	78	B. J. McLeod (i)	Live Fast Motorsports	Ford
35	52	Josh Bilicki	Rick Ware Racing	Ford
36	00	Quin Houff	StarCom Racing	Chevrolet
37	15	Joey Gase	Rick Ware Racing	Chevrolet
38	66	Timmy Hill (i)	MBM Motorsports	Toyota
Official starting lineup

== Race ==
Kyle Larson won the race for Hendrick Motorsports, driving the #5 HendrickCars.com Chevrolet. It was his first win since he was sacked by Chip Ganassi Racing in 2020 after he said a racial slur. He also won stage two. Brad Keselowski finished second after winning stage one. Kyle Busch finished third after he passed Denny Hamlin, who was followed by Ryan Blaney.

=== Stage Results ===
Stage One Laps: 80

Pos	No	Driver	Team	Manufacturer	Points
1	2	Brad Keselowski	Team Penske	Ford	10
2	9	Chase Elliott	Hendrick Motorsports	Chevrolet	9
3	12	Ryan Blaney	Team Penske	Ford	8
4	11	Denny Hamlin	Joe Gibbs Racing	Toyota	7
5	48	Alex Bowman	Hendrick Motorsports	Chevrolet	6
6	20	Christopher Bell	Joe Gibbs Racing	Toyota	5
7	24	William Byron	Hendrick Motorsports	Chevrolet	4
8	21	Matt DiBenedetto	Wood Brothers Racing	Ford	3
9	22	Joey Logano	Team Penske	Ford	2
10	19	Martin Truex Jr.	Joe Gibbs Racing	Toyota	1
Official stage one results

Stage Two Laps: 80

Pos	No	Driver	Team	Manufacturer	Points
1	5	Kyle Larson	Hendrick Motorsports	Chevrolet	10
2	2	Brad Keselowski	Team Penske	Ford	9
3	11	Denny Hamlin	Joe Gibbs Racing	Toyota	8
4	24	William Byron	Hendrick Motorsports	Chevrolet	7
5	12	Ryan Blaney	Team Penske	Ford	6
6	48	Alex Bowman	Hendrick Motorsports	Chevrolet	5
7	20	Christopher Bell	Joe Gibbs Racing	Toyota	4
8	19	Martin Truex Jr.	Joe Gibbs Racing	Toyota	3
9	18	Kyle Busch	Joe Gibbs Racing	Toyota	2
10	9	Chase Elliott	Hendrick Motorsports	Chevrolet	1
Official stage two results

=== Final Stage Results ===
Stage Three Laps: 107

Pos	Grid	No	Driver	Team	Manufacturer	Laps	Points
1	3	5	Kyle Larson	Hendrick Motorsports	Chevrolet	267	50
2	10	2	Brad Keselowski	Team Penske	Ford	267	54
3	14	18	Kyle Busch	Joe Gibbs Racing	Toyota	267	36
4	6	11	Denny Hamlin	Joe Gibbs Racing	Toyota	267	48
5	26	12	Ryan Blaney	Team Penske	Ford	267	46
6	4	19	Martin Truex Jr.	Joe Gibbs Racing	Toyota	267	35
7	16	20	Christopher Bell	Joe Gibbs Racing	Toyota	267	39
8	2	24	William Byron	Hendrick Motorsports	Chevrolet	267	40
9	15	22	Joey Logano	Team Penske	Ford	267	30
10	29	43	Erik Jones	Richard Petty Motorsports	Chevrolet	267	27
11	17	47	Ricky Stenhouse Jr.	JTG Daugherty Racing	Chevrolet	267	26
12	12	3	Austin Dillon	Richard Childress Racing	Chevrolet	267	25
13	8	9	Chase Elliott	Hendrick Motorsports	Chevrolet	267	34
14	18	17	Chris Buescher	Roush Fenway Racing	Ford	267	23
15	19	37	Ryan Preece	JTG Daugherty Racing	Chevrolet	266	22
16	30	21	Matt DiBenedetto	Wood Brothers Racing	Ford	266	24
17	5	34	Michael McDowell	Front Row Motorsports	Ford	266	20
18	13	6	Ryan Newman	Roush Fenway Racing	Ford	266	19
19	7	1	Kurt Busch	Chip Ganassi Racing	Chevrolet	266	18
20	1	4	Kevin Harvick	Stewart-Haas Racing	Ford	266	17
21	24	14	Chase Briscoe (R)	Stewart-Haas Racing	Ford	266	16
22	11	8	Tyler Reddick	Richard Childress Racing	Chevrolet	266	15
23	21	42	Ross Chastain	Chip Ganassi Racing	Chevrolet	266	14
24	27	38	Anthony Alfredo (R)	Front Row Motorsports	Ford	266	13
25	20	41	Cole Custer	Stewart-Haas Racing	Ford	266	12
26	22	99	Daniel Suárez	Trackhouse Racing Team	Chevrolet	265	11
27	9	48	Alex Bowman	Hendrick Motorsports	Chevrolet	265	21
28	23	23	Bubba Wallace	23XI Racing	Toyota	262	9
29	25	77	Justin Haley (i)	Spire Motorsports	Chevrolet	262	0
30	34	78	B. J. McLeod (i)	Live Fast Motorsports	Ford	260	0
31	31	53	Garrett Smithley (i)	Rick Ware Racing	Chevrolet	259	0
32	32	51	Cody Ware (i)	Petty Ware Racing	Chevrolet	259	0
33	36	00	Quin Houff	StarCom Racing	Chevrolet	256	4
34	37	15	Joey Gase	Rick Ware Racing	Chevrolet	255	3
35	35	52	Josh Bilicki	Rick Ware Racing	Ford	252	2
36	38	66	Timmy Hill (i)	MBM Motorsports	Toyota	246	0
37	33	7	Corey LaJoie	Spire Motorsports	Chevrolet	188	1
38	28	10	Aric Almirola	Stewart-Haas Racing	Ford	178	1
Official race results

=== Race statistics ===
- Lead changes: 27 among 12 different drivers
- Cautions/Laps: 6 for 30
- Red flags: 0
- Time of race: 2 hours, 52 minutes and 7 seconds
- Average speed: 139.615 miles per hour (224.689 km/h)

== Media ==
=== Television ===
Fox Sports covered their 21st race at the Las Vegas Motor Speedway. Mike Joy, 2001 race winner Jeff Gordon and Clint Bowyer called the race from the broadcast booth. Jamie Little and Regan Smith handled pit road for the television side. Larry McReynolds provided insight from the Fox Sports studio in Charlotte.

Fox
Booth announcers	Pit reporters	In-race analyst
Lap-by-lap: Mike Joy; Color-commentator: Jeff Gordon; Color-commentator: Clint Bowyer	Jamie Little; Regan Smith	Larry McReynolds

=== Radio ===
PRN covered the radio call for the race which was also simulcasted on Sirius XM NASCAR Radio. Doug Rice and Mark Garrow called the race in the booth where the field raced through the tri-oval. Rob Albright called the race from a billboard in turn 2 where the field raced through turns 1 and 2. Pat Patterson called the race from a billboard outside of turn 3 where the field raced through turns 3 and 4. Brad Gillie, Brett McMillan and Wendy Venturini worked pit road for the radio side.

PRN
Booth announcers	Turn announcers	Pit reporters
Lead announcer: Doug Rice; Announcer: Mark Garrow	Turns 1 & 2: Rob Albright; Turns 3 & 4: Pat Patterson	Brad Gillie; Brett McMillan; Wendy Venturini

== Standings after the race ==
Drivers' Championship standings

	Pos	Driver	Points
	1	Denny Hamlin	187
8	2	Brad Keselowski	149 (–38)
5	3	Kyle Larson	147 (–40)
1	4	Chase Elliott	139 (–48)
2	5	Christopher Bell	138 (–49)
3	6	Joey Logano	138 (–49)
5	7	Kevin Harvick	136 (–51)
1	8	Martin Truex Jr.	131 (–56)
5	9	Michael McDowell	126 (–61)
4	10	Kurt Busch	122 (–65)
2	11	William Byron	116 (–71)
1	12	Austin Dillon	115 (–72)
1	13	Ryan Preece	112 (–75)
4	14	Kyle Busch	98 (–89)
9	15	Ryan Blaney	91 (–96)
1	16	Chris Buescher	90 (–97)
Official driver's standings

Manufacturers' Championship standings

Pos	Manufacturer	Points
1	Chevrolet	148
2	Ford	142 (–6)
3	Toyota	140 (–8)

- Note: Only the first 16 positions are included for the driver standings.

Previous race: 2021 Dixie Vodka 400	NASCAR Cup Series; 2021 season	Next race: 2021 Instacart 500
