= 2019 Go Bowling at The Glen =

Race details
- Race 22 of 36 in the 2019 Monster Energy NASCAR Cup Series
- 2019 Go Bowling at the Glen program cover, featuring Chase Elliott, winner of the 2018 race.
- Date: August 4, 2019
- Location: Watkins Glen International in Watkins Glen, New York
- Course: Permanent racing facility
- Course length: 2.45 miles (3.94 km)
- Distance: 90 laps, 220.5 mi (354.6 km)
- Average speed: 98.523 miles per hour (158.557 km/h)

Pole position
Driver	Chase Elliott	Hendrick Motorsports
- Time: 69.287

Most laps led
Driver	Chase Elliott	Hendrick Motorsports
- Laps: 80

Winner
No. 9	Chase Elliott	Hendrick Motorsports

Television in the United States
- Network: NBCSN
- Announcers: Rick Allen, Steve Letarte (booth), Mike Bagley (Esses), Dale Earnhardt Jr. (Turn 5) and Jeff Burton (Turns 6-7)
- Nielsen ratings: 2.722 million

Radio in the United States
- Radio: MRN
- Booth announcers: Alex Hayden, Jeff Striegle and Rusty Wallace
- Turn announcers: Dave Moody (Esses), Kurt Becker (Turn 5) and Kyle Rickey (Turns 10-11)

The layout of Watkins Glen International, where the race was held.

The 2019 Go Bowling at The Glen was a Monster Energy NASCAR Cup Series race held on August 4, 2019 at Watkins Glen International in Watkins Glen, New York. Contested over 90 laps on the 2.45-mile (3.94 km) road course, it was the 22nd race of the 2019 Monster Energy NASCAR Cup Series season.

== Report ==
=== Background ===
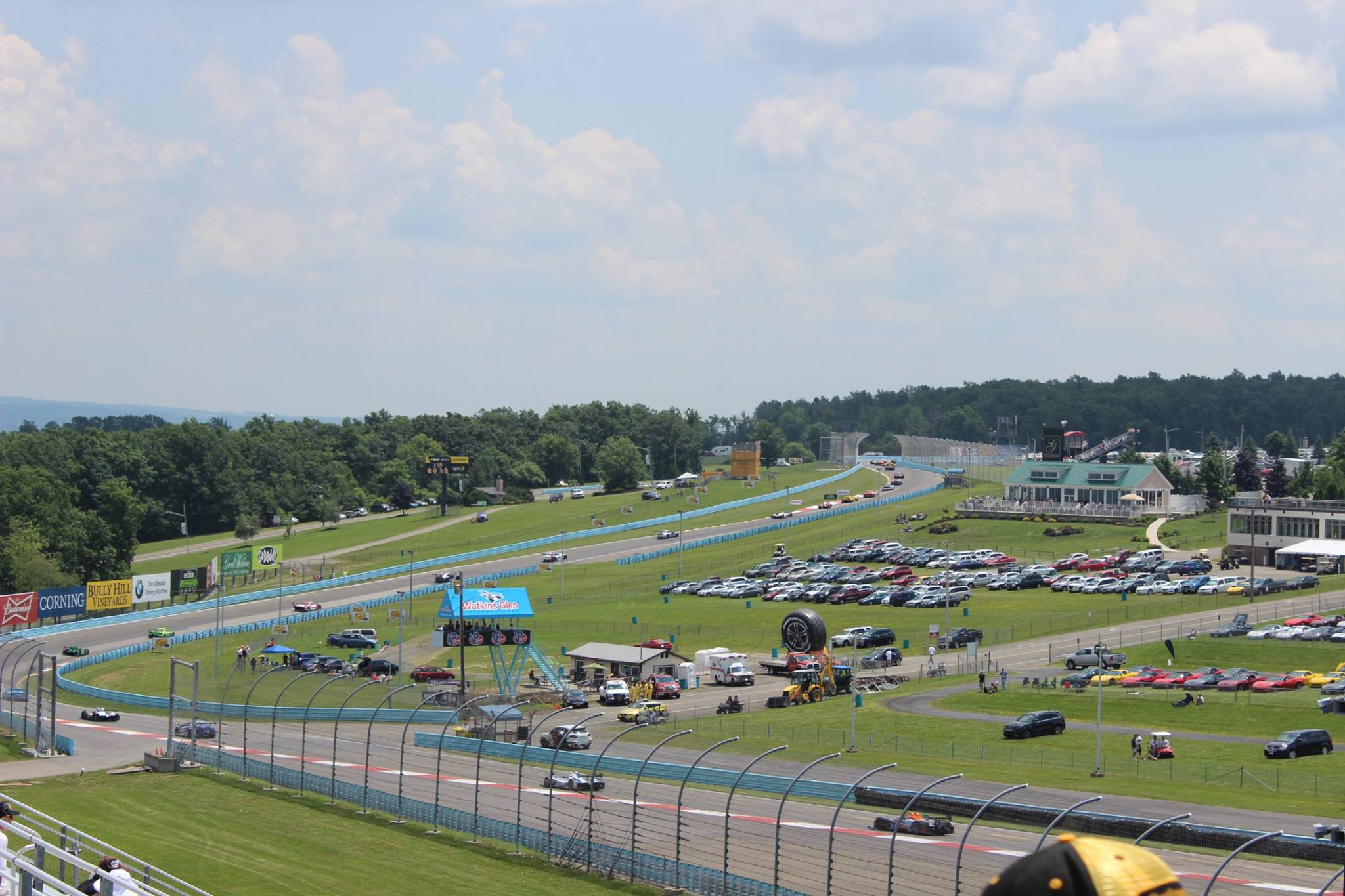
Watkins Glen International

Watkins Glen International (nicknamed "The Glen") is an automobile race track located in Watkins Glen, New York at the southern tip of Seneca Lake. It was long known around the world as the home of the Formula One United States Grand Prix, which it hosted for twenty consecutive years (1961–1980), but the site has been home to road racing of nearly every class, including the World Sportscar Championship, Trans-Am, Can-Am, NASCAR Sprint Cup Series, the International Motor Sports Association and the IndyCar Series.

Initially, public roads in the village were used for the race course. In 1956 a permanent circuit for the race was built. In 1968 the race was extended to six hours, becoming the 6 Hours of Watkins Glen. The circuit's current layout has more or less been the same since 1971, although a chicane was installed at the uphill Esses in 1975 to slow cars through these corners, where there was a fatality during practice at the 1973 United States Grand Prix. The chicane was removed in 1985, but another chicane called the "Inner Loop" was installed in 1992 after J.D. McDuffie's fatal accident during the previous year's NASCAR Winston Cup event.

The circuit is known as the Mecca of North American road racing and is a very popular venue among fans and drivers. The facility is currently owned by International Speedway Corporation.

==== Entry list ====
- (i) denotes driver who are ineligible for series driver points.
- (R) denotes rookie driver.

No.	Driver	Team	Manufacturer
00	Landon Cassill (i)	StarCom Racing	Chevrolet
1	Kurt Busch	Chip Ganassi Racing	Chevrolet
2	Brad Keselowski	Team Penske	Ford
3	Austin Dillon	Richard Childress Racing	Chevrolet
4	Kevin Harvick	Stewart-Haas Racing	Ford
6	Ryan Newman	Roush Fenway Racing	Ford
8	Daniel Hemric (R)	Richard Childress Racing	Chevrolet
9	Chase Elliott	Hendrick Motorsports	Chevrolet
10	Aric Almirola	Stewart-Haas Racing	Ford
11	Denny Hamlin	Joe Gibbs Racing	Toyota
12	Ryan Blaney	Team Penske	Ford
13	Ty Dillon	Germain Racing	Chevrolet
14	Clint Bowyer	Stewart-Haas Racing	Ford
15	Ross Chastain (i)	Premium Motorsports	Chevrolet
17	Ricky Stenhouse Jr.	Roush Fenway Racing	Ford
18	Kyle Busch	Joe Gibbs Racing	Toyota
19	Martin Truex Jr.	Joe Gibbs Racing	Toyota
20	Erik Jones	Joe Gibbs Racing	Toyota
21	Paul Menard	Wood Brothers Racing	Ford
22	Joey Logano	Team Penske	Ford
24	William Byron	Hendrick Motorsports	Chevrolet
32	Corey LaJoie	Go Fas Racing	Ford
34	Michael McDowell	Front Row Motorsports	Ford
36	Matt Tifft (R)	Front Row Motorsports	Ford
37	Chris Buescher	JTG Daugherty Racing	Chevrolet
38	David Ragan	Front Row Motorsports	Ford
41	Daniel Suárez	Stewart-Haas Racing	Ford
42	Kyle Larson	Chip Ganassi Racing	Chevrolet
43	Bubba Wallace	Richard Petty Motorsports	Chevrolet
47	Ryan Preece (R)	JTG Daugherty Racing	Chevrolet
48	Jimmie Johnson	Hendrick Motorsports	Chevrolet
51	Cody Ware (i)	Petty Ware Racing	Chevrolet
52	Josh Bilicki (i)	Rick Ware Racing	Chevrolet
77	Reed Sorenson	Spire Motorsports	Chevrolet
88	Alex Bowman	Hendrick Motorsports	Chevrolet
95	Matt DiBenedetto	Leavine Family Racing	Toyota
96	Parker Kligerman (i)	Gaunt Brothers Racing	Toyota
Official entry list

== Practice ==
=== First practice ===
Alex Bowman was the fastest in the first practice session with a time of 70.062 seconds and a speed of 125.888 mph (202.597 km/h).

Pos	No.	Driver	Team	Manufacturer	Time	Speed
1	88	Alex Bowman	Hendrick Motorsports	Chevrolet	70.062	125.888
2	18	Kyle Busch	Joe Gibbs Racing	Toyota	70.119	125.786
3	11	Denny Hamlin	Joe Gibbs Racing	Toyota	70.199	125.643
Official first practice results

=== Final practice ===
Chase Elliott was the fastest in the final practice session with a time of 69.503 seconds and a speed of 126.901 mph (204.227 km/h).

Pos	No.	Driver	Team	Manufacturer	Time	Speed
1	9	Chase Elliott	Hendrick Motorsports	Chevrolet	69.503	126.901
2	19	Martin Truex Jr.	Joe Gibbs Racing	Toyota	70.325	125.418
3	95	Matt DiBenedetto	Leavine Family Racing	Toyota	70.340	125.391
Official final practice results

== Qualifying ==
Chase Elliott scored the pole for the race with a time of 69.287 and a speed of 127.297 mph (204.865 km/h).

=== Qualifying results ===
Pos	No.	Driver	Team	Manufacturer	R1	R2
1	9	Chase Elliott	Hendrick Motorsports	Chevrolet	69.602	69.287
2	24	William Byron	Hendrick Motorsports	Chevrolet	69.776	69.370
3	18	Kyle Busch	Joe Gibbs Racing	Toyota	69.679	69.462
4	19	Martin Truex Jr.	Joe Gibbs Racing	Toyota	69.623	69.525
5	42	Kyle Larson	Chip Ganassi Racing	Chevrolet	69.983	69.570
6	11	Denny Hamlin	Joe Gibbs Racing	Toyota	69.750	69.599
7	1	Kurt Busch	Chip Ganassi Racing	Chevrolet	69.892	69.834
8	48	Jimmie Johnson	Hendrick Motorsports	Chevrolet	69.959	69.931
9	10	Aric Almirola	Stewart-Haas Racing	Ford	70.172	70.040
10	2	Brad Keselowski	Team Penske	Ford	69.823	70.041
11	34	Michael McDowell	Front Row Motorsports	Ford	70.087	70.229
12	17	Ricky Stenhouse Jr.	Roush Fenway Racing	Ford	70.140	70.550
13	14	Clint Bowyer	Stewart-Haas Racing	Ford	70.215	—
14	20	Erik Jones	Joe Gibbs Racing	Toyota	70.230	—
15	4	Kevin Harvick	Stewart-Haas Racing	Ford	70.273	—
16	37	Chris Buescher	JTG Daugherty Racing	Chevrolet	70.276	—
17	88	Alex Bowman	Hendrick Motorsports	Chevrolet	70.278	—
18	41	Daniel Suárez	Stewart-Haas Racing	Ford	70.308	—
19	12	Ryan Blaney	Team Penske	Ford	70.340	—
20	95	Matt DiBenedetto	Leavine Family Racing	Toyota	70.352	—
21	22	Joey Logano	Team Penske	Ford	70.374	—
22	21	Paul Menard	Wood Brothers Racing	Ford	70.467	—
23	8	Daniel Hemric (R)	Richard Childress Racing	Chevrolet	70.785	—
24	96	Parker Kligerman (i)	Gaunt Brothers Racing	Toyota	70.811	—
25	6	Ryan Newman	Roush Fenway Racing	Ford	70.858	—
26	36	Matt Tifft (R)	Front Row Motorsports	Ford	70.866	—
27	13	Ty Dillon	Germain Racing	Chevrolet	70.933	—
28	3	Austin Dillon	Richard Childress Racing	Chevrolet	71.065	—
29	47	Ryan Preece (R)	JTG Daugherty Racing	Chevrolet	71.270	—
30	43	Bubba Wallace	Richard Petty Motorsports	Chevrolet	71.390	—
31	38	David Ragan	Front Row Motorsports	Ford	71.557	—
32	15	Ross Chastain (i)	Premium Motorsports	Chevrolet	71.772	—
33	32	Corey LaJoie	Go Fas Racing	Ford	71.868	—
34	00	Landon Cassill (i)	StarCom Racing	Chevrolet	72.364	—
35	51	Cody Ware (i)	Petty Ware Racing	Chevrolet	73.234	—
36	52	Josh Bilicki (i)	Rick Ware Racing	Chevrolet	73.266	—
37	77	Reed Sorenson	Spire Motorsports	Chevrolet	76.271	—
Official qualifying results

== Race ==
=== Stage results ===
Stage One Laps: 20

Pos	No	Driver	Team	Manufacturer	Points
1	9	Chase Elliott	Hendrick Motorsports	Chevrolet	10
2	11	Denny Hamlin	Joe Gibbs Racing	Toyota	9
3	19	Martin Truex Jr.	Joe Gibbs Racing	Toyota	8
4	18	Kyle Busch	Joe Gibbs Racing	Toyota	7
5	24	William Byron	Hendrick Motorsports	Chevrolet	6
6	48	Jimmie Johnson	Hendrick Motorsports	Chevrolet	5
7	42	Kyle Larson	Chip Ganassi Racing	Chevrolet	4
8	20	Erik Jones	Joe Gibbs Racing	Toyota	3
9	1	Kurt Busch	Chip Ganassi Racing	Chevrolet	2
10	10	Aric Almirola	Stewart-Haas Racing	Ford	1
Official stage one results

Stage Two Laps: 20

Pos	No	Driver	Team	Manufacturer	Points
1	9	Chase Elliott	Hendrick Motorsports	Chevrolet	10
2	19	Martin Truex Jr.	Joe Gibbs Racing	Toyota	9
3	4	Kevin Harvick	Stewart-Haas Racing	Ford	8
4	14	Clint Bowyer	Stewart-Haas Racing	Ford	7
5	11	Denny Hamlin	Joe Gibbs Racing	Toyota	6
6	2	Brad Keselowski	Team Penske	Ford	5
7	88	Alex Bowman	Hendrick Motorsports	Chevrolet	4
8	20	Erik Jones	Joe Gibbs Racing	Toyota	3
9	12	Ryan Blaney	Team Penske	Ford	2
10	48	Jimmie Johnson	Hendrick Motorsports	Chevrolet	1
Official stage two results

=== Final stage results ===
Stage Three Laps: 50

Pos	Grid	No	Driver	Team	Manufacturer	Laps	Points
1	1	9	Chase Elliott	Hendrick Motorsports	Chevrolet	90	60
2	4	19	Martin Truex Jr.	Joe Gibbs Racing	Toyota	90	52
3	6	11	Denny Hamlin	Joe Gibbs Racing	Toyota	90	49
4	14	20	Erik Jones	Joe Gibbs Racing	Toyota	90	39
5	19	12	Ryan Blaney	Team Penske	Ford	90	34
6	20	95	Matt DiBenedetto	Leavine Family Racing	Toyota	90	31
7	15	4	Kevin Harvick	Stewart-Haas Racing	Ford	90	38
8	5	42	Kyle Larson	Chip Ganassi Racing	Chevrolet	90	33
9	10	2	Brad Keselowski	Team Penske	Ford	90	33
10	7	1	Kurt Busch	Chip Ganassi Racing	Chevrolet	90	29
11	3	18	Kyle Busch	Joe Gibbs Racing	Toyota	90	33
12	9	10	Aric Almirola	Stewart-Haas Racing	Ford	90	26
13	16	37	Chris Buescher	JTG Daugherty Racing	Chevrolet	90	24
14	17	88	Alex Bowman	Hendrick Motorsports	Chevrolet	90	27
15	12	17	Ricky Stenhouse Jr.	Roush Fenway Racing	Ford	90	22
16	11	34	Michael McDowell	Front Row Motorsports	Ford	90	21
17	18	41	Daniel Suárez	Stewart-Haas Racing	Ford	90	20
18	22	21	Paul Menard	Wood Brothers Racing	Ford	90	19
19	8	48	Jimmie Johnson	Hendrick Motorsports	Chevrolet	90	24
20	13	14	Clint Bowyer	Stewart-Haas Racing	Ford	90	24
21	2	24	William Byron	Hendrick Motorsports	Chevrolet	90	22
22	31	38	David Ragan	Front Row Motorsports	Ford	90	15
23	21	22	Joey Logano	Team Penske	Ford	90	14
24	26	36	Matt Tifft (R)	Front Row Motorsports	Ford	90	13
25	25	6	Ryan Newman	Roush Fenway Racing	Ford	90	12
26	24	96	Parker Kligerman (i)	Gaunt Brothers Racing	Toyota	90	0
27	32	15	Ross Chastain (i)	Premium Motorsports	Chevrolet	90	0
28	30	43	Bubba Wallace	Richard Petty Motorsports	Chevrolet	90	9
29	34	00	Landon Cassill (i)	StarCom Racing	Chevrolet	90	0
30	27	13	Ty Dillon	Germain Racing	Chevrolet	89	7
31	28	3	Austin Dillon	Richard Childress Racing	Chevrolet	89	6
32	36	52	Josh Bilicki (i)	Rick Ware Racing	Chevrolet	89	0
33	35	51	Cody Ware (i)	Petty Ware Racing	Chevrolet	89	0
34	33	32	Corey LaJoie	Go Fas Racing	Ford	85	3
35	23	8	Daniel Hemric (R)	Richard Childress Racing	Chevrolet	84	2
36	29	47	Ryan Preece (R)	JTG Daugherty Racing	Chevrolet	72	1
37	37	77	Reed Sorenson	Spire Motorsports	Chevrolet	65	1
Official race results

=== Race statistics ===
- Lead changes: 5 among 4 different drivers
- Cautions/Laps: 4 for 13
- Red flags: 0
- Time of race: 2 hours, 14 minutes and 17 seconds
- Average speed: 98.523 miles per hour (158.557 km/h)

== Media ==
=== Television ===
NBC Sports covered the race on the television side. Rick Allen and Steve Letarte called from the regular booth for the race; Motor Racing Network broadcaster Mike Bagley called the race from the Esses, Dale Earnhardt Jr. had the call from Turn 5, and Jeff Burton called from Turns 6 & 7. Dave Burns, Marty Snider and Kelli Stavast covered from pit lane during the race.

NBCSN
Booth announcers	Turn announcers	Pit reporters
Lap-by-lap: Rick Allen; Color-commentator: Steve Letarte	Esses Announcer: Mike Bagley; Turn 5 Announcer: Dale Earnhardt Jr. Turns 6 & 7 Announcer: Jeff Burton	Dave Burns; Marty Snider; Kelli Stavast

=== Radio ===
Motor Racing Network had the radio call for the race, which was simulcast on Sirius XM NASCAR Radio. Alex Hayden, Jeff Striegle & 2 time Watkins Glen winner Rusty Wallace covered the action when the field raced down the front straightaway. Dave Moody called the race when the field raced thru the esses. Kurt Becker covered the action when the field raced thru the inner loop and turn 5 and Kyle Rickey covered the action in turn 10 & 11. Winston Kelley, Steve Post & Kim Coon called the action from the pits for MRN.

MRN
Booth announcers	Turn announcers	Pit reporters
Lead announcer: Alex Hayden; Announcer: Jeff Striegle; Announcer: Rusty Wallace	Esses: Dave Moody; Inner loop & Turn 5: Kurt Becker; Turn 10 & 11: Kyle Rickey	Winston Kelley; Steve Post; Kim Coon

== Standings after the race ==
Drivers' Championship standings

	Pos	Driver	Points
1	1	Kyle Busch	851
1	2	Joey Logano	838 (–13)
	3	Kevin Harvick	777 (–74)
	4	Denny Hamlin	771 (–80)
	5	Martin Truex Jr.	753 (–98)
	6	Brad Keselowski	728 (–123)
	7	Kurt Busch	679 (–172)
	8	Chase Elliott	676 (–175)
	9	Aric Almirola	640 (–211)
	10	Ryan Blaney	633 (–218)
	11	Alex Bowman	623 (–228)
	12	William Byron	604 (–247)
	13	Erik Jones	598 (–253)
	14	Kyle Larson	590 (–261)
	15	Clint Bowyer	556 (–295)
1	16	Jimmie Johnson	544 (–307)
Official driver's standings

Manufacturers' Championship standings

Pos	Manufacturer	Points
1	Toyota	802
2	Ford	776 (–26)
3	Chevrolet	748 (–54)

- Note: Only the first 16 positions are included for the driver standings.
- . – Driver has clinched a position in the Monster Energy NASCAR Cup Series playoffs.

Previous race: 2019 Gander RV 400 (Pocono)	Monster Energy NASCAR Cup Series; 2019 season	Next race: 2019 Consumers Energy 400
