= 2021 Dixie Vodka 400 =

NASCAR Cup Series race

Race details
- Race 3 of 36 in the 2021 NASCAR Cup Series
- Date: February 28, 2021
- Location: Homestead-Miami Speedway in Homestead, Florida
- Course: Permanent racing facility
- Course length: 1.5 miles (2.4 km)
- Distance: 267 laps, 400.5 mi (640.8 km)
- Average speed: 124.669 miles per hour (200.635 km/h)

Pole position
| Driver | Denny Hamlin | Joe Gibbs Racing |
- Grid positions set by competition-based formula

Most laps led
| Driver | William Byron | Hendrick Motorsports |
- Laps: 102

Winner
| No. 24 | William Byron | Hendrick Motorsports |

Television in the United States
- Network: Fox
- Announcers: Mike Joy, Jeff Gordon and Clint Bowyer
- Nielsen ratings: 4.239 million

Radio in the United States
- Radio: MRN
- Booth announcers: Alex Hayden and Jeff Striegle
- Turn announcers: Dave Moody (1 & 2) and Mike Bagley (3 & 4)

The 2021 Dixie Vodka 400 was a NASCAR Cup Series race that was held on February 28, 2021 at Homestead-Miami Speedway in Homestead, Florida. Contested over 267 laps on the 1.5 mile (2.4 km) oval, it was the third race of the 2021 NASCAR Cup Series season.

== Report ==
=== Background ===
2021 Dixie Vodka 400 program cover

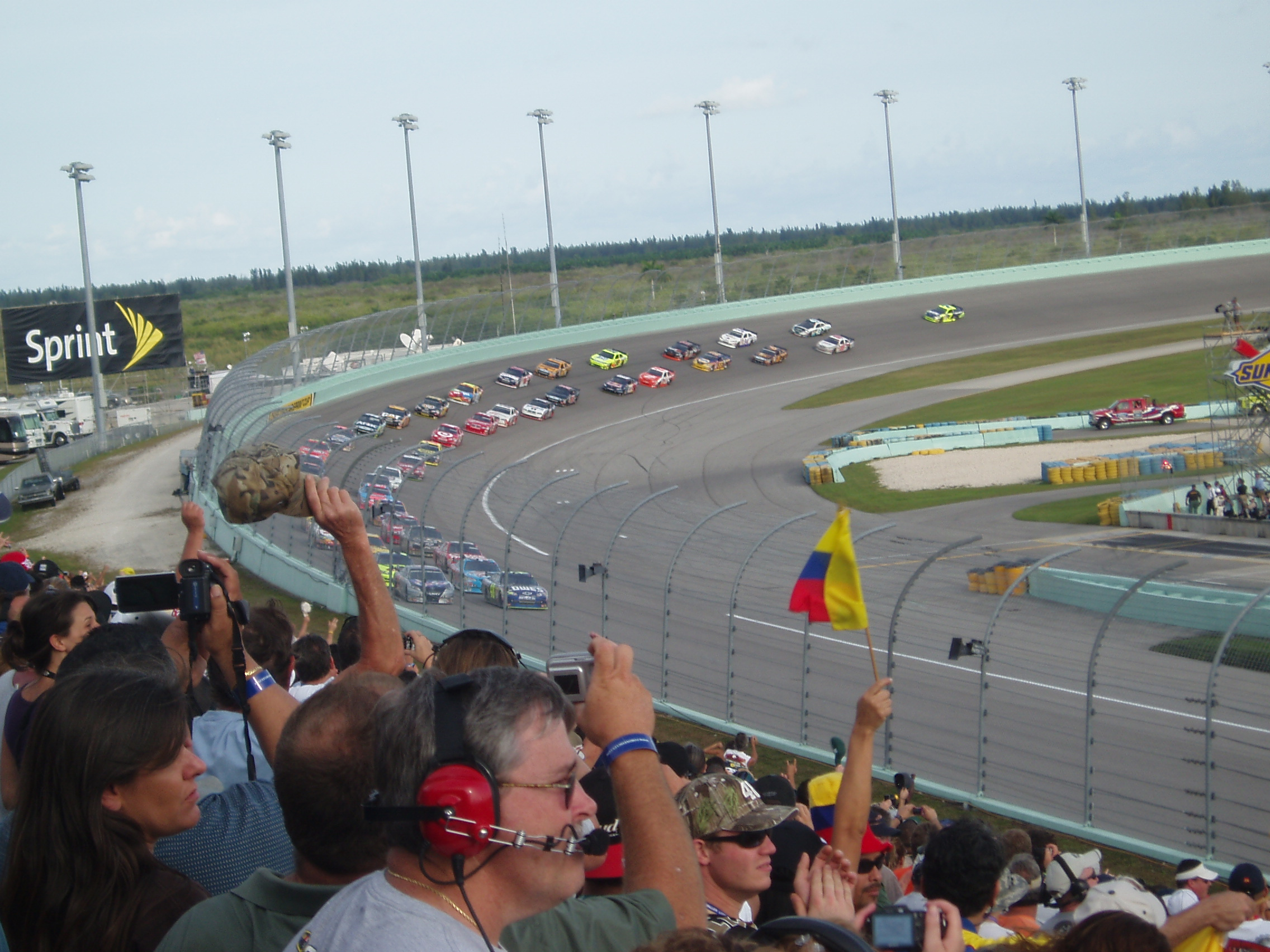
Homestead-Miami Speedway, the track where the race was held.

Homestead-Miami Speedway is a motor racing track located in Homestead, Florida. The track, which has several configurations, has promoted several series of racing, including NASCAR, the NTT IndyCar Series and the Grand-Am Rolex Sports Car Series

From 2002 to 2019, Homestead-Miami Speedway hosted the final race of the season in all three of NASCAR's series: the NASCAR Cup Series, Xfinity Series and Camping World Truck Series.

==== Entry list ====
- (R) denotes rookie driver.
- (i) denotes driver who are ineligible for series driver points.

| No. | Driver | Team | Manufacturer |
|---|---|---|---|
| 00 | Quin Houff | StarCom Racing | Chevrolet |
| 1 | Kurt Busch | Chip Ganassi Racing | Chevrolet |
| 2 | Brad Keselowski | Team Penske | Ford |
| 3 | Austin Dillon | Richard Childress Racing | Chevrolet |
| 4 | Kevin Harvick | Stewart-Haas Racing | Ford |
| 5 | Kyle Larson | Hendrick Motorsports | Chevrolet |
| 6 | Ryan Newman | Roush Fenway Racing | Ford |
| 7 | Corey LaJoie | Spire Motorsports | Chevrolet |
| 8 | Tyler Reddick | Richard Childress Racing | Chevrolet |
| 9 | Chase Elliott | Hendrick Motorsports | Chevrolet |
| 10 | Aric Almirola | Stewart-Haas Racing | Ford |
| 11 | Denny Hamlin | Joe Gibbs Racing | Toyota |
| 12 | Ryan Blaney | Team Penske | Ford |
| 14 | Chase Briscoe (R) | Stewart-Haas Racing | Ford |
| 15 | James Davison | Rick Ware Racing | Chevrolet |
| 17 | Chris Buescher | Roush Fenway Racing | Ford |
| 18 | Kyle Busch | Joe Gibbs Racing | Toyota |
| 19 | Martin Truex Jr. | Joe Gibbs Racing | Toyota |
| 20 | Christopher Bell | Joe Gibbs Racing | Toyota |
| 21 | Matt DiBenedetto | Wood Brothers Racing | Ford |
| 22 | Joey Logano | Team Penske | Ford |
| 23 | Bubba Wallace | 23XI Racing | Toyota |
| 24 | William Byron | Hendrick Motorsports | Chevrolet |
| 34 | Michael McDowell | Front Row Motorsports | Ford |
| 37 | Ryan Preece | JTG Daugherty Racing | Chevrolet |
| 38 | Anthony Alfredo (R) | Front Row Motorsports | Ford |
| 41 | Cole Custer | Stewart-Haas Racing | Ford |
| 42 | Ross Chastain | Chip Ganassi Racing | Chevrolet |
| 43 | Erik Jones | Richard Petty Motorsports | Chevrolet |
| 47 | Ricky Stenhouse Jr. | JTG Daugherty Racing | Chevrolet |
| 48 | Alex Bowman | Hendrick Motorsports | Chevrolet |
| 51 | Cody Ware (i) | Petty Ware Racing | Chevrolet |
| 52 | Josh Bilicki | Rick Ware Racing | Ford |
| 53 | Garrett Smithley (i) | Rick Ware Racing | Chevrolet |
| 66 | Timmy Hill (i) | MBM Motorsports | Toyota |
| 77 | Justin Haley (i) | Spire Motorsports | Chevrolet |
| 78 | B. J. McLeod (i) | Live Fast Motorsports | Ford |
| 99 | Daniel Suárez | Trackhouse Racing Team | Chevrolet |
Official entry list

== Qualifying ==
Denny Hamlin was awarded the pole for the race as determined by competition-based formula.

=== Starting Lineup ===
| Pos | No. | Driver | Team | Manufacturer |
|---|---|---|---|---|
| 1 | 11 | Denny Hamlin | Joe Gibbs Racing | Toyota |
| 2 | 22 | Joey Logano | Team Penske | Ford |
| 3 | 20 | Christopher Bell | Joe Gibbs Racing | Toyota |
| 4 | 4 | Kevin Harvick | Stewart-Haas Racing | Ford |
| 5 | 1 | Kurt Busch | Chip Ganassi Racing | Chevrolet |
| 6 | 34 | Michael McDowell | Front Row Motorsports | Ford |
| 7 | 2 | Brad Keselowski | Team Penske | Ford |
| 8 | 37 | Ryan Preece | JTG Daugherty Racing | Chevrolet |
| 9 | 19 | Martin Truex Jr. | Joe Gibbs Racing | Toyota |
| 10 | 41 | Cole Custer | Stewart-Haas Racing | Ford |
| 11 | 9 | Chase Elliott | Hendrick Motorsports | Chevrolet |
| 12 | 17 | Chris Buescher | Roush Fenway Racing | Ford |
| 13 | 48 | Alex Bowman | Hendrick Motorsports | Chevrolet |
| 14 | 12 | Ryan Blaney | Team Penske | Ford |
| 15 | 47 | Ricky Stenhouse Jr. | JTG Daugherty Racing | Chevrolet |
| 16 | 10 | Aric Almirola | Stewart-Haas Racing | Ford |
| 17 | 5 | Kyle Larson | Hendrick Motorsports | Chevrolet |
| 18 | 43 | Erik Jones | Richard Petty Motorsports | Chevrolet |
| 19 | 23 | Bubba Wallace | 23XI Racing | Toyota |
| 20 | 77 | Justin Haley (i) | Spire Motorsports | Chevrolet |
| 21 | 99 | Daniel Suárez | Trackhouse Racing Team | Chevrolet |
| 22 | 3 | Austin Dillon | Richard Childress Racing | Chevrolet |
| 23 | 6 | Ryan Newman | Roush Fenway Racing | Ford |
| 24 | 18 | Kyle Busch | Joe Gibbs Racing | Toyota |
| 25 | 7 | Corey LaJoie | Spire Motorsports | Chevrolet |
| 26 | 51 | Cody Ware (i) | Petty Ware Racing | Chevrolet |
| 27 | 38 | Anthony Alfredo (R) | Front Row Motorsports | Ford |
| 28 | 53 | Garrett Smithley (i) | Rick Ware Racing | Chevrolet |
| 29 | 15 | James Davison | Rick Ware Racing | Chevrolet |
| 30 | 14 | Chase Briscoe (R) | Stewart-Haas Racing | Ford |
| 31 | 24 | William Byron | Hendrick Motorsports | Chevrolet |
| 32 | 42 | Ross Chastain | Chip Ganassi Racing | Chevrolet |
| 33 | 66 | Timmy Hill (i) | MBM Motorsports | Toyota |
| 34 | 78 | B. J. McLeod (i) | Live Fast Motorsports | Ford |
| 35 | 8 | Tyler Reddick | Richard Childress Racing | Chevrolet |
| 36 | 52 | Josh Bilicki | Rick Ware Racing | Ford |
| 37 | 21 | Matt DiBenedetto | Wood Brothers Racing | Ford |
| 38 | 00 | Quin Houff | StarCom Racing | Chevrolet |
Official starting lineup

== Race ==
William Byron took his second Cup Series win, driving a Chevrolet for the Hendrick Motorsports team. Tyler Reddick overtook other drivers after sunset and finished in second. Martin Truex Jr. finished third after he made a pit stop for new tires at the end of the second stage. Kyle Larson had his best result in nearly a year by finishing fourth. Kevin Harvick finished fifth, which was the best result for a Ford driver. Michael McDowell took his third top ten finish in a row by coming sixth. Ryan Newman was seventh, while the two Busch brothers finished eighth and tenth to sandwich ninth-placed Alex Bowman. Kurt Busch recovered to eighth after losing positions to a loose wheel.

=== Stage Results ===
Stage One Laps: 80

| Pos | No | Driver | Team | Manufacturer | Points |
|---|---|---|---|---|---|
| 1 | 17 | Chris Buescher | Roush Fenway Racing | Ford | 10 |
| 2 | 2 | Brad Keselowski | Team Penske | Ford | 9 |
| 3 | 19 | Martin Truex Jr. | Joe Gibbs Racing | Toyota | 8 |
| 4 | 24 | William Byron | Hendrick Motorsports | Chevrolet | 7 |
| 5 | 48 | Alex Bowman | Hendrick Motorsports | Chevrolet | 6 |
| 6 | 5 | Kyle Larson | Hendrick Motorsports | Chevrolet | 5 |
| 7 | 22 | Joey Logano | Team Penske | Ford | 4 |
| 8 | 9 | Chase Elliott | Hendrick Motorsports | Chevrolet | 3 |
| 9 | 1 | Kurt Busch | Chip Ganassi Racing | Chevrolet | 2 |
| 10 | 3 | Austin Dillon | Richard Childress Racing | Chevrolet | 1 |
Official stage one results

Stage Two Laps: 80

| Pos | No | Driver | Team | Manufacturer | Points |
|---|---|---|---|---|---|
| 1 | 24 | William Byron | Hendrick Motorsports | Chevrolet | 10 |
| 2 | 11 | Denny Hamlin | Joe Gibbs Racing | Toyota | 9 |
| 3 | 1 | Kurt Busch | Chip Ganassi Racing | Chevrolet | 8 |
| 4 | 19 | Martin Truex Jr. | Joe Gibbs Racing | Toyota | 7 |
| 5 | 5 | Kyle Larson | Hendrick Motorsports | Chevrolet | 6 |
| 6 | 17 | Chris Buescher | Roush Fenway Racing | Ford | 5 |
| 7 | 4 | Kevin Harvick | Stewart-Haas Racing | Ford | 4 |
| 8 | 12 | Ryan Blaney | Team Penske | Ford | 3 |
| 9 | 48 | Alex Bowman | Hendrick Motorsports | Chevrolet | 2 |
| 10 | 2 | Brad Keselowski | Team Penske | Ford | 1 |
Official stage two results

=== Final Stage Results ===
Stage Three Laps: 107

| Pos | Grid | No | Driver | Team | Manufacturer | Laps | Points |
|---|---|---|---|---|---|---|---|
| 1 | 31 | 24 | William Byron | Hendrick Motorsports | Chevrolet | 267 | 57 |
| 2 | 35 | 8 | Tyler Reddick | Richard Childress Racing | Chevrolet | 267 | 35 |
| 3 | 9 | 19 | Martin Truex Jr. | Joe Gibbs Racing | Toyota | 267 | 49 |
| 4 | 17 | 5 | Kyle Larson | Hendrick Motorsports | Chevrolet | 267 | 44 |
| 5 | 4 | 4 | Kevin Harvick | Stewart-Haas Racing | Ford | 267 | 36 |
| 6 | 6 | 34 | Michael McDowell | Front Row Motorsports | Ford | 267 | 31 |
| 7 | 23 | 6 | Ryan Newman | Roush Fenway Racing | Ford | 267 | 30 |
| 8 | 5 | 1 | Kurt Busch | Chip Ganassi Racing | Chevrolet | 267 | 39 |
| 9 | 13 | 48 | Alex Bowman | Hendrick Motorsports | Chevrolet | 267 | 36 |
| 10 | 24 | 18 | Kyle Busch | Joe Gibbs Racing | Toyota | 267 | 27 |
| 11 | 1 | 11 | Denny Hamlin | Joe Gibbs Racing | Toyota | 267 | 35 |
| 12 | 22 | 3 | Austin Dillon | Richard Childress Racing | Chevrolet | 267 | 26 |
| 13 | 15 | 47 | Ricky Stenhouse Jr. | JTG Daugherty Racing | Chevrolet | 267 | 24 |
| 14 | 11 | 9 | Chase Elliott | Hendrick Motorsports | Chevrolet | 267 | 26 |
| 15 | 21 | 99 | Daniel Suárez | Trackhouse Racing Team | Chevrolet | 267 | 22 |
| 16 | 7 | 2 | Brad Keselowski | Team Penske | Ford | 267 | 31 |
| 17 | 32 | 42 | Ross Chastain | Chip Ganassi Racing | Chevrolet | 267 | 20 |
| 18 | 30 | 14 | Chase Briscoe (R) | Stewart-Haas Racing | Ford | 267 | 19 |
| 19 | 12 | 17 | Chris Buescher | Roush Fenway Racing | Ford | 267 | 33 |
| 20 | 3 | 20 | Christopher Bell | Joe Gibbs Racing | Toyota | 267 | 17 |
| 21 | 8 | 37 | Ryan Preece | JTG Daugherty Racing | Chevrolet | 267 | 16 |
| 22 | 19 | 23 | Bubba Wallace | 23XI Racing | Toyota | 267 | 15 |
| 23 | 10 | 41 | Cole Custer | Stewart-Haas Racing | Ford | 267 | 14 |
| 24 | 27 | 38 | Anthony Alfredo (R) | Front Row Motorsports | Ford | 267 | 13 |
| 25 | 2 | 22 | Joey Logano | Team Penske | Ford | 267 | 16 |
| 26 | 20 | 77 | Justin Haley (i) | Spire Motorsports | Chevrolet | 266 | 0 |
| 27 | 18 | 43 | Erik Jones | Richard Petty Motorsports | Chevrolet | 266 | 10 |
| 28 | 37 | 21 | Matt DiBenedetto | Wood Brothers Racing | Ford | 266 | 9 |
| 29 | 14 | 12 | Ryan Blaney | Team Penske | Ford | 266 | 11 |
| 30 | 16 | 10 | Aric Almirola | Stewart-Haas Racing | Ford | 264 | 7 |
| 31 | 28 | 53 | Garrett Smithley (i) | Rick Ware Racing | Chevrolet | 263 | 0 |
| 32 | 26 | 51 | Cody Ware (i) | Petty Ware Racing | Chevrolet | 261 | 0 |
| 33 | 36 | 52 | Josh Bilicki | Rick Ware Racing | Ford | 259 | 4 |
| 34 | 34 | 78 | B. J. McLeod (i) | Live Fast Motorsports | Ford | 258 | 0 |
| 35 | 38 | 00 | Quin Houff | StarCom Racing | Chevrolet | 258 | 2 |
| 36 | 25 | 7 | Corey LaJoie | Spire Motorsports | Chevrolet | 151 | 1 |
| 37 | 29 | 15 | James Davison | Rick Ware Racing | Chevrolet | 61 | 1 |
| 38 | 33 | 66 | Timmy Hill (i) | MBM Motorsports | Toyota | 21 | 0 |
Official race results

=== Race statistics ===
- Lead changes: 20 among 9 different drivers
- Cautions/Laps: 6 for 36
- Red flags: 0
- Time of race: 3 hours, 12 minutes and 45 seconds
- Average speed: 124.669 miles per hour (200.635 km/h)

== Media ==
=== Television ===
The Dixie Vodka 400 was carried by Fox in the United States. Mike Joy, 2012 Homestead winner Jeff Gordon and Clint Bowyer called the race from the broadcast booth. Jamie Little and Regan Smith handled pit road for the television side. Larry McReynolds provided insight from the Fox Sports studio in Charlotte.

Fox
| Booth announcers | Pit reporters | In-race analyst |
|---|---|---|
| Lap-by-lap: Mike Joy; Color-commentator: Jeff Gordon; Color-commentator: Clint Bowyer | Jamie Little; Regan Smith | Larry McReynolds |

=== Radio ===
MRN had the radio call for the race, which was also simulcast on Sirius XM NASCAR Radio. Alex Hayden and Jeff Striegle called the action of the race for MRN when the field raced down the front straightaway. Dave Moody covered the action for MRN in turns 1 & 2, and Mike Bagley had the call of the action from turns 3 & 4. Steve Post and Kim Coon covered the action of the race for MRN on pit road.

MRN Radio
| Booth announcers | Turn announcers | Pit reporters |
|---|---|---|
| Lead announcer: Alex Hayden; Announcer: Jeff Striegle | Turns 1 & 2: Dave Moody; Turns 3 & 4: Mike Bagley | Steve Post; Kim Coon |

== Standings after the race ==
Drivers' Championship standings

| | Pos | Driver | Points |
|---|---|---|---|
| | 1 | Denny Hamlin | 139 |
| 1 | 2 | Kevin Harvick | 119 (–20) |
| 1 | 3 | Joey Logano | 108 (–31) |
| 2 | 4 | Michael McDowell | 106 (–33) |
| | 5 | Chase Elliott | 105 (–34) |
| 2 | 6 | Kurt Busch | 104 (–35) |
| 3 | 7 | Christopher Bell | 99 (–40) |
| 4 | 8 | Kyle Larson | 97 (–42) |
| 5 | 9 | Martin Truex Jr. | 96 (–43) |
| | 10 | Brad Keselowski | 95 (–44) |
| 2 | 11 | Austin Dillon | 90 (–49) |
| 5 | 12 | Ryan Preece | 90 (–49) |
| 16 | 13 | William Byron | 76 (–63) |
| 3 | 14 | Cole Custer | 68 (–71) |
| 3 | 15 | Chris Buescher | 67 (–72) |
| 3 | 16 | Bubba Wallace | 67 (–72) |
Official driver's standings

Manufacturers' Championship standings

| | Pos | Manufacturer | Points |
|---|---|---|---|
| 2 | 1 | Chevrolet | 108 |
| 1 | 2 | Ford | 107 (–1) |
| 1 | 3 | Toyota | 106 (–2) |

- Note: Only the first 16 positions are included for the driver standings.

| Previous race: 2021 O'Reilly Auto Parts 253 | NASCAR Cup Series; 2021 season | Next race: 2021 Pennzoil 400 |
