= StarCom Racing =

Stock car racing team

- Owner(s): William Woehlemann; Michael Kohler; Matthew Kohler; Derrike Cope
- Base: Salisbury, North Carolina
- Series: Michelin Pilot Challenge, NASCAR Cup Series (Formerly)
- Race drivers: 12. Andy Lally, Nick Tucker
- Manufacturer: Chevrolet; Hyundai
- Opened: 2017

Career
- Debut: 2017 Hollywood Casino 400 (Kansas)
- Latest race: 2021 NASCAR Cup Series Championship Race (Phoenix Raceway)
- Races competed: 164
- Drivers' Championships: 0
- Race victories: 0
- Pole positions: 0

StarCom Racing (SCR) is an American racing team that competes part time in the Michelin Pilot Challenge and formerly competed full-time in the NASCAR Cup Series. Based in Salisbury, North Carolina, the team fields the No. 12 Hyundai Elantra TCR in a partnership with Nitro Motorsports, with Andy Lally. In NASCAR, the team fielded the No. 00 Chevrolet Camaro ZL1 1LE full-time for Quin Houff in a technical alliance with Richard Childress Racing. Veteran NASCAR driver Derrike Cope served as the team's manager. The team folded in 2021 and its assets were bought by 23XI Racing later that year.

On February 1, 2024, it was announced that the team would reopen and run select races in the Michelin Pilot Challenge in collaboration with Nitro Motorsports.

== NASCAR Cup Series ==
On September 25, 2017 StarCom Fiber announced their intentions to field a car in the Monster Energy NASCAR Cup Series. The team selected veteran driver Derrike Cope to drive the No. 00 StarCom Fiber Chevrolet, whom they had previously sponsored throughout the 2017 season at Premium Motorsports. Almost a month later, ESPN reported SCR would be making its Cup Series debut at Kansas Speedway for the 2017 Hollywood Casino 400.

On September 1, 2021, Catchfence.com reported that StarCom sold its charter. On September 15, shop foreman and mechanical director Charlie Langenstein confirmed that StarCom Racing would shut down operations at the end of the 2021 season. On November 16, it was revealed that StarCom's charter was sold to 23XI Racing. Following the team's closure, Woehlemann and the Kohler brothers would join The Money Team Racing, owned by boxer Floyd Mayweather Jr.

=== Car No. 00 history ===
==== Part Time (2017) ====
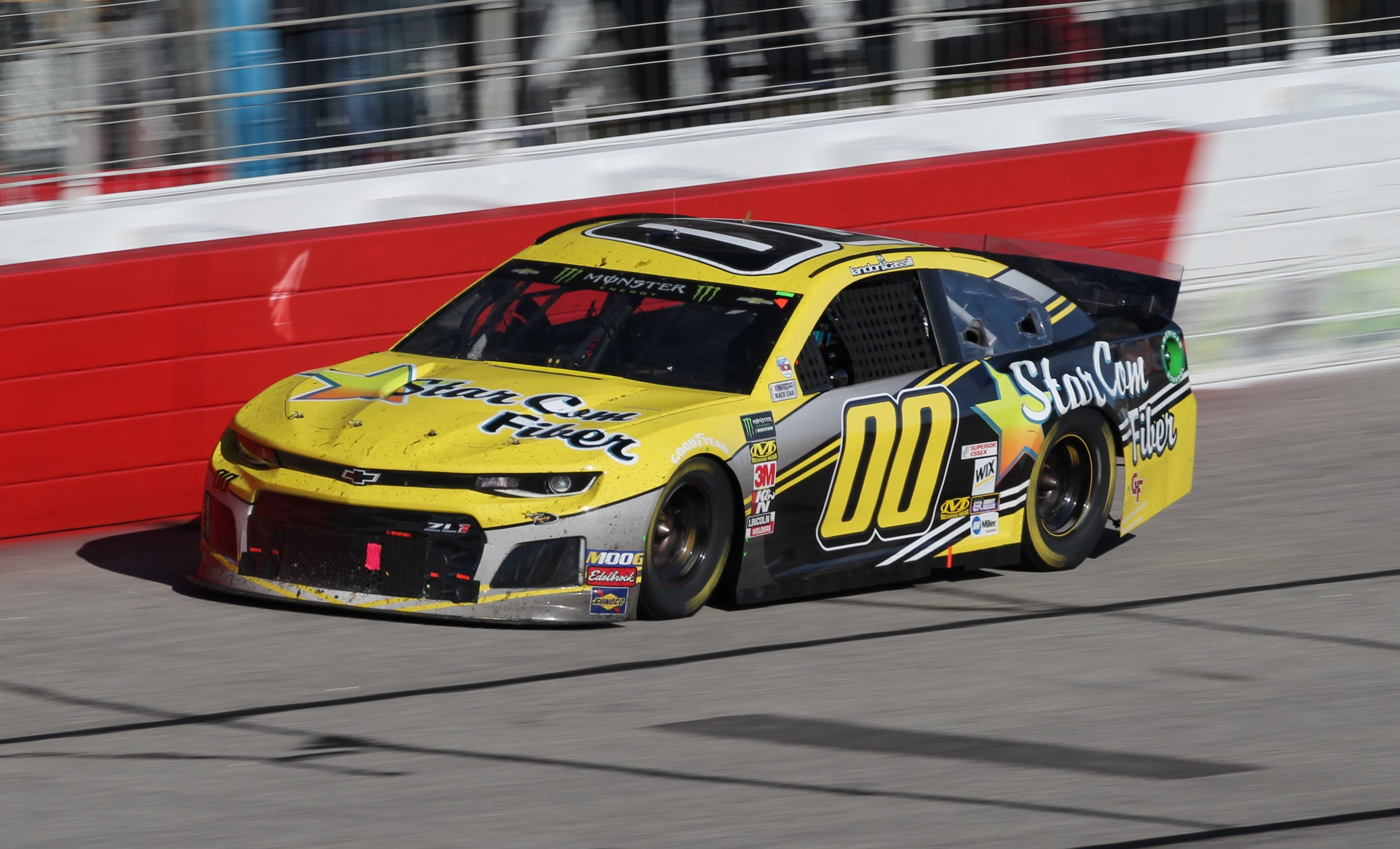
Landon Cassill in the No. 00 at Atlanta Motor Speedway in 2019.

On September 25, 2017, StarCom Fiber, who had sponsored Derrike Cope throughout the season at Premium Motorsports, announced their intentions to field a car in the MENCS, selecting driver Derrike Cope to drive No. 00 StarCom Fiber Chevrolet. On October 17, 2017, it was reported StarCom Racing would make its MENCS debut at Kansas Speedway for the 2017 Hollywood Casino 400.

Before their first planned attempt at Dover, the No. 00 withdrew from the race due to not having sufficient staff for the team to successfully operate. On October 22, The team would go on to successfully debut at Kansas, starting 40th and finishing in 40th after numerous problems plagued the team. On October 29, Cope would later announce the team would attempt two more NASCAR premier series races next month at Texas and Phoenix. That same day, SCR announced the team had decided that they would no longer attempt to race in Texas, instead focusing all of their effort on Phoenix. Phoenix once again got off to a rough start for the team, as they had to cut the first practice short with engine issues. When the problem was not fixed by qualifying, Cope and the team decided to skip qualifying and take the last position on the grid. The race, however, went much better for the team. After starting last, the team quickly moved out of the last position. After a series of problems for other teams, the No. 00 car managed a 32nd-place run, completing the race.

==== Full Time (2018) ====
On January 24, 2018, StarCom announced that they had secured a charter and will run the full schedule, with Cope planning to drive the majority of the races. The charter was leased from Richard Childress Racing, which had closed down the No. 27 team. However, Jeffrey Earnhardt was later announced as the driver for the 2018 Daytona 500. Earnhardt piloted the car for the first five races of the season with sponsorship from VRX Simulators. He earned a best finish of 21st at Daytona. On March 18, 2018, Earnhardt and StarCom Racing had agreed to part ways. Earnhardt was replaced by Landon Cassill, who brought two races of sponsorship from USFRA.org. On April 10, 2018, the team announced that TW Cable, LLC and Superior Essex would sponsor Cassill at Bristol. On April 17, 2018, it was announced that NASCAR Xfinity Series driver Joey Gase would drive the car at Talladega with sponsorship from Gase's Xfinity Series sponsor, Sparks Energy. Cassill returned to the car at Dover with sponsorship from RNH Electric. Road course ringer Tomy Drissi was hired to drive the #00 at Sonoma. At the fall Las Vegas race, Cassill finished 18th place, the best finish by the team so far, and the feat was achieved again at the 2018 1000Bulbs.com 500 with Joey Gase behind the wheel.

==== Landon Cassill (2019) ====
After the 2018 season, StarCom Racing announced that Cassill had signed full-time with the team for the 2019 season. In addition, the team purchased the charter they were leasing from RCR. He finished the season 33rd in points.

==== Quin Houff (2020-2021) ====
On November 25, 2019, crew chief Joe Williams announced that he had left the No. 00 team. StarCom Racing announced his replacement for 2020 was George Church. The next day, it was announced that Quin Houff would pilot the 00 full time in 2020 and 2021.

StarCom had a disappointing 2020 campaign, earning just one top 15 finish the entire year, at Talladega. During the 2020 O'Reilly Auto Parts 500 at Texas, Houff made an ill-timed maneuver towards pit road, causing damage to the cars of Christopher Bell and Matt DiBenedetto before colliding with the outside wall. He was heavily criticized by DiBenedetto and Brad Keselowski for his actions. The team's average finish decreased from 29.3 in 2019, (with Cassill at the helm), to 31.3 in 2020 with rookie Houff.

The team's run in 2021 fared worse, with just one top-20 finish at Talladega. The No. 00 finished the season 38th in points; three places lower than the previous season. The team closed its doors and sold its charter after NASCAR threatened to seize the charter. It would have been the first time that NASCAR exercised their charter seizure policy, where teams finishing in the bottom of the owner points standings for three seasons in a row could be required to sell their charter at NASCAR's discretion. The charter would then be sold to 23XI Racing for US$13.5 million.

==== Car No. 00 results ====
Year	Driver	No.	Make	1	2	3	4	5	6	7	8	9	10	11	12	13	14	15	16	17	18	19	20	21	22	23	24	25	26	27	28	29	30	31	32	33	34	35	36	Owners	Pts
2017	Derrike Cope	00	Chevy	DAY	ATL	LVS	PHO	CAL	MAR	TEX	BRI	RCH	TAL	KAN	CLT	DOV	POC	MCH	SON	DAY	KEN	NHA	IND	POC	GLN	MCH	BRI	DAR	RCH	CHI	NHA	DOV; Wth	CLT	TAL	KAN; 40	MAR	TEX	PHO; 32	HOM	43rd	6
2018	Jeffrey Earnhardt	00	Chevy	DAY; 21	ATL; 34	LVS; 31	PHO; 35	CAL; 36																																34th	259
2018	Landon Cassill	00	Chevy						MAR; 38	TEX; 21	BRI; 20	RCH; 34		DOV; 31	KAN; 25	CLT; 28	POC; 31	MCH; 32		CHI; 36		KEN; 33	NHA; 37	POC; 34	GLN; 31	MCH; 29	BRI; 25	DAR; 30	IND; 31	LVS; 18		CLT; 29	DOV; 33		KAN; 29		TEX; 35	PHO; 26	HOM; 31	34th	259
2018	Joey Gase	00	Chevy										TAL; 27								DAY; 25										RCH; 35			TAL; 18		MAR; 35				34th	259
2018	Tomy Drissi	00	Chevy																SON; 32																					34th	259
2019	Landon Cassill	00	Chevy	DAY; 24	ATL; 33	LVS; 32	PHO; 33	CAL; 29	MAR; 28	TEX; 30	BRI; 26	RCH; 35	TAL; 34	DOV; 31	KAN; 37	CLT; 37	POC; 31	MCH; 29	SON; 31	CHI; 31	DAY; 11	KEN; 32	NHA; 26	POC; 28	GLN; 29	MCH; 30	BRI; 25	DAR; 25	IND; 40	LVS; 29	RCH; 28	CLT; 28	DOV; 26	TAL; 14	KAN; 37	MAR; 26	TEX; 27	PHO; 33	HOM; 28	32nd	285
2020	Quin Houff	00	Chevy	DAY; 39	LVS; 32	CAL; 35	PHO; 34	DAR; 36	DAR; 26	CLT; 35	CLT; 32	BRI; 27	ATL; 32	MAR; 34	HOM; 33	TAL; 27	POC; 40	POC; 31	IND; 23	KEN; 35	TEX; 34	KAN; 24	NHA; 32	MCH; 27	MCH; 32	DAY; 33	DOV; 33	DOV; 34	DAY; 23	DAR; 31	RCH; 32	BRI; 29	LVS; 34	TAL; 13	CLT; 28	KAN; 33	TEX; 33	MAR; 33	PHO; 39	35th	214
2021	Quin Houff	00	Chevy	DAY; 29	DAY; 40	HOM; 35	LVS; 33	PHO; 32	ATL; 33	BRI; 25	MAR; 24	RCH; 34	TAL; 37	KAN; 37	DAR; 30	DOV; 29	COA; 34	CLT; 32	SON; 36	NSH; 38	POC; 31	POC; 33	ROA; 34	ATL; 35	NHA; 35	GLN; 32	IND; 22	MCH; 30	DAY; 38	DAR; 30	RCH; 35	BRI; 34	LVS; 34	TAL; 19	CLT; 30	TEX; 31	KAN; 35	MAR; 34	PHO; 37	38th	176

=== Car No. 99 history ===
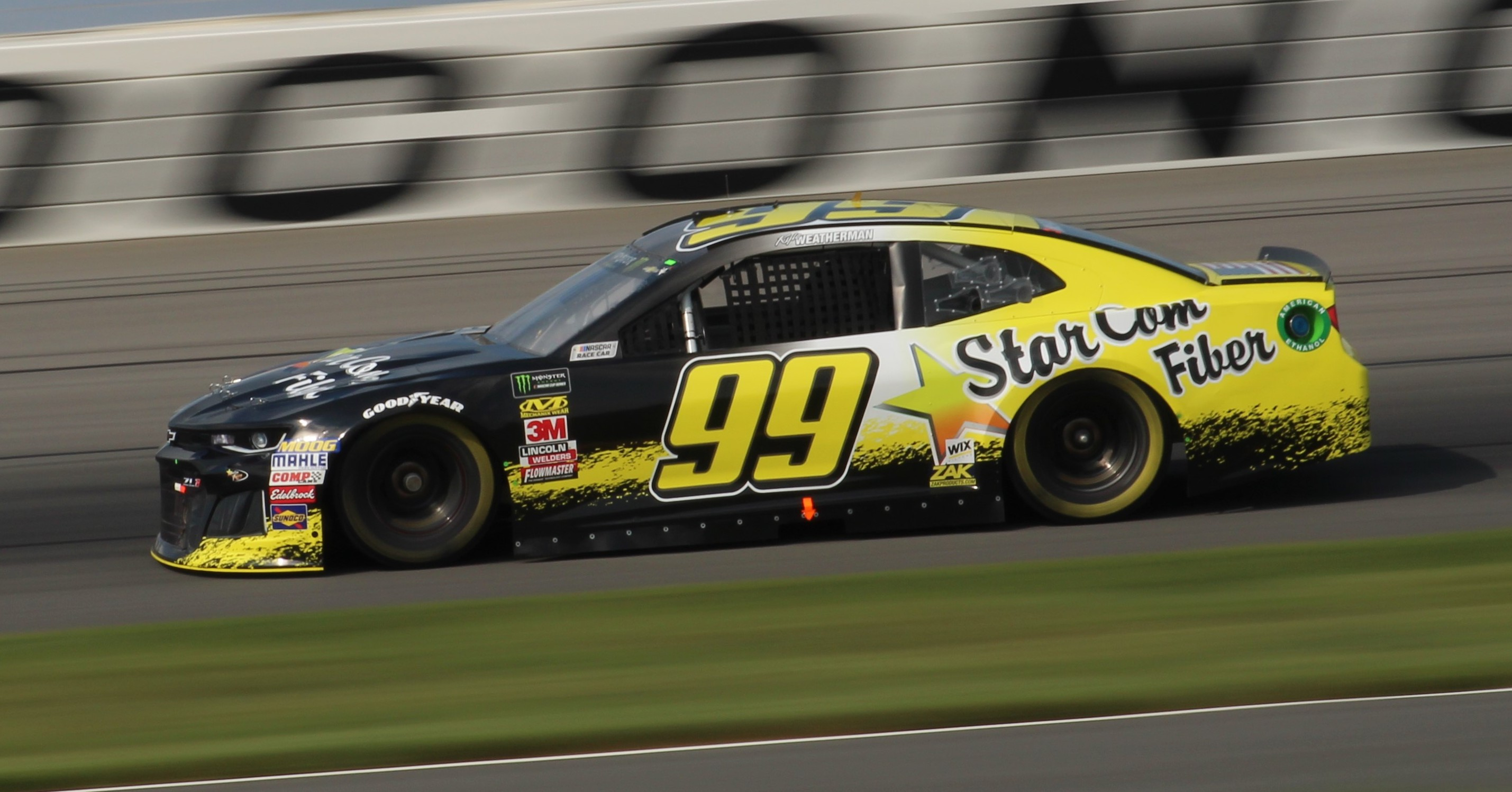
Kyle Weatherman in the No. 99 at Pocono Raceway in 2018.

Team manager Derrike Cope was originally intended to pilot the No. 00 for the majority of the 2018 Monster Energy NASCAR Cup Series schedule, however, after the hiring of Jeffrey Earnhardt to drive full-time, StarCom announced that they intended to field a second car, the No. 99, part-time for Cope and possibly other drivers. Cope announced that they were hoping to field the No. 99 beginning at Texas Motor Speedway, with Cope planning to drive unless another driver with sponsorship was found. However, the team didn't race at Texas, instead delaying the #99 car debut until the AAA 400 Drive for Autism at Dover International Speedway. An early wreck relegated Cope to 37th in his first race in the 99. The 99 car returned at Pocono with Cope, finishing 34th. Garrett Smithley made his debut in the 99 at Michigan. The race did not last long, as Smithley stripped the gears in the transmission on lap 1.Kyle Weatherman would take over the 99 for Chicagoland, finishing 33rd. Landon Cassill would pilot the 99 at Daytona while Joey Gase was in the 00. Smithley and Weatherman would run the next 3 races, with Smithley finishing 36th at Kentucky, while Weatherman would finish 31st at both New Hampshire and Pocono. Gray Gaulding would pilot the car for two races, finishing 33rd and 40th. Cope would return at Darlington to participate in the annual throwback weekend, with Bojangles sponsoring the car, paying homage to Cope's time with Cale Yarborough Motorsports. The 99 would finish second in Darlington's paint scheme contest while finishing 33rd in the race. Kyle Weatherman and Landon Cassill would split time between the 99 for the remainder of the season, with Weatherman's best finish coming at Las Vegas, a 26th, and Cassill's best finish coming at Talladega, a 22nd. After a 36th-place finish at Homestead with Weatherman, StarCom closed their No. 99 team for 2019 and they did not run a second car again.

==== Car No. 99 results ====
Year	Driver	No.	Make	1	2	3	4	5	6	7	8	9	10	11	12	13	14	15	16	17	18	19	20	21	22	23	24	25	26	27	28	29	30	31	32	33	34	35	36	Owners	Pts
2018	Derrike Cope	99	Chevy	DAY	ATL	LVS	PHO	CAL	MAR	TEX	BRI	RCH	TAL	DOV; 37	KAN	CLT	POC; 34											DAR; 33	IND											39th	82
2018	Garrett Smithley	99	Chevy															MCH; 39	SON			KEN; 36																		39th	82
2018	Kyle Weatherman	99	Chevy																	CHI; 33			NHA; 31	POC; 31	GLN					LVS; 26					KAN; 35		TEX; 34	PHO	HOM; 36	39th	82
2018	Landon Cassill	99	Chevy																		DAY; 24										RCH; 36	CLT	DOV	TAL; 22		MAR; 32				39th	82
2018	Gray Gaulding	99	Chevy																							MCH; 33	BRI; 40													39th	82

== Sports Car Racing ==
On January 18, 2024, Derrike Cope teased an announcement relating to the team on his personal Facebook page.

On February 1, StarCom Racing announced its part-time involvement in the Michelin Pilot Challenge in a partnership with Nitro Motorsports. They would field a Hyundai Elantra in the TCR class, starting with the round at Sebring in March. The team will also participate in the rounds at the Canadian Tire Motorsport Park, Road America, Indianapolis, and Road Atlanta. A driver lineup has yet to be announced.
