= 2019 Food City 500 =

Eighth race of the 2019 Monster Energy Cup Series

Race details
- Race 8 of 36 in the 2019 Monster Energy NASCAR Cup Series
- 2019 Food City 500 program cover
- Date: April 7, 2019
- Location: Bristol Motor Speedway in Bristol, Tennessee
- Course: Permanent racing facility
- Course length: 0.858 km (0.533 miles)
- Distance: 500 laps, 266.5 mi (429 km)
- Average speed: 90.527 miles per hour (145.689 km/h)

Pole position
Driver	Chase Elliott	Hendrick Motorsports
- Time: 14.568

Most laps led
Driver	Ryan Blaney	Team Penske
- Laps: 158

Winner
No. 18	Kyle Busch	Joe Gibbs Racing

Television in the United States
- Network: FS1
- Announcers: Mike Joy, Jeff Gordon and Darrell Waltrip
- Nielsen ratings: 2.806 million

Radio in the United States
- Radio: PRN
- Booth announcers: Doug Rice, Mark Garrow and Wendy Venturini
- Turn announcers: Rob Albright (Backstretch)

The 2019 Food City 500 is a Monster Energy NASCAR Cup Series race held on April 7, 2019, at Bristol Motor Speedway in Bristol, Tennessee. Contested over 500 laps on the 0.533 miles (0.858 km) concrete short track, it was the eighth race of the 2019 Monster Energy NASCAR Cup Series season.

== Report ==
=== Background ===
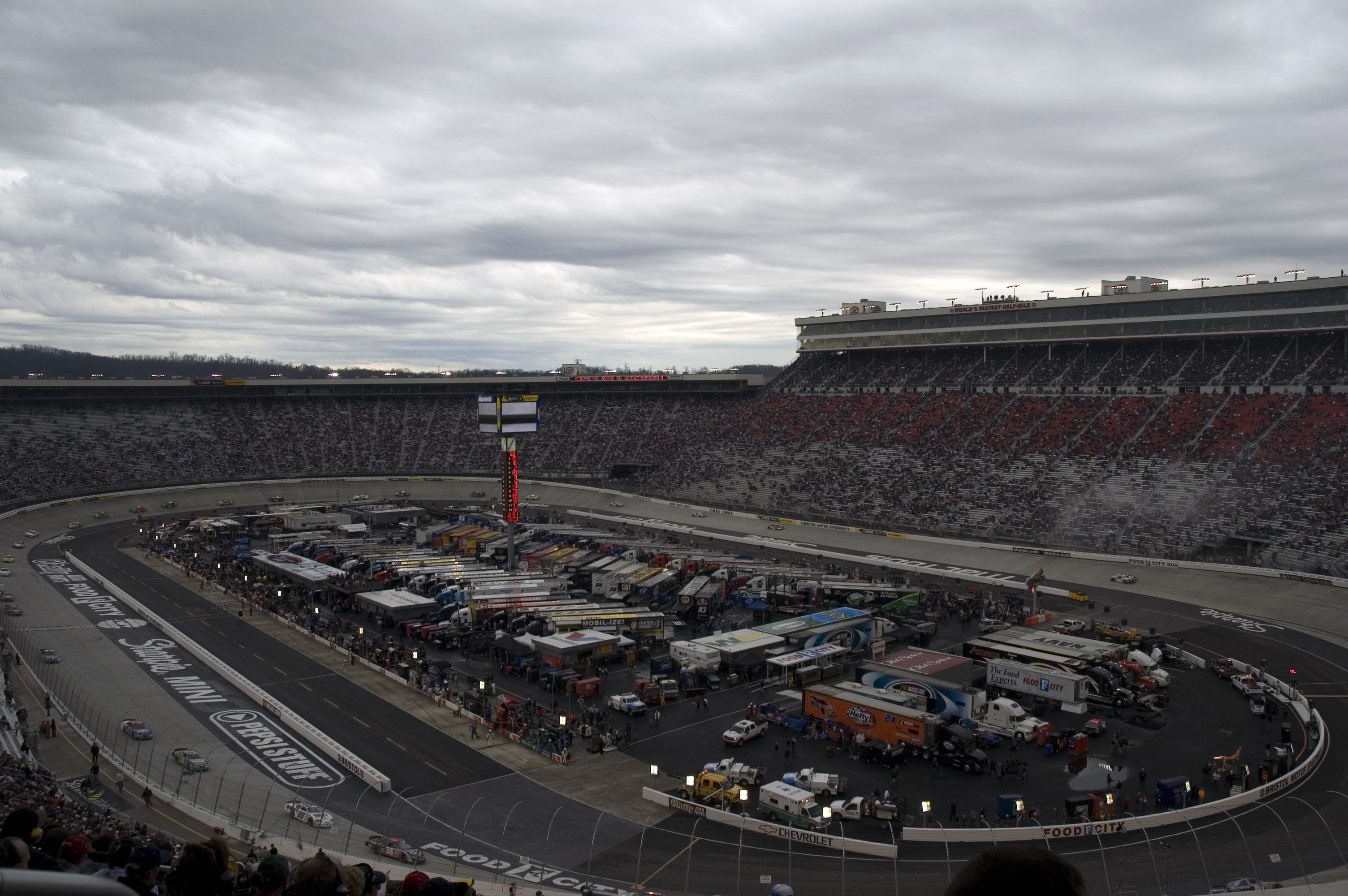
Bristol Motor Speedway, the track where the race was held.

Bristol Motor Speedway, formerly known as Bristol International Raceway and Bristol Raceway, is a NASCAR short track venue located in Bristol, Tennessee. Constructed in 1960, it held its first NASCAR race on July 30, 1961. Despite its short length, Bristol is among the most popular tracks on the NASCAR schedule because of its distinct features, which include extraordinarily steep banking, an all concrete surface, two pit roads, and stadium-like seating.

==== Entry list ====
No.	Driver	Team	Manufacturer
00	Landon Cassill	StarCom Racing	Chevrolet
1	Kurt Busch	Chip Ganassi Racing	Chevrolet
2	Brad Keselowski	Team Penske	Ford
3	Austin Dillon	Richard Childress Racing	Chevrolet
4	Kevin Harvick	Stewart-Haas Racing	Ford
6	Ryan Newman	Roush Fenway Racing	Ford
8	Daniel Hemric (R)	Richard Childress Racing	Chevrolet
9	Chase Elliott	Hendrick Motorsports	Chevrolet
10	Aric Almirola	Stewart-Haas Racing	Ford
11	Denny Hamlin	Joe Gibbs Racing	Toyota
12	Ryan Blaney	Team Penske	Ford
13	Ty Dillon	Germain Racing	Chevrolet
14	Clint Bowyer	Stewart-Haas Racing	Ford
15	Ross Chastain (i)	Premium Motorsports	Chevrolet
17	Ricky Stenhouse Jr.	Roush Fenway Racing	Ford
18	Kyle Busch	Joe Gibbs Racing	Toyota
19	Martin Truex Jr.	Joe Gibbs Racing	Toyota
20	Erik Jones	Joe Gibbs Racing	Toyota
21	Paul Menard	Wood Brothers Racing	Ford
22	Joey Logano	Team Penske	Ford
24	William Byron	Hendrick Motorsports	Chevrolet
32	Corey LaJoie	Go Fas Racing	Ford
34	Michael McDowell	Front Row Motorsports	Ford
36	Matt Tifft (R)	Front Row Motorsports	Ford
37	Chris Buescher	JTG Daugherty Racing	Chevrolet
38	David Ragan	Front Row Motorsports	Ford
41	Daniel Suárez	Stewart-Haas Racing	Ford
42	Kyle Larson	Chip Ganassi Racing	Chevrolet
43	Bubba Wallace	Richard Petty Motorsports	Chevrolet
47	Ryan Preece (R)	JTG Daugherty Racing	Chevrolet
48	Jimmie Johnson	Hendrick Motorsports	Chevrolet
51	Gray Gaulding (i)	Petty Ware Racing	Ford
52	Bayley Currey (i)	Rick Ware Racing	Chevrolet
66	Joey Gase (i)	MBM Motorsports	Toyota
77	Quin Houff	Spire Motorsports	Chevrolet
88	Alex Bowman	Hendrick Motorsports	Chevrolet
95	Matt DiBenedetto	Leavine Family Racing	Toyota
Official entry list

== First practice ==
Ryan Blaney was the fastest in the first practice session with a time of 14.804 seconds and a speed of 129.614 mph (208.594 km/h).

Pos	No.	Driver	Team	Manufacturer	Time	Speed
1	12	Ryan Blaney	Team Penske	Ford	14.804	129.614
2	22	Joey Logano	Team Penske	Ford	14.888	128.882
3	20	Erik Jones	Joe Gibbs Racing	Toyota	14.890	128.865
Official first practice results

== Qualifying ==
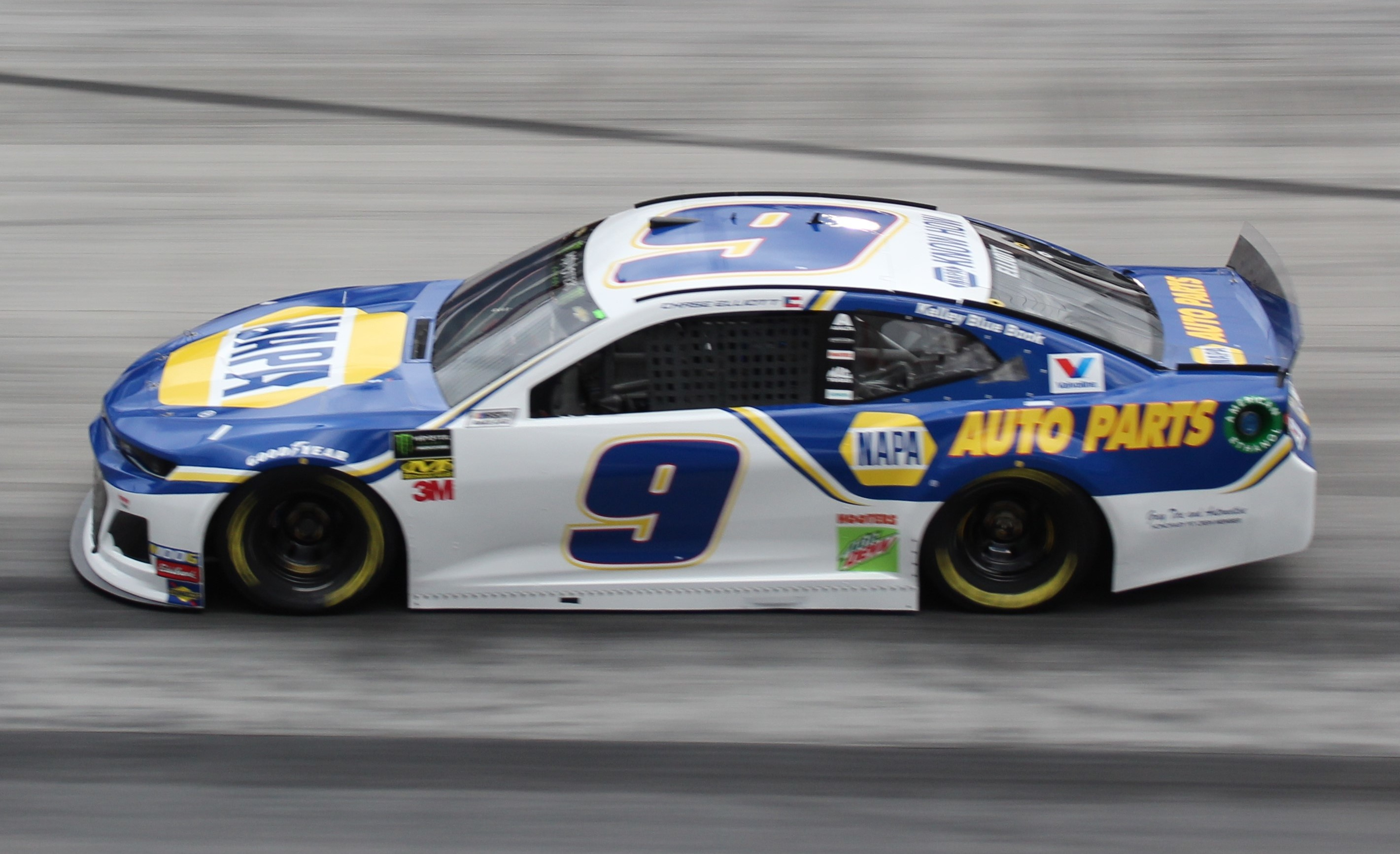
Chase Elliott started from pole position.

Chase Elliott scored the pole for the race with a time of 14.568 and a speed of 131.713 mph (211.972 km/h).

=== Qualifying results ===
Pos	No.	Driver	Team	Manufacturer	R1	R2	R3
1	9	Chase Elliott	Hendrick Motorsports	Chevrolet	14.746	14.604	14.568
2	24	William Byron	Hendrick Motorsports	Chevrolet	14.781	14.641	14.606
3	12	Ryan Blaney	Team Penske	Ford	14.671	14.528	14.627
4	20	Erik Jones	Joe Gibbs Racing	Toyota	14.715	14.636	14.641
5	11	Denny Hamlin	Joe Gibbs Racing	Toyota	14.752	14.699	14.681
6	10	Aric Almirola	Stewart-Haas Racing	Ford	14.695	14.625	14.692
7	22	Joey Logano	Team Penske	Ford	14.781	14.677	14.734
8	14	Clint Bowyer	Stewart-Haas Racing	Ford	14.707	14.665	14.741
9	21	Paul Menard	Wood Brothers Racing	Ford	14.821	14.703	14.757
10	48	Jimmie Johnson	Hendrick Motorsports	Chevrolet	14.697	14.646	14.780
11	6	Ryan Newman	Roush Fenway Racing	Ford	14.799	14.703	14.801
12	2	Brad Keselowski	Team Penske	Ford	14.872	14.693	14.803
13	4	Kevin Harvick	Stewart-Haas Racing	Ford	14.806	14.706	—
14	88	Alex Bowman	Hendrick Motorsports	Chevrolet	14.780	14.706	—
15	3	Austin Dillon	Richard Childress Racing	Chevrolet	14.835	14.729	—
16	42	Kyle Larson	Chip Ganassi Racing	Chevrolet	14.709	14.734	—
17	18	Kyle Busch	Joe Gibbs Racing	Toyota	14.783	14.780	—
18	34	Michael McDowell	Front Row Motorsports	Ford	14.880	14.784	—
19	17	Ricky Stenhouse Jr.	Roush Fenway Racing	Ford	14.745	14.799	—
20	41	Daniel Suárez	Stewart-Haas Racing	Ford	14.882	14.809	—
21	95	Matt DiBenedetto	Leavine Family Racing	Toyota	14.858	14.834	—
22	38	David Ragan	Front Row Motorsports	Ford	14.808	14.838	—
23	19	Martin Truex Jr.	Joe Gibbs Racing	Toyota	14.809	14.854	—
24	13	Ty Dillon	Germain Racing	Chevrolet	14.899	14.951	—
25	37	Chris Buescher	JTG Daugherty Racing	Chevrolet	14.914	—	—
26	8	Daniel Hemric (R)	Richard Childress Racing	Chevrolet	14.926	—	—
27	1	Kurt Busch	Chip Ganassi Racing	Chevrolet	14.955	—	—
28	43	Bubba Wallace	Richard Petty Motorsports	Chevrolet	14.957	—	—
29	36	Matt Tifft (R)	Front Row Motorsports	Ford	14.987	—	—
30	47	Ryan Preece (R)	JTG Daugherty Racing	Chevrolet	15.078	—	—
31	00	Landon Cassill	StarCom Racing	Chevrolet	15.156	—	—
32	32	Corey LaJoie	Go Fas Racing	Ford	15.268	—	—
33	51	Gray Gaulding (i)	Petty Ware Racing	Ford	15.280	—	—
34	52	Bayley Currey (i)	Rick Ware Racing	Chevrolet	15.495	—	—
35	66	Timmy Hill (i)	MBM Motorsports	Toyota	15.741	—	—
36	77	Quin Houff	Spire Motorsports	Chevrolet	16.656	—	—
37	15	Ross Chastain (i)	Premium Motorsports	Chevrolet	0.000	—	—
Official qualifying results

== Practice (post-qualifying) ==
=== Second practice ===
Erik Jones was the fastest in the second practice session with a time of 14.771 seconds and a speed of 129.903 mph (209.059 km/h).

Pos	No.	Driver	Team	Manufacturer	Time	Speed
1	20	Erik Jones	Joe Gibbs Racing	Toyota	14.771	129.903
2	11	Denny Hamlin	Joe Gibbs Racing	Toyota	14.777	129.850
3	41	Daniel Suárez	Stewart-Haas Racing	Ford	14.819	129.482
Official second practice results

=== Final practice ===
Joey Logano was the fastest in the final practice session with a time of 14.894 seconds and a speed of 128.830 mph (207.332 km/h).

Pos	No.	Driver	Team	Manufacturer	Time	Speed
1	22	Joey Logano	Team Penske	Ford	14.894	128.830
2	48	Jimmie Johnson	Hendrick Motorsports	Chevrolet	14.924	128.571
3	3	Austin Dillon	Richard Childress Racing	Chevrolet	14.925	128.563
Official final practice results

== Race ==
=== Stage results ===
Stage One Laps: 125

Pos	No	Driver	Team	Manufacturer	Points
1	13	Ty Dillon	Germain Racing	Chevrolet	10
2	14	Clint Bowyer	Stewart-Haas Racing	Ford	9
3	2	Brad Keselowski	Team Penske	Ford	8
4	22	Joey Logano	Team Penske	Ford	7
5	48	Jimmie Johnson	Hendrick Motorsports	Chevrolet	6
6	18	Kyle Busch	Joe Gibbs Racing	Toyota	5
7	12	Ryan Blaney	Team Penske	Ford	4
8	21	Paul Menard	Wood Brothers Racing	Ford	3
9	19	Martin Truex Jr.	Joe Gibbs Racing	Toyota	2
10	9	Chase Elliott	Hendrick Motorsports	Chevrolet	1
Official stage one results

Stage Two Laps: 125

Pos	No	Driver	Team	Manufacturer	Points
1	22	Joey Logano	Team Penske	Ford	10
2	12	Ryan Blaney	Team Penske	Ford	9
3	6	Ryan Newman	Roush Fenway Racing	Ford	8
4	2	Brad Keselowski	Team Penske	Ford	7
5	18	Kyle Busch	Joe Gibbs Racing	Toyota	6
6	1	Kurt Busch	Chip Ganassi Racing	Chevrolet	5
7	37	Chris Buescher	JTG Daugherty Racing	Chevrolet	4
8	14	Clint Bowyer	Stewart-Haas Racing	Ford	3
9	3	Austin Dillon	Richard Childress Racing	Chevrolet	2
10	41	Daniel Suárez	Stewart-Haas Racing	Ford	1
Official stage two results

=== Final stage results ===
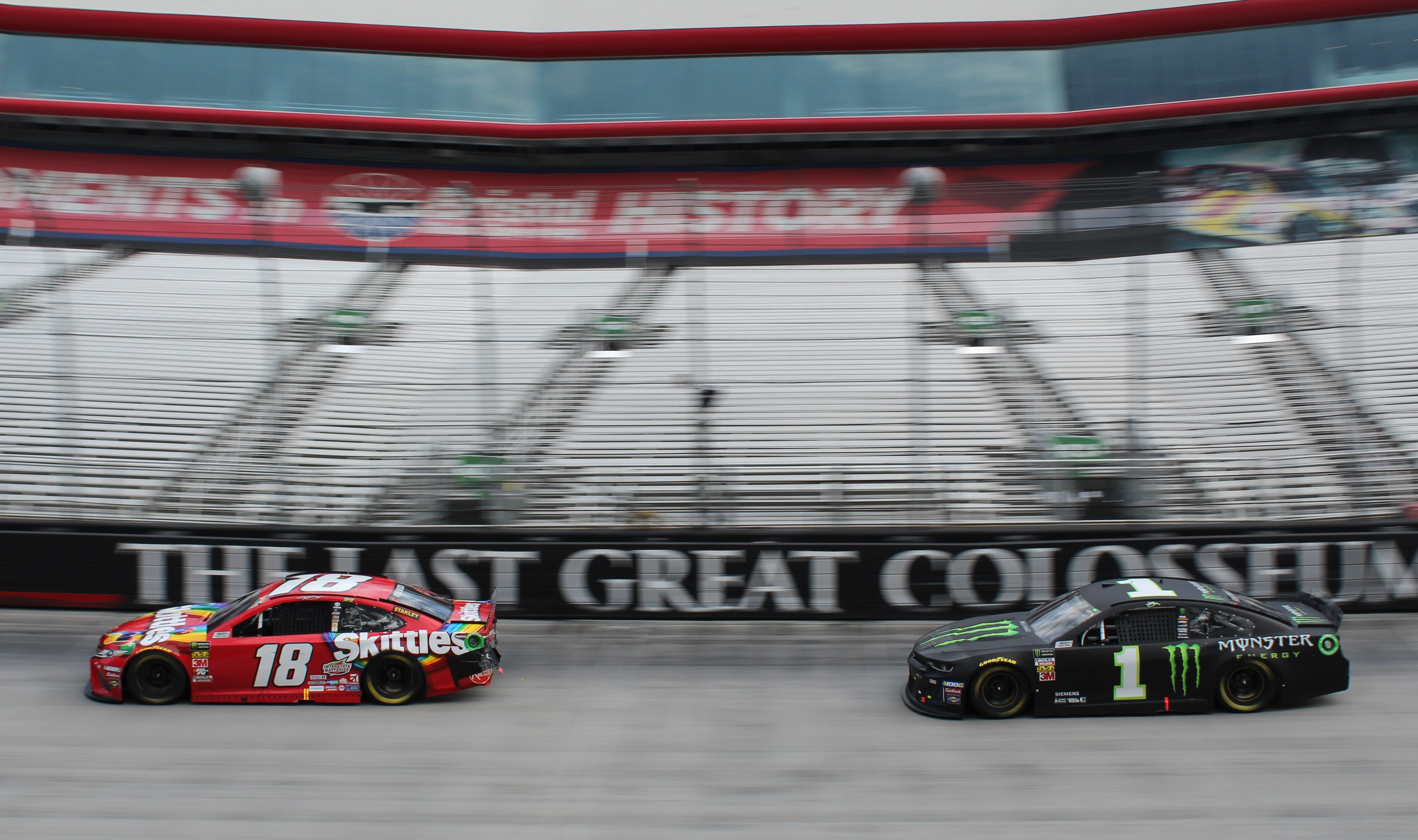
Kyle and Kurt Busch finished 1-2 in this race.

Stage Three Laps: 250

Pos	Grid	No	Driver	Team	Manufacturer	Laps	Points
1	17	18	Kyle Busch	Joe Gibbs Racing	Toyota	500	51
2	27	1	Kurt Busch	Chip Ganassi Racing	Chevrolet	500	40
3	7	22	Joey Logano	Team Penske	Ford	500	51
4	3	12	Ryan Blaney	Team Penske	Ford	500	46
5	5	11	Denny Hamlin	Joe Gibbs Racing	Toyota	500	32
6	9	21	Paul Menard	Wood Brothers Racing	Ford	500	34
7	8	14	Clint Bowyer	Stewart-Haas Racing	Ford	500	42
8	20	41	Daniel Suárez	Stewart-Haas Racing	Ford	500	30
9	11	6	Ryan Newman	Roush Fenway Racing	Ford	500	36
10	10	48	Jimmie Johnson	Hendrick Motorsports	Chevrolet	500	33
11	1	9	Chase Elliott	Hendrick Motorsports	Chevrolet	500	27
12	21	95	Matt DiBenedetto	Leavine Family Racing	Toyota	500	25
13	13	4	Kevin Harvick	Stewart-Haas Racing	Ford	500	24
14	15	3	Austin Dillon	Richard Childress Racing	Chevrolet	500	25
15	24	13	Ty Dillon	Germain Racing	Chevrolet	500	32
16	2	24	William Byron	Hendrick Motorsports	Chevrolet	500	21
17	23	19	Martin Truex Jr.	Joe Gibbs Racing	Toyota	499	22
18	12	2	Brad Keselowski	Team Penske	Ford	499	34
19	16	42	Kyle Larson	Chip Ganassi Racing	Chevrolet	499	18
20	28	43	Bubba Wallace	Richard Petty Motorsports	Chevrolet	499	17
21	22	38	David Ragan	Front Row Motorsports	Ford	498	16
22	25	37	Chris Buescher	JTG Daugherty Racing	Chevrolet	498	19
23	14	88	Alex Bowman	Hendrick Motorsports	Chevrolet	497	14
24	4	20	Erik Jones	Joe Gibbs Racing	Toyota	497	13
25	30	47	Ryan Preece (R)	JTG Daugherty Racing	Chevrolet	496	12
26	31	00	Landon Cassill	StarCom Racing	Chevrolet	495	11
27	29	36	Matt Tifft (R)	Front Row Motorsports	Ford	494	10
28	18	34	Michael McDowell	Front Row Motorsports	Ford	493	9
29	37	15	Ross Chastain (i)	Premium Motorsports	Chevrolet	491	0
30	26	8	Daniel Hemric (R)	Richard Childress Racing	Chevrolet	490	7
31	34	52	Bayley Currey (i)	Rick Ware Racing	Chevrolet	488	0
32	36	77	Quin Houff	Spire Motorsports	Chevrolet	476	5
33	19	17	Ricky Stenhouse Jr.	Roush Fenway Racing	Ford	395	4
34	32	32	Corey LaJoie	Go Fas Racing	Ford	308	3
35	35	66	Timmy Hill (i)	MBM Motorsports	Toyota	239	0
36	33	51	Gray Gaulding (i)	Petty Ware Racing	Ford	142	0
37	6	10	Aric Almirola	Stewart-Haas Racing	Ford	3	1
Official race results

=== Race statistics ===
- Lead changes: 21 among 9 different drivers
- Cautions/Laps: 11 for 77
- Red flags: 0
- Time of race: 2 hours, 56 minutes and 38 seconds
- Average speed: 90.527 miles per hour (145.689 km/h)

== Media ==
=== Television ===
Fox Sports covered their 19th race at the Bristol Motor Speedway. Mike Joy, five-time Bristol winner Jeff Gordon and 12-time Bristol winner – and all-time Bristol race winner – Darrell Waltrip had the call in the booth for the race. Jamie Little, Regan Smith, Vince Welch and Matt Yocum handled the pit road duties for the television side.

FS1
Booth announcers	Pit reporters
Lap-by-lap: Mike Joy; Color-commentator: Jeff Gordon; Color commentator: Darrell Waltrip	Jamie Little; Regan Smith; Vince Welch; Matt Yocum

=== Radio ===
PRN had the radio call for the race which was also simulcasted on Sirius XM NASCAR Radio. Doug Rice, Mark Garrow and Wendy Venturini called the race in the booth when the field was racing down the frontstretch. Rob Albright called the race from atop the turn 3 suites when the field raced down the backstretch. Brad Gillie, Brett Mcmillan, Jim Noble, and Steve Richards covered the action on pit lane.

PRN
Booth announcers	Turn announcers	Pit reporters
Lead announcer: Doug Rice; Announcer: Mark Garrow; Announcer: Wendy Venturini	Backstretch: Rob Albright	Brad Gillie; Brett McMillan; Jim Noble; Steve Richards

== Standings after the race ==
Drivers' Championship standings

	Pos	Driver	Points
	1	Kyle Busch	361
	2	Denny Hamlin	334 (–27)
1	3	Joey Logano	326 (–35)
1	4	Kevin Harvick	301 (–60)
1	5	Brad Keselowski	271 (–90)
2	6	Ryan Blaney	265 (–96)
	7	Martin Truex Jr.	254 (–107)
2	8	Kurt Busch	253 (–108)
4	9	Aric Almirola	246 (–115)
1	10	Chase Elliott	245 (–116)
	11	Clint Bowyer	234 (–127)
2	12	Daniel Suárez	210 (–151)
2	13	Jimmie Johnson	209 (–152)
2	14	Kyle Larson	203 (–158)
5	15	Ryan Newman	188 (–173)
3	16	Ricky Stenhouse Jr.	187 (–174)
Official driver's standings

Manufacturers' Championship standings

Pos	Manufacturer	Points
1	Toyota	303
2	Ford	291 (–12)
3	Chevrolet	261 (–42)

- Note: Only the first 16 positions are included for the driver standings.
- . – Driver has clinched a position in the Monster Energy NASCAR Cup Series playoffs.

Previous race: 2019 O'Reilly Auto Parts 500	Monster Energy NASCAR Cup Series; 2019 season	Next race: 2019 Toyota Owners 400
