= 2019 Auto Club 400 =

Fifth race of the 2019 Monster Energy Cup Series

Race details
- Race 5 of 36 in the 2019 Monster Energy NASCAR Cup Series
- Track map of the speedway at Auto Club Speedway AKA California Speedway
- Date: March 17, 2019
- Location: Auto Club Speedway in Fontana, California
- Course: Permanent racing facility
- Course length: 3.22 km (2 miles)
- Distance: 200 laps, 400 mi (640 km)
- Average speed: 143.113 miles per hour (230.318 km/h)

Pole position
| Driver | Austin Dillon | Richard Childress Racing |
- Time: 39.982

Most laps led
| Driver | Kyle Busch | Joe Gibbs Racing |
- Laps: 134

Winner
| No. 18 | Kyle Busch | Joe Gibbs Racing |

Television in the United States
- Network: Fox
- Announcers: Mike Joy, Jeff Gordon and Darrell Waltrip
- Nielsen ratings: 4.178 million

Radio in the United States
- Radio: MRN
- Booth announcers: Alex Hayden, Jeff Striegle, and Rusty Wallace
- Turn announcers: Dan Hubbard (1 & 2) and Kurt Becker (3 & 4)

The 2019 Auto Club 400 was a Monster Energy NASCAR Cup Series race that was held on March 17, 2019, at Auto Club Speedway in Fontana, California. Contested over 200 laps on the two-mile (3.2 km) D-shaped oval, it was the fifth race of the 2019 Monster Energy NASCAR Cup Series season. The race was won by Kyle Busch, his 200th win across all three of NASCAR's national divisions.

== Report ==
=== Background ===
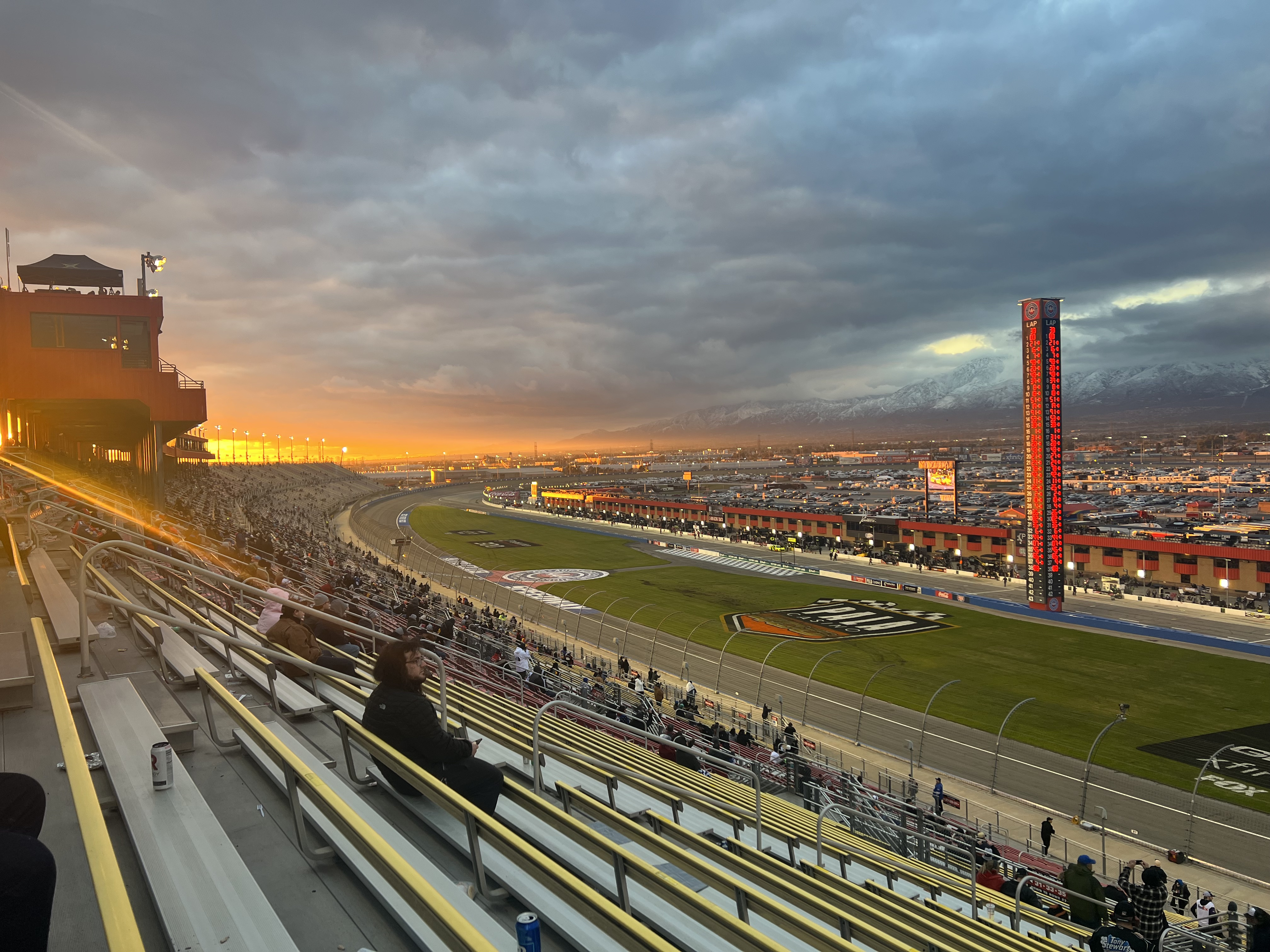
Auto Club Speedway, the track where the race was held.

Auto Club Speedway (previously California Speedway) was a two-mile (3.2 km), low-banked, D-shaped oval superspeedway in Fontana, California which hosted NASCAR racing annually from 1997 to 2023. It was also used for open wheel racing events. The racetrack was located near the former locations of Ontario Motor Speedway and Riverside International Raceway. The track was owned and operated by International Speedway Corporation and was the only track owned by ISC to have its naming rights sold. The speedway was served by the nearby Interstate 10 and Interstate 15 freeways as well as a Metrolink station located behind the backstretch.

==== Entry list ====
| No. | Driver | Team | Manufacturer |
|---|---|---|---|
| 00 | Landon Cassill | StarCom Racing | Chevrolet |
| 1 | Kurt Busch | Chip Ganassi Racing | Chevrolet |
| 2 | Brad Keselowski | Team Penske | Ford |
| 3 | Austin Dillon | Richard Childress Racing | Chevrolet |
| 4 | Kevin Harvick | Stewart-Haas Racing | Ford |
| 6 | Ryan Newman | Roush Fenway Racing | Ford |
| 8 | Daniel Hemric (R) | Richard Childress Racing | Chevrolet |
| 9 | Chase Elliott | Hendrick Motorsports | Chevrolet |
| 10 | Aric Almirola | Stewart-Haas Racing | Ford |
| 11 | Denny Hamlin | Joe Gibbs Racing | Toyota |
| 12 | Ryan Blaney | Team Penske | Ford |
| 13 | Ty Dillon | Germain Racing | Chevrolet |
| 14 | Clint Bowyer | Stewart-Haas Racing | Ford |
| 15 | Ross Chastain (i) | Premium Motorsports | Chevrolet |
| 17 | Ricky Stenhouse Jr. | Roush Fenway Racing | Ford |
| 18 | Kyle Busch | Joe Gibbs Racing | Toyota |
| 19 | Martin Truex Jr. | Joe Gibbs Racing | Toyota |
| 20 | Erik Jones | Joe Gibbs Racing | Toyota |
| 21 | Paul Menard | Wood Brothers Racing | Ford |
| 22 | Joey Logano | Team Penske | Ford |
| 24 | William Byron | Hendrick Motorsports | Chevrolet |
| 27 | Reed Sorenson | Premium Motorsports | Chevrolet |
| 32 | Corey LaJoie | Go Fas Racing | Ford |
| 34 | Michael McDowell | Front Row Motorsports | Ford |
| 36 | Matt Tifft (R) | Front Row Motorsports | Ford |
| 37 | Chris Buescher | JTG Daugherty Racing | Chevrolet |
| 38 | David Ragan | Front Row Motorsports | Ford |
| 41 | Daniel Suárez | Stewart-Haas Racing | Ford |
| 42 | Kyle Larson | Chip Ganassi Racing | Chevrolet |
| 43 | Bubba Wallace | Richard Petty Motorsports | Chevrolet |
| 47 | Ryan Preece (R) | JTG Daugherty Racing | Chevrolet |
| 48 | Jimmie Johnson | Hendrick Motorsports | Chevrolet |
| 51 | Cody Ware (R) | Petty Ware Racing | Chevrolet |
| 52 | B. J. McLeod (i) | Rick Ware Racing | Ford |
| 66 | Joey Gase (i) | MBM Motorsports | Toyota |
| 77 | Garrett Smithley (i) | Spire Motorsports | Chevrolet |
| 88 | Alex Bowman | Hendrick Motorsports | Chevrolet |
| 95 | Matt DiBenedetto | Leavine Family Racing | Toyota |
Official entry list

== First practice ==
Jimmie Johnson was the fastest in the first practice session with a time of 40.137 seconds and a speed of 179.386 mph (288.694 km/h).

| Pos | No. | Driver | Team | Manufacturer | Time | Speed |
|---|---|---|---|---|---|---|
| 1 | 48 | Jimmie Johnson | Hendrick Motorsports | Chevrolet | 40.137 | 179.386 |
| 2 | 3 | Austin Dillon | Richard Childress Racing | Chevrolet | 40.145 | 179.350 |
| 3 | 37 | Chris Buescher | JTG Daugherty Racing | Chevrolet | 40.229 | 178.975 |
Official first practice results

== Qualifying ==
Austin Dillon scored the pole for the race with a time of 39.982 and a speed of 180.081 mph (289.812 km/h) after no drivers completed a lap in the final round of qualifying.

=== Qualifying results ===
| Pos | No. | Driver | Team | Manufacturer | R1 | R2 | R3 |
|---|---|---|---|---|---|---|---|
| 1 | 3 | Austin Dillon | Richard Childress Racing | Chevrolet | 40.011 | 39.982 | 0.000 |
| 2 | 4 | Kevin Harvick | Stewart-Haas Racing | Ford | 40.416 | 40.137 | 0.000 |
| 3 | 10 | Aric Almirola | Stewart-Haas Racing | Ford | 40.122 | 40.205 | 0.000 |
| 4 | 18 | Kyle Busch | Joe Gibbs Racing | Toyota | 40.482 | 40.247 | 0.000 |
| 5 | 22 | Joey Logano | Team Penske | Ford | 40.108 | 40.248 | 0.000 |
| 6 | 11 | Denny Hamlin | Joe Gibbs Racing | Toyota | 40.415 | 40.312 | 0.000 |
| 7 | 6 | Ryan Newman | Roush Fenway Racing | Ford | 40.273 | 40.334 | 0.000 |
| 8 | 9 | Chase Elliott | Hendrick Motorsports | Chevrolet | 40.110 | 40.356 | 0.000 |
| 9 | 14 | Clint Bowyer | Stewart-Haas Racing | Ford | 40.389 | 40.368 | 0.000 |
| 10 | 12 | Ryan Blaney | Team Penske | Ford | 40.117 | 40.378 | 0.000 |
| 11 | 48 | Jimmie Johnson | Hendrick Motorsports | Chevrolet | 40.173 | 40.380 | 0.000 |
| 12 | 17 | Ricky Stenhouse Jr. | Roush Fenway Racing | Ford | 40.516 | 40.405 | 0.000 |
| 13 | 2 | Brad Keselowski | Team Penske | Ford | 40.395 | 40.448 | — |
| 14 | 37 | Chris Buescher | JTG Daugherty Racing | Chevrolet | 40.170 | 40.491 | — |
| 15 | 42 | Kyle Larson | Chip Ganassi Racing | Chevrolet | 40.408 | 40.505 | — |
| 16 | 13 | Ty Dillon | Germain Racing | Chevrolet | 40.518 | 40.523 | — |
| 17 | 8 | Daniel Hemric (R) | Richard Childress Racing | Chevrolet | 40.275 | 40.545 | — |
| 18 | 20 | Erik Jones | Joe Gibbs Racing | Toyota | 40.491 | 40.590 | — |
| 19 | 38 | David Ragan | Front Row Motorsports | Ford | 40.436 | 40.613 | — |
| 20 | 41 | Daniel Suárez | Stewart-Haas Racing | Ford | 40.321 | 40.620 | — |
| 21 | 1 | Kurt Busch | Chip Ganassi Racing | Chevrolet | 40.436 | 40.644 | — |
| 22 | 24 | William Byron | Hendrick Motorsports | Chevrolet | 40.213 | 40.733 | — |
| 23 | 88 | Alex Bowman | Hendrick Motorsports | Chevrolet | 40.502 | 41.141 | — |
| 24 | 95 | Matt DiBenedetto | Leavine Family Racing | Toyota | 40.254 | 41.497 | — |
| 25 | 21 | Paul Menard | Wood Brothers Racing | Ford | 40.534 | — | — |
| 26 | 47 | Ryan Preece (R) | JTG Daugherty Racing | Chevrolet | 40.572 | — | — |
| 27 | 19 | Martin Truex Jr. | Joe Gibbs Racing | Toyota | 40.580 | — | — |
| 28 | 43 | Bubba Wallace | Richard Petty Motorsports | Chevrolet | 40.666 | — | — |
| 29 | 34 | Michael McDowell | Front Row Motorsports | Ford | 40.874 | — | — |
| 30 | 32 | Corey LaJoie | Go Fas Racing | Ford | 40.941 | — | — |
| 31 | 15 | Ross Chastain (i) | Premium Motorsports | Chevrolet | 41.158 | — | — |
| 32 | 36 | Matt Tifft (R) | Front Row Motorsports | Ford | 41.184 | — | — |
| 33 | 00 | Landon Cassill | StarCom Racing | Chevrolet | 41.400 | — | — |
| 34 | 51 | Cody Ware (R) | Petty Ware Racing | Chevrolet | 41.745 | — | — |
| 35 | 27 | Reed Sorenson | Premium Motorsports | Chevrolet | 42.442 | — | — |
| 36 | 52 | B. J. McLeod (i) | Rick Ware Racing | Ford | 42.755 | — | — |
| 37 | 77 | Garrett Smithley (i) | Spire Motorsports | Chevrolet | 42.806 | — | — |
| 38 | 66 | Joey Gase (i) | MBM Motorsports | Toyota | 43.519 | — | — |
Official qualifying results

== Practice (post-qualifying) ==
=== Second practice ===
Kevin Harvick was the fastest in the second practice session with a time of 40.940 seconds and a speed of 175.867 mph (283.031 km/h).

| Pos | No. | Driver | Team | Manufacturer | Time | Speed |
|---|---|---|---|---|---|---|
| 1 | 4 | Kevin Harvick | Stewart-Haas Racing | Ford | 40.940 | 175.867 |
| 2 | 18 | Kyle Busch | Joe Gibbs Racing | Toyota | 40.962 | 175.773 |
| 3 | 2 | Brad Keselowski | Team Penske | Ford | 40.992 | 175.644 |
Official second practice results

=== Final practice ===
Brad Keselowski was the fastest in the final practice session with a time of 40.759 seconds and a speed of 176.648 mph (284.287 km/h).

| Pos | No. | Driver | Team | Manufacturer | Time | Speed |
|---|---|---|---|---|---|---|
| 1 | 2 | Brad Keselowski | Team Penske | Ford | 40.759 | 176.648 |
| 2 | 8 | Daniel Hemric (R) | Richard Childress Racing | Chevrolet | 40.782 | 176.548 |
| 3 | 41 | Daniel Suárez | Stewart-Haas Racing | Ford | 40.841 | 176.293 |
Official final practice results

== Race ==
=== Stage Results ===
Stage One Laps: 60

| Pos | No | Driver | Team | Manufacturer | Points |
|---|---|---|---|---|---|
| 1 | 18 | Kyle Busch | Joe Gibbs Racing | Toyota | 10 |
| 2 | 22 | Joey Logano | Team Penske | Ford | 9 |
| 3 | 11 | Denny Hamlin | Joe Gibbs Racing | Toyota | 8 |
| 4 | 4 | Kevin Harvick | Stewart-Haas Racing | Ford | 7 |
| 5 | 10 | Aric Almirola | Stewart-Haas Racing | Ford | 6 |
| 6 | 20 | Erik Jones | Joe Gibbs Racing | Toyota | 5 |
| 7 | 41 | Daniel Suárez | Stewart-Haas Racing | Ford | 4 |
| 8 | 48 | Jimmie Johnson | Hendrick Motorsports | Chevrolet | 3 |
| 9 | 12 | Ryan Blaney | Team Penske | Ford | 2 |
| 10 | 8 | Daniel Hemric (R) | Richard Childress Racing | Chevrolet | 1 |
Official stage one results

Stage Two Laps: 60

| Pos | No | Driver | Team | Manufacturer | Points |
|---|---|---|---|---|---|
| 1 | 18 | Kyle Busch | Joe Gibbs Racing | Toyota | 10 |
| 2 | 2 | Brad Keselowski | Team Penske | Ford | 9 |
| 3 | 12 | Ryan Blaney | Team Penske | Ford | 8 |
| 4 | 22 | Joey Logano | Team Penske | Ford | 7 |
| 5 | 10 | Aric Almirola | Stewart-Haas Racing | Ford | 6 |
| 6 | 4 | Kevin Harvick | Stewart-Haas Racing | Ford | 5 |
| 7 | 20 | Erik Jones | Joe Gibbs Racing | Toyota | 4 |
| 8 | 1 | Kurt Busch | Chip Ganassi Racing | Chevrolet | 3 |
| 9 | 11 | Denny Hamlin | Joe Gibbs Racing | Toyota | 2 |
| 10 | 9 | Chase Elliott | Hendrick Motorsports | Chevrolet | 1 |
Official stage two results

=== Final Stage Results ===
Stage Three Laps: 80

| Pos | Grid | No | Driver | Team | Manufacturer | Laps | Points |
|---|---|---|---|---|---|---|---|
| 1 | 4 | 18 | Kyle Busch | Joe Gibbs Racing | Toyota | 200 | 60 |
| 2 | 5 | 22 | Joey Logano | Team Penske | Ford | 200 | 51 |
| 3 | 13 | 2 | Brad Keselowski | Team Penske | Ford | 200 | 43 |
| 4 | 2 | 4 | Kevin Harvick | Stewart-Haas Racing | Ford | 200 | 45 |
| 5 | 10 | 12 | Ryan Blaney | Team Penske | Ford | 200 | 42 |
| 6 | 21 | 1 | Kurt Busch | Chip Ganassi Racing | Chevrolet | 200 | 34 |
| 7 | 6 | 11 | Denny Hamlin | Joe Gibbs Racing | Toyota | 200 | 40 |
| 8 | 27 | 19 | Martin Truex Jr. | Joe Gibbs Racing | Toyota | 200 | 29 |
| 9 | 3 | 10 | Aric Almirola | Stewart-Haas Racing | Ford | 200 | 40 |
| 10 | 1 | 3 | Austin Dillon | Richard Childress Racing | Chevrolet | 200 | 27 |
| 11 | 8 | 9 | Chase Elliott | Hendrick Motorsports | Chevrolet | 200 | 27 |
| 12 | 15 | 42 | Kyle Larson | Chip Ganassi Racing | Chevrolet | 200 | 25 |
| 13 | 20 | 41 | Daniel Suárez | Stewart-Haas Racing | Ford | 200 | 28 |
| 14 | 12 | 17 | Ricky Stenhouse Jr. | Roush Fenway Racing | Ford | 200 | 23 |
| 15 | 22 | 24 | William Byron | Hendrick Motorsports | Chevrolet | 200 | 22 |
| 16 | 14 | 37 | Chris Buescher | JTG Daugherty Racing | Chevrolet | 200 | 21 |
| 17 | 11 | 48 | Jimmie Johnson | Hendrick Motorsports | Chevrolet | 200 | 23 |
| 18 | 24 | 95 | Matt DiBenedetto | Leavine Family Racing | Toyota | 200 | 19 |
| 19 | 18 | 20 | Erik Jones | Joe Gibbs Racing | Toyota | 200 | 27 |
| 20 | 25 | 21 | Paul Menard | Wood Brothers Racing | Ford | 200 | 17 |
| 21 | 23 | 88 | Alex Bowman | Hendrick Motorsports | Chevrolet | 200 | 16 |
| 22 | 7 | 6 | Ryan Newman | Roush Fenway Racing | Ford | 199 | 15 |
| 23 | 26 | 47 | Ryan Preece (R) | JTG Daugherty Racing | Chevrolet | 199 | 14 |
| 24 | 29 | 34 | Michael McDowell | Front Row Motorsports | Ford | 198 | 13 |
| 25 | 19 | 38 | David Ragan | Front Row Motorsports | Ford | 198 | 12 |
| 26 | 32 | 36 | Matt Tifft (R) | Front Row Motorsports | Ford | 197 | 11 |
| 27 | 16 | 13 | Ty Dillon | Germain Racing | Chevrolet | 197 | 10 |
| 28 | 31 | 15 | Ross Chastain (i) | Premium Motorsports | Chevrolet | 195 | 0 |
| 29 | 33 | 00 | Landon Cassill | StarCom Racing | Chevrolet | 195 | 8 |
| 30 | 28 | 43 | Bubba Wallace | Richard Petty Motorsports | Chevrolet | 194 | 7 |
| 31 | 30 | 32 | Corey LaJoie | Go Fas Racing | Ford | 193 | 6 |
| 32 | 34 | 51 | Cody Ware (R) | Petty Ware Racing | Chevrolet | 192 | 5 |
| 33 | 17 | 8 | Daniel Hemric (R) | Richard Childress Racing | Chevrolet | 192 | 5 |
| 34 | 35 | 27 | Reed Sorenson | Premium Motorsports | Chevrolet | 192 | 3 |
| 35 | 38 | 66 | Joey Gase (i) | MBM Motorsports | Toyota | 188 | 0 |
| 36 | 37 | 77 | Garrett Smithley (i) | Spire Motorsports | Chevrolet | 188 | 0 |
| 37 | 36 | 52 | B. J. McLeod (i) | Rick Ware Racing | Ford | 172 | 0 |
| 38 | 9 | 14 | Clint Bowyer | Stewart-Haas Racing | Ford | 130 | 1 |
Official race results

=== Race statistics ===
- Lead changes: 18 among 9 different drivers
- Cautions/Laps: 4 for 22
- Red flags: 0
- Time of race: 2 hours, 47 minutes and 42 seconds
- Average speed: 143.113 miles per hour (230.318 km/h)

== Media ==
=== Television ===
The race was the 19th race Fox Sports covered at the Auto Club Speedway. Mike Joy, three-time Auto Club winner Jeff Gordon and Darrell Waltrip called the race in the booth for Fox. Jamie Little, Vince Welch and Matt Yocum handled the pit road duties for the television side.

Fox
| Booth announcers | Pit reporters |
|---|---|
| Lap-by-lap: Mike Joy; Color-commentator: Jeff Gordon; Color commentator: Darrell Waltrip | Jamie Little; Vince Welch; Matt Yocum |

=== Radio ===
MRN had the radio call for the race which was also simulcasted on Sirius XM NASCAR Radio. Alex Hayden, Jeff Striegle and 2001 race winner Rusty Wallace called the race from the booth when the field raced their way down the front stretch. Kyle Rickey called the race from a billboard outside turn 2 when the field raced their way through turns 1 and 2 & Dan Hubbard called the race from a billboard outside turn 3 when the field raced their way through turns 3 and 4. Winston Kelley, Steve Post and Dillon Welch had the pit road duties for MRN.

MRN
| Booth announcers | Turn announcers | Pit reporters |
|---|---|---|
| Lead announcer: Alex Hayden; Announcer: Jeff Striegle; Announcer: Rusty Wallace | Turns 1 & 2: Kyle Rickey; Turns 3 & 4: Dan Hubbard | Winston Kelley; Steve Post; Dillon Welch |

== Standings after the race ==
Drivers' Championship standings

| | Pos | Driver | Points |
|---|---|---|---|
| | 1 | Kyle Busch | 237 |
| | 2 | Joey Logano | 222 (–15) |
| | 3 | Kevin Harvick | 213 (–24) |
| | 4 | Denny Hamlin | 205 (–32) |
| 3 | 5 | Brad Keselowski | 176 (–61) |
| 1 | 6 | Aric Almirola | 174 (–63) |
| 2 | 7 | Martin Truex Jr. | 169 (–68) |
| 2 | 8 | Kyle Larson | 163 (–74) |
| | 9 | Kurt Busch | 160 (–77) |
| 2 | 10 | Ryan Blaney | 155 (–82) |
| 1 | 11 | Ricky Stenhouse Jr. | 146 (–91) |
| 1 | 12 | Chase Elliott | 135 (–102) |
| 1 | 13 | Erik Jones | 133 (–104) |
| 1 | 14 | Jimmie Johnson | 121 (–116) |
| 4 | 15 | Clint Bowyer | 119 (–118) |
| | 16 | Alex Bowman | 110 (–127) |
Official driver's standings

Manufacturers' Championship standings

| Pos | Manufacturer | Points |
|---|---|---|
| 1 | Toyota | 189 |
| 2 | Ford | 182 (–7) |
| 3 | Chevrolet | 159 (–30) |

- Note: Only the first 16 positions are included for the driver standings.

| Previous race: 2019 TicketGuardian 500 | Monster Energy NASCAR Cup Series; 2019 season | Next race: 2019 STP 500 |
