= 2020 NASCAR Cup Series =

American motorsport season

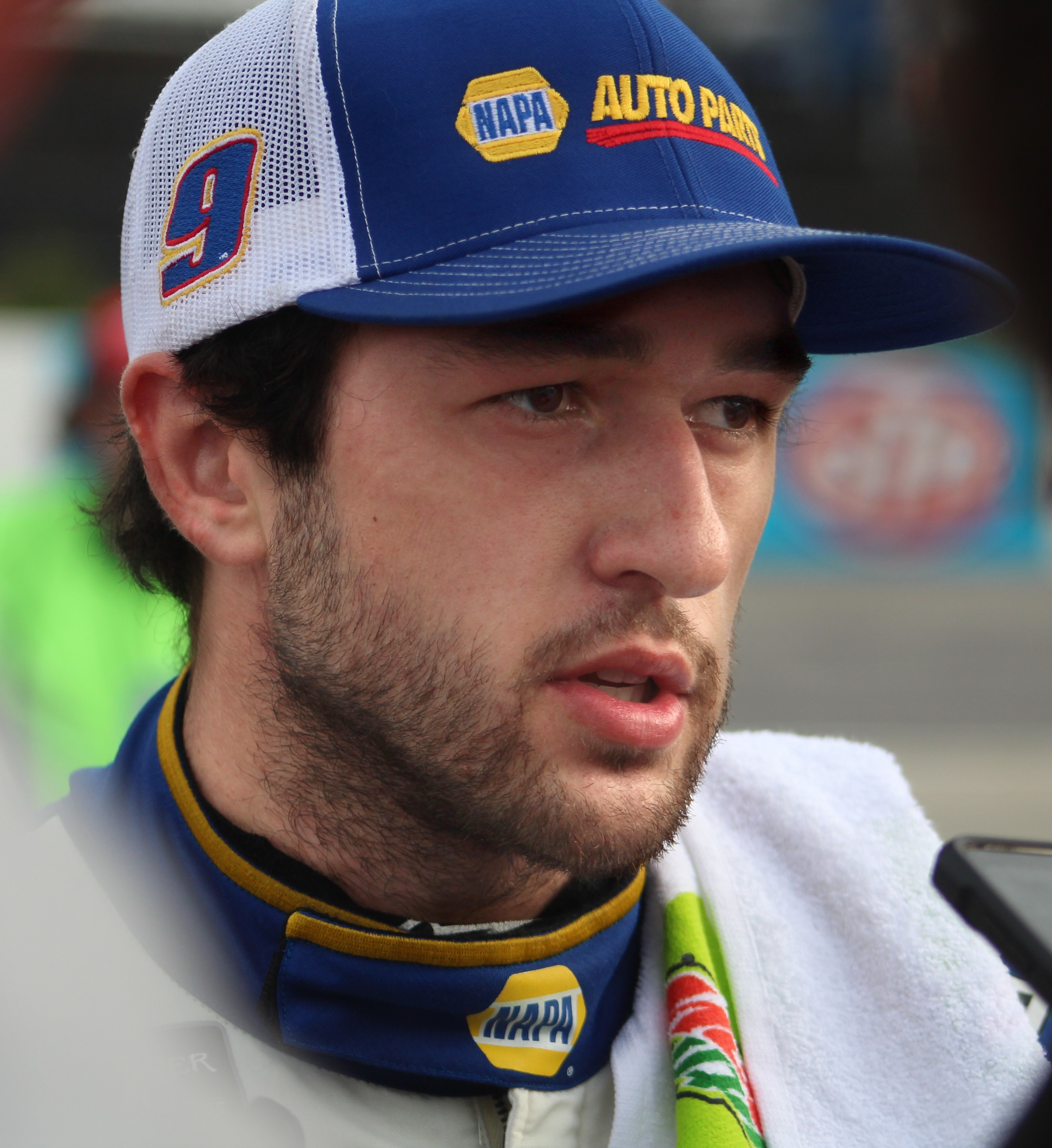
Chase Elliott, the 2020 NASCAR Cup Series champion

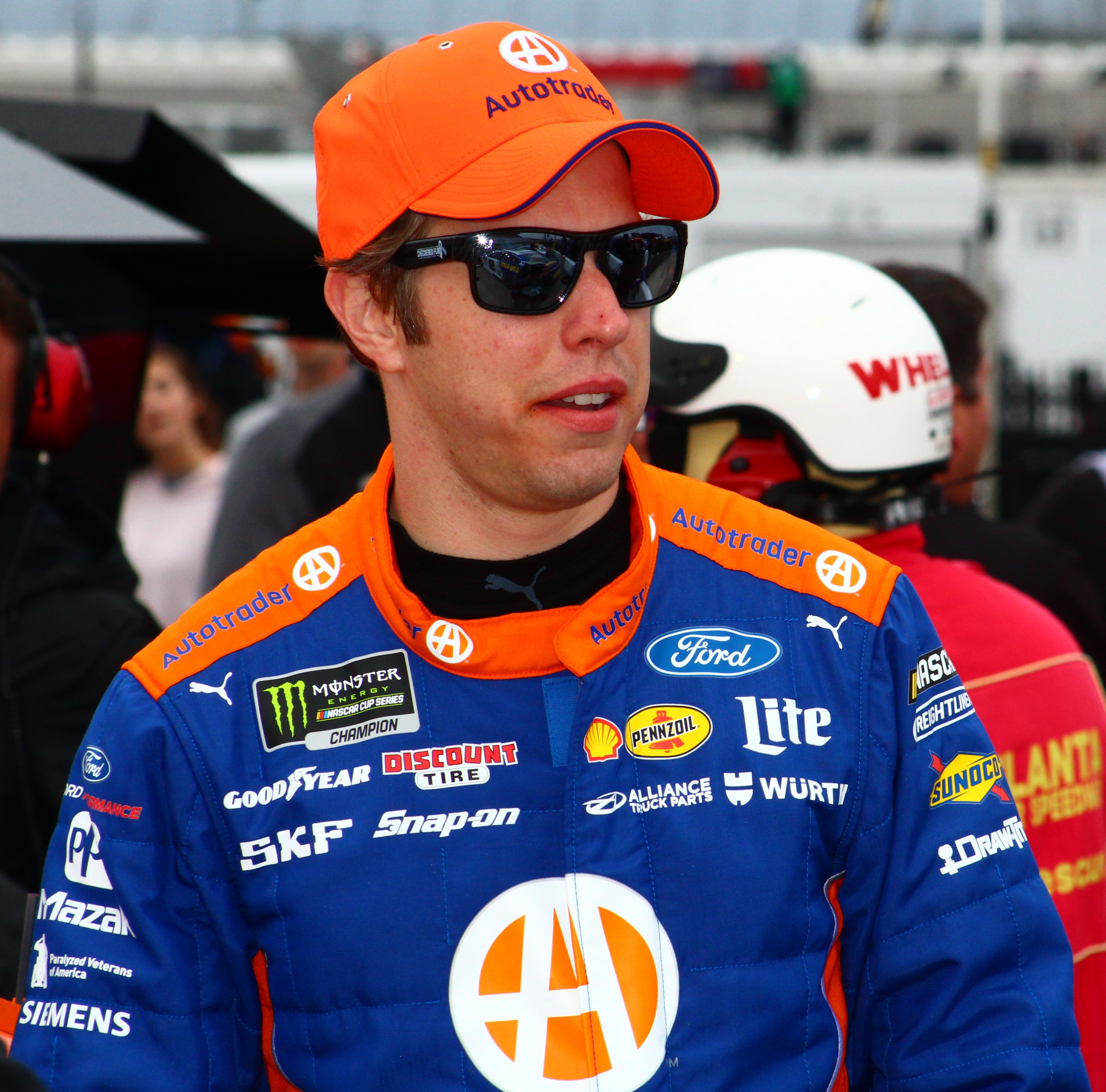
Brad Keselowski, finished second behind Elliott in the championship.

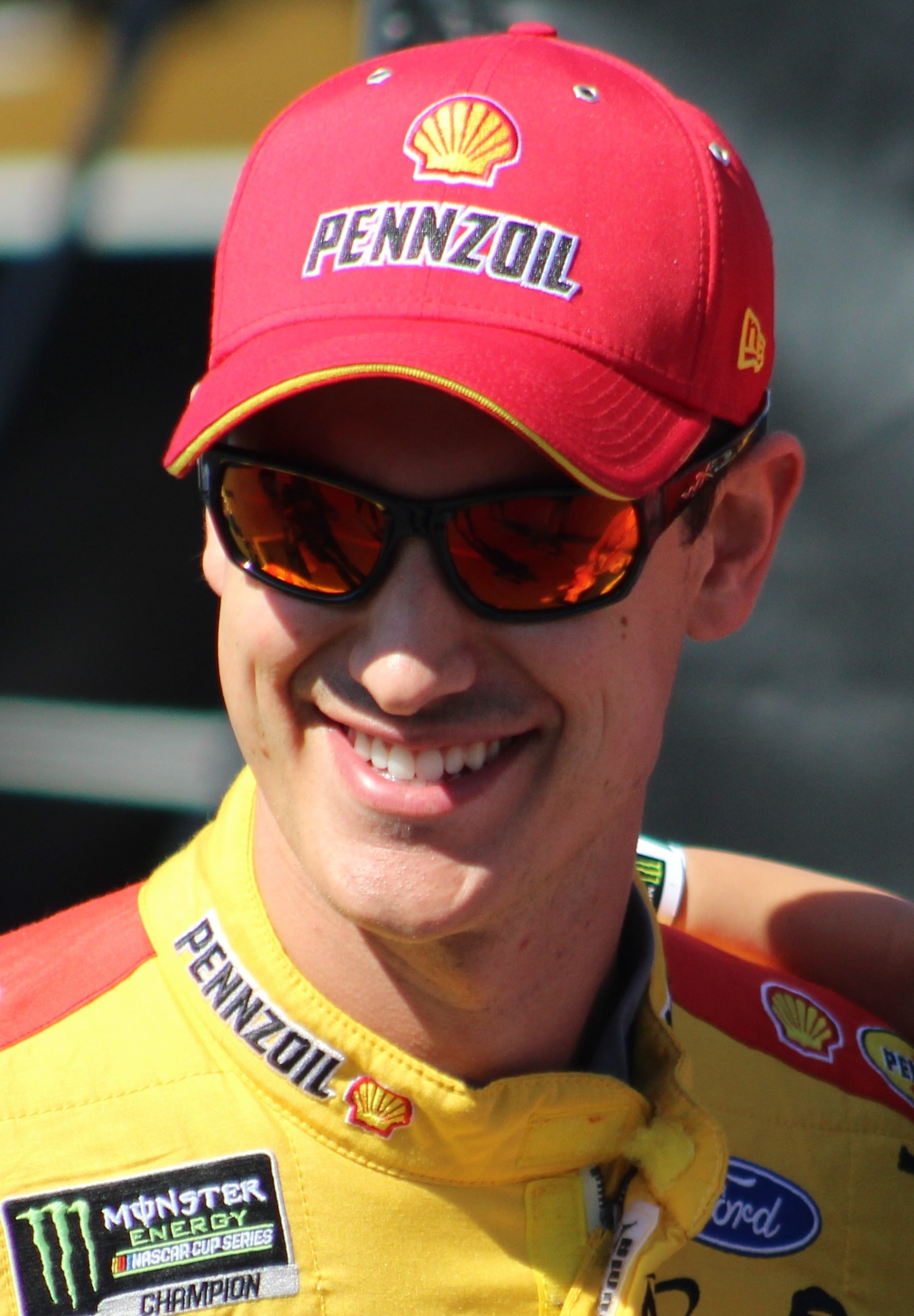
Joey Logano, finished third in the championship.

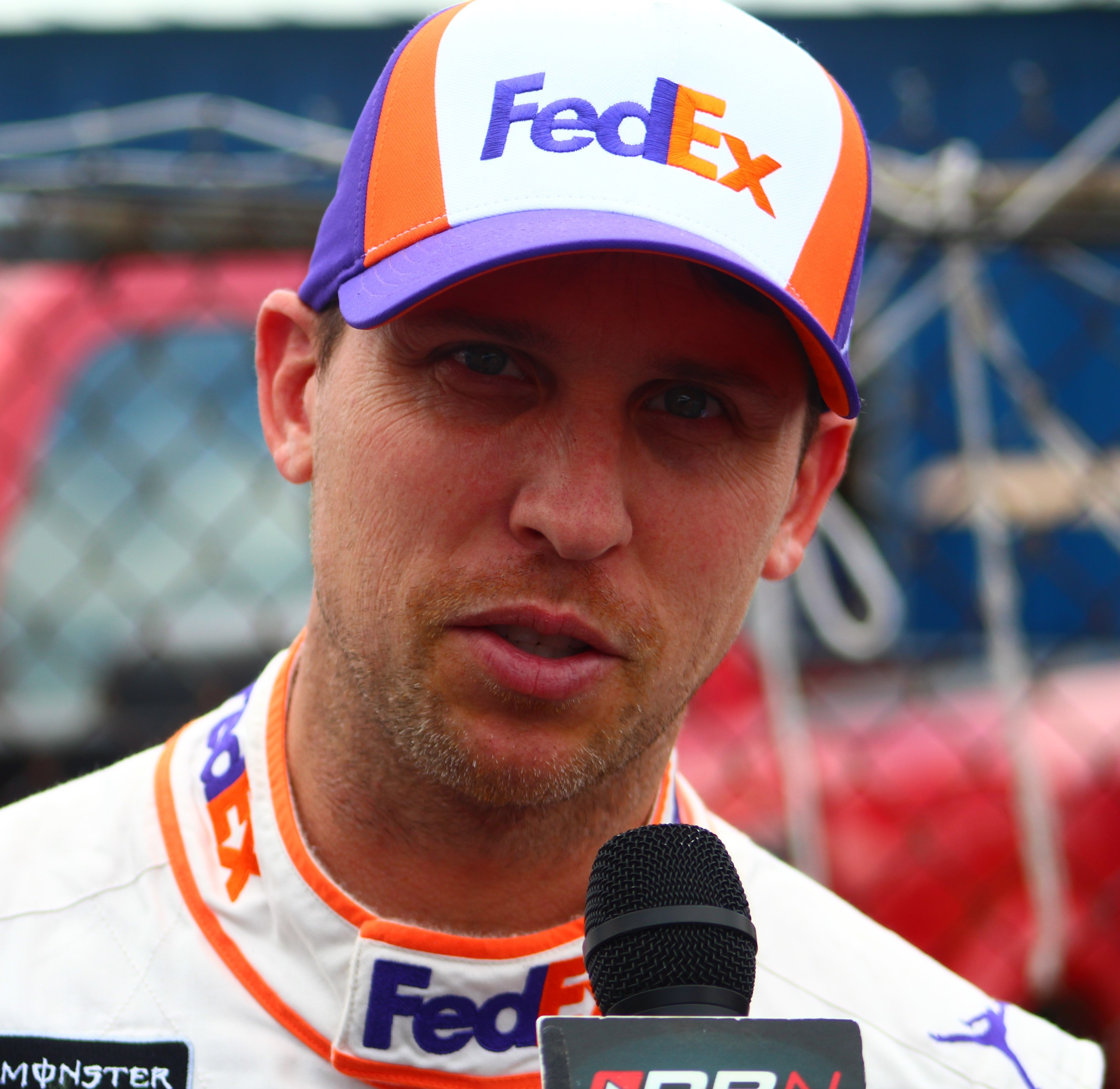
Denny Hamlin, finished fourth in the championship.

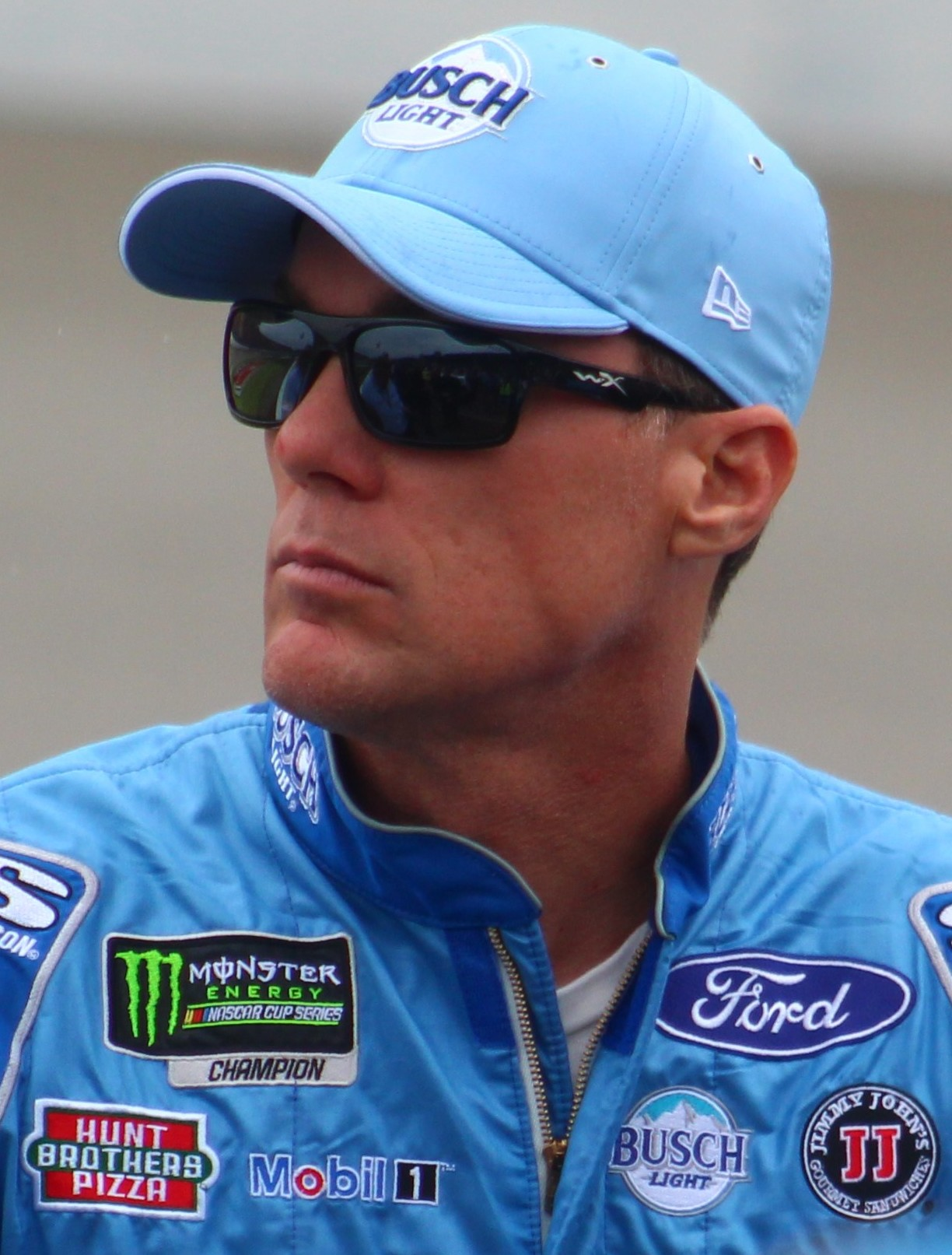
Kevin Harvick won the Regular Season Championship, but finished fifth in the playoffs.

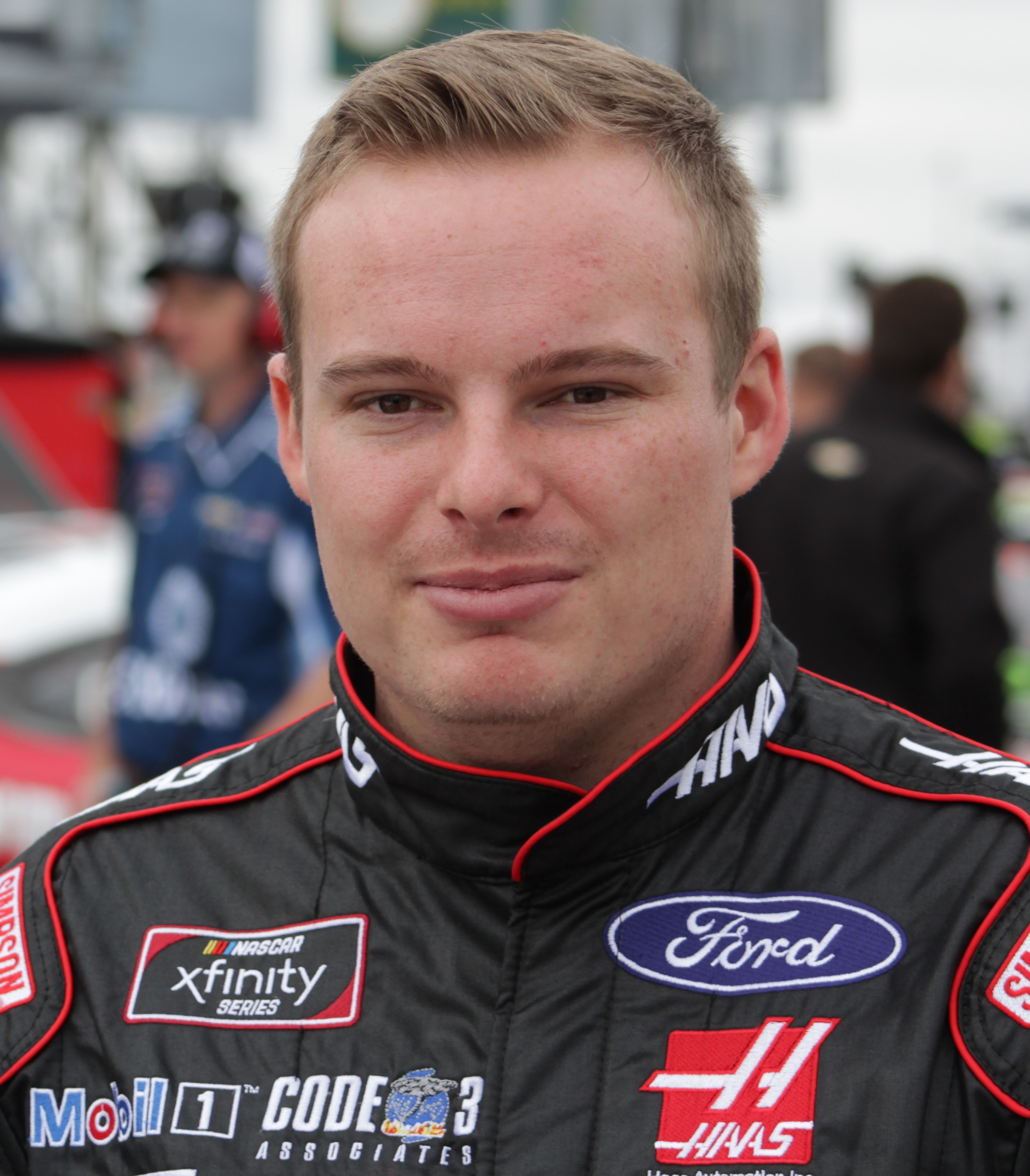
Cole Custer, the 2020 NASCAR Rookie of the Year

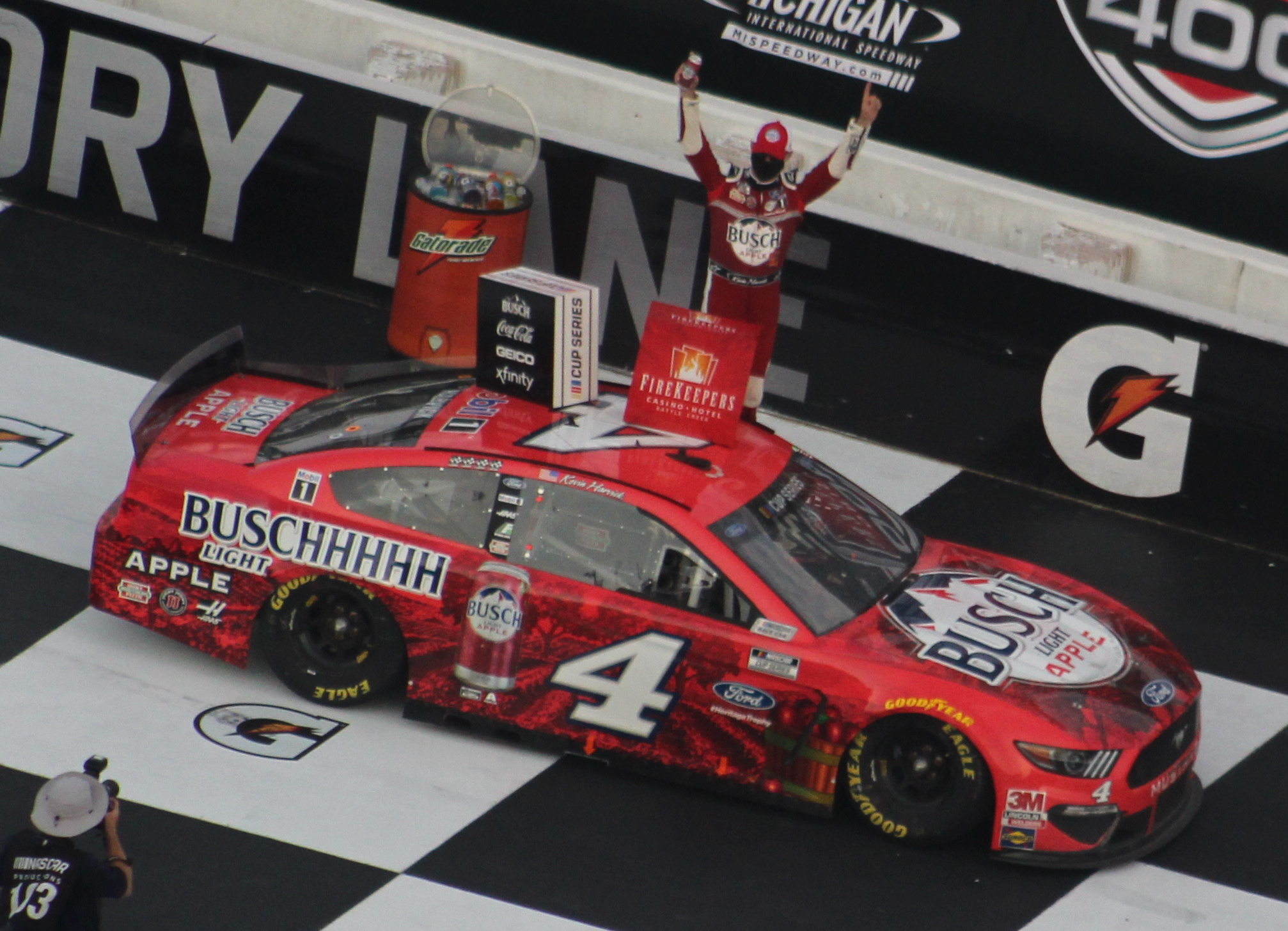
Ford won the manufacturers' championship with 1329 points and 18 wins.

The 2020 NASCAR Cup Series was the 72nd season for NASCAR professional stock car racing in the United States and the 49th season for the modern era Cup Series. The season began at Daytona International Speedway with the Busch Clash, the Bluegreen Vacations Duel qualifying races, and the 62nd running of the Daytona 500. The regular season ended with the Coke Zero Sugar 400 at Daytona on August 29. The NASCAR playoffs ended with the Season Finale 500, the first finale at Phoenix Raceway on November 8.

Before the season's restart at Darlington, Kyle Larson used a racial slur during an iRacing event that got him fired from Chip Ganassi Racing, making him miss the playoffs for the first time since 2015. Following the second Drydene 311 at Dover International Speedway, Kevin Harvick, driving for Stewart–Haas Racing, clinched the Regular Season Championship. Chase Elliott, driving for Hendrick Motorsports, won the 2020 Cup Series Championship following the Season Finale 500 at Phoenix Raceway. William Byron of Hendrick Motorsports and Cole Custer of SHR each won their first race in the Cup Series, and by virtue of making the playoffs, Custer also won the Rookie of the Year honors. Ford won the Manufacturers' Championship following the Xfinity 500 at Martinsville Speedway. This was also the final season for two Cup Series champions: 2003 series champion Matt Kenseth and, most notably, seven-time Cup Series champion Jimmie Johnson; the latter returned to NASCAR on a part-time basis starting from 2023.

== Background ==
This was the first season under NASCAR's new tiered sponsorship model after rejecting Monster Energy's offer to extend its title sponsorship. On December 5, 2019, NASCAR announced Busch Beer, Coca-Cola, GEICO, and Xfinity as the Premier Partners of the NASCAR Cup Series, replacing the sole title sponsor of Monster Energy.

This season was scheduled to be the final year for the Gen-6 car, with the Next Gen car (formerly the Gen-7 car) debuting in 2021. However, when the COVID-19 pandemic postponed all NASCAR racing (and therefore, testing) until the month of May, the sanctioning body announced that the debut of the car would be pushed back a year to 2022.

It was announced that 2020 was the last full-time season for seven-time series champion Jimmie Johnson and Clint Bowyer, as well as for part-time driver Brendan Gaughan. David Ragan, who retired from racing in NASCAR full-time after 2019, returned this season for the Daytona 500 in the Cup Series (driving for Rick Ware Racing in a partnership with his former team, Front Row Motorsports), as well as in a few Truck Series races (driving for DGR-Crosley). 2020 was also the last season for Germain Racing, after long-time sponsor GEICO announced they would leave the team at the conclusion of the season, and for Bob Leavine's family owned Leavine Family Racing team, as his team experienced enough financial problems during the COVID-19 pandemic that he had to close the team down and sell its assets. A buyer was found on August 4.

When the season was put on hold due to the coronavirus, drivers from all NASCAR series, including nearly all Cup Series drivers, participated in the inaugural eNASCAR iRacing Pro Invitational Series.

== Teams and drivers ==
=== Chartered teams ===
Manufacturer	Team	No.	Race driver	Crew chief
Chevrolet	Chip Ganassi Racing	1	Kurt Busch	Matt McCall
Chevrolet	Chip Ganassi Racing	42	Kyle Larson 4	Chad Johnston 20; Phil Surgen 16
Chevrolet	Chip Ganassi Racing	42	Matt Kenseth 32	Chad Johnston 20; Phil Surgen 16
Chevrolet	Germain Racing	13	Ty Dillon	Matt Borland
Chevrolet	Hendrick Motorsports	9	Chase Elliott	Alan Gustafson
Chevrolet	Hendrick Motorsports	24	William Byron	Chad Knaus 35; Keith Rodden 1
Chevrolet	Hendrick Motorsports	48	Jimmie Johnson 35	Cliff Daniels
Chevrolet	Hendrick Motorsports	48	Justin Allgaier 1	Cliff Daniels
Chevrolet	Hendrick Motorsports	88	Alex Bowman	Greg Ives
Chevrolet	JTG Daugherty Racing	37	Ryan Preece	Trent Owens 35; Brian Burns 1
Chevrolet	JTG Daugherty Racing	47	Ricky Stenhouse Jr.	Brian Pattie 35; Eddie Pardue 1
Chevrolet	Premium Motorsports	15	Brennan Poole (R) 35	Pat Tryson
Chevrolet	Premium Motorsports	15	J. J. Yeley 1	Pat Tryson
Chevrolet	Richard Childress Racing	3	Austin Dillon 35	Justin Alexander
Chevrolet	Richard Childress Racing	3	Kaz Grala 1	Justin Alexander
Chevrolet	Richard Childress Racing	8	Tyler Reddick (R)	Randall Burnett
Chevrolet	Richard Petty Motorsports	43	Bubba Wallace	Jerry Baxter 35; Joey Forgette 1
Chevrolet	Spire Motorsports	77	Ross Chastain 5 (Note: Chastain's first two entries (the Daytona 500 and Coca-Cola 600) were fielded in a collaboration with Chip Ganassi Racing.)	Tommy Baldwin Jr. 1 Peter Sospenzo 33; Jim Pohlman 1 Thomas Tucker 1
Chevrolet	Spire Motorsports	77	Reed Sorenson 12	Tommy Baldwin Jr. 1 Peter Sospenzo 33; Jim Pohlman 1 Thomas Tucker 1
Chevrolet	Spire Motorsports	77	J. J. Yeley 6 (Note: Entries were fielded in a collaboration with Rick Ware Racing.)	Tommy Baldwin Jr. 1 Peter Sospenzo 33; Jim Pohlman 1 Thomas Tucker 1
Chevrolet	Spire Motorsports	77	Garrett Smithley 5	Tommy Baldwin Jr. 1 Peter Sospenzo 33; Jim Pohlman 1 Thomas Tucker 1
Chevrolet	Spire Motorsports	77	B. J. McLeod 2	Tommy Baldwin Jr. 1 Peter Sospenzo 33; Jim Pohlman 1 Thomas Tucker 1
Chevrolet	Spire Motorsports	77	James Davison 2 (Note: Entries were fielded in a collaboration with Jonathan Byrd's Racing and Hayward Motorsports.)	Tommy Baldwin Jr. 1 Peter Sospenzo 33; Jim Pohlman 1 Thomas Tucker 1
Chevrolet	Spire Motorsports	77	Josh Bilicki 2	Tommy Baldwin Jr. 1 Peter Sospenzo 33; Jim Pohlman 1 Thomas Tucker 1
Chevrolet	Spire Motorsports	77	Stanton Barrett 1	Tommy Baldwin Jr. 1 Peter Sospenzo 33; Jim Pohlman 1 Thomas Tucker 1
Chevrolet	Spire Motorsports	77	Justin Haley 1	Tommy Baldwin Jr. 1 Peter Sospenzo 33; Jim Pohlman 1 Thomas Tucker 1
Chevrolet	StarCom Racing	00	Quin Houff (R)	George Church
Ford	Front Row Motorsports	34	Michael McDowell	Drew Blickensderfer
Ford	Front Row Motorsports	38	John Hunter Nemechek (R)	Seth Barbour
Ford	Go Fas Racing	32	Corey LaJoie	Ryan Sparks 35; Roy Gangdal 1
Ford	Roush Fenway Racing	6	Ryan Newman 33	Scott Graves
Ford	Roush Fenway Racing	6	Ross Chastain 3	Scott Graves
Ford	Roush Fenway Racing	17	Chris Buescher	Luke Lambert
Ford	Stewart–Haas Racing	4	Kevin Harvick	Rodney Childers
Ford	Stewart–Haas Racing	10	Aric Almirola	Mike Bugarewicz
Ford	Stewart–Haas Racing	14	Clint Bowyer	Johnny Klausmeier 34; Greg Zipadelli 2
Ford	Stewart–Haas Racing	41	Cole Custer (R)	Mike Shiplett
Ford	Team Penske	2	Brad Keselowski	Jeremy Bullins
Ford	Team Penske	12	Ryan Blaney	Todd Gordon 35; Travis Geisler 1
Ford	Team Penske	22	Joey Logano	Paul Wolfe
Ford	Wood Brothers Racing	21	Matt DiBenedetto	Greg Erwin
Toyota	Joe Gibbs Racing	11	Denny Hamlin	Chris Gabehart 32; Sam McAulay 4
Toyota	Joe Gibbs Racing	18	Kyle Busch	Adam Stevens 35; Jacob Canter 1
Toyota	Joe Gibbs Racing	19	Martin Truex Jr.	James Small 35; Blake Harris 1
Toyota	Joe Gibbs Racing	20	Erik Jones	Chris Gayle 35; Seth Chavka 1
Toyota	Leavine Family Racing	95	Christopher Bell (R)	Jason Ratcliff
Chevrolet 7 Ford 29	Petty Ware Racing (Note: The No. 51 car is officially listed on paper as Petty Ware Racing because they have a long-term partnership with Richard Petty Motorsports to use one of the charters they own. However, RPM is not involved with operating or helping this team out at the races in any way.)	51	Joey Gase 28	Lee Leslie 8 Jason Houghtaling 20; Tommy Baldwin Jr. 1 Jason Miller 2 Todd Parrott 3 Mike Hillman Sr. 2
Chevrolet 7 Ford 29	Petty Ware Racing	51	Garrett Smithley 3	Lee Leslie 8 Jason Houghtaling 20; Tommy Baldwin Jr. 1 Jason Miller 2 Todd Parrott 3 Mike Hillman Sr. 2
Chevrolet 7 Ford 29	Petty Ware Racing	51	James Davison (R) 4	Lee Leslie 8 Jason Houghtaling 20; Tommy Baldwin Jr. 1 Jason Miller 2 Todd Parrott 3 Mike Hillman Sr. 2
Chevrolet 7 Ford 29	Petty Ware Racing	51	Josh Bilicki (R) 1	Lee Leslie 8 Jason Houghtaling 20; Tommy Baldwin Jr. 1 Jason Miller 2 Todd Parrott 3 Mike Hillman Sr. 2
Ford 31 Chevrolet 5	Rick Ware Racing	27	B. J. McLeod 1	Jason Houghtaling
Ford 31 Chevrolet 5	Rick Ware Racing	27	J. J. Yeley 24	Mike Hillman Sr. 33; Todd Parrott 2
Ford 31 Chevrolet 5	Rick Ware Racing	27	Gray Gaulding 9	Mike Hillman Sr. 33; Todd Parrott 2
Ford 31 Chevrolet 5	Rick Ware Racing	27	Josh Bilicki 1	Mike Hillman Sr. 33; Todd Parrott 2
Ford 31 Chevrolet 5	Rick Ware Racing	27	Cody Ware 1	Mike Hillman Sr. 33; Todd Parrott 2
Ford 12 Chevrolet 24	Rick Ware Racing	53	David Ragan 1	Derrick Finley 1 Lee Leslie 5 Jason Houghtaling 15; Todd Parrott 14; Ken Evans 1
Ford 12 Chevrolet 24	Rick Ware Racing	53	Joey Gase 4	Derrick Finley 1 Lee Leslie 5 Jason Houghtaling 15; Todd Parrott 14; Ken Evans 1
Ford 12 Chevrolet 24	Rick Ware Racing	53	Garrett Smithley 13	Derrick Finley 1 Lee Leslie 5 Jason Houghtaling 15; Todd Parrott 14; Ken Evans 1
Ford 12 Chevrolet 24	Rick Ware Racing	53	Bayley Currey 1	Derrick Finley 1 Lee Leslie 5 Jason Houghtaling 15; Todd Parrott 14; Ken Evans 1
Ford 12 Chevrolet 24	Rick Ware Racing	53	David Starr 1	Derrick Finley 1 Lee Leslie 5 Jason Houghtaling 15; Todd Parrott 14; Ken Evans 1
Ford 12 Chevrolet 24	Rick Ware Racing	53	Josh Bilicki 6	Derrick Finley 1 Lee Leslie 5 Jason Houghtaling 15; Todd Parrott 14; Ken Evans 1
Ford 12 Chevrolet 24	Rick Ware Racing	53	J. J. Yeley 1	Derrick Finley 1 Lee Leslie 5 Jason Houghtaling 15; Todd Parrott 14; Ken Evans 1
Ford 12 Chevrolet 24	Rick Ware Racing	53	James Davison 9	Derrick Finley 1 Lee Leslie 5 Jason Houghtaling 15; Todd Parrott 14; Ken Evans 1

=== Non-chartered teams ===
==== Complete schedule ====
Manufacturer	Team	No.	Race driver	Crew chief
Toyota	Gaunt Brothers Racing	96	Daniel Suárez	Dave Winston
Ford 2 Toyota 34	MBM Motorsports	66	Timmy Hill (Note: Entry at Talladega was fielded in a collaboration with Go Fas Racing)	Steve Idol 4 Clinton Cram 32

==== Limited schedule ====
Manufacturer	Team	No.	Race driver	Crew chief	Rounds
Chevrolet	Beard Motorsports	62	Brendan Gaughan	Darren Shaw	5
Chevrolet	Kaulig Racing	16	Justin Haley	Billy Scott	1
Chevrolet	Premium Motorsports	27	Reed Sorenson	Peter Sospenzo	1
Chevrolet	Tommy Baldwin Racing	7	Josh Bilicki	Tommy Baldwin Jr. 18; Peter Sospenzo 1 Patrick Donahue 3	12
Chevrolet	Tommy Baldwin Racing	7	J. J. Yeley	Tommy Baldwin Jr. 18; Peter Sospenzo 1 Patrick Donahue 3	2
Chevrolet	Tommy Baldwin Racing	7	Reed Sorenson	Tommy Baldwin Jr. 18; Peter Sospenzo 1 Patrick Donahue 3	4
Chevrolet	Tommy Baldwin Racing	7	Joey Gase	Tommy Baldwin Jr. 18; Peter Sospenzo 1 Patrick Donahue 3	1
Chevrolet	Tommy Baldwin Racing	7	Garrett Smithley	Tommy Baldwin Jr. 18; Peter Sospenzo 1 Patrick Donahue 3	3
Ford	Rick Ware Racing	54	J. J. Yeley	Mike Hillman Sr.	1
Toyota	MBM Motorsports	49	Chad Finchum	Doug Richert 1 Ryan Bell 3	4
Chevrolet 12 Ford 3	B. J. McLeod Motorsports	78	B. J. McLeod	Todd Parrott 10; Ken Evans 5	13
Chevrolet 12 Ford 3	B. J. McLeod Motorsports	78	Garrett Smithley	Todd Parrott 10; Ken Evans 5	2

=== Changes ===
==== Teams ====
- On September 24, 2019, in a Frontstretch article, Rick Ware Racing owner Rick Ware was interviewed and said that he would like to run three cars full-time in 2020. This news was later confirmed by the team on November 14, 2019.
- On November 1, 2019, Go Fas Racing formed an alliance with Stewart–Haas Racing to receive chassis, data, and technical support from SHR starting in 2020.
- On December 12, 2019, Front Row Motorsports announced they would revert to a two-car operation in 2020, effectively shutting down the No. 36 Ford. Despite this, they will field the No. 36 at the 2020 Daytona 500 in a collaboration with Rick Ware Racing, with David Ragan as its driver. On January 21, 2020, FRM renewed its technical alliance with Roush Fenway Racing. On February 3, 2020, Bob Pockrass reported that the No. 36's owner points and charter will be transferred over to the No. 38, while the No. 38's owner points and charter from 2019 will go to the Rick Ware Racing No. 53 (No. 36 at Daytona).
- On December 12, 2019, it was announced that Felix Sabates, co-owner of Chip Ganassi Racing's NASCAR division, would be retiring in 2020.
- On December 13, 2019, as part of the team's announcement that they would field two cars in the Daytona 500, MBM Motorsports owner Carl Long said that there is a chance they would field the No. 66 full-time in 2020, with Timmy Hill as the primary driver of that car. On February 3, 2020, Bob Pockrass reported that the MBM Motorsports No. 49 team will use the owner points of the No. 46 from the previous season.
- On December 14, 2019, when it was announced that James Davison would be running the Daytona 500 this season, it was announced that he will be driving a car fielded together by Jonathan Byrd's Racing and Hayward Motorsports, which will be both teams' first forays into NASCAR. The former is an IndyCar Series team and the latter is a Sprint Car team (and both of whom Davison has previously driven for). However, this did not end up happening because the team was not on the official entry list for the race.
- On January 10, 2020, Kaulig Racing announced that they would be fielding a Cup Series team for the first time after running only in the Xfinity Series in their four years of operation. Justin Haley, one of their full-time Xfinity drivers and the defending summer Daytona Cup Series race winner, will drive the No. 16 Cup car for Kaulig in the Daytona 500.
- On March 3, 2020, Bob Pockrass reported that Rick Ware may be in the process of purchasing Premium Motorsports from Jay Robinson. On May 13, Pockrass confirmed that Ware had completed the transaction, acquiring the No. 15 charter. As a result of the acquisition, the RWR No. 52 team was renumbered to the No. 27 due to sponsorship preference. Ware explained that he purchased Premium Motorsports to own two charters (the No. 15 and No. 27), as the ones for the No. 51 and No. 53 are leased from Richard Petty Motorsports and Front Row Motorsports, respectively.
- On May 11, 2020, Tommy Baldwin Racing announced they would return to the Cup Series at the first of the May Darlington races with Josh Bilicki driving the No. 7 Chevrolet. This is the team's first attempt since the 2019 Daytona 500.
- On May 11, 2020, it was revealed through the 2020 The Real Heroes 400 entry list that B. J. McLeod would be debuting his team, which currently competes in the Xfinity Series, in the Cup Series with the No. 78 Chevrolet/Ford. He stated the following day that he is set to compete in both Darlington and Charlotte races in May, with the potential of up to 15 events this season after buying equipment from Rick Ware Racing, a team he has driven for in the Cup Series in select races for the last few years.
- On August 4, 2020, it was announced that for the Michigan doubleheader, the Spire Motorsports No. 77 car would be renumbered to the No. 74. The car will have a paint scheme that will be seen in the Netflix sitcom The Crew, starring Kevin James, and will have "sponsorship" from the fictional company Fake Steak. Camera shots and film of the car competing in the two races will be featured in the TV show.

==== Drivers ====
- On June 7, 2019, Daniel Suárez was reportedly working on extending his one-year contract with Stewart–Haas Racing. On October 5, 2019, Suárez stated that he and Stewart-Haas were getting close to an agreement. On November 14, 2019, it was officially announced that Suárez would not return to the No. 41 car in 2020. On December 6, 2019, it was reported that Richard Childress Racing was interested in hiring Suárez either for a third team or as the driver of the No. 2 Chevrolet in the Xfinity Series. On January 6, 2020, Adam Stern of Sports Business Journal reported that Suárez is still working on a deal for 2020, with the Gaunt Brothers Racing No. 96 car being his top option. On January 28, 2020, Suárez officially signed with Gaunt Brothers Racing for 2020.
- On June 10, 2019, Richard Childress Racing was reportedly working on getting Tyler Reddick a full-time Cup Series ride in 2020, either with the team or its alliances. Later, on July 30, 2019, team owner Richard Childress said that Reddick would not be in the Xfinity Series next year as long as he stays with his team, and that the Cup Series was the only option. On September 4, 2019, it was reported that RCR is unclear if they can afford a third team for Reddick, and that Reddick has been talking to other teams such as Roush Fenway Racing. On October 2, 2019, RCR officially announced Reddick as the driver of the No. 8 Chevrolet for the 2020 season. In addition, Reddick will compete for the 2020 NASCAR Rookie of the Year honors.
- On June 28, 2019, Christopher Bell signed a contract extension with Joe Gibbs Racing, but had stated he was unsure if he will stay in the Xfinity Series or advance to the Cup Series. On August 15, 2019, when asked about the rumors of him replacing Matt DiBenedetto in the Leavine Family Racing No. 95 Toyota in 2020, Bell said that no deals had been signed yet. On September 24, 2019, LFR officially announced Bell as the driver of the No. 95 in 2020. In addition, Bell will compete for the 2020 Rookie of the Year honors.
- On August 13, 2019, it was reported that Matt DiBenedetto may not return to Leavine Family Racing in 2020, with rumors that the No. 95 Toyota will be vacated for either Christopher Bell or Erik Jones, with the other driver in the Joe Gibbs Racing No. 20. Two days later, DiBenedetto confirmed that he would not be back with LFR after the end of the 2019 season.
- On August 14, 2019, it was announced that David Ragan would be retiring from full-time competition following the 2019 season. However, it was announced on January 10, 2020, that Ragan would return to run the Daytona 500 in the Front Row's No. 36 car in a collaboration with Rick Ware Racing.
- On August 16, 2019, Ryan Preece confirmed he would return to JTG Daugherty Racing for the 2020 season. However, this year, he will drive the No. 37, with his new teammate Ricky Stenhouse Jr. (who replaced Chris Buescher) in the No. 47 which Preece drove in 2019.
- On August 17, 2019, Aric Almirola confirmed that he is signed with the Stewart–Haas Racing No. 10 Ford for the 2020 season.
- On August 17, 2019, Daniel Hemric stated he was "iffy" about his status for 2020, with Tyler Reddick likely moving to Cup and if Richard Childress Racing is not able to find sponsorship to run a third car full-time, Hemric may lose his ride to Reddick despite having signed a two-year contract with the team last year. On September 17, 2019, RCR announced that Hemric would not return to the team following the 2019 season.
- On August 19, 2019, it was reported that Corey LaJoie's status with Go Fas Racing in 2020 is uncertain, as Xfinity driver Cole Custer has been mentioned as an option for the No. 32 Ford while the Front Row Motorsports No. 38 car may be an option for LaJoie with David Ragan not returning to that ride next year. If Custer ends up in the No. 32, the team would start a partnership with Stewart–Haas Racing, the team he competes for currently in the Xfinity Series and where his father serves as a team executive. Specifically, it was reported that SHR discussed the possibility of offloading many of their cars to GFR to make room for the Gen-7 car which will debut in 2021. On November 15, 2019, Stewart–Haas Racing announced that Custer will replace Suárez in the No. 41 Ford and compete for the 2020 Rookie of the Year honors. On December 3, 2019, it was confirmed that LaJoie had signed a deal to return to the No. 32 in 2020.
- On August 21, 2019, it was reported that Rick Ware Racing was considering Garrett Smithley to drive the No. 51 full-time (in every race) in 2020. When asked about his future with RWR, Smithley replied: "I'm going to take it one race at a time." On September 24, Smithley was interviewed about those rumors and he stated that if he could do what he wanted, he would try to do something similar to what Ross Chastain did in 2019 and run as many races as possible in all three series (Cup, Xfinity, and Truck). In the same article, RWR team owner Rick Ware said that he anticipated Smithley would run several races with his team in 2020, whether it was full-time or part-time. On February 18, 2020, RWR announced Smithley's return to the team.
- On September 6, 2019, Ty Dillon posted a video to his Instagram in which he denied the rumors that he would be retiring after the 2019 season to move into a management role at his grandfather's team, Richard Childress Racing, which has an alliance with the Germain Racing No. 13 team he drives for. The rumor was that either Tyler Reddick would take his place in the No. 13, moving up from the RCR No. 2 car in the Xfinity Series, or that Reddick would bump Daniel Hemric out of the No. 8 car and Hemric would be in the RCR-aligned No. 13 for Germain.
- On September 10, 2019, Paul Menard announced he will retire from full-time racing after the 2019 season and at the same time, Wood Brothers Racing signed Matt DiBenedetto to drive for the No. 21 Ford full-time for the 2020 season. It was previously reported on July 12, 2019, that Menard had re-signed with WBR and was expected to return to the No. 21 team in 2020 with speculation that he had been considering retiring within the next few years after 2020.
- On September 13, 2019, it was reported that Chris Buescher and JTG Daugherty Racing were "in progress" in negotiating Buescher's contract renewal. However, on September 25, 2019, it was announced that Buescher would be returning to Roush Fenway Racing and would drive the No. 17 Ford, replacing Ricky Stenhouse Jr., who was released from the team despite having signed a contract extension through 2021 on August 1, 2019.
- On October 16, 2019, JTG Daugherty Racing announced that they signed Ricky Stenhouse Jr. to a multi-year deal starting in 2020. Stenhouse replaces Chris Buescher as a driver for JTGD, although he will drive the No. 47 this season, replacing his new teammate Ryan Preece who will be in the No. 37.
- On November 7, 2019, it was reported that John Hunter Nemechek may be close to signing a deal with Front Row Motorsports for the 2020 season. Nemechek replaced Matt Tifft in the No. 36 Ford for the final three races of the 2019 season. On December 12, Nemechek was announced as the new driver of the No. 38 Ford, replacing David Ragan and competing for the 2020 Rookie of the Year honors.
- On November 13, 2019, it was announced that Matt Tifft and Front Row Motorsports have mutually parted ways after Tifft started having health issues towards the end of the 2019 season.
- On November 14, 2019, it was announced that J. J. Yeley would run the full season for Rick Ware Racing in 2020 after running part-time for them last year. The exact car he will drive has not been announced.
- On November 27, 2019, it was announced that Quin Houff would drive the No. 00 Chevrolet for StarCom Racing full-time in 2020 and 2021, replacing Landon Cassill, who is likely to still remain with the team in some other way. Houff had driven part-time for Spire Motorsports and Premium Motorsports last year in the Nos. 15, 27, and 77 cars. In addition, Houff will compete for the 2020 Rookie of the Year honors.
- On December 11, 2019, it was announced that Brennan Poole would be running the full season in the No. 15 for Premium Motorsports and compete for the 2020 Rookie of the Year honors. In 2019, he drove most of the Truck Series schedule for On Point Motorsports. He has also driven full-time in the Xfinity Series for Chip Ganassi Racing.
- On December 14, 2019, it was announced that Australian James Davison would make his Cup debut at the Daytona 500 in an entry jointly fielded by Jonathan Byrd's Racing, an IndyCar Series team he has driven for in the past, and Hayward Motorsports, a Sprint Car team he has driven for in the past. The car will come from Rick Ware Racing. He has made four Xfinity Series starts as a road course ringer. Davison primarily drives in IndyCar, and will attempt to qualify for the Indianapolis 500 this year, meaning he will run both marquee races in the same year.
- On December 20, 2019, Rick Ware Racing announced that Joey Gase will drive one of their cars full-time in 2020. After many years running full-time in the Xfinity Series, this is Gase's first full season in Cup. He ended up driving multiple cars for the team instead of one for the whole year. He drove the No. 51 in the Daytona 500 before moving to the No. 53 for the next few races. He will return to the No. 51 at Darlington.
- On January 9, 2020, it was announced that Ross Chastain would drive the No. 77 Chevrolet for Spire Motorsports at the Daytona 500 as well as the Coca-Cola 600 in a partnership with Chip Ganassi Racing, the same way how the two teams jointly fielded Jamie McMurray's entry at the 2019 Daytona 500.
- On January 10, 2020, Justin Haley, a full-time Xfinity Series driver for Kaulig Racing, was announced to pilot Kaulig's new part-time Cup Series car, the No. 16 Chevrolet, in the Daytona 500. He ran three races last year driving the No. 77 for Spire Motorsports, including at the summer Daytona race where he pulled off an upset win in his third series start.
- On January 17, 2020, Parker Kligerman announced that he has no plans to return to the No. 96 of Gaunt Brothers Racing or in any of NASCAR's three national series.
- On February 17, 2020, Ryan Newman was injured in a last-lap flip across the finish line at the Daytona 500. After being removed from his car by safety personnel, Newman was taken to the hospital and then released from the hospital on the Wednesday after the race, and continues to recover from the crash. He eventually spoke publicly about his future driving plans, attending the Phoenix race and appearing on the TODAY Show, where he indicated that he will return to driving as soon as he is able to. Ross Chastain substituted for Newman in the No. 6 at Las Vegas, California, and Phoenix. On April 27, 2020, it was announced that Newman was medically cleared to return to competition. In addition, NASCAR granted him a waiver for eligibility in the 2020 playoffs.
- On April 13, 2020, Chip Ganassi Racing suspended Kyle Larson indefinitely without pay after he was found to use a racial slur during an iRacing event the day before. Shortly after Ganassi's announcement, NASCAR also suspended him indefinitely. The following day, Ganassi outright released Larson. On April 27, 2020, Ganassi announced that Matt Kenseth will drive the No. 42 for the remainder of the season. In addition, NASCAR granted Kenseth a waiver for eligibility in the 2020 playoffs.
- On July 3, 2020, it was announced that Jimmie Johnson tested positive for COVID-19, forcing him to miss the 2020 Brickyard 400. Justin Allgaier was announced as his replacement for the race. On July 8, 2020, Johnson was cleared to race after testing negative twice that week.
- On August 15, 2020, it was announced that Austin Dillon tested positive for COVID-19, forcing him to miss the 2020 Go Bowling 235 at Daytona. Kaz Grala was announced as his replacement for the race, making it Grala's Cup debut. On August 20, 2020, Dillon was cleared to race after testing negative twice that week.
- On September 17, 2020, it was announced that J. J. Yeley would replace Brennan Poole in the Premium Motorsports No. 15 car for the 2020 Bass Pro Shops NRA Night Race at Bristol after Poole was unable to secure sponsorship for the race.

==== Crew chiefs ====
- On September 24, 2019, it was announced that Joe Gibbs Racing crew chief Jason Ratcliff will replace Mike Wheeler as the crew chief of the Leavine Family Racing No. 95 Toyota, to be driven by Christopher Bell in 2020. Both Ratcliff and Bell worked together in the Xfinity Series in the 2018 and 2019 seasons. Ratcliff was last a crew chief in Cup Series competition in 2017, with driver Matt Kenseth and the No. 20 Joe Gibbs Racing team. Wheeler will move to the position of LFR's competition director.
- On October 7, 2019, Rodney Childers confirmed that he agreed to a multiyear contract extension with Stewart–Haas Racing as the crew chief of the No. 4 Ford driven by Kevin Harvick.
- On October 17, 2019, Roush Fenway Racing announced that Brian Pattie would not return as the crew chief for their No. 17 car, which will now be driven by Chris Buescher. He had worked for the team for the past four years, in 2016 with Greg Biffle and then since 2017 with Ricky Stenhouse Jr. On November 5, 2019, Luke Lambert was announced as Pattie's replacement at Roush Fenway Racing, moving over from Richard Childress Racing after many years there, most recently as the crew chief for their No. 31/8 car, working with Jeff Burton, Ryan Newman, and Daniel Hemric.
- On October 28, 2019, Danny Stockman announced he will step down as the crew chief of the Richard Childress Racing No. 3 car, driven by Austin Dillon at the end of the 2019 season. Justin Alexander will return as the No. 3 team's crew chief in 2020 after having served that position in the 2017 and 2018 seasons.
- On November 5, 2019, it was announced that Richard Childress Racing crew chief Randall Burnett would be moving up with Tyler Reddick from RCR's Xfinity Series No. 2 team to the No. 8 Cup car. He replaces Luke Lambert, who on the same day was announced to be leaving to join Roush Fenway Racing in 2020 as the No. 17 crew chief.
- On November 25, 2019, Joe Williams announced that he has left the StarCom Racing No. 00 team. StarCom Racing has yet to announce his replacement for 2020.
- On December 2, 2019, it was announced that Brian Pattie would move with Ricky Stenhouse Jr. to JTG Daugherty Racing, where he will crew chief the No. 47 car, which Stenhouse will drive.
- On December 4, 2019, Stewart–Haas Racing announced a change in their crew chief lineup. Mike Shiplett will replace Billy Scott as the crew chief of the No. 41 Ford, to be driven by Cole Custer in 2020. Both Shiplett and Custer worked together during the 2019 NASCAR Xfinity Series. In addition, Johnny Klausmeier and Mike Bugarewicz will switch teams, with Klausmeier going to the No. 14 team of Clint Bowyer and Bugarewicz going to the No. 10 team of Aric Almirola. Scott later tweeted the following day that he had joined Richard Childress Racing as the head of engineering, replacing Justin Alexander, who is returning to crew chiefing at RCR full-time in 2020 with Austin Dillon's No. 3 team.
- On December 6, 2019, reporter Bob Pockrass tweeted that Mike Kelley has left Front Row Motorsports and started working at JTG Daugherty Racing, overseeing their fabrication shop. He worked a portion of the 2019 season with Matt Tifft's No. 36 team and the remainder with David Ragan's No. 38 team after a swap with Seth Barbour.
- On December 9, 2019, Cole Pearn announced he had parted ways with Joe Gibbs Racing to pursue opportunities outside of NASCAR. Pearn served as Martin Truex Jr.'s crew chief at Furniture Row Racing from 2014 to 2018 and at JGR in 2019. On December 19, 2019, James Small was announced as Truex's new crew chief for 2020. He previously worked with Truex as an engineer at both JGR and Furniture Row. Small was also interim crew chief for Erik Jones' No. 77 FRR team in 2017 for two races.
- On January 6, 2020, Team Penske announced that all crew chiefs would be seeing a move to different teams within the organization. Paul Wolfe would be moving from the No. 2 of Keselowski to the No. 22 of Logano, Todd Gordon would be moving from Logano to the No. 12 of Blaney, and Bullins would be moving to join Keselowski.
- On January 6, 2020, Richard Petty Motorsports announced that Jerry Baxter would be the crew chief for Bubba Wallace in 2020, replacing first-year crew chief Derek Stamets, who worked with the No. 43 team last season. He previously was a crew chief for GMS Racing in the Truck Series, working with drivers Cody Coughlin, Timothy Peters, Tyler Dippel, and Brett Moffitt for the last two years. Baxter worked with Wallace Jr. in 2013 and 2014 in the Truck Series at Kyle Busch Motorsports, earning five wins paired together.
- On January 7, 2020, Go Fas Racing announced that Ryan Sparks would be the crew chief for the No. 32 car, driven by Corey LaJoie. Sparks previously served as a race engineer at Richard Childress Racing for the No. 3 of Austin Dillon.
- On January 22, 2020, it was reported that Dave Winston would be the crew chief for the Gaunt Brothers Racing No. 96 car, driven by Daniel Suárez. Winston previously served as a race engineer for Richard Childress Racing.
- On January 23, 2020, it was announced that Steve Idol would be the crew chief of the MBM Motorsports No. 66 Cup Series team, after previously having been a car chief for the organization.
- On August 4, 2020, Chip Ganassi Racing announced that Chad Johnston would be replaced as crew chief on the No. 42 car by the team's engineer, Phil Surgen, for the remainder of the season.

==== Interim crew chiefs ====
- On March 1, 2020, prior to the 2020 Auto Club 400 at Fontana, the No. 37 and No. 47 teams of JTG Daugherty Racing were docked 10 owner and driver points each and crew chiefs Trent Owens and Brian Pattie were suspended for the race after the cars were discovered to have an illegal modification during pre-race inspection. Brian Burns and Eddie Pardue took over the crew chief duties for the No. 37 and No. 47, respectively, for the race.
- On May 18, 2020, following the 2020 The Real Heroes 400 at Darlington, Joe Gibbs Racing No. 20 crew chief Chris Gayle was suspended for one race and fined US$20,000 after it was discovered that two lug nuts were not safely secured during post-race inspection. Race engineer Seth Chavka was announced to take over Gayle's duties at the 2020 Toyota 500 at Darlington.
- On May 25, 2020, following the 2020 Coca-Cola 600, Joe Gibbs Racing No. 11 crew chief Chris Gabehart, car chief Brandon Griffeth, and engineer Scott Simmons were suspended for four races after a tungsten ballast came loose and fell off the frame rail of the car during the start of the race.
- On July 21, 2020, it was announced that Hendrick Motorsports No. 24 crew chief Chad Knaus would miss the 2020 Super Start Batteries 400 at Kansas to be with his wife for the birth of their second child. Keith Rodden was announced as his replacement for the race.
- On August 2, 2020, prior to the 2020 Foxwoods Resort Casino 301 at New Hampshire, Richard Petty Motorsports No. 43 crew chief Jerry Baxter and Go Fas Racing No. 32 crew chief Ryan Sparks were suspended for the race and their respective teams were each penalized 10 driver and owner points after their cars failed pre-race inspection for improperly mounted ballasts. Roy Gangdal, the engineer for the No. 32 team, would substitute for Sparks as LaJoie's crew chief for that race.
- On August 2, 2020, following the 2020 Foxwoods Resort Casino 301 at New Hampshire, Stewart–Haas Racing No. 14 crew chief Johnny Klausmeier was suspended for the 2020 FireKeepers Casino 400 at Michigan and fined US$20,000 after the car was discovered to have two loose lug nuts during post-race inspection. On September 6, 2020, following the 2020 Cook Out Southern 500 at Darlington, Klausmeier was suspended for the 2020 Federated Auto Parts 400 at Richmond and fined US$20,000 for the same post-race violation.
- On September 6, 2020, prior to the 2020 Cook Out Southern 500, Team Penske No. 12 crew chief Todd Gordon was suspended for the race due to the car's ballast being improperly installed. Travis Geisler, Penske's competition director, served as the interim crew chief for the No. 12 in that race.
- On September 6, 2020, following the 2020 Cook Out Southern 500, Joe Gibbs Racing No. 18 crew chief Adam Stevens was suspended for the Richmond race and fined US$20,000 after the car was discovered to have two loose lug nuts during post-race inspection.
- On October 25, 2020, prior to the 2020 Autotrader EchoPark Automotive 500 at Texas Motor Speedway, Joe Gibbs Racing No. 19 crew chief James Small was suspended for the race and fined US$35,000 while the team was docked 20 driver and owner points for an unapproved rear spoiler during pre-race inspection.

==== Manufacturers ====
- On October 31, 2019, Chevrolet announced a new Cup body based on the Camaro ZL1 1LE. The body was approved in Summer 2019.
- After running only Toyotas in 2019, it was announced that at the Daytona 500, MBM Motorsports' No. 66 car would be a Ford.

== Rule changes ==
=== 2020 package ===
- On January 28, 2020, NASCAR announced a change in stage lengths for 16 races in the Cup Series. The affected tracks will have the length of their final stages decreased so that only one green-flag pit stop is required instead of two.
- On October 1, 2019, NASCAR released the 2020 rules package. Among the changes to the rules is the reduction of road crew members from 12 to 10. Teams with three or more cars are limited to three roster spots. Wind tunnel testing is limited to 150 hours per team and will only be permitted at four wind tunnel facilities (three in North Carolina and one in Indiana). Each car number is allowed a maximum chassis quantity of 12 units. Teams must compete with long block and short block sealed engines in a minimum of eight races each.
- On January 14, 2020, NASCAR announced a reduced downforce package for short tracks and road courses. The new aero package consists of the following changes:

- The rear spoiler will be reduced from 8 inches to 2.75 inches in height.
- The front splitter's overhang will be reduced from 2 inches to a quarter-inch, with its wings trimmed from 10.5 inches to 2 inches.
- The radiator pan's vertical fencing will be removed to reduce front-end downforce.

- On June 15, 2020, NASCAR announced in response to Newman's Daytona 500 crash that aeroducts would be removed from the cars for Daytona and Talladega, as well as reduce horsepower from 550 to 520. This, along with slip tape being mandatory, were intended to limit the ability to tandem draft and lower speeds.
- On August 19, 2020, NASCAR allowed teams to remove a portion of the passenger side window starting with the Dover doubleheader to address the heat exhaustion experienced by drivers during the summer races.

=== Charter system ===
- On February 14, 2020, NASCAR announced the extension of the charter system through 2024. The charter system was first implemented in 2016 and had a five-year term that ran until 2020.

== Schedule ==
NASCAR unveiled the 2020 schedule on March 26, 2019.

Due to implications from the COVID-19 pandemic, the schedule was changed significantly during the season as detailed below.

No	Race title	Track	Location	Date	Time (ET)
	Busch Clash	O Daytona International Speedway	Daytona Beach, Florida	February 9	3:00 PM
	Bluegreen Vacations Duel	O Daytona International Speedway	Daytona Beach, Florida	February 13	7:00 PM
1	**Daytona 500**	O Daytona International Speedway	Daytona Beach, Florida	February 16–17 (Note: The Daytona 500 was stopped at Lap 21 on Sunday, due to rain. The race was completed the following day.)	2:30 PM
2	Pennzoil 400	O Las Vegas Motor Speedway	Las Vegas, Nevada	February 23	3:30 PM
3	Auto Club 400	O Auto Club Speedway	Fontana, California	March 1	3:30 PM
4	FanShield 500	O Phoenix Raceway	Avondale, Arizona	March 8	3:30 PM
5	The Real Heroes 400 (Note: The Real Heroes 400 replaced the June Chicagoland race, the Camping World 400.)	O Darlington Raceway	Darlington, South Carolina	May 17	3:30 PM
6	Toyota 500 (Note: The Toyota 500 replaced the spring April Richmond race, the Toyota Owners 400.)	O Darlington Raceway	Darlington, South Carolina	May 20	6:00 PM
7	**Coca-Cola 600**	O Charlotte Motor Speedway	Concord, North Carolina	May 24	6:00 PM
8	Alsco Uniforms 500 (Note: The Alsco Uniforms 500 replaced the June Sonoma race, the Toyota/Save Mart 350.)	O Charlotte Motor Speedway	Concord, North Carolina	May 28	8:00 PM
9	Food City presents the Supermarket Heroes 500	O Bristol Motor Speedway	Bristol, Tennessee	May 31	3:00 PM
10	Folds of Honor QuikTrip 500	O Atlanta Motor Speedway	Hampton, Georgia	June 7	3:00 PM
11	Blue-Emu Maximum Pain Relief 500	O Martinsville Speedway	Ridgeway, Virginia	June 10	7:00 PM
12	Dixie Vodka 400	O Homestead–Miami Speedway	Homestead, Florida	June 14	3:30 PM
13	GEICO 500	O Talladega Superspeedway	Lincoln, Alabama	June 22 (Note: The GEICO 500 was delayed until Monday due to rain.)	3:00 PM
14	Pocono Organics 325	O Pocono Raceway	Long Pond, Pennsylvania	June 27	3:30 PM
15	Pocono 350	O Pocono Raceway	Long Pond, Pennsylvania	June 28	4:00 PM
16	**Big Machine Hand Sanitizer 400**	O Indianapolis Motor Speedway	Speedway, Indiana	July 5	4:00 PM
17	Quaker State 400	O Kentucky Speedway	Sparta, Kentucky	July 12	2:30 PM
	NASCAR All-Star Open	O Bristol Motor Speedway	Bristol, Tennessee	July 15	7:00 PM
	NASCAR All-Star Race	O Bristol Motor Speedway	Bristol, Tennessee	July 15	8:30 PM
18	O'Reilly Auto Parts 500	O Texas Motor Speedway	Fort Worth, Texas	July 19	3:00 PM
19	Super Start Batteries 400	O Kansas Speedway	Kansas City, Kansas	July 23	7:30 PM
20	Foxwoods Resort Casino 301	O New Hampshire Motor Speedway	Loudon, New Hampshire	August 2	3:00 PM
21	FireKeepers Casino 400 (Note: 400 mile races shortened to 500 kilometers.)	O Michigan International Speedway	Brooklyn, Michigan	August 8	4:00 PM
22	Consumers Energy 400	O Michigan International Speedway	Brooklyn, Michigan	August 9	4:30 PM
23	Go Bowling 235 (Note: The Go Bowling 235 replaced the August Watkins Glen race, the Go Bowling at The Glen.)	R Daytona International Speedway (Road Course)	Daytona Beach, Florida	August 16	3:00 PM
24	Drydene 311 (Saturday)	O Dover International Speedway	Dover, Delaware	August 22	4:00 PM
25	Drydene 311 (Sunday)	O Dover International Speedway	Dover, Delaware	August 23	4:00 PM
26	Coke Zero Sugar 400	O Daytona International Speedway	Daytona Beach, Florida	August 29	7:30 PM
NASCAR Cup Series Playoffs
Round of 16
27	**Cook Out Southern 500**	O Darlington Raceway	Darlington, South Carolina	September 6	6:00 PM
28	Federated Auto Parts 400	O Richmond Raceway	Richmond, Virginia	September 12	7:30 PM
29	Bass Pro Shops NRA Night Race	O Bristol Motor Speedway	Bristol, Tennessee	September 19	7:30 PM
Round of 12
30	South Point 400	O Las Vegas Motor Speedway	Las Vegas, Nevada	September 27	7:00 PM
31	YellaWood 500	O Talladega Superspeedway	Lincoln, Alabama	October 4	2:00 PM
32	Bank of America Roval 400	R Charlotte Motor Speedway (Roval)	Concord, North Carolina	October 11	2:30 PM
Round of 8
33	Hollywood Casino 400	O Kansas Speedway	Kansas City, Kansas	October 18	2:30 PM
34	Autotrader EchoPark Automotive 500	O Texas Motor Speedway	Fort Worth, Texas	October 25 & 28 (Note: The Autotrader EchoPark Automotive 500 was stopped at Lap 52 on Sunday for 3 days, due to rain. The race was completed the following Wednesday.)	3:30 PM
35	Xfinity 500	O Martinsville Speedway	Ridgeway, Virginia	November 1	3:00 PM
Championship 4
36	Season Finale 500	O Phoenix Raceway	Avondale, Arizona	November 8	3:00 PM

Bolded races indicate a NASCAR Major, also known as Crown Jewel race.

O Oval track
R Road course

=== Changes ===
The original 2020 schedule for the NASCAR Cup Series underwent a series of significant changes.

- The Folds of Honor QuikTrip 500 at Atlanta Motor Speedway moved from the second race to the fifth race of the season behind the West Coast swing to March 15, 2020, returning to its pre-2010 date of mid-March.
- The Dixie Vodka 400 at Homestead–Miami Speedway moved to March 22, 2020, no longer serving as the season finale.
- After 21 years of being held in proximity to Independence Day weekend, the Coke Zero Sugar 400 at Daytona International Speedway moved to August to become the final race of NASCAR's "regular season". The Brickyard 400, run at Indianapolis Motor Speedway, moved to the Independence Day weekend.
- The Blue-Emu Maximum Pain Relief 500 at Martinsville Speedway was switched to a Saturday night race on May 9.
- Kansas Speedway's spring race, the Super Start Batteries 400 moved to a Sunday afternoon race on May 31 (vacating the Mother's Day weekend scheduling now held by Martinsville), following the Coca-Cola 600.
- Pocono Raceway's two races were consolidated into a doubleheader weekend, with the Pocono Organics 325 and Pocono 350 held across two consecutive days. The starting order for the second race would be determined by reversing the order of the lead lap finishers from the first race.
- Dover International Speedway's second date moves to late August, marking the first time the race has not been in NASCAR's postseason.
- The Toyota/Save Mart 350 will move one week earlier than 2018.
- The Cook Out Southern 500 at Darlington Raceway will be held as the first race of the Playoffs, as the South Point 400 at Las Vegas Motor Speedway will move to the first race of the Round of 12.
- The Bass Pro Shops NRA Night Race at Bristol Motor Speedway will move from mid-August to mid-September, replacing Charlotte and becoming the final race of the Round of 16.
- The Championship Round of the Playoffs will be conducted at Phoenix Raceway on November 8. This will be the first Phoenix race to close out the season. Due to this and the consolidation of the Pocono doubleheader, the 2020 season will end one week earlier than in the past. Usually, the season finale had been held on the third weekend in November, falling sometime between November 16–22.
- The Bank of America Roval 400 at Charlotte Motor Speedway will become the final race of the Round of 12, replacing Kansas.
- The Hollywood Casino 400 at Kansas Speedway will be held one week later than 2019, replacing Martinsville and becoming the first race of the Round of 8.
- The Toyota Owners 400 at Richmond will move back to Sunday afternoon, similar to 2015–2017 when it was run on a Sunday afternoon. This was done because the two Martinsville Speedway races will be night races in 2020, as both races will start in the day and end at night.
- Two off-weeks between Loudon and Michigan were scheduled to accommodate the (now-postponed) 2020 Summer Olympics (which are broadcast by NBCUniversal networks).

=== Changes due to the COVID-19 pandemic ===
- In wake of the Rudy Gobert and the NBA situation, on March 12, 2020, NASCAR initially announced that the Folds of Honor QuikTrip 500 at Atlanta Motor Speedway and the Dixie Vodka 400 at Homestead–Miami Speedway would take place as scheduled, but behind closed doors with no spectators admitted. The next day in respect of the NBA 2019–2020 season suspension, NASCAR announced that the two races and all associated events had been postponed.
- On March 16, 2020, NASCAR announced all race events through May 3, 2020 had been postponed.
- On April 17, 2020, NASCAR announced that Martinsville Speedway race weekend on May 8–9, 2020 had been postponed, although the sanctioning body affirmed its commitment to running a full 36-race schedule.
- On April 30, 2020, NASCAR announced a revised schedule for the month of May, with two Cup races at Darlington Raceway and two points-paying races at Charlotte Motor Speedway, including the Coca-Cola 600 that will be run with no fans in the stands (Charlotte did allow each owner of a Turn 1 condominium complex overlooking the track five tickets each to the races).
- On May 8, 2020, NASCAR announced that Sonoma Raceway and Chicagoland Speedway would not host Cup races in 2020, and that Richmond Raceway's postponed spring date would not be rescheduled.
- With the exception of the Coca-Cola 600, all races starting with NASCAR's return at Darlington through the Homestead race at minimum will feature no practice or qualifying. Teams will unload, have cars inspected, and race. The Coca-Cola 600 featured same-day qualifying but no practice.
- On May 14, 2020, NASCAR announced the schedule for late-May through June 21, 2020, including Bristol Motor Speedway, Atlanta Motor Speedway, Martinsville Speedway, Homestead–Miami Speedway, and Talladega Superspeedway. NASCAR also announced that these races would still be held behind closed doors. However, Atlanta, like Charlotte, allowed owners of its Turn 4 condominiums to attend the races with a similar policy to that in place (five tickets for each unit). NASCAR later announced that it would allow spectators at two races as a trial, with the Homestead race inviting a limited audience of 1,000—representing local branches of the U.S. military.
- At the GEICO 500 at Talladega, NASCAR admitted outside spectators for the first time, capped at 5,000 in the stands, as well as limited campsites open.
- On June 15, 2020, NASCAR announced that the All-Star Race would be moved to Bristol Motor Speedway so that it could be held with spectators. The speedway admitted a maximum of 30,000 spectators for the All-Star Race (out of a total capacity of 162,000), the largest attendance of any U.S. sporting event held since the beginning of pandemic-related restrictions.
- On July 8, 2020, NASCAR announced the next phase of revisions to the schedule through the conclusion of the regular season in August, this included twin race weekends at Dover and Michigan (with the races shortened to 500 kilometers each), and the Go Bowling at The Glen being replaced by the Go Bowling 235—NASCAR's first ever road course race at Daytona International Speedway. It was reported that the replacement of the Watkins Glen race was necessitated by travel restrictions imposed by the state of New York, which at the time required 14 days self-isolation for anyone entering the state from areas designated as having large numbers of recent COVID-19 cases (including North Carolina, where the majority of NASCAR teams and staff are based). Fans could have been admitted at events on a case-by-case basis depending on local health orders.
- On July 21, 2020, NASCAR announced that the remaining national series events on the 2020 schedule would be held without practice and qualifying.

== Season summary ==
=== Race reports ===
Speedweeks 2020

In Daytona 500 qualifying, Ricky Stenhouse Jr. won the pole with Alex Bowman qualifying second.

In the Busch Clash, Ryan Newman started on pole. Brad Keselowski led the most laps. Joey Logano was leading, but got into the wall after contact with Kyle Busch that also collected Keselowski. On the restart, several drivers spun their tires causing a crash before the start-finish line including Kevin Harvick, Martin Truex Jr., and Jimmie Johnson. In overtime, Denny Hamlin had a tire go down and collected several cars. On the next overtime restart, Chase Elliott spun after contact with Kyle Larson. Erik Jones made a last lap pass on Newman with help from Hamlin for the win.

In the Bluegreen Vacations Duel, Ricky Stenhouse Jr. led the first Duel. Daniel Suárez got into the wall after contact with Ryan Blaney. Joey Logano held off Aric Almirola to win his second straight Duel. In the second Duel, Alex Bowman led. J. J. Yeley hit the wall after contact with Corey LaJoie. William Byron and Jimmie Johnson drove past Kevin Harvick and Byron held off Johnson to win. Suárez, Yeley, and Chad Finchum failed to make the race.

Round 1: Daytona 500

Ricky Stenhouse Jr. started on pole. After the first 20 laps, the race was red flagged due to rain and the rest was postponed until the following day. William Byron spun and slammed the wall after contact with polesitter Stenhouse as Chase Elliott won the first stage. Stenhouse was hit from behind coming to pit road as Denny Hamlin won the second stage. In the closing laps, Kyle Busch blew an engine as Brad Keselowski was turned into the wall collecting Jimmie Johnson, Kurt Busch, Aric Almirola, Bubba Wallace, Justin Haley, Martin Truex Jr., Alex Bowman, Austin Dillon and Matt DiBenedetto. Ross Chastain had a tire go down and collected Joey Logano, Ryan Preece, Ty Dillon, Tyler Reddick, and Christopher Bell. Clint Bowyer and Michael McDowell spun sending the race to overtime. Ryan Newman took the lead from Hamlin on the last lap, but was turned by Ryan Blaney and went airborne and landing on the roof before being plowed into by Corey LaJoie. Hamlin edged Blaney at the line for his third 500 win in five years and his second consecutive Daytona 500 win, becoming the first driver since Sterling Marlin to win back-to-back 500s. Newman was found unresponsive and was removed from the car and was rushed to the hospital with serious, but non-life-threatening injuries.

Round 2: Pennzoil 400

Kyle Busch won the pole after qualifying was cancelled due to rain. Chase Elliott dominated early and won both stages. Martin Truex Jr. had to return to pit road to tighten lug nuts and later slammed the wall after having a tire go down. Elliott also had a tire go down and slammed the wall. Ryan Blaney, despite a tire rub, took the lead from Joey Logano and was heading to the win until Ross Chastain spun. Blaney and Alex Bowman pitted while Logano stayed out. William Byron had a tire rub and wrecked along with Blaney, Kyle Busch, and John Hunter Nemechek as Logano held off Matt DiBenedetto for his second straight Vegas win.

Round 3: Auto Club 400

Clint Bowyer started on the pole. Alex Bowman won the first stage. Bowyer brought out the caution after having a tire go down. Kyle Larson got into the wall after contact with Denny Hamlin, but was able to keep going. Ryan Blaney won the second stage. Hamlin made contact with the wall. Bowman took the lead from Martin Truex Jr. and continued to lead with Blaney in second. Blaney had to pit for a flat tire with three laps to go. Bowman continued to lead for his second career Cup victory over Kyle Busch.

Round 4: FanShield 500

Chase Elliott started on pole. Ryan Blaney slammed the wall after making contact with Denny Hamlin and collected Brad Keselowski. Kevin Harvick passed Elliott to win the first stage. Erik Jones got into the wall as Keselowski won the second stage. Tyler Reddick ran well until he got loose and got into the wall. Martin Truex Jr. plowed the wall after contact with Aric Almirola. Ross Chastain spun and an accident between John Hunter Nemechek and Ricky Stenhouse Jr. sent the race to overtime. Joey Logano held off Harvick for his second win of the season. Kyle Larson finished 4th but unbeknownst to all at the time, this would be his final race with Chip Ganassi Racing.

Season paused for two months due to the COVID-19 pandemic

The fifth race of the season was supposed to be the 2020 Folds of Honor QuikTrip 500, the first race at Atlanta since its rescheduling from being the second race of the season (in late February or early March, which it was for 5 years) to mid-March immediately after the west coast swing (the races at Las Vegas, Fontana, and Phoenix) as part of the 2020 schedule changes.

Prior to the Atlanta race, NASCAR announced that no fans would be permitted to attend it due to the COVID-19 pandemic. However, it was announced the following day that the race would instead be outright postponed to sometime later in the season. The same restrictions applied to the following race, the 2020 Dixie Vodka 400, at Homestead–Miami Speedway. It was supposed to be the first Homestead race since its rescheduling from being the season-finale in November (which it was for 18 years) to March as the sixth race of the season as part of the 2020 schedule changes.

Round 5: The Real Heroes 400

This was NASCAR's first race back since the pandemic hit. It was run on May 17 as a one-day show, with no fans in attendance. This additional race at Darlington replaced the race at Chicagoland in June on the schedule. NASCAR announced that there would be no practice or qualifying held so that teams would not need to bring additional crew members to the track and would not need to bring backup cars.

Brad Keselowski was awarded the pole position by a random draw, which was done on the Thursday before the race and televised on NASCAR Race Hub. Ricky Stenhouse Jr. wrecked on the first lap of the race. Jimmie Johnson was leading at the end of the first stage but wrecked after contact with Chris Buescher on the last lap of the stage, with William Byron winning the stage. Keselowski won the second stage of the race. Kevin Harvick led the most laps and won the race, his second win at Darlington and 50th career win.

Round 6: Toyota 500

The second race to air during prime time this season also saw no fans in the stands much like the previous race. Positions 1 through 20 from Sunday's race were inverted, which meant Ryan Preece started on pole by virtue of his 20th-place finish on Sunday. Positions 21 through 40 made up the remaining half of the grid. The Tommy Baldwin racing entry driven by Josh Bilicki did not enter this race which meant only 39 cars started. J. J. Yeley and Gray Gaulding started in the rear due to them not participating in Sunday's race. The race saw Preece, the pole sitter, blow a motor during the first stage and fail to finish. Clint Bowyer led the most laps and won the first and second stages, but got into the wall and spun late in the race. Denny Hamlin was leading when the final caution came out with 28 laps to go when Chase Elliott made contact with Kyle Busch. Busch was attempting to fall in line behind Elliott on the front straightaway of the track, but accidentally spun Elliott into the inside wall. Elliott expressed his displeasure under the caution period, when he climbed from his car and extended his middle finger towards Busch in retaliation. During this caution period, rain began to fall, which caused NASCAR to red flag the race. With 20 laps remaining, NASCAR declared Hamlin the winner. This was Hamlin's second victory of the season.

Round 7: Coca-Cola 600

This race occurred on its originally scheduled date of May 24 but was the first race since the COVID-19 pandemic to feature qualifying as part of a one-day show. This would turn out to be the final race in 2020 that would have an actual qualifying session as NASCAR would announce in late July that there would be no further practice or qualifying sessions for any of NASCAR's 3 national touring series for the remainder of 2020. Kurt Busch started on pole for the race. At the beginning of the race, Denny Hamlin lost ballast from his car and was forced to pit, resulting in him starting the race multiple laps down. The race was red-flagged due to rain during the first stage. Alex Bowman won the first stage of the race under caution after Clint Bowyer got into the wall. Bowman also won the second stage of the race. Joey Logano won the third stage of the race. Chase Elliott was leading late in the race when William Byron spun with two laps to go, setting up an overtime finish. Elliott and several cars came to pit road while other drivers stayed out. Brad Keselowski took the lead and won the race in overtime. Jimmie Johnson crossed the finish line 2nd but failed post-race inspection, resulting in him being disqualified and finishing the race in last place meaning he will start in last place in the next race.

Round 8: Alsco Uniforms 500

The race was postponed from Wednesday to Thursday due to rain. The top 20 from the Coca-Cola 600 was inverted, which meant that William Byron started on pole. Joey Gase and Garrett Smithley got into the wall on the first lap and collected Tyler Reddick and Ty Dillon. Byron had to pit after making contact with Corey LaJoie on pit road. Kyle Busch cut a tire after making contact with Aric Almirola. Brad Keselowski cut a tire and got into the wall along with Matt Kenseth. The race was red flagged due to rain. When the race resumed, Joey Logano won the first stage. Alex Bowman won the second stage and led the start of the final stage until he got into the wall and had to pit. Kevin Harvick took the lead, but Chase Elliott passed Harvick for the lead and held off Denny Hamlin for his seventh career win.

Round 9: Food City presents the Supermarket Heroes 500

A random draw determined the starting lineup with Brad Keselowski starting on pole. After two competition cautions, Chase Elliott won the first stage. Ryan Blaney spun while second and collected Ty Dillon. Ricky Stenhouse Jr. spun and collected several cars including Alex Bowman, Cole Custer, Tyler Reddick, Ryan Preece, and Matt DiBenedetto, which brought out the red flag. Elliott won the second stage as Kevin Harvick made contact with Erik Jones and got into the wall. Bubba Wallace made little contact with Aric Almirola and collected Martin Truex Jr. Denny Hamlin spun after battling Joey Logano for the lead. Elliott got loose and put himself and Logano into the wall, which allowed Keselowski to take the lead and hold off Clint Bowyer for his second win of the season.

Round 10: Folds of Honor QuikTrip 500

Chase Elliott won pole from random draw. Kurt Busch had to serve a drive-thru penalty in the first laps due to failing pre-race inspection multiple times. Martin Truex Jr. won both stages as Michael McDowell and John Hunter Nemechek both had spin outs that brought the only incidents of the day. Kevin Harvick will go on to lead the most laps and grab his second win of the season.

Round 11: Blue-Emu Maximum Pain Relief 500

The first night race to take place at Martinsville since the implementation of the lights in 2017, and the first race to ban all confederate flags from sports events in response to the murder of George Floyd. Ryan Blaney won pole from random draw as a quick caution on lap 5 came out for debris from Austin Dilion's car. He would eventually retire from the race on the final stage due to overheating inside the car. Many noticeable drivers, including Kyle Busch, Denny Hamlin, Erik Jones, Brad Keselowski, Blaney, and Matt Kenseth would struggle in the first stage and would already be a lap or two down until the competition caution came out at lap 60. Another caution would come out with 10 to go in stage 1 from Timmy Hill stalling on pit road. Most drivers who were a lap down opted to take the wave around, but Corey Lajoie opted not to pit while on the lead lap, thus trapping all the wave arounds stuck a lap down. Joey Logano will go on to win stage 1 while Jimmie Johnson would win stage 2. Martin Truex Jr. was busted from going over the commitment box while pitting and had to restart at the tail-end. Two more cautions would come out for incidents involving David Starr and Quin Houff. Truex would assume the lead in the latter portion of the race and would win for the second consecutive time at Martinsville, beating second place Ryan Blaney by 4.232 seconds.

Round 12: Dixie Vodka 400

Denny Hamlin won pole as the start of the race was delayed due to lightning in the area, and again on lap 5. Ryan Newman would spin out in the first stage as Hamlin would go on to win both stages. Chase Elliott led late in the race, but was blocked by lapped car Joey Logano due to their incident that happened at Bristol several weeks prior, allowing Hamlin to regain the lead and score his third win of the season.

Round 13: GEICO 500

The race was pushed from Sunday to Monday afternoon due to rain and lightning that washed out the track. Martin Truex Jr. started on pole from random draw. Denny Hamlin would hit the wall late in stage 1 and would have to repair under green. 5 laps before the end of stage 1, a shower damped the track forcing the red flag for almost an hour. Tyler Reddick would win stage 1 under yellow following race resumption. John Hunter Nemechek would spin out in turn four to bring the only incident in stage 2 as Ricky Stenhouse Jr. would win stage 2. Stage 3 would see two minor crashes involving Chase Elliott and Austin Dillon with 50 to go, and Brennan Poole and Joey Gase would crash with 46 to go. This caution would ultimately turn into a fuel mileage race as many would either barely make it while others would be a few laps short. The race would run green until 3 laps to go when Jimmie Johnson got turned by Kevin Harvick at the start/finish line forcing the race into overtime. Drivers up front like Ryan Blaney, Stenhouse, and Harvick would opt not to pit in order to keep track position and save fuel. On the overtime restart, Harvick would get a push from Chris Buescher to the lead. On the final lap, several drivers would crash in turn 3 involving Clint Bowyer, Matt DiBenedetto, and Truex, allowing Blaney to pass Harvick and score his 4th career win in the Cup Series, beating out Stenhouse by 0.007 seconds as Erik Jones, Aric Almirola, and Nemechek crash coming to the finish.

Round 14: Pocono Organics 325

Aric Almirola started the race on the pole. Joey Logano won the first stage of the race while Almirola won the second stage of the race. Almirola led the most laps in the race. During a round of green-flag pit stops, Almirola took four tires while Kevin Harvick took two tires, resulting in Harvick taking the lead. Late in the race, Logano had to make an unscheduled pit stop due to a flat tire. Harvick held off Denny Hamlin to win the race, his third win of the season and first win at Pocono.

Round 15: Pocono 350

Ryan Preece started the race on the pole following an inversion of the top 20 results from the first Pocono race. Kurt Busch won the first stage of the race. Christopher Bell spun and hit the wall. Toward the end of the second stage, Ryan Blaney made contact with Kyle Busch, sending Busch spinning and into the wall. Brad Keselowski won the second stage of the race. Kevin Harvick was leading in the final stage of the race and came to pit road for a green-flag pit stop, giving the lead to Denny Hamlin. Hamlin pitted 15 laps later and retained the lead once green-flag pit stops cycled through. Hamlin would hold off Harvick to win the race. The win was the fourth of the season for Hamlin and his sixth win at Pocono, tying Jeff Gordon for the most wins at Pocono.

Round 16: Big Machine Hand Sanitizer 400 powered by Big Machine Records

Joey Logano started the race on the pole. On lap 15, a multicar accident occurred on pit road, with a crew member of Ryan Blaney's pit crew suffering injuries. The race was red flagged due to this incident. William Byron won the first stage of the race. Kevin Harvick won the second stage of the race. Several drivers were involved in wrecks due to tire issues, including Byron, Erik Jones, and Alex Bowman. Late in the race, Harvick and Denny Hamlin were battling for the lead. Hamlin cut a tire and hit the wall while leading with 7 laps to go. This caution set up an overtime finish, where Harvick held off Matt Kenseth to win the race, his fourth win of the season.

Round 17: Quaker State 400 presented by Wal-Mart

Kyle Busch started on the pole. Aric Almirola dominated and won the first stage. Matt Kenseth spun after a flat tire while Brad Keselowski won the second stage. On a later restart, Jimmie Johnson was spun after contact with Keselowski. Kenseth spun a second time, setting up a two lap restart. Kevin Harvick and Martin Truex Jr. got side by side for the lead and Ryan Blaney made it three wide. Blaney and Harvick made contact and it allowed Cole Custer to take the lead in a four-wide pass on the last lap and hold off Truex for his first career win. Custer's victory marked the first Cup win by a Cup rookie since Chris Buescher won at Pocono Raceway in August 2016 when fog shortened the event. Cole became the thirty-third driver to win a race in all three of NASCAR's top divisions.

Exhibition: NASCAR All-Star Race

In the Open, Michael McDowell spun after contact with William Byron and collected Bubba Wallace. Aric Almirola and Byron won the first two stages to advance. Matt DiBenedetto held off Clint Bowyer to win the Open and transfer to the All-Star Race along with Bowyer, who won the fan vote.

Martin Truex Jr. started on the pole, but had to start in the back for failing inspection. Kurt Busch spun early as Ryan Blaney won the first stage. Chase Elliott won both the second and third stages. In the final 15 lap stage, Elliott pulled away and held off Kyle Busch to win $1 million. Chase completed the second Father-Son combination to win the All-Star Race. His dad Bill won it in 1986 at Atlanta Motor Speedway. The other combo were the Earnhardts with Dale Sr. winning it three times (1987, 1990, 1993) and Dale Jr. winning it in 2000, becoming the first rookie to win the exhibition event.

Round 18: O'Reilly Auto Parts 500

A random draw gave Aric Almirola the pole. Ryan Blaney dominated and won both stages. On the restart at the start of the final stage, Almirola made contact with Kurt Busch and got into Kyle Busch, who turned Martin Truex Jr. and collected Ryan Preece, Chris Buescher, and Cole Custer. Ty Dillon made contact with William Byron and got into the wall. Alex Bowman got into the wall after contact with Denny Hamlin. Hamlin would then spin on the restart, setting up overtime. Austin Dillon used pit strategy to keep the lead and hold off teammate Tyler Reddick for his first win since the 2018 Daytona 500.

Round 19: Super Start Batteries 400 presented by O'Reilly Auto Parts

A random draw gave the pole to Kevin Harvick. Kyle Busch won the first stage while the second was won by Brad Keselowski. Joey Logano cut a tire and slammed the wall, collecting Austin Dillon, Jimmie Johnson, and Matt DiBenedetto. On the restart, Christopher Bell spun and collected Ryan Newman, Chris Buescher, and Ryan Preece. Denny Hamlin led the most laps and passed Harvick for the lead and held off Keselowski for his fifth win of the season.

Round 20: Foxwoods Resort Casino 301

A random draw gave the pole to Aric Almirola. Kyle Busch slammed the wall early after a flat tire ending his race early. Jimmie Johnson made contact with Clint Bowyer and spun. Denny Hamlin won the first stage and Brad Keselowski won the second stage after passing Hamlin. Matt Kenseth had multiple tire issues and spun three different times. Keselowski led the most laps and held off Hamlin for his third win of the season. This would lead to a contract extension between Keselowski and Team Penske the next day.

Round 21: FireKeepers Casino 400

A random draw gave the pole to Joey Logano. Kevin Harvick dominated and won both stages. John Hunter Nemechek suffered tire problems three times and collected Chris Buescher and Ryan Preece. Cole Custer got into the wall, sending the race to overtime. On the restart, Austin Dillon made contact with Christopher Bell and got into the wall along with Ryan Newman. On the restart, Harvick held off Brad Keselowski for his fifth win of the season.

Round 22: Consumers Energy 400

The top 20 from the previous race gave the pole to Chris Buescher, but had to start at the rear of the field. Clint Bowyer won the first stage while Kevin Harvick won the second stage. Penske teammates Ryan Blaney and Brad Keselowski got together while battling for the lead and got into the wall. Harvick led the most laps and held off Denny Hamlin to sweep the weekend for his sixth win of the season and tying Rusty Wallace for 55 wins on NASCAR's all-time wins list.

Round 23: Go Bowling 235

Kevin Harvick was awarded the pole due to the owner's standings for the first Cup race on the Daytona road course. Chase Elliott won the first stage while Denny Hamlin won the second stage. Alex Bowman lost a tire while Harvick spun twice and Martin Truex Jr. and Ryan Blaney suffered speeding penalties. Kaz Grala, filling in for Austin Dillon who tested positive for COVID-19, was leading late until he had to pit, but finished 7th in his Cup debut. Kyle Busch, who was several laps down due to brake issues, spun with both rear tires flat. The dominant Elliott was able to hold off Hamlin for his second win of the season and his fourth career road course win.

Round 24: Drydene 311 (Saturday)

Chase Elliott was awarded the pole in the first race of the Dover doubleheader. Kurt Busch got into the wall early after contact with Erik Jones and collected Alex Bowman. Kevin Harvick had to pit twice early due to a loose wheel. Denny Hamlin swept the stage wins and led the most laps. Hamlin retook the lead from teammate Martin Truex Jr. in the final laps for his sixth win of the season.

Round 25: Drydene 311 (Sunday)

The top 20 inverted from the previous race gave the pole to Matt DiBenedetto. Ricky Stenhouse Jr. spun after contact with Joey Logano as Chase Elliott rammed into the back of Kyle Busch, ending the day for the 9 team. Kevin Harvick dominated and won both stages. Jimmie Johnson came from a speeding penalty to get the lead off pit road for the final restart. Harvick took the lead from Johnson and held off Martin Truex Jr. for his seventh win of the season, clinching the regular season championship while Kurt Busch, Kyle Busch, and Aric Almirola clinched their spots in the playoffs.

Round 26: Coke Zero Sugar 400

Kevin Harvick was awarded the pole. Joey Logano won both stages and led the most laps. In the closing laps, Tyler Reddick took the lead and made contact with Kyle Busch, causing a multi-car wreck involving Kurt Busch, Ryan Newman, Erik Jones, Ryan Preece, and Ricky Stenhouse Jr. On the restart, Denny Hamlin made contact with Logano, sending Logano spinning and collecting Reddick, Matt Kenseth, Daniel Suárez, Cole Custer, and Jimmie Johnson, ending Johnson's chance of making the playoffs in his final season. In overtime Clint Bowyer, Corey LaJoie, and Ty Dillon wrecked as William Byron would hold off teammate Chase Elliott for his first career win and clinching a spot in the playoffs as Bowyer and Matt DiBenedetto clinched the final two spots.

=== NASCAR Cup Series Playoffs ===
Round 27: Cook Out Southern 500

Chase Elliott was awarded the pole. Brad Keselowski had a tire go down and got into the wall. Bubba Wallace spun and was taken out by transmission issues. Martin Truex Jr. dominated, leading the most laps and winning both stages. In the closing laps, Elliott was passed for the lead by Truex, but Truex wasn't cleared and the two made contact and got into the wall with both cars cutting down tires. Kevin Harvick took the lead and held off a fast charging Austin Dillon for his eighth win of the season, his third at Darlington, and punching his ticket to the next round of the Playoffs.

Round 28: Federated Auto Parts 400

Kevin Harvick was awarded the pole. Jimmie Johnson got into the wall early while Ryan Blaney had tire problems. Denny Hamlin won the first stage while Brad Keselowski won the second stage. Keselowski led the most laps and took the lead from Austin Dillon and held off Martin Truex Jr. for his fourth win of the season and punched his ticket to the next round of the playoffs while Hamlin clinched on points.

Round 29: Bass Pro Shops NRA Night Race

Brad Keselowski was awarded the pole. Ricky Stenhouse Jr. got into the wall after contact with Jimmie Johnson. Chase Elliott won the first stage. William Byron got into Christopher Bell and had heavy damage, taking him out of the race. Kyle Busch won the second stage and was heading to the win until he had a hard time getting around lapped traffic and Kevin Harvick took the lead and held off Busch for his ninth win of the season. Cole Custer, Byron, Ryan Blaney, and Matt DiBenedetto were eliminated from the Playoffs.

Round 30: South Point 400

Kevin Harvick was awarded the pole. Denny Hamlin won the first stage while Chase Elliott won the second stage. Jimmie Johnson had a tire go down after making contact with Ricky Stenhouse Jr. Christopher Bell had a tire go down and collected William Byron, which sent the race to overtime. Kurt Busch would hold off Matt DiBenedetto for his first hometown win and advancing to the next round of the playoffs.

Round 31: YellaWood 500

Denny Hamlin was awarded the pole. Christopher Bell spun into the wall on the first lap. Ricky Stenhouse Jr. got into the wall after spinning. Aric Almirola got turned into the wall while leading and collected Alex Bowman. Chris Buescher won the first stage as it ended under caution. Ryan Blaney got into the wall after a flat tire. Jimmie Johnson made contact with Clint Bowyer and got turned into the wall and collected Austin Dillon, Cole Custer, Daniel Suárez, and Kurt Busch, who went airborne. Martin Truex Jr. won the second stage. The race went to overtime in the end and on the first attempt, Kyle Busch got turned by Tyler Reddick and collected Truex, Kevin Harvick, and Joey Logano. In the second attempt, Bubba Wallace got turned and collected Ryan Blaney and Matt Kenseth. In the third overtime attempt, Hamlin beat Matt DiBenedetto to the finish line for his seventh win of the season and to advance to the next round of the playoffs. DiBenedetto was penalized for pushing William Byron below the double yellow line and Erik Jones was scored second. The race saw a record number of cautions at the track with 13, breaking the previous record of 11 from the fall 2017 race.

Round 32: Bank of America Roval 400

Denny Hamlin was awarded the pole. The early laps took place in the rain with the cars using rain tires. The teams put on slicks after most of the track dried. Ty Dillon put slicks on before the rest and he was able to get to the lead and win the first stage. Ryan Blaney won the second stage, but spun from the lead on the restart. Kyle Busch had to pit with a flat tire and Austin Dillon spun after contact with Busch. On the restart, a stack up caused damage to Clint Bowyer, who needed a win to advance. Matt Kenseth spun and slammed into the tire barrier. Chase Elliott took the lead from Erik Jones and held off Joey Logano for his third win of the season and his fourth straight road course to advance to the next round of the playoffs. Dillon, Aric Almirola, Bowyer, and Kyle Busch were eliminated from the playoffs.

Round 33: Hollywood Casino 400

Chase Elliott was awarded the pole and would win the first stage. Matt Kenseth slammed the wall after contact with Erik Jones. Denny Hamlin would win the second stage, but would get into the wall in the final stage and had to pit. Tyler Reddick had a tire go down and got into the wall. Joey Logano took the lead off pit road and held off the dominant Kevin Harvick for his third win of the season and advancing to the Championship 4 in Phoenix.

Round 34: Autotrader EchoPark Automotive 500

Kevin Harvick was awarded the pole. Prior to the race, Martin Truex Jr. was docked 20 points and having his crew chief suspended for the race for having an illegal spoiler. Harvick led early until he got into the wall, sending him to pit road to fix damage. The race was red flagged due to rain and was postponed until Wednesday as it continued to rain for the next several days. When the race resumed, Matt Kenseth spun after contact with Denny Hamlin and collected Bubba Wallace and Aric Almirola. The two dominate cars, Clint Bowyer and Kyle Busch, won the two stages respectively. Several drivers used different pit strategies. With 20 laps to go, Bowyer pitted while Kyle Busch stayed out trying to win the race on fuel mileage. Busch was able to save enough fuel and held off teammate Truex to finally win in 2020 to break his winless drought.

Round 35: Xfinity 500

Brad Keselowski was awarded the pole. Denny Hamlin won the first stage of the race while Chase Elliott, who led the most laps in the race, won the second stage of the race. Kevin Harvick cut a tire early in the race and had to make an unscheduled green-flag pit stop, causing him to fall two laps down at one point in the race. Chase Elliott passed Martin Truex Jr. for the lead with 43 laps to go and would go on to win the race to advance to the Championship 4. Coming to the finish, Harvick needed one more point in order to advance to the Championship 4. On the last lap, Harvick attempted to pass Kyle Busch to gain that point but both cars wrecked coming to the finish line, and Harvick failed to advance to the Championship 4. Elliott, Joey Logano, Hamlin, and Brad Keselowski advanced to the Championship 4. Harvick, Truex Jr., Alex Bowman, and Kurt Busch were eliminated from the Playoffs.

Round 36: Season Finale 500

Chase Elliott was awarded the pole but had to drop to the rear at the beginning of the race after failing pre-race inspection multiple times. Joey Logano won the first stage of the race, while Elliott raced his way up to 3rd by the end of the first stage. Brad Keselowski won the second stage of the race. Elliott led the most laps of the race and would win the race and his first championship. Elliott was followed by fellow Championship 4 competitors Keselowski, Logano, and Denny Hamlin, with Jimmie Johnson rounding off the top 5 in his final race as a full-time Cup Series competitor.

== Results and standings ==
=== Race results ===
No.	Race	Pole position	Most laps led	Winning driver	Manufacturer	Report
	Busch Clash	Ryan Newman	Brad Keselowski	Erik Jones	Toyota	Report
	Bluegreen Vacations Duel 1	Ricky Stenhouse Jr.	Ricky Stenhouse Jr.	Joey Logano	Ford	Report
	Bluegreen Vacations Duel 2	Alex Bowman	Kevin Harvick	William Byron	Chevrolet	Report
1	Daytona 500	Ricky Stenhouse Jr.	Denny Hamlin	Denny Hamlin	Toyota	Report
2	Pennzoil 400	Kyle Busch	Kevin Harvick	Joey Logano	Ford	Report
3	Auto Club 400	Clint Bowyer	Alex Bowman	Alex Bowman	Chevrolet	Report
4	FanShield 500	Chase Elliott	Chase Elliott	Joey Logano	Ford	Report
5	The Real Heroes 400	Brad Keselowski	Kevin Harvick	Kevin Harvick	Ford	Report
6	Toyota 500	Ryan Preece	Clint Bowyer	Denny Hamlin	Toyota	Report
7	Coca-Cola 600	Kurt Busch	Alex Bowman	Brad Keselowski	Ford	Report
8	Alsco Uniforms 500	William Byron	Kevin Harvick	Chase Elliott	Chevrolet	Report
9	Food City presents the Supermarket Heroes 500	Brad Keselowski	Denny Hamlin	Brad Keselowski	Ford	Report
10	Folds of Honor QuikTrip 500	Chase Elliott	Kevin Harvick	Kevin Harvick	Ford	Report
11	Blue-Emu Maximum Pain Relief 500	Ryan Blaney	Joey Logano	Martin Truex Jr.	Toyota	Report
12	Dixie Vodka 400	Denny Hamlin	Denny Hamlin	Denny Hamlin	Toyota	Report
13	GEICO 500	Martin Truex Jr.	Ryan Blaney	Ryan Blaney	Ford	Report
14	Pocono Organics 325	Aric Almirola	Aric Almirola	Kevin Harvick	Ford	Report
15	Pocono 350	Ryan Preece	Denny Hamlin	Denny Hamlin	Toyota	Report
16	Big Machine Hand Sanitizer 400 powered by Big Machine Records	Joey Logano	Kevin Harvick	Kevin Harvick	Ford	Report
17	Quaker State 400	Kyle Busch	Aric Almirola	Cole Custer	Ford	Report
	NASCAR All Star Open	Michael McDowell	William Byron	Matt DiBenedetto	Ford	Report
	NASCAR All-Star Race	Martin Truex Jr.	Ryan Blaney	Chase Elliott	Chevrolet	Report
18	O'Reilly Auto Parts 500	Aric Almirola	Ryan Blaney	Austin Dillon	Chevrolet	Report
19	Super Start Batteries 400	Kevin Harvick	Denny Hamlin	Denny Hamlin	Toyota	Report
20	Foxwoods Resort Casino 301	Aric Almirola	Brad Keselowski	Brad Keselowski	Ford	Report
21	FireKeepers Casino 400	Joey Logano	Kevin Harvick	Kevin Harvick	Ford	Report
22	Consumers Energy 400	Chris Buescher	Kevin Harvick	Kevin Harvick	Ford	Report
23	Go Bowling 235	Kevin Harvick	Chase Elliott	Chase Elliott	Chevrolet	Report
24	Drydene 311 (Saturday)	Chase Elliott	Denny Hamlin	Denny Hamlin	Toyota	Report
25	Drydene 311 (Sunday)	Matt DiBenedetto	Kevin Harvick	Kevin Harvick	Ford	Report
26	Coke Zero Sugar 400	Kevin Harvick	Joey Logano	William Byron	Chevrolet	Report
NASCAR Cup Series Playoffs
Round of 16
27	Cook Out Southern 500	Chase Elliott	Martin Truex Jr.	Kevin Harvick	Ford	Report
28	Federated Auto Parts 400	Kevin Harvick	Brad Keselowski	Brad Keselowski	Ford	Report
29	Bass Pro Shops NRA Night Race	Brad Keselowski	Kevin Harvick	Kevin Harvick	Ford	Report
Round of 12
30	South Point 400	Kevin Harvick	Denny Hamlin	Kurt Busch	Chevrolet	Report
31	YellaWood 500	Denny Hamlin	Joey Logano	Denny Hamlin	Toyota	Report
32	Bank of America Roval 400	Denny Hamlin	William Byron; Chase Elliott (Tied)	Chase Elliott	Chevrolet	Report
Round of 8
33	Hollywood Casino 400	Chase Elliott	Kevin Harvick	Joey Logano	Ford	Report
34	Autotrader EchoPark Automotive 500	Kevin Harvick	Kyle Busch	Kyle Busch	Toyota	Report
35	Xfinity 500	Brad Keselowski	Chase Elliott	Chase Elliott	Chevrolet	Report
Championship 4
36	Season Finale 500	Chase Elliott	Chase Elliott	Chase Elliott	Chevrolet	Report

=== Drivers' championship ===
Legend: Results color-coding
Bold – Pole position awarded by time. Italics – Pole position set by final practice results, owner's points, previous race field inversion, random draw or competition-based formula.
* – Most laps led. ^{1} – Stage 1 winner. ^{2} – Stage 2 winner. ^{3} – Stage 3 winner. (Note: Stage 3 Winner only for Coca-Cola 600.) ^{1–10} - Regular season top 10 finishers.
. – Eliminated after Round of 16 . – Eliminated after Round of 12 . – Eliminated after Round of 8

Pos.	Driver	DAY	LVS	CAL	PHO	DAR	DAR	CLT	CLT	BRI	ATL	MAR	HOM	TAL	POC	POC	IND	KEN	TEX	KAN	NHA	MCH	MCH	DRC	DOV	DOV	DAY	DAR	RCH	BRI	LVS	TAL	ROV	KAN	TEX	MAR	PHO	Pts.	Stage	Bonus
1	Chase Elliott	17^{1}	26^{12}	4	**7***	4	38	2	1	22^{12}	8	5	2	38	25	4	11	23	12	12	9	7	9	1*^{1}	5	39	2	20	5	7^{1}	22^{2}	5	1*	6^{1}	20	1*^{2}	1*	5040	–	27^{7}
2	Brad Keselowski	36	7	5	11^{2}	13^{2}	4	1	7	1	9	3	10	19	9	11^{2}	4	9^{2}	9	2^{2}	1*^{2}	2	39	13	9	8	10	11	1*^{2}	34	13	18	18	4	6	4	2^{2}	5035	–	35^{3}
3	Joey Logano	26	1	12	1	18	6	13^{3}	6^{1}	21	10	4*^{1}	27	17	36^{1}	24	10	15	3	35	4	8	5	9	8	6	27*^{12}	3	3	11	14	26*	2	1	10	3	3^{1}	5034	–	22^{5}
4	Denny Hamlin	1*^{2}	17	6	20	5	1	29	2	17*	5	24	1*^{12}	4	2	1*	28	12	20	1*	2^{1}	6	2	2^{2}	1*^{12}	19	3	13	12^{1}	21	3*^{1}	1	15	15^{2}	9	11^{1}	4	5033	–	54^{2}
NASCAR Cup Series Playoffs cut-off
Pos.	Driver	DAY	LVS	CAL	PHO	DAR	DAR	CLT	CLT	BRI	ATL	MAR	HOM	TAL	POC	POC	IND	KEN	TEX	KAN	NHA	MCH	MCH	DRC	DOV	DOV	DAY	DAR	RCH	BRI	LVS	TAL	ROV	KAN	TEX	MAR	PHO	Pts.	Stage	Bonus
5	Kevin Harvick	5	8*	9	2^{1}	1*	3	5	10*	11	1*	15	26	10	1	2	1*^{2}	4	5	4	5	1*^{12}	1*^{2}	17	4	1*^{12}	20	1	7	1*	10	20	11	2*	16	17	7	2410	14	67^{1}
6	Alex Bowman	24	13	1*^{1}	14	2	18	19*^{12}	31^{2}	37	12	6	18	7	27	9	30	19	30	8	15	21	36	12	21	5	7	6	9	16	5	14	8	3	5	6	16	2371	35	9
7	Martin Truex Jr.	32	20	14	32	6	10	6	9	20	3^{12}	1	12	24	6	10	38	2	29	3	3	3	3	3	2	2	4	22*^{12}	2	24	4	23^{2}	7	9	2	22	10	2341	38	17^{4}
8	Kyle Busch	34	15	2	3	26	2	4	29	4	2	19	6	32	5	38	6	21	4	11^{1}	38	5	4	37	3	11	33	7	6	2^{2}	6	27	30	5	1*^{2}	9	11	2341	36	4^{9}
9	Ryan Blaney	2	11	19^{2}	37	16	21	3	3	40	4	2	3	1*	12	22	32	6	7*^{12}	20	20	4	38	31	14	12	6	24	19	13	7	25	5^{2}	7	4	2	6	2336	75	14^{6}
10	Kurt Busch	33	25	3	6	3	15	**7**	5	7	6	9	17	9	18	13^{1}	13	5	8	9	17	10	10	14	40	13	34	8	13	15	1	32	4	38	7	5	12	2287	14	6
11	Austin Dillon	12	4	24	36	11	20	14	8	6	11	37	7	39	19	14	18	13	1	27	13	31	8		15	9	25	2	4	12	32	12	19	11	11	23	18	2277	24	5
12	Clint Bowyer	6	12	**23**	5	17	22*^{12}	39	16	2	20	17	11	25	7	8	16	14	11	14	18	19	14^{1}	6	6	16	19	10	10	6	12	33	10	26	17^{1}	8	14	2254	20	4^{10}
13	Matt DiBenedetto	19	2	13	13	14	9	17	15	31	25	7	14	26	13	6	19	3	17	36	6	15	7	15	20	17	12	21	17	19	2	21	22	12	8	10	8	2249	19	–
14	William Byron	40	22	15	10	35^{1}	12	20	12	8	33	8	9	11	14	7	27^{1}	11	37	10	11	14	12	8	28	4	1	5	21	38	25	4	6*	8	13	35	9	2247	32	7
15	Aric Almirola	22	21	8	8	12	7	15	20	29	17	33	5	3	3*^{2}	5	3	8*^{1}	10	6	7	16	6	24	17	7	18	9	8	5	17	37	16	13	23	7	13	2235	–	5^{8}
16	Cole Custer **(R)**	37	19	18	9	22	31	12	18	35	19	29	22	22	16	17	5	1	39	7	8	34	25	22	11	10	30	12	14	23	16	31	9	14	14	13	28	2202	1	5
17	Erik Jones	18	23	10	28	8	5	11	26	5	28	20	21	5	38	3	33	22	6	5	24	11	27	11	12	22	35	4	22	3	8	2	3	20	21	12	22	873	108	–
18	Jimmie Johnson	35	5	7	12	38	8	40	11	3	7	10^{2}	16	13	21	16		18	26	32	12	12	11	4	7	3	17	18	31	17	11	29	13	31	36	30	5	836	131	1
19	Tyler Reddick **(R)**	28	18	11	33	7	13	8	14	36	16	16	4	20^{1}	30	35	8	10	2	13	10	18	24	18	13	18	29	23	11	4	38	7	12	25	15	24	19	780	75	1
20	Christopher Bell **(R)**	21	33	38	24	24	11	9	21	9	18	28	8	29	4	39	12	7	21	23	28	13	17	21	22	27	13	34	15	28	24	39	24	10	3	15	17	678	76	–
21	Chris Buescher	3	14	16	17	32	23	10	22	23	22	13	23	6	10	36	31	20	19	33	25	20	20	5	16	14	9	26	24	8	9	22^{1}	20	21	34	38	20	645	34	1
22	Bubba Wallace	15	6	27	19	21	16	38	37	10	21	11	13	14	22	20	9	27	14	37	23	9	21	25	27	21	5	38	26	22	28	24	21	18	38	21	15	597	20	–
23	Michael McDowell	14	36	22	16	23	17	18	25	14	24	14	15	18	8	40	7	24	15	16	19	29	28	10	26	25	14	16	25	10	21	36	32	19	26	28	23	588	5	–
24	Ricky Stenhouse Jr.	**20**	3	20	22	40	25	24	4	34	13	21	20	2^{2}	17	15	36	29	38	40	14	32	19	16	10	37	32	19	18	40	23	38	17	16	12	20	27	584	55	1
25	Ryan Newman	9				15	14	27	17	15	14	12	30	23	15	18	34	17	13	28	21	28	13	19	19	24	36	15	23	25	15	6	31	22	19	18	24	566	17	–
26	Ty Dillon	30	10	26	15	19	19	25	27	39	29	22	28	12	26	23	14	16	35	15	22	23	18	20	18	29	22	27	28	18	26	3	23^{1}	24	24	16	21	556	13	1
27	John Hunter Nemechek **(R)**	11	24	25	25	9	35	16	13	13	23	25	19	8	24	19	15	36	22	19	36	36	23	35	24	20	11	36	30	20	20	8	36	17	22	26	26	534	8	–
28	Matt Kenseth					10	30	26	23	16	15	23	25	40	11	12	2	25	18	17	37	17	15	26	23	15	28	14	16	14	18	16	34	40	39	14	25	521	9	–
29	Ryan Preece	29	37	30	18	20	39	22	24	12	26	26	24	15	20	25	40	38	40	34	16	25	16	23	25	26	37	17	20	9	19	10	14	29	18	19	34	477	16	–
30	Corey LaJoie	8	16	29	27	31	24	23	19	32	27	18	29	16	23	21	39	28	16	21	35	22	22	32	29	23	21	37	27	33	27	28	27	23	25	25	38	408	1	–
31	Daniel Suárez	DNQ	30	28	21	25	27	28	28	18	31	27	31	28	28	26	20	26	23	18	26	24	26	27	30	28	26	25	29	26	29	34	25	27	27	27	31	365	–	–
32	Brennan Poole **(R)**	16	29	32	31	27	37	30	38	24	30	30	32	35	29	27	35	31	27	30	27	37	30	28	36	30	15	28	33		30	9	37	28	28	37	29	269	–	–
33	Quin Houff **(R)**	39	32	35	34	36	26	35	32	27	32	34	33	27	40	31	23	35	34	24	32	27	32	33	33	34	23	31	32	29	34	13	28	33	33	33	39	214	–	–
34	Kyle Larson	10	9	21	4																																	121	9	–
35	Brendan Gaughan	7												21										39			8					35						78	–	–
36	Reed Sorenson	31	34	36	30	29					37	38							28	31		30	31		39	33			36	36				36	32			68	–	–
37	James Davison														34	30					30	38	37	30			39	39	37	35		30	29	32		36	33	56	–	–
38	Stanton Barrett																							38														1	–	–
Ineligible for driver points
Pos.	Driver	DAY	LVS	CAL	PHO	DAR	DAR	CLT	CLT	BRI	ATL	MAR	HOM	TAL	POC	POC	IND	KEN	TEX	KAN	NHA	MCH	MCH	DRC	DOV	DOV	DAY	DAR	RCH	BRI	LVS	TAL	ROV	KAN	TEX	MAR	PHO	Pts.	Stage	Bonus
	David Ragan	4																																						
	Kaz Grala																							7																
	Justin Haley	13																														11								
	Timmy Hill	27	38	37	38	33	33	34	33	19	39	39	34	33	35	29	29	37	36	38	33	33	35	29	34	36	24	35	38	37	37	15	38	34	30	29	36			
	Ross Chastain	25	27	17	23			21									17										16	29												
	Joey Gase	23	31	33	29	30	29	36	39	33	38	35	36	37	37	33	26	34	32	29	34	39			35	40	31	33	35	31	35	17		37	37	34	32			
	Cody Ware																															19								
	J. J. Yeley	DNQ	28	31	26	28	28	37	34	25	36	31	38	36	31	28	21	30	24	22	29	26	29	34^{†}	31	38	40	30	34	30	33		35	30	40	31	30			
	B. J. McLeod	38				39	36	32	35	28	40		35	31	39	37	22		33	39					38	31														
	Garrett Smithley		35	34	35	37	34	33	40	26	35	36		34	33	32	24	33		26	31	35	34	36	37	35				32					31	39	37			
	Josh Bilicki					34			36		34		37		32	34	25	32	31	25			33		32	32	38	32		39	36		33	35	29	32	35			
	Gray Gaulding						32	31	30	30				30					25											27	31		26							
	David Starr											32																												
	Chad Finchum	DNQ																													39			39	35					
	Justin Allgaier																37																							
	Bayley Currey									38																														
Pos.	Driver	DAY	LVS	CAL	PHO	DAR	DAR	CLT	CLT	BRI	ATL	MAR	HOM	TAL	POC	POC	IND	KEN	TEX	KAN	NHA	MCH	MCH	DRC	DOV	DOV	DAY	DAR	RCH	BRI	LVS	TAL	ROV	KAN	TEX	MAR	PHO	Pts.	Stage	Bonus
^{†} – Due to the extreme heat, J. J. Yeley did not run the full race at the Daytona Road Course and was relieved by Bayley Currey just before the caution for lightning. Since Yeley started the race, he is officially credited with the 34th-place finish.

=== Manufacturers' championship ===
Pos	Manufacturer	Wins	Points
1	Ford	18	1329
2	Toyota	9	1258
3	Chevrolet	9	1232

== See also ==
- 2020 NASCAR Xfinity Series
- 2020 NASCAR Gander RV & Outdoors Truck Series
- 2020 ARCA Menards Series
- 2020 ARCA Menards Series East
- 2020 ARCA Menards Series West
- 2020 NASCAR Whelen Modified Tour
- 2020 NASCAR Pinty's Series
- 2020 NASCAR Whelen Euro Series
- 2020 eNASCAR iRacing Pro Invitational Series
- 2020 EuroNASCAR Esports Series
