= Richard Boswell =

American racing driver and crew chief

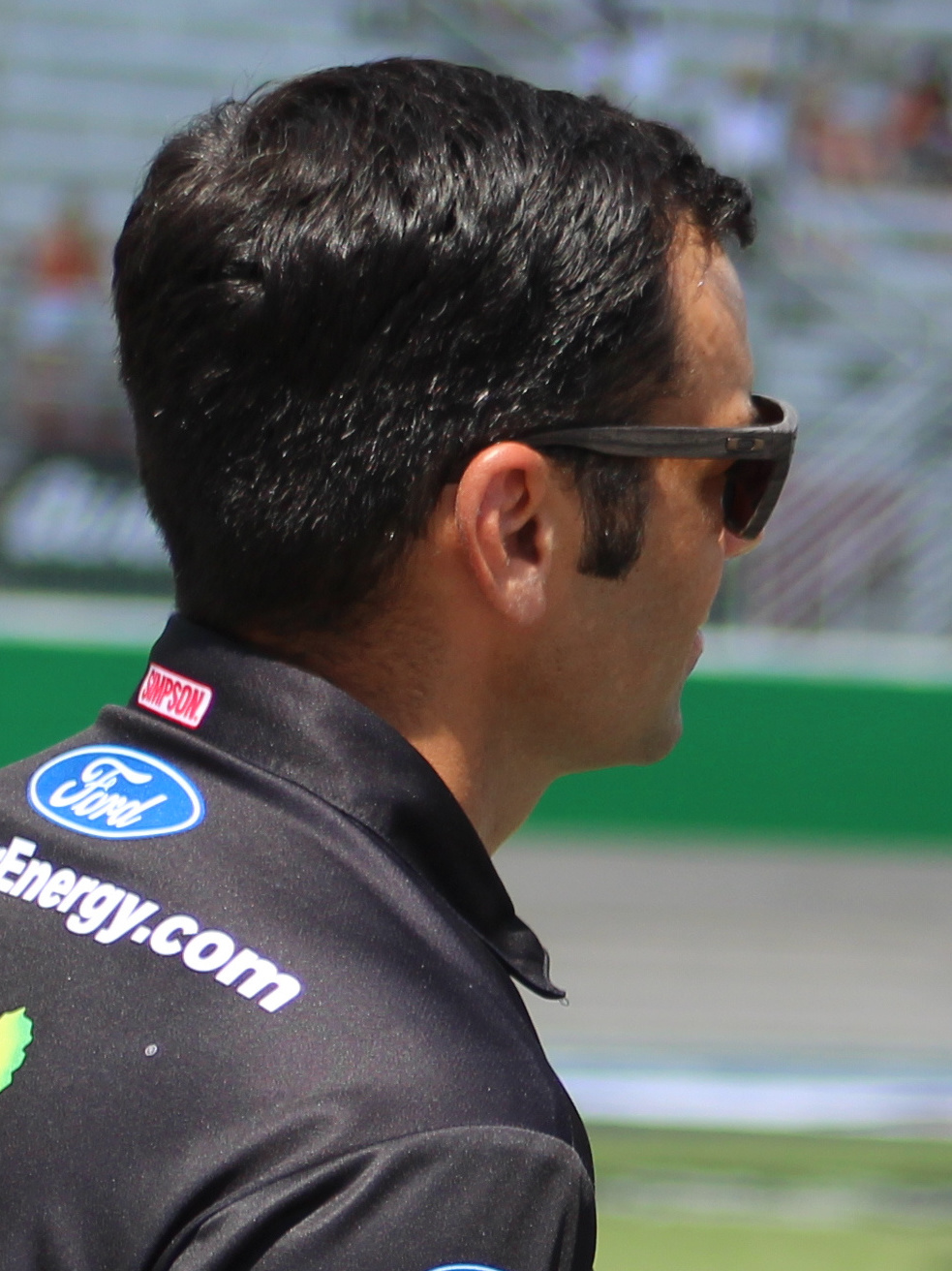
- Boswell at Atlanta Motor Speedway in 2021
- Born: Richard Warner Boswell II; April 14, 1984 (age 42); West Friendship, Maryland, U.S.

NASCAR O'Reilly Auto Parts Series career
- 1 race run over 1 year
- 2009 position: 133rd
- Best finish: 133rd (2009)
- First race: 2009 Kroger On Track for the Cure 250 (Memphis)
Wins	Top tens	Poles
0	0	0
- Statistics up to date as of February 25, 2023.

Richard Warner Boswell II (born April 14, 1984) is an American former professional stock car racing driver and crew chief who works for Richard Childress Racing as the crew chief of their No. 3 Chevrolet Camaro ZL1 in the NASCAR Cup Series driven by Austin Dillon. He previously crew chiefed the Stewart–Haas Racing No. 98 car in the Xfinity Series driven by Chase Briscoe and Riley Herbst. He previously drove in the Xfinity Series in one race in 2009 for JR Motorsports.

== Racing career ==
=== Driving career ===
The son of former NASCAR Busch Series driver Dickie Boswell, Richard Boswell was selected to replace driver Shane Huffman in the USAR Hooters Pro Cup. He won the World Karting National Championship in 1998, and captured the World Karting Grand National Championship in the same year (at Lowe's Motor Speedway). He is also a former late model driver at Old Dominion Speedway, in Manassas, Virginia.

Boswell's one and only start in NASCAR as a driver came in the Nationwide Series (now NASCAR O'Reilly Auto Parts Series) in the No. 5 for JR Motorsports at Memphis. It was a standalone race for the series, and that car, which was mostly driven by Cup Series drivers that year, needed a different driver with the Cup Series racing at Martinsville that same weekend. Boswell qualified an impressive third in his debut and finished 23rd in the race. It ended up being his only NASCAR race as a driver, since he never got another chance to drive again for JRM or any other team in the series after that.

=== Crew chiefing career ===
Boswell joined Stewart–Haas Racing in 2017, where he served as a crew chief for their upstart Xfinity Series program. He crew chiefed the part-time No. 41 Ford driven by Kevin Harvick in his part-time schedule of races in the series that year. He was also the interim crew chief that year for Clint Bowyer's No. 14 SHR team in the Cup Series for the race at Texas in November after Mike Bugarewicz was suspended.

The following year, SHR expanded their NXS team even further, with them merging with the Biagi Brothers Racing No. 98 team. In turn, the No. 41 was closed down for 2018 and the Biagi No. 98 was fielded as SHR's second car. After this, Boswell moved over to that car, replacing Jon Hansen as its crew chief. He crew chiefed Harvick again, as well as Aric Almirola (another one of SHR's Cup drivers who had driven for Biagi before the SHR merger), and Chase Briscoe, a Ford development driver who was running part-time for them as well as Roush Fenway Racing. Boswell led the No. 98 team to two wins that year, with Harvick at Atlanta and Briscoe at the Charlotte Roval. When the car ran the full season in 2019 with Briscoe, Boswell continued as the team's crew chief, and has remained in that position ever since.

On June 13, 2020, following the Hooters 250 at Homestead–Miami Speedway, Boswell, car chief Nick Hutchins, and engineer D. J. Vanderley were suspended for four races after a tungsten ballast came loose and fell off the frame rail of the car during the start of the race. SHR competition director Greg Zipadelli would serve as the interim crew chief for Briscoe and the No. 98 for the next four races.

After a remarkable nine-win season for Briscoe in 2020, Boswell moved up to the Cup Series, where he replaced Clint Bowyer in SHR's No. 14 car. Boswell did not move with Briscoe to that team and remained in the Xfinity Series, continuing to crew chief the No. 98, now driven by Riley Herbst, who moved over from the No. 18 for Joe Gibbs Racing.

On June 20, 2023, it was announced that Boswell would move from the No. 98 car in the Xfinity Series to SHR's No. 14 Cup Series car where he would reunite with Briscoe. He replaced Johnny Klausmeier, who was serving a six race suspension at the time and would move to a position in SHR's vehicle production department after his suspension ended.

On November 20, 2024, Richard Childress Racing signed Boswell as the crew chief of the No. 3 car, driven by Austin Dillon, for the 2025 season.

== Personal life ==
Boswell currently lives in Mooresville, North Carolina.

Despite sharing the same last name, he is not related to driver Brady Boswell.

== Motorsports career results ==
=== NASCAR ===
(key) (Bold – Pole position awarded by qualifying time. Italics – Pole position earned by points standings or practice time. * – Most laps led.)

==== Nationwide Series ====
NASCAR Nationwide Series results
Year	Team	No.	Make	1	2	3	4	5	6	7	8	9	10	11	12	13	14	15	16	17	18	19	20	21	22	23	24	25	26	27	28	29	30	31	32	33	34	35	NNSC	Pts	Ref
2009	JR Motorsports	5	Chevy	DAY	CAL	LVS	BRI	TEX	NSH	PHO	TAL	RCH	DAR	CLT	DOV	NSH	KEN	MLW	NHA	DAY	CHI	GTY	IRP	IOW	GLN	MCH	BRI	CGV	ATL	RCH	DOV	KAN	CAL	CLT	MEM; 23	TEX	PHO	HOM	133rd	94	
