= 2020 Busch Clash =

2020 Advance Auto Parts Clash
Race details
- Race 1 of 2 exhibition races in the 2020 NASCAR Cup Series
- Date: February 9, 2020
- Location: Daytona International Speedway in Daytona Beach, Florida
- Course: Permanent racing facility
- Course length: 2.5 miles (4 km)
- Distance: 88 laps, 220 mi (352 km)
- Scheduled distance: 75 laps, 187.5 mi (300 km)
- Average speed: 134.9 miles per hour (217.1 km/h)

Pole position
Driver	Ryan Newman	Roush Fenway Racing
- Time: N/A

Most laps led
Driver	Brad Keselowski	Team Penske
- Laps: 33

Winner
No. 20	Erik Jones	Joe Gibbs Racing

Television in the United States
- Network: FS1
- Announcers: Mike Joy and Jeff Gordon
- Nielsen ratings: 2.455 million

Radio in the United States
- Radio: MRN
- Booth announcers: Alex Hayden, Jeff Striegle, and Rusty Wallace
- Turn announcers: Dave Moody (1 & 2), Mike Bagley (Backstretch) and Kyle Rickey (3 & 4)

The 2020 Busch Clash was a NASCAR Cup Series race held on February 9, 2020 at Daytona International Speedway in Daytona Beach, Florida. Contested over 88 laps — extended from 75 laps due to an overtime finish, it was the first exhibition race of the 2020 NASCAR Cup Series season. The race was won by Erik Jones, one of only six cars still running after a series of crashes late in the race, gaining the race the nickname of "Busch Crash" for that reason.

This ended up being the last Clash race in its traditional form; the event moved to the road course for 2021 (originally planned as the last race for the Generation 6 car; the car was used for the entire season instead) and then to the Los Angeles Memorial Coliseum in 2022.

== Report ==
=== Background ===
Daytona International Speedway, where the race is held.

The track, Daytona International Speedway, is one of six superspeedways to hold NASCAR races, the others being Michigan International Speedway, Auto Club Speedway, Indianapolis Motor Speedway, Pocono Raceway, and Talladega Superspeedway. The standard track at Daytona International Speedway is a four–turn superspeedway that is 2.5-mile (4.0 km) The track's turns are banked at 31 degrees, while the front stretch, the location of the finish line, is banked at 18 degrees.

=== Format and eligibility ===
The race is 75 laps in length, and is divided into two segments; the first is 25 laps and the second is 50 laps. The race is open to those drivers who won a pole in the 2019 season or had won "The Clash" previously.

The 2020 Busch Clash will not be a predetermined number of cars; rather, the field is limited to drivers who meet more exclusive criteria. Only drivers who were 2019 Pole Award winners, former Clash race winners, former Daytona 500 champions, former Daytona 500 pole winners who competed full–time in 2019 and drivers who qualified for the 2019 Playoffs are eligible.

== Entry list ==
Eighteen drivers were confirmed to be participating in this event. Although Daniel Hemric and Daniel Suárez were eligible to run the event, they chose not to run with Hemric moving back to the NASCAR Xfinity Series and Suarez focusing in preparing for the 2020 Daytona 500.

No.	Driver	Team	Manufacturer
1	Kurt Busch	Chip Ganassi Racing	Chevrolet
2	Brad Keselowski	Team Penske	Ford
3	Austin Dillon	Richard Childress Racing	Chevrolet
4	Kevin Harvick	Stewart-Haas Racing	Ford
6	Ryan Newman	Roush Fenway Racing	Ford
9	Chase Elliott	Hendrick Motorsports	Chevrolet
10	Aric Almirola	Stewart-Haas Racing	Ford
11	Denny Hamlin	Joe Gibbs Racing	Toyota
12	Ryan Blaney	Team Penske	Ford
14	Clint Bowyer	Stewart-Haas Racing	Ford
18	Kyle Busch	Joe Gibbs Racing	Toyota
19	Martin Truex Jr.	Joe Gibbs Racing	Toyota
20	Erik Jones	Joe Gibbs Racing	Toyota
22	Joey Logano	Team Penske	Ford
24	William Byron	Hendrick Motorsports	Chevrolet
42	Kyle Larson	Chip Ganassi Racing	Chevrolet
48	Jimmie Johnson	Hendrick Motorsports	Chevrolet
88	Alex Bowman	Hendrick Motorsports	Chevrolet
Official entry list

== Practice ==
Erik Jones was the fastest in the final practice session with a time of 45.055 seconds and a speed of 199.756 mph (321.476 km/h).

Pos	No.	Driver	Team	Manufacturer	Time	Speed
1	20	Erik Jones	Joe Gibbs Racing	Toyota	45.055	199.756
2	11	Denny Hamlin	Joe Gibbs Racing	Toyota	45.060	199.734
3	19	Martin Truex Jr.	Joe Gibbs Racing	Toyota	45.067	199.703
Official final practice results

== Starting lineup ==
The lineup was determined by random draw, with Ryan Newman drawing the top spot.

Pos	No	Driver	Team	Manufacturer
1	6	Ryan Newman	Roush Fenway Racing	Ford
2	2	Brad Keselowski	Team Penske	Ford
3	19	Martin Truex Jr.	Joe Gibbs Racing	Toyota
4	42	Kyle Larson	Chip Ganassi Racing	Chevrolet
5	10	Aric Almirola	Stewart-Haas Racing	Ford
6	14	Clint Bowyer	Stewart-Haas Racing	Ford
7	24	William Byron	Hendrick Motorsports	Chevrolet
8	88	Alex Bowman	Hendrick Motorsports	Chevrolet
9	18	Kyle Busch	Joe Gibbs Racing	Toyota
10	4	Kevin Harvick	Stewart-Haas Racing	Ford
11	9	Chase Elliott	Hendrick Motorsports	Chevrolet
12	20	Erik Jones	Joe Gibbs Racing	Toyota
13	22	Joey Logano	Team Penske	Ford
14	12	Ryan Blaney	Team Penske	Ford
15	3	Austin Dillon	Richard Childress Racing	Chevrolet
16	48	Jimmie Johnson	Hendrick Motorsports	Chevrolet
17	1	Kurt Busch	Chip Ganassi Racing	Chevrolet
18	11	Denny Hamlin	Joe Gibbs Racing	Toyota
Official starting lineup

== Race results ==
=== Box score ===
Pos	Grid	No	Driver	Team	Manufacturer	Laps	Status
1	12	20	Erik Jones	Joe Gibbs Racing	Toyota Camry	88	1:37:51
2	15	3	Austin Dillon	Richard Childress Racing	Chevrolet Camaro	88	-.697 seconds
3	6	14	Clint Bowyer	Stewart-Haas Racing	Ford Mustang	88	Running
4	4	42	Kyle Larson	Chip Ganassi Racing	Chevrolet Camaro	88	Running
5	1	6	Ryan Newman	Roush Fenway Racing	Ford Mustang	88	Running
6	18	11	Denny Hamlin	Joe Gibbs Racing	Toyota Camry	87	-1 lap
7	11	9	Chase Elliott	Hendrick Motorsports	Chevrolet Camaro	82	Accident
8	14	12	Ryan Blaney	Team Penske	Ford Mustang	78	Accident
9	13	22	Joey Logano	Team Penske	Ford Mustang	78	Accident
10	5	10	Aric Almirola	Stewart-Haas Racing	Ford Mustang	77	Accident
11	16	48	Jimmie Johnson	Hendrick Motorsports	Chevrolet Camaro	77	Accident
12	17	1	Kurt Busch	Chip Ganassi Racing	Chevrolet Camaro	77	Accident
13	10	4	Kevin Harvick	Stewart-Haas Racing	Ford Mustang	77	Accident
14	7	24	William Byron	Hendrick Motorsports	Chevrolet Camaro	74	Accident
15	8	88	Alex Bowman	Hendrick Motorsports	Chevrolet Camaro	74	Accident
16	3	19	Martin Truex Jr.	Joe Gibbs Racing	Toyota Camry	72	Accident
17	2	2	Brad Keselowski	Team Penske	Ford Mustang	66	Accident
18	9	18	Kyle Busch	Joe Gibbs Racing	Toyota Camry	65	Accident
Official race results

=== Statistics ===
Cautions: 5 for 21 laps
From Lap	To Lap	Total Laps	Reason
27	30	4	Competition
67	72	6	#'s 22 (Logano), 2 (Keselowski), 12 (Blaney), 48 (Johnson), 11 (Hamlin), & 18 (Ky.Busch), Crash T4
74	77	4	#'s 19 (Truex Jr.), 24 (Byron), 6 (Newman), 42 (Larson), 4 (Harvick), 1 (Ku.Busch), 12 (Blaney), 14 (Boywer), 88 (Bowman), & 20 (Jones), Crash tri-oval
79	82	4	#'s 11 (Hamlin), 9 (Elliott), 1 (Ku.Busch), 48 (Johnson), 22 (Logano), 12 (Blaney), 14 (Bowyer), 10 (Almirola), 3 (A.Dillon), 20 (Jones), & 4 (Harvick), Crash T4 (Red flag 7:27)
84	86	3	#'s 42 (Larson), 9 (Elliott), & 20 (Jones), Crash T4

Lap Leaders
From Lap	To Lap	Total Laps	Driver
1	2	2	Ryan Newman
3	9	7	Martin Truex Jr.
10	24	15	Brad Keselowski
25	28	4	Ryan Newman
29	46	18	Brad Keselowski
47	50	4	William Bryon
51	52	2	Kyle Larson
53	56	4	Chase Elliott
57	58	2	Alex Bowman
59	65	7	Joey Logano
66	77	12	Denny Hamlin
78	80	3	Chase Elliott
81	86	6	Austin Dillon
87	87	1	Ryan Newman
88	88	1	Erik Jones

== Media ==
FS1 covered the race on the television side; Mike Joy and Jeff Gordon handled the call in the booth for the race; Michael Waltrip, Vince Welch and Matt Yocum handled pit road for the television side.

=== Television ===
A total of 2.46 million people watched the race, which earned it a 1.57 rating. This rating was 15% higher than the 2019 Clash.

FS1
Booth announcers	Pit reporters
Lap-by-lap: Mike Joy; Color-commentator: Jeff Gordon	Michael Waltrip; Vince Welch; Matt Yocum

=== Radio ===
MRN Radio
Booth announcers	Turn announcers	Pit reporters
Lead announcer: Alex Hayden; Announcer: Jeff Striegle; Announcer: Rusty Wallace	Turns 1 & 2: Dave Moody; Backstretch: Mike Bagley; Turns 3 & 4: Kyle Rickey	Winston Kelley; Steve Post; Dillon Welch; Kim Coon
