= Mike Bugarewicz =

American NASCAR crew chief (born 1982)

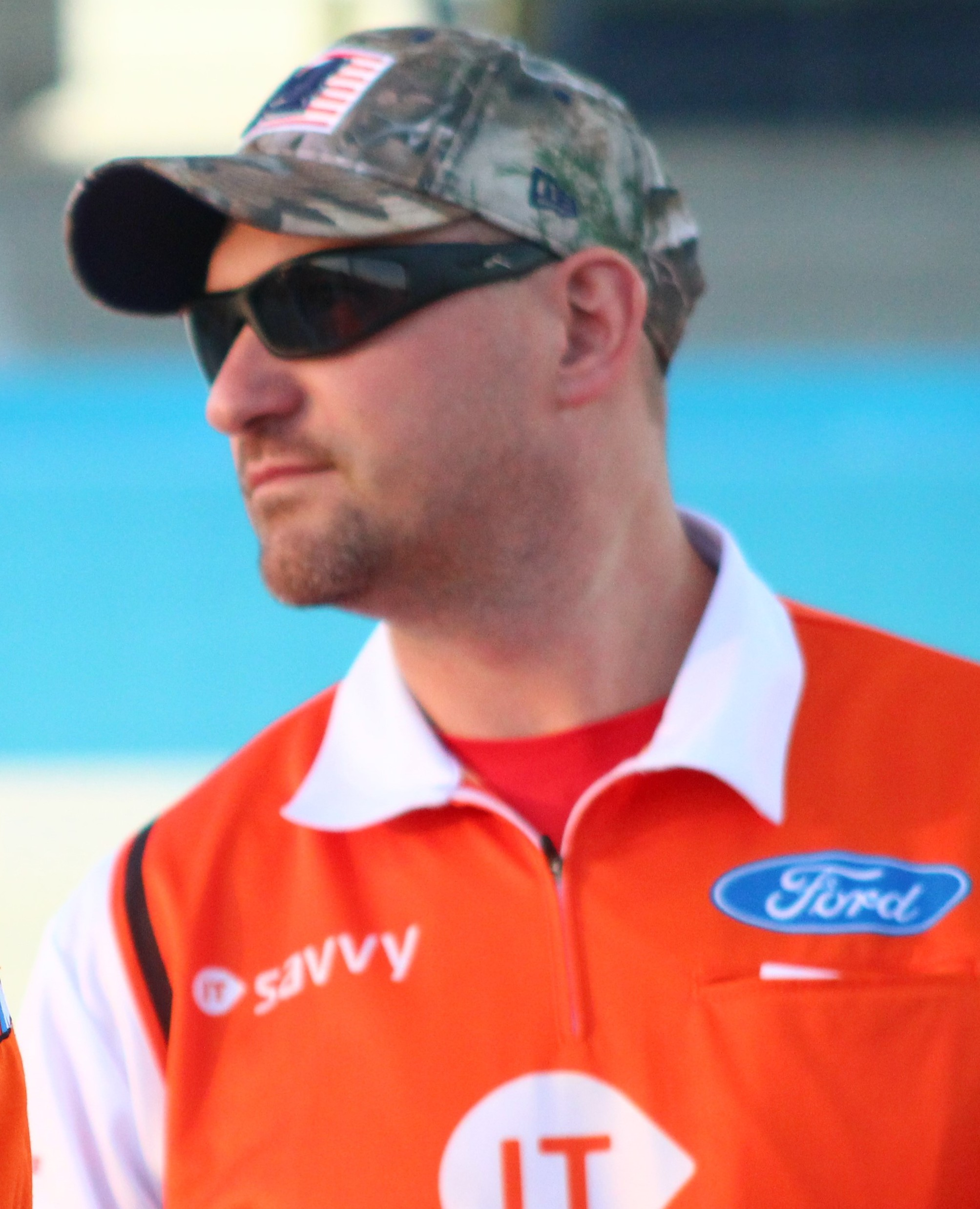
- Bugarewicz at ISM Raceway in 2018

Personal information
- Full name: Michael Matthew Bugarewicz
- Born: January 22, 1982 (age 44) Lehighton, Pennsylvania, U.S.
- Education: Penn State University
- Occupation: Interim crew chief
- Years active: 2016-present

Sport
- Country: United States
- Sport: Motor racing
- League: NASCAR Cup Series

Michael Matthew Bugarewicz (pronounced "bug-uh-rav-itch"; born January 22, 1982), nicknamed "Buga", is an American former NASCAR team executive who worked for Stewart–Haas Racing (SHR) as their performance director. He formerly served as their interim crew chief for their No. 14 car in the NASCAR Cup Series driven by Chase Briscoe. He previously served as the permanent crew chief of that car from 2016 to 2019 when it was driven by Tony Stewart and Clint Bowyer as well as from 2020 to 2021 on their No. 10 car driven by Aric Almirola.

== Racing career ==
Prior to being a crew chief, Bugarewicz was the engineer for Kevin Harvick's No. 4 team at SHR, where he won the 2014 championship with him as well as a second-place points finish in 2015, which included a remarkable thirteen second-place race finishes and 28 top-ten race finishes for Harvick and the team that year. He currently serves as director of performance for SHR. In 2016, he was promoted to crew chief for SHR's No. 14 team, where he worked with Tony Stewart in 2016 and Clint Bowyer from 2017 to 2019. In 2020, he became the crew chief for SHR's No. 10 Ford Mustang driven by Aric Almirola for SHR in a swap with Johnny Klausmeier, who moved from the No. 10 car to the No. 14 car. He was promoted to Performance Director for SHR in 2022.

On May 31, 2023, NASCAR issued an L3 penalty to Chase Briscoe and the No. 14 Stewart–Haas Racing team after a counterfeit part was found on the car after it was taken to the NASCAR R&D Center after the Coca-Cola 600. Crew chief Johnny Klausmeier was suspended for the next six races (Gateway, Sonoma, Nashville, the Chicago Street Course, Atlanta and New Hampshire) The team decided not to appeal the penalty and Bugarewicz returned to crew chief for SHR for Briscoe in these six races.
