= Johnny Klausmeier =

American NASCAR crew chief

John Klausmeier
Personal information
- Born: John Henry Klausmeier; February 1, 1981 (age 45) Perry Hall, Maryland, U.S.
- Occupations: Race team executive, crew chief, engineer

Sport
- Sport: Motor racing
- Team: 23XI Racing

John Henry Klausmeier (born February 1, 1981) is an American NASCAR crew chief who works for 23XI Racing as the team's Technical Director. He previously was employed at Stewart–Haas Racing, working as an engineer, crew chief and in their Vehicle Performance Group, and Richard Childress Racing as their Technical Director.

== Racing career ==
=== 2009–2024: Stewart–Haas Racing ===
Klausmeier joined SHR in 2009, working as a crew member on the No. 39 car driven by Ryan Newman under crew chief Tony Gibson. He and some other crew members followed Gibson over from Dale Earnhardt, Inc. to SHR when DEI merged into Chip Ganassi Racing following the 2008 season and they reduced teams as part of the merger. Gibson served as crew chief of the team's No. 8 car driven by Mark Martin and Aric Almirola in 2008 and Klausmeier worked under Gibson on that team.

Klausmeier made his crew chiefing debut in an interim role in the summer Pocono race in 2016 for Kurt Busch, which he won. He also served as Kurt Busch's interim crew chief in 2017. He also served as Aric Almirola's crew chief from 2018 to 2020 where he won one race with Almirola. Klausmeier became Busch's interim crew chief in 2016 following the suspension of his original crew chief, Tony Gibson. Klausmeier also worked as a race engineer for the team.

After Clint Bowyer's retirement from driving in NASCAR full-time and move to TV as a color commentator for NASCAR on Fox, Klausmeier would continue as crew chief of the SHR No. 14 car, now driven by Chase Briscoe, in his rookie year in the Cup Series in 2021.

On May 31, 2023, following the 2023 Coca-Cola 600, NASCAR issued an L3 penalty on the No. 14 after a post-race inspection revealed a counterfeit engine panel NACA duct; as a result, the team was docked 125 owner and driver points and 25 playoff points, and Klausmeier was suspended for six races and fined US$250,000.

On June 20, 2023, it was announced that Richard Boswell would be taking over for Chase Briscoe for the rest of the season, while Klausmeier would be moved over to the part of the company's vehicle performance group after his suspension was over.

In his three year tenure as Briscoe's crew chief, Klausmeier led him to one win, nine top -fives, and 17 top-tens, including a 2022 playoff berth where they made it all the way to the Round of 8.

=== 2025–2026: Richard Childress Racing ===
When SHR closed down after the 2024 season, Klausmeier was hired by Richard Childress Racing to serve in the same role of Technical Director with their team. Boswell would also follow Klausmeier to RCR and serve as the new crew chief for Austin Dillon's No. 3 car.

In 2026, Klausmeier returned to crew chiefing in the Cup Series race at Pocono, filling in for Andy Street as the interim crew chief of RCR's No. 33 car driven by Austin Hill. This was his first time crew chiefing for RCR since he joined the team.

=== 2027–present: 23XI Racing ===
In November 2026, it was announced that Klausmeier would leave RCR to go to 23XI Racing to work as their Technical Director beginning in 2027.
