= 2021 Foxwoods Resort Casino 301 =

NASCAR Cup Series race

Race details
- Race 22 of 36 in the 2021 NASCAR Cup Series
- Date: July 18, 2021
- Location: New Hampshire Motor Speedway in Loudon, New Hampshire
- Course: Permanent racing facility
- Course length: 1.058 miles (1.703 km)
- Distance: 293 laps, 309.994 mi (498.887 km)
- Scheduled distance: 301 laps, 318.458 mi (512.508 km)
- Average speed: 99.004 miles per hour (159.331 km/h)

Pole position
Driver	Kyle Busch	Joe Gibbs Racing
- Grid positions set by competition-based formula

Most laps led
Driver	Kevin Harvick	Stewart-Haas Racing
- Laps: 66

Winner
No. 10	Aric Almirola	Stewart-Haas Racing

Television in the United States
- Network: NBCSN
- Announcers: Dale Earnhardt Jr., Jeff Burton and Steve Letarte

Radio in the United States
- Radio: PRN
- Booth announcers: Doug Rice and Mark Garrow
- Turn announcers: Rob Albright (1 & 2) and Pat Patterson (3 & 4)

The 2021 Foxwoods Resort Casino 301 was a NASCAR Cup Series race held on July 18, 2021, at New Hampshire Motor Speedway in Loudon, New Hampshire. Originally scheduled for 301 laps, the race was shortened to 293 laps due to darkness. on the 1.058-mile (1.703 km) speedway. It was the 22nd race of the 2021 NASCAR Cup Series season. Aric Almirola led the last 28 laps to take a surprise victory, the third of his NASCAR Cup Series career, and his first on a non superspeedway.

== Report ==
=== Background ===
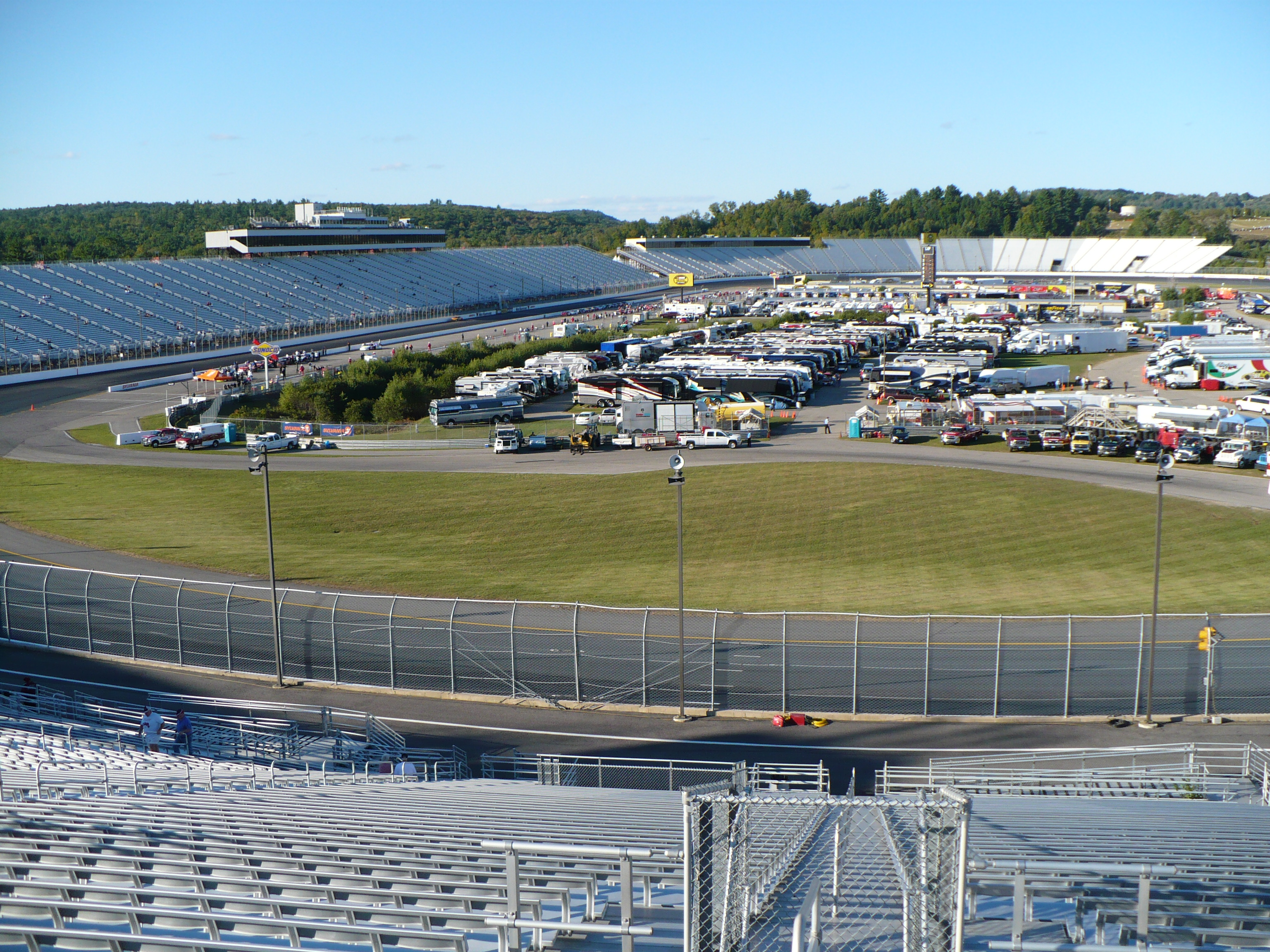
New Hampshire Motor Speedway, the track where the race was held.

New Hampshire Motor Speedway is a 1.058-mile (1.703 km) oval speedway located in Loudon, New Hampshire, which has hosted NASCAR racing annually since the early 1990s, as well as the longest-running motorcycle race in North America, the Loudon Classic. Nicknamed "The Magic Mile", the speedway is often converted into a 1.6-mile (2.6 km) road course, which includes much of the oval.

The track was originally the site of Bryar Motorsports Park before being purchased and redeveloped by Bob Bahre. The track is currently one of eight major NASCAR tracks owned and operated by Speedway Motorsports.

==== Entry list ====
- (R) denotes rookie driver.
- (i) denotes driver who are ineligible for series driver points.

No.	Driver	Team	Manufacturer
00	Quin Houff	StarCom Racing	Chevrolet
1	Kurt Busch	Chip Ganassi Racing	Chevrolet
2	Brad Keselowski	Team Penske	Ford
3	Austin Dillon	Richard Childress Racing	Chevrolet
4	Kevin Harvick	Stewart-Haas Racing	Ford
5	Kyle Larson	Hendrick Motorsports	Chevrolet
6	Ryan Newman	Roush Fenway Racing	Ford
7	Corey LaJoie	Spire Motorsports	Chevrolet
8	Tyler Reddick	Richard Childress Racing	Chevrolet
9	Chase Elliott	Hendrick Motorsports	Chevrolet
10	Aric Almirola	Stewart-Haas Racing	Ford
11	Denny Hamlin	Joe Gibbs Racing	Toyota
12	Ryan Blaney	Team Penske	Ford
14	Chase Briscoe (R)	Stewart-Haas Racing	Ford
15	James Davison	Rick Ware Racing	Chevrolet
17	Chris Buescher	Roush Fenway Racing	Ford
18	Kyle Busch	Joe Gibbs Racing	Toyota
19	Martin Truex Jr.	Joe Gibbs Racing	Toyota
20	Christopher Bell	Joe Gibbs Racing	Toyota
21	Matt DiBenedetto	Wood Brothers Racing	Ford
22	Joey Logano	Team Penske	Ford
23	Bubba Wallace	23XI Racing	Toyota
24	William Byron	Hendrick Motorsports	Chevrolet
34	Michael McDowell	Front Row Motorsports	Ford
37	Ryan Preece	JTG Daugherty Racing	Chevrolet
38	Anthony Alfredo (R)	Front Row Motorsports	Ford
41	Cole Custer	Stewart-Haas Racing	Ford
42	Ross Chastain	Chip Ganassi Racing	Chevrolet
43	Erik Jones	Richard Petty Motorsports	Chevrolet
47	Ricky Stenhouse Jr.	JTG Daugherty Racing	Chevrolet
48	Alex Bowman	Hendrick Motorsports	Chevrolet
51	Cody Ware (i)	Petty Ware Racing	Chevrolet
52	Josh Bilicki	Rick Ware Racing	Ford
53	Garrett Smithley (i)	Rick Ware Racing	Chevrolet
77	Justin Haley (i)	Spire Motorsports	Chevrolet
78	B. J. McLeod (i)	Live Fast Motorsports	Ford
99	Daniel Suárez	Trackhouse Racing Team	Chevrolet
Official entry list

== Qualifying ==
Kyle Busch was awarded the pole for the race as determined by competition-based formula.

=== Starting Lineup ===
Pos	No.	Driver	Team	Manufacturer
1	18	Kyle Busch	Joe Gibbs Racing	Toyota
2	19	Martin Truex Jr.	Joe Gibbs Racing	Toyota
3	9	Chase Elliott	Hendrick Motorsports	Chevrolet
4	1	Kurt Busch	Chip Ganassi Racing	Chevrolet
5	48	Alex Bowman	Hendrick Motorsports	Chevrolet
6	11	Denny Hamlin	Joe Gibbs Racing	Toyota
7	12	Ryan Blaney	Team Penske	Ford
8	8	Tyler Reddick	Richard Childress Racing	Chevrolet
9	20	Christopher Bell	Joe Gibbs Racing	Toyota
10	5	Kyle Larson	Hendrick Motorsports	Chevrolet
11	2	Brad Keselowski	Team Penske	Ford
12	4	Kevin Harvick	Stewart-Haas Racing	Ford
13	3	Austin Dillon	Richard Childress Racing	Chevrolet
14	21	Matt DiBenedetto	Wood Brothers Racing	Ford
15	22	Joey Logano	Team Penske	Ford
16	24	William Byron	Hendrick Motorsports	Chevrolet
17	17	Chris Buescher	Roush Fenway Racing	Ford
18	23	Bubba Wallace	23XI Racing	Toyota
19	14	Chase Briscoe (R)	Stewart-Haas Racing	Ford
20	42	Ross Chastain	Chip Ganassi Racing	Chevrolet
21	41	Cole Custer	Stewart-Haas Racing	Ford
22	10	Aric Almirola	Stewart-Haas Racing	Ford
23	34	Michael McDowell	Front Row Motorsports	Ford
24	43	Erik Jones	Richard Petty Motorsports	Chevrolet
25	37	Ryan Preece	JTG Daugherty Racing	Chevrolet
26	7	Corey LaJoie	Spire Motorsports	Chevrolet
27	38	Anthony Alfredo (R)	Front Row Motorsports	Ford
28	6	Ryan Newman	Roush Fenway Racing	Ford
29	47	Ricky Stenhouse Jr.	JTG Daugherty Racing	Chevrolet
30	77	Justin Haley (i)	Spire Motorsports	Chevrolet
31	99	Daniel Suárez	Trackhouse Racing Team	Chevrolet
32	78	B. J. McLeod (i)	Live Fast Motorsports	Ford
33	53	Garrett Smithley (i)	Rick Ware Racing	Chevrolet
34	51	Cody Ware (i)	Petty Ware Racing	Chevrolet
35	52	Josh Bilicki	Rick Ware Racing	Ford
36	00	Quin Houff	StarCom Racing	Chevrolet
37	15	James Davison	Rick Ware Racing	Chevrolet
Official starting lineup

== Race ==
=== Stage Results ===
Stage One Laps: 75

Pos	No	Driver	Team	Manufacturer	Points
1	12	Ryan Blaney	Team Penske	Ford	10
2	2	Brad Keselowski	Team Penske	Ford	9
3	9	Chase Elliott	Hendrick Motorsports	Chevrolet	8
4	4	Kevin Harvick	Stewart-Haas Racing	Ford	7
5	8	Tyler Reddick	Richard Childress Racing	Chevrolet	6
6	20	Christopher Bell	Joe Gibbs Racing	Toyota	5
7	11	Denny Hamlin	Joe Gibbs Racing	Toyota	4
8	42	Ross Chastain	Chip Ganassi Racing	Chevrolet	3
9	21	Matt DiBenedetto	Wood Brothers Racing	Ford	2
10	5	Kyle Larson	Hendrick Motorsports	Chevrolet	1
Official stage one results

Stage Two Laps: 110

Pos	No	Driver	Team	Manufacturer	Points
1	2	Brad Keselowski	Team Penske	Ford	10
2	4	Kevin Harvick	Stewart-Haas Racing	Ford	9
3	12	Ryan Blaney	Team Penske	Ford	8
4	11	Denny Hamlin	Joe Gibbs Racing	Toyota	7
5	10	Aric Almirola	Stewart-Haas Racing	Ford	6
6	9	Chase Elliott	Hendrick Motorsports	Chevrolet	5
7	5	Kyle Larson	Hendrick Motorsports	Chevrolet	4
8	8	Tyler Reddick	Richard Childress Racing	Chevrolet	3
9	42	Ross Chastain	Chip Ganassi Racing	Chevrolet	2
10	1	Kurt Busch	Chip Ganassi Racing	Chevrolet	1
Official stage two results

=== Final Stage Results ===
Stage Three Laps: 116

Pos	Grid	No	Driver	Team	Manufacturer	Laps	Points
1	22	10	Aric Almirola	Stewart-Haas Racing	Ford	293	46
2	9	20	Christopher Bell	Joe Gibbs Racing	Toyota	293	40
3	11	2	Brad Keselowski	Team Penske	Ford	293	53
4	15	22	Joey Logano	Team Penske	Ford	293	33
5	7	12	Ryan Blaney	Team Penske	Ford	293	50
6	12	4	Kevin Harvick	Stewart-Haas Racing	Ford	293	47
7	10	5	Kyle Larson	Hendrick Motorsports	Chevrolet	293	35
8	20	42	Ross Chastain	Chip Ganassi Racing	Chevrolet	293	34
9	5	48	Alex Bowman	Hendrick Motorsports	Chevrolet	293	3
10	6	11	Denny Hamlin	Joe Gibbs Racing	Toyota	293	38
11	14	21	Matt DiBenedetto	Wood Brothers Racing	Ford	293	28
12	2	19	Martin Truex Jr.	Joe Gibbs Racing	Toyota	293	25
13	8	8	Tyler Reddick	Richard Childress Racing	Chevrolet	293	33
14	21	41	Cole Custer	Stewart-Haas Racing	Ford	293	23
15	29	47	Ricky Stenhouse Jr.	JTG Daugherty Racing	Chevrolet	293	22
16	4	1	Kurt Busch	Chip Ganassi Racing	Chevrolet	292	22
17	13	3	Austin Dillon	Richard Childress Racing	Chevrolet	292	20
18	3	9	Chase Elliott	Hendrick Motorsports	Chevrolet	292	7
19	24	43	Erik Jones	Richard Petty Motorsports	Chevrolet	292	18
20	31	99	Daniel Suárez	Trackhouse Racing Team	Chevrolet	292	17
21	16	24	William Byron	Hendrick Motorsports	Chevrolet	292	16
22	25	37	Ryan Preece	JTG Daugherty Racing	Chevrolet	292	15
23	26	7	Corey LaJoie	Spire Motorsports	Chevrolet	292	14
24	28	6	Ryan Newman	Roush Fenway Racing	Ford	292	13
25	23	34	Michael McDowell	Front Row Motorsports	Ford	292	12
26	18	23	Bubba Wallace	23XI Racing	Toyota	292	11
27	19	14	Chase Briscoe (R)	Stewart-Haas Racing	Ford	291	10
28	30	77	Justin Haley (i)	Spire Motorsports	Chevrolet	291	0
29	17	17	Chris Buescher	Roush Fenway Racing	Ford	290	8
30	32	78	B. J. McLeod (i)	Live Fast Motorsports	Ford	288	0
31	34	51	Cody Ware (i)	Petty Ware Racing	Chevrolet	285	0
32	27	38	Anthony Alfredo (R)	Front Row Motorsports	Ford	285	5
33	33	53	Garrett Smithley (i)	Rick Ware Racing	Chevrolet	283	0
34	35	52	Josh Bilicki	Rick Ware Racing	Ford	280	3
35	36	00	Quin Houff	StarCom Racing	Chevrolet	187	2
36	37	15	James Davison	Rick Ware Racing	Chevrolet	40	1
37	1	18	Kyle Busch	Joe Gibbs Racing	Toyota	8	1
Official race results

NOTE: On Lap 284, NASCAR announced ten laps remaining, shortening the race to 293 laps because of a rain delay earlier in the race. This was the last time this specific rule was used, as NASCAR replaced both the ten laps remaining rule and the race shortening rule where officials can shorten the race for weather, darkness, or curfew was replaced by time-certain finishes in 2024.

NOTE: The 9 and 48 teams were penalised 25 points each on July 22, 2021, by NASCAR for an engine violation. Teams are limited to 20 engines during the Cup Series season, as eight full engines, known as long blocks, and eight short blocks, consisting of the engine block, connecting rod, pistons, crankshaft, and camshaft, must be sealed and reused for a second race. As reported by Fox Sports' Bob Pockrass, special rules are in place when a team wins a race. Such race winning engine is marked by a car number, and can only be reused by the same team that used the engine in the race win. At this event, the 48 team used an engine previously raced by the 9 team at either Austin or Road America. By rule, because it was a race winning engine, only the 9 team can reuse that sealed engine. The infraction was discovered when the 48 engine in question was inspected and the 9 car tab was found.

=== Race statistics ===
- Lead changes: 14 among 10 different drivers
- Cautions/Laps: 6 for 37
- Red flags: 1 for 1 hour, 41 minutes and 22 seconds
- Time of race: 3 hours, 7 minutes and 52 seconds
- Average speed: 99.004 miles per hour (159.331 km/h)

== Race recap ==
Kyle Busch would jump to the lead on the start with Truex Jr. following. Throughout the start, light rain started to increase into heavier rain. In an accident similar to the start of the 2001 The Winston, on lap 6 rain picked up heavily in Turn 1, causing the leaders including Kyle Busch. Truex Jr., and Hamlin to all spin and collect damage. As rain picked up even further, NASCAR decided to stop the race on lap 293. Aric Almirola would win. The race did not run the full 301 laps due to sunset.

== Media ==
=== Television ===
NBC Sports covered the race on the television side. Dale Earnhardt Jr., four-time and all-time Loudon winner Jeff Burton and Steve Letarte called the race from the broadcast booth. Marty Snider and Dillon Welch handled the pit road duties from pit lane.

NBCSN
Booth announcers	Pit reporters
Lap-by-lap: Dale Earnhardt Jr. Color-commentator: Jeff Burton; Color-commentator: Steve Letarte	Marty Snider; Dillon Welch

=== Radio ===
PRN had the radio call for the race, which was also simulcast on Sirius XM NASCAR Radio. Doug Rice and Mark Garrow called the race from the booth when the field races down the frontstretch. Rob Albright called the race from turns 1 & 2 and Pat Patterson called the race from turns 3 & 4. Brad Gillie, Brett McMillan and Alan Cavanna handled the duties on pit lane.

PRN
Booth announcers	Turn announcers	Pit reporters
Lead announcer: Doug Rice; Announcer: Mark Garrow	Turns 1 & 2: Rob Albright; Turns 3 & 4: Pat Patterson	Brad Gillie; Brett McMillan; Alan Cavanna

== Standings after the race ==
Drivers' Championship standings

	Pos	Driver	Points
	1	Denny Hamlin	874
	2	Kyle Larson	861 (–13)
1	3	William Byron	749 (–125)
1	4	Kyle Busch	740 (–134)
1	5	Joey Logano	733 (–141)
1	6	Chase Elliott	711 (–163)
	7	Martin Truex Jr.	696 (–178)
	8	Ryan Blaney	689 (–185)
1	9	Brad Keselowski	676 (–198)
1	10	Kevin Harvick	673 (–201)
	11	Alex Bowman	612 (–262)
1	12	Tyler Reddick	596 (–278)
1	13	Austin Dillon	591 (–283)
	14	Kurt Busch	552 (–322)
	15	Christopher Bell	532 (–342)
	16	Chris Buescher	475 (–399)
Official driver's standings

Manufacturers' Championship standings

	Pos	Manufacturer	Points
	1	Chevrolet	812
1	2	Ford	758 (–54)
1	3	Toyota	755 (–57)

- Note: Only the first 16 positions are included for the driver standings. Points reflect penalties assessed on July 22, 2021.
- . – Driver has clinched a position in the NASCAR Cup Series playoffs.

Previous race: 2021 Quaker State 400	NASCAR Cup Series; 2021 season	Next race: 2021 Go Bowling at The Glen
