= 2021 Federated Auto Parts 400 =

2021 Federated Auto Parts 400 Salute to First Responders
Race details
- Race 28 of 36 in the 2021 NASCAR Cup Series
- Date: September 11, 2021
- Location: Richmond Raceway in Richmond, Virginia
- Course: Permanent racing facility
- Course length: .75 miles (1.2 km)
- Distance: 400 laps, 300 mi (480 km)
- Average speed: 98.307 miles per hour (158.210 km/h)

Pole position
Driver	Kyle Larson	Hendrick Motorsports
- Grid positions set by competition-based formula

Most laps led
Driver	Denny Hamlin	Joe Gibbs Racing
- Laps: 197

Winner
No. 19	Martin Truex Jr.	Joe Gibbs Racing

Television in the United States
- Network: NBCSN
- Announcers: Rick Allen, Jeff Burton, Steve Letarte and Dale Earnhardt Jr.

Radio in the United States
- Radio: MRN
- Booth announcers: Alex Hayden, Jeff Striegle and Rusty Wallace
- Turn announcers: Dave Moody (Backstretch)

The 2021 Federated Auto Parts 400 Salute to First Responders was a NASCAR Cup Series race held on September 11, 2021 at Richmond Raceway in Richmond, Virginia. Contested over 400 laps on the .75-mile (1.21 km) D-shaped short track, it was the 28th race of the 2021 NASCAR Cup Series season, second race of the Playoffs and second race of the Round of 16.

Martin Truex Jr. overcame an early drive-through penalty for jumping the start to win the race. Kyle Larson's sixth place ensured he would join Truex and Denny Hamlin in the round of 12.

== Report ==
=== Background ===
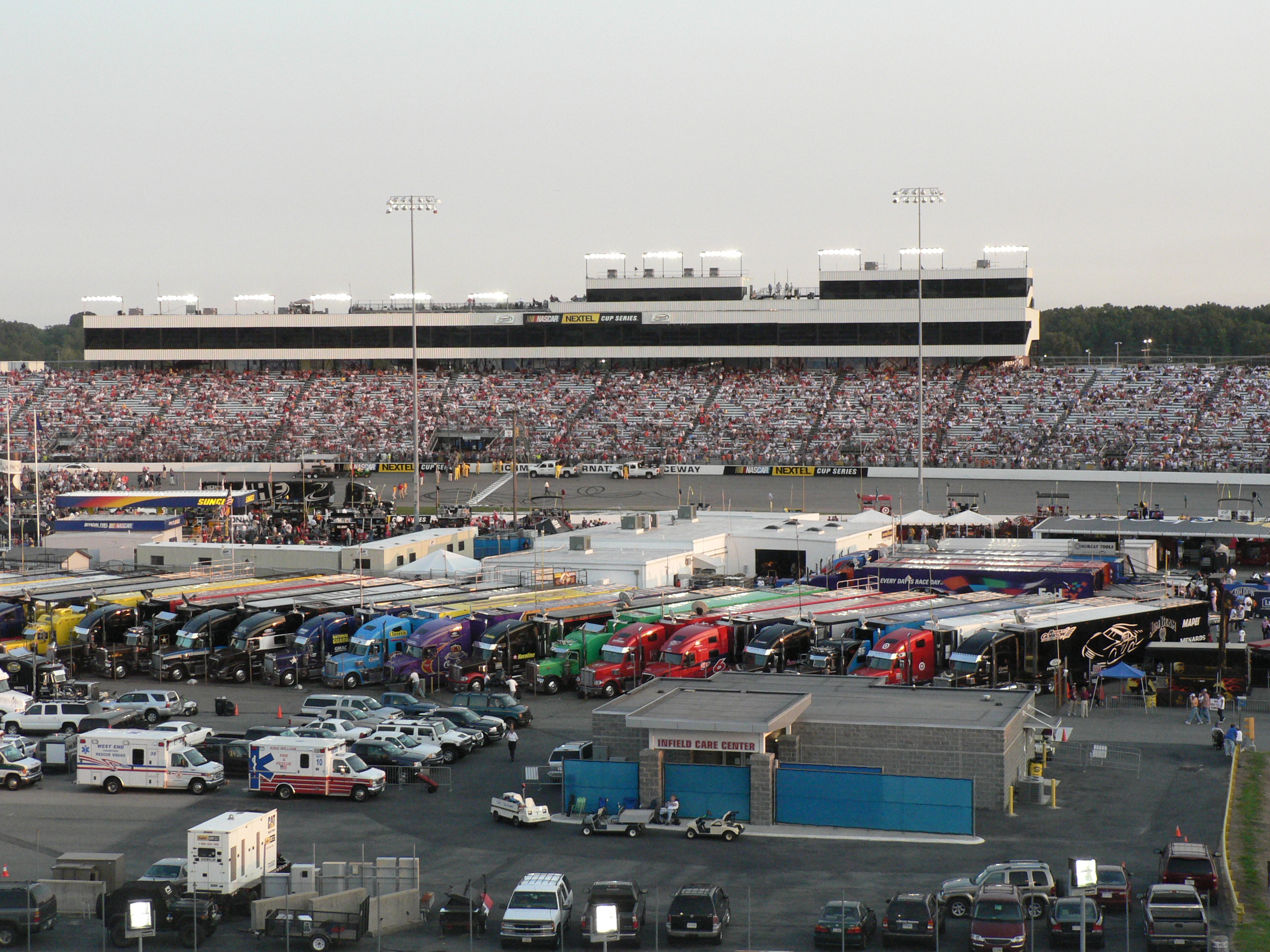
Richmond Raceway, the track where the race was held.

The 2021 Federated Auto Parts 400 program cover.

Richmond Raceway (RR), formerly known as Richmond International Raceway (RIR), is a 3/4-mile (1.2 km), D-shaped, asphalt race track located just outside Richmond, Virginia in Henrico County. It hosts the NASCAR Cup Series, the NASCAR Xfinity Series, NASCAR Camping World Truck Series and the IndyCar series. Known as "America's premier short track", it formerly hosted two USAC sprint car races.

==== Entry list ====
- (R) denotes rookie driver.
- (i) denotes driver who are ineligible for series driver points.

No.	Driver	Team	Manufacturer
00	Quin Houff	StarCom Racing	Chevrolet
1	Kurt Busch	Chip Ganassi Racing	Chevrolet
2	Brad Keselowski	Team Penske	Ford
3	Austin Dillon	Richard Childress Racing	Chevrolet
4	Kevin Harvick	Stewart-Haas Racing	Ford
5	Kyle Larson	Hendrick Motorsports	Chevrolet
6	Ryan Newman	Roush Fenway Racing	Ford
7	Corey LaJoie	Spire Motorsports	Chevrolet
8	Tyler Reddick	Richard Childress Racing	Chevrolet
9	Chase Elliott	Hendrick Motorsports	Chevrolet
10	Aric Almirola	Stewart-Haas Racing	Ford
11	Denny Hamlin	Joe Gibbs Racing	Toyota
12	Ryan Blaney	Team Penske	Ford
14	Chase Briscoe (R)	Stewart-Haas Racing	Ford
15	Joey Gase (i)	Rick Ware Racing	Chevrolet
17	Chris Buescher	Roush Fenway Racing	Ford
18	Kyle Busch	Joe Gibbs Racing	Toyota
19	Martin Truex Jr.	Joe Gibbs Racing	Toyota
20	Christopher Bell	Joe Gibbs Racing	Toyota
21	Matt DiBenedetto	Wood Brothers Racing	Ford
22	Joey Logano	Team Penske	Ford
23	Bubba Wallace	23XI Racing	Toyota
24	William Byron	Hendrick Motorsports	Chevrolet
34	Michael McDowell	Front Row Motorsports	Ford
37	Ryan Preece	JTG Daugherty Racing	Chevrolet
38	Anthony Alfredo (R)	Front Row Motorsports	Ford
41	Cole Custer	Stewart-Haas Racing	Ford
42	Ross Chastain	Chip Ganassi Racing	Chevrolet
43	Erik Jones	Richard Petty Motorsports	Chevrolet
47	Ricky Stenhouse Jr.	JTG Daugherty Racing	Chevrolet
48	Alex Bowman	Hendrick Motorsports	Chevrolet
51	Garrett Smithley (i)	Petty Ware Racing	Chevrolet
52	Josh Bilicki	Rick Ware Racing	Ford
53	J. J. Yeley (i)	Rick Ware Racing	Chevrolet
77	Justin Haley (i)	Spire Motorsports	Chevrolet
78	B. J. McLeod (i)	Live Fast Motorsports	Ford
99	Daniel Suárez	Trackhouse Racing Team	Chevrolet
Official entry list

== Qualifying ==
Kyle Larson was awarded the pole for the race as determined by competition-based formula.

=== Starting Lineup ===
Pos	No.	Driver	Team	Manufacturer
1	5	Kyle Larson	Hendrick Motorsports	Chevrolet
2	11	Denny Hamlin	Joe Gibbs Racing	Toyota
3	19	Martin Truex Jr.	Joe Gibbs Racing	Toyota
4	1	Kurt Busch	Chip Ganassi Racing	Chevrolet
5	4	Kevin Harvick	Stewart-Haas Racing	Ford
6	22	Joey Logano	Team Penske	Ford
7	2	Brad Keselowski	Team Penske	Ford
8	12	Ryan Blaney	Team Penske	Ford
9	10	Aric Almirola	Stewart-Haas Racing	Ford
10	20	Christopher Bell	Joe Gibbs Racing	Toyota
11	8	Tyler Reddick	Richard Childress Racing	Chevrolet
12	48	Alex Bowman	Hendrick Motorsports	Chevrolet
13	9	Chase Elliott	Hendrick Motorsports	Chevrolet
14	24	William Byron	Hendrick Motorsports	Chevrolet
15	18	Kyle Busch	Joe Gibbs Racing	Toyota
16	34	Michael McDowell	Front Row Motorsports	Ford
17	42	Ross Chastain	Chip Ganassi Racing	Chevrolet
18	17	Chris Buescher	Roush Fenway Racing	Ford
19	3	Austin Dillon	Richard Childress Racing	Chevrolet
20	37	Ryan Preece	JTG Daugherty Racing	Chevrolet
21	41	Cole Custer	Stewart-Haas Racing	Ford
22	99	Daniel Suárez	Trackhouse Racing Team	Chevrolet
23	47	Ricky Stenhouse Jr.	JTG Daugherty Racing	Chevrolet
24	6	Ryan Newman	Roush Fenway Racing	Ford
25	7	Corey LaJoie	Spire Motorsports	Chevrolet
26	14	Chase Briscoe (R)	Stewart-Haas Racing	Ford
27	23	Bubba Wallace	23XI Racing	Toyota
28	21	Matt DiBenedetto	Wood Brothers Racing	Ford
29	77	Justin Haley (i)	Spire Motorsports	Chevrolet
30	38	Anthony Alfredo (R)	Front Row Motorsports	Ford
31	43	Erik Jones	Richard Petty Motorsports	Chevrolet
32	78	B. J. McLeod (i)	Live Fast Motorsports	Ford
33	52	Josh Bilicki	Rick Ware Racing	Ford
34	15	Joey Gase (i)	Rick Ware Racing	Chevrolet
35	00	Quin Houff	StarCom Racing	Chevrolet
36	51	Garrett Smithley (i)	Petty Ware Racing	Chevrolet
37	53	J. J. Yeley (i)	Rick Ware Racing	Chevrolet
Official starting lineup

== Race ==
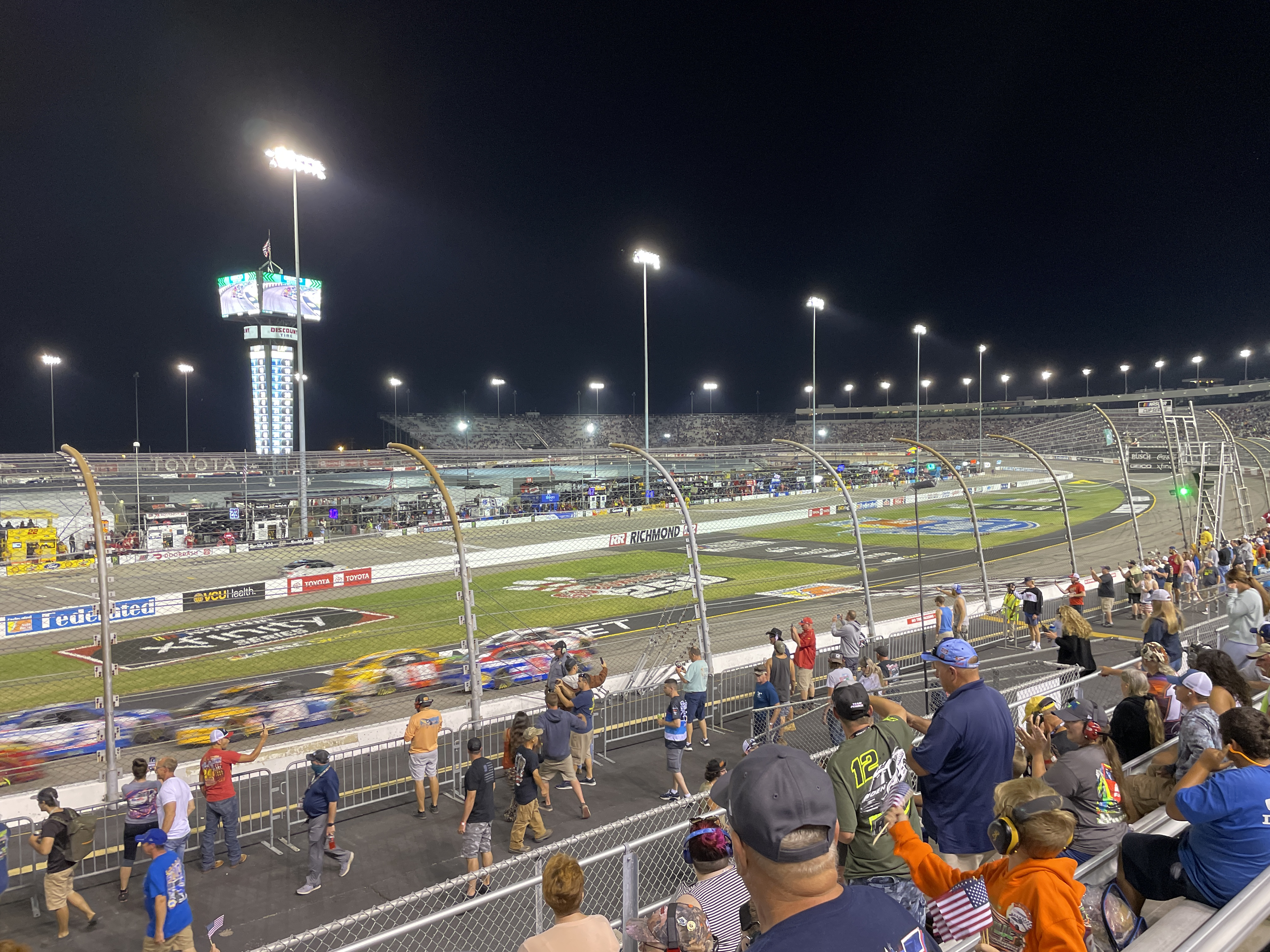
Denny Hamlin leads the field following a restart

=== Stage Results ===
Stage One Laps: 80

Pos	No	Driver	Team	Manufacturer	Points
1	11	Denny Hamlin	Joe Gibbs Racing	Toyota	10
2	9	Chase Elliott	Hendrick Motorsports	Chevrolet	9
3	22	Joey Logano	Team Penske	Ford	8
4	5	Kyle Larson	Hendrick Motorsports	Chevrolet	7
5	12	Ryan Blaney	Team Penske	Ford	6
6	42	Ross Chastain	Chip Ganassi Racing	Chevrolet	5
7	2	Brad Keselowski	Team Penske	Ford	4
8	19	Martin Truex Jr.	Joe Gibbs Racing	Toyota	3
9	4	Kevin Harvick	Stewart-Haas Racing	Ford	2
10	10	Aric Almirola	Stewart-Haas Racing	Ford	1
Official stage one results

Stage Two Laps: 155

Pos	No	Driver	Team	Manufacturer	Points
1	11	Denny Hamlin	Joe Gibbs Racing	Toyota	10
2	18	Kyle Busch	Joe Gibbs Racing	Toyota	9
3	19	Martin Truex Jr.	Joe Gibbs Racing	Toyota	8
4	5	Kyle Larson	Hendrick Motorsports	Chevrolet	7
5	22	Joey Logano	Team Penske	Ford	6
6	20	Christopher Bell	Joe Gibbs Racing	Toyota	5
7	42	Ross Chastain	Chip Ganassi Racing	Chevrolet	4
8	10	Aric Almirola	Stewart-Haas Racing	Ford	3
9	48	Alex Bowman	Hendrick Motorsports	Chevrolet	2
10	4	Kevin Harvick	Stewart-Haas Racing	Ford	1
Official stage two results

=== Final Stage Results ===
Stage Three Laps: 165

Pos	Grid	No	Driver	Team	Manufacturer	Laps	Points
1	3	19	Martin Truex Jr.	Joe Gibbs Racing	Toyota	400	51
2	2	11	Denny Hamlin	Joe Gibbs Racing	Toyota	400	55
3	10	20	Christopher Bell	Joe Gibbs Racing	Toyota	400	39
4	13	9	Chase Elliott	Hendrick Motorsports	Chevrolet	400	42
5	6	22	Joey Logano	Team Penske	Ford	400	46
6	1	5	Kyle Larson	Hendrick Motorsports	Chevrolet	400	45
7	17	42	Ross Chastain	Chip Ganassi Racing	Chevrolet	400	39
8	5	4	Kevin Harvick	Stewart-Haas Racing	Ford	400	32
9	15	18	Kyle Busch	Joe Gibbs Racing	Toyota	400	37
10	8	12	Ryan Blaney	Team Penske	Ford	399	33
11	19	3	Austin Dillon	Richard Childress Racing	Chevrolet	399	26
12	12	48	Alex Bowman	Hendrick Motorsports	Chevrolet	399	27
13	7	2	Brad Keselowski	Team Penske	Ford	399	28
14	9	10	Aric Almirola	Stewart-Haas Racing	Ford	399	27
15	11	8	Tyler Reddick	Richard Childress Racing	Chevrolet	398	22
16	26	14	Chase Briscoe (R)	Stewart-Haas Racing	Ford	398	21
17	22	99	Daniel Suárez	Trackhouse Racing Team	Chevrolet	398	20
18	28	21	Matt DiBenedetto	Wood Brothers Racing	Ford	398	19
19	14	24	William Byron	Hendrick Motorsports	Chevrolet	398	18
20	24	6	Ryan Newman	Roush Fenway Racing	Ford	398	17
21	31	43	Erik Jones	Richard Petty Motorsports	Chevrolet	398	16
22	21	41	Cole Custer	Stewart-Haas Racing	Ford	397	15
23	23	47	Ricky Stenhouse Jr.	JTG Daugherty Racing	Chevrolet	397	14
24	18	17	Chris Buescher	Roush Fenway Racing	Ford	396	13
25	20	37	Ryan Preece	JTG Daugherty Racing	Chevrolet	396	12
26	30	38	Anthony Alfredo (R)	Front Row Motorsports	Ford	396	11
27	29	77	Justin Haley (i)	Spire Motorsports	Chevrolet	396	0
28	16	34	Michael McDowell	Front Row Motorsports	Ford	395	9
29	25	7	Corey LaJoie	Spire Motorsports	Chevrolet	395	8
30	32	78	B. J. McLeod (i)	Live Fast Motorsports	Ford	393	0
31	36	51	Garrett Smithley (i)	Petty Ware Racing	Chevrolet	389	0
32	27	23	Bubba Wallace	23XI Racing	Toyota	388	5
33	34	15	Joey Gase (i)	Rick Ware Racing	Chevrolet	387	0
34	37	53	J. J. Yeley (i)	Rick Ware Racing	Chevrolet	386	0
35	35	00	Quin Houff	StarCom Racing	Chevrolet	386	2
36	33	52	Josh Bilicki	Rick Ware Racing	Ford	385	1
37	4	1	Kurt Busch	Chip Ganassi Racing	Chevrolet	40	1
Official race results

=== Race statistics ===
- Lead changes: 21 among 8 different drivers
- Cautions/Laps: 5 for 30
- Red flags: 0
- Time of race: 3 hours, 3 minutes and 6 seconds
- Average speed: 98.307 miles per hour (158.210 km/h)

== Media ==
=== Television ===
NBC Sports covered the race on the television side. Rick Allen, Jeff Burton, Steve Letarte and three-time Richmond winner Dale Earnhardt Jr. called the race from the broadcast booth. Parker Kligerman, Marty Snider and Dillon Welch handled the pit road duties from pit lane.

NBCSN
Booth announcers	Pit reporters
Lap-by-lap: Rick Allen; Color-commentator: Jeff Burton; Color-commentator: Steve Letarte; Color-commentator: Dale Earnhardt Jr.	Parker Kligerman; Marty Snider; Dillon Welch

=== Radio ===
The Motor Racing Network had the radio call for the race, which was also simulcast on Sirius XM NASCAR Radio. Alex Hayden, Jeff Striegle and Rusty Wallace called the race from the broadcast booth for MRN when the field races through the front straightaway. Dave Moody called the race from a platform when the field races down the backstraightaway. Steve Post and Kim Coon called the action for MRN from pit lane.

MRN Radio
Booth announcers	Turn announcers	Pit reporters
Lead announcer: Alex Hayden; Announcer: Jeff Striegle; Announcer: Rusty Wallace	Backstretch: Dave Moody	Steve Post; Kim Coon

== Standings after the race ==
Drivers' Championship standings

	Pos	Driver	Points
	1	Kyle Larson	2,151
	2	Denny Hamlin	2,127 (–24)
	3	Martin Truex Jr.	2,113 (–38)
2	4	Joey Logano	2,093 (–58)
	5	Ryan Blaney	2,081 (–70)
1	6	Kevin Harvick	2,078 (–73)
3	7	Chase Elliott	2,072 (–79)
1	8	Christopher Bell	2,070 (–81)
1	9	Brad Keselowski	2,066 (–85)
4	10	Kyle Busch	2,061 (–90)
	11	Aric Almirola	2,056 (–95)
8	12	Kurt Busch	2,053 (–98)
	13	Alex Bowman	2,053 (–98)
2	14	Tyler Reddick	2,048 (–103)
	15	William Byron	2,035 (–116)
	16	Michael McDowell	2,015 (–136)
Official driver's standings

Manufacturers' Championship standings

Pos	Manufacturer	Points
1	Chevrolet	1,028
2	Ford	966 (–62)
3	Toyota	960 (–68)

- Note: Only the first 16 positions are included for the driver standings.

Previous race: 2021 Cook Out Southern 500	NASCAR Cup Series; 2021 season	Next race: 2021 Bass Pro Shops NRA Night Race
