= Quin Houff =

American stock car racing driver

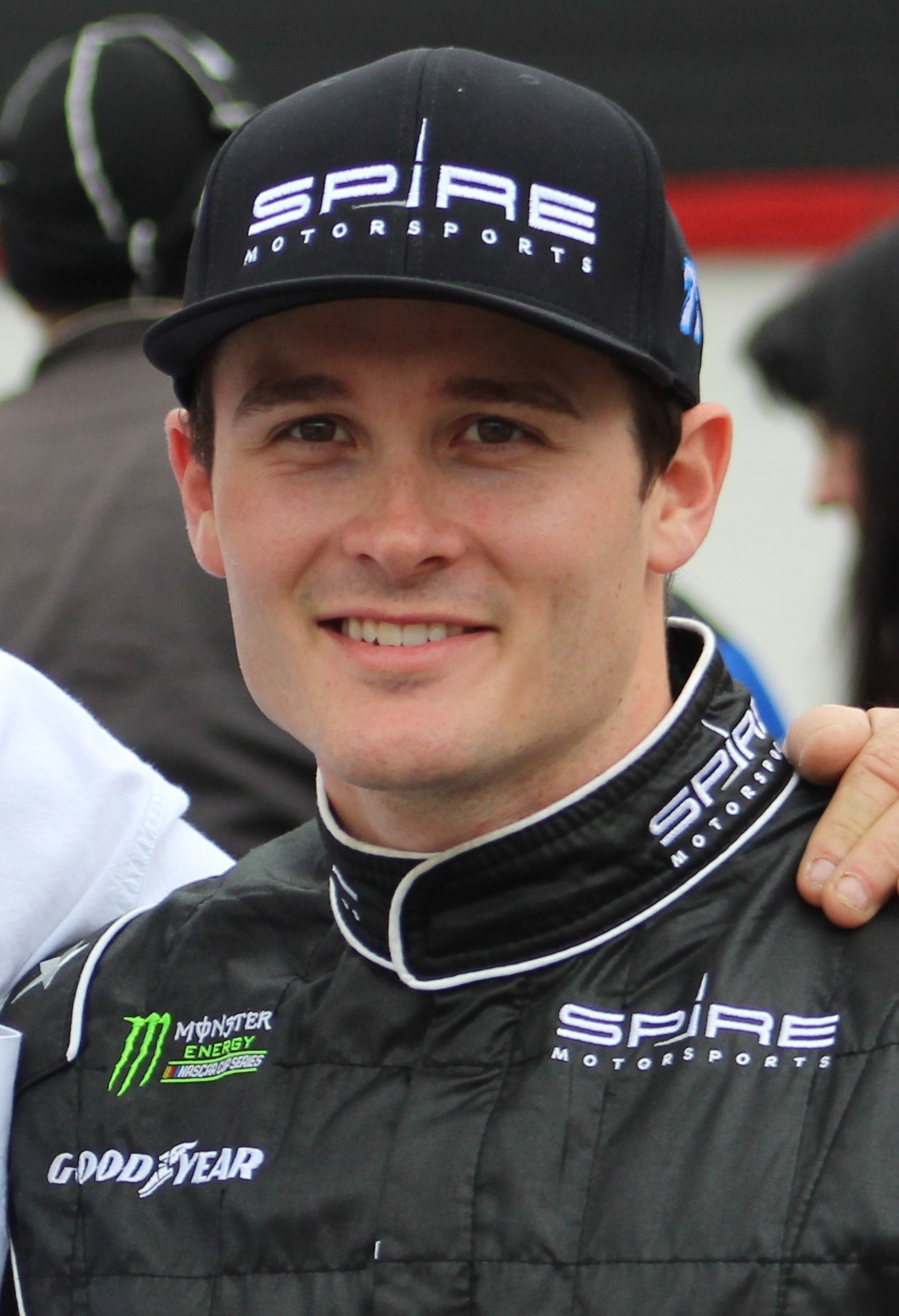
- Houff at Bristol Motor Speedway in 2019
- Born: Quin Walton Houff; September 15, 1997 (age 29); Weyers Cave, Virginia, U.S.

NASCAR Cup Series career
- 89 races run over 3 years
- 2021 position: 31st
- Best finish: 31st (2021)
- First race: 2019 TicketGuardian 500 (Phoenix)
- Last race: 2021 NASCAR Cup Series Championship Race (Phoenix)
Wins	Top tens	Poles
0	0	0

NASCAR O'Reilly Auto Parts Series career
- 10 races run over 2 years
- 2018 position: 49th
- Best finish: 49th (2018)
- First race: 2017 Fitzgerald Glider Kits 300 (Bristol)
- Last race: 2018 Ford EcoBoost 300 (Homestead)
Wins	Top tens	Poles
0	0	0
- Statistics up to date as of December 25, 2021.

Quin Walton Houff (born September 15, 1997) is an American former professional stock car racing driver. He has previously competed in the NASCAR Cup Series, the NASCAR Xfinity Series, and the ARCA Racing Series.

== Racing career ==
=== Early years ===
Houff started to race when he was eight, driving go-karts. A year later, he upgraded to Mini-Cup cars and by age thirteen, he was racing Limited Late Model cars at local tracks. During his formative years, Houff often competed at legendary short track South Boston Speedway.

=== Late models ===
Houff ran the entire 2015 CARS Super Late Model Series schedule at the age of seventeen. He won one race, in Hudson, North Carolina, recorded four more top fives and finished fourth in points. On the strength of that season, Houff was named to the 2016 Kulwicki Driver Development program. He won the 2016 CARS season opener, but ran only the first seven races, a move he made after consulting with a strategy team. He also ran the 2016 All American 400 for David Gilliland. Houff returned to the series on a limited basis in 2017. After not racing since the 2021 Cup Series finale at Phoenix, Houff attempted to run South Boston Speedway's Crown Jewel race and the first race of the Virginia Triple Crown, the Thunder Road Harley-Davidson 200.

=== ARCA Racing Series ===
Houff teamed up with Mason Mitchell and his team to run the opening race of the 2017 ARCA Racing Series after a test at Daytona International Speedway. After leading laps and earning an award for leading at halfway, he was caught up in a wreck.

On January 8, 2018, Houff and Mason Mitchell Motorsports announced that they would run at least four races together in 2018, at Daytona, Pocono Raceway, Michigan International Speedway and Charlotte Motor Speedway. He would work together with Mark Setzer, his crew chief from his Xfinity Series races.

=== Xfinity Series ===
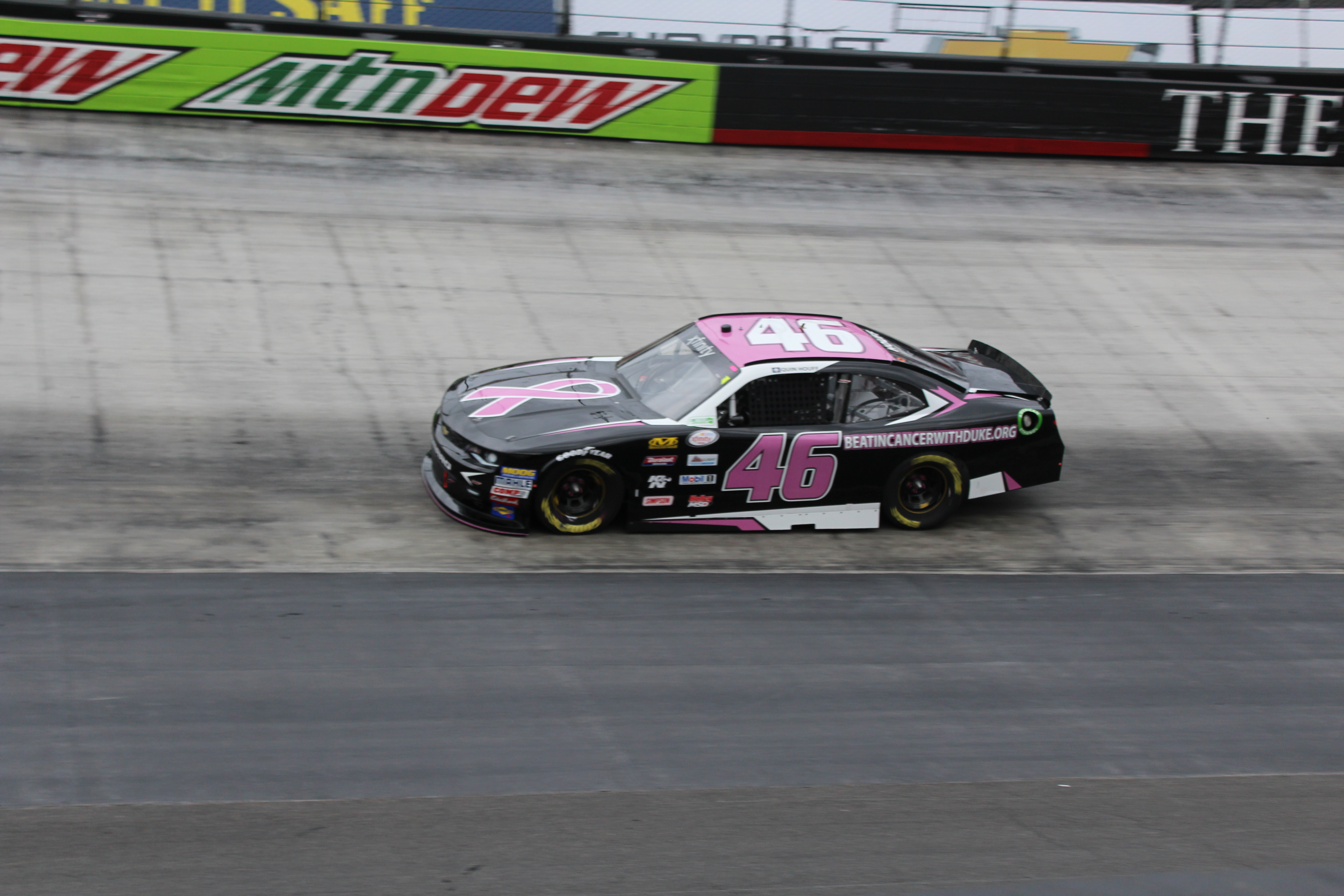
Houff's No. 46 at Bristol Motor Speedway in 2017

On March 21, 2017, it was announced that Houff would drive two NASCAR Xfinity Series races for Precision Performance Motorsports, at Bristol Motor Speedway and Richmond International Raceway. He tested for the races at Motor Mile Speedway. At Bristol, Houff hovered around the top ten most of the day after a strong qualifying run but damage due to an incident with Ross Chastain dropped him to fifteenth. After the race at Richmond, Houff signed on for two more races with the team, at Iowa Speedway and Kentucky Speedway. He took advantage of good pit strategy at Iowa to score a career-best twelfth but spun during his qualifying lap at Kentucky and failed to qualify. He made starts at Kentucky and Kansas, finishing in the mid-twenties. He failed to qualify for his final scheduled start of the year, at Homestead.

Houff was left without a ride as PPM shuttered its team at the end of the 2017 season.

On September 7, 2018, it was announced that Houff would make his 2018 Xfinity debut with JD Motorsports' No. 4 entry at Richmond. After finishing 31st in a one-off for the team, a deal came together on October 18, 2018 for Houff to run the final four races of the Xfinity Series season in the organization's No. 15 entry. The deal was made quickly, with Houff finalizing the deal and traveling to Kansas Speedway for the first race of the agreement on the same day.

=== Cup Series ===
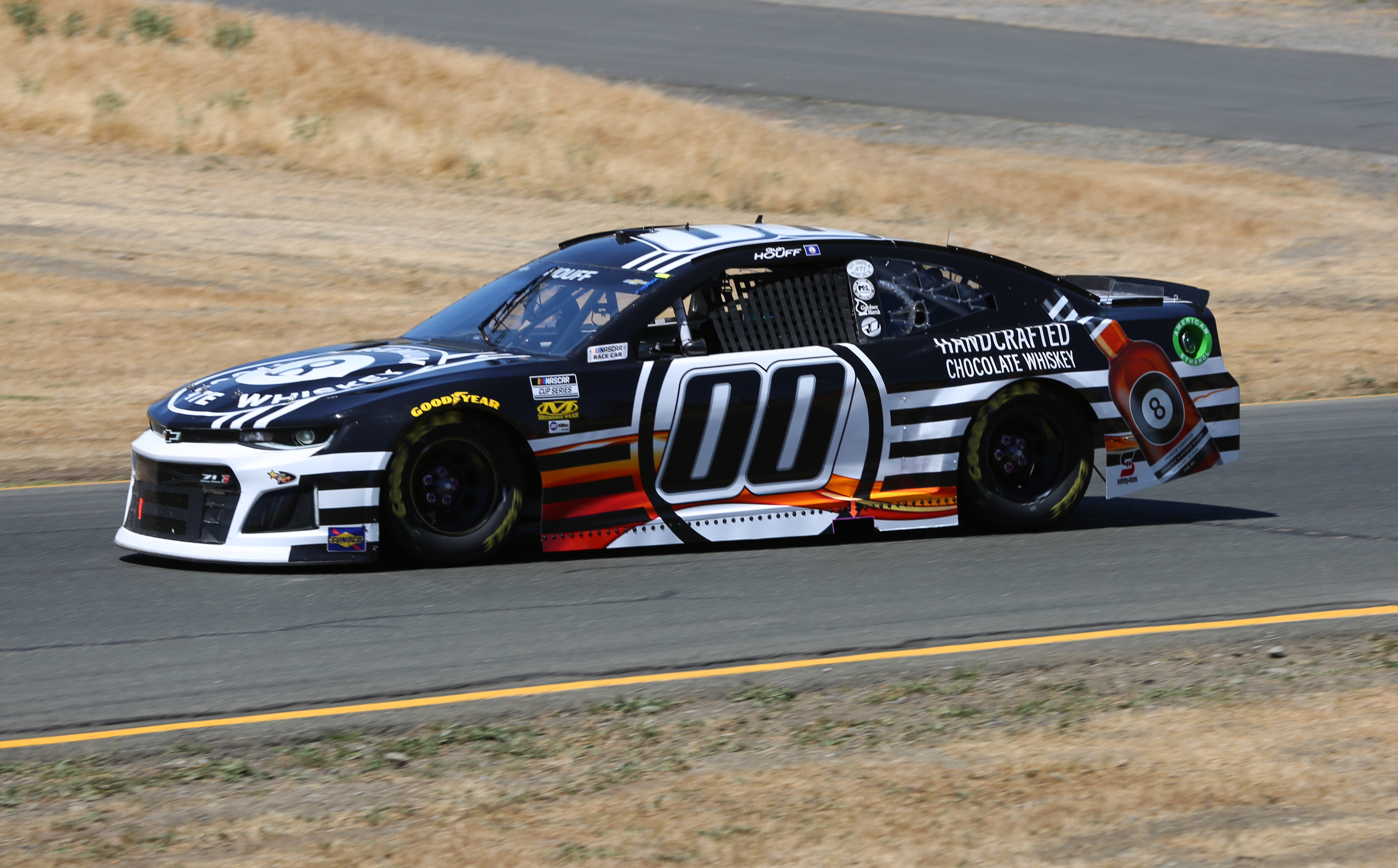
Houff's No. 00 at Sonoma Raceway in 2021

On January 22, 2019, Spire Motorsports announced Houff would drive the team's No. 77 on a part-time Monster Energy NASCAR Cup Series schedule starting at ISM Raceway. Early estimates pegged the number of races at approximately half of the 36-race schedule.

On November 27, 2019, StarCom Racing announced that Houff would drive the team's No. 00 on a full-time basis during the 2020 and 2021 seasons.

At the 2020 O'Reilly Auto Parts 500 at Texas, Houff made a last-minute decision to enter pit-road with 29 laps to go, clipping the cars of Christopher Bell and Matt DiBenedetto in the process before crashing into the outside retaining wall. He was later on criticized by DiBenedetto and Brad Keselowski, who proposed that NASCAR should add a relegation structure that would demote developmental drivers to the lower divisions should they commit a mistake similar to Houff's. Later that season, in the 2020 Yellawood 500 at Talladega Superspeedway, he finished a career high thirteenth place after avoiding multiple accidents on the ending laps.

In 2021, Talladega would again be Houff's strong suit, as he scored a season-high nineteenth place finish in the 2021 YellaWood 500. StarCom Racing would shut down at the end of 2021, leaving Houff without a ride.

== Personal life ==
Houff works with Duke University School of Medicine's cancer programs, as his mother was treated for cancer there. His grandmother also had cancer.

== Motorsports career results ==
=== NASCAR ===
(key) (Bold – Pole position awarded by qualifying time. Italics – Pole position earned by points standings or practice time. * – Most laps led.)

==== Cup Series ====
NASCAR Cup Series results
Year	Team	No.	Make	1	2	3	4	5	6	7	8	9	10	11	12	13	14	15	16	17	18	19	20	21	22	23	24	25	26	27	28	29	30	31	32	33	34	35	36	NCSC	Pts	Ref
2019	Spire Motorsports	77	Chevy	DAY	ATL	LVS	PHO; 30	CAL	MAR	TEX	BRI; 32	RCH; 34	TAL	DOV; 36	KAN; 34	CLT; 28	POC; 29	MCH; 32	SON	CHI; 38		KEN; 34	NHA; 31	POC; 31	GLN												TEX; 33	PHO	HOM	33rd	77	
2019	Premium Motorsports	15	Chevy																		DAY; 37																			33rd	77	
2019	Premium Motorsports	27	Chevy																							MCH; 31	BRI; 30	DAR	IND	LVS	RCH; 35	ROV	DOV	TAL	KAN	MAR				33rd	77	
2020	StarCom Racing	00	Chevy	DAY; 39	LVS; 32	CAL; 35	PHO; 34	DAR; 36	DAR; 26	CLT; 35	CLT; 32	BRI; 27	ATL; 32	MAR; 34	HOM; 33	TAL; 27	POC; 40	POC; 31	IND; 23	KEN; 35	TEX; 34	KAN; 24	NHA; 32	MCH; 27	MCH; 32	DAY; 33	DOV; 33	DOV; 34	DAY; 23	DAR; 31	RCH; 32	BRI; 29	LVS; 34	TAL; 13	ROV; 28	KAN; 33	TEX; 33	MAR; 33	PHO; 39	33rd	214	
2021	StarCom Racing	00	Chevy	DAY; 29	DAY; 40	HOM; 35	LVS; 33	PHO; 32	ATL; 33	BRD; 25	MAR; 24	RCH; 34	TAL; 37	KAN; 37	DAR; 30	DOV; 29	COA; 34	CLT; 32	SON; 36	NSH; 38	POC; 31	POC; 33	ROA; 34	ATL; 35	NHA; 35	GLN; 32	IND; 22	MCH; 30	DAY; 38	DAR; 30	RCH; 35	BRI; 34	LVS; 34	TAL; 19	ROV; 30	TEX; 31	KAN; 35	MAR; 34	PHO; 37	31st	176	

===== Daytona 500 =====
Year	Team	Manufacturer	Start	Finish
2020	StarCom Racing	Chevrolet	35	39
2021	StarCom Racing	Chevrolet	33	29

==== Xfinity Series ====
NASCAR Xfinity Series results
Year	Team	No.	Make	1	2	3	4	5	6	7	8	9	10	11	12	13	14	15	16	17	18	19	20	21	22	23	24	25	26	27	28	29	30	31	32	33	NXSC	Pts	Ref
2017	Precision Performance Motorsports	46	Chevy	DAY	ATL	LVS	PHO	CAL	TEX	BRI; 15	RCH; 27	TAL	CLT	DOV	POC	MCH	IOW; 12	DAY	KEN; DNQ	NHA	IND	IOW	GLN	MOH	BRI	ROA	DAR	RCH	CHI	KEN; 27	DOV	CLT	KAN; 22	TEX	PHO	HOM; DNQ	41st	82	
2018	JD Motorsports	4	Chevy	DAY	ATL	LVS	PHO	CAL	TEX	BRI	RCH	TAL	DOV	CLT	POC	MCH	IOW	CHI	DAY	KEN	NHA	IOW	GLN	MOH	BRI	ROA	DAR	IND	LVS	RCH; 31	CLT	DOV					49th	56	
2018	JD Motorsports	15	Chevy																														KAN; 14	TEX; 26	PHO; 29	HOM; 29	49th	56	

==== K&N Pro Series East ====
NASCAR K&N Pro Series East results
Year	Team	No.	Make	1	2	3	4	5	6	7	8	9	10	11	12	13	14	15	16	NKNPSEC	Pts	Ref
2014	Ken Schrader Racing	52	Chevy	NSM	DAY	BRI	GRE	RCH	IOW	BGS	FIF	LGY	NHA	COL	IOW	GLN	VIR	GRE; 21	DOV	63rd	23	

^{*} Season still in progress
^{1} Ineligible for series points

=== ARCA Racing Series ===
(key) (Bold – Pole position awarded by qualifying time. Italics – Pole position earned by points standings or practice time. * – Most laps led.)

ARCA Racing Series results
Year	Team	No.	Make	1	2	3	4	5	6	7	8	9	10	11	12	13	14	15	16	17	18	19	20	ARSC	Pts	Ref
2017	Mason Mitchell Motorsports	98	Chevy	DAY; 28	NSH	SLM	TAL	TOL	ELK	POC	MCH	MAD	IOW	IRP	POC	WIN	ISF	ROA	DSF	SLM	CHI	KEN	KAN	115th	95	
2018	Mason Mitchell Motorsports	98	Chevy	DAY; 32	NSH	SLM	TAL	TOL	CLT; 6	POC	MCH; 8	MAD	GTW	CHI	IOW	ELK								34th	585	
2018	Mason Mitchell Motorsports	78	Chevy														POC; 21	ISF	BLN	DSF	SLM	IRP	KAN	34th	585	

=== CARS Super Late Model Tour ===
(key) (Bold – Pole position awarded by qualifying time. Italics – Pole position earned by points standings or practice time. * – Most laps led. ** – All laps led.)

CARS Super Late Model Tour results
Year	Team	No.	Make	1	2	3	4	5	6	7	8	9	10	11	12	13	CSLMTC	Pts	Ref
2015	LFR Chassis	17	Chevy	SNM; 10	HCY; 24	ROU; 13	SNM; 5	TCM; 1	MMS; 15	ROU; 4	CNC; 5	MYB; 5	HCY; 10				4th	251	
2016	LFR Chassis	17	Chevy	SNM; 1*	ROU; 8	HCY; 5	TCM; 8	GPS; 7	ROU; 21	CNC; 3	MYB	HCY	SNM				6th	182	
2017	Anthony Campi Racing	81	Toyota	CNC	DOM; 4	DOM; 4	HCY	HCY	BRI	AND	ROU	TCM	ROU	HCY	CNC	SBO	24th	58	
