= 2021 Quaker State 400 =

NASCAR Cup Series race

Race details
- Race 21 of 36 in the 2021 NASCAR Cup Series
- Date: July 11, 2021
- Location: Atlanta Motor Speedway in Hampton, Georgia
- Course: Permanent racing facility
- Course length: 1.54 miles (2.48 km)
- Distance: 260 laps, 400.4 mi (644.244 km)
- Average speed: 147.207 miles per hour (236.907 km/h)

Pole position
| Driver | Chase Elliott | Hendrick Motorsports |
- Grid positions set by competition-based formula

Most laps led
| Driver | Kurt Busch | Chip Ganassi Racing |
- Laps: 144

Winner
| No. 1 | Kurt Busch | Chip Ganassi Racing |

Television in the United States
- Network: NBCSN
- Announcers: Rick Allen, Jeff Burton, Steve Letarte and Dale Earnhardt Jr.

Radio in the United States
- Radio: PRN
- Booth announcers: Doug Rice and Mark Garrow
- Turn announcers: Rob Albright (1 & 2) and Brad Gillie (3 & 4)

The 2021 Quaker State 400 was a NASCAR Cup Series race held on July 11, 2021, at Atlanta Motor Speedway in Hampton, Georgia. Contested over 260 laps on the 1.54-mile-long (2.48 km) asphalt quad-oval intermediate speedway, it was the 21st race of the 2021 NASCAR Cup Series season. Kurt Busch, driving the No. 1 car for Chip Ganassi Racing, held off his younger brother Kyle to secure what would ultimately be CGR's final win in NASCAR. This was also the last race held at the track before it was re-configured into a superspeedway in 2022.

== Report ==
=== Background ===
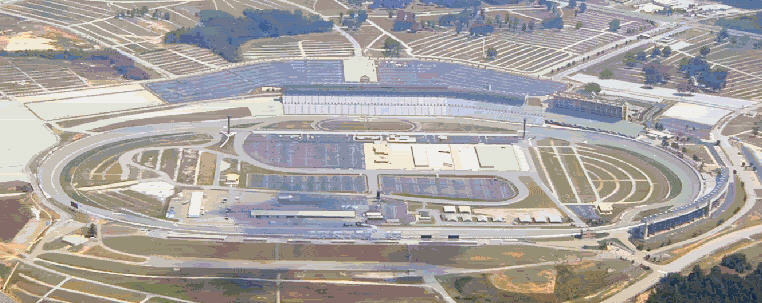
Atlanta Motor Speedway, the track where the race was held.

Atlanta Motor Speedway (formerly Atlanta International Raceway) is a track in Hampton, Georgia, 20 miles (32 km) south of Atlanta. It is a 1.54-mile (2.48 km) quad-oval track with a seating capacity of 111,000. It opened in 1960 as a 1.5-mile (2.4 km) standard oval. In 1994, 46 condominiums were built over the northeastern side of the track. In 1997, to standardize the track with Speedway Motorsports' other two 1.5-mile (2.4 km) ovals, the entire track was almost completely rebuilt. The frontstretch and backstretch were swapped, and the configuration of the track was changed from oval to quad-oval. The project made the track one of the fastest on the NASCAR circuit.

==== Entry list ====
- (R) denotes rookie driver.
- (i) denotes driver who are ineligible for series driver points.

| No. | Driver | Team | Manufacturer |
|---|---|---|---|
| 00 | Quin Houff | StarCom Racing | Chevrolet |
| 1 | Kurt Busch | Chip Ganassi Racing | Chevrolet |
| 2 | Brad Keselowski | Team Penske | Ford |
| 3 | Austin Dillon | Richard Childress Racing | Chevrolet |
| 4 | Kevin Harvick | Stewart-Haas Racing | Ford |
| 5 | Kyle Larson | Hendrick Motorsports | Chevrolet |
| 6 | Ryan Newman | Roush Fenway Racing | Ford |
| 7 | Corey LaJoie | Spire Motorsports | Chevrolet |
| 8 | Tyler Reddick | Richard Childress Racing | Chevrolet |
| 9 | Chase Elliott | Hendrick Motorsports | Chevrolet |
| 10 | Aric Almirola | Stewart-Haas Racing | Ford |
| 11 | Denny Hamlin | Joe Gibbs Racing | Toyota |
| 12 | Ryan Blaney | Team Penske | Ford |
| 14 | Chase Briscoe (R) | Stewart-Haas Racing | Ford |
| 15 | Bayley Currey (i) | Rick Ware Racing | Chevrolet |
| 17 | Chris Buescher | Roush Fenway Racing | Ford |
| 18 | Kyle Busch | Joe Gibbs Racing | Toyota |
| 19 | Martin Truex Jr. | Joe Gibbs Racing | Toyota |
| 20 | Christopher Bell | Joe Gibbs Racing | Toyota |
| 21 | Matt DiBenedetto | Wood Brothers Racing | Ford |
| 22 | Joey Logano | Team Penske | Ford |
| 23 | Bubba Wallace | 23XI Racing | Toyota |
| 24 | William Byron | Hendrick Motorsports | Chevrolet |
| 34 | Michael McDowell | Front Row Motorsports | Ford |
| 37 | Ryan Preece | JTG Daugherty Racing | Chevrolet |
| 38 | Anthony Alfredo (R) | Front Row Motorsports | Ford |
| 41 | Cole Custer | Stewart-Haas Racing | Ford |
| 42 | Ross Chastain | Chip Ganassi Racing | Chevrolet |
| 43 | Erik Jones | Richard Petty Motorsports | Chevrolet |
| 47 | Ricky Stenhouse Jr. | JTG Daugherty Racing | Chevrolet |
| 48 | Alex Bowman | Hendrick Motorsports | Chevrolet |
| 51 | Cody Ware (i) | Petty Ware Racing | Chevrolet |
| 52 | Josh Bilicki | Rick Ware Racing | Ford |
| 53 | Garrett Smithley (i) | Rick Ware Racing | Chevrolet |
| 77 | Justin Haley (i) | Spire Motorsports | Chevrolet |
| 78 | B. J. McLeod (i) | Live Fast Motorsports | Ford |
| 99 | Daniel Suárez | Trackhouse Racing Team | Chevrolet |
Official entry list

== Qualifying ==
Chase Elliott was awarded the pole for the race as determined by competition-based formula.

=== Starting Lineup ===
| Pos | No. | Driver | Team | Manufacturer |
|---|---|---|---|---|
| 1 | 9 | Chase Elliott | Hendrick Motorsports | Chevrolet |
| 2 | 18 | Kyle Busch | Joe Gibbs Racing | Toyota |
| 3 | 11 | Denny Hamlin | Joe Gibbs Racing | Toyota |
| 4 | 20 | Christopher Bell | Joe Gibbs Racing | Toyota |
| 5 | 19 | Martin Truex Jr. | Joe Gibbs Racing | Toyota |
| 6 | 5 | Kyle Larson | Hendrick Motorsports | Chevrolet |
| 7 | 1 | Kurt Busch | Chip Ganassi Racing | Chevrolet |
| 8 | 8 | Tyler Reddick | Richard Childress Racing | Chevrolet |
| 9 | 42 | Ross Chastain | Chip Ganassi Racing | Chevrolet |
| 10 | 22 | Joey Logano | Team Penske | Ford |
| 11 | 14 | Chase Briscoe (R) | Stewart-Haas Racing | Ford |
| 12 | 21 | Matt DiBenedetto | Wood Brothers Racing | Ford |
| 13 | 3 | Austin Dillon | Richard Childress Racing | Chevrolet |
| 14 | 2 | Brad Keselowski | Team Penske | Ford |
| 15 | 12 | Ryan Blaney | Team Penske | Ford |
| 16 | 47 | Ricky Stenhouse Jr. | JTG Daugherty Racing | Chevrolet |
| 17 | 48 | Alex Bowman | Hendrick Motorsports | Chevrolet |
| 18 | 17 | Chris Buescher | Roush Fenway Racing | Ford |
| 19 | 24 | William Byron | Hendrick Motorsports | Chevrolet |
| 20 | 10 | Aric Almirola | Stewart-Haas Racing | Ford |
| 21 | 4 | Kevin Harvick | Stewart-Haas Racing | Ford |
| 22 | 43 | Erik Jones | Richard Petty Motorsports | Chevrolet |
| 23 | 41 | Cole Custer | Stewart-Haas Racing | Ford |
| 24 | 23 | Bubba Wallace | 23XI Racing | Toyota |
| 25 | 34 | Michael McDowell | Front Row Motorsports | Ford |
| 26 | 7 | Corey LaJoie | Spire Motorsports | Chevrolet |
| 27 | 99 | Daniel Suárez | Trackhouse Racing Team | Chevrolet |
| 28 | 77 | Justin Haley (i) | Spire Motorsports | Chevrolet |
| 29 | 6 | Ryan Newman | Roush Fenway Racing | Ford |
| 30 | 52 | Josh Bilicki | Rick Ware Racing | Ford |
| 31 | 51 | Cody Ware (i) | Petty Ware Racing | Chevrolet |
| 32 | 38 | Anthony Alfredo (R) | Front Row Motorsports | Ford |
| 33 | 15 | Bayley Currey (i) | Rick Ware Racing | Chevrolet |
| 34 | 37 | Ryan Preece | JTG Daugherty Racing | Chevrolet |
| 35 | 00 | Quin Houff | StarCom Racing | Chevrolet |
| 36 | 78 | B. J. McLeod (i) | Live Fast Motorsports | Ford |
| 37 | 53 | Garrett Smithley (i) | Rick Ware Racing | Chevrolet |
Official starting lineup

== Race ==
=== Stage Results ===
Stage One Laps: 80

| Pos | No | Driver | Team | Manufacturer | Points |
|---|---|---|---|---|---|
| 1 | 18 | Kyle Busch | Joe Gibbs Racing | Toyota | 10 |
| 2 | 1 | Kurt Busch | Chip Ganassi Racing | Chevrolet | 9 |
| 3 | 11 | Denny Hamlin | Joe Gibbs Racing | Toyota | 8 |
| 4 | 48 | Alex Bowman | Hendrick Motorsports | Chevrolet | 7 |
| 5 | 8 | Tyler Reddick | Richard Childress Racing | Chevrolet | 6 |
| 6 | 5 | Kyle Larson | Hendrick Motorsports | Chevrolet | 5 |
| 7 | 22 | Joey Logano | Team Penske | Ford | 4 |
| 8 | 24 | William Byron | Hendrick Motorsports | Chevrolet | 3 |
| 9 | 19 | Martin Truex Jr. | Joe Gibbs Racing | Toyota | 2 |
| 10 | 4 | Kevin Harvick | Stewart-Haas Racing | Ford | 1 |
Official stage one results

Stage Two Laps: 80

| Pos | No | Driver | Team | Manufacturer | Points |
|---|---|---|---|---|---|
| 1 | 1 | Kurt Busch | Chip Ganassi Racing | Chevrolet | 10 |
| 2 | 18 | Kyle Busch | Joe Gibbs Racing | Toyota | 9 |
| 3 | 48 | Alex Bowman | Hendrick Motorsports | Chevrolet | 8 |
| 4 | 5 | Kyle Larson | Hendrick Motorsports | Chevrolet | 7 |
| 5 | 11 | Denny Hamlin | Joe Gibbs Racing | Toyota | 6 |
| 6 | 8 | Tyler Reddick | Richard Childress Racing | Chevrolet | 5 |
| 7 | 12 | Ryan Blaney | Team Penske | Ford | 4 |
| 8 | 2 | Brad Keselowski | Team Penske | Ford | 3 |
| 9 | 3 | Austin Dillon | Richard Childress Racing | Chevrolet | 2 |
| 10 | 19 | Martin Truex Jr. | Joe Gibbs Racing | Toyota | 1 |
Official stage two results

=== Final Stage Results ===
Stage Three Laps: 100

| Pos | Grid | No | Driver | Team | Manufacturer | Laps | Points |
|---|---|---|---|---|---|---|---|
| 1 | 8 | 1 | Kurt Busch | Chip Ganassi Racing | Chevrolet | 260 | 59 |
| 2 | 2 | 18 | Kyle Busch | Joe Gibbs Racing | Toyota | 260 | 54 |
| 3 | 5 | 19 | Martin Truex Jr. | Joe Gibbs Racing | Toyota | 260 | 37 |
| 4 | 17 | 48 | Alex Bowman | Hendrick Motorsports | Chevrolet | 260 | 48 |
| 5 | 15 | 12 | Ryan Blaney | Team Penske | Ford | 260 | 36 |
| 6 | 7 | 8 | Tyler Reddick | Richard Childress Racing | Chevrolet | 260 | 42 |
| 7 | 1 | 9 | Chase Elliott | Hendrick Motorsports | Chevrolet | 260 | 30 |
| 8 | 4 | 20 | Christopher Bell | Joe Gibbs Racing | Toyota | 260 | 29 |
| 9 | 12 | 21 | Matt DiBenedetto | Wood Brothers Racing | Ford | 260 | 28 |
| 10 | 14 | 2 | Brad Keselowski | Team Penske | Ford | 260 | 30 |
| 11 | 21 | 4 | Kevin Harvick | Stewart-Haas Racing | Ford | 260 | 27 |
| 12 | 13 | 3 | Austin Dillon | Richard Childress Racing | Chevrolet | 260 | 27 |
| 13 | 3 | 11 | Denny Hamlin | Joe Gibbs Racing | Toyota | 260 | 38 |
| 14 | 24 | 23 | Bubba Wallace | 23XI Racing | Toyota | 260 | 23 |
| 15 | 11 | 14 | Chase Briscoe (R) | Stewart-Haas Racing | Ford | 260 | 22 |
| 16 | 18 | 17 | Chris Buescher | Roush Fenway Racing | Ford | 260 | 21 |
| 17 | 23 | 41 | Cole Custer | Stewart-Haas Racing | Ford | 260 | 20 |
| 18 | 6 | 5 | Kyle Larson | Hendrick Motorsports | Chevrolet | 260 | 31 |
| 19 | 10 | 22 | Joey Logano | Team Penske | Ford | 259 | 22 |
| 20 | 19 | 24 | William Byron | Hendrick Motorsports | Chevrolet | 259 | 20 |
| 21 | 9 | 42 | Ross Chastain | Chip Ganassi Racing | Chevrolet | 259 | 16 |
| 22 | 26 | 7 | Corey LaJoie | Spire Motorsports | Chevrolet | 258 | 15 |
| 23 | 20 | 10 | Aric Almirola | Stewart-Haas Racing | Ford | 258 | 14 |
| 24 | 22 | 43 | Erik Jones | Richard Petty Motorsports | Chevrolet | 258 | 13 |
| 25 | 34 | 37 | Ryan Preece | JTG Daugherty Racing | Chevrolet | 258 | 12 |
| 26 | 32 | 38 | Anthony Alfredo (R) | Front Row Motorsports | Ford | 257 | 11 |
| 27 | 25 | 34 | Michael McDowell | Front Row Motorsports | Ford | 256 | 10 |
| 28 | 29 | 6 | Ryan Newman | Roush Fenway Racing | Ford | 256 | 9 |
| 29 | 28 | 77 | Justin Haley (i) | Spire Motorsports | Chevrolet | 255 | 0 |
| 30 | 36 | 78 | B.J. McLeod (i) | Live Fast Motorsports | Ford | 254 | 0 |
| 31 | 37 | 53 | Garrett Smithley (i) | Rick Ware Racing | Chevrolet | 253 | 0 |
| 32 | 33 | 15 | Bayley Currey (i) | Rick Ware Racing | Chevrolet | 253 | 0 |
| 33 | 31 | 51 | Cody Ware (i) | Petty Ware Racing | Chevrolet | 253 | 0 |
| 34 | 30 | 52 | Josh Bilicki | Rick Ware Racing | Ford | 248 | 3 |
| 35 | 35 | 00 | Quin Houff | StarCom Racing | Chevrolet | 248 | 2 |
| 36 | 27 | 99 | Daniel Suárez | Trackhouse Racing Team | Chevrolet | 243 | 1 |
| 37 | 16 | 47 | Ricky Stenhouse Jr. | JTG Daugherty Racing | Chevrolet | 178 | 1 |
Official race results

=== Race statistics ===
- Lead changes: 10 among 7 different drivers
- Cautions/Laps: 4 for 21
- Red flags: 1 for 19 minutes and 4 seconds
- Time of race: 2 hours, 50 minutes and 8 seconds
- Average speed: 147.207 miles per hour (236.907 km/h)

== Media ==
=== Television ===
NBC Sports covered the race on the television side. Rick Allen, Jeff Burton, Steve Letarte and 2004 Atlanta winner Dale Earnhardt Jr. called the race from the broadcast booth. Dave Burns, Marty Snider and Dillon Welch handled the pit road duties from pit lane. Rutledge Wood handled the features from the track.

NBCSN
| Booth announcers | Pit reporters | Features reporter |
|---|---|---|
| Lap-by-lap: Rick Allen; Color-commentator: Jeff Burton; Color-commentator: Steve Letarte; Color-commentator: Dale Earnhardt Jr. | Dave Burns; Marty Snider; Dillon Welch | Rutledge Wood |

=== Radio ===
The race was broadcast on radio by the Performance Racing Network and simulcast on Sirius XM NASCAR Radio. Doug Rice and Mark Garrow called the race from the booth when the field raced down the front stretch. Rob Albright called the race from atop a billboard outside of turn 2 when the field raced through turns 1 and 2 & Brad Gillie called the race from a billboard outside of turn 3 when the field raced through turns 3 and 4. On pit road, PRN was manned by Alan Cavanna, Brett McMillan and Doug Turnbull.

PRN
| Booth announcers | Turn announcers | Pit reporters |
|---|---|---|
| Lead announcer: Doug Rice; Announcer: Mark Garrow | Turns 1 & 2: Rob Albright; Turns 3 & 4: Brad Gillie | Doug Turnbull; Brett McMillan; Alan Cavanna |

== Standings after the race ==
Drivers' Championship standings

| | Pos | Driver | Points |
|---|---|---|---|
| | 1 | Denny Hamlin | 836 |
| | 2 | Kyle Larson | 826 (–10) |
| 1 | 3 | Kyle Busch | 739 (–97) |
| 1 | 4 | William Byron | 733 (–103) |
| 1 | 5 | Chase Elliott | 704 (–132) |
| 1 | 6 | Joey Logano | 700 (–136) |
| | 7 | Martin Truex Jr. | 671 (–165) |
| | 8 | Ryan Blaney | 639 (–197) |
| | 9 | Kevin Harvick | 626 (–210) |
| | 10 | Brad Keselowski | 623 (–213) |
| | 11 | Alex Bowman | 609 (–227) |
| | 12 | Austin Dillon | 571 (–265) |
| | 13 | Tyler Reddick | 563 (–273) |
| | 14 | Kurt Busch | 530 (–306) |
| | 15 | Christopher Bell | 492 (–344) |
| | 16 | Chris Buescher | 467 (–369) |
Official driver's standings

Manufacturers' Championship standings

| | Pos | Manufacturer | Points |
|---|---|---|---|
| | 1 | Chevrolet | 782 |
| 1 | 2 | Toyota | 720 (–62) |
| 1 | 3 | Ford | 718 (–64) |

- Note: Only the first 16 positions are included for the driver standings.
- . – Driver has clinched a position in the NASCAR Cup Series playoffs.

| Previous race: 2021 Jockey Made in America 250 | NASCAR Cup Series; 2021 season | Next race: 2021 Foxwoods Resort Casino 301 |
