= 2020 O'Reilly Auto Parts 500 =

NASCAR Cup Series race

Race details
- Race 18 of 36 in the 2020 NASCAR Cup Series
- 2020 O'Reilly Auto Parts 500 program cover
- Date: July 19, 2020
- Location: Texas Motor Speedway in Fort Worth, Texas
- Course: Permanent racing facility
- Course length: 1.5 miles (2.4 km)
- Distance: 334 laps, 501 mi (801.6 km)
- Average speed: 137.292 miles per hour (220.950 km/h)

Pole position
Driver	Aric Almirola	Stewart-Haas Racing
- Grid positions set by ballot

Most laps led
Driver	Ryan Blaney	Team Penske
- Laps: 150

Winner
No. 3	Austin Dillon	Richard Childress Racing

Television in the United States
- Network: NBCSN
- Announcers: Rick Allen, Jeff Burton, Steve Letarte and Dale Earnhardt Jr.
- Nielsen ratings: 2.731 million

Radio in the United States
- Radio: PRN
- Booth announcers: Doug Rice and Mark Garrow
- Turn announcers: Rob Albright (1 & 2) and Pat Patterson (3 & 4)

The 2020 O'Reilly Auto Parts 500 was a NASCAR Cup Series race that was originally scheduled to be held on March 29, 2020, and was rescheduled to July 19, 2020, at Texas Motor Speedway in Fort Worth, Texas. Contested over 334 laps on the 1.5-mile (2.4 km) intermediate quad-oval, it is the 18th race of the 2020 NASCAR Cup Series season. Austin Dillon won, bringing Richard Childress Racing their first 1-2 finish since the 2011 Good Sam Club 500.

== Report ==
=== Background ===
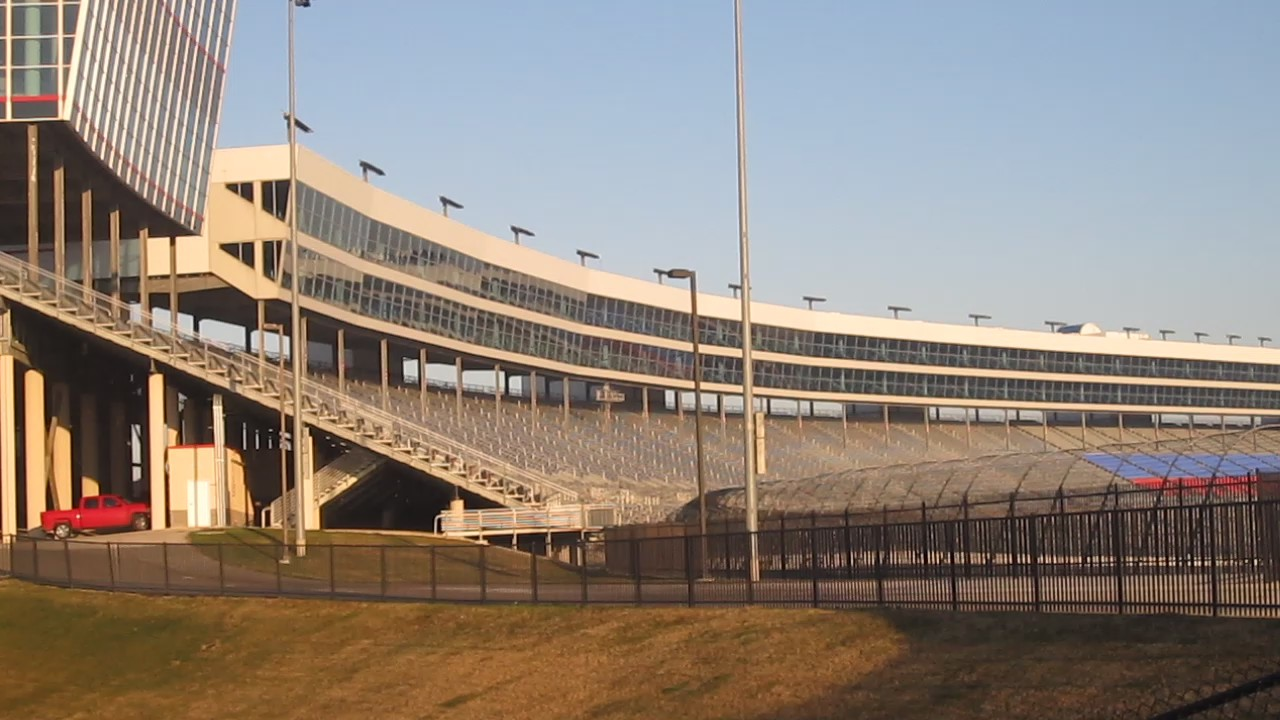
Texas Motor Speedway, the track where the race was held.

Texas Motor Speedway is a speedway located in the northernmost portion of the U.S. city of Fort Worth, Texas – the portion located in Denton County, Texas. The track measures 1.5 miles (2.4 km) around and is banked 24 degrees in the turns, and is of the oval design, where the front straightaway juts outward slightly. The track layout is similar to Atlanta Motor Speedway and Charlotte Motor Speedway (formerly Lowe's Motor Speedway). The track is owned by Speedway Motorsports, Inc., the same company that owns Atlanta and Charlotte Motor Speedways, as well as the short-track Bristol Motor Speedway.

==== Entry list ====
- (R) denotes rookie driver.
- (i) denotes driver who are ineligible for series driver points.

No.	Driver	Team	Manufacturer
00	Quin Houff (R)	StarCom Racing	Chevrolet
1	Kurt Busch	Chip Ganassi Racing	Chevrolet
2	Brad Keselowski	Team Penske	Ford
3	Austin Dillon	Richard Childress Racing	Chevrolet
4	Kevin Harvick	Stewart-Haas Racing	Ford
6	Ryan Newman	Roush Fenway Racing	Ford
7	Reed Sorenson	Tommy Baldwin Racing	Chevrolet
8	Tyler Reddick (R)	Richard Childress Racing	Chevrolet
9	Chase Elliott	Hendrick Motorsports	Chevrolet
10	Aric Almirola	Stewart-Haas Racing	Ford
11	Denny Hamlin	Joe Gibbs Racing	Toyota
12	Ryan Blaney	Team Penske	Ford
13	Ty Dillon	Germain Racing	Chevrolet
14	Clint Bowyer	Stewart-Haas Racing	Ford
15	Brennan Poole (R)	Premium Motorsports	Chevrolet
17	Chris Buescher	Roush Fenway Racing	Ford
18	Kyle Busch	Joe Gibbs Racing	Toyota
19	Martin Truex Jr.	Joe Gibbs Racing	Toyota
20	Erik Jones	Joe Gibbs Racing	Toyota
21	Matt DiBenedetto	Wood Brothers Racing	Ford
22	Joey Logano	Team Penske	Ford
24	William Byron	Hendrick Motorsports	Chevrolet
27	Gray Gaulding (i)	Rick Ware Racing	Ford
32	Corey LaJoie	Go Fas Racing	Ford
34	Michael McDowell	Front Row Motorsports	Ford
37	Ryan Preece	JTG Daugherty Racing	Chevrolet
38	John Hunter Nemechek (R)	Front Row Motorsports	Ford
41	Cole Custer (R)	Stewart-Haas Racing	Ford
42	Matt Kenseth	Chip Ganassi Racing	Chevrolet
43	Bubba Wallace	Richard Petty Motorsports	Chevrolet
47	Ricky Stenhouse Jr.	JTG Daugherty Racing	Chevrolet
48	Jimmie Johnson	Hendrick Motorsports	Chevrolet
51	Joey Gase (i)	Petty Ware Racing	Ford
53	Josh Bilicki (i)	Rick Ware Racing	Chevrolet
66	Timmy Hill (i)	MBM Motorsports	Toyota
77	J. J. Yeley (i)	Spire Motorsports	Chevrolet
78	B. J. McLeod (i)	B. J. McLeod Motorsports	Chevrolet
88	Alex Bowman	Hendrick Motorsports	Chevrolet
90	TBA	Team Keller Racing	Chevrolet
95	Christopher Bell (R)	Leavine Family Racing	Toyota
96	Daniel Suárez	Gaunt Brothers Racing	Toyota
Official entry list

== Qualifying ==
Aric Almirola was awarded the pole for the race as determined by a random draw.

=== Starting Lineup ===
Pos	No.	Driver	Team	Manufacturer
1	10	Aric Almirola	Stewart-Haas Racing	Ford
2	12	Ryan Blaney	Team Penske	Ford
3	1	Kurt Busch	Chip Ganassi Racing	Chevrolet
4	18	Kyle Busch	Joe Gibbs Racing	Toyota
5	4	Kevin Harvick	Stewart-Haas Racing	Ford
6	2	Brad Keselowski	Team Penske	Ford
7	11	Denny Hamlin	Joe Gibbs Racing	Toyota
8	9	Chase Elliott	Hendrick Motorsports	Chevrolet
9	22	Joey Logano	Team Penske	Ford
10	19	Martin Truex Jr.	Joe Gibbs Racing	Toyota
11	21	Matt DiBenedetto	Wood Brothers Racing	Ford
12	88	Alex Bowman	Hendrick Motorsports	Chevrolet
13	47	Ricky Stenhouse Jr.	JTG Daugherty Racing	Chevrolet
14	43	Bubba Wallace	Richard Petty Motorsports	Chevrolet
15	6	Ryan Newman	Roush Fenway Racing	Ford
16	17	Chris Buescher	Roush Fenway Racing	Ford
17	14	Clint Bowyer	Stewart-Haas Racing	Ford
18	24	William Byron	Hendrick Motorsports	Chevrolet
19	41	Cole Custer (R)	Stewart-Haas Racing	Ford
20	48	Jimmie Johnson	Hendrick Motorsports	Chevrolet
21	3	Austin Dillon	Richard Childress Racing	Chevrolet
22	42	Matt Kenseth	Chip Ganassi Racing	Chevrolet
23	20	Erik Jones	Joe Gibbs Racing	Toyota
24	8	Tyler Reddick (R)	Richard Childress Racing	Chevrolet
25	37	Ryan Preece	JTG Daugherty Racing	Chevrolet
26	00	Quin Houff (R)	StarCom Racing	Chevrolet
27	53	Josh Bilicki (i)	Rick Ware Racing	Chevrolet
28	38	John Hunter Nemechek (R)	Front Row Motorsports	Ford
29	27	Gray Gaulding (i)	Rick Ware Racing	Ford
30	13	Ty Dillon	Germain Racing	Chevrolet
31	51	Joey Gase (i)	Petty Ware Racing	Ford
32	15	Brennan Poole (R)	Premium Motorsports	Chevrolet
33	95	Christopher Bell (R)	Leavine Family Racing	Toyota
34	34	Michael McDowell	Front Row Motorsports	Ford
35	77	J. J. Yeley (i)	Spire Motorsports	Chevrolet
36	32	Corey LaJoie	Go Fas Racing	Ford
37	96	Daniel Suárez	Gaunt Brothers Racing	Toyota
38	66	Timmy Hill (i)	MBM Motorsports	Toyota
39	78	B. J. McLeod (i)	B. J. McLeod Motorsports	Chevrolet
40	7	Reed Sorenson	Tommy Baldwin Racing	Chevrolet
Did not qualify
41	90	TBA	Team Keller Racing	Chevrolet
Official starting lineup

- Team Keller Racing did not have a driver announced when they entered for the race and they could not race since 41 cars entered for 40 spots, so their entry was excluded due to lack of owners points and their driver was not announced.

== Race ==
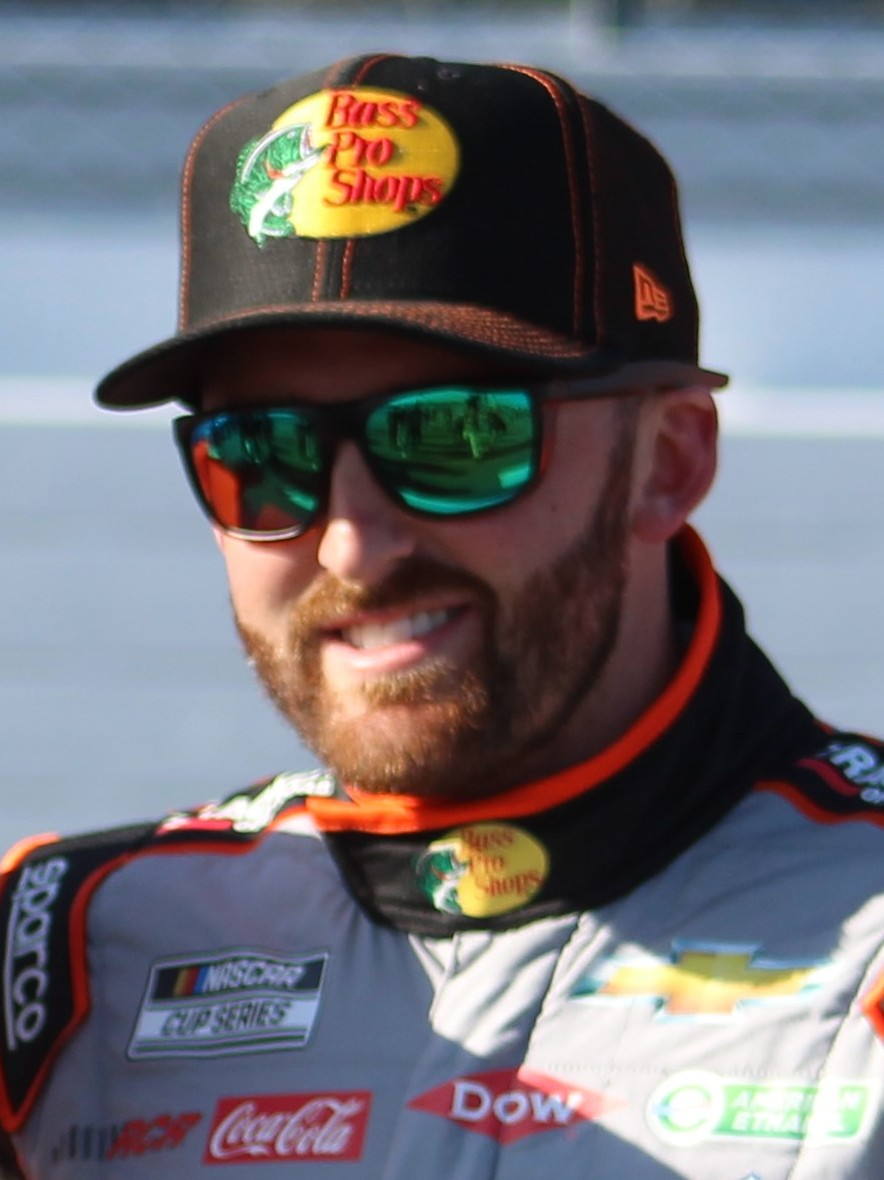
Austin Dillon won the race.

=== Stage Results ===
Stage One Laps: 105

Pos	No	Driver	Team	Manufacturer	Points
1	12	Ryan Blaney	Team Penske	Ford	10
2	18	Kyle Busch	Joe Gibbs Racing	Toyota	9
3	4	Kevin Harvick	Stewart-Haas Racing	Ford	8
4	8	Tyler Reddick (R)	Richard Childress Racing	Chevrolet	7
5	24	William Byron	Hendrick Motorsports	Chevrolet	6
6	1	Kurt Busch	Chip Ganassi Racing	Chevrolet	5
7	48	Jimmie Johnson	Hendrick Motorsports	Chevrolet	4
8	88	Alex Bowman	Hendrick Motorsports	Chevrolet	3
9	17	Chris Buescher	Roush Fenway Racing	Ford	2
10	19	Martin Truex Jr.	Joe Gibbs Racing	Toyota	1
Official stage one results

Stage Two Laps: 105

Pos	No	Driver	Team	Manufacturer	Points
1	12	Ryan Blaney	Team Penske	Ford	10
2	22	Joey Logano	Team Penske	Ford	9
3	11	Denny Hamlin	Joe Gibbs Racing	Toyota	8
4	1	Kurt Busch	Chip Ganassi Racing	Chevrolet	7
5	4	Kevin Harvick	Stewart-Haas Racing	Ford	6
6	19	Martin Truex Jr.	Joe Gibbs Racing	Toyota	5
7	9	Chase Elliott	Hendrick Motorsports	Chevrolet	4
8	10	Aric Almirola	Stewart-Haas Racing	Ford	3
9	20	Erik Jones	Joe Gibbs Racing	Toyota	2
10	18	Kyle Busch	Joe Gibbs Racing	Toyota	1
Official stage two results

=== Final Stage Results ===
Stage Three Laps: 124

Pos	Grid	No	Driver	Team	Manufacturer	Laps	Points
1	21	3	Austin Dillon	Richard Childress Racing	Chevrolet	334	40
2	24	8	Tyler Reddick (R)	Richard Childress Racing	Chevrolet	334	42
3	9	22	Joey Logano	Team Penske	Ford	334	43
4	4	18	Kyle Busch	Joe Gibbs Racing	Toyota	334	43
5	5	4	Kevin Harvick	Stewart-Haas Racing	Ford	334	46
6	23	20	Erik Jones	Joe Gibbs Racing	Toyota	334	33
7	2	12	Ryan Blaney	Team Penske	Ford	334	50
8	3	1	Kurt Busch	Chip Ganassi Racing	Chevrolet	334	41
9	6	2	Brad Keselowski	Team Penske	Ford	334	28
10	1	10	Aric Almirola	Stewart-Haas Racing	Ford	334	30
11	17	14	Clint Bowyer	Stewart-Haas Racing	Ford	334	26
12	8	9	Chase Elliott	Hendrick Motorsports	Chevrolet	334	29
13	15	6	Ryan Newman	Roush Fenway Racing	Ford	334	24
14	14	43	Bubba Wallace	Richard Petty Motorsports	Chevrolet	334	23
15	34	34	Michael McDowell	Front Row Motorsports	Ford	334	22
16	36	32	Corey LaJoie	Go Fas Racing	Ford	334	21
17	11	21	Matt DiBenedetto	Wood Brothers Racing	Ford	334	20
18	22	42	Matt Kenseth	Chip Ganassi Racing	Chevrolet	334	19
19	16	17	Chris Buescher	Roush Fenway Racing	Ford	333	20
20	7	11	Denny Hamlin	Joe Gibbs Racing	Toyota	333	25
21	33	95	Christopher Bell (R)	Leavine Family Racing	Toyota	331	16
22	28	38	John Hunter Nemechek (R)	Front Row Motorsports	Ford	331	15
23	37	96	Daniel Suárez	Gaunt Brothers Racing	Toyota	329	14
24	35	77	J. J. Yeley (i)	Spire Motorsports	Chevrolet	328	0
25	29	27	Gray Gaulding (i)	Rick Ware Racing	Ford	323	0
26	20	48	Jimmie Johnson	Hendrick Motorsports	Chevrolet	322	15
27	32	15	Brennan Poole (R)	Premium Motorsports	Chevrolet	322	10
28	40	7	Reed Sorenson	Tommy Baldwin Racing	Chevrolet	322	9
29	10	19	Martin Truex Jr.	Joe Gibbs Racing	Toyota	320	14
30	12	88	Alex Bowman	Hendrick Motorsports	Chevrolet	319	10
31	27	53	Josh Bilicki (i)	Rick Ware Racing	Chevrolet	318	0
32	31	51	Joey Gase (i)	Petty Ware Racing	Ford	318	0
33	39	78	B. J. McLeod (i)	B. J. McLeod Motorsports	Chevrolet	318	0
34	26	00	Quin Houff (R)	StarCom Racing	Chevrolet	295	3
35	30	13	Ty Dillon	Germain Racing	Chevrolet	263	2
36	38	66	Timmy Hill (i)	MBM Motorsports	Toyota	254	0
37	18	24	William Byron	Hendrick Motorsports	Chevrolet	252	7
38	13	47	Ricky Stenhouse Jr.	JTG Daugherty Racing	Chevrolet	221	1
39	19	41	Cole Custer (R)	Stewart-Haas Racing	Ford	219	1
40	25	37	Ryan Preece	JTG Daugherty Racing	Chevrolet	217	1
Official race results

=== Race statistics ===
- Lead changes: 29 among 12 different drivers
- Cautions/Laps: 10 for 45
- Red flags: 1 for 11 minutes and 29 seconds
- Time of race: 3 hours, 38 minutes and 57 seconds
- Average speed: 137.292 miles per hour (220.950 km/h)

== Media ==
=== Television ===
NBC Sports broadcast the race on NBCSN. Rick Allen, Two–time Texas winner Jeff Burton, Steve Letarte and 2000 Texas winner Dale Earnhardt Jr. covered the action from the booth at Charlotte Motor Speedway for the race. Dave Burns and Marty Snider handled the pit road duties on site. Rutledge Wood handled the features from his home during the race.

NBCSN
Booth announcers	Pit reporters	Features reporter
Lap-by-lap: Rick Allen; Color-commentator: Jeff Burton; Color-commentator: Steve Letarte; Color-commentator: Dale Earnhardt Jr.	Dave Burns; Marty Snider	Rutledge Wood

=== Radio ===
The race was broadcast on radio by the Performance Racing Network and simulcast on Sirius XM NASCAR Radio.

PRN
Booth announcers	Turn announcers	Pit reporters
Lead announcer: Doug Rice; Announcer: Mark Garrow	Turns 1 & 2: Rob Albright; Turns 3 & 4: Pat Patterson	Brad Gillie; Brett McMillan

== Standings after the race ==
Drivers' Championship standings

	Pos	Driver	Points
	1	Kevin Harvick	721
1	2	Ryan Blaney	630 (–91)
1	3	Brad Keselowski	615 (–106)
1	4	Joey Logano	607 (–114)
1	5	Chase Elliott	604 (–117)
	6	Denny Hamlin	578 (–143)
	7	Martin Truex Jr.	557 (–164)
	8	Aric Almirola	534 (–187)
1	9	Kurt Busch	533 (–188)
1	10	Kyle Busch	520 (–201)
2	11	Alex Bowman	508 (–213)
	12	Matt DiBenedetto	476 (–245)
	13	Clint Bowyer	461 (–260)
2	14	Austin Dillon	428 (–293)
	15	Jimmie Johnson	427 (–294)
2	16	William Byron	425 (–296)
Official driver's standings

Manufacturers' Championship standings

Pos	Manufacturer	Points
1	Ford	673
2	Toyota	626 (–47)
3	Chevrolet	609 (–64)

- Note: Only the first 16 positions are included for the driver standings.
- . – Driver has clinched a position in the NASCAR Cup Series playoffs.

Previous race: 2020 Quaker State 400	NASCAR Cup Series; 2020 season	Next race: 2020 Super Start Batteries 400
