= 2020 Quaker State 400 =

NASCAR Cup Series race

Race details
- Race 17 of 36 in the 2020 NASCAR Cup Series
- 2020 Quaker State 400 program cover featuring Brothers Kyle and Kurt Busch and the 2019 Quaker State 400 finish
- Date: July 12, 2020
- Location: Kentucky Speedway in Sparta, Kentucky
- Course: Permanent racing facility
- Course length: 1.5 miles (2.4 km)
- Distance: 267 laps, 400.5 mi (640.8 km)
- Average speed: 133.636 miles per hour (215.066 km/h)

Pole position
Driver	Kyle Busch	Joe Gibbs Racing
- Grid positions set by ballot

Most laps led
Driver	Aric Almirola	Stewart-Haas Racing
- Laps: 128

Winner
No. 41	Cole Custer	Stewart-Haas Racing

Television in the United States
- Network: FS1
- Announcers: Mike Joy and Jeff Gordon
- Nielsen ratings: 2.575 million

Radio in the United States
- Radio: PRN
- Booth announcers: Doug Rice and Mark Garrow
- Turn announcers: Doug Turnbull (1 & 2) and Pat Patterson (3 & 4)

The 2020 Quaker State 400 presented by Walmart was a NASCAR Cup Series race held on July 12, 2020, at Kentucky Speedway in Sparta, Kentucky. Contested over 267 laps on the 1.5-mile (2.4 km) speedway, it was the 17th race of the 2020 NASCAR Cup Series. Cole Custer became the 1st rookie in series history to claim his 1st career win at the track as well as the 33rd different driver to have won a race in all three NASCAR national touring series.

== Report ==
=== Background ===
Layout of Kentucky Speedway

The tenth running of the Quaker State 400 was held in Sparta, Kentucky at Kentucky Speedway on July 9, 2016. The track is a 1.5-mile (2.4 km) tri-oval speedway owned by Speedway Motorsports, Inc. Kentucky Speedway, which has also hosted the ARCA Menards Series, NASCAR Gander RV & Outdoors Truck Series, NASCAR Xfinity Series, and the Indy Racing League, has a grandstand seating capacity of 107,000.

==== Entry list ====
- (R) denotes rookie driver.
- (i) denotes driver who are ineligible for series driver points.

No.	Driver	Team	Manufacturer
00	Quin Houff (R)	StarCom Racing	Chevrolet
1	Kurt Busch	Chip Ganassi Racing	Chevrolet
2	Brad Keselowski	Team Penske	Ford
3	Austin Dillon	Richard Childress Racing	Chevrolet
4	Kevin Harvick	Stewart-Haas Racing	Ford
6	Ryan Newman	Roush Fenway Racing	Ford
8	Tyler Reddick (R)	Richard Childress Racing	Chevrolet
9	Chase Elliott	Hendrick Motorsports	Chevrolet
10	Aric Almirola	Stewart-Haas Racing	Ford
11	Denny Hamlin	Joe Gibbs Racing	Toyota
12	Ryan Blaney	Team Penske	Ford
13	Ty Dillon	Germain Racing	Chevrolet
14	Clint Bowyer	Stewart-Haas Racing	Ford
15	Brennan Poole (R)	Premium Motorsports	Chevrolet
17	Chris Buescher	Roush Fenway Racing	Ford
18	Kyle Busch	Joe Gibbs Racing	Toyota
19	Martin Truex Jr.	Joe Gibbs Racing	Toyota
20	Erik Jones	Joe Gibbs Racing	Toyota
21	Matt DiBenedetto	Wood Brothers Racing	Ford
22	Joey Logano	Team Penske	Ford
24	William Byron	Hendrick Motorsports	Chevrolet
27	J. J. Yeley (i)	Rick Ware Racing	Ford
32	Corey LaJoie	Go Fas Racing	Ford
34	Michael McDowell	Front Row Motorsports	Ford
37	Ryan Preece	JTG Daugherty Racing	Chevrolet
38	John Hunter Nemechek (R)	Front Row Motorsports	Ford
41	Cole Custer (R)	Stewart-Haas Racing	Ford
42	Matt Kenseth	Chip Ganassi Racing	Chevrolet
43	Bubba Wallace	Richard Petty Motorsports	Chevrolet
47	Ricky Stenhouse Jr.	JTG Daugherty Racing	Chevrolet
48	Jimmie Johnson	Hendrick Motorsports	Chevrolet
51	Joey Gase (i)	Petty Ware Racing	Ford
53	Garrett Smithley (i)	Rick Ware Racing	Chevrolet
66	Timmy Hill (i)	MBM Motorsports	Toyota
77	Josh Bilicki (i)	Spire Motorsports	Chevrolet
88	Alex Bowman	Hendrick Motorsports	Chevrolet
95	Christopher Bell (R)	Leavine Family Racing	Toyota
96	Daniel Suárez	Gaunt Brothers Racing	Toyota
Official entry list

== Qualifying ==
Kyle Busch was awarded the pole for the race as determined by a random draw.

=== Starting Lineup ===
Pos	No.	Driver	Team	Manufacturer
1	18	Kyle Busch	Joe Gibbs Racing	Toyota
2	22	Joey Logano	Team Penske	Ford
3	4	Kevin Harvick	Stewart-Haas Racing	Ford
4	10	Aric Almirola	Stewart-Haas Racing	Ford
5	88	Alex Bowman	Hendrick Motorsports	Chevrolet
6	2	Brad Keselowski	Team Penske	Ford
7	1	Kurt Busch	Chip Ganassi Racing	Chevrolet
8	9	Chase Elliott	Hendrick Motorsports	Chevrolet
9	19	Martin Truex Jr.	Joe Gibbs Racing	Toyota
10	21	Matt DiBenedetto	Wood Brothers Racing	Ford
11	12	Ryan Blaney	Team Penske	Ford
12	11	Denny Hamlin	Joe Gibbs Racing	Toyota
13	17	Chris Buescher	Roush Fenway Racing	Ford
14	47	Ricky Stenhouse Jr.	JTG Daugherty Racing	Chevrolet
15	14	Clint Bowyer	Stewart-Haas Racing	Ford
16	20	Erik Jones	Joe Gibbs Racing	Toyota
17	42	Matt Kenseth	Chip Ganassi Racing	Chevrolet
18	43	Bubba Wallace	Richard Petty Motorsports	Chevrolet
19	3	Austin Dillon	Richard Childress Racing	Chevrolet
20	48	Jimmie Johnson	Hendrick Motorsports	Chevrolet
21	24	William Byron	Hendrick Motorsports	Chevrolet
22	38	John Hunter Nemechek (R)	Front Row Motorsports	Ford
23	6	Ryan Newman	Roush Fenway Racing	Ford
24	8	Tyler Reddick (R)	Richard Childress Racing	Chevrolet
25	53	Garrett Smithley (i)	Rick Ware Racing	Chevrolet
26	77	Josh Bilicki (i)	Spire Motorsports	Chevrolet
27	32	Corey LaJoie	Go Fas Racing	Ford
28	00	Quin Houff (R)	StarCom Racing	Chevrolet
29	41	Cole Custer (R)	Stewart-Haas Racing	Ford
30	34	Michael McDowell	Front Row Motorsports	Ford
31	15	Brennan Poole (R)	Premium Motorsports	Chevrolet
32	37	Ryan Preece	JTG Daugherty Racing	Chevrolet
33	13	Ty Dillon	Germain Racing	Chevrolet
34	95	Christopher Bell (R)	Leavine Family Racing	Toyota
35	51	Joey Gase (i)	Petty Ware Racing	Ford
36	27	J. J. Yeley (i)	Rick Ware Racing	Ford
37	96	Daniel Suárez	Gaunt Brothers Racing	Toyota
38	66	Timmy Hill (i)	MBM Motorsports	Toyota
Official starting lineup

== Race ==
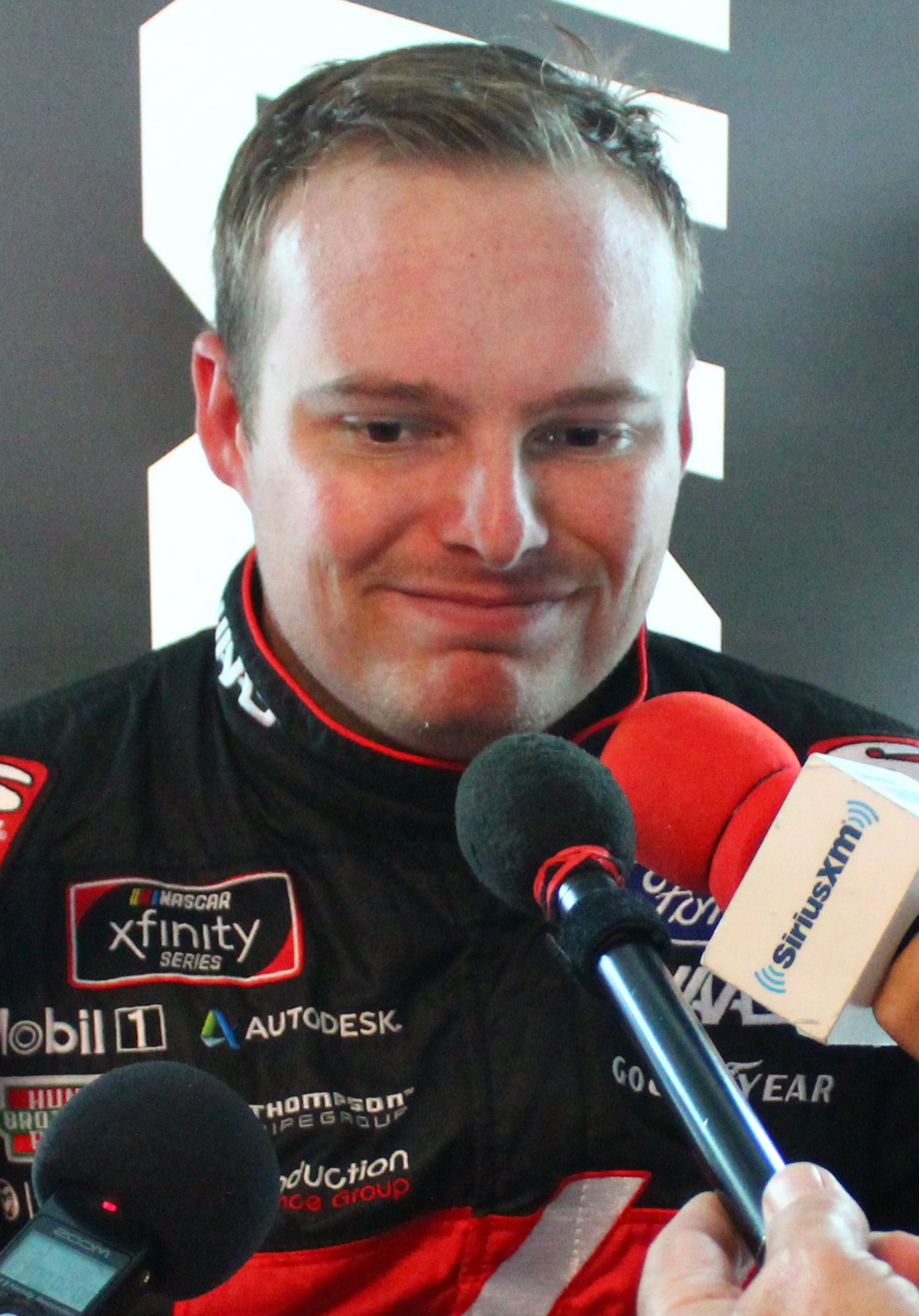
Cole Custer scored his first career win.

=== Stage Results ===
Stage One Laps: 80

Pos	No	Driver	Team	Manufacturer	Points
1	10	Aric Almirola	Stewart-Haas Racing	Ford	10
2	9	Chase Elliott	Hendrick Motorsports	Chevrolet	9
3	22	Joey Logano	Team Penske	Ford	8
4	21	Matt DiBenedetto	Wood Brothers Racing	Ford	7
5	12	Ryan Blaney	Team Penske	Ford	6
6	4	Kevin Harvick	Stewart-Haas Racing	Ford	5
7	88	Alex Bowman	Hendrick Motorsports	Chevrolet	4
8	1	Kurt Busch	Chip Ganassi Racing	Chevrolet	3
9	14	Clint Bowyer	Stewart-Haas Racing	Ford	2
10	19	Martin Truex Jr.	Joe Gibbs Racing	Toyota	1
Official stage one results

Stage Two Laps: 80

Pos	No	Driver	Team	Manufacturer	Points
1	2	Brad Keselowski	Team Penske	Ford	10
2	12	Ryan Blaney	Team Penske	Ford	9
3	41	Cole Custer (R)	Stewart-Haas Racing	Ford	8
4	22	Joey Logano	Team Penske	Ford	7
5	19	Martin Truex Jr.	Joe Gibbs Racing	Toyota	6
6	88	Alex Bowman	Hendrick Motorsports	Chevrolet	5
7	3	Austin Dillon	Richard Childress Racing	Chevrolet	4
8	48	Jimmie Johnson	Hendrick Motorsports	Chevrolet	3
9	21	Matt DiBenedetto	Wood Brothers Racing	Ford	2
10	20	Erik Jones	Joe Gibbs Racing	Toyota	1
Official stage two results

=== Final Lap ===
With 7 laps to go, Kevin Harvick was leading the race but a caution came out when Matt Kenseth spun in turn 4. As a result, the field would be bunched up and the race would go into overtime. Harvick was the leader and chose the outside for the restart with Martin Truex Jr. in 2nd, Ryan Blaney in 3rd, Brad Keselowski in 4th, Kurt Busch in 5th, and Cole Custer in 6th. On the restart, Custer made a move on the outside of Keselowski and took the 4th spot from Keselowski. Off of 2, Kevin Harvick took the lead from Martin Truex Jr. but Truex came up into Harvick causing Harvick to get loose. In turn 3, Truex made a move to the outside to take the lead from Harvick but the two left the inside open and Ryan Blaney went to the inside to make it 3 wide heading to the white flag. As the white flag flew, Custer made a move to the outside and made it 4 wide for the lead. Custer took the lead in turn 1 and never gave it up scoring his first Cup Series victory in his 20th Cup Series start and becoming the first rookie to score a win at Kentucky.

=== Final Stage Results ===
Stage Three Laps: 107

Pos	Grid	No	Driver	Team	Manufacturer	Laps	Points
1	29	41	Cole Custer (R)	Stewart-Haas Racing	Ford	267	48
2	9	19	Martin Truex Jr.	Joe Gibbs Racing	Toyota	267	42
3	10	21	Matt DiBenedetto	Wood Brothers Racing	Ford	267	43
4	3	4	Kevin Harvick	Stewart-Haas Racing	Ford	267	38
5	7	1	Kurt Busch	Chip Ganassi Racing	Chevrolet	267	35
6	11	12	Ryan Blaney	Team Penske	Ford	267	46
7	34	95	Christopher Bell (R)	Leavine Family Racing	Toyota	267	30
8	4	10	Aric Almirola	Stewart-Haas Racing	Ford	267	39
9	6	2	Brad Keselowski	Team Penske	Ford	267	38
10	24	8	Tyler Reddick (R)	Richard Childress Racing	Chevrolet	267	27
11	21	24	William Byron	Hendrick Motorsports	Chevrolet	267	26
12	12	11	Denny Hamlin	Joe Gibbs Racing	Toyota	267	25
13	19	3	Austin Dillon	Richard Childress Racing	Chevrolet	267	28
14	15	14	Clint Bowyer	Stewart-Haas Racing	Ford	267	25
15	2	22	Joey Logano	Team Penske	Ford	267	37
16	33	13	Ty Dillon	Germain Racing	Chevrolet	267	21
17	23	6	Ryan Newman	Roush Fenway Racing	Ford	267	20
18	20	48	Jimmie Johnson	Hendrick Motorsports	Chevrolet	267	22
19	5	88	Alex Bowman	Hendrick Motorsports	Chevrolet	267	27
20	13	17	Chris Buescher	Roush Fenway Racing	Ford	267	17
21	1	18	Kyle Busch	Joe Gibbs Racing	Toyota	267	16
22	16	20	Erik Jones	Joe Gibbs Racing	Toyota	267	16
23	8	9	Chase Elliott	Hendrick Motorsports	Chevrolet	267	23
24	30	34	Michael McDowell	Front Row Motorsports	Ford	267	13
25	17	42	Matt Kenseth	Chip Ganassi Racing	Chevrolet	267	12
26	37	96	Daniel Suárez	Gaunt Brothers Racing	Toyota	267	11
27	18	43	Bubba Wallace	Richard Petty Motorsports	Chevrolet	265	10
28	27	32	Corey LaJoie	Go Fas Racing	Ford	264	9
29	14	47	Ricky Stenhouse Jr.	JTG Daugherty Racing	Chevrolet	264	8
30	36	27	J. J. Yeley (i)	Rick Ware Racing	Ford	260	0
31	31	15	Brennan Poole (R)	Premium Motorsports	Chevrolet	259	6
32	26	77	Josh Bilicki (i)	Spire Motorsports	Chevrolet	257	0
33	25	53	Garrett Smithley (i)	Rick Ware Racing	Chevrolet	257	0
34	35	51	Joey Gase (i)	Petty Ware Racing	Ford	257	0
35	28	00	Quin Houff (R)	StarCom Racing	Chevrolet	255	2
36	22	38	John Hunter Nemechek (R)	Front Row Motorsports	Ford	248	1
37	38	66	Timmy Hill (i)	MBM Motorsports	Toyota	170	0
38	32	37	Ryan Preece	JTG Daugherty Racing	Chevrolet	159	1
Official race results

=== Race statistics ===
- Lead changes: 13 among 9 different drivers
- Cautions/Laps: 8 for 42
- Red flags: 0
- Time of race: 2 hours, 59 minutes and 49 seconds
- Average speed: 133.636 miles per hour (215.066 km/h)

== Media ==
=== Television ===
Fox Sports televised the race in the United States on FS1. Mike Joy and Jeff Gordon covered the race from the Fox Sports studio in Charlotte. Jamie Little handled the pit road duties. Larry McReynolds provided insight from the Fox Sports studio in Charlotte.

FS1
Booth announcers	Pit reporter	In-race analyst
Lap-by-lap: Mike Joy; Color-commentator: Jeff Gordon	Jamie Little	Larry McReynolds

=== Radio ===
PRN had the radio call for the race, which was simulcast on Sirius XM NASCAR Radio. Doug Rice and Mark Garrow called the action from the booth when the field raced down the front straightaway. Doug Turnbull called the action from turns 1 & 2 and Pat Patterson called the action from turns 3 & 4. Brad Gillie, Brett McMillan and Wendy Venturini called the duties on pit lane.

PRN
Booth announcers	Turn announcers	Pit reporters
Lead announcer: Doug Rice; Announcer: Mark Garrow	Turns 1 & 2: Doug Turnbull; Turns 3 & 4: Pat Patterson	Brad Gillie; Brett McMillan; Wendy Venturini

== Standings after the race ==
Drivers' Championship standings

	Pos	Driver	Points
	1	Kevin Harvick	675
1	2	Brad Keselowski	587 (–88)
1	3	Ryan Blaney	580 (–95)
2	4	Chase Elliott	575 (–100)
1	5	Joey Logano	564 (–111)
1	6	Denny Hamlin	553 (–122)
	7	Martin Truex Jr.	543 (–132)
1	8	Aric Almirola	504 (–171)
1	9	Alex Bowman	498 (–177)
1	10	Kurt Busch	492 (–183)
1	11	Kyle Busch	477 (–198)
	12	Matt DiBenedetto	456 (–219)
	13	Clint Bowyer	435 (–240)
	14	William Byron	418 (–257)
	15	Jimmie Johnson	412 (–263)
	16	Austin Dillon	388 (–287)
Official driver's standings

Manufacturers' Championship standings

Pos	Manufacturer	Points
1	Ford	639
2	Toyota	593 (–46)
3	Chevrolet	569 (–70)

- Note: Only the first 16 positions are included for the driver standings.
- . – Driver has clinched a position in the NASCAR Cup Series playoffs.

Previous race: 2020 Brickyard 400	NASCAR Cup Series; 2020 season	Next race: 2020 O'Reilly Auto Parts 500
