= 2021 Bass Pro Shops NRA Night Race =

NASCAR Cup Series race

Race details
- Race 29 of 36 in the 2021 NASCAR Cup Series
- Date: September 18, 2021
- Location: Bristol Motor Speedway in Bristol, Tennessee
- Course: Permanent racing facility
- Course length: .533 miles (.858 km)
- Distance: 500 laps, 266.5 mi (429 km)
- Average speed: 87.409 miles per hour (140.671 km/h)

Pole position
Driver	Martin Truex Jr.	Joe Gibbs Racing
- Grid positions set by competition-based formula

Most laps led
Driver	Kyle Larson	Hendrick Motorsports
- Laps: 175

Winner
No. 5	Kyle Larson	Hendrick Motorsports

Television in the United States
- Network: NBCSN
- Announcers: Rick Allen, Jeff Burton, Steve Letarte and Dale Earnhardt Jr.

Radio in the United States
- Radio: PRN
- Booth announcers: Doug Rice and Mark Garrow
- Turn announcers: Rob Albright (Backstretch)

The 2021 Bass Pro Shops NRA Night Race was a NASCAR Cup Series race held on September 18, 2021 at Bristol Motor Speedway in Bristol, Tennessee. Contested over 500 laps on the .533-mile (0.858 km) short track, it was the 29th race of the 2021 NASCAR Cup Series season, third race of the Playoffs and final race of the Round of 16.

The race was won by Kyle Larson. Tyler Reddick, Aric Almirola, Kurt Busch and Michael McDowell were eliminated from the round of 16.

== Report ==
=== Background ===
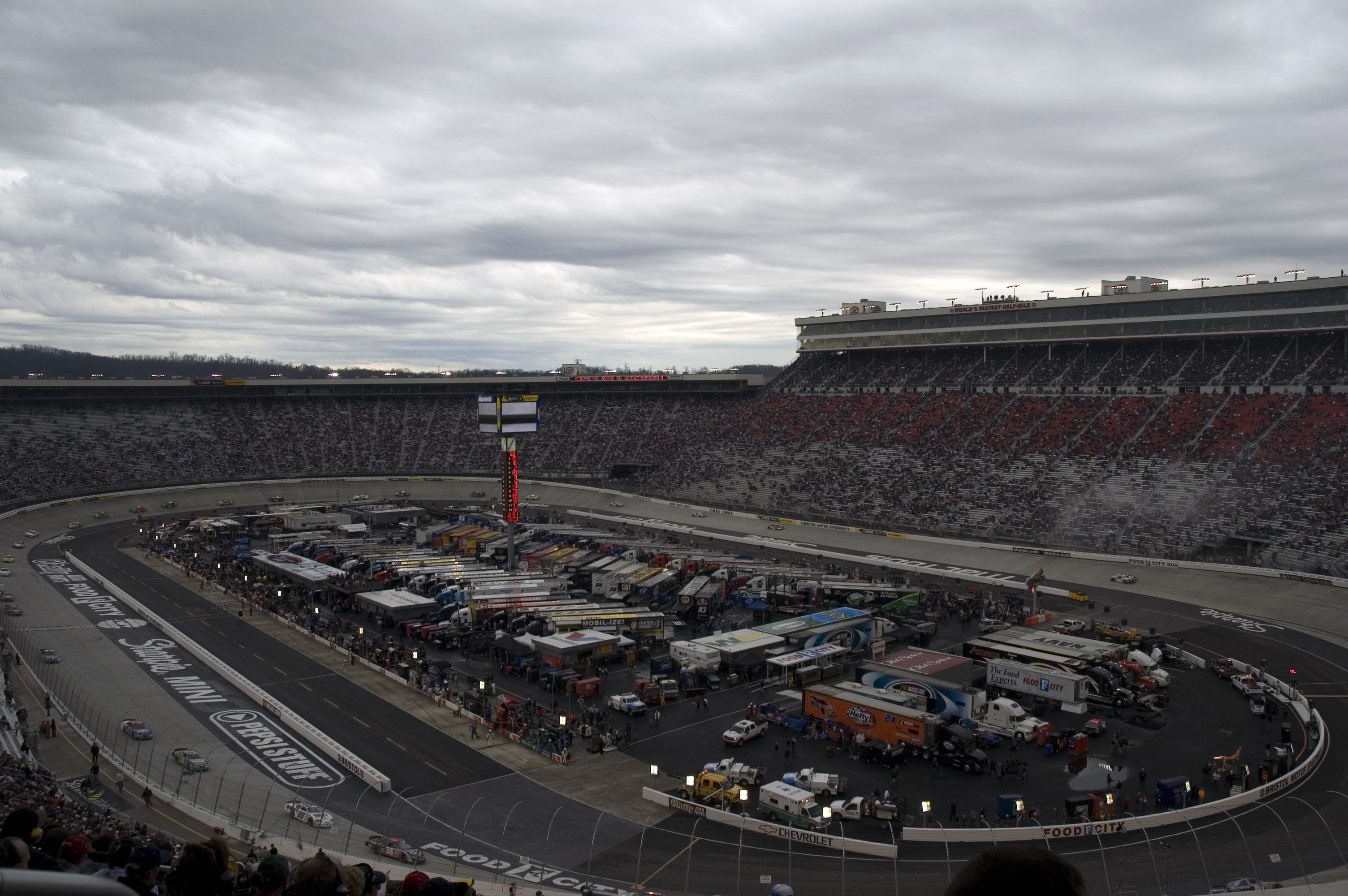
Bristol Motor Speedway, the track where the race was held.

The 2021 Bass Pro Shops NRA Night Race program cover, featuring Dale Earnhardt Jr. “It”s Bristol, Baby!”

The Bristol Motor Speedway, formerly known as Bristol International Raceway and Bristol Raceway, is a NASCAR short track venue located in Bristol, Tennessee. Constructed in 1960, it held its first NASCAR race on July 30, 1961. Despite its short length, Bristol is among the most popular tracks on the NASCAR schedule because of its distinct features, which include extraordinarily steep banking, an all concrete surface, two pit roads, and stadium-like seating. It has also been named one of the loudest NASCAR tracks.

==== Entry list ====
- (R) denotes rookie driver.
- (i) denotes driver who are ineligible for series driver points.

No.	Driver	Team	Manufacturer
00	Quin Houff	StarCom Racing	Chevrolet
1	Kurt Busch	Chip Ganassi Racing	Chevrolet
2	Brad Keselowski	Team Penske	Ford
3	Austin Dillon	Richard Childress Racing	Chevrolet
4	Kevin Harvick	Stewart-Haas Racing	Ford
5	Kyle Larson	Hendrick Motorsports	Chevrolet
6	Ryan Newman	Roush Fenway Racing	Ford
7	Corey LaJoie	Spire Motorsports	Chevrolet
8	Tyler Reddick	Richard Childress Racing	Chevrolet
9	Chase Elliott	Hendrick Motorsports	Chevrolet
10	Aric Almirola	Stewart-Haas Racing	Ford
11	Denny Hamlin	Joe Gibbs Racing	Toyota
12	Ryan Blaney	Team Penske	Ford
14	Chase Briscoe (R)	Stewart-Haas Racing	Ford
15	James Davison	Rick Ware Racing	Chevrolet
17	Chris Buescher	Roush Fenway Racing	Ford
18	Kyle Busch	Joe Gibbs Racing	Toyota
19	Martin Truex Jr.	Joe Gibbs Racing	Toyota
20	Christopher Bell	Joe Gibbs Racing	Toyota
21	Matt DiBenedetto	Wood Brothers Racing	Ford
22	Joey Logano	Team Penske	Ford
23	Bubba Wallace	23XI Racing	Toyota
24	William Byron	Hendrick Motorsports	Chevrolet
34	Michael McDowell	Front Row Motorsports	Ford
37	Ryan Preece	JTG Daugherty Racing	Chevrolet
38	Anthony Alfredo (R)	Front Row Motorsports	Ford
41	Cole Custer	Stewart-Haas Racing	Ford
42	Ross Chastain	Chip Ganassi Racing	Chevrolet
43	Erik Jones	Richard Petty Motorsports	Chevrolet
47	Ricky Stenhouse Jr.	JTG Daugherty Racing	Chevrolet
48	Alex Bowman	Hendrick Motorsports	Chevrolet
51	J. J. Yeley (i)	Petty Ware Racing	Chevrolet
52	Josh Bilicki	Rick Ware Racing	Ford
53	Garrett Smithley (i)	Rick Ware Racing	Chevrolet
66	David Starr (i)	MBM Motorsports	Toyota
77	Justin Haley (i)	Spire Motorsports	Chevrolet
78	B. J. McLeod (i)	Live Fast Motorsports	Ford
99	Daniel Suárez	Trackhouse Racing Team	Chevrolet
Official entry list

== Qualifying ==
Martin Truex Jr. was awarded the pole for the race as determined by competition-based formula.

=== Starting Lineup ===
Pos	No.	Driver	Team	Manufacturer
1	19	Martin Truex Jr.	Joe Gibbs Racing	Toyota
2	11	Denny Hamlin	Joe Gibbs Racing	Toyota
3	22	Joey Logano	Team Penske	Ford
4	9	Chase Elliott	Hendrick Motorsports	Chevrolet
5	5	Kyle Larson	Hendrick Motorsports	Chevrolet
6	20	Christopher Bell	Joe Gibbs Racing	Toyota
7	12	Ryan Blaney	Team Penske	Ford
8	4	Kevin Harvick	Stewart-Haas Racing	Ford
9	18	Kyle Busch	Joe Gibbs Racing	Toyota
10	2	Brad Keselowski	Team Penske	Ford
11	48	Alex Bowman	Hendrick Motorsports	Chevrolet
12	10	Aric Almirola	Stewart-Haas Racing	Ford
13	8	Tyler Reddick	Richard Childress Racing	Chevrolet
14	24	William Byron	Hendrick Motorsports	Chevrolet
15	1	Kurt Busch	Chip Ganassi Racing	Chevrolet
16	34	Michael McDowell	Front Row Motorsports	Ford
17	42	Ross Chastain	Chip Ganassi Racing	Chevrolet
18	3	Austin Dillon	Richard Childress Racing	Chevrolet
19	21	Matt DiBenedetto	Wood Brothers Racing	Ford
20	14	Chase Briscoe (R)	Stewart-Haas Racing	Ford
21	99	Daniel Suárez	Trackhouse Racing Team	Chevrolet
22	43	Erik Jones	Richard Petty Motorsports	Chevrolet
23	47	Ricky Stenhouse Jr.	JTG Daugherty Racing	Chevrolet
24	6	Ryan Newman	Roush Fenway Racing	Ford
25	17	Chris Buescher	Roush Fenway Racing	Ford
26	41	Cole Custer	Stewart-Haas Racing	Ford
27	37	Ryan Preece	JTG Daugherty Racing	Chevrolet
28	23	Bubba Wallace	23XI Racing	Toyota
29	77	Justin Haley (i)	Spire Motorsports	Chevrolet
30	38	Anthony Alfredo (R)	Front Row Motorsports	Ford
31	7	Corey LaJoie	Spire Motorsports	Chevrolet
32	78	B. J. McLeod (i)	Live Fast Motorsports	Ford
33	52	Josh Bilicki	Rick Ware Racing	Ford
34	00	Quin Houff	StarCom Racing	Chevrolet
35	51	J. J. Yeley (i)	Petty Ware Racing	Chevrolet
36	53	Garrett Smithley (i)	Rick Ware Racing	Chevrolet
37	15	James Davison	Rick Ware Racing	Chevrolet
38	66	David Starr (i)	MBM Motorsports	Toyota
Official starting lineup

== Race ==
Martin Truex Jr. earned the pole position for the start of the race, where he led the first five laps. Denny Hamlin won stage one after passing Kyle Larson on lap 90. A red flag occurred for nearly eight minutes following a turn 4 incident that involved four vehicles on lap 221. Larson led at the end of stage two. On lap 464, Chase Elliott was forced to pit from the lead when he had a flat tire from damage he received when Kevin Harvick got into his rear quarter panel. When he got back on the track, Elliott attempted to retaliate by getting into the side of then race leader Harvick and then running Harvick's preferred line, thus slowing him down. Larson was able to pass Harvick on lap 497, and secure his 12th overall Cup Series win. Following the race, Harvick and Elliott bumped cars on pit road and confronted each other when they eventually parked. The two had a heated conversation with Elliott pointing at Harvick while Harvick had his helmet still on with both their crew members and NASCAR officials trying to break up the fight. The two got into a bit of a shoving match when Elliott pushed on Harvick's helmet before they were both separated. Frustrated, Harvick took off his helmet and slammed it on the roof of his car just barely missing his glasses. Both drivers got interviewed where the mics were piped into the speakers of the track for the fans to hear. Harvick said, "I just told him it was kind of a chicken shit move that he did there at the end you know. We're racing for the freaking win at Bristol. We're three-wide in the middle and he throws a temper tantrum like I was just trying to get the lead and racing hard, then he pulls up in front of me, and just sits there until I lose the whole lead." He ended by saying "God Damn. I'm about to rip somebody's freaking head off." Elliott said, "It's something [Harvick] does all the time. He runs into your left side constantly at other tracks and sometimes it does cut down your left side (tires), other times it doesn't." After their interviews, the two met again near the haulers where they continued to disagree with the situation. The argument continued for several minutes eventually continuing inside Elliott's hauler as the two didn't want cameras around them. Michael McDowell, Kurt Busch, Tyler Reddick, and Aric Almirola were eliminated from the Playoffs.

=== Stage Results ===
Stage One Laps: 125

Pos	No	Driver	Team	Manufacturer	Points
1	11	Denny Hamlin	Joe Gibbs Racing	Toyota	10
2	5	Kyle Larson	Hendrick Motorsports	Chevrolet	9
3	9	Chase Elliott	Hendrick Motorsports	Chevrolet	8
4	2	Brad Keselowski	Team Penske	Ford	7
5	12	Ryan Blaney	Team Penske	Ford	6
6	4	Kevin Harvick	Stewart-Haas Racing	Ford	5
7	18	Kyle Busch	Joe Gibbs Racing	Toyota	4
8	20	Christopher Bell	Joe Gibbs Racing	Toyota	3
9	19	Martin Truex Jr.	Joe Gibbs Racing	Toyota	2
10	24	William Byron	Hendrick Motorsports	Chevrolet	1
Official stage one results

Stage Two Laps: 125

Pos	No	Driver	Team	Manufacturer	Points
1	5	Kyle Larson	Hendrick Motorsports	Chevrolet	10
2	11	Denny Hamlin	Joe Gibbs Racing	Toyota	9
3	2	Brad Keselowski	Team Penske	Ford	8
4	24	William Byron	Hendrick Motorsports	Chevrolet	7
5	9	Chase Elliott	Hendrick Motorsports	Chevrolet	6
6	4	Kevin Harvick	Stewart-Haas Racing	Ford	5
7	12	Ryan Blaney	Team Penske	Ford	4
8	20	Christopher Bell	Joe Gibbs Racing	Toyota	3
9	8	Tyler Reddick	Richard Childress Racing	Chevrolet	2
10	18	Kyle Busch	Joe Gibbs Racing	Toyota	1
Official stage two results

=== Final Stage Results ===
Stage Three Laps: 250

Pos	Grid	No	Driver	Team	Manufacturer	Laps	Points
1	5	5	Kyle Larson	Hendrick Motorsports	Chevrolet	500	59
2	8	4	Kevin Harvick	Stewart-Haas Racing	Ford	500	45
3	14	24	William Byron	Hendrick Motorsports	Chevrolet	500	42
4	7	12	Ryan Blaney	Team Penske	Ford	500	43
5	11	48	Alex Bowman	Hendrick Motorsports	Chevrolet	500	32
6	10	2	Brad Keselowski	Team Penske	Ford	500	46
7	1	19	Martin Truex Jr.	Joe Gibbs Racing	Toyota	500	32
8	22	43	Erik Jones	Richard Petty Motorsports	Chevrolet	500	29
9	2	11	Denny Hamlin	Joe Gibbs Racing	Toyota	500	47
10	19	21	Matt DiBenedetto	Wood Brothers Racing	Ford	500	27
11	3	22	Joey Logano	Team Penske	Ford	500	26
12	13	8	Tyler Reddick	Richard Childress Racing	Chevrolet	500	27
13	20	14	Chase Briscoe (R)	Stewart-Haas Racing	Ford	500	24
14	17	42	Ross Chastain	Chip Ganassi Racing	Chevrolet	500	23
15	18	3	Austin Dillon	Richard Childress Racing	Chevrolet	500	22
16	28	23	Bubba Wallace	23XI Racing	Toyota	500	21
17	27	37	Ryan Preece	JTG Daugherty Racing	Chevrolet	500	20
18	12	10	Aric Almirola	Stewart-Haas Racing	Ford	500	19
19	15	1	Kurt Busch	Chip Ganassi Racing	Chevrolet	500	18
20	23	47	Ricky Stenhouse Jr.	JTG Daugherty Racing	Chevrolet	499	17
21	9	18	Kyle Busch	Joe Gibbs Racing	Toyota	499	21
22	21	99	Daniel Suárez	Trackhouse Racing Team	Chevrolet	498	15
23	25	17	Chris Buescher	Roush Fenway Racing	Ford	498	14
24	16	34	Michael McDowell	Front Row Motorsports	Ford	498	13
25	4	9	Chase Elliott	Hendrick Motorsports	Chevrolet	497	26
26	31	7	Corey LaJoie	Spire Motorsports	Chevrolet	497	11
27	35	51	J. J. Yeley (i)	Petty Ware Racing	Chevrolet	495	0
28	26	41	Cole Custer	Stewart-Haas Racing	Ford	494	9
29	6	20	Christopher Bell	Joe Gibbs Racing	Toyota	493	14
30	36	53	Garrett Smithley (i)	Rick Ware Racing	Chevrolet	487	0
31	33	52	Josh Bilicki	Rick Ware Racing	Ford	482	6
32	38	66	David Starr (i)	MBM Motorsports	Toyota	482	0
33	37	15	James Davison	Rick Ware Racing	Chevrolet	474	4
34	34	00	Quin Houff	StarCom Racing	Chevrolet	375	3
35	30	38	Anthony Alfredo (R)	Front Row Motorsports	Ford	313	2
36	29	77	Justin Haley (i)	Spire Motorsports	Chevrolet	216	0
37	32	78	B. J. McLeod (i)	Live Fast Motorsports	Ford	215	0
38	24	6	Ryan Newman	Roush Fenway Racing	Ford	177	1
Official race results

=== Race statistics ===
- Lead changes: 23 among 7 different drivers
- Cautions/Laps: 8 for 71
- Red flags: 1 for 7 minutes and 53 seconds
- Time of race: 3 hours, 2 minutes and 56 seconds
- Average speed: 87.409 miles per hour (140.671 km/h)

== Media ==
=== Television ===
NBC Sports covered the race on the television side. Rick Allen, 2008 Food City 500 winner Jeff Burton, Steve Letarte and Dale Earnhardt Jr. called the race from the broadcast booth. Dave Burns, Marty Snider and Dillon Welch handled the pit road duties from pit lane. Rutledge Wood handled the features from the track.

NBCSN
Booth announcers	Pit reporters	Features reporter
Lap-by-lap: Rick Allen; Color-commentator: Jeff Burton; Color-commentator: Steve Letarte; Color-commentator: Dale Earnhardt Jr.	Dave Burns; Marty Snider; Dillon Welch	Rutledge Wood

=== Radio ===
PRN had the radio call for the race, which was also simulcast on Sirius XM NASCAR Radio. Doug Rice and Mark Garrow called the race from the booth when the field races down the frontstretch. Rob Albright called the race when the field races down the backstretch. Brad Gillie, Brett McMillan, Alan Cavanna, and Wendy Venturini handled the duties on pit lane.

PRN
Booth announcers	Turn announcers	Pit reporters
Lead announcer: Doug Rice; Announcer: Mark Garrow	Backstretch: Rob Albright	Brad Gillie; Brett McMillan; Alan Cavanna; Wendy Venturini

== Standings after the race ==
Drivers' Championship standings

	Pos	Driver	Points
	1	Kyle Larson	3,059
1	2	Martin Truex Jr.	3,029 (–30)
1	3	Denny Hamlin	3,024 (–35)
1	4	Ryan Blaney	3,024 (–35)
5	5	Kyle Busch	3,022 (–37)
1	6	Chase Elliott	3,021 (–38)
6	7	Alex Bowman	3,015 (–44)
7	8	William Byron	3,014 (–45)
5	9	Joey Logano	3,013 (–46)
1	10	Brad Keselowski	3,008 (–51)
3	11	Christopher Bell	3,005 (–54)
6	12	Kevin Harvick	3,002 (–57)
2	13	Aric Almirola	2,075 (–984)
	14	Tyler Reddick	2,075 (–984)
3	15	Kurt Busch	2,071 (–988)
	16	Michael McDowell	2,028 (–1,031)
Official driver's standings

Manufacturers' Championship standings

Pos	Manufacturer	Points
1	Chevrolet	1,068
2	Ford	1,001 (–67)
3	Toyota	990 (–78)

- Note: Only the first 16 positions are included for the driver standings.

Previous race: 2021 Federated Auto Parts 400	NASCAR Cup Series; 2021 season	Next race: 2021 South Point 400
