= Rick Ware Racing =

American racing team

- Owner: Rick Ware
- Base: Concord, North Carolina
- Series: Current: NASCAR Cup Series; NASCAR Canada Series; ARCA Menards Series; American Flat Track; NHRA Mission Foods Drag Racing Series; Former: NASCAR Xfinity Series; NASCAR Camping World Truck Series; ARCA Menards Series East; IndyCar Series; Asian Le Mans
- Race drivers: Cup Series: 51. Cody Ware; Canada Series: No. 15. TBA; No. 51. D. J. Kennington; ARCA Menards Series: 51. Patrick Staropoli (part-time); NHRA: 15. Tony Schumacher; 51. Clay Millican
- Manufacturer: Chevrolet
- Opened: 1995
- Website: wareracing.com

Career
- Debut: 1995
- Latest race: Cup Series: 2026 Season Finale 400 (Homestead); Xfinity Series: 2021 NASCAR Xfinity Series Championship Race (Phoenix); NASCAR Camping World Truck Series: 2017 Toyota Tundra 250 (Kansas); Canada Series: 2026 NTN BCA 200 (Delaware Speedway); ARCA Menards Series: 2026 General Tire 100 at The Glen (Watkins Glen); ARCA Menards Series East: 2025 Bush's Beans 200 (Bristol); IndyCar Series: 2024 Big Machine Music City Grand Prix (Nashville)
- Drivers' Championships: Total: 1 NASCAR Cup Series: 0 NASCAR Xfinity Series: 0 NASCAR Camping World Truck Series: 0 ARCA Menards Series: 0 ARCA Menards Series East: 0 NASCAR Canada Series: 0 IndyCar Series: 0 Asian Le Mans: 1
- Race victories: Total: 5 NASCAR Cup Series: 0 NASCAR Xfinity Series: 0 NASCAR Camping World Truck Series: 0 ARCA Menards Series: 0 ARCA Menards Series East: 0 NASCAR Canada Series: 2 IndyCar Series: 0 Asian Le Mans: 3
- Pole positions: Total: 3 NASCAR Cup Series: 0 NASCAR Xfinity Series: 0 NASCAR Camping World Truck Series: 0 ARCA Menards Series: 0 ARCA Menards Series East: 0 NASCAR Canada Series: 0 IndyCar Series: 1 Asian Le Mans: 2

Rick Ware Racing (RWR) is an American motorsports team which currently competes in the NASCAR Cup Series, NASCAR Canada Series, ARCA Menards Series, American Flat Track, and NHRA Mission Foods Drag Racing Series. The team has previously competed in the NASCAR Xfinity Series, NASCAR Camping World Truck Series, ARCA Menards Series East, NTT IndyCar Series, and Asian Le Mans.

== History ==
The organizational roots of RWR date back to Ware & Sons Racing with Rick and his father John Ware competing in the SCCA Series. They raced under the banner "Ware & Sons" as early as the 1960s when Rick went go-kart racing. Once of legal driving age, Rick joined his father John Ware in the SCCA and IMSA Series.

In 1983, Ware & Sons won Rookie of the Year in the California Sports Car Club with Rick behind the wheel. Ware & Sons with Rick as the driver went on to win several titles in that series, as well as the SCCA and IMSA Championship.

In 1998, Rick Ware attempted to qualify a Ware Racing Enterprises Ford in the Winston Cup event at Sonoma Raceway but failed to make the race. After a stint as a driver in the NASCAR Cup Series, Ware renamed the organization Ware Racing Enterprises in the 1990s and eventually Rick Ware Racing in 2004. Rick Ware Racing (RWR) had made a handful of attempts in the Cup Series beginning in 2004 with Stanton Barrett in the No. 52. In 2005, the organization made attempts with Larry Gunselman, José Luis Ramírez and Derrike Cope. In 2006, Larry Gunselman, Steve Portenga, and Stanton Barrett in the No. 52 and No. 30 respectively.

In 2011, Rick Ware Racing allied with the No. 37 Front Row Motorsports/Max Q Motorsports Team. American Le Mans Series driver Tomy Drissi qualified for the Sonoma Cup Race race, but NASCAR would not approve him for competition; Chris Cook drove the 37 to a 27th-place finish.

For 2012, Rick Ware Racing again allied with Max Q Motorsports to run Timmy Hill for the majority of the season in the No. 37 to vie for Rookie of the Year honors. After Mike Wallace failed to make Daytona, Hill DNQ'd the next race, but qualified in Vegas; he finished 42nd after a crash. When the team missed five races in six attempts, they were outside the top 35 and Ware moved Hill back to Nationwide, ending the partnership.

In 2017, RWR came back to the Cup Series with the No. 51 Chevrolet for most of the schedule. In 2018, the team ran with all three manufacturers and the team also secured a charter for the No. 51 car. Later in the season, the team fielded a part-time No. 52 car. For the 2019 season, RWR dropped Toyota to focus on running Chevrolets and Fords. The No. 51 team was registered as Petty Ware Racing after RWR leased the charter from Richard Petty Motorsports. In addition, RWR secured a full-time schedule for the No. 52 team after purchasing a charter from Front Row Motorsports, who had leased it to the now-defunct TriStar Motorsports. Starting with the 2019 Coca-Cola 600, RWR fielded multiple teams, the No. 53 and No. 54, on a part-time basis.

On November 27, 2019, NASCAR imposed penalties to Rick Ware Racing, Premium Motorsports, and Spire Motorsports for manipulating their finishing order at Homestead. Each team was docked 50 owners' points and fined US$50,000. In addition, competition directors Kenneth Evans of Rick Ware Racing and Scott Eggleston of Premium Motorsports were suspended indefinitely and fined US$25,000 each.

RWR took a lease of the former charter of Front Row Motorsports' No. 36 team, allowing the No. 53 to run a full-time schedule. On May 13, 2020, Fox Sports' Bob Pockrass confirmed that Rick Ware Racing had purchased Premium Motorsports and their charter for the No. 15 car from former owner Jay Robinson. RWR continued to run the No. 15 full-time for Brennan Poole under the Premium Motorsports name.

RWR entered in multiple series' inclusions the NTT IndyCar Series and the NASCAR Pinty's Series.

On April 9, 2023, RWR appointed Tommy Baldwin Jr. as competition director. Baldwin left in 2026.

On October 10, 2021, it was reported that RWR was going into an alliance with Stewart–Haas Racing and Roush Yates Engines beginning in 2022 as they would focus on running Fords. However beginning in 2023, RWR would switch their alliance to be with RFK Racing.

On April 1, 2025, Legacy Motor Club sued RWR over the sale of a charter. On March 3, both teams signed a deal for RWR to sell a charter to LMC, but RWR has allegedly backed out on the deal. RWR claims the agreement would go in effect in 2027, but LMC changed the terms to 2026 without any communication with RWR.

On April 9, LMC obtained a temporary restraining order preventing RWR from selling, leasing, or otherwise encumbering the charter in question for at least ten days or until agreement by LMC and RWR. However, a North Carolina judge denied LMC the injunction. It was revealed that the lawsuit resulted from a confusion over which of RWR's two charters was in the transaction. The agreement stated Charter 36 (currently used by the No. 51 car) was to be sold for US$45 million; LMC's attorney argued that the contract listed Charter 27 (which was leased to RFK Racing for the No. 60 car in 2025). RWR's attorney claimed that two weeks after the agreement was signed, LMC offered to pay RWR an additional US$5 million for Charter 27 for 2026. RFK has an agreement to lease Charter 36 in 2026, as teams are allowed to lease charters once every seven years.

On June 18, RWR filed a countersuit against LMC, citing LMC made a false claim of purchasing the charter for 2026.

On July 14, The courts granted LMC permission to depose RWR following the recent revelation that T.J. Puchyr intends to purchase the race team. On July 16, LMC filed a lawsuit against TJ Puchyr for tortious interference, alleging that he attempted to purchase RWR and violated the state's Unfair and Deceptive Trade Practices Act by using insider knowledge and a position of trust to interfere with Legacy's agreement with RWR.

On September 19, 2025, it was announced that LMC and RWR ended their lawsuit under a settlement, with RWR selling the charter to LMC; the rest of their settlement agreement is still unknown.

While the LMC lawsuit was going on, in June, it was announced that T. J. Puchyr, who co-founded Spire Motorsports in 2016, entered an agreement to purchase RWR's NASCAR team. The deal will retain Rick Ware as a partner and Cody Ware as the driver of the No. 51 car, as well as all of the current RWR employees. On July 31, a judge granted LMC a temporary restraining order against RWR, preventing RWR from closing the team's sale to Puchyr for ten days.

On September 10, 2026, it was announced that RWR would return to the NASCAR Canada Series.

The team's shop was previously located in Thomasville, North Carolina. In 2020, they moved to Mooresville, North Carolina during the two months (March to May) that the series could not race due to the beginning of the COVID-19 pandemic. RWR moved from Mooresville to a shop in Concord, North Carolina on the campus of RFK Racing, which the team began an alliance with in 2023.

== Cup Series ==
=== Car No. 01 history ===
On January 27, 2025, it was announced that Corey LaJoie would run a part-time schedule with Rick Ware Racing, driving the No. 01.

==== Car No. 01 results ====
Year	Driver	No.	Make	1	2	3	4	5	6	7	8	9	10	11	12	13	14	15	16	17	18	19	20	21	22	23	24	25	26	27	28	29	30	31	32	33	34	35	36	Owners	Pts
2025	Corey LaJoie	01	Ford	DAY; 22	ATL; 38	COA	PHO	LVS	HOM	MAR	DAR	BRI; 34	TAL	TEX	KAN	CLT	NSH	MCH	MXC	POC	ATL; 39	CSC	SON	DOV	IND	IOW	GLN	RCH	DAY	DAR	GTW	BRI	NHA	KAN	ROV	LVS	TAL	MAR	PHO	46th	25

=== Car No. 15 history ===
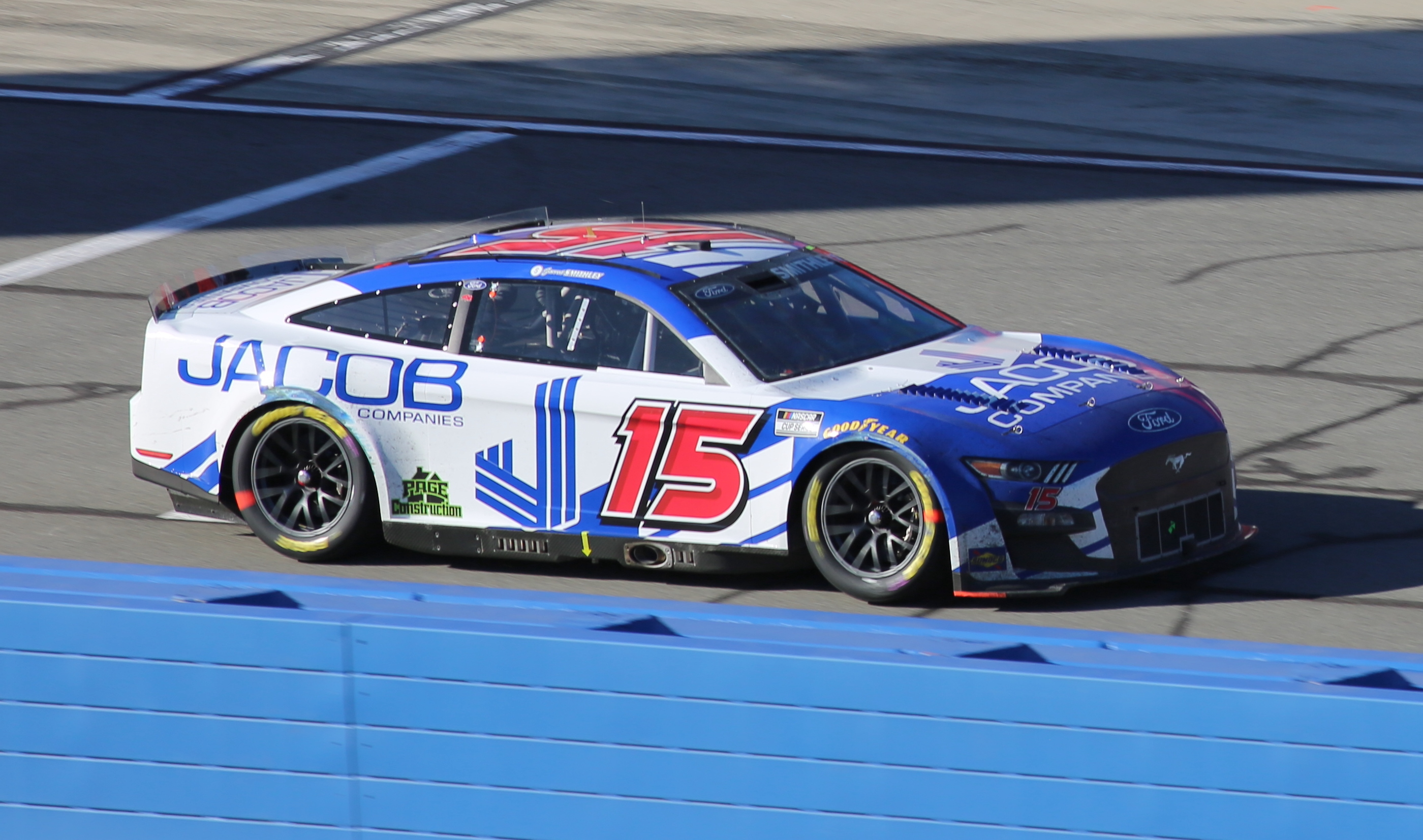
Garrett Smithley in the No. 15 at Auto Club in 2022

On May 13, 2020, Premium Motorsports was acquired by the organization and along with it, the team's charter for the No. 15, which was piloted by Brennan Poole. However, the 15 still ran under the Premium Motorsports banner. Poole ran all but one race (the Bristol Night Race, where he was replaced by J. J. Yeley) for the rest of the season. Following 2020, Poole left the team.

In 2021, the team would officially be run under the RWR banner. The team announced that 1990 Daytona 500 winner Derrike Cope would make his final career start in the Daytona 500 in the car. The car was also fielded in a collaboration with Cope's team, StarCom Racing. However, after qualifying, Cope was penalized for electrical issues and failing numerous inspections and his qualifying time was disallowed. Also during the duels, Cope had issues with the car, placing seventeenth in his duel race, only completing 59 laps out the 63. Cope started 32nd in the race and only ran three laps before crashing on lap four, ending his day. After the 500, the team used multiple drivers for the 15 team through the rest of the season. James Davison made the most starts for the team with seventeen starts, and gave the team's best finish with a 22nd-place finish in the Blue-Emu Maximum Pain Relief 500 at Martinsville. Dirt racer Chris Windom made his NASCAR Cup Series debut with the team at Bristol Dirt Race, driving the car. However, an engine failure caused Windom to drop out of the race and place the car 33rd. Later in April, Jennifer Jo Cobb was set to make her NASCAR Cup debut at the GEICO 500 at Talladega; however, NASCAR announced on April 19 that she would not be approved to run the race. This was likely due to how the race itself would have been her first time in a Cup car because of the lack of practice and qualifying. Joey Gase would drive the car at Las Vegas, Kansas, Nashville, and Daytona. At the fall Las Vegas race, Gase was involved in a scary crash when the car lost a tire and slammed the wall, sending the car airborne. Gase was transported to the hospital and released a few hours later. At the Go Bowling at The Glen, R. C. Enerson would make his NASCAR Cup debut for the team at the race. Enerson would drive the 15 to a 34th-place finish. Bayley Currey drove at Atlanta in July. Ryan Ellis drove at Kansas in October. He received the ride to make amends with the Ware family following a late wreck with Cody Ware during the Xfinity Race at Mid-Ohio. Josh Bilicki would drive the 15 at the Roval event while Joey Hand drove Bilicki's usual No. 52. Garrett Smithley would then finish out the year in the car. The team placed 35th in the owners points.

The No. 15 started the 2022 season with David Ragan, scoring an eighth-place finish at the 2022 Daytona 500, the team's highest finish since its acquisition from Premium Motorsports. The car was shared with Smithley, Hand, Yeley, Ryan Preece, and Parker Kligerman. At Michigan, Yeley triggered a massive pileup on lap 25 that took Austin Cindric and Kyle Busch out of contention.

The No. 15 started the 2023 season with Riley Herbst finishing 10th in the Daytona 500. The car was shared with J. J. Yeley, Todd Gilliland, Jenson Button, Brennan Poole, Gray Gaulding, Andy Lally, and Ryan Newman. At COTA, Button finished 18th in his NASCAR debut.

In 2024, Kaz Grala drove in 25 races starting at Atlanta. Cody Ware drove the No. 15 in nine races. Riley Herbst drove at the 2024 Daytona 500, as well as several other races. Following the end of the season, RWR leased out the No. 15's charter to RFK Racing for the No. 60 in 2025.

On December 17, 2024, it was announced that Tim Brown will run the No. 15 at the Clash at Bowman Gray Stadium in 2025. Brown had previously worked with the team as a suspension and drivetrain specialist.

==== Car No. 15 results ====
Year	Driver	No.	Make	1	2	3	4	5	6	7	8	9	10	11	12	13	14	15	16	17	18	19	20	21	22	23	24	25	26	27	28	29	30	31	32	33	34	35	36	Owners	Pts
2021	Derrike Cope	15	Chevy	DAY; 40																																				35th	210
2021	James Davison	15	Chevy		DAY; 23	HOM; 37		PHO; 33	ATL; 32		MAR; 22	RCH; 33			DAR; 31	DOV; 33	COA; 29	CLT; 33	SON; 25		POC; 28	POC; 30	ROA; 28		NHA; 36		IND; 32					BRI; 33								35th	210
2021	Joey Gase	15	Chevy				LVS; 34							KAN; 35						NSH; 29								MCH; 37		DAR; 29	RCH; 33		LVS; 37							35th	210
2021	Joey Gase	15	Ford																										DAY; 31											35th	210
2021	Chris Windom	15	Chevy							BRI; 33																														35th	210
2021	J. J. Yeley	15	Chevy										TAL; 26																											35th	210
2021	Bayley Currey	15	Chevy																					ATL; 32																35th	210
2021	R. C. Enerson	15	Chevy																							GLN; 34														35th	210
2021	Garrett Smithley	15	Chevy																															TAL; 29		TEX; 24		MAR; 33	PHO; 31	35th	210
2021	Josh Bilicki	15	Ford																																CLT; 28					35th	210
2021	Ryan Ellis	15	Chevy																																		KAN; 36			35th	210
2022	David Ragan	15	Ford	DAY; 8				ATL; 18					TAL; 24																DAY; 9											34th	345
2022	Garrett Smithley	15	Ford		CAL; 21	LVS; 30	PHO; 32															ATL; 27											TEX; 23						PHO; 33	34th	345
2022	Joey Hand	15	Ford						COA; 35										SON; 20		ROA; 21				IND; 29			GLN; 31							ROV; 38					34th	345
2022	J. J. Yeley	15	Ford							RCH; 33	MAR; 34	BRI; 30			DAR; 23	KAN; 31				NSH; 28			NHA; 29	POC; 28		MCH; 35	RCH; 32			DAR; 34	KAN; 28	BRI; 23		TAL; 31		LVS; 31	HOM; 32	MAR; 30		34th	345
2022	Ryan Preece	15	Ford											DOV; 25			CLT; 37																							34th	345
2022	Parker Kligerman	15	Ford															GTW; 31																						34th	345
2023	Riley Herbst	15	Ford	DAY; 10									TAL; 20																											34th	322
2023	J. J. Yeley	15	Ford		CAL; 23	LVS; 33		ATL; 26		RCH; 36	BRD; 20	MAR; 36					CLT; 16					ATL; 7		POC; 26	RCH; 35	MCH; 27				DAR; 30	KAN; 34	BRI; 26	TEX; 32				HOM; 33	MAR; 35	PHO; 27	34th	322
2023	Todd Gilliland	15	Ford				PHO; 32																																	34th	322
2023	Jenson Button	15	Ford						COA; 18												CSC; 21						IRC; 28													34th	322
2023	Brennan Poole	15	Ford											DOV; 33	KAN; 28	DAR; 36				NSH; 33									DAY; 39					TAL; 30		LVS; 29				34th	322
2023	Gray Gaulding	15	Ford															GTW; 29																						34th	322
2023	Andy Lally	15	Ford																SON; 35									GLN; 25							ROV; 35					34th	322
2023	Ryan Newman	15	Ford																				NHA; 30																	34th	322
2024	Riley Herbst	15	Ford	DAY; 24											KAN; 35							NSH; 37				RCH; 33														36th	371
2024	Kaz Grala	15	Ford		ATL; 14	LVS; 31	PHO; 30	BRI; 19	COA; 27	RCH; 31	MAR; 26	TEX; 27		DOV; 29		DAR; 18	CLT; 34		SON; 23	IOW; 33	NHA; 22		CSC; 26						DAR; 34		GLN; 35	BRI; 37	KAN; 31		ROV; 27		HOM; 32	MAR; 27	PHO; 34	36th	371
2024	Cody Ware	15	Ford										TAL; 24					GTW; 33						POC; 26	IND; 18		MCH; 21	DAY; 4		ATL; 30				TAL; 12		LVS; 21				36th	371

=== Car No. 30 history ===
In 2006, RWR fielded the No. 30 for Stanton Barrett at Sharpie 500. He failed to qualify for the race.

In 2007, Barrett attempted to make the Daytona 500 in the No. 30 only to miss the race by a single position.

==== Car No. 30 results ====
Year	Driver	No.	Make	1	2	3	4	5	6	7	8	9	10	11	12	13	14	15	16	17	18	19	20	21	22	23	24	25	26	27	28	29	30	31	32	33	34	35	36	Owners	Pts
2006	Stanton Barrett	30	Dodge	DAY	CAL	LVS	ATL	BRI	MAR	TEX	PHO	TAL	RCH	DAR	CLT	DOV	POC	MCH	SON	DAY	CHI	NHA	POC	IND	GLN	MCH	BRI; DNQ	CAL	RCH											67th	60
2006	Stanton Barrett	30	Chevy																											NHA; DNQ	DOV	KAN	TAL	CLT	MAR; DNQ	ATL	TEX	PHO	HOM	67th	60
2007	Stanton Barrett	30	Chevy	DAY; DNQ	CAL	LVS	ATL	BRI	MAR	TEX	PHO	TAL	RCH	DAR	CLT	DOV	POC	MCH	SON	NHA	DAY	CHI	IND	POC	GLN	MCH	BRI	CAL	RCH	NHA	DOV	KAN	TAL	CLT	MAR	ATL	TEX	PHO	HOM	66th	30

==== Car No. 37 history ====
In 2011, Rick Ware Racing allied with the No. 37 Front Row Motorsports/Max Q Motorsports Team. American Le Mans Series driver Tomy Drissi qualified for the Sonoma Cup Race race, but NASCAR would not approve him for competition; Chris Cook drove the 37 to a 27th-place finish.

For 2012, Rick Ware Racing again allied with Max Q Motorsports to run Timmy Hill for the majority of the season in the No. 37 for Rookie of the Year honors. After Mike Wallace failed to make Daytona, Hill DNQ'd the next race, but qualified in Vegas; he finished 42nd after a crash. When the team missed five races in six attempts, they were outside the top 35 and Ware moved Hill back to Nationwide, ending the partnership.

===== Car No. 37 results =====
Year	Driver	No.	Make	1	2	3	4	5	6	7	8	9	10	11	12	13	14	15	16	17	18	19	20	21	22	23	24	25	26	27	28	29	30	31	32	33	34	35	36	Owners	Pts
2012	Mike Wallace	37	Ford	DAY; DNQ																																				47th	30
2012	Timmy Hill	37	Ford		PHO; DNQ	LVS; 42	BRI; DNQ	CAL; DNQ																																47th	30
2012	Tony Raines	37	Ford						MAR; DNQ	TEX	KAN	RCH	TAL	DAR	CLT	DOV	POC	MCH	SON	KEN	DAY	NHA	IND	POC	GLN	MCH	BRI	ATL	RCH	CHI	NHA	DOV	TAL	CLT	KAN	MAR	TEX	PHO	HOM	47th	30

==== Car No. 51 history ====
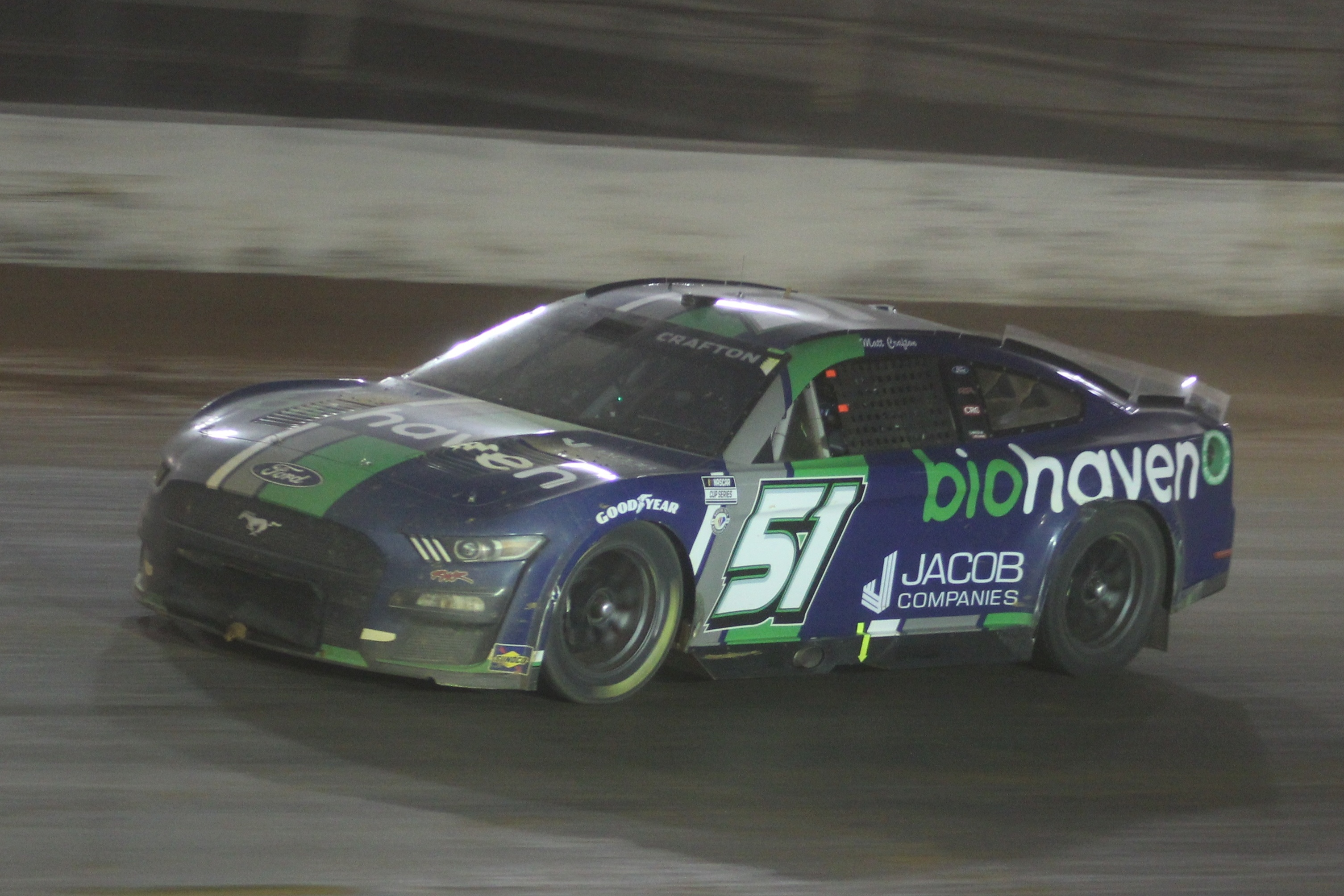
Matt Crafton in the No. 51 at Bristol Dirt in 2023

In 2017, Rick Ware Racing came back to the Cup Series with the No. 51 Chevrolet with plans to run the full schedule despite not having a charter. However things did not go according to the plan: Timmy Hill attempted the Daytona 500, but missed the field, the team then had Cody Ware make his debut at the next race in the Folds of Honor QuikTrip 500 at Atlanta, driving the No. 51 with sponsorship from Spoonful of Music and Bubba Burger. Ware qualified for the race as he started and finished 39th, retiring from the race on lap 74 with steering problems. Hill drove the car in the next seven races until RWR withdrew the 51 at Talladega. the 51 and Hill returned for the next two races at Kansas Speedway, and the Coke 600. Cody Ware returned and did both the Dover and Pocono, Ware's No. 51 acquired sponsorship from East Carolina University and Clemson University, respectively, with the latter also featuring logos celebrating the football team's 2017 College Football Playoff National Championship win earlier in the year. During the Dover race, Ware withdrew from the event after 283 of 406 laps after suffering from back pain. A week later at Pocono, he left the race after completing 35 laps, again for back problems. Ware was going to race at Michigan but he decided to stay out of the car for the race and the team did not find a replacement driver in time, forcing them to miss their third race of the year. Josh Bilicki joined the team for the race at Sonoma and New Hampshire, while Kyle Weatherman, B. J. McLeod and Ray Black Jr. joined the team for races in the mid-to-late portions of the season. By the end of the year, the team only participated in 29 of the 36 races that season.

On November 22, 2017, it was announced that Black would return to the 51 for a full 2018 season with a charter. The team did not disclose how they had acquired the charter. However, the deal with Black soon fell apart, leaving the 51 open for another driver. Justin Marks drove the No. 51 at the Daytona 500, finishing twelfth. The car was fielded in partnership with Premium Motorsports, powered by ECR Engines, and was sponsored by Harry's. Harrison Rhodes joined the team for a one-off the following week at Atlanta to make his Cup debut. A partnership with Stewart–Haas Racing brought Cole Custer to the car the following week at the spring Las Vegas race for his Cup debut. Timmy Hill was brought in for the next two races, finishing 33rd at both the spring Phoenix race and Fontana. Rhodes returned to the car for the next four races. Timmy Hill drove the car at the spring Talladega race. Cody Ware made his first start of the season at the spring Dover race. McLeod drove the car at the spring Kansas race and the 2018 Coca-Cola 600. Custer returned to the No. 51 at the Pocono 400 Chris Cook drove the No. 51 at Sonoma. Jeb Burton drove the No. 51 at the fall Martinsville race.

For the 2019 season, The No. 51 team was registered as Petty Ware Racing after RWR leased the charter from Richard Petty Motorsports. At the 2019 Daytona 500, both RWR cars triggered an unusual crash on lap 159. As several cars were entering pit road, Cody Ware and McLeod collided, sending McLeod to the infield grass and Ware slamming into Tyler Reddick, who inflicted serious damage on Jimmie Johnson's left rear quarter panel. Ware then hit Ricky Stenhouse Jr. from behind before resting on the infield grass, causing Stenhouse to collide with Reddick. McLeod, who drove the 51, finished the race 19th. Andy Seuss joined the team for his Cup debut at New Hampshire Motor Speedway in July.

For the 2020 season, Joey Gase became the primary driver while Garrett Smithley drove the car at three races, James Davison doing four races, and Bilicki returned for the Charlotte Roval. The team finished the season 38th in the points standings.

For the 2021 season, Cody Ware returned as the primary driver for the No. 51 Nurtec ODT Chevrolet. Smithley returned for two races while J. J. Yeley ran two races and Davison returned for Watkins Glen. The No. 51 finished the season 34th in points. On December 1, RWR lost its lease to the No. 51's charter after GMS Racing purchased a majority stake in Richard Petty Motorsports. The charter was transferred to Petty GMS Motorsports' No. 42 car.

Cody Ware returned to the No. 51 for the 2022 season, using the former No. 52's charter. He scored a career-best 17th-place finish at the 2022 Daytona 500. At Sonoma, the No. 51 failed pre-race inspection four times and was hit with an L1 penalty, resulting in a start at the back of the field and a pass-through penalty on the first lap. In addition, the team was deducted 20 owner and driver points. On August 23, crew chief Billy Plourde was suspended for four races after the No. 51 lost a ballast during the Watkins Glen race. At Texas, Ware survived a hard crash, colliding with the turn 4 wall before violently hitting the pit wall. He sustained an impaction fracture on his ankle from the crash. Ware missed the Charlotte Roval race due to his injury, with J. J. Yeley substituting him in the No. 51.

Ware started the 2023 season with a fourteenth-place finish at the 2023 Daytona 500. On April 10, Ware was indefinitely suspended by NASCAR after being arrested and charged with a felony assault by strangulation as well as a misdemeanor assault on a woman in Iredell County, North Carolina. Matt Crafton replaced Ware for the Bristol Dirt Race (at the time of the change, Ware's arrest had not yet been revealed), with the team using variety of drivers following the race, beginning from Zane Smith for Martinsville, Yeley for Talladega, Todd Gilliland for Charlotte and Sonoma, Ryan Newman for the All-Star Race and the championship race, Andy Lally for the Chicago street race, and Cole Custer for Atlanta, New Hampshire, and Pocono. Despite the team finishing in the bottom three among the 36 chartered teams on the owner standings for the past three consecutive years, NASCAR decided not to repossess the No. 51's charter at the end of the season.

In 2024, Justin Haley drove the No. 51 full-time in a multi-year deal. At the Circuit of the Americas, he finished seventeenth, but was later disqualified after post-race inspection revealed his car did not meet the minimum weight requirement. During the season, Haley scored two ninth-place finishes at Darlington and Gateway. On September 20, RWR and Spire Motorsports made a driver swap for the remainder of the 2024 season, with Haley moving to the Spire No. 7 and Corey LaJoie taking over the No. 51.

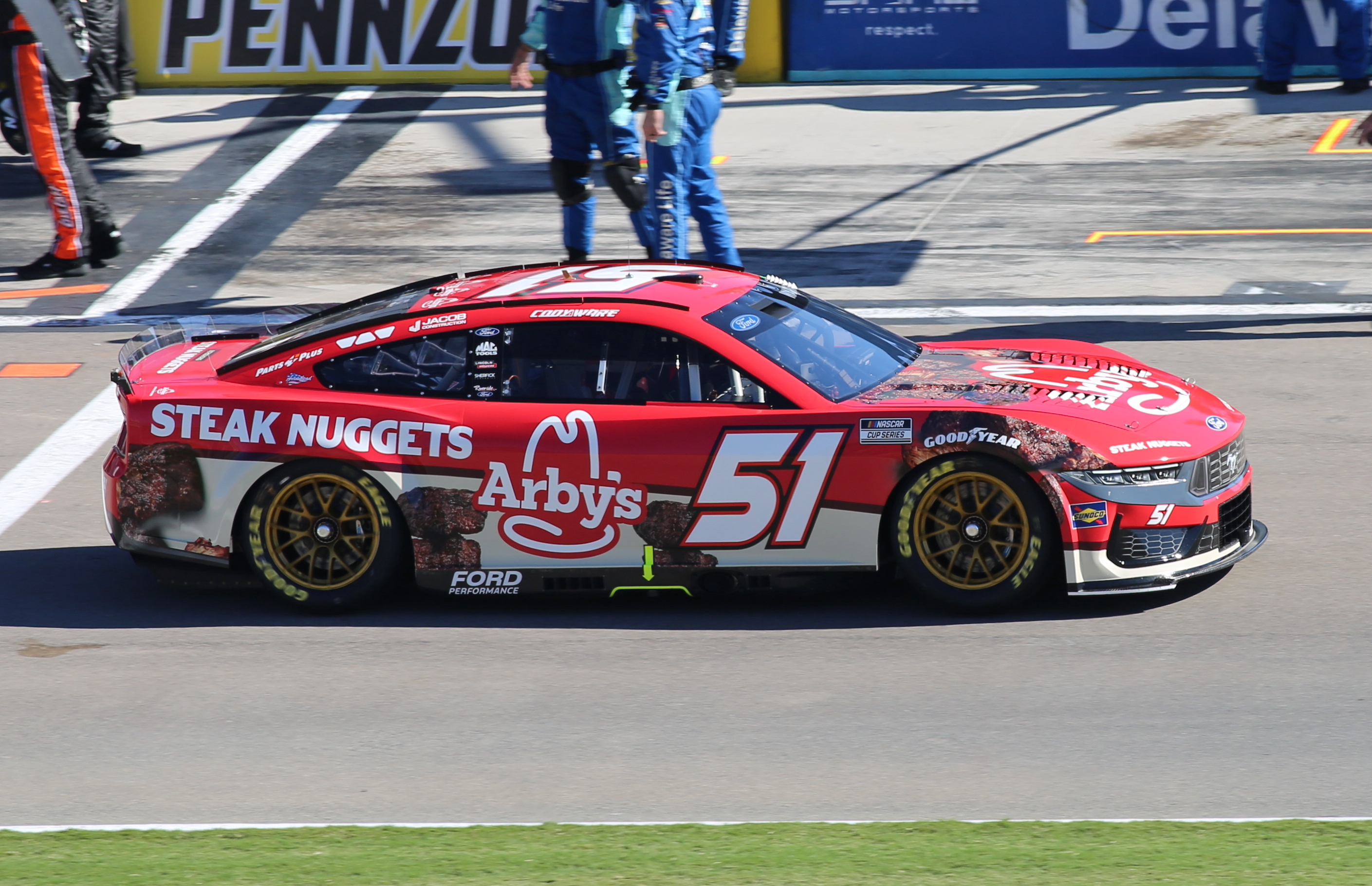
Cody Ware in the No. 51 at Las Vegas Motor Speedway in 2025

Cody Ware returned to the No. 51 car full-time in 2025. After finishing 25th at the 2025 Daytona 500, the No. 51 team was docked ten driver and owner points for improperly securing the car's ballasts. On February 20, Arby's signed a deal to sponsor the No. 51 car for twelve races. Harrison Burton drove the No. 51 car at the 2025 NASCAR All-Star Race, as his win with Wood Brothers Racing at the 2024 Daytona summer race qualified him for the exhibition race. Burton finished 20th out of 23 participants.

For the 2026 season, RWR switched from Ford to Chevrolet, forming a team alliance with Richard Childress Racing.

==== Car No. 51 results ====
Year	Driver	No.	Make	1	2	3	4	5	6	7	8	9	10	11	12	13	14	15	16	17	18	19	20	21	22	23	24	25	26	27	28	29	30	31	32	33	34	35	36	Owners	Pts
2002	Carl Long	51	Dodge	DAY	CAR	LVS	ATL	DAR	BRI	TEX	MAR	TAL	CAL	RCH	CLT	DOV	POC	MCH	SON	DAY	CHI	NHA	POC	IND	GLN	MCH	BRI; DNQ	DAR; DNQ	RCH; DNQ	NHA; DNQ		KAN; DNQ								54th	227
2002	Morgan Shepherd	51	Dodge																												DOV; DNQ		TAL; DNQ	CLT						54th	227
2002	Brian Rose	51	Dodge																																MAR; DNQ	ATL	CAR			54th	227
2002	Jerry Robertson	51	Dodge																																			PHO; DNQ	HOM	54th	227
2017	Timmy Hill	51	Chevy	DAY; DNQ		LVS; 37	PHO; 32	CAL; 35	MAR; 33	TEX; 39	BRI; 37	RCH; 34	TAL; Wth	KAN; 28	CLT; 29																									41st	82
2017	Cody Ware	51	Chevy		ATL; 39											DOV; 35	POC; 39	MCH										DAR; 37			NHA; 39									41st	82
2017	Josh Bilicki	51	Chevy																SON; 36	DAY		NHA; 36																		41st	82
2017	B. J. McLeod	51	Chevy																		KEN; 32		IND; 32	POC	GLN	MCH; 36	BRI; 32		RCH; 37			DOV; 36	CLT; 32	TAL	KAN; 30					41st	82
2017	Ray Black Jr.	51	Chevy																											CHI; 40							TEX; 34		HOM; 38	41st	82
2017	Kyle Weatherman	51	Chevy																																	MAR; 35		PHO; 34		41st	82
2018	Justin Marks	51	Chevy	DAY; 12																																				36th	188
2018	Harrison Rhodes	51	Chevy		ATL; 33				MAR; 35	TEX; 22		RCH; 36																												36th	188
2018	Harrison Rhodes	51	Toyota								BRI; 37																													36th	188
2018	Cole Custer	51	Ford			LVS; 25											POC; 26														RCH; 26									36th	188
2018	Timmy Hill	51	Chevy				PHO; 33						TAL; 36																											36th	188
2018	Timmy Hill	51	Toyota					CAL; 33																																36th	188
2018	Cody Ware	51	Chevy											DOV; 36																				TAL; 38				PHO; 28		36th	188
2018	B. J. McLeod	51	Chevy												KAN; 35	CLT; 33		MCH; 37		CHI; 35		KEN; 32	NHA; 34	POC; 40				DAR; 32							KAN; 33					36th	188
2018	B. J. McLeod	51	Ford																							MCH; 31				LVS; 28			DOV; 34						HOM; 35	36th	188
2018	Chris Cook	51	Ford																SON; 31																					36th	188
2018	Ray Black Jr.	51	Chevy																		DAY; 16																			36th	188
2018	Josh Bilicki	51	Ford																						GLN; 36															36th	188
2018	Reed Sorenson	51	Chevy																								BRI; 33													36th	188
2018	David Starr	51	Chevy																										IND; 39											36th	188
2018	Stanton Barrett	51	Ford																													CLT; 40								36th	188
2018	Jeb Burton	51	Chevy																																	MAR; 33				36th	188
2018	Joey Gase	51	Ford																																		TEX; 37			36th	188
2019	B. J. McLeod	51	Chevy	DAY; 19						TEX; 31																	BRI; 32	DAR; 39					DOV; 29			MAR; 27				34th	190
2019	B. J. McLeod	51	Ford																	CHI; 36	DAY; 28			POC; 33					IND; 25	LVS; 33										34th	190
2019	Cody Ware	51	Ford		ATL; 33								TAL; 28	DOV; 34		CLT; 38										MCH; 36														34th	190
2019	Cody Ware	51	Chevy			LVS; 35	PHO; 32	CAL; 32	MAR; 36						KAN; 40										GLN; 33															34th	190
2019	Gray Gaulding	51	Ford								BRI; 36																													34th	190
2019	Jeb Burton	51	Ford									RCH; 31																												34th	190
2019	Bayley Currey	51	Ford														POC; 25					KEN; 33																		34th	190
2019	Kyle Weatherman	51	Ford															MCH; 36																						34th	190
2019	J. J. Yeley	51	Chevy																SON; 38													CLT; 29								34th	190
2019	J. J. Yeley	51	Ford																																KAN; 30				HOM; 30	34th	190
2019	Andy Seuss	51	Ford																				NHA; 28																	34th	190
2019	Austin Theriault	51	Chevy																												RCH; 32									34th	190
2019	Austin Theriault	51	Ford																															TAL; 35						34th	190
2019	Josh Bilicki	51	Chevy																																		TEX; 30			34th	190
2019	Garrett Smithley	51	Chevy																																			PHO; 31		34th	190
2020	Joey Gase	51	Chevy	DAY; 23								BRI; 33		MAR; 35																										38th	133
2020	Joey Gase	51	Ford					DAR; 30	DAR; 29	CLT; 36	CLT; 39		ATL; 38		HOM; 36	TAL; 37	POC; 37	POC; 33	IND; 26	KEN; 34	TEX; 32	KAN; 29	NHA; 34				DOV; 35	DOV; 40		DAR; 33	RCH; 35	BRI; 31	LVS; 35	TAL; 17		KAN; 37	TEX; 37	MAR; 34	PHO; 32	38th	133
2020	Garrett Smithley	51	Chevy		LVS; 35	CAL; 34	PHO; 35																																	38th	133
2020	James Davison	51	Ford																					MCH; 38	MCH; 37				DAY; 39											38th	133
2020	James Davison	51	Chevy																							DAY; 30														38th	133
2020	Josh Bilicki	51	Ford																																	CLT; 33				38th	133
2021	Cody Ware	51	Chevy	DAY; 21	DAY; 25	HOM; 32	LVS; 32	PHO; 36	ATL; 31	BRI; 32	MAR; 28	RCH; 36	TAL; 28	KAN; 36	DAR; 34	DOV; 31	COA; 32		SON; 34		POC; 25	POC; 28	ROA; 31	ATL; 33	NHA; 31		IND; 40	MCH; 27	DAY; 28	DAR; 33			LVS; 31	TAL; 28	CLT; 36	TEX; 38	KAN; 31	MAR; 30	PHO; 28	34th	217
2021	Garrett Smithley	51	Chevy															CLT; 34													RCH; 31									34th	217
2021	J. J. Yeley	51	Chevy																	NSH; 27												BRI; 27								34th	217
2021	James Davison	51	Ford																							GLN; 37														34th	217
2022	Cody Ware	51	Ford	DAY; 17	CAL; 32	LVS; 26	PHO; 31	ATL; 26	COA; 27	RCH; 36	MAR; 33	BRI; 26	TAL; 28	DOV; 34	DAR; 19	KAN; 34	CLT; 18	GTW; 35	SON; 32	NSH; 27	ROA; 32	ATL; 23	NHA; 30	POC; 26	IND; 24	MCH; 22	RCH; 34	GLN; 34	DAY; 6	DAR; 32	KAN; 27	BRI; 17	TEX; 33	TAL; 32		LVS; 27	HOM; 32	MAR; 28	PHO; 30	35th	310
2022	J. J. Yeley	51	Ford																																ROV; 32					35th	310
2023	Cody Ware	51	Ford	DAY; 14	CAL; 27	LVS; 35	PHO; 34	ATL; 25	COA; 25	RCH; 34																														35th	322
2023	Matt Crafton	51	Ford								BRD; 34																													35th	322
2023	Zane Smith	51	Ford									MAR; 34																												35th	322
2023	J. J. Yeley	51	Ford										TAL; 11	DOV; 28	KAN; 23			GTW; 24		NSH; 29									DAY; 19					TAL; 36		LVS; 28				35th	322
2023	Ryan Newman	51	Ford													DAR; 28									RCH; 29					DAR; 27		BRI; 36					HOM; 26	MAR; 29	PHO; 34	35th	322
2023	Todd Gilliland	51	Ford														CLT; 33		SON; 24														TEX; 35		ROV; 23					35th	322
2023	Andy Lally	51	Ford																		CSC; 26						IRC; 30													35th	322
2023	Cole Custer	51	Ford																			ATL; 32	NHA; 35	POC; 25		MCH; 25		GLN; 28			KAN; 24									35th	322
2024	Justin Haley	51	Ford	DAY; 26	ATL; 20	LVS; 27	PHO; 24	BRI; 17	COA; 39	RCH; 32	MAR; 30	TEX; 24	TAL; 34	DOV; 23	KAN; 18	DAR; 9	CLT; 22	GTW; 9	SON; 33	IOW; 13	NHA; 29	NSH; 13	CSC; 16	POC; 22	IND; 20	RCH; 27	MCH; 20	DAY; 32	DAR; 27	ATL; 12	GLN; 29	BRI; 22								34th	488
2024	Corey LaJoie	51	Ford																														KAN; 15	TAL; 18	ROV; 37	LVS; 14	HOM; 35	MAR; 35	PHO; 32	34th	488
2025	Cody Ware	51	Ford	DAY; 25	ATL; 35	COA; 31	PHO; 24	LVS; 36	HOM; 34	MAR; 30	DAR; 27	BRI; 36	TAL; 31	TEX; 30	KAN; 30	CLT; 25	NSH; 33	MCH; 26	MXC; 31	POC; 29	ATL; 13	CSC; 26	SON; 34	DOV; 36	IND; 37	IOW; 32	GLN; 29	RCH; 32	DAY; 20	DAR; 37	GTW; 29	BRI; 29	NHA; 31	KAN; 37	ROV; 33	LVS; 35	TAL; 31	MAR; 32	PHO; 30	36th	233
2026	Cody Ware	51	Chevy	DAY; 17	ATL; 27	COA; 30	PHO; 24	LVS; 35	DAR; 36	MAR; 32	BRI; 31	KAN; 37	TAL; 21	TEX; 30	GLN; 37	CLT; 28	NSH; 22	MCH; 23	POC; 30	COR; 23	SON; 33	CHI; 30	ATL; 32	NWS; 29	IND; 31	IOW; 32	RCH; 34	NHA; 29	DAY; 35	DAR; 36	GTW; 22	BRI; 31	KAN; 34	LVS; 34	CLT; 31	PHO; 35	TAL; 16	MAR; 33	HOM; 35	37th	264

=== Car No. 52 history ===
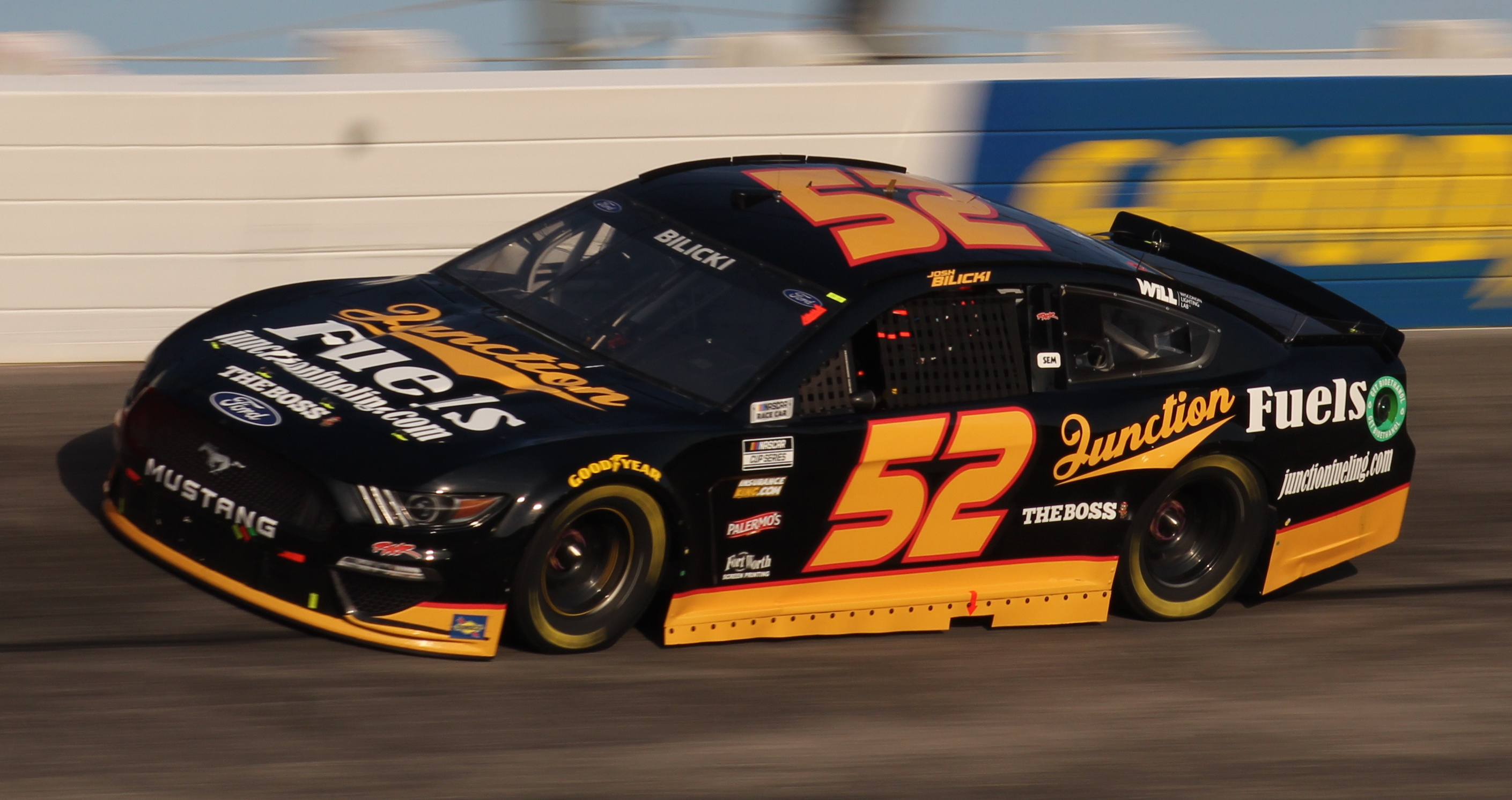
Josh Bilicki in the No. 52 at Darlington Raceway in 2021

In 2004, RWR fielded the No. 52 with Stanton Barrett as the driver.

In 2005, the organization made attempts with Larry Gunselman, José Luis Ramírez and Derrike Cope.

In 2006, Larry Gunselman, Steve Portenga, Donnie Neuenberger and Stanton Barrett in the No. 52.

In 2018, RWR fielded the No. 52 on a partial schedule. The No. 52 car was set to make its debut at the Coca-Cola 600 with B. J. McLeod behind the wheel as Cody Ware was to drive the 51; however, the entry was withdrawn and McLeod was moved to the No. 51 car. The No. 52 instead made its debut with Cody Ware at Sonoma. J. J. Yeley, Gray Gaulding and Harrison Rhodes also drove the 52. At season's end, the No. 52 did a total of six starts in the season with five different drivers, with its best finish being 30th at Indianapolis.

In 2019, RWR secured a full-time schedule for the No. 52 team after purchasing a charter from Front Row Motorsports, who had leased it to the now-defunct TriStar Motorsports. At the 2019 Daytona 500, both RWR cars triggered an unusual crash on lap 159. As several cars were entering pit road, Cody Ware and McLeod collided, sending McLeod to the infield grass and Ware slamming into Tyler Reddick, who inflicted serious damage on Jimmie Johnson's left rear quarter panel. Ware then hit Ricky Stenhouse Jr. from behind before resting on the infield grass, causing Stenhouse to collide with Reddick. Ware, who drove the 52, finished 39th. Prior to the Atlanta race, car chief Mike Chance was ejected from the track after the No. 52 failed pre-qualifying inspection multiple times. During the race, McLeod was involved in his second consecutive pit road incident when he pulled towards his pit stall and Ryan Preece slammed into the back of his car. McLeod's car then slammed into Chris Buescher's pit box and hit fueler Anthony Pasut, who suffered a broken fibula, a torn ACL, and other injuries to his right leg. The collision put Preece's car out of commission with a 35th-place finish while McLeod and Ware finished 32nd and 33rd, respectively. In March, Bayley Currey made his Cup debut in the No. 52 at Phoenix. On August 15, 2019, Currey was indefinitely suspended for violating NASCAR's Substance Abuse Policy. On September 18, Currey was reinstated by NASCAR after he successfully completed his Road to Recovery Program. Prior to the Talladega race, the No. 52's hauler caught fire at the garage due to an electrical short. The No. 52 finished 38th in the points standings.

In 2020, the No. 52 ran the first four races of the season with McLeod doing the 500 and Yeley running the following three races. However, after the organization purchased Premium Motorsports, the No. 52 switched the number to Premium's No. 27, owing to sponsorship considerations. Yeley did the most starts in the 27 in 2020 with 24 starts; his best finish was 21st at Indianapolis. Gaulding did nine starts with his best finish being 25th at Texas) while Josh Bilicki and Cody Ware did the remaining two starts. Bilicki drove the 27 at Atlanta where he finished 34th. Cody Ware participated at the Talladega fall race. Towards the end of the race, due to a lot of front runners being involved in crashes, Ware was racing in the top ten until he crashed on the backstretch on the final lap, but was able to finish nineteenth for his first Cup Series top-twenty. The No. 52 finished 33rd in the points standings.

In 2021, the 27 would revert into the 52 with Bilicki as the full-time driver. At the Daytona night race, Bilicki scored both his and the 52's first top-ten by finishing tenth in the race. That same year, Joey Hand made his debut at the Charlotte Roval. Just like the previous season, the No. 52 finished 33rd in the points standings. At the end the 2021 season, the charter for the No. 52 was moved to the No. 51 car and the team was shut down.

==== Car No. 52 results ====
Year	Driver	No.	Make	1	2	3	4	5	6	7	8	9	10	11	12	13	14	15	16	17	18	19	20	21	22	23	24	25	26	27	28	29	30	31	32	33	34	35	36	Owners	Pts
2004	Stanton Barrett	52	Dodge	DAY	CAR	LVS	ATL	DAR	BRI	TEX	MAR	TAL	CAL	RCH	CLT	DOV	POC	MCH	SON	DAY	CHI	NHA	POC	IND	GLN; DNQ	MCH	BRI; DNQ	CAL	RCH	NHA	DOV	TAL	KAN	CLT	MAR	ATL	PHO	DAR	HOM	71st	50
2005	Larry Gunselman	52	Ford	DAY; DNQ	CAL	LVS	ATL	BRI	MAR	TEX	PHO	TAL	DAR	RCH	CLT	DOV	POC	MCH																						67th	85
2005	José Luis Ramírez	52	Dodge																SON; DNQ	DAY	CHI																			67th	85
2005	Derrike Cope	52	Dodge																			NHA; DNQ	POC; DNQ	IND	GLN	MCH	BRI	CAL	RCH	NHA	DOV	TAL	KAN	CLT	MAR	ATL	TEX	PHO	HOM	67th	85
2006	Larry Gunselman	52	Dodge	DAY; DNQ	CAL	LVS	ATL	BRI	MAR	TEX																														63rd	104
2006	Steve Portenga	52	Dodge								PHO; DNQ	TAL	RCH	DAR	CLT																									63rd	104
2006	Donnie Neuenberger	52	Dodge													DOV; DNQ	POC	MCH	SON	DAY	CHI	NHA									DOV; DNQ	KAN	TAL	CLT	MAR	ATL	TEX	PHO	HOM	63rd	104
2006	Stanton Barrett	52	Dodge																				POC; DNQ	IND	GLN	MCH	BRI	CAL	RCH	NHA										63rd	104
2018	B. J. McLeod	52	Chevy	DAY	ATL	LVS	PHO	CAL	MAR	TEX	BRI	RCH	TAL	DOV	KAN	CLT; Wth	POC	MCH																						45th	16
2018	B. J. McLeod	52	Ford																								BRI; DNQ		IND; 30	LVS										45th	16
2018	Cody Ware	52	Chevy																SON; 36	CHI	DAY	KEN	NHA	POC	GLN	MCH														45th	16
2018	J. J. Yeley	52	Chevy																									DAR; 31												45th	16
2018	Gray Gaulding	52	Ford																												RCH; 40	CLT								45th	16
2018	Harrison Rhodes	52	Chevy																														DOV; 38	TAL	KAN	MAR	TEX	PHO	HOM	45th	16
2019	Cody Ware	52	Chevy	DAY; 39															SON; 36																					38th	90
2019	B. J. McLeod	52	Chevy		ATL; 32									DOV; 37								KEN; 36																		38th	90
2019	B. J. McLeod	52	Ford			LVS; 37		CAL; 37																																38th	90
2019	Bayley Currey	52	Ford				PHO; 31								KAN; 33	CLT; 35				CHI; 32																				38th	90
2019	Bayley Currey	52	Chevy							TEX; 35	BRI; 31	RCH; 32																										PHO; 32		38th	90
2019	Jeb Burton	52	Chevy						MAR; 35																															38th	90
2019	Stanton Barrett	52	Chevy										TAL; 35																											38th	90
2019	J. J. Yeley	52	Chevy														POC; 34											DAR; 32												38th	90
2019	J. J. Yeley	52	Ford																		DAY; 12										RCH; 33		DOV; 32							38th	90
2019	Josh Bilicki	52	Chevy															MCH; 33							GLN; 32															38th	90
2019	Josh Bilicki	52	Ford																																				HOM; 36	38th	90
2019	Austin Theriault	52	Chevy																				NHA; 35																	38th	90
2019	Austin Theriault	52	Ford																					POC; 34		MCH; 32														38th	90
2019	Kyle Weatherman	52	Chevy																								BRI; 31													38th	90
2019	Garrett Smithley	52	Ford																										IND; 28	LVS; 35		CLT; 36			KAN; 34		TEX; 36			38th	90
2019	Garrett Smithley	52	Chevy																																	MAR; 32				38th	90
2019	Spencer Boyd	52	Chevy																															TAL; 40						38th	90
2020	B. J. McLeod	52	Ford	DAY; 38																																				33rd	257
2020	J. J. Yeley	52	Ford		LVS; 28	CAL; 31	PHO; 26																																	33rd	257
2020	J. J. Yeley	27	Ford					DAR; 28						MAR; 31	HOM; 38		POC; 31	POC; 28	IND; 21	KEN; 30		KAN; 22	NHA; 29	MCH; 26	MCH; 29	DAY; 34	DOV; 31	DOV; 38		DAR; 30	RCH; 34							MAR; 31		33rd	257
2020	J. J. Yeley	27	Chevy																										DAY; 40							KAN; 30	TEX; 40		PHO; 30	33rd	257
2020	Gray Gaulding	27	Ford						DAR; 32	CLT; 31	CLT; 30	BRI; 30				TAL; 30					TEX; 25											BRI; 27	LVS; 31		CLT; 26					33rd	257
2020	Josh Bilicki	27	Ford										ATL; 34																											33rd	257
2020	Cody Ware	27	Chevy																															TAL; 19						33rd	257
2021	Josh Bilicki	52	Ford	DAY; 24	DAY; 36	HOM; 33	LVS; 35	PHO; 35	ATL; 37	BRI; 30	MAR; 23	RCH; 37	TAL; 36	KAN; 39	DAR; 33	DOV; 34	COA; 30	CLT; 35	SON; 29	NSH; 26	POC; 34	POC; 35	ROA; 23	ATL; 34	NHA; 34	GLN; 33	IND; 18	MCH; 31	DAY; 10	DAR; 28	RCH; 36	BRI; 31	LVS; 36	TAL; 31		TEX; 26	KAN; 33	MAR; 35	PHO; 30	33rd	220
2021	Joey Hand	52	Ford																																CLT; 27					33rd	220

=== Car No. 53 history ===
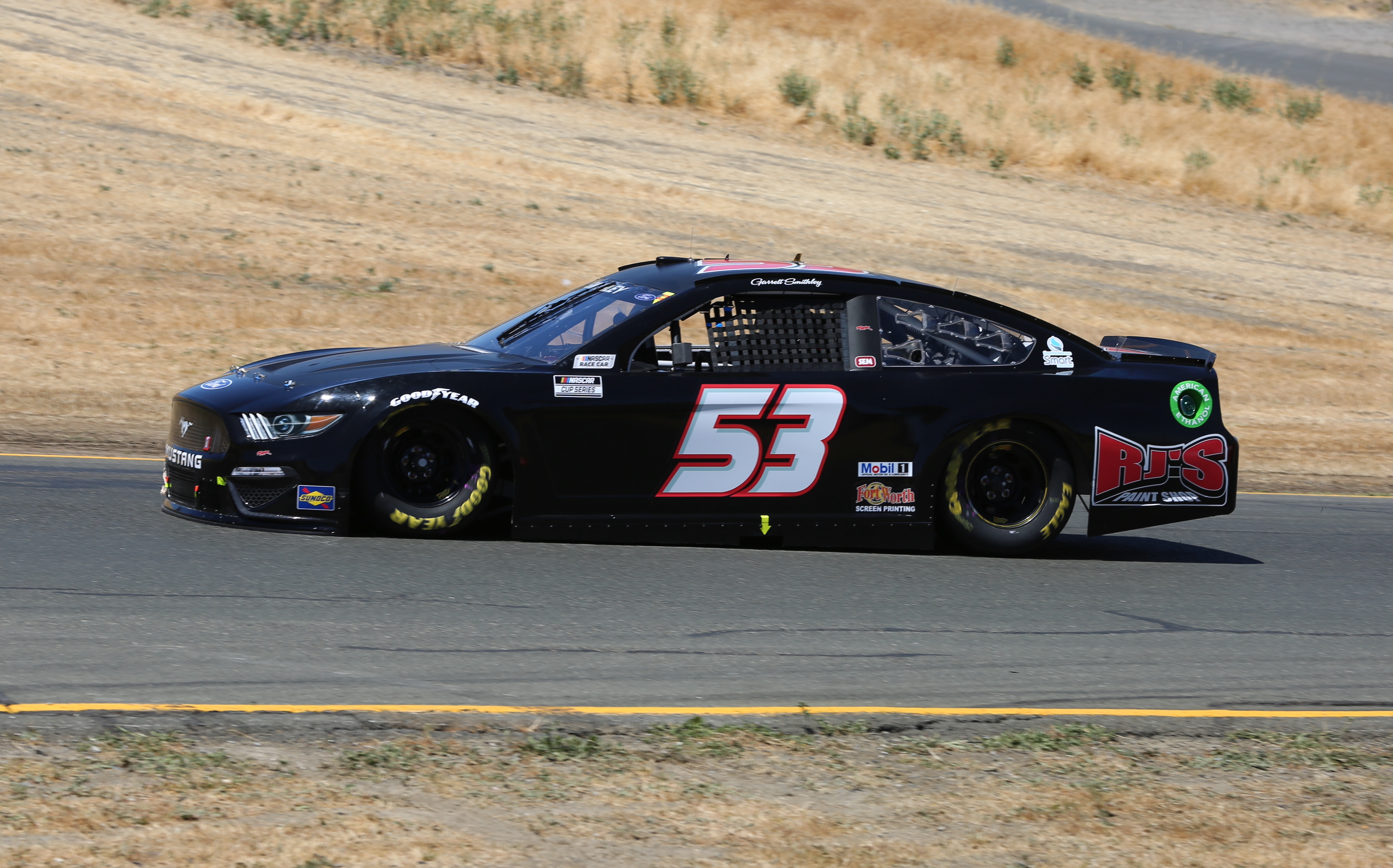
Garrett Smithley in the No. 53 at Sonoma Raceway in 2021

In 2019, RWR fielded a third team, the No. 53, on a part-time basis. The No. 53 made its debut at the 2019 Coca-Cola 600 with B. J. McLeod. Other drivers such as Josh Bilicki, Joey Gase, Spencer Boyd, and J. J. Yeley also drove the car. The No. 53 finished the season 39th in the points standings.

In 2020, RWR took lease of the former charter of Front Row Motorsports' No. 36 team, allowing the No. 53 to run a full-time schedule. The No. 53 car was renumbered to the No. 36 for the 2020 Daytona 500 with David Ragan as the driver. Front Row Motorsports prepared the car. The No. 53 finished the season 36th in points.

In 2021, The 53 car was returned to full-time competition with Garrett Smithley as the primary driver. However, during the spring Talladega weekend, The No. 53 was switched to No. 28 and ran as a tribute to Davey Allison with Gase as the driver. Just like the previous season, the No. 53 finished the season 36th in the points standings. At the end of the season, the No. 53 team was shut down and its charter was sold to Spire Motorsports for the No. 7 driven by Corey LaJoie.

==== Car No. 53 results ====
Year	Driver	No.	Make	1	2	3	4	5	6	7	8	9	10	11	12	13	14	15	16	17	18	19	20	21	22	23	24	25	26	27	28	29	30	31	32	33	34	35	36	Owners	Pts
2019	B. J. McLeod	53	Chevy	DAY	ATL	LVS	PHO	CAL	MAR	TEX	BRI	RCH	TAL	DOV	KAN	CLT; 29	POC	MCH	SON																				HOM; 32	39th	78
2019	Josh Bilicki	53	Chevy																	CHI; 33				POC; 35	GLN		BRI; 35	DAR				CLT; 38	DOV	TAL						39th	78
2019	Josh Bilicki	53	Ford																										IND; 29						KAN; 36					39th	78
2019	Joey Gase	53	Chevy																		DAY; 27	KEN	NHA																	39th	78
2019	Spencer Boyd	53	Ford																							MCH; 38														39th	78
2019	Spencer Boyd	53	Chevy																												RCH; 34									39th	78
2019	J. J. Yeley	53	Ford																											LVS; 32							TEX; 26	PHO; 29		39th	78
2019	J. J. Yeley	53	Chevy																																	MAR; 28				39th	78
2020	David Ragan	36	Ford	DAY; 4																																				36th	179
2020	Joey Gase	53	Ford		LVS; 31	CAL; 33																							DAY; 31											36th	179
2020	Joey Gase	53	Chevy				PHO; 29																																	36th	179
2020	Garrett Smithley	53	Chevy					DAR; 37	DAR; 34	CLT; 33	CLT; 40		ATL; 35				POC; 33	POC; 32	IND; 24	KEN; 33																				36th	179
2020	Garrett Smithley	53	Ford																					MCH; 35	MCH; 34	DAY; 36											TEX; 31			36th	179
2020	Bayley Currey	53	Chevy									BRI; 38																												36th	179
2020	David Starr	53	Chevy											MAR; 32																										36th	179
2020	Josh Bilicki	53	Chevy												HOM; 37						TEX; 31	KAN; 25					DOV; 32	DOV; 32												36th	179
2020	Josh Bilicki	53	Ford																														LVS; 36							36th	179
2020	J. J. Yeley	53	Chevy													TAL; 36																								36th	179
2020	James Davison	53	Chevy																				NHA; 30							DAR; 39	RCH; 37	BRI; 35		TAL; 30	CLT; 29					36th	179
2020	James Davison	53	Ford																																	KAN; 32		MAR; 36	PHO; 33	36th	179
2021	Joey Gase	53	Ford	DAY; 20																														TAL; 25						36th	205
2021	Joey Gase	53	Chevy						ATL; 35																											TEX; 39	KAN; 32	MAR; 38	PHO; 29	36th	205
2021	Joey Gase	28	Ford										TAL; 34																											36th	205
2021	Garrett Smithley	53	Chevy		DAY; 27	HOM; 31	LVS; 31	PHO; 34				RCH; 35		KAN; 33		DOV; 32				NSH; 25	POC; 29	POC; 36		ATL; 31	NHA; 33			MCH; 32	DAY; 30			BRI; 30	LVS; 35		CLT; 34					36th	205
2021	Garrett Smithley	53	Ford														COA; 28		SON; 32							GLN; 36	IND; 28													36th	205
2021	J. J. Yeley	53	Chevy							BRI; 28	MAR; 25				DAR; 29																RCH; 34									36th	205
2021	Cody Ware	53	Chevy															CLT; 30																						36th	205
2021	Ryan Eversley	53	Ford																				ROA; 39																	36th	205
2021	James Davison	53	Chevy																											DAR; 36										36th	205

-The No. 53 car was renumbered to the No. 36 for the 2020 Daytona 500 with David Ragan as the driver. Front Row Motorsports prepared the car.

-The No. 53 car was renumbered to the No. 28 in honor of Davey Allison for the GEICO 500 at Talladega Superspeedway.

=== Car No. 54 history ===
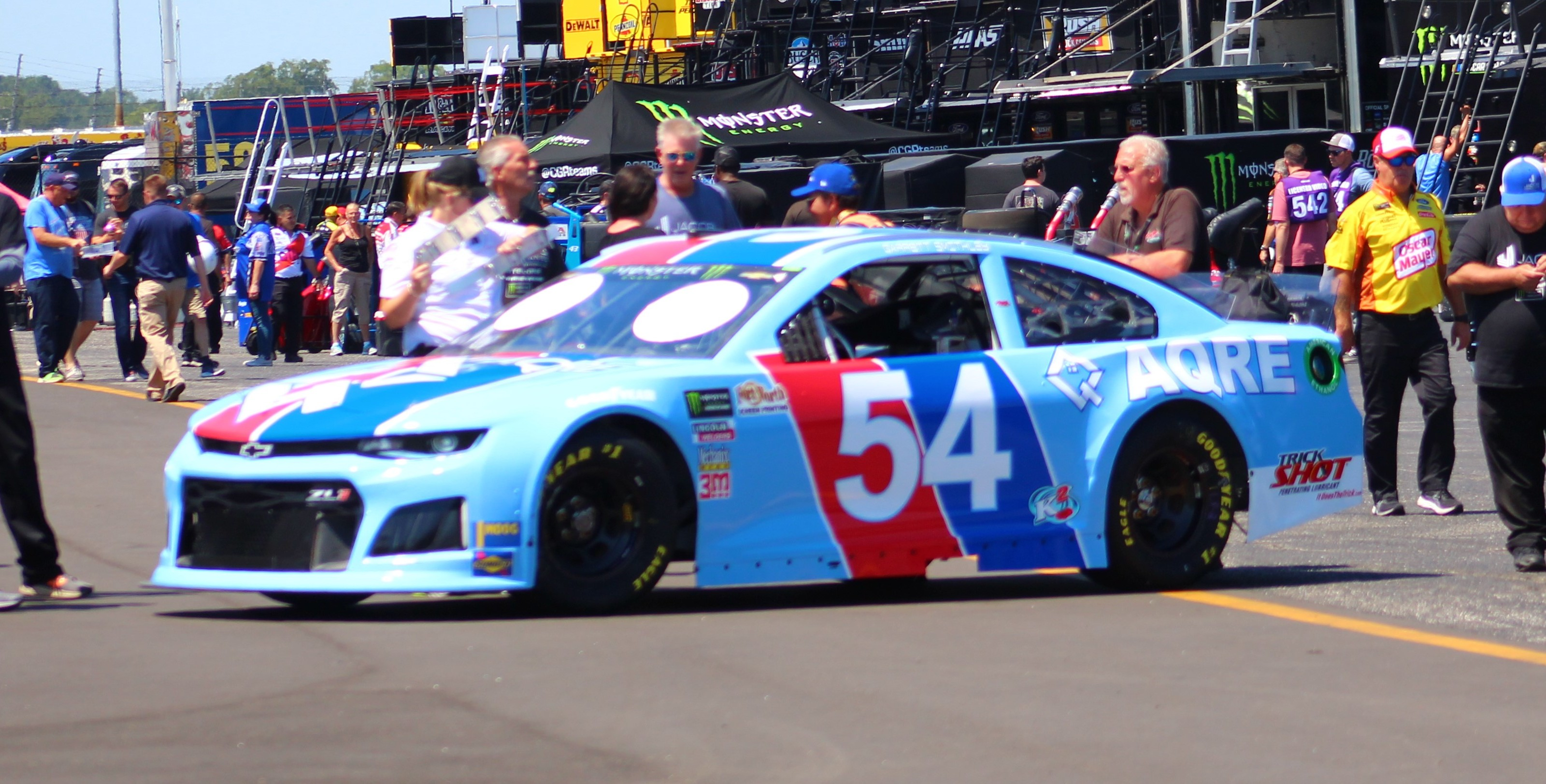
Garrett Smithley's No. 54 at Darlington Raceway in 2019

In August 2019, RWR announced they were going to field a fourth car, the No. 54. The team planned to compete at the Bristol night race, with J. J. Yeley behind the wheel. The team originally received sponsorship from the thrash metal band Slayer to promote the band's final tour. However, some controversial incidents around metal bands caused Slayer to pull their sponsorship. RWR replaced the sponsor with PODS for the race. Yeley drove the car to a 28th-place finish. Garrett Smithley then raced a Lennie Pond throwback-paint-job at Darlington and finished 35th. Yeley returned to the team at Indianapolis and finished 26th, the No. 54's best finish. Smithley returned at Dover and finished 33rd.

In 2020, Yeley attempted the Daytona 500 in the car, but missed the field. RWR shut down the No. 54 team during the season.

==== Car No. 54 results ====
Year	Driver	No.	Make	1	2	3	4	5	6	7	8	9	10	11	12	13	14	15	16	17	18	19	20	21	22	23	24	25	26	27	28	29	30	31	32	33	34	35	36	Owners	Pts
2019	J. J. Yeley	54	Ford	DAY	ATL	LVS	PHO	CAL	MAR	TEX	BRI	RCH	TAL	DOV	KAN	CLT	POC	MCH	SON	CHI	DAY	KEN	NHA	POC	GLN	MCH	BRI; 28													43rd	26
2019	J. J. Yeley	54	Chevy																										IND; 26	LVS	RCH	CLT								43rd	26
2019	Garrett Smithley	54	Chevy																									DAR; 35												43rd	26
2019	Garrett Smithley	54	Ford																														DOV; 33	TAL	KAN	MAR	TEX	PHO	HOM	43rd	26
2020	J. J. Yeley	54	Ford	DAY; DNQ	LVS	CAL	PHO	DAR	DAR	CLT	CLT	BRI	ATL	MAR	HOM	TAL	POC	POC	IND	KEN	TEX	KAN	NHA	MCH	MCH	DAY	DOV	DOV	DAY	DAR	RCH	BRI	LVS	TAL	ROV	KAN	TEX	MAR	PHO	45th	0

=== Car No. 70 history ===
In 1998, Rick Ware attempted to qualify in the No. 70 Ford in the Winston Cup event at Sonoma Raceway but failed to make the race.

==== Car No. 70 results ====
Year	Driver	No.	Make	1	2	3	4	5	6	7	8	9	10	11	12	13	14	15	16	17	18	19	20	21	22	23	24	25	26	27	28	29	30	31	32	33	Owners	Pts
1998	Rick Ware	70	Ford	DAY	CAR	LVS	ATL	DAR	BRI	TEX	MAR	TAL	CAL	CLT	DOV	RCH	MCH	POC	SON; DNQ	NHA	POC	IND	GLN	MCH	BRI	NHA	DAR	RCH	DOV	MAR	CLT	TAL	DAY	PHO	CAR	ATL	NA	0

== Xfinity Series ==
=== Car No. 15 history ===
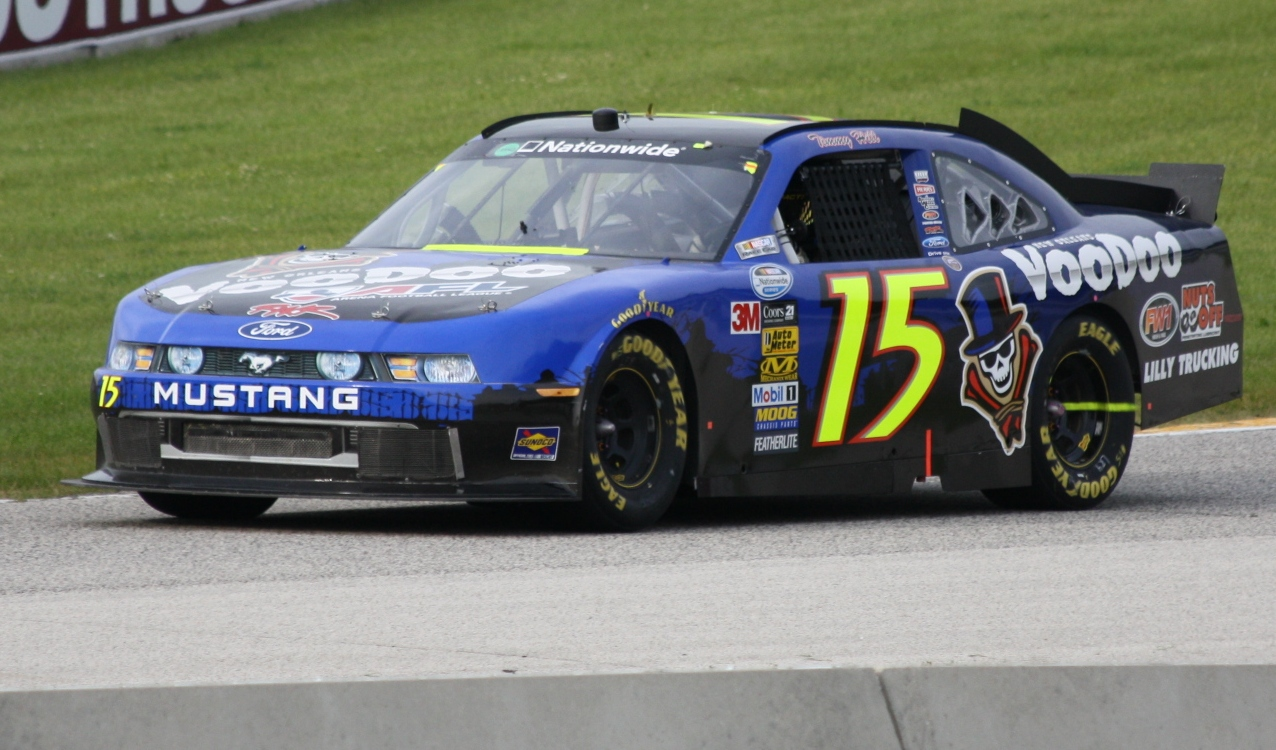
RWR's No. 15 driven to the 2011 Rookie of the Year by Timmy Hill

For 2011, RWR returned to the Nationwide Series, running the No. 15 car with Ford's purchased from Roush Fenway Racing. Ware ran ARCA development driver Timmy Hill for Rookie of the Year honors. Hill won Rookie of the Year but was forced to miss the season opener at Daytona because Hill didn't turn 18 (NASCAR's minimum age to drive in the three national series) until February 25. Germain Racing ran the No. 15 Toyota in Hill's place with Todd Bodine at Daytona before selling the points to RWR. Hill would eventually win Rookie of the Year over primary rivals Blake Koch and Ryan Truex.

In 2012, Koch joined RWR full-time as Hill moved up to RWR's Sprint Cup program. Hill ran the season-opening race at Daytona before the No. 15 was moved to a limited schedule with Jeffrey Earnhardt driving at Bristol with Sam's Club. Koch's original sponsor dropped their agreement due to ESPN not showing the sponsor's ad due to Koch being an outspoken Christian. Hill returned to Nationwide after a failed Rookie of the Year run in Cup, and drove the 41 while Koch drove the 15 as an occasional start and park.

In 2013, the team returned with the No. 15 Ford Mustang driven by Juan Carlos Blum and Harrison Rhodes. The team also fielded cars for Carl Long. For 2014, RWR drove primarily with Carlos Contreras, Hill, and Josh Reaume.

In 2015, the team reunited with Contreras and Hill, but also ran with B. J. McLeod and Jimmy Weller III. For 2016, the team celebrated its 25th anniversary, The team partnered with B. J. McLeod Motorsports to share the No. 15, while RWR runs the 25. The team shut down the Xfinity program after the 2016 season to focus on the Truck Series.

==== Car No. 15 results ====
Year	Driver	No.	Make	1	2	3	4	5	6	7	8	9	10	11	12	13	14	15	16	17	18	19	20	21	22	23	24	25	26	27	28	29	30	31	32	33	34	Owners	Pts
2011	Timmy Hill	15	Ford	DAY	PHO; 29	LVS; 24	BRI; 29	CAL; 32	TEX; 28	TAL; 14	NSH; 33	RCH; 26	DAR; 19	DOV; 22	IOW; 30	CLT; 23	CHI; 15	MCH; 27	ROA; 11	DAY; 23	KEN; 26	NHA; 23	NSH; 22	IRP; 23	IOW; 21	GLN; 31	CGV; 22	BRI; 22	ATL; 36	RCH; 17	CHI; 22	DOV; 22	KAN; 34	CLT; 21	TEX; 33	PHO; 18	HOM; 21		
2012	Timmy Hill	15	Ford	DAY; 7	PHO	LVS																					ATL; 33		CHI; 33					TEX; DNQ		HOM; DNQ			
2012	Timmy Hill	15	Chevy																							BRI; 25													
2012	Jeffrey Earnhardt	15	Ford				BRI; 26				TAL; 25								DAY; 30																				
2012	Scott Riggs	15	Chevy					CAL; 37																															
2012	Scott Riggs	15	Ford							RCH; DNQ												IND; 37																	
2012	Blake Koch	15	Chevy						TEX; 36			DAR; 34	IOW; 40	CLT	DOV; 41	MCH; 36	ROA	KEN; 41																					
2012	Charles Lewandoski	15	Chevy																	NHA; 39																			
2012	Carl Long	15	Chevy																		CHI; 42									KEN; 37									
2012	Carl Long	15	Ford																																PHO; 41				
2012	Dusty Davis	15	Chevy																				IOW; 40																
2012	Chris Cook	15	Chevy																					GLN; 37	CGV; 39														
2012	Matt Carter	15	Chevy																									RCH; 39											
2012	Kelly Bires	15	Chevy																												DOV; 42								
2012	Stanton Barrett	15	Ford																													CLT; 29	KAN						
2013	Juan Carlos Blum	15	Ford	DAY; 37	PHO; 26	LVS; 28		CAL; 29	TEX; 29																														
2013	Scott Riggs	15	Ford				BRI; 20																																
2013	Stanton Barrett	15	Ford							RCH; DNQ	TAL; DNQ	DAR	CLT	DOV											MOH; 35														
2013	Carl Long	15	Ford												IOW; 38	MCH; 35	ROA	KEN	DAY	NHA	CHI; 35	IND	IOW; 36	GLN															
2013	Carl Long	15	Chevy																							BRI; DNQ	ATL	RCH	CHI; DNQ	KEN									
2013	Chase Miller	15	Chevy																												DOV; 37	KAN; DNQ	CLT	TEX	PHO	HOM			
2014	Carlos Contreras	15	Ford	DAY; DNQ	PHO	LVS	BRI	CAL	TEX	DAR	RCH	TAL	IOW	CLT																									
2014	Ryan Ellis	15	Chevy												DOV; 38	MCH																							
2014	Carl Long	15	Chevy														ROA; 35	KEN	DAY	NHA	CHI	IND	IOW	GLN	MOH; 36	BRI	ATL	RCH	CHI	KEN	DOV	KAN	CLT	TEX	PHO	HOM			
2015	Carlos Contreras	15	Chevy	DAY; DNQ						BRI; 36	RCH; 34	TAL; DNQ												MOH; 36			DAR; 37									HOM; 36			
2015	Chris Cockrum	15	Chevy		ATL; 29																																		
2015	Cody Ware	15	Chevy			LVS; 34																																	
2015	Enrique Contreras III	15	Chevy				PHO; 34																																
2015	Stanton Barrett	15	Chevy					CAL; 32																															
2015	Stanton Barrett	15	Ford						TEX; 37												IND; 28										DOV; 30								
2015	B. J. McLeod	15	Chevy										IOW; 36	CLT; 37	DOV; 27				KEN; 34													CLT; 35	KAN	TEX					
2015	Jimmy Weller III	15	Chevy													MCH; 30	CHI; 29	DAY																					
2015	Todd Peck	15	Chevy																	NHA; 30																			
2015	Anthony Kumpen	15	Chevy																			IOW; 28																	
2015	Ryan Ellis	15	Chevy																				GLN; 22		BRI; 28			RCH; 35	CHI	KEN; 37									
2015	Kevin O'Connell	15	Chevy																							ROA; 17													
2015	Korbin Forrister	15	Chevy																																PHO; 32				
2016	Stanton Barrett	15	Dodge	DAY; DNQ																																			
2016	Stanton Barrett	15	Ford			LVS; 30																																	
2016	Cody Ware	15	Chevy		ATL; 31																																		
2016	Todd Peck	15	Ford				PHO; 37	CAL; 30	TEX; 37																														
2016	Jeff Green	15	Ford							BRI; 27	RCH	TAL	DOV	CLT	POC	MCH	IOW																						
2016	Ryan Ellis	15	Chevy															DAY; 15	KEN	NHA	IND	IOW	GLN	MOH	BRI	ROA	DAR	RCH	CHI	KEN	DOV	CLT	KAN	TEX	PHO	HOM			

=== Car No. 17 history ===
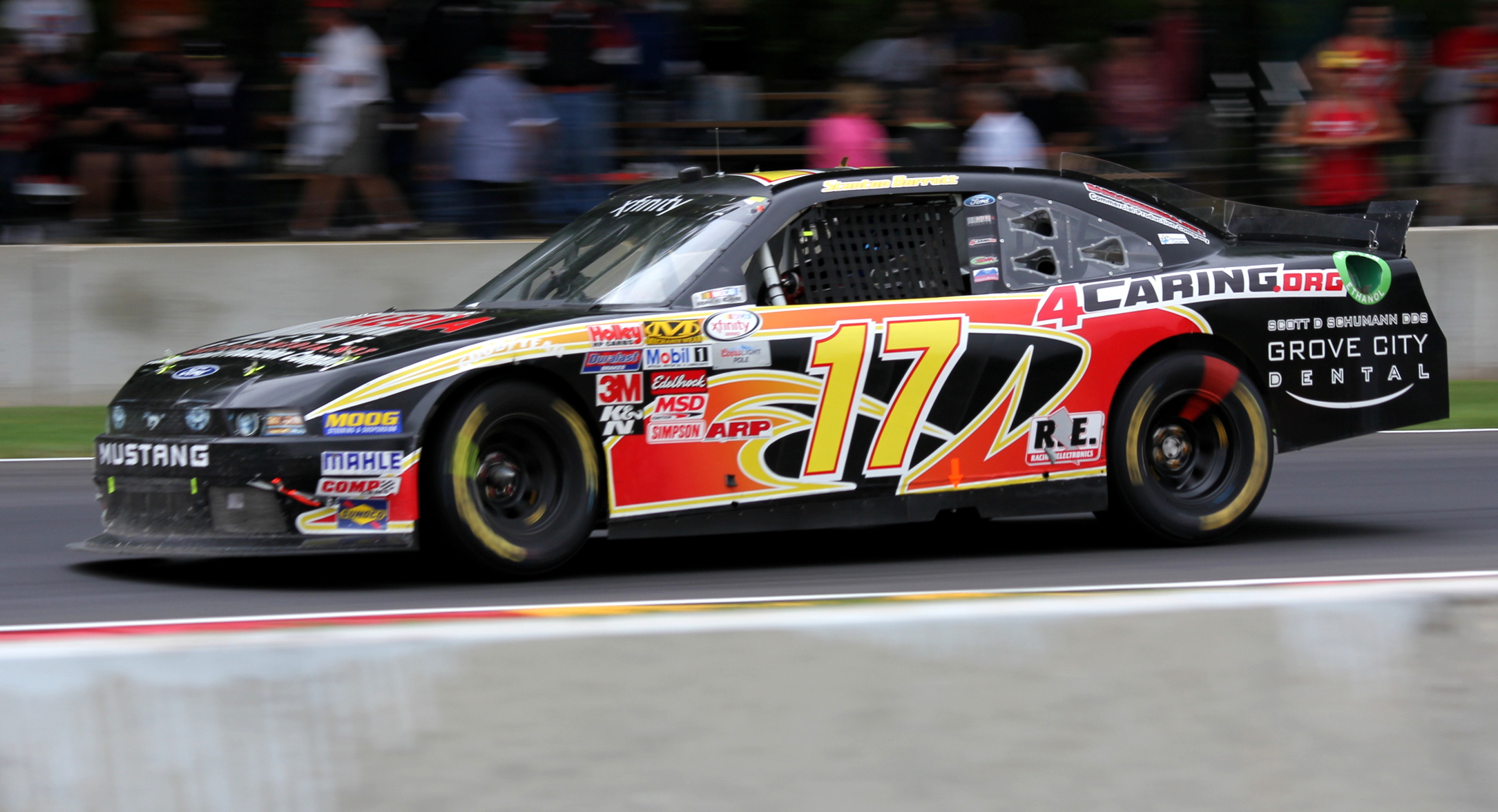
Barrett's No. 17 Ford Mustang at Road America in 2015

In 2015, the team fielded the No. 17 car part-time for Stanton Barrett, Ryan Ellis, and Timmy Hill.

In 2016, Jeff Green drove the No. 17 car at both Daytona races.

In 2019, the team announced that the No. 17 car would run full-time. Chris Cockrum drove at Daytona and Talladega. Bayley Currey ran most of the races. Kyle Weatherman ran at Bristol and other races. Starting sometime around the Charlotte race in May, RWR partnered with Mike Harmon Racing (again) to field the No. 17 car together for the remainder of the season. The font that Harmon uses on his No. 74 car is now used on the No. 17 as well. Camden Murphy drove at Charlotte and Pocono. The team withdrew at Iowa and was not entered at Daytona. The team sold their owner points before Iowa to the new No. 28 H2 Motorsports car driven by Shane Lee, which indicated that the team may only run part-time for the rest of the year. Josh Bilicki drove at Chicagoland after Currey qualified the car while Bilicki failed to qualify his own No. 38 car for RSS Racing. Both Murphy and Currey would return for Kentucky and New Hampshire, respectfully. Part-time ARCA Menards Series driver Mark Meunier attempted to make his Xfinity debut at Iowa in July but failed to qualify. The No. 17 would also skip both road course races at Watkins Glen and Mid-Ohio.

In May 2020, Ware formed a partnership with SS-Green Light Racing to field his drivers in the latter's No. 07 car; Ware is close friends with SS-Green Light owner Bobby Dotter. The collaboration spawned after the No. 07's regular driver Ray Black Jr. was forced to exit full-time racing to focus on his family business. Garrett Smithley took over the car for the partnership's first race at Charlotte.

In 2021, Ware's partnership with Dotter continued by Ware using Dotter's No. 08 owner points to field the No. 17 car. However, during the spring Talladega weekend, The No. 17 was switched to No. 28 and ran as a tribute to Davey Allison with Joey Gase as the driver.

==== Car No. 17 results ====
Year	Driver	No.	Make	1	2	3	4	5	6	7	8	9	10	11	12	13	14	15	16	17	18	19	20	21	22	23	24	25	26	27	28	29	30	31	32	33	Owners	Pts
2015	Stanton Barrett	17	Ford	DAY	ATL	LVS	PHO	CAL	TEX	BRI	RCH	TAL	IOW	CLT	DOV	MCH	CHI	DAY	KEN	NHA	IND	IOW	GLN	MOH	BRI	ROA; 26												
2015	Ryan Ellis	17	Ford																								DAR; 40	RCH	CHI	KEN								
2015	Ryan Ellis	17	Chevy																														KAN; 34	TEX	PHO	HOM		
2015	Timmy Hill	17	Chevy																												DOV; 35	CLT						
2016	Jeff Green	17	Chevy	DAY; 37	ATL	LVS	PHO	CAL	TEX	BRI	RCH	TAL	DOV	CLT	POC	MCH	IOW																					
2016	Jeff Green	17	Toyota															DAY; 7	KEN	NHA	IND	IOW	GLN	MOH	BRI	ROA	DAR	RCH	CHI	KEN	DOV	CLT	KAN	TEX	PHO	HOM		
2019	Chris Cockrum	17	Chevy	DAY; 31								TAL; 10																										
2019	Bayley Currey	17	Chevy		ATL; 22	LVS; 34	PHO; 37	CAL; 35	TEX; DNQ				DOV; 34	CLT; 33		MCH; 33	IOW	CHI; QL			NHA; 35												KAN; 35					
2019	Kyle Weatherman	17	Chevy							BRI; 28	RCH; 32																	IND; 35						TEX; 34				
2019	Camden Murphy	17	Chevy												POC; 32					KEN; 33																		
2019	Josh Bilicki	17	Chevy															CHI; 35	DAY																			
2019	Mark Meunier	17	Chevy																			IOW; DNQ	GLN	MOH														
2019	Joe Nemechek	17	Chevy																						BRI; 35	ROA	DAR; 34		LVS; 33	RCH; 32	CLT	DOV; 30			PHO; 34			
2019	Robby Lyons	17	Chevy																																	HOM; 28		
2020	Cody Ware	17	Ford	DAY	LVS	CAL	PHO	DAR	CLT	BRI	ATL	HOM	HOM	TAL	POC	IND	KEN	KEN	TEX	KAN	ROA	DAY	DOV	DOV	DAY	DAR	RCH	RCH	BRI	LVS	TAL	CLT; 7	KAN	TEX		PHO		
2020	J. J. Yeley	17	Ford																																MAR; 14			
2021	Cody Ware	17	Chevy	DAY; 39					ATL; 23				DOV; 23																									
2021	Cody Ware	17	Ford		DAY; 25											MOH; 15				ROA; 24																		
2021	Cody Ware	17	Toyota												CLT; 20																							
2021	J. J. Yeley	17	Chevy			HOM; 12		PHO; 13		MAR; 24		DAR; 22										NHA; 23		IND; 22		DAY; 13		RCH; 29		LVS; 37			TEX; 40		MAR; 16			
2021	Garrett Smithley	17	Chevy				LVS; 24										TEX; 25														TAL; 19							
2021	Garrett Smithley	17	Toyota																															KAN; 18				
2021	Joey Gase	28	Ford								TAL; 36																											
2021	Cole Custer	17	Ford											COA; 7																								
2021	Joe Graf Jr.	17	Chevy															NSH; 34														CLT; 28				PHO; 35		
2021	Carson Ware	17	Chevy																POC; 28		ATL; 36				MCH; 28				BRI; 32									
2021	Josh Bilicki	17	Chevy																				GLN; 24															
2021	Mason Massey	17	Chevy																								DAR; 18											

=== Car No. 23 history ===
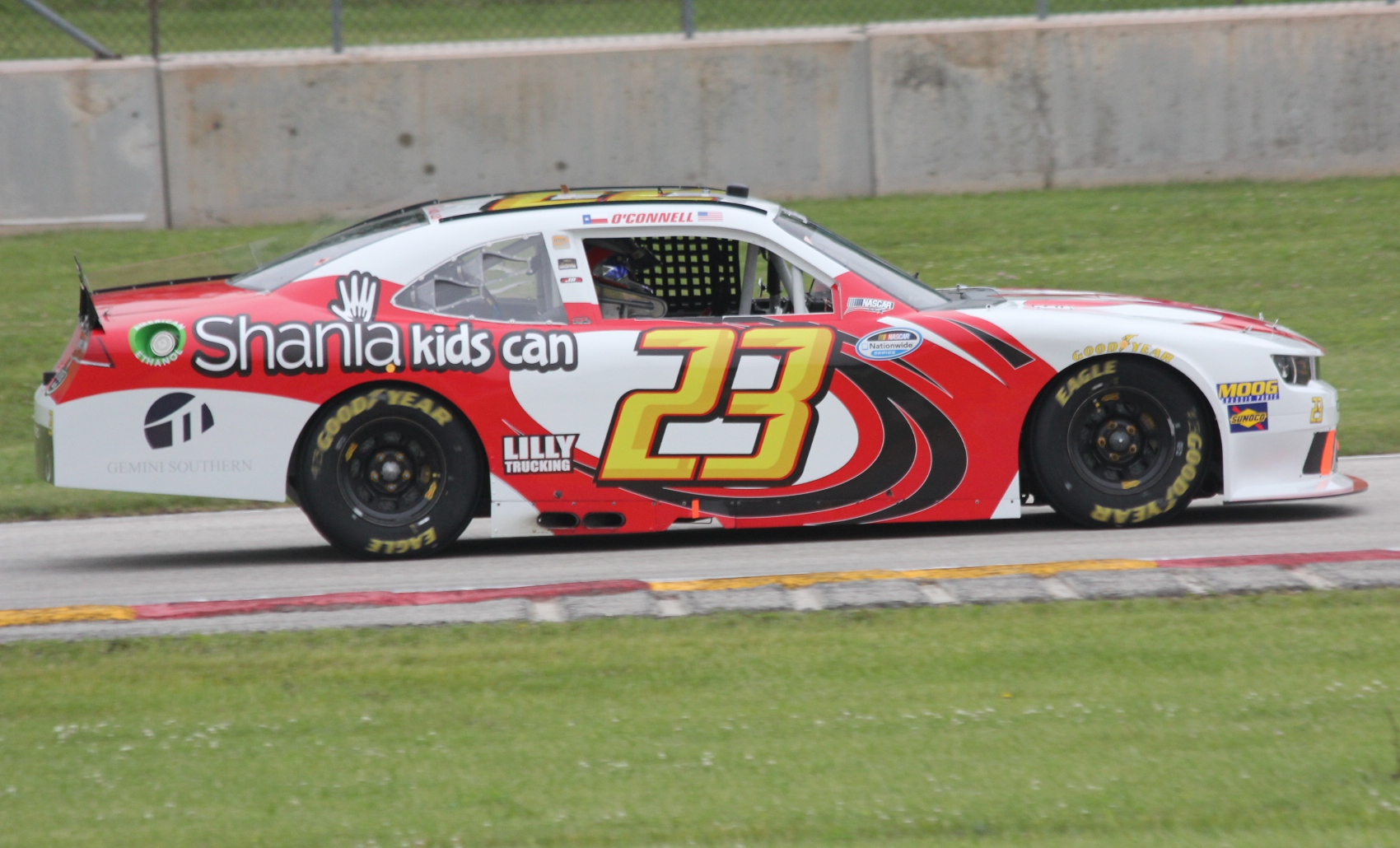
Kevin O'Connell in the No. 23 car at Road America in 2014

In 2013, the team fielded the No. 23 car part-time for multiple drivers such as Harrison Rhodes, Carl Long, Scott Riggs, Stanton Barrett, Richard Harriman, Anthony Gandon, Juan Carlos Blum, Donnie Neuenberger, Jennifer Jo Cobb, and Timmy Hill.

In 2014, the No. 23 car returned with multiple drivers such as Carlos Contreras, Timmy Hill, Josh Reaume, Ryan Ellis, Kevin O'Connell, Richard Harriman, Carl Long, Cody Ware, Blake Koch, and Mackena Bell. The No. 23 car scored the best finish of 3rd at Road America with O'Connell behind the wheel.

==== Car No. 23 results ====
Year	Driver	No.	Make	1	2	3	4	5	6	7	8	9	10	11	12	13	14	15	16	17	18	19	20	21	22	23	24	25	26	27	28	29	30	31	32	33	Owners	Pts
2013	Harrison Rhodes	23	Ford	DAY	PHO; 25	LVS	BRI					DAR; 31	CLT	DOV; 26	IOW; 23			KEN; 29	DAY		CHI; 32	IND								KEN; 32								
2013	Carl Long	23	Ford					CAL; 30	TEX	RCH	TAL																											
2013	Scott Riggs	23	Ford													MCH; 23																						
2013	Stanton Barrett	23	Ford														ROA; 19																					
2013	Stanton Barrett	23	Chevy																	NHA; 27																		
2013	Richard Harriman	23	Ford																				IOW; 29															
2013	Anthony Gandon	23	Ford																					GLN; 32	MOH; 28	BRI	ATL	RCH										
2013	Juan Carlos Blum	23	Ford																										CHI; 29									
2013	Donnie Neuenberger	23	Ford																												DOV; 34							
2013	Jennifer Jo Cobb	23	Ford																													KAN; 26	CLT	TEX				
2013	Timmy Hill	23	Chevy																																PHO; 23	HOM; 23		
2014	Carlos Contreras	23	Chevy	DAY	PHO; 29	LVS		CAL; 29	TEX	DAR; 24			IOW; 33	CLT; 33						NHA; 35							ATL; 37						CLT; 29	TEX		HOM; 32		
2014	Timmy Hill	23	Chevy				BRI; 21								DOV; 21																DOV; 25	KAN; 39						
2014	Josh Reaume	23	Chevy								RCH; 30	TAL						KEN; 35	DAY																			
2014	Ryan Ellis	23	Chevy													MCH; 29																						
2014	Kevin O'Connell	23	Chevy														ROA; 3							GLN; 37														
2014	Richard Harriman	23	Chevy																		CHI; 32	IND																
2014	Carl Long	23	Chevy																				IOW; 32															
2014	Cody Ware	23	Chevy																						MOH; 15			RCH; 29	CHI; 29	KEN; 32								
2014	Blake Koch	23	Chevy																							BRI; 35												
2014	Mackena Bell	23	Chevy																																PHO; 29			

==== Car No. 25 history ====
In 2016, the team celebrated its 25th anniversary by fielding the No. 25 car for multiple drivers such as Cody Ware, Harrison Rhodes, Ryan Ellis, Travis Kvapil, Scott Lagasse Jr., Stanton Barrett, Spencer Boyd, Camden Murphy, Todd Peck, Jennifer Jo Cobb, Austin Theriault, and Josh Reaume.

===== Car No. 25 results =====
Year	Driver	No.	Make	1	2	3	4	5	6	7	8	9	10	11	12	13	14	15	16	17	18	19	20	21	22	23	24	25	26	27	28	29	30	31	32	33	Owners	Pts
2016	Cody Ware	25	Chevy	DAY	ATL	LVS; 35	PHO	CAL; 31	TEX; 36																													
2016	Harrison Rhodes	25	Chevy							BRI; 26	RCH; 27	TAL																										
2016	Ryan Ellis	25	Chevy										DOV; 31	CLT	POC; 25	MCH								MOH; 18			DAR; 33	RCH	CHI; 27		DOV; 36	CLT						
2016	Travis Kvapil	25	Ford														IOW; 23																					
2016	Scott Lagasse Jr.	25	Ford															DAY; 25	KEN	NHA																		
2016	Stanton Barrett	25	Chevy																		IND; 31																	
2016	Spencer Boyd	25	Chevy																			IOW; 29	GLN															
2016	Camden Murphy	25	Chevy																						BRI; 26	ROA												
2016	Todd Peck	25	Ford																											KEN; 25								
2016	Jennifer Jo Cobb	25	Chevy																														KAN; 29					
2016	Austin Theriault	25	Chevy																															TEX; 29	PHO			
2016	Josh Reaume	25	Chevy																																	HOM; 33		

=== Car No. 31 history ===
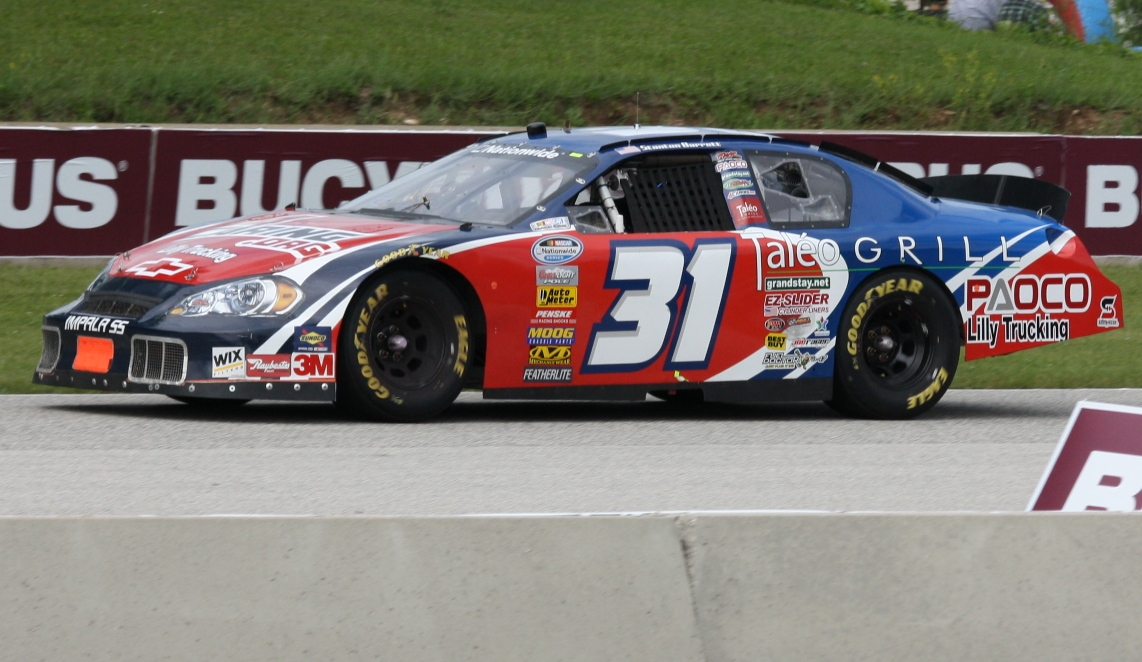
Stanton Barrett in the No. 31 car at Road America in 2010

After taking a five-year hiatus from the Nationwide series to focus on the Motocross, Supercross, Arenacross, and Women's Motocross series', the team made a return in 2009.

With a new attitude, the organization returned under the Chevrolet banner by fielding the No. 31. RWR purchased equipment from Stanton Barrett Motorsports to start the season and quickly moved to ECR engines after power issues hindered the team.

Drivers Stanton Barrett, Tim Andrews, Kerry Earnhardt, Tim Andrews, Daryl Harr, Travis Kittleson, Kevin Hamlin, and Nick Joanides all split the time in the No. 31 car. RWR later signed developmental driver Jeffrey Earnhardt, the grandson of Dale Earnhardt. Jeffrey Earnhardt's series debut at Dover was cut short with a late crash in practice and a subsequent DNQ.

2009 was a significant year for the team. At Lowes Motor Speedway, Stanton Barrett qualified the No. 31 in the 11th position. Kerry Earnhardt finished 12th at Talladega Speedway and also qualified 8th at Daytona International Speedway, both organizational benchmarks. Tim Andrews went into the history books as he was led by crew chief and father Paul Andrews, marking the first time in NASCAR history that a father was a crew chief for a son in the Nationwide Series.

In 2010, Stanton Barrett competed in the No. 31 Fuel Doctor Chevy at Daytona and Las Vegas. J.C. Stout also made a race in the No. 31 at IRP.

==== Car No. 31 results ====
Year	Driver	No.	Make	1	2	3	4	5	6	7	8	9	10	11	12	13	14	15	16	17	18	19	20	21	22	23	24	25	26	27	28	29	30	31	32	33	34	35	Owners	Pts
2009	Stanton Barrett	31	Chevy	DAY; DNQ	CAL; 28	LVS; 28	BRI; DNQ							CLT; 25							CHI; DNQ	GTY; DNQ											CAL; DNQ							
2009	Kerry Earnhardt	31	Chevy					TEX; DNQ			TAL; 12									DAY; 38																				
2009	Tim Andrews	31	Chevy						NSH; 33																						DOV; 31	KAN		CLT; 26				HOM; 30		
2009	Daryl Harr	31	Chevy							PHO; 37						NSH; DNQ									GLN; DNQ			CGV; DNQ	ATL								PHO; DNQ			
2009	Travis Kittleson	31	Chevy									RCH; DNQ	DAR; 38				KEN; DNQ	MLW; 29	NHA; 38				IRP; 27	IOW			BRI; DNQ			RCH; 27										
2009	Jeffrey Earnhardt	31	Chevy												DOV; DNQ																									
2009	Kevin Hamlin	31	Chevy																							MCH; 41														
2009	Nick Joanides	31	Chevy																																MEM; DNQ	TEX				
2010	Stanton Barrett	31	Chevy	DAY; 37	CAL	LVS; 24	BRI	NSH	PHO	TEX	TAL	RCH	DAR					ROA; 17	NHA	DAY	CHI	GTY														TEX; 33	PHO	HOM		
2010	Donnie Neuenberger	31	Chevy											DOV; Wth	CLT	NSH	KEN																							
2010	J.C. Stout	31	Chevy																				IRP; 29	IOW	GLN	MCH	BRI													
2010	Kevin O'Connell	31	Chevy																									CGV; DNQ	ATL	RCH	DOV	KAN	CAL	CLT	GTY					

=== Car No. 39 history ===
At the 2012 Indiana 250, RWR fielded the No. 39 Chevrolet for Jeffrey Earnhardt using Go Green Racing's owner points.

==== Car No. 39 results ====
Year	Driver	No.	Make	1	2	3	4	5	6	7	8	9	10	11	12	13	14	15	16	17	18	19	20	21	22	23	24	25	26	27	28	29	30	31	32	33	Owners	Pts
2012	Jeffrey Earnhardt	39	Chevy	DAY	PHO	LVS	BRI	CAL	TEX	RCH	TAL	DAR	IOW	CLT	DOV	MCH	ROA	KEN	DAY	NHA	CHI	IND; 21	IOW	GLN	CGV	BRI	ATL	RCH	CHI	KEN	DOV	CLT	KAN	TEX	PHO	HOM		

=== Car No. 41 history ===
In 2009, RWR fielded the No. 41 Chevrolet for multiple drivers such as Derrike Cope, Justin Hobgood, Stanton Barrett, Tom Hubert, and, Kevin Hamlin.

In 2010, RWR fielded the No. 41 in select races with Chrissy Wallace and Stanton Barrett as the drivers. At Daytona, RWR went into the record books again, this time with driver Chrissy Wallace. Wallace became the first female driver to make her series debut at Daytona in the No. 41 Chevrolet. Danica Patrick with JR Motorsports also accomplished the feat in the same event. Barrett rallied to a fourteenth-place finish at Darlington Raceway while leading laps for the first time in RWR history.

In 2011, RWR ran the No. 41 car full-time with multiple drivers such Patrick Sheltra, Carl Long, Jennifer Jo Cobb Jeffrey Earnhardt, Doug Harrington, Fain Skinner, Matt Carter, Tomy Drissi, Johnny Chapman, and Stanton Barrett.

In 2012, the No. 41 car returned for another full-time season with multiple drivers such as Blake Koch, Timmy Hill, Fain Skinner, Juan Carlos Blum, Nur Ali, and Noel Dowler.

==== Car No. 41 results ====
Year	Driver	No.	Make	1	2	3	4	5	6	7	8	9	10	11	12	13	14	15	16	17	18	19	20	21	22	23	24	25	26	27	28	29	30	31	32	33	34	35	Owners	Pts
2009	Derrike Cope	41	Chevy	DAY; DNQ	CAL; 43	LVS; DNQ	BRI	TEX	NSH	PHO	TAL	RCH																												
2009	Justin Hobgood	41	Chevy										DAR; DNQ	CLT	DOV	NSH; DNQ	KEN; 41		NHA; DNQ	DAY	CHI	GTY	IRP	IOW																
2009	Stanton Barrett	41	Chevy															MLW; DNQ										CGV; 24	ATL	RCH										
2009	Tom Hubert	41	Chevy																						GLN; 41	MCH	BRI													
2009	Kevin Hamlin	41	Chevy																												DOV; 43	KAN	CAL; 38	CLT	MEM	TEX	PHO	HOM		
2010	Chrissy Wallace	41	Chevy	DAY; 43	CAL	LVS	BRI	NSH	PHO	TEX	TAL	RCH																												
2010	Stanton Barrett	41	Chevy										DAR; 14	DOV	CLT	NSH	KEN	ROA	NHA	DAY	CHI	GTY	IRP	IOW	GLN	MCH	BRI	CGV; DNQ	ATL	RCH	DOV	KAN	CAL	CLT	GTY	TEX	PHO	HOM		
2011	Patrick Sheltra	41	Ford	DAY; 24																																				
2011	Carl Long	41	Ford		PHO; 36	LVS; 32	BRI; 28				NSH; 40	RCH; 35	DAR; 33	DOV; 34	IOW; 35		CHI; 31					NHA; 36	NSH; 33																	
2011	Carl Long	41	Chevy															MCH; 35			KEN; DNQ																			
2011	Jennifer Jo Cobb	41	Ford					CAL; 38	TEX; 29	TAL; 37																														
2011	Doug Harrington	41	Ford																ROA; 30																					
2011	Fain Skinner	41	Chevy																					IRP; 26																
2011	Matt Carter	41	Chevy																						IOW; 35															
2011	Tomy Drissi	41	Ford																							GLN; DNQ	CGV; DNQ													
2011	Johnny Chapman	41	Chevy																									BRI; DNQ	ATL; 43	RCH; 34	CHI; 38	DOV; 35	KAN; 38	CLT; 40	TEX; DNQ	PHO; 40				
2011	Stanton Barrett	41	Chevy																																		HOM; 31			
2012	Blake Koch	41	Ford	DAY; 17	PHO; 31	LVS; 18	BRI; 38																																	
2012	Timmy Hill	41	Ford						TEX; 28	RCH; 26	TAL; 21	DAR; 16	IOW; 25	CLT; 19	DOV; 31	MCH; 26	ROA; 22	KEN; 32		NHA; 21	CHI; 18	IND; 23	IOW; 30	GLN; 35	CGV; 36			RCH; 31		KEN; 29	DOV; 24	CLT; 33								
2012	Timmy Hill	41	Chevy																DAY; 9																					
2012	Fain Skinner	41	Ford																							BRI; 28	ATL; 37													
2012	Juan Carlos Blum	41	Chevy																										CHI; 26					TEX; 29		HOM; 37				
2012	Nur Ali	41	Chevy																														KAN; 33							
2012	Noel Dowler	41	Ford																																PHO; 32					

=== Car No. 51 history ===
In 2003, Ware Racing Enterprises made a return in the Busch Series by fielding the No. 51 Chevrolet for Stan Boyd at Phoenix and Homestead. He failed to qualify for both of the races.

In 2004, The team run the No. 51 with a combination of Dodge, Chevrolet, and Ford cars with various drivers such as Stanton Barrett, Stan Boyd, Kim Crosby, Bobby Dotter, David Eshleman, Kenny Hendrick, Travis Powell, Morgan Shepherd, Shane Sieg, Dana White and J. J. Yeley.

==== Car No. 51 results ====
Year	Driver	No.	Make	1	2	3	4	5	6	7	8	9	10	11	12	13	14	15	16	17	18	19	20	21	22	23	24	25	26	27	28	29	30	31	32	33	34	Owners	Pts
2003	Stan Boyd	51	Chevy	DAY	CAR	LVS	DAR	BRI	TEX	TAL	NSH	CAL	RCH	GTY	NZH	CLT	DOV	NSH	KEN	MLW	DAY	CHI	NHA	PPR	IRP	MCH	BRI	DAR	RCH	DOV	KAN	CLT	MEM	ATL	PHO; DNQ	CAR	HOM; DNQ		
2004	Kevin Conway	51	Dodge	DAY; DNQ																																			
2004	Shane Sieg	51	Dodge		CAR; DNQ	LVS; 42	DAR; 37																																
2004	Stan Boyd	51	Chevy					BRI; 25					GTY; 32				DOV; 38		KEN; 43																				
2004	Stan Boyd	51	Dodge						TEX; DNQ	NSH; DNQ		CAL; 38											NHA; 39																
2004	Kim Crosby	51	Dodge								TAL; 20										DAY; 31			PPR; 40															
2004	Kim Crosby	51	Chevy																							MCH; 38													
2004	Dana White	51	Dodge																						IRP; DNQ														
2004	Morgan Shepherd	51	Ford											RCH; 34																									
2004	Morgan Shepherd	51	Dodge																								BRI; DNQ												
2004	Travis Powell	51	Chevy												NZH; 41																								
2004	J. J. Yeley	51	Chevy													CLT; 15																							
2004	David Eshleman	51	Chevy															NSH; 40																					
2004	Bobby Dotter	51	Chevy																	MLW; 26																			
2004	Blake Mallory	51	Chevy																			CHI; DNQ												ATL; DNQ					
2004	Stanton Barrett	51	Dodge																									CAL; 38											
2004	Wayne Edwards	51	Dodge																										RCH; DNQ										
2004	Kenny Hendrick	51	Dodge																											DOV; 42	KAN; DNQ	CLT; DNQ	MEM; DNQ		PHO; DNQ	DAR	HOM		

=== Car No. 52 history ===
At the 2021 Alsco Uniforms 302, RWR fielded the No. 52 Toyota for Carson Ware using Jimmy Means Racing's owner points.

==== Car No. 52 results ====
Year	Driver	No.	Make	1	2	3	4	5	6	7	8	9	10	11	12	13	14	15	16	17	18	19	20	21	22	23	24	25	26	27	28	29	30	31	32	33	Owners	Pts
2021	Carson Ware	52	Toyota	DAY	DAY	HOM	LVS	PHO	ATL	MAR	TAL	DAR	DOV	COA	CLT	MOH	TEX	NSH	POC	ROA	ATL	NHA	GLN	IND	MCH	DAY	DAR	RCH	BRI	LVS; 31	TAL	CLT	TEX	KAN	MAR	PHO		

=== Car No. 57 history ===
In 2004, the team fielded the No. 57 car part-time with Stan Boyd, Morgan Shepherd, and Bruce Bechtel as the drivers.

==== Car No. 57 results ====
Year	Driver	No.	Make	1	2	3	4	5	6	7	8	9	10	11	12	13	14	15	16	17	18	19	20	21	22	23	24	25	26	27	28	29	30	31	32	33	34	Owners	Pts
2004	Stan Boyd	57	Chevy	DAY; DNQ	CAR	LVS; DNQ	DAR; 41																	PPR; 39	IRP; 27	MCH	BRI	CAL	RCH	DOV	KAN	CLT	MEM	ATL	PHO	DAR	HOM		
2004	Morgan Shepherd	57	Dodge					BRI; 40	TEX	NSH	TAL																												
2004	Bruce Bechtel	57	Chevy									CAL; DNQ	GTY	RCH	NZH	CLT	DOV	NSH	KEN	MLW	DAY	CHI	NHA																

=== Car No. 68 history ===
In 2011, RWR formed a partnership with Fleur-de-lis Motorsports by fielding the No. 68 for Tim Andrews at Las Vegas.

==== Car No. 68 results ====
Year	Driver	No.	Make	1	2	3	4	5	6	7	8	9	10	11	12	13	14	15	16	17	18	19	20	21	22	23	24	25	26	27	28	29	30	31	32	33	34	Owners	Pts
2011	Tim Andrews	68	Ford	DAY	PHO	LVS; 41	BRI	CAL	TEX	TAL	NSH	RCH	DAR	DOV	IOW	CLT	CHI	MCH	ROA	DAY	KEN	NHA	NSH	IRP	IOW	GLN	CGV	BRI	ATL	RCH	CHI	DOV	KAN	CLT	TEX	PHO	HOM		

=== Car No. 70 history ===
At the 2012 Great Clips 200 at Phoenix Raceway, RWR fielded the No. 70 Chevrolet for Timmy Hill using ML Motorsports's owner points.

==== Car No. 70 results ====
Year	Driver	No.	Make	1	2	3	4	5	6	7	8	9	10	11	12	13	14	15	16	17	18	19	20	21	22	23	24	25	26	27	28	29	30	31	32	33	Owners	Pts
2012	Timmy Hill	70	Chevy	DAY	PHO	LVS	BRI	CAL	TEX	RCH	TAL	DAR	IOW	CLT	DOV	MCH	ROA	KEN	DAY	NHA	CHI	IND	IOW	GLN	CGV	BRI	ATL	RCH	CHI	KEN	DOV	CLT	KAN	TEX	PHO; 27	HOM		

=== Car No. 71 history ===
In 2011, RWR fielded the No. 71 car part-time for multiple drivers such as Matt Carter, Carl Long, and Clay Greenfield. At Atlanta, Greenfield pinched up into the wall just under 100 laps into the race and finished 35th after starting in the 43rd position.

In 2012, the No. 71 car made another part-time season with multiple drivers such as Carter, Michael Guerity, Scott Riggs, Carl Long, and Timmy Hill.

==== Car No. 71 results ====
Year	Driver	No.	Make	1	2	3	4	5	6	7	8	9	10	11	12	13	14	15	16	17	18	19	20	21	22	23	24	25	26	27	28	29	30	31	32	33	34	Owners	Pts
2011	Matt Carter	71	Ford	DAY	PHO	LVS	BRI	CAL	TEX	TAL	NSH	RCH	DAR	DOV	IOW	CLT	CHI	MCH	ROA	DAY	KEN	NHA	NSH; 37	IRP				BRI; 41		RCH; 35	CHI; 34	DOV; 32	KAN; 35	CLT; DNQ					
2011	Matt Carter	71	Chevy																																TEX; DNQ	PHO; 39	HOM; 40		
2011	Carl Long	71	Ford																						IOW; 40	GLN	CGV												
2011	Clay Greenfield	71	Ford																										ATL; 35										
2012	Matt Carter	71	Chevy	DAY	PHO	LVS	BRI	CAL	TEX	RCH	TAL	DAR	IOW	CLT	DOV; 35						CHI; 35	IND										CLT; DNQ							
2012	Michael Guerity	71	Chevy													MCH; 40	ROA	KEN	DAY																				
2012	Scott Riggs	71	Ford																	NHA; 34																			
2012	Scott Riggs	71	Chevy																										CHI; 37	KEN									
2012	Carl Long	71	Chevy																				IOW; 38	GLN	CGV	BRI; 37	ATL; 41	RCH; 38											
2012	Carl Long	71	Ford																												DOV; 37								
2012	Timmy Hill	71	Ford																														KAN; 38	TEX	PHO	HOM			

=== Car No. 74 history ===
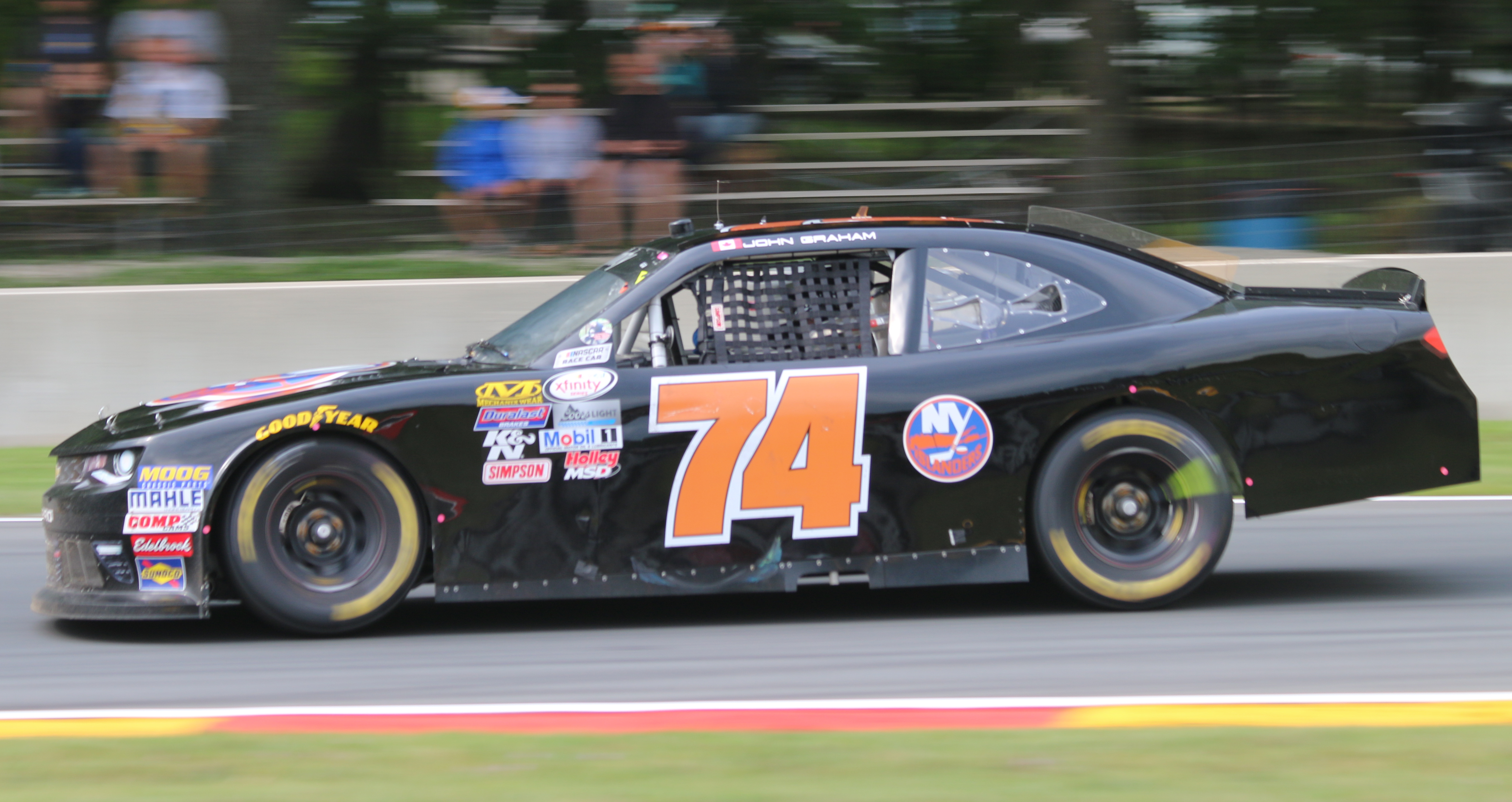
Graham's No. 74 in the Road America Xfinity Series race in 2017

In 2017, the team made a return at Road America in a partnership with Mike Harmon Racing. John Graham drove the No. 74 (usually Harmon's number) for RWR because the car was locked in the race and Harmon's driver: Nicolas Hammann drove the No. 17 (usually RWR's number) and would have to qualify on time but since other cars withdrew both cars make the race. Cody Ware also drove for Harmon in a collaborative effort between RWR and MHR and he continues to drive the No. 74 car part-time for 2018.

==== Car No. 74 results ====
Year	Driver	No.	Make	1	2	3	4	5	6	7	8	9	10	11	12	13	14	15	16	17	18	19	20	21	22	23	24	25	26	27	28	29	30	31	32	33	Owners	Pts
2017	John Graham	74	Chevy	DAY	ATL	LVS	PHO	CAL	TEX	BRI	RCH	TAL	CLT	DOV	POC	MCH	IOW	DAY	KEN	NHA	IND	IOW	GLN	MOH	BRI	ROA; 30	DAR	RCH	CHI	KEN	DOV	CLT	KAN	TEX	PHO	HOM		

=== Car No. 75 history ===
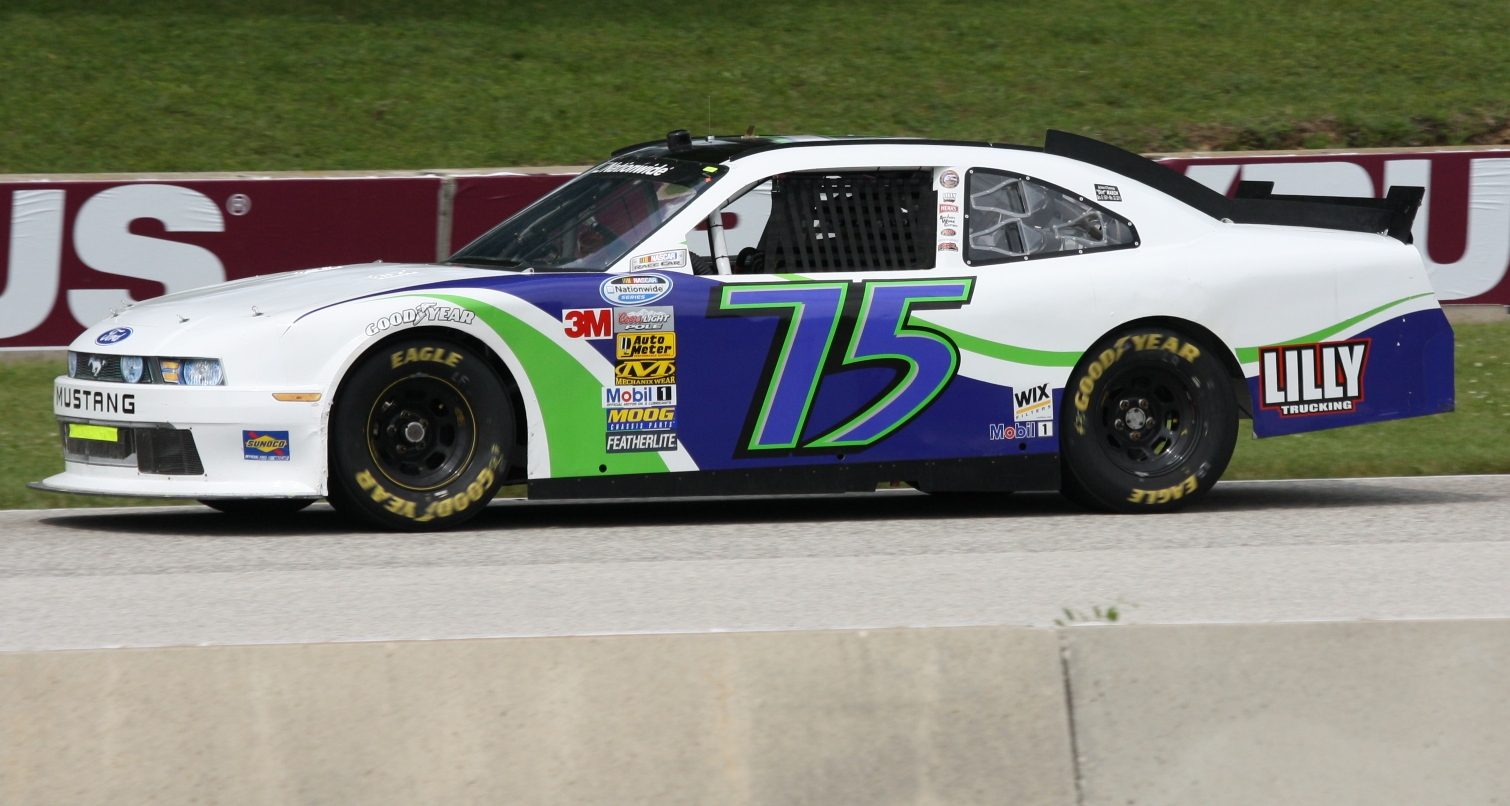
Carl Long in the No. 75 2011 at Road America in 2011

In 2011, RWR fielded the No. 75 car part-time for multiple drivers such as Carl Long, Johnny Chapman, Andy Ponstein, Tomy Drissi.

In 2012, the No. 75 car made another part-time season with multiple drivers such as Scott Riggs, Blake Koch, Michael Guerity, Matt Carter, Carl Long, and Timmy Hill.

==== Car No. 75 results ====
Year	Driver	No.	Make	1	2	3	4	5	6	7	8	9	10	11	12	13	14	15	16	17	18	19	20	21	22	23	24	25	26	27	28	29	30	31	32	33	34	Owners	Pts
2011	Carl Long	75	Ford	DAY	PHO	LVS	BRI	CAL	TEX; 42	TAL						CLT; 39			ROA; 36	DAY								BRI; DNQ	ATL; 41	RCH; 37	CHI; 37	DOV; 34	KAN; 37	CLT; DNQ	TEX; 37	PHO; DNQ			
2011	Johnny Chapman	75	Ford								NSH; 43	RCH; 39	DAR; 37	DOV; Wth	IOW; 36		CHI; 38							IRP; 37	IOW; 38												HOM; DNQ		
2011	Johnny Chapman	75	Chevy																		KEN; 39	NHA; 38	NSH; 36																
2011	Andy Ponstein	75	Ford															MCH; 38																					
2011	Tomy Drissi	75	Ford																							GLN; 27	CGV; 34												
2012	Scott Riggs	75	Chevy	DAY	PHO	LVS	BRI	CAL	TEX; 38			DAR; 38			DOV; 36	MCH; 37	ROA	KEN	DAY							BRI; 38	ATL	RCH; 36			DOV; 36	CLT; 40							
2012	Scott Riggs	75	Ford																																	HOM; DNQ			
2012	Blake Koch	75	Chevy							RCH; 39	TAL; DNQ																												
2012	Michael Guerity	75	Chevy										IOW; 39	CLT																									
2012	Matt Carter	75	Chevy																	NHA; 37	CHI	IND	IOW	GLN	CGV				CHI; 38	KEN; 40									
2012	Carl Long	75	Chevy																														KAN; 37						
2012	Carl Long	75	Ford																																PHO; DNQ				
2012	Timmy Hill	75	Ford																															TEX; 39					

=== Car No. 79 history ===
In 2009, RWR fielded the No. 79 car for Stanton Barrett at Kentucky.

==== Car No. 79 results ====
Year	Driver	No.	Make	1	2	3	4	5	6	7	8	9	10	11	12	13	14	15	16	17	18	19	20	21	22	23	24	25	26	27	28	29	30	31	32	33	34	35	Owners	Pts
2009	Stanton Barrett	79	Chevy	DAY	CAL	LVS	BRI	TEX	NSH	PHO	TAL	RCH	DAR	CLT	DOV	NSH	KEN; 43	MLW	NHA	DAY	CHI	GTW	IRP	IOW	GLN	MCH	BRI	CGV	ATL	RCH	DOV	KAN	CAL	CLT	MEM	TEX	PHO	HOM		

=== Car No. 87 history ===
In 2014, RWR fielded the No. 87 car using NEMCO Motorsports' owner points for multiple drivers such as Chris Cockrum, Stanton Barrett, Rubén García Jr., Carlos Contreras, Josh Reaume, Mike Harmon, Timmy Hill, Jennifer Jo Cobb, and Carl Long

==== Car No. 87 results ====
Year	Driver	No.	Make	1	2	3	4	5	6	7	8	9	10	11	12	13	14	15	16	17	18	19	20	21	22	23	24	25	26	27	28	29	30	31	32	33	Owners	Pts
2014	Chris Cockrum	87	Chevy	DAY	PHO	LVS	BRI	CAL	TEX	DAR	RCH	TAL	IOW	CLT; 35	DOV	MCH																						
2014	Chris Cockrum	87	Ford																								ATL; 29											
2014	Stanton Barrett	87	Ford														ROA; 32							GLN; 18	MOH; 33													
2014	Rubén García Jr.	87	Chevy															KEN; 33																				
2014	Carlos Contreras	87	Chevy																DAY; 34															TEX; 38				
2014	Josh Reaume	87	Chevy																	NHA; 34	CHI; 33	IND; 33	IOW; 33						CHI; 37	KEN; 37	DOV; QL^{†}							
2014	Josh Reaume	87	Ford																									RCH; 33										
2014	Timmy Hill	87	Chevy																							BRI; 34							CLT; 34					
2014	Mike Harmon	87	Dodge																												DOV; 39							
2014	Jennifer Jo Cobb	87	Chevy																													KAN; 24						
2014	Carl Long	87	Ford																																PHO; 39	HOM		

=== Car No. 98 history ===
Ware Racing Enterprises made their NASCAR Busch Series debut in 1995 with Rick Ware behind the wheel of the No. 98 Chevrolet.

==== Car No. 98 results ====
Year	Driver	No.	Make	1	2	3	4	5	6	7	8	9	10	11	12	13	14	15	16	17	18	19	20	21	22	23	24	25	26	Owners	Pts
1995	Rick Ware	98	Chevy	DAY	CAR	RCH	ATL; 41	NSV	DAR	BRI	HCY	NHA	NZH	CLT	DOV	MYB	GLN	MLW	TAL	SBO	IRP	MCH	BRI	DAR	RCH	DOV	CLT; DNQ	CAR	HOM		

== Camping World Truck Series ==
Rick Ware Racing made its NASCAR debut in the Craftsman Truck Series. In 1999, RWR made two starts, one with Randy MacDonald and the other with driver-owner Rick Ware in trucks 51 and 81.

In 2000, the organization was set to run the entire season with two teams, the 51 and 81 when Rick Ware was injured in a head-on crash at California Speedway that resulted in a career-ending fractured vertebra to the neck. Ware moved into the ownership role to continue the team. Drivers Tom Boston, David Starr, Michael Dokken and Donnie Neuenberger finished out the twenty race schedule. Dokken produced an eighth-place finish at Loudon and led at Nazareth. Rick Ware finished a career-high of thirteenth at Texas.

For 2001, Brian Rose ran 15 races before heading off to Bobby Hamilton Racing. Nathan Buttke, Travis Clark, Dokken, Coy Gibbs, Donnie Neuenberger, Trent Owens, Jonathon Price, Sammy Ragan, Michael Ritch, Jerry Robertson, Brian Sockwell, Jason Thom and Rich Woodland Jr. completed the roster that watched Rick Ware Racing expand to a three and an occasional four race team with numbers 51, 71, 81, 91.

Dokken had a season-high of 11th at Nazareth, Rose finished twelfth at Fontana and many others finished in the top-twenty with laps being led by Dokken and Ritch for the season.

In 2002, Rick Ware Racing switched to Dodge and fielded the 5, 51 and 81 entries for several drivers. Lance Hooper ran the most races for the team with a total of twelve events. Randy Briggs, Mike Cofer, Michael Dokken, Jason Hedlesky, Ryan Hemphill, Scott Kirkpatrick, Scott Kuhn, Carl Long, Blake Mallory, Donny Morelock, Donnie Neuenberger, Jonathon Price, Michael Ritch, Brian Rose, Morgan Shepherd, Jason Thom, Andy Thurman, Jason White and Angie Wilson all competed for the team. Most drivers finished in the top 15 with Hooper leading a lap at Darlington.

During the 2003 NASCAR Craftsman Truck Series season, Rick Ware Racing decided to focus on one driver for a full season. Jerry Hill was slated for the task. Hill competed in 22 of the 25 events and finished 18th in the drivers' standings in the No. 5 Dodge. Ware also raced the number 51 and 81 with a number of drivers such as Rusty Alton, Stan Boyd, Randy Briggs, Doug Keller, Carl Long, Blake Mallory, G. J. Mennen Jr., Chase Montgomery and Brian Sockwell.

After taking a leave from the series, Ware returned to the newly named NASCAR Camping World Truck Series for just two races in 2009 while competing in the Nationwide Series full-time. Chrissy Wallace in the No. 08 for Ware competed against her father, Mike Wallace, as it marked the first time a father and daughter raced in the same event in any of the top three NASCAR Series'. Chrissy finished in front of her father in the thirteenth position, marking the second highest finish by a female in NASCAR history.

Tim Brown, coming off his record-breaking 8th Championship at Bowman-Gray Stadium in the NASCAR Whelen Modified Series raced the truck at Martinsville as a celebration of their title earlier that month. RWR returned to the Truck Series with two full-time teams and an occasional third, using the 6, 47, and 16. Brett Butler competed in fifteen races for Rookie of the Year. Neuenberger finished 9th at Daytona as Butler finished eleventh. Bobby Hamilton Jr. qualified and finished tenth on two occasions each. Travis Kvapil along with Hamilton Jr. and Butler all led laps during the season. Amber Cope, Jeffrey Earnhardt, Ken Butler III, J. C. Stout, Brian Rose, Mike Guerity, C. E. Falk, Ryan Rust, Carl Long, Derek White, Lance Fenton, Clay Greenfield, Justin Hobgood and D. J. Kennington all drove the No. 6 for 2010 in mostly 1–2 race deals.

Jeffrey Earnhardt, the fourth generation driver of the Earnhardt family, made his series debut at Gateway. Amber Cope and Angela Cope, the twin daughters of Daytona 500 winner Derrike Cope, made their respective debuts at Martinsville Speedway, as the two became the first twins to compete against each other.

For 2011, Jeffrey Earnhardt was to run for the Rookie of the Year title in the No. 1 Fuel Doctor Chevy. However, after only 3 races, the team was hit with the double tragedy of losing two crew members and Fuel Doctor announcing it could no longer sponsor RWR. Earnhardt was released from RWR after Fuel Doctor's announcement, but the two mended fences and raced again at Martinsville. However, Earnhardt was caught up in a crash running seventh with just 25 laps remaining. Bobby Hamilton Jr. raced the truck at Nashville and Carl Long and Dover before the team took a temporary break to focus on the Nationwide Series where Earnhardt would drive select races in the No. 41 car.

The Truck team would return in 2013 with multiple drivers. The program was revived in 2017, fielding the No. 12 Chevrolet Silverado for Spencer Boyd, Jordan Anderson, and Cody Ware. The No. 12 team failed to qualify the season opener at Daytona, with Boyd blowing up an engine during qualifying. The truck operation was dissolved after the fifth race of the season.

== Whelen Modified Tour ==
Rick Ware Racing joined the NASCAR Whelen Modified Tour in conjunction with Tim Brown Motorsports. Brown and Ware's relationship dates back to the '90s when Ware made his own NASCAR Sprint Cup Series debut with the help of a young mechanic, Tim Brown. Ware promised the youngster that he would help his career once he got going but Brown needed little help.

In 2009, Brown and Ware struck a deal to partner together for his attempt at a historic 8th Championship at the famous Bowman-Gray Stadium, the oldest NASCAR sanctioned track, located in nearby Winston-Salem, NC. Brown won five races en route to the title and the first for Ware in the series in the No. 83 Circle K/Hayes Jewelers entry. The entire season was caught on film for the series, Madhouse featured on The History Channel.

As true to their word, Ware promised Brown a NASCAR Camping World Truck Series debut if he won the title. Tim Brown made his Truck Series debut at Martinsville Speedway where he finished 27th in the No. 08.

== Canada Series ==
In 2021, Rick Ware Racing made their Pinty's Series debut with Andrew Ranger as the full-time driver in the No. 51. Ware also fielded the No. 52 full-time for Alex Guenette.

The team earned their first victory in the series on September 12, at Flamboro Speedway, with Ranger behind the wheel. It was also the RWR's first victory at a NASCAR-sanctioned event.

RWR would return to the Canada Series in 2026 to field the No. 51 for D. J. Kennington. RWR will field two cars in 2027, the No. 15 and the No. 51.

== ARCA Menards Series ==
=== Car No. 10 history ===
In 2015, the team fielded the No. 10 Chevrolet for Garrett Smithley at Daytona. He finished 34th because of engine problems.

==== Car No. 10 results ====
Year	Driver	No.	Make	1	2	3	4	5	6	7	8	9	10	11	12	13	14	15	16	17	18	19	20	Owners	Pts
2015	Garrett Smithley	10	Chevy	DAY; 34	MOB	NSH	SLM	TAL	TOL	NJE	POC	MCH	CHI	WIN	IOW	IRP	POC	BLN	ISF	DSF	SLM	KEN	KAN		

=== Car No. 47 history ===
In 2010, Rick Ware Racing fielded the No. 47 Chevrolet part-time in ARCA for Timmy Hill.

==== Car No. 47 results ====
Year	Driver	No.	Make	1	2	3	4	5	6	7	8	9	10	11	12	13	14	15	16	17	18	19	20	Owners	Pts
2010	Timmy Hill	47	Chevy	DAY	PBE	SLM; 19	TEX	TAL	TOL	POC	MCH	IOW; 19	MFD	POC	CAR	BLN	NJE	ISF	CHI	DSF	TOL	SLM	KAN		

=== Car No. 51 history ===
In 2019, Rick Ware Racing partnered with Venturini Motorsports to field the No. 51 Toyota for Carson Ware at Kansas.

In 2025, they would field the No. 51 Chevrolet for Carson at Bristol Motor Speedway in the ARCA/ARCA East combination race.

In 2026, the team would field the No. 51 for Patrick Staropoli at Watkins Glen.

==== Car No. 51 results ====
Year	Driver	No.	Make	1	2	3	4	5	6	7	8	9	10	11	12	13	14	15	16	17	18	19	20	Owners	Pts
2019	Carson Ware	51	Toyota	DAY	FIF	SLM	TAL	NSH	TOL	CLT	POC	MCH	MAD	GTW	CHI	ELK	IOW	POC	ISF	DSF	SLM	IRP	KAN; 13		
2025	Carson Ware	51	Chevy	DAY	PHO	TAL	KAN	CLT	MCH	BLN	ELK	LRP	DOV	IRP	IOW	GLN	ISF	MAD	DSF	BRI; 15	SLM	KAN	TOL	62nd	29
2026	Patrick Staropoli	51	Chevy	DAY	PHO	KAN	TAL	GLN; 22	TOL	MCH	POC	BER	ELK	CHI	LRP	IRP	IOW	ISF	MAD	DSF	SLM	BRI	KAN	73rd	22

=== Car No. 98 history ===
In 1995, the team made their debut in ARCA series. They fielded No. 98 Ford for Rick Ware at Atlanta.

==== Car No. 98 results ====
Year	Driver	No.	Make	1	2	3	4	5	6	7	8	9	10	11	12	13	14	15	16	17	18	19	20	21	Owners	Pts
1995	Rick Ware	98	Ford	DAY	ATL	TAL	FIF	KIL	FRS	MCH	I80	MCS	FRS	POC	POC	KIL	FRS	SBS	LVL	ISF	DSF	SLM	WIN	ATL; 9		

== ARCA Menards Series East ==
=== Car No. 51 history ===
In 2025, the team would field the No. 51 Chevrolet for Carson Ware at Bristol Motor Speedway in the ARCA/ARCA East combination race.

==== Car No. 51 results ====
Year	Driver	No.	Make	1	2	3	4	5	6	7	8	Owners	Pts
2025	Carson Ware	51	Chevy	FIF	CAR	NSV	FRS	DOV	IRP	IOW	BRI; 15		

=== Car No. 99 history ===
In 2010, RWR fielded the No. 99 chevrolet for Timmy Hill at New Hampshire.

==== Car No. 99 results ====
Year	Driver	No.	Make	1	2	3	4	5	6	7	8	9	10	Owners	Pts
2010	Timmy Hill	99	Chevy	GRE	SBO	IOW	MAR	NHA	LRP	LEE	JFC	NHA; 10	DOV		

== K&N Pro Series West ==
=== Car No. 51 history ===
In 1998, the team made their debut in the West Series. They fielded No. 51 Pontiac for Rick Ware at Las Vegas.

In 1999, Ware returned to drive the No. 51 for nine races.

==== Car No. 51 results ====
Year	Driver	No.	Make	1	2	3	4	5	6	7	8	9	10	11	12	13	14	Owners	Pts
1998	Rick Ware	51	Pontiac	TUS	LVS	PHO	CAL	HPT	MMR	AMP	POR	CAL	PPR	EVG	SON	MMR	LVS; 14		121
1999	Rick Ware	51	Pontiac	TUS; 28	LVS; 22	PHO; 16	CAL; 34	PPR; 13	MMR; 16	IRW; 14	EVG; 15	POR	IRW	RMR	LVS; 21	MMR	MOT		930

=== Car No. 99 history ===
In 2010, RWR fielded the No. 99 Chevrolet for Timmy Hill at Irwindale and Phoenix.

==== Car No. 99 results ====
Year	Driver	No.	Make	1	2	3	4	5	6	7	8	9	10	11	12	Owners	Pts
2010	Timmy Hill	99	Chevy	AAS	PHO	IOW	DCS	SON	IRW; 7	PIR	MRP	CNS	MMP	AAS	PHO; 30		

== IndyCar Series ==
In 2020, Rick Ware Racing partnered with Dale Coyne Racing to field James Davison in the No. 51 Jacob Construction Honda for the 2020 Indy 500. The car finished in 33rd after catching fire on lap six.

In 2021, They partnered again with Coyne to field the No. 51 Nurtec ODT Honda full-time. Romain Grosjean participated in all street and road course events, with his only oval race being Gateway. Instead, Grosjean's Haas F1 Team colleague Pietro Fittipaldi raced in the oval races. They also fielded the #52 Honda for Cody Ware at Road America.

In 2022, two-time Indianapolis 500 winner Takuma Sato drove the No. 51 Honda full-time.

In 2023, Sting Ray Robb drove the No. 51 Honda full-time.

In 2024, several drivers drove the No. 51 Honda. Colin Braun at Thermal Club, Nolan Siegel at Long Beach, Luca Ghiotto at Barber, the IMS Road Course, Road America and Laguna Seca. Katherine Legge drove the 51 the most including at the 2024 Indianapolis 500, both Iowa races, St. Louis, both Milwaukee races and Nashville. Toby Sowery drove the 51 at Mid-Ohio, Toronto and Portland while Tristan Vautier piloted the entry at Detroit. Following the 2024 season, this would mark the end of Rick Ware and Dale Coyne Racing's partnership.

=== Racing results ===
(key)

Year	Chassis	Engine	Drivers	No.	1	2	3	4	5	6	7	8	9	10	11	12	13	14	15	16	17	18	Pos.	Pts.
Dale Coyne Racing with Rick Ware Racing & Byrd Belardi
2020					TXS	IMS	ROA		IOW		INDY	GAT		MOH		IMS		STP						
2020	Dallara DW12	Honda HI20TT V6t	(Australia) James Davison R	51							33												34th	10
Dale Coyne Racing with Rick Ware Racing
2021					ALA	STP	TXS		IMS	INDY	DET		ROA	MOH	NSH	IMS	GTW	POR	LAG	LBH				
2021	Dallara DW12	Honda HI21TT V6t	(France) Romain Grosjean R	51	10	13			2*		23	24	5	7	16	2	14	22	3	24			15th	272
2021	Dallara DW12	Honda HI21TT V6t	(Brazil) Pietro Fittipaldi	51			15	21		25													32nd	34
2021	Dallara DW12	Honda HI21TT V6t	(United States) Cody Ware R	52									19		20	25							34th	26
2021	Dallara DW12	Honda HI21TT V6t	(United States) Ryan Norman R	52										20									39th	10
2022					STP	TXS	LBH	ALA	IMS	INDY	DET	ROA	MOH	TOR	IOW		IMS	NSH	GTW	POR	LAG			
2022	Dallara DW12	Honda HI22TT V6t	(Japan) Takuma Sato	51	10	20	16	13	8	25	13	15	14	25	21	10	15	21	5	18	23		19th	258
2023					STP	TXS	LBH	ALA	IMS	INDY	DET	ROA	MOH	TOR	IOW		NSH	IMS	GTW	POR	LAG			
2023	Dallara DW12	Honda HI23TT V6t	(United States) Sting Ray Robb R	51	16	25	18	27	27	31	22	22	22	19	25	28	17	22	21	23	12		23rd	147
2024					STP	THE	LBH	ALA	IMS	INDY	DET	ROA	LAG	MOH	IOW		TOR	GTW	POR	MIL		NSH		
2024	Dallara DW12	Honda HI24TT V6t	(United States) Colin Braun R	51	20	DNQ																		
2024	Dallara DW12	Honda HI24TT V6t	(United States) Nolan Siegel R	51			20																	
2024	Dallara DW12	Honda HI24TT V6t	(Italy) Luca Ghiotto R	51				21	25			22	27											
2024	Dallara DW12	Honda HI24TT V6t	(United Kingdom) Katherine Legge	51						29					17	24		27		19	15	26		
2024	Dallara DW12	Honda HI24TT V6t	(France) Tristan Vautier	51							18													
2024	Dallara DW12	Honda HI24TT V6t	(United Kingdom) Toby Sowery R	51										13			15		17					

* Season still in progress

== Sports car racing ==
=== Rolex Sports Car Series ===
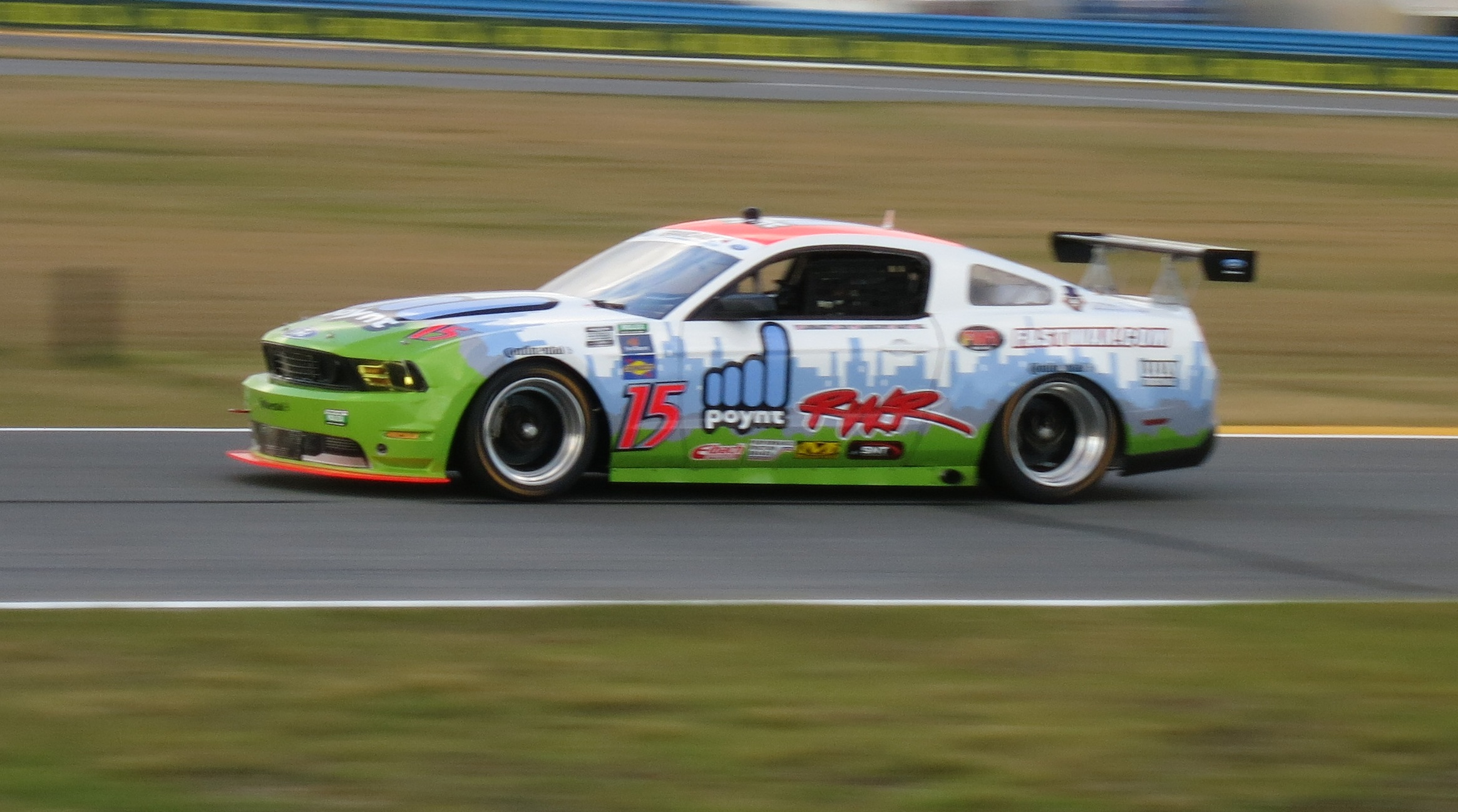
RWR's 2012 24 Hours of Daytona car

Rick Ware Racing returned to its roots of road racing as it did with Ware & Sons in the 1980s for the running of the Grand-Am Rolex 24 Hours of Daytona in 2011.

RWR competed in the GT3 Cup Division at Daytona International Speedway for the historic Rolex 24 Hours of Daytona and finished eleventh in class and 25th overall with drivers, Brett Sandberg, Scott Monroe, Maurice Hull, Jeffrey Earnhardt and Doug Harrington.

The event marked the 10th anniversary of Jeffrey Earnhardt's grandfather, Dale Earnhardt and uncle Dale Earnhardt Jr.'s run in the same event.

Fuel Doctor was the primary of the No. 47 Porsche.

=== Asian Le Mans ===
In 2019, RWR began competing in the Asian Le Mans Series, fielding two Ligier JS P2s in the LMPS Am class for Cody Ware and Mark Kvamme. In their first race at Shanghai International Circuit, the team missed qualifying and much of practice as their cars were plagued by shipping delays; to ensure their cars would be up to par, the team formed a partnership with ARC Bratislava. Although the No. 25 was unable to compete in the race, Ware and Kvappe drove the No. 52 to a fourteenth-overall finish and second place in their class. At The Bend Motorsport Park, the team scored the LMP2 Am Trophy class win as they finished fifth overall with Ware and Gustas Grinbergas; at sixteen years of age, Grinbergas became the youngest driver to win an Automobile Club de l'Ouest (ACO)-sanctioned race.

=== IMSA Weathertech SportsCar Championship ===
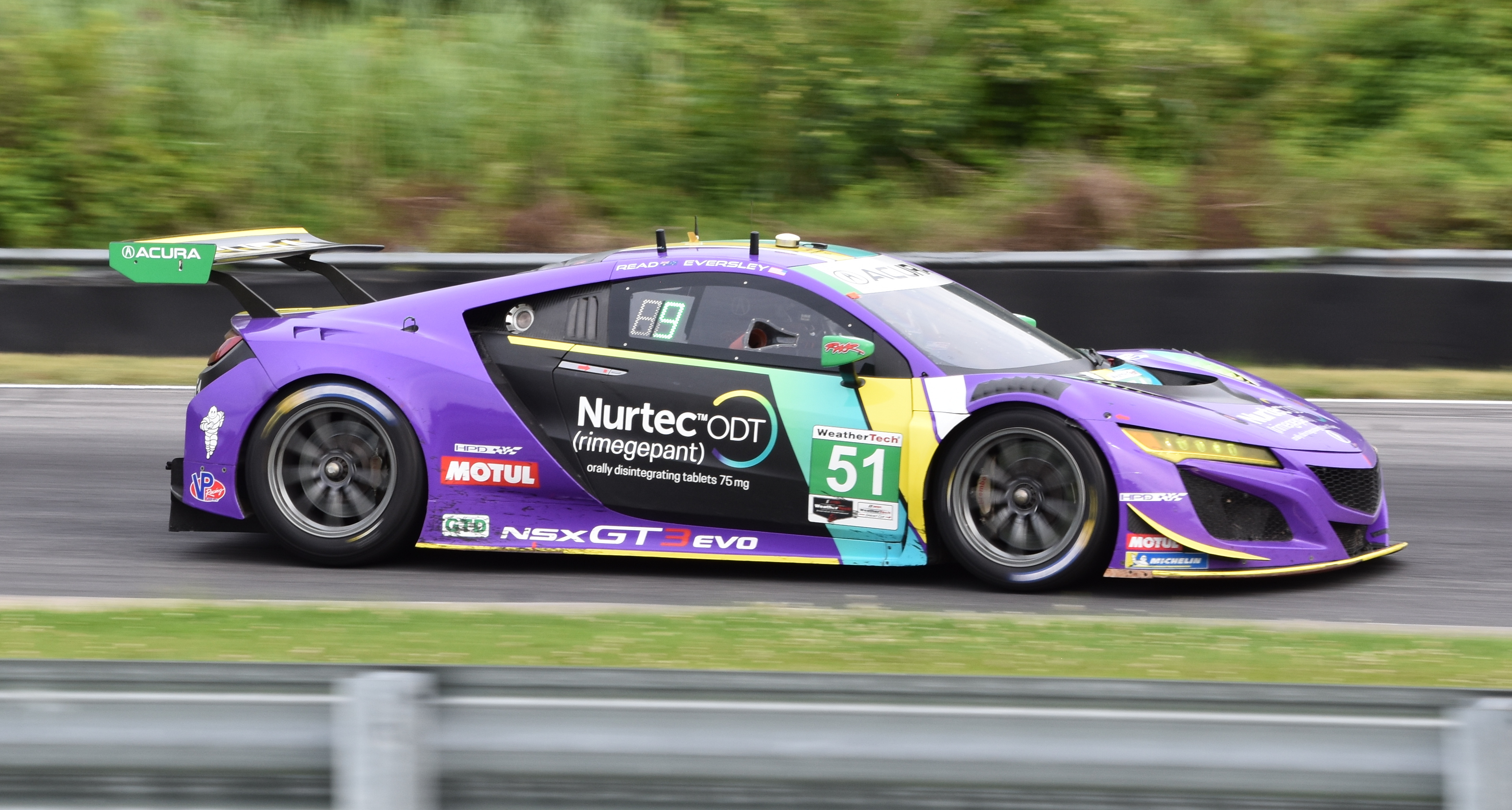
RWR's 2022 Northeast Grand Prix car

In August 2019, RWR announced that they will be entering the IMSA WeatherTech SportsCar Championship for the 2020 season with an updated Riley Mk. 30 in the PRO/AM LMP2 class.

In 2021, RWR formed alliance with Eurasia Motorsport to field the No. 51 Nurtec ODT Ligier for the 24 Hours of Daytona LMP2 class with drivers Cody Ware, Austin Dillon, Sven Müller, and Salih Yoluç.

In 2022, RWR fielded the No. 51 Nurtec ODT Acura in the GTD class for Ryan Eversley and Aidan Read.

In 2023, RWR terminated the GTD program and moved onto fielding an Oreca 07 in the LMP2 class full time, with Eric Lux, Pietro Fittipaldi, and Devlin DeFrancesco as drivers, with Austin Cindric racing the 24 Hours of Daytona. Juan Pablo Montoya had also been announced to be in the car for the rounds at Laguna Seca, Road America, and Indianapolis Motor Speedway. After a DNF at Watkins Glen caused by wheel hub problem, the team did not enter any more races in the 2023 season, despite their plans to run the full season. The reasons for this are currently unknown to the public, and they have not announced any plans for IMSA in 2024.

=== IMSA VP Racing SportsCar Challenge ===
In 2024, RWR fielded the No. 51 in the LMP3 class in the VP Racing SportsCar Challenge and the Roar before the 24 with Cody Ware behind the wheel.

== Motorcycle racing ==
=== AMA Arenacross Series ===
RWR with Tuf Honda with sponsorship from Bad Boy Power Drinks and Mahindra Tractors won the championship in 2007 with rider Danny Smith. In 2008, Chad Johnson won the organization's second title in a row, and in 2009, rider Jeff Gibson made it a record three championships consecutively.

Tuf Honda with Dave Antolak has a total of 5 Championships, the most in the series history with three of those titles coming in partnership with Rick Ware Racing

=== AMA Supercross Series ===
Rick Ware Racing dates back in the Supercross to 1986 when the owner first raced in the series. In 2007, Ware focused on putting together a team in his return that would compete with factory teams, yet remain a small independent. Brock Sellards, Tyler Bright, Jeff Dement and Tyson Hadsell completed the team under the Yamaha flagship alongside Bad Boy Power Drinks and Pro30.

Tyler Bright captured a holeshot award at Detroit (1) in the Superlites and Jeff Dement captured a holeshot award at Phoenix.

In 2008, Jake Marsack joined the organization and success followed. Marsack finished 4th at San Francisco, just one spot from the podium, and on a muddy evening in Daytona, Jake Marsack raced his way through the mud to a 3rd-place finish on the podium, marking the first time in modern-day history that an independent team finished that high.

=== AMA Motocross Series ===
RWR completed the three major series in AMA with the addition of the Motocross Series in 2007. Riders Tyler Bright, Tyson Hadsell and Jake Marsack raced for Ware on Yamaha's with Bad Boy Power Drinks and Pro30 on board.

The team came back in 2008 and made several main events but trouble kept them from competing with the bigger budget teams in the series.

In 2009, Ware went to a single rider team with Tyler Bright on a Honda with Mahindra Tractors on board in sponsorship.

=== WMA Motocross Series ===
Few teams have scored as much success in the WMA Motocross Series, a motocross series for female riders, as Rick Ware Racing. With Bad Boy Power Drinks and Pro30 in sponsorship, Jessica Patterson, made history on her Honda bike for the organization.

In 2006, Patterson captured her third title in the series and first for RWR. Patterson backed that title up in 2007 with Ware, becoming the most successful female rider in AMA Motocross history. During the two years with RWR, Patterson captured 10 holeshot awards and 13 victories, never failing to make a podium during the two-year stint.

Ware went in a different direction after the 2007 season to focus more on the NASCAR, Motocross, and X-Games Series, after making his mark in the history books in the WMA Series

=== X Games ===
Rick Ware Racing became interested in the crowd and excitement surrounding the X Games since its inception. In 2009, RWR finally took the step into the events with Women's Motocross rider, Sherri Cruse for X-Games 15.

Cruse had captured the bronze medal in 2008 was highly favored in the event. With Circle K and Fastwax on board, Cruse stumbled early in the event and charged from last place to fourth in the shorted race due to a television schedule.

Ware had faith in Cruse and went back to X-Games 15 in 2010 for the same event. Cruse had suffered an injury just weeks before the event and still completed the event after falling during the race. Cruse finished eighth.

RWR returned to the X Games in 2011 with a new rider in the Women's Moto X, Vicki Golden. Golden had competed with RWR and Tuf Honda during the 2011 AMA Arenacross Series and gave her the nod for X Games 17. Vicki Golden grabbed the holeshot for the event and went on to win gold for the organizations first gold medal in the X Games.

== Allison Legacy Series ==
In 2012, Rick Ware Racing joined the Allison Legacy Series with Tyler Hill, the brother of Timmy Hill. Hill won the U.S. National Championship in 2009 and set a record of ten wins in a season. His brother Tyler Hill won the championship in 2011 after winning thirteen of eighteen races.
