= 2020 Pocono 350 =

NASCAR Cup Series race

Race details
- Race 15 of 36 in the 2020 NASCAR Cup Series
- 2020 Pocono 350 program cover
- Date: June 28, 2020
- Location: Pocono Raceway in Long Pond, Pennsylvania
- Course: Permanent racing facility
- Course length: 4 km (2.5 miles)
- Distance: 140 laps, 350 mi (563 km)
- Average speed: 122.879 miles per hour (197.755 km/h)

Pole position
Driver	Ryan Preece	JTG Daugherty Racing
- Grid positions set by partial inversion of previous race's finishing order

Most laps led
Driver	Denny Hamlin	Joe Gibbs Racing
- Laps: 49

Winner
No. 11	Denny Hamlin	Joe Gibbs Racing

Television in the United States
- Network: FS1
- Announcers: Mike Joy and Jeff Gordon
- Nielsen ratings: 2.660 million

Radio in the United States
- Radio: MRN
- Booth announcers: Alex Hayden and Jeff Striegle
- Turn announcers: Dave Moody (1), Mike Bagley (2) and Kurt Becker (3)

The 2020 Pocono 350 was a NASCAR Cup Series race held on June 28, 2020 at Pocono Raceway in Long Pond, Pennsylvania. Contested over 140 laps on the 2.5-mile (4.0 km) triangular racecourse, it was the 15th race of the 2020 NASCAR Cup Series season.

== Entry list ==
- (R) denotes rookie driver.
- (i) denotes driver who are ineligible for series driver points.

No.	Driver	Team	Manufacturer
00	Quin Houff (R)	StarCom Racing	Chevrolet
1	Kurt Busch	Chip Ganassi Racing	Chevrolet
2	Brad Keselowski	Team Penske	Ford
3	Austin Dillon	Richard Childress Racing	Chevrolet
4	Kevin Harvick	Stewart-Haas Racing	Ford
6	Ryan Newman	Roush Fenway Racing	Ford
7	Josh Bilicki (i)	Tommy Baldwin Racing	Chevrolet
8	Tyler Reddick (R)	Richard Childress Racing	Chevrolet
9	Chase Elliott	Hendrick Motorsports	Chevrolet
10	Aric Almirola	Stewart-Haas Racing	Ford
11	Denny Hamlin	Joe Gibbs Racing	Toyota
12	Ryan Blaney	Team Penske	Ford
13	Ty Dillon	Germain Racing	Chevrolet
14	Clint Bowyer	Stewart-Haas Racing	Ford
15	Brennan Poole (R)	Premium Motorsports	Chevrolet
17	Chris Buescher	Roush Fenway Racing	Ford
18	Kyle Busch	Joe Gibbs Racing	Toyota
19	Martin Truex Jr.	Joe Gibbs Racing	Toyota
20	Erik Jones	Joe Gibbs Racing	Toyota
21	Matt DiBenedetto	Wood Brothers Racing	Ford
22	Joey Logano	Team Penske	Ford
24	William Byron	Hendrick Motorsports	Chevrolet
27	J. J. Yeley (i)	Rick Ware Racing	Ford
32	Corey LaJoie	Go Fas Racing	Ford
34	Michael McDowell	Front Row Motorsports	Ford
37	Ryan Preece	JTG Daugherty Racing	Chevrolet
38	John Hunter Nemechek (R)	Front Row Motorsports	Ford
41	Cole Custer (R)	Stewart-Haas Racing	Ford
42	Matt Kenseth	Chip Ganassi Racing	Chevrolet
43	Bubba Wallace	Richard Petty Motorsports	Chevrolet
47	Ricky Stenhouse Jr.	JTG Daugherty Racing	Chevrolet
48	Jimmie Johnson	Hendrick Motorsports	Chevrolet
51	Joey Gase (i)	Petty Ware Racing	Ford
53	Garrett Smithley (i)	Rick Ware Racing	Chevrolet
66	Timmy Hill (i)	MBM Motorsports	Toyota
77	James Davison	Spire Motorsports	Chevrolet
78	B. J. McLeod (i)	B. J. McLeod Motorsports	Chevrolet
88	Alex Bowman	Hendrick Motorsports	Chevrolet
95	Christopher Bell (R)	Leavine Family Racing	Toyota
96	Daniel Suárez	Gaunt Brothers Racing	Toyota
Official entry list

== Qualifying ==
Ryan Preece was awarded the pole for the race as determined by the top 20 from Saturday's finishing order inverted.

=== Starting Lineup ===
Pos	No.	Driver	Team	Manufacturer
1	37	Ryan Preece	JTG Daugherty Racing	Chevrolet
2	3	Austin Dillon	Richard Childress Racing	Chevrolet
3	1	Kurt Busch	Chip Ganassi Racing	Chevrolet
4	47	Ricky Stenhouse Jr.	JTG Daugherty Racing	Chevrolet
5	41	Cole Custer (R)	Stewart-Haas Racing	Ford
6	6	Ryan Newman	Roush Fenway Racing	Ford
7	24	William Byron	Hendrick Motorsports	Chevrolet
8	21	Matt DiBenedetto	Wood Brothers Racing	Ford
9	12	Ryan Blaney	Team Penske	Ford
10	42	Matt Kenseth	Chip Ganassi Racing	Chevrolet
11	17	Chris Buescher	Roush Fenway Racing	Ford
12	2	Brad Keselowski	Team Penske	Ford
13	34	Michael McDowell	Front Row Motorsports	Ford
14	14	Clint Bowyer	Stewart-Haas Racing	Ford
15	19	Martin Truex Jr.	Joe Gibbs Racing	Toyota
16	18	Kyle Busch	Joe Gibbs Racing	Toyota
17	95	Christopher Bell (R)	Leavine Family Racing	Toyota
18	10	Aric Almirola	Stewart-Haas Racing	Ford
19	11	Denny Hamlin	Joe Gibbs Racing	Toyota
20	4	Kevin Harvick	Stewart-Haas Racing	Ford
21	48	Jimmie Johnson	Hendrick Motorsports	Chevrolet
22	43	Bubba Wallace	Richard Petty Motorsports	Chevrolet
23	32	Corey LaJoie	Go Fas Racing	Ford
24	38	John Hunter Nemechek (R)	Front Row Motorsports	Ford
25	9	Chase Elliott	Hendrick Motorsports	Chevrolet
26	13	Ty Dillon	Germain Racing	Chevrolet
27	88	Alex Bowman	Hendrick Motorsports	Chevrolet
28	96	Daniel Suárez	Gaunt Brothers Racing	Toyota
29	15	Brennan Poole (R)	Premium Motorsports	Chevrolet
30	8	Tyler Reddick (R)	Richard Childress Racing	Chevrolet
31	27	J. J. Yeley (i)	Rick Ware Racing	Ford
32	7	Josh Bilicki (i)	Tommy Baldwin Racing	Chevrolet
33	53	Garrett Smithley (i)	Rick Ware Racing	Chevrolet
34	77	James Davison	Spire Motorsports	Chevrolet
35	66	Timmy Hill (i)	MBM Motorsports	Toyota
36	22	Joey Logano	Team Penske	Ford
37	51	Joey Gase (i)	Petty Ware Racing	Ford
38	20	Erik Jones	Joe Gibbs Racing	Toyota
39	78	B. J. McLeod (i)	B. J. McLeod Motorsports	Chevrolet
40	00	Quin Houff (R)	StarCom Racing	Chevrolet
Official starting lineup

== Race ==
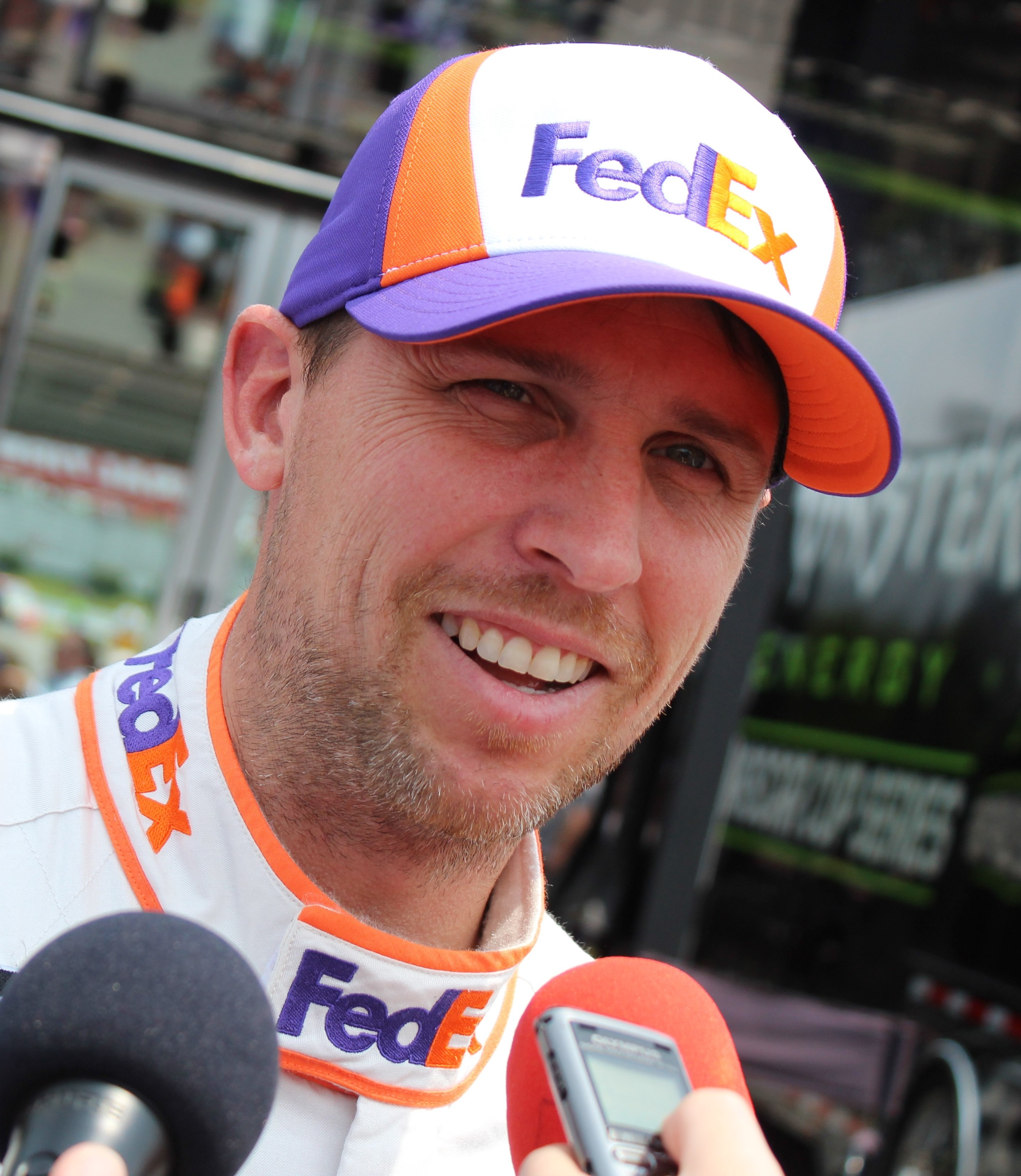
Denny Hamlin won the race.

=== Stage Results ===
Stage One Laps: 30

Pos	No	Driver	Team	Manufacturer	Points
1	1	Kurt Busch	Chip Ganassi Racing	Chevrolet	10
2	12	Ryan Blaney	Team Penske	Ford	9
3	95	Christopher Bell (R)	Leavine Family Racing	Toyota	8
4	4	Kevin Harvick	Stewart-Haas Racing	Ford	7
5	2	Brad Keselowski	Team Penske	Ford	6
6	21	Matt DiBenedetto	Wood Brothers Racing	Ford	5
7	17	Chris Buescher	Roush Fenway Racing	Ford	4
8	19	Martin Truex Jr.	Joe Gibbs Racing	Toyota	3
9	18	Kyle Busch	Joe Gibbs Racing	Toyota	2
10	41	Cole Custer (R)	Stewart-Haas Racing	Ford	1
Official stage one results

Stage Two Laps: 55

Pos	No	Driver	Team	Manufacturer	Points
1	2	Brad Keselowski	Team Penske	Ford	10
2	10	Aric Almirola	Stewart-Haas Racing	Ford	9
3	6	Ryan Newman	Roush Fenway Racing	Ford	8
4	19	Martin Truex Jr.	Joe Gibbs Racing	Toyota	7
5	47	Ricky Stenhouse Jr.	JTG Daugherty Racing	Chevrolet	6
6	4	Kevin Harvick	Stewart-Haas Racing	Ford	5
7	3	Austin Dillon	Richard Childress Racing	Chevrolet	4
8	1	Kurt Busch	Chip Ganassi Racing	Chevrolet	3
9	21	Matt DiBenedetto	Wood Brothers Racing	Ford	2
10	11	Denny Hamlin	Joe Gibbs Racing	Toyota	1
Official stage two results

=== Final Stage Results ===
Stage Three Laps: 55

Pos	Grid	No	Driver	Team	Manufacturer	Laps	Points
1	19	11	Denny Hamlin	Joe Gibbs Racing	Toyota	140	41
2	20	4	Kevin Harvick	Stewart-Haas Racing	Ford	140	47
3	38	20	Erik Jones	Joe Gibbs Racing	Toyota	140	34
4	25	9	Chase Elliott	Hendrick Motorsports	Chevrolet	140	33
5	18	10	Aric Almirola	Stewart-Haas Racing	Ford	140	41
6	8	21	Matt DiBenedetto	Wood Brothers Racing	Ford	140	38
7	7	24	William Byron	Hendrick Motorsports	Chevrolet	140	30
8	14	14	Clint Bowyer	Stewart-Haas Racing	Ford	140	29
9	27	88	Alex Bowman	Hendrick Motorsports	Chevrolet	140	28
10	15	19	Martin Truex Jr.	Joe Gibbs Racing	Toyota	140	37
11	12	2	Brad Keselowski	Team Penske	Ford	140	42
12	10	42	Matt Kenseth	Chip Ganassi Racing	Chevrolet	140	25
13	3	1	Kurt Busch	Chip Ganassi Racing	Chevrolet	140	37
14	2	3	Austin Dillon	Richard Childress Racing	Chevrolet	140	27
15	4	47	Ricky Stenhouse Jr.	JTG Daugherty Racing	Chevrolet	140	28
16	21	48	Jimmie Johnson	Hendrick Motorsports	Chevrolet	140	21
17	5	41	Cole Custer (R)	Stewart-Haas Racing	Ford	140	21
18	6	6	Ryan Newman	Roush Fenway Racing	Ford	139	27
19	24	38	John Hunter Nemechek (R)	Front Row Motorsports	Ford	139	18
20	22	43	Bubba Wallace	Richard Petty Motorsports	Chevrolet	139	17
21	23	32	Corey LaJoie	Go Fas Racing	Ford	139	16
22	9	12	Ryan Blaney	Team Penske	Ford	139	24
23	26	13	Ty Dillon	Germain Racing	Chevrolet	139	14
24	36	22	Joey Logano	Team Penske	Ford	139	13
25	1	37	Ryan Preece	JTG Daugherty Racing	Chevrolet	139	12
26	28	96	Daniel Suárez	Gaunt Brothers Racing	Toyota	139	11
27	29	15	Brennan Poole (R)	Premium Motorsports	Chevrolet	138	10
28	31	27	J. J. Yeley (i)	Rick Ware Racing	Ford	138	0
29	35	66	Timmy Hill (i)	MBM Motorsports	Toyota	137	0
30	34	77	James Davison	Spire Motorsports	Chevrolet	136	7
31	40	00	Quin Houff (R)	StarCom Racing	Chevrolet	136	6
32	33	53	Garrett Smithley (i)	Rick Ware Racing	Chevrolet	136	0
33	37	51	Joey Gase (i)	Petty Ware Racing	Ford	136	0
34	32	7	Josh Bilicki (i)	Tommy Baldwin Racing	Chevrolet	136	0
35	30	8	Tyler Reddick (R)	Richard Childress Racing	Chevrolet	135	2
36	11	17	Chris Buescher	Roush Fenway Racing	Ford	135	5
37	39	78	B. J. McLeod (i)	B. J. McLeod Motorsports	Chevrolet	133	0
38	16	18	Kyle Busch	Joe Gibbs Racing	Toyota	74	3
39	17	95	Christopher Bell (R)	Leavine Family Racing	Toyota	39	9
40	13	34	Michael McDowell	Front Row Motorsports	Ford	15	1
Official race results

=== Race statistics ===
- Lead changes: 12 among 8 different drivers
- Cautions/Laps: 8 for 32
- Red flags: 1 for 50 minutes and 50 seconds
- Time of race: 2 hours, 50 minutes and 54 seconds
- Average speed: 122.879 miles per hour (197.755 km/h)

== Media ==
=== Television ===
Fox Sports televised the race in the United States on FS1. Mike Joy and six-time Pocono winner Jeff Gordon will cover the race from the Fox Sports studio in Charlotte. Jamie Little handled the pit road duties. Larry McReynolds provided insight from the Fox Sports studio in Charlotte.

FS1
Booth announcers	Pit reporter	In-race analyst
Lap-by-lap: Mike Joy; Color-commentator: Jeff Gordon	Jamie Little	Larry McReynolds

=== Radio ===
MRN had the radio call for the race which was also simulcast on Sirius XM NASCAR Radio. Alex Hayden, Jeff Striegle and Rusty Wallace called the race in the booth when the field raced through the tri-oval. Dave Moody called the race from the Sunoco spotters stand outside turn 2 when the field raced through turns 1 and 2. Mike Bagley called the race from a platform inside the backstretch when the field raced down the backstretch. Kurt Becker called the race from the Sunoco spotters stand outside turn 4 when the field raced through turns 3 and 4. Steve Post and Kim Coon worked pit road for the radio side.

MRN Radio
Booth announcers	Turn announcers	Pit reporters
Lead announcer: Alex Hayden; Announcer: Jeff Striegle	Turns 1 & 2: Dave Moody; Backstretch: Mike Bagley; Turns 3 & 4: Kurt Becker	Steve Post; Kim Coon

== Standings after the race ==
Drivers' Championship standings

	Pos	Driver	Points
	1	Kevin Harvick	581
	2	Ryan Blaney	529 (–52)
2	3	Brad Keselowski	514 (–67)
	4	Chase Elliott	510 (–71)
1	5	Denny Hamlin	506 (–75)
3	6	Joey Logano	500 (–81)
	7	Martin Truex Jr.	500 (–81)
	8	Alex Bowman	464 (–117)
2	9	Aric Almirola	431 (–150)
	10	Kurt Busch	430 (–151)
2	11	Kyle Busch	423 (–158)
	12	Jimmie Johnson	390 (–191)
	13	Clint Bowyer	387 (–194)
	14	Matt DiBenedetto	384 (–197)
	15	William Byron	372 (–209)
1	16	Erik Jones	341 (–240)
Official driver's standings

Manufacturers' Championship standings

Pos	Manufacturer	Points
1	Ford	559
2	Toyota	527 (–32)
3	Chevrolet	502 (–57)

- Note: Only the first 16 positions are included for the driver standings.
- . – Driver has clinched a position in the NASCAR Cup Series playoffs.

Previous race: 2020 Pocono Organics 325	NASCAR Cup Series; 2020 season	Next race: 2020 Brickyard 400
