= 2020 Brickyard 400 =

NASCAR Cup Series race

Race details
- Race 16 of 36 in the 2020 NASCAR Cup Series
- 2020 Brickyard 400 program cover
- Date: July 5, 2020
- Location: Indianapolis Motor Speedway in Speedway, Indiana
- Course: Permanent racing facility
- Course length: 2.5 miles (4 km)
- Distance: 161 laps, 402.5 mi (644 km)
- Scheduled distance: 160 laps, 400 mi (640 km)
- Average speed: 123.162 miles per hour (198.210 km/h)

Pole position
Driver	Joey Logano	Team Penske
- Grid positions set by ballot

Most laps led
Driver	Kevin Harvick	Stewart-Haas Racing
- Laps: 68

Winner
No. 4	Kevin Harvick	Stewart-Haas Racing

Television in the United States
- Network: NBC
- Announcers: Rick Allen, Jeff Burton, Steve Letarte and Dale Earnhardt Jr.
- Nielsen ratings: 4.343 million

Radio in the United States
- Radio: IndyCar Radio Network
- Booth announcers: Doug Rice, Pat Patterson and Jeff Hammond
- Turn announcers: Mark Jaynes (1), Nick Yeoman (2), Jake Query (3) and Chris Denari (4)

The 2020 Brickyard 400, branded as Big Machine Hand Sanitizer 400 Powered by Big Machine Records, is a NASCAR Cup Series race that was held on July 5, 2020, at Indianapolis Motor Speedway in Speedway, Indiana. It is the 27th running of the Brickyard 400. Contested over 161 laps—extended from 160 laps due to an overtime finish, on the 2.5-mile (4.0 km) speedway, it was the 16th race of the 2020 NASCAR Cup Series season.

The race was originally branded as the Big Machine Vodka 400 Powered by Florida Georgia Line, but was renamed due to Big Machine producing hand sanitizer in response to the COVID-19 pandemic.

This was the first NASCAR race without 4-time Brickyard 400 winner Jimmie Johnson since the 2001 New Hampshire 300.

== Report ==
=== Background ===
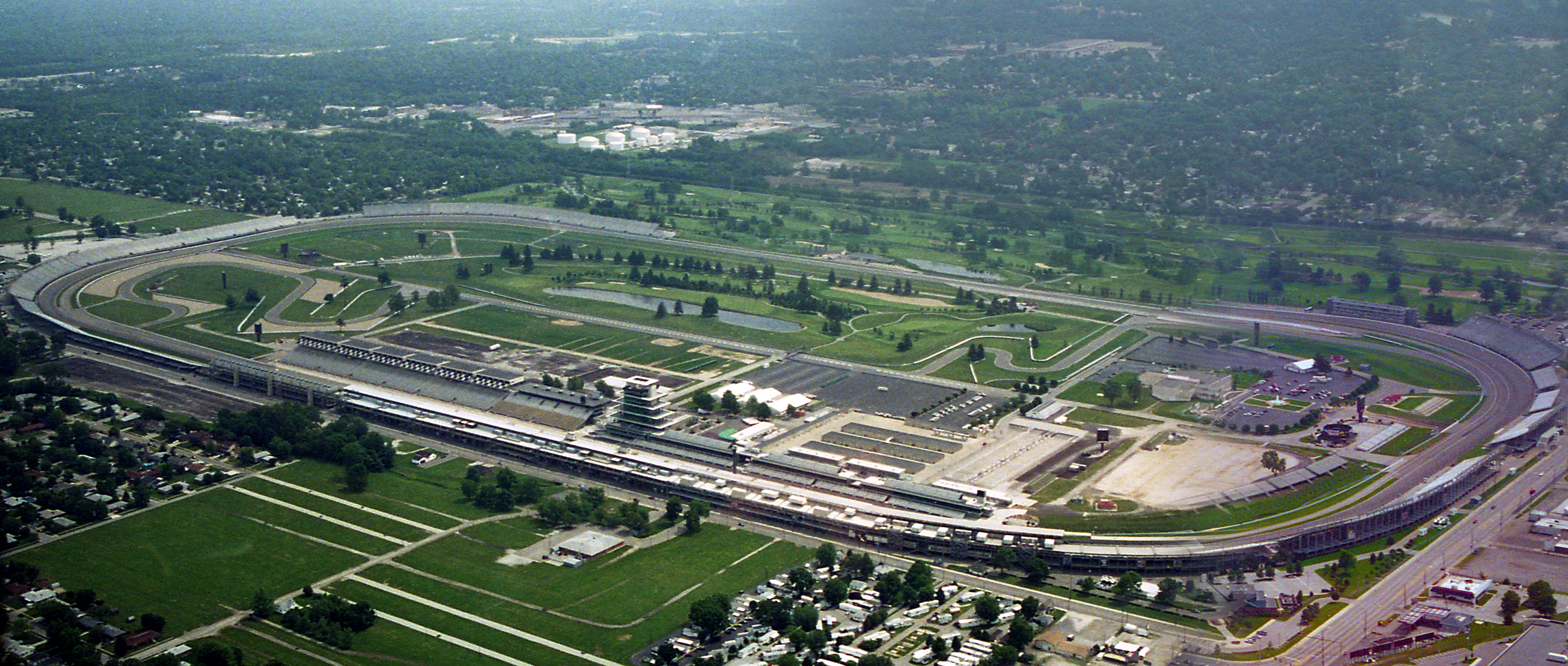
Indianapolis Motor Speedway, the track where the race was held.

The Indianapolis Motor Speedway, located in Speedway, Indiana, (an enclave suburb of Indianapolis) in the United States, is the home of the Indianapolis 500 and the Brickyard 400. It is located on the corner of 16th Street and Georgetown Road, approximately six miles (10 km) west of Downtown Indianapolis.

Constructed in 1909, it is the original speedway, the first racing facility so named. It has a permanent seating capacity estimated at 235,000 with infield seating raising capacity to an approximate 400,000. It is the highest-capacity sports venue in the world.

Considered relatively flat by American standards, the track is a 2.5-mile (4.0 km), nearly rectangular oval with dimensions that have remained essentially unchanged since its inception: four 0.25-mile (0.40 km) turns, two 0.625-mile-long (1.006 km) straightaways between the fourth and first turns and the second and third turns, and two .125-mile (0.201 km) short straightaways – termed "short chutes" – between the first and second, and third and fourth turns.

Due to postponements stemming from the COVID-19 pandemic, the 2020 edition of the Brickyard 400 became part of a double-header weekend, as the IndyCar Series moved their GMR Grand Prix to July 4, the day before 400. However, all races during the weekend were run with no fans in attendance.

In the lead up to the race, multi-time winner Jimmie Johnson announced he had tested positive for COVID-19 and was forced to withdraw. Justin Allgaier replaced Johnson for the weekend.

==== Entry list ====
- (R) denotes rookie driver.
- (i) denotes driver who are ineligible for series driver points.
- (W) denotes past winner of event

No.	Driver	Team	Manufacturer
00	Quin Houff (R)	StarCom Racing	Chevrolet
1	Kurt Busch	Chip Ganassi Racing	Chevrolet
2	Brad Keselowski (W)	Team Penske	Ford
3	Austin Dillon	Richard Childress Racing	Chevrolet
4	Kevin Harvick (W)	Stewart-Haas Racing	Ford
6	Ryan Newman (W)	Roush Fenway Racing	Ford
7	Josh Bilicki (i)	Tommy Baldwin Racing	Chevrolet
8	Tyler Reddick (R)	Richard Childress Racing	Chevrolet
9	Chase Elliott	Hendrick Motorsports	Chevrolet
10	Aric Almirola	Stewart-Haas Racing	Ford
11	Denny Hamlin	Joe Gibbs Racing	Toyota
12	Ryan Blaney	Team Penske	Ford
13	Ty Dillon	Germain Racing	Chevrolet
14	Clint Bowyer	Stewart-Haas Racing	Ford
15	Brennan Poole (R)	Premium Motorsports	Chevrolet
17	Chris Buescher	Roush Fenway Racing	Ford
18	Kyle Busch (W)	Joe Gibbs Racing	Toyota
19	Martin Truex Jr.	Joe Gibbs Racing	Toyota
20	Erik Jones	Joe Gibbs Racing	Toyota
21	Matt DiBenedetto	Wood Brothers Racing	Ford
22	Joey Logano	Team Penske	Ford
24	William Byron	Hendrick Motorsports	Chevrolet
27	J. J. Yeley (i)	Rick Ware Racing	Ford
32	Corey LaJoie	Go Fas Racing	Ford
34	Michael McDowell	Front Row Motorsports	Ford
37	Ryan Preece	JTG Daugherty Racing	Chevrolet
38	John Hunter Nemechek (R)	Front Row Motorsports	Ford
41	Cole Custer (R)	Stewart-Haas Racing	Ford
42	Matt Kenseth	Chip Ganassi Racing	Chevrolet
43	Bubba Wallace	Richard Petty Motorsports	Chevrolet
47	Ricky Stenhouse Jr.	JTG Daugherty Racing	Chevrolet
48	Justin Allgaier* (i)	Hendrick Motorsports	Chevrolet
51	Joey Gase (i)	Petty Ware Racing	Ford
53	Garrett Smithley (i)	Rick Ware Racing	Chevrolet
66	Timmy Hill (i)	MBM Motorsports	Toyota
77	Ross Chastain (i)	Spire Motorsports	Chevrolet
78	B. J. McLeod (i)	B. J. McLeod Motorsports	Chevrolet
88	Alex Bowman	Hendrick Motorsports	Chevrolet
95	Christopher Bell (R)	Leavine Family Racing	Toyota
96	Daniel Suárez	Gaunt Brothers Racing	Toyota
Official entry list

- Allgaier replaced Jimmie Johnson after Johnson tested positive for COVID-19.

== Qualifying ==
Joey Logano was awarded the pole for the race as determined by a random draw.

=== Starting Lineup ===
Pos	No.	Driver	Team	Manufacturer
1	22	Joey Logano	Team Penske	Ford
2	1	Kurt Busch	Chip Ganassi Racing	Chevrolet
3	88	Alex Bowman	Hendrick Motorsports	Chevrolet
4	48	Justin Allgaier (i)	Hendrick Motorsports	Chevrolet
5	10	Aric Almirola	Stewart-Haas Racing	Ford
6	11	Denny Hamlin	Joe Gibbs Racing	Toyota
7	18	Kyle Busch	Joe Gibbs Racing	Toyota
8	19	Martin Truex Jr.	Joe Gibbs Racing	Toyota
9	2	Brad Keselowski	Team Penske	Ford
10	9	Chase Elliott	Hendrick Motorsports	Chevrolet
11	4	Kevin Harvick	Stewart-Haas Racing	Ford
12	12	Ryan Blaney	Team Penske	Ford
13	8	Tyler Reddick (R)	Richard Childress Racing	Chevrolet
14	6	Ryan Newman	Roush Fenway Racing	Ford
15	21	Matt DiBenedetto	Wood Brothers Racing	Ford
16	3	Austin Dillon	Richard Childress Racing	Chevrolet
17	43	Bubba Wallace	Richard Petty Motorsports	Chevrolet
18	24	William Byron	Hendrick Motorsports	Chevrolet
19	38	John Hunter Nemechek (R)	Front Row Motorsports	Ford
20	17	Chris Buescher	Roush Fenway Racing	Ford
21	42	Matt Kenseth	Chip Ganassi Racing	Chevrolet
22	14	Clint Bowyer	Stewart-Haas Racing	Ford
23	20	Erik Jones	Joe Gibbs Racing	Toyota
24	47	Ricky Stenhouse Jr.	JTG Daugherty Racing	Chevrolet
25	51	Joey Gase (i)	Petty Ware Racing	Ford
26	15	Brennan Poole (R)	Premium Motorsports	Chevrolet
27	34	Michael McDowell	Front Row Motorsports	Ford
28	53	Garrett Smithley (i)	Rick Ware Racing	Chevrolet
29	13	Ty Dillon	Germain Racing	Chevrolet
30	41	Cole Custer (R)	Stewart-Haas Racing	Ford
31	32	Corey LaJoie	Go Fas Racing	Ford
32	77	Ross Chastain (i)	Spire Motorsports	Chevrolet
33	00	Quin Houff (R)	StarCom Racing	Chevrolet
34	27	J. J. Yeley (i)	Rick Ware Racing	Ford
35	95	Christopher Bell (R)	Leavine Family Racing	Toyota
36	37	Ryan Preece	JTG Daugherty Racing	Chevrolet
37	96	Daniel Suárez	Gaunt Brothers Racing	Toyota
38	66	Timmy Hill (i)	MBM Motorsports	Toyota
39	7	Josh Bilicki (i)	Tommy Baldwin Racing	Chevrolet
40	78	B. J. McLeod (i)	B. J. McLeod Motorsports	Chevrolet
Official starting lineup

== Race ==
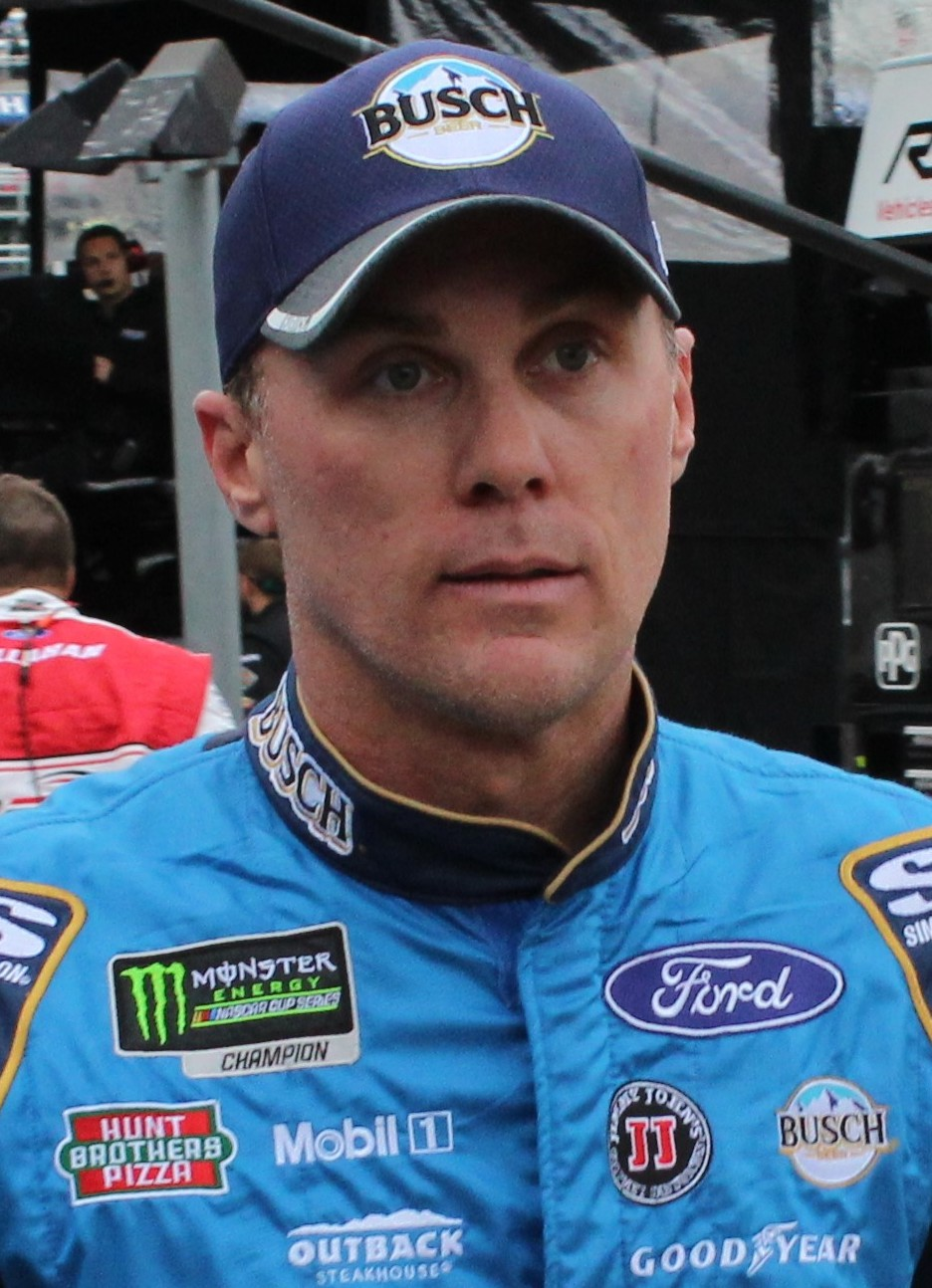
Kevin Harvick won the race.

=== Stage Results ===
Stage One Laps: 50

Pos	No	Driver	Team	Manufacturer	Points
1	24	William Byron	Hendrick Motorsports	Chevrolet	10
2	20	Erik Jones	Joe Gibbs Racing	Toyota	9
3	3	Austin Dillon	Richard Childress Racing	Chevrolet	8
4	9	Chase Elliott	Hendrick Motorsports	Chevrolet	7
5	4	Kevin Harvick	Stewart-Haas Racing	Ford	6
6	11	Denny Hamlin	Joe Gibbs Racing	Toyota	5
7	21	Matt DiBenedetto	Wood Brothers Racing	Ford	4
8	18	Kyle Busch	Joe Gibbs Racing	Toyota	3
9	2	Brad Keselowski	Team Penske	Ford	2
10	14	Clint Bowyer	Stewart-Haas Racing	Ford	1
Official stage one results

Stage Two Laps: 50

Pos	No	Driver	Team	Manufacturer	Points
1	4	Kevin Harvick	Stewart-Haas Racing	Ford	10
2	9	Chase Elliott	Hendrick Motorsports	Chevrolet	9
3	11	Denny Hamlin	Joe Gibbs Racing	Toyota	8
4	21	Matt DiBenedetto	Wood Brothers Racing	Ford	7
5	3	Austin Dillon	Richard Childress Racing	Chevrolet	6
6	42	Matt Kenseth	Chip Ganassi Racing	Chevrolet	5
7	18	Kyle Busch	Joe Gibbs Racing	Toyota	4
8	1	Kurt Busch	Chip Ganassi Racing	Chevrolet	3
9	95	Christopher Bell (R)	Leavine Family Racing	Toyota	2
10	14	Clint Bowyer	Stewart-Haas Racing	Ford	1
Official stage two results

=== Final Stage Results ===
Stage Three Laps: 60

Pos	Grid	No	Driver	Team	Manufacturer	Laps	Points
1	11	4	Kevin Harvick	Stewart-Haas Racing	Ford	161	56
2	21	42	Matt Kenseth	Chip Ganassi Racing	Chevrolet	161	40
3	5	10	Aric Almirola	Stewart-Haas Racing	Ford	161	34
4	9	2	Brad Keselowski	Team Penske	Ford	161	35
5	30	41	Cole Custer (R)	Stewart-Haas Racing	Ford	161	32
6	7	18	Kyle Busch	Joe Gibbs Racing	Toyota	161	38
7	27	34	Michael McDowell	Front Row Motorsports	Ford	161	30
8	13	8	Tyler Reddick (R)	Richard Childress Racing	Chevrolet	161	29
9	17	43	Bubba Wallace	Richard Petty Motorsports	Chevrolet	161	28
10	1	22	Joey Logano	Team Penske	Ford	161	27
11	10	9	Chase Elliott	Hendrick Motorsports	Chevrolet	161	42
12	35	95	Christopher Bell (R)	Leavine Family Racing	Toyota	161	27
13	2	1	Kurt Busch	Chip Ganassi Racing	Chevrolet	161	27
14	29	13	Ty Dillon	Germain Racing	Chevrolet	161	23
15	19	38	John Hunter Nemechek (R)	Front Row Motorsports	Ford	161	22
16	22	14	Clint Bowyer	Stewart-Haas Racing	Ford	161	23
17	32	77	Ross Chastain (i)	Spire Motorsports	Chevrolet	161	0
18	16	3	Austin Dillon	Richard Childress Racing	Chevrolet	161	33
19	15	21	Matt DiBenedetto	Wood Brothers Racing	Ford	161	29
20	37	96	Daniel Suárez	Gaunt Brothers Racing	Toyota	160	17
21	34	27	J. J. Yeley (i)	Rick Ware Racing	Ford	160	0
22	40	78	B. J. McLeod (i)	B. J. McLeod Motorsports	Chevrolet	160	0
23	33	00	Quin Houff (R)	StarCom Racing	Chevrolet	159	14
24	28	53	Garrett Smithley (i)	Rick Ware Racing	Chevrolet	159	0
25	39	7	Josh Bilicki (i)	Tommy Baldwin Racing	Chevrolet	158	0
26	25	51	Joey Gase (i)	Petty Ware Racing	Ford	157	0
27	18	24	William Byron	Hendrick Motorsports	Chevrolet	156	20
28	6	11	Denny Hamlin	Joe Gibbs Racing	Toyota	153	22
29	38	66	Timmy Hill (i)	MBM Motorsports	Toyota	153	0
30	3	88	Alex Bowman	Hendrick Motorsports	Chevrolet	132	7
31	20	17	Chris Buescher	Roush Fenway Racing	Ford	99	6
32	12	12	Ryan Blaney	Team Penske	Ford	96	5
33	23	20	Erik Jones	Joe Gibbs Racing	Toyota	73	13
34	14	6	Ryan Newman	Roush Fenway Racing	Ford	60	3
35	26	15	Brennan Poole (R)	Premium Motorsports	Chevrolet	24	2
36	24	47	Ricky Stenhouse Jr.	JTG Daugherty Racing	Chevrolet	20	1
37	4	48	Justin Allgaier (i)	Hendrick Motorsports	Chevrolet	17	0
38	8	19	Martin Truex Jr.	Joe Gibbs Racing	Toyota	16	1
39	31	32	Corey LaJoie	Go Fas Racing	Ford	15	1
40	36	37	Ryan Preece	JTG Daugherty Racing	Chevrolet	14	1
Official race results

=== Race statistics ===
- Lead changes: 11 among 9 different drivers
- Cautions/Laps: 9 for 43
- Red flags: 1 for 11 minutes and 17 seconds
- Time of race: 3 hours, 16 minutes and 5 seconds
- Average speed: 123.162 miles per hour (198.210 km/h)

== Media ==
=== Television ===
NBC Sports covered the race on the television side. Rick Allen, Jeff Burton, Steve Letarte and Dale Earnhardt Jr. covered the race from the booth at Charlotte Motor Speedway. Marty Snider and Kelli Stavast handled the pit road duties on site. Rutledge Wood handled the features from the track.

NBC
Booth announcers	Pit reporters	Features reporter
Lap-by-lap: Rick Allen; Color-commentator: Jeff Burton; Color-commentator: Steve Letarte; Color-commentator: Dale Earnhardt Jr.	Marty Snider; Kelli Stavast	Rutledge Wood

=== Radio ===
Indianapolis Motor Speedway Radio Network and the Performance Racing Network jointly co-produced the radio broadcast for the race, which was simulcast on Sirius XM NASCAR Radio, and aired on IMS or PRN stations, depending on contractual obligations. The lead announcers and two pit reporters were PRN staff, while the turns announcers and one pit reporter were from IMS.

PRN/IMS Radio
Booth announcers	Turn announcers	Pit reporters
Lead announcer: Doug Rice; Announcer: Pat Patterson; Announcer: Jeff Hammond	Turn 1: Mark Jaynes; Turn 2: Nick Yeoman; Turn 3: Jake Query; Turn 4: Chris Denari	Brad Gillie; Brett McMillan; Michael Young

== Standings after the race ==
Drivers' Championship standings

	Pos	Driver	Points
	1	Kevin Harvick	637
2	2	Chase Elliott	552 (–85)
	3	Brad Keselowski	549 (–88)
2	4	Ryan Blaney	534 (–103)
	5	Denny Hamlin	528 (–109)
	6	Joey Logano	527 (–110)
	7	Martin Truex Jr.	501 (–136)
	8	Alex Bowman	471 (–166)
	9	Aric Almirola	465 (–172)
1	10	Kyle Busch	461 (–176)
1	11	Kurt Busch	457 (–180)
2	12	Matt DiBenedetto	413 (–224)
	13	Clint Bowyer	410 (–227)
1	14	William Byron	392 (–245)
3	15	Jimmie Johnson	390 (–247)
1	16	Austin Dillon	360 (–277)
Official driver's standings

Manufacturers' Championship standings

Pos	Manufacturer	Points
1	Ford	599
2	Toyota	558 (–41)
3	Chevrolet	537 (–62)

- Note: Only the first 16 positions are included for the driver standings.
- . – Driver has clinched a position in the NASCAR Cup Series playoffs.

Previous race: 2020 Pocono 350	NASCAR Cup Series; 2020 season	Next race: 2020 Quaker State 400
