= Hyak Motorsports =

Auto racing team

- Owners: Gordon Smith; Brad Daugherty; Mark Hughes; Ernie Cope
- Base: Harrisburg, North Carolina
- Series: NASCAR Cup Series
- Race drivers: 47. Ricky Stenhouse Jr.
- Manufacturer: Chevrolet
- Opened: 1995
- Website: hyakmotorsports.com

Career
- Debut: Cup Series: 2008 Brickyard 400 (Indianapolis); Nationwide Series: 1995 Goody's 300 (Daytona); Craftsman Truck Series: 2006 Kroger 250 (Martinsville)
- Latest race: Cup Series: 2026 Season Finale 400 (Homestead); Nationwide Series; 2010 NAPA Auto Parts 200 (Montreal); Craftsman Truck Series: 2008 AAA Insurance 200 (Dover)
- Drivers' Championships: Total: 0; Cup Series: 0; Nationwide Series: 0; Craftsman Truck Series: 0
- Race victories: Total: 7; Cup Series: 3; Nationwide Series: 4; Craftsman Truck Series: 0
- Pole positions: Total: 12; Cup Series: 3; Nationwide Series: 8; Craftsman Truck Series: 1

Hyak Motorsports is an American stock car racing team that competes in the NASCAR Cup Series. The team fields the No. 47 Chevrolet Camaro ZL1 full-time for Ricky Stenhouse Jr. and has a technical alliance with Hendrick Motorsports. The team was founded in 1995 as ST Racing. It scored its first Cup Series win in 2014 with driver A. J. Allmendinger and won the 2023 Daytona 500 with Stenhouse.

== History ==
Logo as JTG Daugherty Racing

The team was founded in 1995 as ST Racing by advertising executive Tad Geschickter and crew chief Steve Plattenberger, competing in the Busch Grand National Series (now the NASCAR O'Reilly Auto Parts Series). In 2006, the team rebranded to JTG Racing under the ownership of Geschickter and his wife Jodi, and began competing in the Cup Series, initially as a co-entry with Wood Brothers Racing. Former NBA All-Star center Brad Daugherty joined the ownership group in 2008 to form JTG Daugherty Racing. Under this name, the team would begin competing independently from the Wood Brothers in 2009, score their first Cup Series win in 2014 with driver A. J. Allmendinger, and win the 2023 Daytona 500 with Stenhouse. Other notable drivers to compete for the team during this period include Marcos Ambrose, Bobby Labonte, and Chris Buescher.

Before the 2024 season, the Geschickters quietly left the team, moving into a role at Joe Gibbs Racing. Entrepreneur Gordon Smith would become principal owner thereafter and rebranded the team to Hyak Motorsports for the 2025 season; Daugherty, Mark Hughes and Ernie Cope completed the ownership group at that time. The name "Hyak" means "fast" in Chinook Jargon, and is also in reference to Smith's marine transportation company Hyak Maritime.

== Cup Series ==
=== Car No. 37 history ===
==== Chris Buescher (2017–2019) ====
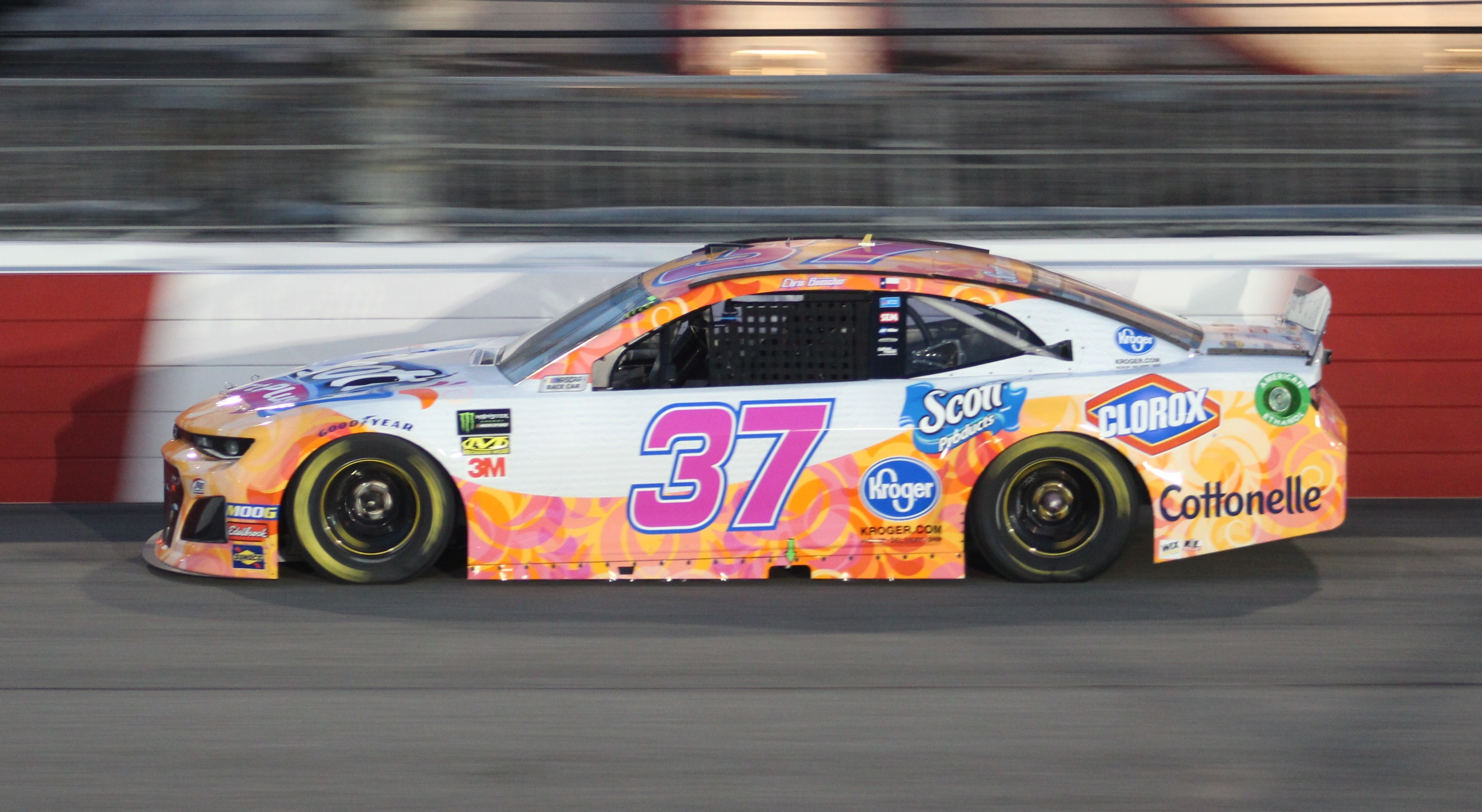
Chris Buescher in the No. 37 at Richmond Raceway in 2019

In November 2016, the team announced plans to expand to two cars for the 2017 season. On November 29, Roush Fenway Racing leased their No. 16 charter to JTG, while also loaning driver Chris Buescher to the team. The new car was revealed to be the No. 37 on December 12. During the 2016-17 offseason, it was revealed that the sponsors of the 37 car would be products sold at Kroger stores like Cottonelle, Cheerios, Bush's Baked Beans, Kingsford, and Scott Products. Liberty Tax Service was added as a sponsor on June 2, 2017. In 2018, JTGDR purchased Furniture Row Racing's No. 77 charter for the No. 37; the charter leased from Roush Fenway Racing was subsequently sold to Team Penske for the No. 12.

Throughout his three-year tenure in the No. 37, Buescher's best finish was fifth at both Daytona races in 2018, and his best points finish was twentieth in 2019. On September 25, 2019, it was announced that Buescher will return to Roush Fenway Racing to replace Ricky Stenhouse Jr. in the No. 17 Ford in 2020.

==== Ryan Preece (2020–2021) ====
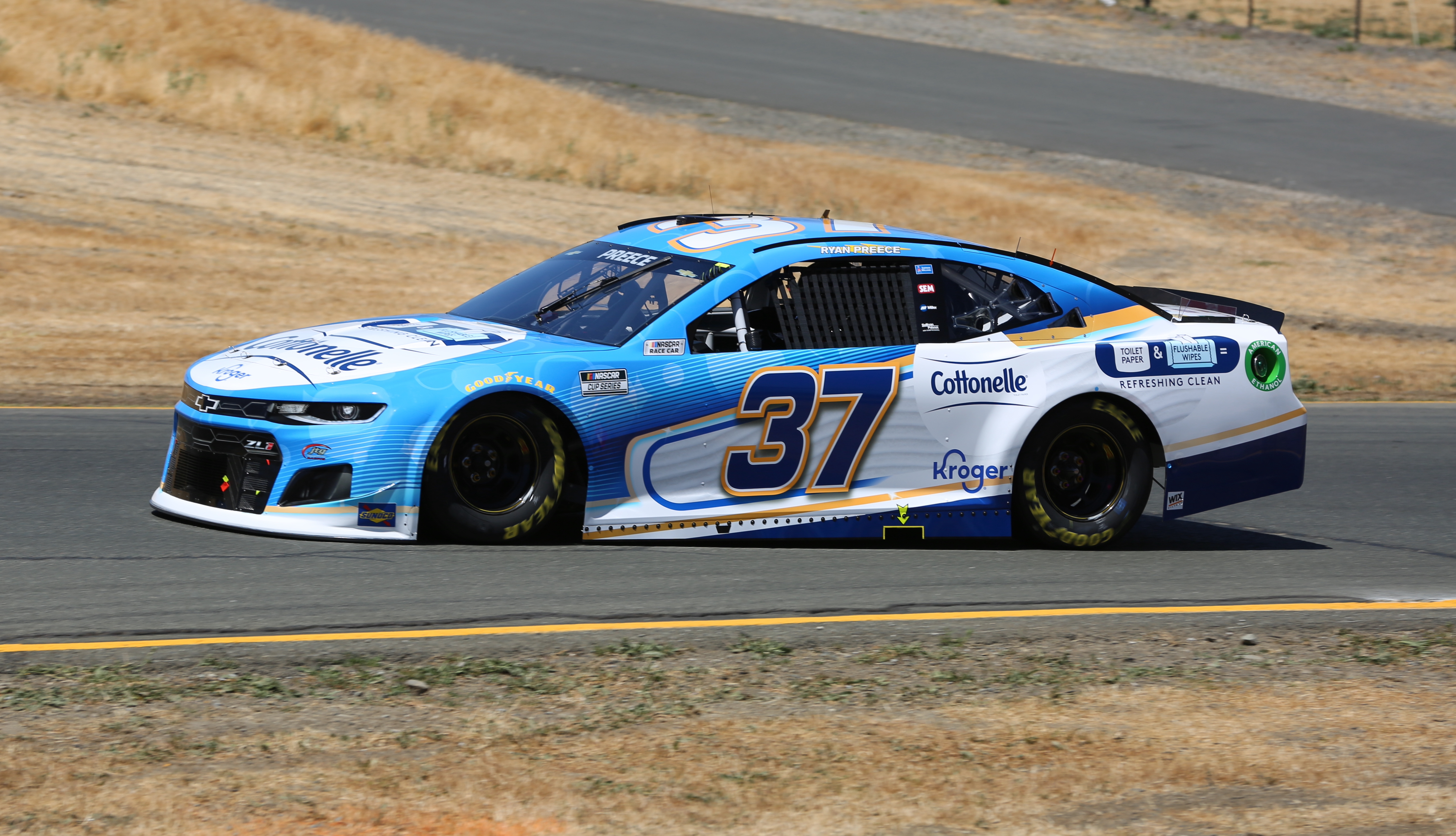
Ryan Preece in the No. 37 at Sonoma Raceway in 2021

On August 16, 2019, Ryan Preece confirmed he would return to JTG Daugherty Racing for the 2020 season, this time, in the No. 37, with his new teammate Stenhouse (who replaced Buescher) in the No. 47 which Preece drove in 2019. Prior to the 2020 Auto Club 400 at Fontana, the No. 37 team was docked 10 owner and driver points and crew chief Trent Owens was suspended for the race after the car was discovered to have an illegal modification during pre-race inspection. Preece struggled mightily throughout the 2020 season, finishing last a total of four times, three of them consecutively. After a violent wreck at Kansas where he walked away unharmed, Preece managed to score two top-10 finishes but ended the season 29th in the standings. For the 2021 season, the No. 37 would be the only full-time non-chartered team after Spire Motorsports purchased the team's charter. Following the 2021 season, the No. 37 team was shut down.

==== Car No. 37 results ====
Year	Driver	No.	Make	1	2	3	4	5	6	7	8	9	10	11	12	13	14	15	16	17	18	19	20	21	22	23	24	25	26	27	28	29	30	31	32	33	34	35	36	Owners	Pts
2017	Chris Buescher	37	Chevy	DAY; 35	ATL; 24	LVS; 23	PHO; 27	CAL; 25	MAR; 11	TEX; 21	BRI; 39	RCH; 17	TAL; 15	KAN; 18	CLT; 20	DOV; 23	POC; 19	MCH; 36	SON; 19	DAY; 10	KEN; 16	NHA; 25	IND; 9	POC; 28	GLN; 11	MCH; 6	BRI; 27	DAR; 17	RCH; 32	CHI; 27	NHA; 21	DOV; 30	CLT; 18	TAL; 17	KAN; 6	MAR; 21	TEX; 22	PHO; 37	HOM; 20	26th	564
2018	Chris Buescher	37	Chevy	DAY; 5	ATL; 25	LVS; 15	PHO; 29	CAL; 30	MAR; 23	TEX; 15	BRI; 36	RCH; 26	TAL; 11	DOV; 20	KAN; 34	CLT; 29	POC; 17	MCH; 24	SON; 12	CHI; 22	DAY; 5	KEN; 23	NHA; 20	POC; 37	GLN; 20	MCH; 20	BRI; 19	DAR; 13	IND; 25	LVS; 15	RCH; 30	CLT; 17	DOV; 25	TAL; 21	KAN; 16	MAR; 13	TEX; 23	PHO; 18	HOM; 23	24th	585
2019	Chris Buescher	37	Chevy	DAY; 37	ATL; 9	LVS; 18	PHO; 16	CAL; 16	MAR; 21	TEX; 20	BRI; 22	RCH; 22	TAL; 30	DOV; 23	KAN; 10	CLT; 6	POC; 14	MCH; 16	SON; 16	CHI; 18	DAY; 17	KEN; 10	NHA; 15	POC; 16	GLN; 13	MCH; 14	BRI; 17	DAR; 12	IND; 15	LVS; 18	RCH; 31	CLT; 18	DOV; 36	TAL; 20	KAN; 13	MAR; 12	TEX; 19	PHO; 16	HOM; 16	20th	729
2020	Ryan Preece	37	Chevy	DAY; 29	LVS; 37	CAL; 30	PHO; 18	DAR; 20	DAR; 39	CLT; 22	CLT; 24	BRI; 12	ATL; 26	MAR; 26	HOM; 24	TAL; 15	POC; 20	POC; 25	IND; 40	KEN; 38	TEX; 40	KAN; 34	NHA; 16	MCH; 25	MCH; 16	DRC; 23	DOV; 25	DOV; 26	DAY; 37	DAR; 17	RCH; 20	BRI; 9	LVS; 19	TAL; 10	CLT; 14	KAN; 29	TEX; 18	MAR; 19	PHO; 34	29th	477
2021	Ryan Preece	37	Chevy	DAY; 6	DRC; 9	HOM; 21	LVS; 15	PHO; 26	ATL; 25	BRI; 18	MAR; 36	RCH; 29	TAL; 14	KAN; 32	DAR; 25	DOV; 18	COA; 15	CLT; 26	SON; 21	NSS; 32	POC; 23	POC; 8	ROA; 40	ATL; 25	NHA; 22	GLN; 28	IND; 35	MCH; 21	DAY; 4	DAR; 12	RCH; 25	BRI; 17	LVS; 28	TAL; 32	CLT; 19	TEX; 36	KAN; 21	MAR; 36	PHO; 20	27th	557

=== Car No. 47 history ===
In 2006, JTG Racing started a partnership with Wood Brothers Racing to field the No. 21 car under the banner of Wood Brothers/JTG Racing. JTG Daugherty attempted to make their Cup Series debut at Las Vegas with Ken Schrader behind the wheel of the No. 47 Ford Fusion, a second car to the Wood Brothers' No. 21, but the team failed to qualify for the race. Jon Wood attempted to qualify the No. 47 at Kansas, but also failed to make the field.

==== Marcos Ambrose (2008–2010) ====
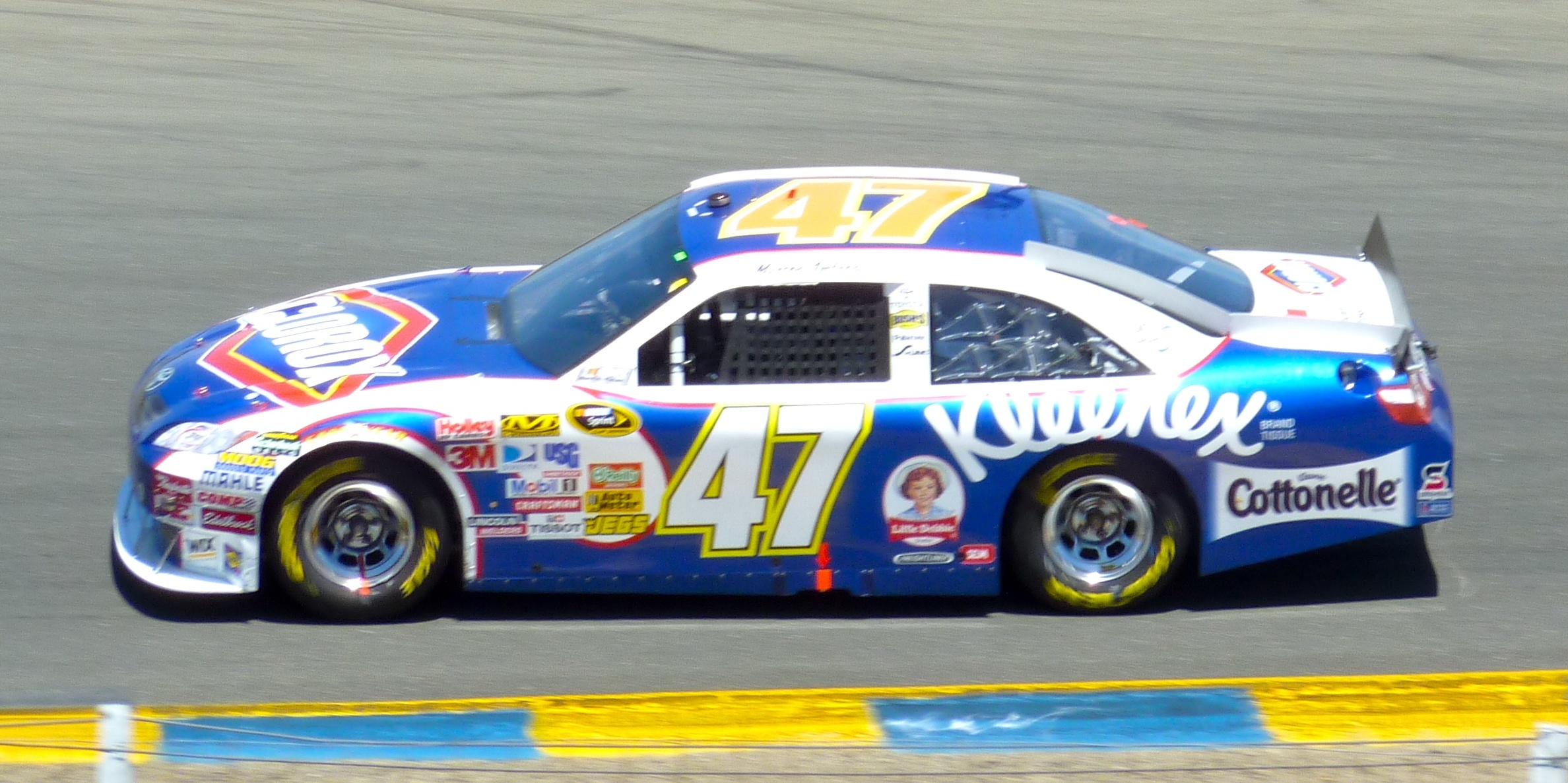
Marcos Ambrose in the No. 47 during the 2010 Toyota/Save Mart 350

With the new ownership at JTG Daugherty Racing in 2008, they fielded the No. 47 car with Marcos Ambrose behind the wheel. Ambrose finished 22nd at Indianapolis and 36th at Kansas. On October 1, JTGDR signed a deal to enter into a technical alliance with Michael Waltrip Racing for the 2009 season, effectively switching from the Ford Fusion to the Toyota Camry.

During the team's first full-time run in 2009, Ambrose finished an impressive fourth at Talladega, third at Sonoma, second at Watkins Glen, and third at Bristol. With a total of seven top-ten finishes, he ended the season eighteenth in the points standings.

The No. 47 car with Ambrose saw a decline in performance in 2010, with the highlight being a duel with race winner Juan Pablo Montoya at Watkins Glen to finish third. With a total of five top-ten finishes, Ambrose ended the season 27th in the points standings. After the season, Ambrose left the team to drive for Richard Petty Motorsports in 2011.

==== Bobby Labonte (2011–2013) ====
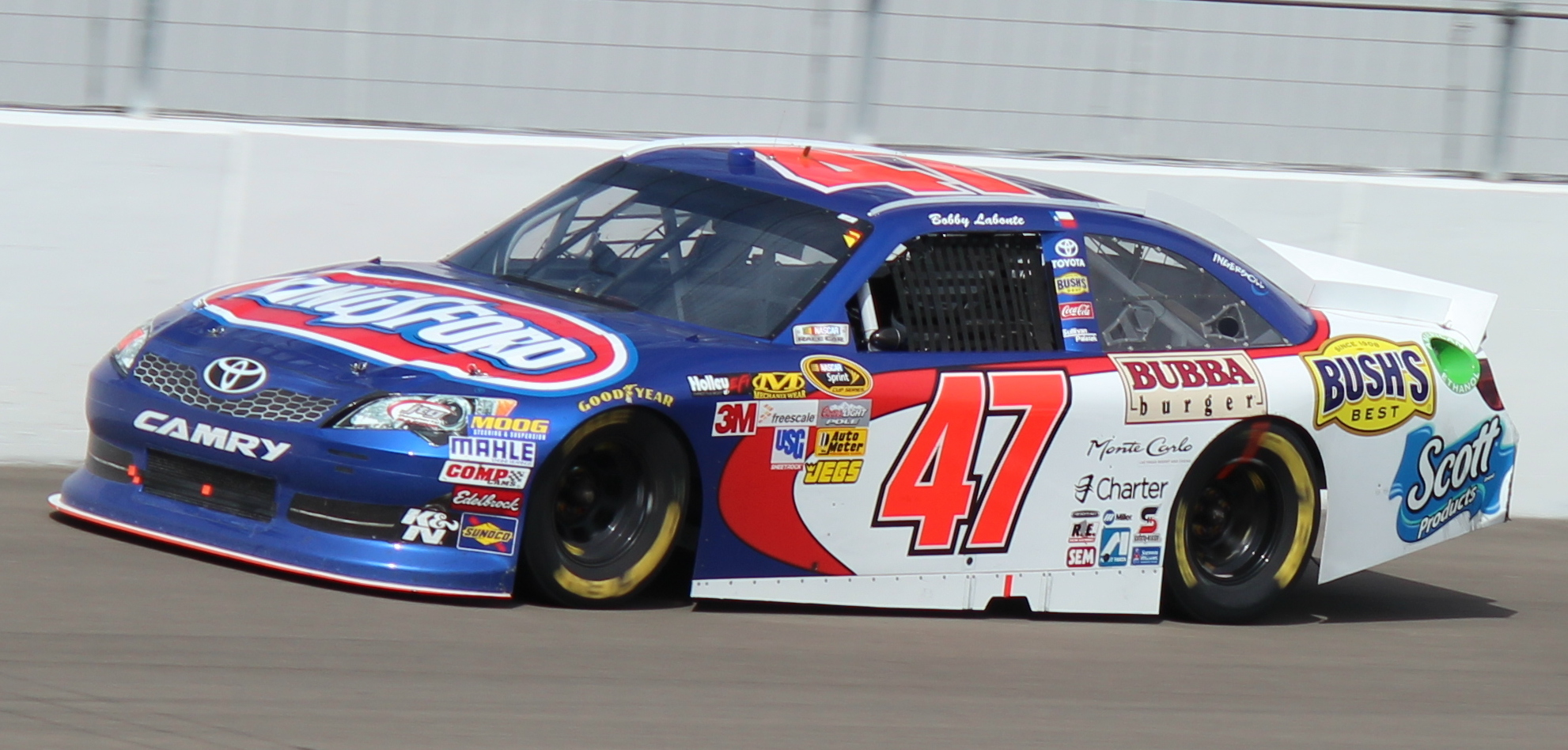
Bobby Labonte in the No. 47 at Las Vegas Motor Speedway in 2012

For the 2011 season JTGDR signed 2000 Cup Series champion Bobby Labonte to drive the No. 47 car. Labonte started the season with a fourth place finish at the 2011 Daytona 500. Alongside a seventh place finish at New Hampshire, he finished the season 29th in the points standings.

The 2012 season saw a slight improvement in finishes, with top-ten finishes at the Daytona night race and the Martinsville fall race, ending the season 26th in the points standings.

After a 15th place finish at the 2013 Daytona 500, Labonte struggled through the first fourteen races of the 2013 season before splitting the rest of the season with A. J. Allmendinger, who scored the team's sole top-ten finish at Watkins Glen during the season. The No. 47 car finished 31st in the points standings.

==== A. J. Allmendinger (2013–2018) ====
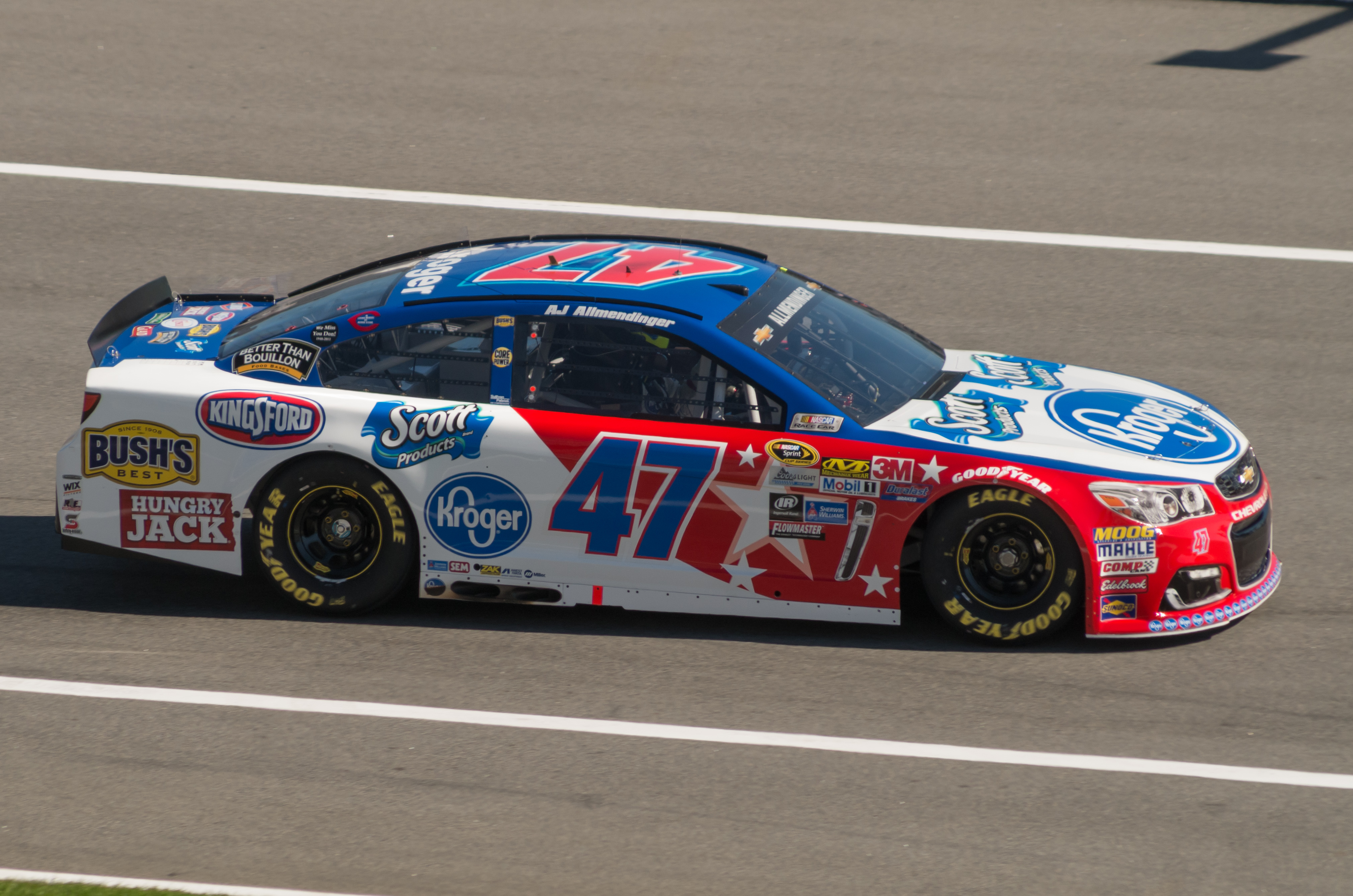
A. J. Allmendinger in the No. 47 at Daytona International Speedway in 2016

On August 29, 2013, Sporting News reported that Allmendinger would be the full-time driver for JTGDR in 2014. The team also switched to Chevrolet and formed a technical alliance with Richard Childress Racing.

During the 2014 season, Allmendinger scored top-ten finishes at Fontana, Richmond, and Talladega. He also made the field at the Sprint All-Star Race after finishing second to Clint Bowyer on the Sprint Showdown. At Watkins Glen, Allmendinger led 29 laps to give JTGDR its first win and a spot in the Chase for the Sprint Cup. After scoring a top-ten finish at Martinsville, he ended the season 13th in the points standings - the highest finish in the team's history.

The 2015 season saw a decline in performance, as Allmendinger scored only three top-ten finishes and ended the season 22nd in the points standings. Allmendinger and Kroger inked a multi-year contract extension following the season.

For 2016, Allmendinger scored top-five finishes at Martinsville and Watkins Glen, totaling to nine top-ten finishes and ending the season twentieth in the points standings.

Allmendinger started the 2017 season with a third place finish at the 2017 Daytona 500. With a total of five top-ten finishes, he ended the season 28th in the points standings.

Allmendinger began the 2018 season with a tenth place finish at the 2018 Daytona 500. He later followed it up with a third place finish at the Daytona summer race. With a total of five top-ten finishes, Allmendinger ended the season 22nd in the points standings.

==== Ryan Preece (2019) ====
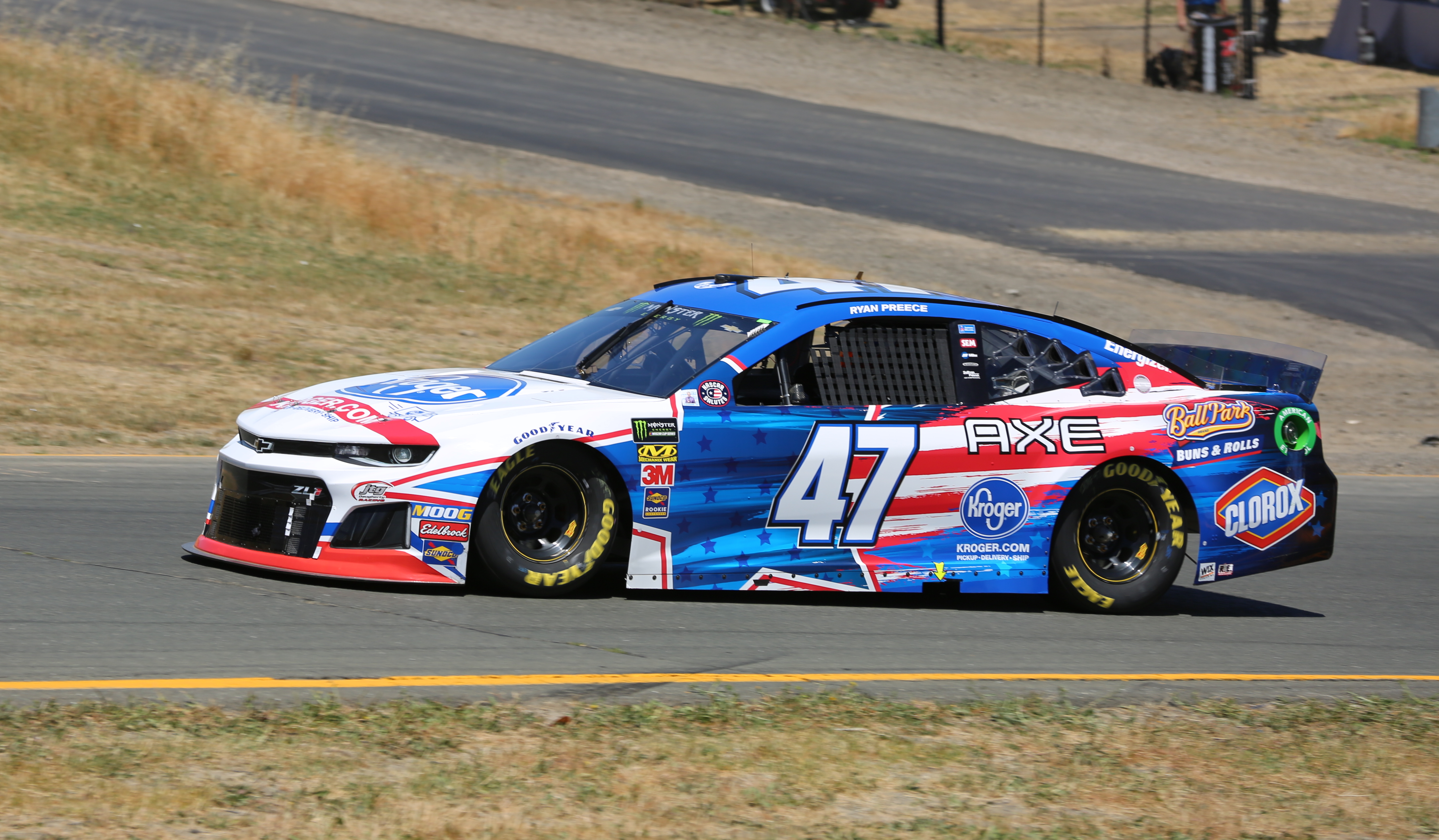
Preece's No. 47 during the 2019 Toyota/Save Mart 350

On September 25, 2018, it was announced that Allmendinger would part ways with JTG Daugherty at the end of the 2018 season. Three days later, it was announced that Ryan Preece would replace him as the driver of the No. 47 in 2019. In addition, Preece would compete for 2019 Rookie of the Year honors. Furthermore, JTGDR switched their technical alliance from RCR to Hendrick Motorsports.

Preece started the 2019 season with an eighth-place finish at the 2019 Daytona 500. Throughout the season, he scored one top-five and three top-ten finishes, and ended the season 26th in the points standings.

==== Ricky Stenhouse Jr. (2020–present) ====
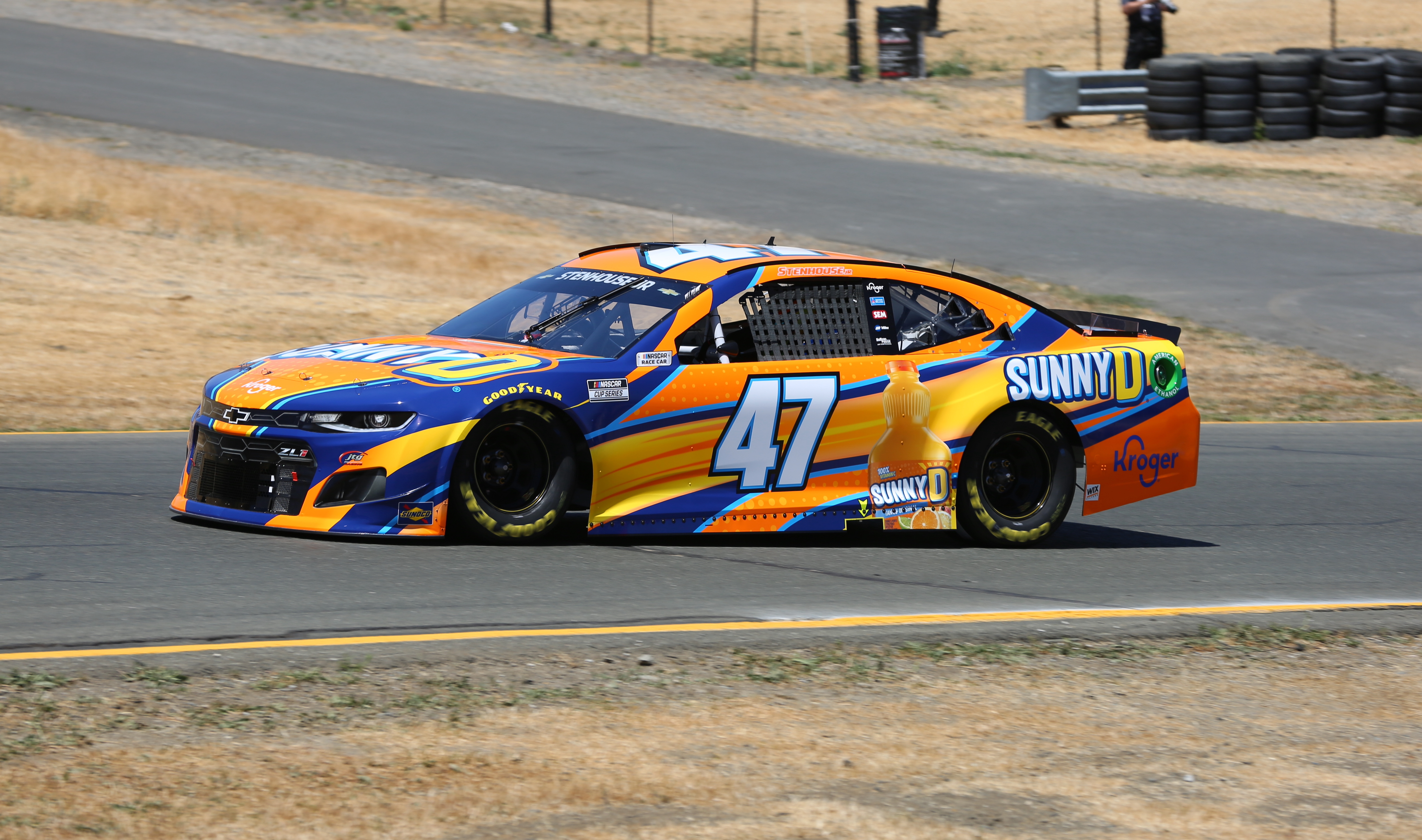
Ricky Stenhouse Jr. in the No. 47 at Sonoma Raceway in 2021

On October 16, 2019, JTGDR announced Ricky Stenhouse Jr. would drive the No. 47 in 2020. The team later announced that Stenhouse would drive the car with Brian Pattie as the crew chief and moved Preece to the No. 37 car.

Stenhouse got off to a quick start for the team, winning the pole for the 2020 Daytona 500, the first pole for JTGDR on an oval. He followed up a twentieth place finish at Daytona with a strong showing at Las Vegas, leading thirty laps and finishing third. Prior to the 2020 Auto Club 400 at Fontana, the No. 47 team was docked ten owner and driver points and crew chief Brian Pattie was suspended for the race after the car was discovered to have an illegal modification during pre-race inspection. Stenhouse later finished fourth in the 2020 Alsco Uniforms 500 and followed it up by finishing second at Talladega in a close race. He ended his first season with the team 24th in the standings.

Stenhouse began the 2021 season with an 18th place finish at the 2021 Daytona 500. He earned his best finish of the season of 2nd place at the inaugural Bristol Dirt Race. He ended the season 22nd in the standings.

Stenhouse began the 2022 season with a 28th place DNF at the 2022 Daytona 500. He earned his best finish of the season of 2nd place at Dover. He ended the season one top-five and five top-ten finishes.

Stenhouse started the 2023 season by winning the 2023 Daytona 500, scoring his third career victory, and second for JTGDR. He was eliminated at the conclusion of the Round of 16.

Stenhouse began the 2024 season with a 31st place DNF at the 2024 Daytona 500. At the 2024 NASCAR All-Star Race, he was sent to the outside wall by Kyle Busch on lap two. After the race, Stenhouse attacked Busch in the garage area, triggering a brawl between the drivers and their pit crew. NASCAR later fined Stenhouse US$75,000 for the incident; in addition, his father, Ricky Stenhouse Sr., was suspended indefinitely while team mechanic Clint Myrick was suspended for eight races and tuner Keith Matthews was suspended for four races for their involvement in the fight. Stenhouse Sr.'s suspension was lifted on September 24. Despite mediocre finishes that left him out of playoff contention, Stenhouse won at Talladega after beating Brad Keselowski by .006 seconds.

Stenhouse began the 2025 season with an 18th-place finish at the 2025 Daytona 500. Despite a promising start to the season in which he scored ten top-20 finishes in the first 15 races and climbed as high as 13th in the points standings, he ultimately struggled during the latter half of the regular season, missing the playoffs and ending the season 30th in the final standings with only three top-ten finishes.

Stenhouse began the 2026 season with an 2nd-place finish at the 2026 Daytona 500. He signed a contract extension with the team on May 11.

==== Car No. 47 results ====
Year	Driver	No.	Make	1	2	3	4	5	6	7	8	9	10	11	12	13	14	15	16	17	18	19	20	21	22	23	24	25	26	27	28	29	30	31	32	33	34	35	36	Owners	Pts
2007	Ken Schrader	47	Ford	DAY	CAL	LVS; DNQ	ATL	BRI	MAR	TEX	PHO	TAL	RCH	DAR	CLT	DOV	POC	MCH	SON	NHA	DAY	CHI	IND	POC	GLN	MCH	BRI	CAL	RCH	NHA	DOV									63rd	26
2007	Jon Wood	47	Ford																													KAN; DNQ	TAL	CLT	MAR	ATL	TEX	PHO	HOM	63rd	26
2008	Marcos Ambrose	47	Ford	DAY	CAL	LVS	ATL	BRI	MAR	TEX	PHO	TAL	RCH	DAR	CLT	DOV	POC	MCH	SON	NHA	DAY	CHI	IND; 22	POC	GLN	MCH	BRI	CAL	RCH	NHA	DOV	KAN; 36	TAL	CLT	MAR	ATL	TEX	PHO	HOM	52nd	152
2009	Marcos Ambrose	47	Toyota	DAY; 17	CAL; 22	LVS; 20	ATL; 38	BRI; 10	MAR; 14	TEX; 41	PHO; 14	TAL; 4	RCH; 11	DAR; 33	CLT; 26	DOV; 20	POC; 6	MCH; 31	SON; 3	NHA; 23	DAY; 6	CHI; 11	IND; 22	POC; 34	GLN; 2	MCH; 35	BRI; 3	ATL; 23	RCH; 22	NHA; 20	DOV; 14	KAN; 14	CAL; 23	CLT; 22	MAR; 27	TAL; 34	TEX; 15	PHO; 11	HOM; 35	18th	3830
2010	Marcos Ambrose	47	Toyota	DAY; 41	CAL; 35	LVS; 14	ATL; 11	BRI; 33	MAR; 11	PHO; 11	TEX; 17	TAL; 37	RCH; 9	DAR; 25	DOV; 36	CLT; 36	POC; 30	MCH; 15	SON; 6	NHA; 13	DAY; 32	CHI; 28	IND; 21	POC; 39	GLN; 3	MCH; 15	BRI; 20	ATL; 10	RCH; 5	NHA; 30	DOV; 20	KAN; 34	CAL; 33	CLT; 16	MAR; 34	TAL; 34	TEX; 12	PHO; 22	HOM; 26	27th	3422
2011	Bobby Labonte	47	Toyota	DAY; 4	PHO; 21	LVS; 24	BRI; 13	CAL; 38	MAR; 27	TEX; 25	TAL; 24	RCH; 24	DAR; 18	DOV; 18	CLT; 24	KAN; 28	POC; 28	MCH; 22	SON; 38	DAY; 31	KEN; 26	NHA; 7	IND; 17	POC; 25	GLN; 19	MCH; 16	BRI; 34	ATL; 38	RCH; 20	CHI; 37	NHA; 19	DOV; 26	KAN; 30	CLT; 29	TAL; 35	MAR; 32	TEX; 28	PHO; 21	HOM; 27	29th	670
2012	Bobby Labonte	47	Toyota	DAY; 14	PHO; 16	LVS; 26	BRI; 28	CAL; 28	MAR; 17	TEX; 27	KAN; 35	RCH; 17	TAL; 21	DAR; 29	CLT; 28	DOV; 20	POC; 22	MCH; 16	SON; 24	KEN; 27	DAY; 10	NHA; 23	IND; 26	POC; 27	GLN; 19	MCH; 25	BRI; 14	ATL; 19	RCH; 25	CHI; 26	NHA; 20	DOV; 14	TAL; 18	CLT; 32	KAN; 33	MAR; 9	TEX; 33	PHO; 15	HOM; 25	26th	772
2013	Bobby Labonte	47	Toyota	DAY; 15	PHO; 24	LVS; 30	BRI; 41	CAL; 28	MAR; 21	TEX; 42	KAN; 24	RCH; 19	TAL; 20	DAR; 26	CLT; 24	DOV; 21	POC; 27		SON; 43		DAY; 23	NHA; 27	IND; 36	POC; 19		MCH; 35	BRI; 38				NHA; 40			CLT; 28	TAL; 34	MAR; 32	TEX; 40	PHO; 22		31st	624
2013	A. J. Allmendinger	47	Toyota															MCH; 19		KEN; 22					GLN; 10			ATL; 14	RCH; 15	CHI; 21		DOV; 26	KAN; 20						HOM; 36	31st	624
2014	A. J. Allmendinger	47	Chevy	DAY; 26	PHO; 26	LVS; 18	BRI; 25	CAL; 8	MAR; 11	TEX; 23	DAR; 15	RCH; 6	TAL; 5	KAN; 30	CLT; 23	DOV; 21	POC; 21	MCH; 22	SON; 37*	KEN; 22	DAY; 43	NHA; 18	IND; 18	POC; 34	GLN; 1*	MCH; 13	BRI; 14	ATL; 40	RCH; 23	CHI; 22	NHA; 13	DOV; 23	KAN; 11	CLT; 12	TAL; 23	MAR; 9	TEX; 14	PHO; 16	HOM; 40	13th	2260
2015	A. J. Allmendinger	47	Chevy	DAY; 20	ATL; 7	LVS; 6	PHO; 17	CAL; 34	MAR; 43	TEX; 21	BRI; 34	RCH; 13	TAL; 17	KAN; 14	CLT; 29	DOV; 24	POC; 38	MCH; 23	SON; 37	DAY; 21	KEN; 26	NHA; 13	IND; 23	POC; 7	GLN; 24	MCH; 28	BRI; 27	DAR; 23	RCH; 24	CHI; 36	NHA; 23	DOV; 29	CLT; 16	KAN; 27	TAL; 36	MAR; 11	TEX; 17	PHO; 24	HOM; 20	22nd	758
2016	A. J. Allmendinger	47	Chevy	DAY; 21	ATL; 27	LVS; 14	PHO; 17	CAL; 8	MAR; 2	TEX; 22	BRI; 19	RCH; 25	TAL; 14	KAN; 8	DOV; 23	CLT; 16	POC; 16	MCH; 38	SON; 14	DAY; 13	KEN; 36	NHA; 21	IND; 38	POC; 14	GLN; 4	BRI; 9	MCH; 15	DAR; 23	RCH; 20	CHI; 17	NHA; 21	DOV; 19	CLT; 37	KAN; 8	TAL; 10	MAR; 10	TEX; 17	PHO; 17	HOM; 8	20th	830
2017	A. J. Allmendinger	47	Chevy	DAY; 3	ATL; 26	LVS; 24	PHO; 26	CAL; 17	MAR; 6	TEX; 20	BRI; 30	RCH; 37	TAL; 31	KAN; 30	CLT; 18	DOV; 18	POC; 22	MCH; 18	SON; 35	DAY; 8	KEN; 20	NHA; 21	IND; 10	POC; 23	GLN; 9	MCH; 20	BRI; 22	DAR; 34	RCH; 26	CHI; 26	NHA; 17	DOV; 28	CLT; 20	TAL; 22	KAN; 32	MAR; 40	TEX; 16	PHO; 23	HOM; 14	28th	531
2018	A. J. Allmendinger	47	Chevy	DAY; 10	ATL; 29	LVS; 30	PHO; 21	CAL; 22	MAR; 8	TEX; 24	BRI; 17	RCH; 27	TAL; 34	DOV; 21	KAN; 16	CLT; 23	POC; 22	MCH; 17	SON; 38	CHI; 24	DAY; 3	KEN; 30	NHA; 36	POC; 14	GLN; 15	MCH; 22	BRI; 39	DAR; 22	IND; 37	LVS; 14	RCH; 29	CLT; 7	DOV; 22	TAL; 6	KAN; 21	MAR; 14	TEX; 20	PHO; 12	HOM; 19	22nd	603
2019	Ryan Preece	47	Chevy	DAY; 8	ATL; 35	LVS; 25	PHO; 34	CAL; 23	MAR; 16	TEX; 22	BRI; 25	RCH; 20	TAL; 3	DOV; 28	KAN; 25	CLT; 31	POC; 23	MCH; 25	SON; 29	CHI; 28	DAY; 32	KEN; 21	NHA; 21	POC; 37	GLN; 36	MCH; 7	BRI; 18	DAR; 22	IND; 16	LVS; 27	RCH; 32	CLT; 21	DOV; 19	TAL; 18	KAN; 12	MAR; 19	TEX; 23	PHO; 26	HOM; 25	26th	507
2020	Ricky Stenhouse Jr.	47	Chevy	DAY; 20	LVS; 3	CAL; 20	PHO; 22	DAR; 40	DAR; 25	CLT; 24	CLT; 4	BRI; 34	ATL; 13	MAR; 21	HOM; 20	TAL; 2	POC; 17	POC; 15	IND; 36	KEN; 29	TEX; 38	KAN; 40	NHA; 14	MCH; 32	MCH; 19	DAY; 16	DOV; 10	DOV; 37	DAY; 32	DAR; 19	RCH; 18	BRI; 40	LVS; 23	TAL; 38	CLT; 17	KAN; 16	TEX; 12	MAR; 20	PHO; 27	26th	584
2021	Ricky Stenhouse Jr.	47	Chevy	DAY; 18	DAY; 18	HOM; 13	LVS; 11	PHO; 12	ATL; 12	BRI; 2	MAR; 15	RCH; 17	TAL; 33	KAN; 34	DAR; 20	DOV; 20	COA; 22	CLT; 12	SON; 37	NSS; 6	POC; 15	POC; 38	ROA; 12	ATL; 37	NHA; 15	GLN; 19	IND; 11	MCH; 12	DAY; 22	DAR; 17	RCH; 23	BRI; 20	LVS; 17	TAL; 16	CLT; 21	TEX; 34	KAN; 24	MAR; 19	PHO; 36	22nd	666
2022	Ricky Stenhouse Jr.	47	Chevy	DAY; 28	CAL; 10	LVS; 21	PHO; 28	ATL; 31	COA; 37	RCH; 28	MAR; 27	BRI; 29	TAL; 30	DOV; 2	DAR; 8	KAN; 8	CLT; 7	GTW; 32	SON; 25	NSS; 16	ROA; 19	ATL; 31	NHA; 22	POC; 18	IND; 13	MCH; 33	RCH; 22	GLN; 15	DAY; 22	DAR; 35	KAN; 30	BRI; 33	TEX; 27	TAL; 22	ROV; 19	LVS; 23	HOM; 15	MAR; 22	PHO; 32	28th	580
2023	Ricky Stenhouse Jr.	47	Chevy	DAY; 1	CAL; 12	LVS; 24	PHO; 19	ATL; 17	COA; 7	RCH; 35	BRD; 4	MAR; 8	TAL; 15	DOV; 15	KAN; 12	DAR; 13	CLT; 7	GTW; 32	SON; 12	NSS; 22	CSC; 34	ATL; 10	NHA; 18	POC; 7	RCH; 17	MCH; 21	IRC; 25	GLN; 13	DAY; 34	DAR; 16	KAN; 23	BRI; 10	TEX; 9	TAL; 22	ROV; 34	LVS; 24	HOM; 27	MAR; 19	PHO; 23	16th	2168
2024	Ricky Stenhouse Jr.	47	Chevy	DAY; 31	ATL; 6	LVS; 17	PHO; 21	BRI; 33	COA; 28	RCH; 33	MAR; 29	TEX; 23	TAL; 4	DOV; 35	KAN; 16	DAR; 23	CLT; 31	GTW; 20	SON; 24	IOW; 5	NHA; 7	NSS; 30	CSC; 6	POC; 33	IND; 11	RCH; 36	MCH; 13	DAY; 33	DAR; 22	ATL; 14	GLN; 37	BRI; 27	KAN; 28	TAL; 1	ROV; 16	LVS; 27	HOM; 21	MAR; 20	PHO; 33	25th	590
2025	Ricky Stenhouse Jr.	47	Chevy	DAY; 18	ATL; 5	COA; 18	PHO; 21	LVS; 18	HOM; 24	MAR; 20	DAR; 25	BRI; 22	TAL; 12	TEX; 6	KAN; 19	CLT; 11	NSS; 39	MCH; 20	MXC; 27	POC; 30	ATL; 6	CSC; 31	SON; 33	DOV; 23	IND; 35	IOW; 33	GLN; 23	RCH; 23	DAY; 35	DAR; 30	GTW; 20	BRI; 22	NHA; 25	KAN; 35	ROV; 19	LVS; 14	TAL; 38	MAR; 27	PHO; 17	30th	562
2026	Ricky Stenhouse Jr.	47	Chevy	DAY; 2	ATL; 36	COA; 28	PHO; 22	LVS; 29	DAR; 29	MAR; 30	BRI; 17	KAN; 21	TAL; 6	TEX; 19	GLN; 31	CLT; 12	NSS; 4	MCH; 29	POC; 15	COR; 33	SON; 21	CHI; 26	ATL; 23	NWS; 34	IND; 20	IOW; 18	RCH; 31	NHA; 28	DAY; 5	DAR; 35	GTW; 26	BRI; 30	KAN; 32	LVS; 32	CLT; 23	PHO; 30	TAL; 3	MAR; 30	HOM; 32	28th	527

== Nationwide Series ==
=== Car No. 22 history ===
==== Adam Petty (1998) ====
In 1998, ST fielded the No. 22 Spree Chevy in three races with Adam Petty as the driver. His best finish was 27th (twice).

==== Car No. 22 results ====
Year	Team	No.	Make	1	2	3	4	5	6	7	8	9	10	11	12	13	14	15	16	17	18	19	20	21	22	23	24	25	26	27	28	29	30	31	Owners	Pts
1998	Adam Petty	22	Chevy	DAY	CAR	LVS	NSV	DAR	BRI	TEX	HCY	TAL	NHA	NZH	CLT	DOV	RCH	PPR	GLN	MLW	MYB	CAL	SBO	IRP	MCH	BRI	DAR	RCH	DOV	CLT	GTY; 27	CAR; 38	ATL	HOM; 27		

=== Car No. 42 history ===
==== Kevin Lepage (1997) ====
In 1997, ST fielded the No. 42 Chevy for Kevin Lepage at Homestead. He finished seventeenth.

==== Car No. 42 results ====
Year	Team	No.	Make	1	2	3	4	5	6	7	8	9	10	11	12	13	14	15	16	17	18	19	20	21	22	23	24	25	26	27	28	29	30	Owners	Pts
1997	Kevin Lepage	42	Chevy	DAY	CAR	RCH	ATL	LVS	DAR	HCY	TEX	BRI	NSV	TAL	NHA	NZH	CLT	DOV	SBO	GLN	MLW	MYB	GTY	IRP	MCH	BRI	DAR	RCH	DOV	CLT	CAL	CAR	HOM; 17		

=== Car No. 46 history ===
==== Larry Pearson (1996) ====
The second team in the JTG Daugherty stable made its debut in 1996 at the All Pro Bumper To Bumper 300. The car was No. 46, sponsored by Stanley Tools and driven to a 22nd-place finish by Larry Pearson. Pearson drove two more races for the team that year, each one getting regressively worse.

==== Robert Pressley & Bobby East (2005) ====
In 2005, the No. 46 made a return as a Ford Taurus driven by Robert Pressley and Bobby East part-time.

==== Car No. 46 results ====
Year	Team	No.	Make	1	2	3	4	5	6	7	8	9	10	11	12	13	14	15	16	17	18	19	20	21	22	23	24	25	26	27	28	29	30	31	32	33	34	35	Owners	Pts
1996	Larry Pearson	46	Chevy	DAY	CAR	RCH	ATL	NSV	DAR	BRI	HCY	NZH	CLT	DOV	SBO	MYB	GLN	MLW	NHA	TAL	IRP	MCH	BRI	DAR	RCH	DOV	CLT; 22	CAR; 27	HOM; 37											
2005	Robert Pressley	46	Ford	DAY	CAL	MXC	LVS	ATL	NSS	BRI	TEX	PHO	TAL	DAR; 25	RCH	CLT; DNQ	DOV	NSS	KEN	MLW	DAY	CHI	NHA	PPR	GTY	IRP; 16	GLN	MCH	BRI; 16	CAL	RCH; 33	DOV	KAN	CLT		TEX; 30	PHO	HOM		
2005	Bobby East	46	Ford																																MEM; 17					

=== Car No. 47 history ===
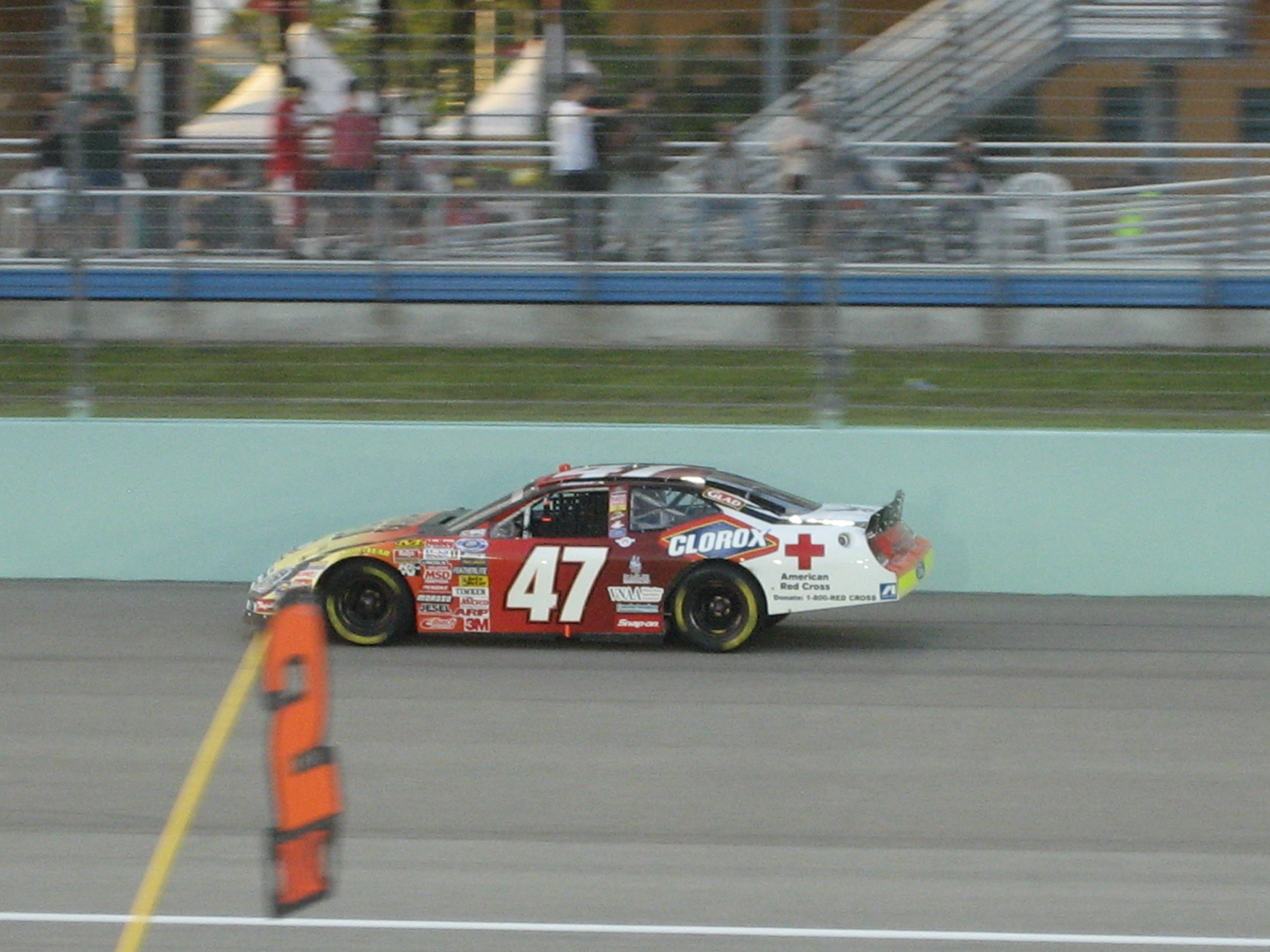
Kelly Bires during the 2007 Ford 300 at the Homestead-Miami Speedway.

==== Jeff Fuller (1995–1997) ====
JTG Daugherty Racing (then known as ST Motorsports and owned by Tad Geschickter and crew chief Steve Plattenberger) made its debut at the 1995 Goody's 300. Jeff Fuller drove the No. 47 Sunoco-sponsored Chevrolet to an eleventh-place finish. Fuller ran the full season with ST, and had six top-ten finishes en route to a tenth-place finish in points. He was named Rookie of the Year for the Busch Series that year. Fuller returned again in 1996. While he dropped seven points in the standings due to missing two races, he had four top-ten finishes and won from the pole at the Food City 250. Fuller was 18th in points after the 1997 GM Goodwrench/Delco Batteries 200, when he was released from the ride and replaced by Robert Pressley. Pressley had two-top fives and finished 32nd in points despite missing half the season.

==== Robert Pressley (2004) ====
ST would not run the No. 47 car again until 2004, when they fielded the Clorox-sponsored Ford Taurus driven by Robert Pressley. Pressley had two top ten finishes that year, and finished fifteenth in points.

==== Jon Wood (2005–2007) ====
Pressley was replaced by rookie Jon Wood in 2005. Wood posted six top-ten finishes and finished fifteenth in overall championship points. He was to continue to drive the No. 47 car in 2007, before medical problems forced him to exit the ride.

==== Kelly Bires (2007–2008) ====
Former American Speed Association champion Kelly Bires took Wood's place for most of the year, garnering two top-ten finishes. Andy Lally took his place on road courses, finishing tenth at Watkins Glen International. Bires drove full-time in 2008.

==== Michael McDowell (2009) ====
In 2009, Michael McDowell started the season with sponsorship from Tom's Snacks where he had three top-ten finishes, but left the team midway through the season after Tom's Snacks left the team. The team became a start and park team, listing ConstructionJobs.com as the sponsor (the sponsorship funded only practice and qualifying). Kelly Bires returned for three races followed by Coleman Pressley at Iowa. Marcos Ambrose ran full races with STP sponsorship the two road course events at Watkins Glen and Montreal, and would go on to win the event at Watkins Glen. Pressley and Chase Miller finished out the season. The team was suspended at the end of the year, and its owners points were sold to Penske Racing.

In 2010, the team returned with Ambrose driving two road course races; at Watkins Glen, where he won the race, and at Montreal where he did not finish the race, due to electrical problems.

==== Car No. 47 results ====
Year	Team	No.	Make	1	2	3	4	5	6	7	8	9	10	11	12	13	14	15	16	17	18	19	20	21	22	23	24	25	26	27	28	29	30	31	32	33	34	35	Owners	Pts
1995	Jeff Fuller	47	Chevy	DAY; 11	CAR; 30	RCH; 16	ATL; 27	NSV; 20	DAR; 22	BRI; 14	HCY; 7	NHA; 22	NZH; 9	CLT; 15	DOV; 28	MYB; 28	GLN; 15	MLW; 22	TAL; 14	SBO; 11	IRP; 10	MCH; 28	BRI; 10	DAR; 18	RCH; 23	DOV; 21	CLT; 4	CAR; 38	HOM; 8											
1996	Jeff Fuller	47	Chevy	DAY; 35	CAR; DNQ	RCH; 24	ATL; DNQ	NSV; 24	DAR; 25	BRI; 10	HCY; 14	NZH; 42	CLT; 16	DOV; 27	SBO; 12	MYB; 15	GLN; 33	MLW; 9	NHA; 22	TAL; 8	IRP; 20	MCH; 26	BRI; 1*	DAR; 15	RCH; 24	DOV; 20	CLT; DNQ	CAR; 20	HOM; 33											
1997	Jeff Fuller	47	Chevy	DAY; 26	CAR; 17	RCH; 35	ATL; 12	LVS; 36	DAR; 7	HCY; 12	TEX; 32	BRI; 29	NSV; 31	TAL; 26	NHA; 3	NZH; 31	CLT; 34	DOV; 26																						
1997	Robert Pressley	47	Chevy																SBO; 31	GLN; 38	MLW; 21	MYB; 32	GTY; 37	IRP; 18	MCH; 35	BRI; 3	DAR; 14	RCH; 15	DOV; 27	CLT; 16	CAL; 5	CAR; 10	HOM; 31							
2004	Robert Pressley	47	Ford	DAY; 17	CAR; 23	LVS; 24	DAR; 22	BRI; 22	TEX; 24	NSS; 11	TAL; 14	CAL; 27	GTY; 36	RCH; 20	NZH; 19	CLT; 20	DOV; 15	NSS; 15	KEN; 16	MLW; 14	DAY; 4	CHI; 35	NHA; 13	PPR; 19	IRP; 22	MCH; 28	BRI; 9	CAL; 25	RCH; 17	DOV; 22	KAN; 20	CLT; 16	MEM; 17	ATL; 13	PHO; 17	DAR; 13	HOM; 24			
2005	Jon Wood	47	Ford	DAY; 31	CAL; 28	MXC; 16	LVS; 17	ATL; 25	NSS; 12	BRI; 11	TEX; 8	PHO; 18	TAL; 2	DAR; 35	RCH; 35	CLT; 33	DOV; 40	NSS; 32	KEN; 10	MLW; 26	DAY; 29	CHI; 37	NHA; 37	PPR; 22	GTY; 21	IRP; 34	GLN; 20	MCH; 19	BRI; 37	CAL; 14	RCH; 17	DOV; 16	KAN; 5	CLT; 7	MEM; 40	TEX; 26	PHO; 33	HOM; 6		
2006	Jon Wood	47	Ford	DAY; 4	CAL; 18	MXC; 27	LVS; 14	ATL; 13	BRI; 17	TEX; 26	NSS; 6	PHO; 23	TAL; 19	RCH; 38	DAR; 33	CLT; 37	DOV; 40	NSS; 8	KEN; 22	MLW; 14	DAY; 34	CHI; 21	NHA; 20	MAR; 21	GTY; 15	IRP; 14	GLN; 29	MCH; 36	BRI; 28	CAL; 8	RCH; 25	DOV; 38	KAN; 15	CLT; 23	MEM; 29	TEX; 12	PHO; 38	HOM; 18		
2007	Jon Wood	47	Ford	DAY; 15	CAL; 31	MXC; 10	LVS; 11	ATL; 36	BRI; 43	NSS; 16	TEX; 38	PHO; 25	TAL; 31	RCH; 21	DAR; 32	CLT; 13																								
2007	Travis Kvapil	47	Ford														DOV; 31																							
2007	Kelly Bires	47	Ford															NSS; 15	KEN; 7	MLW; 30	NHA; 24	DAY; 16	CHI; 24	GTY; 24	IRP; 38			MCH; 32	BRI; 29	CAL; 23	RCH; 26	DOV; 19	KAN; 40	CLT; 9	MEM; 14	TEX; 19	PHO; 22	HOM; 20		
2007	Andy Lally	47	Ford																							CGV; 29	GLN; 10													
2008	Kelly Bires	47	Ford	DAY; 12	CAL; 30	LVS; 15	ATL; 12	BRI; 20	NSS; 5	TEX; 17	PHO; 19	MXC; 31	TAL; 36	RCH; 20	DAR; 24	CLT; 33	DOV; 13	NSS; 8	KEN; 19	MLW; 11	NHA; 22	DAY; 16	CHI; 12	GTY; 32	IRP; 36	CGV; 24	GLN; 17	MCH; 9	BRI; 17	CAL; 13	RCH; 20	DOV; 34	KAN; 10	CLT; 7	MEM; 18	TEX; 22	PHO; 17	HOM; 9		
2009	Michael McDowell	47	Toyota	DAY; 14	CAL; 36	LVS; 6	BRI; 31	TEX; 17	NSS; 15	PHO; 11	TAL; 15	RCH; 8	DAR; 33	CLT; 20	DOV; 11	NSS; 8	KEN; 29	MLW; 14	NHA; 15	DAY; 13												KAN; 39								
2009	Kelly Bires	47	Toyota																		CHI; 40	GTY; 40	IRP; 39																	
2009	Coleman Pressley	47	Toyota																					IOW; 41			BRI; 39			RCH; 41	DOV; 41				MEM; 38					
2009	Marcos Ambrose	47	Toyota																						GLN; 1			CGV; 2*												
2009	Chase Miller	47	Toyota																							MCH; 37			ATL; 39				CAL; 43	CLT; 41		TEX; 39		HOM; 37		
2009	Chris Cook	47	Toyota																																		PHO; 43			
2010	Marcos Ambrose	47	Toyota	DAY	CAL	LVS	BRI	NSS	PHO	TEX	TAL	RCH	DAR	DOV	CLT	NSS	KEN	ROA	NHA	DAY	CHI	GTY	IRP	IOW	GLN; 1	MCH	BRI	CGV; 33	ATL	RCH	DOV	KAN	CAL	CLT	GTY	TEX	PHO	HOM		

=== Car No. 59 history ===
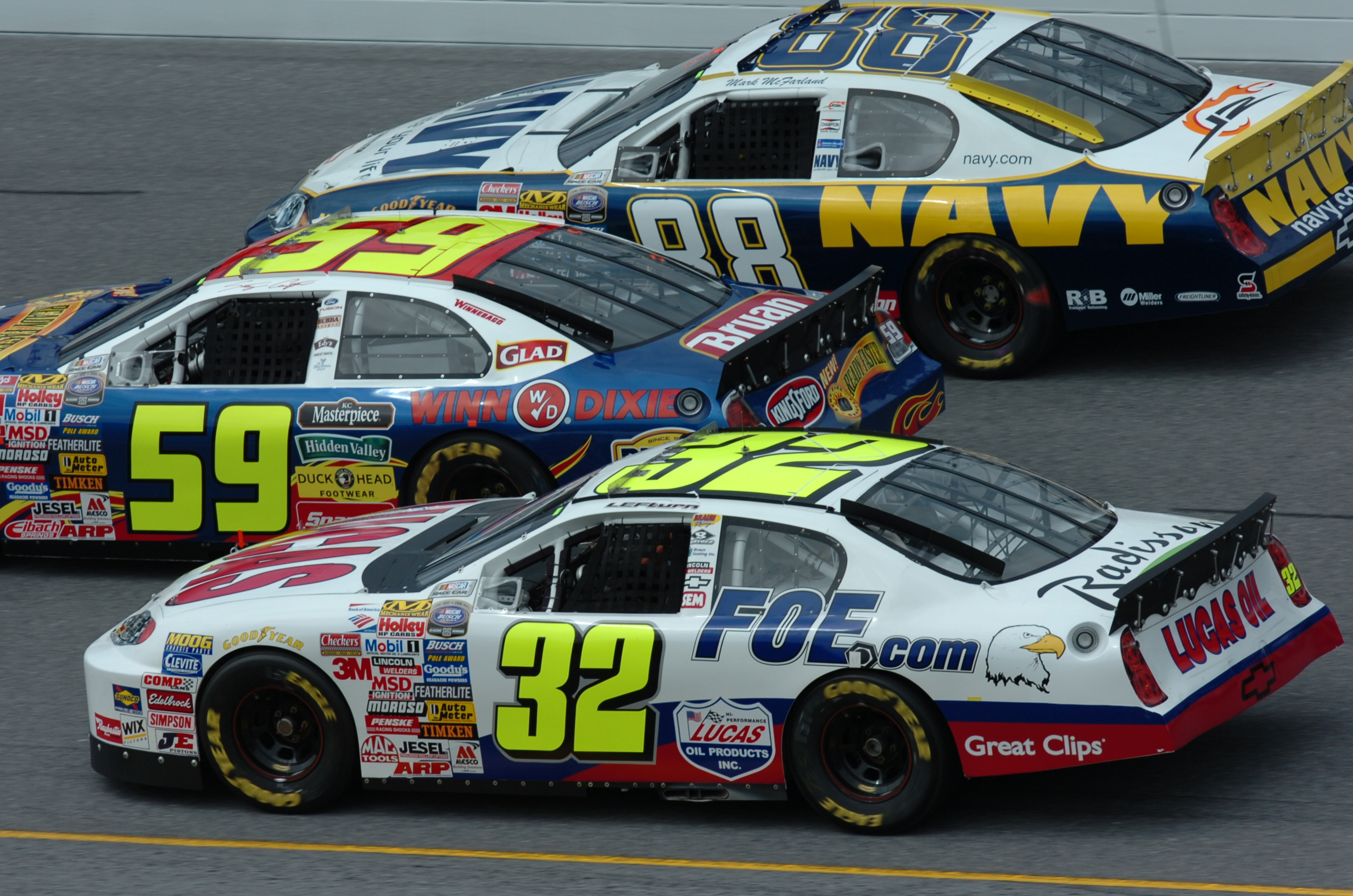
Stacy Compton in The No. 59 car at Daytona in 2006

==== Robert Pressley (1998) ====
In 1998, ST fielded the No. 59 Chevrolet full-time with Robert Pressley as the driver. However, he could run only half the season in the No. 59 due to Winston Cup commitments with Jasper Motorsports. He ran 18 races and had two pole positions, finishing 31st in points with sponsorship from Kingsford. Jimmie Johnson, Kevin Lepage, Ron Hornaday Jr. and Rich Bickle filled in when Pressley was unavailable.

==== Mike Dillon (1999) ====
For 1999, ST hired Mike Dillon as its new driver. Dillon had a seventh-place finish at the Lysol 200 and finished sixteenth in points that year.

==== Phil Parsons (2000) and Rich Bickle (2001) ====
Dillon left for Richard Childress Racing after the season was over and ST replaced him with Phil Parsons. Parsons qualified for all 32 races, had two top-tens and finished 12th in points. In 2001, he was replaced by Bickle again. However, Bickle struggled in the ride and was replaced by Mark Green and Jeff Purvis after the MBNA.com 200.

==== Stacy Compton (2002–2006) ====
In 2002, ST hired Stacy Compton to drive the No. 59, and he remained in the car until the end of the 2006 season. His best finish was second four times, and the best points position was ninth in 2002. The only major change from 2002 until 2007 was the team's switch to the Ford Motor Company in 2004.

==== Marcos Ambrose (2007–2008) ====
Australian driver Marcos Ambrose was hired to compete in the No. 59 during the 2007 season, finishing in the top-ten six times and ending the year sixth in points.

Ambrose won the team's first race in 2008 running an STP-sponsored No. 59 at Watkins Glen. For the 2009 Nationwide Series, the No. 59 team ceased operations, running only the No. 47 entry for numerous drivers, and the owner points going to the No. 12 Penske Dodge driven by Justin Allgaier.

==== Car No. 59 results ====
Year	Team	No.	Make	1	2	3	4	5	6	7	8	9	10	11	12	13	14	15	16	17	18	19	20	21	22	23	24	25	26	27	28	29	30	31	32	33	34	35	Owners	Pts
1998	Robert Pressley	59	Chevy	DAY; 34	CAR; 17	LVS; 38	NSV; 31*	DAR; 9	BRI; DNQ	TEX; DNQ	HCY; 6	TAL; DNQ	NHA; 9		CLT; 26	DOV; 6	RCH; 10					CAL; 14			MCH; 19	BRI; 19	DAR; 9	RCH; 37				CAR; 15	ATL; 31	HOM; 37						
1998	Ron Hornaday Jr.	59	Chevy											NZH; 23				PPR; 8		MLW; 35																				
1998	Jack Baldwin	59	Chevy																GLN; 20																					
1998	Scott Lagasse	59	Chevy																		MYB; 25																			
1998	Kevin Lepage	59	Chevy																				SBO; 10																	
1998	Jimmie Johnson	59	Chevy																					IRP; 25							GTY; 15									
1998	Rich Bickle	59	Chevy																										DOV; 28											
1998	Steve Grissom	59	Chevy																											CLT; 19										
1999	Mike Dillon	59	Chevy	DAY; 18	CAR; 19	LVS; DNQ	ATL; 13	DAR; 34	TEX; 28	NSV; 18	BRI; 32	TAL; 26	CAL; 13	NHA; 32	RCH; 13	NZH; 21	CLT; DNQ	DOV; 16	SBO; 27	GLN; 7	MLW; 35	MYB; 30	PPR; 27	GTY; 31	IRP; 23	MCH; 19	BRI; 23	DAR; 31	RCH; 27	DOV; 13	CLT; 12	CAR; 33	MEM; 18	PHO; 37	HOM; 27					
2000	Phil Parsons	59	Chevy	DAY; 13	CAR; 23	LVS; 14	ATL; 14	DAR; 20	BRI; 17	TEX; 34	NSV; 29	TAL; 23	CAL; 24	RCH; 10	NHA; 12	CLT; 24	DOV; 29	SBO; 15	MYB; 27	GLN; 25	MLW; 42	NZH; 20	PPR; 5	GTY; 23	IRP; 22	MCH; 19	BRI; 14	DAR; 17	RCH; 39	DOV; 15	CLT; 31	CAR; 22	MEM; 19	PHO; 26	HOM; 19					
2001	Rich Bickle	59	Chevy	DAY; 16	CAR; 7	LVS; 15	ATL; 29	DAR; 15	BRI; 39	TEX; 23	NSS; 12	TAL; 13	CAL; 29	RCH; 16	NHA; 21	NZH; 8	CLT; 17	DOV; 26	KEN; 27	MLW; 12	GLN; 22	CHI; 28			IRP; 9	MCH; 29	BRI; 20	DAR; 25	RCH; 16	DOV; 24										
2001	Mike Chase	59	Chevy																				GTY; 27	PPR; 28																
2001	Mark Green	59	Chevy																												KAN; 9	CLT; 29								
2001	Jeff Purvis	59	Chevy																														MEM; 5	PHO; 17	CAR; 14					
2001	Stacy Compton	59	Chevy																																	HOM; 10				
2002	Stacy Compton	59	Chevy	DAY; 20	CAR; 22	LVS; 10	DAR; 10	BRI; 36	TEX; 11	NSS; 9	TAL; 2	CAL; 3	RCH; 12	NHA; 27	NZH; 13	CLT; 17	DOV; 21	NSS; 13	KEN; 17	MLW; 33	DAY; 10	CHI; 32	GTY; 31	PPR; 10	IRP; 16	MCH; 8	BRI; 34	DAR; 21	RCH; 18	DOV; 15	KAN; 12	CLT; 16	MEM; 2	ATL; 11	CAR; 5	PHO; 2	HOM; 13			
2003	Stacy Compton	59	Chevy	DAY; 38	CAR; 22	LVS; 15	DAR; 4	BRI; 15	TEX; 16	TAL; 32	NSS; 31	CAL; 21	RCH; 7	GTY; 6	NZH; 8	CLT; 18	DOV; 29	NSS; 28	KEN; 4	MLW; 9	DAY; 19	CHI; 19	NHA; 10	PPR; 6	IRP; 3	MCH; 17	BRI; 29	DAR; 8	RCH; 15	DOV; 12	KAN; 8	CLT; 23	MEM; 11	ATL; 23	PHO; 35	CAR; 16	HOM; 21			
2004	Stacy Compton	59	Ford	DAY; 31	CAR; 20	LVS; 17	DAR; 15	BRI; 19	TEX; 28	NSS; 14	TAL; 23	CAL; 3	GTY; 20	RCH; 18	NZH; 12	CLT; 26	DOV; 17	NSS; 10	KEN; 19	MLW; 20	DAY; 42	CHI; 21	NHA; 8	PPR; 2	IRP; 18	MCH; 31	BRI; 11	CAL; 24	RCH; 32	DOV; 29	KAN; 9	CLT; 26	MEM; 16	ATL; 17	PHO; 23	DAR; 20	HOM; 15			
2005	Stacy Compton	59	Ford	DAY; 23	CAL; 16	MXC; 28	LVS; 38	ATL; 41	NSS; 10	BRI; 16	TEX; 23	PHO; 19	TAL; 25	DAR; 31	RCH; 39	CLT; 26	DOV; 15	NSS; 16	KEN; 8	MLW; 25	DAY; 13	CHI; 28	NHA; 33	PPR; 9	GTY; 20	IRP; 12	GLN; 27	MCH; 28	BRI; 15	CAL; 32	RCH; 16	DOV; 18	KAN; 29	CLT; 20	MEM; 22	TEX; 37	PHO; 17	HOM; 17		
2006	Stacy Compton	59	Ford	DAY; 27	CAL; 24	MXC; 43	LVS; 33	ATL; 27	BRI; 14	TEX; 22	NSS; 20	PHO; 26	TAL; 26	RCH; 37	DAR; 14	CLT; 30	DOV; 12	NSS; 19	KEN; 24	MLW; 6	DAY; 20	CHI; 20	NHA; 25	MAR; 15	GTY; 17	IRP; 12	GLN; 30	MCH; 41	BRI; 16	CAL; 18	RCH; 34	DOV; 20	KAN; 34	CLT; 3	MEM; 24	TEX; 22	PHO; 22	HOM; 17		
2007	Marcos Ambrose	59	Ford	DAY; 16	CAL; 25	MXC; 8	LVS; 10	ATL; 28	BRI; 28	NSS; 17	TEX; 31	PHO; 22	TAL; 25	RCH; 26	DAR; 19	CLT; 20	DOV; 6	NSS; 36	KEN; 11	MLW; 15	NHA; 30	DAY; 35	CHI; 37	GTY; 18	IRP; 32	CGV; 7	GLN; 13	MCH; 19	BRI; 37	CAL; 13	RCH; 15	DOV; 20	KAN; 39	CLT; 40	MEM; 4	TEX; 30	PHO; 15	HOM; 10		
2008	Marcos Ambrose	59	Ford	DAY; 39	CAL; 22	LVS; 28	ATL; 11	BRI; 19	NSS; 23	TEX; 18	PHO; 17	MXC; 2	TAL; 28	RCH; 25	DAR; 10	CLT; 14	DOV; 30	NSS; 19	KEN; 6	MLW; 16	NHA; 14	DAY; 20	CHI; 15	GTY; 15	IRP; 20	CGV; 3	GLN; 1	MCH; 12	BRI; 34	CAL; 15	RCH; 13	DOV; 16	KAN; 11	CLT; 15	MEM; 15	TEX; 9	PHO; 24	HOM; 31		

=== Car No. 97 history ===
==== Ron Hornaday Jr. (1998) ====
In 1998, ST fielded the No. 97 Chevy for Ron Hornaday Jr. at Fontana. He finished 22nd.

==== Car No. 97 results ====
Year	Team	No.	Make	1	2	3	4	5	6	7	8	9	10	11	12	13	14	15	16	17	18	19	20	21	22	23	24	25	26	27	28	29	30	31	Owners	Pts
1998	Ron Hornaday Jr.	97	Chevy	DAY	CAR	LVS	NSV	DAR	BRI	TEX	HCY	TAL	NHA	NZH	CLT	DOV	RCH	PPR	GLN	MLW	MYB	CAL; 22	SBO	IRP	MCH	BRI	DAR	RCH	DOV	CLT	GTY	CAR	ATL	HOM		

== Craftsman Truck Series ==
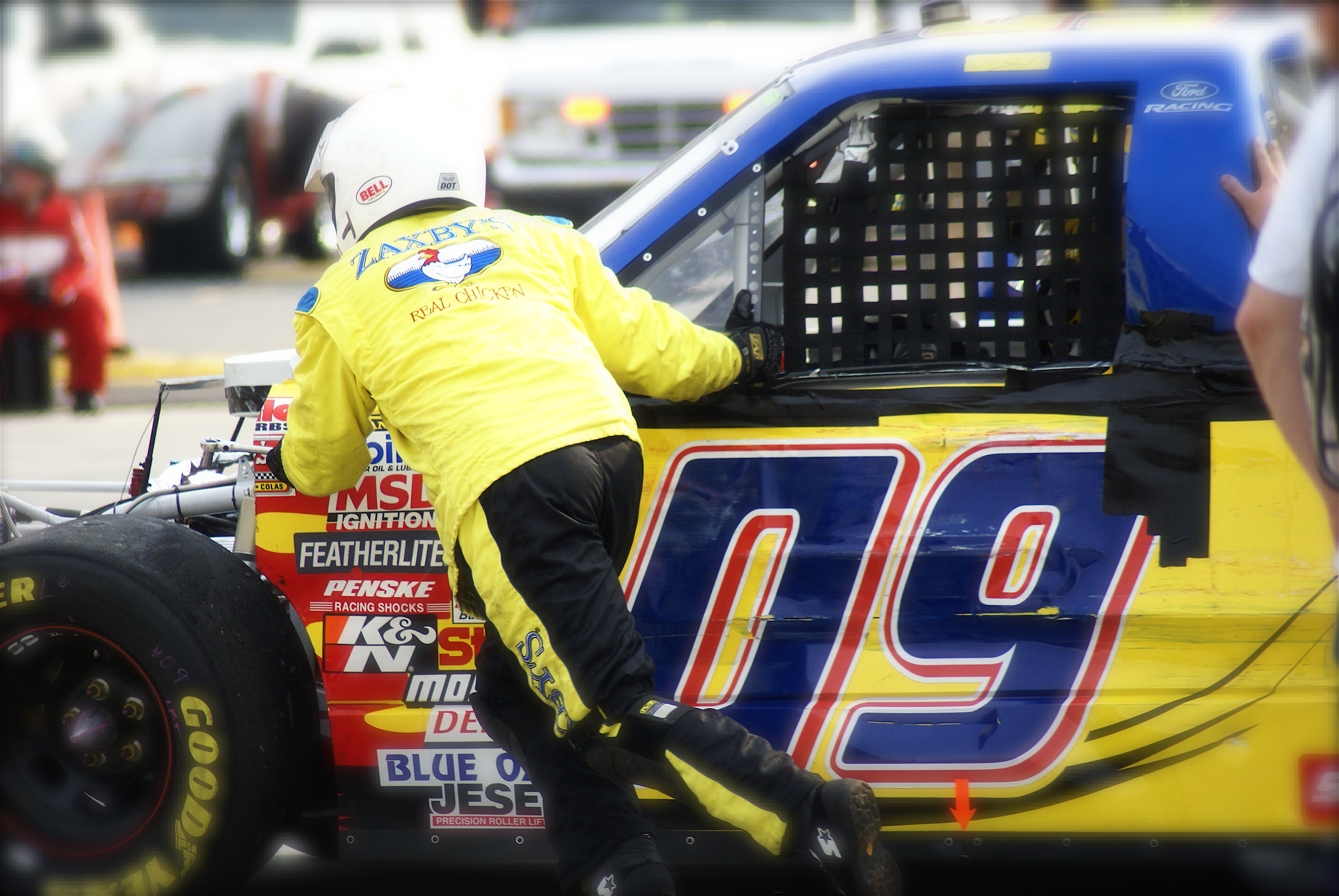
The No. 09 truck after a wreck in Martinsville Speedway in 2007.

The No. 20 truck made its debut in 2006 at the GM Flex Fuel 250, sponsored by the United States Air Force in partnership with JTG Racing. Jon Wood drove the truck at Daytona and Fontana, finishing sixteenth and ninth, respectively. Bobby East competed in one race at Atlanta, where he finished 23rd. For the remainder of the season, JTG Racing development driver Marcos Ambrose took over, earning one pole position and two third-place finishes. In 2007 the truck's number changed to No. 09. Joey Clanton, who brought Zaxby’s as a sponsor, shared driving duties with former Busch Series veteran Stacy Compton. Clanton went on and win ROTY that year despite only running a few races.

A year later, in 2008, Clanton brought both the No. 09 and Zaxby's sponsorship to Roush Fenway Racing, which allowed JTG Racing/Wood Brothers to revert to using the No. 20. However, the truck team only lasted for eight races before shutting down due to a lack of funding.

== Sponsorship ==
JTG Daugherty Racing had maintained long-term relationships with sponsors Clorox and Kingsford and their associated company since their time in the Busch series, and the two often appeared on the decklid of the car, even in races they were not the primary sponsor. The team had also maintained good relations with Bush's Baked Beans and more recent partners Kroger, Kimberly-Clark (Kleenex, Scott Products, Viva) and Charter Communications through several driver and manufacturer changes, and have been able to attract new sponsors every season. Kroger wanted to return to the newly renamed HYAK Motorsports, but HYAK Motorsports wanted to start fresh with newer sponsors. On November 19, 2024, RFK Racing announced the acquisition of former Stewart–Haas Racing driver Ryan Preece and the subsequent addition of Kroger as a primary sponsorship driver, thus ending the sponsorship deal between Kroger and JTGDR.
