= 2020 Pocono Organics 325 =

NASCAR Cup Series race

Race details
- Race 14 of 36 in the 2020 NASCAR Cup Series
- 2020 Pocono Organics 325 program cover
- Date: June 27, 2020
- Location: Pocono Raceway in Long Pond, Pennsylvania
- Course: Permanent racing facility
- Course length: 4 km (2.5 miles)
- Distance: 130 laps, 325 mi (523 km)
- Average speed: 134.467 miles per hour (216.404 km/h)

Pole position
Driver	Aric Almirola	Stewart-Haas Racing
- Grid positions set by ballot

Most laps led
Driver	Aric Almirola	Stewart-Haas Racing
- Laps: 61

Winner
No. 4	Kevin Harvick	Stewart-Haas Racing

Television in the United States
- Network: Fox
- Announcers: Mike Joy and Jeff Gordon
- Nielsen ratings: 2.570 million

Radio in the United States
- Radio: MRN
- Booth announcers: Alex Hayden and Jeff Striegle
- Turn announcers: Dave Moody (1), Mike Bagley (2) and Kurt Becker (3)

The 2020 Pocono Organics 325 was a NASCAR Cup Series race held on June 27, 2020 at Pocono Raceway in Long Pond, Pennsylvania. Contested over 130 laps on the 2.5-mile (4.0 km) triangular racecourse, it was the 14th race of the 2020 NASCAR Cup Series season.

== Entry list ==
- (R) denotes rookie driver.
- (i) denotes driver who are ineligible for series driver points.

No.	Driver	Team	Manufacturer
00	Quin Houff (R)	StarCom Racing	Chevrolet
1	Kurt Busch	Chip Ganassi Racing	Chevrolet
2	Brad Keselowski	Team Penske	Ford
3	Austin Dillon	Richard Childress Racing	Chevrolet
4	Kevin Harvick	Stewart-Haas Racing	Ford
6	Ryan Newman	Roush Fenway Racing	Ford
7	Josh Bilicki (i)	Tommy Baldwin Racing	Chevrolet
8	Tyler Reddick (R)	Richard Childress Racing	Chevrolet
9	Chase Elliott	Hendrick Motorsports	Chevrolet
10	Aric Almirola	Stewart-Haas Racing	Ford
11	Denny Hamlin	Joe Gibbs Racing	Toyota
12	Ryan Blaney	Team Penske	Ford
13	Ty Dillon	Germain Racing	Chevrolet
14	Clint Bowyer	Stewart-Haas Racing	Ford
15	Brennan Poole (R)	Premium Motorsports	Chevrolet
17	Chris Buescher	Roush Fenway Racing	Ford
18	Kyle Busch	Joe Gibbs Racing	Toyota
19	Martin Truex Jr.	Joe Gibbs Racing	Toyota
20	Erik Jones	Joe Gibbs Racing	Toyota
21	Matt DiBenedetto	Wood Brothers Racing	Ford
22	Joey Logano	Team Penske	Ford
24	William Byron	Hendrick Motorsports	Chevrolet
27	J. J. Yeley (i)	Rick Ware Racing	Ford
32	Corey LaJoie	Go Fas Racing	Ford
34	Michael McDowell	Front Row Motorsports	Ford
37	Ryan Preece	JTG Daugherty Racing	Chevrolet
38	John Hunter Nemechek (R)	Front Row Motorsports	Ford
41	Cole Custer (R)	Stewart-Haas Racing	Ford
42	Matt Kenseth	Chip Ganassi Racing	Chevrolet
43	Bubba Wallace	Richard Petty Motorsports	Chevrolet
47	Ricky Stenhouse Jr.	JTG Daugherty Racing	Chevrolet
48	Jimmie Johnson	Hendrick Motorsports	Chevrolet
51	Joey Gase (i)	Petty Ware Racing	Ford
53	Garrett Smithley (i)	Rick Ware Racing	Chevrolet
66	Timmy Hill (i)	MBM Motorsports	Toyota
77	James Davison	Spire Motorsports	Chevrolet
78	B. J. McLeod (i)	B. J. McLeod Motorsports	Chevrolet
88	Alex Bowman	Hendrick Motorsports	Chevrolet
95	Christopher Bell (R)	Leavine Family Racing	Toyota
96	Daniel Suárez	Gaunt Brothers Racing	Toyota
Official entry list

== Qualifying ==
Aric Almirola was awarded the pole for the race as determined by a random draw.

=== Starting Lineup ===
Pos	No.	Driver	Team	Manufacturer
1	10	Aric Almirola	Stewart-Haas Racing	Ford
2	12	Ryan Blaney	Team Penske	Ford
3	11	Denny Hamlin	Joe Gibbs Racing	Toyota
4	18	Kyle Busch	Joe Gibbs Racing	Toyota
5	9	Chase Elliott	Hendrick Motorsports	Chevrolet
6	22	Joey Logano	Team Penske	Ford
7	1	Kurt Busch	Chip Ganassi Racing	Chevrolet
8	2	Brad Keselowski	Team Penske	Ford
9	4	Kevin Harvick	Stewart-Haas Racing	Ford
10	88	Alex Bowman	Hendrick Motorsports	Chevrolet
11	19	Martin Truex Jr.	Joe Gibbs Racing	Toyota
12	48	Jimmie Johnson	Hendrick Motorsports	Chevrolet
13	6	Ryan Newman	Roush Fenway Racing	Ford
14	47	Ricky Stenhouse Jr.	JTG Daugherty Racing	Chevrolet
15	8	Tyler Reddick (R)	Richard Childress Racing	Chevrolet
16	24	William Byron	Hendrick Motorsports	Chevrolet
17	3	Austin Dillon	Richard Childress Racing	Chevrolet
18	14	Clint Bowyer	Stewart-Haas Racing	Ford
19	20	Erik Jones	Joe Gibbs Racing	Toyota
20	38	John Hunter Nemechek (R)	Front Row Motorsports	Ford
21	21	Matt DiBenedetto	Wood Brothers Racing	Ford
22	42	Matt Kenseth	Chip Ganassi Racing	Chevrolet
23	43	Bubba Wallace	Richard Petty Motorsports	Chevrolet
24	17	Chris Buescher	Roush Fenway Racing	Ford
25	41	Cole Custer (R)	Stewart-Haas Racing	Ford
26	34	Michael McDowell	Front Row Motorsports	Ford
27	15	Brennan Poole (R)	Premium Motorsports	Chevrolet
28	51	Joey Gase (i)	Petty Ware Racing	Ford
29	32	Corey LaJoie	Go Fas Racing	Ford
30	37	Ryan Preece	JTG Daugherty Racing	Chevrolet
31	53	Garrett Smithley (i)	Rick Ware Racing	Chevrolet
32	00	Quin Houff (R)	StarCom Racing	Chevrolet
33	27	J. J. Yeley (i)	Rick Ware Racing	Ford
34	13	Ty Dillon	Germain Racing	Chevrolet
35	77	James Davison	Spire Motorsports	Chevrolet
36	95	Christopher Bell (R)	Leavine Family Racing	Toyota
37	96	Daniel Suárez	Gaunt Brothers Racing	Toyota
38	66	Timmy Hill (i)	MBM Motorsports	Toyota
39	78	B. J. McLeod (i)	B. J. McLeod Motorsports	Chevrolet
40	7	Josh Bilicki (i)	Tommy Baldwin Racing	Chevrolet
Official starting lineup

== Race ==
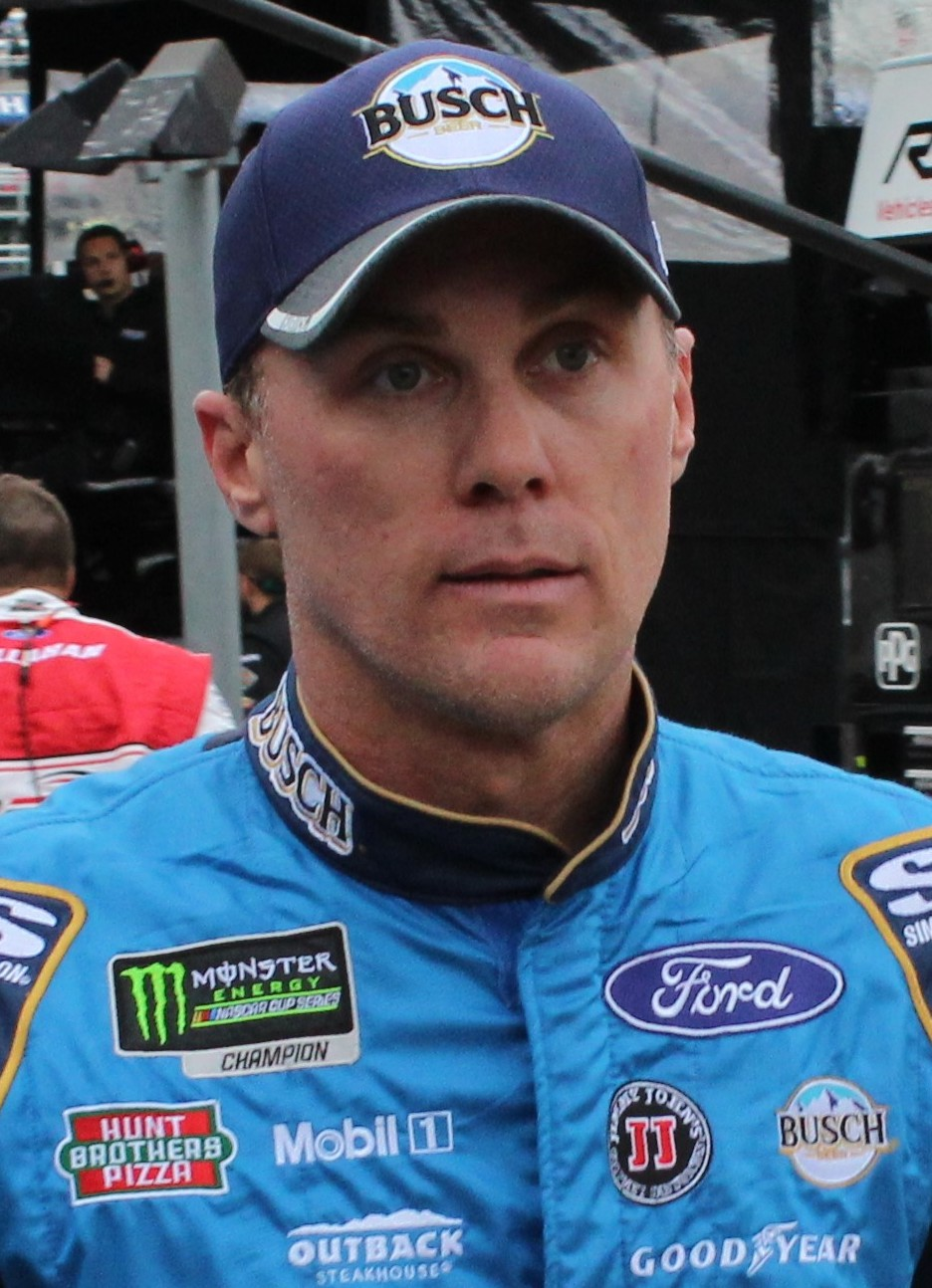
Kevin Harvick won the race.

=== Stage Results ===
Stage One Laps: 25

Pos	No	Driver	Team	Manufacturer	Points
1	22	Joey Logano	Team Penske	Ford	10
2	10	Aric Almirola	Stewart-Haas Racing	Ford	9
3	12	Ryan Blaney	Team Penske	Ford	8
4	18	Kyle Busch	Joe Gibbs Racing	Toyota	7
5	9	Chase Elliott	Hendrick Motorsports	Chevrolet	6
6	1	Kurt Busch	Chip Ganassi Racing	Chevrolet	5
7	21	Matt Dibenedetto	Wood Brothers Racing	Ford	4
8	2	Brad Keselowski	Team Penske	Ford	3
9	88	Alex Bowman	Hendrick Motorsports	Chevrolet	2
10	20	Erik Jones	Joe Gibbs Racing	Toyota	1
Official stage one results

Stage Two Laps: 52

Pos	No	Driver	Team	Manufacturer	Points
1	10	Aric Almirola	Stewart-Haas Racing	Ford	10
2	22	Joey Logano	Team Penske	Ford	9
3	19	Martin Truex Jr.	Joe Gibbs Racing	Toyota	8
4	12	Ryan Blaney	Team Penske	Ford	7
5	21	Matt DiBenedetto	Wood Brothers Racing	Ford	6
6	88	Alex Bowman	Hendrick Motorsports	Chevrolet	5
7	4	Kevin Harvick	Stewart-Haas Racing	Ford	4
8	18	Kyle Busch	Joe Gibbs Racing	Toyota	3
9	11	Denny Hamlin	Joe Gibbs Racing	Toyota	2
10	9	Chase Elliott	Hendrick Motorsports	Chevrolet	1
Official stage two results

=== Final Stage Results ===
Stage Three Laps: 53

Pos	Grid	No	Driver	Team	Manufacturer	Laps	Points
1	9	4	Kevin Harvick	Stewart-Haas Racing	Ford	130	44
2	3	11	Denny Hamlin	Joe Gibbs Racing	Toyota	130	37
3	1	10	Aric Almirola	Stewart-Haas Racing	Ford	130	53
4	36	95	Christopher Bell (R)	Leavine Family Racing	Toyota	130	33
5	4	18	Kyle Busch	Joe Gibbs Racing	Toyota	130	42
6	11	19	Martin Truex Jr.	Joe Gibbs Racing	Toyota	130	39
7	18	14	Clint Bowyer	Stewart-Haas Racing	Ford	130	30
8	26	34	Michael McDowell	Front Row Motorsports	Ford	130	29
9	8	2	Brad Keselowski	Team Penske	Ford	130	31
10	24	17	Chris Buescher	Roush Fenway Racing	Ford	130	27
11	22	42	Matt Kenseth	Chip Ganassi Racing	Chevrolet	130	26
12	2	12	Ryan Blaney	Team Penske	Ford	130	40
13	21	21	Matt DiBenedetto	Wood Brothers Racing	Ford	130	34
14	16	24	William Byron	Hendrick Motorsports	Chevrolet	130	23
15	13	6	Ryan Newman	Roush Fenway Racing	Ford	130	22
16	25	41	Cole Custer (R)	Stewart-Haas Racing	Ford	130	21
17	14	47	Ricky Stenhouse Jr.	JTG Daugherty Racing	Chevrolet	130	20
18	7	1	Kurt Busch	Chip Ganassi Racing	Chevrolet	130	24
19	17	3	Austin Dillon	Richard Childress Racing	Chevrolet	130	18
20	30	37	Ryan Preece	JTG Daugherty Racing	Chevrolet	130	17
21	12	48	Jimmie Johnson	Hendrick Motorsports	Chevrolet	130	16
22	23	43	Bubba Wallace	Richard Petty Motorsports	Chevrolet	129	15
23	29	32	Corey LaJoie	Go Fas Racing	Ford	129	14
24	20	38	John Hunter Nemechek (R)	Front Row Motorsports	Ford	129	13
25	5	9	Chase Elliott	Hendrick Motorsports	Chevrolet	129	19
26	34	13	Ty Dillon	Germain Racing	Chevrolet	129	11
27	10	88	Alex Bowman	Hendrick Motorsports	Chevrolet	129	17
28	37	96	Daniel Suárez	Gaunt Brothers Racing	Toyota	128	9
29	27	15	Brennan Poole (R)	Premium Motorsports	Chevrolet	127	8
30	15	8	Tyler Reddick (R)	Richard Childress Racing	Chevrolet	126	7
31	33	27	J. J. Yeley (i)	Rick Ware Racing	Ford	125	0
32	40	7	Josh Bilicki (i)	Tommy Baldwin Racing	Chevrolet	125	0
33	31	53	Garrett Smithley (i)	Rick Ware Racing	Chevrolet	125	0
34	35	77	James Davison	Spire Motorsports	Chevrolet	125	3
35	38	66	Timmy Hill (i)	MBM Motorsports	Toyota	125	0
36	6	22	Joey Logano	Team Penske	Ford	124	20
37	28	51	Joey Gase (i)	Petty Ware Racing	Ford	121	0
38	19	20	Erik Jones	Joe Gibbs Racing	Toyota	70	2
39	39	78	B. J. McLeod (i)	B. J. McLeod Motorsports	Chevrolet	36	0
40	32	00	Quin Houff (R)	StarCom Racing	Chevrolet	19	1
Official race results

=== Race statistics ===
- Lead changes: 10 among 8 different drivers
- Cautions/Laps: 6 for 21
- Red flags: 0
- Time of race: 2 hours, 21 minutes and 1 second
- Average speed: 134.467 miles per hour (216.404 km/h)

== Media ==
=== Television ===
Fox Sports televised the race in the United States on Fox. Mike Joy and six-time Pocono winner Jeff Gordon will cover the race from the Fox Sports studio in Charlotte. Matt Yocum handled the pit road duties. Larry McReynolds provided insight from the Fox Sports studio in Charlotte.

Fox
Booth announcers	Pit reporter	In-race analyst
Lap-by-lap: Mike Joy; Color-commentator: Jeff Gordon	Matt Yocum	Larry McReynolds

=== Radio ===
MRN had the radio call for the race which was also simulcast on Sirius XM NASCAR Radio. Alex Hayden, Jeff Striegle called the race in the booth when the field raced through the tri-oval. Dave Moody called the race from the Sunoco spotters stand outside turn 2 when the field raced through turns 1 and 2. Mike Bagley called the race from a platform inside the backstretch when the field raced down the backstretch. Kyle Rickey called the race from the Sunoco spotters stand outside turn 4 when the field raced through turns 3 and 4. Steve Post and Kim Coon worked pit road for the radio side.

MRN Radio
Booth announcers	Turn announcers	Pit reporters
Lead announcer: Alex Hayden; Announcer: Jeff Striegle	Turns 1 & 2: Dave Moody; Backstretch: Mike Bagley; Turns 3 & 4: Kyle Rickey	Steve Post; Kim Coon

== Standings after the race ==
Drivers' Championship standings

	Pos	Driver	Points
	1	Kevin Harvick	534
1	2	Ryan Blaney	505 (–29)
1	3	Joey Logano	487 (–47)
	4	Chase Elliott	477 (–57)
	5	Brad Keselowski	472 (–62)
	6	Denny Hamlin	465 (–69)
	7	Martin Truex Jr.	463 (–71)
	8	Alex Bowman	436 (–98)
	9	Kyle Busch	420 (–114)
	10	Kurt Busch	393 (–141)
1	11	Aric Almirola	390 (–144)
1	12	Jimmie Johnson	369 (–165)
	13	Clint Bowyer	358 (–176)
1	14	Matt DiBenedetto	346 (–188)
1	15	William Byron	342 (–192)
	16	Tyler Reddick	313 (–221)
Official driver's standings

Manufacturers' Championship standings

Pos	Manufacturer	Points
1	Ford	524
2	Toyota	487 (–37)
3	Chevrolet	469 (–55)

- Note: Only the first 16 positions are included for the driver standings.
- . – Driver has clinched a position in the NASCAR Cup Series playoffs.

Previous race: 2020 GEICO 500	NASCAR Cup Series; 2020 season	Next race: 2020 Pocono 350
