= 2027 Wheatley Vodka Clash =

Non-points exhibition NASCAR race

Race details
- Race 1 of 2 exhibition races in the 2027 NASCAR Cup Series
- Date: February 13, 2027
- Location: Daytona International Speedway in Daytona Beach, Florida
- Course: Permanent racing facility
- Course length: 2.5 miles (4 km)
- Distance: 70 laps, 175 mi (281.635 km)

Television in the United States
- Network: Fox
- Announcers: Mike Joy, Clint Bowyer, and Kevin Harvick

Radio in the United States
- Radio: MRN
- Booth announcers: Alex Hayden and Mike Bagley
- Turn announcers: Dan Hubbard (Backstretch)

The 2027 Wheatley Vodka Clash is an upcoming non-championship exhibition NASCAR Cup Series race that will be held on February 13, 2027, at Daytona International Speedway in Daytona Beach, Florida. Contested over 75 laps, it will be the first exhibition race of the 2027 NASCAR Cup Series season.

== Report ==
=== Background ===
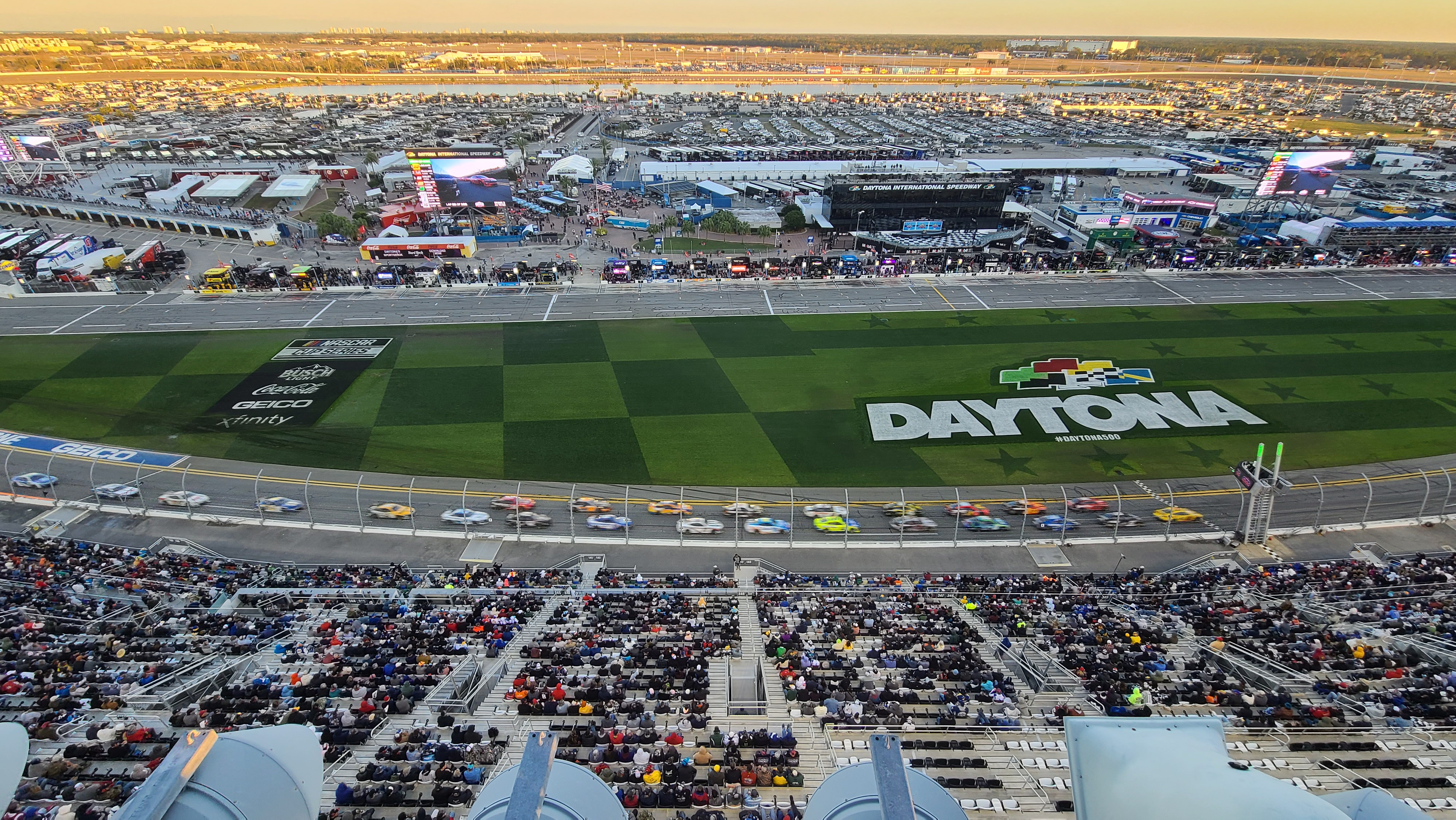
View of cars racing on the front stretch at the 2024 Daytona 500

Daytona International Speedway is one of three superspeedways to hold NASCAR races, the other two being Atlanta Motor Speedway and Talladega Superspeedway. The standard track at Daytona International Speedway is a four-turn superspeedway that is 2.5 miles (4.0 km) long. The track's turns are banked at 31 degrees, while the front stretch, the location of the finish line, is banked at 18 degrees.

Previously held at Bowman Gray Stadium, this will be the first Clash event held at Daytona since 2021 and the first on the oval configuration since 2020.

Daytona announced on October 22, 2025, that the 2027 Daytona 500 would be held on February 21, 2027, to avoid a conflict with the Super Bowl rather than its traditional Presidents' Day weekend. The Clash would be held the day before the Super Bowl.

Only eligible drivers are 2026 Pole Award winners, 2026 Race Winners, previous DAYTONA 500 champions who raced fulltime in 2026, past NASCAR Cup Series champions who raced fulltime in 2026 and one dodge driver.

==== Entry list ====
Ryan Preece, the defending race winner, took his victory in the final laps.

No.	Driver	Team	Manufacturer	Eligibility
1	Ross Chastain	Trackhouse Racing	Chevrolet	Pole winner
2	Austin Cindric	Team Penske	Ford	Past Daytona 500 champion
3	Austin Dillon	Richard Childress Racing	Chevrolet	Past Daytona 500 champion
5	Kyle Larson	Hendrick Motorsports	Chevrolet	Race winner and past champion
6	Ryan Preece	RFK Racing	Ford	Race winner
7	Daniel Suárez	Spire Motorsports	Chevrolet	Race winner
9	Chase Elliott	Hendrick Motorsports	Chevrolet	Race winner and past champion
11	Denny Hamlin	Joe Gibbs Racing	Toyota	Pole winner, race winner, and past Daytona 500 champion
12	Ryan Blaney	Team Penske	Ford	Pole winner, race winner, and past champion
19	Chase Briscoe	Joe Gibbs Racing	Toyota	Pole winner and race winner
20	Christopher Bell	Joe Gibbs Racing	Toyota	Pole winner and race winner
22	Joey Logano	Team Penske	Ford	Pole winner, race winner, and past Daytona 500 champion
24	William Byron	Hendrick Motorsports	Chevrolet	Past Daytona 500 champion
45	Tyler Reddick	23XI Racing	Toyota	Pole winner, race winner, and past Daytona 500 champion
47	Ricky Stenhouse Jr.	Hyak Motorsports	Chevrolet	Past Daytona 500 champion
54	Ty Gibbs	Joe Gibbs Racing	Toyota	Pole winner and race winner
67	Corey Heim	23XI Racing	Toyota	Race winner
71	Michael McDowell	Spire Motorsports	Chevrolet	Past Daytona 500 champion
77	Carson Hocevar	Spire Motorsports	Chevrolet	Pole winner and race winner
97	Shane van Gisbergen	Trackhouse Racing	Chevrolet	Race winner
TBA	Brad Keselowski	TBA	TBA	Past champion
TBA	TBA	Kaulig Racing	Dodge	Dodge full-time driver

== Media ==
=== Television ===
Fox will cover the race on the television side. Mike Joy, Clint Bowyer, and three-time Clash winner Kevin Harvick will handle the call in the booth for the race. Jamie Little and Regan Smith will handle the pit road duties, and Larry McReynolds will provide insight on-site during the race.

FS1
Booth announcers	Pit reporters	In-race analyst
Lap-by-lap: Mike Joy; Color-commentator: Clint Bowyer; Color-commentator: Kevin Harvick	Jamie Little; Regan Smith	Larry McReynolds

=== Radio ===
MRN will cover the radio call for the race, which will also be simulcast on Sirius XM NASCAR Radio. Alex Hayden and Mike Bagley will call the action from the broadcast booth when the field raced down the front straightaway. Dan Hubbard will call the action for MRN when the field raced down the backstretch. Steve Post, Brienne Pedigo, and Jason Toy will cover the action for MRN on pit lane.

MRN Radio
Booth announcers	Turn announcers	Pit reporters
Lead announcer: Alex Hayden; Announcer: Mike Bagley	Backstretch: Dan Hubbard	Steve Post; Brienne Pedigo; Jason Toy

Previous race: 2026 Season Finale 400 (points)	NASCAR Cup Series; 2027 season	Next race: 2027 The Duel at Daytona (exhibition)
