= 2027 The Duel at Daytona =

NASCAR Duels at Daytona International Speedway in 2027

Race details
- Date: February 18, 2027
- Location: Daytona International Speedway; Daytona Beach, Florida
- Course: Permanent racing facility 2.5 mi (4 km)
- Distance: Race 1: 60 laps, 150 mi (240 km); Race 2: 60 laps, 150 mi (240 km)

Television
- Network: FS1 & MRN
- Announcers: Mike Joy, Clint Bowyer, and Kevin Harvick (Television); Alex Hayden, and Rusty Wallace (Booth); Dave Moody (1 & 2), Mike Bagley (Backstretch), and Kyle Rickey (3 & 4) (Turns) (Radio)

The 2027 The Duel at Daytona are an upcoming pair of NASCAR Cup Series stock car races that will be held on February 18, 2027, at Daytona International Speedway in Daytona Beach, Florida. Both will be contested over 60 laps, they will be the qualifying races for the 2027 Daytona 500.

== Report ==
=== Background ===
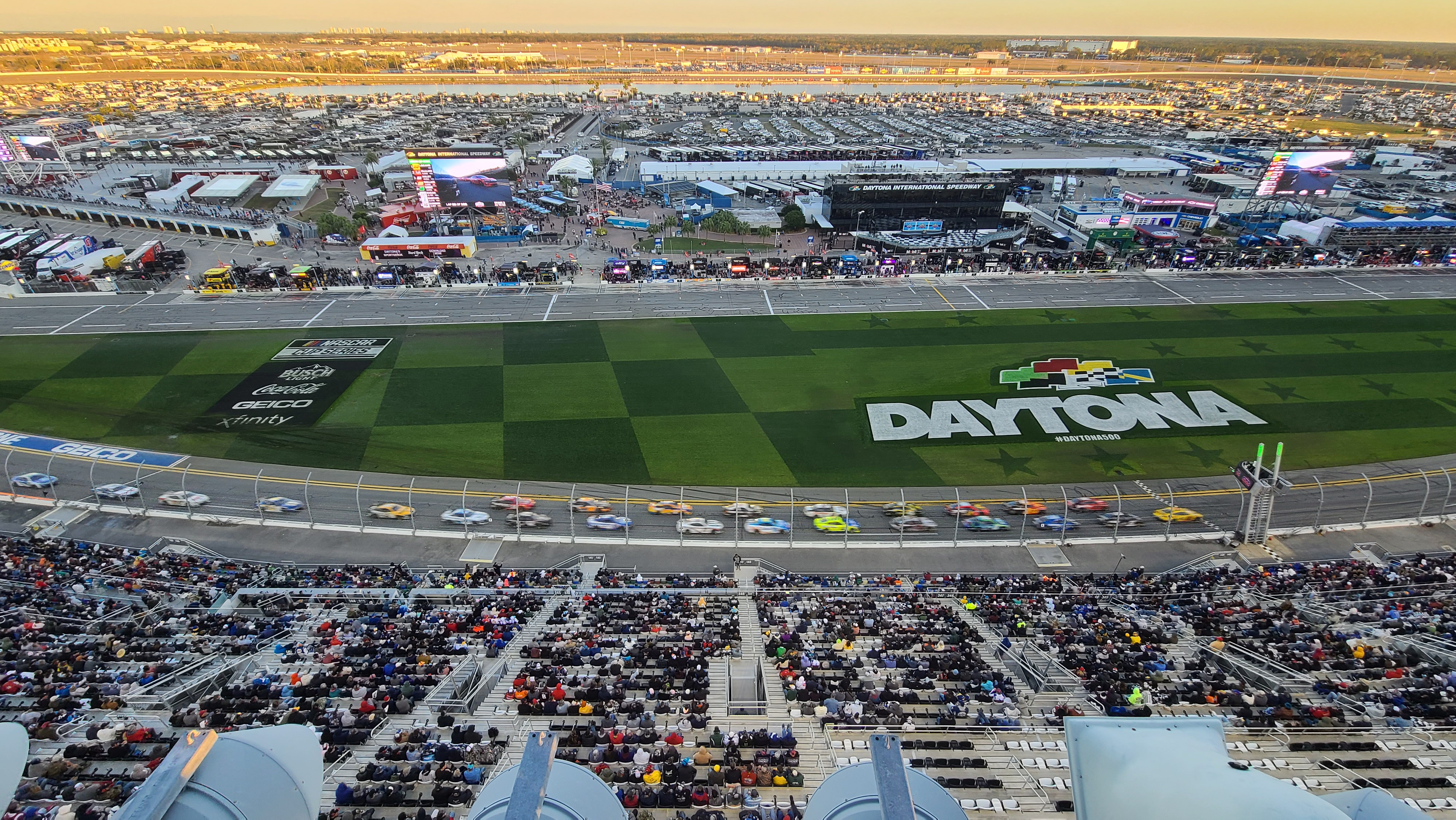
View of cars racing on the front stretch at the 2024 Daytona 500

Daytona International Speedway is one of three superspeedways to hold NASCAR races, the other two being Atlanta Motor Speedway and Talladega Superspeedway. The standard track at Daytona International Speedway is a four-turn superspeedway that is 2.5 miles (4.0 km) long. The track's turns are banked at 31 degrees, while the front stretch, the location of the finish line, is banked at 18 degrees.

Daytona announced on October 22, 2025, that the 2027 Daytona 500 would be held on February 21, 2027, to avoid a conflict with the Super Bowl rather than its traditional Presidents' Day weekend. The Clash would be held the day before the Super Bowl and the Duels would be held on Thursday, February 18th.

== Media ==
=== Television ===
FS1
Booth announcers	Pit reporters
Lap-by-lap: Mike Joy; Color-commentator: Clint Bowyer; Color-commentator: Kevin Harvick	TBA

=== Radio ===
MRN Radio
Booth announcers	Turn announcers	Pit reporters
Lead announcer: Alex Hayden; Announcer: TBA; Announcer: Rusty Wallace	Turns 1 & 2: Dave Moody; Backstretch: Mike Bagley; Turns 3 & 4: Kyle Rickey	Steve Post; Kim Coon; Brienne Pedigo

Previous race: 2027 Wheatley Vodka Clash (exhibition)	NASCAR Cup Series; 2027 season	Next race: 2027 Daytona 500 (points)
