= 2026 Xfinity 500 =

NASCAR Cup Series race

Race details
- Race 35 of 36 in the 2026 NASCAR Cup Series
- Date: November 1, 2026
- Location: Martinsville Speedway in Ridgeway, Virginia
- Course: Permanent racing facility
- Course length: 0.526 miles (0.847 km)
- Distance: 500 laps, 263 mi (423.5 km)
- Average speed: 79.257 miles per hour (127.552 km/h)

Pole position
Driver	Denny Hamlin	Joe Gibbs Racing
- Time: 19.226

Most laps led
Driver	William Byron	Hendrick Motorsports
- Laps: 362

Fastest lap
Driver	William Byron	Hendrick Motorsports
- Time: 19.817

Winner
No. 24	William Byron	Hendrick Motorsports

Television in the United States
- Network: NBC
- Announcers: Leigh Diffey, Jeff Burton and Steve Letarte

Radio in the United States
- Radio: MRN
- Booth announcers: Alex Hayden, Mike Bagley, and Todd Gordon
- Turn announcers: Dave Moody (Backstretch)

The 2026 Xfinity 500 was a NASCAR Cup Series race held on November 1, 2026, at Martinsville Speedway in Ridgeway, Virginia. Contested over 500 laps on the 0.526 mile (0.847 km) paperclip-shaped short track, it was the 35th race of the 2026 NASCAR Cup Series season, the ninth race of the NASCAR Chase.

William Byron won the race. Chase Elliott finished 2nd, and Ty Gibbs finished 3rd. Josh Berry and Shane van Gisbergen rounded out the top five, and Denny Hamlin, Austin Dillon, Bubba Wallace, Kyle Larson, and Christopher Bell rounded out the top ten.

== Report ==
=== Background ===
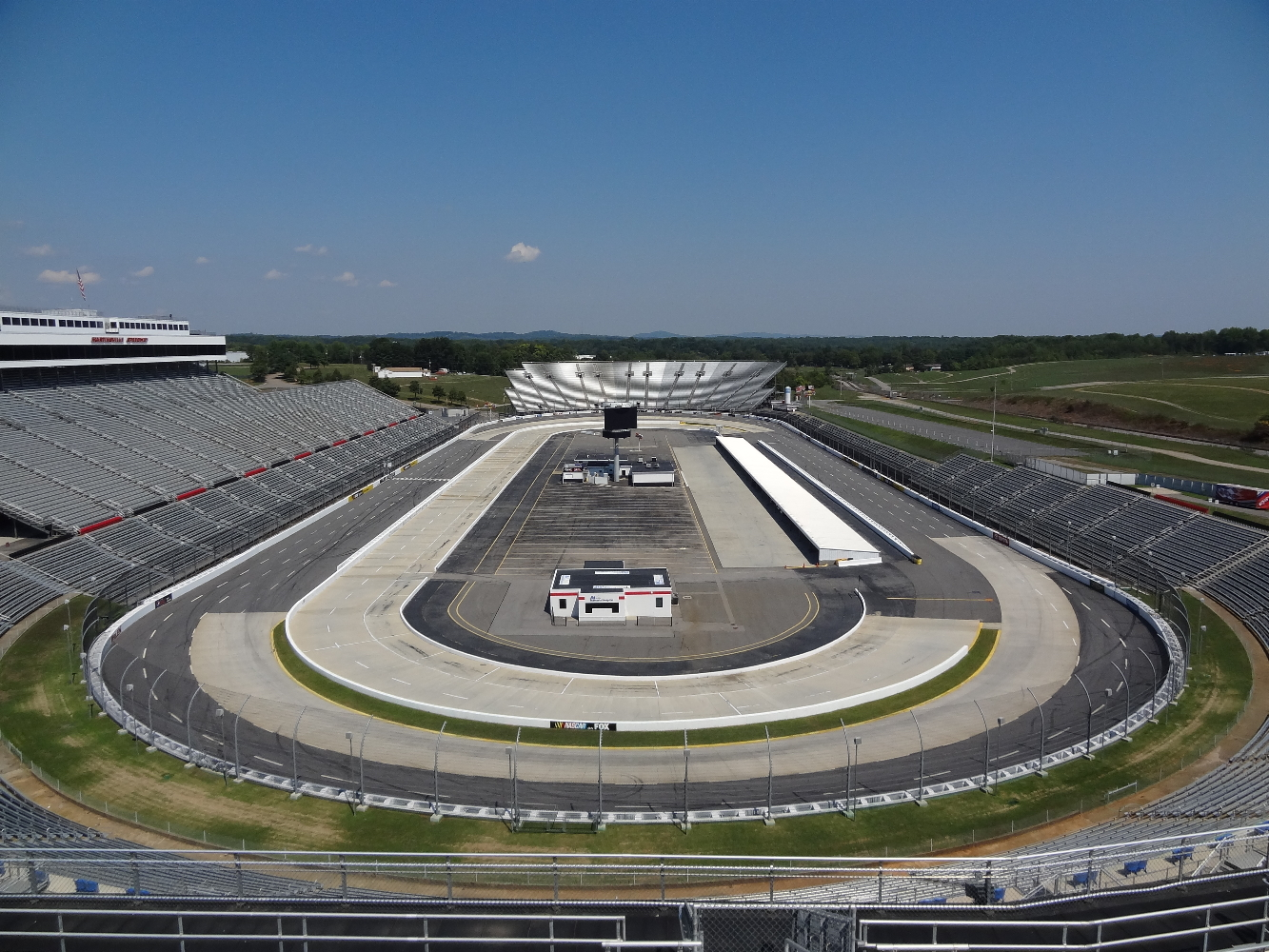
Martinsville Speedway, the track where the race was held.

Martinsville Speedway is a NASCAR-owned stock car racing track located in Henry County, in Ridgeway, Virginia, just to the south of Martinsville. At 0.526 miles (0.847 km) in length, it is currently the shortest track in the NASCAR Cup Series. The track was also one of the first paved oval tracks in NASCAR, being built in 1947 by H. Clay Earles. It is also the only remaining race track on the NASCAR circuit since its beginning in 1948.

==== Entry list ====
- (R) denotes rookie driver.
- (i) denotes driver who is ineligible for series driver points.
- (CC) denotes chase contender.

No.	Driver	Team	Manufacturer
1	Ross Chastain	Trackhouse Racing	Chevrolet
2	Austin Cindric (CC)	Team Penske	Ford
3	Austin Dillon	Richard Childress Racing	Chevrolet
4	Noah Gragson	Front Row Motorsports	Ford
5	Kyle Larson (CC)	Hendrick Motorsports	Chevrolet
6	Brad Keselowski	RFK Racing	Ford
7	Daniel Suárez (CC)	Spire Motorsports	Chevrolet
9	Chase Elliott (CC)	Hendrick Motorsports	Chevrolet
10	Ty Dillon	Kaulig Racing	Chevrolet
11	Denny Hamlin (CC)	Joe Gibbs Racing	Toyota
12	Ryan Blaney (CC)	Team Penske	Ford
16	A. J. Allmendinger	Kaulig Racing	Chevrolet
17	Chris Buescher (CC)	RFK Racing	Ford
19	Chase Briscoe (CC)	Joe Gibbs Racing	Toyota
20	Christopher Bell (CC)	Joe Gibbs Racing	Toyota
21	Josh Berry	Wood Brothers Racing	Ford
22	Joey Logano (CC)	Team Penske	Ford
23	Bubba Wallace (CC)	23XI Racing	Toyota
24	William Byron (CC)	Hendrick Motorsports	Chevrolet
33	Austin Hill (i)	Richard Childress Racing	Chevrolet
34	Todd Gilliland	Front Row Motorsports	Ford
35	Riley Herbst	23XI Racing	Toyota
38	Zane Smith	Front Row Motorsports	Ford
41	Cole Custer	Haas Factory Team	Chevrolet
42	John Hunter Nemechek	Legacy Motor Club	Toyota
43	Erik Jones	Legacy Motor Club	Toyota
45	Tyler Reddick (CC)	23XI Racing	Toyota
47	Ricky Stenhouse Jr.	Hyak Motorsports	Chevrolet
48	Alex Bowman	Hendrick Motorsports	Chevrolet
51	Cody Ware	Rick Ware Racing	Chevrolet
54	Ty Gibbs (CC)	Joe Gibbs Racing	Toyota
60	Ryan Preece (CC)	RFK Racing	Ford
66	Josh Bilicki (i)	Garage 66	Ford
71	Michael McDowell	Spire Motorsports	Chevrolet
77	Carson Hocevar (CC)	Spire Motorsports	Chevrolet
88	Connor Zilisch (R)	Trackhouse Racing	Chevrolet
97	Shane van Gisbergen	Trackhouse Racing	Chevrolet
Official entry list

== Practice ==
Ryan Preece was the fastest in the practice session with a time of 19.600 seconds and a speed of 96.612 mph (155.482 km/h).

=== Practice results ===
Pos	No.	Driver	Team	Manufacturer	Time	Speed
1	60	Ryan Preece (CC)	RFK Racing	Ford	19.600	96.612
2	21	Josh Berry	Wood Brothers Racing	Ford	19.679	96.224
3	34	Todd Gilliland	Front Row Motorsports	Ford	19.740	95.927
Official practice results

== Qualifying ==
Denny Hamlin scored the pole for the race with a time of 19.226 and a speed of 98.492 mph (158.508 km/h).

=== Qualifying results ===
Pos	No.	Driver	Team	Manufacturer	Time	Speed
1	11	Denny Hamlin (CC)	Joe Gibbs Racing	Toyota	19.226	98.492
2	54	Ty Gibbs (CC)	Joe Gibbs Racing	Toyota	19.275	98.241
3	5	Kyle Larson (CC)	Hendrick Motorsports	Chevrolet	19.300	98.114
4	2	Austin Cindric (CC)	Team Penske	Ford	19.325	97.987
5	22	Joey Logano (CC)	Team Penske	Ford	19.330	97.362
6	60	Ryan Preece (CC)	RFK Racing	Ford	19.343	97.896
7	48	Alex Bowman	Hendrick Motorsports	Chevrolet	19.354	97.840
8	24	William Byron (CC)	Hendrick Motorsports	Chevrolet	19.368	97.770
9	9	Chase Elliott (CC)	Hendrick Motorsports	Chevrolet	19.379	97.714
10	21	Josh Berry	Wood Brothers Racing	Ford	19.380	97.709
11	19	Chase Briscoe (CC)	Joe Gibbs Racing	Toyota	19.382	97.699
12	45	Tyler Reddick (CC)	23XI Racing	Toyota	19.394	97.638
13	12	Ryan Blaney (CC)	Team Penske	Ford	19.414	97.538
14	20	Christopher Bell (CC)	Joe Gibbs Racing	Toyota	19.416	97.528
15	23	Bubba Wallace (CC)	23XI Racing	Toyota	19.433	97.442
16	1	Ross Chastain	Trackhouse Racing	Chevrolet	19.443	97.392
17	33	Austin Hill (i)	Richard Childress Racing	Chevrolet	19.449	97.362
18	17	Chris Buescher (CC)	RFK Racing	Ford	19.457	97.322
19	88	Connor Zilisch (R)	Trackhouse Racing	Chevrolet	19.490	97.158
20	3	Austin Dillon	Richard Childress Racing	Chevrolet	19.495	97.133
21	41	Cole Custer	Haas Factory Team	Chevrolet	19.506	97.078
22	34	Todd Gilliland	Front Row Motorsports	Ford	19.508	97.068
23	6	Brad Keselowski	RFK Racing	Ford	19.523	96.993
24	7	Daniel Suárez (CC)	Spire Motorsports	Chevrolet	19.537	96.924
25	77	Carson Hocevar (CC)	Spire Motorsports	Chevrolet	19.540	96.909
26	71	Michael McDowell	Spire Motorsports	Chevrolet	19.552	96.849
27	35	Riley Herbst	23XI Racing	Toyota	19.555	96.835
28	10	Ty Dillon	Kaulig Racing	Chevrolet	19.559	96.815
29	97	Shane van Gisbergen	Trackhouse Racing	Chevrolet	19.584	96.691
30	43	Erik Jones	Legacy Motor Club	Toyota	19.588	96.671
31	4	Noah Gragson	Front Row Motorsports	Ford	19.620	96.514
32	16	A. J. Allmendinger	Kaulig Racing	Chevrolet	19.624	96.494
33	38	Zane Smith	Front Row Motorsports	Ford	19.643	96.401
34	47	Ricky Stenhouse Jr.	Hyak Motorsports	Chevrolet	19.703	96.107
35	42	John Hunter Nemechek	Legacy Motor Club	Toyota	19.726	95.995
36	66	Josh Bilicki (i)	Garage 66	Ford	20.004	94.661
37	51	Cody Ware	Rick Ware Racing	Chevrolet	0.000	0.000
Official qualifying results

== Race ==
=== Race results ===
==== Stage results ====
Stage One Laps: 130

Pos	No	Driver	Team	Manufacturer	Points
1	24	William Byron (CC)	Hendrick Motorsports	Chevrolet	10
2	54	Ty Gibbs (CC)	Joe Gibbs Racing	Toyota	9
3	60	Ryan Preece (CC)	RFK Racing	Ford	8
4	20	Christopher Bell (CC)	Joe Gibbs Racing	Toyota	7
5	21	Josh Berry	Wood Brothers Racing	Ford	6
6	48	Alex Bowman	Hendrick Motorsports	Chevrolet	5
7	2	Austin Cindric (CC)	Team Penske	Ford	4
8	1	Ross Chastain	Trackhouse Racing	Chevrolet	3
9	45	Tyler Reddick (CC)	23XI Racing	Toyota	2
10	9	Chase Elliott (CC)	Hendrick Motorsports	Chevrolet	1

Stage Two Laps: 130

Pos	No	Driver	Team	Manufacturer	Points
1	24	William Byron (CC)	Hendrick Motorsports	Chevrolet	10
2	9	Chase Elliott (CC)	Hendrick Motorsports	Chevrolet	9
3	54	Ty Gibbs (CC)	Joe Gibbs Racing	Toyota	8
4	1	Ross Chastain	Trackhouse Racing	Chevrolet	7
5	22	Joey Logano (CC)	Team Penske	Ford	6
6	23	Bubba Wallace (CC)	23XI Racing	Toyota	5
7	21	Josh Berry	Wood Brothers Racing	Ford	4
8	34	Todd Gilliland	Front Row Motorsports	Ford	3
9	45	Tyler Reddick (CC)	23XI Racing	Toyota	2
10	20	Christopher Bell (CC)	Joe Gibbs Racing	Toyota	1

=== Final Stage results ===
Stage Three Laps: 240

Pos	Grid	No	Driver	Team	Manufacturer	Laps	Points
1	8	24	William Byron (CC)	Hendrick Motorsports	Chevrolet	500	76
2	9	9	Chase Elliott (CC)	Hendrick Motorsports	Chevrolet	500	45
3	2	54	Ty Gibbs (CC)	Joe Gibbs Racing	Toyota	500	51
4	10	21	Josh Berry	Wood Brothers Racing	Ford	500	43
5	29	97	Shane van Gisbergen	Trackhouse Racing	Chevrolet	500	32
6	1	11	Denny Hamlin (CC)	Joe Gibbs Racing	Toyota	500	31
7	20	3	Austin Dillon	Richard Childress Racing	Chevrolet	500	30
8	15	23	Bubba Wallace (CC)	23XI Racing	Toyota	499	34
9	3	5	Kyle Larson (CC)	Hendrick Motorsports	Chevrolet	499	28
10	14	20	Christopher Bell (CC)	Joe Gibbs Racing	Toyota	499	35
11	16	1	Ross Chastain	Trackhouse Racing	Chevrolet	499	36
12	12	45	Tyler Reddick (CC)	23XI Racing	Toyota	499	29
13	7	48	Alex Bowman	Hendrick Motorsports	Chevrolet	499	29
14	11	19	Chase Briscoe (CC)	Joe Gibbs Racing	Toyota	499	23
15	22	34	Todd Gilliland	Front Row Motorsports	Ford	499	25
16	26	71	Michael McDowell	Spire Motorsports	Chevrolet	499	21
17	18	88	Connor Zilisch (R)	Trackhouse Racing	Chevrolet	499	20
18	5	22	Joey Logano (CC)	Team Penske	Ford	498	25
19	33	38	Zane Smith	Front Row Motorsports	Ford	498	18
20	17	33	Austin Hill (i)	Richard Childress Racing	Chevrolet	498	0
21	25	77	Carson Hocevar (CC)	Spire Motorsports	Chevrolet	498	16
22	28	10	Ty Dillon	Kaulig Racing	Chevrolet	498	15
23	6	60	Ryan Preece (CC)	RFK Racing	Ford	498	22
24	18	17	Chris Buescher (CC)	RFK Racing	Ford	497	13
25	32	16	A. J. Allmendinger	Kaulig Racing	Chevrolet	497	12
26	31	4	Noah Gragson	Front Row Motorsports	Ford	497	11
27	23	6	Brad Keselowski	RFK Racing	Ford	497	10
28	24	7	Daniel Suárez (CC)	Spire Motorsports	Chevrolet	497	9
29	30	43	Erik Jones	Legacy Motor Club	Toyota	497	8
30	34	47	Ricky Stenhouse Jr	Hyak Motorsports	Chevrolet	497	7
31	35	42	John Hunter Nemechek	Legacy Motor Club	Toyota	496	6
32	27	35	Riley Herbst	23XI Racing	Toyota	495	5
33	37	51	Cody Ware	Rick Ware Racing	Chevrolet	494	4
34	21	41	Cole Custer	Haas Factory Team	Chevrolet	487	3
35	13	12	Ryan Blaney (CC)	Team Penske	Ford	441	2
36	4	2	Austin Cindric (CC)	Team Penske	Ford	222	5
37	36	66	Josh Bilicki (i)	Garage 66	Ford	105	0
Official race results

=== Race statistics ===
- Lead changes: 11 among 6 different drivers
- Cautions/Laps: 6 for 47
- Red flags: 0
- Time of race: 3 hours, 19 minutes, and 6 seconds
- Average speed: 79.257 miles per hour (127.552 km/h)

== Media ==
=== Television ===
NBC covered the race on the television side. Leigh Diffey, 1997 race winner Jeff Burton, and Steve Letarte called the race from the broadcast booth. Dave Burns, Kim Coon, Marty Snider, and Trevor Bayne handled pit road for the television side.

NBC
Booth announcers	Pit reporters
Lap-by-lap: Leigh Diffey; Color-commentator: Jeff Burton; Color-commentator: Steve Letarte	Dave Burns; Kim Coon; Marty Snider; Trevor Bayne

=== Radio ===
MRN had the radio call for the race, which was also simulcast on Sirius XM NASCAR Radio. Alex Hayden, Mike Bagley and former championship winning crew chief Todd Gordon had the call for MRN when the field raced down the front straightaway. Dave Moody covered the action for MRN when the field raced down the backstraightway into turn 3. MRN Lead Pit Reporter Steve Post, Wendy Venturini, and Chris Wilner covered the action for MRN from pit lane.

MRN
Booth announcers	Turn announcers	Pit reporters
Lead announcer: Alex Hayden; Announcer: Mike Bagley; Announcer: Todd Gordon	Backstretch: Dave Moody	Steve Post; Wendy Venturini; Chris Wilner

== Standings after the race ==
Drivers' Championship standings

	Pos	Driver	Points
	1	Kyle Larson	2,469
1	2	Christopher Bell	2,402 (–67)
1	3	Denny Hamlin	2,399 (–70)
	4	Chase Briscoe	2,385 (–84)
	5	Joey Logano	2,366 (–103)
1	6	Tyler Reddick	2,344 (–125)
1	7	Ryan Blaney	2,336 (–133)
1	8	Ty Gibbs	2,309 (–160)
2	9	William Byron	2,303 (–166)
2	10	Chase Elliott	2,268 (–201)
3	11	Austin Cindric	2,263 (–206)
2	12	Carson Hocevar	2,259 (–210)
	13	Bubba Wallace	2,257 (–212)
1	14	Ryan Preece	2,214 (–255)
1	15	Daniel Suárez	2,210 (–259)
	16	Chris Buescher	2,199 (–270)
Official driver's standings

Manufacturers' Championship standings

Pos	Manufacturer	Points
1	Toyota	1,552
2	Chevrolet	1,382 (–170)
3	Ford	1,287 (–265)

- Note: Only the first 16 positions are included for the driver standings.

Previous race: 2026 YellaWood 500	NASCAR Cup Series; 2026 season	Next race: 2026 Season Finale 400
