= 2026 Season Finale 400 =

NASCAR Cup Series race

Race details
- Race 36 of 36 in the 2026 NASCAR Cup Series
- Date: November 8, 2026
- Location: Homestead–Miami Speedway in Homestead, Florida
- Course: Permanent racing facility
- Course length: 1.5 miles (2.4 km)
- Distance: 267 laps, 400.5 mi (640.8 km)
- Average speed: 133.5 miles per hour (214.8 km/h)

Pole position
Driver	Chase Briscoe	Joe Gibbs Racing
- Time: 32.396

Most laps led
Driver	Denny Hamlin	Joe Gibbs Racing
- Laps: 87

Fastest lap
Driver	Ryan Blaney	Team Penske
- Time: 32.616

Winner
No. 12	Ryan Blaney	Team Penske

Television in the United States
- Network: NBC
- Announcers: Leigh Diffey, Jeff Burton and Steve Letarte

Radio in the United States
- Radio: MRN
- Booth announcers: Alex Hayden, Mike Bagley, and Todd Gordon
- Turn announcers: Dave Moody (1 & 2) and Tim Catafalmo (3 & 4)

The 2026 Season Finale 400 was a NASCAR Cup Series race held on November 8, 2026, at Homestead–Miami Speedway in Homestead, Florida. Contested over 267 laps on the 1.5 mile (2.4 km) oval, it was the 36th and final race of the 2026 NASCAR Cup Series season and the tenth and final race of the NASCAR Chase.

Ryan Blaney won the race. Tyler Reddick finished 2nd, and William Byron finished 3rd. Christopher Bell and Bubba Wallace rounded out the top five, and Denny Hamlin, Austin Cindric, Daniel Suárez, Noah Gragson, and Michael McDowell rounded out the top ten. In addition, Kyle Larson, finishing 12th, clinched his second consecutive and third overall Cup Series championship with a fourth-place finish in the first stage, becoming the first driver since Jimmie Johnson in 2006 through 2010 to win consecutive championships.

== Report ==
=== Background ===
Homestead–Miami Speedway is a motor racing track located in Homestead, Florida. The track, which has several configurations, has promoted several series of racing, including NASCAR, the IndyCar Series and the Grand-Am Rolex Sports Car Series

From 2002 to 2019, as well as 2026, Homestead-Miami Speedway has hosted the final race of the season in all three of NASCAR's series: the NASCAR Cup Series, O'Reilly Auto Parts Series and Craftsman Truck Series.

Storylines

Coming into the final race of the season, three drivers are mathematically eligible to win the championship. Kyle Larson holds a commanding 67-point lead over second-place Christopher Bell, who is three points ahead of third-place Denny Hamlin. In order to clinch the championship, Larson would need to only finish 28th or better; however, he can also automatically clinch the championship if he collects eight stage points during the race.

Carson Hocevar was suspended by Spire Motorsports due to his actions from the prior race at Martinsville. He will be replaced by Justin Haley.

Casey Mears will make 500th start in the NASCAR Cup Series, while J. J. Yeley will make his 400th Cup Series start.

==== Entry list ====
- (R) denotes rookie driver.
- (i) denotes driver who is ineligible for series driver points.
- (CC) denotes chase contender.

No.	Driver	Team	Manufacturer
1	Ross Chastain	Trackhouse Racing	Chevrolet
2	Austin Cindric (CC)	Team Penske	Ford
3	Austin Dillon	Richard Childress Racing	Chevrolet
4	Noah Gragson	Front Row Motorsports	Ford
5	Kyle Larson (CC)	Hendrick Motorsports	Chevrolet
6	Brad Keselowski	RFK Racing	Ford
7	Daniel Suárez (CC)	Spire Motorsports	Chevrolet
9	Chase Elliott (CC)	Hendrick Motorsports	Chevrolet
10	Ty Dillon	Kaulig Racing	Chevrolet
11	Denny Hamlin (CC)	Joe Gibbs Racing	Toyota
12	Ryan Blaney (CC)	Team Penske	Ford
16	A. J. Allmendinger	Kaulig Racing	Chevrolet
17	Chris Buescher (CC)	RFK Racing	Ford
19	Chase Briscoe (CC)	Joe Gibbs Racing	Toyota
20	Christopher Bell (CC)	Joe Gibbs Racing	Toyota
21	Josh Berry	Wood Brothers Racing	Ford
22	Joey Logano (CC)	Team Penske	Ford
23	Bubba Wallace (CC)	23XI Racing	Toyota
24	William Byron (CC)	Hendrick Motorsports	Chevrolet
33	Austin Hill (i)	Richard Childress Racing	Chevrolet
34	Todd Gilliland	Front Row Motorsports	Ford
35	Riley Herbst	23XI Racing	Toyota
38	Zane Smith	Front Row Motorsports	Ford
41	Cole Custer	Haas Factory Team	Chevrolet
42	John Hunter Nemechek	Legacy Motor Club	Toyota
43	Erik Jones	Legacy Motor Club	Toyota
44	J. J. Yeley (i)	NY Racing Team	Chevrolet
45	Tyler Reddick (CC)	23XI Racing	Toyota
47	Ricky Stenhouse Jr.	Hyak Motorsports	Chevrolet
48	Alex Bowman	Hendrick Motorsports	Chevrolet
51	Cody Ware	Rick Ware Racing	Chevrolet
54	Ty Gibbs (CC)	Joe Gibbs Racing	Toyota
60	Ryan Preece (CC)	RFK Racing	Ford
62	Casey Mears	Beard Motorsports	Chevrolet
66	Chad Finchum (i)	Garage 66	Ford
67	Corey Heim (i)	23XI Racing	Toyota
71	Michael McDowell	Spire Motorsports	Chevrolet
77	Justin Haley (i)	Spire Motorsports	Chevrolet
88	Connor Zilisch (R)	Trackhouse Racing	Chevrolet
97	Shane van Gisbergen	Trackhouse Racing	Chevrolet
Official entry list

== Practice ==
Chase Briscoe was the fastest in the practice session with a time of 32.680 seconds and a speed of 165.239 mph (265.926 km/h).

=== Practice results ===
Pos	No.	Driver	Team	Manufacturer	Time	Speed
1	19	Chase Briscoe (CC)	Joe Gibbs Racing	Toyota	32.680	165.239
2	2	Austin Cindric (CC)	Team Penske	Ford	32.753	164.870
3	11	Denny Hamlin (CC)	Joe Gibbs Racing	Toyota	32.790	164.684
Official practice results

== Qualifying ==
Chase Briscoe scored the pole for the race with a time of 32.396 and a speed of 166.687 mph (268.257 km/h).

=== Qualifying results ===
Pos	No.	Driver	Team	Manufacturer	Time	Speed
1	19	Chase Briscoe (CC)	Joe Gibbs Racing	Toyota	32.396	166.687
2	11	Denny Hamlin (CC)	Joe Gibbs Racing	Toyota	32.413	166.600
3	45	Tyler Reddick (CC)	23XI Racing	Toyota	32.437	166.477
4	5	Kyle Larson (CC)	Hendrick Motorsports	Chevrolet	32.463	166.343
5	2	Austin Cindric (CC)	Team Penske	Ford	32.526	166.021
6	20	Christopher Bell (CC)	Joe Gibbs Racing	Toyota	32.556	165.868
7	9	Chase Elliott (CC)	Hendrick Motorsports	Chevrolet	32.603	165.629
8	24	William Byron (CC)	Hendrick Motorsports	Chevrolet	32.610	165.593
9	12	Ryan Blaney (CC)	Team Penske	Ford	32.650	165.391
10	7	Daniel Suárez (CC)	Spire Motorsports	Chevrolet	32.667	165.304
11	33	Austin Hill (i)	Richard Childress Racing	Chevrolet	32.667	165.304
12	71	Michael McDowell	Spire Motorsports	Chevrolet	32.711	165.082
13	48	Alex Bowman	Hendrick Motorsports	Chevrolet	32.724	165.017
14	21	Josh Berry	Wood Brothers Racing	Ford	32.746	164.906
15	1	Ross Chastain	Trackhouse Racing	Chevrolet	32.758	164.845
16	67	Corey Heim (i)	23XI Racing	Toyota	32.763	164.820
17	17	Chris Buescher (CC)	RFK Racing	Ford	32.770	164.785
18	23	Bubba Wallace (CC)	23XI Racing	Toyota	32.771	164.780
19	22	Joey Logano (CC)	Team Penske	Ford	32.773	164.770
20	54	Ty Gibbs (CC)	Joe Gibbs Racing	Toyota	32.786	164.704
21	3	Austin Dillon	Richard Childress Racing	Chevrolet	32.806	164.604
22	47	Ricky Stenhouse Jr.	Hyak Motorsports	Chevrolet	32.816	164.554
23	88	Connor Zilisch (R)	Trackhouse Racing	Chevrolet	32.821	164.529
24	43	Erik Jones	Legacy Motor Club	Toyota	32.840	164.434
25	34	Todd Gilliland	Front Row Motorsports	Ford	32.863	164.319
26	77	Justin Haley (i)	Spire Motorsports	Chevrolet	32.877	164.249
27	38	Zane Smith	Front Row Motorsports	Ford	32.877	164.249
28	41	Cole Custer	Haas Factory Team	Chevrolet	32.887	164.199
29	16	A. J. Allmendinger	Kaulig Racing	Chevrolet	32.904	164.114
30	35	Riley Herbst	23XI Racing	Toyota	32.979	163.741
31	10	Ty Dillon	Kaulig Racing	Chevrolet	33.086	163.221
32	60	Ryan Preece (CC)	RFK Racing	Ford	33.087	163.206
33	4	Noah Gragson	Front Row Motorsports	Ford	33.090	163.191
34	97	Shane van Gisbergen	Trackhouse Racing	Chevrolet	33.097	163.157
35	51	Cody Ware	Rick Ware Racing	Chevrolet	33.198	162.660
36	42	John Hunter Nemechek	Legacy Motor Club	Toyota	33.199	162.656
37	62	Casey Mears	Beard Motorsports	Chevrolet	33.422	161.570
38	44	J. J. Yeley (i)	NY Racing Team	Chevrolet	33.674	160.361
39	66	Chad Finchum (i)	Garage 66	Ford	34.382	157.059
40	6	Brad Keselowski	RFK Racing	Ford	35.589	151.732
Official qualifying results

== Race ==
=== Race results ===
==== Stage Results ====
Stage One Laps: 80

Pos	No	Driver	Team	Manufacturer	Points
1	45	Tyler Reddick (CC)	23XI Racing	Toyota	10
2	12	Ryan Blaney (CC)	Team Penske	Ford	9
3	20	Christopher Bell (CC)	Joe Gibbs Racing	Toyota	8
4	5	Kyle Larson (CC)	Hendrick Motorsports	Chevrolet	7
5	2	Austin Cindric (CC)	Team Penske	Ford	6
6	11	Denny Hamlin (CC)	Joe Gibbs Racing	Toyota	5
7	23	Bubba Wallace (CC)	23XI Racing	Toyota	4
8	7	Daniel Suárez (CC)	Spire Motorsports	Chevrolet	3
9	24	William Byron (CC)	Hendrick Motorsports	Chevrolet	2
10	9	Chase Elliott (CC)	Hendrick Motorsports	Chevrolet	1

Stage Two Laps: 85

Pos	No	Driver	Team	Manufacturer	Points
1	11	Denny Hamlin (CC)	Joe Gibbs Racing	Toyota	10
2	20	Christopher Bell (CC)	Joe Gibbs Racing	Toyota	9
3	45	Tyler Reddick (CC)	23XI Racing	Toyota	8
4	2	Austin Cindric (CC)	Team Penske	Ford	7
5	12	Ryan Blaney (CC)	Team Penske	Ford	6
6	24	William Byron (CC)	Hendrick Motorsports	Chevrolet	5
7	48	Alex Bowman	Hendrick Motorsports	Chevrolet	4
8	9	Chase Elliott (CC)	Hendrick Motorsports	Chevrolet	3
9	38	Zane Smith	Front Row Motorsports	Ford	2
10	7	Daniel Suárez (CC)	Spire Motorsports	Chevrolet	1

=== Final Stage Results ===
Stage Three Laps: 102

Pos	Grid	No	Driver	Team	Manufacturer	Laps	Points
1	9	12	Ryan Blaney (CC)	Team Penske	Ford	267	71
2	3	45	Tyler Reddick (CC)	23XI Racing	Toyota	267	53
3	8	24	William Byron (CC)	Hendrick Motorsports	Chevrolet	267	41
4	6	20	Christopher Bell (CC)	Joe Gibbs Racing	Toyota	267	50
5	18	23	Bubba Wallace (CC)	23XI Racing	Toyota	267	36
6	2	11	Denny Hamlin (CC)	Joe Gibbs Racing	Toyota	267	46
7	5	2	Austin Cindric (CC)	Team Penske	Ford	267	43
8	10	7	Daniel Suárez (CC)	Spire Motorsports	Chevrolet	267	33
9	33	4	Noah Gragson	Front Row Motorsports	Ford	267	28
10	12	71	Michael McDowell	Spire Motorsports	Chevrolet	267	27
11	20	54	Ty Gibbs (CC)	Joe Gibbs Racing	Toyota	267	26
12	4	5	Kyle Larson (CC)	Hendrick Motorsports	Chevrolet	267	32
13	14	21	Josh Berry	Wood Brothers Racing	Ford	267	24
14	27	38	Zane Smith	Front Row Motorsports	Ford	267	25
15	11	33	Austin Hill (i)	Richard Childress Racing	Chevrolet	267	0
16	13	48	Alex Bowman	Hendrick Motorsports	Chevrolet	267	25
17	19	22	Joey Logano (CC)	Team Penske	Ford	267	20
18	25	34	Todd Gilliland	Front Row Motorsports	Ford	267	19
19	23	88	Connor Zilisch (R)	Trackhouse Racing	Chevrolet	267	18
20	24	43	Erik Jones	Legacy Motor Club	Toyota	267	17
21	26	77	Justin Haley (i)	Spire Motorsports	Chevrolet	267	0
22	7	9	Chase Elliott (CC)	Hendrick Motorsports	Chevrolet	267	19
23	29	16	A. J. Allmendinger	Kaulig Racing	Chevrolet	267	14
24	17	17	Chris Buescher (CC)	RFK Racing	Ford	267	13
25	32	60	Ryan Preece (CC)	RFK Racing	Ford	267	12
26	21	3	Austin Dillon	Richard Childress Racing	Chevrolet	266	11
27	15	1	Ross Chastain	Trackhouse Racing	Chevrolet	266	10
28	40	6	Brad Keselowski	RFK Racing	Ford	266	9
29	28	41	Cole Custer	Haas Factory Team	Chevrolet	266	8
30	36	42	John Hunter Nemechek	Legacy Motor Club	Toyota	266	7
31	31	10	Ty Dillon	Kaulig Racing	Chevrolet	266	6
32	22	47	Ricky Stenhouse Jr.	Hyak Motorsports	Chevrolet	266	5
33	30	35	Riley Herbst	23XI Racing	Toyota	265	4
34	34	97	Shane van Gisbergen	Trackhouse Racing	Chevrolet	265	3
35	35	51	Cody Ware	Rick Ware Racing	Chevrolet	264	2
36	38	44	J. J. Yeley (i)	NY Racing Team	Chevrolet	262	0
37	37	62	Casey Mears	Beard Motorsports	Chevrolet	261	1
38	39	66	Chad Finchum (i)	Garage 66	Ford	257	0
39	1	19	Chase Briscoe (CC)	Joe Gibbs Racing	Toyota	77	1
40	16	67	Corey Heim (i)	23XI Racing	Toyota	57	0
Official race results

=== Race statistics ===
- Lead changes: 18 among 8 different drivers
- Cautions/Laps: 3 for 23
- Red flags: 0
- Time of race: 3 hours, 0 minutes and 0 seconds
- Average speed: 133.5 miles per hour (214.8 km/h)

== Media ==
=== Television ===
NBC covered the race on the television side. Leigh Diffey, Jeff Burton and Steve Letarte called the race from the broadcast booth. Dave Burns, Kim Coon, Marty Snider and Trevor Bayne handled pit road for the television side.

NBC
Booth announcers	Pit reporters
Lap-by-lap: Leigh Diffey; Color-commentator: Jeff Burton; Color-commentator: Steve Letarte	Dave Burns; Kim Coon; Marty Snider; Trevor Bayne

=== Radio ===
MRN had the radio call for the race which was also simulcasted on SiriusXM NASCAR Radio. Alex Hayden, Mike Bagley, and former championship winning crew chief Todd Gordon called the action of the race for MRN when the field will race down the front straightaway. Dave Moody covered the action for MRN in turns 1 & 2, and Tim Catafalmo called of the action from turns 3 & 4. MRN Lead Pit Reporter Steve Post, Brad Gillie, and Chris Wilner covered the action of the race for MRN on pit road.

MRN
Booth announcers	Turn announcers	Pit reporters
Lead announcer: Alex Hayden; Announcer: Mike Bagley; Announcer: Todd Gordon	Turns 1 & 2: Dave Moody; Turns 3 & 4: Tim Catafalmo	Steve Post; Brad Gillie; Chris Wilner

== Standings after the race ==
Drivers' Championship standings

	Pos	Driver	Points
	1	Kyle Larson	2,501
	2	Christopher Bell	2,452 (–49)
	3	Denny Hamlin	2,445 (–56)
3	4	Ryan Blaney	2,407 (–94)
1	5	Tyler Reddick	2,397 (–104)
2	6	Chase Briscoe	2,386 (–115)
2	7	Joey Logano	2,386 (–115)
1	8	William Byron	2,344 (–157)
1	9	Ty Gibbs	2,335 (–166)
1	10	Austin Cindric	2,306 (–195)
1	11	Bubba Wallace	2,293 (–208)
2	12	Chase Elliott	2,287 (–214)
2	13	Daniel Suárez	2,243 (–258)
1	14	Carson Hocevar	2,234 (–267)
1	15	Ryan Preece	2,226 (–275)
	16	Chris Buescher	2,212 (–289)
Official driver's standings

Manufacturers' Championship standings

Pos	Manufacturer	Points
1	Toyota	1,587
2	Chevrolet	1,416 (–171)
3	Ford	1,342 (–245)

- Note: Only the first 16 positions are included for the driver standings.

Previous race: 2026 Xfinity 500	NASCAR Cup Series; 2026 season	Next race: 2027 Wheatley Vodka Clash (exhibition); 2027 Daytona 500 (points)
