= William Byron (racing driver) =

American racing driver (born 1997)

- Byron at Las Vegas Motor Speedway in 2026
- Born: William McComas Byron Jr. November 29, 1997 (age 28); Charlotte, North Carolina, U.S.
- Height: 5 ft 9 in (1.75 m)
- Weight: 154 lb (70 kg)
- Achievements: 2024, 2025 Daytona 500 Winner; 2017 NASCAR Xfinity Series Champion; 2015 NASCAR K&N Pro Series East Champion; 2025 NASCAR Cup Series Regular Season Champion; 12th driver in history to win a NASCAR race in all 3 national series at the same track (Iowa); Most wins by a rookie in the NASCAR Camping World Truck Series (7 in 2016); 2022 Slinger Nationals Winner; 2022, 2023 Clyde Hart Memorial Winner; 2022 Money in the Bank 150 Winner; 2022 North-South Super Late Model Challenge Winner; 2022 Orange Blossom 100 Winner; 2019 Daytona 500 Pole Winner; 2020 Bluegreen Vacations Duel Winner
- Awards: 2018 Monster Energy NASCAR Cup Series Rookie of the Year; 2017 NASCAR Xfinity Series Rookie of the Year; 2016 NASCAR Camping World Truck Series Rookie of the Year; 2015 NASCAR K&N Pro Series East Rookie of the Year

NASCAR Cup Series career
- 324 races run over 9 years
- Car no., team: No. 24 (Hendrick Motorsports)
- 2026 position: 8th
- Best finish: 3rd (2023, 2024)
- First race: 2018 Daytona 500 (Daytona)
- Last race: 2026 Season Finale 400 (Homestead)
- First win: 2020 Coke Zero Sugar 400 (Daytona)
- Last win: 2026 Xfinity 500 (Martinsville)
Wins	Top tens	Poles
17	138	16

NASCAR O'Reilly Auto Parts Series career
- 46 races run over 6 years
- 2026 position: 76th
- Best finish: 1st (2017)
- First race: 2017 PowerShares QQQ 300 (Daytona)
- Last race: 2026 MillerTech Battery 250 (Pocono)
- First win: 2017 American Ethanol E15 250 (Iowa)
- Last win: 2025 BetMGM 300 (Charlotte)
Wins	Top tens	Poles
5	29	3

NASCAR FedEx Freight Truck Series career
- 31 races run over 6 years
- 2025 position: 79th
- Best finish: 5th (2016)
- First race: 2015 Lucas Oil 150 (Phoenix)
- Last race: 2025 Heart of Health Care 200 (Kansas)
- First win: 2016 Toyota Tundra 250 (Kansas)
- Last win: 2022 Blue-Emu Maximum Pain Relief 200 (Martinsville)
Wins	Top tens	Poles
8	20	3

ARCA Menards Series career
- 4 races run over 2 years
- Best finish: 58th (2016)
- First race: 2015 Sioux Chief PowerPEX 200 (IRP)
- Last race: 2016 General Tire #AnywhereIsPossible 200 (Pocono)
Wins	Top tens	Poles
0	3	1

ARCA Menards Series East career
- 14 races run over 1 year
- Best finish: 1st (2015)
- First race: 2015 Hart to Heart Breast Cancer Foundation 150 (New Smyrna)
- Last race: 2015 Drive Sober 125 (Dover)
- First win: 2015 Kevin Whitaker Chevrolet 150 (Greenville-Pickens)
- Last win: 2015 United Site Services 70 (New Hampshire)
Wins	Top tens	Poles
4	11	3

ARCA Menards Series West career
- 3 races run over 2 years
- Best finish: 32nd (2018)
- First race: 2015 Carneros 200 (Sonoma)
- Last race: 2018 Carneros 200 (Sonoma)
Wins	Top tens	Poles
0	3	0
- Statistics up to date as of November 8, 2026.

William McComas Byron Jr. (born November 29, 1997) is an American professional stock car racing driver. He competes full-time in the NASCAR Cup Series, driving the No. 24 Chevrolet ZL1 for Hendrick Motorsports.

Byron won the 2015 NASCAR K&N Pro Series East Championship and the Rookie of the Year award in the 2016 NASCAR Camping World Truck Series season. The following season, he won both the 2017 NASCAR Xfinity Series Championship and the 2017 Sunoco Rookie of the Year. He also won the 2018 NASCAR Cup Series Rookie of the Year award. He is the 2024 and 2025 Daytona 500 winner, and the 2025 NASCAR Cup Series Regular Season Champion.

== Racing career ==
=== Beginnings ===
Byron became interested in racing when he was six years old after seeing a stock car race on television, and later attended a race at Martinsville Speedway in 2006. He began racing on the iRacing simulator as a teenager with over one hundred wins and 298 top-fives in online competition.

In 2012, he and his father explored how Byron could start racing offline, in real cars. He started racing Legends that year at the age of fifteen, relatively late for modern drivers. That year he won 33 races and became the Legend Car Young Lions Division champion.

For 2014, Byron signed with JR Motorsports late model program, in addition to continuing Legends competition. Byron competed in the No. 9 Liberty University Chevrolet at Hickory Motor Speedway in North Carolina for JRM. Byron scored a single victory and eleven top-five finishes, finishing second in points to teammate Josh Berry at Hickory.

=== K&N Pro Series ===
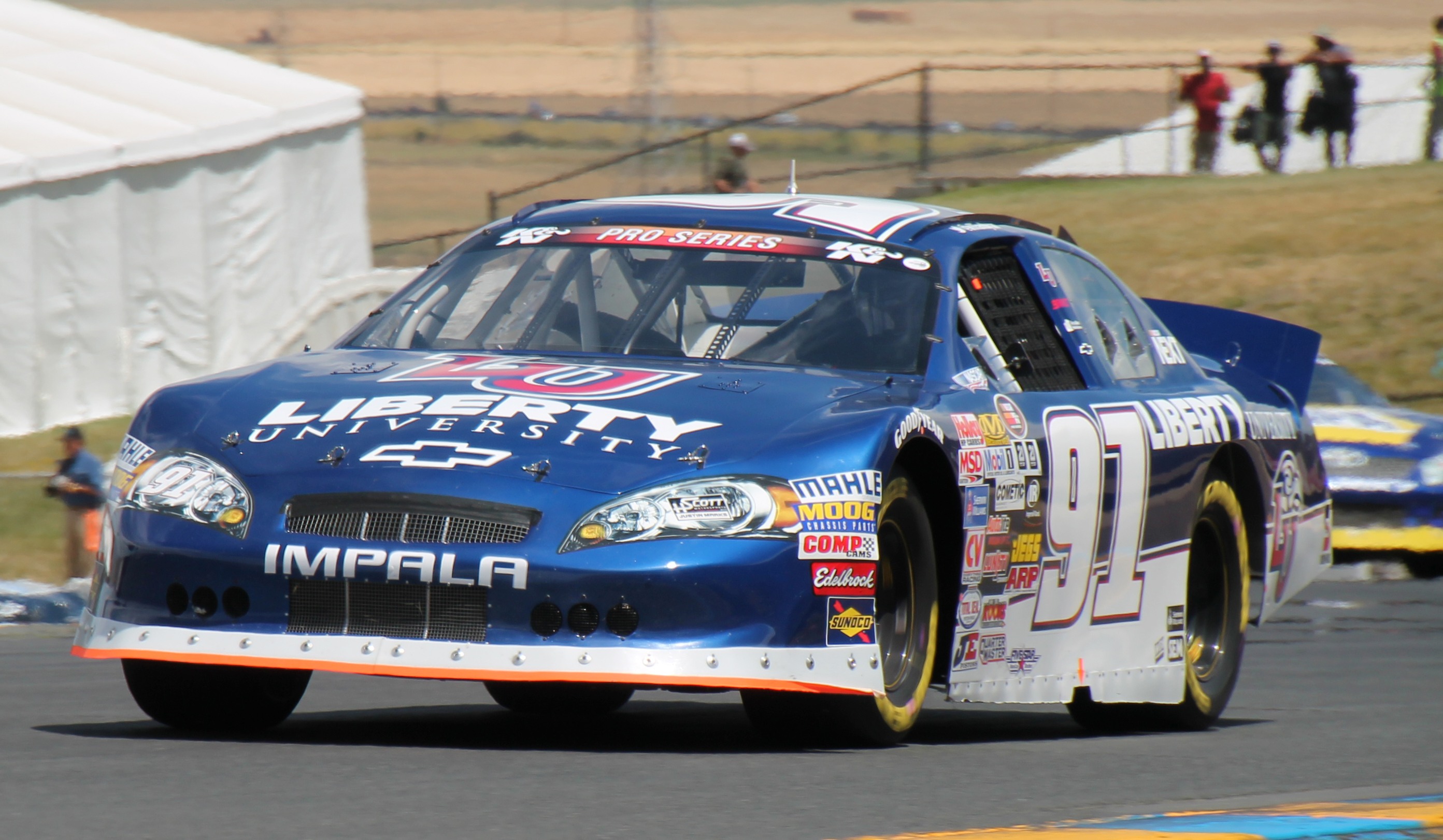
Byron at the K&N Pro Series West race at Sonoma in 2015

Byron was signed to drive in the NASCAR K&N Pro Series East for 2015 by HScott Motorsports with Justin Marks, with sponsorship from Liberty University. Byron also continued racing late models for JR Motorsports. In his debut K&N East in February at New Smyrna Speedway, Byron finished seventh. Byron won the second race of the season at Greenville-Pickens Speedway after starting second and leading all 152 laps (two laps past the scheduled distance). Byron made his ARCA Racing Series debut at Lucas Oil Raceway in July, driving the No. 55 Liberty University Toyota Camry for Venturini Motorsports. Byron finished second after leading 120 laps. He scored four K&N East wins en route to winning the series championship. Byron and his team also competed in the 2015 K&N Pro Series West races at Sonoma and Phoenix, finishing fifth and second respectively.

=== Craftsman Truck Series ===
On October 29, 2015, Kyle Busch Motorsports announced that Byron would run a full-time schedule in the team's No. 9 Toyota Tundra in the NASCAR Camping World Truck Series during the 2016 season. To prepare him for the run, KBM fielded the No. 9 for him in the 2015 Lucas Oil 150 at Phoenix International Raceway. Byron started the 2016 season on a low note crashing on the final lap at Daytona to finish thirteenth, and finishing 32nd at Atlanta after blowing an engine. Later, Byron would get his first top-three and top-ten in the Truck Series after finishing a strong third at Martinsville. Byron won his first Truck Series race at Kansas in May, after avoiding Ben Rhodes and Johnny Sauter's crash on the last lap of the race, and took his second race win in Texas in June. He won the next race at Iowa, finished seventeenth at Gateway due to a crash, and won yet again at Kentucky, propelling him to first in points. He followed that up with his fifth win of the season at Pocono Raceway, breaking the Camping World Truck Series record for most wins by a rookie. The previous mark was held by Kurt Busch during the 2000 season with four wins.

During the playoffs, Byron won the first race of the Round of 8 at New Hampshire but suffered an engine failure at the last race of the Round of 6 at Phoenix, which cost him the chance to join the Championship 4. With a win at the final race at Homestead, he placed fifth in the overall standings, with a total of seven wins, eleven top-fives, and sixteen top tens in 23 races. In addition to clinching the owners' championship for the No. 9 team, Byron was named Rookie of the Year.

Byron returned to the Truck Series in June 2021, driving the No. 27 for Rackley W.A.R. at Nashville Superspeedway.

On April 7, 2022, Byron drove the No. 7 for Spire Motorsports, giving the team its first Truck Series win at Martinsville.

On March 9, 2023, it was announced that Byron would return to Kyle Busch Motorsports for the first time in six years, driving the No. 51 at Bristol Dirt, Darlington, and North Wilkesboro.

=== Xfinity Series ===
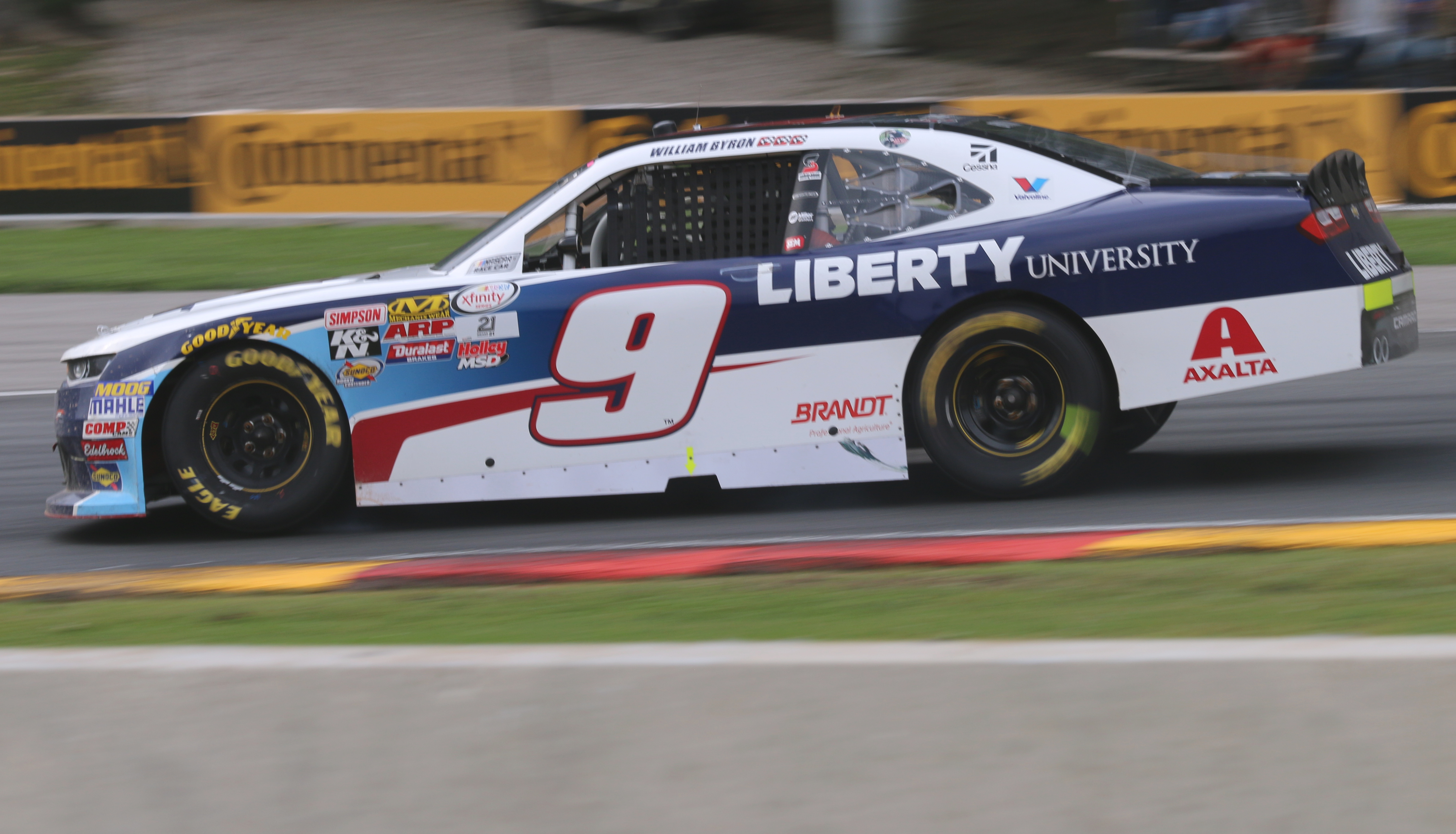
Byron's No. 9 at Road America in 2017

On August 18, 2016, Byron and Hendrick Motorsports announced they had signed a multi-year driver contract, with Byron running full-time in the NASCAR Xfinity Series driving the No. 9 Chevrolet Camaro SS for JR Motorsports in 2017. Byron finished second at Michigan, just losing out to Denny Hamlin. One week later, Byron won his first career race at Iowa after Christopher Bell wrecked late in the race, battling for a win with Ryan Sieg, who eventually placed second. He ended up winning again the week later in an overtime finish at Daytona. Byron also won at Indianapolis Motor Speedway for the third Xfinity victory of his career; he would add a fourth win when the series visited Phoenix for the penultimate race of the season. The Phoenix win also placed Byron among the four drivers eligible to race for the series championship at Homestead–Miami Speedway. At the final race in Homestead, Byron held off his Championship 4 teammate Elliott Sadler in the final laps to win the 2017 NASCAR Xfinity Series Championship.

In 2022, Byron returned to the Xfinity series for the first time since 2017. He drove the JR Motorsports No. 88 to a second-place finish at Texas and 26th at New Hampshire. Driving the Hendrick Motorsports No. 17 at Watkins Glen, Byron fiercely battled Ty Gibbs for the lead throughout most of the race until they both spun off-course during the final restart, resulting in Byron finishing 25th.

In 2023, Byron returned to the No. 17 for a single race at COTA, finishing runner-up to A. J. Allmendinger.

Byron drove the No. 17 in four races throughout 2024, with those races being at Phoenix, Darlington, Pocono, and Watkins Glen.

In 2025, Byron drove the No. 17 to victory lane at Charlotte.

=== Cup Series ===
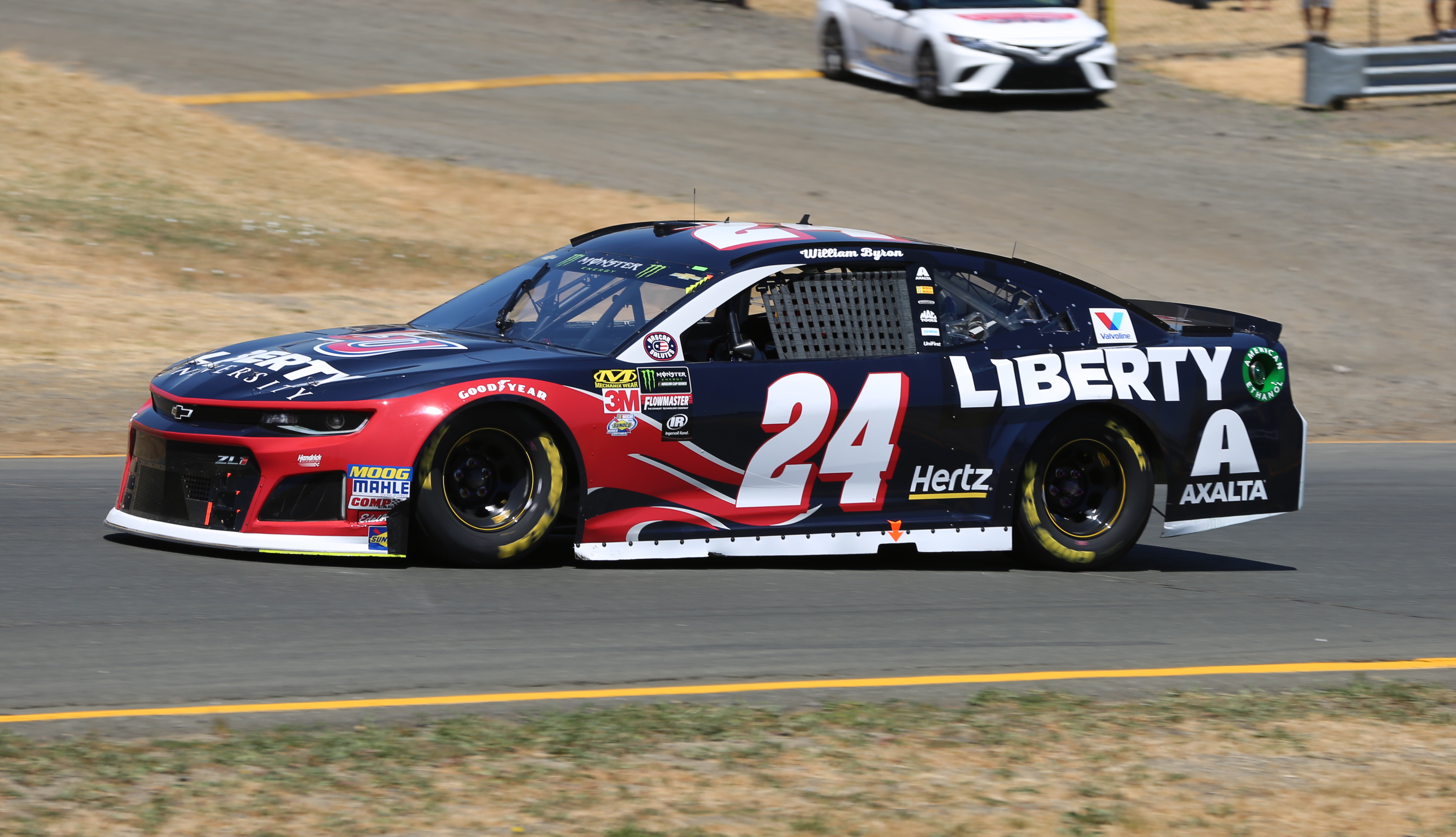
Byron's No. 24 during the 2018 Toyota/Save Mart 350

==== 2018: Rookie of the Year ====
On August 9, 2017, Hendrick Motorsports announced Byron would be the new replacement for Kasey Kahne in the No. 5 car in 2018, while continuing current sponsorship with Axalta Coating Systems and Liberty University. Twenty days later, however, HMS announced Byron would instead drive the No. 24, while Chase Elliott moved to the rebranded No. 9 car. Byron inherited Kahne's No. 5 team, including crew chief Darian Grubb. On October 10, 2018, Hendrick Motorsports announced that Grubb will move on to a technical director position while Chad Knaus takes over crew chief duties for Byron and the No. 24 in 2019. Byron clinched Rookie of the Year honors after the penultimate race of the year at ISM Raceway, becoming the second driver next to Erik Jones to win Rookie of the Year in consecutive seasons in each of the three national series.

==== 2019: Playoff debut ====
Byron started the 2019 season on a strong note as he won the Daytona 500 pole, heading a Hendrick lockout of the first two rows. His consistency in the regular season landed him in the playoffs for the first time in his career. Byron finished sixth at the Charlotte Roval to advance to the Round of 12. He was eliminated in the Round of 12 after the Kansas race.

==== 2020: First win ====
In Duel 2 of the 2020 Bluegreen Vacations Duels, Byron scored the win to start fourth in the Daytona 500, but ultimately he would finish 40th in the race. He scored his first career Cup victory at the track in August at the Coke Zero Sugar 400, avoiding various wrecks and winning in overtime to advance to the playoffs. Byron, however, was eliminated following the first round at Bristol after finishing 38th due to an accident. Earlier in 2020, Byron signed an extension to his contract with Hendrick Motorsports through the 2022 Season.

==== 2021 ====
Byron started the 2021 season by qualifying second at the 2021 Daytona 500 while teammate Alex Bowman took the pole. After a 26th place finish at the Daytona 500 and a 33rd place finish in Daytona International Speedway's infield road course, Byron won the third race of the season at Homestead–Miami Speedway, leading 101 of the final 112 laps. Byron's victory started an eleven-race top-ten streak, with top-five finishes at Martinsville, Talladega, Darlington, and Dover. Byron's top-ten streak would come to an end at the Circuit of the Americas road course, as he would finish eleventh. Byron rebounded in the following race with a top-five finish at Charlotte in the Coca-Cola 600, finishing fourth. After finishing 35th at Sonoma Raceway following a wreck, Byron rebounded with back-to-back third-place finishes at Nashville Superspeedway and the first of a double-header at Pocono Raceway. Byron struggled in the next four races, finishing outside the top-ten, but would finish sixth at the 2021 Go Bowling at The Glen. During the playoffs, Byron made it to the Round of 12, but struggled with poor finishes at Las Vegas and Talladega. Following the Charlotte Roval race, he was eliminated from the Round of 8. He finished the season with a career-high tenth in the points standings.

==== 2022 ====
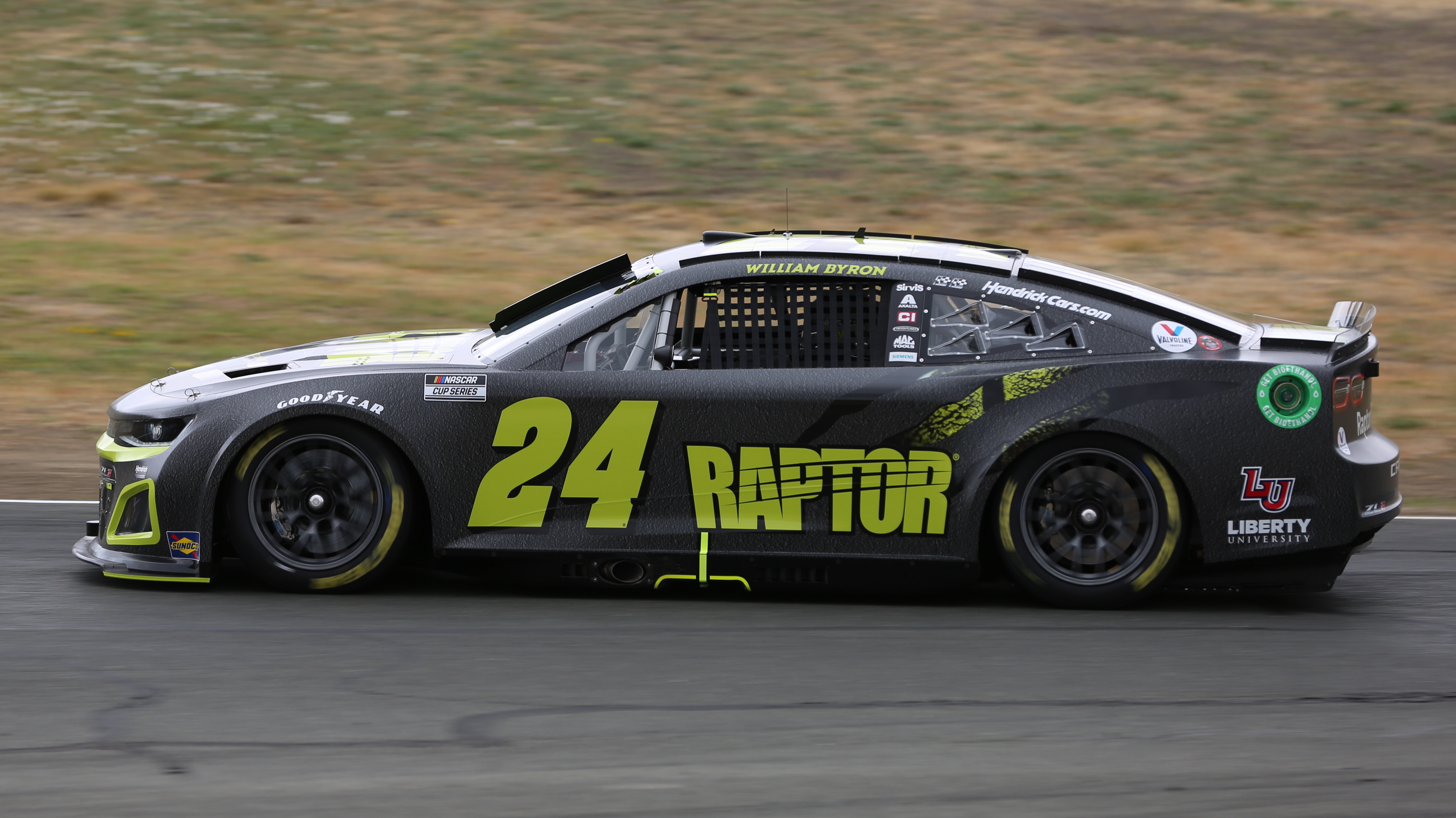
Byron’s No. 24 car at Sonoma Raceway in 2022

During the 2022 season, Byron started with two DNFs at the 2022 Daytona 500 and Fontana, but rebounded with wins at Atlanta and Martinsville. On May 5, 2022, Byron received a contract extension to remain at Hendrick Motorsports through 2025. At Darlington, Byron was close to scoring his third win when Joey Logano rattled his cage with two laps to go. On July 28, 2022, three days prior to the Indianapolis road race, the generator of the No. 24's hauler caught fire. The car was not damaged by the blaze. At the Texas playoff race, Byron spun Denny Hamlin towards the infield grass during a late-caution period; he was subsequently fined US$50,000 and the No. 24 was docked 25 driver and owner points. On October 6, 2022, the National Motorsports Appeals Panel rescinded the points penalty and instead amended the fine to US$100,000, placing Byron back to seventh in the playoff standings. Byron was eliminated following the Round of 8 after finishing eighth at Martinsville. He finished the season in a career-best sixth in the points standings.

==== 2023: Breakout; dominant season ====
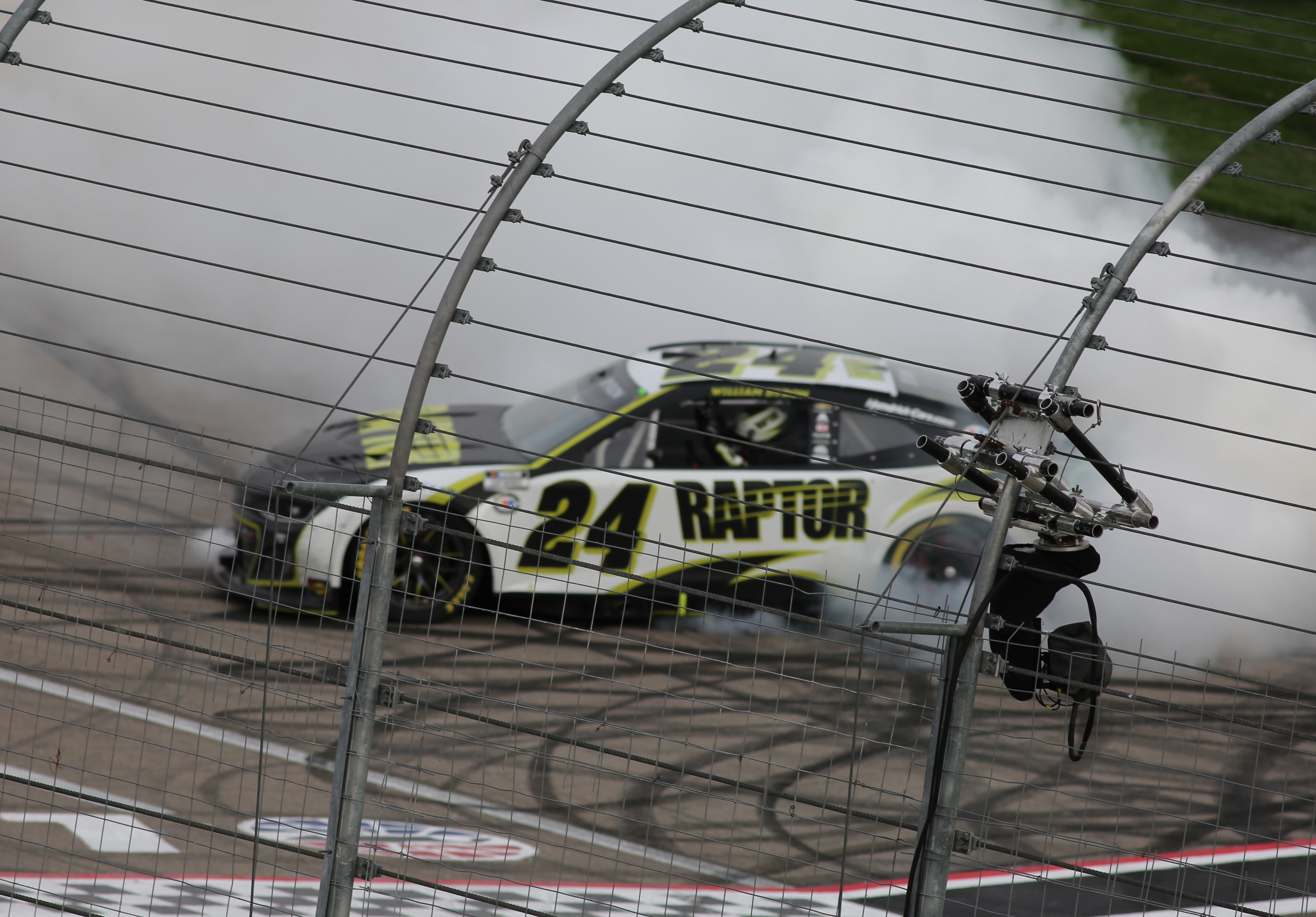
Byron celebrating after winning the 2023 Pennzoil 400

Byron started the 2023 season with a 34th-place DNF at the 2023 Daytona 500. He later scored back-to-back wins at Las Vegas and Phoenix. On March 15, 2023, the No. 24 was served an L2 penalty after unapproved hood louvers were found installed on the car during pre-race inspection at Phoenix; as a result, the team was docked 100 driver and owner points and ten playoff points. In addition, crew chief Rudy Fugle was suspended for four races and fined US$100,000. On March 29, the National Motorsports Appeals Panel amended the penalty, upholding the fine and Fugle's suspension but restoring the owner, driver, and playoff points. On April 6, the No. 24 was served an L1 penalty after alterations to the car's greenhouse were discovered during post-race inspection following the Richmond race; as a result, the team was docked 60 driver and owner points and five playoff points. In addition, interim crew chief Brian Campe was suspended for two races and fined US$75,000. At Darlington, Byron scored his seventh career win and the overall 100th win for the No. 24. He scored his fourth win of the season at Atlanta after the race was shortened by rain. Byron claimed his fifth victory at Watkins Glen. Byron's sixth win of the season came in the Round of 12 opener at Texas. The win also marked Hendrick Motorsports' 300th victory in the Cup Series. Following the season finale at Phoenix, Byron finished the 2023 season third in the points standings.

==== 2024: Daytona 500 champion and late-season controversy ====
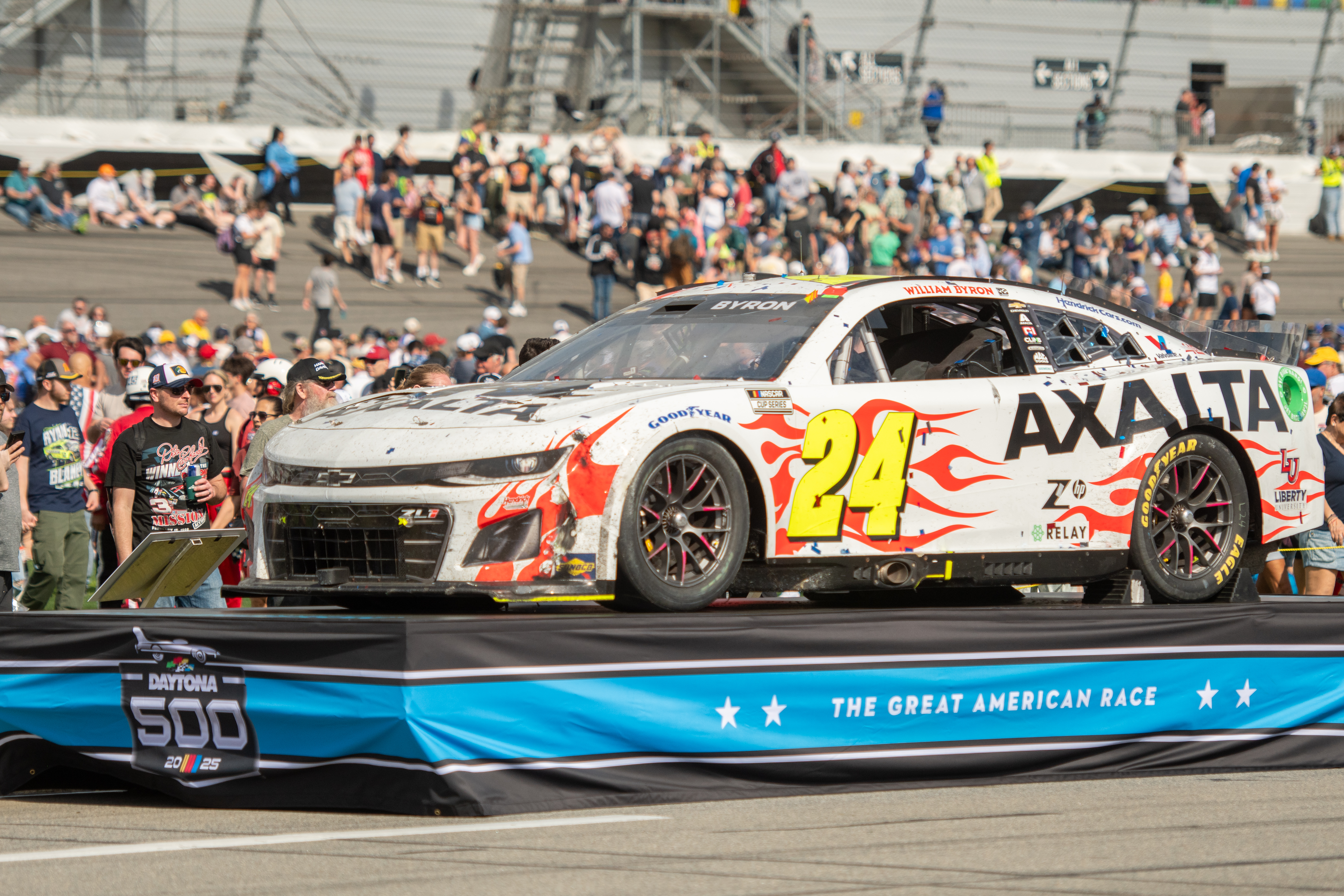
Byron’s 2024 Daytona 500 race-winning car

Byron started the 2024 season by winning the 2024 Daytona 500. The win was the first Daytona 500 win for the No. 24 since 2005 by Jeff Gordon and the first Daytona 500 win for Hendrick Motorsports since 2014 by Dale Earnhardt Jr. It was also a special win because the win occurred forty years to the date Hendrick Motorsports ran its first ever race as a team in the 1984 Daytona 500. A month later, he scored his second win of the season at the Circuit of the Americas. On April 7, Byron won his third race of the season, as he and his teammates Kyle Larson and Chase Elliott took the top three spots at Martinsville on Hendrick Motorsports' fortieth anniversary. Despite not winning a race during the playoffs, Byron made the Championship 4 following Martinsville after Christopher Bell was penalized for using the "Hail Melon" maneuver, which was banned by NASCAR after 2022. His entry to Championship 4 was also marred by controversies involving intra-manufacturer team orders where Austin Dillon and Ross Chastain appeared to block other cars in Byron's favor, for which both (and Bubba Wallace, which was deemed to have done similar to help Bell's championship chances) received penalties. Byron ultimately came up short in the championship race and finished third in the standings.

==== 2025: Second Daytona 500 victory and Regular Season Champion ====
Byron started the 2025 season with his second consecutive Daytona 500 win, becoming the fifth driver in history to win the race in back-to-back seasons. On May 23, Byron received a contract extension to remain at Hendrick Motorsports through 2029. After staying consistent, he picked up his second win of the season at Iowa. During the playoffs, Byron won at Martinsville to make the Championship 4.

==== 2026: Early season woes and late-season success ====
Byron's No. 24 car at Las Vegas Motor Speedway in 2026

Byron started the 2026 season with a 12th place finish at the 2026 Daytona 500. After making "The Chase" without a win in the regular season, Byron won at Martinsville in November 2026 leading the most laps of his season. A week later in the season finale at Homestead, Byron would cap off the season with a 3rd place finish, leaving him 8th in the drivers' standings at the end of the season. 2026 would be the last season that Byron would be paired with Rudy Fugle as his crew chief, as it was announced later that year after the season was completed that Fugle would be moving over to the No. 48 to crew chief for teammate Alex Bowman.

== Personal life ==
Byron was born the younger of two children in Charlotte, North Carolina. His parents are Bill and Dana Byron, and his sister is Kathryn. He attended Charlotte Country Day School while taking online classes through sponsor Liberty University, graduating in May 2016. Byron is also currently a student at Liberty University, earning his college degree, majoring in business communication. Byron is an Eagle Scout.

Byron is a Christian, saying, “I feel like getting into racing was God’s plan for me, so I can spread my faith through the racing garage and with race fans — that’s why it’s been so special."

On May 4, 2021, Byron announced on Twitter that his mother, Dana, was being treated for a MALT lymphoma tumor in the left side of her brain. He revealed on July 27 that Dana was able to heal from the disease.

== Motorsports career results ==
=== Racing career summary ===
Season	Series	Team	Races	Wins	Top 5	Top 10	Points	Position
2015	CARS Super Late Model Tour	Jeff Fultz	3	1	3	3	97	22nd
2015	NASCAR K&N Pro Series West	HScott Motorsports with Justin Marks	2	0	2	2	70	35th
2015	NASCAR K&N Pro Series East	HScott Motorsports with Justin Marks	14	4	5	11	546	**1st**
2015	ARCA Racing Series	Venturini Motorsports	2	0	1	1	305	76th
2015	NASCAR Camping World Truck Series	Kyle Busch Motorsports	1	0	0	0	13	78th
2016	ARCA Racing Series	Venturini Motorsports	2	0	1	2	415	58th
2016	NASCAR Camping World Truck Series	Kyle Busch Motorsports	23	7	11	16	2199	5th
2017	NASCAR Xfinity Series	JR Motorsports	33	4	12	22	4034	**1st**
2018	NASCAR K&N Pro Series West	Jefferson Pitts Racing	1	0	1	1	41	32nd
2018	Monster Energy NASCAR Cup Series	Hendrick Motorsports	36	0	0	4	587	23rd
2019	Monster Energy NASCAR Cup Series	Hendrick Motorsports	36	0	5	13	2275	11th
2020	NASCAR Cup Series	Hendrick Motorsports	36	1	4	14	2247	14th
2021	NASCAR Camping World Truck Series	Rackley W.A.R.	1	0	0	0	0	NC†
2021	NASCAR Cup Series	Hendrick Motorsports	36	1	12	20	2306	10th
2022	NASCAR Camping World Truck Series	Spire Motorsports	1	1	1	1	0	NC†
2022	NASCAR Xfinity Series	JR Motorsports	2	0	1	1	0	NC†
2022	NASCAR Xfinity Series	Hendrick Motorsports	1	0	0	0	0	NC†
2022	NASCAR Cup Series	Hendrick Motorsports	36	2	5	11	2378	6th
2023	ASA Stars National Tour	Anthony Campi Racing	2	0	2	2	173	19th
2023	NASCAR Craftsman Truck Series	Kyle Busch Motorsports	3	0	2	2	0	NC†
2023	NASCAR Xfinity Series	Hendrick Motorsports	1	0	1	1	0	NC†
2023	NASCAR Cup Series	Hendrick Motorsports	36	6	15	21	5040	**3rd**
2024	CARS Late Model Stock Car Tour	JR Motorsports	1	0	1	1	0	NC†
2024	NASCAR Xfinity Series	Hendrick Motorsports	4	0	1	1	0	NC†
2024	NASCAR Cup Series	Hendrick Motorsports	36	3	13	21	5034	**3rd**
2025	NASCAR Craftsman Truck Series	Spire Motorsports	2	0	1	1	0	NC†
2025	NASCAR Xfinity Series	Hendrick Motorsports	2	1	2	2	0	NC†
2025	NASCAR Cup Series	Hendrick Motorsports	36	3	11	16	5004	4th
2026	NASCAR O'Reilly Auto Parts Series	JR Motorsports	3	0	1	2	0	NC†
2026	NASCAR Cup Series	Hendrick Motorsports	36	1	8	18	2344	8th

^{†} As Byron was a guest driver, he was ineligible for championship points.

=== NASCAR ===
(key) (Bold – Pole position awarded by qualifying time. Italics – Pole position earned by points standings or practice time. * – Most laps led.)

==== Cup Series ====
NASCAR Cup Series results
Year	Team	No.	Make	1	2	3	4	5	6	7	8	9	10	11	12	13	14	15	16	17	18	19	20	21	22	23	24	25	26	27	28	29	30	31	32	33	34	35	36	NCSC	Pts	Ref
2018	Hendrick Motorsports	24	Chevy	DAY; 23	ATL; 18	LVS; 27	PHO; 12	CAL; 15	MAR; 20	TEX; 10	BRI; 18	RCH; 12	TAL; 29	DOV; 14	KAN; 33	CLT; 39	POC; 18	MCH; 13	SON; 25	CHI; 20	DAY; 32	KEN; 20	NHA; 14	POC; 6	GLN; 8	MCH; 36	BRI; 23	DAR; 35	IND; 19	LVS; 37	RCH; 20	ROV; 34	DOV; 19	TAL; 20	KAN; 38	MAR; 39	TEX; 16	PHO; 9	HOM; 24	23rd	587	
2019	Hendrick Motorsports	24	Chevy	**DAY**; 21	ATL; 17	LVS; 16	PHO; 24	CAL; 15	MAR; 22	TEX; 6	BRI; 16	RCH; 13	TAL; 21	DOV; 8	KAN; 20	**CLT**; 9	**POC**; 9	MCH; 18	SON; 19	CHI; 8	DAY; 2	KEN; 18	NHA; 12	POC; 4	GLN; 21	MCH; 8	BRI; 21	**DAR**; 21	IND; 4	LVS; 7	RCH; 24	**ROV**; 6	DOV; 13	TAL; 33	KAN; 5	MAR; 2	TEX; 17	PHO; 17	HOM; 39	11th	2275	
2020	Hendrick Motorsports	24	Chevy	DAY; 40	LVS; 22	CAL; 15	PHO; 10	DAR; 35	DAR; 12	CLT; 20	CLT; 12	BRI; 8	ATL; 33	MAR; 8	HOM; 9	TAL; 11	POC; 14	POC; 7	IND; 27	KEN; 11	TEX; 37	KAN; 10	NHA; 11	MCH; 14	MCH; 12	DRC; 8	DOV; 28	DOV; 4	DAY; 1	DAR; 5	RCH; 21	BRI; 38	LVS; 25	TAL; 4	ROV; 6*	KAN; 8	TEX; 13	MAR; 35	PHO; 9	14th	2247	
2021	Hendrick Motorsports	24	Chevy	DAY; 26	DRC; 33	HOM; 1*	LVS; 8	PHO; 8	ATL; 8	BRD; 6	MAR; 4	RCH; 7	TAL; 2	KAN; 9	DAR; 4	DOV; 4	COA; 11	CLT; 4	SON; 35	NSH; 3	POC; 3	POC; 12	**ROA**; 33	ATL; 20	NHA; 21	GLN; 6	**IRC**; 33	MCH; 2	DAY; 37	DAR; 34	RCH; 19	BRI; 3	LVS; 18	TAL; 36	ROV; 11*	TEX; 2	KAN; 6	MAR; 5	PHO; 17	10th	2306	
2022	Hendrick Motorsports	24	Chevy	DAY; 38	CAL; 34	LVS; 5	PHO; 18	ATL; 1*	COA; 12	RCH; 3	MAR; 1*	BRD; 18	TAL; 15*	DOV; 22	DAR; 13	KAN; 16	CLT; 32	GTW; 19	SON; 9	NSH; 35	ROA; 16	ATL; 30	NHA; 11	POC; 12	IRC; 31	MCH; 12	RCH; 11	GLN; 22	DAY; 34	DAR; 8	KAN; 6	BRI; 3	TEX; 7	TAL; 12	ROV; 16	LVS; 13	**HOM**; 12	MAR; 7	PHO; 6	6th	2378	
2023	Hendrick Motorsports	24	Chevy	DAY; 34	CAL; 25	LVS; 1*	PHO; 1	ATL; 32	**COA**; 5	RCH; 24*	BRD; 13	MAR; 23	TAL; 7	DOV; 4*	**KAN**; 3	DAR; 1	CLT; 2	GTW; 8	SON; 14	NSH; 6	CSC; 13	ATL; 1	NHA; 24	**POC**; 14*	RCH; 21	MCH; 35	IRC; 14	GLN; 1*	DAY; 8	DAR; 4	KAN; 15	BRI; 9	TEX; 1	TAL; 2	ROV; 2	LVS; 7	HOM; 4	MAR; 13	**PHO**; 4	3rd	5040	
2024	Hendrick Motorsports	24	Chevy	DAY; 1	ATL; 17	LVS; 10	PHO; 18	BRI; 35	**COA**; 1*	RCH; 7	MAR; 1*	TEX; 3	TAL; 7	DOV; 33	KAN; 23	DAR; 6	CLT; 3	GTW; 15	SON; 30	IOW; 2	NHA; 26	NSH; 19	CSC; 8	POC; 4	IND; 38	RCH; 13	MCH; 2	DAY; 27	DAR; 30	ATL; 9	GLN; 34	BRI; 17	KAN; 2	TAL; 3	ROV; 3	LVS; 4	HOM; 6	MAR; 6	PHO; 3	3rd	5034	
2025	Hendrick Motorsports	24	Chevy	DAY; 1	ATL; 27	COA; 2	**PHO**; 6	LVS; 4	HOM; 12	MAR; 22	**DAR**; 2*	BRI; 6	TAL; 3	TEX; 13	KAN; 24	CLT; 2*	NSH; 5	MCH; 28*	MXC; 9	POC; 27	ATL; 37	CSC; 40	SON; 8	DOV; 32	IND; 16	IOW; 1*	GLN; 4	RCH; 12	DAY; 19	DAR; 21	GTW; 11	BRI; 12	NHA; 3	KAN; 9	ROV; 11	LVS; 36	TAL; 25	**MAR**; 1*	PHO; 33	4th	5004	
2026	Hendrick Motorsports	24	Chevy	DAY; 12	ATL; 28	COA; 13	PHO; 7	LVS; 3	DAR; 8	MAR; 5	BRI; 30	KAN; 7	TAL; 35	TEX; 8	GLN; 36	CLT; 9	NSH; 30	MCH; 18	POC; 3	COR; 32	SON; 12	CHI; 4*	ATL; 16	NWS; 12	IND; 21	IOW; 9	RCH; 9	NHA; 30	DAY; 22	DAR; 37	GTW; 4	BRI; 9	KAN; 7	LVS; 6	CLT; 39	PHO; 21	TAL; 2	MAR; 1*	HOM; 3	8th	2344	
2027	Hendrick Motorsports	24	Chevy	DAY	ATL	COA	PHO	LVS	DAR	BRI	MAR	TAL	TEX	KAN	DOV	CLT	NSS	POC	MCH	CHI	IOW	SON	ATL	IND	COR	BRI	GTW	DAY	DAR	RCH	GLN	NHA	KAN	LVS	CLT	PHO	TAL	MAR	HOM			

===== Daytona 500 =====
Year	Team	Manufacturer	Start	Finish
2018	Hendrick Motorsports	Chevrolet	33	23
2019	Hendrick Motorsports	Chevrolet	**1**	21
2020	Hendrick Motorsports	Chevrolet	4	40
2021	Hendrick Motorsports	Chevrolet	2	26
2022	Hendrick Motorsports	Chevrolet	23	38
2023	Hendrick Motorsports	Chevrolet	21	34
2024	Hendrick Motorsports	Chevrolet	18	**1**
2025	Hendrick Motorsports	Chevrolet	5	**1**
2026	Hendrick Motorsports	Chevrolet	39	12
2027	Hendrick Motorsports	Chevrolet		

==== O'Reilly Auto Parts Series ====
NASCAR O'Reilly Auto Parts Series results
Year	Team	No.	Make	1	2	3	4	5	6	7	8	9	10	11	12	13	14	15	16	17	18	19	20	21	22	23	24	25	26	27	28	29	30	31	32	33	NOAPSC	Pts	Ref
2017	JR Motorsports	9	Chevy	DAY; 9	ATL; 7	LVS; 14	**PHO**; 4	CAL; 5	TEX; 7	BRI; 12	RCH; 30	TAL; 36	CLT; 14	DOV; 6	POC; 12	MCH; 2	IOW; 1	DAY; 1*	KEN; 7	NHA; 3	IND; 1	IOW; 9	GLN; 10	MOH; 25	BRI; 22	ROA; 6	DAR; 5	RCH; 7	CHI; 33	KEN; 18	**DOV**; 3	CLT; 16	KAN; 4	TEX; 9	PHO; 1	HOM; 3	1st	4034	
2022	JR Motorsports	88	Chevy	DAY	CAL	LVS	PHO	ATL	COA	RCH	MAR	TAL	DOV	DAR	TEX; 2	CLT	PIR	NSH	ROA	ATL	NHA; 26	POC	IRC	MCH													79th	0^{1}	
2022	Hendrick Motorsports	17	Chevy																						**GLN**; 25*	DAY	DAR	KAN	BRI	TEX	TAL	ROV	LVS	HOM	MAR	PHO	79th	0^{1}	
2023	Hendrick Motorsports	17	Chevy	DAY	CAL	LVS	PHO	ATL	COA; 2	RCH	MAR	TAL	DOV	DAR	CLT	PIR	SON	NSH	CSC	ATL	NHA	POC	ROA	MCH	IRC	GLN	DAY	DAR	KAN	BRI	TEX	ROV	LVS	HOM	MAR	PHO	78th	0^{1}	
2024	Hendrick Motorsports	17	Chevy	DAY	ATL	LVS	PHO; 23	COA	RCH	MAR	TEX	TAL	DOV	DAR; 11	CLT	PIR	SON	IOW	NHA	NSH	CSC	POC; 3	IND	MCH	DAY	DAR	ATL	GLN; 12	BRI	KAN	TAL	ROV	LVS	HOM	MAR	PHO	84th	0^{1}	
2025	Hendrick Motorsports	17	Chevy	DAY	ATL	COA; 2	PHO	LVS	HOM	MAR	DAR	BRI	CAR	TAL	TEX	CLT; 1	NSH	MXC	POC	ATL	CSC	SON	DOV	IND	IOW	GLN	DAY	PIR	GTW	BRI	KAN	ROV	LVS	TAL	MAR	PHO	77th	0^{1}	
2026	JR Motorsports	88	Chevy	DAY	ATL	COA	PHO; 13	LVS	DAR	MAR	CAR	BRI	KAN; 6	TAL	TEX	GLN	DOV	CLT	NSH	POC; 3	COR	SON	CHI	ATL	IND	IOW	DAY	DAR	GTW	BRI	LVS	CLT	PHO	TAL	MAR	HOM	76th	0^{1}	

==== Craftsman Truck Series ====
NASCAR Craftsman Truck Series results
Year	Team	No.	Make	1	2	3	4	5	6	7	8	9	10	11	12	13	14	15	16	17	18	19	20	21	22	23	24	25	NCTC	Pts	Ref
2015	Kyle Busch Motorsports	9	Toyota	DAY	ATL	MAR	KAN	CLT	DOV	TEX	GTW	IOW	KEN	ELD	POC	MCH	BRI	MSP	CHI	NHA	LVS	TAL	MAR	TEX	PHO; 31	HOM			78th	13	
2016	Kyle Busch Motorsports	9	Toyota	DAY; 13	ATL; 32	MAR; 3	KAN; 1	DOV; 11*	CLT; 10	TEX; 1	IOW; 1*	GTW; 17*	KEN; 1*	ELD; 14	POC; 1*	BRI; 4	MCH; 4	MSP; 10	CHI; 30	**NHA**; 1*	LVS; 5	TAL; 10	MAR; 8	TEX; 6	**PHO**; 27*	**HOM**; 1			5th	2199	
2021	Rackley W.A.R.	27	Chevy	DAY	DRC	LVS	ATL	BRD	RCH	KAN	DAR	COA	CLT	TEX	NSH; 36	POC	KNX	GLN	GTW	DAR	BRI	LVS	TAL	MAR	PHO				116th	0^{1}	
2022	Spire Motorsports	7	Chevy	DAY	LVS	ATL	COA	MAR; 1*	BRD	DAR	KAN	TEX	CLT	GTW	SON	KNX	NSH	MOH	POC	IRP	RCH	KAN	BRI	TAL	HOM	PHO			88th	0^{1}	
2023	Kyle Busch Motorsports	51	Chevy	DAY	LVS	ATL	COA	TEX	BRD; 3	MAR	KAN	DAR; 4	NWS; 11	CLT	GTW	NSH	MOH	POC	RCH	IRP	MLW	KAN	BRI	TAL	HOM	PHO			88th	0^{1}	
2025	Spire Motorsports	07	Chevy	DAY	ATL	LVS	HOM	MAR; 14	BRI	CAR	TEX	KAN; 2	NWS	CLT	NSH	MCH	POC	LRP	IRP	GLN	RCH	DAR	BRI	NHA	ROV	TAL	MAR	PHO	79th	0^{1}	

^{*} Season still in progress
^{1} Ineligible for series points

=== ARCA Racing Series ===
(key) (Bold – Pole position awarded by qualifying time. Italics – Pole position earned by points standings or practice time. * – Most laps led.)

ARCA Racing Series results
Year	Team	No.	Make	1	2	3	4	5	6	7	8	9	10	11	12	13	14	15	16	17	18	19	20	ARSC	Pts	Ref
2015	Venturini Motorsports	55	Toyota	DAY	MOB	NSH	SLM	TAL	TOL	NJE	POC	MCH	CHI	WIN	IOW	IRP; 2*	POC	BLN	ISF	DSF	SLM	**KEN**; 32	KAN	76th	305	
2016	Venturini Motorsports	55	Toyota	DAY; 2	NSH	SLM	TAL	TOL	NJE															58th	415	
2016	Venturini Motorsports	15	Toyota							POC; 8	MCH	MAD	WIN	IOW	IRP	POC	BLN	ISF	DSF	SLM	CHI	KEN	KAN	58th	415	

==== K&N Pro Series East ====
NASCAR K&N Pro Series East results
Year	Team	No.	Make	1	2	3	4	5	6	7	8	9	10	11	12	13	14	NKNPSEC	Pts	Ref
2015	HScott Motorsports with Justin Marks	9	Chevy	NSM; 7	GRE; 1*	BRI; 2	**IOW**; 1*	BGS; 15	LGY; 1*	COL; 14	**NHA**; 1	IOW; 13	GLN; 7	**MOT**; 8*	VIR; 10	**RCH**; 6	DOV; 9	1st	546	

==== K&N Pro Series West ====
NASCAR K&N Pro Series West results
Year	Team	No.	Make	1	2	3	4	5	6	7	8	9	10	11	12	13	14	NKNPSWC	Pts	Ref
2015	HScott Motorsports with Justin Marks	91	Chevy	KCR	IRW	TUS	IOW	SHA	SON; 5	SLS	IOW	EVG	CNS	MER	AAS	PHO; 2		35th	70	
2018	Jefferson Pitts Racing	27	Chevy	KCR	TUS	TUS	OSS	CNS	SON; 3	DCS	IOW	EVG	GTW	LVS	MER	AAS	KCR	32nd	41	

=== CARS Late Model Stock Car Tour ===
(key) (Bold – Pole position awarded by qualifying time. Italics – Pole position earned by points standings or practice time. * – Most laps led. ** – All laps led.)

CARS Late Model Stock Car Tour results
Year	Team	No.	Make	1	2	3	4	5	6	7	8	9	10	11	12	13	14	15	16	17	CLMSCTC	Pts	Ref
2024	JR Motorsports	24B	Chevy	SNM	HCY	AAS	OCS	ACE	TCM	LGY	DOM	CRW; 2	HCY	NWS	ACE	WCS	FLC	SBO	TCM	NWS	N/A	0	

=== CARS Super Late Model Tour ===
(key)

CARS Super Late Model Tour results
Year	Team	No.	Make	1	2	3	4	5	6	7	8	9	10	CSLMTC	Pts	Ref
2015	Jeff Fultz	9	Chevy	SNM; DNQ	ROU	HCY; 1*	SNM	TCM	MMS; 2	ROU	CON	MYB	HCY; 4	22nd	97	

=== ASA STARS National Tour ===
(key) (Bold – Pole position awarded by qualifying time. Italics – Pole position earned by points standings or practice time. * – Most laps led. ** – All laps led.)

ASA STARS National Tour results
Year	Team	No.	Make	1	2	3	4	5	6	7	8	9	10	ASNTC	Pts	Ref
2023	Anthony Campi Racing	24	Chevy	FIF	MAD	NWS; 2	HCY; 2*	MLW	AND	WIR	TOL	WIN	NSV	19th	173	

Sporting positions
Preceded by Ricky Stenhouse Jr.	Daytona 500 Winner; 2024-2025	Succeeded by Tyler Reddick
Preceded by Erik Jones	NASCAR Cup Series Rookie of the Year; 2018	Succeeded by Daniel Hemric
Preceded by Ben Rhodes	NASCAR K&N Pro Series East Champion; 2015	Succeeded by Justin Haley
Preceded by Daniel Suárez	NASCAR Xfinity Series Champion; 2017	Succeeded by Tyler Reddick
