= 2027 Daytona 500 =

69th Running of the Daytona 500, held at Daytona International Speedway

Race details
- Race 1 of 36 in the 2027 NASCAR Cup Series
- 2027 Daytona 500 logo
- Date: February 21, 2026
- Location: Daytona International Speedway in Daytona Beach, Florida
- Course: Permanent racing facility 2.500 mi (4.023 km)
- Scheduled distance: 200 laps, 500 mi (800 km)

Television in the United States
- Network: FOX
- Announcers: Mike Joy, Clint Bowyer, and Kevin Harvick

Radio in the United States
- Radio: MRN

The 2027 Daytona 500 is an upcoming NASCAR Cup Series race and the 69th running of the event. It will be held on Sunday, February 21, 2027, at Daytona International Speedway in Daytona Beach, Florida. It will be the first race of the 2027 NASCAR Cup Series season.

== Report ==
=== Background ===
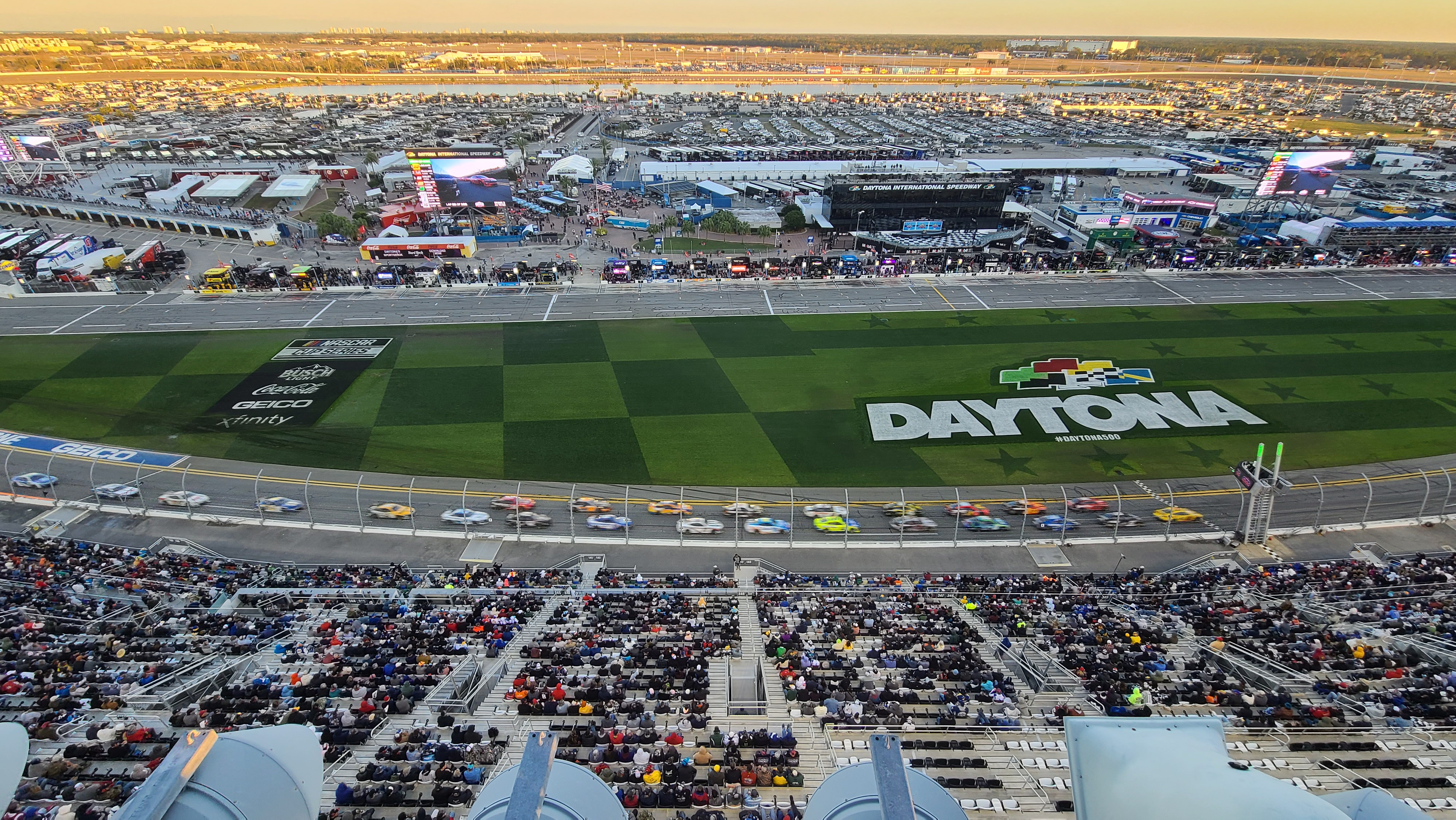
View of cars racing on the front stretch at the 2024 Daytona 500

Daytona International Speedway is one of three superspeedways to hold NASCAR races, the other two being Atlanta Motor Speedway and Talladega Superspeedway. The standard track at Daytona International Speedway is a four-turn superspeedway that is 2.5 miles (4.0 km) long. The track's turns are banked at 31 degrees, while the front stretch, the location of the finish line, is banked at 18 degrees.

Daytona announced on October 22, 2025, that the 2027 Daytona 500 would be held on February 21, 2027, to avoid a conflict with the Super Bowl rather than its traditional Presidents' Day weekend.

Storylines

This race marks the last Daytona 500 for Alex Bowman and Jimmie Johnson, both of whom are retiring at the end of the season. With it being Johnson's final race, Johnson will be running the No. 48 for Legacy Motor Club. Alex Bowman will run a different number for the race.

==== Entry list ====
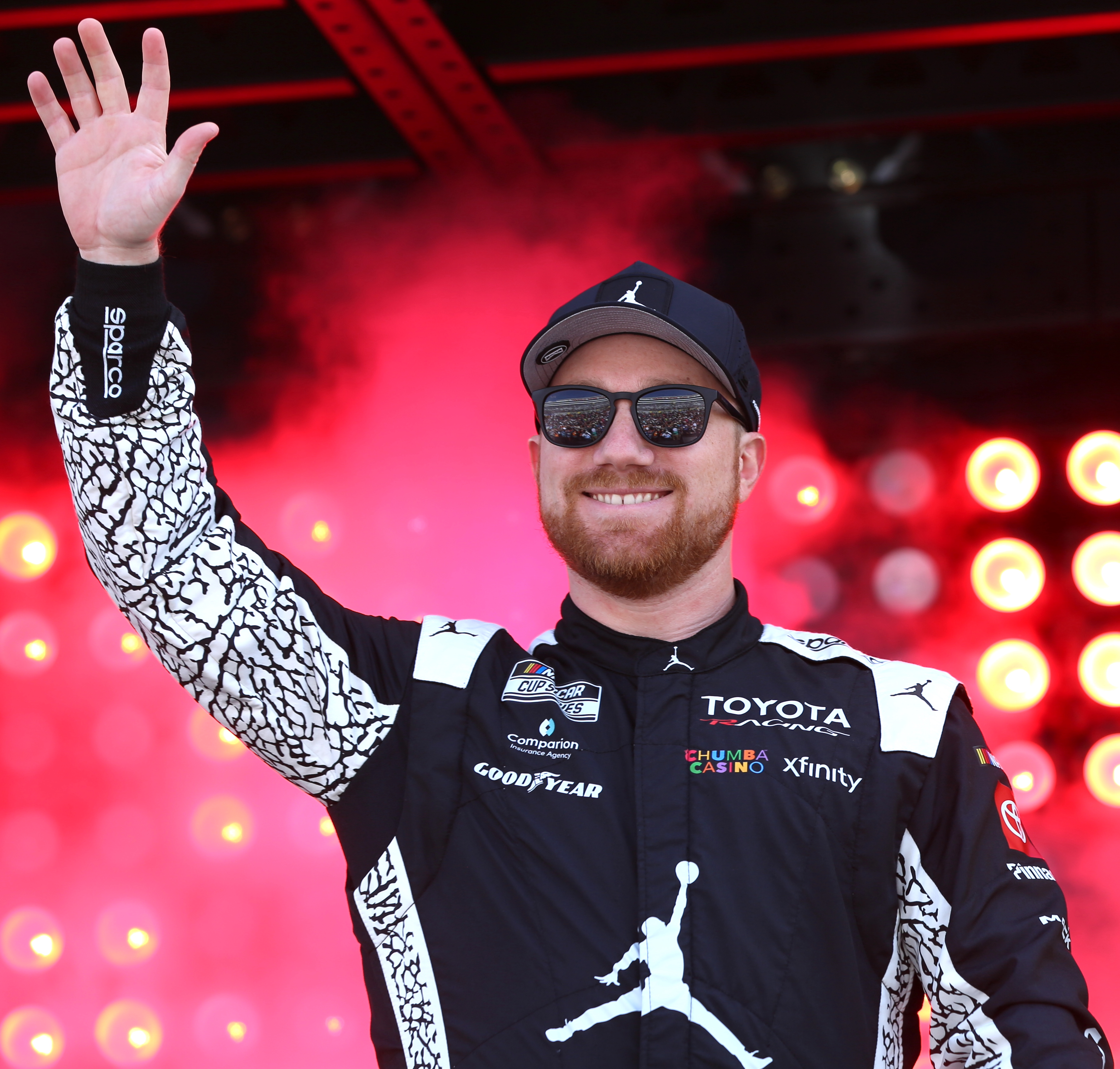
Tyler Reddick, the defending race winner, took his first Daytona 500 victory in the final lap.

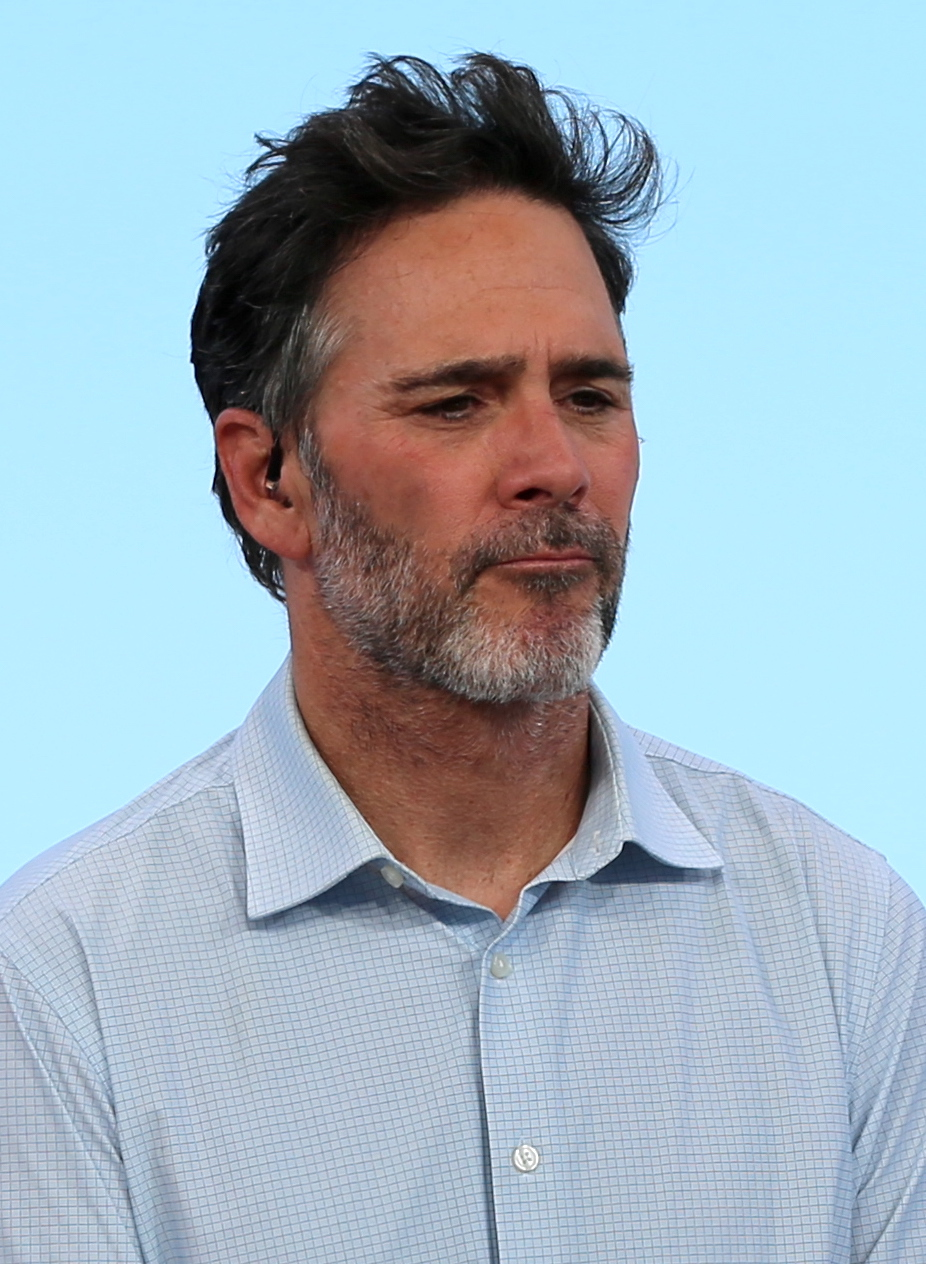
Jimmie Johnson will make his final Cup Series start in the No. 48 for his co-owner Legacy Motor Club team.

- (R) denotes rookie driver.
- (W) denotes former winner.
- (i) denotes driver who is ineligible for series driver points.

No.	Driver	Team	Manufacturer
1	Ross Chastain	Trackhouse Racing	Chevrolet
2	Austin Cindric (W)	Team Penske	Ford
3	Austin Dillon (W)	Richard Childress Racing	Chevrolet
4	Noah Gragson	Front Row Motorsports	Ford
5	Kyle Larson	Hendrick Motorsports	Chevrolet
6	Ryan Preece	RFK Racing	Ford
7	Daniel Suárez	Spire Motorsports	Chevrolet
9	Chase Elliott	Hendrick Motorsports	Chevrolet
10	Ty Dillon	Kaulig Racing	Dodge
11	Denny Hamlin (W)	Joe Gibbs Racing	Toyota
12	Ryan Blaney	Team Penske	Ford
16	A. J. Allmendinger	Kaulig Racing	Dodge
17	Chris Buescher	RFK Racing	Ford
19	Chase Briscoe	Joe Gibbs Racing	Toyota
20	Christopher Bell	Joe Gibbs Racing	Toyota
21	Jesse Love (R)	Wood Brothers Racing	Ford
22	Joey Logano (W)	Team Penske	Ford
23	Bubba Wallace	23XI Racing	Toyota
24	William Byron (W)	Hendrick Motorsports	Chevrolet
33	Austin Hill	Richard Childress Racing	Chevrolet
34	Todd Gilliland	Front Row Motorsports	Ford
38	Zane Smith	Front Row Motorsports	Ford
40	Justin Allgaier (i)	JR Motorsports	Chevrolet
41	Cole Custer	Haas Factory Team	Chevrolet
42	Josh Berry	Legacy Motor Club	Toyota
43	Erik Jones	Legacy Motor Club	Toyota
45	Tyler Reddick (W)	23XI Racing	Toyota
47	Ricky Stenhouse Jr. (W)	Hyak Motorsports	Chevrolet
48	Jimmie Johnson (W)	Legacy Motor Club	Toyota
51	Cody Ware	Rick Ware Racing	Chevrolet
54	Ty Gibbs	Joe Gibbs Racing	Toyota
60	TBA	RFK Racing	Ford
66	Josh Bilicki	Garage 66	Ford
67	Corey Heim	23XI Racing	Toyota
71	Michael McDowell (W)	Spire Motorsports	Chevrolet
77	Carson Hocevar	Spire Motorsports	Chevrolet
84	Riley Herbst	Legacy Motor Club	Toyota
88	Connor Zilisch	Trackhouse Racing	Chevrolet
97	Shane van Gisbergen	Trackhouse Racing	Chevrolet
TBA	Alex Bowman	Hendrick Motorsports	Chevrolet

== Media ==
=== Television ===
Since 2001—with the exception of 2002, 2004 and 2006—the Daytona 500 has been carried by Fox in the United States. The booth crew consisted of longtime NASCAR lap-by-lap announcer Mike Joy, Clint Bowyer, and 2007 Daytona 500 winner Kevin Harvick. 1992 and 1998 Daytona 500 winning crew chief Larry McReynolds provided insight on-site during the race.

Fox Television
Booth announcers	Pit reporters	In-race analyst
Lap-by-lap: Mike Joy; Color-commentator: Clint Bowyer; Color-commentator: Kevin Harvick	TBA	Larry McReynolds

=== Radio ===
The race was broadcast on radio by the Motor Racing Network who have covered the Daytona 500 since 1970—and simulcast on Sirius XM NASCAR Radio.

MRN Radio
Booth announcers	Turn announcers	Pit reporters
Lead announcer: TBA; Announcer: TBA; Announcer: TBA	Turns 1 & 2: TBA; Backstretch: TBA; Turns 3 & 4: TBA	TBA

Previous race: 2026 Season Finale 400 (points); 2027 The Duel at Daytona (exhibition)	NASCAR Cup Series; 2027 season	Next race: 2027 Autotrader 400
