= 2027 NASCAR Cup Series =

American motorsport season

The 2027 NASCAR Cup Series will be the 79th season for NASCAR professional stock car racing in the United States and the 56th season for the modern-era Cup Series. The preseason will feature the Wheatley Vodka Clash at Daytona International Speedway, the first time the speedway held the event since 2021, on February 13. It will be followed by the season-opening 69th running of the Daytona 500 on February 21, and will end at Homestead–Miami Speedway on November 14.

Kyle Larson enters this season as the defending Cup Series champion.

Kyle Larson of Hendrick Motorsports enters the season as the back-to-back reigning NASCAR Cup Series Champion.

This is the first season with Dodge as a manufacturer since the 2012 season; the organization will field two chartered cars under the Kaulig Racing banner.

The season will mark the first full time season without Kyle Busch starting a race since the 2002 season, following his death on May 21, 2026.

== Teams and drivers ==
The following teams and drivers are confirmed to be returning in 2027:

=== Full-time chartered teams ===
Manufacturer	Team	No.	Driver	Crew chief	Notes
Chevrolet	Haas Factory Team	41	Cole Custer	TBA	Cole Custer will return to HFT in 2027.
Chevrolet	Hendrick Motorsports	5	Kyle Larson	Cliff Daniels	Larson is signed through 2031.
Chevrolet	Hendrick Motorsports	9	Chase Elliott	Alan Gustafson	Elliott is signed through 2027.
Chevrolet	Hendrick Motorsports	24	William Byron	Adam Wall	Byron is signed through 2029. Adam Wall will replace Fugle.
Chevrolet	Hendrick Motorsports	48	Alex Bowman	Rudy Fugle	Bowman is returning to HMS for 2027 for his final full-time season. With Jimmie Johnson running the No. 48 at the Daytona 500, Bowman will run a different number for the race. Rudy Fugle will replace Blake Harris.
Chevrolet	Hyak Motorsports	47	Ricky Stenhouse Jr.	Mike Kelley	Stenhouse will return to Hyak in 2027.
Chevrolet	Richard Childress Racing	3	Austin Dillon	TBA	Dillon is likely to return to RCR in 2027.
Chevrolet	Richard Childress Racing	33	Austin Hill	Andy Street	Kyle Busch had a contract to drive for RCR in 2027, before his death in May 2026. Austin Hill took over his seat for the remainder of the season, and was extended through 2027.
Chevrolet	Rick Ware Racing	51	Cody Ware	Billy Plourde	Cody Ware is likely to return to RWR in 2027.
Chevrolet	Spire Motorsports	7	Daniel Suárez	Ryan Sparks	Suárez is returning to Spire in 2027.
Chevrolet	Spire Motorsports	71	Michael McDowell	Stephen Doran	McDowell will return to Spire in 2027. Doran will be the crew chief, moving from Trackhouse.
Chevrolet	Spire Motorsports	77	Carson Hocevar	Luke Lambert	Hocevar is signed through 2030.
Chevrolet	Trackhouse Racing	1	Ross Chastain	Brandon McSwain	Chastain is likely returning to Trackhouse in 2027.
Chevrolet	Trackhouse Racing	88	Connor Zilisch	Randall Burnett	Zilisch will stay at Trackhouse for one more year before his planned departure to Hendrick.
Chevrolet	Trackhouse Racing	97	Shane van Gisbergen	Blake Harris	Van Gisbergen signed a multi-year extension with Trackhouse during 2025. Harris will serve as the crew chief, moving from HMS.
Dodge	Kaulig Racing	10	Ty Dillon	Aaron Kramer	Ty Dillon will return to Kaulig in 2027.
Dodge	Kaulig Racing	16	A. J. Allmendinger	Trent Owens	Allmendinger will return to Kaulig in 2027.
Ford	Front Row Motorsports	4	Noah Gragson	Grant Hutchens	Gragson signed a multi-year extension with FRM during 2026.
Ford	Front Row Motorsports	34	Todd Gilliland	Chris Lawson	Gilliland signed a multi-year extension with FRM during 2026.
Ford	Front Row Motorsports	38	Zane Smith	Ryan Bergenty	Smith signed a multi-year extension in 2025.
Ford	RFK Racing	6	Ryan Preece	Derrick Finley	Brad Keselowski will leave RFK Racing as both driver and owner after 2026. Preece, who has a multi-year contract with RFK, will move to the No. 6 car from the No. 60 car.
Ford	RFK Racing	17	Chris Buescher	Scott Graves	Buescher signed a multi-year extension in 2026.
Ford	Team Penske	2	Austin Cindric	Brian Wilson	Cindric will return to Penske in 2027.
Ford	Team Penske	12	Ryan Blaney	Jonathan Hassler	Blaney signed a long-term contract extension with Penske during 2026.
Ford	Team Penske	22	Joey Logano	Paul Wolfe	Logano will return to Penske in 2027.
Ford	Wood Brothers Racing	21	Jesse Love (R)	TBA	Josh Berry will not return to WBR in 2027. Love signed a deal with the team to replace him.
Toyota	23XI Racing	23	Bubba Wallace	Davin Restivo	Wallace is likely to return to 23XI. Restivo replaces Charles Denike.
Toyota	23XI Racing	45	Tyler Reddick	Billy Scott	Reddick signed a multi-year extension with 23XI during 2026.
Toyota	23XI Racing	67	Corey Heim	Charles Denike	Heim will replace Riley Herbst for his first full-time season. Heim's number was confirmed to be the No. 67. Charles Denike moved from No. 23 to No. 67.
Toyota	Joe Gibbs Racing	11	Denny Hamlin	Chris Gayle	Hamlin will return to JGR in 2027 for what is expected to be his final full-time season.
Toyota	Joe Gibbs Racing	19	Chase Briscoe	James Small	Briscoe is likely to return to JGR in 2027.
Toyota	Joe Gibbs Racing	20	Christopher Bell	Adam Stevens	Bell will most likely return to JGR in 2027.
Toyota	Joe Gibbs Racing	54	Ty Gibbs	Tyler Allen	Gibbs is likely to return to JGR in 2027.
Toyota	Legacy Motor Club	42	Josh Berry	Chais Eliason	John Hunter Nemechek was originally announced to return in 2027, however news broke on September 1 that he will not return to LMC. A week later, LMC announced that Berry would replace JHN.
Toyota	Legacy Motor Club	43	Erik Jones	Justin Alexander	Jones will return to LMC in 2027.
Toyota	Legacy Motor Club	84	Riley Herbst	Jeremy Bullins	LMC will add a third chartered car in 2027. Herbst was announced the driver on September 3. Bullins was announced to be the crew chief on September 23.

=== Full-time non-chartered teams ===
Manufacturer	Team	No.	Driver	Crew chief	Notes
Ford	RFK Racing	60	TBA	TBA	Preece moved from the No. 60 car to the No. 6 car.

=== Part-time non-chartered teams ===
Manufacturer	Team	No.	Driver	Crew chief	Races	References
Chevrolet	Spire Motorsports	TBA	Corey Day	TBA	TBA	
Ford	Garage 66	66	Josh Bilicki	TBA	1	
Ford	Garage 66	66	TBA	TBA	5	
Toyota	Legacy Motor Club	48	Jimmie Johnson	Chad Johnston	1	

=== Changes ===
==== Team changes ====
On January 16, 2026, Ford announced their Mustang Dark Horse SC will be debuted this season for all of its teams.

On September 29, 2026, Brad Keselowski announced that he will leave the RFK Racing ownership group.

On November 2, 2026, it was announced that Kaulig Racing would move from Chevrolet to Dodge in 2027, marking Dodge's return to the sport for the first time since 2012.

=== Driver changes ===
Following the death of Kyle Busch on May 21, 2026, Richard Childress Racing's No. 8, now renumbered to the No. 33, was left without a driver. Austin Hill would take his place for that weekend's Coca-Cola 600, as was announced just hours before his passing, and later the remainder of the season. Hill was announced to pilot the car in 2027 on August 24.

Riley Herbst would not return to 23XI Racing for 2027, with Corey Heim stepping up to fill his slot at the team. On September 3, 2026, it was confirmed Herbst would be driving for Legacy Motor Club in their newly opened third team.

Josh Berry would not return to Wood Brothers Racing for 2027, with Jesse Love stepping up to fill his slot at the team. Berry would move to LMC replacing John Hunter Nemechek.

Brad Keselowski announced on September 29, 2026, that he will be leaving RFK Racing as driver and owner in 2026. On November 4, 2026, it was confirmed that Ryan Preece would move from the No. 60 car to the No. 6 car to fill his slot.

==== Rookies ====
Jesse Love is the only expected rookie for 2027 so far, having signed a deal to race with Wood Brothers Racing in place of the outgoing Josh Berry. Austin Hill and Corey Heim will both be racing in their first full time Cup Series season in 2027, but will not be eligible for Rookie of the Year due to them both having already surpassed the 12 race limit.

== Rule changes ==
=== Technical changes ===
==== Horsepower ====
Beginning with the Coca-Cola 600 in May, all intermediate tracks will feature the 750-horsepower package. The NASCAR All-Star Race at North Wilkesboro Speedway will feature a special 800-horsepower package, with the option to keep said package permanently beginning with the Bass Pro Shops Night Race at Bristol Motor Speedway.

=== Policy changes ===
==== Superspeedway qualifying ====
Qualifying for superspeedway races at Daytona International Speedway, Atlanta Motor Speedway (EchoPark), and Talladega Superspeedway will feature one round of qualifying rather than two in previous years.

==== Inclement weather policy ====
Should a qualifying session get canceled due to inclement weather, owner's points will be used for deciding the starting lineup. The old "NASCAR Performance Metric" relied heavily on the previous race finish and will not be used for the Daytona 500.

== Schedule ==
The 2027 schedule was fully unveiled on August 26, 2026, and consists of 32 ovals, 3 road courses, and 1 street course, as well as 3 non-championship races to be held on ovals.

Notes: Race names and title sponsors are subject to change. Not all title sponsors/names of races have been announced for 2027. For the races where a 2027 name and title sponsor has yet to be announced, the title sponsors/names of those races in 2026 are listed.

Bolded races indicate an event generally known as a Crown Jewel race.

O Oval track
R Road course
S Street course

No	Race name	Track	Location	Date	TV	Radio
Regular Season
	Wheatley Vodka Clash	O Daytona International Speedway	Daytona Beach, Florida	February 13	FOX Sports	MRN
	The Duel at Daytona	O Daytona International Speedway	Daytona Beach, Florida	February 18	FOX Sports	MRN
1	**Daytona 500**	O Daytona International Speedway	Daytona Beach, Florida	February 21	FOX Sports	MRN
2	Autotrader 400	O EchoPark Speedway	Hampton, Georgia	February 28	FOX Sports	PRN
3	DuraMAX Grand Prix	R Circuit of the Americas	Austin, Texas	March 7	FOX Sports	PRN
4	Straight Talk Wireless 500	O Phoenix Raceway	Avondale, Arizona	March 14	FOX Sports	MRN
5	Pennzoil 400	O Las Vegas Motor Speedway	Las Vegas, Nevada	March 21	FOX Sports	PRN
6	Goodyear 400	O Darlington Raceway	Darlington, South Carolina	April 4	FOX Sports	MRN
7	Food City 500	O Bristol Motor Speedway	Bristol, Tennessee	April 11	FOX Sports	PRN
8	Cook Out 400	O Martinsville Speedway	Ridgeway, Virginia	April 18	FOX Sports	MRN
9	Jack Link's 500	O Talladega Superspeedway	Lincoln, Alabama	April 25	FOX Sports	MRN
10	Würth 400	O Texas Motor Speedway	Fort Worth, Texas	May 2	FOX Sports	PRN
11	AdventHealth 400	O Kansas Speedway	Kansas City, Kansas	May 9	FOX Sports	MRN
12	Ecosave 400	O Dover Motor Speedway	Dover, Delaware	May 16	FOX Sports	PRN
	NASCAR All-Star Race	O North Wilkesboro Speedway	North Wilkesboro, North Carolina	May 23	FOX Sports	MRN
13	**Coca-Cola 600**	O Charlotte Motor Speedway	Concord, North Carolina	May 30	Prime	PRN
14	Cracker Barrel 400	O Nashville Superspeedway	Lebanon, Tennessee	June 6	Prime	PRN
15	The Great American Getaway 400	O Pocono Raceway	Blakeslee, Pennsylvania	June 13	Prime	MRN
16	FireKeepers Casino 400	O Michigan International Speedway	Brooklyn, Michigan	June 20	Prime	MRN
17	eero 400	O Chicagoland Speedway	Joliet, Illinois	June 27	Prime	MRN
In-Season Challenge
18	Iowa Corn 350	O Iowa Speedway	Newton, Iowa	July 4	TNT	MRN
19	Toyota/Save Mart 350	R Sonoma Raceway	Sonoma, California	July 11	TNT	PRN
20	Dollar Tree 400	O EchoPark Speedway	Hampton, Georgia	July 18	TNT	PRN
21	**Brickyard 400**	O Indianapolis Motor Speedway	Speedway, Indiana	July 25	TNT	IMS
22	Anduril 250	S Coronado Street Course	San Diego, California	August 1	TNT	MRN
Regular Season
23	Bass Pro Shops Night Race	O Bristol Motor Speedway	Bristol, Tennessee	August 14	USA Sports	PRN
24	Enjoy Illinois 300	O World Wide Technology Raceway	Madison, Illinois	August 22	USA Sports	MRN
25	Coke Zero Sugar 400	O Daytona International Speedway	Daytona Beach, Florida	August 28	USA Sports	MRN
26	**Cook Out Southern 500**	O Darlington Raceway	Darlington, South Carolina	September 5	USA Sports	MRN
Cup Series Chase
27	Cook Out 400	O Richmond Raceway	Richmond, Virginia	September 11	USA Sports	MRN
28	Busch Light at The Glen	R Watkins Glen International	Watkins Glen, New York	September 19	USA Sports	MRN
29	Dollar Tree 301	O New Hampshire Motor Speedway	Loudon, New Hampshire	September 26	USA Sports	PRN
30	Hollywood Casino 400	O Kansas Speedway	Kansas City, Kansas	October 3	USA Sports	MRN
31	South Point 400	O Las Vegas Motor Speedway	Las Vegas, Nevada	October 10	USA Sports	PRN
32	Bank of America 400	O Charlotte Motor Speedway	Concord, North Carolina	October 17	USA Sports	PRN
33	Freeway Insurance 500	O Phoenix Raceway	Avondale, Arizona	October 24	USA Sports	MRN
34	YellaWood 500	O Talladega Superspeedway	Lincoln, Alabama	October 31	USA Sports	MRN
35	Xfinity 500	O Martinsville Speedway	Ridgeway, Virginia	November 7	USA Sports	MRN
36	Season Finale 400	O Homestead–Miami Speedway	Homestead, Florida	November 14	USA Sports	MRN

=== Schedule changes ===
The races at Richmond Raceway, Watkins Glen International and New Hampshire Motor Speedway return to "The Chase" for the first time since 2021, 2024 and 2025 respectively. The Wheatley Vodka Clash will return to Daytona International Speedway for the first time since 2020, replacing Bowman Gray Stadium. Bristol Motor Speedway's Bass Pro Shops Night Race returns to its traditional August weekend, after seven years in The Chase. The NASCAR All-Star Race returns to North Wilkesboro Speedway as it was from 2023 to 2025. Due to that change, Dover Motor Speedway regained its points race after a one year-hiatus.

== See also ==
- 2027 NASCAR O'Reilly Auto Parts Series
- 2027 NASCAR Truck Series
- 2027 ARCA Menards Series
- 2027 ARCA Menards Series East
- 2027 ARCA Menards Series West
- 2027 NASCAR Whelen Modified Tour
