= 2020 Season Finale 500 =

NASCAR Cup Series race

Race details
- Race 36 of 36 in the 2020 NASCAR Cup Series
- 2020 Season Finale 500 program cover
- Date: November 8, 2020
- Location: Phoenix Raceway in Avondale, Arizona
- Course: Permanent racing facility
- Course length: 1 miles (1.6 km)
- Distance: 312 laps, 312 mi (499.2 km)
- Average speed: 112.096 miles per hour (180.401 km/h)

Pole position
Driver	Chase Elliott	Hendrick Motorsports
- Grid positions set by competition-based formula

Most laps led
Driver	Chase Elliott	Hendrick Motorsports
- Laps: 154

Winner
No. 9	Chase Elliott	Hendrick Motorsports

Television in the United States
- Network: NBC
- Announcers: Rick Allen, Jeff Burton, Steve Letarte and Dale Earnhardt Jr.
- Nielsen ratings: 3.063 million

Radio in the United States
- Radio: MRN
- Booth announcers: Alex Hayden, Jeff Striegle and Rusty Wallace
- Turn announcers: Dave Moody (1 & 2) and Mike Bagley (3 & 4)

The 2020 Season Finale 500 was a NASCAR Cup Series race held on November 8, 2020 at Phoenix Raceway in Avondale, Arizona. Contested over 312 laps on the one mile (1.6 km) oval, it was the 36th and final race of the 2020 NASCAR Cup Series season. Chase Elliott won the race, claiming his first Cup Series championship.

The Season Finale 500 was the final full-time start for seven-time champion Jimmie Johnson, and for 2012 Cup runner-up Clint Bowyer, and 2003 Winston Cup champion Matt Kenseth as full-time Cup Series drivers.

== Report ==
=== Background ===
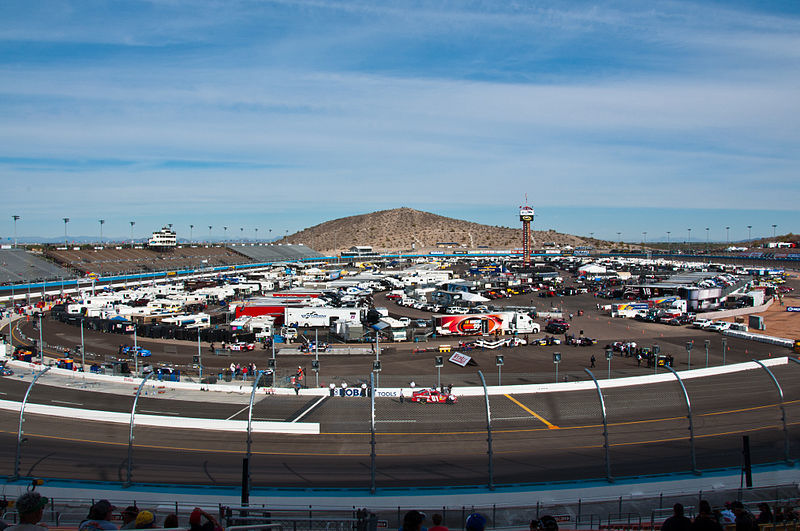
Phoenix Raceway, the track where the race was held.

Phoenix Raceway – also known as PIR – is a one-mile, low-banked tri-oval race track located in Avondale, Arizona. It is named after the nearby metropolitan area of Phoenix. The motorsport track opened in 1964 and currently hosts two NASCAR race weekends annually. PIR has also hosted the IndyCar Series, CART, USAC and the Rolex Sports Car Series. The raceway is currently owned and operated by International Speedway Corporation.

The raceway was originally constructed with a 2.5 mi (4.0 km) road course that ran both inside and outside of the main tri-oval. In 1991 the track was reconfigured with the current 1.51 mi (2.43 km) interior layout. PIR has an estimated grandstand seating capacity of around 67,000. Lights were installed around the track in 2004 following the addition of a second annual NASCAR race weekend.

Phoenix Raceway is home to two annual NASCAR race weekends, one of 13 facilities on the NASCAR schedule to host more than one race weekend a year. The track is both the first and last stop in the western United States, as well as the fourth and the last track on the schedule.

This was the first time the championship race was held in Phoenix.

==== Championship drivers ====
Joey Logano was the first of the four drivers to clinch a spot in the Championship 4, winning the first race of the Round of 8 at Kansas.

Chase Elliott clinched the second spot in the Championship 4, winning the final race of the Round of 8 at Martinsville.

Brad Keselowski clinched the third spot in the Championship 4 based on points.

Denny Hamlin clinched the final spot in the Championship 4 based on points.

==== Entry list ====
- (R) denotes rookie driver.
- (i) denotes driver who are ineligible for series driver points.
- (CC) denotes championship contender

No.	Driver	Team	Manufacturer
00	Quin Houff (R)	StarCom Racing	Chevrolet
1	Kurt Busch	Chip Ganassi Racing	Chevrolet
2	Brad Keselowski (CC)	Team Penske	Ford
3	Austin Dillon	Richard Childress Racing	Chevrolet
4	Kevin Harvick	Stewart-Haas Racing	Ford
6	Ryan Newman	Roush Fenway Racing	Ford
7	Garrett Smithley (i)	Tommy Baldwin Racing	Chevrolet
8	Tyler Reddick (R)	Richard Childress Racing	Chevrolet
9	Chase Elliott (CC)	Hendrick Motorsports	Chevrolet
10	Aric Almirola	Stewart-Haas Racing	Ford
11	Denny Hamlin (CC)	Joe Gibbs Racing	Toyota
12	Ryan Blaney	Team Penske	Ford
13	Ty Dillon	Germain Racing	Chevrolet
14	Clint Bowyer	Stewart-Haas Racing	Ford
15	Brennan Poole (R)	Premium Motorsports	Chevrolet
17	Chris Buescher	Roush Fenway Racing	Ford
18	Kyle Busch	Joe Gibbs Racing	Toyota
19	Martin Truex Jr.	Joe Gibbs Racing	Toyota
20	Erik Jones	Joe Gibbs Racing	Toyota
21	Matt DiBenedetto	Wood Brothers Racing	Ford
22	Joey Logano (CC)	Team Penske	Ford
24	William Byron	Hendrick Motorsports	Chevrolet
27	J. J. Yeley (i)	Rick Ware Racing	Chevrolet
32	Corey LaJoie	Go Fas Racing	Ford
34	Michael McDowell	Front Row Motorsports	Ford
37	Ryan Preece	JTG Daugherty Racing	Chevrolet
38	John Hunter Nemechek (R)	Front Row Motorsports	Ford
41	Cole Custer (R)	Stewart-Haas Racing	Ford
42	Matt Kenseth	Chip Ganassi Racing	Chevrolet
43	Bubba Wallace	Richard Petty Motorsports	Chevrolet
47	Ricky Stenhouse Jr.	JTG Daugherty Racing	Chevrolet
48	Jimmie Johnson	Hendrick Motorsports	Chevrolet
51	Joey Gase (i)	Petty Ware Racing	Ford
53	James Davison	Rick Ware Racing	Ford
66	Timmy Hill (i)	MBM Motorsports	Toyota
77	Josh Bilicki (i)	Spire Motorsports	Chevrolet
88	Alex Bowman	Hendrick Motorsports	Chevrolet
95	Christopher Bell (R)	Leavine Family Racing	Toyota
96	Daniel Suárez	Gaunt Brothers Racing	Toyota
Official entry list

== Qualifying ==
Chase Elliott was awarded the pole for the race as determined by competition-based formula. However he was sent to the rear of the field as a result of failing pre-race inspection multiple times.

=== Starting Lineup ===
Pos	No.	Driver	Team	Manufacturer
1	9	Chase Elliott (CC)	Hendrick Motorsports	Chevrolet
2	22	Joey Logano (CC)	Team Penske	Ford
3	2	Brad Keselowski (CC)	Team Penske	Ford
4	11	Denny Hamlin (CC)	Joe Gibbs Racing	Toyota
5	12	Ryan Blaney	Team Penske	Ford
6	88	Alex Bowman	Hendrick Motorsports	Chevrolet
7	1	Kurt Busch	Chip Ganassi Racing	Chevrolet
8	18	Kyle Busch	Joe Gibbs Racing	Toyota
9	14	Clint Bowyer	Stewart-Haas Racing	Ford
10	10	Aric Almirola	Stewart-Haas Racing	Ford
11	4	Kevin Harvick	Stewart-Haas Racing	Ford
12	21	Matt DiBenedetto	Wood Brothers Racing	Ford
13	19	Martin Truex Jr.	Joe Gibbs Racing	Toyota
14	20	Erik Jones	Joe Gibbs Racing	Toyota
15	41	Cole Custer (R)	Stewart-Haas Racing	Ford
16	42	Matt Kenseth	Chip Ganassi Racing	Chevrolet
17	95	Christopher Bell (R)	Leavine Family Racing	Toyota
18	3	Austin Dillon	Richard Childress Racing	Chevrolet
19	6	Ryan Newman	Roush Fenway Racing	Ford
20	47	Ricky Stenhouse Jr.	JTG Daugherty Racing	Chevrolet
21	8	Tyler Reddick (R)	Richard Childress Racing	Chevrolet
22	13	Ty Dillon	Germain Racing	Chevrolet
23	43	Bubba Wallace	Richard Petty Motorsports	Chevrolet
24	37	Ryan Preece	JTG Daugherty Racing	Chevrolet
25	24	William Byron	Hendrick Motorsports	Chevrolet
26	48	Jimmie Johnson	Hendrick Motorsports	Chevrolet
27	38	John Hunter Nemechek (R)	Front Row Motorsports	Ford
28	32	Corey LaJoie	Go Fas Racing	Ford
29	34	Michael McDowell	Front Row Motorsports	Ford
30	96	Daniel Suárez	Gaunt Brothers Racing	Toyota
31	17	Chris Buescher	Roush Fenway Racing	Ford
32	27	J. J. Yeley (i)	Rick Ware Racing	Chevrolet
33	66	Timmy Hill (i)	MBM Motorsports	Toyota
34	00	Quin Houff (R)	StarCom Racing	Chevrolet
35	15	Brennan Poole (R)	Premium Motorsports	Chevrolet
36	53	James Davison	Rick Ware Racing	Ford
37	51	Joey Gase (i)	Petty Ware Racing	Ford
38	77	Josh Bilicki (i)	Spire Motorsports	Chevrolet
39	7	Garrett Smithley (i)	Tommy Baldwin Racing	Chevrolet
Official starting lineup

== Race ==
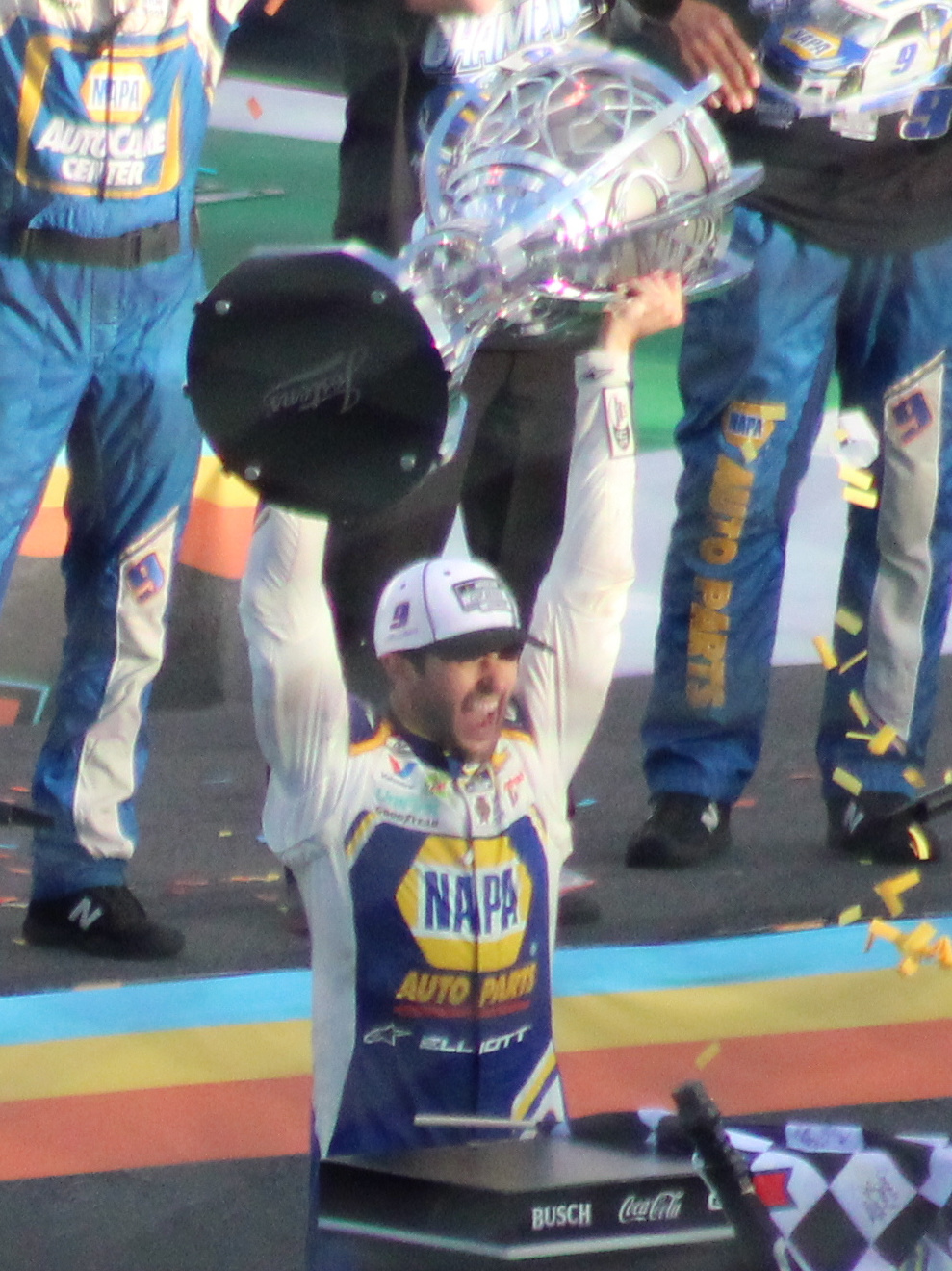
Chase Elliott won the race and his first Cup Series championship title.

- Note: Chase Elliott, Brad Keselowski, Joey Logano, and Denny Hamlin were not eligible for stage points because of their participation in the Championship 4.

=== Stage Results ===
Stage One Laps: 75

Pos	No	Driver	Team	Manufacturer	Points
1	22	Joey Logano (CC)	Team Penske	Ford	0
2	11	Denny Hamlin (CC)	Joe Gibbs Racing	Toyota	0
3	9	Chase Elliott (CC)	Hendrick Motorsports	Chevrolet	0
4	2	Brad Keselowski (CC)	Team Penske	Ford	0
5	12	Ryan Blaney	Team Penske	Ford	6
6	18	Kyle Busch	Joe Gibbs Racing	Toyota	5
7	88	Alex Bowman	Hendrick Motorsports	Chevrolet	4
8	14	Clint Bowyer	Stewart-Haas Racing	Ford	3
9	1	Kurt Busch	Chip Ganassi Racing	Chevrolet	2
10	21	Matt DiBenedetto	Wood Brothers Racing	Ford	1
Official stage one results

Stage Two Laps: 115

Pos	No	Driver	Team	Manufacturer	Points
1	2	Brad Keselowski (CC)	Team Penske	Ford	0
2	9	Chase Elliott (CC)	Hendrick Motorsports	Chevrolet	0
3	22	Joey Logano (CC)	Team Penske	Ford	0
4	11	Denny Hamlin (CC)	Joe Gibbs Racing	Toyota	0
5	12	Ryan Blaney	Team Penske	Ford	6
6	48	Jimmie Johnson	Hendrick Motorsports	Chevrolet	5
7	1	Kurt Busch	Chip Ganassi Racing	Chevrolet	4
8	18	Kyle Busch	Joe Gibbs Racing	Toyota	3
9	21	Matt DiBenedetto	Wood Brothers Racing	Ford	2
10	24	William Byron	Hendrick Motorsports	Chevrolet	1
Official stage two results

=== Final Stage Results ===
Stage Three Laps: 122

Pos	Grid	No	Driver	Team	Manufacturer	Laps	Points
1	1	9	Chase Elliott (CC)	Hendrick Motorsports	Chevrolet	312	40
2	3	2	Brad Keselowski (CC)	Team Penske	Ford	312	35
3	2	22	Joey Logano (CC)	Team Penske	Ford	312	34
4	4	11	Denny Hamlin (CC)	Joe Gibbs Racing	Toyota	312	33
5	26	48	Jimmie Johnson	Hendrick Motorsports	Chevrolet	312	37
6	5	12	Ryan Blaney	Team Penske	Ford	312	43
7	11	4	Kevin Harvick	Stewart-Haas Racing	Ford	312	30
8	12	21	Matt DiBenedetto	Wood Brothers Racing	Ford	312	32
9	25	24	William Byron	Hendrick Motorsports	Chevrolet	312	29
10	13	19	Martin Truex Jr.	Joe Gibbs Racing	Toyota	312	27
11	8	18	Kyle Busch	Joe Gibbs Racing	Toyota	312	34
12	7	1	Kurt Busch	Chip Ganassi Racing	Chevrolet	312	30
13	10	10	Aric Almirola	Stewart-Haas Racing	Ford	311	24
14	9	14	Clint Bowyer	Stewart-Haas Racing	Ford	311	26
15	23	43	Bubba Wallace	Richard Petty Motorsports	Chevrolet	311	22
16	6	88	Alex Bowman	Hendrick Motorsports	Chevrolet	311	25
17	17	95	Christopher Bell (R)	Leavine Family Racing	Toyota	311	20
18	18	3	Austin Dillon	Richard Childress Racing	Chevrolet	311	19
19	21	8	Tyler Reddick (R)	Richard Childress Racing	Chevrolet	311	18
20	31	17	Chris Buescher	Roush Fenway Racing	Ford	311	17
21	22	13	Ty Dillon	Germain Racing	Chevrolet	311	16
22	14	20	Erik Jones	Joe Gibbs Racing	Toyota	311	15
23	29	34	Michael McDowell	Front Row Motorsports	Ford	311	14
24	19	6	Ryan Newman	Roush Fenway Racing	Ford	311	13
25	16	42	Matt Kenseth	Chip Ganassi Racing	Chevrolet	311	12
26	27	38	John Hunter Nemechek (R)	Front Row Motorsports	Ford	311	11
27	20	47	Ricky Stenhouse Jr.	JTG Daugherty Racing	Chevrolet	310	10
28	15	41	Cole Custer (R)	Stewart-Haas Racing	Ford	310	9
29	35	15	Brennan Poole (R)	Premium Motorsports	Chevrolet	309	8
30	32	27	J. J. Yeley (i)	Rick Ware Racing	Chevrolet	306	0
31	30	96	Daniel Suárez	Gaunt Brothers Racing	Toyota	306	6
32	37	51	Joey Gase (i)	Petty Ware Racing	Ford	302	0
33	36	53	James Davison	Rick Ware Racing	Ford	302	4
34	24	37	Ryan Preece	JTG Daugherty Racing	Chevrolet	299	3
35	38	77	Josh Bilicki (i)	Spire Motorsports	Chevrolet	296	0
36	33	66	Timmy Hill (i)	MBM Motorsports	Toyota	288	0
37	39	7	Garrett Smithley (i)	Tommy Baldwin Racing	Chevrolet	261	0
38	28	32	Corey LaJoie	Go Fas Racing	Ford	215	1
39	34	00	Quin Houff (R)	StarCom Racing	Chevrolet	149	1
Official race results

=== Race statistics ===
- Lead changes: 19 among 9 different drivers
- Cautions/Laps: 4 for 27
- Red flags: 0
- Time of race: 2 hours, 47 minutes and 0 seconds
- Average speed: 112.096 miles per hour (180.401 km/h)

== Media ==
=== Television ===
NBC Sports covered the race on the television side. Rick Allen, two–time Phoenix winner Jeff Burton, Steve Letarte, and three-time Phoenix winner Dale Earnhardt Jr. called the action from the booth. Dave Burns, Parker Kligerman, Marty Snider, and Kelli Stavast handled the pit road duties, and Rutledge Wood handled the features from his home during the race.

NBC
Booth announcers	Pit reporters	Features reporter
Lap-by-lap: Rick Allen; Color-commentator: Jeff Burton; Color-commentator: Steve Letarte; Color-commentator: Dale Earnhardt Jr.	Dave Burns; Parker Kligerman; Marty Snider; Kelli Stavast	Rutledge Wood

=== Radio ===
MRN covered the radio call for the race, which was simulcast on Sirius XM NASCAR Radio. Alex Hayden, Jeff Striegle, and Rusty Wallace called the action from the broadcast booth when the field raced down the front straightaway. Dave Moody called the action from turns 1 & 2 and Mike Bagley called the action from turns 3 & 4. Winston Kelley and Steve Post covered the action for MRN from pit lane.

MRN
Booth announcers	Turn announcers	Pit reporters
Lead announcer: Alex Hayden; Announcer: Jeff Striegle; Announcer: Rusty Wallace	Turns 1 & 2: Dave Moody; Turns 3 & 4: Mike Bagley	Winston Kelley; Steve Post

== Standings after the race ==
Drivers' Championship standings

	Pos	Driver	Points
1	1	Chase Elliott	5,040
1	2	Brad Keselowski	5,035 (–5)
2	3	Joey Logano	5,034 (–6)
	4	Denny Hamlin	5,033 (–7)
	5	Kevin Harvick	2,410 (–2,630)
	6	Alex Bowman	2,371 (–2,669)
	7	Martin Truex Jr.	2,341 (–2,699)
	8	Kyle Busch	2,341 (–2,699)
	9	Ryan Blaney	2,336 (–2,704)
1	10	Kurt Busch	2,287 (–2,753)
1	11	Austin Dillon	2,277 (–2,763)
	12	Clint Bowyer	2,254 (–2,786)
1	13	Matt DiBenedetto	2,249 (–2,791)
1	14	William Byron	2,247 (–2,793)
	15	Aric Almirola	2,235 (–2,805)
	16	Cole Custer	2,202 (–2,838)
Official driver's standings

Manufacturers' Championship standings

Pos	Manufacturer	Points
1	Ford	1,329
2	Toyota	1,258 (–71)
3	Chevrolet	1,232 (–97)

- Note: Only the first 16 positions are included for the driver standings.

Previous race: 2020 Xfinity 500	NASCAR Cup Series; 2020 season	Next race: 2021 Daytona 500
