= 2022 Folds of Honor QuikTrip 500 =

NASCAR Cup Series race

Race details
- Race 5 of 36 in the 2022 NASCAR Cup Series
- Date: March 20, 2022
- Location: Atlanta Motor Speedway in Hampton, Georgia
- Course: Permanent racing facility
- Course length: 1.54 miles (2.48 km)
- Distance: 325 laps, 500.5 mi (806 km)
- Average speed: 126.584 miles per hour (203.717 km/h)

Pole position
Driver	Chase Briscoe	Stewart-Haas Racing
- Time: 2.850 Score (Pandemic formula)

Most laps led
Driver	William Byron	Hendrick Motorsports
- Laps: 111

Winner
No. 24	William Byron	Hendrick Motorsports

Television in the United States
- Network: Fox
- Announcers: Mike Joy, Clint Bowyer, and Jeff Gordon
- Nielsen ratings: 2.36, 4.003 Million Viewers

Radio in the United States
- Radio: PRN
- Booth announcers: Doug Rice and Mark Garrow
- Turn announcers: Rob Albright (1 & 2) and Pat Patterson (3 & 4)

The 2022 Folds of Honor QuikTrip 500 was a NASCAR Cup Series race held on March 20, 2022 at Atlanta Motor Speedway in Hampton, Georgia. Contested over 325 laps on the 1.54-mile-long (2.48 km) asphalt quad-oval intermediate speedway, it was the fifth race of the 2022 NASCAR Cup Series season. It was the first race at Atlanta to use superspeedway rules (in line with the traditional restrictor plate tracks with a reduced horsepower package and track limits rules), with the new reconfiguration increasing the banking from 24 degrees to 28 degrees and new pavement.

== Report ==
=== Background ===
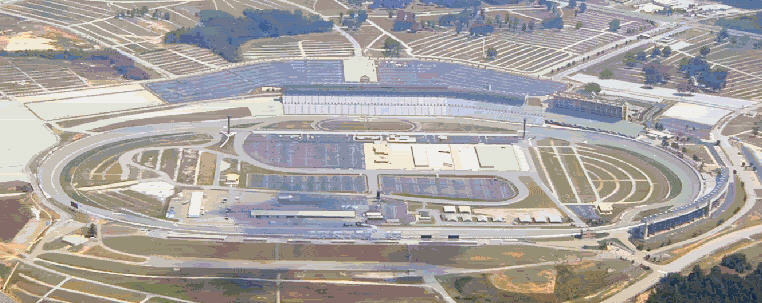
Atlanta Motor Speedway, the track where the race was held.

Atlanta Motor Speedway (formerly Atlanta International Raceway) is a track in Hampton, Georgia, 20 miles (32 km) south of Atlanta. It is a 1.54-mile (2.48 km) quad-oval track with a seating capacity of 111,000. It opened in 1960 as a 1.5-mile (2.4 km) standard oval. In 1994, 46 condominiums were built over the northeastern side of the track. In 1997, to standardize the track with Speedway Motorsports' other two 1.5-mile (2.4 km) ovals, the entire track was almost completely rebuilt. The front stretch and back stretch were swapped, and the configuration of the track was changed from oval to quad-oval. The project made the track one of the fastest on the NASCAR circuit.

==== Entry list ====
- (R) denotes rookie driver.
- (i) denotes driver who is ineligible for series driver points.

No.	Driver	Team	Manufacturer
1	Ross Chastain	Trackhouse Racing Team	Chevrolet
2	Austin Cindric (R)	Team Penske	Ford
3	Austin Dillon	Richard Childress Racing	Chevrolet
4	Kevin Harvick	Stewart-Haas Racing	Ford
5	Kyle Larson	Hendrick Motorsports	Chevrolet
6	Brad Keselowski	RFK Racing	Ford
7	Corey LaJoie	Spire Motorsports	Chevrolet
8	Tyler Reddick	Richard Childress Racing	Chevrolet
9	Chase Elliott	Hendrick Motorsports	Chevrolet
10	Aric Almirola	Stewart-Haas Racing	Ford
11	Denny Hamlin	Joe Gibbs Racing	Toyota
12	Ryan Blaney	Team Penske	Ford
14	Chase Briscoe	Stewart-Haas Racing	Ford
15	David Ragan	Rick Ware Racing	Ford
16	Noah Gragson (i)	Kaulig Racing	Chevrolet
17	Chris Buescher	RFK Racing	Ford
18	Kyle Busch	Joe Gibbs Racing	Toyota
19	Martin Truex Jr.	Joe Gibbs Racing	Toyota
20	Christopher Bell	Joe Gibbs Racing	Toyota
21	Harrison Burton (R)	Wood Brothers Racing	Ford
22	Joey Logano	Team Penske	Ford
23	Bubba Wallace	23XI Racing	Toyota
24	William Byron	Hendrick Motorsports	Chevrolet
31	Justin Haley	Kaulig Racing	Chevrolet
34	Michael McDowell	Front Row Motorsports	Ford
38	Todd Gilliland (R)	Front Row Motorsports	Ford
41	Cole Custer	Stewart-Haas Racing	Ford
42	Ty Dillon	Petty GMS Motorsports	Chevrolet
43	Erik Jones	Petty GMS Motorsports	Chevrolet
44	Greg Biffle	NY Racing Team	Chevrolet
45	Kurt Busch	23XI Racing	Toyota
47	Ricky Stenhouse Jr.	JTG Daugherty Racing	Chevrolet
48	Alex Bowman	Hendrick Motorsports	Chevrolet
51	Cody Ware	Rick Ware Racing	Ford
77	Josh Bilicki (i)	Spire Motorsports	Chevrolet
78	B. J. McLeod	Live Fast Motorsports	Ford
99	Daniel Suárez	Trackhouse Racing Team	Chevrolet
Official entry list

== Practice ==
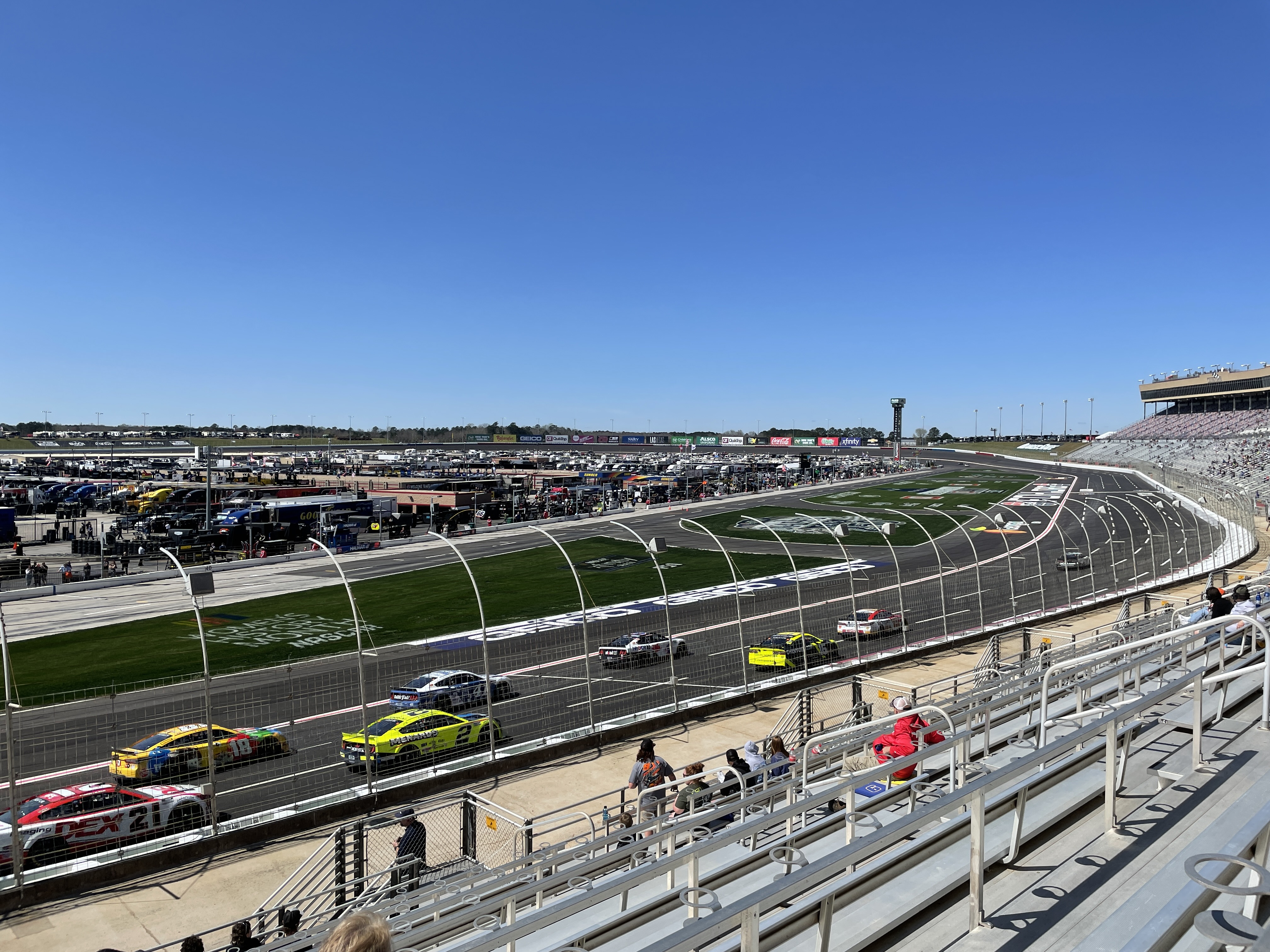
Practice for the race

Friday's practice session was canceled due to inclement weather. Practice replaced qualifying Saturday. Ricky Stenhouse Jr. was the fastest in the practice session with a time of 29.708 seconds and a speed of 186.616 mph (300.329 km/h).

=== Practice results ===
Pos	No.	Driver	Team	Manufacturer	Time	Speed
1	47	Ricky Stenhouse Jr.	JTG Daugherty Racing	Chevrolet	29.708	186.616
2	18	Kyle Busch	Joe Gibbs Racing	Toyota	29.744	186.391
3	20	Christopher Bell	Joe Gibbs Racing	Toyota	29.755	186.322
Official practice results

== Qualifying ==
Qualifying was cancelled because of a need to add additional practice to the reconfigured circuit. Chase Briscoe was awarded the pole for the race as a result of the pandemic formula with a score of 2.850.

=== Starting Lineup ===
Pos	No.	Driver	Team	Manufacturer
1	14	Chase Briscoe	Stewart-Haas Racing	Ford
2	12	Ryan Blaney	Team Penske	Ford
3	22	Joey Logano	Team Penske	Ford
4	18	Kyle Busch	Joe Gibbs Racing	Toyota
5	8	Tyler Reddick	Richard Childress Racing	Chevrolet
6	9	Chase Elliott	Hendrick Motorsports	Chevrolet
7	1	Ross Chastain	Trackhouse Racing Team	Chevrolet
8	4	Kevin Harvick	Stewart-Haas Racing	Ford
9	45	Kurt Busch	23XI Racing	Toyota
10	10	Aric Almirola	Stewart-Haas Racing	Ford
11	48	Alex Bowman	Hendrick Motorsports	Chevrolet
12	24	William Byron	Hendrick Motorsports	Chevrolet
13	99	Daniel Suárez	Trackhouse Racing Team	Chevrolet
14	17	Chris Buescher	RFK Racing	Ford
15	11	Denny Hamlin	Joe Gibbs Racing	Toyota
16	2	Austin Cindric (R)	Team Penske	Ford
17	3	Austin Dillon	Richard Childress Racing	Chevrolet
18	42	Ty Dillon	Petty GMS Motorsports	Chevrolet
19	23	Bubba Wallace	23XI Racing	Toyota
20	41	Cole Custer	Stewart-Haas Racing	Ford
21	5	Kyle Larson	Hendrick Motorsports	Chevrolet
22	31	Justin Haley	Kaulig Racing	Chevrolet
23	43	Erik Jones	Petty GMS Motorsports	Chevrolet
24	6	Brad Keselowski	RFK Racing	Ford
25	38	Todd Gilliland (R)	Front Row Motorsports	Ford
26	19	Martin Truex Jr.	Joe Gibbs Racing	Toyota
27	20	Christopher Bell	Joe Gibbs Racing	Toyota
28	47	Ricky Stenhouse Jr.	JTG Daugherty Racing	Chevrolet
29	34	Michael McDowell	Front Row Motorsports	Ford
30	16	Noah Gragson (i)	Kaulig Racing	Chevrolet
31	21	Harrison Burton (R)	Wood Brothers Racing	Ford
32	51	Cody Ware	Rick Ware Racing	Ford
33	7	Corey LaJoie	Spire Motorsports	Chevrolet
34	78	B. J. McLeod	Live Fast Motorsports	Ford
35	15	David Ragan	Rick Ware Racing	Ford
36	77	Josh Bilicki (i)	Spire Motorsports	Chevrolet
37	44	Greg Biffle	NY Racing Team	Chevrolet
Official starting lineup

== Race ==
=== Stage Results ===
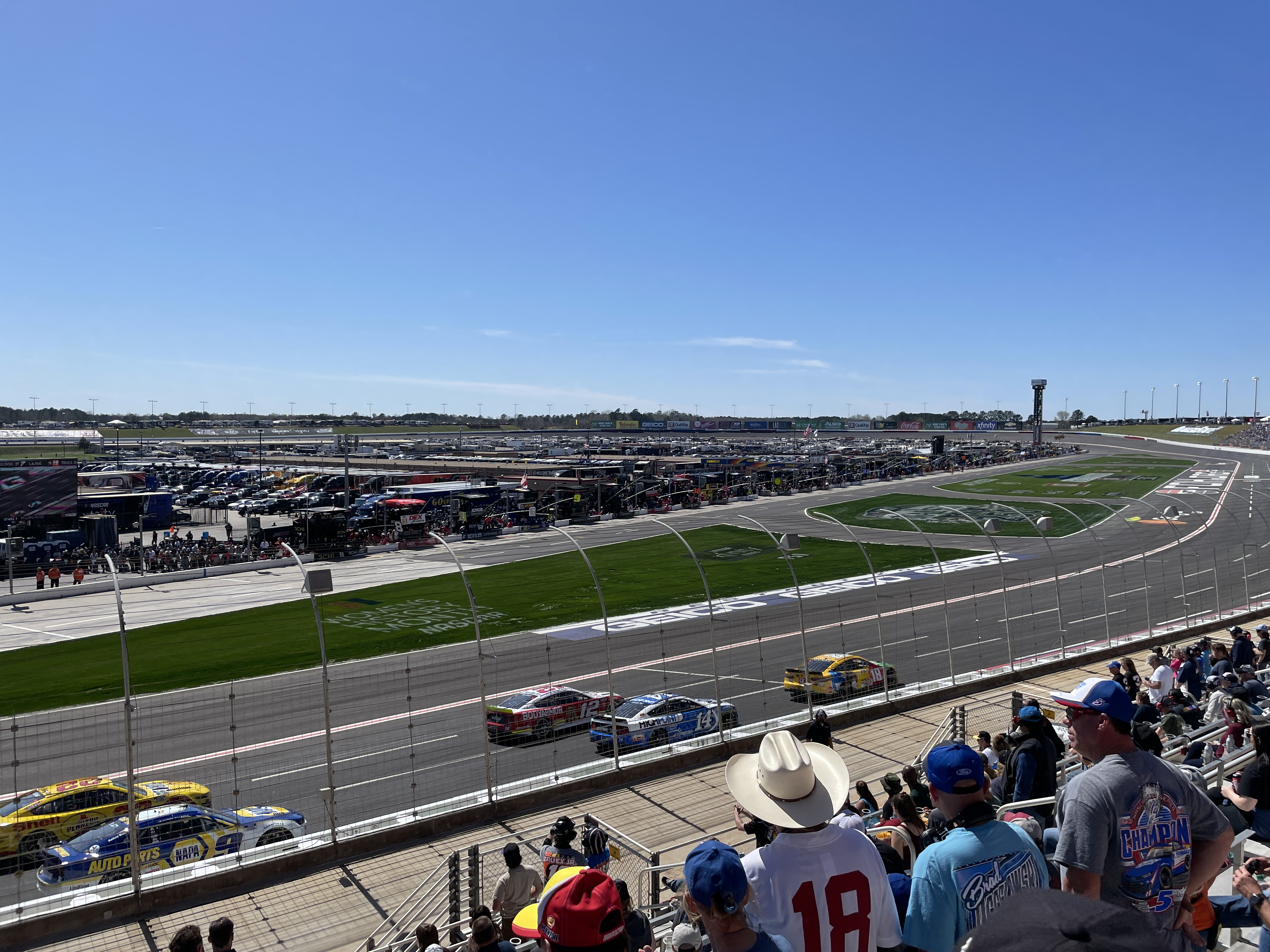
Kyle Busch leads during the first stage of the race

Stage One Laps: 105

Pos	No	Driver	Team	Manufacturer	Points
1	24	William Byron	Hendrick Motorsports	Chevrolet	10
2	11	Denny Hamlin	Joe Gibbs Racing	Toyota	9
3	99	Daniel Suárez	Trackhouse Racing Team	Chevrolet	8
4	47	Ricky Stenhouse Jr.	JTG Daugherty Racing	Chevrolet	7
5	43	Erik Jones	Petty GMS Motorsports	Chevrolet	6
6	45	Kurt Busch	23XI Racing	Toyota	5
7	48	Alex Bowman	Hendrick Motorsports	Chevrolet	4
8	5	Kyle Larson	Hendrick Motorsports	Chevrolet	3
9	8	Tyler Reddick	Richard Childress Racing	Chevrolet	2
10	2	Austin Cindric (R)	Team Penske	Ford	1
Official stage one results

Stage Two Laps: 105

Pos	No	Driver	Team	Manufacturer	Points
1	12	Ryan Blaney	Team Penske	Ford	10
2	9	Chase Elliott	Hendrick Motorsports	Chevrolet	9
3	14	Chase Briscoe	Stewart-Haas Racing	Ford	8
4	10	Aric Almirola	Stewart-Haas Racing	Ford	7
5	6	Brad Keselowski	RFK Racing	Ford	6
6	99	Daniel Suárez	Trackhouse Racing Team	Chevrolet	5
7	19	Martin Truex Jr.	Joe Gibbs Racing	Toyota	4
8	23	Bubba Wallace	23XI Racing	Toyota	3
9	24	William Byron	Hendrick Motorsports	Chevrolet	2
10	1	Ross Chastain	Trackhouse Racing Team	Chevrolet	1
Official stage two results

=== Final Stage Results ===
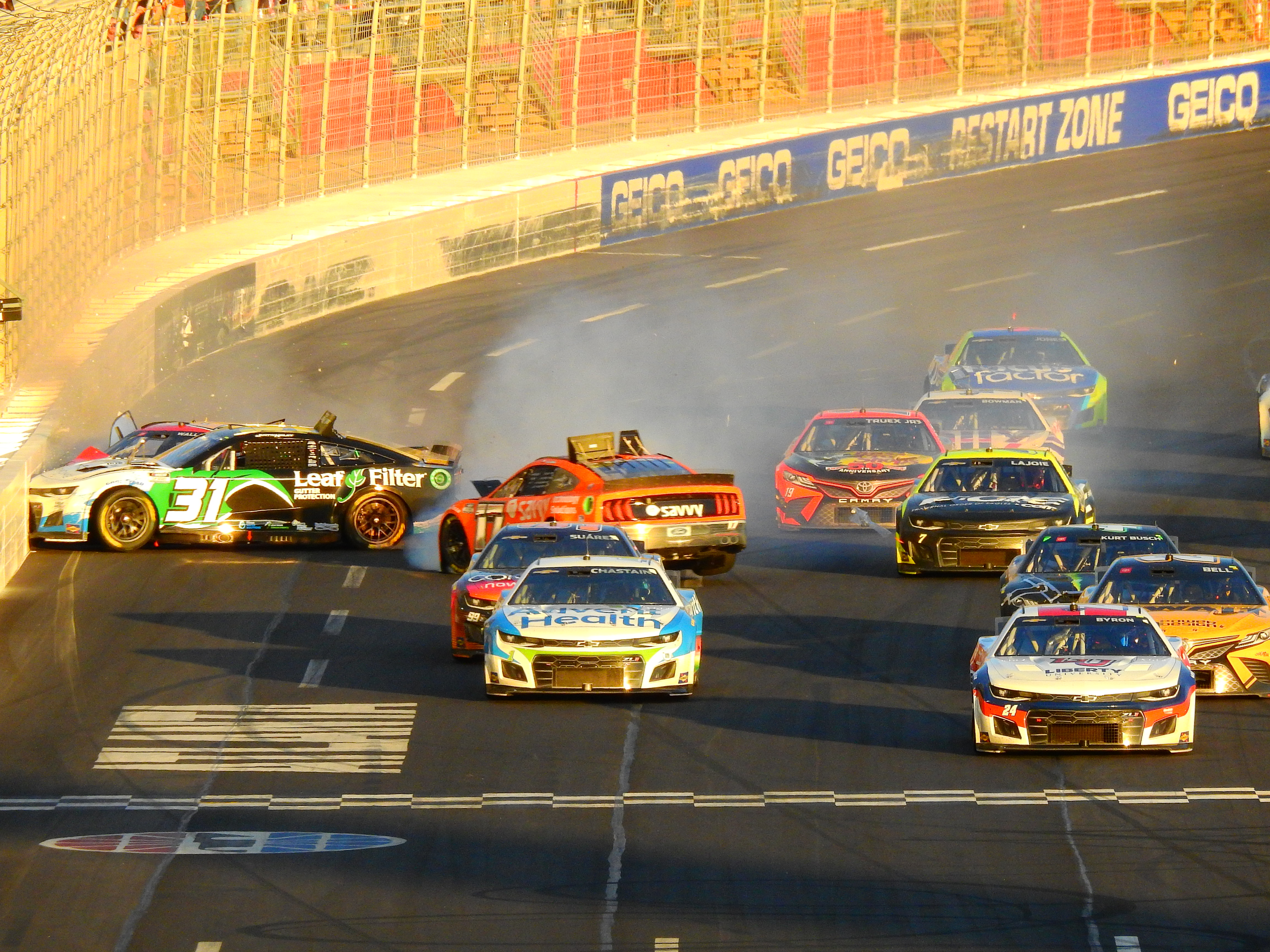
Frontal shot of the finish of the race from Turn 1, showing William Byron winning the race, as well as the last lap crash involving Bubba Wallace, Justin Haley, and Chris Buescher.

Stage Three Laps: 115

Pos	Grid	No	Driver	Team	Manufacturer	Laps	Points
1	12	24	William Byron	Hendrick Motorsports	Chevrolet	325	52
2	7	1	Ross Chastain	Trackhouse Racing Team	Chevrolet	325	36
3	9	45	Kurt Busch	23XI Racing	Toyota	325	39
4	13	99	Daniel Suárez	Trackhouse Racing Team	Chevrolet	325	46
5	33	7	Corey LaJoie	Spire Motorsports	Chevrolet	325	32
6	6	9	Chase Elliott	Hendrick Motorsports	Chevrolet	325	40
7	14	17	Chris Buescher	RFK Racing	Ford	325	30
8	26	19	Martin Truex Jr.	Joe Gibbs Racing	Toyota	325	33
9	3	22	Joey Logano	Team Penske	Ford	325	28
10	11	48	Alex Bowman	Hendrick Motorsports	Chevrolet	325	31
11	22	31	Justin Haley	Kaulig Racing	Chevrolet	325	26
12	24	6	Brad Keselowski (Note: Keselowski was docked 100 points after NASCAR discovered illegal modifications to his car during the R&D Center inspection.)	RFK Racing	Ford	325	-69
13	19	23	Bubba Wallace	23XI Racing	Toyota	325	27
14	23	43	Erik Jones	Petty GMS Motorsports	Chevrolet	325	29
15	1	14	Chase Briscoe	Stewart-Haas Racing	Ford	325	30
16	36	77	Josh Bilicki (i)	Spire Motorsports	Chevrolet	325	0
17	2	12	Ryan Blaney	Team Penske	Ford	325	30
18	35	15	David Ragan	Rick Ware Racing	Ford	325	19
19	34	78	B. J. McLeod	Live Fast Motorsports	Ford	325	18
20	37	44	Greg Biffle	NY Racing Team	Chevrolet	325	17
21	8	4	Kevin Harvick	Stewart-Haas Racing	Ford	325	16
22	10	10	Aric Almirola	Stewart-Haas Racing	Ford	325	22
23	27	20	Christopher Bell (Note: Bell was penalized to last car on lap for exceeding track limits on Lap 325.)	Joe Gibbs Racing	Toyota	325	14
24	29	34	Michael McDowell	Front Row Motorsports	Ford	321	13
25	31	21	Harrison Burton (R)	Wood Brothers Racing	Ford	321	12
26	32	51	Cody Ware	Rick Ware Racing	Ford	300	11
27	25	38	Todd Gilliland (R)	Front Row Motorsports	Ford	297	10
28	5	8	Tyler Reddick	Richard Childress Racing	Chevrolet	245	11
29	15	11	Denny Hamlin	Joe Gibbs Racing	Toyota	212	17
30	21	5	Kyle Larson	Hendrick Motorsports	Chevrolet	212	10
31	28	47	Ricky Stenhouse Jr.	JTG Daugherty Racing	Chevrolet	200	13
32	16	2	Austin Cindric (R)	Team Penske	Ford	200	6
33	4	18	Kyle Busch	Joe Gibbs Racing	Toyota	171	4
34	20	41	Cole Custer	Stewart-Haas Racing	Ford	150	3
35	17	3	Austin Dillon	Richard Childress Racing	Chevrolet	101	2
36	18	42	Ty Dillon	Petty GMS Motorsports	Chevrolet	101	1
37	30	16	Noah Gragson (i)	Kaulig Racing	Chevrolet	23	0
Official race results

=== Race statistics ===
- Lead changes: 46 among 20 different drivers
- Cautions/Laps: 11 for 65
- Red flags: 0
- Time of race: 3 hours, 57 minutes and 14 seconds
- Average speed: 126.584 miles per hour (203.717 km/h)

== Post-race ==
Brad Keselowski, who finished 12th, was penalized 100 playoff points when an illegally modified body part was found on his car during a post-race inspection. In addition, Matt McCall, his crew chief, was fined $100,000 and suspended for the next four races. The penalty dropped Keselowski from 6th in the point standings to 35th.

== Media ==
=== Television ===
The Folds of Honor QuikTrip 500 was carried by Fox in the United States. Mike Joy, Clint Bowyer, and five-time Atlanta winner Jeff Gordon called the race from the broadcast booth. Jamie Little and Regan Smith handled pit road for the television side, and Larry McReynolds provided insight from the Fox Sports studio in Charlotte.

Fox
Booth announcers	Pit reporters	In-race analyst
Lap-by-lap: Mike Joy; Color-commentator: Jeff Gordon; Color-commentator: Clint Bowyer	Jamie Little; Regan Smith	Larry McReynolds

=== Radio ===
The race was broadcast on radio by the Performance Racing Network and simulcast on Sirius XM NASCAR Radio. Doug Rice and Mark Garrow called the race from the booth when the field raced down the front stretch. Rob Albright called the race from atop a billboard outside of turn 2 when the field raced through turns 1 and 2, and Pat Patterson called the race from a billboard outside of turn 3 when the field raced through turns 3 and 4. On pit road, PRN was manned by Brad Gillie, Doug Turnbull, and Wendy Venturini.

PRN
Booth announcers	Turn announcers	Pit reporters
Lead announcer: Doug Rice; Announcer: Mark Garrow	Turns 1 & 2: Rob Albright; Turns 3 & 4: Pat Patterson	Brad Gillie; Doug Turnbull; Wendy Venturini

== Standings after the race ==
Drivers' Championship standings

	Pos	Driver	Points
2	1	Chase Elliott	171
1	2	Joey Logano	164 (–7)
2	3	Chase Briscoe	156 (–15)
11	4	William Byron	150 (–21)
7	5	Kurt Busch	148 (–23)
1	6	Ryan Blaney	148 (–23)
1	7	Aric Almirola	144 (–27)
5	8	Martin Truex Jr.	142 (–29)
2	9	Alex Bowman	140 (–31)
4	10	Ross Chastain	137 (–34)
9	11	Kyle Busch	136 (–35)
8	12	Kyle Larson	135 (–36)
9	13	Daniel Suárez	127 (–44)
4	14	Kevin Harvick	127 (–44)
6	15	Tyler Reddick	126 (–45)
8	16	Austin Cindric	121 (–50)
Official driver's standings

Manufacturers' Championship standings

	Pos	Manufacturer	Points
1	1	Chevrolet	182
1	2	Ford	173 (–9)
	3	Toyota	163 (–19)

- Note: Only the first 16 positions are included for the driver standings.

== Notes ==
Previous race: 2022 Ruoff Mortgage 500	NASCAR Cup Series; 2022 season	Next race: 2022 Texas Grand Prix
