= Josh Bilicki =

American racing driver (born 1995)

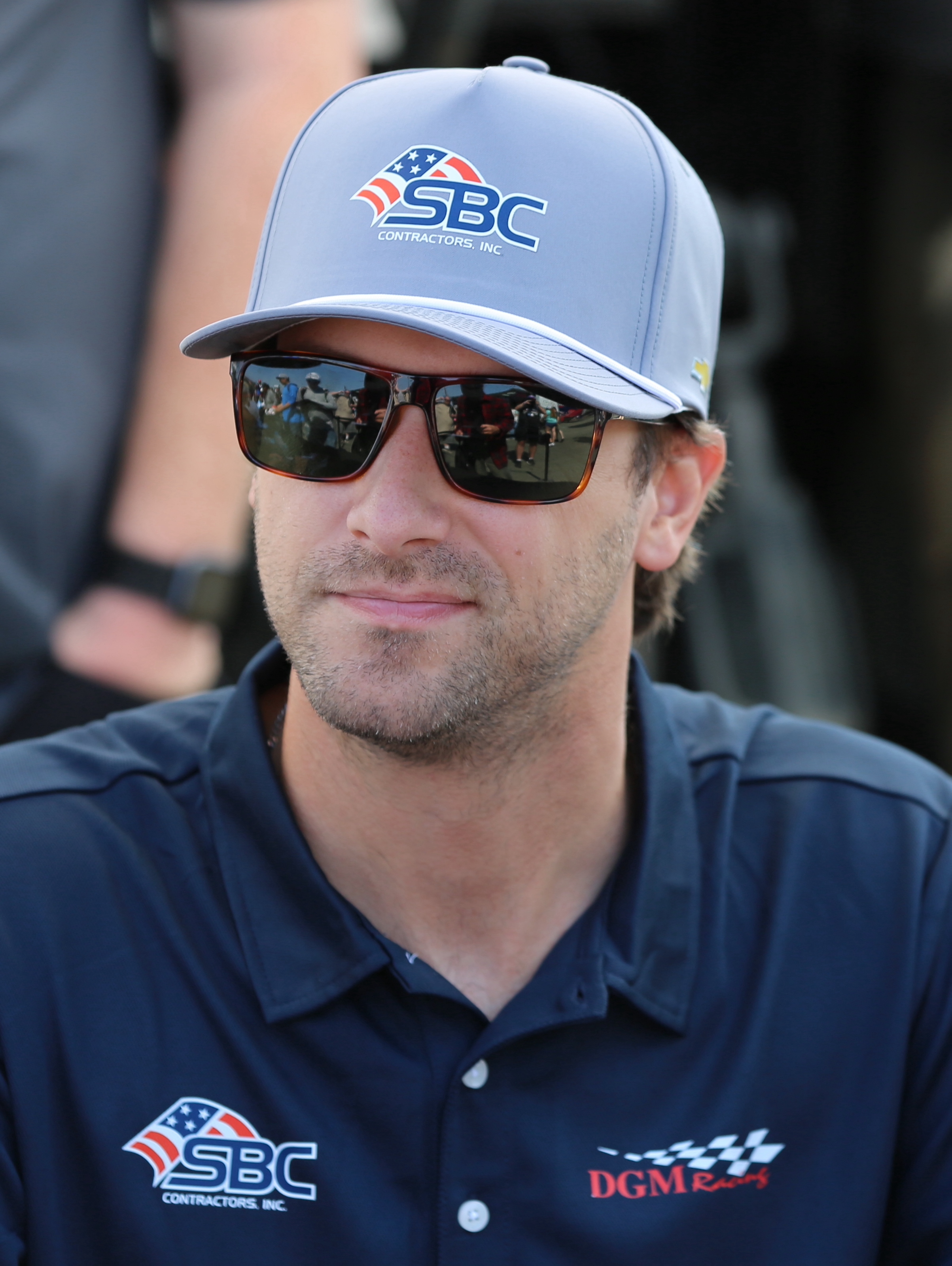
- Bilicki at Sonoma Raceway in 2025
- Born: Joshua Michael Bilicki; June 3, 1995 (age 31); Menomonee Falls, Wisconsin, U.S.

NASCAR Cup Series career
- 111 races run over 10 years
- Car no., team: No. 66 (Garage 66)
- 2026 position: 54th
- Best finish: 48th (2021, 2022)
- First race: 2017 Toyota/Save Mart 350 (Sonoma)
- Last race: 2026 Xfinity 500 (Martinsville)
Wins	Top tens	Poles
0	1	0

NASCAR O'Reilly Auto Parts Series career
- 160 races run over 11 years
- 2026 position: 25th
- Best finish: 25th (2026)
- First race: 2016 Road America 180 (Road America)
- Last race: 2026 O'Reilly Auto Parts 300 (Homestead)
Wins	Top tens	Poles
0	4	0

NASCAR FedEx Freight Truck Series career
- 13 races run over 5 years
- 2025 position: 87th
- Best finish: 87th (2025)
- First race: 2019 Digital Ally 250 (Kansas)
- Last race: 2025 Ecosave 250 (Charlotte Roval)
Wins	Top tens	Poles
0	2	0
- Statistics up to date as of November 8, 2026.

Joshua Michael Bilicki (born June 3, 1995) is an American professional stock car racing driver. He competes part-time in the NASCAR Cup Series, driving the No. 66 Ford Mustang Dark Horse for Garage 66. He has also previously competed in the NASCAR O'Reilly Auto Parts Series, NASCAR Craftsman Truck Series, and various sports car racing series.

== Racing career ==
=== Early years ===
Starting with kid-karts at age four, Bilicki quickly moved through the ranks and into the next classes. After several years in kid-karts and the Yamaha 100cc engine class, he moved to 80cc Shifter Karts. Bilicki showed his dominance quickly by winning many regional and national races, including the 2008 Road America SKUSA Super-Nationals, which brought competition from across the globe. Several times he even competed against and beat faster 125cc Shifter Karts. In 2011, Bilicki made the jump to 125cc Shifter Karts, and in 2012 Bilicki was recognized by and brought on board the Andrew Chase Racing-PCR team, competing in the Midwest Shifter Kart Series in a brand new PCR Shifter Kart.

=== Sports cars ===
After racing Shifter Karts at a top level for nearly five years, Bilicki made the transition to sportscars at age fifteen in 2011, beginning with Spec Miata and the Sports Car Club of America (SCCA). Within his first year of sportscar racing, he proved himself once again by earning two pole positions, four top-five finishing positions, and three podiums. After earning his national racing license in 2012, Bilicki began racing the SCCA Majors Tour and has qualified for the famed SCCA National Championship Runoffs every attempt tried. 2012 also marked his debut in an Area Sportsman Stock Car at a local circle track, Jefferson Speedway.

After several successful years of racing Spec Miata nationally, 2015 marked Bilicki's first year of professional sportscar racing in the IMSA Continental Tire Sportscar Challenge. He also raced a Spec Miata in the SCCA U.S. Majors Tour.

=== NASCAR ===
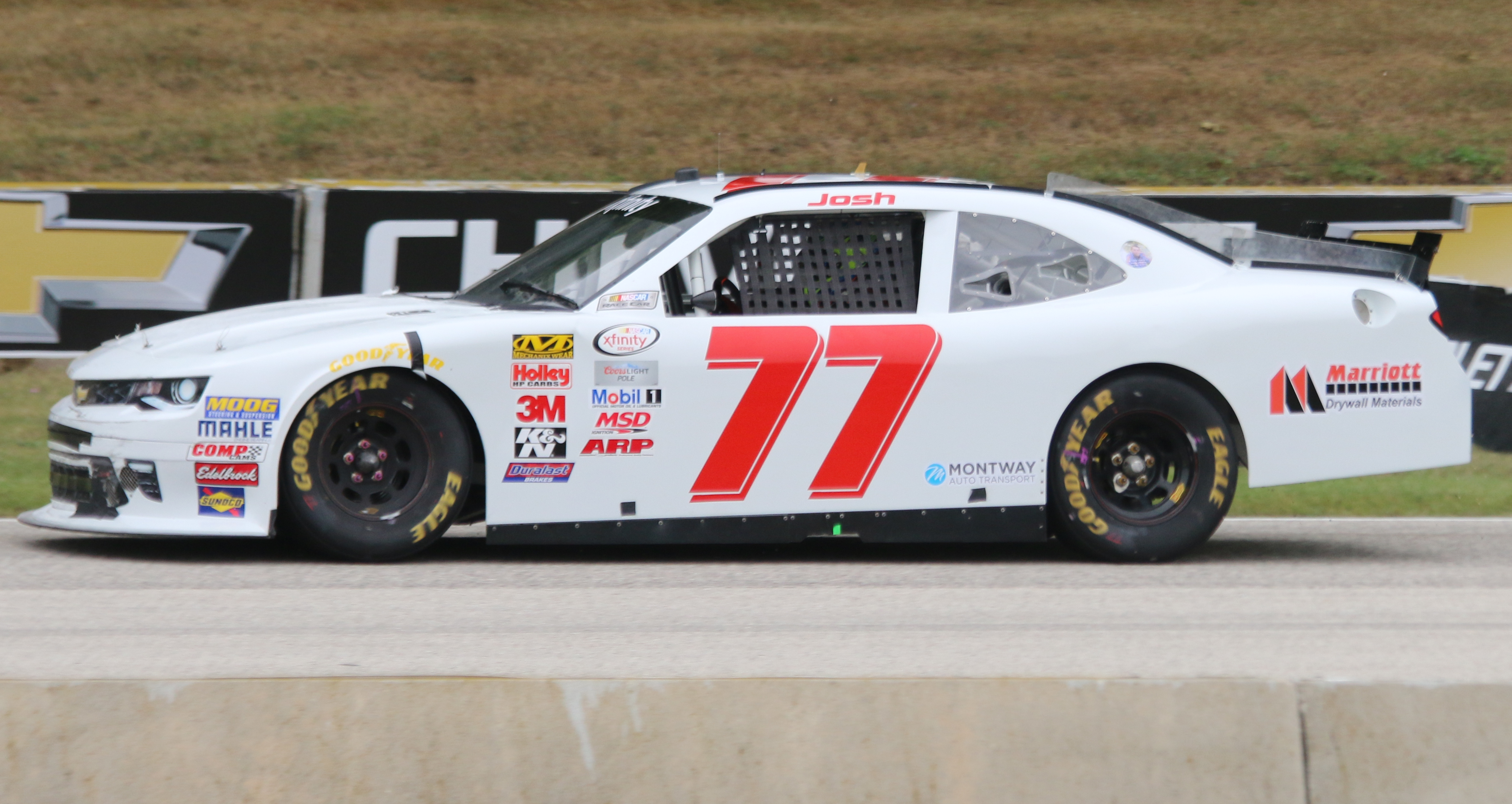
Bilicki's 2016 Xfinity Series car for Obaika Racing

Bilicki debuted in the Xfinity Series with Obaika Racing at Road America in 2016. In a blog post, he said that he got his ride by contacting teams that had "TBA" on the entry list the week of the race, and he got a call back from Obaika, offering him a spot. Unfortunately, a crash in qualifying and a dead battery during the race derailed his weekend at his home track, and he finished 38th. Bilicki returned to Obaika Racing, albeit this time in the No. 97, for the Ticket Galaxy 200, his first oval start since 2012. Starting last in the 40-car field, he avoided trouble and worked his way up to 28th position. He continued his stint with Obaika for the Ford EcoBoost 300, staying in the 97 car alongside Ryan Ellis in Obaika's other entry, the No. 77. Bilicki started 37th and finished 34th.

Bilicki returned to the No. 77 in 2017, along with other races planned with Obaika. In April, Bilicki announced he would make his Monster Energy NASCAR Cup Series debut in June's Toyota/Save Mart 350 at Sonoma Raceway, driving the No. 51 for Rick Ware Racing. After starting 33rd, he finished 36th. Bilicki also drove an Xfinity Series race at Michigan International Speedway for MBM Motorsports, finishing 27th. He ran another race for Rick Ware Racing in Cup, but it was not the second road course race as planned. Instead, Bilicki made his Monster Energy NASCAR Cup Series oval debut at New Hampshire. Later in the season, he signed a deal to run all three of the Xfinity road courses for B. J. McLeod Motorsports, running the organization's No. 8 entry. After pit road speeding penalties at Watkins Glen and a crash at Mid-Ohio, Bilicki ran down Elliott Sadler in the final green flag run to finish 12h at his home track, Road America. He continued his relationship with McLeod a couple weeks later, driving the team's flagship No. 78 at Chicagoland Speedway.

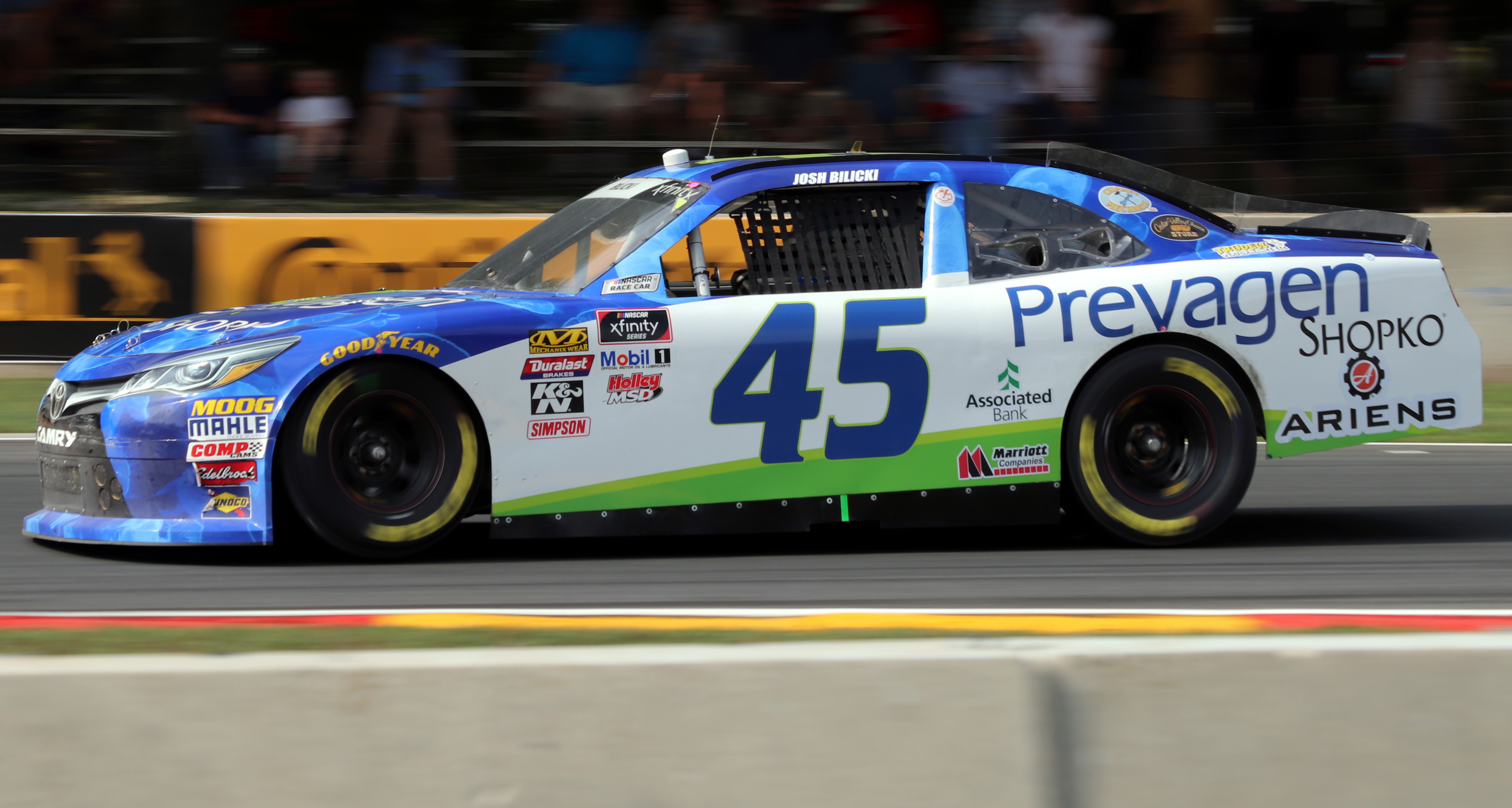
Bilicki's No. 45 in 2018 at Road America

On February 5, 2018, it was announced that Bilicki would attempt the full Xfinity season for startup team JP Motorsports, bringing with him previous sponsor Prevagen to the No. 45.

On February 4, 2019, it was announced that Bilicki would join RSS Racing to pilot the team's No. 38 Chevrolet Camaro for the full 2019 NASCAR Xfinity Series season. In May, he made his NASCAR Gander Outdoors Truck Series debut in the Digital Ally 250 at Kansas Speedway, driving the No. 34 for Reaume Brothers Racing. He also returned to the Monster Energy NASCAR Cup Series in June, driving for Rick Ware Racing at Michigan. Later in the month, he drove Ware's No. 53 at Chicagoland. Before the Kansas Lottery 300 in October, he announced he would drive for B. J. McLeod Motorsports for the remainder of the 2019 season.

On May 11, 2020, Bilicki and Tommy Baldwin Racing announced that they would partner for the 2020 The Real Heroes 400. He also drove sporadically for B. J. McLeod Motorsports, and tied his career-high finish in the Xfinity Series with a 12th place finish at the Daytona International Speedway road course.

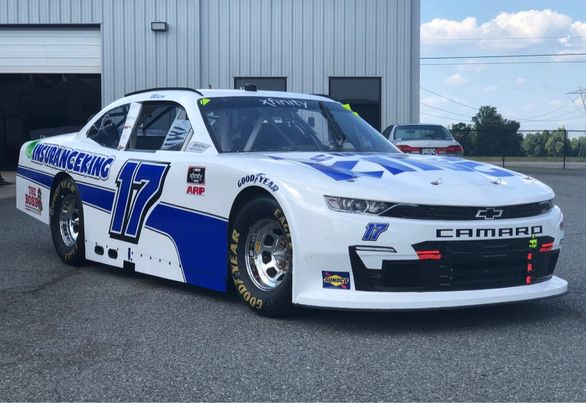
Bilicki's car for the 2021 Xfinity Series race at Watkins Glen

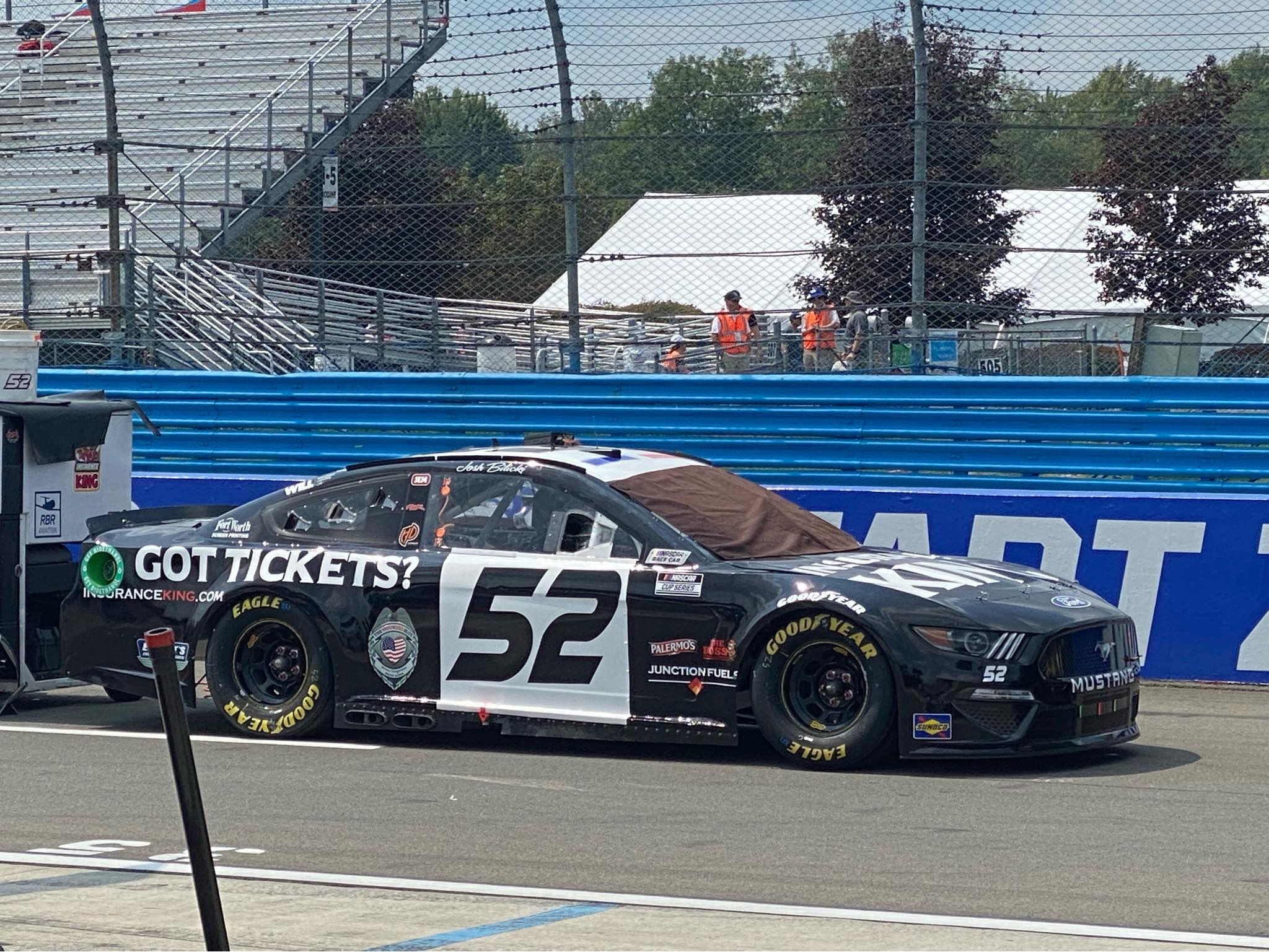
Bilicki's car for the 2021 Cup Series race at Watkins Glen

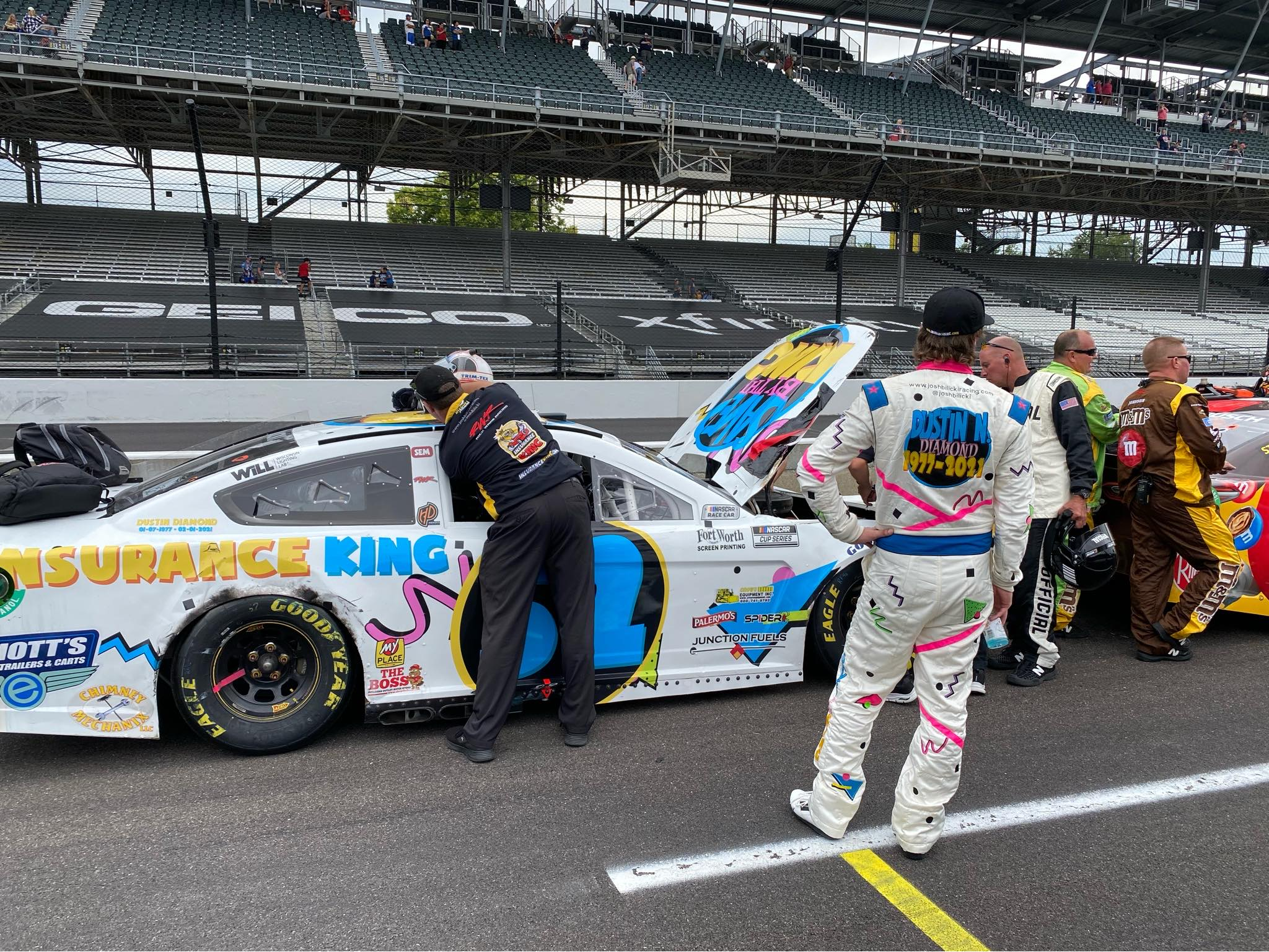
Bilicki standing next to his 2021 Verizon 200 at the Brickyard car

On January 19, 2021, Bilicki announced he would compete full-time in the Cup Series for RWR. In the 2021 Coke Zero Sugar 400, Bilicki survived to the finish, resulting in him initially finishing in 11th place. However, Chris Buescher would later be disqualified, promoting Bilicki up to tenth place. This marks Bilicki’s first-ever top-ten in the top three NASCAR divisions. He would also make a handful of starts in the NASCAR Xfinity Series for SS-Green Light Racing, driving the 07 and 17.

Bilicki would not return to Rick Ware Racing in 2022. Instead, he would drive the No. 77 Chevrolet Camaro ZL1 for Spire Motorsports, the team he drove for in two races in 2020, for a near-full season in the NASCAR Cup Series. In the 2022 Xfinity Series season, Bilicki would drive for DGM Racing in the 2022 Beef. It's What's for Dinner. 300. He finished ninth, scoring his first Xfinity Series top-ten in the process. He would also race for Alpha Prime Racing in the No. 44 and the No. 45.

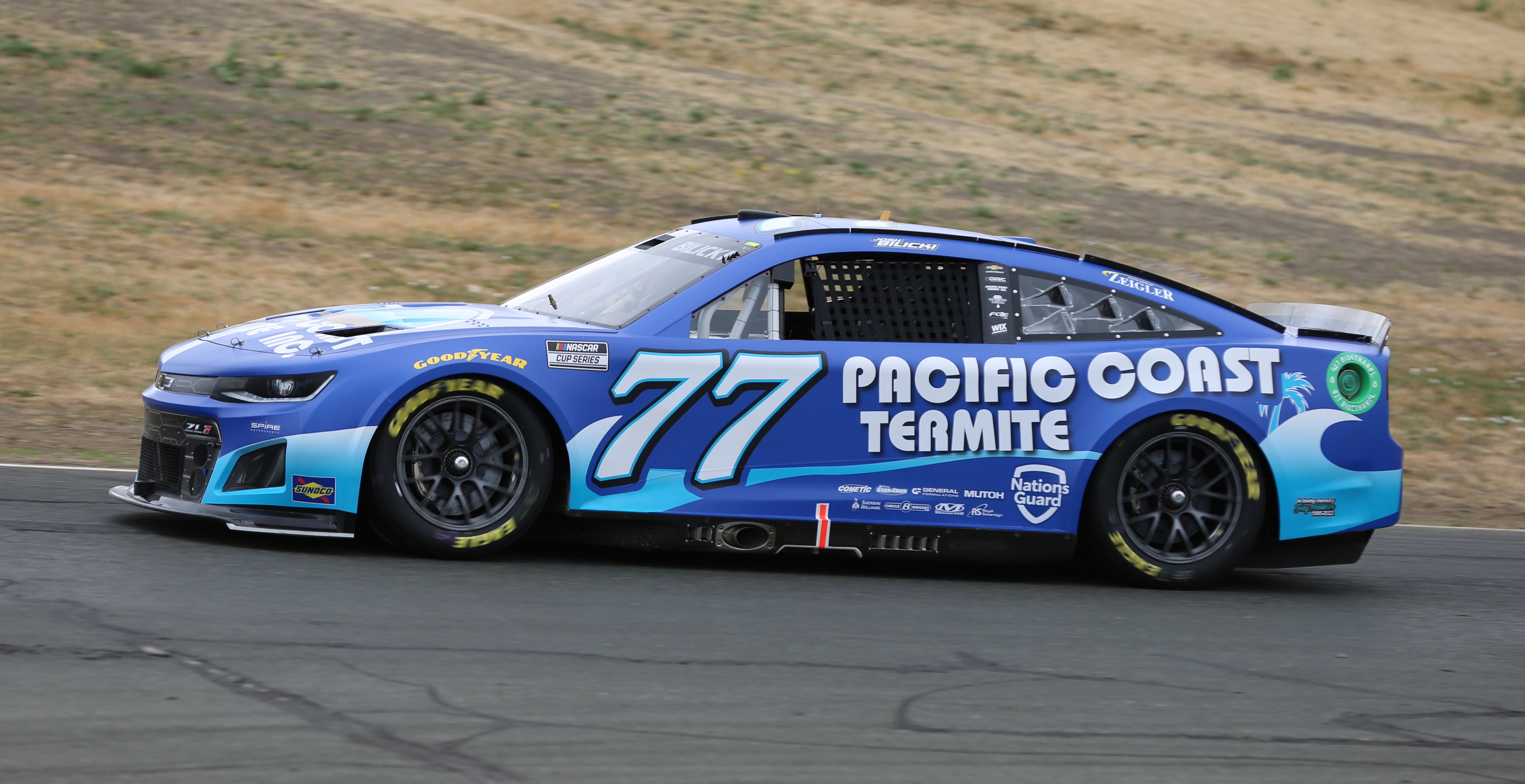
Bilicki’s No. 77 car at Sonoma Raceway in 2022

On December 12, 2022, Bilicki was announced to drive the Live Fast Motorsports No. 78 on a part-time schedule in 2023, starting at Circuit of the Americas. On January 12, 2023, it was also announced that he would run part-time in the Xfinity Series for DGM Racing split between the team's Nos. 36 and 91 cars. Bilicki also returned to SS-Green Light Racing to drive their No. 07 car in the Xfinity Series race at Watkins Glen after Chris Hacker, who was originally going to drive that car, was arrested in the week leading up to the race and suspended by NASCAR. Bilicki was actually the team's third pick to drive that car in that race, as Hacker had replaced Katherine Legge but Legge's sponsor (Blast Equality Collab) did not want to be on the car due to their members' connection with the writers' strike going on at the time. On August 25, 2023, Bilicki was announced to drive the No. 02 Young's Motorsports for the Milwaukee truck race. He would be involved in an early accident and would finish 36th.

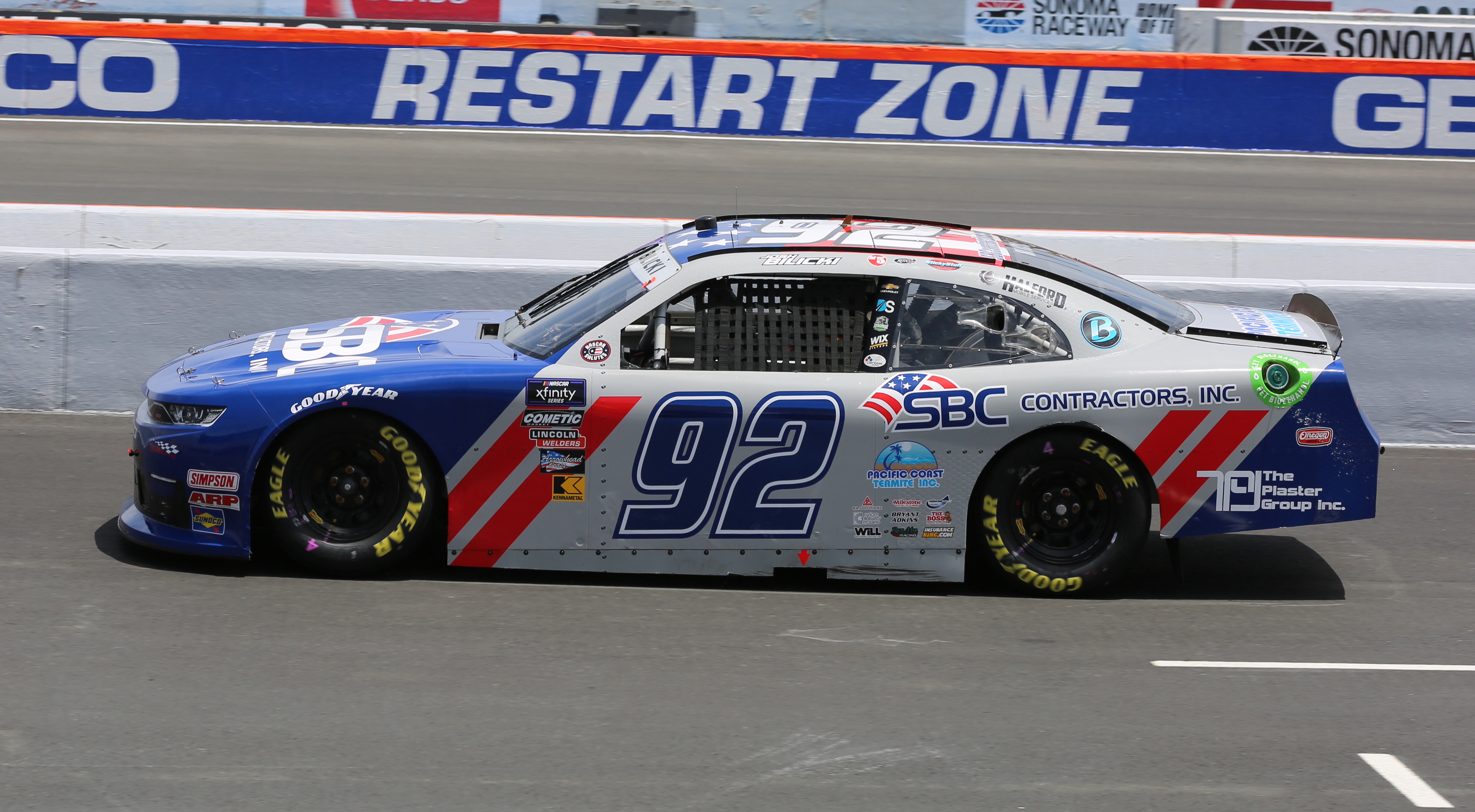
Bilicki's Xfinity car at Sonoma Raceway in 2024.

On January 4, 2024, it was announced that Bilicki would be one of the drivers of the DGM Racing No. 92 car in the Xfinity Series, starting at Daytona. On May 21, 2024, Bilicki was announced to drive the Joe Gibbs Racing No. 19 car at Portland. On June 20, it was announced that Bilicki would compete in the Cup Series race at the Chicago Street Course, driving the MBM Motorsports No. 66 Mustang. He would drive the DGM Racing No. 91 car in the race at Watkins Glen.

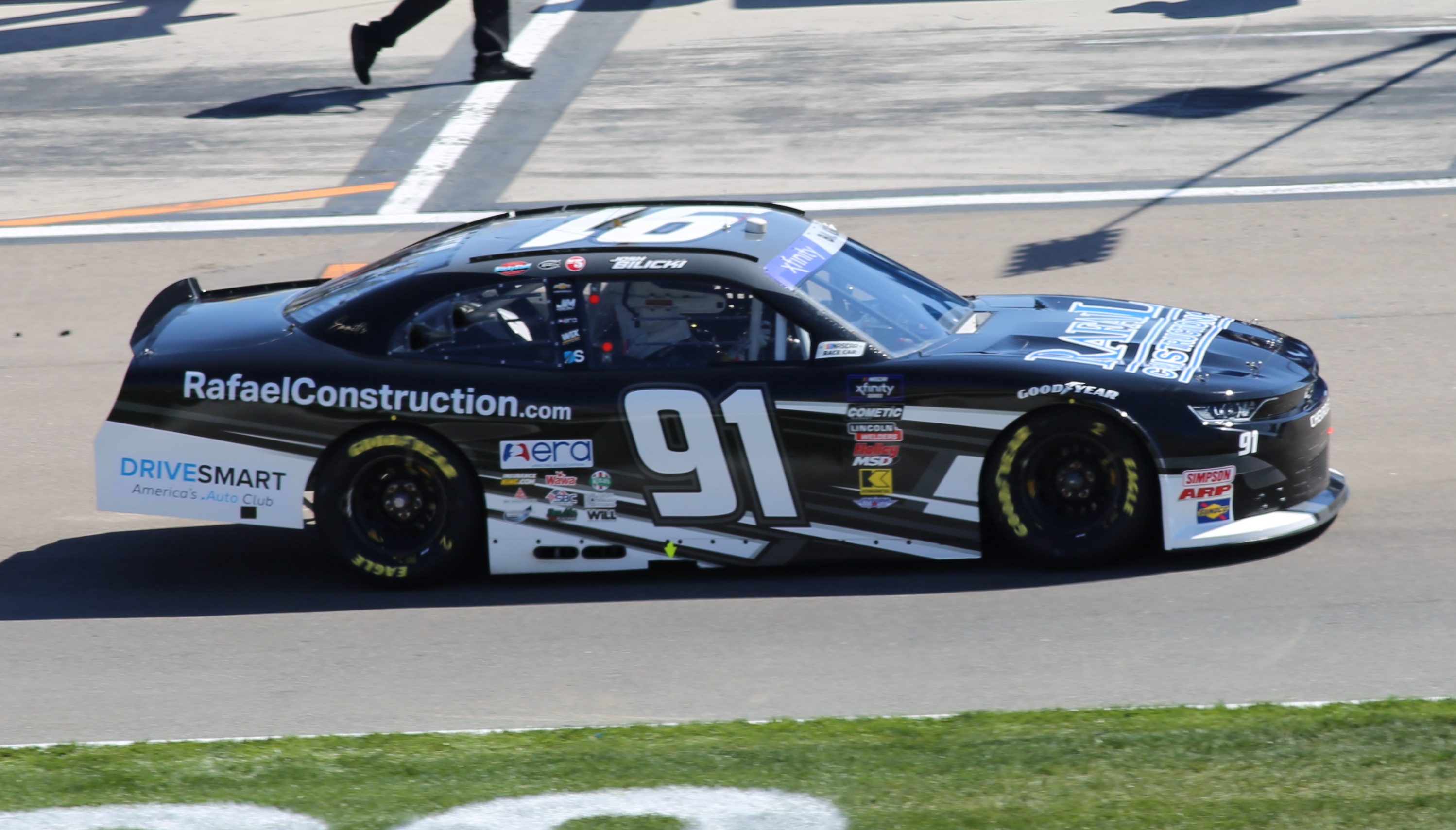
Bilicki's No. 91 car at Las Vegas Motor Speedway in 2025

In 2025, Bilicki returned to DGM on another part-time schedule. At Daytona, Bilicki was rear-ended on pit road by Kris Wright on Lap 86 after Wright failed to hit the brakes on his car. The impact sent the rear of Bilicki’s car into the air. Wright’s car was heavily damaged and despite the impact, Bilicki’s car suffered minimal damage and he was able to continue in the race while Wright’s race was over. Bilicki went on to finish in 14th place in the race.

On November 13, 2025, it was revealed that Bilicki would not return to DGM Racing in 2026. Later that month, on November 29, it was revealed that Bilicki would run the No. 07 Chevrolet for SS-Green Light Racing full-time. He finished 25th in the final points standings.

=== Snowmobile ===
Bilicki won the Outlaw 600 division race at the 2019 World Championship Snowmobile Derby in his home state.

== Personal life ==
Bilicki works as a driving coach and instructor when he is not behind the wheel. He is close friends with fellow NASCAR driver Camden Murphy.

== Motorsports career results ==
=== Racing career summary ===
Season	Series	Team	Races	Wins	Top 5	Top 10	Points	Position
2012	SCCA National Championship Runoffs	N/A	1	0	0	0	N/A	16th
2013	SCCA National Championship Runoffs	N/A	1	0	0	0	N/A	34th
2015	SCCA National Championship Runoffs	N/A	1	0	0	0	N/A	55th
2015	Continental Tire Sports Car Challenge	RS1	2	0	0	0	0	77th
2016	Continental Tire Sports Car Challenge	RS1	1	0	0	0	0	67th
2016	NASCAR Xfinity Series	Obaika Racing	3	0	0	0	23	62nd
2017	NASCAR Xfinity Series	Obaika Racing	0	0	0	0	63	44th
2017	NASCAR Xfinity Series	MBM Motorsports	1	0	0	0	63	44th
2017	NASCAR Xfinity Series	B. J. McLeod Motorsports	5	0	0	0	63	44th
2017	Monster Energy NASCAR Cup Series	Rick Ware Racing	2	0	0	0	0	NC†
2018	NASCAR Xfinity Series	JP Motorsports	29	0	0	0	202	33rd
2018	Monster Energy NASCAR Cup Series	Rick Ware Racing	1	0	0	0	0	NC†
2019	NASCAR Gander Outdoors Truck Series	Reaume Brothers Racing	3	0	0	0	7	90th
2019	NASCAR Xfinity Series	RSS Racing	19	0	0	0	0	NC†
2019	NASCAR Xfinity Series	B. J. McLeod Motorsports	3	0	0	0	0	NC†
2019	NASCAR Xfinity Series	Rick Ware Racing	1	0	0	0	0	NC†
2019	Monster Energy NASCAR Cup Series	Rick Ware Racing	10	0	0	0	0	NC†
2020	NASCAR Gander Outdoors Truck Series	Reaume Brothers Racing	5	0	0	0	0	NC†
2020	NASCAR Xfinity Series	B. J. McLeod Motorsports	7	0	0	0	140	34th
2020	NASCAR Cup Series	Tommy Baldwin Racing	12	0	0	0	0	NC†
2020	NASCAR Cup Series	Spire Motorsports	2	0	0	0	0	NC†
2020	NASCAR Cup Series	Rick Ware Racing	7	0	0	0	0	NC†
2021	NASCAR Xfinity Series	SS-Green Light Racing	4	0	0	0	1	71st
2021	NASCAR Cup Series	Rick Ware Racing	36	0	0	1	0	NC†
2022	NASCAR Camping World Truck Series	On Point Motorsports	1	0	0	0	0	NC†
2022	NASCAR Xfinity Series	DGM Racing	1	0	0	1	0	NC†
2022	NASCAR Xfinity Series	Alpha Prime Racing	6	0	0	0	0	NC†
2022	NASCAR Cup Series	Spire Motorsports	16	0	0	0	0	NC†
2023	NASCAR Craftsman Truck Series	Young's Motorsports	1	0	0	0	0	NC†
2023	NASCAR Xfinity Series	DGM Racing	9	0	0	1	164	33rd
2023	NASCAR Xfinity Series	SS-Green Light Racing	2	0	0	0	164	33rd
2023	NASCAR Cup Series	Live Fast Motorsports	10	0	0	0	0	NC†
2024	NASCAR Xfinity Series	DGM Racing	15	0	0	1	263	29th
2024	NASCAR Xfinity Series	Joe Gibbs Racing	2	0	0	1	263	29th
2024	NASCAR Cup Series	MBM Motorsports	4	0	0	0	0	NC†
2025	NASCAR Craftsman Truck Series	Niece Motorsports	2	0	0	2	0	NC†
2025	NASCAR Xfinity Series	DGM Racing	19	0	0	0	261	29th
2025	NASCAR Xfinity Series	SS-Green Light Racing	1	0	0	0	261	29th
2025	NASCAR Cup Series	Garage 66	6	0	0	0	0	NC†
2026	NASCAR O'Reilly Auto Parts Series	SS-Green Light Racing	33	0	0	0	386	25th
2026	NASCAR Cup Series	Garage 66	4	0	0	0	0	NC†

^{†} As Bilicki was a guest driver, he was ineligible for championship points.

=== SCCA National Championship Runoffs ===
Year	Track	Car	Engine	Class	Finish	Start	Status
2012	Road America	Mazda Miata	Mazda	Spec Miata	16	20	Running
2013	Road America	Mazda Miata	Mazda	Spec Miata	34	39	Running
2015	Daytona	Mazda Miata	Mazda	Spec Miata	55	43	Running

=== NASCAR ===
(key) (Bold – Pole position awarded by qualifying time. Italics – Pole position earned by points standings or practice time. * – Most laps led.)

==== Cup Series ====
NASCAR Cup Series results
Year	Team	No.	Make	1	2	3	4	5	6	7	8	9	10	11	12	13	14	15	16	17	18	19	20	21	22	23	24	25	26	27	28	29	30	31	32	33	34	35	36	NCSC	Pts	Ref
2017	Rick Ware Racing	51	Chevy	DAY	ATL	LVS	PHO	CAL	MAR	TEX	BRI	RCH	TAL	KAN	CLT	DOV	POC	MCH	SON; 36	DAY	KEN	NHA; 36	IND	POC	GLN	MCH	BRI	DAR	RCH	CHI	NHA	DOV	CLT	TAL	KAN	MAR	TEX	PHO	HOM	65th	0^{1}	
2018	Rick Ware Racing	51	Ford	DAY	ATL	LVS	PHO	CAL	MAR	TEX	BRI	RCH	TAL	DOV	KAN	CLT	POC	MCH	SON	CHI	DAY	KEN	NHA	POC	GLN; 36	MCH	BRI	DAR	IND	LVS	RCH	ROV	DOV	TAL	KAN	MAR	TEX	PHO	HOM	72nd	0^{1}	
2019	Rick Ware Racing	52	Chevy	DAY	ATL	LVS	PHO	CAL	MAR	TEX	BRI	RCH	TAL	DOV	KAN	CLT	POC	MCH; 33	SON						GLN; 32	MCH														58th	0^{1}	
2019	Rick Ware Racing	53	Chevy																	CHI; 33	DAY	KEN	NHA	POC; 35			BRI; 35	DAR				ROV; 38	DOV	TAL						58th	0^{1}	
2019	Rick Ware Racing	53	Ford																										IND; 29	LVS	RCH				KAN; 36	MAR				58th	0^{1}	
2019	Rick Ware Racing	51	Chevy																																		TEX; 30	PHO		58th	0^{1}	
2019	Rick Ware Racing	52	Ford																																				HOM; 36	58th	0^{1}	
2020	Tommy Baldwin Racing	7	Chevy	DAY	LVS	CAL	PHO	DAR; 34	DAR	CLT	CLT; 36	BRI					POC; 32	POC; 34	IND; 25						MCH; 33	DRC			DAY; 38	DAR; 32	RCH	BRI; 39				KAN; 35	TEX; 29	MAR; 32		49th	0^{1}	
2020	Rick Ware Racing	27	Ford										ATL; 34	MAR																										49th	0^{1}	
2020	Rick Ware Racing	53	Chevy												HOM; 37	TAL					TEX; 31	KAN; 25	NHA	MCH			DOV; 32	DOV; 32												49th	0^{1}	
2020	Rick Ware Racing	53	Ford																														LVS; 36	TAL						49th	0^{1}	
2020	Spire Motorsports	77	Chevy																	KEN; 32																			PHO; 35	49th	0^{1}	
2020	Rick Ware Racing	51	Ford																																ROV; 33					49th	0^{1}	
2021	Rick Ware Racing	52	Ford	DAY; 24	DRC; 36	HOM; 33	LVS; 35	PHO; 35	ATL; 37	BRD; 30	MAR; 23	RCH; 37	TAL; 36	KAN; 39	DAR; 33	DOV; 34	COA; 30	CLT; 35	SON; 29	NSH; 26	POC; 34	POC; 35	ROA; 23	ATL; 34	NHA; 34	GLN; 33	IRC; 18	MCH; 31	DAY; 10	DAR; 28	RCH; 36	BRI; 31	LVS; 36	TAL; 31		TEX; 26	KAN; 33	MAR; 35	PHO; 30	48th	0^{2}	
2021	Rick Ware Racing	15	Ford																																ROV; 28					48th	0^{2}	
2022	Spire Motorsports	77	Chevy	DAY	CAL; 30	LVS; 29	PHO	ATL; 16	COA; 22	RCH	MAR; 35	BRD	TAL	DOV; 32	DAR	KAN; 28	CLT; 36	GTW; 28	SON; 29	NSH; 33	ROA; 36	ATL	NHA; 34	POC; 34	IRC; 22	MCH; 21	RCH	GLN	DAY	DAR	KAN	BRI	TEX	TAL	ROV	LVS	HOM	MAR	PHO	48th	0^{1}	
2023	Live Fast Motorsports	78	Chevy	DAY	CAL	LVS	PHO	ATL	COA; 26	RCH	BRD	MAR	TAL	DOV	KAN; 33	DAR	CLT	GTW	SON; 30	NSH; 34	CSC; 23	ATL	NHA	POC	RCH	MCH; 32	IRC; 32	GLN; 27	DAY	DAR	KAN	BRI	TEX	TAL	ROV; 26	LVS	HOM; 35	MAR	PHO	51st	0^{1}	
2024	MBM Motorsports	66	Ford	DAY	ATL	LVS	PHO	BRI	COA	RCH	MAR	TEX	TAL	DOV	KAN	DAR	CLT	GTW	SON	IOW	NHA	NSH	CSC; 28	POC	IND	RCH	MCH	DAY	DAR	ATL	GLN	BRI; 34	KAN	TAL	ROV; 29	LVS	HOM	MAR; 37	PHO	58th	0^{1}	
2025	Garage 66	66	Ford	DAY	ATL	COA	PHO	LVS	HOM	MAR	DAR	BRI; 39	TAL	TEX	KAN	CLT; 33	NSH	MCH	MXC	POC	ATL	CSC; 21	SON	DOV	IND; 34	IOW	GLN; 37	RCH	DAY	DAR	GTW	BRI	NHA	KAN	ROV; 32	LVS	TAL	MAR	PHO	50th	0^{1}	
2026	Garage 66	66	Ford	DAY	ATL	COA	PHO	LVS	DAR	MAR	BRI	KAN	TAL	TEX	GLN; 34	CLT	NSH	MCH	POC	COR	SON	CHI; Wth	ATL	NWS	IND	IOW	RCH; 35	NHA	DAY	DAR	GTW	BRI; 37	KAN	LVS	CLT	PHO	TAL	MAR; 37	HOM	54th	0^{1}	

===== Daytona 500 =====
Year	Team	Manufacturer	Start	Finish
2021	Rick Ware Racing	Ford	37	24

==== O'Reilly Auto Parts Series ====
NASCAR O'Reilly Auto Parts Series results
Year	Team	No.	Make	1	2	3	4	5	6	7	8	9	10	11	12	13	14	15	16	17	18	19	20	21	22	23	24	25	26	27	28	29	30	31	32	33	NOAPSC	Pts	Ref
2016	Obaika Racing	77	Chevy	DAY	ATL	LVS	PHO	CAL	TEX	BRI	RCH	TAL	DOV	CLT	POC	MCH	IOW	DAY	KEN	NHA	IND	IOW	GLN	MOH	BRI	ROA; 38	DAR	RCH	CHI	KEN	DOV	CLT	KAN	TEX			62nd	23	
2016	Obaika Racing	97	Chevy																																PHO; 28	HOM; 34	62nd	23	
2017	Obaika Racing	77	Chevy	DAY	ATL	LVS; DNQ	PHO	CAL	TEX	BRI	RCH	TAL	CLT	DOV	POC																						44th	63	
2017	MBM Motorsports	40	Chevy													MCH; 27	IOW	DAY	KEN	NHA	IND	IOW															44th	63	
2017	B. J. McLeod Motorsports	8	Chevy																				GLN; 28	MOH; 29	BRI	ROA; 12	DAR	RCH									44th	63	
2017	B. J. McLeod Motorsports	78	Chevy																										CHI; 34	KEN	DOV; 30	CLT	KAN	TEX	PHO	HOM	44th	63	
2018	JP Motorsports	45	Toyota	DAY; DNQ	ATL; DNQ	LVS; 28	PHO; 32	CAL; 32	TEX; 24	BRI; 32	RCH; 33	TAL; 28	DOV; 29	CLT; 25	POC; 29	MCH; 27	IOW; 36	CHI; 35	DAY; 40	KEN; 28	NHA; 34	IOW; 40	GLN; 32	MOH; 20	BRI; 35	ROA; 30	DAR; 28	IND; 38	LVS; 27	RCH; 30	ROV; 24	DOV; 31	KAN; 20	TEX; Wth	PHO; 34	HOM; DNQ	33rd	202	
2019	RSS Racing	38	Chevy	DAY; 23	ATL; 34																NHA; DNQ	IOW															92nd	0^{1}	
2019	RSS Racing	93	Chevy			LVS; 36	PHO; 26	CAL; 29	TEX; 30	BRI; 36	RCH	TAL; 33	DOV; 38	CLT; 36	POC; 34	MCH; 21	IOW; 38	CHI; DNQ	DAY	KEN; 32			GLN; 26	MOH; 17	BRI	ROA; 20	DAR	IND; 21	LVS	RCH	ROV; 26	DOV					92nd	0^{1}	
2019	Rick Ware Racing	17	Chevy															CHI; 35																			92nd	0^{1}	
2019	B. J. McLeod Motorsports	99	Toyota																														KAN; 29	TEX; 21	PHO; 23	HOM	92nd	0^{1}	
2020	B. J. McLeod Motorsports	99	Toyota	DAY; 21	LVS	CAL; 29	PHO	DAR	CLT	BRI	ATL	HOM	HOM	TAL	POC	IRC; 23	KEN	KEN	TEX	KAN	ROA; 17	DRC; 12	DOV	DOV	DAY	DAR	RCH	RCH	BRI	LVS	TAL; 18						34th	140	
2020	B. J. McLeod Motorsports	78	Toyota																													ROV; 13	KAN	TEX	MAR	PHO	34th	140	
2021	SS-Green Light Racing with Rick Ware Racing	07	Chevy	DAY	DRC	HOM	LVS	PHO	ATL	MAR	TAL	DAR	DOV	COA	CLT	MOH	TEX	NSH	POC	ROA; 29	ATL	NHA		IRC; 25	MCH	DAY	DAR	RCH	BRI	LVS	TAL	ROV; 38	TEX	KAN	MAR	PHO	71st	1	
2021	SS-Green Light Racing with Rick Ware Racing	17	Chevy																				GLN; 24														71st	1	
2022	DGM Racing	36	Chevy	DAY; 9	CAL	LVS	PHO	ATL																													90th	0^{1}	
2022	Alpha Prime Racing	45	Chevy						COA; 35	RCH	MAR	TAL	DOV											MCH; 28	GLN; 17	DAY	DAR	KAN	BRI	TEX	TAL						90th	0^{1}	
2022	Alpha Prime Racing	44	Chevy											DAR; 28	TEX	CLT	PIR	NSH	ROA; 13	ATL	NHA	POC	IRC									ROV; 34	LVS	HOM	MAR	PHO	90th	0^{1}	
2023	DGM Racing	91	Chevy	DAY; DNQ	CAL	LVS; 31	PHO	ATL	COA; 28	RCH	MAR	TAL; 26	DOV	DAR	CLT	PIR				ATL; 18	NHA	POC	ROA; 8	MCH						BRI; 27	TEX				MAR; 23	PHO	33rd	164	
2023	DGM Racing	36	Chevy														SON; 19	NSH	CSC						IRC; 18												33rd	164	
2023	SS-Green Light Racing	07	Ford																							GLN; 25	DAY	DAR	KAN			ROV; 25	LVS	HOM			33rd	164	
2024	DGM Racing	92	Chevy	DAY; 32	ATL	LVS	PHO	COA; 31	RCH; 19	MAR	TEX; 29	TAL; 16	DOV	DAR; 22	CLT		SON; 16	IOW	NHA	NSH	CSC; 36	POC; 37	IND; 27	MCH; 24	DAY; 30	DAR	ATL		BRI; 20	KAN	TAL						29th	263	
2024	Joe Gibbs Racing	19	Toyota													PIR; 12																ROV; 8	LVS	HOM	MAR		29th	263	
2024	DGM Racing	91	Chevy																									GLN; 10								PHO; 21	29th	263	
2025	DGM Racing with Jesse Iwuji Motorsports	91	Chevy	DAY; 14	ATL; 30	COA; 22	PHO; 23	LVS; 31	HOM	MAR	DAR; 24	BRI	CAR; 17	TAL	TEX; 28	CLT	NSH		POC; 23	ATL	CSC; 35	SON; 14	DOV; 34	IND; 19	IOW; 21	GLN; 27	DAY; 18	PIR	GTW	BRI; 29	KAN	ROV; 21	LVS	TAL	MAR	PHO; 32	29th	261	
2025	SS-Green Light Racing with BRK Racing	14	Chevy															MXC; 24																			29th	261	
2026	SS-Green Light Racing	07	Chevy	DAY; 17	ATL; 15	COA; 36	PHO; 30	LVS; 23	DAR; 20	MAR; 35	CAR; 36	BRI; 23	KAN; 26	TAL; 14	TEX; 27	GLN; 22	DOV; 27	CLT; 25	NSH; 32	POC; 22	COR; 16	SON; 16	CHI; 36	ATL; 12	IND; 33	IOW; 31	DAY; 28	DAR; 24	GTW; 26	BRI; 31	LVS; 30	CLT; 18	PHO; 36	TAL; 16	MAR; 24	HOM; 30	25th	386	

==== Craftsman Truck Series ====
NASCAR Craftsman Truck Series results
Year	Team	No.	Make	1	2	3	4	5	6	7	8	9	10	11	12	13	14	15	16	17	18	19	20	21	22	23	24	25	NCTC	Pts	Ref
2019	Reaume Brothers Racing	34	Chevy	DAY	ATL	LVS	MAR	TEX	DOV	KAN; 18	CLT; DNQ	TEX	IOW	GTW		KEN; 20	POC	ELD	MCH	BRI	MSP	LVS	TAL	MAR	PHO				90th	7	
2019	Reaume Brothers Racing	33	Chevy												CHI; 19											HOM; 30			90th	7	
2020	Reaume Brothers Racing	34	Chevy	DAY	LVS; 32	CLT	ATL	HOM	POC	KEN	TEX	KAN	KAN	MCH	DRC	DOV	GTW	DAR											88th	0^{1}	
2020	Reaume Brothers Racing	33	Toyota																RCH; 25				KAN; 28						88th	0^{1}	
2020	Reaume Brothers Racing	00	Toyota																	BRI; 26	LVS	TAL		TEX; 19	MAR	PHO			88th	0^{1}	
2022	On Point Motorsports	30	Toyota	DAY	LVS	ATL	COA	MAR	BRD	DAR	KAN	TEX	CLT	GTW	SON; 30	KNX	NSH	MOH	POC	IRP	RCH	KAN	BRI	TAL	HOM	PHO			102nd	0^{1}	
2023	Young's Motorsports	02	Chevy	DAY	LVS	ATL	COA	TEX	BRD	MAR	KAN	DAR	NWS	CLT	GTW	NSH	MOH	POC	RCH	IRP	MLW; 36	KAN	BRI	TAL	HOM	PHO			112th	0^{1}	
2025	Niece Motorsports	44	Chevy	DAY	ATL	LVS	HOM	MAR	BRI	CAR	TEX	KAN	NWS	CLT	NSH	MCH	POC	LRP; 7	IRP	GLN	RCH	DAR	BRI	NHA					87th	0^{1}	
2025	Niece Motorsports	41	Chevy																						ROV; 6	TAL	MAR	PHO	87th	0^{1}	

^{*} Season still in progress
^{1} Ineligible for series points
^{2} Bilicki switched from Cup points to Xfinity points in late 2021
