= 2020 Xfinity 500 =

NASCAR Cup Series race

Race details
- Race 35 of 36 in the 2020 NASCAR Cup Series
- 2020 Xfinity 500 program cover
- Date: November 1, 2020
- Location: Martinsville Speedway in Ridgeway, Virginia
- Course: Permanent racing facility
- Course length: .526 miles (.847 km)
- Distance: 500 laps, 263 mi (423.5 km)
- Average speed: 71.581 miles per hour (115.198 km/h)

Pole position
Driver	Brad Keselowski	Team Penske
- Grid positions set by competition-based formula

Most laps led
Driver	Chase Elliott	Hendrick Motorsports
- Laps: 236

Winner
No. 9	Chase Elliott	Hendrick Motorsports

Television in the United States
- Network: NBC
- Announcers: Rick Allen, Jeff Burton, Steve Letarte and Dale Earnhardt Jr.
- Nielsen ratings: 2.718 million

Radio in the United States
- Radio: MRN
- Booth announcers: Alex Hayden and Jeff Striegle
- Turn announcers: Dave Moody (Backstretch)

The 2020 Xfinity 500 was a NASCAR Cup Series race held on November 1, 2020 at Martinsville Speedway in Ridgeway, Virginia. Contested over 500 laps on the .526 mile (.847 km) short track, it was the 35th race of the 2020 NASCAR Cup Series season, the ninth race of the Playoffs, and final race of the Round of 8.

== Report ==
=== Background ===
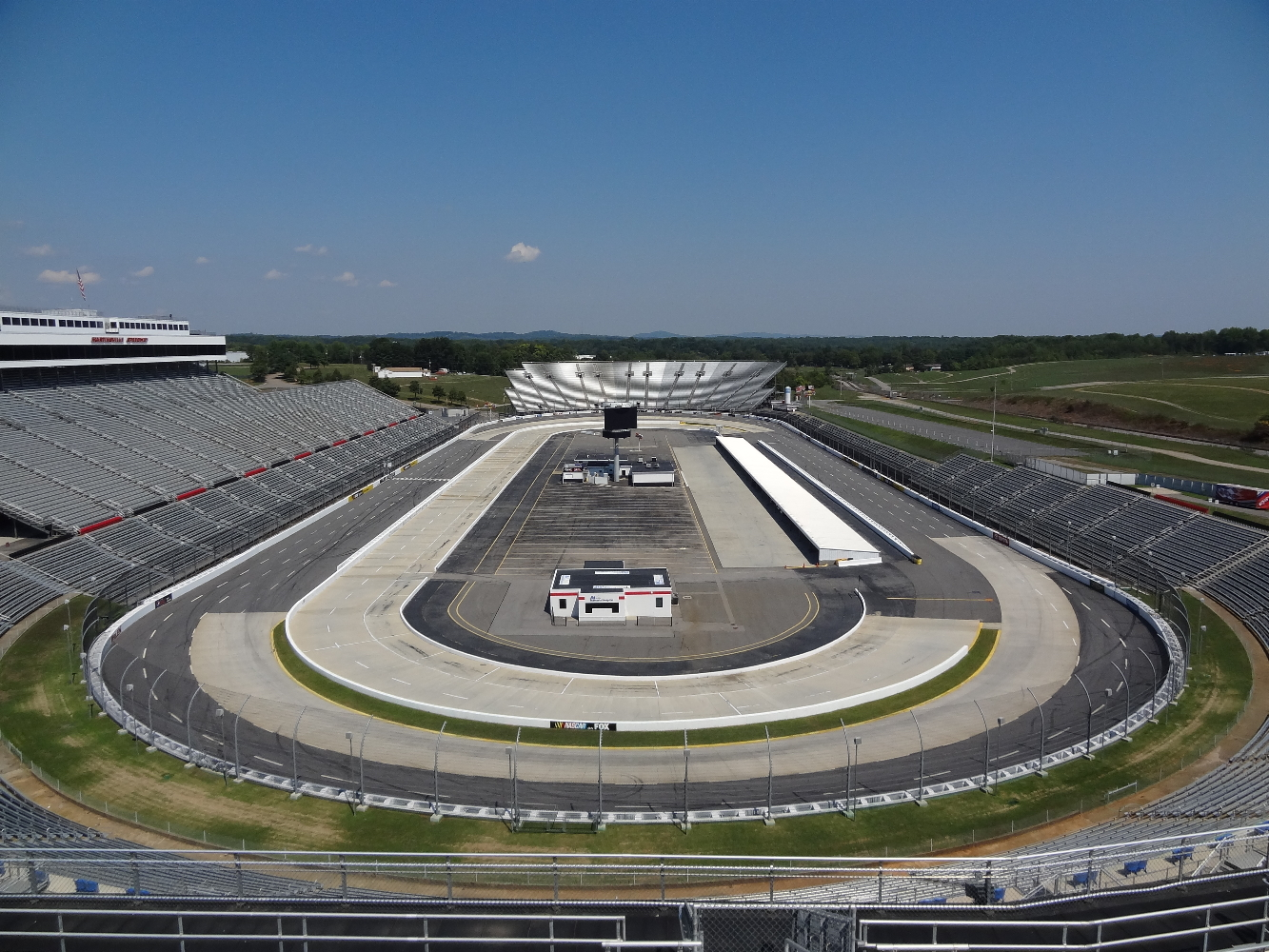
Martinsville Speedway, the track where the race was held.

Martinsville Speedway is an International Speedway Corporation-owned NASCAR stock car racing track located in Henry County, in Ridgeway, Virginia, just to the south of Martinsville. At 0.526 miles (0.847 km) in length, it is the shortest track in the NASCAR Cup Series. The track is also one of the first paved oval tracks in NASCAR, being built in 1947 by H. Clay Earles. It is also the only race track that has been on the NASCAR circuit from its beginning in 1948. Along with this, Martinsville is the only NASCAR oval track on the entire NASCAR track circuit to have asphalt surfaces on the straightaways, then concrete to cover the turns.

==== Entry list ====
- (R) denotes rookie driver.
- (i) denotes driver who are ineligible for series driver points.

No.	Driver	Team	Manufacturer
00	Quin Houff (R)	StarCom Racing	Chevrolet
1	Kurt Busch	Chip Ganassi Racing	Chevrolet
2	Brad Keselowski	Team Penske	Ford
3	Austin Dillon	Richard Childress Racing	Chevrolet
4	Kevin Harvick	Stewart-Haas Racing	Ford
6	Ryan Newman	Roush Fenway Racing	Ford
7	Josh Bilicki (i)	Tommy Baldwin Racing	Chevrolet
8	Tyler Reddick (R)	Richard Childress Racing	Chevrolet
9	Chase Elliott	Hendrick Motorsports	Chevrolet
10	Aric Almirola	Stewart-Haas Racing	Ford
11	Denny Hamlin	Joe Gibbs Racing	Toyota
12	Ryan Blaney	Team Penske	Ford
13	Ty Dillon	Germain Racing	Chevrolet
14	Clint Bowyer	Stewart-Haas Racing	Ford
15	Brennan Poole (R)	Premium Motorsports	Chevrolet
17	Chris Buescher	Roush Fenway Racing	Ford
18	Kyle Busch	Joe Gibbs Racing	Toyota
19	Martin Truex Jr.	Joe Gibbs Racing	Toyota
20	Erik Jones	Joe Gibbs Racing	Toyota
21	Matt DiBenedetto	Wood Brothers Racing	Ford
22	Joey Logano	Team Penske	Ford
24	William Byron	Hendrick Motorsports	Chevrolet
27	J. J. Yeley (i)	Rick Ware Racing	Ford
32	Corey LaJoie	Go Fas Racing	Ford
34	Michael McDowell	Front Row Motorsports	Ford
37	Ryan Preece	JTG Daugherty Racing	Chevrolet
38	John Hunter Nemechek (R)	Front Row Motorsports	Ford
41	Cole Custer (R)	Stewart-Haas Racing	Ford
42	Matt Kenseth	Chip Ganassi Racing	Chevrolet
43	Bubba Wallace	Richard Petty Motorsports	Chevrolet
47	Ricky Stenhouse Jr.	JTG Daugherty Racing	Chevrolet
48	Jimmie Johnson	Hendrick Motorsports	Chevrolet
51	Joey Gase (i)	Petty Ware Racing	Ford
53	James Davison	Rick Ware Racing	Ford
66	Timmy Hill (i)	MBM Motorsports	Toyota
77	Garrett Smithley (i)	Spire Motorsports	Chevrolet
88	Alex Bowman	Hendrick Motorsports	Chevrolet
95	Christopher Bell (R)	Leavine Family Racing	Toyota
96	Daniel Suárez	Gaunt Brothers Racing	Toyota
Official entry list

== Qualifying ==
Brad Keselowski was awarded the pole for the race as determined by competition-based formula.

=== Starting Lineup ===
Pos	No.	Driver	Team	Manufacturer
1	2	Brad Keselowski	Team Penske	Ford
2	19	Martin Truex Jr.	Joe Gibbs Racing	Toyota
3	88	Alex Bowman	Hendrick Motorsports	Chevrolet
4	11	Denny Hamlin	Joe Gibbs Racing	Toyota
5	1	Kurt Busch	Chip Ganassi Racing	Chevrolet
6	4	Kevin Harvick	Stewart-Haas Racing	Ford
7	22	Joey Logano	Team Penske	Ford
8	9	Chase Elliott	Hendrick Motorsports	Chevrolet
9	18	Kyle Busch	Joe Gibbs Racing	Toyota
10	12	Ryan Blaney	Team Penske	Ford
11	95	Christopher Bell (R)	Leavine Family Racing	Toyota
12	21	Matt DiBenedetto	Wood Brothers Racing	Ford
13	24	William Byron	Hendrick Motorsports	Chevrolet
14	3	Austin Dillon	Richard Childress Racing	Chevrolet
15	41	Cole Custer (R)	Stewart-Haas Racing	Ford
16	14	Clint Bowyer	Stewart-Haas Racing	Ford
17	8	Tyler Reddick (R)	Richard Childress Racing	Chevrolet
18	47	Ricky Stenhouse Jr.	JTG Daugherty Racing	Chevrolet
19	20	Erik Jones	Joe Gibbs Racing	Toyota
20	10	Aric Almirola	Stewart-Haas Racing	Ford
21	6	Ryan Newman	Roush Fenway Racing	Ford
22	37	Ryan Preece	JTG Daugherty Racing	Chevrolet
23	38	John Hunter Nemechek (R)	Front Row Motorsports	Ford
24	34	Michael McDowell	Front Row Motorsports	Ford
25	13	Ty Dillon	Germain Racing	Chevrolet
26	32	Corey LaJoie	Go Fas Racing	Ford
27	48	Jimmie Johnson	Hendrick Motorsports	Chevrolet
28	17	Chris Buescher	Roush Fenway Racing	Ford
29	96	Daniel Suárez	Gaunt Brothers Racing	Toyota
30	15	Brennan Poole (R)	Premium Motorsports	Chevrolet
31	42	Matt Kenseth	Chip Ganassi Racing	Chevrolet
32	43	Bubba Wallace	Richard Petty Motorsports	Chevrolet
33	7	Josh Bilicki (i)	Tommy Baldwin Racing	Chevrolet
34	66	Timmy Hill (i)	MBM Motorsports	Toyota
35	00	Quin Houff (R)	StarCom Racing	Chevrolet
36	77	Garrett Smithley (i)	Spire Motorsports	Chevrolet
37	53	James Davison	Rick Ware Racing	Ford
38	27	J. J. Yeley (i)	Rick Ware Racing	Ford
39	51	Joey Gase (i)	Petty Ware Racing	Ford
Official starting lineup

== Race ==
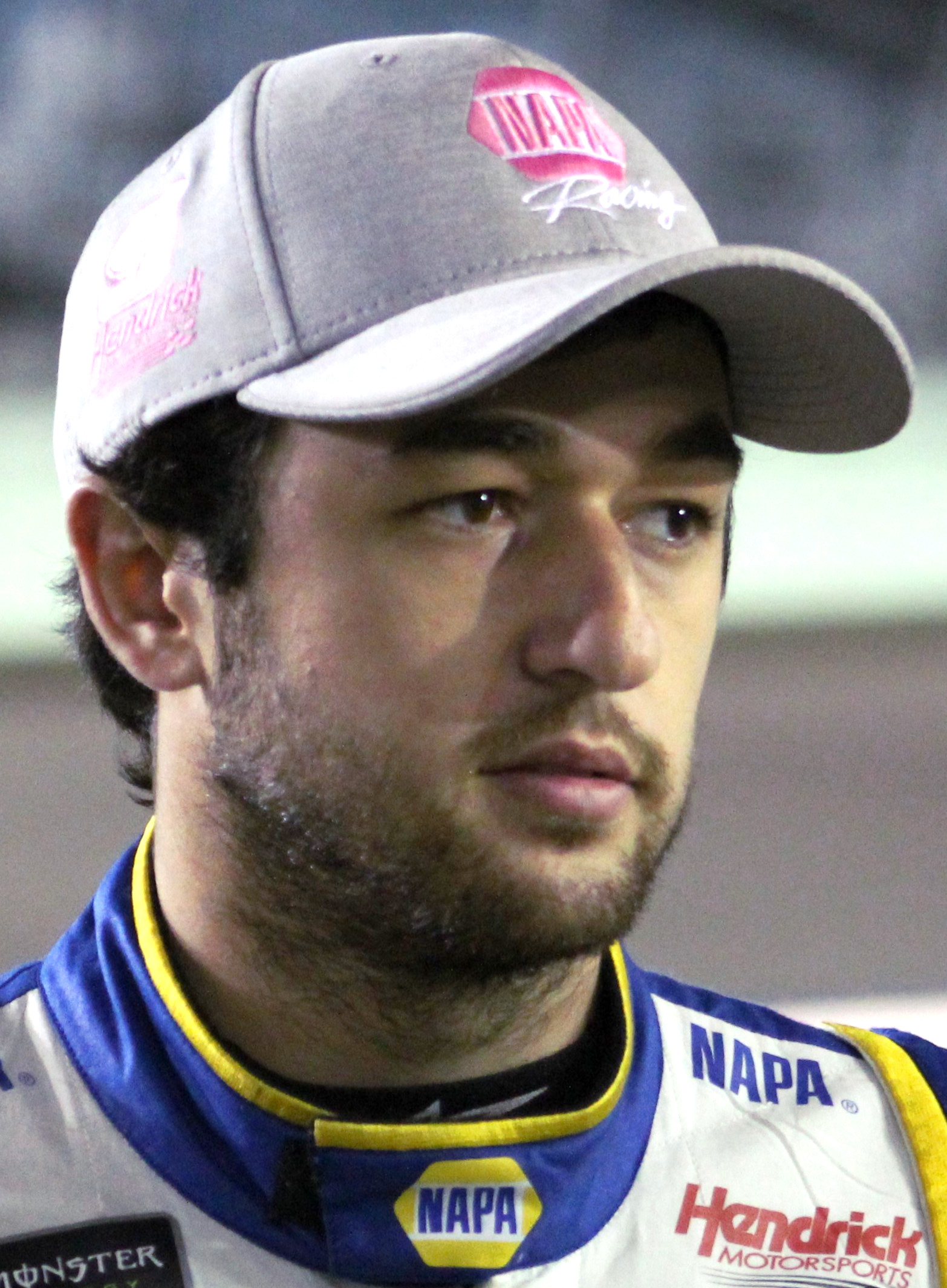
Chase Elliott won the race.

=== Stage Results ===
Stage One Laps: 130

Pos	No	Driver	Team	Manufacturer	Points
1	11	Denny Hamlin	Joe Gibbs Racing	Toyota	10
2	88	Alex Bowman	Hendrick Motorsports	Chevrolet	9
3	2	Brad Keselowski	Team Penske	Ford	8
4	9	Chase Elliott	Hendrick Motorsports	Chevrolet	7
5	22	Joey Logano	Team Penske	Ford	6
6	19	Martin Truex Jr.	Joe Gibbs Racing	Toyota	5
7	18	Kyle Busch	Joe Gibbs Racing	Toyota	4
8	24	William Byron	Hendrick Motorsports	Chevrolet	3
9	1	Kurt Busch	Chip Ganassi Racing	Chevrolet	2
10	48	Jimmie Johnson	Hendrick Motorsports	Chevrolet	1
Official stage one results

Stage Two Laps: 130

Pos	No	Driver	Team	Manufacturer	Points
1	9	Chase Elliott	Hendrick Motorsports	Chevrolet	10
2	19	Martin Truex Jr.	Joe Gibbs Racing	Toyota	9
3	11	Denny Hamlin	Joe Gibbs Racing	Toyota	8
4	12	Ryan Blaney	Team Penske	Ford	7
5	1	Kurt Busch	Chip Ganassi Racing	Chevrolet	6
6	18	Kyle Busch	Joe Gibbs Racing	Toyota	5
7	2	Brad Keselowski	Team Penske	Ford	4
8	22	Joey Logano	Team Penske	Ford	3
9	88	Alex Bowman	Hendrick Motorsports	Chevrolet	2
10	6	Ryan Newman	Roush Fenway Racing	Ford	1
Official stage two results

=== Final Stage Results ===
Stage Three Laps: 240

Pos	Grid	No	Driver	Team	Manufacturer	Laps	Points
1	8	9	Chase Elliott	Hendrick Motorsports	Chevrolet	500	57
2	10	12	Ryan Blaney	Team Penske	Ford	500	42
3	7	22	Joey Logano	Team Penske	Ford	500	43
4	1	2	Brad Keselowski	Team Penske	Ford	500	45
5	5	1	Kurt Busch	Chip Ganassi Racing	Chevrolet	500	39
6	3	88	Alex Bowman	Hendrick Motorsports	Chevrolet	500	42
7	20	10	Aric Almirola	Stewart-Haas Racing	Ford	500	30
8	16	14	Clint Bowyer	Stewart-Haas Racing	Ford	500	29
9	9	18	Kyle Busch	Joe Gibbs Racing	Toyota	500	37
10	12	21	Matt DiBenedetto	Wood Brothers Racing	Ford	500	27
11	4	11	Denny Hamlin	Joe Gibbs Racing	Toyota	500	44
12	19	20	Erik Jones	Joe Gibbs Racing	Toyota	500	25
13	15	41	Cole Custer (R)	Stewart-Haas Racing	Ford	500	24
14	31	42	Matt Kenseth	Chip Ganassi Racing	Chevrolet	500	23
15	11	95	Christopher Bell (R)	Leavine Family Racing	Toyota	500	22
16	25	13	Ty Dillon	Germain Racing	Chevrolet	500	21
17	6	4	Kevin Harvick	Stewart-Haas Racing	Ford	500	20
18	21	6	Ryan Newman	Roush Fenway Racing	Ford	499	20
19	22	37	Ryan Preece	JTG Daugherty Racing	Chevrolet	499	18
20	18	47	Ricky Stenhouse Jr.	JTG Daugherty Racing	Chevrolet	499	17
21	32	43	Bubba Wallace	Richard Petty Motorsports	Chevrolet	499	16
22	2	19	Martin Truex Jr.	Joe Gibbs Racing	Toyota	499	29
23	14	3	Austin Dillon	Richard Childress Racing	Chevrolet	498	14
24	17	8	Tyler Reddick (R)	Richard Childress Racing	Chevrolet	498	13
25	26	32	Corey LaJoie	Go Fas Racing	Ford	498	12
26	23	38	John Hunter Nemechek (R)	Front Row Motorsports	Ford	498	11
27	29	96	Daniel Suárez	Gaunt Brothers Racing	Toyota	497	10
28	24	34	Michael McDowell	Front Row Motorsports	Ford	497	9
29	34	66	Timmy Hill (i)	MBM Motorsports	Toyota	495	0
30	27	48	Jimmie Johnson	Hendrick Motorsports	Chevrolet	495	8
31	38	27	J. J. Yeley (i)	Rick Ware Racing	Ford	494	0
32	33	7	Josh Bilicki (i)	Tommy Baldwin Racing	Chevrolet	490	0
33	35	00	Quin Houff (R)	StarCom Racing	Chevrolet	489	4
34	39	51	Joey Gase (i)	Petty Ware Racing	Ford	447	0
35	13	24	William Byron	Hendrick Motorsports	Chevrolet	439	5
36	37	53	James Davison	Rick Ware Racing	Ford	422	1
37	30	15	Brennan Poole (R)	Premium Motorsports	Chevrolet	184	1
38	28	17	Chris Buescher	Roush Fenway Racing	Ford	146	1
39	36	77	Garrett Smithley (i)	Spire Motorsports	Chevrolet	100	0
Official race results

=== Race statistics ===
- Lead changes: 20 among 10 different drivers
- Cautions/Laps: 12 for 83
- Red flags: 0
- Time of race: 3 hours, 40 minutes and 27 seconds
- Average speed: 71.581 miles per hour (115.198 km/h)

=== Post-race investigation ===
At the start of the race, three transfer spots were still available as only Joey Logano had clinched from his win at Kansas (he had 4,094 points). Kevin Harvick (4,137 points) led Denny Hamlin (4,122) and Brad Keselowski (4,120) for the three positions. Chase Elliott and Alex Bowman were tied at 4,095 points, Martin Truex, Jr. (4,084), and Kurt Busch (4,039) were the positions. Kurt Busch had to win. If Elliott, Bowman, Truex, or Kurt Busch won, the winning driver would move to the second position and only two positions would be available from points. That meant Harvick's lead over fourth was 17 points.

As Truex or Elliott led for the majority of the second half, it would mean only two of the three could advance should either win. Harvick struggled all day and had been numerous laps down because of a green flag pit stop from a cut tire, returning to the lead lap on a Lap 401 safety car caused by James Davison stalling. On that safety car, Keselowski committed a speeding infraction. Hamlin's car was struggling once lights were turned on as the sun was setting. With 25 laps remaining, Keselowski was 6th, Hamlin was 11th, and Harvick was 12th. At that time, Hamlin's teammate Erik Jones, who did not make the playoff and was leaving the team at the end of the season, was behind Hamlin. The points were Hamlin up four, Keselowski one ahead, and Harvick one behind the cut line. With two laps remaining, it was Keselowski (4th) and Hamlin (12th) at the cut line, with Harvick (10th) one behind and Hamlin ahead of Jones. In order to cause a three-way tie that would eliminate Keselowski on tiebreaker (the driver whose best finish in the three race round was the worst of three would be eliminated), Harvick made a desperation pass on Kyle Busch. The two made contact and Busch finished 9th, while Harvick finished 17th, being eliminated.

On Monday morning, less than 15 hours after the race concluded, NASCAR senior vice president of competition Scott Miller informed SiriusXM NASCAR Radio that the sanctioning body will be investigating both Harvick's deliberate crash into Kyle Busch, and team orders on the radio by Joe Gibbs Racing to ask Jones not to pass Hamlin in order to help Hamlin advance to the final. NBC Sports posted conversations among the No. 20 Gibbs team's driver (Jones), crew chief Chris Gayle, and spotter Rick Carelli, where Gayle told Jones that Hamlin is "going to race you hard because he needs to, because it’s within like three points for those guys. He’s going to race you hard because it’s three points on those guys. Just so you’re aware.” Jones responded to Gayle, “I’ve got a huge gap behind me.” Four laps later, Carelli responded on the radio, "Don’t pass (Hamlin), Jones. Stay with him and drive what you can."

NASCAR ultimately did not issue penalties for Jones' or Harvick's team.

== Media ==
=== Television ===
NBC Sports covered the race on the television side. Rick Allen, 1997 race winner Jeff Burton, Steve Letarte and 2014 race winner Dale Earnhardt Jr. called the action from the booth. Dave Burns, Parker Kligerman and Marty Snider handled the pit road duties.

NBC
Booth announcers	Pit reporters
Lap-by-lap: Rick Allen; Color-commentator: Jeff Burton; Color-commentator: Steve Letarte; Color-commentator: Dale Earnhardt Jr.	Dave Burns; Parker Kligerman; Marty Snider

=== Radio ===
MRN covered the radio call for the race, which was simulcast on Sirius XM NASCAR Radio. Alex Hayden and Jeff Striegle had the call for MRN when the field raced down the front straightaway. Dave Moody covered the action for MRN when the field raced down the backstraightway into turn 3. Winston Kelley and Steve Post covered the action for MRN from pit lane.

MRN
Booth announcers	Turn announcers	Pit reporters
Lead announcer: Alex Hayden; Announcer: Jeff Striegle	Backstretch: Dave Moody	Winston Kelley; Steve Post

== Standings after the race ==
Drivers' Championship standings

	Pos	Driver	Points
6	1	Joey Logano	5,000
4	2	Chase Elliott	5,000 (–0)
	3	Brad Keselowski	5,000 (–0)
2	4	Denny Hamlin	5,000 (–0)
4	5	Kevin Harvick	2,380 (–2,620)
1	6	Alex Bowman	2,346 (–2,654)
3	7	Martin Truex Jr.	2,314 (–2,686)
1	8	Kyle Busch	2,307 (–2,693)
1	9	Ryan Blaney	2,293 (–2,707)
1	10	Austin Dillon	2,258 (–2,742)
3	11	Kurt Busch	2,256 (–2,744)
1	12	Clint Bowyer	2,228 (–2,772)
1	13	William Byron	2,218 (–2,782)
	14	Matt DiBenedetto	2,217 (–2,783)
	15	Aric Almirola	2,211 (–2,789)
	16	Cole Custer	2,193 (–2,807)
Official driver's standings

Manufacturers' Championship standings

Pos	Manufacturer	Points
1	Ford	1,294
2	Toyota	1,225 (–69)
3	Chevrolet	1,192 (–102)

- Note: Only the first 16 positions are included for the driver standings.

Previous race: 2020 Autotrader EchoPark Automotive 500	NASCAR Cup Series; 2020 season	Next race: 2020 Season Finale 500
