= Jimmie Johnson =

American racing driver (born 1975)

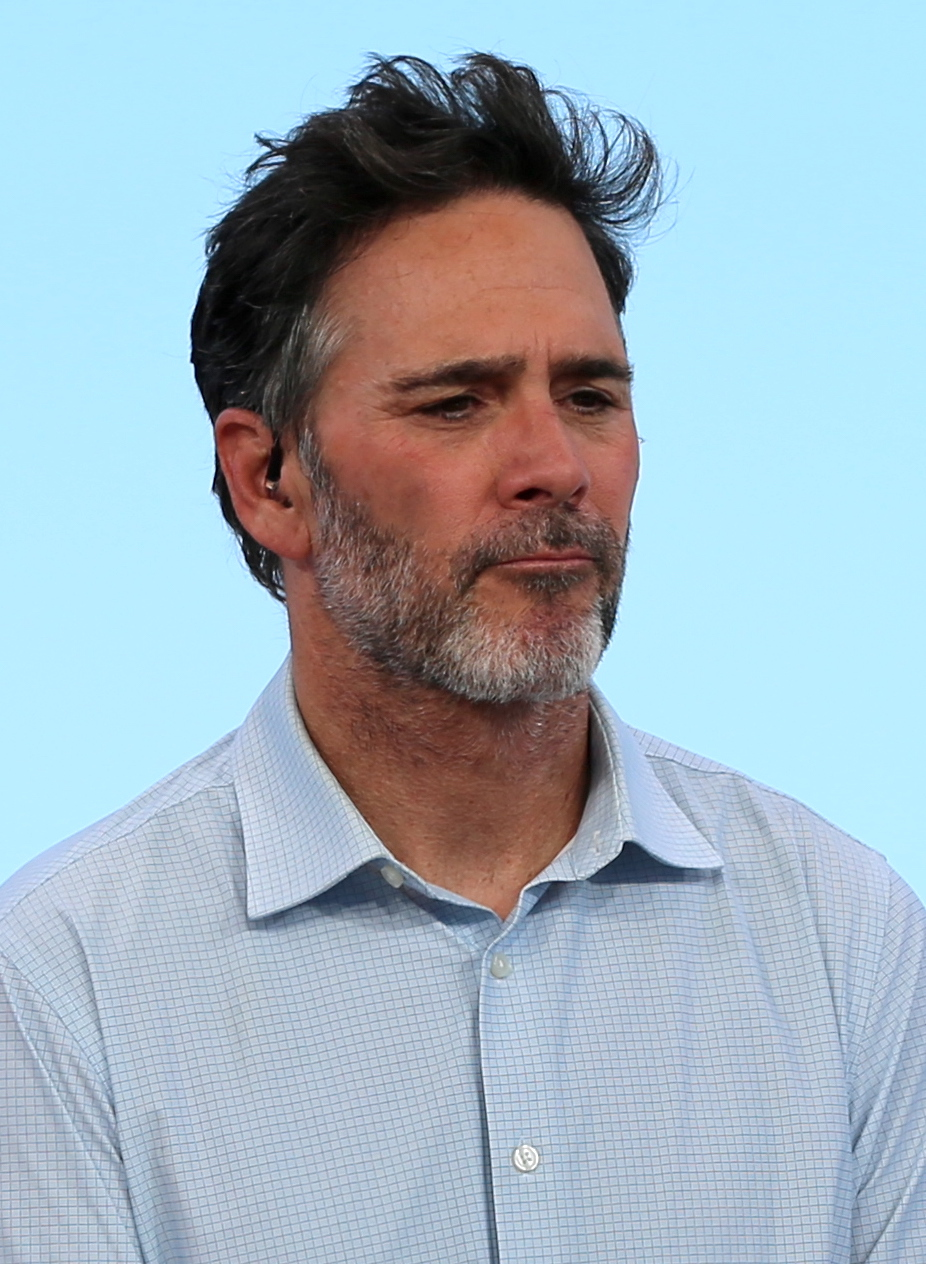
- Johnson at Sonoma Raceway in 2026
- Born: Jimmie Kenneth Johnson; September 17, 1975 (age 51); El Cajon, California, U.S.
- Achievements: 7× NASCAR Cup Series Champion (2006–2010, 2013, 2016); Tied with Richard Petty and Dale Earnhardt for the most NASCAR Cup Series Championships (7); 4× NASCAR All-Star Race Winner (2003, 2006, 2012, 2013); 2× Busch Clash Winner (2005, 2019); 2× Daytona 500 Winner (2006, 2013); 4× Coca-Cola 600 Winner (2003, 2004, 2005, 2014); 4× Brickyard 400 Winner (2006, 2008, 2009, 2012); 2× Southern 500 Winner (2004, 2012); 11 wins at Dover International Speedway (including 2 sweeps in 2002 and 2009); 9 wins at Martinsville Speedway (including a sweep in 2007, and 2006–2008, 2012, 2016 Chase race wins); 8 wins at Charlotte Motor Speedway (including sweeps in 2004 and 2005, and Chase race wins in 2004–2005, 2009, and 2016); 7 wins at Texas Motor Speedway (including a sweep in 2015, and 5 Chase race wins); 2010 Prelude to the Dream Winner; Six off-road racing championships Most consecutive NASCAR Cup Series Championships (5)
- Awards: 1998 ASA National Tour Rookie of the Year; 2009 Associated Press Male Athlete of the Year; 5× Driver of the Year (2006, 2007, 2009, 2010, 2013); 2020 Bill France Award of Excellence recipient 2022 Indianapolis 500 Rookie of the Year; Named one of NASCAR's 75 Greatest Drivers (2023); NASCAR Hall of Fame (2024); Inducted into the Motorsports Hall of Fame of America (2024)

NASCAR Cup Series career
- 702 races run over 23 years
- Car no., team: No. 84 (Legacy Motor Club)
- 2026 position: 39th
- Best finish: 1st (2006, 2007, 2008, 2009, 2010, 2013, 2016)
- First race: 2001 UAW-GM Quality 500 (Charlotte)
- Last race: 2026 Anduril 250 (San Diego)
- First win: 2002 NAPA Auto Parts 500 (California)
- Last win: 2017 AAA 400 Drive for Autism (Dover)
Wins	Top tens	Poles
83	375	36

NASCAR O'Reilly Auto Parts Series career
- 93 races run over 11 years
- Best finish: 8th (2001)
- First race: 1998 Kroger 200 (IRP)
- Last race: 2013 Dollar General 200 (Phoenix)
- First win: 2001 Sam's Club Presents the Hills Bros. Coffee 300 (Chicagoland)
Wins	Top tens	Poles
1	24	2

NASCAR FedEx Freight Truck Series career
- 2 races run over 2 years
- 2026 position: 119th
- Best finish: 104th (2008)
- First race: 2008 O'Reilly 200 (Bristol)
- Last race: 2026 Navy 250 (Coronado)
Wins	Top tens	Poles
0	0	0

IndyCar Series career
- 29 races run over 2 years
- 2022 position: 21st
- Best finish: 21st (2022)
- First race: 2021 Honda Indy Grand Prix of Alabama (Birmingham)
- Last race: 2022 Firestone Grand Prix of Monterey (Laguna Seca)
Wins	Podiums	Poles
0	0	0

24 Hours of Le Mans career
- Years: 2023
- Teams: Hendrick Motorsports
- Best finish: 39th (2023)
- Categorisation: FIA Platinum

- Statistics up to date as of November 8, 2026.

Jimmie Kenneth Johnson (born September 17, 1975) is an American professional stock car racing driver and team owner. He competes part-time in the NASCAR Cup Series, driving the No. 48 Toyota Camry XSE for Legacy Motor Club. Johnson has won seven Cup championships, including five consecutive titles, tying him with Richard Petty and Dale Earnhardt for the most all-time. He is widely considered one of the greatest drivers in NASCAR history.

Johnson was born in El Cajon, California and began racing motorcycles at the age of four. After graduating from Granite Hills High School, he competed in off-road series. He raced in Mickey Thompson Entertainment Group (MTEG), Short-course Off-road Drivers Association (SODA), and SCORE International, winning rookie of the year in each series. In 1998, Johnson and his team, Herzog Motorsports, began stock car racing. He moved to the national American Speed Association (ASA) series for late model touring cars and won another rookie of the year title. In 2000, he and Herzog moved their operations to the NASCAR Busch Series (now O'Reilly Auto Parts Series).

Johnson's talent was noticed by Hendrick Motorsports driver Jeff Gordon, who convinced owner Rick Hendrick to sign him in the Winston Cup Series full-time for 2002, with Gordon as a part-owner of his car. After finishing fifth in the points in his first full season, he was second in 2003 and 2004 and fifth in 2005. Johnson won his first Cup Series championship in 2006 and with further wins in 2007, 2008, 2009, and 2010, he became the first and only driver in NASCAR history to win five consecutive championships. Johnson finished sixth in the points standings in the 2011 season and third in 2012 before winning his sixth championship in 2013. In 2016, Johnson won his seventh championship, tying Richard Petty and Dale Earnhardt for the most Cup Series championships of all time. Johnson is also a two-time winner of the Daytona 500, winning in 2006 and 2013. Between 2002 and 2017, Johnson recorded seven championships, 83 career race wins, 222 top fives, 341 top tens, and 35 pole positions. From 2021 to 2022, Johnson competed in the IndyCar Series for Chip Ganassi Racing, and has competed occasionally in sports car racing throughout his career.

== Racing career ==
=== Beginnings ===
==== Off-road racing ====
Johnson started racing motorcycles in 1980 when he was four. Three years later, he won the 60cc class championship, despite injuring his knee. Afterward, he moved to the Mickey Thompson Entertainment Group (MTEG) Stadium Racing Series, where he won several more awards. In 1993, Johnson was given the opportunity to drive for Herb Fishel. He refused the deal and continued racing buggies and trucks in off-road stadium and desert races. He also reported for ESPN in the Short-course Off-road Drivers Association (SODA). Three years later, Johnson drove for Herzog Motorsports in the off-road truck series in 1996. By 1997, Johnson had progressed to SODA's Class 8; Class 8 is short-course off-road racing's class of two-wheel-drive Trophy Trucks which generate about 800 horsepower. He battled Scott Taylor and Brendan Gaughan for the championship. That year, Johnson won both races at Lake Geneva Raceway's first race weekend in May. He also won the season's third event at Antigo before finishing second to Gaughan at Antigo's second race. Johnson returned to Lake Geneva in July, winning the Saturday race and finishing second on the following day. Taylor ended up winning the championship with Gaughan second and Johnson third.

In SCORE, Johnson won races and had a few memorable finishes, like that in the 1995 Baja 1000, after leading over 900 miles, he fell asleep behind the wheel and woke up to find himself going off course. His Trophy Truck, Butch (the paint scheme of which was used for a throwback for Johnson's 48 car in the 2019 Southern 500, and the car that was used by Larry Ragland in wins such as the 1991 Baja 1000), was wrecked.

During his time in the SODA, SCORE, and MTEG series, Johnson accumulated over 25 wins, 100 top-three finishes, six championships, and received Rookie of the Year honors in all three leagues.

==== ASA and Busch Series ====
In 1997, Johnson began racing on asphalt ovals when he ran three races in the American Speed Association (ASA), making his debut at Hawkeye Downs Speedway. Driving for Herzog Motorsports' stock car program, he won the ASA Pat Schauer Memorial Rookie title in 1998. One year later, he had two wins and finished third in the standings. Johnson finished second in the two races at Fairgrounds Speedway he participated in over those two years.

Johnson made his NASCAR Busch Series (now NASCAR O'Reilly Auto Parts Series) debut at the 1998 Indianapolis Raceway Park event, where he finished 25th for ST Motorsports. He continued his limited slate in 1999 with Herzog Motorsports before moving to a full-time schedule in 2000. At Watkins Glen International, he had a spectacularly hard accident on lap 46 when his brakes failed entering the first turn. He had to swerve quickly to the right to avoid the No. 86 of Dennis Demers, but went into the grass on the inside of turn one, then went back across the track, caught some air on the gravel trap before finally crashing head-on into the Styrofoam barriers at the far end of the turn while still more than 150+ MPH. He eventually climbed out of the car unscathed and raised his fists in the air like he had won the race. Johnson noted he was "so happy to be alive and OK. The next couple of days I was really sore." Otherwise, in a rather uneventful season which featured one DNQ at Daytona and six top-tens, he finished tenth in the point standings.

In 2001, Johnson recorded one win at Chicagoland Speedway, and finished eighth in the point standings; his win at Chicagoland was his only win throughout his career at the track. During the year, he joined Hendrick Motorsports for a four-race schedule in the Winston Cup Series, making his series debut in the UAW-GM Quality 500 at Lowe's Motor Speedway. The opportunity was made available when he connected with Hendrick driver Jeff Gordon during the 2000 Busch season; with Herzog facing shutdown due to sponsorship issues, Johnson approached Gordon and was informed of the team's intention to field a fourth car for him.

Johnson formally moved to Hendrick in 2002, driving the No. 48 Lowe's-sponsored Chevrolet.

=== NASCAR Cup Series ===
==== 2002–2005 ====
Johnson began racing full-time in the Winston Cup Series during the 2002 season. He earned his first career pole position for the Daytona 500, becoming the third rookie to do so (the first were Loy Allen Jr. in 1994 and Mike Skinner in 1997). In his thirteenth career start, Johnson scored his first career win in the NAPA Auto Parts 500 at Auto Club Speedway. Johnson became the first rookie driver to lead the point standings and to win twice at the same track during a season, by sweeping both races at Dover. In the Coca-Cola 600, Johnson led 263 laps before he got a penalty for overshooting his pit box. He earned four pole positions and three wins (tying the rookie record set by Tony Stewart in 1999; later surpassed by Shane van Gisbergen, who won four times in 2025), as well as six top-fives and 21 top-tenfinishes. He finished fifth in the final point standings. However, despite the strong season, Ryan Newman won rookie of the year honors over Johnson, partially due to Newman having 22 Top 10's compared to Johnson's 21.

In 2003, Johnson finished ninth on the all-time list for consecutive weeks ranked in the top ten in points with 69. He won three races (Coca-Cola 600 at Charlotte and both New Hampshire races), two poles (at Kansas Speedway and Pocono Raceway), fourteen top-fives, and twenty top-ten finishes, including a second-place finish at Rockingham after leading 78 laps. He also was able to win the All-Star race for the first time, as well as finishing second in the final standings, ninety points behind Matt Kenseth and 207 ahead of his future teammate Dale Earnhardt Jr.

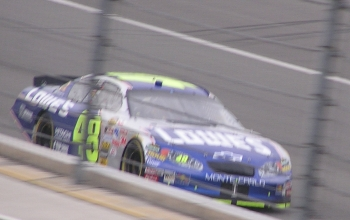
Johnson qualifying at Auto Club Speedway in 2005.

In 2004, Johnson started slowly at Rockingham Speedway and Las Vegas Motor Speedway with results of 41st and sixteenth, after a top-ten finish in the Daytona 500. However, he quickly was able to rebound, winning the Carolina Dodge Dealers 400 at Darlington Raceway. Subsequent victories in the Coca-Cola 600, the Pocono 500, and the Pennsylvania 500 came in the middle of the season, seeing Johnson sweep the Pocono races. However, finishes of 37th and 32nd at Talladega Superspeedway and Kansas moved him toward the bottom of the point standings. Afterward, he was able to win the UAW-GM Quality 500 at Lowe's Motor Speedway. The second victory of the 2004 Chase for the Nextel Cup, at the Subway 500 at Martinsville on October 24, 2004, was marred by tragedy. Owner Rick Hendrick's son Ricky, twin nieces, brother, and chief engine builder Randy Dorton, as well as Joe Turner, Scott Lathram, were killed in an airplane crash en route to the race. All eight passengers and both pilots died in the incident, and Johnson was told after the completion of the race. Johnson had a total of eight wins, twenty top-fives, and 23 top-ten finishes. At the end of the season, Johnson finished second in the point standings.

In 2005, Johnson won at Las Vegas, Lowe's Motor Speedway, Dover International Speedway, and then again at Lowe's. In total, Johnson had four consecutive wins at his sponsor's (Lowe's) sponsored track in Charlotte, North Carolina. He won the Coca-Cola 600 that year, which broke the record for the most yellow flags in a Cup Series race, by beating Bobby Labonte by .027 seconds. Johnson had a chance to win the championship coming into the November 20 season finale at Homestead-Miami Speedway, but finished fifth in points after crashing at the midway point of the event with a tire problem. He scored thirteen top-fives, 22 top-ten finishes, and one pole position.

==== 2006–2010: Championship streak ====
===== 2006 =====
In 2006, Johnson began the season by winning the Daytona 500. The Daytona 500 also marked his first race with Earl Barban as the spotter, who won five championships with Johnson and the No. 48 team. He finished second in the next race at California Speedway and won the UAW-DaimlerChrysler 400 at Las Vegas by passing Matt Kenseth on the last lap. Johnson won his third race of the season in the Aaron's 499 at Talladega, followed by two more victories at Indianapolis and Martinsville. One highlight of the season was when he saved the car from slamming into the wall when he spun out during qualifications at the first Dover race. Throughout the season, he became the only modern era driver to win at least three races in each of his first five seasons. He started the chase with unfortunate mishaps in the first four races; a DNF at New Hampshire, a pitting mistake at Dover, a penalty at Kansas (he led the most laps in the race), and, while trying to make a pass for first at Talladega, getting clipped and spinning out. He and the team kept their hopes up and rallied with five straight Top 2 finishes including a win at Martinsville to come back from eighth in the points standings to take the championship. At the end of the season, he recorded one pole, thirteen top-fives, 24 top-tens, and his first championship title (this was also the first in his NASCAR career). In December, Johnson won the 2006 Driver of the Year Award.

===== 2007 =====
During the 2007 season, Johnson continued on a streak and recorded ten wins, four poles, twenty top-fives, and again 24 top-ten finishes. Those ten wins included sweeping both races at Richmond, Atlanta, and Martinsville. He also won at Las Vegas, Auto Club, Texas, and Phoenix. Afterward, he won his second consecutive championship title and was named the 2007 Driver of the Year. Johnson also had the best average finish in the Chase with 5.0. At the end of the season, he had a total of 33 career wins, placing him eighteenth on the all-time wins list.

In December 2007, Johnson commenced a program of exercise sessions and a run schedule supervised by John Sitaras, in order to balance his strength. Sitaras' initial assessment found that half of his body was much tighter, having acclimated to offsetting the g-force load from turning left while driving. In two years, Johnson's body fat percentage dropped from 20% to 8% (visible also in the change of the shape of his face), while his strength and stamina greatly improved. Johnson later became the first racing driver to be named Associated Press Male Athlete of the Year (in 2009).

===== 2008 =====
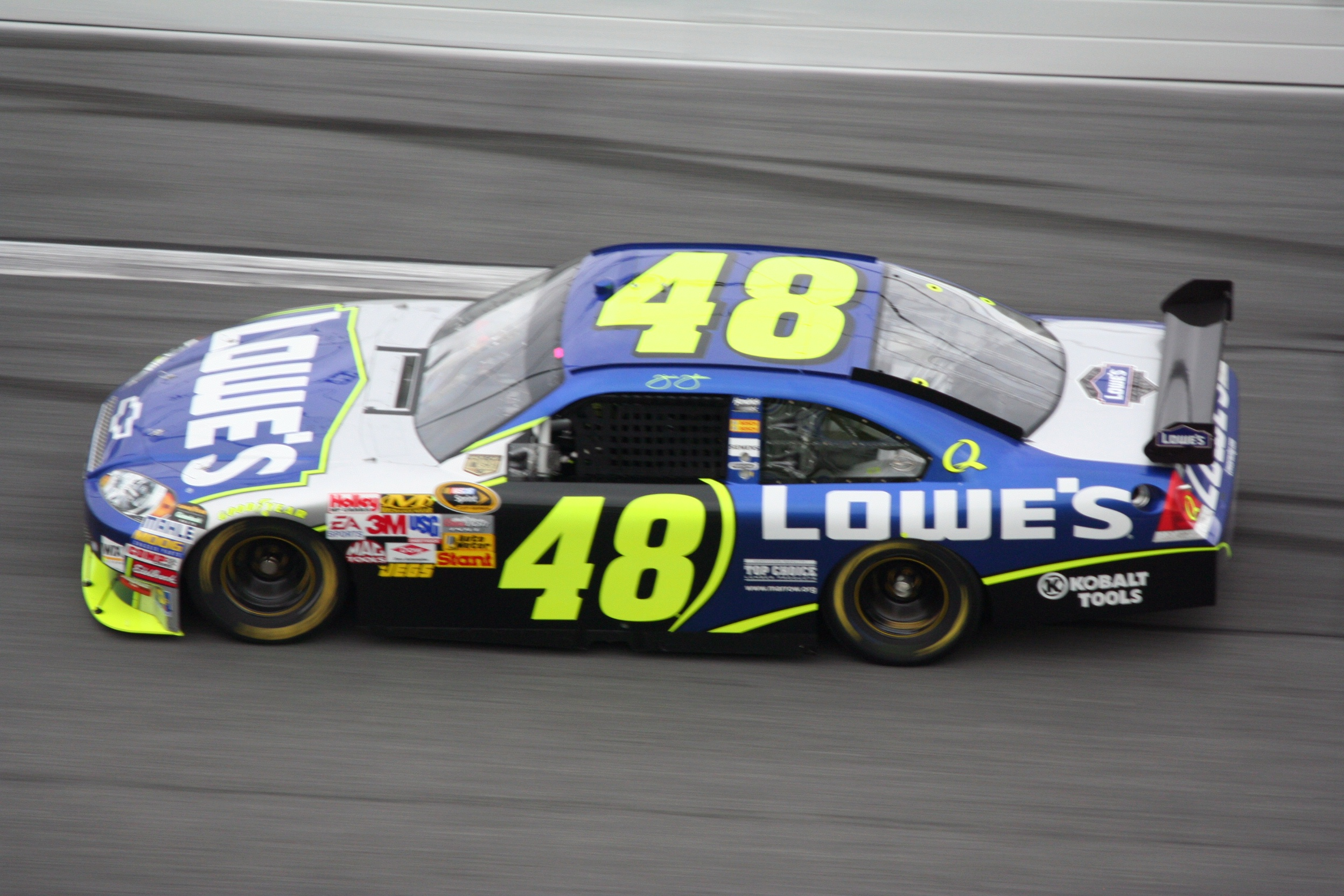
Jimmie Johnson racing in the 2008 Daytona 500

After the 2008 season, Johnson became the second driver to win three consecutive NASCAR Cup Series championships, the first being Cale Yarborough. During the season, he won seven races (including a sweep at Phoenix), a career-high of six poles, fifteen top-fives, and 22 top-tens. In five of those seven wins, he started from the pole. He became the only driver to record three wins in each of their first seven seasons. It was also during this year that Johnson raced in his first-ever NASCAR Craftsman Truck Series race, the O'Reilly 200 at Bristol, where he led 28 laps before spinning out on lap 101. That weekend was the first time he had ever sat in a racing truck. In the Chase for the Championship, he recorded fourteen wins, eight more than any other driver. One of those included Phoenix, in which he won on low fuel and high tire wear after crew chief Chad Knaus decided to stay out late in the race. He was also named the 2008 Driver of the Year and won an ESPY as the Best Driver. After the season, he also moved to third on the active winners' list.

===== 2009 =====
In the 2009 season, Johnson recorded his fourth consecutive championship, becoming the only driver to win four back-to-back season titles. Throughout this season, he won seven races (including a third consecutive Checker Auto Parts 500 and both Dover races), four poles, sixteen top-fives, and 24 top-ten finishes. Johnson now became the only driver to win at least three races in each of his first eight seasons, as well as the only driver to qualify for the Chase for the Championship every year since 2004. During the season, he moved up one spot to second on the active winners' list and went to thirteenth on the all-time wins list. After the season concluded, he won an ESPY for the second consecutive year and won the Driver of the Year award for the third time, tying Jeff Gordon, Mario Andretti, and Darrell Waltrip as the only three-time drivers to win the award.

===== 2010 =====
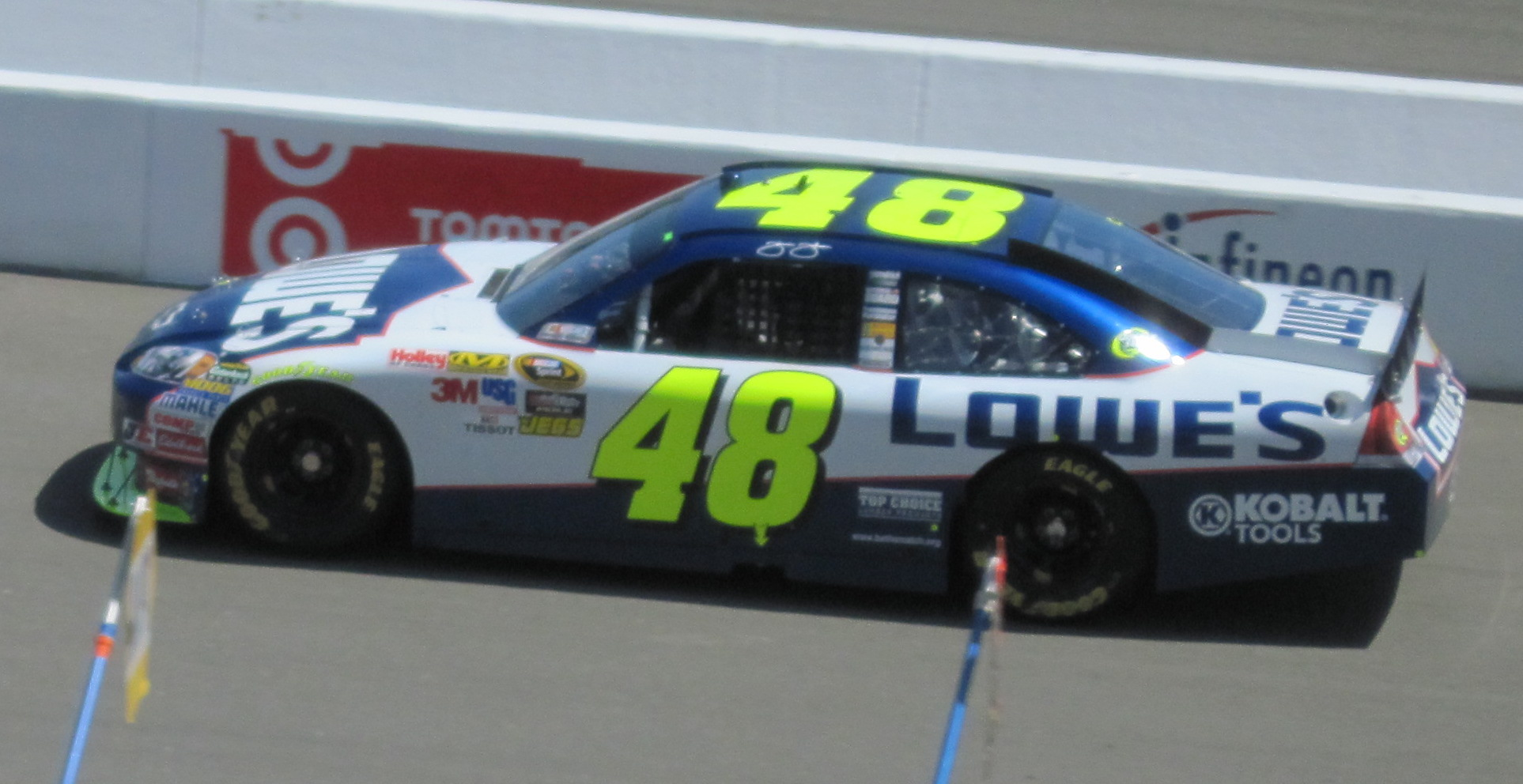
Johnson's 2010 Toyota/Save Mart 350 race-winning car

During 2010, Johnson won his fifth consecutive championship, becoming the third driver to make up points to win the title since 1975. During the season, he scored two poles, seventeen top-fives, 23 top-tens, and six wins. He also remained the only driver to qualify for the Chase every year since its inception in 2004. He became the twelfth driver to win 50+ NASCAR races when he won at Bristol in March and went up to tenth on the all-time wins list. His wins in 2010 included Auto Club, Las Vegas, where he passed Jeff Gordon with sixteen laps to go for the lead, Bristol, Sonoma, his first and only road course win, New Hampshire, and Dover. At New Hampshire, with eight laps remaining, Kurt Busch, who was running second, bumped Johnson to become the leader, but Johnson returned the favor a couple of laps later to lead the final two laps. Johnson said, "Kurt knocked me out of the way. At that point, I thought, I don't care if I win or finish. I'm going to run into him one way or the other ... I tried once and moved him. (I thought) I've got to hit him harder. The second time I did and moved him out of the way."

Johnson was also named Driver of the Year for the fourth time in his career, joining Gordon as the only drivers to win the award that many times. Johnson had been fighting for the championship with Denny Hamlin all season, but eventually passed him in points in the season finale at Homestead.

Johnson also won Tony Stewart's charity race, the Prelude to the Dream, his first victory on a dirt oval.

==== 2011 ====
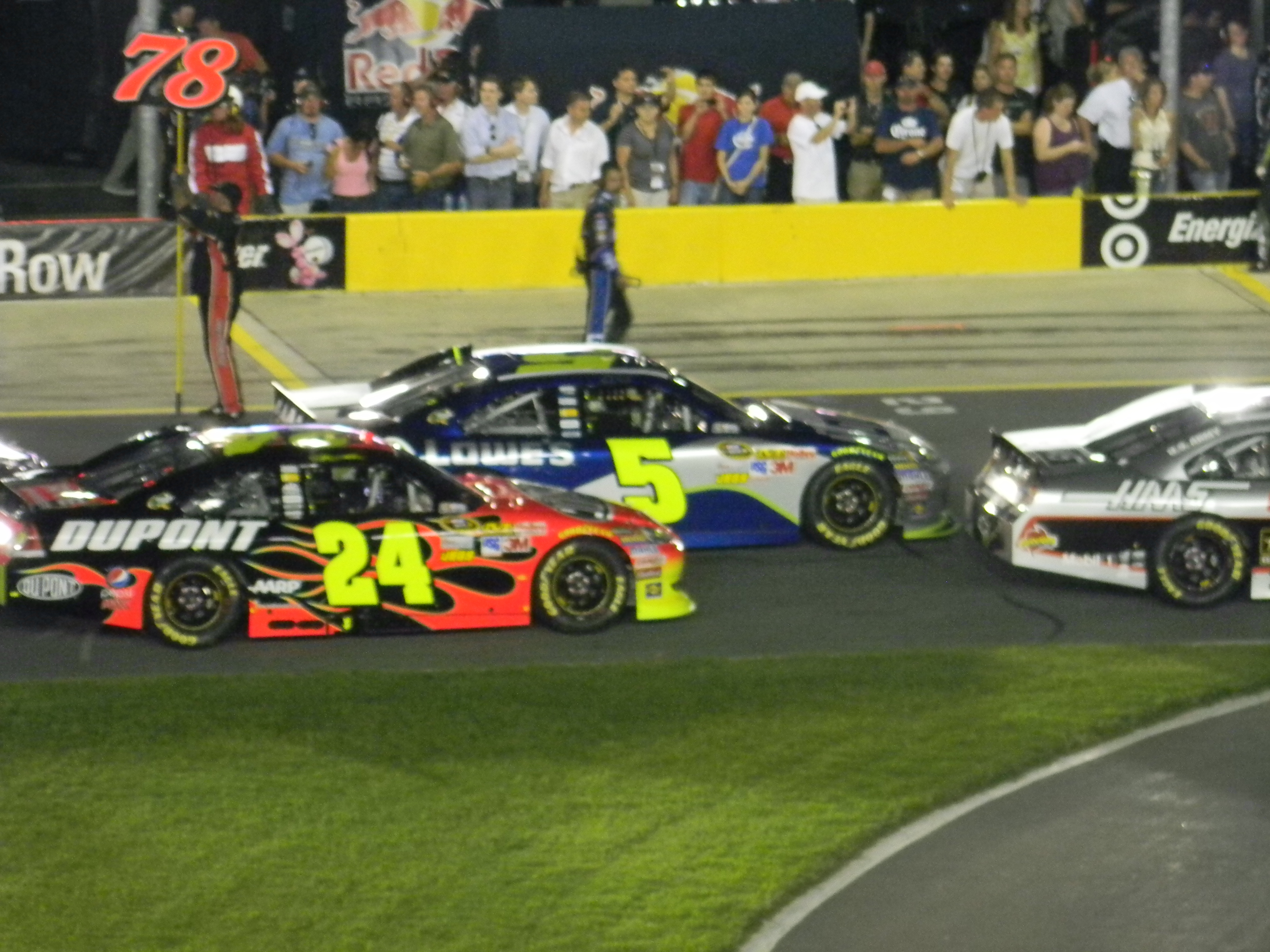
Johnson (No. 5) and Jeff Gordon during the 2011 All-Star Race

In 2011, Johnson began the season with a fourth-place finish in the Budweiser Shootout, after starting from the 23rd position. One week later in the 2011 Daytona 500, he started 23rd, but finished 27th after being involved in a crash on lap 29. During the Subway Fresh Fit 500, he managed a third-place finish. Following a sixteenth-place finish after the Kobalt Tools 400, he collected two consecutive top-five finishes.

Statistically, Johnson's 2011 season was one of his worst performances to date, even though he finished sixth in the points. He only won two races during the season. The first was the Aaron's 499 at Talladega Superspeedway, where Johnson started on the outside pole and tandem-drafted with Dale Earnhardt Jr. for the entire race. On the last lap, with Johnson in front, he and Earnhardt Jr. were in fifth and sixth off of turn 4, behind two other pairs of cars – their Hendrick teammates Jeff Gordon and Mark Martin, and the Richard Childress drafting pair of Clint Bowyer and Kevin Harvick. In the tri-oval, Earnhardt Jr. gave Johnson enough of a push to nip Bowyer at the finish line by 0.002 seconds. This was the closest recorded finish in Talladega history and tied the 2003 Carolina Dodge Dealers 400 for closest margin of victory in NASCAR history. After finishing in the first 15 positions in the next four races, Johnson failed to finish the Coca-Cola 600 after his engine failed. Three weeks later, in the Heluva Good! Sour Cream Dips 400, Johnson spun off turn two, flattening multiple tires, and breaking the sway bar which prompted him to a finish of 27th. During the Toyota/Save Mart 350, Johnson finished seventh after starting 12th on the grid. The finish moved Johnson to third in the Drivers' standings.

After returning to Daytona International Speedway for the Coke Zero 400, Johnson and Earnhardt Jr. ran together for most of the race, like at Talladega, until Johnson pitted under a caution flag. Johnson fell down the grid and was involved in a last-lap accident, prompting him to finish twentieth. During the next two races, Johnson finished third and fifth in the Quaker State 400 and the Lenox Industrial Tools 301. Two weeks later, Johnson found himself finishing nineteenth during the Brickyard 400 after coming to pit road with thirty laps remaining in the event. Johnson finished fourth in the Good Sam RV Insurance 500, after bumping Kurt Busch on the final lap. In the next race, Johnson finished tenth. Johnson finished in the top five in the following three races. During the last race of the regular season, the Wonderful Pistachios 400, Johnson finished in the 31st position. While at Chicagoland Speedway for the GEICO 400, Johnson finished tenth. Afterward, Johnson finished eighteenth in the Sylvania 300, then second in the AAA 400. One week later, Johnson recorded his second victory of the season in the Hollywood Casino 400. During the Bank of America 500, Johnson was involved in a crash and finished 34th. In the following race, Johnson finished second. For the next two races, Johnson finished fourteenth in each and finished 32nd in the Ford 400 to finish sixth in the Driver's championship standings.

The third NASCAR Championship for Tony Stewart marked the first time since 2005 (coincidentally, Stewart's second) that someone other than Johnson was the champion.

==== 2012 ====
Johnson began the 2012 season with a 14th-place finish in the Budweiser Shootout after crashing on lap 74. During the Daytona 500, Johnson was involved in a crash on lap two when he turned into the wall after contact from Elliott Sadler, then was t-boned by David Ragan, also collecting Danica Patrick, Kurt Busch and Trevor Bayne. Damage to the car was severe, prompting him to retire and finish 42nd. Afterward, he finished fourth and second in the Subway Fresh Fit 500 and Kobalt Tools 400. While at Bristol Motor Speedway for the Food City 500, Johnson finished in the ninth position, moving him up to 11th in the Drivers' Standings. Next, Johnson finished tenth in the Auto Club 400, despite having an oil leak, but the rain saved Johnson from a low finish. He went on to finish twelfth in the spring event at Martinsville after being involved in a crash on the first green-white-checker attempt. In the following event, the Samsung Mobile 500, Johnson finished second after leading much of the race before he was passed by Greg Biffle. Afterward, he recorded a third-place finish in the STP 400 at Kansas on April 22, 2012, and a sixth-place finish in the Capital City 400 at Richmond one week later. On May 6, 2012, Johnson started nnieteenth in the Aaron's 499 at Talladega, but finished 35th after suffering a broken oil pump belt on lap 62.

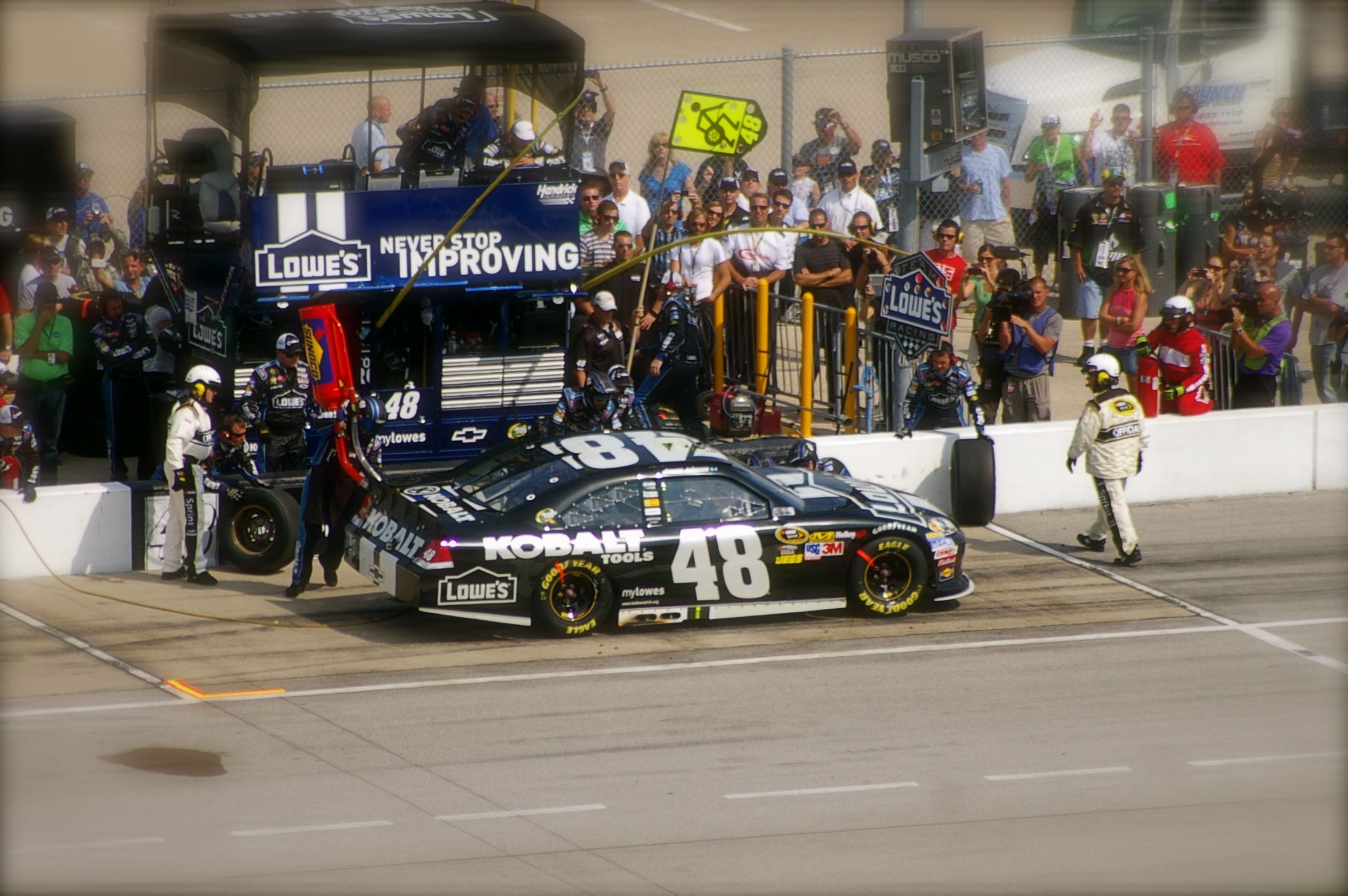
Johnson pits his car in 2012

Johnson won his first race of the season one week later in the Bojangles' Southern 500 at Darlington. The win was also Rick Hendrick's 200th NASCAR Cup Series win. A week later, he matched Gordon and Dale Earnhardt with three wins in the NASCAR Sprint All-Star Race after winning the 2012 NASCAR Sprint All-Star Race. Next, in the Coca-Cola 600, Johnson finished eleventh in the race after a penalty on lap 354. After the Coca-Cola 600, Johnson went on to win his second race of the season in the FedEx 400. In the Pocono 400, he recorded a fourth-place finish after starting 24th on the grid. During the next two races, Johnson placed fifth, moving him to fourth in the standings. Afterward, Johnson finished sixth after winning his first pole position of the season in the Quaker State 400. However, in the Coke Zero 400, Johnson finished 36th after retiring from a crash on lap 124. After finishing seventh during the Lenox Industrial Tools 301, Johnson recorded his third victory of the season and his fourth career win at the Indianapolis Motor Speedway, tying Jeff Gordon for what was the record for the most wins in the Brickyard 400.

At Michigan, Johnson was leading late in the race with six laps to go when his engine blew up, giving the race to Greg Biffle.

After making the NASCAR Chase for the Championship, Johnson secured three straight top-five finishes in the GEICO 400, Sylvania 300 and AAA 400. Following a seventeenth-place finish in Good Sam Roadside Assistance 500, Johnson recorded four top-ten finishes, including two consecutive wins from the pole position at Martinsville and Texas, which was his sixtieth win in the series, to take a seven-point lead over Brad Keselowski. Johnson was able to hold off Keselowski's hard racing, which even prompted Tony Stewart to say that he was driving with a "death wish". At Phoenix, Johnson blew a right front tire, which caused him to collide into the wall and finish in the 32nd position. He was racing for the win and the championship the following week at Homestead, but his chances of winning the championship were over after he had a pit road penalty and had a gear failure and he finished 36th in that race, and finished third in the Drivers Championship behind Keselowski and Bowyer.

==== 2013: Return to championship form ====
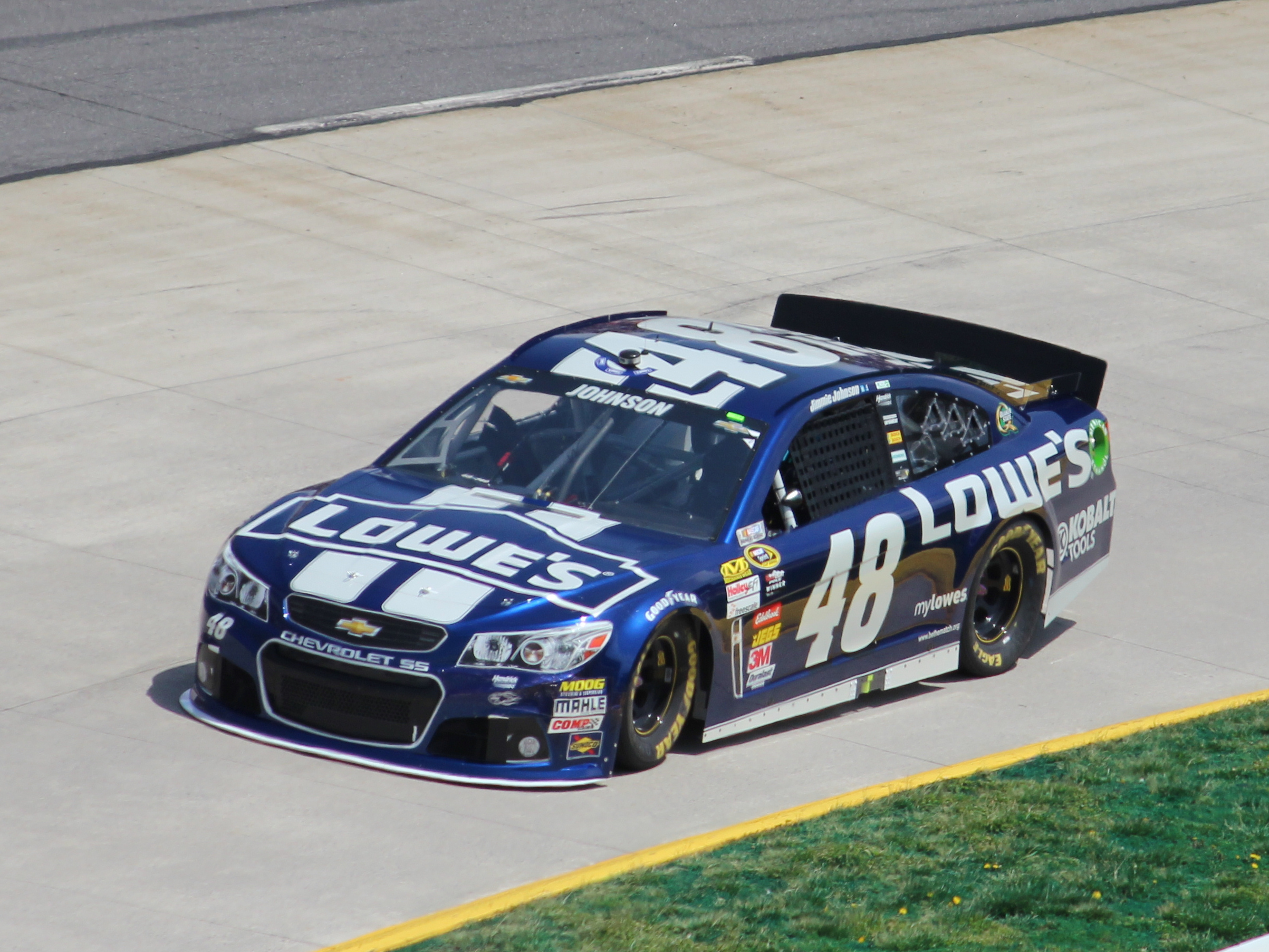
Johnson racing during the 2013 STP Gas Booster 500

In 2013, Johnson began his season with a fourteenth-place finish in the 2013 Sprint Unlimited when he crashed on lap 14 along with Kyle Busch, Kurt Busch, Mark Martin, Jeff Gordon, and Denny Hamlin. Afterward, he placed fourth in the first Budweiser Duel, resulting in a ninth-place starting position in the 2013 Daytona 500. In the Daytona 500, Johnson started well, assuming the lead from Jeff Gordon on lap 32 and leading a handful of laps before falling back to the middle of the pack. Over the last few laps, Johnson was racing alongside Brad Keselowski for the lead until a caution came out for debris. Johnson took advantage of leading on the last restart. With five laps to go, Johnson led a lane with Greg Biffle and Danica Patrick. He then held off a last-lap charge from Dale Earnhardt Jr. and Mark Martin to win his second Daytona 500. This was Johnson's first Daytona 500 win with Knaus, as he won the 2006 race with Darian Grubb as Knaus was serving a five-race suspension. It was also the first time since his 2006 win that he finished better than 27th in the Daytona 500, after a streak of six years where he had never finished better than 27th because of crashes and mechanical failures.

The following week at Phoenix, Johnson started inside the top ten and finished second behind Carl Edwards. He followed this with a sixth-place finish at Las Vegas. At Bristol, he was running on the lead lap until a late-race spin forced him back to a 22nd-place finish. At Fontana, he struggled for most of the race, racing near the back of the pack, but salvaged a twelfth-place finish. Johnson won his first pole position of the season at Martinsville and had the dominant car, leading 346 of 500 laps on the way to his eighth Martinsville race win. Johnson also assumed the point lead, which he held for the remainder of the regular season. Johnson's consistency was enough that there were points in the summer where he was more than a full two-race wins' worth of points ahead of Carl Edwards or Clint Bowyer. Afterward, Johnson finished sixth at Texas. At Kansas, he led nine laps and finished third behind Matt Kenseth and Kasey Kahne. Johnson finished 12th the following week at Richmond, allowing him to build even further on his point lead. At Talladega, he was the only driver besides Matt Kenseth to lead double-digit laps (sixteen) and finished in fifth place. A fourth-place finish the following week at Darlington allowed Johnson to further solidify his point lead over Edwards.

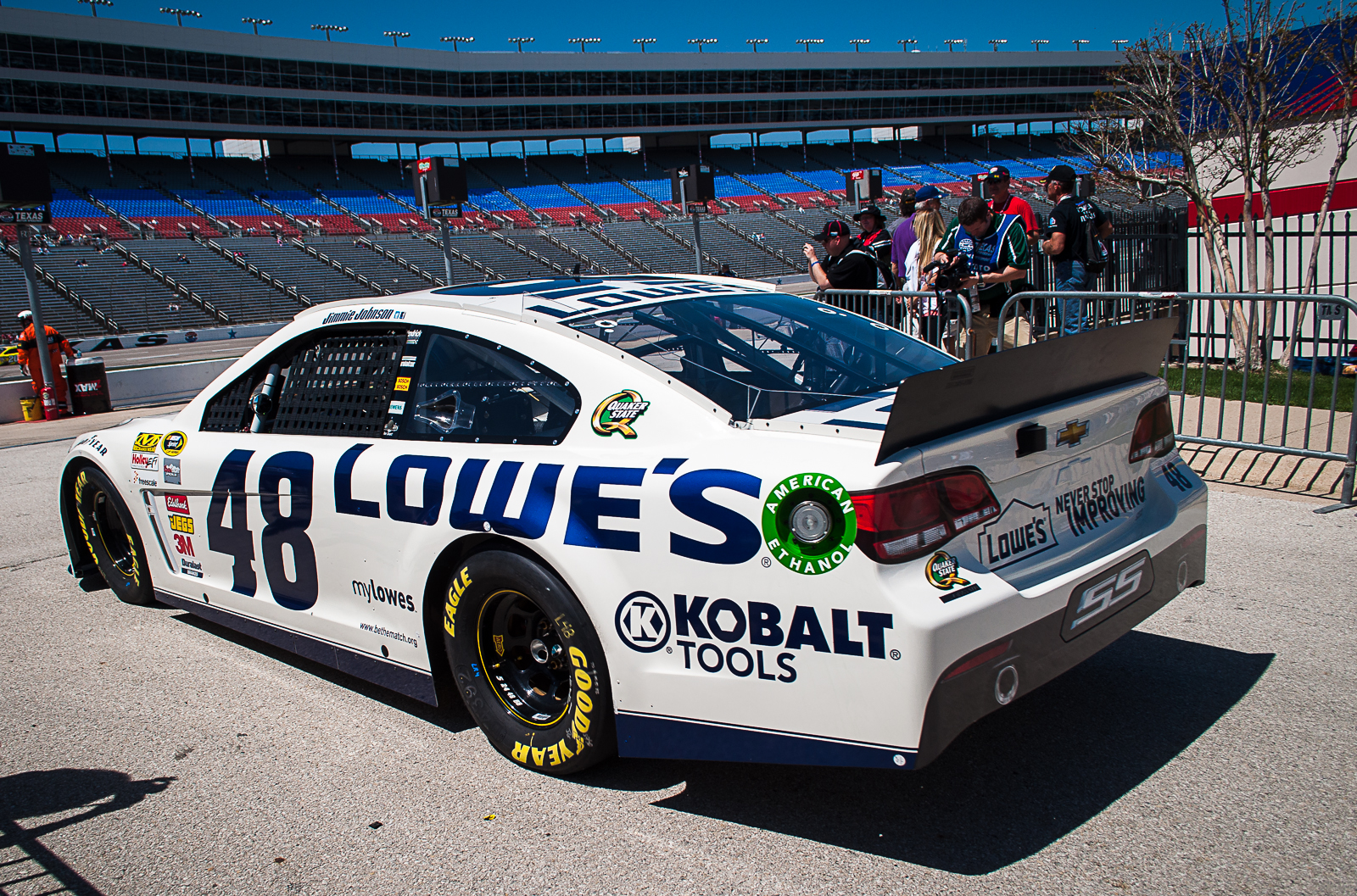
Johnson during practice for the 2013 NRA 500

In the 2013 NASCAR Sprint All-Star Race, Johnson won his record fourth All-Star race after a fast pit stop allowed him to start the final ten-lap sprint in second, and later passed Kasey Kahne for the victory. One week later, Johnson finished 22nd after spinning sideways late in the race. At Dover, Johnson led 143 laps but finished 17th when he jumped Juan Pablo Montoya on the last restart, causing NASCAR to issue him a penalty. He was able to redeem himself for this mistake the following week at Pocono by earning the pole position, leading the most laps, and winning his third race of the season, which increased his point lead to 51 points over Edwards. This also snapped a nine-year winless streak for Johnson at Pocono since sweeping both of the track's 2004 NASCAR Cup Series races. At the Quicken Loans 400 at Michigan, Johnson closed in on Greg Biffle for the lead with less than 10 laps left, but suffered a flat tire with less than five laps to go. Johnson finished the race in 28th, his worst finish of the season to that point. Johnson then finished ninth at Sonoma. At Kentucky, Johnson started third. He had the dominant car of the race, leading 182 of 267 laps. However, on a restart on lap 246, Johnson was slow to get up to speed and was subsequently touched and spun by Joey Logano, costing Johnson a shot at the win and giving the race to Matt Kenseth. Johnson was able to charge through the field after the caution and restart to salvage a ninth-place finish.

Returning to Daytona for the Coke Zero 400, Johnson led 94 laps and held off Tony Stewart and Kevin Harvick on a green-white-checker finish to win his fourth race of the year. In winning the race, Johnson became the first driver since Bobby Allison in 1982 to sweep both Daytona races in a season. This was a significant improvement in Johnson's runs on the restrictor plate tracks, as he had been crashed out of the running at both Daytona races in 2012, had an engine failure early while leading at Talladega in the spring and was part of a crash on the last lap in the fall. Also, he was one of only three drivers to sweep the top ten, the other two drivers being Ryan Newman and Dale Earnhardt Jr.

At New Hampshire for the Camping World RV Sales 301, Johnson qualified second, but failed post-qualifying inspection after his car was found to be too low, and started the race in 43rd, the first time in his career he started dead last. In the race, Johnson passed seven cars in the first four laps and reached the Top 20 by lap 50, while reaching the top ten by lap 165; Johnson finished sixth. He almost won the pole position at Indianapolis but was bumped to second by Ryan Newman. Johnson led the most laps and almost won, but a slow final pit stop cost him the race to Newman. The following week at Pocono, Johnson won another pole position, setting another track qualifying record. He led 43 of the first 80 laps before he cut a right-front tire that knocked a spark plug loose and affected the handling of the car. Johnson's pit crew worked hard to repair the car, fixing the plug on the last pit stop, and managing to salvage a thirteenth-place finish after racing near the back of the pack for most of the race.

Returning to Michigan, Johnson qualified third but crashed in happy hour, forcing him to a backup car and a 43rd starting spot. After running up to the lead through pit stop strategy, Johnson lost an engine on lap 55, relegating him to a 40th-place finish. This was followed by a streak of three poor finishes of 36th at Bristol, 28th at Atlanta, and 40th at Richmond due to crashes and mechanical failures.

Johnson started the Chase seeded in second place. He started the Chase with a fifth-place finish at Chicago, followed by a fourth-place finish at New Hampshire. At Dover, Johnson led 243 laps and held off Dale Earnhardt Jr. over the last 25 laps to win his eighth race at the track, also redeeming himself for the restart line violation that had cost him a shot at winning the June race.

Johnson spent the next several races chasing Matt Kenseth for the points lead, eventually gaining it at Talladega, though losing it when he and Kenseth tied for the points lead at Martinsville. Returning to Texas, Johnson had the dominant car, leading 255 laps to his sixth win of the season. The following weekend at Phoenix, Johnson avoided trouble in tight racing on two separate occasions (a near scrape in turn 4 on the first lap, and later a near spin after contact with Carl Edwards in turn 1) to escape with a third-place finish. He also capitalized on Kenseth's suffering from a poorly-handling car. With Kenseth finishing 23rd, Johnson took a 28-point lead to the season finale at Homestead-Miami Speedway. In the finale, Johnson raced conservatively to a ninth-place finish to secure his sixth title. He closed out the season with six wins, three poles, sixteen top-fives, and 24 top-tens, with an average finish of 9.8 and an average start of 10.7.

==== 2014 ====
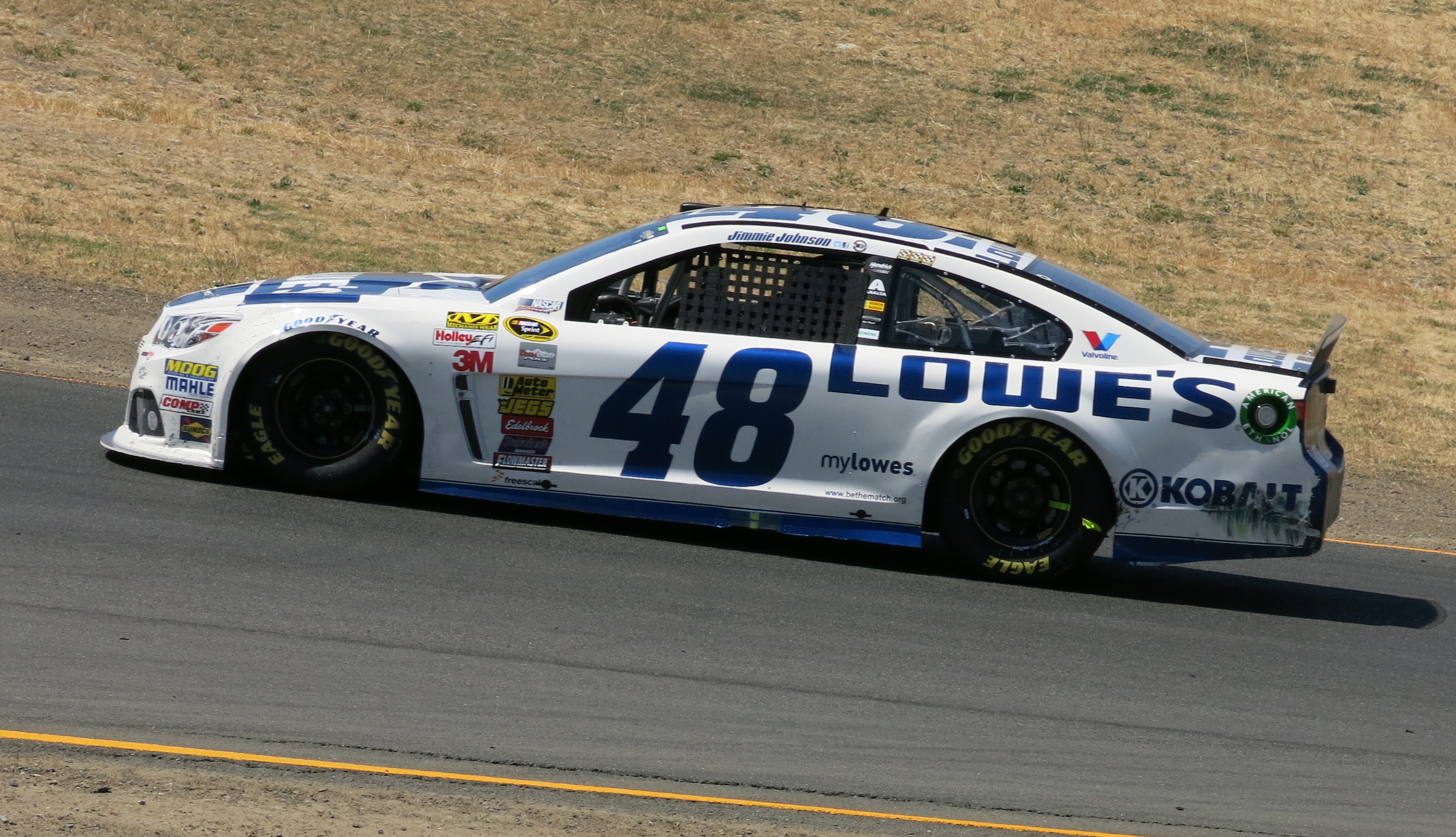
Johnson racing during the 2014 Toyota/Save Mart 350

Statistically, 2014 was one of Johnson's worst seasons to date. He started the season on an up-and-down note but went winless through the first eleven races of the 2014 season (his best finish was second at Martinsville). Skepticism began to arise, as he had never gone more than twelve races into a season without a win, and hadn't gone that long since the first few years of his Cup career. However, Johnson won the Coca-Cola 600, his first win in the race since 2005. Afterward, he went on to win at Dover the following week, making it the thirteenth time he had back-to-back wins.

A few weeks later, Johnson recorded his first win at Michigan, after several years of being deprived of a shot at victory as a result of running out of gas or blowing an engine. However, he didn't keep up with the momentum. After finishing in the top ten at Sonoma and Kentucky, Johnson was collected in an early wreck in the Coke Zero 400, finishing 42nd. Johnson's streak of misfortune continued the next several weeks, finishing 42nd for the second week in a row at New Hampshire. This was followed up by an inconsistent run at Indy (fourteenth), and poor showings resulting from accidents at Pocono (39th) and Watkins Glen (28th). Despite the poor finishes, Johnson qualified fourth for the Chase.

In the Chase, Johnson finished twelfth at Chicagoland, fifth at New Hampshire, and third at Dover to advance to the Contender Round. However, trouble struck when he finished 40th and seventeenth in the next two races.

At Talladega, Johnson started second and led a high of 84 laps. However, a 24th-place finish kept him from advancing to the Eliminator Round. At Martinsville, Johnson started seventh but finished 39th after being involved in a crash early in the race. Returning to Texas, Johnson dominated and held off Brad Keselowski, Kevin Harvick (and Jeff Gordon, who cut a tire on contact with Brad Keselowski late in the race which led to a post-race brawl) to score his third straight win in the fall Texas race, and also ended an eighteen-race winless streak. At Phoenix, he struggled for most of the day and finished 38th after blowing a tire and crashing out. At the season finale at Homestead, Johnson finished ninth and closed out finishing eleventh in points. This marked the first time in Johnson's NASCAR Cup career that he had finished outside of the top ten in the final points.

==== 2015 ====
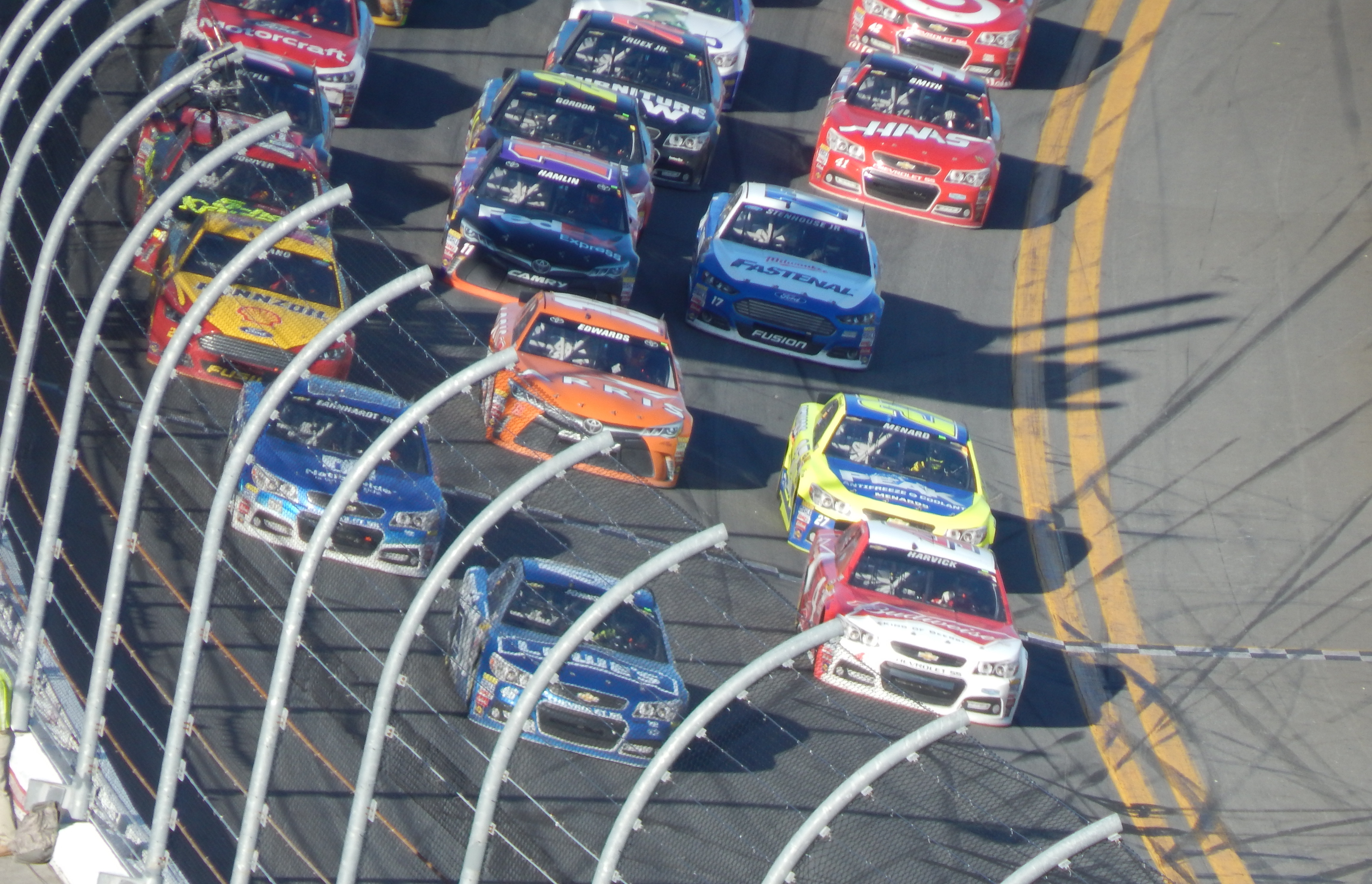
Johnson leading the 2015 Daytona 500.

Johnson began his season with a win in the Budweiser Duel. He started the season by finishing fifth in the Daytona 500 for the second year in a row. The following week, he won the Folds of Honor QuikTrip 500 at Atlanta.

At Las Vegas, Johnson crashed twice into the outside wall, leaving him with a 41st-place finish. He rebounded with an eleventh-place finish in Phoenix and a ninth-place finish at California, his first top-ten there in two years. At Martinsville, he struggled to a 35th-place finish. However, his momentum returned at Texas when he held off Kevin Harvick and Dale Earnhardt Jr. to win. At Bristol, he avoided tight trouble early in the race and came home second to polesitter Matt Kenseth. At Richmond, he finished third. These finishes moved him back up to fourth in the standings. At Talladega, Johnson started fifth and led fifty laps, only to finish second to Earnhardt Jr.

At Kansas, Johnson gambled by staying out on the last round of pit stops and held off Harvick and Earnhardt again to win his third race at Kansas and of the season. In winning, he established a Cup record of 23 wins on 1.5-mile tracks, taking what was both his 200th top-five and his 300th top-ten finish. At Charlotte, he spun out on two occasions. The first time was early in the race while running 16th coming out of turn 4, but he was lucky to avoid hitting anything. He wasn't so lucky on the second spin late in the race; while running fifth, he spun out again at the same place, and hit the wall in pit road, causing some nose damage. Those spin-outs left him with a 40th-place finish. He rebounded the following week with a win at Dover, and also became one of four drivers to have won ten or more races at one track. This gave him a total of 74 career wins, two fewer than Dale Earnhardt's 76.

At Pocono, Johnson cut a tire on lap 88 but did not take major damage. He was able to work his way through the field to finish in third place. He finished nineteenth at Michigan after the race was called for rain on lap 138. At Sonoma, Johnson led the most laps at 45 laps, but a late-race caution caused by Casey Mears' broken wheel axle cost him, and he was passed by Kyle Busch with five laps to go and slipped back to sixth place.

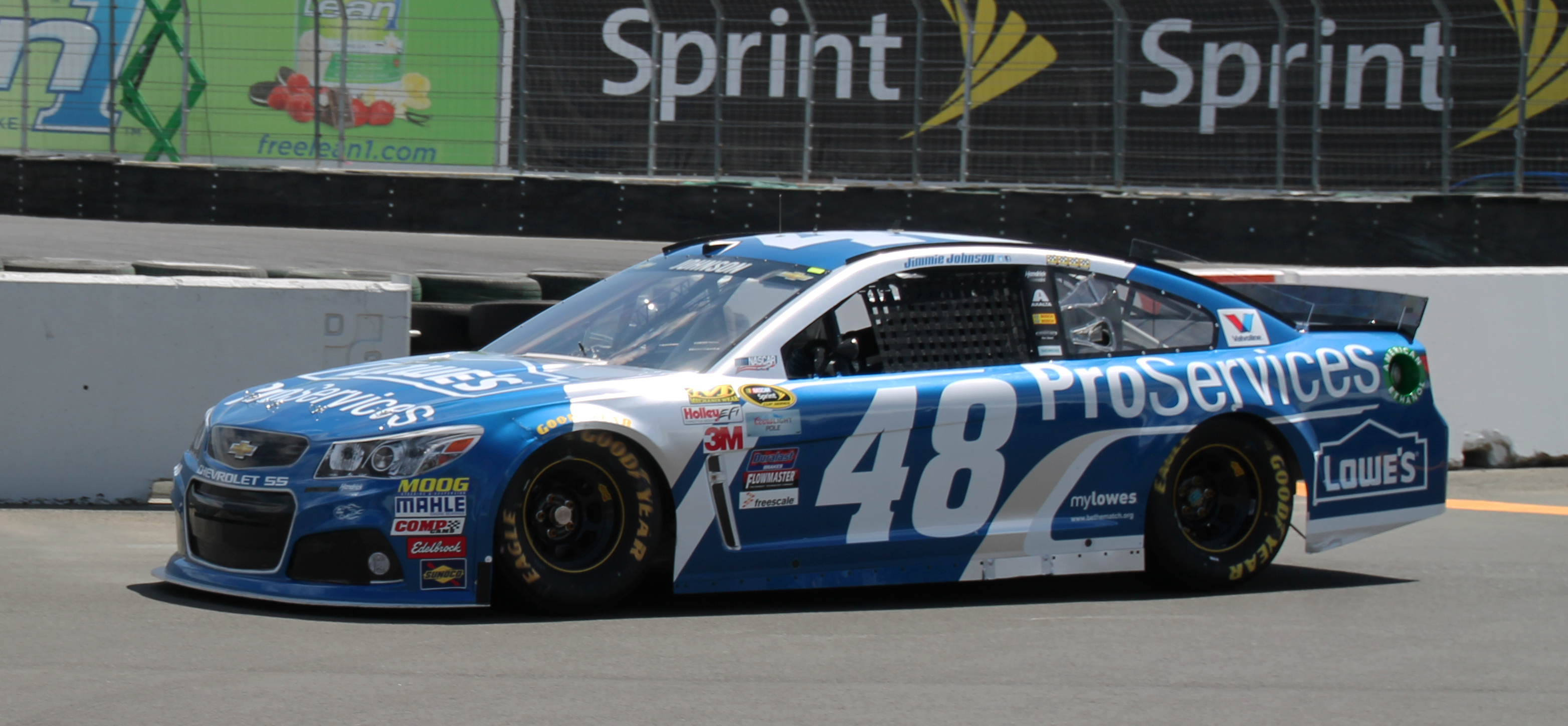
Johnson during 2015 Toyota/Save Mart 350 qualifying

Returning to Daytona, Johnson started 12th and led 35 laps before finishing second to Dale Earnhardt Jr., in a repeat of the Talladega race. At Kentucky, Johnson started sixth and ran inside the top-ten for most of the night, finishing ninth. At the second stop in Pocono, Johnson, along with two of his Hendrick teammates, Jeff Gordon and Dale Earnhardt Jr., took advantage of several cars running out of fuel to finish in the top six (Gordon finished third, Dale Jr. took fourth, and Johnson grabbed sixth). At Watkins Glen, despite suffering two penalties (lap 3: Overshooting the entrance to the inner loop, and caution No. 1 (lap 26–28): Speeding through pit road), Johnson rallied to finish tenth. He wasn't so lucky at Michigan, as late in the race, he got loose and spun in turn 3, and damaged the splitter on his car, resulting in a 39th-place finish (ten laps down). He rebounded at Bristol by finishing fourth, but had bad luck once more at Darlington. He spun out on lap 134 in turn 4, bringing out the seventh caution, and was never a real threat. He ended up nineteenth. He was able to recover a bit for a ninth-place finish at Richmond and started first in the Chase in a three-way tie between him, Kyle Busch, and Matt Kenseth.

Johnson opened up the Chase in a rough way. At Chicagoland, he blew a left front tire early in the race but was able to charge through the field to salvage an eleventh-place finish. He was also the subject of controversy when he made contact with Kevin Harvick on a three-wide pass that led to Harvick cutting a left rear tire, leaving Harvick with a 42nd-place finish.

At Loudon, Johnson finished sixth after blowing a tire in the third position. At Dover, his Chase hopes came to an end when his car broke a driveline, leading him to finish 36 laps down in 41st place. At the fall race at Texas, Johnson won, passing Brad Keselowski with four laps to go. This marked his fourth consecutive win in the fall race, and third consecutive win on that track, having also won the spring race. That victory also marked the 75th of his NASCAR Cup Series career, putting him one race win short of tying Dale Earnhardt's career wins. Also in the process, he snapped a twenty-race winless streak.

Johnson finished fifth at Phoenix, and for the third year in a row, he finished ninth at Homestead. Also in the process, he edged out Ryan Newman by one point to finish tenth in the final standings. With the retirement of his teammate and mentor, Jeff Gordon, Johnson assumed the active wins record with 75.

==== 2016: The seventh title ====
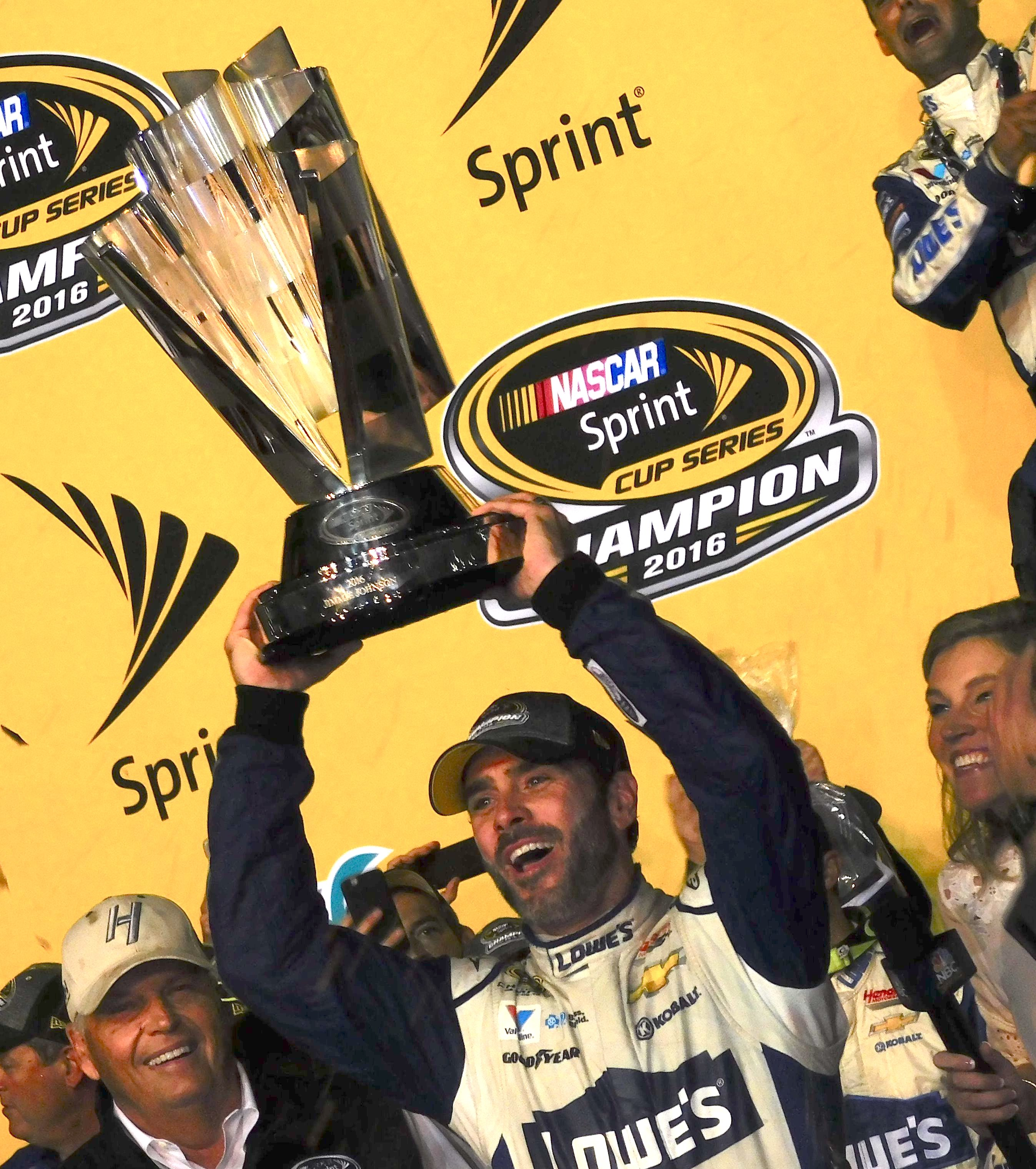
Johnson after winning the 2016 NASCAR Sprint Cup Series Championship

Johnson began the 2016 season with a sixteenth-place finish at the Daytona 500. In the next race at Atlanta Motor Speedway, he won his first race of the season and the 76th of his career, tying Dale Earnhardt for seventh on the all-time wins list. Johnson finished third and eleventh in the next two events of the season at Las Vegas and Phoenix. His second victory of the season came in the fifth race, the Auto Club 400, where Johnson passed Harvick in an overtime finish. It was also the first time since 2011 that he finished in the top-five at the Auto Club Speedway. In the STP 500 at Martinsville Speedway, Johnson recorded a ninth-place finish after moving through the field after qualifying 24th. One week later, Johnson finished fourth in the Duck Commander 500 at Texas Motor Speedway despite suffering minor damage during a thirteen-car accident that occurred within fifty laps of the finish.

In the Food City 500 at Bristol, Johnson finished 23rd after making an unscheduled pit stop due to a loose lug nut on lap 300. At Richmond, he led 44 laps early in the race and finished third. At Talladega, Johnson was spun by Paul Menard and got involved in a multi-car accident with 28 laps to go, finishing 22nd. Johnson's streak of misfortune continued through the next several months, crashing out at Dover, Pocono, Daytona, Kentucky and at Watkins Glen, where he finished last for the first time in his career. His Top 10 finishes during the period came only in the Coca-Cola 600 and Brickyard 400, where he finished third in both races. Johnson finished seventh and sixth at Bristol and Michigan the following two weeks, but finished 33rd at Darlington after he spun out of turn 4. Johnson then finished 11th at Richmond. He qualified eighth for the Chase.

Johnson began the Chase for the Championship by leading a race-high 118 laps at Chicagoland, but received a speeding penalty during a green flag pit stop late in the race, and ultimately finished 12th. Johnson finished eighth the following week at Loudon. At Dover, Johnson led 90 laps but once again received a pit road penalty with 105 laps to go, costing him a win. He charged through the field and finished seventh (1st car a lap down) and moved to the "Round of 12" of the Chase.

At Charlotte, Johnson led a race-high 155 laps and won the Bank of America 500, claiming his eighth win at the track and the third win of the season, also snapping his 24-race winless streak. This marked Johnson's first appearance in the "Round of 8" under the current Chase system. He then finished 4th at Kansas and 23rd at Talladega. At Martinsville, Denny Hamlin aggressively made contact with Johnson on lap 198 and had a tire rub to cause a caution, but was able to stay on the lead lap. Later, during a caution on lap 362, he lost fuel pressure but was able to get the car refired and stayed on the lead lap again. After the restart, he took the lead from Hamlin and led the final 92 laps to win the Goody's Fast Relief 500. This locked him into the Championship 4 for the final race at Homestead. Johnson finished eleventh in the rain-shortened race at Texas, and 38th at Phoenix after being penalized a lap for passing the pace car coming down to pit road and being involved in a wreck on a restart.

Johnson claimed his seventh championship by winning at Homestead on November 20. After losing his starting spot due to a pre-race inspection fault, Johnson started at the rear of the field. He progressed through the field, cracking the Top 10 quickly, but remained stagnant around fifth-place for a majority of the race. On a restart with ten laps to go, Carl Edwards came across the nose of Joey Logano, hit the inside wall, and triggered a massive wreck, ending Edwards' championship hopes. Johnson avoided the accident and was put in a position to win the title. On the final restart, he passed Kyle Larson, winning the race and his seventh championship, tying Richard Petty and Dale Earnhardt for the most all-time championships.

==== 2017: Final NASCAR wins ====
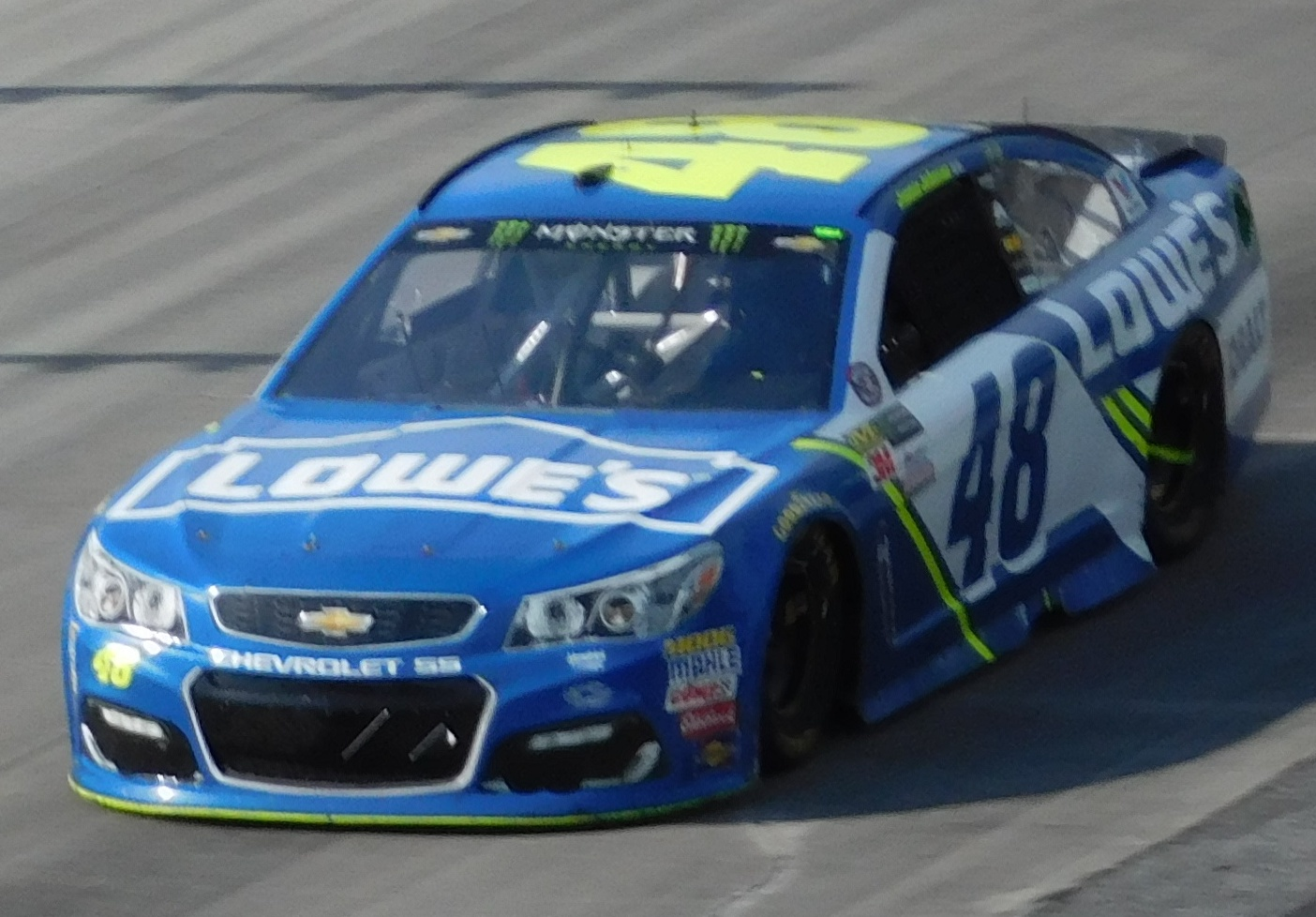
Johnson before winning his final race, the 2017 AAA 400 Drive for Autism

Johnson came into 2017 as the defending NASCAR Cup Series champion. The start of the season didn't go as smoothly as the end of last season, however. Through the first six races of the season, Johnson only scored one top-ten finish. He then rebounded with back-to-back wins at the 2017 O'Reilly Auto Parts 500 in Texas (started from the rear of the field) and the 2017 Food City 500 at Bristol, his first win at The Last Great Coliseum since 2010. This would be the fourteenth and final time he won back-to-back races in his career. The following week, Johnson would finish just outside the Top 10 at Richmond, after colliding with teammate Dale Earnhardt Jr late in the event, leading to an eventual flat tire and spin for the driver of the No. 88.

Johnson scored his third win of the season at Dover in June after passing Kyle Larson on an overtime restart, which ended under caution with a multicar incident behind the two leaders. This was Johnson's record-holding 11th win at Dover and 83rd career victory, tying him with NASCAR Hall of Famer, Cale Yarborough. This would eventually be Johnson's final NASCAR Cup Series win.

The rest of the season didn't go smoothly for Johnson. In the week following his Dover triumph, during the Axalta presents the Pocono 400, Johnson's brakes failed into turn 1 at a speed of over 200 MPH, resulting in a tremendous impact with the outside SAFER barrier. Similarly, directly behind Johnson, fellow competitor Jamie McMurray also experienced a brake failure and impacted the wall hard, igniting a large vehicle fire. Both Johnson and McMurray were uninjured in the accident.

Johnson suffered a big slump during the summer part of the season, failing to earn a top-five finish and only netting three top-ten finishes. During that stretch, in the 2017 Brickyard 400 on a late race restart, Johnson's Lowes-sponsored Chevrolet started billowing smoke while running in third place. Heading into turn 3, the two race leaders, Brad Keselowski and Kasey Kahne, battled one another, allowing Johnson to close in and make a three-wide move to the inside. Without much space into the corner, and with the obvious mechanical failure, the car broke sideways and impacted the outside retaining wall hard. The following week, Johnson had another run-in with teammate Kasey Kahne, resulting in a second consecutive DNF; his third in the last four races. Regardless, Johnson (from his wins earlier in the season) was able to qualify for the playoffs.

Entering the 2017 NASCAR Cup Series Playoffs, the defending champion was still one of the favorites to win the title, despite his results over the summer stretch. After earning his first top-five finish (third) since his Dover victory, fittingly in the fall Dover event, he advanced through the opening round and into the Round of 12. Johnson scored a seventh-place finish at Charlotte to open the second round, but the following week was involved in "The Big One" at Talladega. He was scored with a 24th-place result after his car was disqualified for violating the NASCAR Damaged Vehicle Policy, in which his crew worked on the car during the red flag. In the elimination race at Kansas Speedway, Johnson entered with a seven-point advantage. After having two separate spins, he drove his way through a large multicar accident off turn 2, involving Playoff drivers Matt Kenseth and Jamie McMurray, and rebounded with an eleventh-place finish. Assisted by fellow Playoff contenders finding trouble, Johnson qualified into the Round of 8, by just nine points.

Unfortunately, Johnson's performance slipped in the third round. He finished twelfth at Martinsville, but was followed by a disappointing 27th-place result at Texas. Entering the final race in the round at Phoenix, Johnson was 51 points behind the Playoff cutoff, and in a near must-win situation. However, on lap 148, Johnson's hopes at an eighth championship ended when he blew a tire in turn three, and hit the outside wall hard, ending his day and eliminating him from the Playoffs. Johnson finished tenth in the final standings, his fifteenth and final top-ten finish in the points standings.

==== 2018: Final season with Knaus and Lowe's ====
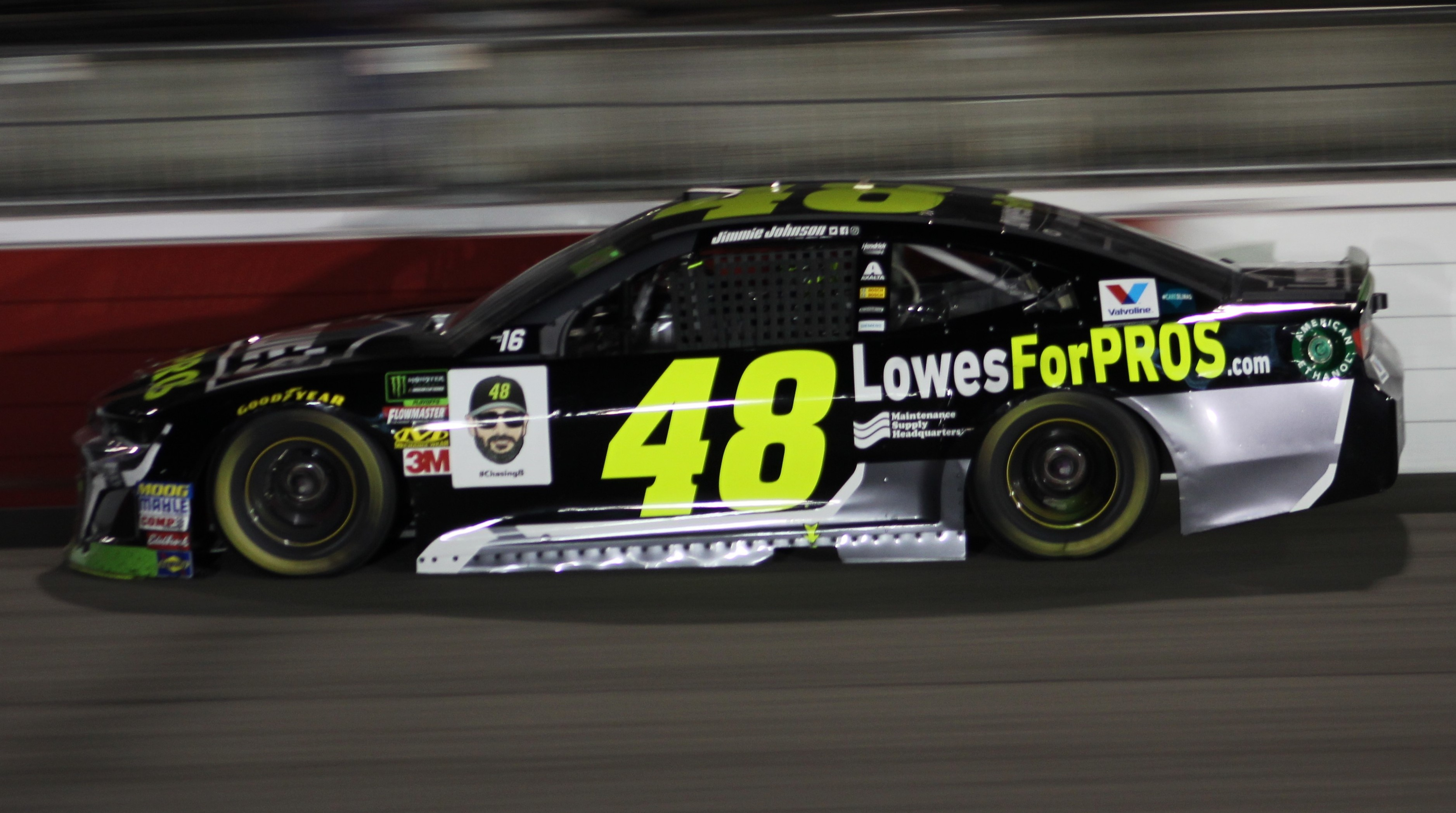
Johnson's 2018 car at Richmond Raceway

Johnson's Speedweeks did not go smoothly, wrecking in each of his three races. At the Advance Auto Parts Clash, he was wrecked on the last lap by Kyle Larson; this was the seventh year in a row he failed to finish the Clash. Johnson qualified third for the 2018 Daytona 500 but had to go to a backup car after wrecking in his Duel. On lap 59 of the Daytona 500, he got caught up in a wreck started by Ryan Blaney, and Ricky Stenhouse Jr., which also involved his teammate William Byron, Erik Jones, Daniel Suárez, Trevor Bayne, and Ty Dillon and ended up 38th. Since then, Johnson struggled throughout the 2018 season with only two top-fives and eight top-ten finishes by the time he barely made the Playoffs for the fifteenth season in a row. Johnson's only great run of the season came at the Charlotte Roval race where he ran in the top-ten for most of the day and battled Martin Truex Jr. for the win on the final lap, but he locked his brakes on turn 17 and spun out of control, taking Truex out with him in the process while Blaney passed them to win the race. Johnson finished eighth, and as a result of a three-way tie with zero points, he was eliminated in the Round of 16. Johnson scored only one more top-ten finish afterward and wound up a then career-worst fourteenth in the final point standings since running full-time in 2002, winless for the first time in his career, along with equaling a career-low eleven top-ten finishes for the second season in a row.

Johnson notably gave teammate and friend Chase Elliott a push to the front stretch when his car ran out of fuel when being congratulated by the rest of the drivers after recording his first career win, at Watkins Glen.

On March 14, 2018, Lowe's announced it would no longer sponsor the No. 48 car after the 2018 season; Ally Financial assumed primary sponsorship of the team in 2019 on a two-year deal. Johnson and his long-time crew chief Knaus parted ways at the end of the season, ending a seventeen-year partnership, the longest in NASCAR history. Johnson was paired with JR Motorsports crew chief Kevin Meendering in the 2019 season.

==== 2019 ====
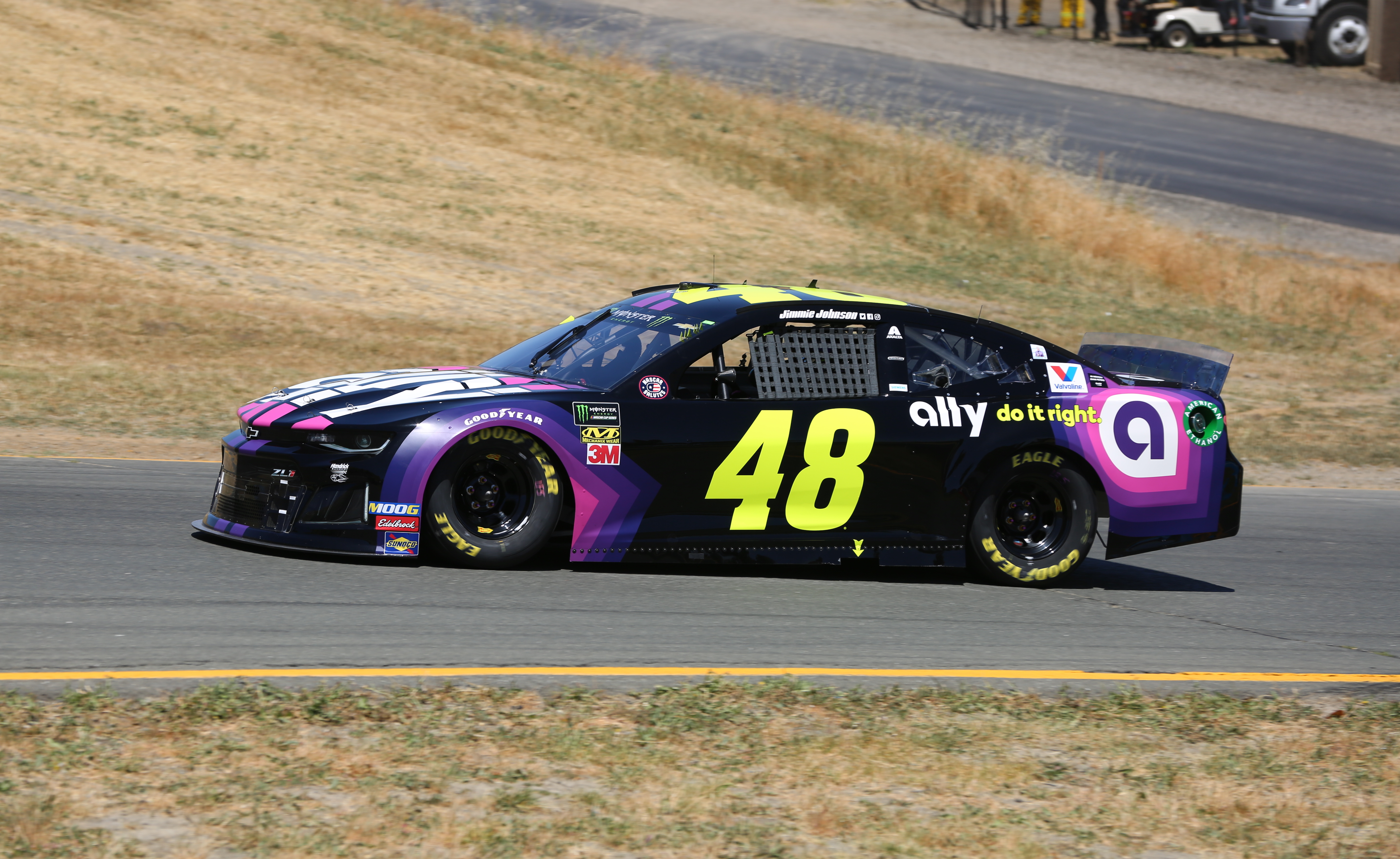
Johnson racing during the 2019 Toyota/Save Mart 350

The 2019 season started on a positive note for Johnson, as he won the 2019 Advance Auto Parts Clash after contact between him and Paul Menard sent Menard spinning while battling for the lead and triggering "The Big One" on lap 55 right before the rain arrived. It was also the first race with new sponsor Ally Financial and crew chief Meendering. He followed it up by finishing eighth in the first duel race. In the Daytona 500, Johnson ran up front most of the race, but when he came to pit road with around 40 to go, B. J. McLeod and Cody Ware's cars spun behind him and hit him in the left rear. The contact ripped off the left rear quarter-panel. He recovered to finish ninth after being two laps down. In the next race at Atlanta Motor Speedway, Jimmie finished 24th, two laps down. He followed up by finishing nineteenth. He followed up that performance with a ninth-place finish. On March 29 in O'Reilly Auto Parts 500 qualifying at Texas, Johnson got his first pole since 2016 at Texas and scored his first Top 5 finish since the 2018 Coca-Cola 600 two days later. At the Coca-Cola 600, Johnson ran well and ended up finishing eighth. At Chicagoland Speedway, Johnson started fourth and took the lead on lap seven from Austin Dillon. He went on to finish fourth, followed by a third-place finish at the rain-shortened Coke Zero Sugar 400 a week later, his best finishes of the season.

On July 29, 2019, following a string of disappointing finishes during the season, Hendrick Motorsports announced that race engineer Cliff Daniels would replace Meendering as the crew chief of the No. 48. At Watkins Glen, Johnson finished nineteenth after being spun out by Ryan Blaney, leading to an argument between the two after the race. The animosity between them lasted until Michigan a week later.

In September 2019, Johnson missed the playoffs cut for the first time in his NASCAR career after finishing 35th in the Brickyard 400 due to contact with Kurt Busch and William Byron that sent his car crashing hard into the wall.

Johnson scored four more top-ten finishes in the playoffs and wound up finishing a career-worst eighteenth place in the final standings, going winless for the second straight season. Many crashes throughout the season brought down his otherwise promising year.

On October 4, 2019, Ally extended its sponsorship of the No. 48 for three more years through the 2023 season.

==== 2020: Final full-time season ====
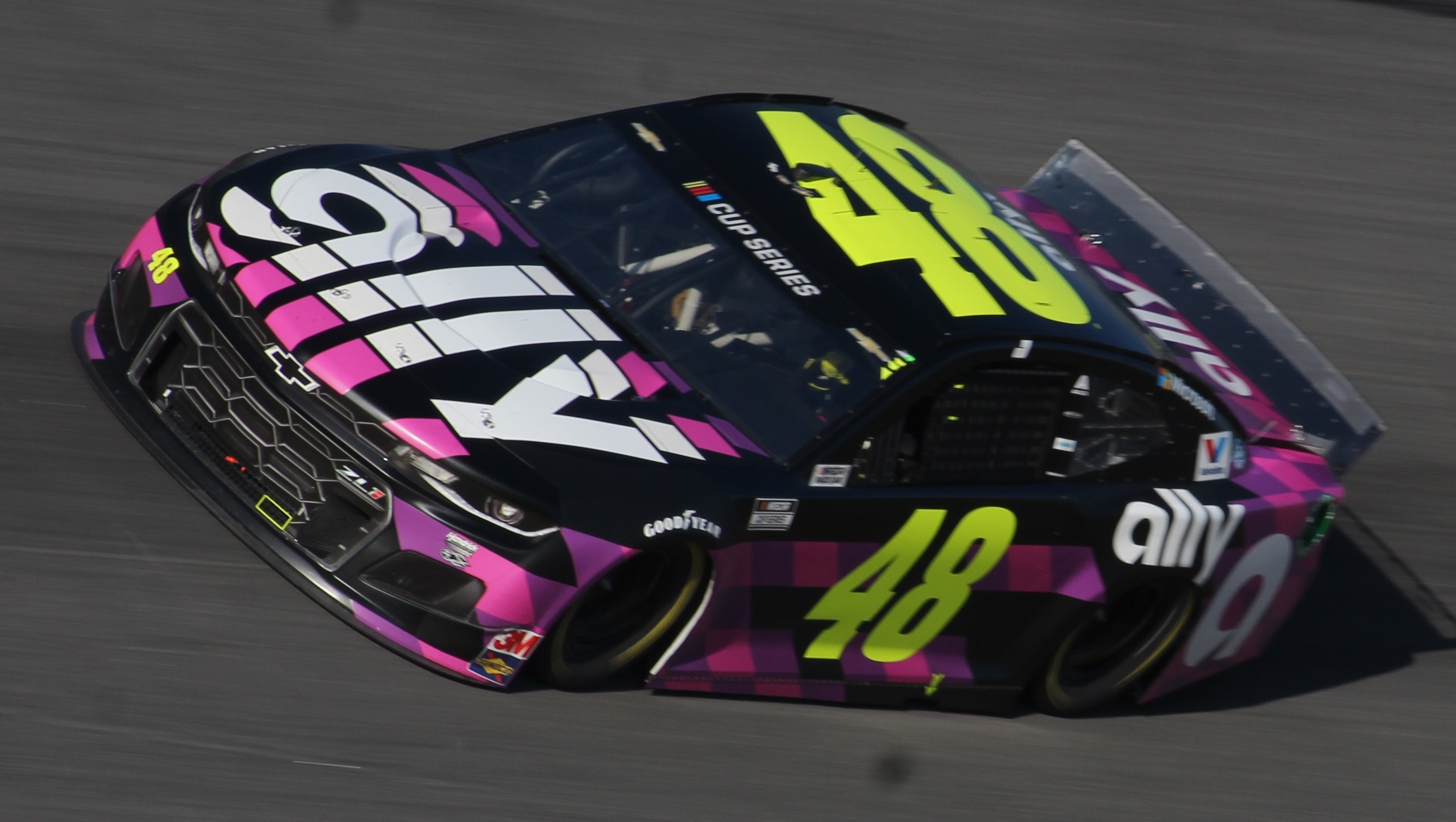
Johnson's 2020 car at Daytona International Speedway

On November 20, 2019, Johnson announced that the 2020 Cup season would be his last full-time season of racing, although he did not rule out a part-time schedule after that. The 2020 season started with the Daytona 500 qualifying, he finished fourth for a second year in a row. Later that day, he entered the 2020 Busch Clash as the defending champion. He started sixteenth and finished eleventh after a tire spun on the first restart in overtime. Next race was the 2020 Bluegreen Vacations Duels. He started and finished second behind team-mate William Byron in Duel 2. In his last Daytona 500, he started sixth and finished 35th after Kyle Busch and Brad Keselowski triggered "The Big One". Next week in Las Vegas, he finished first in the final practice. He started eighteenth and finished fifth in the race. At his home track Auto Club, he qualified second, losing the pole position to Clint Bowyer by 0.007 seconds. In the race, his wife and children waved the green flag at the start of the race. There was a four-wide salute before the race to honor him. For most of the event, he was in the top ten and led ten laps; he finished seventh.

In The Real Heroes 400 at Darlington, the first race back after the delay forced by the COVID-19 pandemic, Johnson was leading in the final lap of the first stage when he lost control of his car and crashed after contact with Chris Buescher who was a lap down at the time. It marked his 100th race in a row without a win. A few days later in the Toyota 500 at the same track, Johnson bounced back with an eighth-place finish in the same track. At the Coca-Cola 600, he qualified second, losing the pole position to Kurt Busch by 0.009 seconds. Johnson finished second in the 600 but was disqualified after his car failed post-race technical inspection. He bounced back with an 11th-place run in Charlotte's next race Alsco Uniforms 500.

Johnson enjoyed a pair of top-ten finishes at Bristol and Atlanta. At Martinsville, he overcame a start at 21st and finished third in the first stage, and scored his first stage win of the year and the third of his career in the second segment, but dropped back in the third stage and finished tenth. He fell back early due to car issues at Homestead, but ended with a strong run to make his way to the top twenty and finish sixteenth. The following week at Talladega, Johnson spearheaded a pre-race ceremony in support of Bubba Wallace after it was falsely reported a noose was in his garage; before the race, Johnson texted his peers that he intended to stand with Wallace during the national anthem, with the drivers also pushing his car to the front of pit road. In the race, Johnson was on the verge of taking the lead with three laps remaining before being spun by Harvick.

On July 3, 2020, two days before the Brickyard 400 at Indianapolis, Johnson announced he had tested positive for the coronavirus, forcing him to miss the race and Justin Allgaier to take over the No. 48. This snapped a 663-race streak in which Johnson started a Cup event. Johnson was cleared to return to racing on July 8, 2020, after testing negative twice, and he received a waiver that allowed him to remain playoff eligible should he qualify. His first race back was the Quaker State 400 at Kentucky, a track at which he had never won before. With 23 laps to go, he was coming off of the fastest three laps of the race and a strong run from ninth to third before taking the inside on a restart and being nipped by Brad Keselowski in the left rear, spinning out. He finished the race in eighteenth. The next week at Texas, Johnson was again one of the fastest cars, putting up a top-ten lap before getting loose and hitting the wall in stage 2. On top of that, his crew committed a penalty for too many crew members over the wall. He finished 26th and only two points above the playoff cutoff in the standings. Johnson's misfortunes continued at Kansas when he was collected in a third-stage crash while running in the top ten, followed by a first-stage spin at New Hampshire while fighting for a top-five spot.

Prior to the Go Bowling 235 at the Daytona road course, the No. 48 team changed the Ally paint scheme from black to white, which Johnson branded as a "rAlly" livery in an effort to "reset" his luck. Johnson, who had experience at the road course via the 24 Hours of Daytona, finished fourth in a run that he described as "what we needed".

The final three races of the regular season saw Johnson battling with Byron and Matt DiBenedetto for the final playoff spots. Entering the doubleheader at Johnson's strongest track, Dover, Johnson was 25 points behind his teammate. He finished seventh and third in the two races while Byron was 28th and fourth, which placed Johnson below Byron by four points with one race before the playoffs, and nine points behind DiBenedetto. The final race, the Coke Zero Sugar 400 at Daytona, began with a strong first stage for Johnson as he finished fifth, ahead of Byron and DiBenedetto. The second stage saw him pit early to avoid having to save fuel, and he took advantage of the drivers pitting later in the stage, for another fifth-place finish. Although the three bubble drivers avoided a late wreck in the final stage, Johnson was collected in "The Big One" with two laps remaining. Although his team was able to salvage the car to meet the minimum speed and finish 17th, DiBenedetto beat him for the last playoff seed by six points. In his post-race interview, Johnson lamented his misfortunes during the year including the Coca-Cola 600 disqualification and the positive COVID-19 test; he drew praise from fans for his humility when he congratulated Knaus, who moved to Byron's team, and expressed his gratitude to Hendrick Motorsports for his career.

In the first playoff race, the Cook Out Southern 500 at Darlington, despite being out of the playoffs, Johnson ran in the top five for most of the night in a throwback scheme that combined those of Dale Earnhardt and Richard Petty, to honor the two other seven-time champions. His teammates at Hendrick Motorsports also drove in throwback schemes to honor him in his last year.

During the fall Texas race, Johnson would gain publicity by running a special scheme created by designer Noah Sweet, otherwise known as Lefty or Lefty Designs. Sweet, four months earlier in June, had created a mock Jimmie Johnson scheme adorned with pride flag colors, which had led to an excess of harassment towards Sweet and led him to take a temporary break from social media. During his break, encouragement came from most in the NASCAR community (with the hashtag #WeLoveLefty created and spread), including Johnson himself. In a few weeks, Ally president Andreas Brimmer and Jimmie Johnson would tell Sweet on a video call that he would have his chance to get his design on Johnson's car. Sweet, whose favorite driver throughout his life had been Johnson, said, "I'm going to remember it for the rest of my life. I am." The car eventually ran in the 2020 Autotrader EchoPark Automotive 500, finishing 36th due to engine issues.

Johnson's only top-ten of the playoffs came in his final start with a fifth-place finish in the Season Finale 500 at Phoenix; he was the highest-finishing driver of those not in the Championship Round. After the race, he congratulated teammate Elliott on his maiden championship and performed a Polish victory lap.

He ended his final season with ten top-ten finishes, the lowest of his career.

==== 2023–present: Legacy Motor Club co-owner, part-time return to NASCAR ====
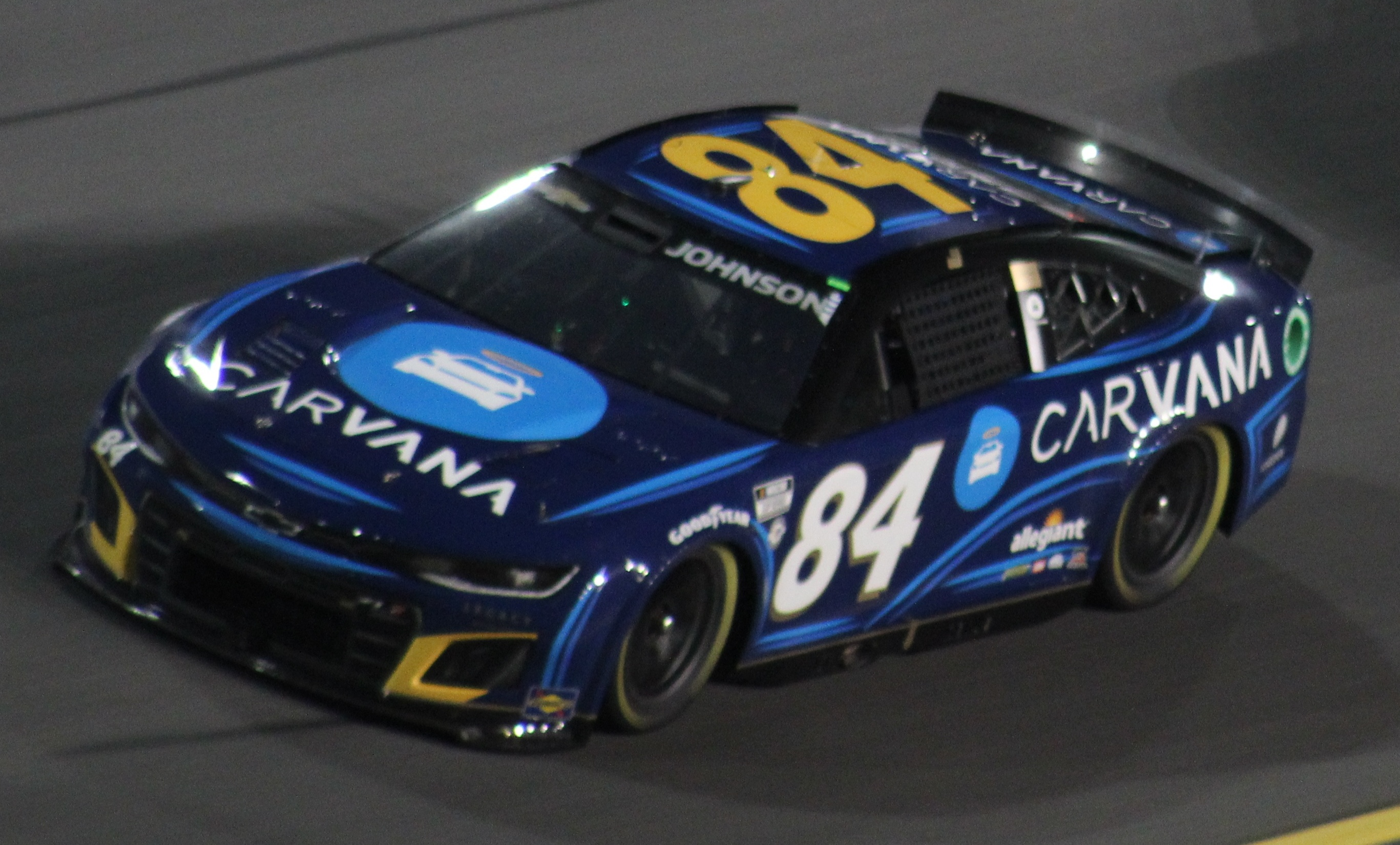
Johnson in the No. 84 at Daytona International Speedway in 2023

On November 4, 2022, Johnson purchased an ownership stake in Petty GMS Motorsports. In addition, he announced his return to the Cup Series on a part-time basis in 2023, starting with an attempt to make the 2023 Daytona 500.

On January 11, 2023, the team was rebranded under the name Legacy Motor Club, with Johnson announced to be running the No. 84. On February 14, 2023, Johnson made the Daytona 500 entry field by scoring the fastest lap among the non-chartered teams. Johnson finished 31st after being involved in an overtime crash. Johnson would then make a start at the COTA race in March, where he finished 38th after wrecking out on lap one. Johnson's next start would come at the 2023 Coca-Cola 600 in May. He finished 37th after spinning out twice and only completing 115 laps. On June 26, 2023, Johnson's in-laws were involved in a possible murder-suicide at their house in Muskogee, Oklahoma. Johnson was on the original entry list for the Chicago street course race, yet on June 27, 2023, Legacy Motor Club announced they would withdraw his entry from the race due to the tragedy.

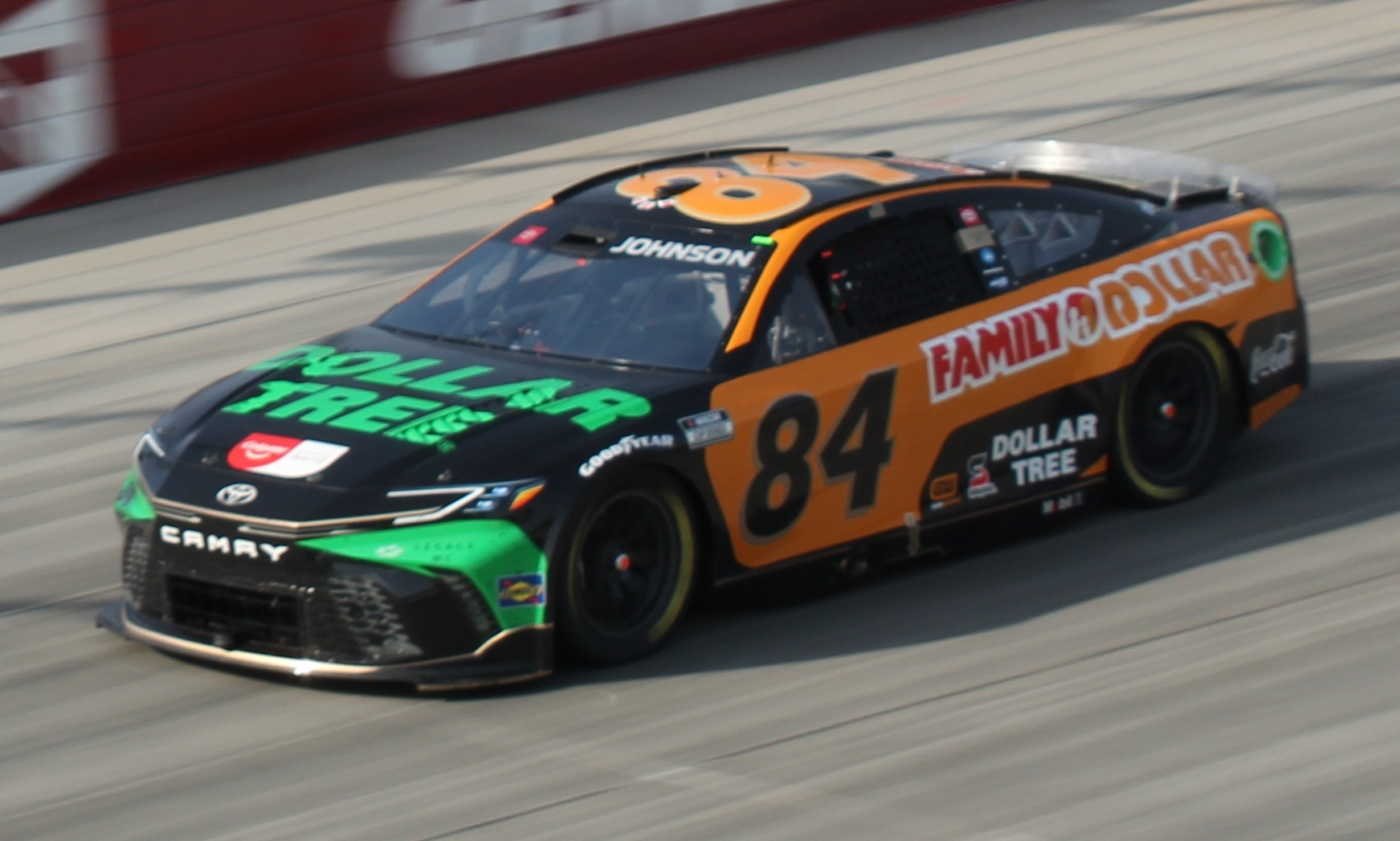
Johnson's No. 84 car at Dover Motor Speedway in 2024.

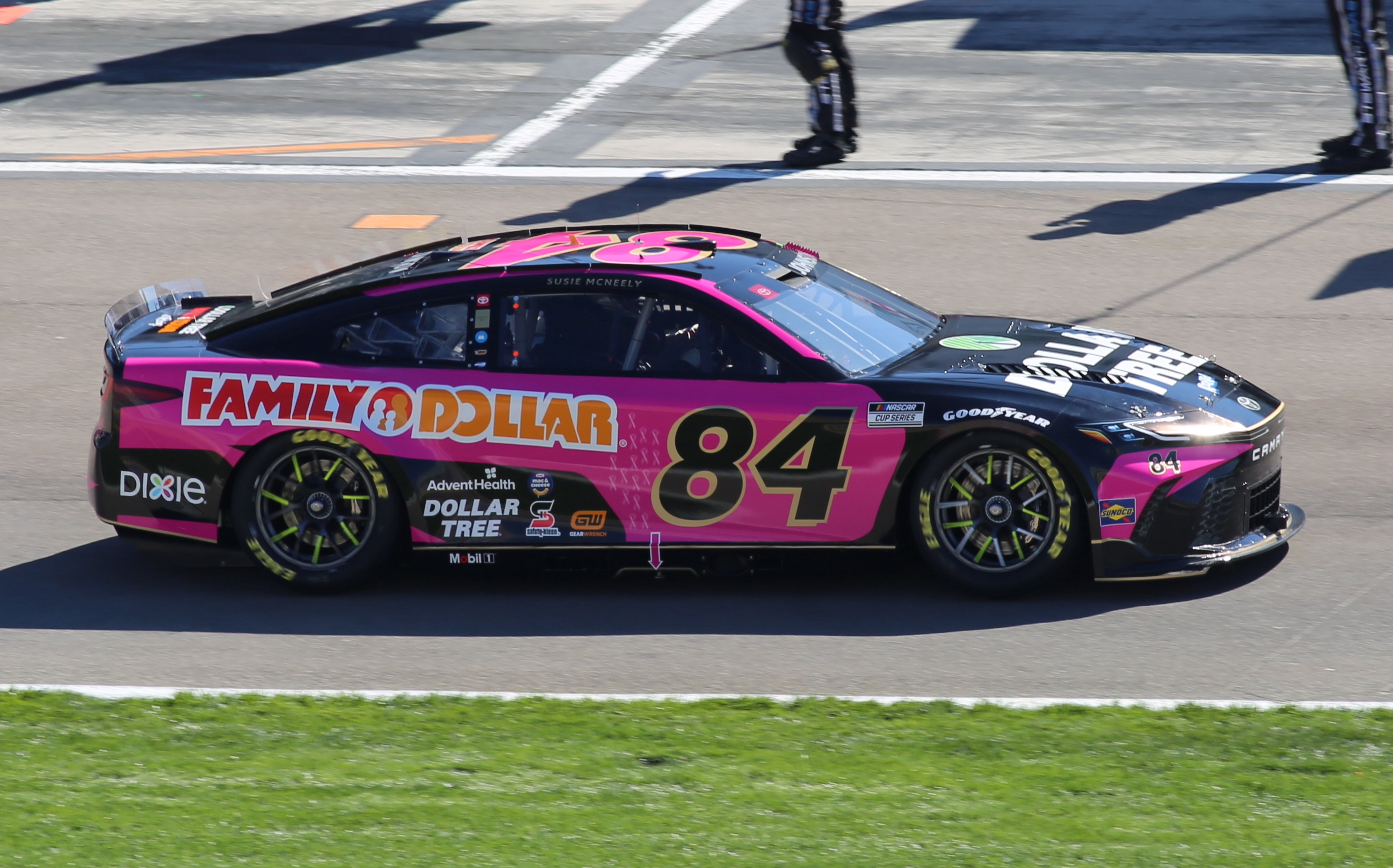
Johnson's No. 84 car at Las Vegas Motor Speedway in 2024

Johnson started his 2024 part-time season with a 28th-place finish at the 2024 Daytona 500. He also raced at Texas (29th), Dover (28th), Kansas (38th), Charlotte (29th), and Indianapolis (33rd). On July 26, Legacy Motor Club released crew chief Jason Burdett and several members of the No. 84 team.

On January 27, 2025, Johnson was named majority owner of Legacy Motor Club, with Knighthead Capital Management purchasing a minority stake and former co-owner Maury Gallagher stepping back into an ambassador role. At the 2025 Daytona 500, Johnson finished third, his highest finish at the race since winning in 2013, his highest finish in the Next Gen cars; his previous best was 26th at the 2024 season finale at Phoenix; and his highest finish since the 2020 Drydene 311 doubleheader at Dover. Johnson made his 700th Cup Series start at the 2025 Coca-Cola 600, but crashed on lap 112, finishing 40th.

For the 2026 season, Johnson made the starting grid of the 2026 Daytona 500 after applying for the Open Exemption Provisional. He is also scheduled to run the Coronado street race.

=== IndyCar Series ===
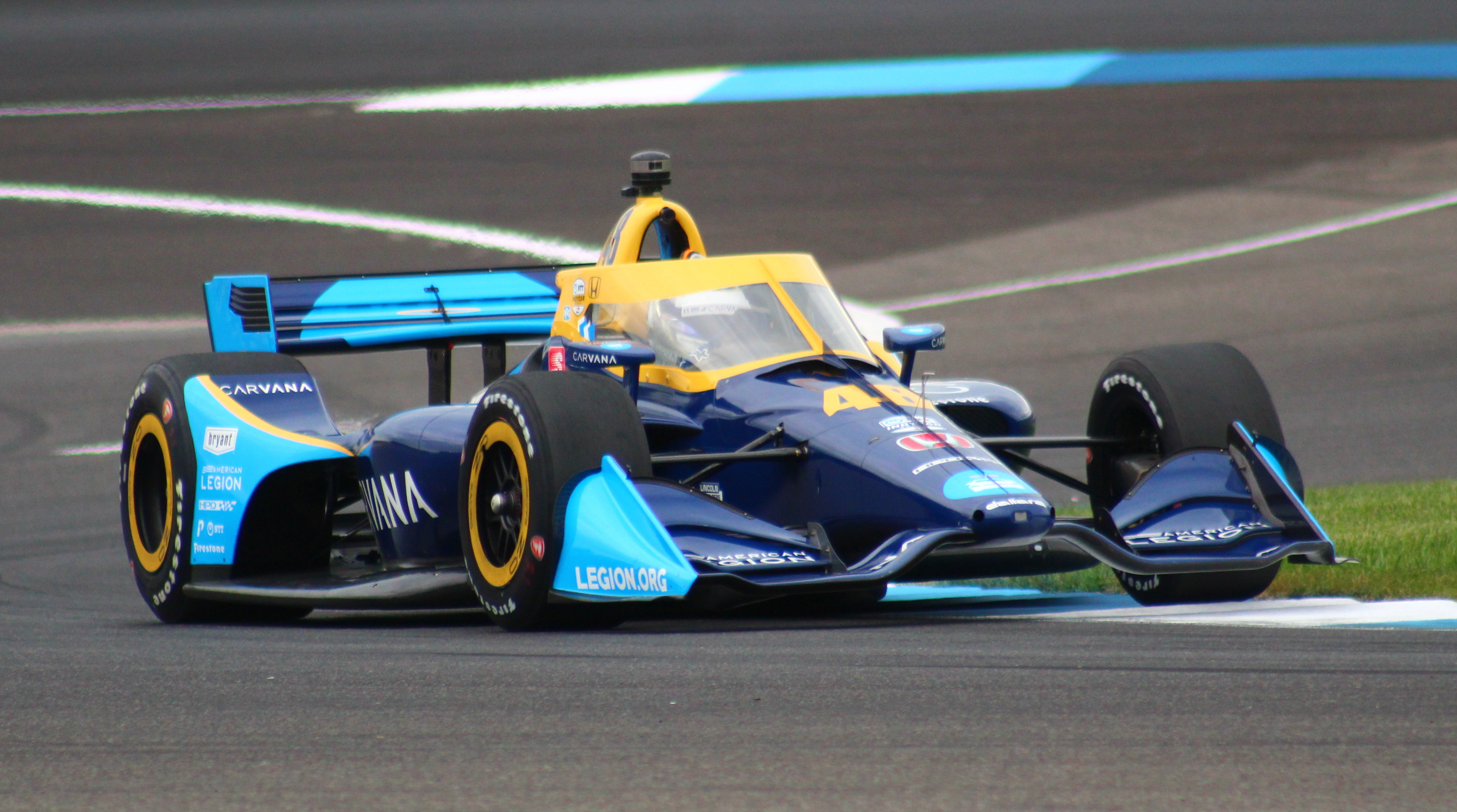
Johnson racing at Indianapolis Motor Speedway in 2021

In 2020, Johnson participated in a test with IndyCar Series team Chip Ganassi Racing. He initially had a test scheduled in March with Arrow McLaren SP at Barber Motorsports Park before it was canceled due to the COVID-19 pandemic, a second attempt with Chip Ganassi Racing on the Indianapolis road course in July was postponed when he tested positive for the virus. The CGR test finally took place on July 28, 2020, it was overseen by CGR owner Chip Ganassi and five-time IndyCar champion Scott Dixon (who is, along with Johnson, considered to be one of the best in their respective series) to discuss the car. Johnson said that driving an IndyCar was a "childhood dream" of his.

On September 9, 2020, Johnson announced that he would join Chip Ganassi Racing on a part-time basis in 2021 and 2022 to drive the road and street courses on the IndyCar circuit. The deal left open the possibility of running select NASCAR Cup Series events in conjunction, as Ganassi fielded two cars in NASCAR and could've added a part-time car for Johnson, staying under the four-car maximum for Cup teams. However, in 2021, Ganassi's NASCAR operations were sold to Justin Marks and absorbed into the Trackhouse Racing Team the following year. Johnson refused to run the ovals due to safety concerns of racing open-wheel cars on them but after both driving the cars and watching teammate Tony Kanaan run on ovals, he ultimately agreed to run an oval test at Texas to prep himself for the Indianapolis 500.

Throughout the year, Johnson largely struggled in IndyCar, frequently running at the back of the field and struggling with spins and accidents.

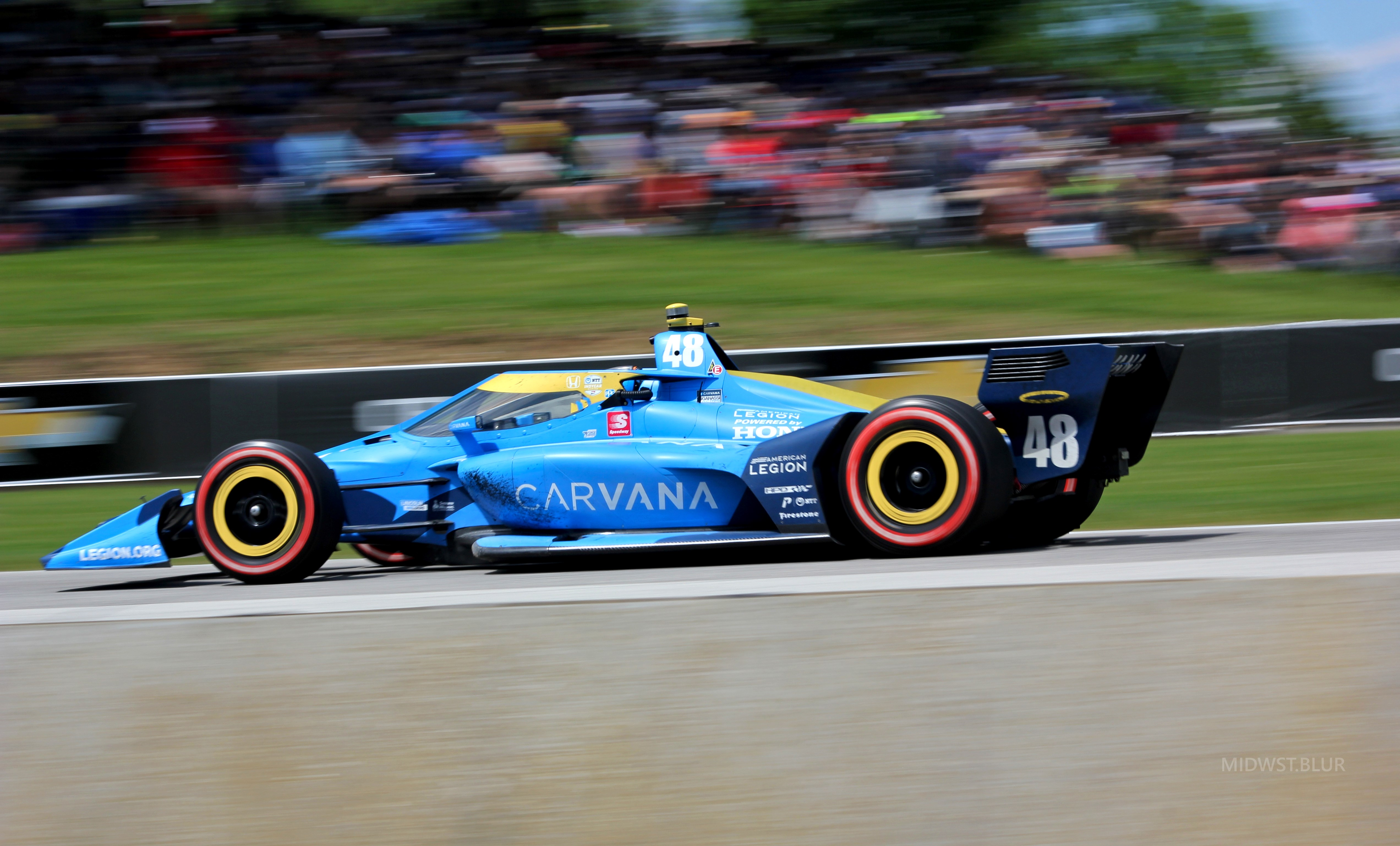
Johnson during the 2022 Sonsio Grand Prix at Road America

On December 15, 2021, Johnson announced that he would contest the full 2022 IndyCar schedule driving the No. 48 car for Chip Ganassi Racing. During his first oval race in the series, the XPEL 375 at Texas, Johnson finished a then career-best sixth. Johnson made his Indianapolis 500 debut later in the year. Johnson led two laps and, despite a late race crash, was elected Rookie of the Year for the race. Johnson proceeded to collect his first career IndyCar top-five in his first ever trip to Iowa Speedway at the Hy-Vee Salute to Farmers 300 presented by Google on July 24, 2022. On September 26, 2022, Johnson announced that he would be stepping back from racing full-time.

=== Other racing ===
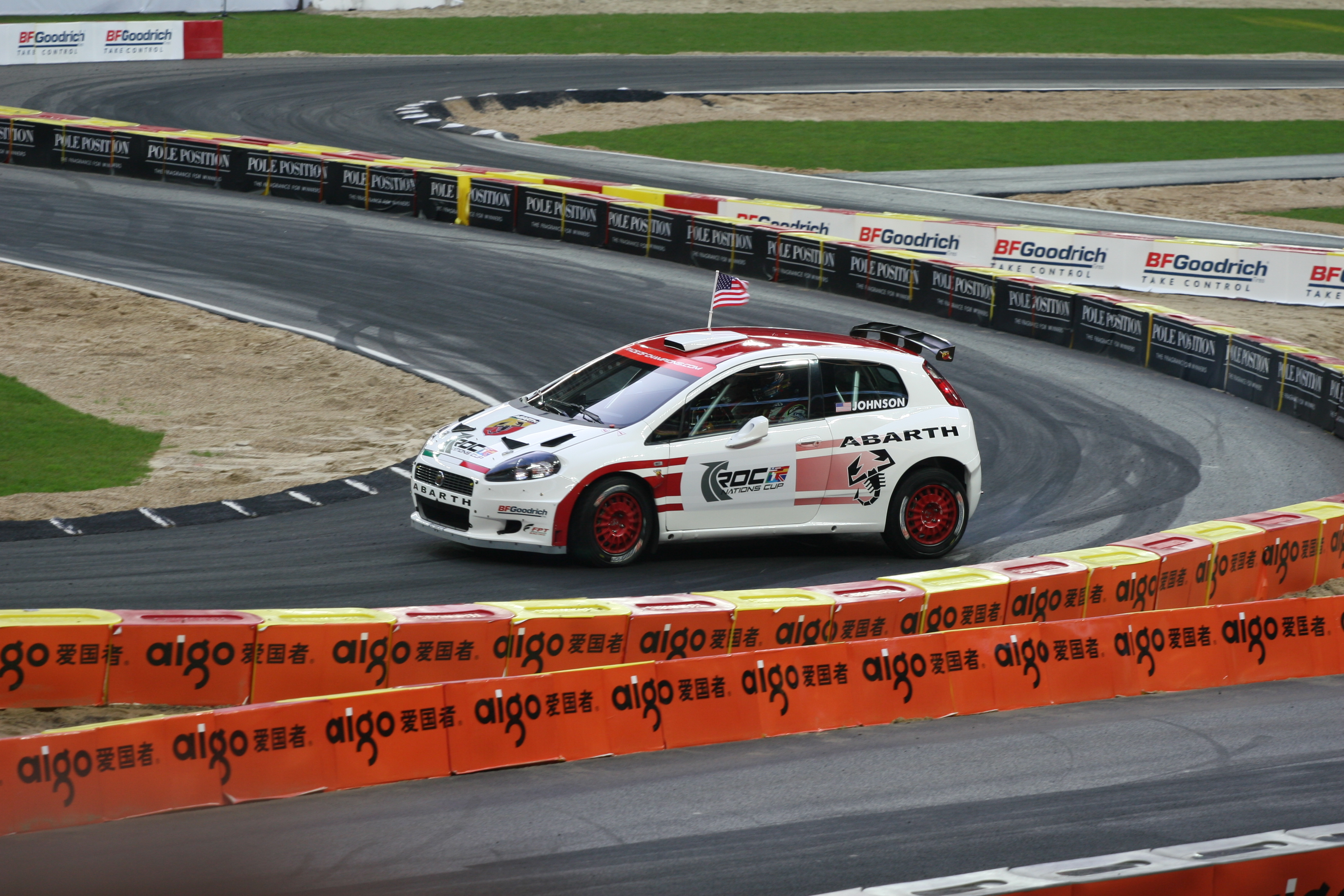
Johnson driving a Fiat Grande Punto S2000 Abarth at the 2007 Race of Champions at Wembley Stadium.

Johnson first raced in the Race of Champions in Europe in 2002. He was eliminated in the first runoff by then world rally champion Marcus Grönholm of Finland, but he and Jeff Gordon and Colin Edwards racing as Team USA won the teams' championship. He returned to the event two years later but lost the quarter finals 0–2 to Mattias Ekström of Sweden, who was DTM German Touring Car champion that year. Johnson entered the 2006 Race of Champions but did not start due to an injury received just days before the race. He still attended the event to cheer for teammate Travis Pastrana. In the 2007 event, Johnson was eliminated before the quarter-finals by Formula One driver Sébastien Bourdais of France.

In 2004, Johnson started racing in Grand-Am with the 24 Hours of Daytona, where he finished eighth. He also entered the event one year later, which his team, Howard-Boss Motorsports, finished second. Two years later, he entered two events, which were both held at Daytona International Speedway. During the races, his team finished 9th and 19th. In 2008, Johnson moved to Bob Stallings Racing with Alex Gurney and Jon Fogarty to race in the 2008 Rolex 24 at Daytona, where the team finished second. One year later, he returned with GAINSCO/Bob Stallings Racing for his fifth Rolex 24 appearance. During the race, his team finished seventh. He returned to the team in 2010 to race in the Rolex 24 and Sahlen's Six Hours of the Glen. During the Rolex 24 at Daytona his team finished 21st, while at Watkins Glen the team finished sixth. He returned to the Rolex 24, in 2011 where his team finished fifteenth.

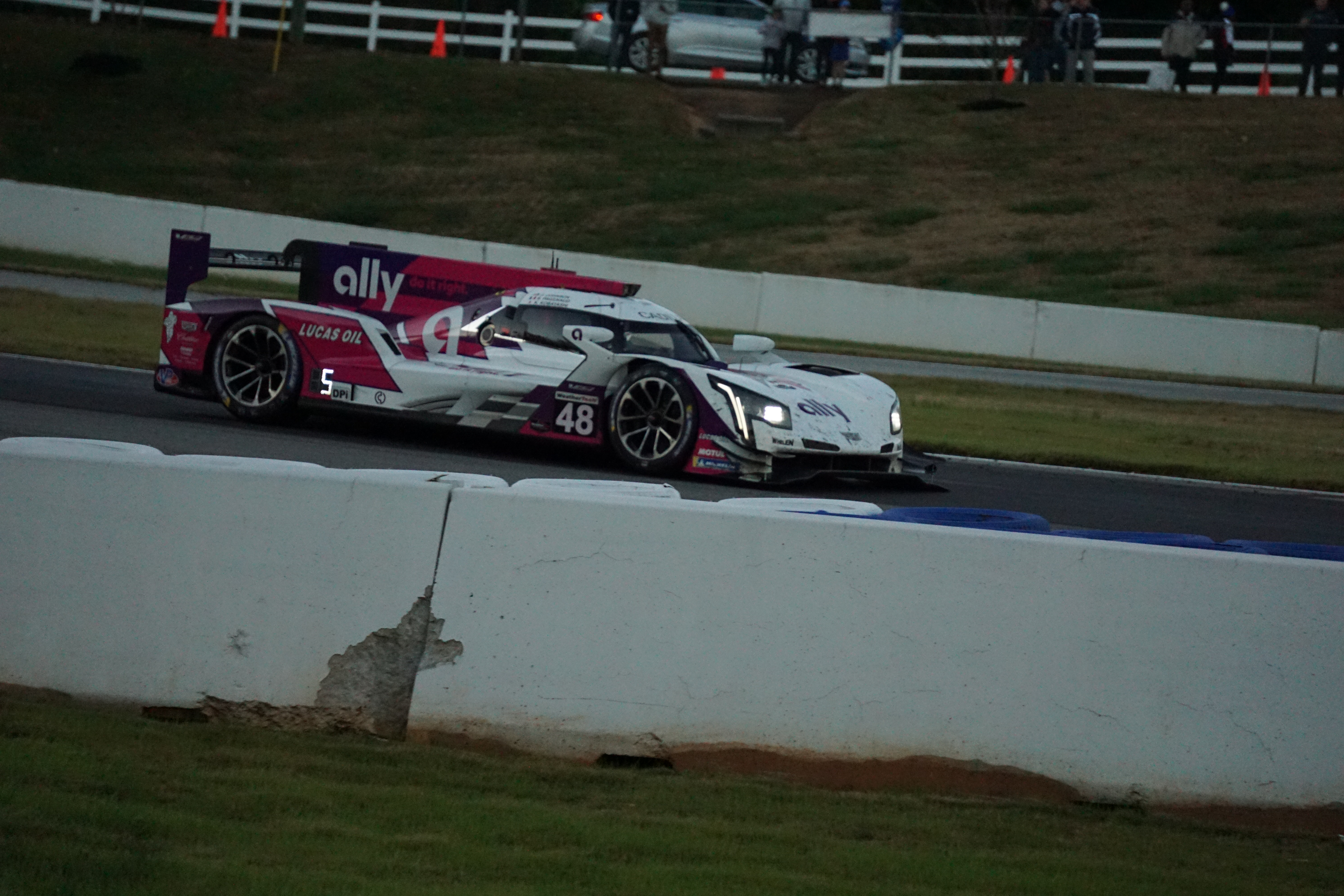
The 48 Action Express Racing Cadillac - for which Johnson was the flagship driver - running in the 2021 Petit Le Mans at Road Atlanta.

Johnson returned to the race in 2021, driving an Ally Financial-sponsored No. 48 Cadillac DPi-V.R for Action Express Racing alongside Simon Pagenaud, Kamui Kobayashi, and Mike Rockenfeller. He finished second for a third time in his career. Alongside Pagenaud and Kobayashi, he will participate in all IMSA Michelin Endurance Cup races for 2021, which include Sebring, Watkins Glen, and Road Atlanta. At Sebring, his team finished third, but they were moved to the rear of DPi classification for violating drive time rules after Pagenaud was found to have driven more than the maximum four hours within a six-hour time period. The team finished 28th in overall ranking.

On November 26, 2018, Johnson participated in a motorsports cultural exchange with two-time F1 champion Fernando Alonso at Bahrain International Circuit, where both drivers compared their respective race cars.

== Personal life ==
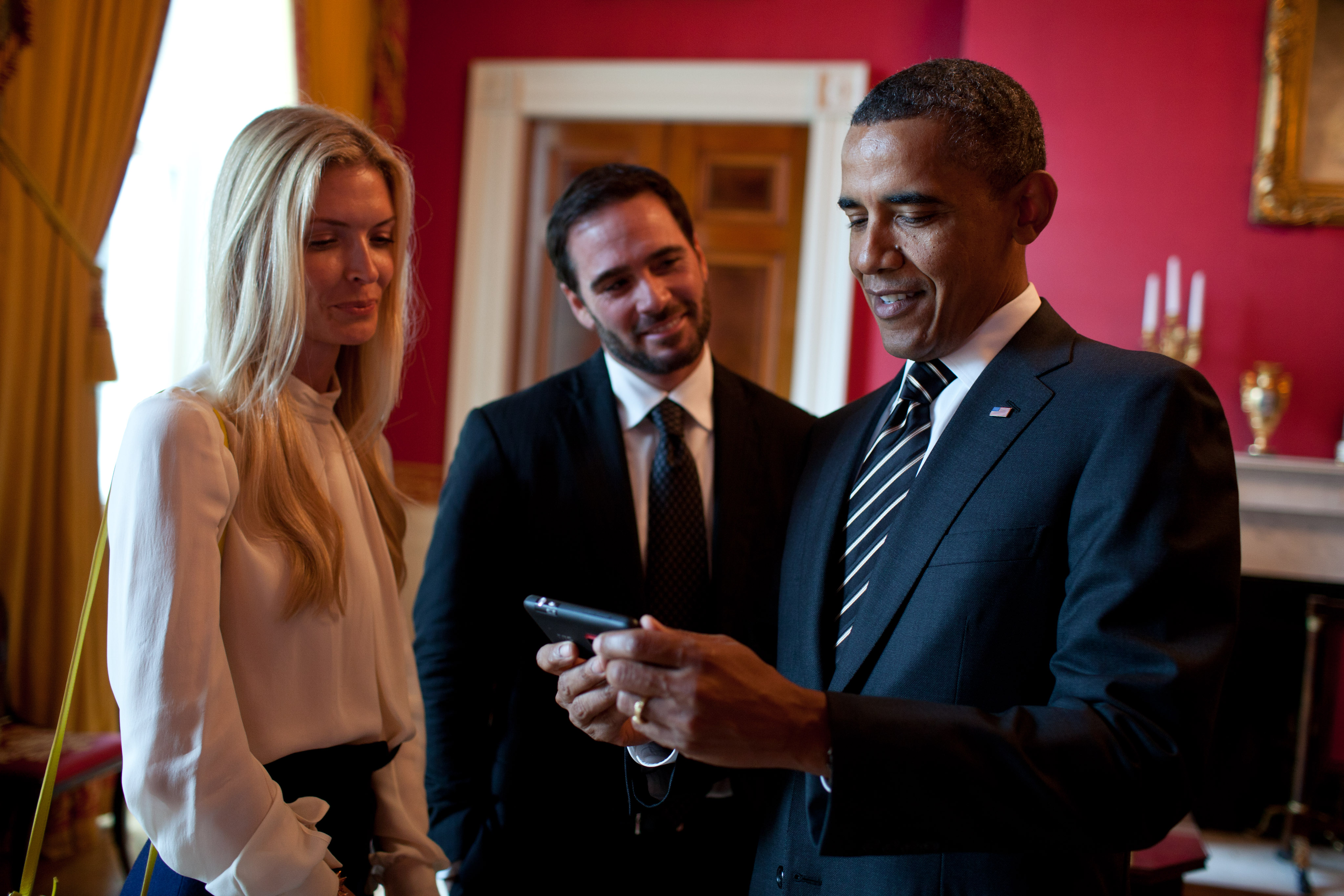
Johnson (center) with his wife Chandra and President Barack Obama in 2011

Johnson was born on September 17, 1975 in El Cajon, California, the son of Catherine Ellen "Cathy" (née Dunnill) and Gary Ernest Johnson. He has two younger brothers, Jarit and Jessie. Both have made professional off-road racing starts in the TORC: The Off-Road Championship. Johnson attended Granite Hills High School, while he raced motorcycles during the weekends. He was a varsity water polo player, diver, and swimmer, and graduated in 1993. The number 48 is retired from all sports teams uniforms at his school and Johnson was inducted into the school's Athletic Hall of Fame. Johnson lives in Charlotte, North Carolina like many other NASCAR drivers. He is married to Chandra Janway. They have two daughters.

Johnson is a triathlete, regularly participating in triathlons and long-distance running; the Jimmie Johnson Foundation's Wellness Challenge also hosts triathlons. In 2019, he competed in the Boston Marathon, finishing with a time of 3:09:07 and 4,155th overall (3,746th among males and 641st in the Male 40–44 class).

Johnson was close friends with NASCAR competitor Blaise Alexander. Following Alexander's death during a racing incident at Charlotte in 2001, which prompted NASCAR as a sanctioning body to require the use of the HANS device by every driver in its top three series, Johnson's car has had a flame decal with Alexander's initials inside of it at every race. In 2004, following the plane crash that killed the son of Rick Hendrick, Ricky, along with nine others, the tail number of the Hendrick plane that crashed was added alongside Alexander's initials.

=== The Jimmie Johnson Foundation ===
The Jimmie Johnson Foundation was launched by Johnson and his wife, Chandra, in 2006. The foundation helps children, families, and communities in need. In 2007, Johnson opened Jimmie Johnson's Victory Lanes in Randleman, North Carolina, which is a four-lane bowling alley for campers at Pattie and Kyle Petty's Victory Junction Gang Camp. The foundation supports several charities, including Habitat for Humanity, Hendrick Marrow Program, Make-A-Wish Foundation, and Victory Junction. Every year, it holds a golf tournament in San Diego, which raises money for K-12 public education. Since the beginning, the tournament has raised a total of $8 million to help fund several projects. During 2009 and 2010, the foundation awarded $1.5 million for the Education Champions Grants program. The money is given to public schools in California, Oklahoma, and North Carolina. It helps fund basic needs, such as technology, outdoor classrooms, playground construction, and reading programs. The foundation has also assisted the American Red Cross with disaster relief efforts.

In 2014, Johnson joined the Ban Bossy campaign, as a spokesperson advocating leadership in young girls.

=== On the Road ===
In 2012, Johnson and his wife Chandra self-published a coffee table book titled On the Road, with photographs taken by Missy McLamb.

== Legacy ==
For his successes, Johnson is often regarded as one of the greatest drivers in NASCAR history. Other drivers and teammates have also lauded Johnson for his leadership and helpfulness, including younger drivers Corey LaJoie (for whom Johnson advocated to get a seat in a Cup car), Chase Elliott, William Byron, Bubba Wallace, Alex Bowman, and Ryan Blaney as well as veterans including Brad Keselowski, Kevin Harvick, Jeff Gordon, and more.

=== Awards and honors ===
In 2000, People recognized Johnson as one of their "Men in the Fast Lane".

Johnson has won the Driver of the Year Award five times (2006, 2007, 2009, 2010, 2013). In 2009, he became the first racing driver to win the Associated Press Male Athlete of the Year Award in the United States.

Johnson was ranked No. 1 on Forbes.com's list of "Most Influential Athletes" for two consecutive years (2011, 2012).

In 2018, Johnson received the fourth-annual Byrnsie Award, named after the late Fox NASCAR broadcaster Steve Byrnes, during FS1's RaceDay prior to the running of the Toyota/Save Mart 350 at Sonoma Raceway.

=== Records and milestones ===
At the time of his retirement, Johnson's 83 career points-paying victories made him the winningest active NASCAR driver, in sixth place among the all-time Cup Series winners; he is also ranked third among those who have competed during the sport's modern era (1972–present). He is tied in first with Dale Earnhardt Sr. and Richard Petty for most NASCAR Cup Series championships, with 7. He also has the most consecutive NASCAR Cup Series championships with 5.

Johnson is the all-time winningest Cup Series driver at the following tracks:

- Auto Club Speedway (6)
- Charlotte Motor Speedway (8)
- Dover International Speedway (11)
- Las Vegas Motor Speedway (4)
- Texas Motor Speedway (7)

Johnson won a Cup Series race at every track on the 2020 schedule except at Chicagoland Speedway (where he won his first NASCAR race, in the Busch Series), Kentucky Speedway, Watkins Glen International, The Roval at Charlotte Motor Speedway, and the Daytona International Speedway Road Course.

Up until 2019, Johnson was the only driver to have qualified for the NASCAR Cup Series playoffs every single year since its inception in 2004. He also holds the record for the most consecutive playoff appearances, with 15.

=== Soccer ===
On January 11, 2022, Johnson announced Charlotte FC's first ever MLS draft pick, and the first overall draft pick of the 2022 MLS SuperDraft, when Charlotte drafted Ben Bender out of the University of Maryland, College Park.

== In popular culture ==
=== Film and television appearances ===
Johnson appeared as a moonshine runner along with Ryan Newman in the opening scene of the 2004 NASCAR 3D: The IMAX Experience.

Johnson made an appearance as himself in the 2005 film Herbie: Fully Loaded, commenting on Herbie's sunroof as unusual for a stock car to have, and his car is also briefly seen from Herbie's POV.

Johnson starred in an episode of the television series Las Vegas in 2005.

Johnson starred in an episode of the HBO reality television series 24/7, titled "Jimmie Johnson: Race to Daytona". Cameras followed him from January 2010 to the 52nd Daytona 500 held on February 14, 2010.

In 2012, Johnson was featured in a NASCAR segment of Top Gear along with NASCAR drivers Jeff Gordon, Juan Pablo Montoya, and Kyle Petty.

Johnson appeared on The Tonight Show Starring Jimmy Fallon three times between 2014, 2016, and 2022. In the seventh episode of 2014, Johnson and Fallon raced motorized beer coolers. In the forty-eighth episode of 2016, Johnson joined Fallon and fellow championship 4 NASCAR drivers Carl Edwards, Joey Logano, and Kyle Busch in a game of Mario Kart. In the one hundred forty-fourth episode of 2022, Johnson and his daughter joined Fallon to promote the running of the 106th Running of the Indianapolis 500.

Johnson appeared on The Ellen DeGeneres Show during its tenth season in 2013. Fresh off his second Daytona 500 victory, Johnson challenged host Ellen DeGeneres to a go-kart race.

On November 19, 2013, Johnson became the first professional athlete to co-host ESPN's flagship news show, SportsCenter.

In 2015, Johnson appeared on the series Repeat After Me and voiced a lobster named Jimmie on the animated kids show Bubble Guppies.

In 2016, Johnson appeared in Blaze and the Monster Machines with fellow NASCAR drivers Chase Elliott, Kasey Kahne, and Danica Patrick.

In 2016, Johnson appeared in a cutaway gag for season two, episode seven of Superstore.

On November 30, 2021, Johnson appeared on CBS Mornings to promote the Jimmie Johnson Foundation's charity campaign with the American Legion.

In 2022, Johnson appeared alongside fellow NASCAR driver Clint Bowyer in season one, episode 3 of Barmageddon. The episode saw the two face off under the show's format.

=== Magazines ===
Johnson has appeared on the cover of several magazines, including NASCAR Illustrated; Sports Illustrated; Men's Fitness, and Success.

=== Music video ===
Johnson makes a cameo appearance as a pilot in the music video for The Avett Brothers' "Ain't No Man", the lead single from the album True Sadness (2016).

=== Video games ===
Johnson's Cup ride, the No. 48 Lowe's Chevrolet, is featured on the covers of NASCAR Racing 2003 Season alongside Kevin Harvick and NASCAR The Game: 2011.

Johnson and Hendrick Motorsports teammate Jeff Gordon are featured on the cover of NASCAR 06: Total Team Control, highlighting Team Control, the main addition of the game. Johnson is also one of the six cover drivers of NASCAR Kart Racing.

Johnson's No. 48 Chevrolet Impala is one of the twelve playable NASCAR Sprint Cup Series stock cars in the 2010 racing video game Gran Turismo 5. His 2011 car was later added to the game in the Spec II update of the game, with his 2013 car also being featured in the 2013 sequel Gran Turismo 6.

Johnson is featured in the 2011 racing video game Jimmie Johnson's Anything with an Engine.

Johnson's No. 48 is also playable in Forza Motorsport 6, via the NASCAR expansion pack. The expansion features twenty-four paint schemes from the 2016 Sprint Cup Series season, including Johnson's No. 48 Lowe's SS. Johnson, along with Chase Elliott and Kyle Busch, provide commentary in the expansion as the "voices of motorsport". Johnson and Elliott also had roles in developing the expansion.

Johnson, along with teammates Chase Elliott, Alex Bowman, and William Byron, were featured on the cover of NASCAR Heat 3.

Johnson was also featured in Ally Racer, a mobile game created to honor his final season by Ally Financial.

== See also ==
- List of Daytona 500 pole position winners
- List of Daytona 500 winners

Sporting positions
Preceded by Tony Stewart; Brad Keselowski; Kyle Busch	NASCAR Cup Series Champion; 2006, 2007, 2008, 2009, 2010; 2013; 2016	Succeeded by Tony Stewart; Kevin Harvick; Martin Truex Jr.
Preceded by Fernando Alonso; Jesús Puras; Rubén Xaus	Race of Champions; Nations' Cup; 2002 with: Colin Edwards; Jeff Gordon	Succeeded by Cristiano da Matta; Fonsi Nieto; Gilles Panizzi
Achievements
Preceded by Ryan Newman; Mark Martin; Carl Edwards	Sprint All Star Race winner 2003; 2006; 2012, 2013	Succeeded by Matt Kenseth; Kevin Harvick; Jamie McMurray
Preceded by Jeff Gordon; Matt Kenseth	Daytona 500 winner 2006; 2013	Succeeded by Kevin Harvick; Dale Earnhardt Jr.
Preceded by Tony Stewart; Tony Stewart; Paul Menard	Brickyard 400 winner 2006; 2008, 2009; 2012	Succeeded by Tony Stewart; Jamie McMurray; Ryan Newman
Preceded by Mark Martin; Kevin Harvick	Coca-Cola 600 winner 2003, 2004, 2005; 2014	Succeeded by Kasey Kahne; Carl Edwards
Preceded by Terry Labonte; Regan Smith	Bojangles' Southern 500 winner 2004; 2012	Succeeded by Greg Biffle; Matt Kenseth
Preceded by Dale Jarrett; Brad Keselowski	Advanced Auto Parts Clash winner 2005; 2019	Succeeded by Denny Hamlin; Erik Jones
Preceded by Tony Stewart	Prelude to the Dream Winner; 2010	Succeeded by Clint Bowyer
Preceded by Scott McLaughlin	Indianapolis 500; Rookie of the Year; 2022	Succeeded by Benjamin Pedersen
Awards
Preceded by Kevin Harvick	NASCAR EA cover athlete (shared with Jeff Gordon); 2006	Succeeded by Elliott Sadler
