= 2018 Foxwoods Resort Casino 301 =

Race details
- Race 20 of 36 in the 2018 Monster Energy NASCAR Cup Series
- Date: July 22, 2018
- Location: New Hampshire Motor Speedway in Loudon, New Hampshire
- Course: Permanent racing facility
- Course length: 1.058 miles (1.703 km)
- Distance: 301 laps, 318.458 mi (512.603 km)
- Average speed: 110.490 miles per hour (177.816 km/h)

Pole position
| Driver | Kurt Busch | Stewart–Haas Racing |
- Time: 28.511

Most laps led
| Driver | Kurt Busch | Stewart–Haas Racing |
- Laps: 94

Winner
| No. 4 | Kevin Harvick | Stewart–Haas Racing |

Television in the United States
- Network: NBCSN
- Announcers: Steve Letarte, Jeff Burton and Dale Earnhardt Jr.
- Nielsen ratings: 1.5/1.6 (Overnight)

Radio in the United States
- Radio: PRN
- Booth announcers: Doug Rice and Mark Garrow
- Turn announcers: Rob Albright (1 & 2) and Pat Patterson (3 & 4)

The 2018 Foxwoods Resort Casino 301 is a Monster Energy NASCAR Cup Series race held on July 22, 2018 at New Hampshire Motor Speedway in Loudon, New Hampshire. Contested over 301 laps on the 1.058-mile (1.703 km) speedway, it was the 20th race of the 2018 Monster Energy NASCAR Cup Series season.

== Entry list ==
| No. | Driver | Team | Manufacturer |
|---|---|---|---|
| 00 | Landon Cassill | StarCom Racing | Chevrolet |
| 1 | Jamie McMurray | Chip Ganassi Racing | Chevrolet |
| 2 | Brad Keselowski | Team Penske | Ford |
| 3 | Austin Dillon | Richard Childress Racing | Chevrolet |
| 4 | Kevin Harvick | Stewart–Haas Racing | Ford |
| 6 | Matt Kenseth | Roush Fenway Racing | Ford |
| 9 | Chase Elliott | Hendrick Motorsports | Chevrolet |
| 10 | Aric Almirola | Stewart–Haas Racing | Ford |
| 11 | Denny Hamlin | Joe Gibbs Racing | Toyota |
| 12 | Ryan Blaney | Team Penske | Ford |
| 13 | Ty Dillon | Germain Racing | Chevrolet |
| 14 | Clint Bowyer | Stewart–Haas Racing | Ford |
| 15 | Ross Chastain (i) | Premium Motorsports | Chevrolet |
| 17 | Ricky Stenhouse Jr. | Roush Fenway Racing | Ford |
| 18 | Kyle Busch | Joe Gibbs Racing | Toyota |
| 19 | Daniel Suárez | Joe Gibbs Racing | Toyota |
| 20 | Erik Jones | Joe Gibbs Racing | Toyota |
| 21 | Paul Menard | Wood Brothers Racing | Ford |
| 22 | Joey Logano | Team Penske | Ford |
| 23 | Blake Jones | BK Racing | Toyota |
| 24 | William Byron (R) | Hendrick Motorsports | Chevrolet |
| 31 | Ryan Newman | Richard Childress Racing | Chevrolet |
| 32 | Matt DiBenedetto | Go Fas Racing | Ford |
| 34 | Michael McDowell | Front Row Motorsports | Ford |
| 37 | Chris Buescher | JTG Daugherty Racing | Chevrolet |
| 38 | David Ragan | Front Row Motorsports | Ford |
| 41 | Kurt Busch | Stewart–Haas Racing | Ford |
| 42 | Kyle Larson | Chip Ganassi Racing | Chevrolet |
| 43 | Bubba Wallace (R) | Richard Petty Motorsports | Chevrolet |
| 47 | A. J. Allmendinger | JTG Daugherty Racing | Chevrolet |
| 48 | Jimmie Johnson | Hendrick Motorsports | Chevrolet |
| 51 | B. J. McLeod (i) | Rick Ware Racing | Chevrolet |
| 72 | Corey LaJoie | TriStar Motorsports | Chevrolet |
| 78 | Martin Truex Jr. | Furniture Row Racing | Toyota |
| 88 | Alex Bowman | Hendrick Motorsports | Chevrolet |
| 95 | Kasey Kahne | Leavine Family Racing | Chevrolet |
| 99 | Kyle Weatherman | StarCom Racing | Chevrolet |
Official entry list

== First practice ==
Kyle Busch was the fastest in the first practice session with a time of 28.362 seconds and a speed of 134.292 mph (216.122 km/h).

| Pos | No. | Driver | Team | Manufacturer | Time | Speed |
|---|---|---|---|---|---|---|
| 1 | 18 | Kyle Busch | Joe Gibbs Racing | Toyota | 28.362 | 134.292 |
| 2 | 42 | Kyle Larson | Chip Ganassi Racing | Chevrolet | 28.469 | 133.788 |
| 3 | 11 | Denny Hamlin | Joe Gibbs Racing | Toyota | 28.475 | 133.759 |
Official first practice results

== Qualifying ==
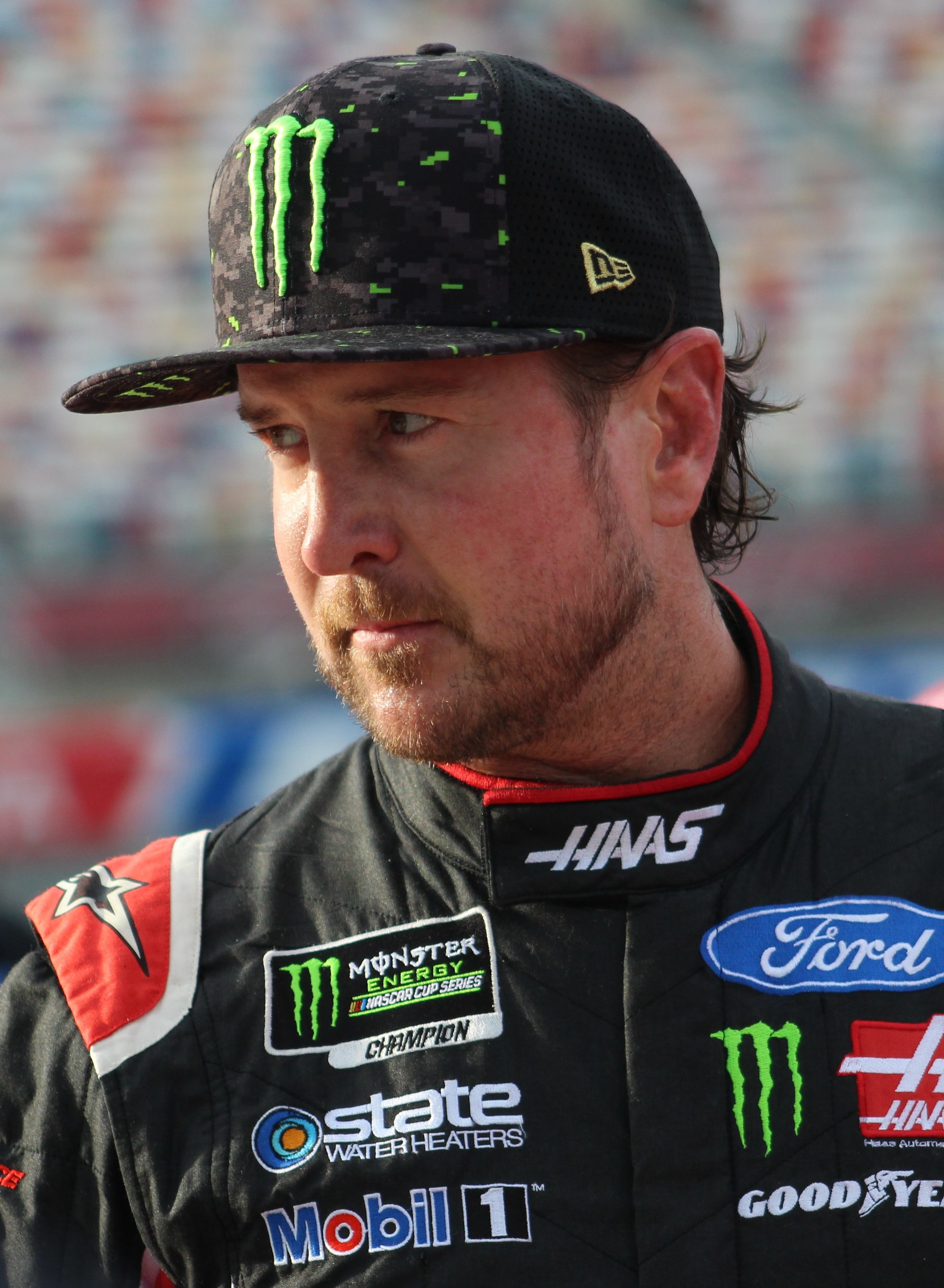
Kurt Busch scored the pole position.

Kurt Busch scored the pole for the race with a time of 28.511 and a speed of 133.591 mph (214.994 km/h).

=== Qualifying results ===
| Pos | No. | Driver | Team | Manufacturer | R1 | R2 | R3 |
|---|---|---|---|---|---|---|---|
| 1 | 41 | Kurt Busch | Stewart–Haas Racing | Ford | 28.677 | 28.590 | 28.511 |
| 2 | 78 | Martin Truex Jr. | Furniture Row Racing | Toyota | 28.685 | 28.543 | 28.530 |
| 3 | 18 | Kyle Busch | Joe Gibbs Racing | Toyota | 28.613 | 28.497 | 28.545 |
| 4 | 11 | Denny Hamlin | Joe Gibbs Racing | Toyota | 28.745 | 28.579 | 28.560 |
| 5 | 12 | Ryan Blaney | Team Penske | Ford | 28.746 | 28.593 | 28.698 |
| 6 | 2 | Brad Keselowski | Team Penske | Ford | 28.815 | 28.718 | 28.699 |
| 7 | 20 | Erik Jones | Joe Gibbs Racing | Toyota | 28.750 | 28.555 | 28.708 |
| 8 | 88 | Alex Bowman | Hendrick Motorsports | Chevrolet | 28.623 | 28.705 | 28.720 |
| 9 | 19 | Daniel Suárez | Joe Gibbs Racing | Toyota | 28.699 | 28.521 | 28.720 |
| 10 | 9 | Chase Elliott | Hendrick Motorsports | Chevrolet | 28.759 | 28.667 | 28.754 |
| 11 | 24 | William Byron (R) | Hendrick Motorsports | Chevrolet | 28.674 | 28.672 | 28.771 |
| 12 | 21 | Paul Menard | Wood Brothers Racing | Ford | 28.880 | 28.721 | 28.813 |
| 13 | 10 | Aric Almirola | Stewart–Haas Racing | Ford | 28.712 | 28.727 | — |
| 14 | 4 | Kevin Harvick | Stewart–Haas Racing | Ford | 28.736 | 28.734 | — |
| 15 | 14 | Clint Bowyer | Stewart–Haas Racing | Ford | 28.930 | 28.767 | — |
| 16 | 47 | A. J. Allmendinger | JTG Daugherty Racing | Chevrolet | 28.942 | 28.772 | — |
| 17 | 3 | Austin Dillon | Richard Childress Racing | Chevrolet | 28.971 | 28.798 | — |
| 18 | 31 | Ryan Newman | Richard Childress Racing | Chevrolet | 28.888 | 28.811 | — |
| 19 | 22 | Joey Logano | Team Penske | Ford | 28.859 | 28.834 | — |
| 20 | 42 | Kyle Larson | Chip Ganassi Racing | Chevrolet | 28.855 | 28.846 | — |
| 21 | 48 | Jimmie Johnson | Hendrick Motorsports | Chevrolet | 28.932 | 28.871 | — |
| 22 | 1 | Jamie McMurray | Chip Ganassi Racing | Chevrolet | 28.861 | 28.912 | — |
| 23 | 17 | Ricky Stenhouse Jr. | Roush Fenway Racing | Ford | 29.013 | 28.976 | — |
| 24 | 37 | Chris Buescher | JTG Daugherty Racing | Chevrolet | 29.013 | 29.022 | — |
| 25 | 13 | Ty Dillon | Germain Racing | Chevrolet | 29.020 | — | — |
| 26 | 95 | Kasey Kahne | Leavine Family Racing | Chevrolet | 29.085 | — | — |
| 27 | 43 | Bubba Wallace (R) | Richard Petty Motorsports | Chevrolet | 29.106 | — | — |
| 28 | 32 | Matt DiBenedetto | Go Fas Racing | Ford | 29.123 | — | — |
| 29 | 34 | Michael McDowell | Front Row Motorsports | Ford | 29.171 | — | — |
| 30 | 38 | David Ragan | Front Row Motorsports | Ford | 29.179 | — | — |
| 31 | 6 | Matt Kenseth | Roush Fenway Racing | Ford | 29.190 | — | — |
| 32 | 15 | Ross Chastain (i) | Premium Motorsports | Chevrolet | 29.477 | — | — |
| 33 | 72 | Corey LaJoie | TriStar Motorsports | Chevrolet | 29.491 | — | — |
| 34 | 00 | Landon Cassill | StarCom Racing | Chevrolet | 29.495 | — | — |
| 35 | 99 | Kyle Weatherman | StarCom Racing | Chevrolet | 29.855 | — | — |
| 36 | 51 | B. J. McLeod (i) | Rick Ware Racing | Chevrolet | 29.860 | — | — |
| 37 | 23 | Blake Jones | BK Racing | Toyota | 30.579 | — | — |
Official qualifying results

== Practice (post–qualifying) ==
=== Second practice ===
Denny Hamlin was the fastest in the second practice session with a time of 28.650 seconds and a speed of 132.942 mph (213.949 km/h).

| Pos | No. | Driver | Team | Manufacturer | Time | Speed |
|---|---|---|---|---|---|---|
| 1 | 11 | Denny Hamlin | Joe Gibbs Racing | Toyota | 28.650 | 132.942 |
| 2 | 12 | Ryan Blaney | Team Penske | Ford | 28.740 | 132.526 |
| 3 | 78 | Martin Truex Jr. | Furniture Row Racing | Toyota | 28.754 | 132.462 |
Official second practice results

=== Final practice ===
Martin Truex Jr. was the fastest in the final practice session with a time of 28.937 seconds and a speed of 131.624 mph (211.828 km/h).

| Pos | No. | Driver | Team | Manufacturer | Time | Speed |
|---|---|---|---|---|---|---|
| 1 | 78 | Martin Truex Jr. | Furniture Row Racing | Toyota | 28.937 | 131.624 |
| 2 | 4 | Kevin Harvick | Stewart–Haas Racing | Ford | 28.952 | 131.556 |
| 3 | 18 | Kyle Busch | Joe Gibbs Racing | Toyota | 28.967 | 131.488 |
Official final practice results

== Race ==
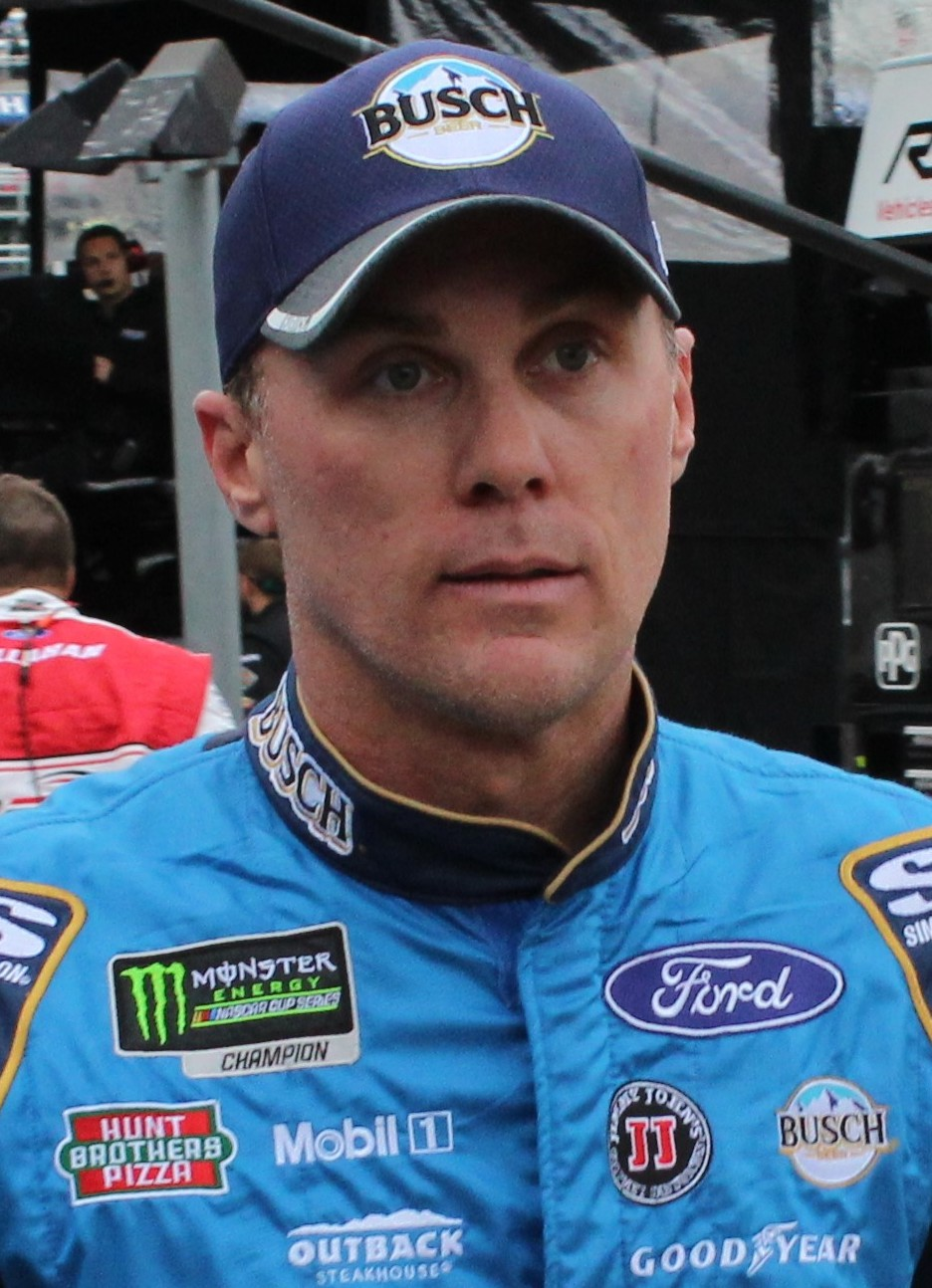
Kevin Harvick won the race.

=== Stage Results ===
Stage 1 Laps: 75

| Pos | No | Driver | Team | Manufacturer | Points |
|---|---|---|---|---|---|
| 1 | 78 | Martin Truex Jr. | Furniture Row Racing | Toyota | 10 |
| 2 | 9 | Chase Elliott | Hendrick Motorsports | Chevrolet | 9 |
| 3 | 48 | Jimmie Johnson | Hendrick Motorsports | Chevrolet | 8 |
| 4 | 41 | Kurt Busch | Stewart–Haas Racing | Ford | 7 |
| 5 | 12 | Ryan Blaney | Team Penske | Ford | 6 |
| 6 | 18 | Kyle Busch | Joe Gibbs Racing | Toyota | 5 |
| 7 | 4 | Kevin Harvick | Stewart–Haas Racing | Ford | 4 |
| 8 | 14 | Clint Bowyer | Stewart–Haas Racing | Ford | 3 |
| 9 | 22 | Joey Logano | Team Penske | Ford | 2 |
| 10 | 10 | Aric Almirola | Stewart–Haas Racing | Ford | 1 |
Official stage one results

Stage 2 Laps: 75

| Pos | No | Driver | Team | Manufacturer | Points |
|---|---|---|---|---|---|
| 1 | 9 | Chase Elliott | Hendrick Motorsports | Chevrolet | 10 |
| 2 | 41 | Kurt Busch | Stewart–Haas Racing | Ford | 9 |
| 3 | 78 | Martin Truex Jr. | Furniture Row Racing | Toyota | 8 |
| 4 | 4 | Kevin Harvick | Stewart–Haas Racing | Ford | 7 |
| 5 | 10 | Aric Almirola | Stewart–Haas Racing | Ford | 6 |
| 6 | 18 | Kyle Busch | Joe Gibbs Racing | Toyota | 5 |
| 7 | 14 | Clint Bowyer | Stewart–Haas Racing | Ford | 4 |
| 8 | 48 | Jimmie Johnson | Hendrick Motorsports | Chevrolet | 3 |
| 9 | 12 | Ryan Blaney | Team Penske | Ford | 2 |
| 10 | 22 | Joey Logano | Team Penske | Ford | 1 |
Official stage two results

=== Final Stage Results ===
Stage 3 Laps: 151

| Pos | Grid | No | Driver | Team | Manufacturer | Laps |
|---|---|---|---|---|---|---|
| 1 | 14 | 4 | Kevin Harivck | Stewart–Haas Racing | Ford | 301 |
| 2 | 3 | 18 | Kyle Busch | Joe Gibbs Racing | Toyota | 301 |
| 3 | 13 | 10 | Aric Almirola | Stewart–Haas Racing | Ford | 301 |
| 4 | 2 | 78 | Martin Truex Jr. | Furniture Row Racing | Toyota | 301 |
| 5 | 10 | 9 | Chase Elliott | Hendrick Motorsports | Chevrolet | 301 |
| 6 | 18 | 31 | Ryan Newman | Richard Childress Racing | Chevrolet | 301 |
| 7 | 5 | 12 | Ryan Blaney | Team Penske | Ford | 301 |
| 8 | 1 | 41 | Kurt Busch | Stewart–Haas Racing | Ford | 301 |
| 9 | 19 | 22 | Joey Logano | Team Penske | Ford | 301 |
| 10 | 21 | 48 | Jimmie Johnson | Hendrick Motorsports | Chevrolet | 301 |
| 11 | 8 | 88 | Alex Bowman | Hendrick Motorsports | Chevrolet | 301 |
| 12 | 20 | 42 | Kyle Larson | Chip Ganassi Racing | Chevrolet | 301 |
| 13 | 4 | 11 | Denny Hamlin | Joe Gibbs Racing | Toyota | 301 |
| 14 | 11 | 24 | William Byron (R) | Hendrick Motorsports | Chevrolet | 301 |
| 15 | 31 | 6 | Matt Kenseth | Roush Fenway Racing | Ford | 301 |
| 16 | 7 | 20 | Erik Jones | Joe Gibbs Racing | Toyota | 301 |
| 17 | 12 | 21 | Paul Menard | Wood Brothers Racing | Ford | 301 |
| 18 | 22 | 1 | Jamie McMurray | Chip Ganassi Racing | Chevrolet | 301 |
| 19 | 26 | 95 | Kasey Kahne | Leavine Family Racing | Chevrolet | 301 |
| 20 | 24 | 37 | Chris Buescher | JTG Daugherty Racing | Chevrolet | 300 |
| 21 | 17 | 3 | Austin Dillon | Richard Childress Racing | Chevrolet | 300 |
| 22 | 9 | 19 | Daniel Suárez | Joe Gibbs Racing | Toyota | 300 |
| 23 | 25 | 13 | Ty Dillon | Germain Racing | Chevrolet | 300 |
| 24 | 27 | 43 | Bubba Wallace (R) | Richard Petty Motorsports | Chevrolet | 299 |
| 25 | 32 | 15 | Ross Chastain (i) | Premium Motorsports | Chevrolet | 298 |
| 26 | 29 | 34 | Michael McDowell | Front Row Motorsports | Ford | 298 |
| 27 | 33 | 72 | Corey LaJoie | TriStar Motorsports | Chevrolet | 298 |
| 28 | 28 | 32 | Matt DiBenedetto | Go Fas Racing | Ford | 298 |
| 29 | 30 | 38 | David Ragan | Front Row Motorsports | Ford | 298 |
| 30 | 23 | 17 | Ricky Stenhouse Jr. | Roush Fenway Racing | Ford | 296 |
| 31 | 35 | 99 | Kyle Weatherman | StarCom Racing | Chevrolet | 294 |
| 32 | 6 | 2 | Brad Keselowski | Team Penske | Ford | 293 |
| 33 | 37 | 23 | Blake Jones | BK Racing | Toyota | 289 |
| 34 | 36 | 51 | B. J. McLeod (i) | Rick Ware Racing | Chevrolet | 267 |
| 35 | 15 | 14 | Clint Bowyer | Stewart–Haas Racing | Ford | 255 |
| 36 | 16 | 47 | A. J. Allmendinger | JTG Daugherty Racing | Chevrolet | 19 |
| 37 | 34 | 00 | Landon Cassill | StarCom Racing | Chevrolet | 13 |
Official race results

=== Race statistics ===
- Lead changes: 7 among different drivers
- Cautions/Laps: 7 for 31
- Red flags: 0
- Time of race: 2 hours, 52 minutes and 56 seconds
- Average speed: 110.490 miles per hour (177.816 km/h)

== Media ==
=== Television ===
NBC Sports covered the race on the television side. Steve Letarte, four-time and all-time Loudon winner Jeff Burton and Dale Earnhardt Jr. had the call in the booth for the race as part of an NBC Special Analyst Broadcast. Rick Allen, Parker Kligerman, Marty Snider and Kelli Stavast reported from pit lane during the race.

NBCSN
| Booth announcers | Pit reporters |
|---|---|
| Play-by-Play Announcer: Steve Letarte; Color-commentator: Jeff Burton; Color-commentator: Dale Earnhardt Jr. | Rick Allen; Parker Kligerman; Marty Snider; Kelli Stavast |

=== Radio ===
PRN had the radio call for the race, which was simulcast on Sirius XM NASCAR Radio.

PRN
| Booth announcers | Turn announcers | Pit reporters |
|---|---|---|
| Lead announcer: Doug Rice; Announcer: Mark Garrow | Turns 1 & 2: Rob Albright; Turns 3 & 4: Pat Patterson | Brad Gillie; Brett McMillan; Jim Noble; Steve Richards |

== Standings after the race ==
Drivers' Championship standings

| | Pos | Driver | Points |
|---|---|---|---|
| | 1 | Kyle Busch | 844 |
| | 2 | Kevin Harvick | 791 (–53) |
| | 3 | Martin Truex Jr. | 740 (–104) |
| | 4 | Joey Logano | 679 (–165) |
| 2 | 5 | Kurt Busch | 646 (–198) |
| | 6 | Clint Bowyer | 638 (–206) |
| 2 | 7 | Brad Keselowski | 635 (–209) |
| | 8 | Kyle Larson | 606 (–238) |
| 1 | 9 | Ryan Blaney | 584 (–260) |
| 1 | 10 | Denny Hamlin | 583 (–261) |
| | 11 | Aric Almirola | 575 (–269) |
| | 12 | Jimmie Johnson | 522 (–322) |
| 1 | 13 | Chase Elliott | 520 (–324) |
| 1 | 14 | Erik Jones | 501 (–343) |
| | 15 | Alex Bowman | 453 (–391) |
| | 16 | Ricky Stenhouse Jr. | 425 (–419) |
Official driver's standings

Manufacturers' Championship standings

| Pos | Manufacturer | Points |
|---|---|---|
| 1 | Toyota | 735 |
| 2 | Ford | 719 (–16) |
| 3 | Chevrolet | 641 (–94) |
Official manufacturers' standings

- Note: Only the first 16 positions are included for the driver standings.
- . – Driver has clinched a position in the Monster Energy NASCAR Cup Series playoffs.

| Previous race: 2018 Quaker State 400 | Monster Energy NASCAR Cup Series; 2018 season | Next race: 2018 Gander Outdoors 400 |
