= 2018 Consumers Energy 400 =

Race details
- Race 23 of 36 in the 2018 Monster Energy NASCAR Cup Series
- Date: August 12, 2018
- Location: Michigan International Speedway in Brooklyn, Michigan
- Course: Permanent racing facility
- Course length: 2 miles (3.2 km)
- Distance: 200 laps, 400 mi (640 km)
- Average speed: 140.474 miles per hour (226.071 km/h)

Pole position
| Driver | Denny Hamlin | Joe Gibbs Racing |
- Time: 35.504

Most laps led
| Driver | Kevin Harvick | Stewart–Haas Racing |
- Laps: 108

Winner
| No. 4 | Kevin Harvick | Stewart–Haas Racing |

Television in the United States
- Network: NBCSN
- Announcers: Rick Allen, Jeff Burton, Steve Letarte and Dale Earnhardt Jr.
- Nielsen ratings: 1.62 (Overnight)

Radio in the United States
- Radio: MRN
- Booth announcers: Joe Moore, Jeff Striegle and Rusty Wallace
- Turn announcers: Dave Moody (1 & 2) and Kurt Becker (3 & 4)

The 2018 Consumers Energy 400 is a Monster Energy NASCAR Cup Series race held on August 12, 2018 at Michigan International Speedway in Brooklyn, Michigan. Contested over 200 laps on the two-mile (3.2 km) D-shaped oval, it is the 23rd race of the 2018 Monster Energy NASCAR Cup Series season.

== Report ==
=== Background ===
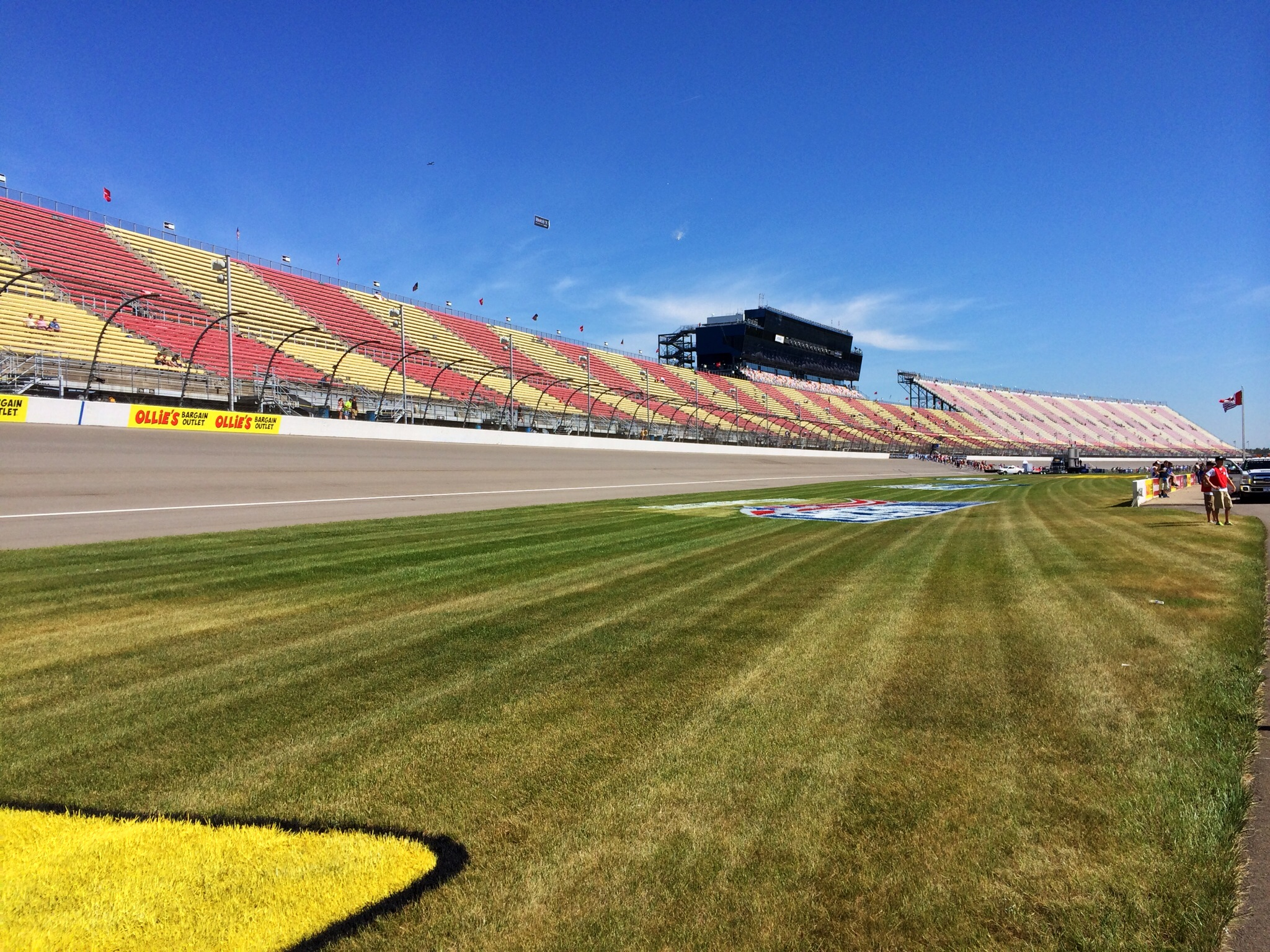
Michigan International Speedway

Michigan International Speedway (MIS) is a two-mile (3.2 km) moderate-banked D-shaped speedway located off U.S. Highway 12 on more than 1,400 acres (5.7 km^{2}) approximately four miles (6.4 km) south of the village of Brooklyn, in the scenic Irish Hills area of southeastern Michigan. The track is used primarily for NASCAR events. It is sometimes known as a "sister track" to Texas World Speedway, and was used as the basis of Auto Club Speedway. The track is owned by International Speedway Corporation (ISC). Michigan International Speedway is recognized as one of motorsports' premier facilities because of its wide racing surface and high banking (by open-wheel standards; the 18-degree banking is modest by stock car standards). Michigan is the fastest track in NASCAR due to its wide, sweeping corners and long straightaways; typical qualifying speeds are in excess of 200 mph (320 km/h) and corner entry speeds are anywhere from 215 to 220 mph (346 to 354 km/h) after the 2012 repaving of the track.

==== Entry list ====
| No. | Driver | Team | Manufacturer |
|---|---|---|---|
| 00 | Landon Cassill | StarCom Racing | Chevrolet |
| 1 | Jamie McMurray | Chip Ganassi Racing | Chevrolet |
| 2 | Brad Keselowski | Team Penske | Ford |
| 3 | Austin Dillon | Richard Childress Racing | Chevrolet |
| 4 | Kevin Harvick | Stewart–Haas Racing | Ford |
| 6 | Trevor Bayne | Roush Fenway Racing | Ford |
| 7 | Garrett Smithley (i) | Premium Motorsports | Chevrolet |
| 9 | Chase Elliott | Hendrick Motorsports | Chevrolet |
| 10 | Aric Almirola | Stewart–Haas Racing | Ford |
| 11 | Denny Hamlin | Joe Gibbs Racing | Toyota |
| 12 | Ryan Blaney | Team Penske | Ford |
| 13 | Ty Dillon | Germain Racing | Chevrolet |
| 14 | Clint Bowyer | Stewart–Haas Racing | Ford |
| 15 | Ross Chastain (i) | Premium Motorsports | Chevrolet |
| 17 | Ricky Stenhouse Jr. | Roush Fenway Racing | Ford |
| 18 | Kyle Busch | Joe Gibbs Racing | Toyota |
| 19 | Daniel Suárez | Joe Gibbs Racing | Toyota |
| 20 | Erik Jones | Joe Gibbs Racing | Toyota |
| 21 | Paul Menard | Wood Brothers Racing | Ford |
| 22 | Joey Logano | Team Penske | Ford |
| 23 | Blake Jones | BK Racing | Toyota |
| 24 | William Byron (R) | Hendrick Motorsports | Chevrolet |
| 31 | Ryan Newman | Richard Childress Racing | Chevrolet |
| 32 | Matt DiBenedetto | Go Fas Racing | Ford |
| 34 | Michael McDowell | Front Row Motorsports | Ford |
| 37 | Chris Buescher | JTG Daugherty Racing | Chevrolet |
| 38 | David Ragan | Front Row Motorsports | Ford |
| 41 | Kurt Busch | Stewart–Haas Racing | Ford |
| 42 | Kyle Larson | Chip Ganassi Racing | Chevrolet |
| 43 | Bubba Wallace (R) | Richard Petty Motorsports | Chevrolet |
| 47 | A. J. Allmendinger | JTG Daugherty Racing | Chevrolet |
| 48 | Jimmie Johnson | Hendrick Motorsports | Chevrolet |
| 51 | B. J. McLeod (i) | Rick Ware Racing | Ford |
| 66 | Timmy Hill (i) | MBM Motorsports | Chevrolet |
| 72 | Corey LaJoie | TriStar Motorsports | Chevrolet |
| 78 | Martin Truex Jr. | Furniture Row Racing | Toyota |
| 88 | Alex Bowman | Hendrick Motorsports | Chevrolet |
| 95 | Kasey Kahne | Leavine Family Racing | Chevrolet |
| 96 | Jeffrey Earnhardt | Gaunt Brothers Racing | Toyota |
| 99 | Gray Gaulding | StarCom Racing | Chevrolet |
Official entry list

== First practice ==
Denny Hamlin was the fastest in the first practice session with a time of 35.603 seconds and a speed of 202.230 mph (325.458 km/h).

| Pos | No. | Driver | Team | Manufacturer | Time | Speed |
|---|---|---|---|---|---|---|
| 1 | 11 | Denny Hamlin | Joe Gibbs Racing | Toyota | 35.603 | 202.230 |
| 2 | 41 | Kurt Busch | Stewart–Haas Racing | Ford | 35.661 | 201.901 |
| 3 | 19 | Daniel Suárez | Joe Gibbs Racing | Toyota | 35.670 | 201.850 |
Official first practice results

== Qualifying ==
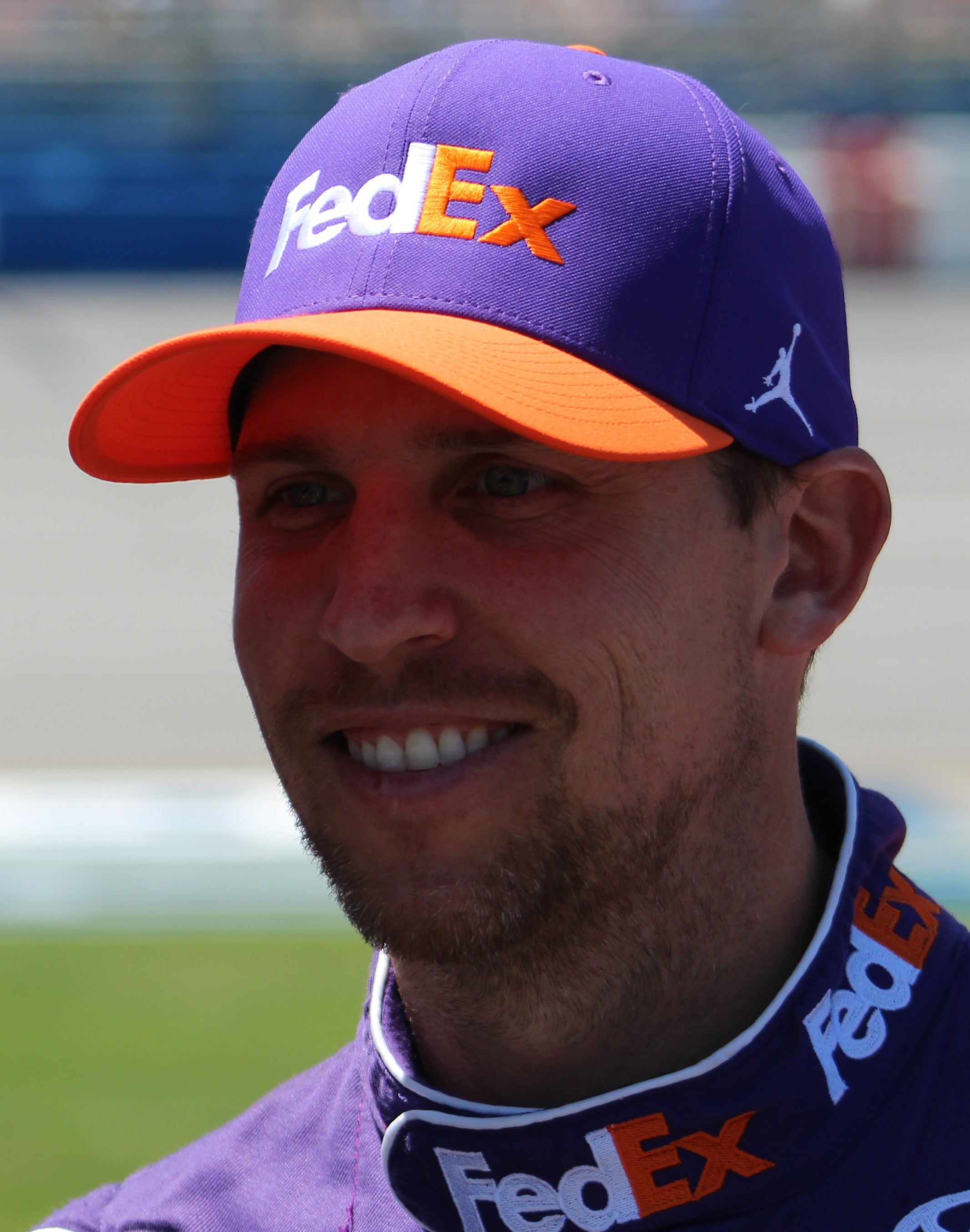
Denny Hamlin won the pole

Denny Hamlin scored the pole for the race with a time of 35.504 and a speed of 202.794 mph (326.365 km/h).

=== Qualifying results ===
| Pos | No. | Driver | Team | Manufacturer | R1 | R2 | R3 |
|---|---|---|---|---|---|---|---|
| 1 | 11 | Denny Hamlin | Joe Gibbs Racing | Toyota | 35.716 | 35.604 | 35.504 |
| 2 | 18 | Kyle Busch | Joe Gibbs Racing | Toyota | 36.107 | 35.682 | 35.515 |
| 3 | 4 | Kevin Harvick | Stewart–Haas Racing | Ford | 36.218 | 35.662 | 35.626 |
| 4 | 20 | Erik Jones | Joe Gibbs Racing | Toyota | 35.945 | 35.750 | 35.678 |
| 5 | 3 | Austin Dillon | Richard Childress Racing | Chevrolet | 36.198 | 35.812 | 35.688 |
| 6 | 31 | Ryan Newman | Richard Childress Racing | Chevrolet | 36.055 | 35.784 | 35.704 |
| 7 | 78 | Martin Truex Jr. | Furniture Row Racing | Toyota | 36.025 | 35.707 | 35.746 |
| 8 | 12 | Ryan Blaney | Team Penske | Ford | 35.932 | 35.836 | 35.766 |
| 9 | 22 | Joey Logano | Team Penske | Ford | 35.830 | 35.762 | 35.780 |
| 10 | 88 | Alex Bowman | Hendrick Motorsports | Chevrolet | 35.827 | 35.715 | 35.788 |
| 11 | 10 | Aric Almirola | Stewart–Haas Racing | Ford | 35.829 | 35.798 | 35.906 |
| 12 | 41 | Kurt Busch | Stewart–Haas Racing | Ford | 35.784 | 35.698 | 35.994 |
| 13 | 17 | Ricky Stenhouse Jr. | Roush Fenway Racing | Ford | 36.145 | 35.849 | — |
| 14 | 21 | Paul Menard | Wood Brothers Racing | Ford | 35.871 | 35.854 | — |
| 15 | 1 | Jamie McMurray | Chip Ganassi Racing | Chevrolet | 36.206 | 35.897 | — |
| 16 | 14 | Clint Bowyer | Stewart–Haas Racing | Ford | 35.844 | 35.952 | — |
| 17 | 42 | Kyle Larson | Chip Ganassi Racing | Chevrolet | 36.159 | 35.987 | — |
| 18 | 2 | Brad Keselowski | Team Penske | Ford | 35.908 | 36.074 | — |
| 19 | 48 | Jimmie Johnson | Hendrick Motorsports | Chevrolet | 36.324 | 36.091 | — |
| 20 | 24 | William Byron (R) | Hendrick Motorsports | Chevrolet | 36.361 | 36.139 | — |
| 21 | 9 | Chase Elliott | Hendrick Motorsports | Chevrolet | 36.142 | 36.167 | — |
| 22 | 43 | Bubba Wallace (R) | Richard Petty Motorsports | Chevrolet | 36.444 | 36.415 | — |
| 23 | 37 | Chris Buescher | JTG Daugherty Racing | Chevrolet | 36.268 | 36.438 | — |
| 24 | 38 | David Ragan | Front Row Motorsports | Ford | 36.457 | 36.467 | — |
| 25 | 47 | A. J. Allmendinger | JTG Daugherty Racing | Chevrolet | 36.483 | — | — |
| 26 | 6 | Trevor Bayne | Roush Fenway Racing | Ford | 36.493 | — | — |
| 27 | 13 | Ty Dillon | Germain Racing | Chevrolet | 36.493 | — | — |
| 28 | 95 | Kasey Kahne | Leavine Family Racing | Chevrolet | 36.495 | — | — |
| 29 | 34 | Michael McDowell | Front Row Motorsports | Ford | 36.639 | — | — |
| 30 | 32 | Matt DiBenedetto | Go Fas Racing | Ford | 36.663 | — | — |
| 31 | 00 | Landon Cassill | StarCom Racing | Chevrolet | 36.816 | — | — |
| 32 | 72 | Corey LaJoie | TriStar Motorsports | Chevrolet | 37.203 | — | — |
| 33 | 51 | B. J. McLeod (i) | Rick Ware Racing | Ford | 37.550 | — | — |
| 34 | 99 | Gray Gaulding | StarCom Racing | Chevrolet | 37.806 | — | — |
| 35 | 15 | Reed Sorenson | Premium Motorsports | Chevrolet | 37.962 | — | — |
| 36 | 7 | Garrett Smithley (i) | Premium Motorsports | Chevrolet | 38.228 | — | — |
| 37 | 66 | Timmy Hill (i) | MBM Motorsports | Chevrolet | 38.783 | — | — |
| 38 | 96 | Jeffrey Earnhardt | Gaunt Brothers Racing | Toyota | 39.119 | — | — |
| 39 | 23 | Blake Jones | BK Racing | Toyota | 39.492 | — | — |
| 40 | 19 | Daniel Suárez | Joe Gibbs Racing | Toyota | 0.000 | — | — |
Official qualifying results

- Reed Sorenson practiced and qualified the No. 15 for Ross Chastain who was in Ohio for the Xfinity Series race.

== Practice (post-qualifying) ==
=== Second practice ===
Erik Jones was the fastest in the second practice session with a time of 35.973 seconds and a speed of 200.150 mph (322.110 km/h).

| Pos | No. | Driver | Team | Manufacturer | Time | Speed |
|---|---|---|---|---|---|---|
| 1 | 20 | Erik Jones | Joe Gibbs Racing | Toyota | 35.973 | 200.150 |
| 2 | 24 | William Byron (R) | Hendrick Motorsports | Chevrolet | 36.058 | 199.678 |
| 3 | 2 | Brad Keselowski | Team Penske | Ford | 36.116 | 199.358 |
Official second practice results

=== Final practice ===
Joey Logano was the fastest in the final practice session with a time of 36.441 seconds and a speed of 197.580 mph (317.974 km/h).

| Pos | No. | Driver | Team | Manufacturer | Time | Speed |
|---|---|---|---|---|---|---|
| 1 | 22 | Joey Logano | Team Penske | Ford | 36.441 | 197.580 |
| 2 | 18 | Kyle Busch | Joe Gibbs Racing | Toyota | 36.452 | 197.520 |
| 3 | 88 | Alex Bowman | Hendrick Motorsports | Chevrolet | 36.489 | 197.320 |
Official final practice results

== Race ==
=== Stage Results ===
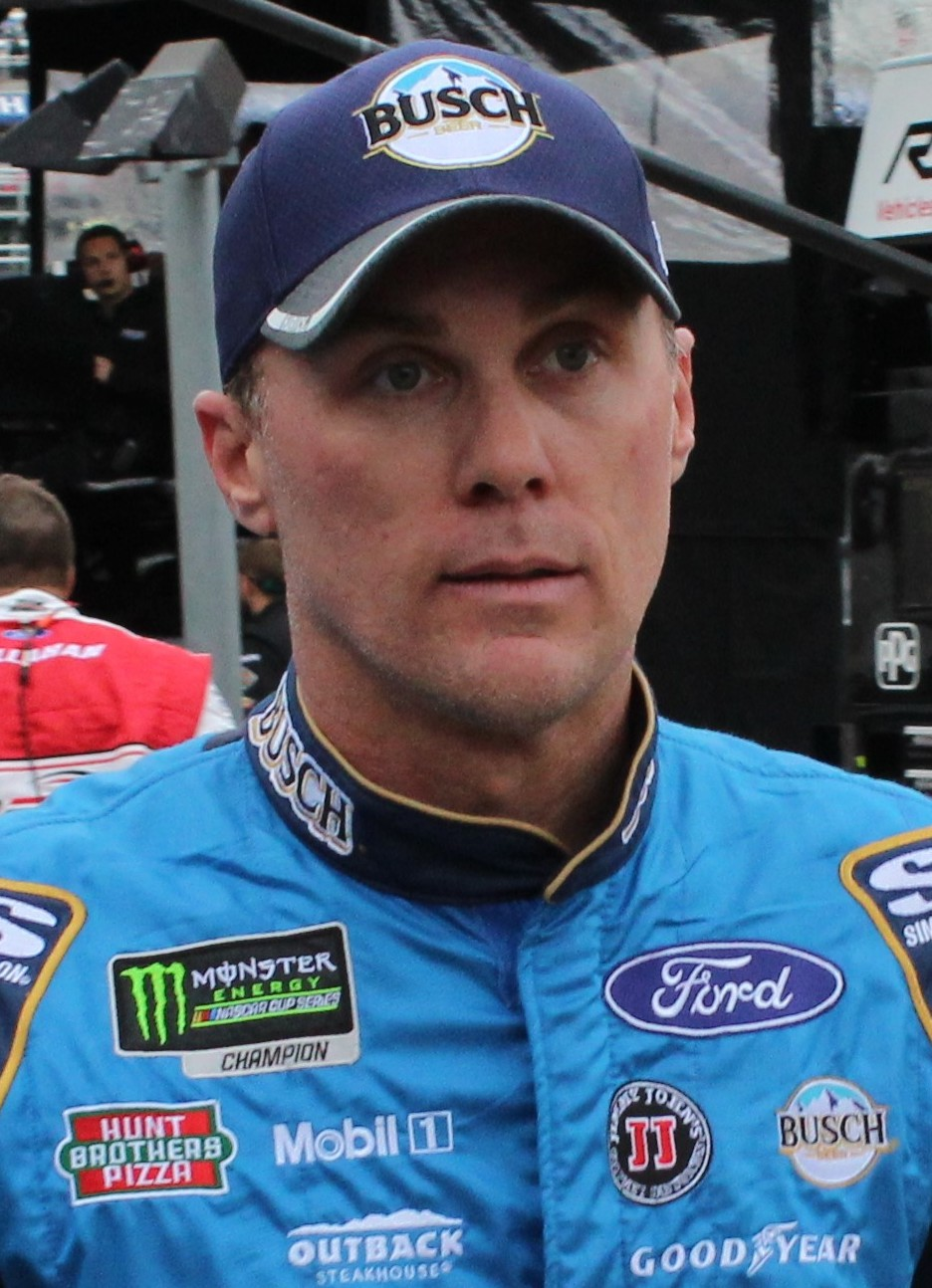
Kevin Harvick swept all 3 stages in this race.

Stage 1 Laps: 60

| Pos | No | Driver | Team | Manufacturer | Points |
|---|---|---|---|---|---|
| 1 | 4 | Kevin Harvick | Stewart–Haas Racing | Ford | 10 |
| 2 | 18 | Kyle Busch | Joe Gibbs Racing | Toyota | 9 |
| 3 | 12 | Ryan Blaney | Team Penske | Ford | 8 |
| 4 | 41 | Kurt Busch | Stewart–Haas Racing | Ford | 7 |
| 5 | 78 | Martin Truex Jr. | Furniture Row Racing | Toyota | 6 |
| 6 | 11 | Denny Hamlin | Joe Gibbs Racing | Toyota | 5 |
| 7 | 10 | Aric Almirola | Stewart–Haas Racing | Ford | 4 |
| 8 | 31 | Ryan Newman | Richard Childress Racing | Chevrolet | 3 |
| 9 | 2 | Brad Keselowski | Team Penske | Ford | 2 |
| 10 | 88 | Alex Bowman | Hendrick Motorsports | Chevrolet | 1 |
Official stage one results

Stage 2 Laps: 60

| Pos | No | Driver | Team | Manufacturer | Points |
|---|---|---|---|---|---|
| 1 | 4 | Kevin Harvick | Stewart–Haas Racing | Ford | 10 |
| 2 | 18 | Kyle Busch | Joe Gibbs Racing | Toyota | 9 |
| 3 | 12 | Ryan Blaney | Team Penske | Ford | 8 |
| 4 | 41 | Kurt Busch | Stewart–Haas Racing | Ford | 7 |
| 5 | 3 | Austin Dillon | Richard Childress Racing | Chevrolet | 6 |
| 6 | 22 | Joey Logano | Team Penske | Ford | 5 |
| 7 | 14 | Clint Bowyer | Stewart–Haas Racing | Ford | 4 |
| 8 | 10 | Aric Almirola | Stewart–Haas Racing | Ford | 3 |
| 9 | 2 | Brad Keselowski | Team Penske | Ford | 2 |
| 10 | 42 | Kyle Larson | Chip Ganassi Racing | Chevrolet | 1 |
Official stage two results

=== Final Stage Results ===
Stage 3 Laps: 80

| Pos | Grid | No | Driver | Team | Manufacturer | Laps | Points |
|---|---|---|---|---|---|---|---|
| 1 | 3 | 4 | Kevin Harvick | Stewart–Haas Racing | Ford | 200 | 60 |
| 2 | 18 | 2 | Brad Keselowski | Team Penske | Ford | 200 | 39 |
| 3 | 2 | 18 | Kyle Busch | Joe Gibbs Racing | Toyota | 200 | 52 |
| 4 | 5 | 3 | Austin Dillon | Richard Childress Racing | Chevrolet | 200 | 39 |
| 5 | 8 | 12 | Ryan Blaney | Team Penske | Ford | 200 | 48 |
| 6 | 12 | 41 | Kurt Busch | Stewart–Haas Racing | Ford | 200 | 45 |
| 7 | 11 | 10 | Aric Almirola | Stewart–Haas Racing | Ford | 200 | 37 |
| 8 | 1 | 11 | Denny Hamlin | Joe Gibbs Racing | Toyota | 200 | 34 |
| 9 | 21 | 9 | Chase Elliott | Hendrick Motorsports | Chevrolet | 200 | 28 |
| 10 | 9 | 22 | Joey Logano | Team Penske | Ford | 200 | 32 |
| 11 | 40 | 19 | Daniel Suárez | Joe Gibbs Racing | Toyota | 200 | 26 |
| 12 | 16 | 14 | Clint Bowyer | Stewart–Haas Racing | Ford | 200 | 29 |
| 13 | 4 | 20 | Erik Jones | Joe Gibbs Racing | Toyota | 200 | 24 |
| 14 | 7 | 78 | Martin Truex Jr. | Furniture Row Racing | Toyota | 200 | 29 |
| 15 | 6 | 31 | Ryan Newman | Richard Childress Racing | Chevrolet | 200 | 25 |
| 16 | 14 | 21 | Paul Menard | Wood Brothers Racing | Ford | 200 | 21 |
| 17 | 17 | 42 | Kyle Larson | Chip Ganassi Racing | Chevrolet | 200 | 21 |
| 18 | 13 | 17 | Ricky Stenhouse Jr. | Roush Fenway Racing | Ford | 200 | 19 |
| 19 | 10 | 88 | Alex Bowman | Hendrick Motorsports | Chevrolet | 200 | 19 |
| 20 | 23 | 37 | Chris Buescher | JTG Daugherty Racing | Chevrolet | 200 | 17 |
| 21 | 15 | 1 | Jamie McMurray | Chip Ganassi Racing | Chevrolet | 200 | 16 |
| 22 | 25 | 47 | A. J. Allmendinger | JTG Daugherty Racing | Chevrolet | 199 | 15 |
| 23 | 22 | 43 | Bubba Wallace (R) | Richard Petty Motorsports | Chevrolet | 199 | 14 |
| 24 | 30 | 32 | Matt DiBenedetto | Go Fas Racing | Ford | 199 | 13 |
| 25 | 29 | 34 | Michael McDowell | Front Row Motorsports | Ford | 199 | 12 |
| 26 | 28 | 95 | Kasey Kahne | Leavine Family Racing | Chevrolet | 199 | 11 |
| 27 | 24 | 38 | David Ragan | Front Row Motorsports | Ford | 199 | 10 |
| 28 | 19 | 48 | Jimmie Johnson | Hendrick Motorsports | Chevrolet | 198 | 9 |
| 29 | 31 | 00 | Landon Cassill | StarCom Racing | Chevrolet | 197 | 8 |
| 30 | 39 | 23 | Blake Jones | BK Racing | Toyota | 194 | 7 |
| 31 | 33 | 51 | B. J. McLeod (i) | Rick Ware Racing | Ford | 194 | 0 |
| 32 | 36 | 7 | Garrett Smithley (i) | Premium Motorsports | Chevrolet | 193 | 0 |
| 33 | 34 | 99 | Gray Gaulding | StarCom Racing | Chevrolet | 191 | 4 |
| 34 | 26 | 6 | Trevor Bayne | Roush Fenway Racing | Ford | 189 | 3 |
| 35 | 35 | 15 | Ross Chastain (i) | Premium Motorsports | Chevrolet | 187 | 0 |
| 36 | 20 | 24 | William Byron (R) | Hendrick Motorsports | Chevrolet | 187 | 1 |
| 37 | 37 | 66 | Timmy Hill (i) | MBM Motorsports | Chevrolet | 138 | 0 |
| 38 | 27 | 13 | Ty Dillon | Germain Racing | Chevrolet | 131 | 1 |
| 39 | 38 | 96 | Jeffrey Earnhardt | Gaunt Brothers Racing | Toyota | 102 | 1 |
| 40 | 32 | 72 | Corey LaJoie | TriStar Motorsports | Chevrolet | 37 | 1 |
Official race results

=== Race statistics ===
- Lead changes: 9 among different drivers
- Cautions/Laps: 8 for 37
- Red flags: 0
- Time of race: 2 hours, 50 minutes and 51 seconds
- Average speed: 140.474 miles per hour (226.071 km/h)

== Media ==
=== Television ===
NBC Sports covered the race on the television side. Rick Allen, Jeff Burton, Steve Letarte and two-time Michigan winner, Dale Earnhardt Jr. had the call in the booth for the race. Dave Burns, Marty Snider and Kelli Stavast reported from pit lane during the race.

NBCSN
| Booth announcers | Pit reporters |
|---|---|
| Lap-by-lap: Rick Allen; Color-commentator: Jeff Burton; Color-commentator: Steve Letarte; Color-commentator: Dale Earnhardt Jr. | Dave Burns; Marty Snider; Kelli Stavast |

=== Radio ===
Motor Racing Network had the radio call for the race, which was simulcast on Sirius XM NASCAR Radio.

MRN
| Booth announcers | Turn announcers | Pit reporters |
|---|---|---|
| Lead announcer: Joe Moore; Announcer: Jeff Striegle; Announcer: Rusty Wallace | Turns 1 & 2: Dave Moody; Turns 3 & 4: Kyle Rickey | Alex Hayden; Woody Cain; Kim Coon; Glenn Jarrett |

== Standings after the race ==
Drivers' Championship standings

| | Pos | Driver | Points |
|---|---|---|---|
| | 1 | Kyle Busch | 986 |
| | 2 | Kevin Harvick | 924 (–62) |
| | 3 | Martin Truex Jr. | 842 (–144) |
| | 4 | Kurt Busch | 750 (–236) |
| | 5 | Clint Bowyer | 732 (–254) |
| | 6 | Joey Logano | 723 (–263) |
| | 7 | Brad Keselowski | 709 (–277) |
| 2 | 8 | Ryan Blaney | 687 (–299) |
| | 9 | Denny Hamlin | 684 (–302) |
| 2 | 10 | Kyle Larson | 681 (–305) |
| | 11 | Chase Elliott | 647 (–339) |
| | 12 | Aric Almirola | 639 (–347) |
| | 13 | Erik Jones | 596 (–390) |
| | 14 | Jimmie Johnson | 572 (–414) |
| | 15 | Alex Bowman | 542 (–444) |
| | 16 | Ricky Stenhouse Jr. | 480 (–506) |
Official driver's standings

Manufacturers' Championship standings

| Pos | Manufacturer | Points |
|---|---|---|
| 1 | Toyota | 844 |
| 2 | Ford | 815 (–29) |
| 3 | Chevrolet | 748 (–96) |
Official manufacturers' standings

- Note: Only the first 16 positions are included for the driver standings.
- . – Driver has clinched a position in the Monster Energy NASCAR Cup Series playoffs.

| Previous race: 2018 Go Bowling at The Glen | Monster Energy NASCAR Cup Series; 2018 season | Next race: 2018 Bass Pro Shops NRA Night Race |
