= 2018 Gander Outdoors 400 =

2018 Gander Outdoors 400 may refer to two races held during the 2018 Monster Energy NASCAR Cup Series:

- 2018 Gander Outdoors 400 (Pocono), a race held at Pocono Raceway on July 29.
- 2018 Gander Outdoors 400 (Dover), a race held at Dover International Speedway on October 7.
