= Blake Jones =

American racing driver (born 1997)

- Born: Blake C. Jones; January 12, 1997 (age 29); Sevierville, Tennessee, U.S.
- Achievements: Youngest winner ever at Talladega Superspeedway (18)

NASCAR Cup Series career
- 5 races run over 2 years
- 2019 position: 38th
- Best finish: 38th (2019)
- First race: 2018 Foxwoods Resort Casino 301 (Loudon)
- Last race: 2019 1000Bulbs.com 500 (Talladega)
Wins	Top tens	Poles
0	0	0

NASCAR O'Reilly Auto Parts Series career
- 5 races run over 2 years
- 2018 position: 105th
- Best finish: 77th (2016)
- First race: 2016 VisitMyrtleBeach.com 300 (Kentucky)
- Last race: 2018 Alsco 300 (Kentucky)
Wins	Top tens	Poles
0	0	0
- Statistics up to date as of November 17, 2019.

Blake C. Jones (born January 12, 1997) is an American professional stock car racing driver. He last competed part-time in the Monster Energy NASCAR Cup Series, driving the No. 77 Chevrolet Camaro ZL1 for Spire Motorsports.

== Racing career ==
=== Monster Energy Cup Series ===
In July 2018, Jones made his Monster Energy NASCAR Cup Series debut at Loudon, where he drove the No. 23 Toyota Camry for BK Racing. He finished 33rd.

On September 29, 2019, Jones was announced to drive the Spire Motorsports No. 77 Chevrolet Camaro ZL1 at the October Talladega race.

=== NASCAR Xfinity Series ===
Jones made his NASCAR debut in 2016, driving the No. 15 Ford Mustang GT for B. J. McLeod Motorsports. This was his only race in the season.

In 2018, Jones returned to NASCAR with B. J. McLeod Motorsports. He participated in four races, with a best finish of 24th at Chicagoland.

== Motorsports career results ==
=== NASCAR ===
(key) (Bold – Pole position awarded by qualifying time. Italics – Pole position earned by points standings or practice time. * – Most laps led.)

==== Monster Energy Cup Series ====
Monster Energy NASCAR Cup Series results
Year	Team	No.	Make	1	2	3	4	5	6	7	8	9	10	11	12	13	14	15	16	17	18	19	20	21	22	23	24	25	26	27	28	29	30	31	32	33	34	35	36	MENCC	Pts	Ref
2018	BK Racing	23	Toyota	DAY	ATL	LVS	PHO	CAL	MAR	TEX	BRI	RCH	TAL	DOV	KAN	CLT	POC	MCH	SON	CHI	DAY	KEN	NHA; 33	POC	GLN	MCH; 30	BRI; 27	DAR	IND	LVS	RCH	CLT	DOV	TAL	KAN	MAR	TEX	PHO	HOM	40th	21	
2019	Spire Motorsports	77	Chevy	DAY	ATL	LVS	PHO	CAL	MAR	TEX	BRI	RCH	TAL	DOV	KAN	CLT	POC	MCH	SON	CHI	DAY	KEN	NHA	POC	GLN	MCH	BRI	DAR	IND	LVS	RCH	CLT	DOV	TAL; 31	KAN	MAR	TEX	PHO	HOM	38th	6	

==== Xfinity Series ====
NASCAR Xfinity Series results
Year	Team	No.	Make	1	2	3	4	5	6	7	8	9	10	11	12	13	14	15	16	17	18	19	20	21	22	23	24	25	26	27	28	29	30	31	32	33	NXSC	Pts	Ref
2016	B. J. McLeod Motorsports	15	Ford	DAY	ATL	LVS	PHO	CAL	TEX	BRI	RCH	TAL	DOV	CLT	POC	MCH	IOW	DAY	KEN	NHA	IND	IOW	GLN	MOH	BRI	ROA	DAR	RCH	CHI	KEN; 35	DOV	CLT	KAN	TEX	PHO	HOM	77th	6	
2018	B. J. McLeod Motorsports	8	Chevy	DAY	ATL	LVS	PHO	CAL	TEX	BRI	RCH	TAL	DOV	CLT	POC	MCH	IOW; 27	CHI; 24																			105th	0^{1}	
2018	B. J. McLeod Motorsports	78	Toyota																DAY; 37																		105th	0^{1}	
2018	B. J. McLeod Motorsports	78	Chevy																	KEN; 25	NHA	IOW	GLN	MOH	BRI	ROA	DAR	IND	LVS	RCH	CLT	DOV	KAN	TEX	PHO	HOM	105th	0^{1}	

==== K&N Pro Series East ====
NASCAR K&N Pro Series East results
Year	Team	No.	Make	1	2	3	4	5	6	7	8	9	10	11	12	13	14	NKNPSEC	Pts	Ref
2012	Teddy Jones Racing	80	Chevy	BRI; 29	GRE; 23	RCH	IOW	BGS	JFC	LGY	CNB	COL	IOW	NHA	DOV	GRE	CAR	54th	36	
2013	Teddy Jones Racing	80	Chevy	BRI; 36	GRE	FIF	RCH	BGS	IOW	LGY	COL	IOW	VIR	GRE	NHA	DOV	RAL	77th	8	

=== ARCA Menards Series ===
(key) (Bold – Pole position awarded by qualifying time. Italics – Pole position earned by points standings or practice time. * – Most laps led.)

ARCA Racing Series results
Year	Team	No.	Make	1	2	3	4	5	6	7	8	9	10	11	12	13	14	15	16	17	18	19	20	ARSC	Pts	Ref
2015	Cunningham Motorsports	22	Dodge	DAY; 17	MOB	NSH	SLM	TAL; 1	TOL	NJE	POC	MCH; 15	CHI	WIN										27th	1055	
2015	Lira Motorsports	38	Ford												IOW; 7	IRP	POC							27th	1055	
2015	Lira Motorsports	58	Ford															BLN; 8	ISF	DSF	SLM; 19	KEN	KAN	27th	1055	
2016	Cunningham Motorsports	22	Dodge	DAY	NSH	SLM; 5	TAL	TOL	NJE	POC	MCH	MAD	WIN	IOW	IRP	POC	BLN	ISF	DSF	SLM	CHI	KEN	KAN	91st	205	

=== CARS Super Late Model Tour ===
(key)

CARS Super Late Model Tour results
Year	Team	No.	Make	1	2	3	4	5	6	7	8	9	10	11	12	13	CSLMTC	Pts	Ref
2017	Wade Lopez	96	Ford	CON	DOM	DOM	HCY	HCY	BRI; 23	AND	ROU	TCM	ROU	HCY	CON	SBO	50th	10	

^{*} Season still in progress
^{1} Ineligible for series points
