= 2019 1000Bulbs.com 500 =

Race details
- Race 31 of 36 in the 2019 Monster Energy NASCAR Cup Series
- Date: October 13–14, 2019
- Location: Talladega Superspeedway in Lincoln, Alabama
- Course: Permanent racing facility
- Course length: 2.66 miles (4.28 km)
- Distance: 188 laps, 500.08 mi (804.64 km)
- Average speed: 136.644 miles per hour (219.907 km/h)

Pole position
Driver	Chase Elliott	Hendrick Motorsports
- Time: 49.692

Most laps led
Driver	Ryan Blaney	Team Penske
- Laps: 35

Winner
No. 12	Ryan Blaney	Team Penske

Television in the United States
- Network: NBC(Sunday)/NBCSN(Monday)
- Announcers: Rick Allen, Jeff Burton, Dale Earnhardt Jr. (booth) and Steve Letarte (NBC Peacock Pitbox)
- Nielsen ratings: 1.536 million

Radio in the United States
- Radio: MRN
- Booth announcers: Alex Hayden, Jeff Striegle and Rusty Wallace
- Turn announcers: Dave Moody (1 & 2), Mike Bagley (Backstretch) and Dan Hubbard (3 & 4)

The 2019 1000Bulbs.com 500 was a Monster Energy NASCAR Cup Series race that was held on October 13–14, 2019 at Talladega Superspeedway in Lincoln, Alabama. Contested over 188 laps on the 2.66 mile (4.2 km) superspeedway, it was the 31st race of the 2019 Monster Energy NASCAR Cup Series season, the fifth race of the Playoffs, and second race of the Round of 12. Ryan Blaney scored his first win of the season and third of his career edging out Ryan Newman by .007 seconds becoming the 6th closest finish in NASCAR history.

== Report ==
=== Background ===
Talladega Superspeedway, the track where the race was held.

Talladega Superspeedway, originally known as Alabama International Motor Superspeedway (AIMS), is a motorsports complex located north of Talladega, Alabama. It is located on the former Anniston Air Force Base in the small city of Lincoln. The track is a tri-oval and was constructed in the 1960s by the International Speedway Corporation, a business controlled by the France family. Talladega is most known for its steep banking and the unique location of the start/finish line that's located just past the exit to pit road. The track currently hosts the NASCAR series such as the Monster Energy NASCAR Cup Series, Xfinity Series and the Gander Outdoors Truck Series. Talladega is the longest NASCAR oval with a length of 2.66-mile-long (4.28 km) tri-oval like the Daytona International Speedway, which also is a 2.5-mile-long (4 km) tri-oval.

==== Entry list ====
- (i) denotes driver who are ineligible for series driver points.
- (R) denotes rookie driver.

No.	Driver	Team	Manufacturer
00	Landon Cassill (i)	StarCom Racing	Chevrolet
1	Kurt Busch	Chip Ganassi Racing	Chevrolet
2	Brad Keselowski	Team Penske	Ford
3	Austin Dillon	Richard Childress Racing	Chevrolet
4	Kevin Harvick	Stewart-Haas Racing	Ford
6	Ryan Newman	Roush Fenway Racing	Ford
8	Daniel Hemric (R)	Richard Childress Racing	Chevrolet
9	Chase Elliott	Hendrick Motorsports	Chevrolet
10	Aric Almirola	Stewart-Haas Racing	Ford
11	Denny Hamlin	Joe Gibbs Racing	Toyota
12	Ryan Blaney	Team Penske	Ford
13	Ty Dillon	Germain Racing	Chevrolet
14	Clint Bowyer	Stewart-Haas Racing	Ford
15	Ross Chastain (i)	Premium Motorsports	Chevrolet
17	Ricky Stenhouse Jr.	Roush Fenway Racing	Ford
18	Kyle Busch	Joe Gibbs Racing	Toyota
19	Martin Truex Jr.	Joe Gibbs Racing	Toyota
20	Erik Jones	Joe Gibbs Racing	Toyota
21	Paul Menard	Wood Brothers Racing	Ford
22	Joey Logano	Team Penske	Ford
24	William Byron	Hendrick Motorsports	Chevrolet
27	Reed Sorenson	Premium Motorsports	Chevrolet
32	Corey LaJoie	Go Fas Racing	Ford
34	Michael McDowell	Front Row Motorsports	Ford
36	Matt Tifft (R)	Front Row Motorsports	Ford
37	Chris Buescher	JTG Daugherty Racing	Chevrolet
38	David Ragan	Front Row Motorsports	Ford
41	Daniel Suárez	Stewart-Haas Racing	Ford
42	Kyle Larson	Chip Ganassi Racing	Chevrolet
43	Bubba Wallace	Richard Petty Motorsports	Chevrolet
47	Ryan Preece (R)	JTG Daugherty Racing	Chevrolet
48	Jimmie Johnson	Hendrick Motorsports	Chevrolet
51	Austin Theriault	Petty Ware Racing	Ford
52	Spencer Boyd (i)	Rick Ware Racing	Chevrolet
62	Brendan Gaughan (i)	Beard Motorsports	Chevrolet
66	Joey Gase (i)	MBM Motorsports	Toyota
77	Blake Jones	Spire Motorsports	Chevrolet
88	Alex Bowman	Hendrick Motorsports	Chevrolet
95	Matt DiBenedetto	Leavine Family Racing	Toyota
96	Parker Kligerman (i)	Gaunt Brothers Racing	Toyota
Official entry list

== Practice ==
=== First practice ===
Denny Hamlin was the fastest in the first practice session with a time of 46.734 seconds and a speed of 204.904 mph (329.761 km/h).

Pos	No.	Driver	Team	Manufacturer	Time	Speed
1	11	Denny Hamlin	Joe Gibbs Racing	Toyota	46.734	204.904
2	4	Kevin Harvick	Stewart-Haas Racing	Ford	47.013	203.688
3	18	Kyle Busch	Joe Gibbs Racing	Toyota	47.014	203.684
Official first practice results

=== Final practice ===
Clint Bowyer was the fastest in the final practice session with a time of 47.396 seconds and a speed of 202.042 mph (325.155 km/h).

Pos	No.	Driver	Team	Manufacturer	Time	Speed
1	14	Clint Bowyer	Stewart-Haas Racing	Ford	47.396	202.042
2	10	Aric Almirola	Stewart-Haas Racing	Ford	47.681	200.835
3	21	Matt Crafton	Wood Brothers Racing	Ford	47.686	200.813
Official final practice results

== Qualifying ==
Chase Elliott scored the pole for the race with a time of 49.692 and a speed of 192.707 mph (310.132 km/h).

=== Qualifying results ===
Pos	No.	Driver	Team	Manufacturer	Time
1	9	Chase Elliott	Hendrick Motorsports	Chevrolet	49.692
2	88	Alex Bowman	Hendrick Motorsports	Chevrolet	49.732
3	24	William Byron	Hendrick Motorsports	Chevrolet	49.808
4	48	Jimmie Johnson	Hendrick Motorsports	Chevrolet	49.988
5	10	Aric Almirola	Stewart-Haas Racing	Ford	49.992
6	2	Brad Keselowski	Team Penske	Ford	50.007
7	17	Ricky Stenhouse Jr.	Roush Fenway Racing	Ford	50.053
8	14	Clint Bowyer	Stewart-Haas Racing	Ford	50.055
9	12	Ryan Blaney	Team Penske	Ford	50.078
10	22	Joey Logano	Team Penske	Ford	50.130
11	20	Erik Jones	Joe Gibbs Racing	Toyota	50.179
12	42	Kyle Larson	Chip Ganassi Racing	Chevrolet	50.195
13	6	Ryan Newman	Roush Fenway Racing	Ford	50.223
14	21	Paul Menard	Wood Brothers Racing	Ford	50.264
15	4	Kevin Harvick	Stewart-Haas Racing	Ford	50.315
16	36	Matt Tifft (R)	Front Row Motorsports	Ford	50.316
17	38	David Ragan	Front Row Motorsports	Ford	50.341
18	19	Martin Truex Jr.	Joe Gibbs Racing	Toyota	50.452
19	41	Daniel Suárez	Stewart-Haas Racing	Ford	50.481
20	3	Austin Dillon	Richard Childress Racing	Chevrolet	50.567
21	13	Ty Dillon	Germain Racing	Chevrolet	50.577
22	34	Michael McDowell	Front Row Motorsports	Ford	50.594
23	37	Chris Buescher	JTG Daugherty Racing	Chevrolet	50.616
24	1	Kurt Busch	Chip Ganassi Racing	Chevrolet	50.656
25	00	Landon Cassill (i)	StarCom Racing	Chevrolet	50.750
26	18	Kyle Busch	Joe Gibbs Racing	Toyota	50.776
27	43	Bubba Wallace	Richard Petty Motorsports	Chevrolet	50.863
28	62	Brendan Gaughan (i)	Beard Motorsports	Chevrolet	50.873
29	8	Daniel Hemric (R)	Richard Childress Racing	Chevrolet	50.881
30	47	Ryan Preece (R)	JTG Daugherty Racing	Chevrolet	51.011
31	95	Matt DiBenedetto	Leavine Family Racing	Toyota	51.176
32	96	Parker Kligerman (i)	Gaunt Brothers Racing	Toyota	51.956
33	32	Corey LaJoie	Go Fas Racing	Ford	52.002
34	15	Ross Chastain (i)	Premium Motorsports	Chevrolet	52.324
35	77	Blake Jones	Spire Motorsports	Chevrolet	52.407
36	66	Joey Gase (i)	MBM Motorsports	Toyota	53.101
37	51	Austin Theriault	Petty Ware Racing	Ford	53.227
38	27	Reed Sorenson	Premium Motorsports	Chevrolet	53.471
39	52	Spencer Boyd (i)	Rick Ware Racing	Chevrolet	54.404
40	11	Denny Hamlin	Joe Gibbs Racing	Toyota	0.000
Official qualifying results

== Race ==
Note: Stage 1 was held on Sunday, October 13, but the race was interrupted by rain after 57 laps. Stages 2 and 3 were completed on Monday, October 14.

=== Stage 1 ===
Starting in 6th, Brad Keselowski charged his way from the front and led the first lap taking the lead away from pole sitter Chase Elliott with a push from Clint Bowyer. On lap 5, Austin Dillon took the lead but was soon passed by Kyle Busch on the same lap. On lap 7, Dillon would take the lead. On the next lap, Kyle's brother Kurt Busch took the lead from Dillon. On lap 19, Ryan Blaney took the lead. On lap 34, green flag pitstops began and Blaney gave the lead to Erik Jones. But coming to pit road, Blaney would spin on his way to pit road while he was trying to slow down his car. No caution flew as he was out of harms way and got back rolling again. Jones would give the lead on the next lap to Aric Almirola. The top 7 who did not pit came to pit road on the next lap and Brad Keselowski led the field off of pit road before the first caution flew on lap 37 after they just exited pit road when Spencer Boyd's car stalled in turn 4. Keselowski would lead the field to the restart on lap 41. On the restart, Ryan Newman took the lead from Keselowski with a push by Joey Logano. Keselowski retook the lead on lap 44. On lap 46, Kurt Busch would take the lead. On lap 47, Chase Elliott took the lead. On lap 50, Daniel Hemric took the lead from Elliott. On lap 51, William Byron took the lead from Hemric. On lap 54, with two to go in stage 1, Joey Logano took the lead. Byron would pass Logano for the lead on the last lap of stage 1 and Byron would win stage 1. As soon as stage 1 concluded, rain began to fall. The race would be postponed to the following day, Monday, and the race would restart at 1 pm central.

=== Stage 2 ===
After stage 1 concluded, Matt Crafton took over the No. 21 car for Paul Menard after Menard was experiencing back problems. The track would be dried and the race would get back going again on lap 63 with Ryan Blaney as the leader. On lap 70, Clint Bowyer challenged Blaney for the lead but was unable to make it stick. On lap 73, Joey Logano took the lead from his teammate. On lap 78, Chase Elliott took the lead from Logano. On lap 84, Brad Keselowski took the lead from Elliott. On lap 87, Elliott retook the lead. On lap 90, the second round of green flag pitstops began and Elliott gave the lead to Keselowski. On lap 94, Keselowski and others behind him came onto pit road. Aric Almirola came out first and he would lead the next 2 laps before getting passed by Jimmie Johnson on lap 96. On lap 98, Chase Elliott took the lead. Alex Bowman tried to take the lead from Elliott but could not pass him. On lap 102, Joey Logano took the lead. On lap 104, Elliott took the lead back. On lap 107 and 4 laps to go in stage 2, the first of three big ones would occur in turn 3 taking out 11 cars and many chase contenders in the process. On that same lap, Alex Bowman took the lead. Going down the backstretch, Joey Logano had a huge run on Bowman and tried to pass Bowman. Bowman blocked but Logano hit Bowman hard in the rear which sent Bowman sideways on the apron. Bowman overcorrected and spun right up the track right in front of the pack collecting Kurt Busch, Kevin Harvick, Chase Elliott, Denny Hamlin, Martin Truex Jr., Michael McDowell, Kyle Larson, Ryan Preece, and Jimmie Johnson. Stage 2 concluded under caution and Clint Bowyer was in front when the caution came out and he won stage 2.

=== Final stage ===
Brad Keselowski won the race off of pit road and he led the field to the restart on lap 117. William Byron led lap 117 but could not fully pass Bowyer and Bowyer held on to his lead. On lap 122, the fourth caution flew when Bubba Wallace went up to avoid Landon Cassill but came up right in front of Blake Jones and both Wallace and Jones crashed into the outside wall on the backstretch. The race would restart on lap 126 with Bowyer as the leader. On the restart, Kyle Busch took the lead from Bowyer. On lap 127, Joey Logano took the lead from Busch. On lap 132, the 5th caution flew when Martin Truex Jr's left front tire exploded on the backstretch and put debris on the racetrack. Ricky Stenhouse Jr. won the race off of pit road after taking fuel only and he led the field to the restart with 51 laps to go. With 46 to go, Joey Logano tried to pass Stenhouse for the lead and led that lap but did not fully pass him. With 38 to go, Kyle Busch passed Stenhouse for the lead. With 36 to go, the 6th caution would fly when Clint Bowyer spun in turns 3 and 4. William Byron won the race off of pit road taking fuel only and he led the field to the restart with 31 laps to go. With 29 to go, Ricky Stenhouse Jr. took the lead from Byron. With 26 to go, the second big one would occur on the backstretch taking out 9 cars. William Byron got shoved from behind by Kurt Busch and Byron's car spun up and clipped Joey Logano nearly sending Logano upside down and also blowing Logano's hood up. Busch, Byron, and Logano also took out Erik Jones, Matt Crafton, Daniel Suárez, Ryan Preece, Austin Theriault, and Joey Gase. The race would restart with 19 laps to go with Stenhouse leading. With 17 to go, the 8th caution would fly when Daniel Suárez spun in turns 3 and 4. The race would restart with 13 to go. On the restart, Kurt Busch took the lead from Ricky Stenhouse Jr. With 9 to go, Stenhouse took the lead. Busch would retake the lead with 8 to go. On that lap, Busch and Stenhouse were side by side when Kurt's brother Kyle made a 3 wide pass for the lead on the outside and Kyle took the lead. With 7 to go, Kyle got in front of Kurt to form a tandem. Stenhouse had a run and he challenged Kyle for the lead down the backstretch. Meanwhile, Brendan Gaughan had a huge push from Brad Keselowski and it looked like he was going to steal the lead from Stenhouse and Busch. But as soon as Gaughan got side by side with Busch and Stenhouse, Kurt Busch turned his brother Kyle around and Kyle collected Gaughan sending Gaughan spinning in turn 3. Gaughan spun and got hit by both Matt DiBenedetto and Kurt Busch at the right angle that sent his car in the full 360 barrel roll into the air before it landed perfectly on all four wheels. The wreck would trigger the third big one and cause the 9th and final caution of the race collecting 11 cars. The cars involved were Kurt Busch, Brad Keselowski, Kevin Harvick, Daniel Hemric, Ricky Stenhouse Jr., Kyle Busch, Chris Buescher, David Ragan, Ryan Preece, Brendan Gaughan, and Matt DiBenedetto. The wreck would cause a short red flag to clean it up; Gaughan, freshly released from the infield care center, would give an interview during this red flag where he saw a replay and, on noticing Stenhouse was involved, quipped "Eh, it's Stenhouse, go figure" while also reflecting on his wreck he also quoted "mother, its okay. It's just a flip". The wreck would also set up a two lap shootout with Ryan Blaney as the new leader. On the restart, Blaney took the lead. On the final lap, Ryan Newman got a big push from Denny Hamlin down the backstretch and took the lead. Newman got a bit sideways in turn 3 but saved it and never lost momentum. Coming to the tri-oval, Newman got a big lead and Blaney caught up and tried to pass Newman. Behind them, Chris Buescher and Parker Kligerman both wrecked in the tri-oval but no caution flew. Blaney got to Newman's inside in the tri-oval and it was a drag race to the finish line. The two door banged each other all the way to the finish line and the finish ended up being too close to call on first glance. But the electronic timing and scoring showed that Ryan Blaney beat Newman to the line and Newman would be in second. Blaney beat Newman by 0.007 seconds, the 13th closest finish in the history of NASCAR. It would be Blaney's third career Cup Series win and his first and only win of 2019 as the win moved him on to the round of 8. Denny Hamlin, Aric Almirola, and Michael McDowell rounded out the top 5 while Austin Dillon, Corey LaJoie, Chase Elliott, Ricky Stenhouse Jr., and Ty Dillon rounded out the top 10.

=== Stage results ===
Stage One Laps: 55

Pos	No	Driver	Team	Manufacturer	Points
1	24	William Byron	Hendrick Motorsports	Chevrolet	10
2	22	Joey Logano	Team Penske	Ford	9
3	88	Alex Bowman	Hendrick Motorsports	Chevrolet	8
4	17	Ricky Stenhouse Jr.	Roush Fenway Racing	Ford	7
5	2	Brad Keselowski	Team Penske	Ford	6
6	42	Kyle Larson	Chip Ganassi Racing	Chevrolet	5
7	48	Jimmie Johnson	Hendrick Motorsports	Chevrolet	4
8	41	Daniel Suárez	Stewart-Haas Racing	Ford	3
9	1	Kurt Busch	Chip Ganassi Racing	Chevrolet	2
10	12	Ryan Blaney	Team Penske	Ford	1
Official stage one results

Stage Two Laps: 55

Pos	No	Driver	Team	Manufacturer	Points
1	14	Clint Bowyer	Stewart-Haas Racing	Ford	10
2	22	Joey Logano	Team Penske	Ford	9
3	2	Brad Keselowski	Team Penske	Ford	8
4	3	Austin Dillon	Richard Childress Racing	Chevrolet	7
5	41	Daniel Suárez	Stewart-Haas Racing	Ford	6
6	12	Ryan Blaney	Team Penske	Ford	5
7	37	Chris Buescher	JTG Daugherty Racing	Chevrolet	4
8	24	William Byron	Hendrick Motorsports	Chevrolet	3
9	1	Kurt Busch	Chip Ganassi Racing	Chevrolet	2
10	18	Kyle Busch	Joe Gibbs Racing	Toyota	1
Official stage two results

=== Final stage results ===
Stage Three Laps: 78

Pos	Grid	No	Driver	Team	Manufacturer	Laps	Points
1	9	12	Ryan Blaney	Team Penske	Ford	188	46
2	13	6	Ryan Newman	Roush Fenway Racing	Ford	188	35
3	40	11	Denny Hamlin	Joe Gibbs Racing	Toyota	188	34
4	5	10	Aric Almirola	Stewart-Haas Racing	Ford	188	33
5	22	34	Michael McDowell	Front Row Motorsports	Ford	188	32
6	20	3	Austin Dillon	Richard Childress Racing	Chevrolet	188	38
7	33	32	Corey LaJoie	Go Fas Racing	Ford	188	30
8	1	9	Chase Elliott	Hendrick Motorsports	Chevrolet	188	29
9	7	17	Ricky Stenhouse Jr.	Roush Fenway Racing	Ford	188	35
10	21	13	Ty Dillon	Germain Racing	Chevrolet	188	27
11	10	22	Joey Logano	Team Penske	Ford	188	44
12	34	15	Ross Chastain (i)	Premium Motorsports	Chevrolet	188	0
13	16	36	Matt Tifft (R)	Front Row Motorsports	Ford	188	24
14	25	00	Landon Cassill (i)	StarCom Racing	Chevrolet	188	0
15	32	96	Parker Kligerman (i)	Gaunt Brothers Racing	Toyota	188	0
16	14	21	Paul Menard*	Wood Brothers Racing	Ford	188	21
17	15	4	Kevin Harvick	Stewart-Haas Racing	Ford	188	20
18	30	47	Ryan Preece (R)	JTG Daugherty Racing	Chevrolet	188	19
19	26	18	Kyle Busch	Joe Gibbs Racing	Toyota	188	19
20	23	37	Chris Buescher	JTG Daugherty Racing	Chevrolet	187	21
21	29	8	Daniel Hemric (R)	Richard Childress Racing	Chevrolet	187	16
22	38	27	Reed Sorenson	Premium Motorsports	Chevrolet	187	15
23	8	14	Clint Bowyer	Stewart-Haas Racing	Ford	186	24
24	27	43	Bubba Wallace	Richard Petty Motorsports	Chevrolet	185	13
25	6	2	Brad Keselowski	Team Penske	Ford	182	26
26	18	19	Martin Truex Jr.	Joe Gibbs Racing	Toyota	182	11
27	28	62	Brendan Gaughan (i)	Beard Motorsports	Chevrolet	181	0
28	24	1	Kurt Busch	Chip Ganassi Racing	Chevrolet	181	13
29	17	38	David Ragan	Front Row Motorsports	Ford	181	8
30	31	95	Matt DiBenedetto	Leavine Family Racing	Toyota	181	7
31	35	77	Blake Jones	Spire Motorsports	Chevrolet	179	6
32	19	41	Daniel Suárez	Stewart-Haas Racing	Ford	168	14
33	3	24	William Byron	Hendrick Motorsports	Chevrolet	162	17
34	11	20	Erik Jones	Joe Gibbs Racing	Toyota	162	3
35	37	51	Austin Theriault	Petty Ware Racing	Ford	162	2
36	36	66	Joey Gase (i)	MBM Motorsports	Toyota	161	0
37	2	88	Alex Bowman	Hendrick Motorsports	Chevrolet	106	9
38	4	48	Jimmie Johnson	Hendrick Motorsports	Chevrolet	106	5
39	12	42	Kyle Larson	Chip Ganassi Racing	Chevrolet	106	6
40	39	52	Spencer Boyd (i)	Rick Ware Racing	Chevrolet	53	0
Official race results^{*} Matt Crafton replaced Paul Menard after Stage 1 of the race due to back problems.

=== Race statistics ===
- Lead changes: 47 among 19 different drivers
- Cautions/Laps: 9 for 43
- Red flags: 1
- Time of race: 3 hours, 39 minutes and 36 seconds
- Average speed: 136.644 miles per hour (219.907 km/h)

== Media ==
=== Television ===
NBC Sports covered the race on the television side. Rick Allen, Jeff Burton and six-time Talladega winner Dale Earnhardt Jr. covered the race in the booth for NBC. Steve Letarte called from the NBC Peacock Pit Box on pit road. Dave Burns, Marty Snider and Kelli Stavast reported from pit lane during the race.

NBC/NBCSN
Booth announcers	Pit reporters
Lap-by-lap: Rick Allen; Color-commentator: Jeff Burton; Color-commentator: Dale Earnhardt Jr. NBC Peacock Pitbox: Steve Letarte	Dave Burns; Marty Snider; Kelli Stavast

=== Radio ===
MRN covered the radio call for the race, which was simulcast on Sirius XM NASCAR Radio. Alex Hayden, Jeff Striegle, and Rusty Wallace called the race for MRN when the field races thru the tri-oval. Dave Moody called the action from turn 1, Mike Bagley called the action for MRN when the field races down the backstraightaway, and Dan Hubbard called the race from the Sunoco tower just outside of turn 4. Winston Kelley, Kim Coon, Steve Post, and Dillon Welch called the race for MRN from pit road.

MRN
Booth announcers	Turn announcers	Pit reporters
Lead announcer: Alex Hayden; Announcer: Jeff Striegle; Announcer: Rusty Wallace	Turns 1 & 2: Dave Moody; Backstretch: Mike Bagley; Turns 3 & 4: Dan Hubbard	Winston Kelley; Kim Coon; Steve Post; Dillon Welch

== Standings after the race ==
	Pos	Driver	Points
1	1	Denny Hamlin	3,114
1	2	Martin Truex Jr.	3,106 (–8)
	3	Kyle Busch	3,099 (–15)
	4	Kevin Harvick	3,094 (–20)
1	5	Brad Keselowski	3,078 (–36)
3	6	Joey Logano	3,076 (–38)
2	7	Kyle Larson	3,069 (–45)
1	8	Alex Bowman	3,058 (–56)
3	9	Ryan Blaney	3,056 (–58)
1	10	Chase Elliott	3,054 (–60)
1	11	Clint Bowyer	3,052 (–62)
4	12	William Byron	3,049 (–65)
	13	Aric Almirola	2,134 (–980)
	14	Ryan Newman	2,120 (–994)
	15	Kurt Busch	2,097 (–1,017)
	16	Erik Jones	2,040 (–1,074)
Official driver's standings

Manufacturers' Championship standings

Pos	Manufacturer	Points
1	Toyota	1,127
2	Ford	1,098 (–29)
3	Chevrolet	1,058 (–69)

- Note: Only the first 16 positions are included for the driver standings.

Previous race: 2019 Drydene 400	Monster Energy NASCAR Cup Series; 2019 season	Next race: 2019 Hollywood Casino 400
