= 2018 Bass Pro Shops NRA Night Race =

Race details
- Race 24 of 36 in the 2018 Monster Energy NASCAR Cup Series
- The 2018 Bass Pro Shops NRA Night Race program cover.
- Date: August 18, 2018
- Location: Bristol Motor Speedway in Bristol, Tennessee
- Course: Permanent racing facility
- Course length: .533 miles (.858 km)
- Distance: 500 laps, 266.5 mi (429 km)
- Average speed: 89.538 miles per hour (144.097 km/h)

Pole position
Driver	Kyle Larson	Chip Ganassi Racing
- Time: 15.015

Most laps led
Driver	Ryan Blaney	Team Penske
- Laps: 121

Winner
No. 41	Kurt Busch	Stewart–Haas Racing

Television in the United States
- Network: NBCSN
- Announcers: Rick Allen, Jeff Burton, Steve Letarte and Dale Earnhardt Jr.
- Nielsen ratings: 1.4 (Overnight)

Radio in the United States
- Radio: PRN
- Booth announcers: Doug Rice, Mark Garrow and Wendy Venturini
- Turn announcers: Rob Albright (Backstretch)

The 2018 Bass Pro Shops NRA Night Race is a Monster Energy NASCAR Cup Series race held on August 18, 2018, at Bristol Motor Speedway in Bristol, Tennessee. Contested over 500 laps on the .533-mile (0.858 km) short track, it was the 24th race of the 2018 Monster Energy NASCAR Cup Series season. The race was won by Kurt Busch.

== Report ==
=== Background ===
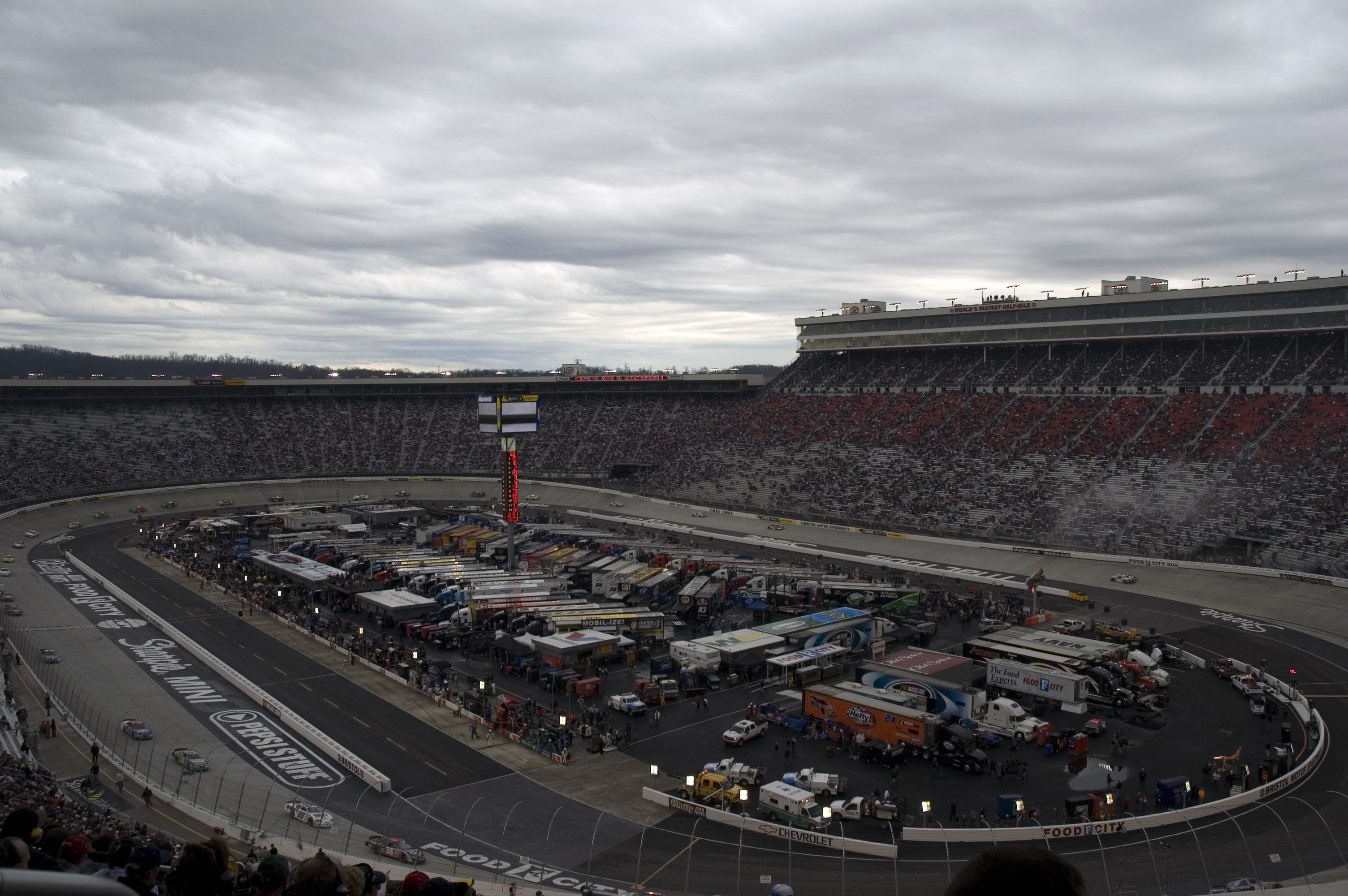
Bristol Motor Speedway, the track where the race was held.

The Bristol Motor Speedway is a NASCAR short track venue located in Bristol, Tennessee. Constructed in 1960, it held its first NASCAR race on July 30, 1961. Despite its short length, Bristol is among the most popular tracks on the NASCAR schedule because of its distinct features, which include extraordinarily steep banking, an all concrete surface, two pit roads, and stadium-like seating. It has also been named one of the loudest NASCAR tracks.

==== Entry list ====
No.	Driver	Team	Manufacturer
00	Landon Cassill	StarCom Racing	Chevrolet
1	Jamie McMurray	Chip Ganassi Racing	Chevrolet
2	Brad Keselowski	Team Penske	Ford
3	Austin Dillon	Richard Childress Racing	Chevrolet
4	Kevin Harvick	Stewart–Haas Racing	Ford
6	Trevor Bayne	Roush Fenway Racing	Ford
7	J. J. Yeley (i)	Premium Motorsports	Chevrolet
9	Chase Elliott	Hendrick Motorsports	Chevrolet
10	Aric Almirola	Stewart–Haas Racing	Ford
11	Denny Hamlin	Joe Gibbs Racing	Toyota
12	Ryan Blaney	Team Penske	Ford
13	Ty Dillon	Germain Racing	Chevrolet
14	Clint Bowyer	Stewart–Haas Racing	Ford
15	Ross Chastain (i)	Premium Motorsports	Chevrolet
17	Ricky Stenhouse Jr.	Roush Fenway Racing	Ford
18	Kyle Busch	Joe Gibbs Racing	Toyota
19	Daniel Suárez	Joe Gibbs Racing	Toyota
20	Erik Jones	Joe Gibbs Racing	Toyota
21	Paul Menard	Wood Brothers Racing	Ford
22	Joey Logano	Team Penske	Ford
23	Blake Jones	BK Racing	Toyota
24	William Byron (R)	Hendrick Motorsports	Chevrolet
31	Ryan Newman	Richard Childress Racing	Chevrolet
32	Matt DiBenedetto	Go Fas Racing	Ford
34	Michael McDowell	Front Row Motorsports	Ford
37	Chris Buescher	JTG Daugherty Racing	Chevrolet
38	David Ragan	Front Row Motorsports	Ford
41	Kurt Busch	Stewart–Haas Racing	Ford
42	Kyle Larson	Chip Ganassi Racing	Chevrolet
43	Bubba Wallace (R)	Richard Petty Motorsports	Chevrolet
47	A. J. Allmendinger	JTG Daugherty Racing	Chevrolet
48	Jimmie Johnson	Hendrick Motorsports	Chevrolet
51	Reed Sorenson	Rick Ware Racing	Chevrolet
52	B. J. McLeod (i)	Rick Ware Racing	Ford
66	Timmy Hill (i)	MBM Motorsports	Toyota
72	Corey LaJoie	TriStar Motorsports	Chevrolet
78	Martin Truex Jr.	Furniture Row Racing	Toyota
88	Alex Bowman	Hendrick Motorsports	Chevrolet
95	Kasey Kahne	Leavine Family Racing	Chevrolet
96	Jesse Little (i)	Gaunt Brothers Racing	Toyota
99	Gray Gaulding	StarCom Racing	Chevrolet
Official entry list

== Practice ==
=== First practice ===
Chase Elliott was the fastest in the first practice session with a time of 15.151 seconds and a speed of 126.645 mph (203.815 km/h).

Pos	No.	Driver	Team	Manufacturer	Time	Speed
1	9	Chase Elliott	Hendrick Motorsports	Chevrolet	15.151	126.645
2	42	Kyle Larson	Chip Ganassi Racing	Chevrolet	15.191	126.312
3	88	Alex Bowman	Hendrick Motorsports	Chevrolet	15.193	126.295
Official first practice results

=== Final practice ===
Kyle Busch was the fastest in the final practice session with a time of 15.141 seconds and a speed of 126.729 mph (203.951 km/h).

Pos	No.	Driver	Team	Manufacturer	Time	Speed
1	18	Kyle Busch	Joe Gibbs Racing	Toyota	15.141	126.729
2	78	Martin Truex Jr.	Furniture Row Racing	Toyota	15.191	126.312
3	10	Aric Almirola	Stewart–Haas Racing	Ford	15.194	126.287
Official final practice results

== Qualifying ==
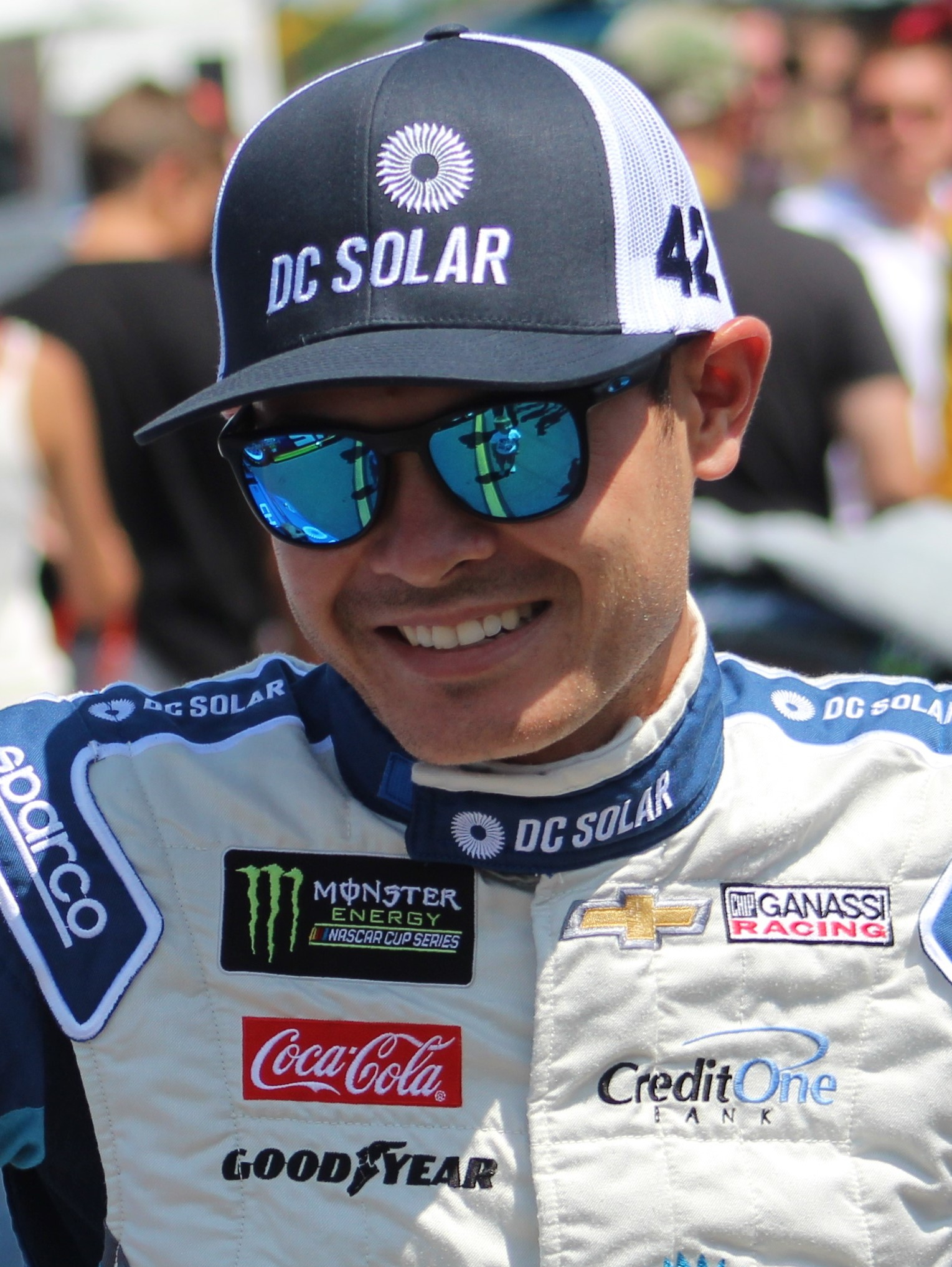
Kyle Larson scored the pole position.

Kyle Larson scored the pole for the race with a time of 15.015 and a speed of 127.792 mph (205.661 km/h).

=== Qualifying results ===
Pos	No.	Driver	Team	Manufacturer	R1	R2	R3
1	42	Kyle Larson	Chip Ganassi Racing	Chevrolet	14.997	15.034	15.015
2	9	Chase Elliott	Hendrick Motorsports	Chevrolet	15.097	15.135	15.030
3	18	Kyle Busch	Joe Gibbs Racing	Toyota	15.259	15.112	15.033
4	21	Paul Menard	Wood Brothers Racing	Ford	15.281	15.094	15.037
5	24	William Byron (R)	Hendrick Motorsports	Chevrolet	15.252	15.225	15.043
6	4	Kevin Harvick	Stewart–Haas Racing	Ford	15.261	15.146	15.104
7	11	Denny Hamlin	Joe Gibbs Racing	Toyota	15.233	15.131	15.121
8	10	Aric Almirola	Stewart–Haas Racing	Ford	15.239	15.226	15.123
9	41	Kurt Busch	Stewart–Haas Racing	Ford	15.241	15.138	15.125
10	12	Ryan Blaney	Team Penske	Ford	15.114	15.154	15.137
11	2	Brad Keselowski	Team Penske	Ford	15.290	15.125	15.198
12	17	Ricky Stenhouse Jr.	Roush Fenway Racing	Ford	15.126	15.237	15.230
13	48	Jimmie Johnson	Hendrick Motorsports	Chevrolet	15.138	15.238	—
14	20	Erik Jones	Joe Gibbs Racing	Toyota	15.170	15.246	—
15	38	David Ragan	Front Row Motorsports	Ford	15.278	15.266	—
16	14	Clint Bowyer	Stewart–Haas Racing	Ford	15.272	15.268	—
17	78	Martin Truex Jr.	Furniture Row Racing	Toyota	15.279	15.271	—
18	3	Austin Dillon	Richard Childress Racing	Chevrolet	15.308	15.278	—
19	22	Joey Logano	Team Penske	Ford	15.264	15.294	—
20	1	Jamie McMurray	Chip Ganassi Racing	Chevrolet	15.205	15.301	—
21	19	Daniel Suárez	Joe Gibbs Racing	Toyota	15.130	15.306	—
22	88	Alex Bowman	Hendrick Motorsports	Chevrolet	15.262	15.336	—
23	6	Trevor Bayne	Roush Fenway Racing	Ford	15.238	15.342	—
24	31	Ryan Newman	Richard Childress Racing	Chevrolet	15.294	15.431	—
25	47	A. J. Allmendinger	JTG Daugherty Racing	Chevrolet	15.363	—	—
26	95	Kasey Kahne	Leavine Family Racing	Chevrolet	15.426	—	—
27	43	Bubba Wallace (R)	Richard Petty Motorsports	Chevrolet	15.435	—	—
28	37	Chris Buescher	JTG Daugherty Racing	Chevrolet	15.448	—	—
29	32	Matt DiBenedetto	Go Fas Racing	Ford	15.466	—	—
30	72	Corey LaJoie	TriStar Motorsports	Chevrolet	15.482	—	—
31	34	Michael McDowell	Front Row Motorsports	Ford	15.514	—	—
32	13	Ty Dillon	Germain Racing	Chevrolet	15.567	—	—
33	96	Jesse Little (i)	Gaunt Brothers Racing	Toyota	15.688	—	—
34	7	J. J. Yeley (i)	Premium Motorsports	Chevrolet	15.754	—	—
35	15	Ross Chastain (i)	Premium Motorsports	Chevrolet	15.758	—	—
36	51	Reed Sorenson	Rick Ware Racing	Chevrolet	15.822	—	—
37	66	Timmy Hill (i)	MBM Motorsports	Toyota	15.882	—	—
38	99	Gray Gaulding	StarCom Racing	Chevrolet	15.899	—	—
39	00	Landon Cassill	StarCom Racing	Chevrolet	15.936	—	—
40	23	Blake Jones	BK Racing	Toyota	16.101	—	—
Did not qualify
41	52	B. J. McLeod (i)	Rick Ware Racing	Ford	15.909	—	—
Official qualifying results

== Race ==
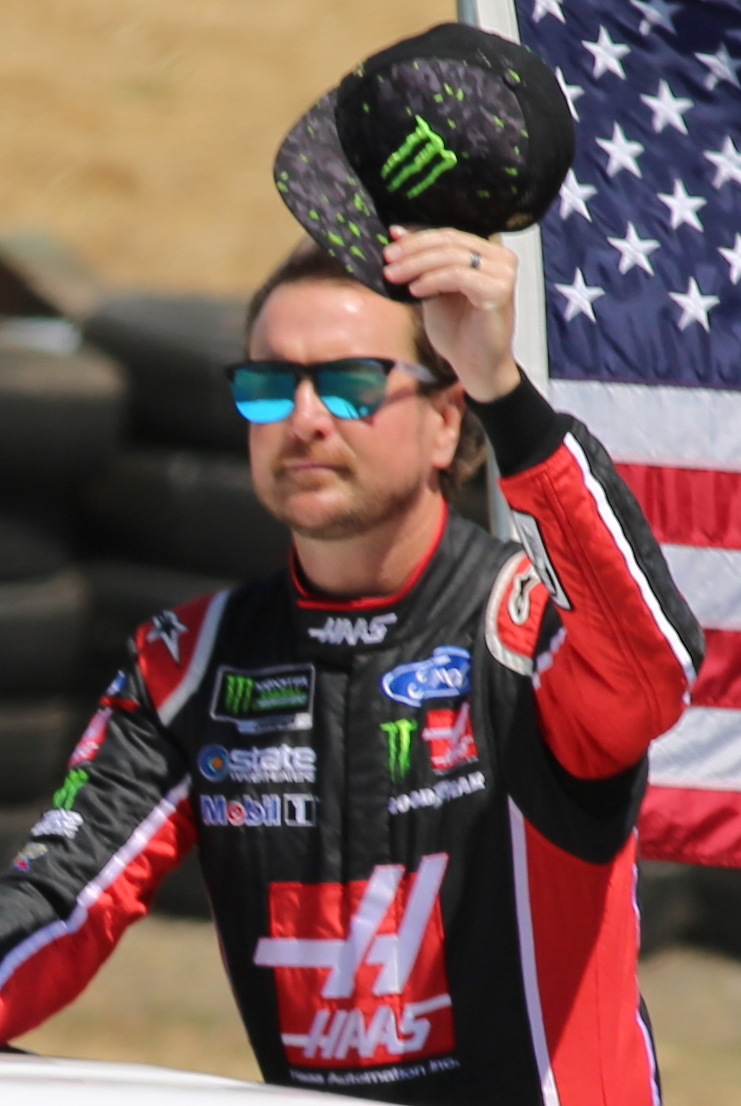
Kurt Busch won the race.

=== Stage Results ===
Stage 1 Laps: 125

Pos	No	Driver	Team	Manufacturer	Points
1	12	Ryan Blaney	Team Penske	Ford	10
2	4	Kevin Harvick	Stewart–Haas Racing	Ford	9
3	14	Clint Bowyer	Stewart–Haas Racing	Ford	8
4	9	Chase Elliott	Hendrick Motorsports	Chevrolet	7
5	10	Aric Almirola	Stewart–Haas Racing	Ford	6
6	42	Kyle Larson	Chip Ganassi Racing	Chevrolet	5
7	41	Kurt Busch	Stewart–Haas Racing	Ford	4
8	20	Erik Jones	Joe Gibbs Racing	Toyota	3
9	22	Joey Logano	Team Penske	Ford	2
10	48	Jimmie Johnson	Hendrick Motorsports	Chevrolet	1
Official stage one results

Stage 2 Laps: 125

Pos	No	Driver	Team	Manufacturer	Points
1	22	Joey Logano	Team Penske	Ford	10
2	9	Chase Elliott	Hendrick Motorsports	Chevrolet	9
3	42	Kyle Larson	Chip Ganassi Racing	Chevrolet	8
4	10	Aric Almirola	Stewart–Haas Racing	Ford	7
5	12	Ryan Blaney	Team Penske	Ford	6
6	14	Clint Bowyer	Stewart–Haas Racing	Ford	5
7	20	Erik Jones	Joe Gibbs Racing	Toyota	4
8	48	Jimmie Johnson	Hendrick Motorsports	Chevrolet	3
9	41	Kurt Busch	Stewart–Haas Racing	Ford	2
10	88	Alex Bowman	Hendrick Motorsports	Chevrolet	1
Official stage two results

=== Final Stage Results ===
Stage 3 Laps: 250

Pos	Grid	No	Driver	Team	Manufacturer	Laps	Points
1	9	41	Kurt Busch	Stewart–Haas Racing	Ford	500	46
2	1	42	Kyle Larson	Chip Ganassi Racing	Chevrolet	500	48
3	2	9	Chase Elliott	Hendrick Motorsports	Chevrolet	500	50
4	19	22	Joey Logano	Team Penske	Ford	500	45
5	14	20	Erik Jones	Joe Gibbs Racing	Toyota	500	39
6	16	14	Clint Bowyer	Stewart–Haas Racing	Ford	500	44
7	10	12	Ryan Blaney	Team Penske	Ford	500	46
8	22	88	Alex Bowman	Hendrick Motorsports	Chevrolet	500	30
9	13	48	Jimmie Johnson	Hendrick Motorsports	Chevrolet	500	32
10	6	4	Kevin Harvick	Stewart–Haas Racing	Ford	500	36
11	23	6	Trevor Bayne	Roush Fenway Racing	Ford	500	26
12	24	31	Ryan Newman	Richard Childress Racing	Chevrolet	500	25
13	18	3	Austin Dillon	Richard Childress Racing	Chevrolet	500	24
14	7	11	Denny Hamlin	Joe Gibbs Racing	Toyota	500	23
15	26	95	Kasey Kahne	Leavine Family Racing	Chevrolet	500	22
16	11	2	Brad Keselowski	Team Penske	Ford	499	21
17	15	38	David Ragan	Front Row Motorsports	Ford	499	20
18	21	19	Daniel Suárez	Joe Gibbs Racing	Toyota	499	19
19	28	37	Chris Buescher	JTG Daugherty Racing	Chevrolet	499	18
20	3	18	Kyle Busch	Joe Gibbs Racing	Toyota	497	17
21	32	13	Ty Dillon	Germain Racing	Chevrolet	496	16
22	29	32	Matt DiBenedetto	Go Fas Racing	Ford	496	15
23	5	24	William Byron (R)	Hendrick Motorsports	Chevrolet	496	14
24	12	17	Ricky Stenhouse Jr.	Roush Fenway Racing	Ford	495	13
25	39	00	Landon Cassill	StarCom Racing	Chevrolet	493	12
26	35	15	Ross Chastain (i)	Premium Motorsports	Chevrolet	492	0
27	40	23	Blake Jones	BK Racing	Toyota	485	10
28	37	66	Timmy Hill (i)	MBM Motorsports	Toyota	481	0
29	20	1	Jamie McMurray	Chip Ganassi Racing	Chevrolet	435	8
30	17	78	Martin Truex Jr.	Furniture Row Racing	Toyota	431	7
31	8	10	Aric Almirola	Stewart–Haas Racing	Ford	428	19
32	34	7	J. J. Yeley (i)	Premium Motorsports	Chevrolet	423	0
33	36	51	Reed Sorenson	Rick Ware Racing	Chevrolet	338	4
34	30	72	Corey LaJoie	TriStar Motorsports	Chevrolet	234	3
35	33	96	Jesse Little (i)	Gaunt Brothers Racing	Toyota	59	0
36	4	21	Paul Menard	Wood Brothers Racing	Ford	28	1
37	31	34	Michael McDowell	Front Row Motorsports	Ford	10	1
38	27	43	Bubba Wallace (R)	Richard Petty Motorsports	Chevrolet	3	1
39	25	47	A. J. Allmendinger	JTG Daugherty Racing	Chevrolet	1	1
40	38	99	Gray Gaulding	StarCom Racing	Chevrolet	1	1
Official race results

=== Race statistics ===
- Lead changes: 9 among different drivers
- Cautions/Laps: 9 for 70
- Red flags: 0
- Time of race: 2 hours, 58 minutes and 35 seconds
- Average speed: 89.538 miles per hour (144.097 km/h)

== Media ==
=== Television ===
NBC Sports covered the race on the television side. Rick Allen, 2008 Bristol winner Jeff Burton, Steve Letarte and 2004 Bristol winner Dale Earnhardt Jr. had the call in the booth for the race. Dave Burns, Parker Kligerman, Marty Snider and Kelli Stavast reported from pit lane during the race.

NBCSN
Booth announcers	Pit reporters
Lap-by-lap: Rick Allen; Color-commentator: Jeff Burton; Color-commentator: Steve Letarte; Color-commentator: Dale Earnhardt Jr.	Dave Burns; Parker Kligerman; Marty Snider; Kelli Stavast

=== Radio ===
The Performance Racing Network had the radio call for the race, which was simulcast on Sirius XM NASCAR Radio.

PRN
Booth announcers	Turn announcers	Pit reporters
Lead announcer: Doug Rice; Announcer: Mark Garrow; Announcer: Wendy Venturini	Backstretch: Rob Albright	Brad Gillie; Brett McMillan; Jim Noble; Steve Richards

== Standings after the race ==
Drivers' Championship standings

	Pos	Driver	Points
	1	Kyle Busch	1,003
	2	Kevin Harvick	960 (–43)
	3	Martin Truex Jr.	849 (–154)
	4	Kurt Busch	796 (–207)
	5	Clint Bowyer	776 (–227)
	6	Joey Logano	768 (–235)
1	7	Ryan Blaney	733 (–270)
1	8	Brad Keselowski	730 (–273)
1	9	Kyle Larson	729 (–274)
1	10	Denny Hamlin	707 (–296)
	11	Chase Elliott	697 (–306)
	12	Aric Almirola	658 (–345)
	13	Erik Jones	635 (–368)
	14	Jimmie Johnson	604 (–399)
	15	Alex Bowman	572 (–431)
	16	Ricky Stenhouse Jr.	493 (–510)
Official driver's standings

Manufacturers' Championship standings

Pos	Manufacturer	Points
1	Toyota	876
2	Ford	855 (–21)
3	Chevrolet	783 (–93)
Official manufacturers' standings

- Note: Only the first 16 positions are included for the driver standings.
- . – Driver has clinched a position in the Monster Energy NASCAR Cup Series playoffs.

Previous race: 2018 Consumers Energy 400	Monster Energy NASCAR Cup Series; 2018 season	Next race: 2018 Bojangles' Southern 500
