= 2018 Gander Outdoors 400 (Pocono) =

Race details
- Race 21 of 36 in the 2018 Monster Energy NASCAR Cup Series
- 2018 Gander Outdoors 400 program cover
- Date: July 29, 2018
- Location: Pocono Raceway in Long Pond, Pennsylvania
- Course: Permanent racing facility
- Course length: 2.5 miles (4.023 km)
- Distance: 164 laps, 410 mi (659.831 km)
- Scheduled distance: 160 laps, 400 mi (643.738 km)
- Average speed: 132.460 miles per hour (213.174 km/h)

Pole position
Driver	Daniel Suárez	Joe Gibbs Racing
- Time: 50.851

Most laps led
Driver	Kyle Busch	Joe Gibbs Racing
- Laps: 52

Winner
No. 18	Kyle Busch	Joe Gibbs Racing

Television in the United States
- Network: NBCSN
- Announcers: Rick Allen, Jeff Burton, Steve Letarte and Dale Earnhardt Jr.
- Nielsen ratings: 1.7/1.8 (Overnight)

Radio in the United States
- Radio: MRN
- Booth announcers: Joe Moore, Jeff Striegle and Rusty Wallace
- Turn announcers: Dave Moody (1), Mike Bagley (2) and Kyle Rickey (3)

The 2018 Gander Outdoors 400 was a Monster Energy NASCAR Cup Series race held on July 29, 2018, at Pocono Raceway in Long Pond, Pennsylvania. Contested over 164 laps – extended from 160 laps due to an overtime finish – on the 2.5-mile (4.0-kilometer) superspeedway, it was the 21st race of the 2018 Monster Energy NASCAR Cup Series season.

Leading a race-high 52 laps, Joe Gibbs Racing driver Kyle Busch took his 6th victory of the season, leading home teammate and polesitter Daniel Suárez in a 1–2 finish.

== Entry list ==
No.	Driver	Team	Manufacturer
00	Landon Cassill	StarCom Racing	Chevrolet
1	Jamie McMurray	Chip Ganassi Racing	Chevrolet
2	Brad Keselowski	Team Penske	Ford
3	Austin Dillon	Richard Childress Racing	Chevrolet
4	Kevin Harvick	Stewart–Haas Racing	Ford
6	Matt Kenseth	Roush Fenway Racing	Ford
7	Reed Sorenson	Premium Motorsports	Chevrolet
9	Chase Elliott	Hendrick Motorsports	Chevrolet
10	Aric Almirola	Stewart–Haas Racing	Ford
11	Denny Hamlin	Joe Gibbs Racing	Toyota
12	Ryan Blaney	Team Penske	Ford
13	Ty Dillon	Germain Racing	Chevrolet
14	Clint Bowyer	Stewart–Haas Racing	Ford
15	Ross Chastain (i)	Premium Motorsports	Chevrolet
17	Ricky Stenhouse Jr.	Roush Fenway Racing	Ford
18	Kyle Busch	Joe Gibbs Racing	Toyota
19	Daniel Suárez	Joe Gibbs Racing	Toyota
20	Erik Jones	Joe Gibbs Racing	Toyota
21	Paul Menard	Wood Brothers Racing	Ford
22	Joey Logano	Team Penske	Ford
23	J. J. Yeley (i)	BK Racing	Toyota
24	William Byron (R)	Hendrick Motorsports	Chevrolet
31	Ryan Newman	Richard Childress Racing	Chevrolet
32	Matt DiBenedetto	Go Fas Racing	Ford
34	Michael McDowell	Front Row Motorsports	Ford
37	Chris Buescher	JTG Daugherty Racing	Chevrolet
38	David Ragan	Front Row Motorsports	Ford
41	Kurt Busch	Stewart–Haas Racing	Ford
42	Kyle Larson	Chip Ganassi Racing	Chevrolet
43	Bubba Wallace (R)	Richard Petty Motorsports	Chevrolet
47	A. J. Allmendinger	JTG Daugherty Racing	Chevrolet
48	Jimmie Johnson	Hendrick Motorsports	Chevrolet
51	B. J. McLeod (i)	Rick Ware Racing	Chevrolet
66	Timmy Hill (i)	MBM Motorsports	Toyota
72	Corey LaJoie	TriStar Motorsports	Chevrolet
78	Martin Truex Jr.	Furniture Row Racing	Toyota
88	Alex Bowman	Hendrick Motorsports	Chevrolet
95	Kasey Kahne	Leavine Family Racing	Chevrolet
96	Jeffrey Earnhardt	Gaunt Brothers Racing	Toyota
99	Kyle Weatherman	StarCom Racing	Chevrolet
Official entry list

== Practice ==
=== First practice ===
Kevin Harvick was the fastest in the first practice session with a time of 51.439 seconds and a speed of 174.965 mph (281.579 km/h).

Pos	No.	Driver	Team	Manufacturer	Time	Speed
1	4	Kevin Harvick	Stewart–Haas Racing	Ford	51.439	174.965
2	20	Erik Jones	Joe Gibbs Racing	Toyota	51.449	174.931
3	12	Ryan Blaney	Team Penske	Ford	51.605	174.402
Official first practice results

=== Final practice ===
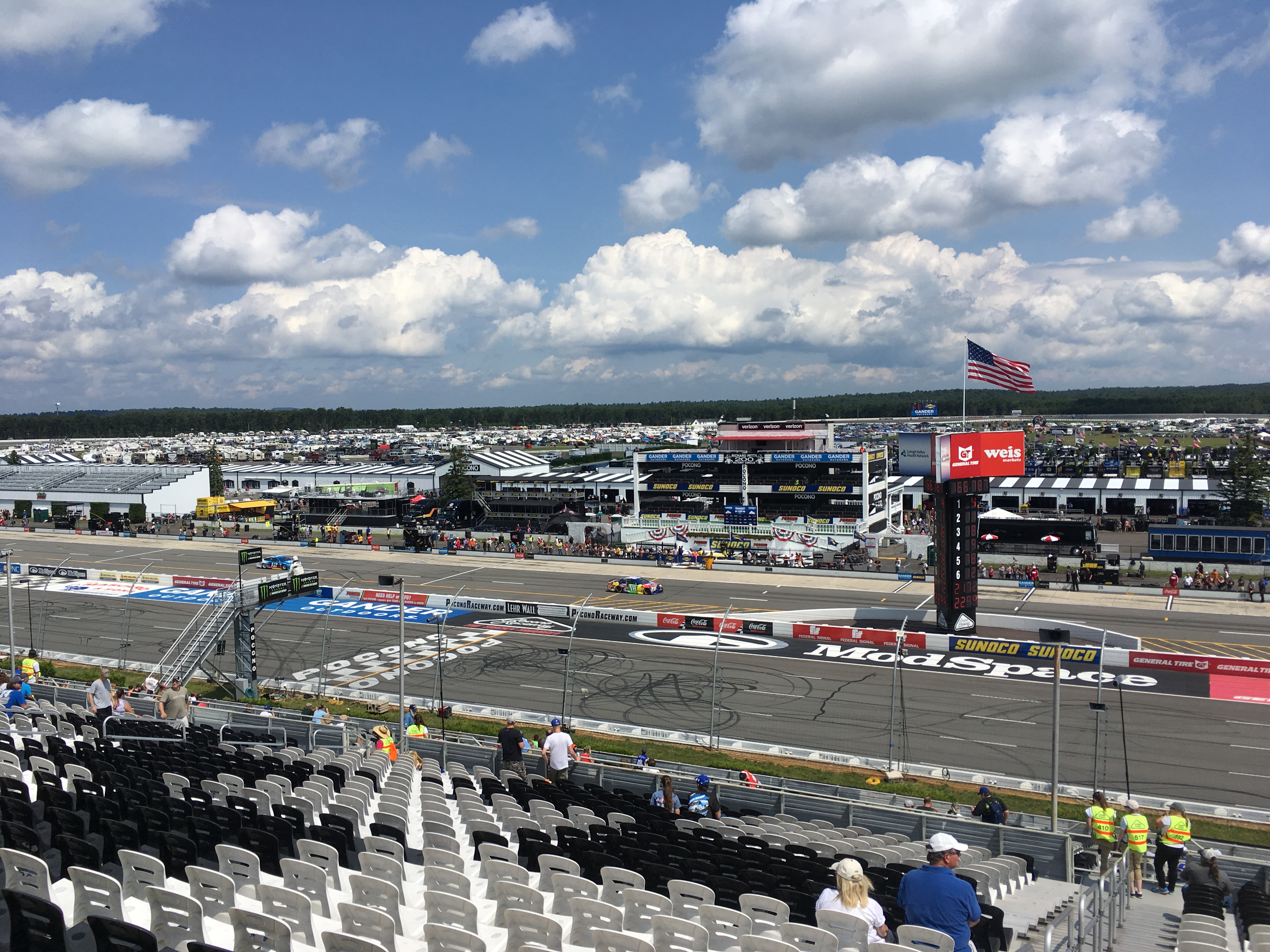
Final practice

Joey Logano was the fastest in the final practice session with a time of 51.029 seconds and a speed of 176.370 mph (283.840 km/h).

Pos	No.	Driver	Team	Manufacturer	Time	Speed
1	22	Joey Logano	Team Penske	Ford	51.029	176.370
2	4	Kevin Harvick	Stewart–Haas Racing	Ford	51.039	176.336
3	78	Martin Truex Jr.	Furniture Row Racing	Toyota	51.310	175.404
Official final practice results

== Qualifying ==
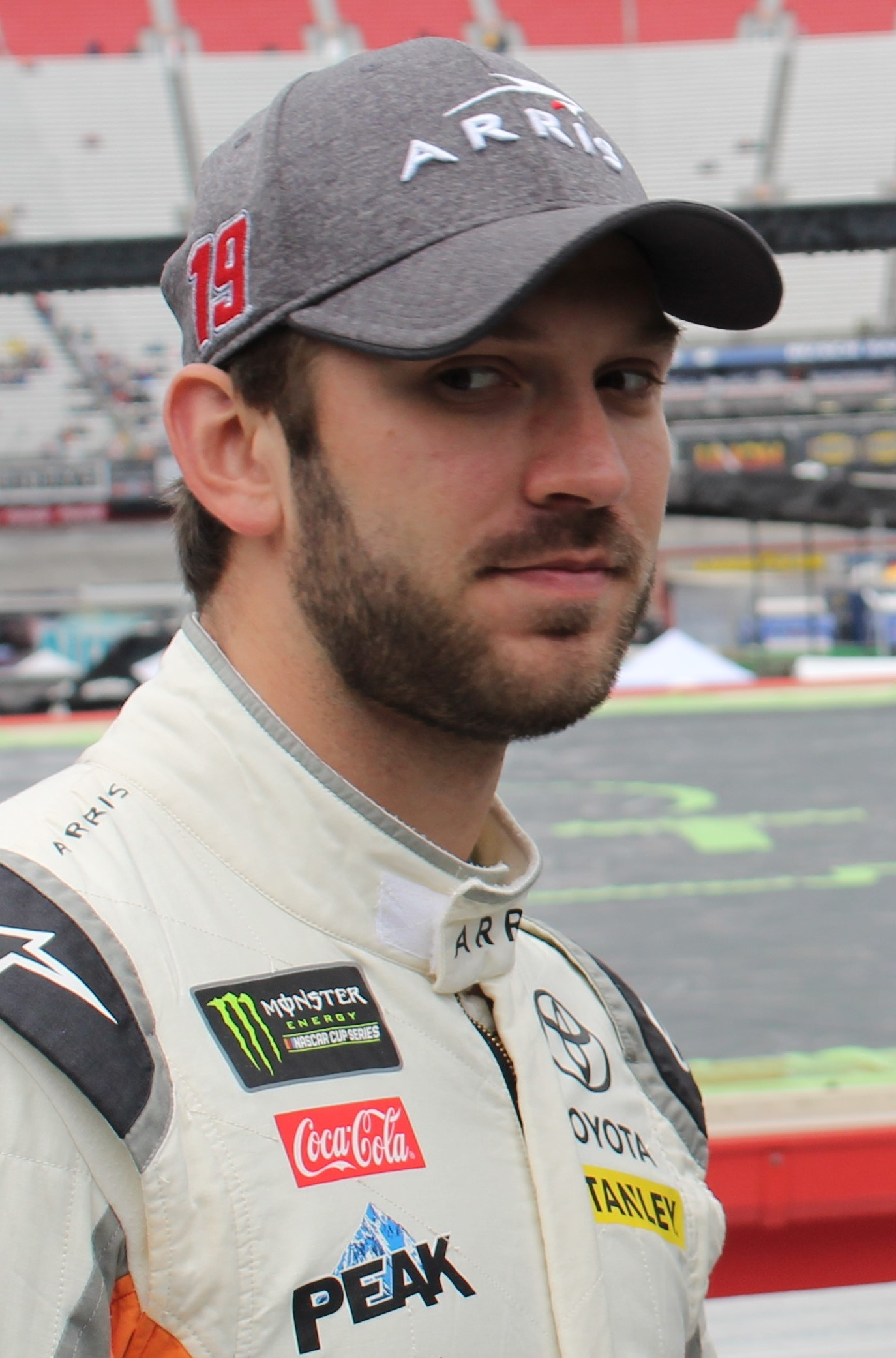
Daniel Suárez scored the pole position.

Daniel Suárez scored the pole for the race with a time of 50.851 and a speed of 176.988 mph (284.835 km/h) after Kevin Harvick and Kyle Busch were both disqualified after failing post-qualifying inspection.

=== Qualifying results ===
Pos	No.	Driver	Team	Manufacturer	R1	R2	R3
1	4	Kevin Harvick (Note: Harvick failed post-qualifying inspection, losing his pole position and was moved to the back of the field.)	Stewart–Haas Racing	Ford	51.087	50.986	50.633
2	18	Kyle Busch (Note: Driver failed post-qualifying inspection, and was moved to the back of the field.)	Joe Gibbs Racing	Toyota	51.688	51.316	50.723
3	19	Daniel Suárez	Joe Gibbs Racing	Toyota	51.477	51.219	50.851
4	42	Kyle Larson	Chip Ganassi Racing	Chevrolet	51.498	51.207	50.853
5	22	Joey Logano	Team Penske	Ford	51.507	51.234	50.969
6	24	William Byron (R)	Hendrick Motorsports	Chevrolet	51.538	50.971	50.993
7	11	Denny Hamlin	Joe Gibbs Racing	Toyota	51.624	51.312	51.012
8	20	Erik Jones	Joe Gibbs Racing	Toyota	51.267	50.942	51.023
9	2	Brad Keselowski	Team Penske	Ford	51.307	51.217	51.050
10	1	Jamie McMurray	Chip Ganassi Racing	Chevrolet	51.579	51.224	51.103
11	9	Chase Elliott	Hendrick Motorsports	Chevrolet	51.528	51.271	51.112
12	3	Austin Dillon	Richard Childress Racing	Chevrolet	51.777	51.263	51.184
13	41	Kurt Busch	Stewart–Haas Racing	Ford	51.193	51.322	—
14	78	Martin Truex Jr.	Furniture Row Racing	Toyota	51.381	51.356	—
15	48	Jimmie Johnson	Hendrick Motorsports	Chevrolet	51.648	51.398	—
16	31	Ryan Newman	Richard Childress Racing	Chevrolet	51.446	51.498	—
17	21	Paul Menard	Wood Brothers Racing	Ford	51.511	51.504	—
18	12	Ryan Blaney	Team Penske	Ford	51.946	51.530	—
19	10	Aric Almirola	Stewart–Haas Racing	Ford	51.641	51.534	—
20	88	Alex Bowman	Hendrick Motorsports	Chevrolet	51.787	51.540	—
21	14	Clint Bowyer	Stewart–Haas Racing	Ford	51.544	51.553	—
22	43	Bubba Wallace (R)	Richard Petty Motorsports	Chevrolet	51.922	51.595	—
23	6	Matt Kenseth	Roush Fenway Racing	Ford	51.983	51.654	—
24	95	Kasey Kahne	Leavine Family Racing	Chevrolet	51.834	52.168	—
25	37	Chris Buescher	JTG Daugherty Racing	Chevrolet	51.990	—	—
26	34	Michael McDowell	Front Row Motorsports	Ford	52.023	—	—
27	47	A. J. Allmendinger	JTG Daugherty Racing	Chevrolet	52.118	—	—
28	13	Ty Dillon	Germain Racing	Chevrolet	52.174	—	—
29	38	David Ragan	Front Row Motorsports	Ford	52.241	—	—
30	17	Ricky Stenhouse Jr.	Roush Fenway Racing	Ford	52.319	—	—
31	32	Matt DiBenedetto	Go Fas Racing	Ford	52.517	—	—
32	96	Jeffrey Earnhardt	Gaunt Brothers Racing	Toyota	53.313	—	—
33	23	J. J. Yeley (i)	BK Racing	Toyota	53.323	—	—
34	72	Corey LaJoie	TriStar Motorsports	Chevrolet	53.346	—	—
35	15	Gray Gaulding (Note: Qualified for Ross Chastain, who was competing at Iowa Speedway in the U.S. Cellular 250, held as part of the NASCAR Xfinity Series. Chastain started at the rear of the field.)	Premium Motorsports	Chevrolet	53.557	—	—
36	99	Kyle Weatherman	StarCom Racing	Chevrolet	53.767	—	—
37	00	Landon Cassill	StarCom Racing	Chevrolet	53.976	—	—
38	7	Reed Sorenson	Premium Motorsports	Chevrolet	54.276	—	—
39	51	B. J. McLeod (i)	Rick Ware Racing	Chevrolet	54.286	—	—
40	66	Timmy Hill (i)	MBM Motorsports	Toyota	54.652	—	—
Official qualifying results

== Race ==
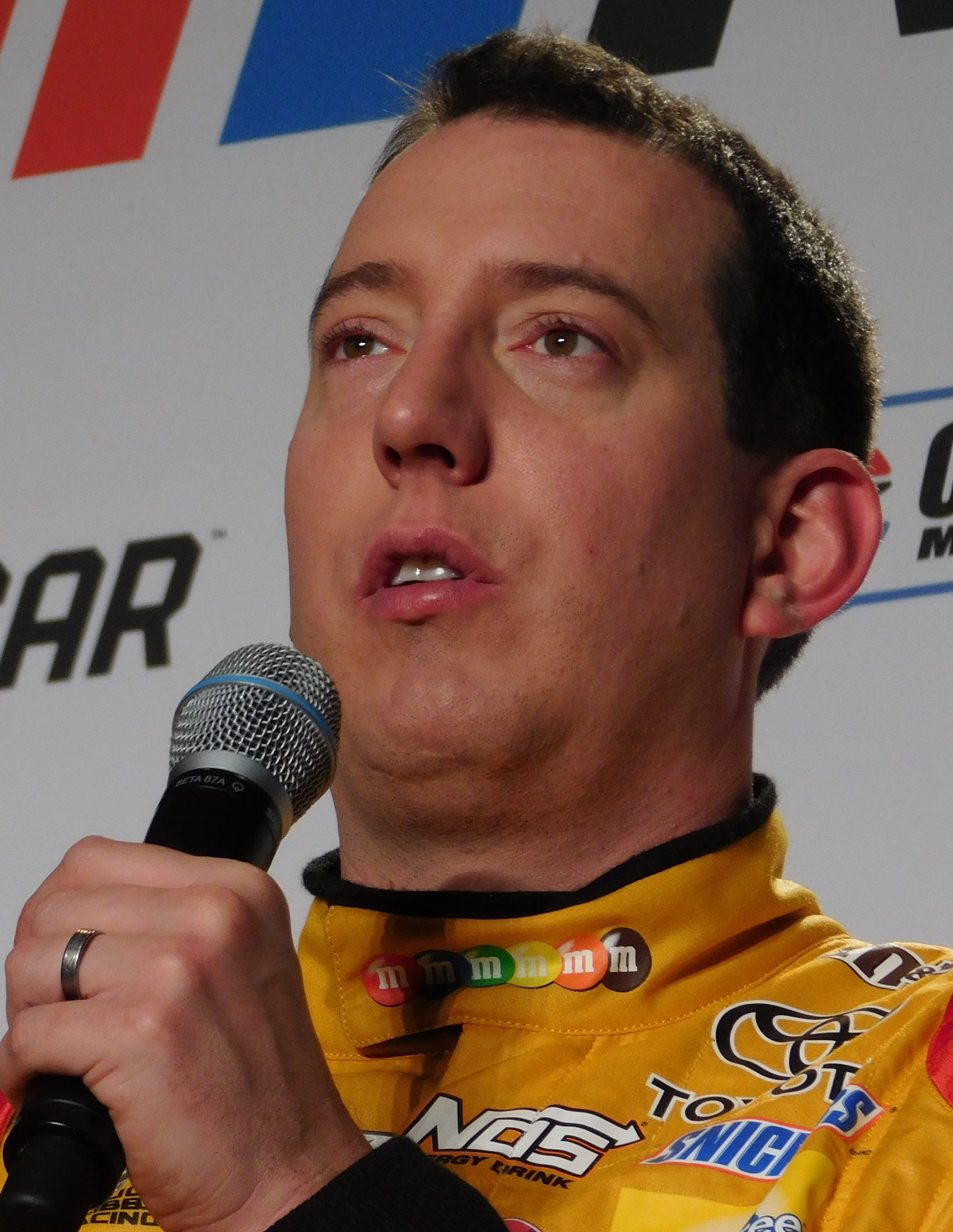
Kyle Busch won the race.

=== Stage results ===
Stage 1 Laps: 50

Pos	No	Driver	Team	Manufacturer	Points
1	9	Chase Elliott	Hendrick Motorsports	Chevrolet	10
2	4	Kevin Harvick	Stewart–Haas Racing	Ford	9
3	11	Denny Hamlin	Joe Gibbs Racing	Toyota	8
4	18	Kyle Busch	Joe Gibbs Racing	Toyota	7
5	19	Daniel Suárez	Joe Gibbs Racing	Toyota	6
6	14	Clint Bowyer	Stewart–Haas Racing	Ford	5
7	2	Brad Keselowski	Team Penske	Ford	4
8	41	Kurt Busch	Stewart–Haas Racing	Ford	3
9	88	Alex Bowman	Hendrick Motorsports	Chevrolet	2
10	12	Ryan Blaney	Team Penske	Ford	1

Stage 2 Laps: 50

Pos	No	Driver	Team	Manufacturer	Points
1	4	Kevin Harvick	Stewart–Haas Racing	Ford	10
2	9	Chase Elliott	Hendrick Motorsports	Chevrolet	9
3	14	Clint Bowyer	Stewart–Haas Racing	Ford	8
4	88	Alex Bowman	Hendrick Motorsports	Chevrolet	7
5	42	Kyle Larson	Chip Ganassi Racing	Chevrolet	6
6	48	Jimmie Johnson	Hendrick Motorsports	Chevrolet	5
7	2	Brad Keselowski	Team Penske	Ford	4
8	1	Jamie McMurray	Chip Ganassi Racing	Chevrolet	3
9	12	Ryan Blaney	Team Penske	Ford	2
10	24	William Byron (R)	Hendrick Motorsports	Chevrolet	1

=== Final stage results ===
Stage 3 Laps: 60

Pos	Grid	No	Driver	Team	Manufacturer	Laps	Points
1	2	18	Kyle Busch	Joe Gibbs Racing	Toyota	164	47
2	3	19	Daniel Suárez	Joe Gibbs Racing	Toyota	164	41
3	20	88	Alex Bowman	Hendrick Motorsports	Chevrolet	164	43
4	1	4	Kevin Harvick	Stewart–Haas Racing	Ford	164	52
5	8	20	Erik Jones	Joe Gibbs Racing	Toyota	164	32
6	6	24	William Byron (R)	Hendrick Motorsports	Chevrolet	164	32
7	11	9	Chase Elliott	Hendrick Motorsports	Chevrolet	164	49
8	16	31	Ryan Newman	Richard Childress Racing	Chevrolet	164	29
9	13	41	Kurt Busch	Stewart–Haas Racing	Ford	164	31
10	7	11	Denny Hamlin	Joe Gibbs Racing	Toyota	164	35
11	21	14	Clint Bowyer	Stewart–Haas Racing	Ford	164	39
12	18	12	Ryan Blaney	Team Penske	Ford	164	28
13	12	3	Austin Dillon	Richard Childress Racing	Chevrolet	164	24
14	27	47	A. J. Allmendinger	JTG Daugherty Racing	Chevrolet	164	23
15	14	78	Martin Truex Jr.	Furniture Row Racing	Toyota	164	22
16	26	34	Michael McDowell	Front Row Motorsports	Ford	164	21
17	15	48	Jimmie Johnson	Hendrick Motorsports	Chevrolet	164	25
18	23	6	Matt Kenseth	Roush Fenway Racing	Ford	164	19
19	29	38	David Ragan	Front Row Motorsports	Ford	164	18
20	10	1	Jamie McMurray	Chip Ganassi Racing	Chevrolet	164	25
21	17	21	Paul Menard	Wood Brothers Racing	Ford	164	16
22	30	17	Ricky Stenhouse Jr.	Roush Fenway Racing	Ford	164	15
23	4	42	Kyle Larson	Chip Ganassi Racing	Chevrolet	164	20
24	28	13	Ty Dillon	Germain Racing	Chevrolet	164	13
25	19	10	Aric Almirola	Stewart–Haas Racing	Ford	164	12
26	5	22	Joey Logano	Team Penske	Ford	164	11
27	31	32	Matt DiBenedetto	Go Fas Racing	Ford	164	10
28	33	23	J. J. Yeley (i)	BK Racing	Toyota	164	0
29	32	96	Jeffrey Earnhardt	Gaunt Brothers Racing	Toyota	163	8
30	24	95	Kasey Kahne	Leavine Family Racing	Chevrolet	162	7
31	36	99	Kyle Weatherman	StarCom Racing	Chevrolet	161	6
32	38	7	Reed Sorenson	Premium Motorsports	Chevrolet	161	5
33	22	43	Bubba Wallace (R)	Richard Petty Motorsports	Chevrolet	153	4
34	37	00	Landon Cassill	StarCom Racing	Chevrolet	148	3
35	35	15	Ross Chastain (i)	Premium Motorsports	Chevrolet	146	0
36	40	66	Timmy Hill (i)	MBM Motorsports	Toyota	142	0
37	25	37	Chris Buescher	JTG Daugherty Racing	Chevrolet	123	1
38	9	2	Brad Keselowski	Team Penske	Ford	121	9
39	34	72	Corey LaJoie	TriStar Motorsports	Chevrolet	95	1
40	39	51	B. J. McLeod (i)	Rick Ware Racing	Chevrolet	77	0
Official race results

=== Race statistics ===
- Lead changes: 13 among 10 different drivers
- Cautions/Laps: 7 for 29 laps
- Red flags: 1 for 10 minutes and 10 seconds
- Time of race: 3 hours, 5 minutes and 43 seconds
- Average speed: 132.460 miles per hour (213.174 km/h)

== Media ==
=== Television ===
NBC Sports covered the race on the television side. Rick Allen, Jeff Burton, Steve Letarte and two-time Pocono winner Dale Earnhardt Jr. called the race from the broadcast booth, while Dave Burns, Marty Snider and Kelli Stavast reported from pit lane.

NBCSN
Booth announcers	Pit reporters
Lap-by-lap: Rick Allen; Color commentator: Jeff Burton; Color commentator: Steve Letarte; Color commentator: Dale Earnhardt Jr.	Dave Burns; Marty Snider; Kelli Stavast

=== Radio ===
Motor Racing Network had the radio call for the race, which was simulcast on SiriusXM's NASCAR Radio channel.

MRN
Booth announcers	Turn announcers	Pit reporters
Lead announcer: Joe Moore; Announcer: Jeff Striegle; Announcer: Rusty Wallace	Turn 1: Dave Moody; Turns 2: Mike Bagley; Turn 3: Kyle Rickey	Alex Hayden; Winston Kelley; Steve Post

== Standings after the race ==
Drivers' Championship standings

	Pos	Driver	Points
	1	Kyle Busch	891
	2	Kevin Harvick	843 (–48)
	3	Martin Truex Jr.	762 (–129)
	4	Joey Logano	690 (–201)
1	5	Clint Bowyer	677 (–214)
1	6	Kurt Busch	677 (–214)
	7	Brad Keselowski	644 (–247)
	8	Kyle Larson	626 (–265)
1	9	Denny Hamlin	618 (–273)
1	10	Ryan Blaney	612 (–279)
	11	Aric Almirola	587 (–304)
1	12	Chase Elliott	569 (–322)
1	13	Jimmie Johnson	547 (–344)
	14	Erik Jones	533 (–358)
	15	Alex Bowman	496 (–395)
	16	Ricky Stenhouse Jr.	440 (–451)
Official driver's standings

Manufacturers' Championship standings

Pos	Manufacturer	Points
1	Toyota	775
2	Ford	752 (–23)
3	Chevrolet	675 (–100)
Official manufacturers' standings

- Note: Only the first 16 positions are included for the driver standings.
- . – Driver has clinched a position in the Monster Energy NASCAR Cup Series playoffs.

== Notes ==
Previous race: 2018 Foxwoods Resort Casino 301	Monster Energy NASCAR Cup Series; 2018 season	Next race: 2018 Go Bowling at The Glen
