= Kelli Stavast =

American sports commentator

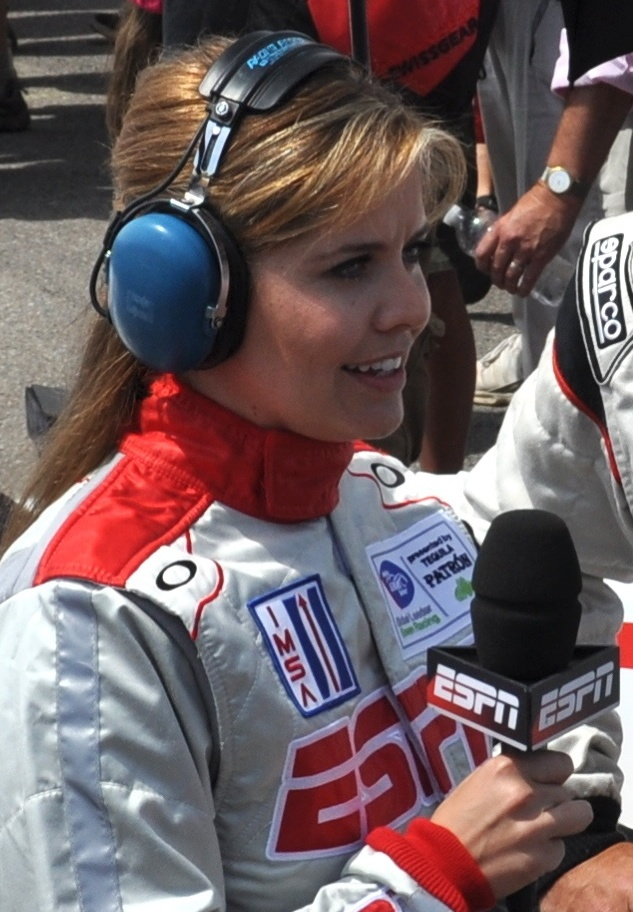
- Stavast in 2011
- Born: Colorado, U.S.
- Occupation: TV sports announcer
- Years active: 2002–2021
- Spouse: Gavin Kelly

Kelli L. Stavast is an American sportscaster who formerly worked for NBC Sports as a pit reporter for both their NASCAR (in both the Cup and Xfinity Series) and IndyCar Series coverage. She has reported for numerous other forms of motorsports throughout her career, as well as diving at the 2016 Summer Olympics in Rio de Janeiro and freestyle skiing at the 2018 Winter Olympics in Pyeongchang.

== Early life and education ==
Stavast was raised in Denver, Colorado. She attended Chapman University where she graduated in 2002 with a broadcast journalism degree.

== Career ==
In 2015, Stavast joined NBC's returning NASCAR coverage as a pit reporter. She was announced to be joining the broadcast team on January 22, 2014, along with Marty Snider. They would be joined by Dave Burns and Mike Massaro (announced later in the year) as NBC's four pit reporters for the NASCAR Cup and Xfinity Series. Stavast was the only original member of the NBC broadcast team hired without prior experience covering NASCAR, although she did report for other forms of motorsports for NBC, Speed, and ESPN including the Grand-Am, American Le Mans Series (and those two series when they merged to become IMSA), Stadium Super Truck Series, and Lucas Oil Off Road Racing Series.

She was also a reporter for NBC coverage of diving at the 2016 Summer Olympics in Rio de Janeiro, as well as freestyle skiing at the 2018 Winter Olympics in Pyongchang. Stavast interviewed skier Madison Olsen.

On October 2, 2021, Stavast interviewed Brandon Brown after his victory at the Xfinity Series' Sparks 300, while the crowd was chanting "Fuck Joe Biden" in the background. During the interview, Stavast misquoted the chant as, "Let's Go Brandon". After footage of the interview went viral, the phrase "Let's Go Brandon" became a political slogan and a meme to mock president Joe Biden as a minced oath. It was Stavast's last race with NBC Sports, who did not retain her for later broadcasts and quietly removed her from the staff directory. Racer writer Kelly Crandall noted in late 2023 that Stavast "has been quiet" since the race.

== Personal life ==
Stavast moved to Las Vegas in 2016 to be with her fiancé Gavin Kelly, who is also an American sportscaster covering NASCAR and IndyCar Series. The couple were introduced to each other through Kurt Busch, who is a close friend of Gavin's.
