= 2018 Toyota/Save Mart 350 =

Race details
- Race 16 of 36 in the 2018 Monster Energy NASCAR Cup Series
- Date: June 24, 2018
- Location: Sonoma Raceway in Sonoma, California
- Course: Permanent racing facility
- Course length: 1.99 miles (3.2 km)
- Distance: 110 laps, 218.9 mi (352 km)
- Average speed: 82.882 miles per hour (133.386 km/h)

Pole position
Driver	Kyle Larson	Chip Ganassi Racing
- Time: 75.732

Most laps led
Driver	Martin Truex Jr.	Furniture Row Racing
- Laps: 62

Winner
No. 78	Martin Truex Jr.	Furniture Row Racing

Television in the United States
- Network: FS1
- Announcers: Mike Joy, Jeff Gordon and Darrell Waltrip
- Nielsen ratings: 1.4/1.6 (Overnight)

Radio in the United States
- Radio: PRN
- Booth announcers: Doug Rice and Mark Garrow
- Turn announcers: Pat Patterson (2, 3 & 3a), Brad Gillie (4a & 7a) and Rob Albright (10 & 11)

The 2018 Toyota/Save Mart 350 was a Monster Energy NASCAR Cup Series race held on June 24, 2018 at Sonoma Raceway in Sonoma, California. Contested over 110 laps on the 1.99-mile (3.20 km) road course, it was the 16th race of the 2018 Monster Energy NASCAR Cup Series season.

== Report ==
=== Background ===
Layout of Sonoma Raceway, the track where the race was held.

Sonoma Raceway, formerly Sears Point Raceway and Infineon Raceway is a 2.52-mile (4.06 km) road course and drag strip located on the landform known as Sears Point in the southern Sonoma Mountains in Sonoma, California, USA. The road course features 12 turns on a hilly course with 160 feet (49 m) of total elevation change. It is host to one of only three Monster Energy NASCAR Cup Series races each year that are run on road courses (the others being Watkins Glen International in Watkins Glen, New York and the road course layout for the Bank of America 500 at Charlotte Motor Speedway). It is also host to the Verizon IndyCar Series and several other auto races and motorcycle races such as the American Federation of Motorcyclists series. Sonoma Raceway continues to host amateur, or club racing events which may or may not be open to the general public. The largest such car club is the Sports Car Club of America.

==== Entry list ====
No.	Driver	Team	Manufacturer
00	Tomy Drissi	StarCom Racing	Chevrolet
1	Jamie McMurray	Chip Ganassi Racing	Chevrolet
2	Brad Keselowski	Team Penske	Ford
3	Austin Dillon	Richard Childress Racing	Chevrolet
4	Kevin Harvick	Stewart–Haas Racing	Ford
6	Trevor Bayne	Roush Fenway Racing	Ford
9	Chase Elliott	Hendrick Motorsports	Chevrolet
10	Aric Almirola	Stewart–Haas Racing	Ford
11	Denny Hamlin	Joe Gibbs Racing	Toyota
12	Ryan Blaney	Team Penske	Ford
13	Ty Dillon	Germain Racing	Chevrolet
14	Clint Bowyer	Stewart–Haas Racing	Ford
15	Justin Marks (i)	Premium Motorsports	Chevrolet
17	Ricky Stenhouse Jr.	Roush Fenway Racing	Ford
18	Kyle Busch	Joe Gibbs Racing	Toyota
19	Daniel Suárez	Joe Gibbs Racing	Toyota
20	Erik Jones	Joe Gibbs Racing	Toyota
21	Paul Menard	Wood Brothers Racing	Ford
22	Joey Logano	Team Penske	Ford
23	Gray Gaulding	BK Racing	Toyota
24	William Byron (R)	Hendrick Motorsports	Chevrolet
31	Ryan Newman	Richard Childress Racing	Chevrolet
32	Matt DiBenedetto	Go Fas Racing	Ford
34	Michael McDowell	Front Row Motorsports	Ford
37	Chris Buescher	JTG Daugherty Racing	Chevrolet
38	David Ragan	Front Row Motorsports	Ford
41	Kurt Busch	Stewart–Haas Racing	Ford
42	Kyle Larson	Chip Ganassi Racing	Chevrolet
43	Bubba Wallace (R)	Richard Petty Motorsports	Chevrolet
47	A. J. Allmendinger	JTG Daugherty Racing	Chevrolet
48	Jimmie Johnson	Hendrick Motorsports	Chevrolet
51	Chris Cook	Rick Ware Racing	Ford
52	Cody Ware	Rick Ware Racing	Chevrolet
72	Cole Whitt	TriStar Motorsports	Chevrolet
78	Martin Truex Jr.	Furniture Row Racing	Toyota
88	Alex Bowman	Hendrick Motorsports	Chevrolet
95	Kasey Kahne	Leavine Family Racing	Chevrolet
96	Parker Kligerman (i)	Gaunt Brothers Racing	Toyota
Official entry list

== Practice ==
=== First practice ===
Clint Bowyer was the fastest in the first practice session with a time of 76.547 seconds and a speed of 93.590 mph (150.619 km/h).

Pos	No.	Driver	Team	Manufacturer	Time	Speed
1	14	Clint Bowyer	Stewart–Haas Racing	Ford	76.547	93.590
2	12	Ryan Blaney	Team Penske	Ford	76.583	93.546
3	22	Joey Logano	Team Penske	Ford	76.890	93.172
Official first practice results

=== Final practice ===
Kurt Busch was the fastest in the final practice session with a time of 76.163 seconds and a speed of 94.061 mph (151.377 km/h).

Pos	No.	Driver	Team	Manufacturer	Time	Speed
1	41	Kurt Busch	Stewart–Haas Racing	Ford	76.163	94.061
2	11	Denny Hamlin	Joe Gibbs Racing	Toyota	76.203	94.012
3	78	Martin Truex Jr.	Furniture Row Racing	Toyota	76.442	93.718
Official final practice results

== Qualifying ==
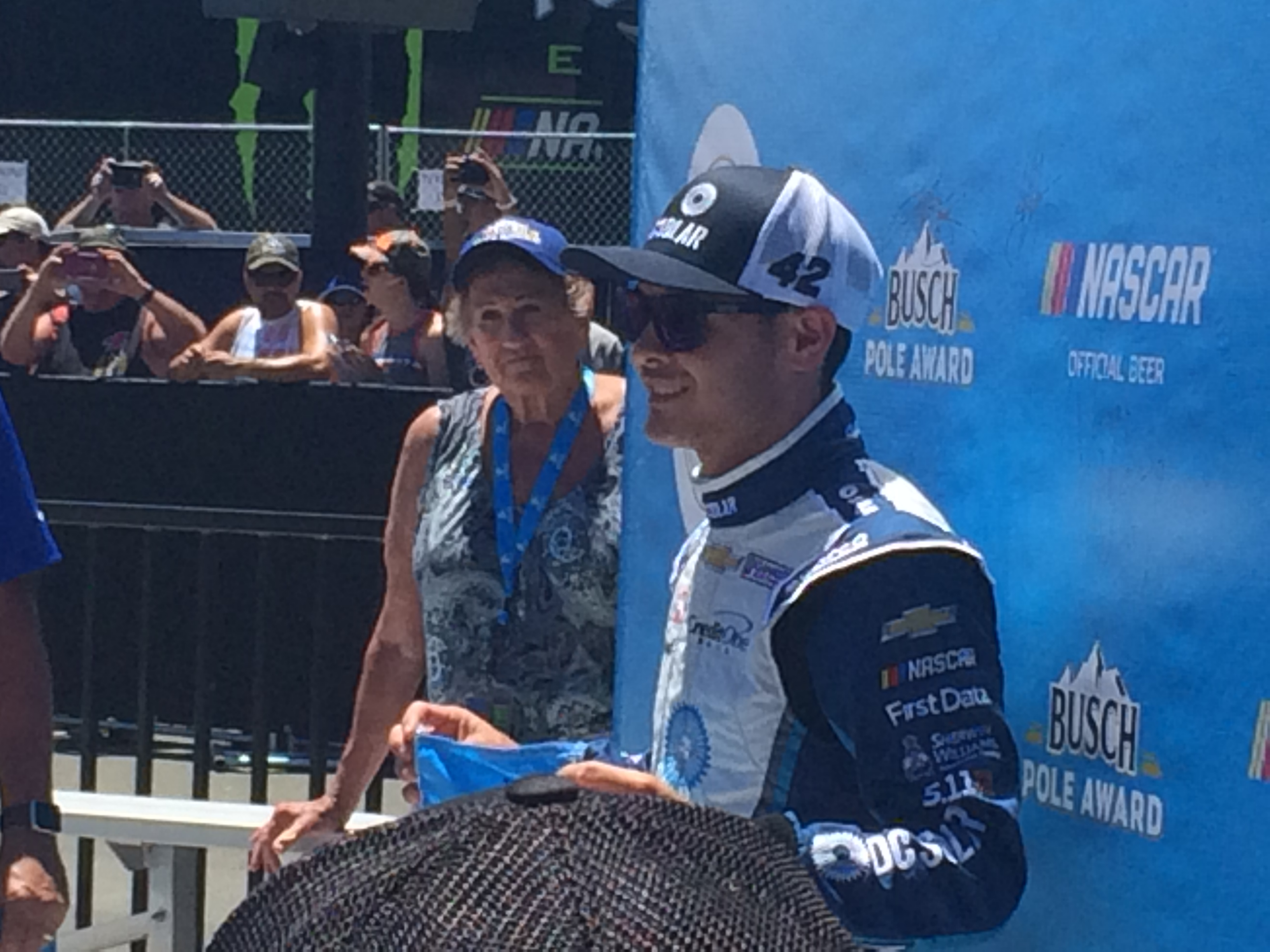
Kyle Larson scored the pole position.

Kyle Larson scored the pole for the race with a time of 75.732 and a speed of 94.597 mph (152.239 km/h).

=== Qualifying results ===
Pos	No.	Driver	Team	Manufacturer	R1	R2
1	42	Kyle Larson	Chip Ganassi Racing	Chevrolet	76.447	75.732
2	78	Martin Truex Jr.	Furniture Row Racing	Toyota	76.019	75.822
3	9	Chase Elliott	Hendrick Motorsports	Chevrolet	76.237	75.841
4	1	Jamie McMurray	Chip Ganassi Racing	Chevrolet	76.434	76.029
5	47	A. J. Allmendinger	JTG Daugherty Racing	Chevrolet	75.828	76.274
6	4	Kevin Harvick	Stewart–Haas Racing	Ford	76.416	76.330
7	48	Jimmie Johnson	Hendrick Motorsports	Chevrolet	76.433	76.356
8	24	William Byron (R)	Hendrick Motorsports	Chevrolet	76.226	76.411
9	18	Kyle Busch	Joe Gibbs Racing	Toyota	76.507	76.474
10	2	Brad Keselowski	Team Penske	Ford	76.354	76.695
11	12	Ryan Blaney	Team Penske	Ford	76.469	76.740
12	22	Joey Logano	Team Penske	Ford	76.337	77.609
13	6	Trevor Bayne	Roush Fenway Racing	Ford	76.657	—
14	31	Ryan Newman	Richard Childress Racing	Chevrolet	76.658	—
15	21	Paul Menard	Wood Brothers Racing	Ford	76.671	—
16	19	Daniel Suárez	Joe Gibbs Racing	Toyota	76.725	—
17	88	Alex Bowman	Hendrick Motorsports	Chevrolet	76.812	—
18	17	Ricky Stenhouse Jr.	Roush Fenway Racing	Ford	76.813	—
19	14	Clint Bowyer	Stewart–Haas Racing	Ford	76.824	—
20	20	Erik Jones	Joe Gibbs Racing	Toyota	76.833	—
21	11	Denny Hamlin	Joe Gibbs Racing	Toyota	76.875	—
22	34	Michael McDowell	Front Row Motorsports	Ford	76.928	—
23	41	Kurt Busch	Stewart–Haas Racing	Ford	76.938	—
24	10	Aric Almirola	Stewart–Haas Racing	Ford	76.978	—
25	37	Chris Buescher	JTG Daugherty Racing	Chevrolet	77.012	—
26	95	Kasey Kahne	Leavine Family Racing	Chevrolet	77.018	—
27	3	Austin Dillon	Richard Childress Racing	Chevrolet	77.090	—
28	38	David Ragan	Front Row Motorsports	Ford	77.457	—
29	23	Gray Gaulding	BK Racing	Toyota	77.536	—
30	32	Matt DiBenedetto	Go Fas Racing	Ford	77.625	—
31	13	Ty Dillon	Germain Racing	Chevrolet	77.664	—
32	72	Cole Whitt	TriStar Motorsports	Chevrolet	77.747	—
33	15	Justin Marks (i)	Premium Motorsports	Chevrolet	77.903	—
34	96	Parker Kligerman (i)	Gaunt Brothers Racing	Toyota	78.276	—
35	43	Bubba Wallace (R)	Richard Petty Motorsports	Chevrolet	78.571	—
36	51	Chris Cook	Rick Ware Racing	Ford	79.129	—
37	00	Tomy Drissi	StarCom Racing	Chevrolet	79.726	—
38	52	Cody Ware	Rick Ware Racing	Chevrolet	80.296	—
Official qualifying results

== Race ==
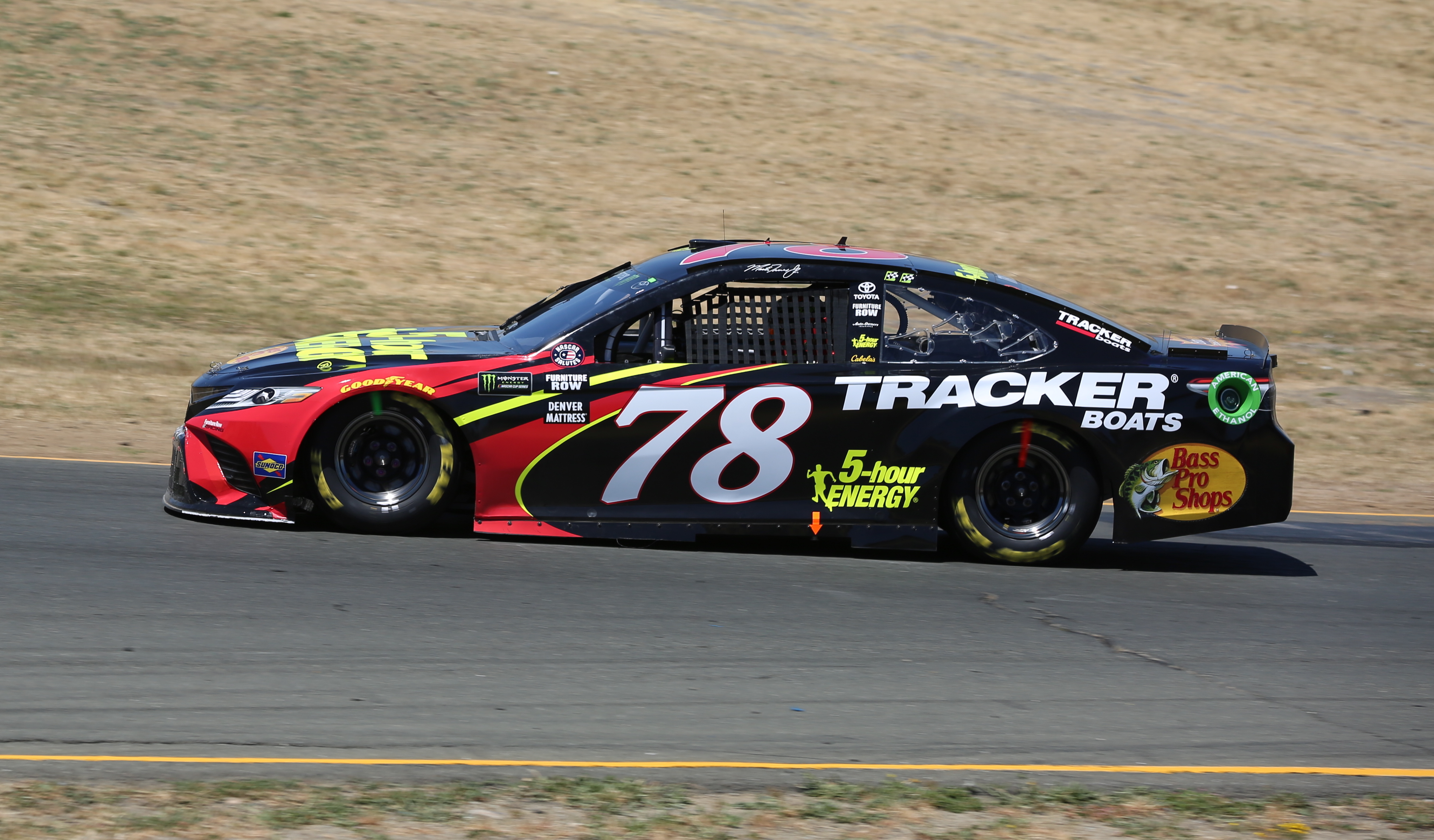
Martin Truex Jr. won the race.

=== Stage Results ===
Stage 1 Laps: 25

Pos	No	Driver	Team	Manufacturer	Points
1	47	A. J. Allmendinger	JTG Daugherty Racing	Chevrolet	10
2	2	Brad Keselowski	Team Penske	Ford	9
3	48	Jimmie Johnson	Hendrick Motorsports	Chevrolet	8
4	9	Chase Elliott	Hendrick Motorsports	Chevrolet	7
5	42	Kyle Larson	Chip Ganassi Racing	Chevrolet	6
6	31	Ryan Newman	Richard Childress Racing	Chevrolet	5
7	10	Aric Almirola	Stewart–Haas Racing	Ford	4
8	19	Daniel Suárez	Joe Gibbs Racing	Toyota	3
9	37	Chris Buescher	JTG Daugherty Racing	Chevrolet	2
10	95	Kasey Kahne	Leavine Family Racing	Chevrolet	1
Official stage one results

Stage 2 Laps: 25

Pos	No	Driver	Team	Manufacturer	Points
1	11	Denny Hamlin	Joe Gibbs Racing	Toyota	10
2	9	Chase Elliott	Hendrick Motorsports	Chevrolet	9
3	48	Jimmie Johnson	Hendrick Motorsports	Chevrolet	8
4	2	Brad Keselowski	Team Penske	Ford	7
5	12	Ryan Blaney	Team Penske	Ford	6
6	10	Aric Almirola	Stewart–Haas Racing	Ford	5
7	88	Alex Bowman	Hendrick Motorsports	Chevrolet	4
8	34	Michael McDowell	Front Row Motorsports	Ford	3
9	37	Chris Buescher	JTG Daugherty Racing	Chevrolet	2
10	31	Ryan Newman	Richard Childress Racing	Chevrolet	1
Official stage two results

=== Final Stage Results ===
Stage 3 Laps: 60

Pos	Grid	No	Driver	Team	Manufacturer	Laps	Points
1	2	78	Martin Truex Jr.	Furniture Row Racing	Toyota	110	40
2	6	4	Kevin Harvick	Stewart–Haas Racing	Ford	110	35
3	19	14	Clint Bowyer	Stewart–Haas Racing	Ford	110	34
4	3	9	Chase Elliott	Hendrick Motorsports	Chevrolet	110	49
5	9	18	Kyle Busch	Joe Gibbs Racing	Toyota	110	32
6	23	41	Kurt Busch	Stewart–Haas Racing	Ford	110	31
7	20	20	Erik Jones	Joe Gibbs Racing	Toyota	110	30
8	24	10	Aric Almirola	Stewart–Haas Racing	Ford	110	38
9	17	88	Alex Bowman	Hendrick Motorsports	Chevrolet	110	32
10	21	11	Denny Hamlin	Joe Gibbs Racing	Toyota	110	37
11	7	48	Jimmie Johnson	Hendrick Motorsports	Chevrolet	110	42
12	25	37	Chris Buescher	JTG Daugherty Racing	Chevrolet	110	29
13	10	2	Brad Keselowski	Team Penske	Ford	110	40
14	1	42	Kyle Larson	Chip Ganassi Racing	Chevrolet	110	29
15	16	19	Daniel Suárez	Joe Gibbs Racing	Toyota	110	25
16	27	3	Austin Dillon	Richard Childress Racing	Chevrolet	110	21
17	30	32	Matt DiBenedetto	Go Fas Racing	Ford	110	20
18	18	17	Ricky Stenhouse Jr.	Roush Fenway Racing	Ford	110	19
19	12	22	Joey Logano	Team Penske	Ford	110	18
20	26	95	Kasey Kahne	Leavine Family Racing	Chevrolet	110	18
21	22	34	Michael McDowell	Front Row Motorsports	Ford	110	19
22	28	38	David Ragan	Front Row Motorsports	Ford	109	15
23	28	96	Parker Kligerman (i)	Gaunt Brothers Racing	Toyota	109	0
24	14	31	Ryan Newman	Richard Childress Racing	Chevrolet	109	19
25	8	24	William Byron (R)	Hendrick Motorsports	Chevrolet	109	12
26	15	21	Paul Menard	Wood Brothers Racing	Ford	109	11
27	13	6	Trevor Bayne	Roush Fenway Racing	Ford	109	10
28	33	15	Justin Marks (i)	Premium Motorsports	Chevrolet	109	0
29	35	43	Bubba Wallace (R)	Richard Petty Motorsports	Chevrolet	109	8
30	29	23	Gray Gaulding	BK Racing	Toyota	109	7
31	36	51	Chris Cook	Rick Ware Racing	Ford	109	6
32	37	00	Tomy Drissi	StarCom Racing	Chevrolet	108	5
33	31	13	Ty Dillon	Germain Racing	Chevrolet	106	4
34	11	12	Ryan Blaney	Team Penske	Ford	104	9
35	32	72	Cole Whitt	TriStar Motorsports	Chevrolet	57	2
36	38	52	Cody Ware	Rick Ware Racing	Chevrolet	42	1
37	4	1	Jamie McMurray	Chip Ganassi Racing	Chevrolet	33	1
38	5	47	A. J. Allmendinger	JTG Daugherty Racing	Chevrolet	33	11
Official race results

=== Race statistics ===
- Lead changes: 7 among different drivers
- Cautions/Laps: 3 for 8
- Red flags: 0
- Time of race: 2 hours, 38 minutes and 28 seconds
- Average speed: 82.882 miles per hour (133.386 km/h)

== Media ==
=== Television ===
Fox NASCAR televised the race in the United States on FS1 for the fourth consecutive year. Mike Joy was the lap-by-lap announcer, while six-time Sonoma winner Jeff Gordon and Darrell Waltrip were the color commentators. Jamie Little, Regan Smith and Matt Yocum reported from pit lane during the race. This is also Fox Sports' last Cup race for their portion of the season as NBC Sports takes over NASCAR broadcasts for the rest of the season.

FS1 Television
Booth announcers	Pit reporters
Lap-by-lap: Mike Joy; Color-commentator: Jeff Gordon; Color commentator: Darrell Waltrip	Jamie Little; Regan Smith; Matt Yocum

=== Radio ===
Radio coverage of the race was broadcast by Performance Racing Network. PRN's broadcast of the race was simulcasted on Sirius XM NASCAR Radio. Doug Rice and Mark Garrow announced the race in the booth while the field was racing on the pit straight. Pat Patterson called the race from a stand outside of turn 2 when the field was racing up turns 2, 3 and 3a. Brad Gillie called the race from a stand outside of turn 7a when the field was racing through turns 4a and 7a. The field came back into the view of the booth in turns 8 and 9. Rob Albright called the race from a billboard outside turn 11 when the field was racing through turns 10 and 11. Heather DeBeaux, Brett McMillan and Jim Noble reported from pit lane during the race.

PRN
Booth announcers	Turn announcers	Pit reporters
Lead announcer: Doug Rice; Announcer: Mark Garrow	Turns 2, 3 & 3a: Pat Patterson; Turns 4a & 7a: Brad Gillie; Turns 10 & 11: Rob Albright	Heather DeBeaux; Brett McMillan; Jim Noble

== Standings after the race ==
Drivers' Championship standings

	Pos	Driver	Points
	1	Kyle Busch	696
	2	Kevin Harvick	624 (–72)
	3	Joey Logano	584 (–112)
	4	Brad Keselowski	554 (–142)
1	5	Martin Truex Jr.	546 (–150)
1	6	Clint Bowyer	544 (–152)
	7	Kurt Busch	524 (–172)
	8	Denny Hamlin	505 (–191)
1	9	Kyle Larson	472 (–224)
1	10	Aric Almirola	471 (–225)
2	11	Ryan Blaney	466 (–230)
	12	Jimmie Johnson	419 (–277)
	13	Chase Elliott	411 (–285)
	14	Erik Jones	376 (–320)
	15	Alex Bowman	363 (–333)
	16	Ricky Stenhouse Jr.	346 (–350)
Official driver's standings

Manufacturers' Championship standings

Pos	Manufacturer	Points
1	Ford	580
2	Toyota	580 (–0)
3	Chevrolet	512 (–68)
Official manufacturers' standings

- Note: Only the first 16 positions are included for the driver standings.
- . – Driver has clinched a position in the Monster Energy NASCAR Cup Series playoffs.

Previous race: 2018 FireKeepers Casino 400	Monster Energy NASCAR Cup Series; 2018 season	Next race: 2018 Overton's 400
