= 2018 Pocono 400 =

Race details
- Race 14 of 36 in the 2018 Monster Energy NASCAR Cup Series
- 2018 Pocono 400 program cover
- Date: June 3, 2018
- Location: Pocono Raceway in Long Pond, Pennsylvania
- Course: Permanent racing facility
- Course length: 2.5 miles (4 km)
- Distance: 160 laps, 400 mi (640 km)
- Average speed: 139.535 miles per hour (224.560 km/h)

Pole position
Driver	Ryan Blaney	Team Penske
- Time: 50.877

Most laps led
Driver	Kevin Harvick	Stewart–Haas Racing
- Laps: 89

Winner
No. 78	Martin Truex Jr.	Furniture Row Racing

Television in the United States
- Network: FS1
- Announcers: Mike Joy, Jeff Gordon and Darrell Waltrip
- Nielsen ratings: 1.6

Radio in the United States
- Radio: MRN
- Booth announcers: Joe Moore, Jeff Striegle and Rusty Wallace
- Turn announcers: Dave Moody (1), Mike Bagley (2) and Kurt Becker (3)

The 2018 Pocono 400 was a Monster Energy NASCAR Cup Series race held on June 3, 2018 at Pocono Raceway in Long Pond, Pennsylvania. Contested over 160 laps on the 2.5-mile (4.0 km) triangular racecourse, it was the 14th race of the 2018 Monster Energy NASCAR Cup Series season.

== Report ==
=== Background ===
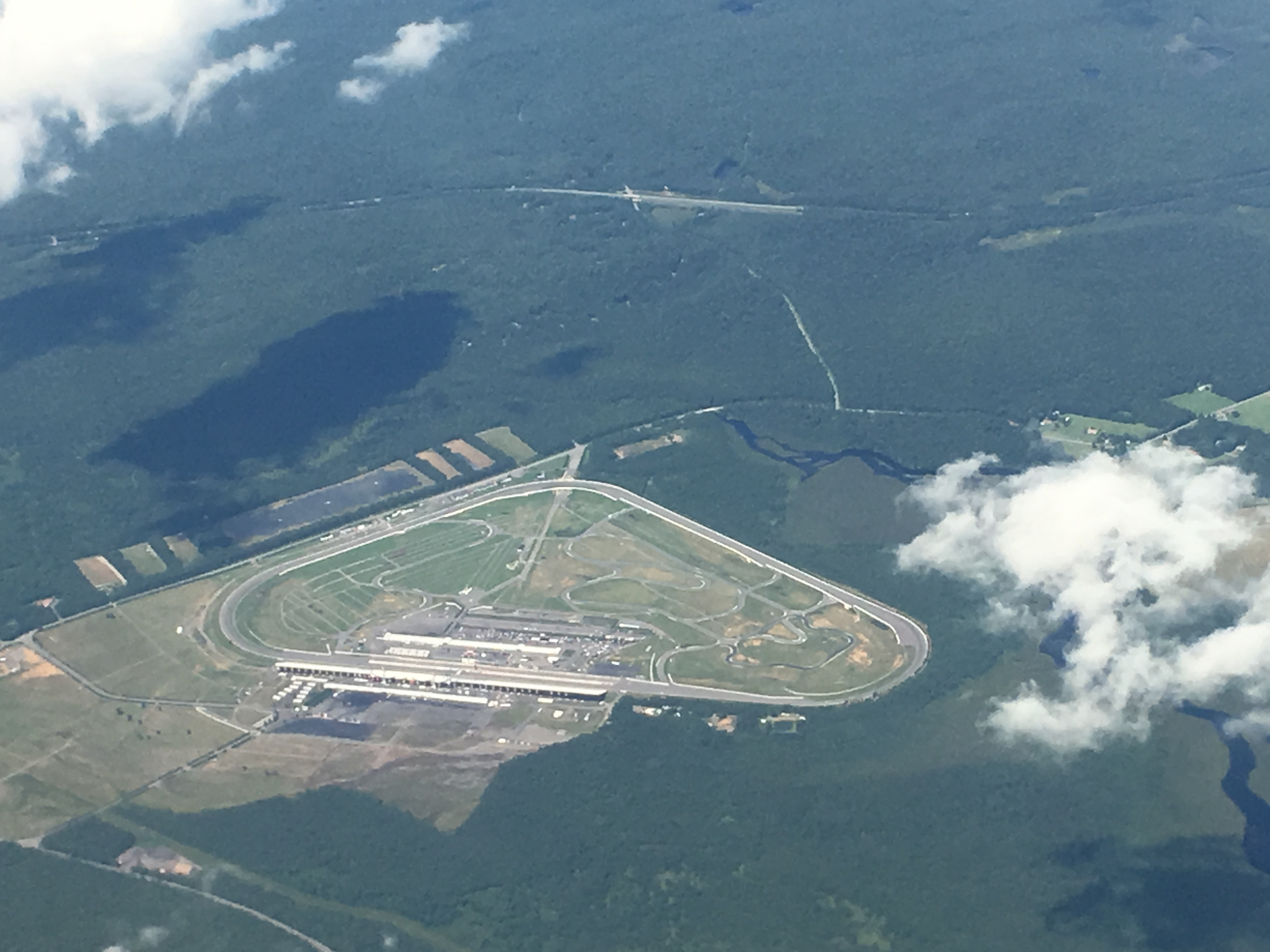
Aerial photo of Pocono Raceway from a plane in August 2018.

The race was held at Pocono Raceway, which is a three-turn superspeedway located in Long Pond, Pennsylvania. The track hosts two annual Monster Energy NASCAR Cup Series races: the Pocono 400 and the Gander Outdoors 400, as well as one Xfinity Series and Camping World Truck Series event. Since 2013, the track is also host to a IndyCar Series race.

Pocono Raceway is one of a very few NASCAR tracks not owned by either Speedway Motorsports or NASCAR. It is operated by the Igdalsky siblings Brandon, Nicholas, and sister Ashley, and cousins Joseph IV and Chase Mattioli, all of whom are third-generation members of the family-owned Mattco Inc, started by Joseph II and Rose Mattioli.

Outside of the NASCAR races, the track is used throughout the year by Sports Car Club of America (SCCA) and motorcycle clubs as well as racing schools and an IndyCar race. The triangular oval also has three separate infield sections of racetrack – North Course, East Course and South Course. Each of these infield sections use a separate portion of the tri-oval to complete the track. During regular non-race weekends, multiple clubs can use the track by running on different infield sections. Also some of the infield sections can be run in either direction, or multiple infield sections can be put together – such as running the North Course and the South Course and using the tri-oval to connect the two.

==== Entry list ====
No.	Driver	Team	Manufacturer
00	Landon Cassill	StarCom Racing	Chevrolet
1	Jamie McMurray	Chip Ganassi Racing	Chevrolet
2	Brad Keselowski	Team Penske	Ford
3	Austin Dillon	Richard Childress Racing	Chevrolet
4	Kevin Harvick	Stewart–Haas Racing	Ford
6	Matt Kenseth	Roush Fenway Racing	Ford
7	J. J. Yeley (i)	Premium Motorsports	Chevrolet
9	Chase Elliott	Hendrick Motorsports	Chevrolet
10	Aric Almirola	Stewart–Haas Racing	Ford
11	Denny Hamlin	Joe Gibbs Racing	Toyota
12	Ryan Blaney	Team Penske	Ford
13	Ty Dillon	Germain Racing	Chevrolet
14	Clint Bowyer	Stewart–Haas Racing	Ford
15	Ross Chastain (i)	Premium Motorsports	Chevrolet
17	Ricky Stenhouse Jr.	Roush Fenway Racing	Ford
18	Kyle Busch	Joe Gibbs Racing	Toyota
19	Daniel Suárez	Joe Gibbs Racing	Toyota
20	Erik Jones	Joe Gibbs Racing	Toyota
21	Paul Menard	Wood Brothers Racing	Ford
22	Joey Logano	Team Penske	Ford
23	Gray Gaulding	BK Racing	Toyota
24	William Byron (R)	Hendrick Motorsports	Chevrolet
31	Ryan Newman	Richard Childress Racing	Chevrolet
32	Matt DiBenedetto	Go Fas Racing	Ford
34	Michael McDowell	Front Row Motorsports	Ford
37	Chris Buescher	JTG Daugherty Racing	Chevrolet
38	David Ragan	Front Row Motorsports	Ford
41	Kurt Busch	Stewart–Haas Racing	Ford
42	Kyle Larson	Chip Ganassi Racing	Chevrolet
43	Bubba Wallace (R)	Richard Petty Motorsports	Chevrolet
47	A. J. Allmendinger	JTG Daugherty Racing	Chevrolet
48	Jimmie Johnson	Hendrick Motorsports	Chevrolet
51	Cole Custer (i)	Rick Ware Racing	Ford
72	Cole Whitt	TriStar Motorsports	Chevrolet
78	Martin Truex Jr.	Furniture Row Racing	Toyota
88	Alex Bowman	Hendrick Motorsports	Chevrolet
95	Kasey Kahne	Leavine Family Racing	Chevrolet
99	Derrike Cope	StarCom Racing	Chevrolet
Official entry list

== First practice ==
Kyle Busch was the fastest in the first practice session with a time of 50.865 seconds and a speed of 176.939 mph (284.756 km/h).

Pos	No.	Driver	Team	Manufacturer	Time	Speed
1	18	Kyle Busch	Joe Gibbs Racing	Toyota	50.865	176.939
2	88	Alex Bowman	Hendrick Motorsports	Chevrolet	51.285	175.490
3	14	Clint Bowyer	Stewart–Haas Racing	Ford	51.286	175.486
Official first practice results

== Qualifying ==
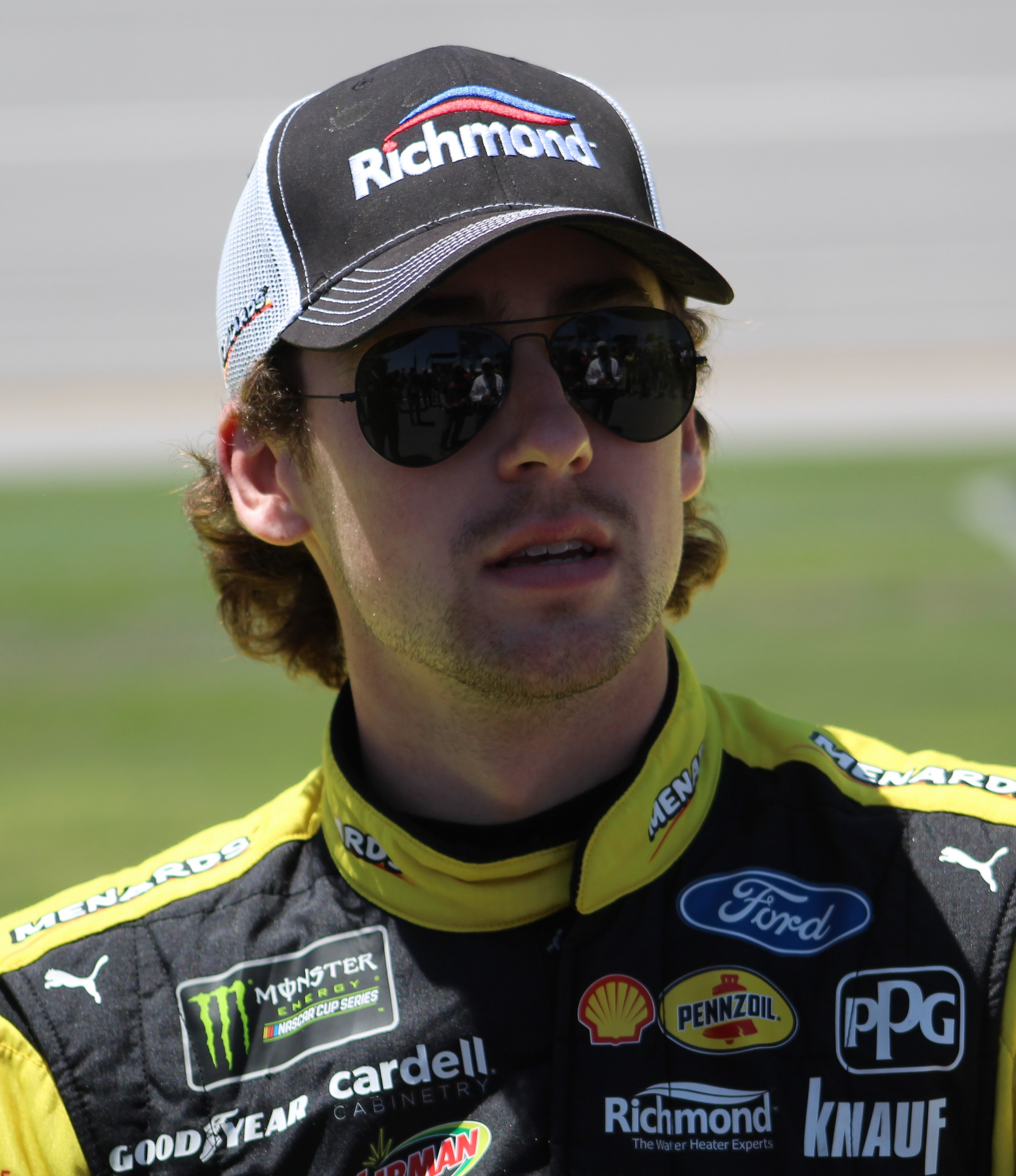
Ryan Blaney scored the pole position.

Ryan Blaney scored the pole for the race with a time of 50.877 and a speed of 176.897 mph (284.688 km/h).

=== Qualifying results ===
Pos	No.	Driver	Team	Manufacturer	R1	R2	R3
1	12	Ryan Blaney	Team Penske	Ford	51.369	51.217	50.877
2	4	Kevin Harvick	Stewart–Haas Racing	Ford	51.151	51.068	50.903
3	1	Jamie McMurray	Chip Ganassi Racing	Chevrolet	51.473	51.300	50.955
4	78	Martin Truex Jr.	Furniture Row Racing	Toyota	51.384	51.272	50.987
5	18	Kyle Busch	Joe Gibbs Racing	Toyota	51.532	51.132	50.998
6	41	Kurt Busch	Stewart–Haas Racing	Ford	51.366	51.290	51.076
7	22	Joey Logano	Team Penske	Ford	51.738	51.388	51.083
8	31	Ryan Newman	Richard Childress Racing	Chevrolet	51.688	51.241	51.176
9	14	Clint Bowyer	Stewart–Haas Racing	Ford	51.402	51.457	51.195
10	11	Denny Hamlin	Joe Gibbs Racing	Toyota	51.345	51.327	51.197
11	9	Chase Elliott	Hendrick Motorsports	Chevrolet	51.404	51.256	51.361
12	3	Austin Dillon	Richard Childress Racing	Chevrolet	51.921	51.497	51.520
13	42	Kyle Larson	Chip Ganassi Racing	Chevrolet	51.193	51.524	—
14	88	Alex Bowman	Hendrick Motorsports	Chevrolet	51.494	51.579	—
15	48	Jimmie Johnson	Hendrick Motorsports	Chevrolet	51.487	51.616	—
16	24	William Byron (R)	Hendrick Motorsports	Chevrolet	51.460	51.649	—
17	2	Brad Keselowski	Team Penske	Ford	51.642	51.661	—
18	19	Daniel Suárez	Joe Gibbs Racing	Toyota	51.565	51.690	—
19	43	Bubba Wallace (R)	Richard Petty Motorsports	Chevrolet	51.726	51.811	—
20	21	Paul Menard	Wood Brothers Racing	Ford	51.650	51.833	—
21	38	David Ragan	Front Row Motorsports	Ford	51.929	51.934	—
22	95	Kasey Kahne	Leavine Family Racing	Chevrolet	51.766	52.024	—
23	17	Ricky Stenhouse Jr.	Roush Fenway Racing	Ford	51.972	52.182	—
24	47	A. J. Allmendinger	JTG Daugherty Racing	Chevrolet	52.007	0.000	—
25	20	Erik Jones	Joe Gibbs Racing	Toyota	52.081	—	—
26	6	Matt Kenseth	Roush Fenway Racing	Ford	52.140	—	—
27	37	Chris Buescher	JTG Daugherty Racing	Chevrolet	52.187	—	—
28	51	Cole Custer (i)	Rick Ware Racing	Ford	52.197	—	—
29	13	Ty Dillon	Germain Racing	Chevrolet	52.658	—	—
30	34	Michael McDowell	Front Row Motorsports	Ford	52.703	—	—
31	15	Ross Chastain (i)	Premium Motorsports	Chevrolet	52.908	—	—
32	32	Matt DiBenedetto	Go Fas Racing	Ford	53.354	—	—
33	00	Landon Cassill	StarCom Racing	Chevrolet	53.477	—	—
34	10	Aric Almirola	Stewart–Haas Racing	Ford	53.855	—	—
35	72	Cole Whitt	TriStar Motorsports	Chevrolet	53.882	—	—
36	23	Gray Gaulding	BK Racing	Toyota	53.927	—	—
37	7	J. J. Yeley (i)	Premium Motorsports	Chevrolet	53.935	—	—
38	99	Derrike Cope	StarCom Racing	Chevrolet	54.753	—	—
Official qualifying results

== Final practice ==
Kyle Busch was the fastest in the final practice session with a time of 51.550 seconds and a speed of 174.588 mph (280.972 km/h).

Pos	No.	Driver	Team	Manufacturer	Time	Speed
1	18	Kyle Busch	Joe Gibbs Racing	Toyota	51.550	174.588
2	4	Kevin Harvick	Stewart–Haas Racing	Ford	51.690	174.115
3	78	Martin Truex Jr.	Furniture Row Racing	Toyota	51.738	173.953
Official final practice results

== Race ==
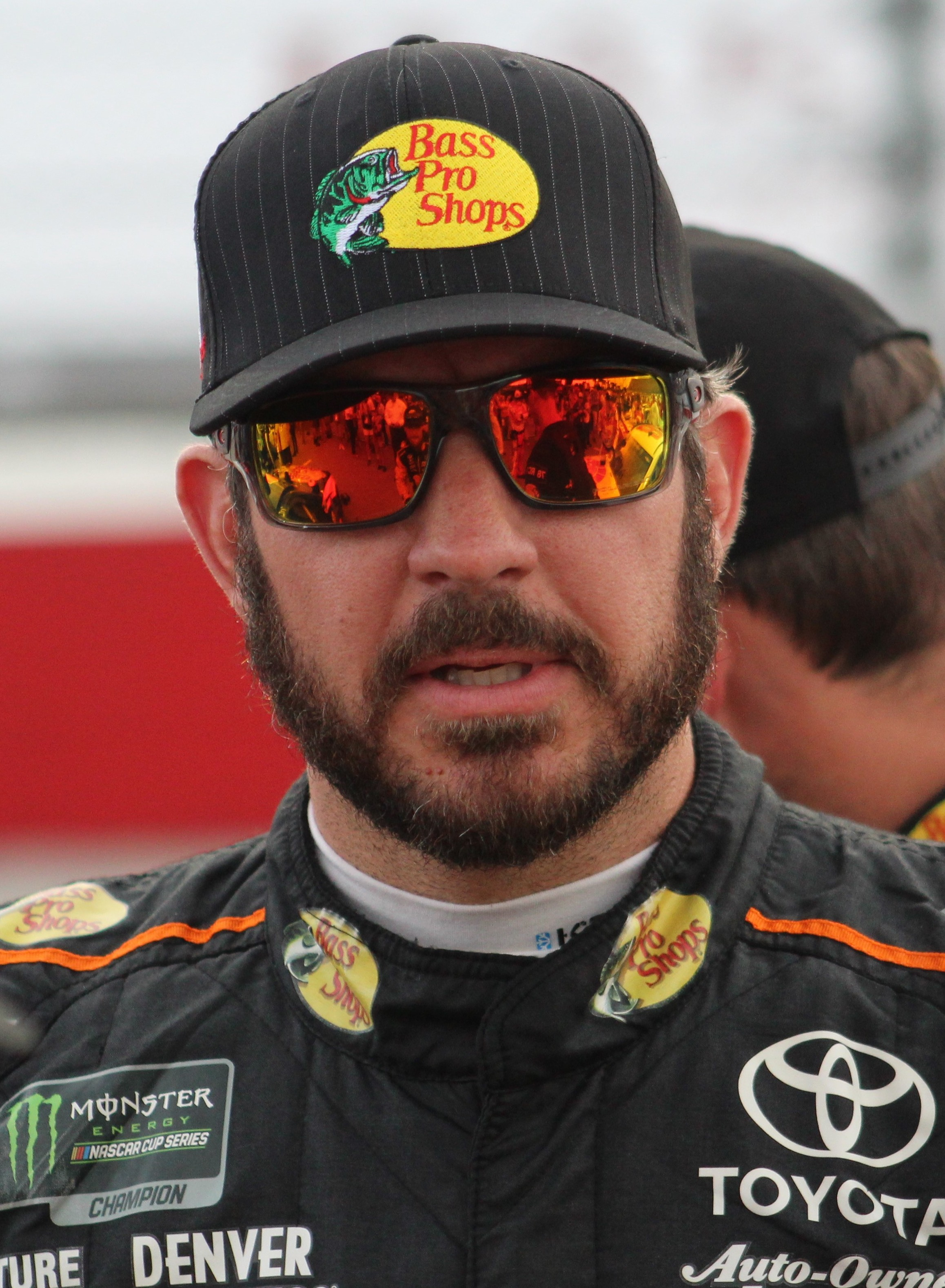
Martin Truex Jr. won the race.

=== Stage Results ===
Stage 1 Laps: 50

Pos	No	Driver	Team	Manufacturer	Points
1	78	Martin Truex Jr.	Furniture Row Racing	Toyota	10
2	4	Kevin Harvick	Stewart–Haas Racing	Ford	9
3	18	Kyle Busch	Joe Gibbs Racing	Toyota	8
4	14	Clint Bowyer	Stewart–Haas Racing	Ford	7
5	11	Denny Hamlin	Joe Gibbs Racing	Toyota	6
6	9	Chase Elliott	Hendrick Motorsports	Chevrolet	5
7	12	Ryan Blaney	Team Penske	Ford	4
8	42	Kyle Larson	Chip Ganassi Racing	Chevrolet	3
9	48	Jimmie Johnson	Hendrick Motorsports	Chevrolet	2
10	2	Brad Keselowski	Team Penske	Ford	1
Official stage one results

Stage 2 Laps: 50

Pos	No	Driver	Team	Manufacturer	Points
1	4	Kevin Harvick	Stewart–Haas Racing	Ford	10
2	18	Kyle Busch	Joe Gibbs Racing	Toyota	9
3	14	Clint Bowyer	Stewart–Haas Racing	Ford	8
4	78	Martin Truex Jr.	Furniture Row Racing	Toyota	7
5	9	Chase Elliott	Hendrick Motorsports	Chevrolet	6
6	42	Kyle Larson	Chip Ganassi Racing	Chevrolet	5
7	2	Brad Keselowski	Team Penske	Ford	4
8	12	Ryan Blaney	Team Penske	Ford	3
9	48	Jimmie Johnson	Hendrick Motorsports	Chevrolet	2
10	88	Alex Bowman	Hendrick Motorsports	Chevrolet	1
Official stage two results

=== Final Stage Results ===
Stage 3 Laps: 60

Pos	Grid	No	Driver	Team	Manufacturer	Laps	Points
1	4	78	Martin Truex Jr.	Furniture Row Racing	Toyota	160	57
2	13	42	Kyle Larson	Chip Ganassi Racing	Chevrolet	160	43
3	5	18	Kyle Busch	Joe Gibbs Racing	Toyota	160	51
4	2	4	Kevin Harvick	Stewart–Haas Racing	Ford	160	52
5	17	2	Brad Keselowski	Team Penske	Ford	160	37
6	1	12	Ryan Blaney	Team Penske	Ford	160	38
7	34	10	Aric Almirola	Stewart–Haas Racing	Ford	160	30
8	15	48	Jimmie Johnson	Hendrick Motorsports	Chevrolet	160	33
9	7	22	Joey Logano	Team Penske	Ford	160	28
10	11	9	Chase Elliott	Hendrick Motorsports	Chevrolet	160	38
11	20	21	Paul Menard	Wood Brothers Racing	Ford	160	26
12	12	3	Austin Dillon	Richard Childress Racing	Chevrolet	160	25
13	26	6	Matt Kenseth	Roush Fenway Racing	Ford	160	24
14	23	17	Ricky Stenhouse Jr.	Roush Fenway Racing	Ford	160	23
15	3	1	Jamie McMurray	Chip Ganassi Racing	Chevrolet	160	22
16	21	38	David Ragan	Front Row Motorsports	Ford	160	21
17	27	37	Chris Buescher	JTG Daugherty Racing	Chevrolet	160	20
18	16	24	William Byron (R)	Hendrick Motorsports	Chevrolet	160	19
19	6	41	Kurt Busch	Stewart–Haas Racing	Ford	160	18
20	9	14	Clint Bowyer	Stewart–Haas Racing	Ford	160	32
21	30	34	Michael McDowell	Front Row Motorsports	Ford	160	16
22	24	47	A. J. Allmendinger	JTG Daugherty Racing	Chevrolet	160	15
23	29	13	Ty Dillon	Germain Racing	Chevrolet	160	14
24	18	19	Daniel Suárez	Joe Gibbs Racing	Toyota	160	13
25	8	31	Ryan Newman	Richard Childress Racing	Chevrolet	160	12
26	28	51	Cole Custer (i)	Rick Ware Racing	Ford	160	0
27	14	88	Alex Bowman	Hendrick Motorsports	Chevrolet	160	11
28	31	15	Ross Chastain (i)	Premium Motorsports	Chevrolet	159	0
29	25	20	Erik Jones	Joe Gibbs Racing	Toyota	159	8
30	35	72	Cole Whitt	TriStar Motorsports	Chevrolet	158	7
31	33	00	Landon Cassill	StarCom Racing	Chevrolet	157	6
32	37	7	J. J. Yeley (i)	Premium Motorsports	Chevrolet	157	0
33	36	23	Gray Gaulding	BK Racing	Toyota	157	4
34	38	99	Derrike Cope	StarCom Racing	Chevrolet	152	3
35	10	11	Denny Hamlin	Joe Gibbs Racing	Toyota	146	8
36	22	95	Kasey Kahne	Leavine Family Racing	Chevrolet	120	1
37	32	32	Matt DiBenedetto	Go Fas Racing	Ford	113	1
38	19	43	Bubba Wallace (R)	Richard Petty Motorsports	Chevrolet	108	1
Official race results

=== Race statistics ===
- Lead changes: 7 among different drivers
- Cautions/Laps: 6 for 23
- Red flags: 0
- Time of race: 2 hours, 52 minutes and 0 seconds
- Average speed: 139.535 miles per hour (224.560 km/h)

== Media ==
=== Television ===
Fox NASCAR televised the race in the United States on FS1 for the fourth consecutive year. Mike Joy was the lap-by-lap announcer, while six-time Pocono winner, Jeff Gordon and four-time winner Darrell Waltrip were the color commentators. Jamie Little, Vince Welch and Matt Yocum reported from pit lane during the race.

FS1 Television
Booth announcers	Pit reporters
Lap-by-lap: Mike Joy; Color-commentator: Jeff Gordon; Color commentator: Darrell Waltrip	Jamie Little; Vince Welch; Matt Yocum

=== Radio ===
Radio coverage of the race was broadcast by Motor Racing Network (MRN) and simulcasted on Sirius XM NASCAR Radio. Joe Moore, Jeff Striegle and four-time Pocono winner Rusty Wallace announced the race in the booth while the field was racing on the front stretch. Dave Moody called the race from atop a billboard outside of turn 1 when the field was racing through turn 1 while Mike Bagley called the race from a billboard outside turn 2 when the field was racing through turn 2. Kurt Becker reported the race from a billboard outside turn 3 when the field was racing through turn 3. Alex Hayden, Winston Kelley and Steve Post reported from pit lane during the race.

MRN
Booth announcers	Turn announcers	Pit reporters
Lead announcer: Joe Moore; Announcer: Jeff Striegle; Announcer: Rusty Wallace	Turn 1: Dave Moody; Turn 2: Mike Bagley; Turn 3: Kurt Becker	Alex Hayden; Winston Kelley; Steve Post

== Standings after the race ==
Drivers' Championship standings

	Pos	Driver	Points
	1	Kyle Busch	624
1	2	Kevin Harvick	537 (–87)
1	3	Joey Logano	534 (–90)
1	4	Martin Truex Jr.	487 (–137)
1	5	Brad Keselowski	474 (–150)
2	6	Clint Bowyer	453 (–171)
1	7	Kurt Busch	447 (–177)
1	8	Denny Hamlin	437 (–187)
	9	Kyle Larson	425 (–199)
1	10	Ryan Blaney	413 (–211)
1	11	Aric Almirola	406 (–218)
	12	Jimmie Johnson	360 (–264)
2	13	Chase Elliott	334 (–290)
1	14	Erik Jones	322 (–302)
1	15	Ricky Stenhouse Jr.	319 (–305)
2	16	Alex Bowman	310 (–314)
Official driver's standings

Manufacturers' Championship standings

	Pos	Manufacturer	Points
1	1	Toyota	507
1	2	Ford	505 (–2)
	3	Chevrolet	451 (–56)
Official manufacturers' standings

- Note: Only the first 16 positions are included for the driver standings.
- . – Driver has clinched a position in the Monster Energy NASCAR Cup Series playoffs.

Previous race: 2018 Coca-Cola 600	Monster Energy NASCAR Cup Series; 2018 season	Next race: 2018 FireKeepers Casino 400
