= 2018 Coke Zero Sugar 400 =

Race details
- Race 18 of 36 in the 2018 Monster Energy NASCAR Cup Series
- Date: July 7, 2018
- Location: Daytona International Speedway in Daytona Beach, Florida
- Course: Permanent racing facility
- Course length: 2.5 miles (4.023 km)
- Distance: 168 laps, 420 mi (675.924 km)
- Scheduled distance: 160 laps, 400 mi (643.738 km)
- Average speed: 130.435 miles per hour (209.915 km/h)

Pole position
Driver	Chase Elliott	Hendrick Motorsports
- Time: 46.381

Most laps led
Driver	Ricky Stenhouse Jr.	Roush Fenway Racing
- Laps: 51

Winner
No. 20	Erik Jones	Joe Gibbs Racing

Television in the United States
- Network: NBC
- Announcers: Rick Allen, Jeff Burton and Dale Earnhardt Jr. (booth); Mike Tirico and Steve Letarte (NBC Peacock Pitbox)
- Nielsen ratings: 2.7/2.72 (Overnight)

Radio in the United States
- Radio: MRN
- Booth announcers: Joe Moore, Jeff Striegle and Rusty Wallace
- Turn announcers: Dave Moody (1 & 2), Mike Bagley (Backstretch) and Kurt Becker (3 & 4)

The 2018 Coke Zero Sugar 400 was a Monster Energy NASCAR Cup Series race held on July 7, 2018, at Daytona International Speedway in Daytona Beach, Florida. Contested over 168 laps – extended from 160 laps due to two overtime finish attempts – on the 2.5-mile (4.0-kilometre) superspeedway, it was the 18th race of the 2018 Monster Energy NASCAR Cup Series season. Erik Jones scored his first NASCAR Cup Series win, taking the first win for Toyota and Joe Gibbs Racing in a July Daytona race since 2008.

It was the first race in NASCAR Cup Series history to have two female pit members.

== Entry list ==
No.	Driver	Team	Manufacturer
00	Joey Gase (i)	StarCom Racing	Chevrolet
1	Jamie McMurray	Chip Ganassi Racing	Chevrolet
2	Brad Keselowski	Team Penske	Ford
3	Austin Dillon	Richard Childress Racing	Chevrolet
4	Kevin Harvick	Stewart–Haas Racing	Ford
6	Trevor Bayne	Roush Fenway Racing	Ford
7	Jeffrey Earnhardt	Premium Motorsports	Chevrolet
9	Chase Elliott	Hendrick Motorsports	Chevrolet
10	Aric Almirola	Stewart–Haas Racing	Ford
11	Denny Hamlin	Joe Gibbs Racing	Toyota
12	Ryan Blaney	Team Penske	Ford
13	Ty Dillon	Germain Racing	Chevrolet
14	Clint Bowyer	Stewart–Haas Racing	Ford
15	Ross Chastain (i)	Premium Motorsports	Chevrolet
17	Ricky Stenhouse Jr.	Roush Fenway Racing	Ford
18	Kyle Busch	Joe Gibbs Racing	Toyota
19	Daniel Suárez	Joe Gibbs Racing	Toyota
20	Erik Jones	Joe Gibbs Racing	Toyota
21	Paul Menard	Wood Brothers Racing	Ford
22	Joey Logano	Team Penske	Ford
23	J. J. Yeley (i)	BK Racing	Toyota
24	William Byron (R)	Hendrick Motorsports	Chevrolet
31	Ryan Newman	Richard Childress Racing	Chevrolet
32	Matt DiBenedetto	Go Fas Racing	Ford
34	Michael McDowell	Front Row Motorsports	Ford
37	Chris Buescher	JTG Daugherty Racing	Chevrolet
38	David Ragan	Front Row Motorsports	Ford
41	Kurt Busch	Stewart–Haas Racing	Ford
42	Kyle Larson	Chip Ganassi Racing	Chevrolet
43	Bubba Wallace (R)	Richard Petty Motorsports	Chevrolet
47	A. J. Allmendinger	JTG Daugherty Racing	Chevrolet
48	Jimmie Johnson	Hendrick Motorsports	Chevrolet
51	Ray Black Jr. (i)	Rick Ware Racing	Chevrolet
62	Brendan Gaughan	Beard Motorsports	Chevrolet
72	Corey LaJoie	TriStar Motorsports	Chevrolet
78	Martin Truex Jr.	Furniture Row Racing	Toyota
88	Alex Bowman	Hendrick Motorsports	Chevrolet
92	Timothy Peters (i)	RBR Enterprises	Ford
95	Kasey Kahne	Leavine Family Racing	Chevrolet
96	D. J. Kennington	Gaunt Brothers Racing	Toyota
99	Landon Cassill	StarCom Racing	Chevrolet
Official entry list

== Practice ==
=== First practice ===
Clint Bowyer was the fastest in the first practice session with a time of 44.821 seconds and a speed of 200.799 mph (323.155 km/h).

Pos	No.	Driver	Team	Manufacturer	Time	Speed
1	14	Clint Bowyer	Stewart–Haas Racing	Ford	44.821	200.799
2	10	Aric Almirola	Stewart–Haas Racing	Ford	44.845	200.691
3	2	Brad Keselowski	Team Penske	Ford	44.876	200.553
Official first practice results

=== Final practice ===
Final practice session for Thursday was cancelled due to rain.

== Qualifying ==
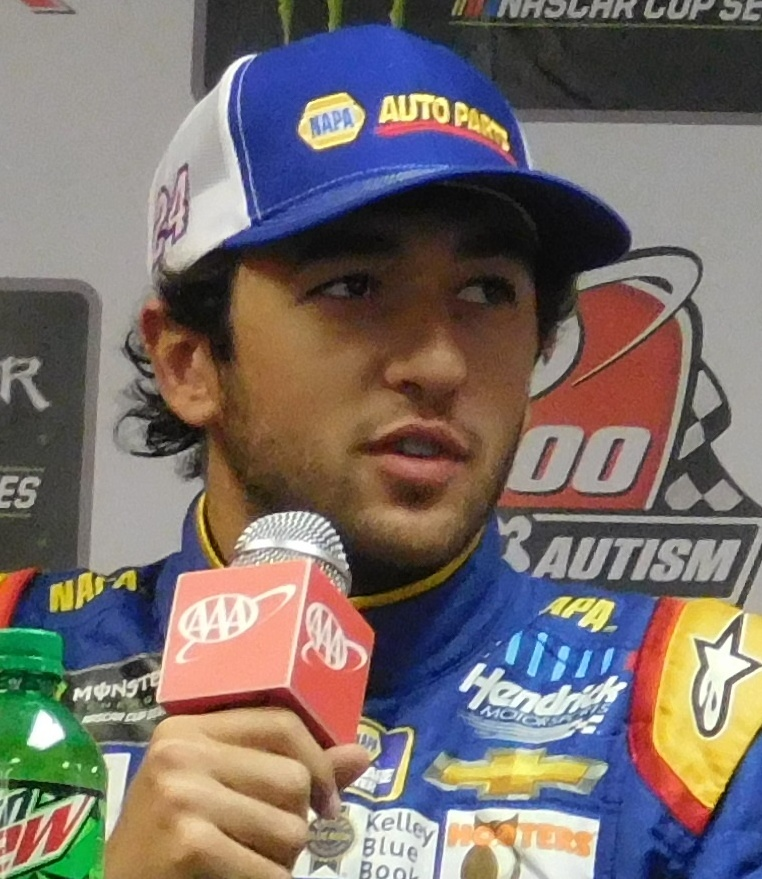
Chase Elliott scored the pole position.

Chase Elliott scored the pole for the race with a time of 46.381 and a speed of 194.045 mph (312.285 km/h).

=== Qualifying results ===
Pos	No.	Driver	Team	Manufacturer	R1	R2
1	9	Chase Elliott	Hendrick Motorsports	Chevrolet	46.394	46.381
2	88	Alex Bowman	Hendrick Motorsports	Chevrolet	46.647	46.621
3	2	Brad Keselowski	Team Penske	Ford	46.778	46.680
4	48	Jimmie Johnson	Hendrick Motorsports	Chevrolet	46.708	46.787
5	4	Kevin Harvick	Stewart–Haas Racing	Ford	46.777	46.791
6	17	Ricky Stenhouse Jr.	Roush Fenway Racing	Ford	46.832	46.835
7	31	Ryan Newman	Richard Childress Racing	Chevrolet	46.931	46.921
8	34	Michael McDowell	Front Row Motorsports	Ford	46.938	46.956
9	14	Clint Bowyer	Stewart–Haas Racing	Ford	46.987	47.011
10	3	Austin Dillon	Richard Childress Racing	Chevrolet	47.054	47.047
11	22	Joey Logano	Team Penske	Ford	47.045	47.083
12	12	Ryan Blaney	Team Penske	Ford	47.038	47.125
13	78	Martin Truex Jr.	Furniture Row Racing	Toyota	47.069	—
14	42	Kyle Larson	Chip Ganassi Racing	Chevrolet	47.086	—
15	18	Kyle Busch	Joe Gibbs Racing	Toyota	47.142	—
16	62	Brendan Gaughan	Beard Motorsports	Chevrolet	47.145	—
17	11	Denny Hamlin	Joe Gibbs Racing	Toyota	47.151	—
18	24	William Byron (R)	Hendrick Motorsports	Chevrolet	47.153	—
19	13	Ty Dillon	Germain Racing	Chevrolet	47.162	—
20	6	Trevor Bayne	Roush Fenway Racing	Ford	47.165	—
21	38	David Ragan	Front Row Motorsports	Ford	47.211	—
22	43	Bubba Wallace (R)	Richard Petty Motorsports	Chevrolet	47.228	—
23	41	Kurt Busch	Stewart–Haas Racing	Ford	47.270	—
24	47	A. J. Allmendinger	JTG Daugherty Racing	Chevrolet	47.284	—
25	37	Chris Buescher	JTG Daugherty Racing	Chevrolet	47.358	—
26	10	Aric Almirola	Stewart–Haas Racing	Ford	47.360	—
27	1	Jamie McMurray	Chip Ganassi Racing	Chevrolet	47.424	—
28	95	Kasey Kahne	Leavine Family Racing	Chevrolet	47.456	—
29	20	Erik Jones	Joe Gibbs Racing	Toyota	47.510	—
30	21	Paul Menard	Wood Brothers Racing	Ford	47.568	—
31	32	Matt DiBenedetto	Go Fas Racing	Ford	47.787	—
32	19	Daniel Suárez	Joe Gibbs Racing	Toyota	47.872	—
33	15	Ross Chastain (i)	Premium Motorsports	Chevrolet	48.033	—
34	7	Jeffrey Earnhardt	Premium Motorsports	Chevrolet	48.045	—
35	96	D. J. Kennington	Gaunt Brothers Racing	Toyota	48.306	—
36	00	Joey Gase (i)	StarCom Racing	Chevrolet	48.554	—
37	99	Landon Cassill	StarCom Racing	Chevrolet	48.640	—
38	72	Corey LaJoie	TriStar Motorsports	Chevrolet	48.655	—
39	51	Ray Black Jr. (i)	Rick Ware Racing	Chevrolet	49.141	—
40	23	J. J. Yeley (i)	BK Racing	Toyota	49.253	—
Did not qualify
41	92	Timothy Peters (i)	RBR Enterprises	Ford	49.705	—
Official qualifying results

== Race results ==
=== Stage results ===
Stage 1 Laps: 40

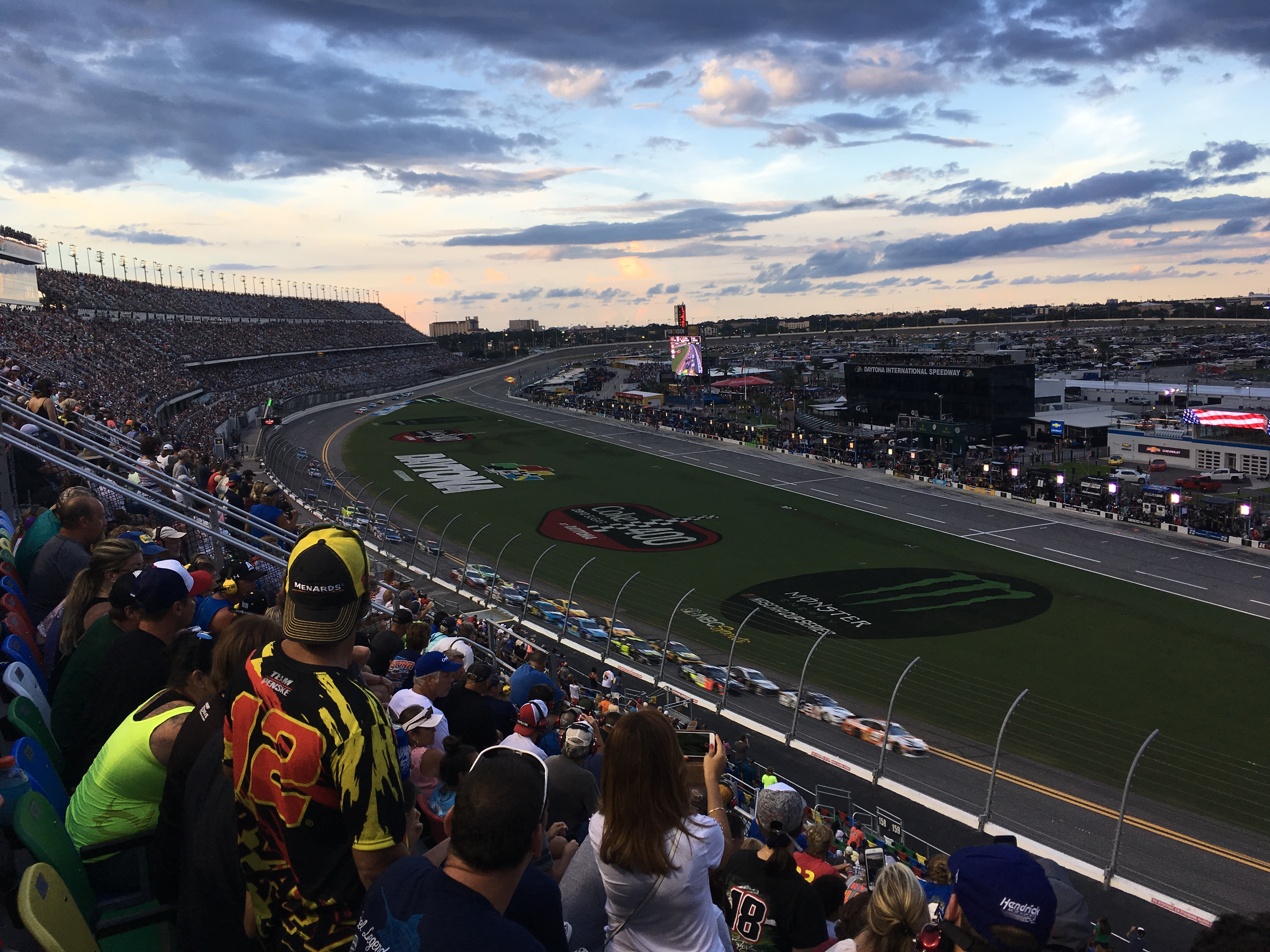
Polesitter Chase Elliott leads early in the race

Pos	No	Driver	Team	Manufacturer	Points
1	17	Ricky Stenhouse Jr.	Roush Fenway Racing	Ford	10
2	18	Kyle Busch	Joe Gibbs Racing	Toyota	9
3	42	Kyle Larson	Chip Ganassi Racing	Chevrolet	8
4	24	William Byron (R)	Hendrick Motorsports	Chevrolet	7
5	9	Chase Elliott	Hendrick Motorsports	Chevrolet	6
6	41	Kurt Busch	Stewart–Haas Racing	Ford	5
7	31	Ryan Newman	Richard Childress Racing	Chevrolet	4
8	2	Brad Keselowski	Team Penske	Ford	3
9	3	Austin Dillon	Richard Childress Racing	Chevrolet	2
10	88	Alex Bowman	Hendrick Motorsports	Chevrolet	1
Official stage one results

Stage 2 Laps: 40

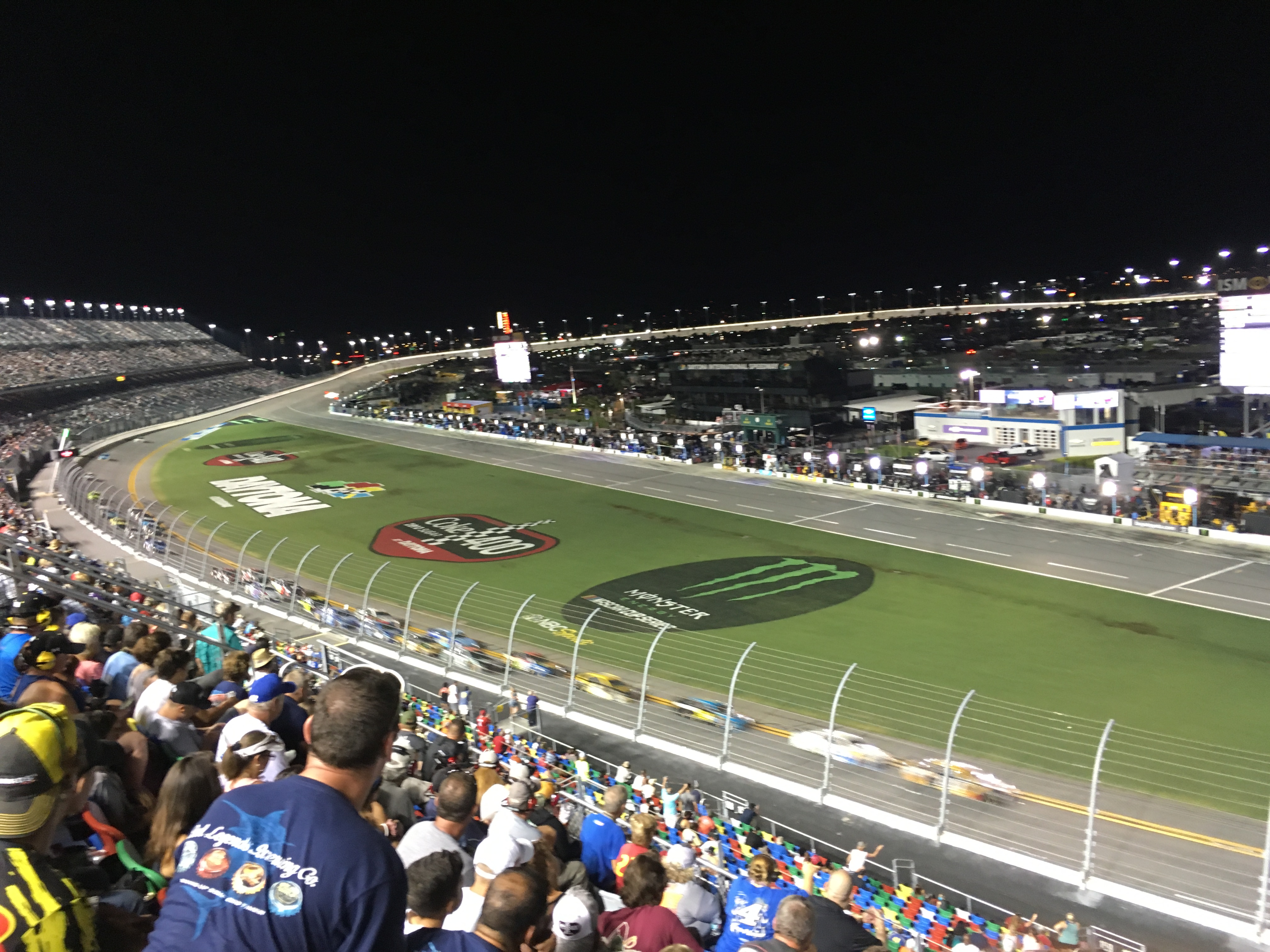
Clint Bowyer leads during the final stage of the race

Pos	No	Driver	Team	Manufacturer	Points
1	17	Ricky Stenhouse Jr.	Roush Fenway Racing	Ford	10
2	34	Michael McDowell	Front Row Motorsports	Ford	9
3	88	Alex Bowman	Hendrick Motorsports	Chevrolet	8
4	95	Kasey Kahne	Leavine Family Racing	Chevrolet	7
5	13	Ty Dillon	Germain Racing	Chevrolet	6
6	48	Jimmie Johnson	Hendrick Motorsports	Chevrolet	5
7	42	Kyle Larson	Chip Ganassi Racing	Chevrolet	4
8	3	Austin Dillon	Richard Childress Racing	Chevrolet	3
9	6	Trevor Bayne	Roush Fenway Racing	Ford	2
10	31	Ryan Newman	Richard Childress Racing	Chevrolet	1
Official stage two results

=== Final stage results ===
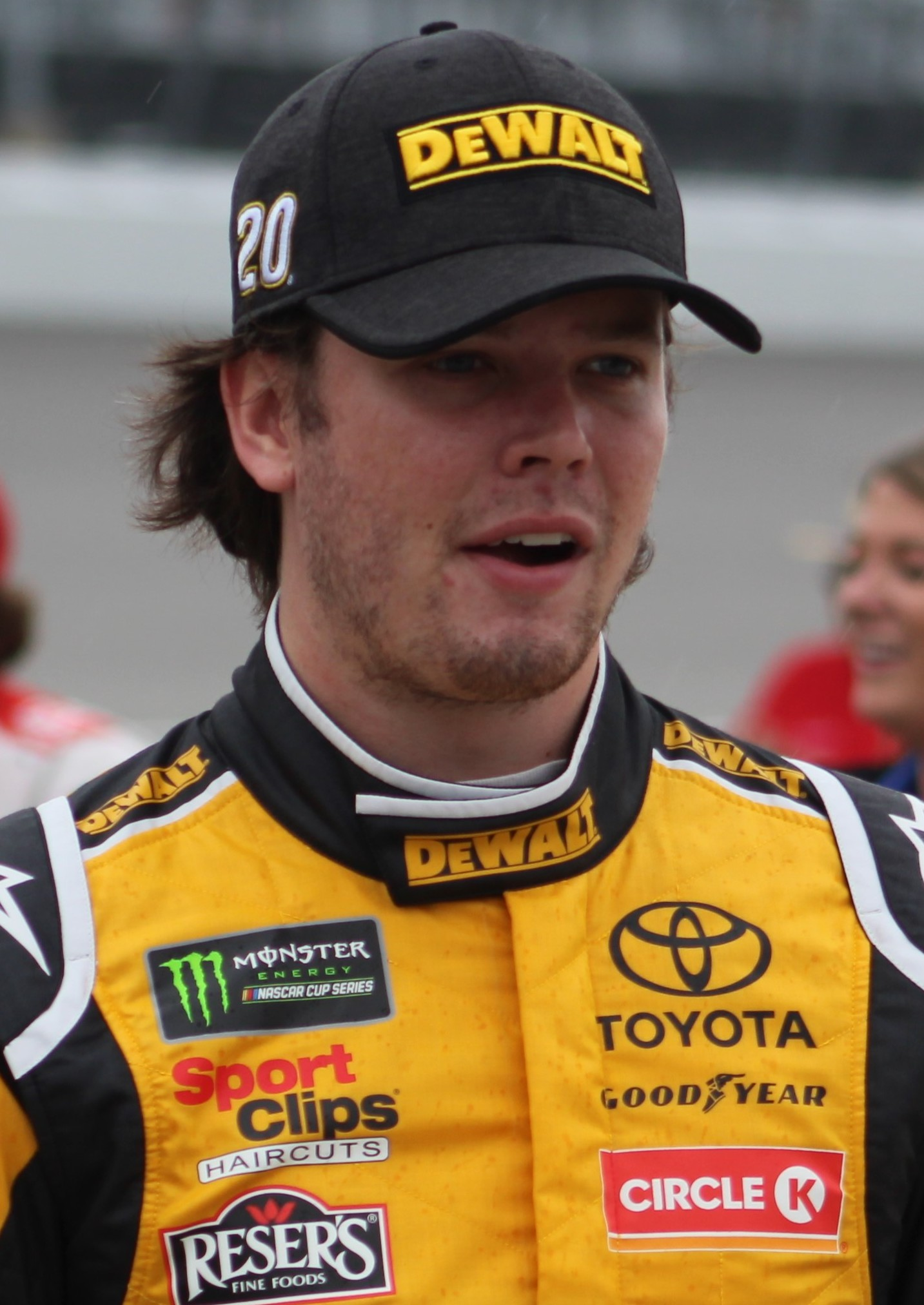
Erik Jones scored his first career Cup Series win.

Stage 3 Laps: 80

Pos	Grid	No	Driver	Team	Manufacturer	Laps	Points
1	29	20	Erik Jones	Joe Gibbs Racing	Toyota	168	40
2	13	78	Martin Truex Jr.	Furniture Row Racing	Toyota	168	35
3	24	47	A. J. Allmendinger	JTG Daugherty Racing	Chevrolet	168	34
4	28	95	Kasey Kahne	Leavine Family Racing	Chevrolet	168	40
5	25	37	Chris Buescher	JTG Daugherty Racing	Chevrolet	168	32
6	19	13	Ty Dillon	Germain Racing	Chevrolet	168	37
7	31	32	Matt DiBenedetto	Go Fas Racing	Ford	168	30
8	7	31	Ryan Newman	Richard Childress Racing	Chevrolet	168	34
9	10	3	Austin Dillon	Richard Childress Racing	Chevrolet	168	33
10	2	88	Alex Bowman	Hendrick Motorsports	Chevrolet	168	36
11	34	7	Jeffrey Earnhardt	Premium Motorsports	Chevrolet	168	26
12	16	62	Brendan Gaughan	Beard Motorsports	Chevrolet	168	25
13	35	96	D. J. Kennington	Gaunt Brothers Racing	Toyota	168	24
14	22	43	Bubba Wallace (R)	Richard Petty Motorsports	Chevrolet	167	23
15	21	38	David Ragan	Front Row Motorsports	Ford	167	22
16	39	51	Ray Black Jr. (i)	Rick Ware Racing	Chevrolet	167	0
17	6	17	Ricky Stenhouse Jr.	Roush Fenway Racing	Ford	167	40
18	40	23	J. J. Yeley (i)	BK Racing	Toyota	166	0
19	5	4	Kevin Harvick	Stewart–Haas Racing	Ford	162	18
20	20	6	Trevor Bayne	Roush Fenway Racing	Ford	162	19
21	33	15	Ross Chastain (i)	Premium Motorsports	Chevrolet	162	0
22	9	14	Clint Bowyer	Stewart–Haas Racing	Ford	162	15
23	4	48	Jimmie Johnson	Hendrick Motorsports	Chevrolet	162	19
24	37	99	Landon Cassill	StarCom Racing	Chevrolet	162	13
25	36	00	Joey Gase (i)	StarCom Racing	Chevrolet	161	0
26	8	34	Michael McDowell	Front Row Motorsports	Ford	155	20
27	26	10	Aric Almirola	Stewart–Haas Racing	Ford	155	10
28	30	21	Paul Menard	Wood Brothers Racing	Ford	152	9
29	14	42	Kyle Larson	Chip Ganassi Racing	Chevrolet	123	20
30	27	1	Jamie McMurray	Chip Ganassi Racing	Chevrolet	68	7
31	38	72	Corey LaJoie	TriStar Motorsports	Chevrolet	65	6
32	18	24	William Byron (R)	Hendrick Motorsports	Chevrolet	64	12
33	15	18	Kyle Busch	Joe Gibbs Racing	Toyota	64	13
34	1	9	Chase Elliott	Hendrick Motorsports	Chevrolet	54	9
35	32	19	Daniel Suárez	Joe Gibbs Racing	Toyota	54	2
36	3	2	Brad Keselowski	Team Penske	Ford	53	4
37	23	41	Kurt Busch	Stewart–Haas Racing	Ford	53	6
38	17	11	Denny Hamlin	Joe Gibbs Racing	Toyota	53	1
39	11	22	Joey Logano	Team Penske	Ford	53	1
40	12	12	Ryan Blaney	Team Penske	Ford	53	1
Official race results

=== Race statistics ===
- Lead changes: 25 among 16 different drivers
- Cautions/Laps: 10 for 46 laps
- Red flags: 1 for 5 minutes and 1 second
- Time of race: 3 hours, 13 minutes and 12 seconds
- Average speed: 130.435 miles per hour (209.915 km/h)

== Media ==
=== Television ===
NBC Sports covered the race on the television side. Rick Allen, 2000 Coke Zero 400 winner Jeff Burton and two-time Coke Zero 400 winner Dale Earnhardt Jr. called the race from the broadcast booth, while Mike Tirico and Steve Letarte called from the NBC Peacock Pit Box on pit road. Dave Burns, Parker Kligerman, Marty Snider and Kelli Stavast reported from pit lane.

NBC
Booth announcers	Pit reporters
Lap-by-lap: Rick Allen; Color commentator: Jeff Burton; Color commentator: Dale Earnhardt Jr. NBC Peacock Pitbox: Mike Tirico; NBC Peacock Pitbox: Steve Letarte	Dave Burns; Parker Kligerman; Marty Snider; Kelli Stavast

=== Radio ===
MRN had the radio call for the race which was also simulcast on SiriusXM's NASCAR Radio channel.

MRN Radio
Booth announcers	Turn announcers	Pit reporters
Lead announcer: Joe Moore; Announcer: Jeff Striegle; Announcer: Rusty Wallace	Turns 1 & 2: Dave Moody; Backstretch: Mike Bagley; Turns 3 & 4: Kurt Becker	Alex Hayden; Winston Kelley; Kim Coon; Steve Post

== Standings after the race ==
Drivers' Championship standings

	Pos	Driver	Points
	1	Kyle Busch	749
	2	Kevin Harvick	692 (–57)
1	3	Martin Truex Jr.	629 (–120)
1	4	Joey Logano	618 (–131)
	5	Brad Keselowski	596 (–153)
	6	Clint Bowyer	594 (–155)
	7	Kurt Busch	566 (–183)
1	8	Kyle Larson	544 (–205)
1	9	Denny Hamlin	538 (–211)
1	10	Aric Almirola	503 (–246)
1	11	Ryan Blaney	496 (–253)
	12	Jimmie Johnson	461 (–288)
1	13	Erik Jones	448 (–301)
1	14	Chase Elliott	444 (–305)
	15	Alex Bowman	426 (–323)
	16	Ricky Stenhouse Jr.	407 (–342)
Official driver's standings

Manufacturers' Championship standings

Pos	Manufacturer	Points
1	Toyota	660
2	Ford	644 (–16)
3	Chevrolet	581 (–79)
Official manufacturers' standings

- Note: Only the first 16 positions are included for the driver standings.
- . – Driver has clinched a position in the Monster Energy NASCAR Cup Series playoffs.

Previous race: 2018 Overton's 400	Monster Energy NASCAR Cup Series; 2018 season	Next race: 2018 Quaker State 400
