= 2018 FireKeepers Casino 400 =

Race details
- Race 15 of 36 in the 2018 Monster Energy NASCAR Cup Series
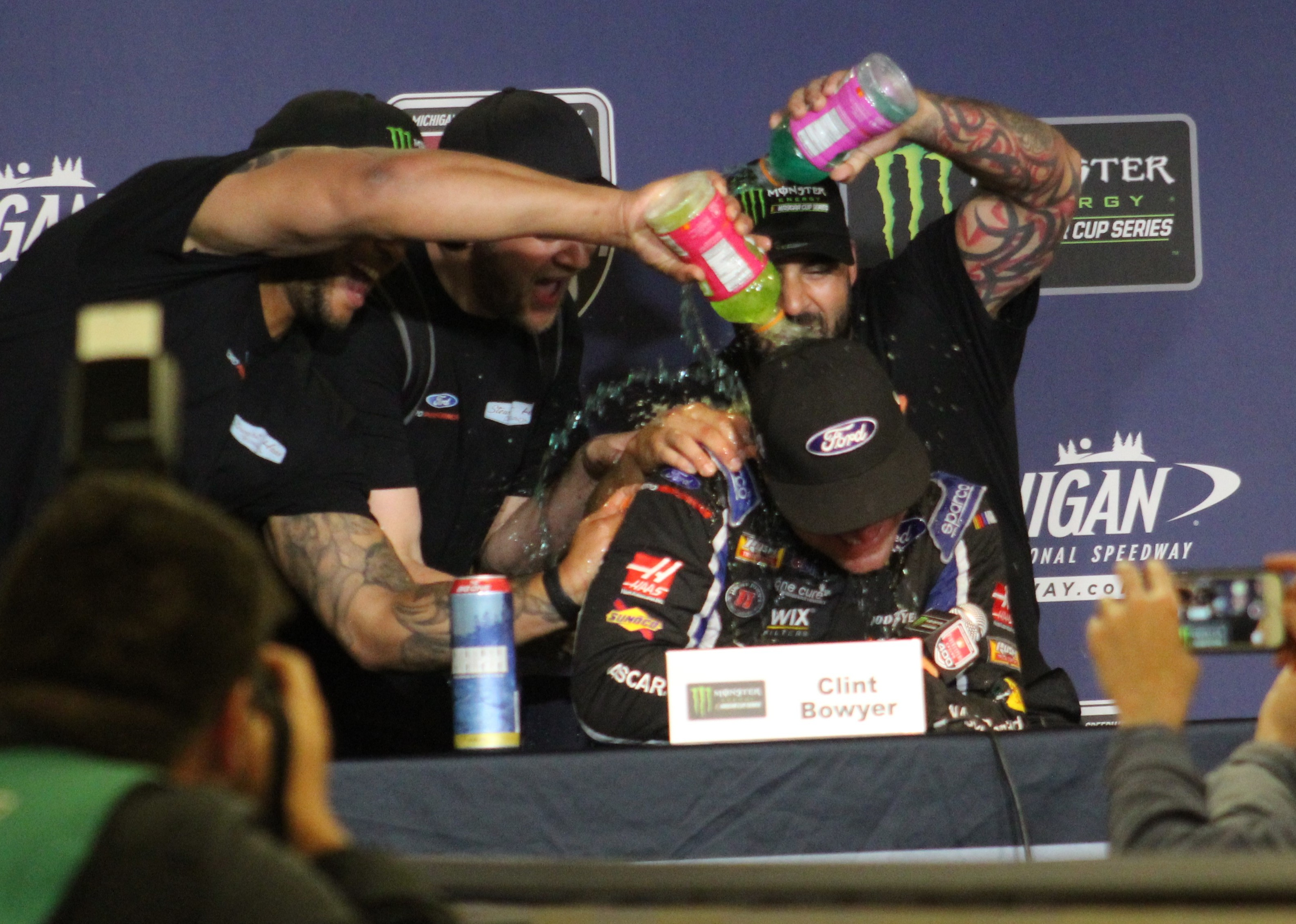
- Date: June 10, 2018
- Location: Michigan International Speedway in Cambridge Township, Michigan
- Course: Permanent racing facility
- Course length: 2.0 miles (3.219 km)
- Distance: 133 laps, 266 mi (428.086 km)
- Scheduled distance: 200 laps, 400 mi (643.738 km)
- Average speed: 132.723 miles per hour (213.597 km/h)

Pole position
Driver	Kurt Busch	Stewart–Haas Racing
- Time: 35.405

Most laps led
Driver	Kevin Harvick	Stewart–Haas Racing
- Laps: 49

Winner
No. 14	Clint Bowyer	Stewart–Haas Racing

Television in the United States
- Network: FOX
- Announcers: Mike Joy, Jeff Gordon and Darrell Waltrip
- Nielsen ratings: 2.2 (Overnight)

Radio in the United States
- Radio: MRN
- Booth announcers: Joe Moore, Jeff Striegle and Rusty Wallace
- Turn announcers: Dave Moody (1–2) and Buddy Long (3–4)

The 2018 FireKeepers Casino 400 was a Monster Energy NASCAR Cup Series race held on June 10, 2018 at Michigan International Speedway in Cambridge Township, Michigan. The 15th race of the 2018 Monster Energy NASCAR Cup Series season, it was scheduled for 200 laps of the 2-mile (3.2-kilometre) D-shaped oval, but was shortened to 133 laps due to rain.

Clint Bowyer took his second victory of the season and his tenth win overall.

== Report ==
=== Background ===
Layout of Michigan International Speedway, the track where the race was held.

The race was held at Michigan International Speedway, a 2-mile (3.2-kilometre) moderate-banked D-shaped speedway located in Cambridge Township, Michigan. The track is used primarily for NASCAR events. It is sometimes known as a "sister track" to Texas World Speedway, and was used as the basis of Auto Club Speedway. The track is owned by NASCAR. Michigan International Speedway is recognized as one of motorsports' premier facilities because of its wide racing surface and high banking (by open-wheel standards; the 18-degree banking is modest by stock car standards).

==== Entry list ====
No.	Driver	Team	Manufacturer
00	Landon Cassill	StarCom Racing	Chevrolet
1	Jamie McMurray	Chip Ganassi Racing	Chevrolet
2	Brad Keselowski	Team Penske	Ford
3	Austin Dillon	Richard Childress Racing	Chevrolet
4	Kevin Harvick	Stewart–Haas Racing	Ford
6	Matt Kenseth	Roush Fenway Racing	Ford
7	D. J. Kennington	Premium Motorsports	Chevrolet
9	Chase Elliott	Hendrick Motorsports	Chevrolet
10	Aric Almirola	Stewart–Haas Racing	Ford
11	Denny Hamlin	Joe Gibbs Racing	Toyota
12	Ryan Blaney	Team Penske	Ford
13	Ty Dillon	Germain Racing	Chevrolet
14	Clint Bowyer	Stewart–Haas Racing	Ford
15	Ross Chastain (i)	Premium Motorsports	Chevrolet
17	Ricky Stenhouse Jr.	Roush Fenway Racing	Ford
18	Kyle Busch	Joe Gibbs Racing	Toyota
19	Daniel Suárez	Joe Gibbs Racing	Toyota
20	Erik Jones	Joe Gibbs Racing	Toyota
21	Paul Menard	Wood Brothers Racing	Ford
22	Joey Logano	Team Penske	Ford
23	Gray Gaulding	BK Racing	Toyota
24	William Byron (R)	Hendrick Motorsports	Chevrolet
31	Ryan Newman	Richard Childress Racing	Chevrolet
32	Matt DiBenedetto	Go Fas Racing	Ford
34	Michael McDowell	Front Row Motorsports	Ford
37	Chris Buescher	JTG Daugherty Racing	Chevrolet
38	David Ragan	Front Row Motorsports	Ford
41	Kurt Busch	Stewart–Haas Racing	Ford
42	Kyle Larson	Chip Ganassi Racing	Chevrolet
43	Bubba Wallace (R)	Richard Petty Motorsports	Chevrolet
47	A. J. Allmendinger	JTG Daugherty Racing	Chevrolet
48	Jimmie Johnson	Hendrick Motorsports	Chevrolet
51	B. J. McLeod (i)	Rick Ware Racing	Chevrolet
66	Timmy Hill (i)	MBM Motorsports	Toyota
72	Corey LaJoie	TriStar Motorsports	Chevrolet
78	Martin Truex Jr.	Furniture Row Racing	Toyota
88	Alex Bowman	Hendrick Motorsports	Chevrolet
95	Kasey Kahne	Leavine Family Racing	Chevrolet
99	Garrett Smithley (i)	StarCom Racing	Chevrolet
Official entry list

== First practice ==
Ryan Blaney was the fastest in the first practice session with a time of 35.535 seconds and a speed of 202.617 mph (326.080 km/h).

Pos	No.	Driver	Team	Manufacturer	Time	Speed
1	12	Ryan Blaney	Team Penske	Ford	35.535	202.617
2	18	Kyle Busch	Joe Gibbs Racing	Toyota	35.655	201.935
3	2	Brad Keselowski	Team Penske	Ford	35.667	201.867
Official first practice results

== Qualifying ==
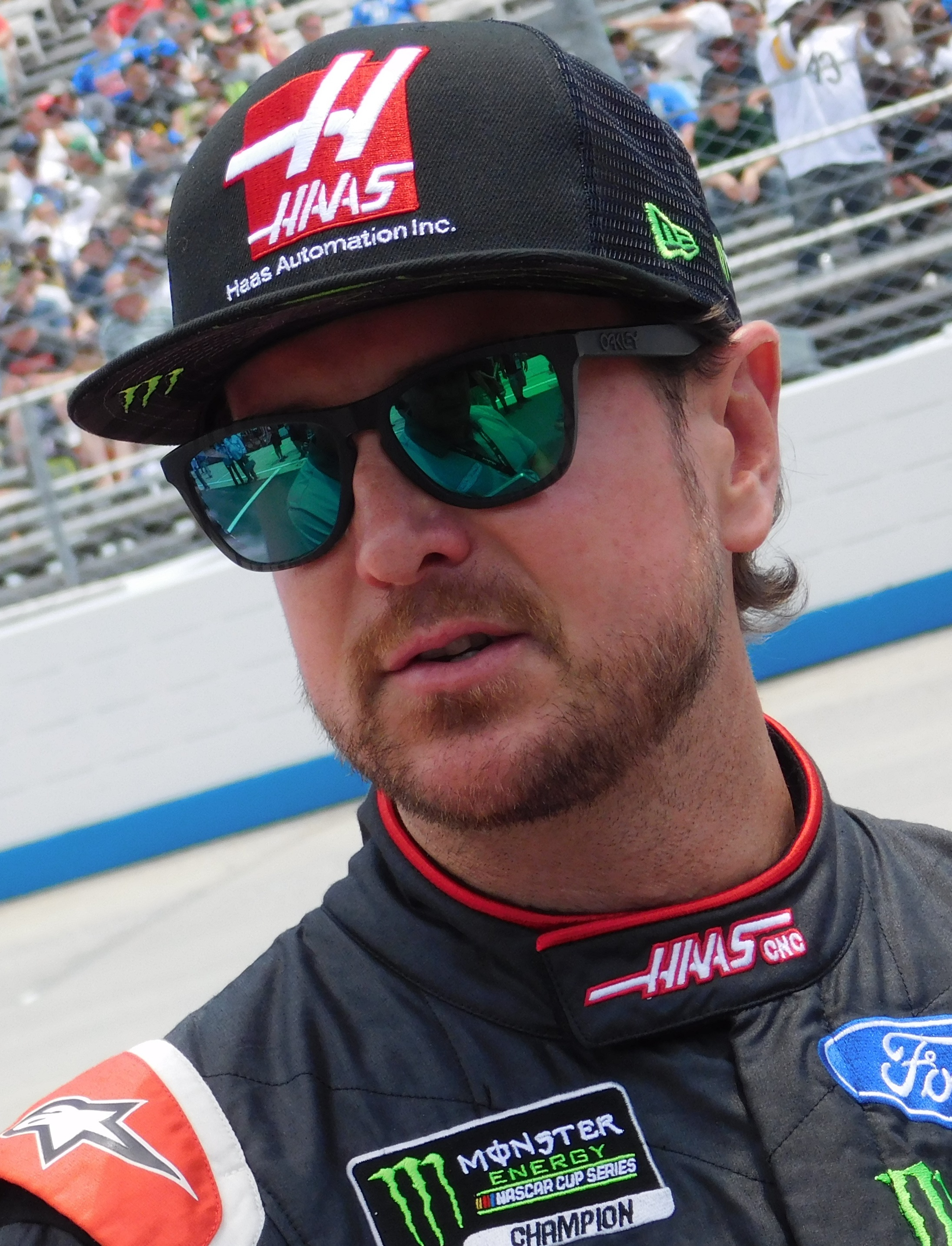
Kurt Busch scored the pole position.

Kurt Busch scored the pole for the race with a time of 35.405 and a speed of 203.361 mph (327.278 km/h).

=== Qualifying results ===
Pos	No.	Driver	Team	Manufacturer	R1	R2	R3
1	41	Kurt Busch	Stewart–Haas Racing	Ford	35.958	35.686	35.405
2	2	Brad Keselowski	Team Penske	Ford	35.739	35.692	35.439
3	18	Kyle Busch	Joe Gibbs Racing	Toyota	36.135	35.635	35.447
4	4	Kevin Harvick	Stewart–Haas Racing	Ford	35.503	35.452	35.476
5	22	Joey Logano	Team Penske	Ford	35.786	35.701	35.614
6	10	Aric Almirola	Stewart–Haas Racing	Ford	35.888	35.896	35.713
7	17	Ricky Stenhouse Jr.	Roush Fenway Racing	Ford	35.969	35.877	35.774
8	20	Erik Jones	Joe Gibbs Racing	Toyota	36.058	35.877	35.796
9	12	Ryan Blaney	Team Penske	Ford	35.662	35.647	35.858
10	11	Denny Hamlin	Joe Gibbs Racing	Toyota	36.009	35.801	35.928
11	31	Ryan Newman	Richard Childress Racing	Chevrolet	35.914	35.848	35.989
12	14	Clint Bowyer	Stewart–Haas Racing	Ford	36.041	35.826	36.039
13	9	Chase Elliott	Hendrick Motorsports	Chevrolet	35.987	35.904	—
14	24	William Byron (R)	Hendrick Motorsports	Chevrolet	36.114	35.912	—
15	21	Paul Menard	Wood Brothers Racing	Ford	35.802	35.941	—
16	3	Austin Dillon	Richard Childress Racing	Chevrolet	35.994	35.942	—
17	78	Martin Truex Jr.	Furniture Row Racing	Toyota	36.097	35.959	—
18	37	Chris Buescher	JTG Daugherty Racing	Chevrolet	36.082	35.985	—
19	6	Matt Kenseth	Roush Fenway Racing	Ford	36.049	36.035	—
20	48	Jimmie Johnson	Hendrick Motorsports	Chevrolet	36.044	36.039	—
21	88	Alex Bowman	Hendrick Motorsports	Chevrolet	35.877	36.054	—
22	19	Daniel Suárez	Joe Gibbs Racing	Toyota	36.154	36.064	—
23	34	Michael McDowell	Front Row Motorsports	Ford	36.129	36.116	—
24	1	Jamie McMurray	Chip Ganassi Racing	Chevrolet	36.127	36.126	—
25	47	A. J. Allmendinger	JTG Daugherty Racing	Chevrolet	36.172	—	—
26	42	Kyle Larson	Chip Ganassi Racing	Chevrolet	36.181	—	—
27	38	David Ragan	Front Row Motorsports	Ford	36.228	—	—
28	43	Bubba Wallace (R)	Richard Petty Motorsports	Chevrolet	36.262	—	—
29	95	Kasey Kahne	Leavine Family Racing	Chevrolet	36.372	—	—
30	32	Matt DiBenedetto	Go Fas Racing	Ford	36.418	—	—
31	13	Ty Dillon	Germain Racing	Chevrolet	36.564	—	—
32	72	Corey LaJoie	TriStar Motorsports	Chevrolet	37.030	—	—
33	15	Ross Chastain (i)	Premium Motorsports	Chevrolet	37.081	—	—
34	23	Gray Gaulding	BK Racing	Toyota	37.374	—	—
35	51	B. J. McLeod (i)	Rick Ware Racing	Chevrolet	37.484	—	—
36	00	Landon Cassill	StarCom Racing	Chevrolet	37.765	—	—
37	7	D. J. Kennington	Premium Motorsports	Chevrolet	38.319	—	—
38	66	Timmy Hill (i)	MBM Motorsports	Toyota	38.617	—	—
39	99	Garrett Smithley (i)	StarCom Racing	Chevrolet	38.618	—	—
Official qualifying results

== Practice (post-qualifying) ==
=== Second practice ===
Kevin Harvick was the fastest in the second practice session with a time of 35.871 seconds and a speed of 200.719 mph (323.026 km/h).

Pos	No.	Driver	Team	Manufacturer	Time	Speed
1	4	Kevin Harvick	Stewart–Haas Racing	Ford	35.871	200.719
2	42	Kyle Larson	Chip Ganassi Racing	Chevrolet	35.985	200.083
3	22	Joey Logano	Team Penske	Ford	36.036	199.800
Official second practice results

=== Final practice ===
Final practice session for Saturday was cancelled due to rain.

== Race ==
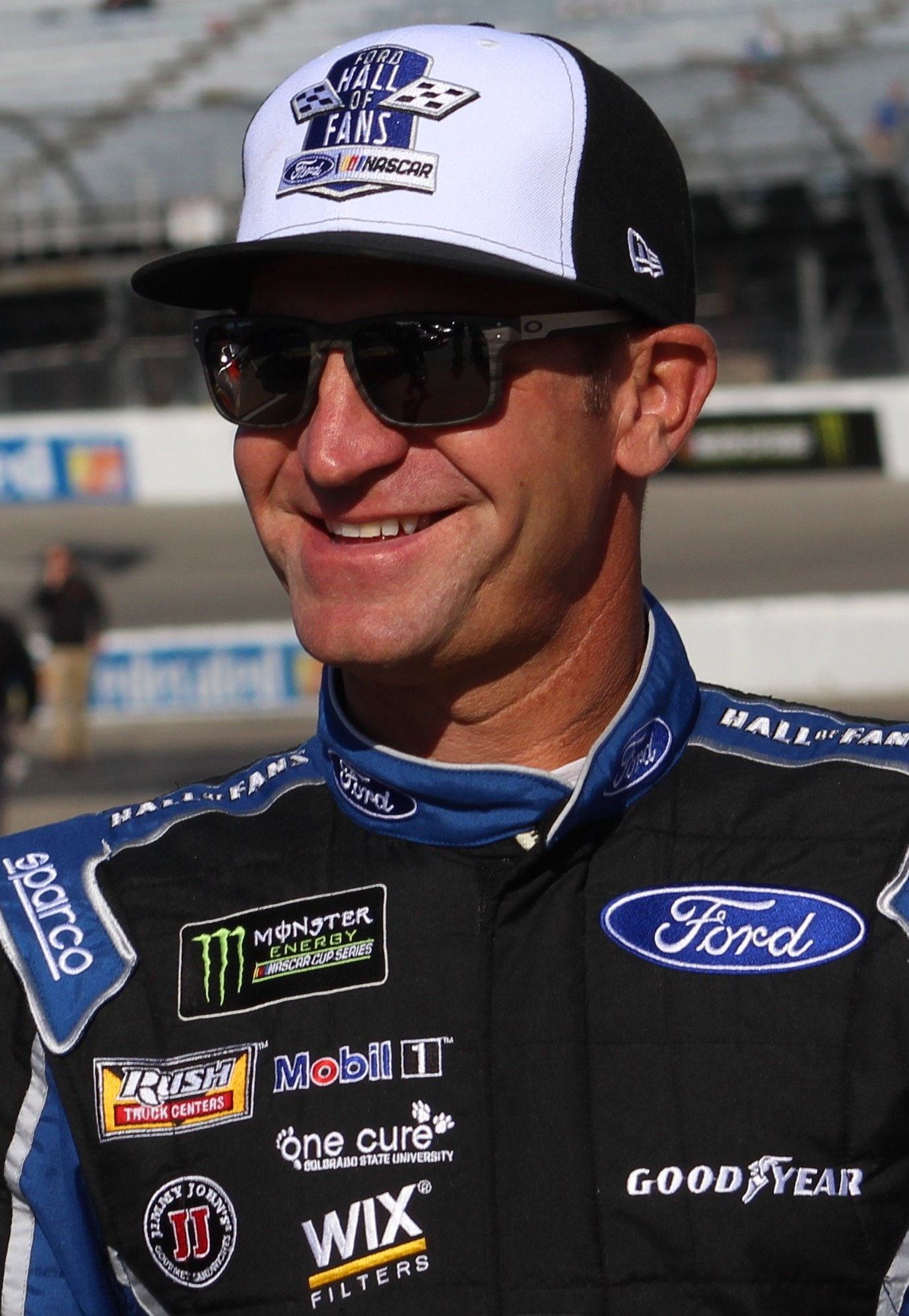
Clint Bowyer was declared the winner after rain shortened the race to 133 laps.

=== Stage results ===
Stage 1 Laps: 60

Pos	No	Driver	Team	Manufacturer	Points
1	12	Ryan Blaney	Team Penske	Ford	10
2	42	Kyle Larson	Chip Ganassi Racing	Chevrolet	9
3	14	Clint Bowyer	Stewart–Haas Racing	Ford	8
4	4	Kevin Harvick	Stewart–Haas Racing	Ford	7
5	11	Denny Hamlin	Joe Gibbs Racing	Toyota	6
6	2	Brad Keselowski	Team Penske	Ford	5
7	41	Kurt Busch	Stewart–Haas Racing	Ford	4
8	24	William Byron (R)	Hendrick Motorsports	Chevrolet	3
9	22	Joey Logano	Team Penske	Ford	2
10	10	Aric Almirola	Stewart–Haas Racing	Ford	1
Official stage one results

Stage 2 Laps: 60

Pos	No	Driver	Team	Manufacturer	Points
1	4	Kevin Harvick	Stewart–Haas Racing	Ford	10
2	14	Clint Bowyer	Stewart–Haas Racing	Ford	9
3	41	Kurt Busch	Stewart–Haas Racing	Ford	8
4	18	Kyle Busch	Joe Gibbs Racing	Toyota	7
5	21	Paul Menard	Wood Brothers Racing	Ford	6
6	12	Ryan Blaney	Team Penske	Ford	5
7	2	Brad Keselowski	Team Penske	Ford	4
8	1	Jamie McMurray	Chip Ganassi Racing	Chevrolet	3
9	20	Erik Jones	Joe Gibbs Racing	Toyota	2
10	24	William Byron (R)	Hendrick Motorsports	Chevrolet	1
Official stage two results

=== Final stage results ===
Stage 3 Laps: 80

Pos	Grid	No	Driver	Team	Manufacturer	Laps	Points
1	12	14	Clint Bowyer	Stewart–Haas Racing	Ford	133	57
2	4	4	Kevin Harvick	Stewart–Haas Racing	Ford	133	52
3	1	41	Kurt Busch	Stewart–Haas Racing	Ford	133	46
4	3	18	Kyle Busch	Joe Gibbs Racing	Toyota	133	40
5	15	21	Paul Menard	Wood Brothers Racing	Ford	133	38
6	2	2	Brad Keselowski	Team Penske	Ford	133	40
7	5	22	Joey Logano	Team Penske	Ford	133	38
8	9	12	Ryan Blaney	Team Penske	Ford	133	44
9	13	9	Chase Elliott	Hendrick Motorsports	Chevrolet	133	28
10	24	1	Jamie McMurray	Chip Ganassi Racing	Chevrolet	133	30
11	6	10	Aric Almirola	Stewart–Haas Racing	Ford	133	27
12	10	11	Denny Hamlin	Joe Gibbs Racing	Toyota	133	31
13	14	24	William Byron (R)	Hendrick Motorsports	Chevrolet	133	28
14	16	3	Austin Dillon	Richard Childress Racing	Chevrolet	133	23
15	8	20	Erik Jones	Joe Gibbs Racing	Toyota	133	24
16	21	88	Alex Bowman	Hendrick Motorsports	Chevrolet	133	21
17	25	47	A. J. Allmendinger	JTG Daugherty Racing	Chevrolet	133	20
18	17	78	Martin Truex Jr.	Furniture Row Racing	Toyota	133	19
19	28	43	Bubba Wallace (R)	Richard Petty Motorsports	Chevrolet	133	18
20	20	48	Jimmie Johnson	Hendrick Motorsports	Chevrolet	133	17
21	31	13	Ty Dillon	Germain Racing	Chevrolet	133	16
22	11	31	Ryan Newman	Richard Childress Racing	Chevrolet	133	15
23	29	95	Kasey Kahne	Leavine Family Racing	Chevrolet	133	14
24	18	37	Chris Buescher	JTG Daugherty Racing	Chevrolet	133	13
25	23	34	Michael McDowell	Front Row Motorsports	Ford	133	12
26	33	15	Ross Chastain (i)	Premium Motorsports	Chevrolet	133	0
27	32	72	Corey LaJoie	TriStar Motorsports	Chevrolet	133	10
28	26	42	Kyle Larson	Chip Ganassi Racing	Chevrolet	133	18
29	7	17	Ricky Stenhouse Jr.	Roush Fenway Racing	Ford	133	8
30	22	19	Daniel Suárez	Joe Gibbs Racing	Toyota	132	7
31	34	23	Gray Gaulding	BK Racing	Toyota	132	6
32	36	00	Landon Cassill	StarCom Racing	Chevrolet	132	5
33	19	6	Matt Kenseth	Roush Fenway Racing	Ford	132	4
34	37	7	D. J. Kennington	Premium Motorsports	Chevrolet	132	3
35	38	66	Timmy Hill (i)	MBM Motorsports	Toyota	132	0
36	30	32	Matt DiBenedetto	Go Fas Racing	Ford	131	1
37	35	51	B. J. McLeod (i)	Rick Ware Racing	Chevrolet	131	0
38	27	38	David Ragan	Front Row Motorsports	Ford	35	1
39	39	99	Garrett Smithley (i)	StarCom Racing	Chevrolet	1	0
Official race results

=== Race statistics ===
- Lead changes: 9 among 7 different drivers
- Cautions/Laps: 8 for 30 laps
- Red flags: 1
- Time of race: 2 hours, 15 seconds
- Average speed: 132.723 miles per hour (213.597 km/h)

== Media ==
=== Television ===
Fox NASCAR televised the race in the United States on FOX for the seventh time at Michigan. Mike Joy was the lap-by-lap announcer, while three-time Michigan winner Jeff Gordon and two-time Michigan winner Darrell Waltrip were the color commentators. Jamie Little, Regan Smith and Matt Yocum reported from pit lane during the race.

FOX Television
Booth announcers	Pit reporters
Lap-by-lap: Mike Joy; Color commentator: Jeff Gordon; Color commentator: Darrell Waltrip	Jamie Little; Regan Smith; Matt Yocum

=== Radio ===
Radio coverage of the race was broadcast by Motor Racing Network (MRN) and simulcasted on SiriusXM's NASCAR Radio channel. Joe Moore, Jeff Striegle and five-time Michigan winner Rusty Wallace announced the race in the booth while the field was racing on the frontstretch. Dave Moody called the race from a billboard outside of turn 2 when the field was racing through turns 1 and 2, and Mike Bagley called the race from a platform outside of turn 3 when the field was racing through turns 3 and 4. Alex Hayden, Winston Kelley and Steve Post reported from pit lane during the race.

MRN
Booth announcers	Turn announcers	Pit reporters
Lead announcer: Joe Moore; Announcer: Jeff Striegle; Announcer: Rusty Wallace	Turns 1 & 2: Dave Moody; Turns 3 & 4: Buddy Long	Alex Hayden; Winston Kelley; Steve Post

== Standings after the race ==
Drivers' Championship standings

	Pos	Driver	Points
	1	Kyle Busch	664
	2	Kevin Harvick	589 (–75)
	3	Joey Logano	566 (–98)
1	4	Brad Keselowski	514 (–150)
1	5	Clint Bowyer	510 (–154)
2	6	Martin Truex Jr.	506 (–158)
	7	Kurt Busch	493 (–171)
	8	Denny Hamlin	468 (–196)
1	9	Ryan Blaney	457 (–207)
1	10	Kyle Larson	443 (–221)
	11	Aric Almirola	433 (–231)
	12	Jimmie Johnson	377 (–287)
	13	Chase Elliott	362 (–302)
	14	Erik Jones	346 (–318)
1	15	Alex Bowman	331 (–333)
1	16	Ricky Stenhouse Jr.	327 (–337)
Official driver's standings

Manufacturers' Championship standings

	Pos	Manufacturer	Points
1	1	Ford	545
1	2	Toyota	540 (–5)
	3	Chevrolet	479 (–66)
Official manufacturers' standings

- Note: Only the first 16 positions are included for the driver standings.
- . – Driver has clinched a position in the Monster Energy NASCAR Cup Series playoffs.

Previous race: 2018 Pocono 400	Monster Energy NASCAR Cup Series; 2018 season	Next race: 2018 Toyota/Save Mart 350
