= 2018 Overton's 400 =

Race details
- Race 17 of 36 in the 2018 Monster Energy NASCAR Cup Series
- The 2018 Overton's 400 program cover, featuring Martin Truex Jr.
- Date: July 1, 2018
- Location: Chicagoland Speedway in Joliet, Illinois
- Course: Permanent racing facility
- Course length: 1.5 miles (2.4 km)
- Distance: 267 laps, 400.5 mi (640.8 km)
- Average speed: 140.636 miles per hour (226.332 km/h)

Pole position
Driver	Paul Menard	Wood Brothers Racing
- Time: 29.998

Most laps led
Driver	Aric Almirola	Stewart–Haas Racing
- Laps: 70

Winner
No. 18	Kyle Busch	Joe Gibbs Racing

Television in the United States
- Network: NBCSN
- Announcers: Rick Allen, Jeff Burton, Steve Letarte and Dale Earnhardt Jr.
- Nielsen ratings: 1.6 (Overnight)

Radio in the United States
- Radio: MRN
- Booth announcers: Joe Moore, Jeff Striegle and Rusty Wallace
- Turn announcers: Dave Moody (1 & 2) and Mike Bagley (3 & 4)

The 2018 Overton's 400 was a Monster Energy NASCAR Cup Series race that was held on July 1, 2018 at Chicagoland Speedway in Joliet, Illinois. Contested over 267 laps on the 1.5-mile (2.4 km) intermediate speedway, it was the 17th race of the 2018 Monster Energy NASCAR Cup Series season.

== Report ==
=== Background ===
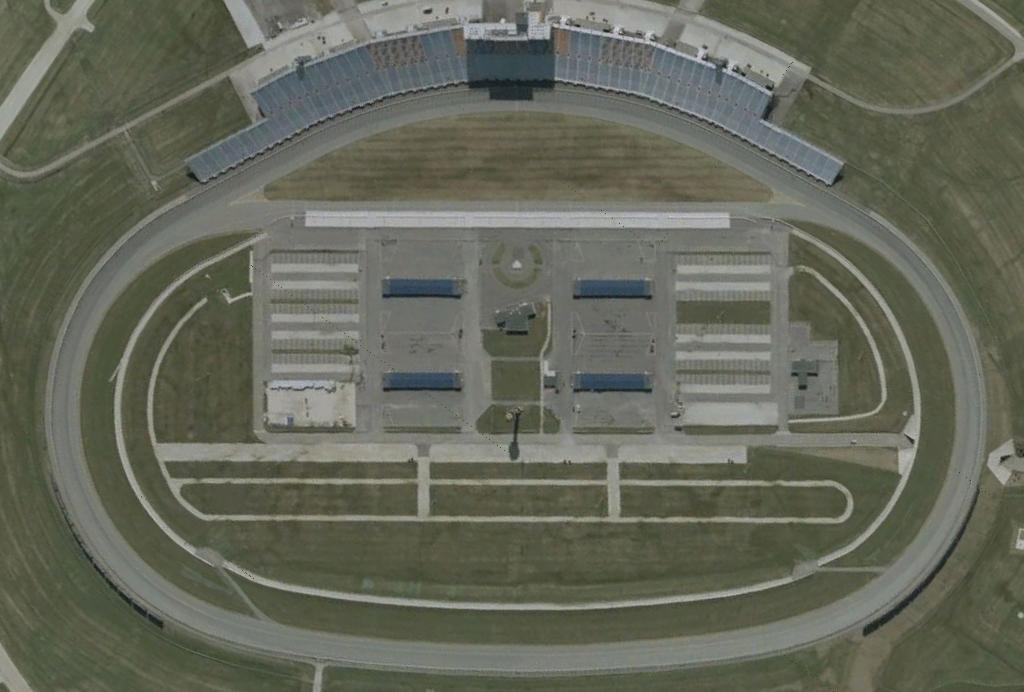
Chicagoland Speedway, the track where the race would be held.

Chicagoland Speedway is a 1.5 miles (2.4 km) tri-oval speedway in Joliet, Illinois, southwest of Chicago. The speedway opened in 2001 and currently hosts NASCAR racing. Until 2011, the speedway also hosted the IndyCar Series, recording numerous close finishes including the closest finish in IndyCar history. The speedway is owned and operated by International Speedway Corporation and located adjacent to Route 66 Raceway.

==== Entry list ====
No.	Driver	Team	Manufacturer
00	Landon Cassill	StarCom Racing	Chevrolet
1	Jamie McMurray	Chip Ganassi Racing	Chevrolet
2	Brad Keselowski	Team Penske	Ford
3	Austin Dillon	Richard Childress Racing	Chevrolet
4	Kevin Harvick	Stewart–Haas Racing	Ford
6	Trevor Bayne	Roush Fenway Racing	Ford
7	Reed Sorenson	Premium Motorsports	Chevrolet
9	Chase Elliott	Hendrick Motorsports	Chevrolet
10	Aric Almirola	Stewart–Haas Racing	Ford
11	Denny Hamlin	Joe Gibbs Racing	Toyota
12	Ryan Blaney	Team Penske	Ford
13	Ty Dillon	Germain Racing	Chevrolet
14	Clint Bowyer	Stewart–Haas Racing	Ford
15	Ross Chastain (i)	Premium Motorsports	Chevrolet
17	Ricky Stenhouse Jr.	Roush Fenway Racing	Ford
18	Kyle Busch	Joe Gibbs Racing	Toyota
19	Daniel Suárez	Joe Gibbs Racing	Toyota
20	Erik Jones	Joe Gibbs Racing	Toyota
21	Paul Menard	Wood Brothers Racing	Ford
22	Joey Logano	Team Penske	Ford
23	Gray Gaulding	BK Racing	Toyota
24	William Byron (R)	Hendrick Motorsports	Chevrolet
31	Ryan Newman	Richard Childress Racing	Chevrolet
32	Matt DiBenedetto	Go Fas Racing	Ford
34	Michael McDowell	Front Row Motorsports	Ford
37	Chris Buescher	JTG Daugherty Racing	Chevrolet
38	David Ragan	Front Row Motorsports	Ford
41	Kurt Busch	Stewart–Haas Racing	Ford
42	Kyle Larson	Chip Ganassi Racing	Chevrolet
43	Bubba Wallace (R)	Richard Petty Motorsports	Chevrolet
47	A. J. Allmendinger	JTG Daugherty Racing	Chevrolet
48	Jimmie Johnson	Hendrick Motorsports	Chevrolet
51	B. J. McLeod (i)	Rick Ware Racing	Chevrolet
66	Timmy Hill (i)	MBM Motorsports	Toyota
72	Corey LaJoie	TriStar Motorsports	Chevrolet
78	Martin Truex Jr.	Furniture Row Racing	Toyota
88	Alex Bowman	Hendrick Motorsports	Chevrolet
95	Kasey Kahne	Leavine Family Racing	Chevrolet
99	Kyle Weatherman	StarCom Racing	Chevrolet
Official entry list

== Practice ==
=== First practice ===
Ryan Blaney was the fastest in the first practice session with a time of 30.169 seconds and a speed of 178.992 mph (288.060 km/h).

Pos	No.	Driver	Team	Manufacturer	Time	Speed
1	12	Ryan Blaney	Team Penske	Ford	30.169	178.992
2	48	Jimmie Johnson	Hendrick Motorsports	Chevrolet	30.191	178.861
3	88	Alex Bowman	Hendrick Motorsports	Chevrolet	30.210	178.749
Official first practice results

=== Final practice ===
Brad Keselowski was the fastest in the final practice session with a time of 29.863 seconds and a speed of 180.826 mph (291.011 km/h).

Pos	No.	Driver	Team	Manufacturer	Time	Speed
1	2	Brad Keselowski	Team Penske	Ford	29.863	180.826
2	78	Martin Truex Jr.	Furniture Row Racing	Toyota	29.891	180.656
3	22	Joey Logano	Team Penske	Ford	29.952	180.288
Official final practice results

== Qualifying ==
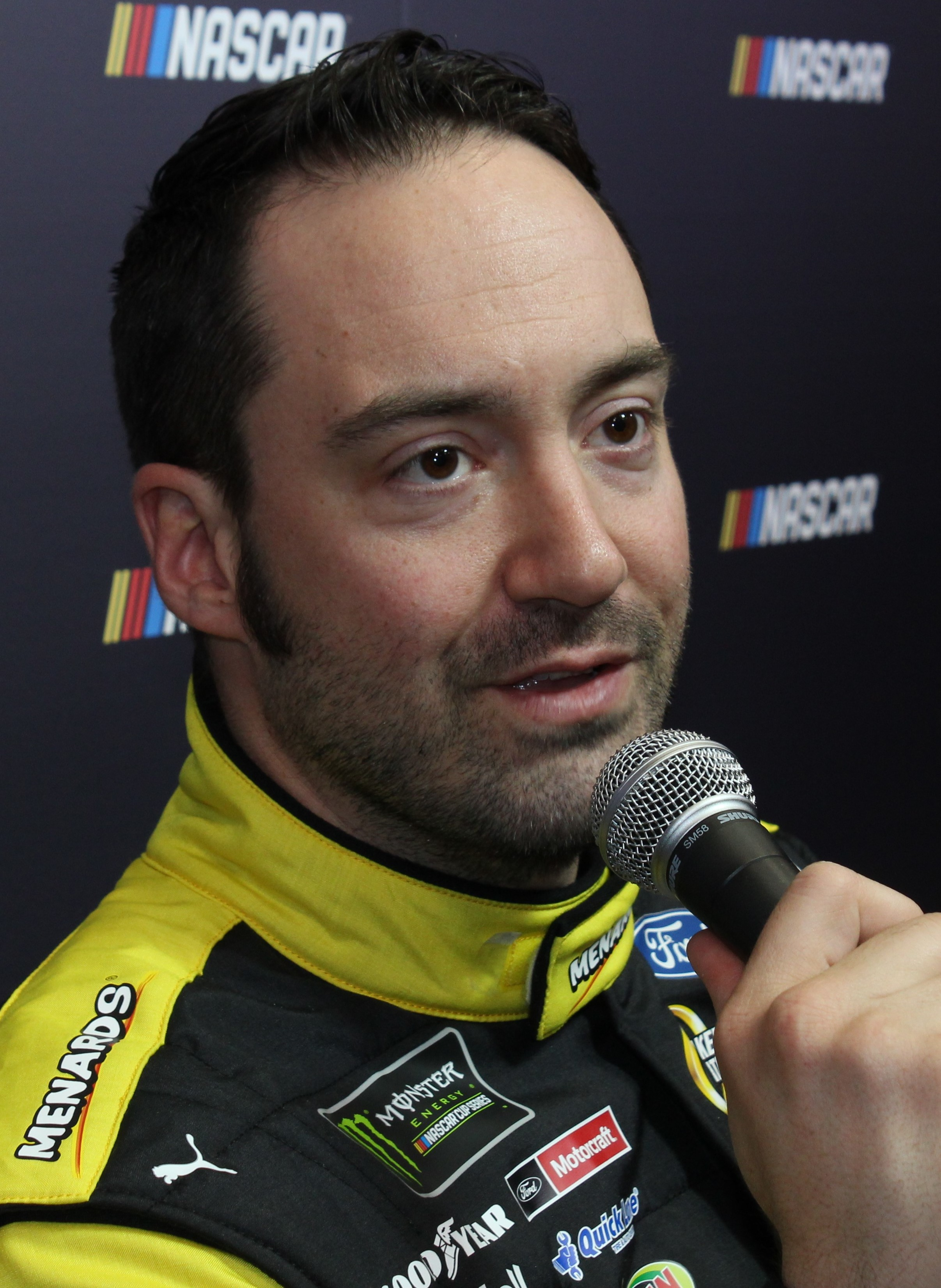
Paul Menard scored the pole position.

Paul Menard scored the pole for the race with a time of 29.998 and a speed of 180.012 mph (289.701 km/h).

=== Starting Lineup ===
Pos	No.	Driver	Team	Manufacturer	Time
1	21	Paul Menard	Wood Brothers Racing	Ford	29.998
2	12	Ryan Blaney	Team Penske	Ford	30.020
3	9	Chase Elliott	Hendrick Motorsports	Chevrolet	30.042
4	41	Kurt Busch	Stewart–Haas Racing	Ford	30.076
5	14	Clint Bowyer	Stewart–Haas Racing	Ford	30.085
6	10	Aric Almirola	Stewart–Haas Racing	Ford	30.124
7	2	Brad Keselowski	Team Penske	Ford	30.152
8	24	William Byron (R)	Hendrick Motorsports	Chevrolet	30.158
9	20	Erik Jones	Joe Gibbs Racing	Toyota	30.197
10	19	Daniel Suárez	Joe Gibbs Racing	Toyota	30.627
11	4	Kevin Harvick	Stewart–Haas Racing	Ford	30.208
12	22	Joey Logano	Team Penske	Ford	30.213
13	1	Jamie McMurray	Chip Ganassi Racing	Chevrolet	30.254
14	3	Austin Dillon	Richard Childress Racing	Chevrolet	30.329
15	88	Alex Bowman	Hendrick Motorsports	Chevrolet	30.379
16	18	Kyle Busch	Joe Gibbs Racing	Toyota	30.391
17	31	Ryan Newman	Richard Childress Racing	Chevrolet	30.459
18	42	Kyle Larson	Chip Ganassi Racing	Chevrolet	30.470
19	47	A. J. Allmendinger	JTG Daugherty Racing	Chevrolet	30.498
20	17	Ricky Stenhouse Jr.	Roush Fenway Racing	Ford	30.617
21	6	Trevor Bayne	Roush Fenway Racing	Ford	30.585
22	43	Bubba Wallace (R)	Richard Petty Motorsports	Chevrolet	30.616
23	38	David Ragan	Front Row Motorsports	Ford	30.701
24	95	Kasey Kahne	Leavine Family Racing	Chevrolet	30.712
25	13	Ty Dillon	Germain Racing	Chevrolet	30.775
26	34	Michael McDowell	Front Row Motorsports	Ford	30.980
27	15	Ross Chastain (i)	Premium Motorsports	Chevrolet	31.019
28	32	Matt DiBenedetto	Go Fas Racing	Ford	31.031
29	23	Gray Gaulding	BK Racing	Toyota	31.052
30	99	Kyle Weatherman	StarCom Racing	Chevrolet	31.627
31	00	Landon Cassill	StarCom Racing	Chevrolet	31.688
32	72	Corey LaJoie	TriStar Motorsports	Chevrolet	31.916
33	51	B. J. McLeod (i)	Rick Ware Racing	Chevrolet	31.934
34	7	Reed Sorenson	Premium Motorsports	Chevrolet	32.053
35	66	Timmy Hill (i)	MBM Motorsports	Toyota	32.226
36	78	Martin Truex Jr.†	Furniture Row Racing	Toyota	0.000
37	11	Denny Hamlin†	Joe Gibbs Racing	Toyota	0.000
38	48	Jimmie Johnson†	Hendrick Motorsports	Chevrolet	0.000
39	37	Chris Buescher†	JTG Daugherty Racing	Chevrolet	0.000
Official starting lineup

† The cars of Martin Truex Jr., Denny Hamlin, Jimmie Johnson, and Chris Buescher all started in the rear of the field after failing post-qualifying inspection.

== Race ==
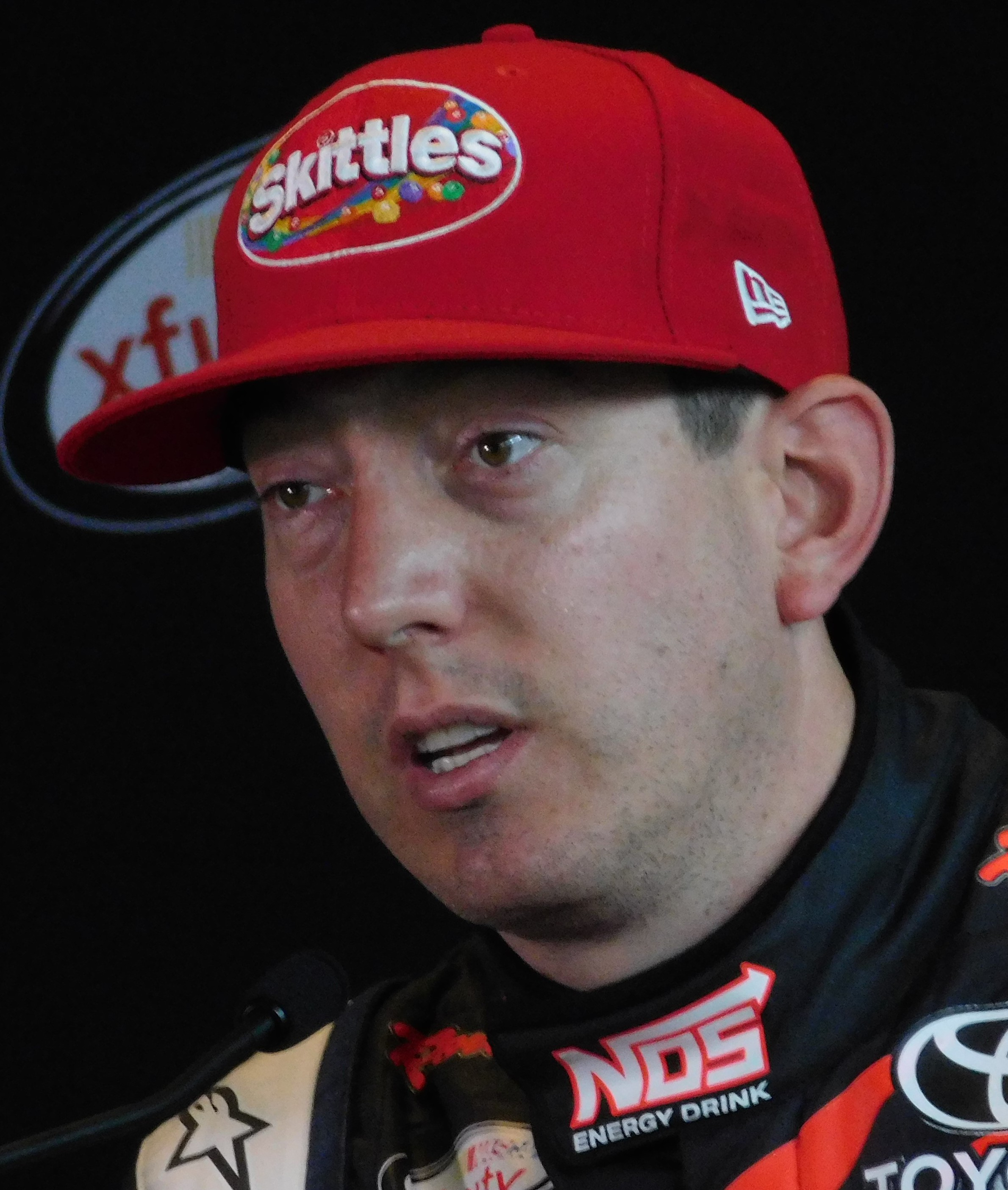
Kyle Busch won the race.

=== Stage Results ===
Stage 1 Laps: 80

Pos	No	Driver	Team	Manufacturer	Points
1	10	Aric Almirola	Stewart–Haas Racing	Ford	10
2	42	Kyle Larson	Chip Ganassi Racing	Chevrolet	9
3	78	Martin Truex Jr.	Furniture Row Racing	Toyota	8
4	41	Kurt Busch	Stewart–Haas Racing	Ford	7
5	4	Kevin Harvick	Stewart–Haas Racing	Ford	6
6	2	Brad Keselowski	Team Penske	Ford	5
7	12	Ryan Blaney	Team Penske	Ford	4
8	22	Joey Logano	Team Penske	Ford	3
9	9	Chase Elliott	Hendrick Motorsports	Chevrolet	2
10	20	Erik Jones	Joe Gibbs Racing	Toyota	1
Official stage one results

Stage 2 Laps: 80

Pos	No	Driver	Team	Manufacturer	Points
1	4	Kevin Harvick	Stewart–Haas Racing	Ford	10
2	41	Kurt Busch	Stewart–Haas Racing	Ford	9
3	42	Kyle Larson	Chip Ganassi Racing	Chevrolet	8
4	78	Martin Truex Jr.	Furniture Row Racing	Toyota	7
5	12	Ryan Blaney	Team Penske	Ford	6
6	2	Brad Keselowski	Team Penske	Ford	5
7	9	Chase Elliott	Hendrick Motorsports	Chevrolet	4
8	14	Clint Bowyer	Stewart–Haas Racing	Ford	3
9	11	Denny Hamlin	Joe Gibbs Racing	Toyota	2
10	22	Joey Logano	Team Penske	Ford	1
Official stage two results

== Final Lap ==
=== Final Stage Results ===
Stage 3 Laps: 107

Pos	Grid	No	Driver	Team	Manufacturer	Laps	Points
1	16	18	Kyle Busch	Joe Gibbs Racing	Toyota	267	40
2	18	42	Kyle Larson	Chip Ganassi Racing	Chevrolet	267	52
3	11	4	Kevin Harvick	Stewart–Haas Racing	Ford	267	50
4	36	78	Martin Truex Jr.	Furniture Row Racing	Toyota	267	48
5	5	14	Clint Bowyer	Stewart–Haas Racing	Ford	267	35
6	9	20	Erik Jones	Joe Gibbs Racing	Toyota	267	32
7	37	11	Denny Hamlin	Joe Gibbs Racing	Toyota	267	32
8	12	22	Joey Logano	Team Penske	Ford	267	33
9	7	2	Brad Keselowski	Team Penske	Ford	267	38
10	15	88	Alex Bowman	Hendrick Motorsports	Chevrolet	267	27
11	10	19	Daniel Suárez	Joe Gibbs Racing	Toyota	267	26
12	13	1	Jamie McMurray	Chip Ganassi Racing	Chevrolet	267	25
13	1	21	Paul Menard	Wood Brothers Racing	Ford	267	24
14	38	48	Jimmie Johnson	Hendrick Motorsports	Chevrolet	267	23
15	17	31	Ryan Newman	Richard Childress Racing	Chevrolet	267	22
16	20	17	Ricky Stenhouse Jr.	Roush Fenway Racing	Ford	266	21
17	4	41	Kurt Busch	Stewart–Haas Racing	Ford	266	36
18	2	12	Ryan Blaney	Team Penske	Ford	266	29
19	3	9	Chase Elliott	Hendrick Motorsports	Chevrolet	266	24
20	8	24	William Byron (R)	Hendrick Motorsports	Chevrolet	266	17
21	26	34	Michael McDowell	Front Row Motorsports	Ford	266	16
22	39	37	Chris Buescher	JTG Daugherty Racing	Chevrolet	266	15
23	22	43	Bubba Wallace (R)	Richard Petty Motorsports	Chevrolet	266	14
24	19	47	A. J. Allmendinger	JTG Daugherty Racing	Chevrolet	266	13
25	6	10	Aric Almirola	Stewart–Haas Racing	Ford	266	22
26	21	6	Trevor Bayne	Roush Fenway Racing	Ford	265	11
27	24	95	Kasey Kahne	Leavine Family Racing	Chevrolet	264	10
28	25	13	Ty Dillon	Germain Racing	Chevrolet	264	9
29	28	32	Matt DiBenedetto	Go Fas Racing	Ford	262	8
30	27	15	Ross Chastain (i)	Premium Motorsports	Chevrolet	261	0
31	29	23	Gray Gaulding	BK Racing	Toyota	260	6
32	34	7	Reed Sorenson	Premium Motorsports	Chevrolet	259	5
33	30	99	Kyle Weatherman	StarCom Racing	Chevrolet	255	4
34	32	72	Corey LaJoie	TriStar Motorsports	Chevrolet	233	3
35	33	51	B. J. McLeod (i)	Rick Ware Racing	Chevrolet	227	0
36	31	00	Landon Cassill	StarCom Racing	Chevrolet	224	1
37	14	3	Austin Dillon	Richard Childress Racing	Chevrolet	189	1
38	23	38	David Ragan	Front Row Motorsports	Ford	189	1
39	35	66	Timmy Hill (i)	MBM Motorsports	Toyota	185	0
Official race results

=== Race statistics ===
- Lead changes: 10 among different drivers
- Cautions/Laps: 5 for 23
- Red flags: 0
- Time of race: 2 hours, 50 minutes and 52 seconds
- Average speed: 140.636 miles per hour (226.332 km/h)

== Media ==
=== Television ===
NBC Sports covered the race on the television side. Rick Allen, Jeff Burton, Steve Letarte, and 2005 race winner Dale Earnhardt Jr., in his debut as a color commentator for NASCAR on NBC, had the call in the booth for the race. Dave Burns, Marty Snider and Kelli Stavast reported from pit lane during the race.

NBCSN
Booth announcers	Pit reporters
Lap-by-lap: Rick Allen; Color-commentator: Jeff Burton; Color-commentator: Steve Letarte; Color-commentator: Dale Earnhardt Jr.	Dave Burns; Marty Snider; Kelli Stavast

=== Radio ===
The Motor Racing Network had the radio call for the race, which was simulcast on Sirius XM NASCAR Radio.

MRN
Booth announcers	Turn announcers	Pit reporters
Lead announcer: Jeff Striegle; Announcer: Dave Moody; Announcer: Rusty Wallace	Turns 1 & 2: Mike Bagley; Turns 3 & 4: Kyle Rickey	Alex Hayden; Pete Pistone; Steve Post; Kim Coon

== Standings after the race ==
Drivers' Championship standings

	Pos	Driver	Points
	1	Kyle Busch	736
	2	Kevin Harvick	674 (–62)
	3	Joey Logano	617 (–119)
1	4	Martin Truex Jr.	594 (–142)
1	5	Brad Keselowski	592 (–144)
	6	Clint Bowyer	579 (–157)
	7	Kurt Busch	560 (–176)
	8	Denny Hamlin	537 (–199)
	9	Kyle Larson	524 (–212)
1	10	Ryan Blaney	495 (–241)
1	11	Aric Almirola	493 (–243)
	12	Jimmie Johnson	442 (–294)
	13	Chase Elliott	435 (–301)
	14	Erik Jones	408 (–328)
	15	Alex Bowman	390 (–346)
	16	Ricky Stenhouse Jr.	367 (–369)
Official driver's standings

Manufacturers' Championship standings

	Pos	Manufacturer	Points
1	1	Toyota	620
1	2	Ford	614 (–6)
	3	Chevrolet	547 (–73)
Official manufacturers' standings

- Note: Only the first 16 positions are included for the driver standings.
- . – Driver has clinched a position in the Monster Energy NASCAR Cup Series playoffs.

Previous race: 2018 Toyota/Save Mart 350	Monster Energy NASCAR Cup Series; 2018 season	Next race: 2018 Coke Zero Sugar 400
