= 2018 Monster Energy NASCAR Cup Series =

American motorsport season

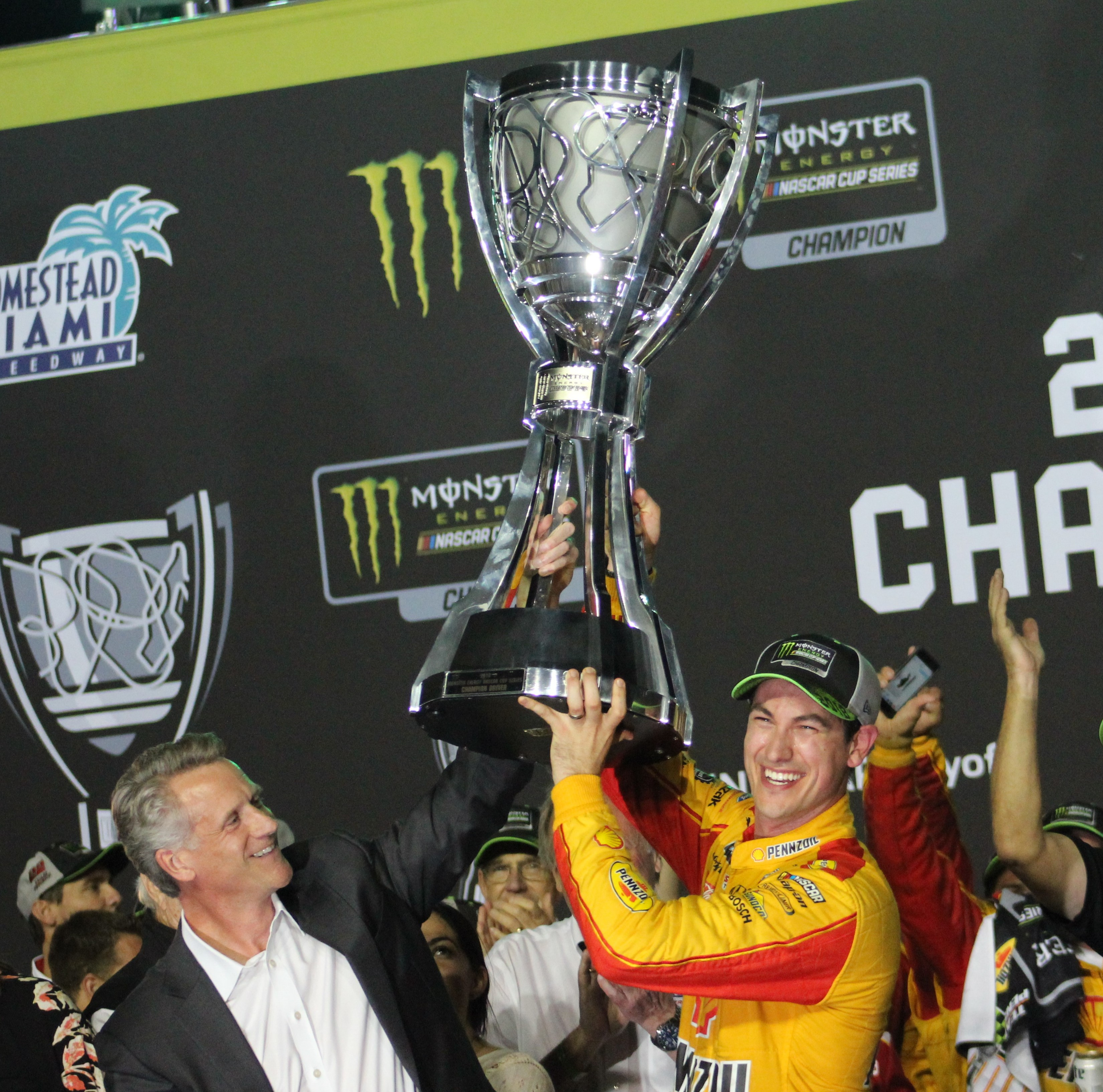
Joey Logano, the 2018 Monster Energy NASCAR Cup Series champion

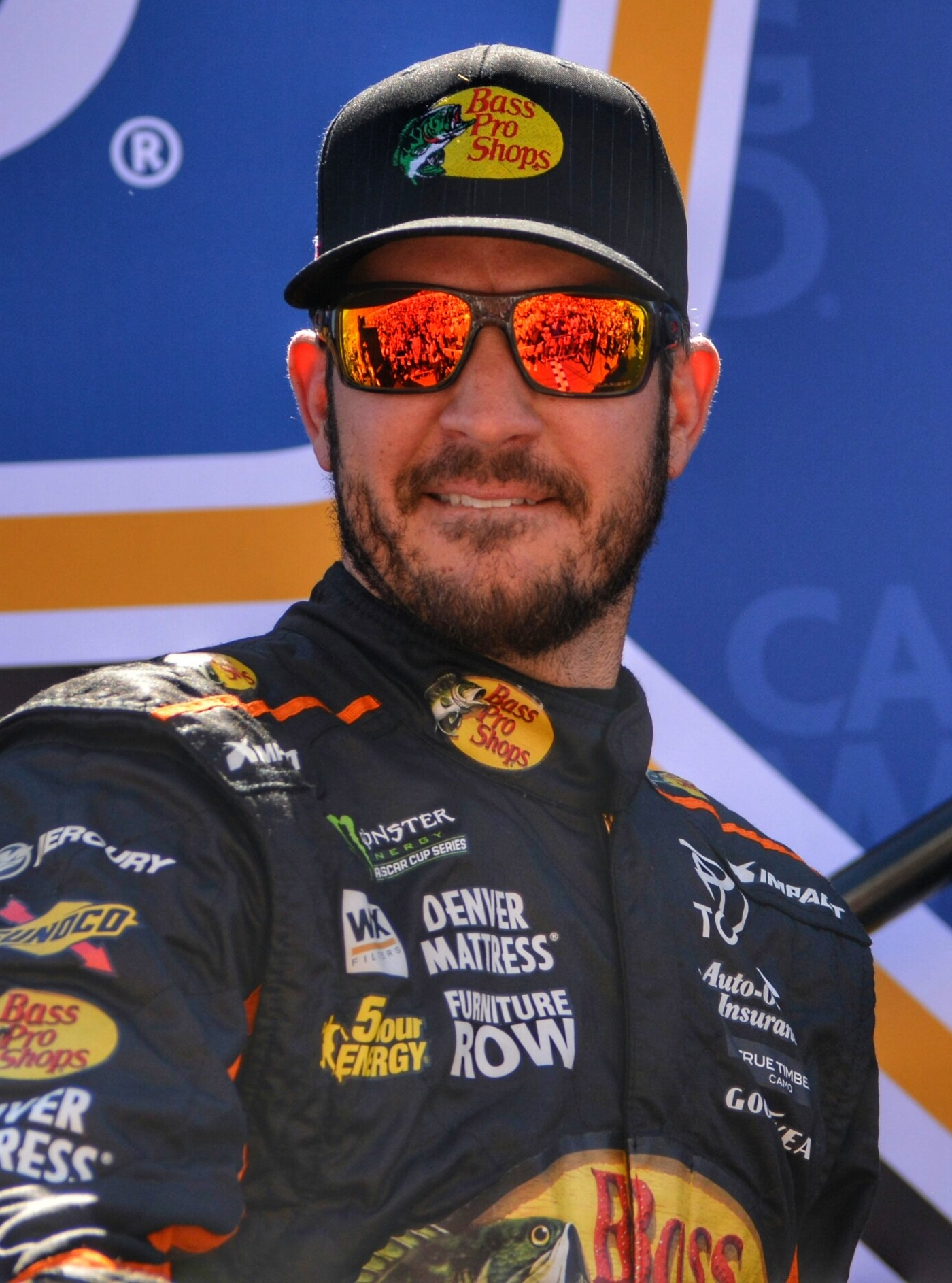
Martin Truex Jr., the defending champion, finished 5 points behind Joey Logano, in second place.

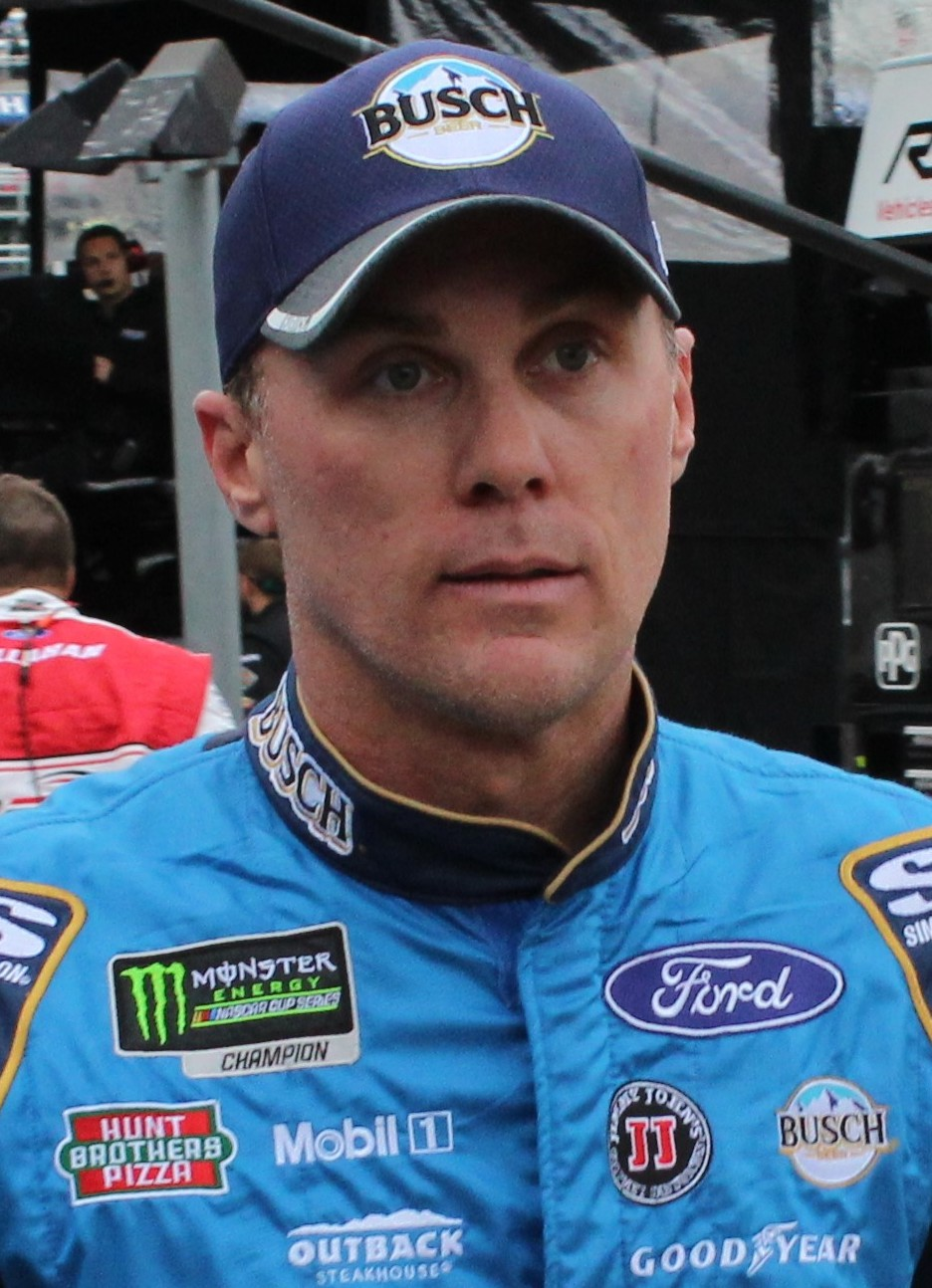
Kevin Harvick finished 6 points behind Joey Logano, in third place.

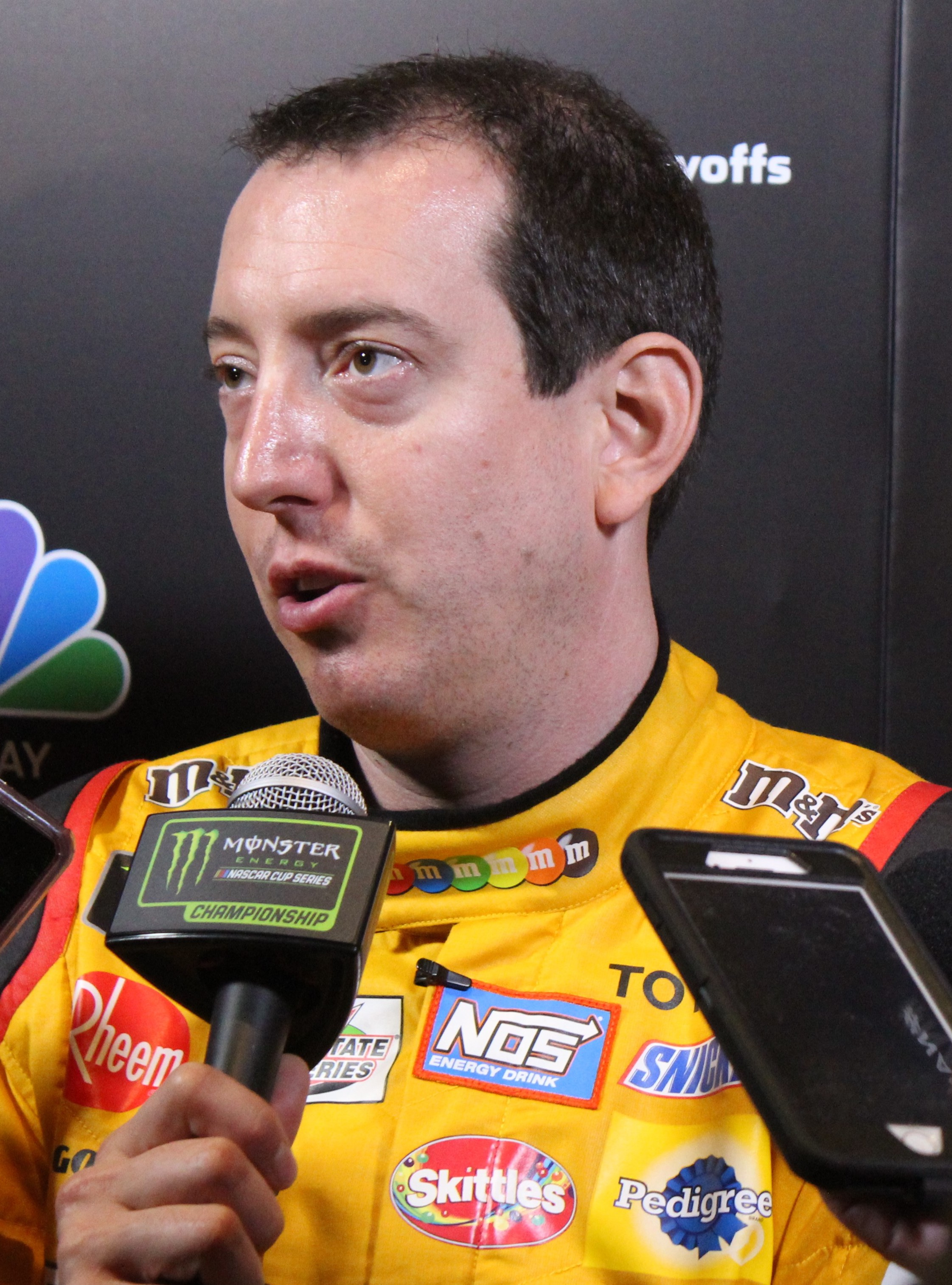
Kyle Busch finished 7 points behind Joey Logano, in fourth place. Busch won the 2018 Regular Season title.

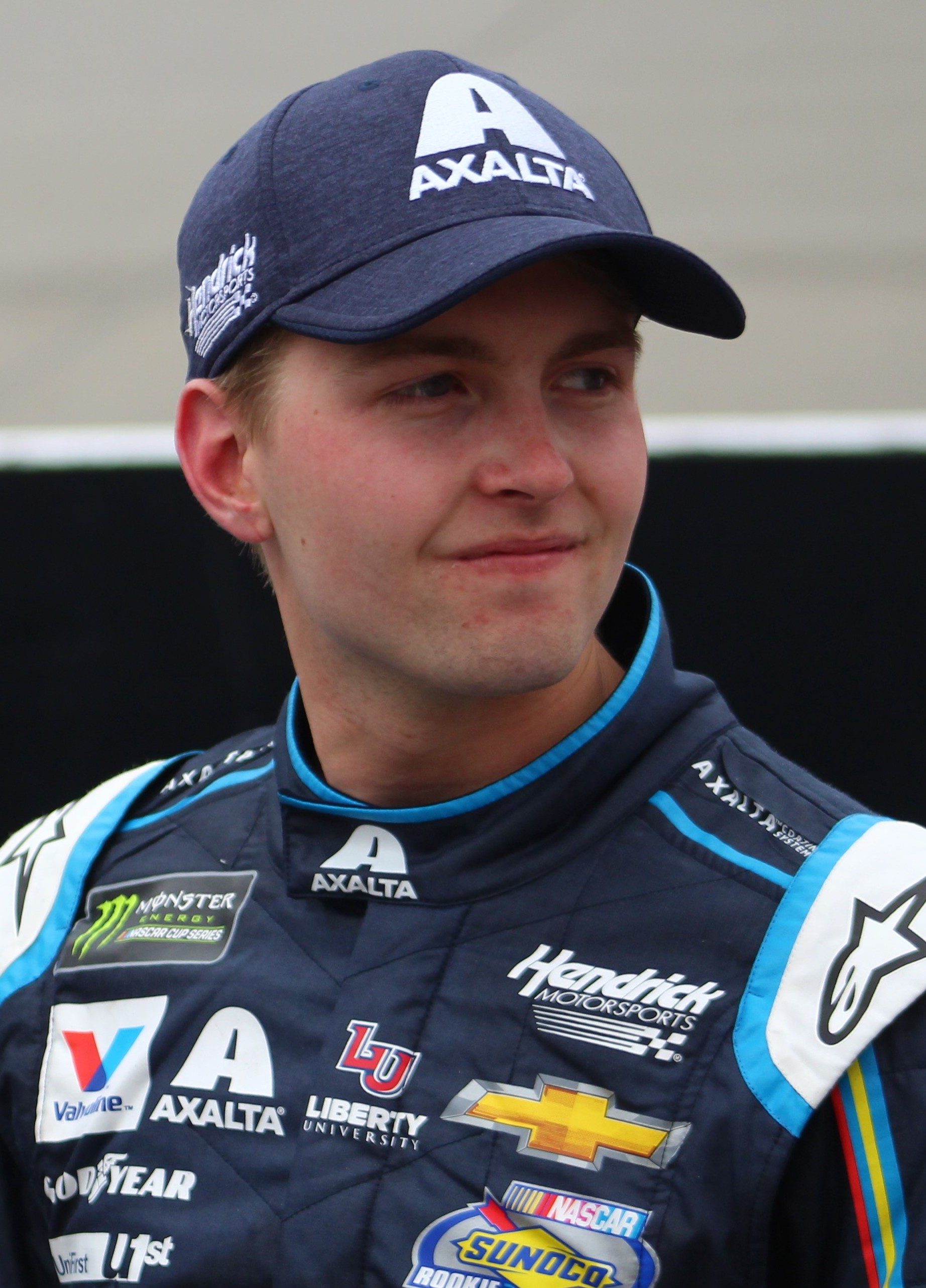
William Byron the 2018 NASCAR Rookie of the Year

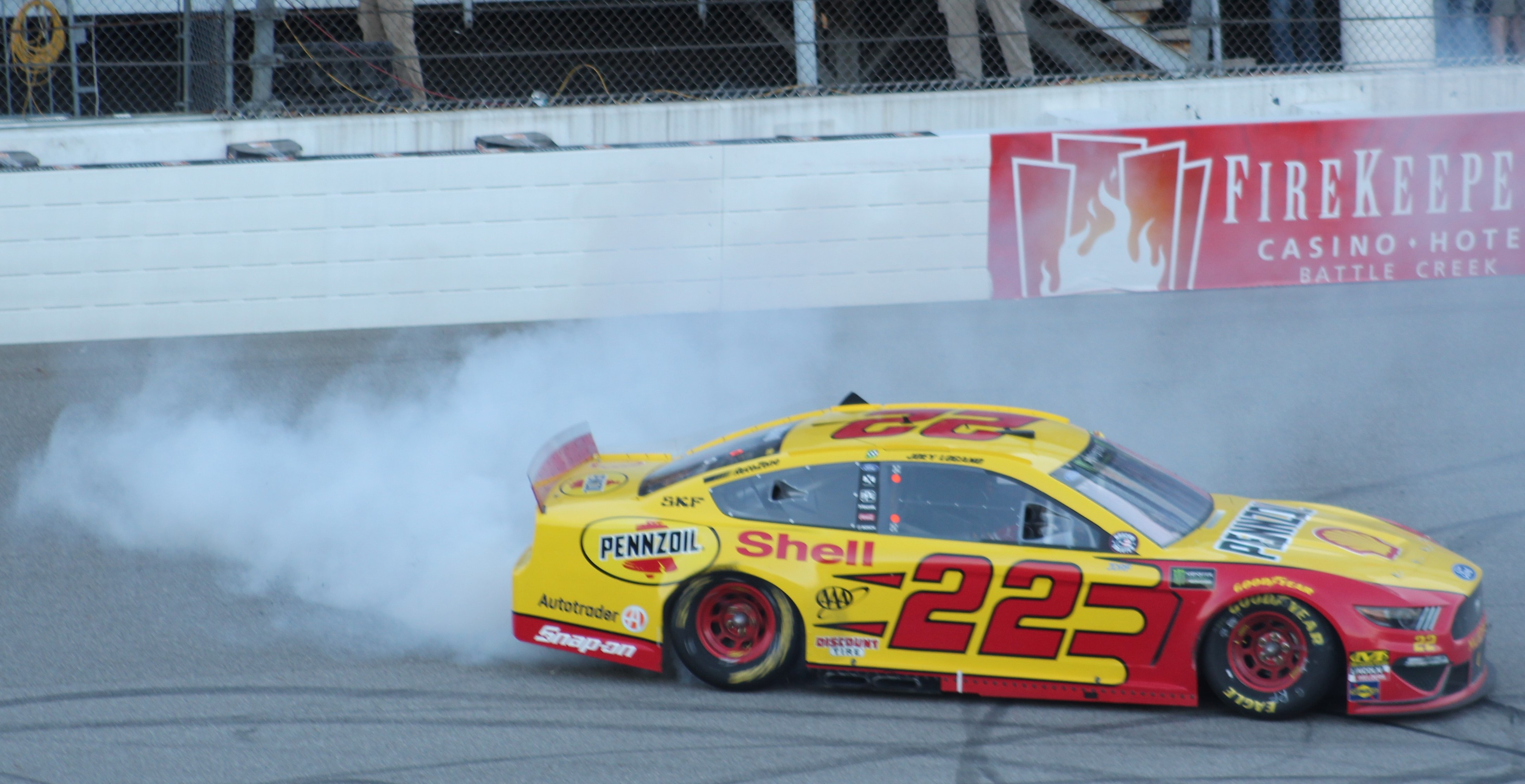
Ford won the Manufacturers' championship with 19 wins and 1310 points. (Car pictured in 2019)

The 2018 Monster Energy NASCAR Cup Series was the 70th season of NASCAR professional stock car racing in the United States, and the 47th modern-era Cup series season. The season began at Daytona International Speedway with the Advance Auto Parts Clash, the Can-Am Duel qualifying races and the 60th running of the Daytona 500. The regular season ended with the Brickyard 400 on September 9, 2018. The playoffs ended with the Ford EcoBoost 400 at Homestead-Miami Speedway on November 18, 2018. Martin Truex Jr. was the defending champion, having won his first in the series.

The 2018 season was the fourth of a 10-year television contract with Fox Sports and NBC Sports and the third of a five-year race sanctioning agreement with all tracks. It was the first season to feature the Regular Season Championship trophy, which is awarded at the final race before the playoffs. Kyle Busch clinched the MENCS Regular Season Championship trophy at the end of Stage 2 of the 2018 Brickyard 400.

The season marked the debut of the Chevrolet Camaro ZL1, which replaced the outgoing Chevrolet SS and became the first coupe-based Chevrolet stock car since the Monte Carlo SS was discontinued in 2007. This was also the last season for Kasey Kahne, who announced his intention to retire from racing at the end of the season and was forced to step away in early October 2018 after not being medically cleared to continue, as well as BK Racing who sold its equipment to Front Row Motorsports, and Furniture Row Racing, which ceased operations after 2018. It was also the final season Ford fielded the Fusion, replacing it with the Ford Mustang in 2019.

Joey Logano, driving for Team Penske in a Ford won the championship, after defeating Martin Truex Jr., Kevin Harvick and Kyle Busch in a 1–2–3–4 finish for the "Championship 4" at the final round at Homestead. Logano won three races during the course of the season, having also won the spring race at Talladega and the fall race at Martinsville. Austin Dillon was the Daytona 500 winner. Kyle Busch and Harvick won the most races with eight each, with Denny Hamlin and seven-time series champion Jimmie Johnson concluding their first winless seasons in full-time Cup competition. The 2018 season also marked the fifteenth consecutive and final time that Johnson made the playoffs since its inception in 2004. Erik Jones and Chase Elliott won their first career victories and William Byron became Rookie of the Year.

== Teams and drivers ==
=== Chartered teams ===
Manufacturer	Team	No.	Race driver	Crew chief
Chevrolet	Chip Ganassi Racing	1	Jamie McMurray	Matt McCall
Chevrolet	Chip Ganassi Racing	42	Kyle Larson	Chad Johnston
Chevrolet	Germain Racing	13	Ty Dillon	Matt Borland
Chevrolet	Hendrick Motorsports	9	Chase Elliott	Alan Gustafson
Chevrolet	Hendrick Motorsports	24	William Byron (R)	Darian Grubb
Chevrolet	Hendrick Motorsports	48	Jimmie Johnson	Chad Knaus
Chevrolet	Hendrick Motorsports	88	Alex Bowman	Greg Ives
Chevrolet	JTG Daugherty Racing	37	Chris Buescher	Trent Owens
Chevrolet	JTG Daugherty Racing	47	A. J. Allmendinger	Tristan Smith
Chevrolet	Leavine Family Racing	95	Kasey Kahne 25	Travis Mack 15; Jon Leonard 21
Chevrolet	Leavine Family Racing	95	Regan Smith 11	Travis Mack 15; Jon Leonard 21
Chevrolet	Premium Motorsports	15		
Chevrolet	Premium Motorsports	15	Danica Patrick 1	Tony Eury Jr. 1
Chevrolet	Premium Motorsports	15	Ross Chastain 33 (R)	Todd Parrott 2 Pat Tryson 34
Chevrolet	Premium Motorsports	15	Justin Marks 2	Todd Parrott 2 Pat Tryson 34
Chevrolet	Richard Childress Racing	3	Austin Dillon	Justin Alexander
Chevrolet	Richard Childress Racing	31	Ryan Newman	Luke Lambert
Chevrolet	Richard Petty Motorsports	43	Bubba Wallace (R)	Drew Blickensderfer
Chevrolet	StarCom Racing	00	Jeffrey Earnhardt 5	Tony Furr 16; Jonas Bell 1 Rick Bourgeois 19
Chevrolet	StarCom Racing	00	Landon Cassill 25	Tony Furr 16; Jonas Bell 1 Rick Bourgeois 19
Chevrolet	StarCom Racing	00	Joey Gase 5	Tony Furr 16; Jonas Bell 1 Rick Bourgeois 19
Chevrolet	StarCom Racing	00	Tomy Drissi 1	Tony Furr 16; Jonas Bell 1 Rick Bourgeois 19
Chevrolet	TriStar Motorsports	72	Corey LaJoie 23	Frankie Kerr
Chevrolet	TriStar Motorsports	72	Cole Whitt 13	Frankie Kerr
Ford	Front Row Motorsports	34	Michael McDowell	Derrick Finley
Ford	Front Row Motorsports	38	David Ragan	Seth Barbour
Ford	Go Fas Racing	32	Matt DiBenedetto	Gene Nead 2 Randy Cox 34
Ford	Roush Fenway Racing	6	Trevor Bayne 21	Matt Puccia
Ford	Roush Fenway Racing	6	Matt Kenseth 15	Matt Puccia
Ford	Roush Fenway Racing	17	Ricky Stenhouse Jr.	Brian Pattie
Ford	Stewart–Haas Racing	4	Kevin Harvick	Rodney Childers 34; Tony Gibson 2
Ford	Stewart–Haas Racing	10	Aric Almirola	Johnny Klausmeier
Ford	Stewart–Haas Racing	14	Clint Bowyer	Mike Bugarewicz
Ford	Stewart–Haas Racing	41	Kurt Busch	Billy Scott
Ford	Team Penske	2	Brad Keselowski	Paul Wolfe
Ford	Team Penske	12	Ryan Blaney	Jeremy Bullins
Ford	Team Penske	22	Joey Logano	Todd Gordon
Ford	Wood Brothers Racing	21	Paul Menard	Greg Erwin
Toyota	Furniture Row Racing	78	Martin Truex Jr.	Cole Pearn
Toyota	Joe Gibbs Racing	11	Denny Hamlin	Mike Wheeler
Toyota	Joe Gibbs Racing	18	Kyle Busch	Adam Stevens
Toyota	Joe Gibbs Racing	19	Daniel Suárez	Scott Graves 30; Dave Rogers 6
Toyota	Joe Gibbs Racing	20	Erik Jones	Chris Gayle
Toyota 34 Ford 2	BK Racing	23	Gray Gaulding 17	Rick Bourgeois 17; Tony Furr 19
Toyota 34 Ford 2	BK Racing	23	J. J. Yeley 13	Rick Bourgeois 17; Tony Furr 19
Toyota 34 Ford 2	BK Racing	23	Blake Jones 3	Rick Bourgeois 17; Tony Furr 19
Toyota 34 Ford 2	BK Racing	23	Spencer Gallagher 1	Rick Bourgeois 17; Tony Furr 19
Toyota 34 Ford 2	BK Racing	23	Joey Gase 1	Rick Bourgeois 17; Tony Furr 19
Toyota 34 Ford 2	BK Racing	23	Alon Day 1	Rick Bourgeois 17; Tony Furr 19
Chevrolet 23 Ford 11 Toyota 2	Rick Ware Racing	51	Justin Marks 1	Pat Tryson 1 Ken Evans 34; George Church 1
Chevrolet 23 Ford 11 Toyota 2	Rick Ware Racing	51	Harrison Rhodes 5	Pat Tryson 1 Ken Evans 34; George Church 1
Chevrolet 23 Ford 11 Toyota 2	Rick Ware Racing	51	Cole Custer 3	Pat Tryson 1 Ken Evans 34; George Church 1
Chevrolet 23 Ford 11 Toyota 2	Rick Ware Racing	51	Timmy Hill 3	Pat Tryson 1 Ken Evans 34; George Church 1
Chevrolet 23 Ford 11 Toyota 2	Rick Ware Racing	51	Cody Ware 3	Pat Tryson 1 Ken Evans 34; George Church 1
Chevrolet 23 Ford 11 Toyota 2	Rick Ware Racing	51	B. J. McLeod 13	Pat Tryson 1 Ken Evans 34; George Church 1
Chevrolet 23 Ford 11 Toyota 2	Rick Ware Racing	51	Chris Cook 1	Pat Tryson 1 Ken Evans 34; George Church 1
Chevrolet 23 Ford 11 Toyota 2	Rick Ware Racing	51	Ray Black Jr. 1	Pat Tryson 1 Ken Evans 34; George Church 1
Chevrolet 23 Ford 11 Toyota 2	Rick Ware Racing	51	Josh Bilicki 1	Pat Tryson 1 Ken Evans 34; George Church 1
Chevrolet 23 Ford 11 Toyota 2	Rick Ware Racing	51	Reed Sorenson 1	Pat Tryson 1 Ken Evans 34; George Church 1
Chevrolet 23 Ford 11 Toyota 2	Rick Ware Racing	51	David Starr 1	Pat Tryson 1 Ken Evans 34; George Church 1
Chevrolet 23 Ford 11 Toyota 2	Rick Ware Racing	51	Stanton Barrett 1	Pat Tryson 1 Ken Evans 34; George Church 1
Chevrolet 23 Ford 11 Toyota 2	Rick Ware Racing	51	Jeb Burton 1	Pat Tryson 1 Ken Evans 34; George Church 1
Chevrolet 23 Ford 11 Toyota 2	Rick Ware Racing	51	Joey Gase 1	Pat Tryson 1 Ken Evans 34; George Church 1

=== Limited schedule ===
Manufacturer	Team	No.	Race driver	Crew chief	Round(s)
Chevrolet	Beard Motorsports	62	Brendan Gaughan	Darren Shaw	4
Chevrolet	NY Racing Team	7	J. J. Yeley	George Church	1
Chevrolet	Premium Motorsports	7	J. J. Yeley	Todd Parrott 15; Peter Sospenzo 11	2
Chevrolet	Premium Motorsports	7	D. J. Kennington	Todd Parrott 15; Peter Sospenzo 11	3
Chevrolet	Premium Motorsports	7	Reed Sorenson	Todd Parrott 15; Peter Sospenzo 11	6
Chevrolet	Premium Motorsports	7	Jeffrey Earnhardt	Todd Parrott 15; Peter Sospenzo 11	1
Chevrolet	Premium Motorsports	7	Jesse Little	Todd Parrott 15; Peter Sospenzo 11	1
Chevrolet	Premium Motorsports	7	Garrett Smithley	Todd Parrott 15; Peter Sospenzo 11	1
Chevrolet	Premium Motorsports	7	Ross Chastain	Todd Parrott 15; Peter Sospenzo 11	1
Chevrolet	Premium Motorsports	7	Hermie Sadler	Todd Parrott 15; Peter Sospenzo 11	1
Chevrolet	Premium Motorsports	55	Joey Gase	Todd Parrott 15; Peter Sospenzo 11	1
Chevrolet	Premium Motorsports	55	Reed Sorenson	Todd Parrott 15; Peter Sospenzo 11	7
Chevrolet	Premium Motorsports	55	J. J. Yeley	Todd Parrott 15; Peter Sospenzo 11	1
Chevrolet	Premium Motorsports	55	Jeffrey Earnhardt	Todd Parrott 15; Peter Sospenzo 11	1
Chevrolet	Richard Childress Racing	8	Daniel Hemric	Brandon Thomas	2
Chevrolet	StarCom Racing	99	Derrike Cope	Domenick Turse 3 Jonas Bell 2 Derrike Cope 1 Wayne Carroll Jr. 12	3
Chevrolet	StarCom Racing	99	Garrett Smithley	Domenick Turse 3 Jonas Bell 2 Derrike Cope 1 Wayne Carroll Jr. 12	2
Chevrolet	StarCom Racing	99	Kyle Weatherman	Domenick Turse 3 Jonas Bell 2 Derrike Cope 1 Wayne Carroll Jr. 12	7
Chevrolet	StarCom Racing	99	Landon Cassill	Domenick Turse 3 Jonas Bell 2 Derrike Cope 1 Wayne Carroll Jr. 12	4
Chevrolet	StarCom Racing	99	Gray Gaulding	Domenick Turse 3 Jonas Bell 2 Derrike Cope 1 Wayne Carroll Jr. 12	2
Ford	RBR Enterprises	92	David Gilliland	Mike Hester	1
Ford	RBR Enterprises	92	Timothy Peters	Mike Hester	2
Toyota	Gaunt Brothers Racing	96	D. J. Kennington	Mark Hillman	7
Toyota	Gaunt Brothers Racing	96	Parker Kligerman	Mark Hillman	4
Toyota	Gaunt Brothers Racing	96	Jeffrey Earnhardt	Mark Hillman	10
Toyota	Gaunt Brothers Racing	96	Jesse Little	Mark Hillman	1
Toyota	Obaika Racing	97	David Starr	Dan Stillman	2
Toyota	Obaika Racing	97	Tanner Berryhill	Dan Stillman	2
Ford 1 Toyota 19 Chevrolet 1	MBM Motorsports	66	Mark Thompson	Mike Hillman Sr. 4 Robert Scott 12; Gary Showalter 1 Michael Groves 4	1
Ford 1 Toyota 19 Chevrolet 1	MBM Motorsports	66	Chad Finchum	Mike Hillman Sr. 4 Robert Scott 12; Gary Showalter 1 Michael Groves 4	1
Ford 1 Toyota 19 Chevrolet 1	MBM Motorsports	66	Timmy Hill	Mike Hillman Sr. 4 Robert Scott 12; Gary Showalter 1 Michael Groves 4	19
Chevrolet 3 Ford 3	Rick Ware Racing	52	Cody Ware	George Church 5 Ken Evans 1	1
Chevrolet 3 Ford 3	Rick Ware Racing	52	B. J. McLeod	George Church 5 Ken Evans 1	2
Chevrolet 3 Ford 3	Rick Ware Racing	52	J. J. Yeley	George Church 5 Ken Evans 1	1
Chevrolet 3 Ford 3	Rick Ware Racing	52	Gray Gaulding	George Church 5 Ken Evans 1	1
Chevrolet 3 Ford 3	Rick Ware Racing	52	Harrison Rhodes	George Church 5 Ken Evans 1	1

=== Changes ===
==== Teams ====
- Team Penske would expand to a three-car team with the addition of Ryan Blaney in the No. 12, previously with Wood Brothers Racing in the No. 21 in 2017.
- On August 29, 2017, Hendrick Motorsports announced that the No. 24 team driven by Chase Elliott would be changing to the No. 9 team, while the No. 5 would become the new No. 24 team to be driven by rookie William Byron. Alan Gustafson would remain as Elliott's crew chief while Darian Grubb would work with William Byron.
- Furniture Row Racing would downsize from a two car team to a one car team, shutting down the No. 77 team as sponsor 5-hour Energy moved to the No. 78 team.
- On September 25, 2017, it was announced that a new Chevrolet team, StarCom Racing, would open and run the No. 00 car full-time, with driver Derrike Cope, moving from Premium Motorsports. Cope was planning to drive the majority of the 2018 schedule with other drivers possibly running races, however, Jeffrey Earnhardt was later announced as the driver for the season. The No. 00 was also guaranteed to run every race as they had leased a charter from the now shuttered Richard Childress Racing No. 27 team. Cope would instead run a second car later in the season, the No. 99 Camaro. After Fontana, Earnhardt and StarCom mutually agreed to part ways. After starting the season without a ride, Landon Cassill would take over the 00 for Martinsville, Texas, Bristol, Richmond and possibly the rest of the season. Joey Gase was later announced as the driver for Talladega and road course ringer Tomy Drissi was announced as the driver for Sonoma. The No. 99 would debut with Cope at the first Dover race of the season.
- On November 14, 2017, JTG Daugherty Racing announced that they would switch their technical alliance from Richard Childress Racing to Hendrick Motorsports in the 2018 season.
- On November 22, 2017, Rick Ware Racing announced an expansion from a 30-race open team to one full-time team for Ray Black Jr. and one part-time team for Cody Ware, Kyle Weatherman, B. J. McLeod and John Graham. However, before the season began, the deal with Black fell through, but Black will still drive the No. 51 at Daytona in July. RWR has fielded the No. 51 for Black, Justin Marks, Cole Custer, Harrison Rhodes, Timmy Hill, Cody Ware, B.J. McLeod, and Chris Cook. The No. 52 would make its debut at Sonoma with Cody Ware.
- On December 7, 2017, after it was announced that Richard Petty Motorsports would be switching manufacturers from Ford to Chevrolet, RPM also announced that in 2018 they would have a technical alliance with Richard Childress Racing.
- On December 12, 2017, it was announced that Circle Sport Racing and The Motorsports Group, who became one team in 2017, parted ways. Both teams will field a car for 2018. Circle Sport will continue with the No. 33, but Jeffrey Earnhardt was released even though he was going to be the No. 33 driver in 2018. Both teams will have different drivers and sponsors.
- On January 3, 2018, it was announced that Team Penske had purchased a charter from Roush Fenway Racing in order to field the No. 12 car for Ryan Blaney full-time in 2018. The charter had been leased to JTG Daugherty Racing to field the No. 37 for Chris Buescher in 2017, and had previously been used for the No. 16 of Greg Biffle in 2016.
- On January 17, 2018, it was announced that RBR Enterprises would join the Cup series and would field the No. 92 Ford to attempt the Daytona 500 with David Gilliland behind the wheel. The team spent the past eight seasons competing 79 races in the Truck series.
- On January 22, 2018, it was announced that Gaunt Brothers Racing would return to the Daytona 500 with D. J. Kennington driving the No. 96 Toyota. The team entered the spring ISM Raceway race, which would be their first appearance on a non-restrictor track.
- On January 23, 2018, Richard Childress Racing announced that it would downsize to two full-time teams and one part-time team for 2018. The No. 27 team would be renumbered as the No. 8 and it would run two races with Daniel Hemric.
- On April 25, 2018, Roush Fenway Racing announced that Matt Kenseth would reunite with RFR and would share the No. 6 car with Trevor Bayne for the 2018 season.
- On August 5, 2018, Leavine Family Racing announced that its technical alliance with Richard Childress Racing would end after the 2018 season.
- On August 23, 2018, Front Row Motorsports purchased majority of the assets of the bankrupt BK Racing for $2.08 million, outbidding GMS Racing's offer of $1.8 million. In addition, the trustee of BK Racing sold some secondary assets to Obaika Racing for $265,000 and a tractor to Rick Ware Racing to $35,000.
- On September 4, 2018, it was announced that Furniture Row Racing would cease operations after the 2018 season, making defending champion Martin Truex Jr. a free agent for 2019.
- On September 12, 2018, NASCAR collaborated with the Race Team Alliance and Twitter to unveil customized hashtags and emojis for the top 16 drivers entering the playoffs. Each driver would have their hashtag and emoji displayed on the sides of their cars until they were eliminated from contention. Non-playoff drivers could have their hashtags and the Twitter logo displayed on their cars. This was in effect until the 2018 Hollywood Casino 400. From the 2018 First Data 500 to the 2018 Can-Am 500, all hashtag and emoji labels were replaced with the NBC logo. On November 12, 2018, NASCAR partnered with Snapchat to have all cars sport Snapcodes at the season-ending 2018 Ford EcoBoost 400.
- On October 5, 2018, Obaika Racing announced that they would attempt their first ever MENCS race at Talladega Superspeedway, fielding the No. 97 Space Grill Toyota Camry for the 2018 1000Bulbs.com 500 with David Starr. The team ultimately failed to qualify in the race, but made the field with Starr in their second attempt at the fall Texas race.

==== Drivers ====
- On April 25, 2017, Dale Earnhardt Jr. announced that he would retire from full-time racing. On July 20, 2017, Alex Bowman was announced as his full-time replacement.
- On July 11, 2017, it was announced that Erik Jones would be replacing Matt Kenseth in the No. 20 car for Joe Gibbs Racing. On November 4, 2017, Kenseth announced he would be stepping away from full-time racing and would not compete in any 2018 events, but on April 25, 2018, it was announced that Kenseth would drive the No. 6 part-time along with Trevor Bayne for Roush Fenway Racing.
- On July 26, 2017, it was announced that Paul Menard would replace Ryan Blaney in the No. 21 car for Wood Brothers Racing.
- On August 1, 2017, it was announced that Kurt Busch would become a free agent after driving the No. 41 car for Stewart–Haas Racing. However, on December 11, 2017, it was announced that Busch had re-signed with Stewart–Haas Racing on a 1-year deal.
- On August 7, 2017, it was announced that Kasey Kahne would be leaving the No. 5 Hendrick Motorsports car at the end of 2017. On August 8, 2017, it was announced that William Byron would be his full-time replacement in the renumbered No. 24 car and would run for Rookie of the Year honors. On September 19, 2017, it was announced that Kahne would be driving the No. 95 Chevrolet Camaro ZL1 for Leavine Family Racing, replacing Michael McDowell.
- On September 12, 2017, Danica Patrick announced that she would not be returning to Stewart–Haas Racing in 2018. Later that day, Richard Petty Motorsports announced that Aric Almirola would not be returning to the No. 43 team in 2018. On October 25, 2017, Richard Petty Motorsports announced that Bubba Wallace would drive the No. 43 and compete for Rookie of the Year Honors. In 2017, Wallace Jr. was going to run the full NASCAR Xfinity Series schedule driving the No. 6 Ford Mustang GT for Roush Fenway Racing, but the team shut down in June due to a lack of sponsorship. Wallace would also drive the No. 43 in the Cup series, filling in for Almirola when he was injured in a crash at Kansas. Wallace also drove the No. 98 Ford Mustang GT for Biagi-DenBeste Racing in the Xfinity Series at Chicago, and the No. 99 Chevrolet Silverado for MDM Motorsports in the NASCAR Camping World Truck Series at Michigan.
- On September 25, 2017, Derrike Cope announced he would leave the No. 55 car of Premium Motorsports to drive the new No. 99 for StarCom Racing. Cope also serves as Team Manager, and the No. 00 team will run the full schedule after securing a charter and Landon Cassill will drive the majority of the schedule.
- On October 10, 2017, Front Row Motorsports announced that Landon Cassill would not return to drive the team's No. 34 entry in 2018. On December 14, 2017, it was confirmed that Michael McDowell would drive full-time in the No. 34, and David Ragan would return to FRM in the No. 38.
- On November 8, 2017, Stewart–Haas Racing announced that Aric Almirola would take over the No. 10 Ford full-time in 2018, replacing Danica Patrick.
- On November 15, 2017, Danica Patrick announced that she would be retiring from auto racing. She spoke of plans to race in the 2018 Daytona 500 (NASCAR) and the 2018 Indy 500 (IndyCar) before retiring.
- On November 22, 2017, it was announced that Ray Black Jr. would compete full-time and challenge for Rookie of the Year with Rick Ware Racing's No. 51 chartered entry. The No. 51 did not have a charter in 2017. RWR also announced a part-time No. 52 team with drivers Cody Ware, Kyle Weatherman, B. J. McLeod and John Graham. However, in early February, it was announced that Justin Marks would drive the No. 51 in the Daytona 500, even though Ray Black Jr. was announced as the full-time driver. It was rumored that the deal fell through. Marks, Black, Cole Custer, Harrison Rhodes, Timmy Hill, Cody Ware, B.J. McLeod, and Chris Cook all made starts in the car. The No. 52 would make its debut at Sonoma with Cody Ware.
- On January 30, 2018, StarCom Racing signed Jeffrey Earnhardt to drive its chartered No. 00 Chevrolet for the season. Earnhardt would replace Derrike Cope, who would remain as team manager and would also drive a second car for the team later in the year. Earnhardt previously drove for Circle Sport – The Motorsports Group full-time in 2017. After the first 5 races, Earnhardt was replaced by Landon Cassill. Joey Gase was later announced as the driver for Talladega and road course ringer Tomy Drissi was announced as the driver for Sonoma.
- On February 5, 2018, TriStar Motorsports announced that Corey LaJoie would split the chartered No. 72 team with Cole Whitt, with sponsorship from Schluter Systems. LaJoie previously drove for BK Racing's Nos. 23 and 83 in most of the races in 2017.
- On March 20, 2018, Richard Childress Racing announced that Daniel Hemric would drive a part-time No. 8 car in the Cup Series during the Richmond spring race and the during the playoffs on the new Charlotte "Roval" course.
- On August 16, 2018, Kasey Kahne announced his retirement from full-time racing following the 2018 season. After suffering from heat exhaustion at the 2018 Bojangles' Southern 500, Kahne was replaced by Regan Smith as the Leavine Family Racing No. 95 driver at the 2018 Brickyard 400. On October 9, 2018, Kahne announced that he would not continue racing for the rest of the 2018 season.

==== Crew chiefs ====
- Jeremy Bullins would move over from the No. 21 Wood Brothers Racing team to the new No. 12 Team Penske team to continue to be Ryan Blaney's crew chief.
- Greg Erwin would move from the No. 22 Team Penske team in the NASCAR Xfinity Series to the No. 21 Wood Brothers Racing team to be Paul Menard's crew chief.
- Travis Mack would move from being the car chief for the No. 88 Hendrick Motorsports team to the No. 95 Leavine Family Racing team to be Kasey Kahne's crew chief. After Michigan in June, Mack was removed and replaced by Jon Leonard in the short term.
- Championship winning crew chief Darian Grubb would be the crew chief for the No. 24 Hendrick Motorsports team and William Byron. In 2017, Grubb was the crew chief for Kasey Kahne in the final 9 races of the season after Keith Rodden left as the crew chief role.
- Bootie Barker would leave the No. 13 team at the end of the 2017 season. On November 27, 2017, Germain Racing announced that Matt Borland would move over from the No. 27 Richard Childress Racing team to be the crew chief for Ty Dillon.
- Jason Ratcliff would move over from the No. 20 Joe Gibbs Racing team to the No. 20 JGR team in the NASCAR Xfinity Series to be the crew chief for Christopher Bell. Chris Gayle would move over from the shut down No. 77 Furniture Row Racing team to continue to be Erik Jones' crew chief.
- Eddie Pardue would move with The Motorsports Group and be the crew chief. Pardue was the crew chief for the No. 33 for Circle Sport-The Motorsports Group until the two teams split after the 2017 season.
- On December 15, 2017, Tony Gibson announced his retirement. Johnny Klausmeier, who served as car chief on the No. 41 team, would be the crew chief for Aric Almirola, while Billy Scott would move from the No. 10 team to the No. 41 to be crew chief for Kurt Busch.
- On February 27, 2018, Go Fas Racing announced Randy Cox would take over crew chief duties for the No. 32 team, replacing Gene Nead.
- On October 9, 2018, Joe Gibbs Racing announced that Dave Rogers would replace Scott Graves as the crew chief of the No. 19 team.
- On November 7, 2018, NASCAR suspended Rodney Childers of the Stewart–Haas Racing No. 4 team for the last two races of the season after a post-race inspection following the team's win at Texas discovered an unapproved spoiler. He was replaced by Tony Gibson for the remainder of the season.

==== Manufacturers ====
- With the discontinuation of the SS after the 2017 model year, Chevrolet unveiled a new body style based on the Camaro ZL1.
- MBM Motorsports purchased an old Richard Petty Motorsports Ford and ran it in the Daytona 500 with Mark Thompson behind the wheel. MBM ran Chevrolets and Toyotas in 2017. MBM Motorsports would return to using Toyotas for most of the remainder of 2018 starting at Bristol with Chad Finchum.
- After running Chevrolets for the 2017 season, Rick Ware Racing announced that they would run with all three manufacturers in 2018.
- On December 7, 2017, Richard Petty Motorsports announced that they would be switching manufacturers from Ford to Chevrolet for the 2018 season. Richard Petty Motorsports ran Fords from 2010 to 2017 and last ran a General Motors car in 2000.
- BK Racing switched manufacturers from Toyota to Ford at the 2018 1000Bulbs.com 500 at Talladega before reverting to Toyota at the 2018 Hollywood Casino 400 at Kansas.
- This would be the final year of the Ford Fusion as on April 17, 2018, Ford announced the Ford Mustang as their entry in the Cup series for 2019.

== Offseason changes ==
=== Rule changes ===
During its annual media tour in November 2017, NASCAR announced that constraints would be imposed on crew rosters in its three national series. Crew members are divided into "Organizational", "Road Crew", and "Pit Crew" roles; in the Cup Series, a single team may only have a roster of 3-4 organizational crew members (depending on the number of cars they field), 12 road crew members, and 5 pit crew members (reduced from 6, as implemented in 2011). Crew members must be assigned a jersey number and a letter corresponding to their position, which must be worn on their crew uniforms. Staff may be shared between a team's individual cars, even if they are not explicitly listed on their roster. NASCAR's executive vice president and chief racing development officer Steve O'Donnell stated that these changes were intended to improve safety, as well as improve its focus on teamwork.

In February 2018, it was announced that the vehicle damage policy introduced in 2017 had been modified, following analysis of the rule's effects in 2017, and to account for the reduction in pit crew members. The length of the repair window would be extended to six minutes, and the penalty for having too many crew members repairing the car was reduced from disqualification to a two-lap penalty. Additionally, the length of the first session in qualifying on intermediate- and short-tracks would be reduced from 20 to 15 minutes.

On May 16, 2018, NASCAR announced that teams would no longer need to start the race on the tires used in qualifying, due to teams that fail to pass the inspection before qualifying getting an advantage.

== Schedule ==
The final schedule – comprising 36 races, as well as exhibition races, which are the Advance Auto Parts Clash, Can-Am Duel qualifying duel races for the Daytona 500 and the All-Star Race – was released on May 23, 2017.

No	Race title	Track	Location	Date	Time (ET)
	Advance Auto Parts Clash	Daytona International Speedway	Daytona Beach, Florida	February 11	3:00 PM
	Can-Am Duel	Daytona International Speedway	Daytona Beach, Florida	February 15	7:00 PM
1	**Daytona 500**	Daytona International Speedway	Daytona Beach, Florida	February 18	2:30 PM
2	Folds of Honor QuikTrip 500	Atlanta Motor Speedway	Hampton, Georgia	February 25	1:00 PM
3	Pennzoil 400	Las Vegas Motor Speedway	Las Vegas, Nevada	March 4	3:30 PM
4	TicketGuardian 500	ISM Raceway	Avondale, Arizona	March 11	3:30 PM
5	Auto Club 400	Auto Club Speedway	Fontana, California	March 18	3:30 PM
6	STP 500	Martinsville Speedway	Ridgeway, Virginia	March 26 (Note: The spring Martinsville race was postponed from Sunday to Monday due to snow.)	2:00 PM
7	O'Reilly Auto Parts 500	Texas Motor Speedway	Fort Worth, Texas	April 8	2:00 PM
8	Food City 500	Bristol Motor Speedway	Bristol, Tennessee	April 15–16 (Note: The spring Bristol race started Sunday and ended Monday due to rain.)	2:00 PM
9	Toyota Owners 400	Richmond Raceway	Richmond, Virginia	April 21	6:30 PM
10	GEICO 500	Talladega Superspeedway	Lincoln, Alabama	April 29	2:00 PM
11	AAA 400 Drive for Autism	Dover International Speedway	Dover, Delaware	May 6	2:00 PM
12	KC Masterpiece 400	Kansas Speedway	Kansas City, Kansas	May 12	8:00 PM
	Monster Energy Open	Charlotte Motor Speedway	Concord, North Carolina	May 19	6:00 PM
	Monster Energy NASCAR All-Star Race	Charlotte Motor Speedway	Concord, North Carolina	May 19	8:00 PM
13	**Coca-Cola 600**	Charlotte Motor Speedway	Concord, North Carolina	May 27	6:00 PM
14	Pocono 400	Pocono Raceway	Long Pond, Pennsylvania	June 3	2:00 PM
15	FireKeepers Casino 400	Michigan International Speedway	Cambridge Township, Michigan	June 10	2:00 PM
16	Toyota/Save Mart 350	Sonoma Raceway	Sonoma, California	June 24	3:00 PM
17	Overton's 400	Chicagoland Speedway	Joliet, Illinois	July 1	2:30 PM
18	Coke Zero Sugar 400	Daytona International Speedway	Daytona Beach, Florida	July 7	7:30 PM
19	Quaker State 400 presented by Walmart	Kentucky Speedway	Sparta, Kentucky	July 14	7:30 PM
20	Foxwoods Resort Casino 301	New Hampshire Motor Speedway	Loudon, New Hampshire	July 22	1:00 PM
21	Gander Outdoors 400	Pocono Raceway	Long Pond, Pennsylvania	July 29	2:30 PM
22	Go Bowling at The Glen	Watkins Glen International	Watkins Glen, New York	August 5	2:30 PM
23	Consumers Energy 400	Michigan International Speedway	Cambridge Township, Michigan	August 12	2:30 PM
24	Bass Pro Shops NRA Night Race	Bristol Motor Speedway	Bristol, Tennessee	August 18	7:30 PM
25	**Bojangles' Southern 500**	Darlington Raceway	Darlington, South Carolina	September 2	6:00 PM
26	**Big Machine Vodka 400 at the Brickyard**	Indianapolis Motor Speedway	Speedway, Indiana	September 10 (Note: The Brickyard 400 was postponed from Sunday to Monday due to rain.)	2:00 PM
Monster Energy NASCAR Cup Series Playoffs
Round of 16
27	South Point 400	Las Vegas Motor Speedway	Las Vegas, Nevada	September 16	3:00 PM
28	Federated Auto Parts 400	Richmond Raceway	Richmond, Virginia	September 22	7:30 PM
29	Bank of America Roval 400	Charlotte Motor Speedway (Roval)	Concord, North Carolina	September 30	2:00 PM
Round of 12
30	Gander Outdoors 400	Dover International Speedway, Dover, Delaware	Dover, Delaware	October 7	2:00 PM
31	1000Bulbs.com 500	Talladega Superspeedway	Lincoln, Alabama	October 14	2:00 PM
32	Hollywood Casino 400	Kansas Speedway	Kansas City, Kansas	October 21	2:00 PM
Round of 8
33	First Data 500	Martinsville Speedway	Ridgeway, Virginia	October 28	2:30 PM
34	AAA Texas 500	Texas Motor Speedway	Fort Worth, Texas	November 4	3:00 PM
35	Can-Am 500	ISM Raceway	Avondale, Arizona	November 11	2:30 PM
Championship 4
36	Ford EcoBoost 400	Homestead–Miami Speedway	Homestead, Florida	November 18	2:30 PM

Crown Jewel races in bold

=== Schedule changes ===
In 2015, NASCAR and 23 Monster Energy NASCAR Cup Series tracks agreed on a five-year contract that guarantees each track would continue to host races through 2020. Despite the agreement, Speedway Motorsports decided to transfer one of its Cup Series races at New Hampshire Motor Speedway to Las Vegas Motor Speedway to form a race weekend involving each of the three national series in the fall. On July 27, 2016, Daytona International Speedway announced that the 60th running of the Daytona 500 would be moved one week earlier to be held on February 18, 2018.

Several changes were announced with the release of the final schedule. The Big Machine Vodka 400 at the Brickyard at Indianapolis Motor Speedway moved to September to become the final race of the regular season, while the Federated Auto Parts 400 at Richmond Raceway moved to the second race in the Round of 16. The new date that Las Vegas Motor Speedway acquired from New Hampshire Motor Speedway was moved to the first race of the playoffs to replace Chicagoland Speedway, which became race 17 of the regular season. Dover International Speedway's spring race, the AAA 400 Drive for Autism, was moved one month early to precede Kansas Speedway and Charlotte Motor Speedway. The track's fall race, the Gander Outdoors 400, was moved one week later to become the first race of the Round of 12. Also, Charlotte Motor Speedway's Bank of America 500 moves one week earlier and will utilize the track's road course layout instead of its quad-oval; with the scheduled distance changing from 500 miles to 400 kilometers, the race will now be known as the Bank of America Roval 400. With an additional off-week in the schedule for 2018, the Father's Day off-week that FOX added for the U.S. Open and the 2018 FIFA World Cup will be restored, with the third off-week being after the Bristol August race.

== Season summary ==
=== Race reports ===
Speedweeks 2018

Daytona Speedweeks started with the Advance Auto Parts Clash. Austin Dillon drew the pole as Chase Elliott and Brad Keselowski led the majority of the race. Jamie McMurray crashed and Ricky Stenhouse Jr. received a penalty. Keselowski led the last half to win over Joey Logano as Jimmie Johnson crashed after contact with Kyle Larson with Chase Elliott, Kasey Kahne, Kyle Busch, and Martin Truex Jr. also getting involved.

In Daytona 500 qualifying, Alex Bowman won the pole while Denny Hamlin qualified second. Bowman won the pole for his first race since taking over the No. 88 car from Dale Earnhardt Jr. full-time. This was the fourth consecutive Daytona 500 pole won by Hendrick Motorsports.

In the Can-Am Duels on Thursday, Bowman was on pole for race one. In the early laps, Jimmie Johnson lost a tire and crashed along with Aric Almirola. Ricky Stenhouse Jr. was moving around the entire race, but got into both William Byron and David Gilliland, taking them out. Joey Logano led the majority of laps, but was passed for the lead by Ryan Blaney as Brad Keselowski crashed with Jamie McMurray, sending the race into overtime. In overtime, Blaney held off Joey Logano and Bubba Wallace to win the first Duel. In the second Duel, Hamlin was on pole. Early in the race, Erik Jones spun and collected Kyle Larson and Matt DiBenedetto. Hamlin and Chase Elliott led most of the race. Elliott led the most laps to win his second straight Duel race over Kevin Harvick.

Round 1: Daytona 500

Alex Bowman started on pole. Early on, Kyle Busch had a tire go down and had to pit. Later, Busch had another tire down and got into the wall and collected Jamie McMurray and D. J. Kennington. In the closing laps of stage one, Erik Jones spun and collected Kyle Larson, Jimmie Johnson, Daniel Suárez, William Byron, and Ty Dillon as Kurt Busch won stage one. In stage two, Byron got into the wall after having a tire go down. Brad Keselowski got into Chase Elliott and collected others including David Ragan, Kevin Harvick, Kasey Kahne, and Danica Patrick, who finished 35th in her final NASCAR race. Ryan Blaney won stage two over Joey Logano. In the final stage, Blaney continued to lead. In the closing laps, Byron again had a tire go down and spun. With two laps to go, Kurt Busch got turned around and collected Blaney, Matt DiBenedetto, Brendan Gaughan, and others, sending the race to overtime. In overtime, Aric Almirola was leading at the white flag, and tried to block Austin Dillon, but the block was late and Almirola ended up in the wall. Austin Dillon held off Bubba Wallace for his second career win and winning the Daytona 500 in the No. 3 20 years after Dale Earnhardt won his only 500 in 1998.

Round 2: Folds of Honor QuikTrip 500

Kyle Busch led the field to the green flag after an hour delay from rain. Ryan Newman jumped out to an early lead, but Busch was able to reclaim the lead. After the end-of-stage caution, Newman had a tire go down and hit the wall. Kevin Harvick led and won the first stage. In the second stage, Harvick, Kurt Busch, and Brad Keselowski all led as Keselowski won stage two after a spin by Jimmie Johnson. In the final stage, Harvick continued to dominate as Denny Hamlin and Joey Logano tried to win on a different strategy as the rest of the field. Late in the final stage, Trevor Bayne had an engine failure as Bubba Wallace plowed into Ricky Stenhouse Jr. trying to avoid the smoke. Harvick continued to lead and won over Keselowski for his first win at Atlanta since 2001.

Round 3: Pennzoil 400

Ryan Blaney started on pole. Kevin Harvick took the lead at the beginning and dominated and won the first two caution free stages. In the final stage, Jamie McMurray got into the wall after a flat tire. Kurt Busch got loose and crashed along with Chase Elliott. Harvick led over 200 laps and held off a hard charging Kyle Busch for his second straight win and second at Las Vegas.

Round 4: TicketGuardian 500

Martin Truex Jr. started on pole. Kyle Larson shot out to the lead early and led most of the first stage. Kyle Busch took the lead and won the first stage. Early in the second stage, Larson spun on the apron. Chris Buescher had a tire go down and got into the wall. Kurt Busch stayed out and won the second stage. Denny Hamlin took the lead as Paul Menard had a tire go down and got into the wall. Kyle Busch regained the lead until green flag pit stops. Brad Keselowski stayed out to stretch it out until the end, but had to pit. Kevin Harvick was able to pass Chase Elliott during the green flag cycle to take the lead from Ryan Newman and hold off Kyle Busch for his third consecutive win and ninth at Phoenix.

Round 5: Auto Club 400

Martin Truex Jr. started on pole for the second straight week. Early, Kevin Harvick got into the wall and spun through the grass after contact with Kyle Larson, ending his chances for a fourth straight win. Truex was able to win the first stage and win the second stage after Trevor Bayne got into the wall. David Ragan brought out the final caution as Truex was able to beat out Kyle Busch on pit stops and pulled away from Larson to sweep all three stages to win.

Round 6: STP 500

Martin Truex Jr. started on pole for the third straight week as qualifying was cancelled due to rain and snow. The race was postponed from Sunday to Monday due to snow. Denny Hamlin won the first stage after a Competition Caution and Ryan Blaney won the second stage. Jamie McMurray spun after contact with Austin Dillon. Clint Bowyer took the lead from Blaney and dominated the remainder of the race, leading 215 laps. McMurray, Trevor Bayne, and Harrison Rhodes all had tires go down, but there was no caution. Bowyer held off Kyle Busch for his first win since 2012 and the fourth out of six races for Stewart–Haas Racing.

Round 7: O'Reilly Auto Parts 500

Kurt Busch started on pole after qualifying was cancelled just after the first round due to rain. As soon as the race began, Alex Bowman spun and collected Aric Almirola, Austin Dillon, and Paul Menard. At the end of the first stage, Martin Truex Jr. had a tire go down and got into the wall as Kevin Harvick scored the stage win as it ended under caution. In the second stage, Kyle Larson had a tire go down and he got into the wall. Kyle Busch was able to win the second stage. Early in the final stage, Denny Hamlin spun and collected David Ragan, Brad Keselowski, and Jimmie Johnson. Menard and Ryan Newman both got into the wall. Kyle Busch and Harvick, both with older tires, were able to stay out front and Busch was able to hold Harvick off for his first win of the year and third at Texas.

Round 8: Food City 500

Kyle Busch started on pole. Michael McDowell spun on the third lap and collected others including Chase Elliott and Martin Truex Jr. The race was stopped three different times due to rain and a wreck by Trevor Bayne. Ryan Blaney led most of the first half of the race, but was caught up in an accident while leading, ending his race. Brad Keselowski won the first stage. After another red flag due to rain, the remainder of the race was postponed to Monday. After a small delay due to rain, the race continued. Keselowski would win the second stage after taking back the lead. Kyle Larson took back the lead and continued leading until spun after making contact with Ryan Newman. Kyle Busch got the lead when the caution was displayed for rain, but it was a brief yellow. On the final restart, Larson got back in the lead, but Kyle Busch passed Larson for the lead with six laps to go and Busch pulled away to his second straight win and seventh at Bristol.

Round 9: Toyota Owners 400

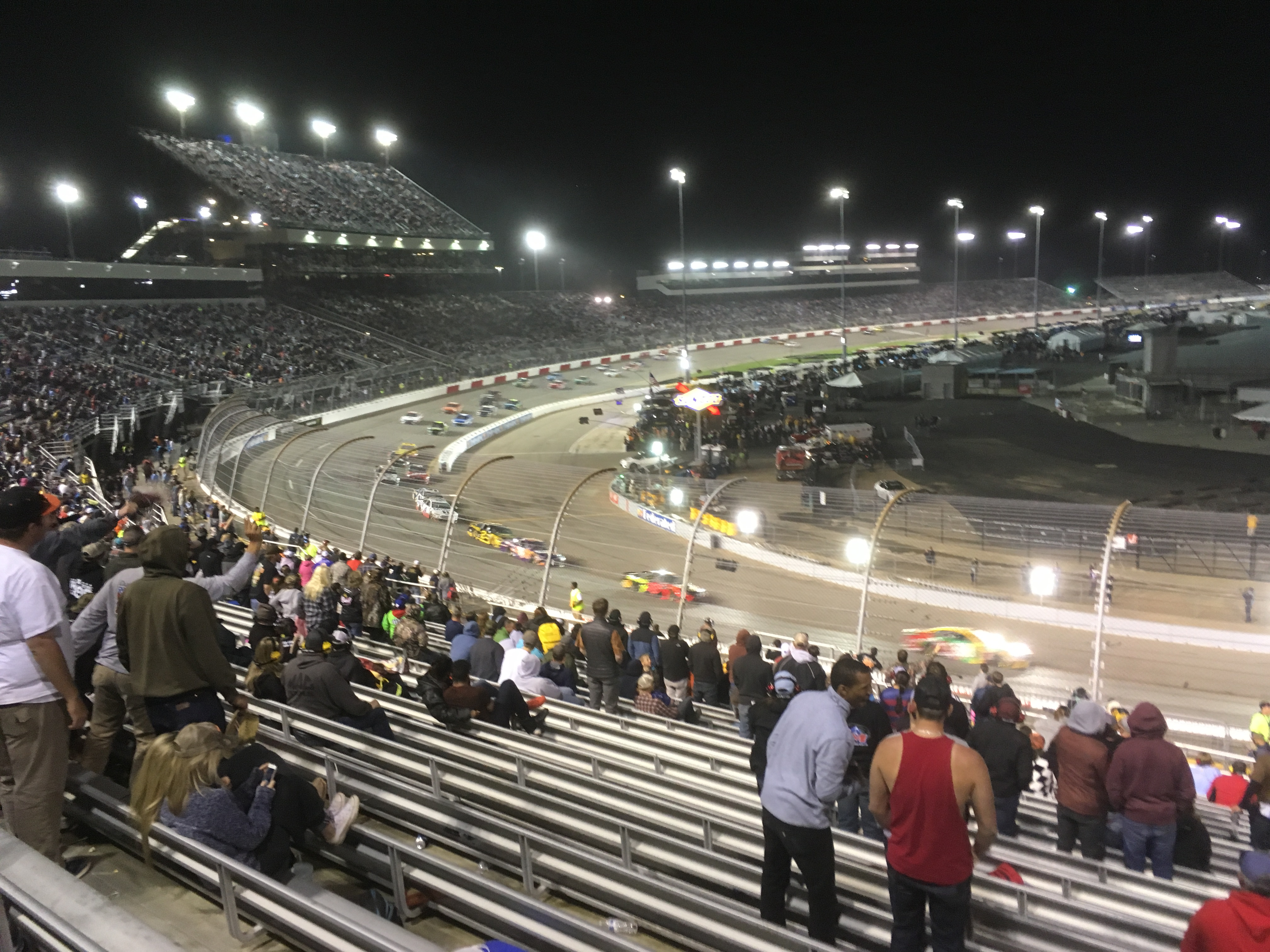
Kyle Busch leading late in the Toyota Owners 400 at Richmond Raceway in April

Martin Truex Jr. won the pole. Joey Logano dominated the early part of the race, winning both stages. Kurt Busch and Clint Bowyer took turned swapping the lead. Truex regained the lead and lead a race high of 121 laps. Ryan Blaney and Ricky Stenhouse Jr. got together and spun. Jamie McMurray got into the wall and made contact with Ryan Newman, who blew up. David Ragan had a tire go down and got into the wall. Stenhouse spun again to send the race into overtime. On the restart, Kyle Busch held off Chase Elliott for his third straight win and fifth at Richmond.

Round 10: GEICO 500

Kevin Harvick started the race from the pole. Brad Keselowski won the first stage of the race. In the second stage, Erik Jones caused a multicar wreck that collected Jamie McMurray, Kyle Larson, Martin Truex Jr., and Trevor Bayne. Paul Menard won the second stage of the race. Numerous drivers experienced speeding penalties on pit road including Denny Hamlin, who was caught speeding on pit road multiple times. Late in the race, Jimmie Johnson got loose in front of teammate William Byron and caused a 14-car accident that also collected Keselowski, Menard, Clint Bowyer, Michael McDowell, Ryan Blaney, Bubba Wallace, and A. J. Allmendinger. Joey Logano led in the closing laps of the race and went to score his first win of the season, ending a 36 race winless streak.

Round 11: AAA 400 Drive for Autism

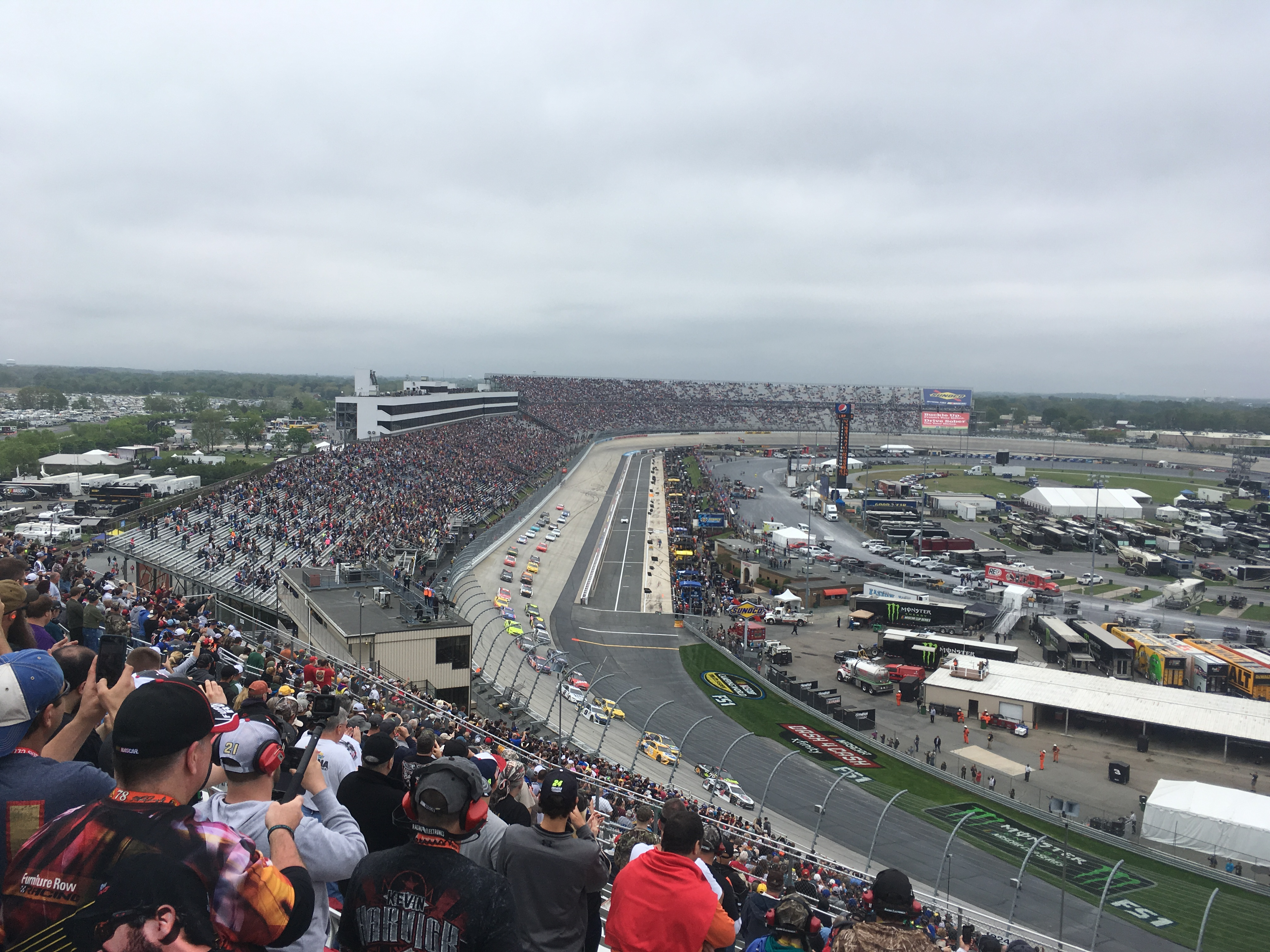
Kevin Harvick leading on the first lap of the AAA 400 Drive for Autism at Dover International Speedway in May

Kyle Larson started on pole. Michael McDowell spun and Derrike Cope crashed early as Kevin Harvick won both stages. Kyle Busch went to the garage after suffering a broken driveshaft. Clint Bowyer was leading when the race was halted by a red flag due to rain. After the delay, Kevin Harvick passed Bowyer for the lead and pulled away for his second win at Dover and his fourth win of the season.

Round 12: KC Masterpiece 400

Kevin Harvick started on pole. Harvick led early, but Ryan Blaney took the lead and won the first stage. Kyle Larson came from the rear of the field to dominate the race, winning the second stage. Alex Bowman and Daniel Suárez got together and both got into the wall. Larson and Blaney got into each other, putting Blaney in the wall. On the restart, William Byron had a tire go down caused a wreck featuring Clint Bowyer, Ryan Newman, Ty Dillon, Jamie McMurray, Chris Buescher, and Matt Kenseth, competing in his first race of the year, bringing out the red flag. On the restart, Martin Truex Jr. pulled away from the field, but Kevin Harvick was able run down Truex to take the lead for his second consecutive win and his fifth of the season.

Exhibition: Monster Energy NASCAR All-Star Race

First, it was the Monster Energy Open. Aric Almirola started on pole due to qualifying being rained out. Almirola led early, but Alex Bowman took the lead and won the first stage to transfer. In the second stage, Paul Menard got into the wall. Chase Elliott had the lead, but Daniel Suárez took the lead and won the second stage to transfer. Bubba Wallace led in the final stage, but Elliott got back into the lead. Alimrola and Erik Jones got into each other as A. J. Allmendinger took the lead and held off Eliott to win his second Open to transfer. Chase Eliott won the fan vote to transfer for the third straight year.

Matt Kenseth won the pole for the race. Kurt Busch spun early as Kevin Harvick won the first stage and Kyle Busch won the second stage. In the third stage, Kasey Kahne got into the wall. Martin Truex Jr. got into Clint Bowyer and they crashed with Kurt Busch, Kyle Busch, and Brad Keselowski. Harvick got by Daniel Suárez to win the third stage. In the final 10 laps, Harvick was out front as Kyle Larson spun after contact with Joey Logano. In a two lap shootout, Kevin Harvick held off Daniel Suárez for his second All-Star Race win and the $1 million.

Round 13: Coca-Cola 600

Kyle Busch started on pole. Defending winner Austin Dillon got in the wall after having a tire go down early. Kevin Harvick got into the wall, taking him out of the race, as Busch won the first stage. William Byron had a tire go down and got into the wall. Jimmie Johnson spun after contact with Denny Hamlin and also sent Joey Logano spinning. Busch won the second stage. In the third stage, Gray Gaulding crashed and Chris Buescher spun. Kyle Larson spun and Ryan Blaney blew an engine and caught fire. Busch won the third stage. Kyle Busch continued to dominate and won his fourth race of the season and with the win, he became the first in history to win a race at every racetrack in the MENCS that he competed at.

Round 14: Pocono 400

Defending race winner Ryan Blaney started on pole. Blaney led early until he had a problem and had to pit. Martin Truex Jr. got the lead and won the first stage. Kevin Harvick got to the lead and dominated to win a caution free stage two. In the final stage, Matt DiBenedetto had brake issues and it caused a tire to catch fire as Kasey Kahne and Bubba Wallace both had transmission issues. Derrike Cope spun after contact with Kyle Larson and Denny Hamlin spun and crashed into the wall after contact with Alex Bowman. On the restart, Erik Jones spun after contact with Joey Logano. On the restart, Martin Truex Jr. pulled away from Larson, Harvick, and Kyle Busch to pick up his second win of the season and second at Pocono.

Round 15: FireKeepers Casino 400

Kurt Busch started on pole. The race started over two hours late due to rain. Austin Dillon and Ricky Stenhouse Jr. spun after making contact with each other just as the competition caution came out. David Ragan got into the wall after contact with Bubba Wallace Matt Kenseth spun at the end of the stage as Ryan Blaney, who had taken the lead from Kurt Busch, won the first stage. Daniel Suárez spun after contact with Paul Menard. Kyle Larson, who won the last three Michigan races, spun into the grass, ending his changes of a fourth straight win. Kevin Harvick won the second stage over his teammates. Clint Bowyer had taken the lead from Harvick as Ricky Stenhouse Jr. spun as rain was reported around the track. The race was called giving Bowyer his second win of the season.

Round 16: Toyota/Save Mart 350

Kyle Larson started on pole. Erik Jones had problems early as Martin Truex Jr. led most of the first stage, but pitted allowing A. J. Allmendinger to win the stage. On the restart, Allmendinger blew an engine while Jamie McMurray went to the garage with low oil pressure. Denny Hamlin won the second stage by staying out while others pitted. Ryan Blaney had to make several stops to fix damage. Kevin Harvick had the lead late until he decided to pit in case of a late caution. Truex stayed out during green flag pit stops and won his third win of the season and second at Sonoma with a ten-second lead over Harvick.

Round 17: Overton's 400

Paul Menard started the race on pole. Clint Bowyer led early in the race before getting two speeding penalties on pit road. Aric Almirola won Stage 1 and led the most laps the race, but had to pit under green for a loose wheel. Kevin Harvick won Stage 2 of the race. Harvick would continue to lead until losing it to Kyle Busch during a round of pit stops under caution. Kyle Busch continued to lead in the closing laps as Kyle Larson was catching him. Larson caught up to Kyle Busch on the final lap and the two made contact twice, with Kyle Busch holding on to win the race with Larson finishing second.

Round 18: Coke Zero Sugar 400

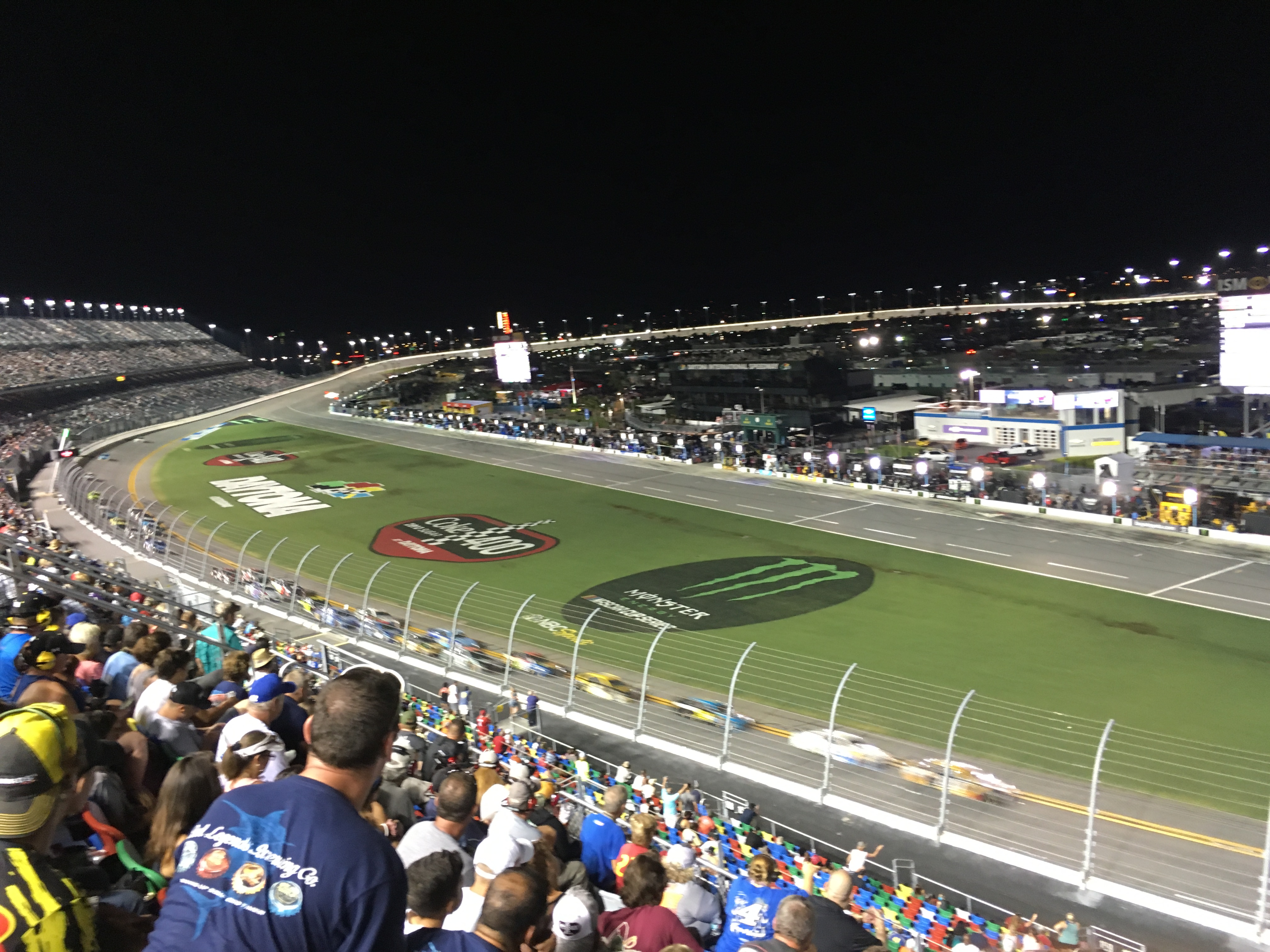
Clint Bowyer leading during the final stage of the Coke Zero Sugar 400 at Daytona International Speedway in July

Chase Elliott started on pole. Ricky Stenhouse Jr. dominated by winning both stages. In the second stage, Paul Menard got turned and into the grass. Brad Keselowski got turned around and collected Kurt Busch, Joey Logano, Ryan Blaney, Denny Hamlin, Elliott, and others. Kyle Busch got turned into William Byron and also involved Jamie McMurray. In the final stage, Kyle Larson got turned into Stenhouse. Jimmie Johnson was leading until he received a penalty on pit road. Stenhouse had a tire go down and spun, ending his chance of back-to-back wins. On the restart, Aric Almirola lost a wheel and crashed along with Michael McDowell and Johnson. In overtime, Kevin Harvick took the lead from Kasey Kahne, but Clint Bowyer spun and collected Harvick, Brendan Gaughan, and others. On the second restart of overtime, Erik Jones drove past Martin Truex Jr. to score his first career win and became the seventh different winner of the season.

Round 19: Quaker State 400

Martin Truex Jr. started on pole. Truex dominated by leading the most laps and winning both stages. Alex Bowman had a tire go down and got into the wall and J. J. Yeley lost an engine. Teammates Jamie McMurray and Kyle Larson suffered mechanical problems. Truex pulled away from a charging Ryan Blaney for his fourth win of the season and second straight at Kentucky.

Round 20: Foxwoods Resort Casino 301

Kurt Busch started on pole. The start of the race was delayed due to rain. Busch dominated the majority of the race. A. J. Allmendinger got into the wall, ending his day. Martin Truex Jr. took the lead after the Competition Caution and won the first stage. Chase Elliott took the lead from Truex to win the second stage. Clint Bowyer got into the wall and went to the garage. Kyle Busch had the lead late, but Kevin Harvick moved Busch to take the lead and get his sixth win of the season and third at New Hampshire.

Round 21: Gander Outdoors 400

Kevin Harvick originally won the pole. Thirteen cars including Harvick failed post-qualifying inspection, disallowing their times and forcing them to start in the back, thus Daniel Suárez won the pole. Chase Elliott won the first stage while Harvick won the second stage. A few had tire problems including Kurt Busch, Joey Logano, and Brad Keselowski. Keselowski got into the wall, sending him to the garage. Bubba Wallace lost his brakes and hit the wall hard at a high speed, resulting in a red flag. On the restart, Aric Almirola spun after contact with Matt DiBenedetto, sending the race to overtime. Kyle Busch pulled away to hold off Suárez for his sixth win of the season and second at Pocono.

Round 22: Go Bowling at The Glen

Denny Hamlin started on pole. Aric Almirola got into the wall early and Joey Logano spun and went to the garage. Martin Truex Jr. won the first stage. Chase Elliott dominated the second half of the race and won the second stage. Ryan Newman spun and Jimmie Johnson spun after contact with A. J. Allmendinger. Martin Truex Jr. caught Elliott, but ran out of fuel, which allowed Chase Elliott to get his first career win and the 250th win for Hendrick Motorsports.

Round 23: Consumers Energy 400

Denny Hamlin started on pole for the second straight week. Erik Jones spun early and William Byron spun and got into the wall along with Martin Truex Jr. Kevin Harvick dominated and won both stages. Jones spun again and Ty Dillon ran over a battery and got into the wall and caught fire. Harvick took the lead from Jamie McMurray and held off Brad Keselowski for his seventh win of the season.

Round 24: Bass Pro Shops NRA Night Race

Kyle Larson started on pole. Kyle Busch spun and caused a pile up on the frontstretch, including Bubba Wallace. Paul Menard got into the wall while running up front as Ryan Blaney edged Kevin Harvick to win the first stage. Blaney, Joey Logano, Chase Elliott, Clint Bowyer, and others led up front. Logano won the second stage. Aric Almirola had mechanical problems that sent him to the garage. Martin Truex Jr. spun and crashed along with J. J. Yeley after getting into Kyle Busch. Busch and Brad Keselowski had tires go down and both spun. Kurt Busch was able to take the lead from Clint Bowyer and held off Kyle Larson for his first win of the season and sixth at Bristol.

Round 25: Bojangles' Southern 500

Denny Hamlin started on pole. Jimmie Johnson had fuel pump problems, sending him to the garage. Kyle Larson dominated and won both stages and led the most laps. Clint Bowyer got into the back of Ryan Newman, who slowed down to go to pit road. William Byron had the engine blew, sending him to the garage. Brad Keselowski beat out Kyle Larson on pit road and pulled away from teammate Joey Logano for his first win of the season.

Round 26: Big Machine Vodka 400 at the Brickyard

Kyle Busch started on pole after qualifying was cancelled due to rain. The race was postponed from Sunday to Monday due to rain. The race had two competition cautions at the beginning due to the rain. Martin Truex Jr. was sent to the garage early after a rotor exploded causing front end damage to the car. Clint Bowyer was able to win the first stage. Bubba Wallace spun and collided with David Starr. A. J. Allmendinger and Alex Bowman both wrecked off turn two. Matt Kenseth was able to win the second stage. In the final stage Clint Bowyer dominated and Denny Hamlin was able to grab the lead after the final round of green flag pit stops cycled through and was heading to the win until Landon Cassill wrecked along with Jeffrey Earnhardt. On the restart, Brad Keselowski, who had fresher tires, was able to take the lead from Hamlin and hold off Erik Jones for his second straight win and the first Brickyard 400 victory for Roger Penske and the first Brickyard win for Ford since 1999. Kyle Busch went on to capture the Regular-Season Championship over Kevin Harvick and the final two playoff spots went to Jimmie Johnson and Alex Bowman.

Round 27: South Point 400

Erik Jones started on pole. Kyle Larson had to make an unscheduled pit stop early for a flat right front tire. Martin Truex Jr. would grab the first stage. In the second stage, Kevin Harvick blew a tire and slammed the wall in turn 1 collecting polesitter Jones in the process. Brad Keselowski would win the second stage. The final stage had a number of wrecks that puts some playoff drivers in jeopardy, with Jamie McMurray wrecked in turn three hard collecting Chase Elliott as well. Kyle Busch later spun in turn four as well as Denny Hamlin later on in the same spot, but would suffer splitter damage ending his day. A late race restart caused Jimmie Johnson, Alex Bowman, and Kurt Busch to suffer tire rubs after contact in the back-straightaway. Joey Logano hit the wall late in turn two to bring out a caution with just a few laps remaining for an overtime restart. Keselowski would have great restart, but a multi-car wreck in turn four involving Michael McDowell, Kurt Busch, Matt DiBenedetto, and David Ragan, forcing another attempt. On the second attempt, Keselowski would go on to win the race over Larson to advance to the second round for his third win in a row as well as Team Penske's 500th win overall.

Round 28: Federated Auto Parts 400

Kevin Harvick started on pole. Denny Hamlin was spun by Ricky Stenhouse Jr., but was able to save it. Martin Truex Jr. dominated and won both stages, but an uncontrolled tire sent him to the back of the field. Matt Kenseth and Jeffrey Earnhardt go into each other, which sent Earnhardt in the wall. Kyle Busch was able to take the lead from Brad Keselowski and held off Harvick to advance to the next round of the playoffs for his seventh win of the season and his 50th career win overall.

Round 29: Bank of America Roval 400

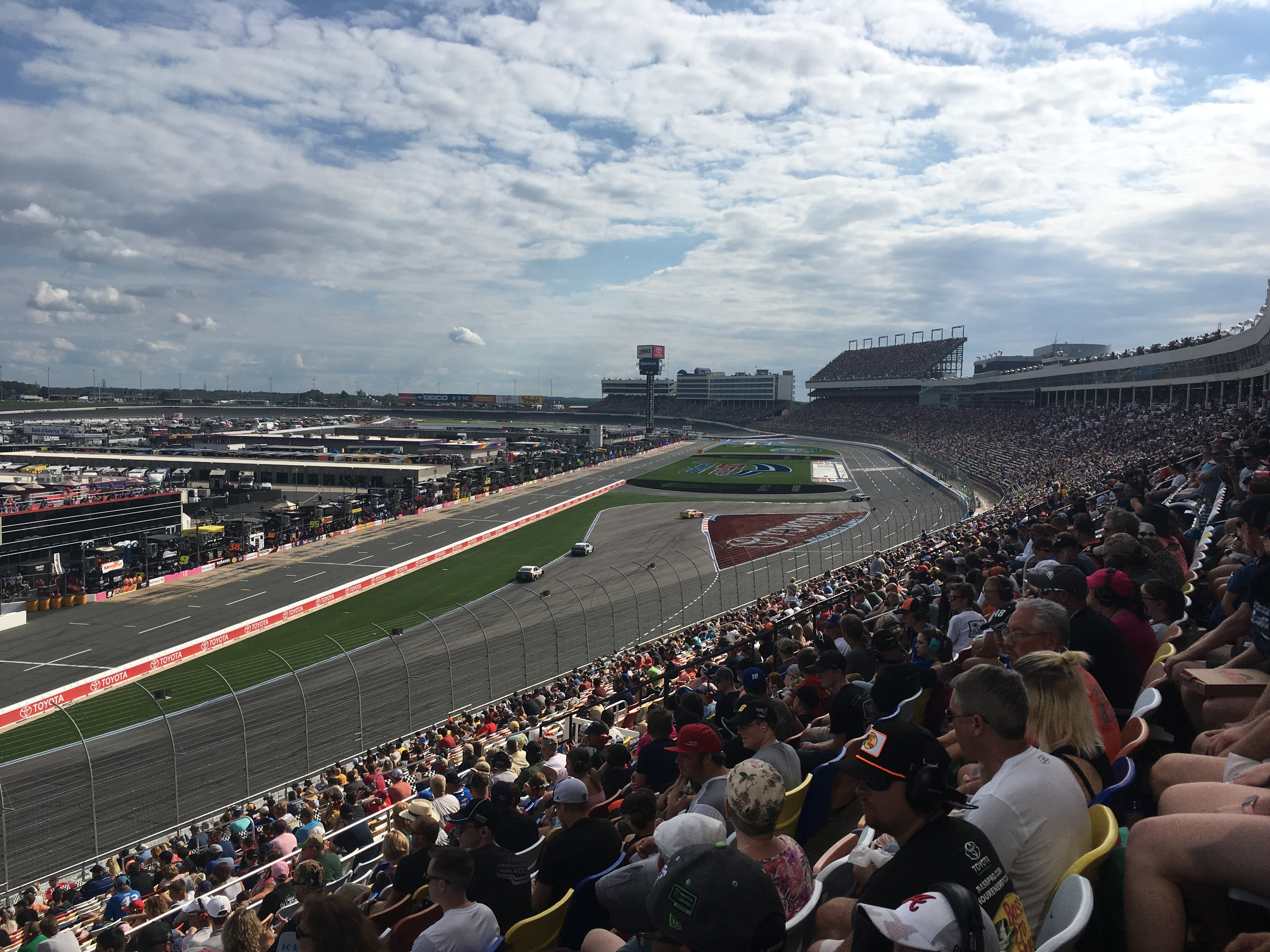
Kyle Larson leading during the second stage of the Bank of America Roval 400 at Charlotte Motor Speedway in September

Kurt Busch started on pole. Kyle Larson won stage one while Ryan Blaney won the second stage. Austin Dillon slammed the wall twice and got sent to the garage to end his playoff hopes. Aric Almirola and Chris Buescher spun and Ricky Stenhouse Jr. slammed the wall. At the end, leader Brad Keselowski lost control of his car on a restart and crashed into the wall along with Larson, Paul Menard, Kyle Busch, Daniel Hemric, Bubba Wallace, and others. Martin Truex Jr. and Jimmie Johnson were racing for the win until Johnson spun in the chicane and collected Truex. Ryan Blaney snuck through to win over Jamie McMurray for his second career win and advance in the playoffs. Dillon, Denny Hamlin, Erik Jones, and Johnson were eliminated.

Round 30: Gander Outdoors 400

Kyle Busch started on pole after qualifying was rained out. Jimmie Johnson had to go to the garage before the race and eventually returned to the race several laps down. Kevin Harvick took the lead and dominated, leading 286 laps and winning both stages. Harvick had trouble on pit road and fell back. Aric Almirola was heading to the win, but Clint Bowyer got into the wall. Almirola wrecked on the restart along with Brad Keselowski, Alex Bowman, Ryan Blaney, and Martin Truex Jr. In overtime, Chase Elliott held off Denny Hamlin to advance to the next round with his second win of the year and the second of his career.

Round 31: 1000Bulbs.com 500

Kurt Busch started on pole with all Stewart–Haas Racing drivers starting first through fourth. SHR dominated the race with Busch leading the most laps and winning stage one. Jimmie Johnson spun and hit the wall and Kyle Larson had a tire go down and spun. Kevin Harvick won the second stage. Jamie McMurray spun and got stuck in the grass. Late in the race, Alex Bowman got into the wall and collected J. J. Yeley and William Byron, which sent the race to overtime. Harvick, Ryan Blaney, and Brad Keselowski ran out of fuel before the restart. Matt DiBenedetto spun and collected several cars, but the race remained green. Kurt Busch ran out of fuel and it allowed teammate Aric Almirola to take the lead and hold off teammate Clint Bowyer to advance in the Round of 8 for his second career win and becoming the fourth SHR driver to win during the season.

Round 32: Hollywood Casino 400

Joey Logano started on pole. Daniel Suárez got into the wall as Bubba Wallace had a tire go down and William Byron suffered a blown engine with Logano winning the first stage. Kevin Harvick won the second stage and was leading when he got a speeding penalty on pit road. Chase Elliott was able to hold off Kyle Busch for his third win and his second in the "Round of 12". Brad Keselowski, Ryan Blaney, Kyle Larson, and Alex Bowman were eliminated from the playoffs.

Round 33: First Data 500

Kyle Busch started on pole. Jimmie Johnson spun after contact with Erik Jones as Denny Hamlin won the first stage. Joey Logano dominated the race and won the second stage. William Byron was spun on pit road after contact with Clint Bowyer. Kyle Larson had the engine blow and Timmy Hill had an electrical fire. Clint Bowyer made contact with Johnson and spun. Martin Truex Jr. took the lead from Logano, but Logano was able to pull the bump-and-run on Truex and held off Hamlin for his second win of the season and clinched a spot in the "Championship 4."

Round 34: AAA Texas 500

Ryan Blaney started on pole. William Byron spun after contact with teammate Jimmie Johnson. Kevin Harvick dominated by leading the most laps and winning both stages. Matt DiBenedetto made contact with Martin Truex Jr. and got into the wall. Joey Gase spun and collected Daniel Suárez, sending the race into overtime. Harvick held off Blaney to lock into the "Championship 4" for his eighth win of the season and second Playoff race at Texas. Due to an altered spoiler discovered post-race, Harvick had his win encumbered, was penalized 40 points, and was no longer locked into the Championship 4.

Round 35: Can-Am 500

Kevin Harvick started on pole. Harvick led all of the first stage until he had a flat tire and had to pit allowing Chase Elliott to win the first stage. Joey Logano had a tire go down and sent him to the garage. Clint Bowyer had a tire go down and got into the wall, ending his championship hopes. Ricky Stenhouse Jr. hit the wall and caught fire. Denny Hamlin got loose and collected Kurt Busch, Elliott, and others. Alex Bowman got into the wall and caught fire. Kyle Busch, who won the second stage, dominated the race and held off Brad Keselowski for his eighth win of the season and locking into the "Championship 4" along with Logano, Harvick, and Martin Truex Jr. while Elliott, Aric Almirola, Bowyer, and Kurt Busch were eliminated.

Round 36: Ford EcoBoost 400

Denny Hamlin started on pole. The Championship 4 dominated the race with Kevin Harvick winning the first stage. Kyle Larson won the second stage after passing Harvick at the line. Larson got into the wall after having a tire go down. Erik Jones and Chris Buescher both had flat tires, but got to pit road before a caution. Daniel Suárez got into the wall after contact with Brad Keselowski. Joey Logano, who led the most laps, took the lead from Martin Truex Jr. and pulled away from his third win of the season and winning the Monster Energy NASCAR Cup Series Championship.

== Results and standings ==
=== Race results ===
No.	Race	Pole position	Most laps led	Winning driver	Manufacturer	Report
	Advance Auto Parts Clash	Austin Dillon	Brad Keselowski	Brad Keselowski	Ford	Report
	Can-Am Duel 1	Alex Bowman	Joey Logano	Ryan Blaney	Ford	Report
	Can-Am Duel 2	Denny Hamlin	Chase Elliott	Chase Elliott	Chevrolet	Report
1	Daytona 500	Alex Bowman	Ryan Blaney	Austin Dillon	Chevrolet	Report
2	Folds of Honor QuikTrip 500	Kyle Busch	Kevin Harvick	Kevin Harvick	Ford	Report
3	Pennzoil 400	Ryan Blaney	Kevin Harvick	Kevin Harvick	Ford	Report
4	TicketGuardian 500	Martin Truex Jr.	Kyle Busch	Kevin Harvick	Ford	Report
5	Auto Club 400	Martin Truex Jr.	Martin Truex Jr.	Martin Truex Jr.	Toyota	Report
6	STP 500	Martin Truex Jr.	Clint Bowyer	Clint Bowyer	Ford	Report
7	O'Reilly Auto Parts 500	Kurt Busch	Kyle Busch	Kyle Busch	Toyota	Report
8	Food City 500	Kyle Busch	Kyle Larson	Kyle Busch	Toyota	Report
9	Toyota Owners 400	Martin Truex Jr.	Martin Truex Jr.	Kyle Busch	Toyota	Report
10	GEICO 500	Kevin Harvick	Joey Logano	Joey Logano	Ford	Report
11	AAA 400 Drive for Autism	Kyle Larson	Kevin Harvick	Kevin Harvick	Ford	Report
12	KC Masterpiece 400	Kevin Harvick	Kyle Larson	Kevin Harvick	Ford	Report
	Monster Energy Open	Aric Almirola	Daniel Suárez	A. J. Allmendinger	Chevrolet	Report
	Monster Energy NASCAR All-Star Race	Matt Kenseth	Kevin Harvick	Kevin Harvick	Ford	Report
13	Coca-Cola 600	Kyle Busch	Kyle Busch	Kyle Busch	Toyota	Report
14	Pocono 400	Ryan Blaney	Kevin Harvick	Martin Truex Jr.	Toyota	Report
15	FireKeepers Casino 400	Kurt Busch	Kevin Harvick	Clint Bowyer	Ford	Report
16	Toyota/Save Mart 350	Kyle Larson	Martin Truex Jr.	Martin Truex Jr.	Toyota	Report
17	Overton's 400	Paul Menard	Aric Almirola	Kyle Busch	Toyota	Report
18	Coke Zero Sugar 400	Chase Elliott	Ricky Stenhouse Jr.	Erik Jones	Toyota	Report
19	Quaker State 400	Martin Truex Jr.	Martin Truex Jr.	Martin Truex Jr.	Toyota	Report
20	Foxwoods Resort Casino 301	Kurt Busch	Kurt Busch	Kevin Harvick	Ford	Report
21	Gander Outdoors 400	Daniel Suárez	Kyle Busch	Kyle Busch	Toyota	Report
22	Go Bowling at The Glen	Denny Hamlin	Chase Elliott	Chase Elliott	Chevrolet	Report
23	Consumers Energy 400	Denny Hamlin	Kevin Harvick	Kevin Harvick	Ford	Report
24	Bass Pro Shops NRA Night Race	Kyle Larson	Ryan Blaney	Kurt Busch	Ford	Report
25	Bojangles' Southern 500	Denny Hamlin	Kyle Larson	Brad Keselowski	Ford	Report
26	Big Machine Vodka 400 at the Brickyard	Kyle Busch	Clint Bowyer; Denny Hamlin	Brad Keselowski	Ford	Report
Monster Energy NASCAR Cup Series Playoffs
Round of 16
27	South Point 400	Erik Jones	Martin Truex Jr.	Brad Keselowski	Ford	Report
28	Federated Auto Parts 400	Kevin Harvick	Martin Truex Jr.	Kyle Busch	Toyota	Report
29	Bank of America Roval 400	Kurt Busch	Kyle Larson	Ryan Blaney	Ford	Report
Round of 12
30	Gander Outdoors 400	Kyle Busch	Kevin Harvick	Chase Elliott	Chevrolet	Report
31	1000Bulbs.com 500	Kurt Busch	Kurt Busch	Aric Almirola	Ford	Report
32	Hollywood Casino 400	Joey Logano	Joey Logano	Chase Elliott	Chevrolet	Report
Round of 8
33	First Data 500	Kyle Busch	Joey Logano	Joey Logano	Ford	Report
34	AAA Texas 500	Ryan Blaney	Kevin Harvick	Kevin Harvick	Ford	Report
35	Can-Am 500	Kevin Harvick	Kyle Busch	Kyle Busch	Toyota	Report
Championship 4
36	Ford EcoBoost 400	Denny Hamlin	Joey Logano	Joey Logano	Ford	Report

=== Drivers' Championship ===
(key) Bold – Pole position awarded by time. Italics – Pole position set by final practice results or owner's points. * – Most laps led. ^{1} – Stage 1 winner. ^{2} – Stage 2 winner. ^{3} – Stage 3 winner. (Note: Stage 3 Winner only for Coca-Cola 600.) ^{1–10} - Regular season top 10 finishers.

. – Eliminated after Round of 16 . – Eliminated after Round of 12 . – Eliminated after Round of 8

Pos.	Driver	DAY	ATL	LVS	PHO	CAL	MAR	TEX	BRI	RCH	TAL	DOV	KAN	CLT	POC	MCH	SON	CHI	DAY	KEN	NHA	POC	GLN	MCH	BRI	DAR	IND	LVS	RCH	ROV	DOV	TAL	KAN	MAR	TEX	PHO	HOM	Pts.	Stage	Bonus
1	Joey Logano	4	6	7	19	5	6	6	9	4^{12}	1*	13	3	22	9	7	19	8	39	10	9	26	37	10	4^{2}	2	13	4	14	10	3	5	**8***^{1}	1*^{2}	3	37	1*	5040	–	15^{5}
2	Martin Truex Jr.	18	5	4	**5**	**1***^{12}	4	37	30	**14***	26	4	2	2	1^{1}	18	1*	4	2	**1***^{12}	4^{1}	15	2^{1}	14	30	11	40	3*^{1}	3*^{12}	14	15	23	5	3	9	14	2	5035	–	38^{3}
3	Kevin Harvick	31	1*^{1}	1*^{12}	1	35	5	2^{1}	7	5	4	1*^{12}	**1**	40	4*^{2}	2*^{2}	2	3^{2}	19	5	1	4^{2}	10	1*^{12}	10	4	4	39	**2**	9	6*^{12}	28^{2}	12^{2}	10	1*^{12}	**5**	3^{1}	5034	–	54^{2}
4	Kyle Busch	25	**7**	2	2*^{1}	3	2	1*^{2}	**1**	1	13	35	10	**1***^{123}	3	4	5	1	33	4	2	1*	3	3	20	7	8	7	1	32	8	26	2	**4**	17	1*^{2}	4	5033	–	55^{1}
Monster Energy NASCAR Cup Series Playoffs cut-off
Pos.	Driver	DAY	ATL	LVS	PHO	CAL	MAR	TEX	BRI	RCH	TAL	DOV	KAN	CLT	POC	MCH	SON	CHI	DAY	KEN	NHA	POC	GLN	MCH	BRI	DAR	IND	LVS	RCH	ROV	DOV	TAL	KAN	MAR	TEX	PHO	HOM	Pts.	Stage	Bonus
5	Aric Almirola	11	13	10	7	12	14	32	6	17	7	11	9	13	7	11	8	25*^{1}	27	8	3	25	22	7	31	14	23	6	5	19	13	1	10	11	8	4	9	2354	60	6
6	Chase Elliott	33	10	34	3	16	9	11	29	2	3	12	12	11	10	9	4	19	**34**	13	5^{2}	7^{1}	1*^{2}	9	3	5	15	36	4	6	1	31	1	7	6	23^{1}	7	2350	74	18
7	Kurt Busch	26^{1}	8	35	10^{2}	14	11	**7**	22	11	2	5	8	8	19	**3**	6	17	37	6	**8***	9	9	6	1	6	6	21	18	**5**	5	**14***^{1}	18	6	7	32	10	2350	101	15^{4}
8	Brad Keselowski	32	2^{2}	6	15	4	10	33	23^{12}	8	33^{1}	6	14	4	5	6	13	9	36	3	32	38	17	2	16	1	1	1^{2}	9	31	14	27	6	5	12	2	5	2343	56	25^{6}
9	Kyle Larson	19	9	3	18	2	16	36	2*	7	40	**10**	4*^{2}	7	2	28	**14**	2	29	9	12	23	6	17	**2**	3*^{12}	14	2	7	25*^{1}	12	11	3	37	5	3	13^{2}	2299	50	6^{8}
10	Ryan Blaney	7*^{2}	12	**5**	16	8	3^{2}	5	35	22	18	8	37^{1}	36	**6**	8^{1}	34	18	40	2	7	12	12	5	7*^{1}	15	11	5	19	1^{2}	11	29	7	20	**2**	34	17	2298	76	13^{9}
11	Denny Hamlin	3	4	17	4	6	12^{1}	34	14	3	14	7	5	3	35	12	10^{2}	7	38	16	13	10	**13**	**8**	14	**10**	3*	32	16	12	2	4	14	2^{1}	30	13	**12**	2285	49	3^{10}
12	Clint Bowyer	15	3	18	6	11	1*	9	8	9	31	2	15	12	20	1	3	5	22	12	35	11	11	12	6	36	5*^{1}	23	10	3	35	2	13	21	26	35	8	2272	63	15^{7}
13	Austin Dillon	1	14	13	17	10	30	26	15	15	35	26	17	34	12	14	16	37	9	22	21	13	27	4	13	16	22	11	6	39	7	17	11	30	10	8	11	2245	17	5
14	Jimmie Johnson	38	27	12	14	9	15	35	3	6	12	9	19	5	8	20	11	14	23	14	10	17	30	28	9	39	16	22	8	8	36	7	22	12	15	15	14	2242	26	–
15	Erik Jones	36	11	8	9	7	17	4	26	13	39	18	7	19	29	15	7	6	1	7	16	5	5	13	5	8	2	**40**	11	30	4	8	4	26	4	17	27	2220	32	5
16	Alex Bowman	**17**	20	16	13	13	7	28	5	18	8	23	18	9	27	16	9	10	10	39	11	3	14	19	8	23	33	19	12	4	28	33	9	17	14	30	29	2204	27	–
17	Ryan Newman	8	22	11	11	21	19	27	10	37	9	33	30	35	25	22	24	15	8	21	6	8	19	15	12	19	10	9	15	11	17	25	15	8	18	11	15	769	52	–
18	Ricky Stenhouse Jr.	29	16	14	23	18	37	25	4	23	5	15	11	10	14	29	18	16	17*^{12}	26	30	22	16	18	24	12	34	30	13	37	9	3	20	19	11	33	16	701	57	2
19	Paul Menard	6	17	9	36	19	13	30	13	24	30^{2}	34	6	14	11	5	26	**13**	28	11	17	21	28	16	36	17	9	10	22	33	16	9	32	22	13	29	25	692	80	1
20	Jamie McMurray	16	19	36	26	17	26	3	19	19	28	16	31	6	15	10	37	12	30	17	18	20	7	21	29	9	7	35	21	2	18	35	17	16	19	6	18	683	29	–
21	Daniel Suárez	37	15	26	8	23	18	29	11	10	10	3	28	15	24	30	15	11	35	15	22	**2**	4	11	18	29	18	8	17	21	10	16	24	9	28	36	30	674	34	–
22	A. J. Allmendinger	10	29	30	21	22	8	24	17	27	34	21	16	23	22	17	38^{1}	24	3	30	36	14	15	22	39	22	37	14	29	7	22	6	21	14	20	12	19	603	26	1
23	William Byron **(R)**	23	18	27	12	15	20	10	18	12	29	14	33	39	18	13	25	20	32	20	14	6	8	36	23	35	19	37	20	34	19	20	38	39	16	9	24	587	41	–
24	Chris Buescher	5	25	15	29	30	23	15	36	26	11	20	34	29	17	24	12	22	5	23	20	37	20	20	19	13	25	15	30	17	25	21	16	13	23	18	23	585	7	–
25	David Ragan	30	23	23	22	25	25	23	12	33	6	27	13	25	16	38	22	38	15	18	29	19	26	27	17	18	24	27	23	16	24	39	19	18	24	20	20	524	5	–
26	Michael McDowell	9	24	37	32	26	21	14	38	31	32	22	20	18	21	25	21	21	26	24	26	16	18	25	37	20	17	29	24	18	26	40	27	25	29	16	28	493	36	–
27	Ty Dillon	39	26	24	30	27	22	13	28	20	15	24	38	21	23	21	33	28	6	29	23	24	23	38	21	21	21	34	28	22	29	15	25	15	22	19	22	482	12	–
28	Bubba Wallace **(R)**	2	32	21	28	20	34	8	16	25	16	25	23	16	38	19	29	23	14	27	24	33	25	23	38	26	38	38	27	36	23	19	26	34	25	10	21	471	5	–
29	Matt DiBenedetto	27	31	22	25	31	32	16	21	16	19	29	22	37	37	36	17	29	7	37	28	27	33	24	22	38	36	24	34	13	27	30	23	36	38	21	26	368	–	–
30	Kasey Kahne	34	21	19	24	24	24	17	34	29	17	17	21	20	36	23	20	27	4	25	19	30	21	26	15	24												358	14	–
31	Trevor Bayne	13	35	20	20	37	33	12	24	21	38	19					27	26	20					34	11			13		35		13	30		21			287	6	–
32	Matt Kenseth												36	17	13	33				19	15	18	29			25	12^{2}		25		20			23		7	6	268	11	1
33	Regan Smith																										20	12	31	15	21	10	28	28	27	22	39	157	–	–
34	Corey LaJoie	40			37				25			38	24	26		27		34	31	31	27	39		40	34	27	27	16	32		30	32	34		40		34	144	–	–
35	Cole Whitt		28	28		28	27	19		30	21				30		35						34							20				24		25		132	–	–
36	Gray Gaulding	20	36	33	34	32	36	20	31	35	24	30	29	31	33	31	30	31				QL		33	40		Wth		40									119	–	–
37	Jeffrey Earnhardt	21	34	31	35	36								30					11			29		39		34	32	25	37	26	31	37	37					110	–	–
38	Kyle Weatherman																	33			31	31						26					35		34		36	33	–	–
39	Harrison Rhodes		33				35	22	37	36																					38							24	–	–
40	Blake Jones																				33			30	27													21	–	–
41	Mark Thompson	22																																				15	–	–
42	Cody Ware											36^{†}					36															38				28		11	–	–
43	Derrike Cope											37	Wth		34											33												8	–	–
44	Tanner Berryhill																																			31	38	7	–	–
45	Chris Cook																31																					6	–	–
46	Tomy Drissi																32																					5	–	–
47	Danica Patrick	35																																				2	–	–
48	Alon Day																												38									1	–	–
49	Stanton Barrett																													40								1	–	–
50	Hermie Sadler																																	40				1	–	–
Ineligible for Monster Energy NASCAR Cup driver points
Pos.	Driver	DAY	ATL	LVS	PHO	CAL	MAR	TEX	BRI	RCH	TAL	DOV	KAN	CLT	POC	MCH	SON	CHI	DAY	KEN	NHA	POC	GLN	MCH	BRI	DAR	IND	LVS	RCH	ROV	DOV	TAL	KAN	MAR	TEX	PHO	HOM	Pts.	Stage	Bonus
	Brendan Gaughan	28									22								12													12								
	Justin Marks	12															28													27										
	D. J. Kennington	24			31		28		27		20					34			13													34		27		27				
	David Gilliland	14																																						
	Ray Black Jr.																		16																					
	J. J. Yeley						31							38	32				18	38		28			32	31	29	17		28	32	36	31	31	36	38	32			
	Ross Chastain		30	29	27	29	29	18	39	28	25	28	26	24	28	26		30	21	28	25	35	32	35	26	28	26	20	33	24	37	24	39	29	32	24	33			
	Landon Cassill						38	21	20	34		31	25	28	31	32		36	24	33	37	34	31	29	25	30	31	18	36	29	33	22	29	32	35	26	31			
	Joey Gase			32							27								25							40			35			18		35	37					
	Parker Kligerman													27			23						24												31					
	Daniel Hemric									32																				23										
	Timothy Peters										23								DNQ																					
	Cole Custer			25											26														26											
	Reed Sorenson					34		31	32	38	37	32	27		Wth		Wth	32				32		QL	33	Wth	28	31					36		33					
	B. J. McLeod												35	33		37		35		32	34	40		31	DNQ	32	30	28			34		33				35			
	Timmy Hill				33	33					36		32	32		35		39		34		36		37	28	37	35	33	39	38	39		40	38	DNQ	39	37			
	Garrett Smithley															39				36				32																
	Chad Finchum								33																															
	Jeb Burton																																	33						
	Jesse Little																			35					35															
	Spencer Gallagher																						35																	
	Josh Bilicki																						36																	
	David Starr																										39					DNQ			39					
	Carl Long							Wth																																
Pos.	Driver	DAY	ATL	LVS	PHO	CAL	MAR	TEX	BRI	RCH	TAL	DOV	KAN	CLT	POC	MCH	SON	CHI	DAY	KEN	NHA	POC	GLN	MCH	BRI	DAR	IND	LVS	RCH	ROV	DOV	TAL	KAN	MAR	TEX	PHO	HOM	Pts.	Stage	Bonus
^{†} – Cody Ware started receiving points at Sonoma.

=== Manufacturers' championship ===
Pos	Manufacturer	Wins	Points
1	Ford	19	1310
2	Toyota	13	1286
3	Chevrolet	4	1187

=== Contingency Awards ===
Award	Recipient
3M Hard Charger Award	
American Ethanol Green Flag Restart Award	Kevin Harvick
Busch Pole Award	Kurt Busch
Ingersoll Rand Power Move Award	
MAHLE Engine Builder Award	Doug Yates
Mechanix Wear Most Valuable Pit Crew	Joe Gibbs Racing
MOOG Go the Extra Mile Award	Adam Stevens
Sherwin-Williams Fastest Lap Award	
NASCAR Rookie of the Year	William Byron
Most Popular Driver	Chase Elliott
Mobil 1 Driver of the Year	Ricky Stenhouse Jr.

== See also ==
- 2018 NASCAR Xfinity Series
- 2018 NASCAR Camping World Truck Series
- 2018 NASCAR K&N Pro Series East
- 2018 NASCAR K&N Pro Series West
- 2018 NASCAR Whelen Modified Tour
- 2018 NASCAR Pinty's Series
- 2018 NASCAR PEAK Mexico Series
- 2018 NASCAR Whelen Euro Series
