= 2018 Advance Auto Parts Clash =

Motor car race in Florida, U.S.

Race details
- Race 1 of 2 exhibition races in the 2018 Monster Energy NASCAR Cup Series
- Date: February 11, 2018
- Location: Daytona International Speedway in Daytona Beach, Florida
- Course: Permanent racing facility
- Course length: 2.5 miles (4 km)
- Distance: 75 laps, 187.5 mi (300 km)
- Average speed: 169.641 mph (273.011 km/h)

Pole position
Driver	Austin Dillon	Richard Childress Racing

Most laps led
Driver	Brad Keselowski	Team Penske
- Laps: 43

Winner
No. 2	Brad Keselowski	Team Penske

Television in the United States
- Network: FS1
- Announcers: Mike Joy, Jeff Gordon and Darrell Waltrip
- Nielsen ratings: 1.35 (Overnight)

Radio in the United States
- Radio: MRN
- Booth announcers: Joe Moore, Jeff Striegle and Rusty Wallace
- Turn announcers: Dave Moody (1 & 2), Mike Bagley (Backstretch) and Kyle Rickey (3 & 4)

The 2018 Advance Auto Parts Clash was a Monster Energy NASCAR Cup Series race held on February 11, 2018, at Daytona International Speedway in Daytona Beach, Florida. Contested over 75 laps, it was the first exhibition race of the 2018 Monster Energy NASCAR Cup Series season.

== Report ==
=== Format and eligibility ===
The race is 75 laps in length, and is divided into two segments; the first is 25 laps and the second is 50 laps. The race is open to those drivers who won a pole in the 2017 season or had won "The Clash" previously.

The 2018 Clash at Daytona will not be a predetermined number of cars; rather, the field is limited to drivers who meet more exclusive criteria. Only drivers who were 2017 Pole Award winners, former Clash race winners, former Daytona 500 pole winners who competed full–time in 2017 and drivers who qualified for the 2017 Playoffs are eligible.

== Entry list ==
No.	Driver	Team	Manufacturer
1	Jamie McMurray	Chip Ganassi Racing	Chevrolet
2	Brad Keselowski	Team Penske	Ford
3	Austin Dillon	Richard Childress Racing	Chevrolet
4	Kevin Harvick	Stewart–Haas Racing	Ford
9	Chase Elliott	Hendrick Motorsports	Chevrolet
11	Denny Hamlin	Joe Gibbs Racing	Toyota
12	Ryan Blaney	Team Penske	Ford
17	Ricky Stenhouse Jr.	Roush Fenway Racing	Ford
18	Kyle Busch	Joe Gibbs Racing	Toyota
20	Erik Jones	Joe Gibbs Racing	Toyota
22	Joey Logano	Team Penske	Ford
31	Ryan Newman	Richard Childress Racing	Chevrolet
41	Kurt Busch	Stewart–Haas Racing	Ford
42	Kyle Larson	Chip Ganassi Racing	Chevrolet
48	Jimmie Johnson	Hendrick Motorsports	Chevrolet
78	Martin Truex Jr.	Furniture Row Racing	Toyota
95	Kasey Kahne	Leavine Family Racing	Chevrolet
Official entry list

== Practice ==
Ryan Blaney was the fastest in the practice session with a time of 45.090 seconds and a speed of 199.601 mph (321.227 km/h).

Pos	No.	Driver	Team	Manufacturer	Time	Speed
1	12	Ryan Blaney	Team Penske	Ford	45.090	199.601
2	22	Joey Logano	Team Penske	Ford	45.103	199.543
3	17	Ricky Stenhouse Jr.	Roush Fenway Racing	Ford	45.111	199.508
Official practice results

== Starting lineup ==
The lineup was determined by random draw, with Austin Dillon drawing the top spot.

Pos	No	Driver	Team	Manufacturer
1	3	Austin Dillon	Richard Childress Racing	Chevrolet
2	11	Denny Hamlin	Joe Gibbs Racing	Toyota
3	22	Joey Logano	Team Penske	Ford
4	20	Erik Jones	Joe Gibbs Racing	Toyota
5	48	Jimmie Johnson	Hendrick Motorsports	Chevrolet
6	78	Martin Truex Jr.	Furniture Row Racing	Toyota
7	95	Kasey Kahne	Leavine Family Racing	Chevrolet
8	17	Ricky Stenhouse Jr.	Roush Fenway Racing	Ford
9	4	Kevin Harvick	Stewart–Haas Racing	Ford
10	42	Kyle Larson	Chip Ganassi Racing	Chevrolet
11	31	Ryan Newman	Richard Childress Racing	Chevrolet
12	9	Chase Elliott	Hendrick Motorsports	Chevrolet
13	18	Kyle Busch	Joe Gibbs Racing	Toyota
14	41	Kurt Busch	Stewart–Haas Racing	Ford
15	12	Ryan Blaney	Team Penske	Ford
16	1	Jamie McMurray	Chip Ganassi Racing	Chevrolet
17	2	Brad Keselowski	Team Penske	Ford
Official starting lineup

== Race ==
Austin Dillon led the field to the green flag. He would lead the first lap of the race, as Denny Hamlin would pass him just after the start finish line to take over the lead. By lap 6, the field quickly became mostly single file on the top lane. On lap 7 heading into turn 1, Kyle Larson, who was running 5th at that time, made contact with Ricky Stenhouse Jr. which resulted in Larson getting loose onto the apron and back up the track to save it, but fell all the way back to 16th. On lap 10, the field suddenly became double wide in front as Chase Elliott was able to pass Hamlin for the lead. Elliott would be challenged by Austin Dillon for the lead side by side for the next several laps, but Elliott would manage to hang on with the lead. By lap 22, Elliott would again be challenged for the lead this time with Joey Logano, who was running near the front the whole time, with Logano taking over the lead on lap 24 after a push from Martin Truex Jr. On lap 25, all but Kyle Larson, Kevin Harvick, Ricky Stenhouse Jr., Ryan Newman, and Jamie McMurray pitted for fuel and tires. Brad Keselowski was first off of pit road after only taking two tires as the competition caution came out on lap 26. The drivers who didn't pit before the caution ended up pitting for service. Jimmie Johnson was busted after driving through too many pit boxes and would restart at the tail end of the field.

The race restarted with 46 to go as Keselowski the leader. On lap 33, Chase Elliott got shuffled out of line while running 2nd and would fall back to 7th. The second caution came out on lap 34 when Jamie McMurray got side drafted by Kurt Busch which caused Jamie to get loose and spin into the outside wall, causing significant damage to the right front.

The race restarted with 37 to go with Keselowski leading. With 33 to go, Martin Truex Jr., came up behind Keselowski to take over the lead for a brief moment, when Keselowski passed Truex on the same lap. At the same time, Ricky Stenhouse Jr. got forced below the double yellow line and passed Kyle Busch when he was below the line. He would be assessed a drive-thru penalty that would ultimately eliminate him out of contention. The field became single file once again with 29 to go.

With 8 laps to go, the field was still running single file as Brad Keselowski stayed in the lead. His car picked up a big piece of debris that covered a third of his grille, but that didn't really affect him during the race. At 2 laps to go, Austin Dillon was first to make a second lane from the 8th position as Chase Elliott joined him in the inside lane. On the white flag, Ryan Blaney attempted to make a move on the inside, but Keselowski blocked Blaney. On the back straightaway, Kyle Larson bumped Jimmie Johnson into the outside wall creating a multi-car crash collecting Kasey Kahne, Martin Truex Jr., Chase Elliott, and Kyle Busch. This brought out the final caution and Keselowski was ahead of the wreck and drove on to his first Clash victory.

=== Race results ===
Pos	Grid	No	Driver	Team	Manufacturer	Laps
1	17	2	Brad Keselowski	Team Penske	Ford	75
2	3	22	Joey Logano	Team Penske	Ford	75
3	14	41	Kurt Busch	Stewart–Haas Racing	Ford	75
4	15	12	Ryan Blaney	Team Penske	Ford	75
5	1	3	Austin Dillon	Richard Childress Racing	Chevrolet	75
6	2	11	Denny Hamlin	Joe Gibbs Racing	Toyota	75
7	13	18	Kyle Busch	Joe Gibbs Racing	Toyota	75
8	4	20	Erik Jones	Joe Gibbs Racing	Toyota	75
9	9	4	Kevin Harvick	Stewart–Haas Racing	Ford	75
10	10	42	Kyle Larson	Chip Ganassi Racing	Chevrolet	75
11	11	31	Ryan Newman	Richard Childress Racing	Chevrolet	75
12	5	48	Jimmie Johnson	Hendrick Motorsports	Chevrolet	74
13	12	9	Chase Elliott	Hendrick Motorsports	Chevrolet	74
14	6	78	Martin Truex Jr.	Furniture Row Racing	Toyota	74
15	7	95	Kasey Kahne	Leavine Family Racing	Chevrolet	74
16	8	17	Ricky Stenhouse Jr.	Roush Fenway Racing	Ford	73
17	16	1	Jamie McMurray	Chip Ganassi Racing	Chevrolet	43
Official race results

== Media ==
FS1 covered the race on the television side; Mike Joy, Darrell Waltrip and Jeff Gordon handled the call in the booth for the race; Matt Yocum, Jamie Little and Vince Welch handled pit road for the television side.

=== Television ===
FS1
Booth announcers	Pit reporters
Lap-by-lap: Mike Joy; Color-commentator: Jeff Gordon; Color commentator: Darrell Waltrip	Jamie Little; Vince Welch; Matt Yocum

=== Radio ===
MRN Radio
Booth announcers	Turn announcers	Pit reporters
Lead announcer: Joe Moore; Announcer: Jeff Striegle; Announcer: Rusty Wallace	Turns 1 & 2: Dave Moody; Backstretch: Mike Bagley; Turns 3 & 4: Kyle Rickey	Alex Hayden; Winston Kelley; Steve Post
