= 2018 Can-Am Duels =

2018 qualifying race for that year's Daytona 500

Race details
- Date: February 15, 2018
- Location: Daytona International Speedway; Daytona Beach, Florida
- Course: Permanent racing facility 2.5 mi (4 km)
- Distance: Race 1: 63 laps, 157.5 mi (252 km); Race 2: 60 laps, 150 mi (240 km)
- Avg Speed: Race 1: 138.124 mph (222.289 km/h); Race 2: 181.879 mph (292.706 km/h)

Race 1
- Pole position: Alex Bowman
- Most laps led: Joey Logano (56)
- Winner: Ryan Blaney

Race 2
- Pole position: Denny Hamlin
- Most laps led: Chase Elliott (34)
- Winner: Chase Elliott

Television
- Network: FS1 & MRN
- Announcers: Mike Joy, Jeff Gordon and Darrell Waltrip (Television); Joe Moore, Jeff Striegle and Rusty Wallace (Booth); Dave Moody (1 & 2), Mike Bagley (Backstretch) and Kyle Rickey (3 & 4) (Turns) (Radio)

The 2018 Can-Am Duels were a pair of Monster Energy NASCAR Cup Series stock car races held on February 15, 2018, at Daytona International Speedway in Daytona Beach, Florida. Both contested over 60 laps, they were the qualifying races for the 2018 Daytona 500, and also counted as the first stage of the race, although no playoff points were awarded, the top ten in each race earn championship points as is normal in a stage.

== Qualifying ==
Alex Bowman scored the pole for the race with a time of 46.002 and a speed of 195.644 mph (314.858 km/h).

=== Qualifying results ===
Pos	No	Driver	Team	Manufacturer	R1	R2
1	88	Alex Bowman	Hendrick Motorsports	Chevrolet	46.181	46.002
2	11	Denny Hamlin	Joe Gibbs Racing	Toyota	46.201	46.132
3	48	Jimmie Johnson	Hendrick Motorsports	Chevrolet	46.420	46.217
4	18	Kyle Busch	Joe Gibbs Racing	Toyota	46.366	46.224
5	24	William Byron (R)	Hendrick Motorsports	Chevrolet	46.328	46.261
6	20	Erik Jones	Joe Gibbs Racing	Toyota	46.513	46.279
7	19	Daniel Suárez	Joe Gibbs Racing	Toyota	46.412	46.280
8	4	Kevin Harvick	Stewart–Haas Racing	Ford	46.420	46.281
9	17	Ricky Stenhouse Jr.	Roush Fenway Racing	Ford	46.313	46.381
10	9	Chase Elliott	Hendrick Motorsports	Chevrolet	46.534	46.413
11	22	Joey Logano	Team Penske	Ford	46.422	46.437
12	21	Paul Menard	Wood Brothers Racing	Ford	46.470	46.584
13	10	Aric Almirola	Stewart–Haas Racing	Ford	46.539	—
14	3	Austin Dillon	Richard Childress Racing	Chevrolet	46.546	—
15	12	Ryan Blaney	Team Penske	Ford	46.577	—
16	14	Clint Bowyer	Stewart–Haas Racing	Ford	46.658	—
17	41	Kurt Busch	Stewart–Haas Racing	Ford	46.678	—
18	95	Kasey Kahne	Leavine Family Racing	Chevrolet	46.694	—
19	2	Brad Keselowski	Team Penske	Ford	46.698	—
20	6	Trevor Bayne	Roush Fenway Racing	Ford	46.781	—
21	31	Ryan Newman	Richard Childress Racing	Chevrolet	46.816	—
22	42	Kyle Larson	Chip Ganassi Racing	Chevrolet	46.817	—
23	1	Jamie McMurray	Chip Ganassi Racing	Chevrolet	46.836	—
24	34	Michael McDowell	Front Row Motorsports	Ford	46.899	—
25	43	Bubba Wallace (R)	Richard Petty Motorsports	Chevrolet	46.938	—
26	78	Martin Truex Jr.	Furniture Row Racing	Toyota	47.002	—
27	13	Ty Dillon	Germain Racing	Chevrolet	47.074	—
28	7	Danica Patrick	Premium Motorsports	Chevrolet	47.081	—
29	37	Chris Buescher	JTG Daugherty Racing	Chevrolet	47.095	—
30	47	A. J. Allmendinger	JTG Daugherty Racing	Chevrolet	47.144	—
31	62	Brendan Gaughan	Beard Motorsports	Chevrolet	47.398	—
32	51	Justin Marks (i)	Rick Ware Racing	Chevrolet	47.464	—
33	32	Matt DiBenedetto	Go Fas Racing	Ford	47.675	—
34	96	D. J. Kennington	Gaunt Brothers Racing	Toyota	47.848	—
35	00	Jeffrey Earnhardt	StarCom Racing	Chevrolet	47.866	—
36	92	David Gilliland (i)	RBR Enterprises	Ford	47.884	—
37	66	Mark Thompson	MBM Motorsports	Ford	48.267	—
38	72	Corey LaJoie	TriStar Motorsports	Chevrolet	48.372	—
39	23	Gray Gaulding	BK Racing	Toyota	0.000	—
40	38	David Ragan	Front Row Motorsports	Ford	0.000	—
Official qualifying results

== Duels ==
=== Duel 1 ===
==== Duel 1 results ====
Pos	Grid	No	Driver	Team	Manufacturer	Laps	Points
1	8	12	Ryan Blaney	Team Penske	Ford	63	10
2	6	22	Joey Logano	Team Penske	Ford	63	9
3	13	43	Bubba Wallace (R)	Richard Petty Motorsports	Chevrolet	63	8
4	5	17	Ricky Stenhouse Jr.	Roush Fenway Racing	Ford	63	7
5	9	41	Kurt Busch	Stewart–Haas Racing	Ford	63	6
6	11	31	Ryan Newman	Richard Childress Racing	Chevrolet	63	5
7	20	38	David Ragan	Front Row Motorsports	Ford	63	4
8	4	19	Daniel Suárez	Joe Gibbs Racing	Toyota	63	3
9	12	1	Jamie McMurray	Chip Ganassi Racing	Chevrolet	63	2
10	15	37	Chris Buescher	JTG Daugherty Racing	Chevrolet	63	1
11	14	13	Ty Dillon	Germain Racing	Chevrolet	63	0
12	16	62	Brendan Gaughan	Beard Motorsports	Chevrolet	63	0
13	18	00	Jeffrey Earnhardt	StarCom Racing	Chevrolet	63	0
14	1	88	Alex Bowman	Hendrick Motorsports	Chevrolet	63	0
15	17	51	Justin Marks (i)	Rick Ware Racing	Chevrolet	63	0
16	10	2	Brad Keselowski	Team Penske	Ford	57	0
17	19	92	David Gilliland (i)	RBR Enterprises	Ford	47	0
18	3	24	William Byron (R)	Hendrick Motorsports	Chevrolet	38	0
19	2	48	Jimmie Johnson	Hendrick Motorsports	Chevrolet	8	0
20	7	10	Aric Almirola	Stewart–Haas Racing	Ford	8	0
Official race results

=== Duel 2 ===
==== Duel 2 results ====
Pos	Grid	No	Driver	Team	Manufacturer	Laps	Points
1	5	9	Chase Elliott	Hendrick Motorsports	Chevrolet	60	10
2	4	4	Kevin Harvick	Stewart–Haas Racing	Ford	60	9
3	3	20	Erik Jones	Joe Gibbs Racing	Toyota	60	8
4	8	14	Clint Bowyer	Stewart–Haas Racing	Ford	60	7
5	2	18	Kyle Busch	Joe Gibbs Racing	Toyota	60	6
6	7	3	Austin Dillon	Richard Childress Racing	Chevrolet	60	5
7	6	21	Paul Menard	Wood Brothers Racing	Ford	60	4
8	10	6	Trevor Bayne	Roush Fenway Racing	Ford	60	3
9	1	11	Denny Hamlin	Joe Gibbs Racing	Toyota	60	2
10	15	47	A. J. Allmendinger	JTG Daugherty Racing	Chevrolet	60	1
11	12	34	Michael McDowell	Front Row Motorsports	Ford	60	0
12	13	78	Martin Truex Jr.	Furniture Row Racing	Toyota	60	0
13	9	95	Kasey Kahne	Leavine Family Racing	Chevrolet	60	0
14	14	7	Danica Patrick	Premium Motorsports	Chevrolet	60	0
15	17	96	D. J. Kennington	Gaunt Brothers Racing	Toyota	58	0
16	19	72	Corey LaJoie	TriStar Motorsports	Chevrolet	58	0
17	20	23	Gray Gaulding	BK Racing	Toyota	55	0
18	18	66	Mark Thompson	MBM Motorsports	Ford	32	0
19	16	32	Matt DiBenedetto	Go Fas Racing	Ford	11	0
20	11	42	Kyle Larson	Chip Ganassi Racing	Chevrolet	11	0
Official race results

== Media ==
=== Television ===
FS1
Booth announcers	Pit reporters
Lap-by-lap: Mike Joy; Color-commentator: Jeff Gordon; Color commentator: Darrell Waltrip	Jamie Little; Regan Smith; Vince Welch; Matt Yocum

=== Radio ===
MRN Radio
Booth announcers	Turn announcers	Pit reporters
Lead announcer: Joe Moore; Announcer: Jeff Striegle; Announcer: Rusty Wallace	Turns 1 & 2: Dave Moody; Backstretch: Mike Bagley; Turns 3 & 4: Kyle Rickey	Alex Hayden; Winston Kelley; Steve Post
