= 2019 Monster Energy NASCAR Cup Series =

American motorsport season

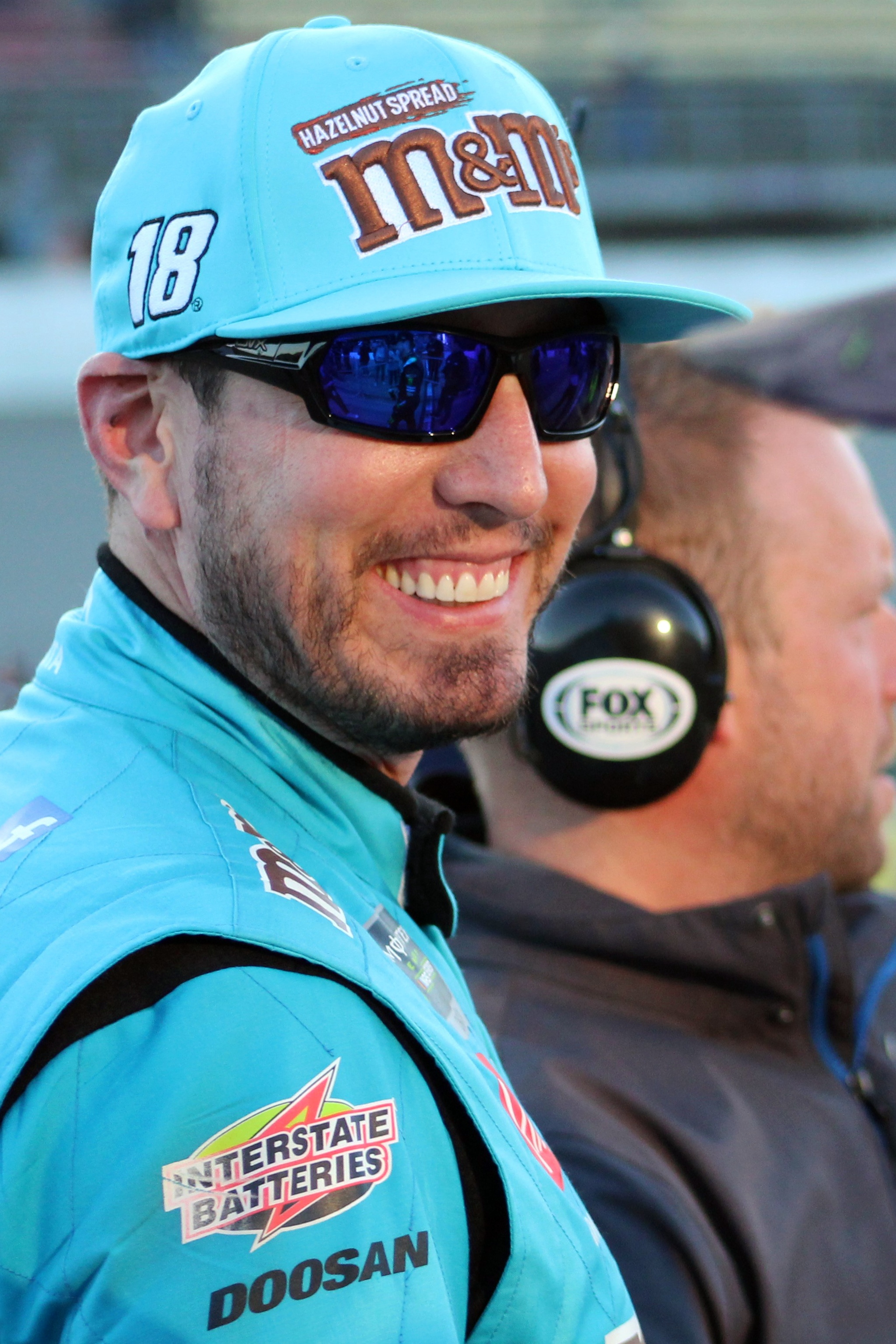
Kyle Busch, the 2019 Monster Energy NASCAR Cup Series champion and 2019 regular season champion

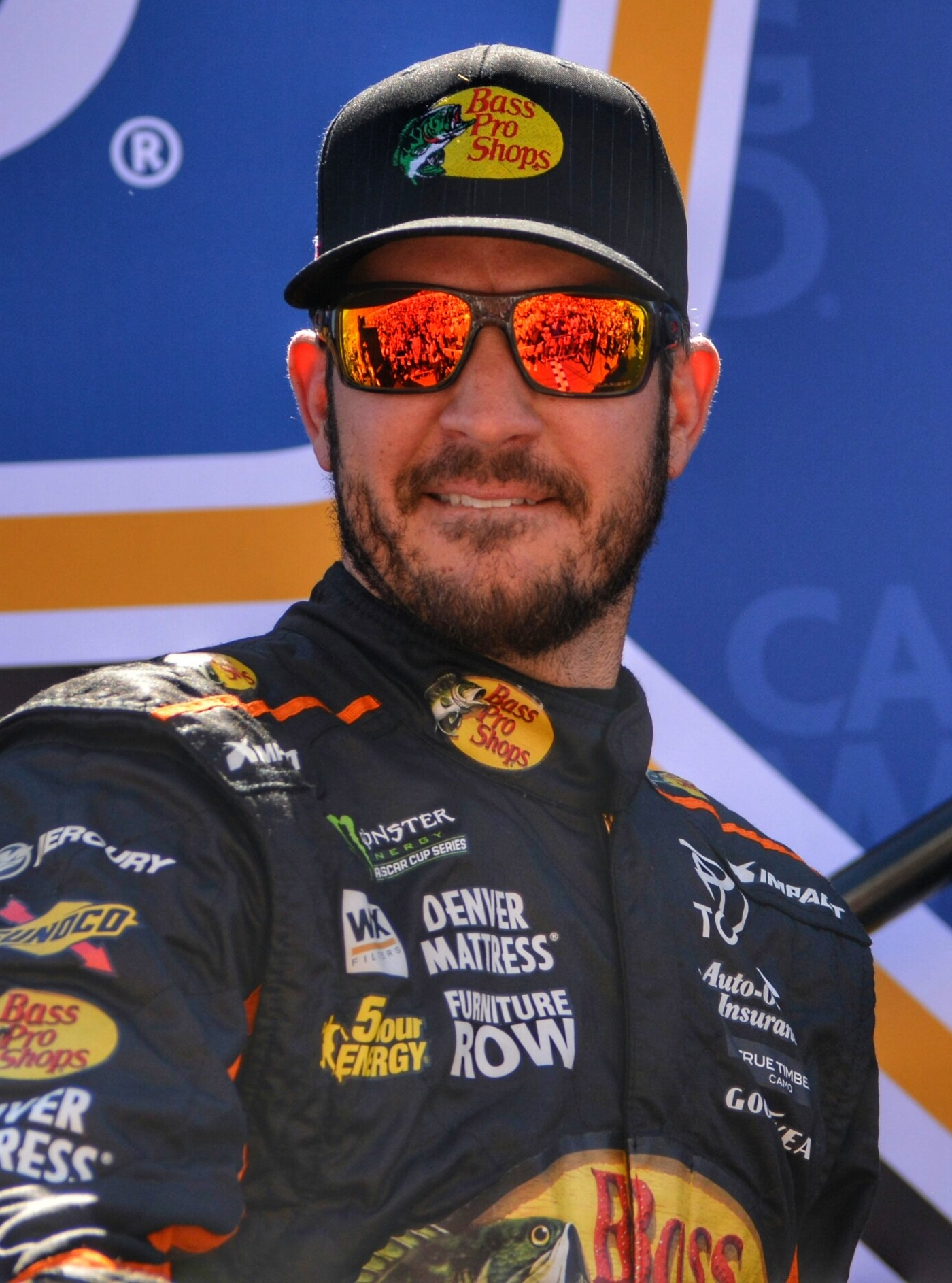
Martin Truex Jr. finished 5 points behind Kyle Busch in second place.

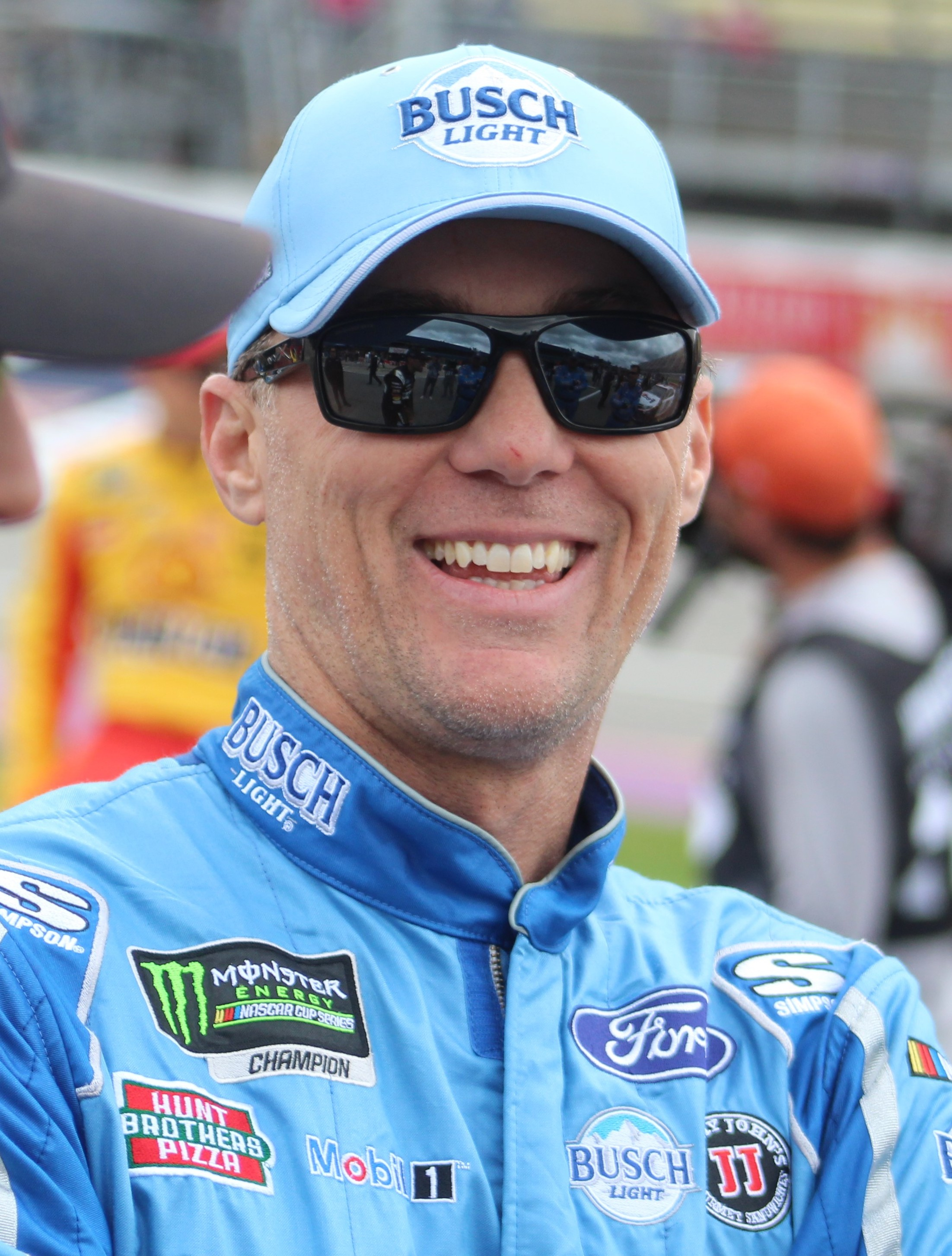
Kevin Harvick finished 7 points behind Kyle Busch in third place.

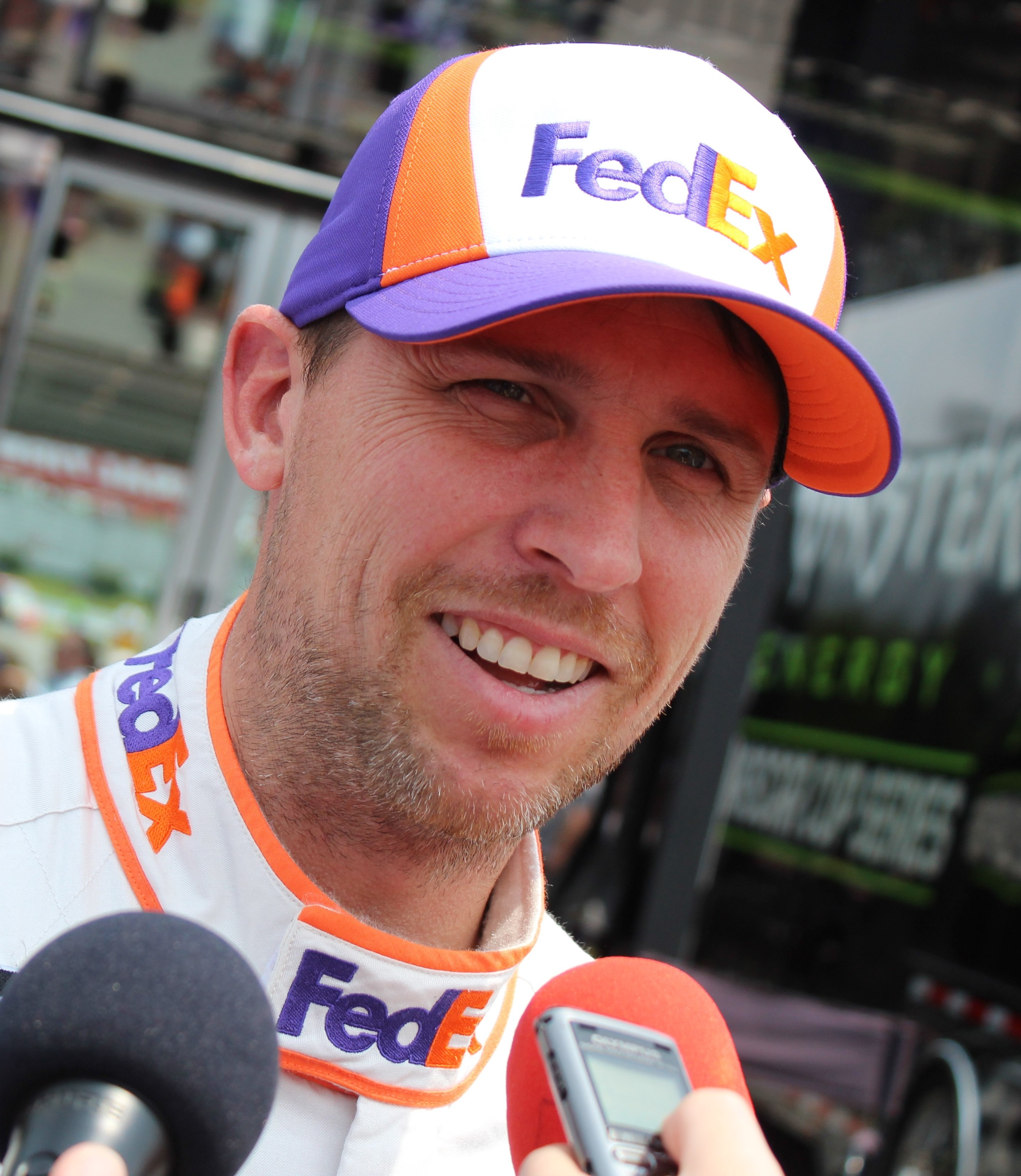
Denny Hamlin finished 13 points behind Kyle Busch in fourth place.

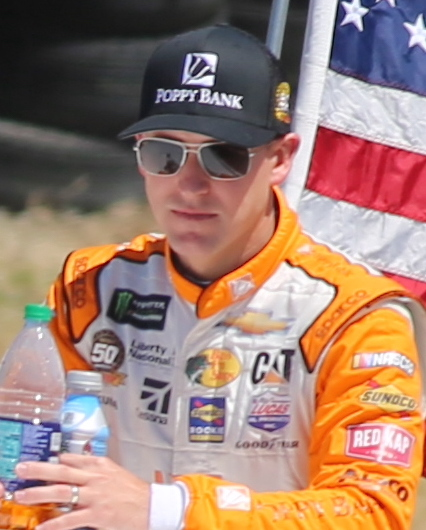
Daniel Hemric, the 2019 NASCAR Rookie of the Year

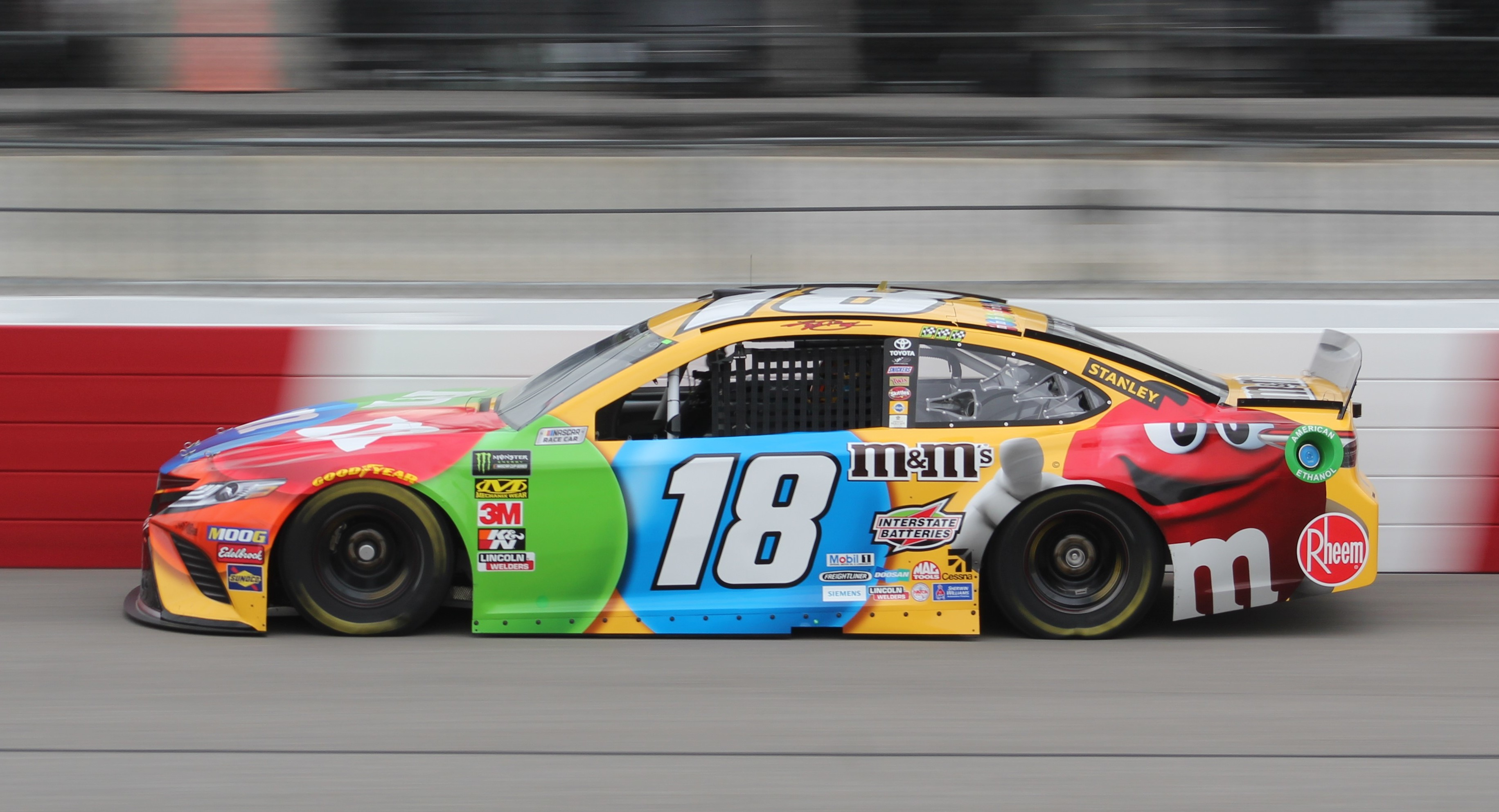
Toyota won the Manufacturers' championship with 19 wins and 1318 points.

The 2019 Monster Energy NASCAR Cup Series was the 71st season of NASCAR professional stock car racing in the United States, and the 48th modern-era Cup series season. The season began at Daytona International Speedway with the Advance Auto Parts Clash, the Gander RV Duel qualifying races and the 61st running of the Daytona 500. The regular season ended with the Brickyard 400 in September. The playoffs ended with the Ford EcoBoost 400 at Homestead–Miami Speedway on November 17, 2019. Joey Logano of Team Penske entered as the defending series champion.

The 2019 season was the fifth of a 10-year television contract with Fox Sports and NBC Sports and the fourth of a five-year race sanctioning agreement with all tracks. It was the first season in which Ford fielded the Mustang GT, replacing the Fusion. This was the final season of title sponsor Monster Energy, as NASCAR rejected the energy drink company's extension offer in favor of a new tiered sponsorship model. This was also the final season for Darrell Waltrip covering races in the booth as during the season he announced that the June 23 Toyota/Save Mart 350 would be his last race as a broadcaster.

Following the 2019 Bojangles' Southern 500 at Darlington Raceway, Kyle Busch of Joe Gibbs Racing clinched his second consecutive Regular Season Championship.

Busch then went on to win the championship after winning the season finale at Homestead. It was his second and final championship win before his sudden death on May 21, 2026, due to illness and the first he won after competing in all 36 races during the season, after his injury in 2015 sidelined him for the first 11 races of that season. Busch had won four of the first 14 races of the season, before enduring a 21-race winless streak. His early-season success did give him plenty of playoff points and carried him through the Round of 8 at the expense of 2018 champion Logano on points.

The other members of the Championship 4 all qualified through wins in the semifinal phase. Those were Martin Truex Jr., Kevin Harvick and Denny Hamlin, who finished in that order among the title contenders at Homestead. Truex and Harvick had finished second and third also in the 2018 title race. Reigning champion Logano ended up fifth in the overall standings. Hamlin, while missing out on the title, was the Daytona 500 winner. Joe Gibbs Racing and Toyota had three of the four title contenders and won 19 of the 36 races. Alex Bowman and Justin Haley obtained their first career victories, whereas Daniel Hemric won Rookie of the Year honors. Seven-time Series Champion Jimmie Johnson would miss the Playoffs for the first time since its inception in 2004 after fifteen consecutive appearances.

The 2019 season was the last full-time season for drivers David Ragan and Paul Menard, who each retired after twelve years of racing full-time in the Cup Series. It was also inadvertently the last season to feature Chicagoland Speedway until 2026. After having its event cancelled in 2020 due to the COVID-19 pandemic, the track was dropped from the schedule for 2021.

== Teams and drivers ==
=== Chartered teams ===
Manufacturer	Team	No.	Race driver	Crew chief
Chevrolet	Chip Ganassi Racing	1	Kurt Busch	Matt McCall
Chevrolet	Chip Ganassi Racing	42	Kyle Larson	Chad Johnston
Chevrolet	Germain Racing	13	Ty Dillon	Matt Borland 32; Justin Alexander 4
Chevrolet	Hendrick Motorsports	9	Chase Elliott	Alan Gustafson
Chevrolet	Hendrick Motorsports	24	William Byron	Chad Knaus
Chevrolet	Hendrick Motorsports	48	Jimmie Johnson	Kevin Meendering 21; Cliff Daniels 15
Chevrolet	Hendrick Motorsports	88	Alex Bowman	Greg Ives
Chevrolet	JTG Daugherty Racing	37	Chris Buescher	Trent Owens
Chevrolet	JTG Daugherty Racing	47	Ryan Preece (R)	Tristan Smith 30; Eddie Pardue 6
Chevrolet	Premium Motorsports	15	Ross Chastain 32	Peter Sospenzo 1 Pat Tryson 35
Chevrolet	Premium Motorsports	15	Garrett Smithley 1	Peter Sospenzo 1 Pat Tryson 35
Chevrolet	Premium Motorsports	15	Quin Houff 1	Peter Sospenzo 1 Pat Tryson 35
Chevrolet	Premium Motorsports	15	Joe Nemechek 2	Peter Sospenzo 1 Pat Tryson 35
Chevrolet	Richard Childress Racing	3	Austin Dillon	Danny Stockman Jr.
Chevrolet	Richard Childress Racing	8	Daniel Hemric (R)	Luke Lambert 35; Justin Alexander 1
Chevrolet	Richard Petty Motorsports	43	Bubba Wallace	Derek Stamets
Chevrolet	Spire Motorsports	77	Jamie McMurray 1 (Note: Entry was fielded in a collaboration with Chip Ganassi Racing.)	Scott Eggleston 1 Peter Sospenzo 23; Tommy Baldwin Jr. 12
Chevrolet	Spire Motorsports	77	Garrett Smithley 4	Scott Eggleston 1 Peter Sospenzo 23; Tommy Baldwin Jr. 12
Chevrolet	Spire Motorsports	77	Reed Sorenson 11	Scott Eggleston 1 Peter Sospenzo 23; Tommy Baldwin Jr. 12
Chevrolet	Spire Motorsports	77	Quin Houff 13	Scott Eggleston 1 Peter Sospenzo 23; Tommy Baldwin Jr. 12
Chevrolet	Spire Motorsports	77	D. J. Kennington 1	Scott Eggleston 1 Peter Sospenzo 23; Tommy Baldwin Jr. 12
Chevrolet	Spire Motorsports	77	Justin Haley 3	Scott Eggleston 1 Peter Sospenzo 23; Tommy Baldwin Jr. 12
Chevrolet	Spire Motorsports	77	Blake Jones 1	Scott Eggleston 1 Peter Sospenzo 23; Tommy Baldwin Jr. 12
Chevrolet	Spire Motorsports	77	Timmy Hill 2	Scott Eggleston 1 Peter Sospenzo 23; Tommy Baldwin Jr. 12
Chevrolet	StarCom Racing	00	Landon Cassill	Wayne Carroll Jr. 1 Joe Williams Jr. 35
Ford	Front Row Motorsports	34	Michael McDowell	Drew Blickensderfer
Ford	Front Row Motorsports	36	Matt Tifft (R) 32	Mike Kelley 20; Seth Barbour 16
Ford	Front Row Motorsports	36	Matt Crafton 1	Mike Kelley 20; Seth Barbour 16
Ford	Front Row Motorsports	36	John Hunter Nemechek 3	Mike Kelley 20; Seth Barbour 16
Ford	Front Row Motorsports	38	David Ragan	Seth Barbour 20; Mike Kelley 16
Ford	Go Fas Racing	32	Corey LaJoie	Randy Cox
Ford	Roush Fenway Racing	6	Ryan Newman	Scott Graves
Ford	Roush Fenway Racing	17	Ricky Stenhouse Jr.	Brian Pattie
Ford	Stewart–Haas Racing	4	Kevin Harvick	Rodney Childers
Ford	Stewart–Haas Racing	10	Aric Almirola	Johnny Klausmeier
Ford	Stewart–Haas Racing	14	Clint Bowyer	Mike Bugarewicz
Ford	Stewart–Haas Racing	41	Daniel Suárez	Billy Scott
Ford	Team Penske	2	Brad Keselowski	Paul Wolfe
Ford	Team Penske	12	Ryan Blaney	Jeremy Bullins
Ford	Team Penske	22	Joey Logano	Todd Gordon
Ford	Wood Brothers Racing	21	Paul Menard	Greg Erwin
Toyota	Joe Gibbs Racing	11	Denny Hamlin	Chris Gabehart
Toyota	Joe Gibbs Racing	18	Kyle Busch	Adam Stevens
Toyota	Joe Gibbs Racing	19	Martin Truex Jr.	Cole Pearn
Toyota	Joe Gibbs Racing	20	Erik Jones	Chris Gayle
Toyota	Leavine Family Racing	95	Matt DiBenedetto	Mike Wheeler
Chevrolet 17 Ford 19	Petty Ware Racing (Note: The No. 51 car is officially listed on paper as Petty Ware Racing because they have a long-term partnership with Richard Petty Motorsports to use one of the charters they own. However, RPM is not involved with operating or helping this team out at the races in any way.)	51	B. J. McLeod 11	George Church 6 Mike Hillman Sr. 25; Lee Leslie 4 Jason Houghtaling 1
Chevrolet 17 Ford 19	Petty Ware Racing	51	Cody Ware 11 (Note: At the Charlotte Roval (Race 29), Cody Ware was scheduled to drive the No. 51, but after he was replaced mid-race in the Xfinity Series race there the previous day due to heat exhaustion, he was replaced in the Cup Series race by J. J. Yeley because he still wasn't feeling well on the day of the Cup Series race.)	George Church 6 Mike Hillman Sr. 25; Lee Leslie 4 Jason Houghtaling 1
Chevrolet 17 Ford 19	Petty Ware Racing	51	Gray Gaulding 1	George Church 6 Mike Hillman Sr. 25; Lee Leslie 4 Jason Houghtaling 1
Chevrolet 17 Ford 19	Petty Ware Racing	51	Jeb Burton 1	George Church 6 Mike Hillman Sr. 25; Lee Leslie 4 Jason Houghtaling 1
Chevrolet 17 Ford 19	Petty Ware Racing	51	Bayley Currey 2	George Church 6 Mike Hillman Sr. 25; Lee Leslie 4 Jason Houghtaling 1
Chevrolet 17 Ford 19	Petty Ware Racing	51	Kyle Weatherman 1	George Church 6 Mike Hillman Sr. 25; Lee Leslie 4 Jason Houghtaling 1
Chevrolet 17 Ford 19	Petty Ware Racing	51	J. J. Yeley 4	George Church 6 Mike Hillman Sr. 25; Lee Leslie 4 Jason Houghtaling 1
Chevrolet 17 Ford 19	Petty Ware Racing	51	Andy Seuss 1	George Church 6 Mike Hillman Sr. 25; Lee Leslie 4 Jason Houghtaling 1
Chevrolet 17 Ford 19	Petty Ware Racing	51	Austin Theriault 2	George Church 6 Mike Hillman Sr. 25; Lee Leslie 4 Jason Houghtaling 1
Chevrolet 17 Ford 19	Petty Ware Racing	51	Josh Bilicki 1	George Church 6 Mike Hillman Sr. 25; Lee Leslie 4 Jason Houghtaling 1
Chevrolet 17 Ford 19	Petty Ware Racing	51	Garrett Smithley 1	George Church 6 Mike Hillman Sr. 25; Lee Leslie 4 Jason Houghtaling 1
Chevrolet 19 Ford 17	Rick Ware Racing	52	Cody Ware 2	Mike Hillman Sr. 8 George Church 12; Lee Leslie 11; Jason Houghtaling 4 Jeff Spraker 1
Chevrolet 19 Ford 17	Rick Ware Racing	52	B. J. McLeod 5	Mike Hillman Sr. 8 George Church 12; Lee Leslie 11; Jason Houghtaling 4 Jeff Spraker 1
Chevrolet 19 Ford 17	Rick Ware Racing	52	Bayley Currey 8	Mike Hillman Sr. 8 George Church 12; Lee Leslie 11; Jason Houghtaling 4 Jeff Spraker 1
Chevrolet 19 Ford 17	Rick Ware Racing	52	Jeb Burton 1	Mike Hillman Sr. 8 George Church 12; Lee Leslie 11; Jason Houghtaling 4 Jeff Spraker 1
Chevrolet 19 Ford 17	Rick Ware Racing	52	Stanton Barrett 1	Mike Hillman Sr. 8 George Church 12; Lee Leslie 11; Jason Houghtaling 4 Jeff Spraker 1
Chevrolet 19 Ford 17	Rick Ware Racing	52	J. J. Yeley 5	Mike Hillman Sr. 8 George Church 12; Lee Leslie 11; Jason Houghtaling 4 Jeff Spraker 1
Chevrolet 19 Ford 17	Rick Ware Racing	52	Josh Bilicki (R) 3	Mike Hillman Sr. 8 George Church 12; Lee Leslie 11; Jason Houghtaling 4 Jeff Spraker 1
Chevrolet 19 Ford 17	Rick Ware Racing	52	Austin Theriault 3	Mike Hillman Sr. 8 George Church 12; Lee Leslie 11; Jason Houghtaling 4 Jeff Spraker 1
Chevrolet 19 Ford 17	Rick Ware Racing	52	Kyle Weatherman 1	Mike Hillman Sr. 8 George Church 12; Lee Leslie 11; Jason Houghtaling 4 Jeff Spraker 1
Chevrolet 19 Ford 17	Rick Ware Racing	52	Garrett Smithley 6	Mike Hillman Sr. 8 George Church 12; Lee Leslie 11; Jason Houghtaling 4 Jeff Spraker 1
Chevrolet 19 Ford 17	Rick Ware Racing	52	Spencer Boyd 1	Mike Hillman Sr. 8 George Church 12; Lee Leslie 11; Jason Houghtaling 4 Jeff Spraker 1

=== Limited schedule ===
Manufacturer	Team	No.	Race driver	Crew chief	Round(s)
Chevrolet	Beard Motorsports	62	Brendan Gaughan	Darren Shaw	4
Chevrolet	Germain Racing	27	Casey Mears (Note: Entry was fielded in a collaboration with Premium Motorsports.)	Pat Tryson	1
Chevrolet	Premium Motorsports	27	Reed Sorenson	Tommy Baldwin Jr. 14; Peter Sospenzo 12	14
Chevrolet	Premium Motorsports	27	Ross Chastain	Tommy Baldwin Jr. 14; Peter Sospenzo 12	3
Chevrolet	Premium Motorsports	27	Quin Houff	Tommy Baldwin Jr. 14; Peter Sospenzo 12	3
Chevrolet	Premium Motorsports	27	Joe Nemechek	Tommy Baldwin Jr. 14; Peter Sospenzo 12	5
Chevrolet	Premium Motorsports	27	Ryan Sieg	Tommy Baldwin Jr. 14; Peter Sospenzo 12	1
Chevrolet	Richard Childress Racing	31	Tyler Reddick	Justin Alexander	2
Chevrolet	Tommy Baldwin Racing	71	Ryan Truex	Tommy Baldwin Jr.	1
Toyota	Gaunt Brothers Racing	96	Parker Kligerman	Mark Hillman	14
Toyota	Gaunt Brothers Racing	96	Drew Herring	Mark Hillman	1
Toyota	MBM Motorsports	46	Joey Gase	Mark Labretone	1
Toyota	MBM Motorsports	66	Joey Gase	Brian Keselowski 8 George Church 7 Ryan Bell 1	10
Toyota	MBM Motorsports	66	Timmy Hill	Brian Keselowski 8 George Church 7 Ryan Bell 1	6
Toyota	XCI Racing	81	Jeffrey Earnhardt	Jacob Canter	1
Chevrolet 9 Ford 6	Rick Ware Racing	53	B. J. McLeod	Lee Leslie 6 Jason Houghtaling 7 Mike Hillman Sr. 2	2
Chevrolet 9 Ford 6	Rick Ware Racing	53	Josh Bilicki	Lee Leslie 6 Jason Houghtaling 7 Mike Hillman Sr. 2	6
Chevrolet 9 Ford 6	Rick Ware Racing	53	Joey Gase	Lee Leslie 6 Jason Houghtaling 7 Mike Hillman Sr. 2	1
Chevrolet 9 Ford 6	Rick Ware Racing	53	Spencer Boyd	Lee Leslie 6 Jason Houghtaling 7 Mike Hillman Sr. 2	2
Chevrolet 9 Ford 6	Rick Ware Racing	53	J. J. Yeley	Lee Leslie 6 Jason Houghtaling 7 Mike Hillman Sr. 2	4
Chevrolet 2 Ford 2	Rick Ware Racing	54	J. J. Yeley	Jeff Spraker 1 Mike Hillman Sr. 1 Jason Houghtaling 2	2
Chevrolet 2 Ford 2	Rick Ware Racing	54	Garrett Smithley	Jeff Spraker 1 Mike Hillman Sr. 1 Jason Houghtaling 2	2

=== Changes ===
==== Teams ====
- On August 5, 2018, Leavine Family Racing announced that their technical alliance with Richard Childress Racing would end after the 2018 season. On October 9, 2018, LFR announced they would enter a technical alliance with Joe Gibbs Racing in 2019.
- On August 23, 2018, Front Row Motorsports purchased majority of the assets of the bankrupt BK Racing for US$2.08 million. With this purchase, FRM would field a third team in the 2019 season. The third team was formally announced on November 27, 2018, as the No. 36 Ford driven by Matt Tifft.
- On September 3, 2018, Obaika Racing announced that they would run a few races in the Cup series in 2018, before moving to full-time in 2019. On February 8, 2019, Obaika Racing withdrew from the 2019 Daytona 500 qualifying due to various circumstances.
- On September 4, 2018, Furniture Row Racing announced that they would close their doors following the 2018 season.
- On November 16, 2018, Timmy Hill announced that MBM Motorsports would attempt to enter two teams at the 2019 Daytona 500, with Hill driving the No. 66 Toyota.
- On November 26, 2018, Tommy Baldwin Racing announced their rebirth, and that they would run the Daytona 500 and select other races.
- On November 27, 2018, Rick Ware Racing hinted they would field a second team in 2019. The existing No. 51 team is using a charter leased from Richard Petty Motorsports and is officially registered as "Petty Ware Racing". On December 21, 2018, the team confirmed that they purchased a charter from Front Row Motorsports for their No. 52 team. In addition, the team purchased a fleet of Ford stock cars from FRM and Chevrolet stock cars from Leavine Family Racing, which switched to Toyota.
- On December 4, 2018, it was announced that sponsorship agency Spire Sports + Entertainment purchased the charter previously owned by Furniture Row Racing. The new team, Spire Motorsports, would field the No. 77 Chevrolet in the 2019 season. A driver, crew chief, technical alliance, or sponsor were not announced at that time.
- During Richard Childress Racing's 50th anniversary press conference on December 14, 2018, it was announced that the No. 31 would change to the No. 8 for 2019, the same car Daniel Hemric made his first two Cup starts in during the 2018 season. In addition, RCR announced that the charter they were leasing to StarCom Racing has been sold to the team.
- With StarCom Racing buying the 36th and final charter from Richard Childress Racing, TriStar Motorsports is left without a full-time charter for 2019.
- On December 17, 2018, StarCom Racing announced that they have moved to a new facility based in Salisbury, North Carolina, and upgraded their engine deal with ECR Engines.
- On February 5, 2019, Germain Racing announced that they would field a second team at the 2019 Daytona 500. The No. 27 Chevrolet was built and staffed in collaboration with Premium Motorsports owner Jay Robinson.
- On February 14, 2019, Xtreme Concepts Inc. announced that it has formed XCI Racing and would field the No. 81 Toyota at both Talladega races. The team has a technical alliance with Joe Gibbs Racing.
- On May 23, 2019, Rick Ware Racing announced they would field a third team at the Coca-Cola 600 in the form of the No. 53 Chevrolet driven by B. J. McLeod.
- On June 13, 2019, Nationwide Mutual Insurance Company announced the end of their four-year sponsorship of Hendrick Motorsports' No. 88 team driven by Alex Bowman after the 2019 season.
- On August 9, 2019, Rick Ware Racing announced they would field a fourth team at the Bass Pro Shops NRA Night Race in the form of the No. 54 Chevrolet driven by J. J. Yeley.

==== Drivers ====
- On August 16, 2018, it was announced that Kasey Kahne would be retiring from full-time racing following the 2018 season.
- On September 4, 2018, it was announced that the No. 78 Furniture Row Racing team would fold, leaving Martin Truex Jr. a free agent for 2019. On November 7, 2018, it was announced that Truex would join Joe Gibbs Racing in 2019 to replace Daniel Suárez in the No. 19 team.
- On September 7, 2018, it was announced that Matt DiBenedetto would not return to Go Fas Racing in 2019.
- On September 10, 2018, it was announced that Jamie McMurray would not return to Chip Ganassi Racing in 2019. CGR had offered McMurray a contract to drive at the 2019 Daytona 500 before moving to a leadership position with the team. On December 12, 2018, Fox Sports announced that McMurray has joined its Fox NASCAR broadcast team as an analyst for NASCAR RaceDay and NASCAR Race Hub starting in 2019.
- On September 12, 2018, it was announced that Trevor Bayne would not return to Roush Fenway Racing in 2019. On October 7, 2018, Matt Kenseth, who shared the No. 6 Ford with Bayne, announced he has no plans to race after the 2018 season.
- On September 15, 2018, it was announced that Ryan Newman would not return to Richard Childress Racing in 2019. Later on September 21, 2018, it was confirmed that Newman would move to Roush Fenway Racing in the No. 6 full-time, replacing Bayne and Kenseth.
- On September 25, 2018, it was announced that A. J. Allmendinger will not return to JTG Daugherty Racing in 2019. Three days later, it was announced that Ryan Preece will take over the No. 47 car and compete for 2019 Rookie of the Year honors. Meanwhile, Allmendinger would join the NBC Sports booth as an analyst for IMSA events and would also contribute to NASCAR America.
- On September 28, 2018, it was announced that Daniel Hemric would replace Ryan Newman in the No. 31 (now the No. 8) for Richard Childress Racing and compete for 2019 Rookie of the Year honors.
- On October 6, 2018, it was announced that Ross Chastain would be returning to the No. 15 Premium Motorsports Chevrolet on a 'handshake deal'. Team owner Jay Robinson states he would not hold back Chastain if a better opportunity presents itself.
- On October 10, 2018, Leavine Family Racing announced that Matt DiBenedetto has signed a two-year contract to drive the No. 95 Toyota.
- On November 12, 2018, Cole Whitt announced his retirement from competing in NASCAR following the 2018 season with TriStar Motorsports.
- On November 27, 2018, Front Row Motorsports announced that Matt Tifft will drive the No. 36 Ford and compete for 2019 Rookie of the Year honors. On October 26, 2019, prior to the 2019 First Data 500 at Martinsville Speedway, Tifft was rushed to the hospital while Matt Crafton took over the No. 36 for the race weekend. On October 29, Tifft revealed that he blacked out and suffered a seizure in the team's hauler. Because of this, he will miss the rest of the season while John Hunter Nemechek takes over the No. 36 for the final three races.
- On December 2, 2018, Kurt Busch announced that he will not return to Stewart–Haas Racing in 2019. On December 4, 2018, it was announced that Busch and sponsor Monster Energy signed a one-year deal with Chip Ganassi Racing to drive the No. 1 Chevrolet. It is also believed that 2019 will be Busch's final year of full-time NASCAR competition, unless his season works out particularly well and he and Chip Ganassi would revisit an option for 2020.
- On December 3, 2018, Obaika Racing announced that Tanner Berryhill will run full-time in the No. 97 Toyota and compete for Rookie of the Year honors.
- On December 17, 2018, StarCom Racing announced Landon Cassill as their full-time driver for the 2019 season.
- On December 17, 2018, it was announced that Corey LaJoie would be driving for Go Fas Racing full-time for the 2019 season.
- On January 7, 2019, it was announced that Daniel Suárez will drive the Stewart–Haas Racing No. 41 Ford in 2019.
- On January 16, 2019, it was announced that Ryan Truex would return to the MENCS to drive the Tommy Baldwin Racing No. 71 for the Daytona 500.
- On January 16, 2019, MBM Motorsports announced that Joey Gase would attempt to run 90 percent of the full 2019 race schedule in the No. 66 car.
- On January 16, 2019, Rick Ware Racing announced plans to have Mike Wallace drive the No. 52 car at Atlanta, Auto Club and Las Vegas with the possibility of additional races. However, it seemed that the deal fell apart as Cody Ware, B. J. McLeod, Bayley Currey, Gray Gaulding, Stanton Barrett, J. J. Yeley, Kyle Weatherman, Josh Bilicki, Andy Seuss, Austin Theriault, Joey Gase, Spencer Boyd, Garrett Smithley, and Jeb Burton have shared the No. 51, No. 52, No. 53, and No. 54 cars.
- On January 18, 2019, Spire Motorsports announced that Jamie McMurray would pilot their No. 40 Chevrolet at the 2019 Advance Auto Parts Clash and the Daytona 500 with backing from Cessna, Bass Pro Shops, and McDonald's for the team's first NASCAR start and McMurray's final race. The car will be renumbered as the No. 77 after the Daytona 500.
- On January 22, 2019, it was announced that Quin Houff will drive the Spire Motorsports No. 77 Chevrolet part-time in 2019, starting with the 2019 TicketGuardian 500 at ISM Raceway on March 10. On February 18, 2019, it was announced that Garrett Smithley will drive the No. 77 at Atlanta. On February 27, 2019, Reed Sorenson was announced to drive the No. 77 at Las Vegas. On March 21, 2019, D. J. Kennington was announced to drive the No. 77 at Martinsville. On April 23, 2019, Justin Haley was announced to drive the No. 77 in his Cup debut at the April Talladega race. On September 29, 2019, Blake Jones was announced to drive the No. 77 at the October Talladega race.
- On January 25, 2019, it was announced that Cody Ware would drive the Rick Ware Racing No. 51 Chevrolet at the Daytona 500.
- On February 1, 2019, Richard Childress Racing announced that Tyler Reddick would attempt to run the Daytona 500 in the No. 31 Chevrolet.
- On February 5, 2019, Germain Racing announced they would field a second entry for Casey Mears in the No. 27 Chevrolet for the Daytona 500.
- On February 14, 2019, XCI Racing announced that Jeffrey Earnhardt would drive the No. 81 Toyota for both of the Talladega races in 2019. On August 7, 2019, Earnhardt announced that he parted ways with sponsor and XCI affiliate iK9, as well as Joe Gibbs Racing. It has yet to be announced whether the No. 81 XCI team will still run Talladega in October with another driver.
- On May 21, 2019, it was announced that B. J. McLeod would drive the Rick Ware Racing No. 53 car at the Coca-Cola 600.
- On June 28, 2019, it was announced that Andy Seuss would make his MENCS debut with Rick Ware Racing in the team's No. 51 entry at New Hampshire.
- On June 29, 2019, it was announced that Austin Theriault would make his MENCS debut with Rick Ware Racing in the team's No. 52 entry at New Hampshire.
- On August 7, 2019, Rick Ware Racing announced that Spencer Boyd will make his MENCS debut in the No. 53 car at the August Michigan race.
- On August 15, 2019, Bayley Currey was indefinitely suspended for violating NASCAR's Substance Abuse Policy. He was set to drive the Rick Ware Racing No. 52 at the Bristol Night Race. Kyle Weatherman would be his substitute replacement for that race. On September 18, Currey was reinstated by NASCAR after he successfully completed his Road to Recovery Program.

==== Crew chiefs ====
- On September 4, 2018, it was announced that the No. 78 Furniture Row Racing team will fold, leaving Cole Pearn a free agent for 2019. On November 7, 2018, it was announced that Pearn would join Martin Truex Jr. in the Joe Gibbs Racing No. 19 team in 2019.
- On October 10, 2018, Hendrick Motorsports announced that starting in 2019, Chad Knaus will move to the No. 24 team to become William Byron's crew chief while Kevin Meendering from JR Motorsports will become Jimmie Johnson's crew chief. Darian Grubb, who served as Byron's crew chief in 2018, will remain at Hendrick Motorsports but as a technical director for the organization.
- On October 23, 2018, Roush Fenway Racing announced that former Joe Gibbs Racing crew chief Scott Graves will replace Matt Puccia as the crew chief of the No. 6 team driven by Ryan Newman. RFR is working on a future role for Puccia.
- On November 16, 2018, Denny Hamlin tweeted that he will be parting ways with crew chief Mike Wheeler at the end of the 2018 season. On December 6, 2018, Joe Gibbs Racing announced that Chris Gabehart from the Xfinity Series has been appointed as the new crew chief of the No. 11 team.
- On November 26, 2018, it was announced that Danny Stockman would replace Justin Alexander as Austin Dillon's crew chief in the 2019 season. Stockman previously served as the crew chief in Dillon's Camping World Truck Series and Nationwide Series seasons.
- On November 27, 2018, Leavine Family Racing announced that Mike Wheeler will be the No. 95 team's crew chief in 2019.
- On January 14, 2019, it was announced that former Richard Petty Motorsports crew chief Drew Blickensderfer will move to Front Row Motorsports as the crew chief of the No. 34 Ford driven by Michael McDowell.
- On January 15, 2019, StarCom Racing announced that Wayne Carroll will serve as crew chief of the No. 00 team. Tony Furr, who served as crew chief of the No. 00 team last season, will move to Mullins Racing in the ARCA Racing Series.
- On January 31, 2019, Richard Petty Motorsports announced that lead engineer Derek Stamets has been promoted to the crew chief of the No. 43 Chevrolet driven by Bubba Wallace.
- On February 5, 2019, Germain Racing announced that Pat Tryson will be the crew chief of the No. 27 Chevrolet driven by Casey Mears at the 2019 Daytona 500.
- On July 23, 2019, Front Row Motorsports announced that crew chief Mike Kelly of the No. 36 will switch to the No. 38 Ford driven by David Ragan, while Seth Barbour will transfer from the No. 38 to the No. 36 Ford driven by Matt Tifft for the remainder of the season.
- On July 29, 2019, Hendrick Motorsports announced that race engineer Cliff Daniels will replace Kevin Meendering as the crew chief of the No. 48 Chevrolet driven by Jimmie Johnson for the remainder of the season.
- On August 26, 2019, Matt Borland, the crew chief of the Germain Racing No. 13 Chevrolet of Ty Dillon, was indefinitely suspended for violating NASCAR's Substance Abuse Policy. Germain Racing confirmed that Justin Alexander, who serves as crew chief for the part-time No. 21 Xfinity Series car for Richard Childress Racing (who Germain has an alliance with), would serve as interim crew chief beginning at Darlington and until Borland's suspension is lifted. On September 24, NASCAR reinstated Borland after he completed the Road to Recovery Program.
- On October 11, 2019, JTG Daugherty Racing announced that team engineer Eddie Pardue would replace Tristan Smith as the crew chief of the No. 47 Chevrolet driven by Ryan Preece for the remaining six races of the season. Smith, meanwhile, will move to an engineer position.

==== Manufacturers ====
- With the discontinuation of the Fusion after the 2018 model year, Ford unveiled a new body style based on the Mustang GT.
- On October 10, 2018, Leavine Family Racing announced their switch from Chevrolet to Toyota in the 2019 season.

== Rule changes ==
=== 2019 package ===
- On October 2, 2018, NASCAR announced the new rules package for the 2019 season. The new package will have a smaller tapered spacer which will reduce the engine's power from 750 bhp (560 kW) to 550 bhp (410 kW) for tracks that are larger than 1 mile (1.6 km) to foster tighter racing. This will also include a taller spoiler at 8 in (200 mm) by 61 in (1,500 mm), a wider radiator pan with 37 in (940 mm) at the front and 31 in (790 mm) at the rear, and a larger splitter with an overhang of 2 inches (51 mm).
- Along with the aerodynamic changes, all current restrictor plate races except for the 2019 Daytona 500 will no longer be using the traditional restrictor plate rules and instead will be using the new 2019 package with the effect of the aerodynamic changes and engine restrictions, which makes it the first time a race at Daytona or Talladega to race without the traditional restrictor plates since 1987.
- At the same time, NASCAR will be reducing the number of organizational tests for the year from four to three, and Goodyear tests will also be reduced from four teams to three.
- On October 8, 2018, NASCAR announced that the driver-adjustable trackbar will not be allowed in the 2019 season.
- On February 4, 2019, NASCAR announced a new post-race inspection rule in all three series, where race-winning teams found to be in violation of the rule book will automatically be disqualified. Following a race, the first-place and second-place teams, along with at least one randomly selected car, will undergo post-race inspection. The inspection should take between 90 minutes and two hours to complete before the race winner is officially declared. The car that fails the inspection will receive last-place points and will be stripped of playoff and stage points.
  - At the 2019 Federated Auto Parts 400 at Richmond Raceway on September 21, 2019, Erik Jones became the first MENCS driver to be disqualified under this rule after his fourth-place finishing car was discovered to have a rear wheel alignment issue during post-race inspection. As a result, he was scored back to 38th place with one point, severely affecting his playoff standings.
- For the 2019 Monster Energy NASCAR All-Star Race, NASCAR implemented two new components to the aero package: a single-piece carbon fiber splitter and a hood-mounted radiator duct.

=== Qualifying ===
- On February 4, 2019, NASCAR announced a change in the qualifying schedule procedures for majority of its tracks. For short tracks and intermediate speedways, the first round would be shortened from 15 minutes to 10 minutes, while the second and third rounds would remain at 10 and five minutes, respectively. The down time intervals at all tracks would be reduced from seven minutes to five minutes. Superspeedway qualifications would retain their untimed two-round intervals of single-lap qualifying while road courses would continue to use two qualifying rounds: 25 minutes for the first round and 10 minutes for the final round.
- For the first several races on speedway tracks running the new rules package, cars started waiting until the last possible moment to record a lap to avoid being the first car out (which is a disadvantage in speed when drafting) during qualifying. On March 25, 2019, following Auto Club Speedway qualifying where no cars recorded a timed lap in round 3, NASCAR announced starting at the first Texas race any drive who did not record a lap in any round would not have previous session times count and would start from the rear of the field. Additionally, any driver who blocked pit road in a manner prohibiting drivers from exiting pit road would be disqualified. Further, any car not immediately making a qualifying attempt would be staged in a track-specific area designated by NASCAR. Once leaving that area the car would need to continue directly onto the race track at full speed.
- For the April Richmond race, NASCAR shortened the length of each session to five minutes for Richmond only.
- On May 1, 2019, following continued gamesmanship and other actions causing multi-car qualifying to become "untenable," NASCAR formally returned to single-car qualifying at all oval tracks.
  - At oval tracks 1.25 miles (2.01 km) and larger, each car would get a single timed lap.
  - At oval tracks 1.25 miles (2.01 km) and smaller, each car would get two timed laps with the faster lap counting as their official time.
  - The qualifying order draw would be determined in part by the previous race's starting lineup. The top 20 starters from the previous race would draw to take their qualifying lap in positions 21-40 (the second half of qualifying). The remainder of cars would draw to qualify in positions 1-20.
  - The next car would be sent once the preceding car took the white flag. This would ensure qualifying was completed in roughly 40 minutes, barring any interruptions for crashes, debris, or weather.
  - There would be two-minute television breaks built into qualifying to ensure every car would get covered live during the session.
  - Each car would need to complete their lap for the session to be counted, otherwise all times would be erased and cars would start by owner points.
  - Multi-car qualifying would remain at road course events.
  - On-air, Fox reintroduced a new graphics system it used during the Daytona 500 qualifying, to render a live augmented reality "ghost" alongside the car currently running, typically reflecting the leader.

=== Other ===
- On May 8, 2019, NASCAR announced that for the 2019 Coca-Cola 600, the race would stop after the second stage for a 30-second moment of remembrance in honor of Memorial Day.

== Schedule ==
The 2019 dates and venues were released on April 3, 2018, and the start times on December 11, 2018. There were no schedule changes from the 2018 season, except to move the summer Las Vegas race to prime time (7pm ET). The Sonoma Raceway returned to the original 2.52 mile course configuration for the first time since 1997; otherwise the venues were unchanged.

No	Race title	Track	Location	Date	Time (ET)
	Advance Auto Parts Clash	Daytona International Speedway	Daytona Beach, Florida	February 10	3:00 PM
	Gander RV Duel	Daytona International Speedway	Daytona Beach, Florida	February 14	7:00 PM
1	**Daytona 500**	Daytona International Speedway	Daytona Beach, Florida	February 17	2:30 PM
2	Folds of Honor QuikTrip 500	Atlanta Motor Speedway	Hampton, Georgia	February 24	2:00 PM
3	Pennzoil 400 presented by Jiffy Lube	Las Vegas Motor Speedway	Las Vegas, Nevada	March 3	3:30 PM
4	TicketGuardian 500	ISM Raceway	Avondale, Arizona	March 10	3:30 PM
5	Auto Club 400	Auto Club Speedway	Fontana, California	March 17	3:30 PM
6	STP 500	Martinsville Speedway	Ridgeway, Virginia	March 24	2:00 PM
7	O'Reilly Auto Parts 500	Texas Motor Speedway	Fort Worth, Texas	March 31	3:00 PM
8	Food City 500	Bristol Motor Speedway	Bristol, Tennessee	April 7	2:00 PM
9	Toyota Owners 400	Richmond Raceway	Richmond, Virginia	April 13	7:30 PM
10	GEICO 500	Talladega Superspeedway	Lincoln, Alabama	April 28	2:00 PM
11	Gander RV 400	Dover International Speedway	Dover, Delaware	May 6 (Note: The Spring Dover Race was postponed to Monday, May 6, due to rain.)	12:00 PM
12	Digital Ally 400	Kansas Speedway	Kansas City, Kansas	May 11	7:30 PM
	Monster Energy Open	Charlotte Motor Speedway	Concord, North Carolina	May 18	6:00 PM
	Monster Energy NASCAR All-Star Race	Charlotte Motor Speedway	Concord, North Carolina	May 18	8:00 PM
13	**Coca-Cola 600**	Charlotte Motor Speedway	Concord, North Carolina	May 26	6:00 PM
14	Pocono 400	Pocono Raceway	Long Pond, Pennsylvania	June 2	2:00 PM
15	FireKeepers Casino 400	Michigan International Speedway	Cambridge Township, Michigan	June 10 (Note: The Spring Michigan Race was postponed to Monday, June 10, due to rain.)	5:00 PM
16	Toyota/Save Mart 350	Sonoma Raceway	Sonoma, California	June 23	3:00 PM
17	Camping World 400	Chicagoland Speedway	Joliet, Illinois	June 30	3:00 PM
18	Coke Zero Sugar 400	Daytona International Speedway	Daytona Beach, Florida	July 7 (Note: The July Daytona Race was postponed to Sunday, July 7, due to rain.)	1:00 PM
19	Quaker State 400 presented by Walmart	Kentucky Speedway	Sparta, Kentucky	July 13	7:30 PM
20	Foxwoods Resort Casino 301	New Hampshire Motor Speedway	Loudon, New Hampshire	July 21	3:00 PM
21	Gander RV 400	Pocono Raceway	Long Pond, Pennsylvania	July 28	3:00 PM
22	Go Bowling at The Glen	Watkins Glen International	Watkins Glen, New York	August 4	3:00 PM
23	Consumers Energy 400	Michigan International Speedway	Cambridge Township, Michigan	August 11	3:00 PM
24	Bass Pro Shops NRA Night Race	Bristol Motor Speedway	Bristol, Tennessee	August 17	7:30 PM
25	**Bojangles' Southern 500**	Darlington Raceway	Darlington, South Carolina	September 1	6:00 PM
26	**Big Machine Vodka 400 at the Brickyard**	Indianapolis Motor Speedway	Speedway, Indiana	September 8	2:00 PM
Monster Energy NASCAR Cup Series Playoffs
Round of 16
27	South Point 400	Las Vegas Motor Speedway	Las Vegas, Nevada	September 15	7:00 PM
28	Federated Auto Parts 400	Richmond Raceway, Richmond, Virginia	Richmond, Virginia	September 21	7:30 PM
29	Bank of America Roval 400	Charlotte Motor Speedway (Roval)	Concord, North Carolina	September 29	2:30 PM
Round of 12
30	Drydene 400	Dover International Speedway, Dover, Delaware	Dover, Delaware	October 6	2:30 PM
31	1000Bulbs.com 500	Talladega Superspeedway	Lincoln, Alabama	October 13–14 (Note: The October Talladega Race was stopped at Lap 57 on Sunday, due to rain. The race was completed the following day.)	2:00 PM
32	Hollywood Casino 400	Kansas Speedway	Kansas City, Kansas	October 20	2:30 PM
Round of 8
33	First Data 500	Martinsville Speedway	Ridgeway, Virginia	October 27	3:00 PM
34	AAA Texas 500	Texas Motor Speedway	Fort Worth, Texas	November 3	3:00 PM
35	Bluegreen Vacations 500	ISM Raceway	Avondale, Arizona	November 10	2:30 PM
Championship 4
36	Ford EcoBoost 400	Homestead–Miami Speedway	Homestead, Florida	November 17	3:00 PM

Bolded races indicate a NASCAR Major also known as Crown Jewel race

== Season summary ==
=== Race reports ===
Speedweeks 2019

In Daytona 500 qualifying, William Byron won the pole while Alex Bowman qualified second. This was the fifth consecutive Daytona 500 pole won by Hendrick Motorsports and the first with all four cars in the top 4.

Daytona Speedweeks started with the Advance Auto Parts Clash, with Paul Menard drawing the pole and leading the most laps. The race went under a red flag after the first few laps due to rain. The race returned to green and then the field pitted for the competition caution followed by another red flag for rain. After the restart, Jimmie Johnson spun Menard, resulting in "The Big One" that claimed most of the field including Kyle Busch, Brad Keselowski, Kevin Harvick, and Clint Bowyer. The race went red again due to rain during the caution and it was called, giving the win to Johnson.

In the Duels on Thursday, Byron led the first Duel. Kyle Busch spun after making contact with Johnson. Harvick took the lead after pit stops and held off Ricky Stenhouse Jr. for the win. In the second duel, Bowman started in the lead. Joey Logano made a last lap pass on Bowyer to win.

Round 1: Daytona 500

William Byron started on pole. Kyle Busch won the first stage while Kurt Busch spun. Ryan Blaney won the second stage. Cody Ware spun when coming to pit road and collected Tyler Reddick and Jimmie Johnson. Kyle Larson and Brad Keselowski both spun after tire issues. Matt DiBenedetto led the most laps, but was involved in an accident with Blaney, Paul Menard, Chase Elliott, Martin Truex Jr., and others. On the restart, Clint Bowyer got turned and collected Byron, Austin Dillon, Ryan Newman, and others. In overtime, Denny Hamlin was able to hold off teammate Kyle Busch for his second Daytona 500 win in four years.

Round 2: Folds of Honor QuikTrip 500

Aric Almirola started on pole. Kyle Larson won the first stage while Kevin Harvick won the second stage. Some top runners including Almirola, Larson, and Ricky Stenhouse Jr. had speeding penalties. Kyle Busch got into the wall and had a tire go down. During the final round of green flag pit stops, Ryan Preece ran into the back of B. J. McLeod. Brad Keselowski, battling the flu, took the lead from teammate Joey Logano and held off Martin Truex Jr. for his second Atlanta win and his 60th win overall at Team Penske across Cup and Xfinity.

Round 3: Pennzoil 400

Kevin Harvick started on pole. Kyle Larson and Austin Dillon suffered pit road penalties in the first stage during green flag stops. Harvick won the first stage of the race. In the second stage, Kyle Busch had a speeding penalty while making a pit stop under green flag. Joey Logano won the second stage of the race. In the final stage, Logano held off teammate Brad Keselowski to win the race.

Round 4: TicketGuardian 500

Ryan Blaney started the race from pole position. In the first stage, Erik Jones spun from a flat tire and Brad Keselowski hit the wall after an issue in the right front of the car caused a tire to go down. Blaney won the first stage of the race and Kyle Busch won the second stage of the race. In the final stage, Michael McDowell and Ryan Preece were involved in wrecks while Matt DiBenedetto had a mechanical issue. Blaney was leading late in the race until Kyle Busch passed him with 17 laps to go. Kyle Busch went on to win the race, his first win of the season, and completed a weekend sweep, having won the Xfinity Series race the day before.

Round 5: Auto Club 400

Austin Dillon started the race on pole. Toward the end of the first stage, Austin Dillon had a tire go down. Kyle Busch went on to win the first stage and the second stage of the race. Kyle Busch had a pit road speeding penalty at the end of the second stage, giving the lead to Brad Keselowski. In the final stage of the race, Bubba Wallace brought out a caution during a round of green-flag pit stops, putting Kyle Busch back toward the front. Kyle Busch took the lead and would go on to win his second straight race and 200th race across all three national series, tying the record set by Richard Petty.

Round 6: STP 500

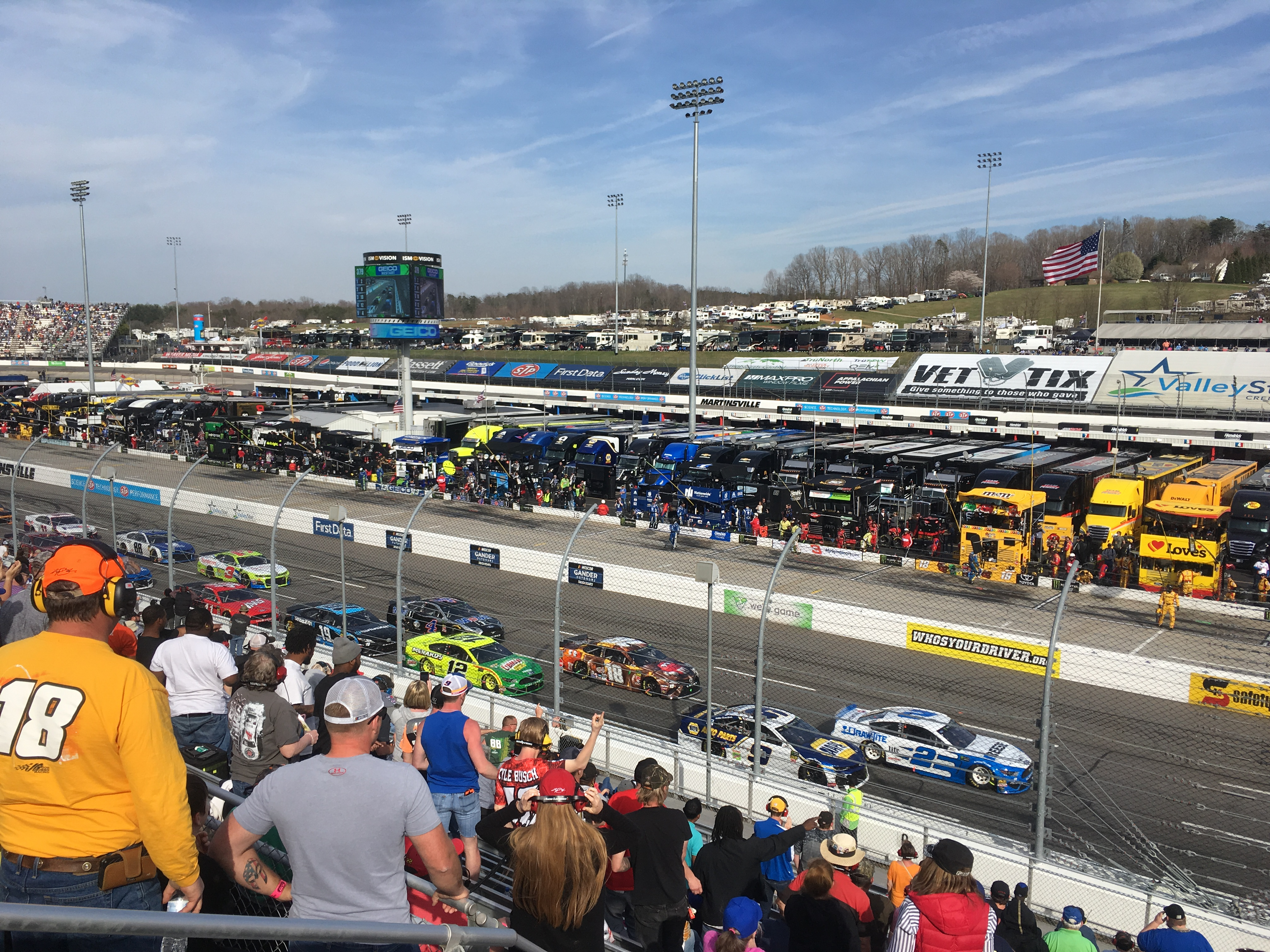
Brad Keselowski leads the STP 500 at Martinsville Speedway in March

Joey Logano started on pole. Michael McDowell got into the wall and Ty Dillon and William Byron got together. Kyle Larson got into McDowell, ending the day for McDowell. Brad Keselowski won both stages and dominated, leading 446 laps and holding off Chase Elliott for his second win of the season and second at Martinsville.

Round 7: O'Reilly Auto Parts 500

Jimmie Johnson started on pole. Erik Jones spun early as Brad Keselowski had to go to the garage for several laps due to rear-end issues. Johnson led most of the stage. Joey Logano was able to get the lead off pit road and win the first stage. Daniel Hemric had a tire go down and spun and Kyle Larson slammed the wall and caught on fire. Denny Hamlin was able to get the lead off pit road and won the second stage. Ryan Blaney had led until his engine expired. Kyle Busch led the most laps, but got loose and got into the wall and had to go to pit road. Hamlin, who suffered back-to-back pit road penalties, was able to get back in the lead after the final round of green-flag pit stops and held off Clint Bowyer for his second win of the season.

Round 8: Food City 500

Chase Elliott started the race on pole while Kevin Harvick had to start from the rear and serve a pass-through penalty for failing pre-race inspection. At the beginning of the race, Ricky Stenhouse Jr. got into Kyle Busch and sent him spinning, with Aric Almirola also involved in the wreck. Ty Dillon won the first stage while Joey Logano won the second stage. Ryan Blaney led the most laps in the race. Elliott was spun from contact from behind toward the end of the second stage and lost power steering. In the final stage, Kyle Larson made contact with another car and got in a wreck with William Byron, Denny Hamlin got a pit road speeding penalty while leading, and Clint Bowyer cut a tire and got into the wall. During a late caution, most of the leaders came to pit road while a few cars stayed out, giving the lead to Kyle Busch. Kyle Busch held off his older brother Kurt Busch to win the race, his third win of the season and eighth at Bristol.

Round 9: Toyota Owners 400

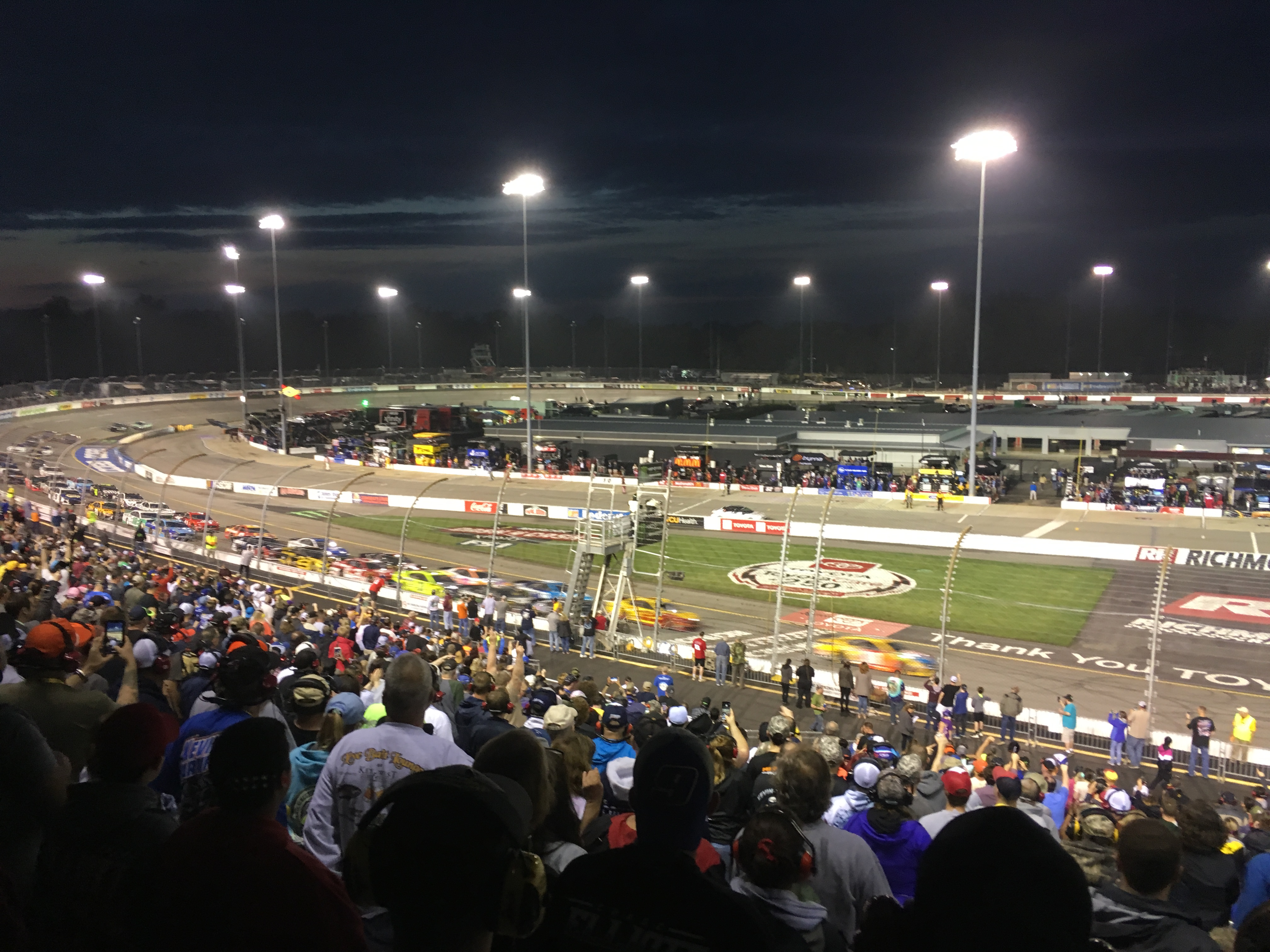
Kyle Busch leads the Toyota Owners 400 at Richmond Raceway in April

Kevin Harvick started on pole. Harvick led early, but Kyle Busch took the lead and won the first stage. Kyle Larson spun and slammed the wall. Joey Logano would take the lead and win the second stage. Michael McDowell had a tire go down and slammed the wall. Martin Truex Jr. took the lead and led the most laps. Clint Bowyer was able to catch Truex and take the lead, but Truex regained the lead after the final round of green-flag pit stops. Bowyer got to Truex's bumper and tried to take the lead, but was unable to and lost second to Logano. Truex continued to lead with Logano on his bumper and Truex was able to hold on for his first career short-track win in his first of the season.

Round 10: GEICO 500

Austin Dillon started on pole. Bubba Wallace spun and collected Michael McDowell, Matt Tifft, Clint Bowyer, Denny Hamlin, Ryan Newman, and Kevin Harvick. Most of the top runners had to pit, giving the lead to Ty Dillon, who won his second stage win. Chase Elliott won the second stage and led the most laps. Chris Buescher spun and collected Justin Haley and Martin Truex Jr., which brought out the red flag. On the restart, Ricky Stenhouse Jr. slammed the wall and then David Ragan and William Byron got together and collected Jeffrey Earnhardt and Kyle Larson, who went airborne and barrel-rolled down the back straightaway. Chase Elliott was out front of teammate Alex Bowman when the caution came out, giving Elliott his and Chevrolet's first win of the season.

Round 11: Gander RV 400

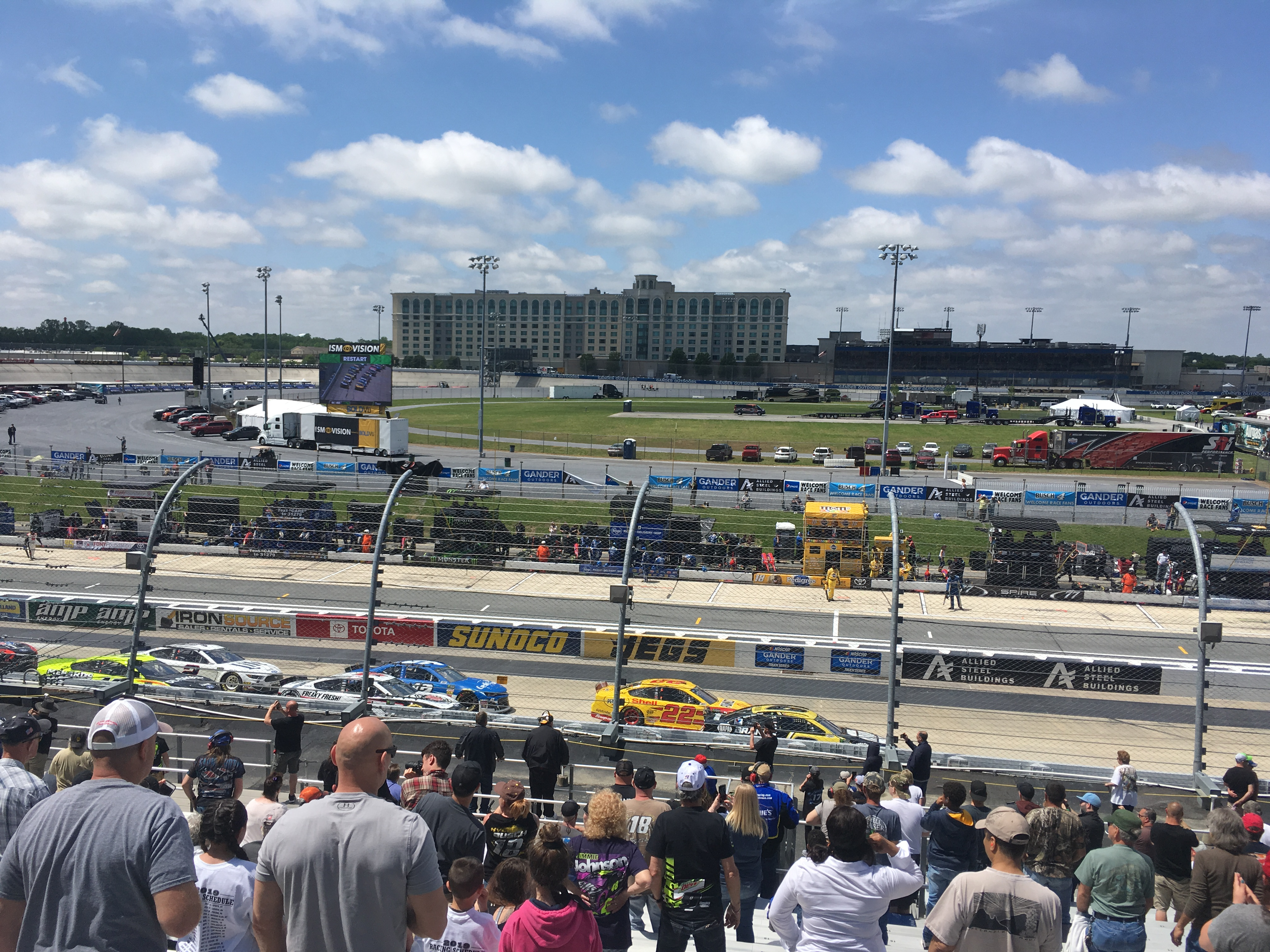
Polesitter Chase Elliott leads the Gander RV 400 at Dover International Speedway in May

The race was postponed from Sunday to Monday due to rain. Chase Elliott started on pole and dominated, leading the most laps. Joey Logano won the first stage while Martin Truex Jr. passed Alex Bowman to win the second stage. Truex continued to lead and pulled away from Bowman for his second win of the season.

Round 12: Digital Ally 400

Kevin Harvick started on pole. Denny Hamlin had a tire go down and got into the wall. Harvick won the first stage and Chase Elliott passed Harvick and won the second stage. Ryan Blaney got in the wall and had a tire go down, but made it to pit road. Harvick had to go to pit road due to a tire going down. Alex Bowman took the lead from Elliott and was heading to the win, but lost the lead to Brad Keselowski. Kyle Busch had a tire rub and had to pit while Matt DiBenedetto had an engine blow up, sending the race into overtime. Keselowski held off a charging Bowman for his third win of the season.

Exhibition: Monster Energy NASCAR All-Star Race

In the Monster Energy Open, Daniel Hemric started on pole. William Byron won the first stage to advance to the All-Star Race in a close overtime finish against Bubba Wallace In the second stage, Hemric and Ryan Preece wrecked and brought an overtime finish. Wallace Jr. won the second stage to advance to the All-Star Race in a close finish against Daniel Suárez, who went spinning through the grass. In the final stage, Kyle Larson passed Ty Dillon to win the race and advance to the All-Star Race. Alex Bowman won the fan vote to get into the All-Star Race.

Clint Bowyer started on pole for the All-Star Race. Kyle Busch won the first stage, Kevin Harvick won the second stage, and Joey Logano won the third stage. Several drivers had issues during the race, including Erik Jones, who got into the wall multiple times, and Denny Hamlin, who went for a spin after cutting a tire. In the final stage, Larson, who raced into the All-Star Race through the Monster Energy Open, got a push from Harvick to take the lead and win the All-Star Race, holding off Harvick and Kyle Busch.

Round 13: Coca-Cola 600

William Byron started on pole, becoming the youngest Coke 600 pole winner. Erik Jones, Matt DiBenedetto, and Martin Truex Jr. had tire issues, sending them into the wall. Kyle Busch made contact with Ricky Stenhouse Jr., who spun. Daniel Hemric got into Clint Bowyer as Brad Keselowski won the first stage. Drivers had tire issues including Chris Buescher, Denny Hamlin, and Ryan Preece. Keselowski won the second stage. Bayley Currey slammed the wall after contact with Truex, who won the third stage. Kurt Busch got loose and spun into brother Kyle Busch. Kyle Larson got loose on the backstraightaway and spun, collecting Austin Dillon, Ty Dillon, Bowyer, and Preece. Hamlin cut a tire and slammed the wall and Keselowski spun coming to pit road. On the restart, Hamlin spun and slammed the wall while Martin Truex Jr. held off Joey Logano for his third win of the season and his second Coke 600.

Round 14: Pocono 400

William Byron started on pole for the second straight week and led until the competition caution. Austin Dillon made contact with Paul Menard and got into the wall. Kyle Larson took the lead off pit road and won the first stage. Matt DiBenedetto and Matt Tifft spun while Corey Lajoie got into the wall. Larson took back the lead to win the second stage. Kevin Harvick got the lead after green flag pit stops, but had an uncontrolled tire penalty, giving the lead to Kyle Busch. Ricky Stenhouse Jr. had a tire go down and slammed the wall. On the restart, Larson got into the wall and had to pit. Busch held off Brad Keselowski for his fourth win of the season and his third at Pocono.

Round 15: FireKeepers Casino 400

The race was postponed from Sunday to Monday due to rain. Joey Logano started on pole. Logano held off Alex Bowman to win the first stage. The leaders pitted for fuel as Austin Dillon stayed out to win the second stage over Kevin Harvick. Clint Bowyer spun and slammed the wall after contact with Erik Jones. Jones had a tire go down, sending the race into overtime. Logano pulled away on the restart and held off Kurt Busch for his second win of the season and second at Michigan.

Round 16: Toyota/Save Mart 350

Kyle Larson started on pole. William Byron took the lead at the start and won the first stage. Several drivers spun including Clint Bowyer, Aric Almirola, and Paul Menard. Denny Hamlin stayed out during green flag pit stops and won the second stage. Martin Truex Jr. led the most laps and took the lead from Kyle Busch for his fourth win of the season, his third at Sonoma, and the first driver since Jeff Gordon to win consecutive Sonoma races.

Round 17: Camping World 400

Austin Dillon started on pole. Jimmie Johnson took the lead and a caution came out for rain in the area. The race was then red-flagged and the race resumed. Clint Bowyer and Kyle Busch got into the wall with flat tires bringing out the caution allowing Denny Hamlin to win the first stage. Kevin Harvick held off Chase Elliott to win the second stage. Harvick got loose and got in the wall and Bowyer spun after another flat tire. Alex Bowman took the lead and had a big gap on the field until Kyle Larson was able to run him down due to lapped traffic. Larson took the lead from Bowman, but Bowman retook the lead and held off Larson for his first career win.

Round 18: Coke Zero Sugar 400

Joey Logano started on pole after qualifying was canceled due to rain. The race was postponed from Saturday to Sunday due to rain. Logano won the first stage. Ricky Stenhouse Jr. spun and Kurt Busch spun in the wall. Brad Keselowski got into the wall and collected Kevin Harvick, Daniel Suárez, and Daniel Hemric. Austin Dillon won the second stage. Dillon got turned while leading collecting most of the field including Logano, Clint Bowyer, Kyle Busch, Alex Bowman, Martin Truex Jr., Stenhouse, Chase Elliott, and Denny Hamlin. During the caution, the field was brought down pit road due to lightning and rain caused the race to end under a red flag, thus giving Justin Haley the win as he was the leader for his first career Cup win in just his third start. Haley's win is also the first Cup series win by a non-Cup driver since Brian Vickers at New Hampshire in 2013.

Round 19: Quaker State 400

Daniel Suárez started on pole. Chase Elliott had a tire go down and Corey LaJoie and Landon Cassill spun. The Busch brothers dominated the majority of the race with Kurt winning the first stage and Kyle winning the second stage. Austin Dillon exited the race due to losing fourth gear. Jimmie Johnson had a tire go down and hit the wall before spinning. Joey Logano passed Kyle Busch for the lead and was heading to the win until Bubba Wallace had a tire go down and spun, sending the race to overtime. Kurt Busch held off brother Kyle for his first win of the season with Chip Ganassi Racing.

Round 20: Foxwoods Resort Casino 301

Brad Keselowski started on pole. Austin Dillon had a tire go down. Kyle Busch won the first stage and Daniel Suárez spun and collected Daniel Hemric. Ricky Stenhouse Jr. slammed the wall while battling Erik Jones. Clint Bowyer got in the wall after contact with Martin Truex Jr. Aric Almirola won the second stage as Chase Elliott and Jimmie Johnson had engine and power steering issues respectively. Austin Dillon had another tire issue. Kyle Larson spun after contact with Alex Bowman. Kyle Busch got in the wall and Larson again slammed the wall. Kevin Harvick held off Denny Hamlin on old tires for his first win of the year.

Round 21: Gander RV 400

Kevin Harvick started on pole. Brad Keselowski had to pit early after getting into the wall. Kyle Busch won the first stage. Chase Elliott had a flat tire and slammed the wall. Daniel Suárez and Ryan Blaney made contact, sending Blaney spinning as Jimmie Johnson won the second stage. Ryan Preece blew a tire and slammed the wall. Kurt Busch got into the wall and spun after contact with Ricky Stenhouse Jr. and collected Michael McDowell. Denny Hamlin saved enough fuel to hold off teammate Erik Jones in overtime for his third win of the season and fifth at Pocono.

Round 22: Go Bowling at The Glen

Chase Elliott started on pole. Kyle Busch spun early and made contact with William Byron as Elliott won the first stage. Bubba Wallace spun into the wall as Elliott won the second stage. Jimmie Johnson spun after contact with Ryan Blaney as Kyle Busch spun after contact from Wallace. Elliott continue to dominate and held off Martin Truex Jr. for his second win of the season and his second straight at Watkins Glen.

Round 23: Consumers Energy 400

Brad Keselowski started on pole. Jimmie Johnson slammed the wall as Martin Truex Jr. won the first stage. Keselowski had a flat tire and spun. Kyle Busch won the second stage as Aric Almirola, Austin Dillon, and Daniel Hemric spun. Ricky Stenhouse Jr. spun as Spencer Boyd spun in the wall. Kevin Harvick took the lead from Joey Logano and held off Denny Hamlin for his second win of the season and his second consecutive at this race.

Round 24: Bass Pro Shops NRA Night Race

Denny Hamlin started on pole. Austin Dillon had a tire go down and made contact with Jimmie Johnson. Kyle Larson edged pit Chase Elliott to win the first stage. Aric Almirola had tire issues and spun twice and Clint Bowyer spun. Kurt Busch edged Daniel Suárez to win the second stage. Alex Bowman had a tire go down and collected Joey Logano. Ryan Blaney got into the wall along with Michael McDowell, David Ragan, and Johnson. Matt DiBenedetto led the most laps, but Hamlin passed him for the lead to win for his fourth race of the season.

Round 25: Bojangles' Southern 500

William Byron won the pole, becoming the youngest Southern 500 pole winner. The race was delayed a few hours due to rain. Kurt Busch won the first stage. Ryan Newman spun after contact with Daniel Suárez. Joey Logano had to two unscheduled stops due to flat tires. Brad Keselowski slammed the wall, causing the second stage to end under caution with Kyle Busch as the winner. Daniel Hemric spun and collected Michael McDowell, Jimmie Johnson, and Denny Hamlin. Kyle Busch slammed the wall after having a flat tire as Erik Jones held off Kyle Larson for his second career win. With his third-place finish, Kyle Busch clinched the Regular Season Championship.

Round 26: Big Machine Vodka 400 at The Brickyard

Kevin Harvick started on pole for the regular season finale. Landon Cassill slammed the wall hard. Erik Jones and Brad Keselowski made contact, sending Keselowski hard into the tire barrier as Joey Logano won the first stage. Kyle Busch had a tire go down and had to pit, but the engine blew up and the car caught fire. Harvick won the second stage under caution. Kurt Busch slammed the wall along Paul Menard, Parker Kligerman and Jimmie Johnson, who was unable to continue thus making the first time Johnson did not make the Playoffs. Kyle Larson hit the wall as well as Alex Bowman. Harvick dominated and held off Logano for his third win of the season and his second Brickyard 400. Clint Bowyer and Ryan Newman clinched the final two Playoff spots.

Round 27: South Point 400

Clint Bowyer started on pole. Kyle Busch got into the wall and had to pit, going two Laps down to fix the damage. Joey Logano dominated and won the first stage while Martin Truex Jr. won the second stage. William Byron spun while Logano made contact with Daniel Suárez and Chase Elliott, causing him and Elliott to pit. Kurt Busch slammed the wall after having a flat tire. Truex took the lead from Kevin Harvick to get his fifth win of the season and punching his ticket to the next round of the Playoffs.

Round 28: Federated Auto Parts 400

Brad Keselowski started on pole. Martin Truex Jr. won the first stage. Alex Bowman spun after contact with Austin Dillon and Reed Sorenson slammed the wall. Kyle Busch won the second stage and dominated. Truex spun while leading after making contact with Ricky Stenhouse Jr. Truex was able to take the lead from Kyle Busch and pull away to sweep the season at Richmond and get his sixth win of the season and going back-to-back for the first time in his career. Kyle Busch and Kevin Harvick clenched spots in the next round of the Playoffs. After the race, Jones' car failed post-race inspection, regulating him to a last place finish, making it the first time that a driver was disqualified in the MENCS under the new inspection rule.

Round 29: Bank of America Roval 400

William Byron started on pole. Jimmie Johnson spun and collected Erik Jones, sending him to the garage. Kyle Larson won the first stage while Chase Elliott won the second stage. Elliott slid head-on into the wall on the restart. Ryan Newman spun into the wall along with Denny Hamlin as Daniel Suárez slammed the wall and spun. Chase Elliott was able to drive from the back to take the lead from Kevin Harvick and hold off teammate Alex Bowman for his third win of the season. Kurt Busch, Newman, Aric Almirola, and Jones were eliminated from the Playoffs.

Round 30: Drydene 400

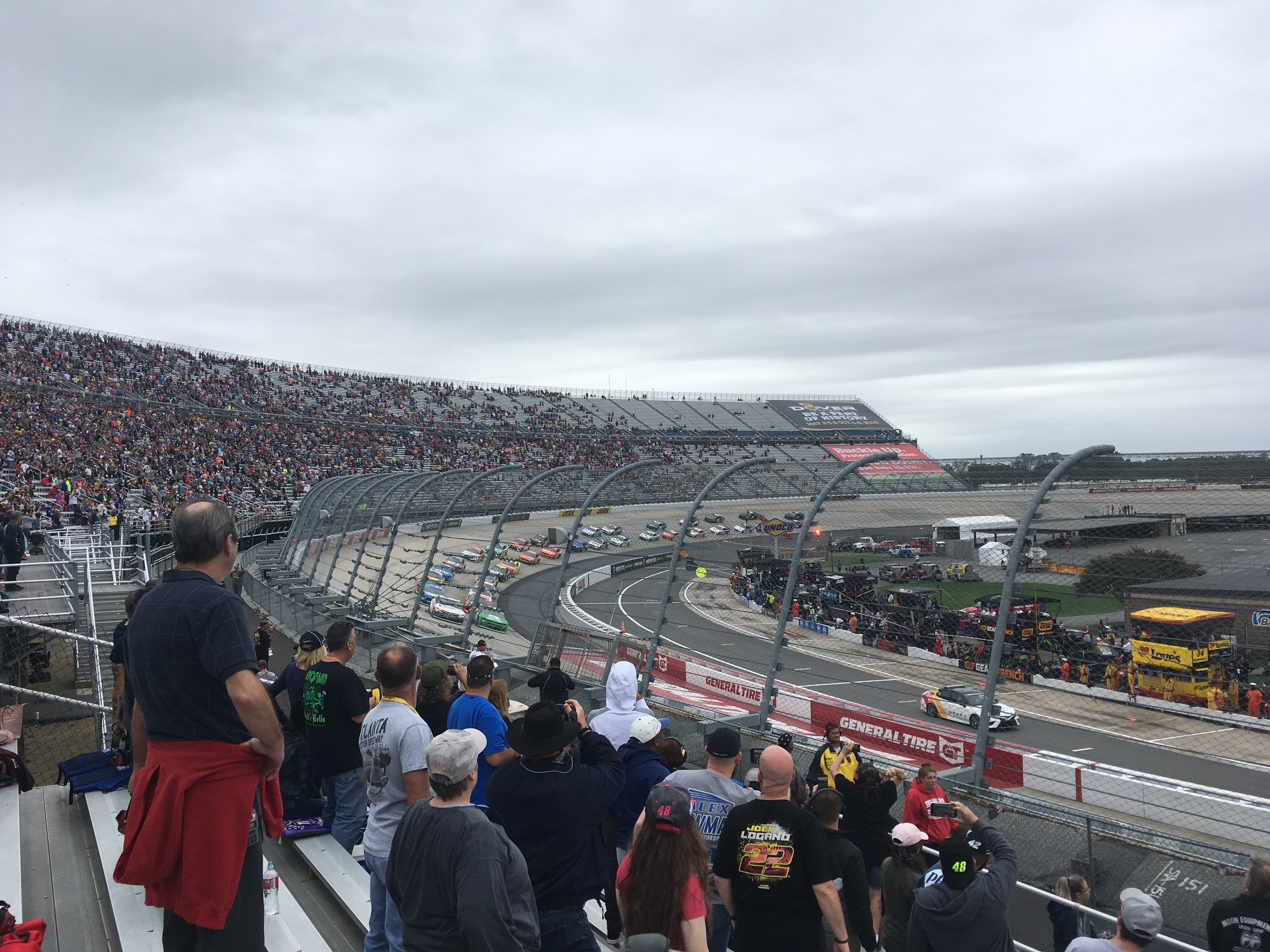
Denny Hamlin leads the field to the green flag at the Drydene 400 at Dover International Speedway in October

Denny Hamlin won the pole with a new track record. Joey Logano had to go to the garage before the race to change a broken drive shaft. Chase Elliott was taken out after blowing an engine. Hamlin dominated and won the first stage while Martin Truex Jr. won the second stage. Ryan Blaney was taken out after brake issues. Kyle Larson took the lead from the dominant Hamlin and held off Truex Jr. for his first win since 2017 and advancing to the next round of the Playoffs.

Round 31: 1000Bulbs.com 500

Chase Elliott started on the pole. The race started on Sunday with William Byron winning Stage 1. At this point, it started raining, with the rain postponing the remainder of the race until Monday. Stage 2 started on Monday with Ryan Blaney leading the field to green. With three laps to go in the stage Joey Logano bumped Alex Bowman from the lead collecting Kyle Larson, Jimmie Johnson, and others. Clint Bowyer won Stage 2 under caution. The second big one happened when Kurt Busch got into Byron. collecting Logano and others. Bowyer spun into the banking of turn 3, leaving him stuck. The third big one happened with 7 laps to go caused by Kyle Busch collecting Brad Keselowski, Kevin Harvick and several others. Brendan Gaughan took the worst hit as his car ended up flipping midair once before landing back on its wheels. Blaney led the field back to green with three laps to go on the last lap Ryan Newman was leading when Blaney made the winning move bumping into Newman, causing a photo finish. On the replay it showed Blaney beating Newman by .007 seconds locking Blaney into the round of 8. This finish marked the 6th closest finish in NASCAR history.

Round 32: Hollywood Casino 400

Daniel Hemric started the race on pole. Joey Logano won the first stage while Denny Hamlin won the second stage. Hamlin dominated and led the most laps in the race. Late in the race, Bubba Wallace and Matt Tifft wrecked to set up an overtime finish. During the first overtime, Hemric and Daniel Suárez crashed right before the white flag came out, setting up a second overtime finish. During the second overtime, Hamlin held off Chase Elliott and Kyle Busch to win the race, his fifth win of the season. Following the race, Brad Keselowski, Alex Bowman, Clint Bowyer, and William Byron were eliminated from the playoffs.

Round 33: First Data 500

Denny Hamlin started on pole. Martin Truex Jr. dominated and won both stages. Chase Elliott was forced to the garage with a broken axle and returned to the race several laps down. Ty Dillon spun while Austin Dillon and Clint Bowyer both had flat tires. Kyle Busch and Aric Almirola made contact and both spun collecting Ryan Preece and Jimmie Johnson. Hamlin and Joey Logano made contact, putting Logano in the wall and spinning with a flat tire. Truex held off William Byron for his seventh win of the season and capturing a Championship 4 spot in Miami.

Round 34: AAA Texas 500

Kevin Harvick started on pole. Chase Elliott slammed the wall and went several laps down. Brad Keselowski got into the wall and was slammed into by Ricky Stenhouse Jr. Corey LaJoie got into the wall twice as Kevin Harvick beat out teammate Clint Bowyer for the first stage win. Aric Almirola dominated and won the second stage. Jimmie Johnson led several laps until he got into the wall. Harvick got a pit road penalty and went a lap down. Harvick eventually got back on the lead lap and took the lead from Almirola and drove to his fourth win of the season and capturing a Championship 4 spot in Miami.

Round 35: Bluegreen Vacations 500

Kyle Busch started on pole. Ricky Stenhouse Jr. had a tire go down and brought out the caution. Denny Hamlin won the first stage while Joey Logano won the second stage. Chase Elliott had a flat tire and slammed the wall, ending his championship run. John Hunter Nemechek had a flat tire that brought out the caution. Hamlin held off Kyle Busch for his sixth win of the season and joining Kevin Harvick and Martin Truex Jr. in the Championship 4. Kyle Busch clinched the final spot over Logano on points while Elliott, Ryan Blaney, Logano, and Kyle Larson were eliminated from the Playoffs.

Round 36: Ford EcoBoost 400

Denny Hamlin started on pole after qualifying was cancelled due to rain. Martin Truex Jr. won the first stage while Kyle Busch won the second stage. Truex went a lap down after a pit road miscalculation with the tires as one tire was put on the wrong side of the car. John Hunter Nemechek had a tire go down and spun. Hamlin went a lap down after trouble on pit road with overheating due to too much tape put on the grille. Kyle Busch held off Truex for his fifth win of the season and winning his second Monster Energy NASCAR Cup Series Championship.

== Results and standings ==
=== Race results ===
No.	Race	Pole position	Most laps led	Winning driver	Manufacturer	Report
	Advance Auto Parts Clash	Paul Menard	Paul Menard	Jimmie Johnson	Chevrolet	Report
	Gander RV Duel 1	William Byron	Kevin Harvick	Kevin Harvick	Ford	Report
	Gander RV Duel 2	Alex Bowman	Clint Bowyer	Joey Logano	Ford	Report
1	Daytona 500	William Byron	Matt DiBenedetto	Denny Hamlin	Toyota	Report
2	Folds of Honor QuikTrip 500	Aric Almirola	Kyle Larson	Brad Keselowski	Ford	Report
3	Pennzoil 400	Kevin Harvick	Kevin Harvick	Joey Logano	Ford	Report
4	TicketGuardian 500	Ryan Blaney	Kyle Busch	Kyle Busch	Toyota	Report
5	Auto Club 400	Austin Dillon	Kyle Busch	Kyle Busch	Toyota	Report
6	STP 500	Joey Logano	Brad Keselowski	Brad Keselowski	Ford	Report
7	O'Reilly Auto Parts 500	Jimmie Johnson	Kyle Busch	Denny Hamlin	Toyota	Report
8	Food City 500	Chase Elliott	Ryan Blaney	Kyle Busch	Toyota	Report
9	Toyota Owners 400	Kevin Harvick	Martin Truex Jr.	Martin Truex Jr.	Toyota	Report
10	GEICO 500	Austin Dillon	Chase Elliott	Chase Elliott	Chevrolet	Report
11	Gander RV 400	Chase Elliott	Chase Elliott	Martin Truex Jr.	Toyota	Report
12	Digital Ally 400	Kevin Harvick	Kevin Harvick	Brad Keselowski	Ford	Report
	Monster Energy Open	Daniel Hemric	Daniel Hemric	Kyle Larson	Chevrolet	Report
	Monster Energy NASCAR All-Star Race	Clint Bowyer	Kevin Harvick	Kyle Larson	Chevrolet	Report
13	Coca-Cola 600	William Byron	Martin Truex Jr.	Martin Truex Jr.	Toyota	Report
14	Pocono 400	William Byron	Kyle Busch	Kyle Busch	Toyota	Report
15	FireKeepers Casino 400	Joey Logano	Joey Logano	Joey Logano	Ford	Report
16	Toyota/Save Mart 350	Kyle Larson	Martin Truex Jr.	Martin Truex Jr.	Toyota	Report
17	Camping World 400	Austin Dillon	Kevin Harvick	Alex Bowman	Chevrolet	Report
18	Coke Zero Sugar 400	Joey Logano	Austin Dillon	Justin Haley	Chevrolet	Report
19	Quaker State 400	Daniel Suárez	Kyle Busch	Kurt Busch	Chevrolet	Report
20	Foxwoods Resort Casino 301	Brad Keselowski	Kyle Busch	Kevin Harvick	Ford	Report
21	Gander RV 400	Kevin Harvick	Kevin Harvick	Denny Hamlin	Toyota	Report
22	Go Bowling at The Glen	Chase Elliott	Chase Elliott	Chase Elliott	Chevrolet	Report
23	Consumers Energy 400	Brad Keselowski	Brad Keselowski	Kevin Harvick	Ford	Report
24	Bass Pro Shops NRA Night Race	Denny Hamlin	Matt DiBenedetto	Denny Hamlin	Toyota	Report
25	Bojangles' Southern 500	William Byron	Kyle Busch	Erik Jones	Toyota	Report
26	Big Machine Vodka 400 at the Brickyard	Kevin Harvick	Kevin Harvick	Kevin Harvick	Ford	Report
Monster Energy NASCAR Cup Series Playoffs
Round of 16
27	South Point 400	Clint Bowyer	Joey Logano	Martin Truex Jr.	Toyota	Report
28	Federated Auto Parts 400	Brad Keselowski	Kyle Busch	Martin Truex Jr.	Toyota	Report
29	Bank of America Roval 400	William Byron	Chase Elliott	Chase Elliott	Chevrolet	Report
Round of 12
30	Drydene 400	Denny Hamlin	Denny Hamlin	Kyle Larson	Chevrolet	Report
31	1000Bulbs.com 500	Chase Elliott	Ryan Blaney	Ryan Blaney	Ford	Report
32	Hollywood Casino 400	Daniel Hemric	Denny Hamlin	Denny Hamlin	Toyota	Report
Round of 8
33	First Data 500	Denny Hamlin	Martin Truex Jr.	Martin Truex Jr.	Toyota	Report
34	AAA Texas 500	Kevin Harvick	Kevin Harvick	Kevin Harvick	Ford	Report
35	Bluegreen Vacations 500	Kyle Busch	Denny Hamlin	Denny Hamlin	Toyota	Report
Championship 4
36	Ford EcoBoost 400	Denny Hamlin	Kyle Busch	Kyle Busch	Toyota	Report

=== Drivers' Championship ===
(key) Bold – Pole position awarded by time. Italics – Pole position set by final practice results or owner's points. * – Most laps led. ^{1} – Stage 1 winner. ^{2} – Stage 2 winner. ^{3} – Stage 3 winner. (Note: Stage 3 Winner only for Coca-Cola 600.) ^{1–10} - Regular season top 10 finishers.

. – Eliminated after Round of 16 . – Eliminated after Round of 12 . – Eliminated after Round of 8

Pos.	Driver	DAY	ATL	LVS	PHO	CAL	MAR	TEX	BRI	RCH	TAL	DOV	KAN	CLT	POC	MCH	SON	CHI	DAY	KEN	NHA	POC	GLN	MCH	BRI	DAR	IND	LVS	RCH	ROV	DOV	TAL	KAN	MAR	TEX	PHO	HOM	Pts.	Stage	Bonus
1	Kyle Busch	2^{1}	6	3	1*^{2}	1*^{12}	3	10*	1	8^{1}	10	10	30	3	1*	5	2	22	14	2*^{2}	8*^{1}	9^{1}	11	6^{2}	4	3*^{2}	37	19	2*^{2}	37	6	19	3	14	7	**2**	1*^{2}	5040	–	46^{1}
2	Martin Truex Jr.	35	2	8	2	8	8	12	17	1*	20	1^{2}	19	1*^{3}	35	3	1*	9	22	19	6	3	2	4^{1}	13	15	27	1^{2}	1^{1}	7	2^{2}	26	6	1*^{12}	6	6	2^{1}	5035	–	42^{5}
3	Kevin Harvick	26	4^{2}	**4***^{1}	9	4	6	8	13	**4**	38	4	**13***^{1}	10	22	7	6	14*^{2}	29	22	1	**6***	7	1	39	4	**1***^{2}	2	7	3	4	17	9	7	**1***^{1}	5	4	5033	–	28^{3}
4	Denny Hamlin	1	11	10	5	7	5	1^{2}	5	5	36	21	16	17	6	11	5^{2}	15^{1}	26	5	2	1	3	2	**1**	29	6	15	3	19	**5***^{1}	3	1*^{2}	**4**	28	1*^{1}	10	5027	–	37^{4}
Monster Energy NASCAR Cup Series Playoffs cut-off
Pos.	Driver	DAY	ATL	LVS	PHO	CAL	MAR	TEX	BRI	RCH	TAL	DOV	KAN	CLT	POC	MCH	SON	CHI	DAY	KEN	NHA	POC	GLN	MCH	BRI	DAR	IND	LVS	RCH	ROV	DOV	TAL	KAN	MAR	TEX	PHO	HOM	Pts.	Stage	Bonus
5	Joey Logano	4	23	1^{2}	10	2	**19**	17^{1}	3^{2}	2^{2}	4	7^{1}	15	2	7	**1***^{1}	23	3	25^{1}	7	9	13	23	17	16	14	2^{1}	9*^{1}	11	10	34	11	17^{1}	8	4	9^{2}	5	2380	40	30^{2}
6	Kyle Larson	7	12*^{1}	12	6	12	18	39	19	37	24	3	8	33	26^{12}	14	**10**	2	20	4	33	5	8	3	6^{1}	2	33	8	6	13^{1}	1	39	14	9	12	4	40	2339	50	11^{10}
7	Ryan Blaney	31^{2}	22	22	**3**^{1}	5	4	37	4*	25	15	15	32	13	12	9	3	6	36	13	4	10	5	24	10	13	7	5	17	8	35	1*	21	5	8	3	11	2339	38	9^{9}
8	Brad Keselowski	12	1	2	19	3	1*^{12}	36	18	7	13	12	1	19^{12}	2	6	18	5	39	20	**10**	8	9	**19***	3	5	38	3	**4**	5	11	25	19	3	39	10	18	2318	29	24^{6}
9	Clint Bowyer	20	5	14	11	38	7	2	7	3	29	9	5	24	5	35	11	37	34	6	20	11	20	37	7	6	5	**25**	8	4	10	23^{2}	8	35	11	8	6	2290	34	1
10	Chase Elliott	17	19	9	14	11	2	13	**11**	15	1*^{2}	**5***	4^{2}	4	4	20	37	11	35	15	29	38	**1***^{12}	9	5	19	9	4	13	1*^{2}	38	**8**	2	36	32	39	15	2275	20	24^{7}
11	William Byron	**21**	17	16	24	15	22	6	16	13	21	8	20	**9**	**9**	18	19^{1}	8	2	18	12	4	21	8	21	**21**	4	7	24	**6**	13	33^{1}	5	2	17	17	39	2274	44	2
12	Alex Bowman	11	15	11	35	21	14	18	23	17	2	2	2	7	15	10	14	1	21	17	14	20	14	10	15	18	21	6	23	2	3	37	11	30	5	23	9	2257	29	5
13	Kurt Busch	25	3	5	7	6	12	9	2	11	6	13	7	27	11	2	13	13	10	1^{1}	18	27	10	23	9^{2}	7^{1}	30	39	18	20	9	28	4	6	9	11	21	2237	18	11^{8}
14	Aric Almirola	32	**8**	7	4	9	9	7	37	23	9	16	12	11	10	17	9	16	7	14	11^{2}	12	12	33	29	17	14	13	16	14	17	4	23	37	2^{2}	22	22	2234	32	1
15	Ryan Newman	14	13	24	12	22	23	11	9	9	7	18	23	16	16	8	7	17	5	9	7	14	25	12	11	23	8	10	5	32	22	2	40	10	15	18	7	2219	6	–
16	Erik Jones	3	7	13	29	19	30	4	24	14	19	6	3	40	3	31	8	7	23	3	3	2	4	18	22	1	39	36	38	40	15	34	7	20	10	7	3	2194	22	5
17	Daniel Suárez	33	10	17	23	13	10	3	8	18	12	11	14	18	8	4	17	24	40	**8**	19	24	17	5	8	11	11	20	9	34	14	32	32	31	3	15	14	846	100	–
18	Jimmie Johnson	9	24	19	8	17	24	**5**	10	12	33	14	6	8	19	15	12	4	3	30	30	15^{2}	19	34	19	16	35	11	10	9	8	38	10	38	34	14	13	835	121	1
19	Paul Menard	29	14	15	17	20	15	19	6	10	16	17	24	14	18	13	22	21	16	11	13	18	18	15	23	9	10	14	27	16	12	16^{‡}	18	21	20	12	17	777	33	–
20	Chris Buescher	37	9	18	16	16	21	20	22	22	30	23	10	6	14	16	16	18	17	10	15	16	13	14	17	12	15	18	31	18	36	20	13	12	19	16	16	729	34	–
21	Austin Dillon	16	21	20	21	**10**	11	14	14	6	**14**	19	17	34	37	26^{2}	24	**10**	33*^{2}	35	32	19	31	13	34	10	12	12	22	23	18	6	20	22	13	24	8	700	86	2
22	Matt DiBenedetto	28*	26	21	28	18	20	26	12	24	31	20	36	39	17	21	4	27	8	16	5	17	6	20	2*	8	18	21	14	11	7	30	15	16	14	13	20	699	16	–
23	Ricky Stenhouse Jr.	13	18	6	13	14	25	16	33	16	25	33	11	5	32	19	21	12	24	12	36	21	15	28	33	33	31	26	15	17	16	9	16	15	40	19	19	679	72	–
24	Ty Dillon	6	25	29	15	27	13	21	15^{1}	21	17^{1}	22	28	23	27	22	27	35	4	26	16	29	30	11	20	20	13	16	26	15	23	10	22	24	18	20	24	613	20	2
25	Daniel Hemric **(R)**	34	20	23	18	35	27	33	30	19	5	25	18	21	13	12	15	19	18	24	37	7	35	26	12	37	34	17	25	33	21	21	**31**	17	16	21	12	530	15	–
26	Ryan Preece **(R)**	8	35	25	34	23	16	22	25	20	3	28	25	31	23	25	29	28	32	21	21	37	36	7	18	22	16	27	30	21	19	18	12	19	23	26	25	507	3	–
27	Michael McDowell	5	37	30	36	24	31	15	28	36	40	24	26	22	20	27	25	20	13	25	17	25	16	22	37	38	17	24	21	12	24	5	24	23	25	30	26	485	15	–
28	Bubba Wallace	38	27	26	22	30	17	23	20	27	39	27	29	25	21	28	26	25	15	23	22	22	28	27	14	24	3	23	12	24	20	24	35	13	24	25	34	437	7	–
29	Corey LaJoie	18	29	27	26	31	33	28	34	26	11	29	22	12	36	23	32	30	6	28	23	26	34	21	24	36	19	28	29	27	28	7	28	18	38	35	31	401	–	–
30	David Ragan	30	16	28	25	25	26	25	21	28	23	26	27	15	30	34	20	23	38	29	34	36	22	16	36	26	20	22	19	35	27	29	26	11	35	36	27	388	–	–
31	Matt Tifft **(R)**	36	28	34	20	26	29	24	27	29	37	32	21	20	33	24	28	29	9	27	24	23	24	25	27	27	32	30	20	25	25	13	25	Wth				352	–	–
32	Reed Sorenson			36		34		34	Wth		18	35	35	30	28		35	34			27	32	37	QL	38	30	23	37	37	39	37	22	33	33		37	37	118	–	–
33	Quin Houff				30				32	34		36	34	28	29	32		38	37	34	31	31		31	30				35						33			77	–	–
34	Jamie McMurray	22																																				19	–	–
35	Austin Theriault																				35	34		32					32			35						17	–	–
36	Andy Seuss																				28																	9	–	–
37	Drew Herring																																				29	8	–	–
38	Blake Jones																															31						6	–	–
39	Stanton Barrett										35																											2	–	–
40	Casey Mears	40																																				1	–	–
Ineligible for driver points
Pos.	Driver	DAY	ATL	LVS	PHO	CAL	MAR	TEX	BRI	RCH	TAL	DOV	KAN	CLT	POC	MCH	SON	CHI	DAY	KEN	NHA	POC	GLN	MCH	BRI	DAR	IND	LVS	RCH	ROV	DOV	TAL	KAN	MAR	TEX	PHO	HOM	Pts.	Stage	Bonus
	Justin Haley										32						34		1																					
	Brendan Gaughan	23									8								19													27								
	Tyler Reddick	27									QL		9																											
	Ross Chastain	10	31	33	27	28	34	29	29	30	26	30	31	36	24		33	26	30	31	25	30	27	29	26	28	22	31	36	22	31	12	27	29	31	28	35			
	Landon Cassill	24	34	32	33	29	28	30	26	35	34	31	37	37	31	29	31	31	11	32	26	28	29	30	25	25	40	29	28	28	26	14	37	26	27	33	28			
	J. J. Yeley														34		38		12						28	32	26	32	33	29	32		30	28	26	29	30			
	Parker Kligerman	15	30	31				27			27			26			30		31				26				36			26		15	29		22					
	B. J. McLeod	19	32	37		37		31				37		29				36	28	36		33			32	39	25	33			29			27			32			
	John Hunter Nemechek																																		21	27	23			
	Jeffrey Earnhardt										22																													
	Ryan Sieg																										24													
	Bayley Currey				31			35	31	32			33	35	25			32		33																32				
	Matt Crafton																																	25						
	Joey Gase	DNQ		38		35				33			38	32					27							34		38				36	38			38				
	Garrett Smithley		36			36		32								30								35		35	28	35		36	33		34	32	36	31				
	Cody Ware	39	33	35	32	32	36				28	34	40	38			36						33	36						QL										
	Joe Nemechek																									31		34		31	30				29	34	38			
	Josh Bilicki															33		33				35	32		35		29			38			36		30		36			
	Timmy Hill							38	35				39																	30			39	34	37		33			
	Jeb Burton						35			31																														
	Kyle Weatherman															36	QL								31															
	D. J. Kennington						32																																	
	Spencer Boyd																							38					34			40								
	Gray Gaulding								36																															
	Ryan Truex	DNQ																																						
Pos.	Driver	DAY	ATL	LVS	PHO	CAL	MAR	TEX	BRI	RCH	TAL	DOV	KAN	CLT	POC	MCH	SON	CHI	DAY	KEN	NHA	POC	GLN	MCH	BRI	DAR	IND	LVS	RCH	ROV	DOV	TAL	KAN	MAR	TEX	PHO	HOM	Pts.	Stage	Bonus
^{‡} – After suffering from neck pain, Paul Menard did not complete the race and shortly before Sunday's red flag, he was replaced by Matt Crafton. Since Menard started the race, he is officially credited with the 16th-place finish.

=== Manufacturers' championship ===
Pos	Manufacturer	Wins	Points
1	Toyota	19	1318
2	Ford	10	1268
3	Chevrolet	7	1222

== See also ==
- 2019 NASCAR Xfinity Series
- 2019 NASCAR Gander Outdoors Truck Series
- 2019 ARCA Menards Series
- 2019 NASCAR K&N Pro Series East
- 2019 NASCAR K&N Pro Series West
- 2019 NASCAR Whelen Modified Tour
- 2019 NASCAR PEAK Mexico Series
- 2019 NASCAR Whelen Euro Series
- 2019 NASCAR Pinty's Series
