= 2019 Monster Energy NASCAR All-Star Race =

35th NASCAR All-Star Race

Race details
- Date: May 18, 2019
- Location: Charlotte Motor Speedway in Concord, North Carolina
- Course: Permanent racing facility 1.5 mi (2.4 km)
- Distance: Open: 62 laps, 93 mi (150 km); All-Star Race: 88 laps, 132 mi (212 km)
- Avg Speed: Open: 91.877 mph (147.862 km/h); All-Star Race: 77.439 mph (124.626 km/h)

Monster Energy Open
- Pole: Daniel Hemric (Richard Childress Racing)
- Time: 29.643
- Winner (segment 1): William Byron (Hendrick Motorsports)
- Winner (segment 2): Bubba Wallace (Richard Petty Motorsports)
- Winner (segment 3): Kyle Larson (Chip Ganassi Racing)
- Fan Vote winners: Alex Bowman (Hendrick Motorsports)

Monster Energy NASCAR All-Star Race
- Pole: Clint Bowyer (Stewart-Haas Racing)
- Time: 118.794
- Most laps led: Kevin Harvick (Stewart-Haas Racing)
- Laps led: 33
- Winner: Kyle Larson (Chip Ganassi Racing)

Television
- Network: FS1
- Announcers: Mike Joy, Jeff Gordon and Darrell Waltrip
- Nielsen ratings: 1.206 million (Open); 2.441 million (All Star)

Radio
- Network: Motor Racing Network
- Announcers: Alex Hayden, Jeff Striegle and Rusty Wallace (Booth); Dave Moody (1 & 2); Kyle Rickey (3 & 4) (Turns)

The 2019 Monster Energy NASCAR All-Star Race (XXXV) was a Monster Energy NASCAR Cup Series stock car exhibition race held on May 18, 2019 at Charlotte Motor Speedway in Concord, North Carolina. Contested over 88 laps—extended from 85 laps due to an overtime finish, it was the second exhibition race of the 2019 Monster Energy NASCAR Cup Series season.

== Report ==
=== Background ===
Charlotte Motor Speedway, the track where the race was held.

The All-Star Race was open to race winners from last season through the 2019 Digital Ally 400 at Kansas Speedway and all previous All-Star race winners and Monster Race NASCAR Cup champions who had attempted to qualify for every race in 2019 were eligible to compete in the All-Star Race.

==== Entry list ====
===== Monster Energy Open =====
No.	Driver	Team	Manufacturer
00	Landon Cassill (i)	StarCom Racing	Chevrolet
8	Daniel Hemric (R)	Richard Childress Racing	Chevrolet
13	Ty Dillon	Germain Racing	Chevrolet
15	Ross Chastain (i)	Premium Motorsports	Chevrolet
17	Ricky Stenhouse Jr.	Roush Fenway Racing	Ford
21	Paul Menard	Wood Brothers Racing	Ford
24	William Byron	Hendrick Motorsports	Chevrolet
32	Corey LaJoie	Go Fas Racing	Ford
34	Michael McDowell	Front Row Motorsports	Ford
36	Matt Tifft (R)	Front Row Motorsports	Ford
37	Chris Buescher	JTG Daugherty Racing	Chevrolet
38	David Ragan	Front Row Motorsports	Ford
41	Daniel Suárez	Stewart-Haas Racing	Ford
42	Kyle Larson	Chip Ganassi Racing	Chevrolet
43	Bubba Wallace	Richard Petty Motorsports	Chevrolet
46	Joey Gase (i)	MBM Motorsports	Toyota
47	Ryan Preece (R)	JTG Daugherty Racing	Chevrolet
51	Cody Ware (i)	Petty Ware Racing	Chevrolet
52	Bayley Currey (i)	Rick Ware Racing	Ford
53	B. J. McLeod (i)	Rick Ware Racing	Chevrolet
66	Timmy Hill (i)	MBM Motorsports	Toyota
77	Quin Houff	Spire Motorsports	Chevrolet
88	Alex Bowman	Hendrick Motorsports	Chevrolet
95	Matt DiBenedetto	Leavine Family Racing	Toyota
Official entry list

===== Monster Energy NASCAR All-Star Race =====
No.	Driver	Team	Manufacturer
1	Kurt Busch	Chip Ganassi Racing	Chevrolet
2	Brad Keselowski	Team Penske	Ford
3	Austin Dillon	Richard Childress Racing	Chevrolet
4	Kevin Harvick	Stewart-Haas Racing	Ford
6	Ryan Newman	Roush Fenway Racing	Ford
9	Chase Elliott	Hendrick Motorsports	Chevrolet
10	Aric Almirola	Stewart-Haas Racing	Ford
11	Denny Hamlin	Joe Gibbs Racing	Toyota
12	Ryan Blaney	Team Penske	Ford
14	Clint Bowyer	Stewart-Haas Racing	Ford
18	Kyle Busch	Joe Gibbs Racing	Toyota
19	Martin Truex Jr.	Joe Gibbs Racing	Toyota
20	Erik Jones	Joe Gibbs Racing	Toyota
22	Joey Logano	Team Penske	Ford
48	Jimmie Johnson	Hendrick Motorsports	Chevrolet
Official entry list

== Practice ==
=== Monster Energy Open/All-Star first practice ===
Aric Almirola was the fastest in the Open/All-Star first practice session with a time of 29.775 seconds and a speed of 181.360 mph (291.871 km/h).

Pos	No.	Driver	Team	Manufacturer	Time	Speed
1	10	Aric Almirola	Stewart-Haas Racing	Ford	29.775	181.360
2	4	Kevin Harvick	Stewart-Haas Racing	Ford	30.070	179.581
3	14	Clint Bowyer	Stewart-Haas Racing	Ford	30.182	178.915
Official Monster Energy Open/All-Star first practice results

=== Monster Energy Open final practice ===
Daniel Hemric was the fastest in the Monster Energy Open final practice session with a time of 29.961 seconds and a speed of 180.234 mph (290.059 km/h).

Pos	No.	Driver	Team	Manufacturer	Time	Speed
1	8	Daniel Hemric (R)	Richard Childress Racing	Chevrolet	29.961	180.234
2	34	Michael McDowell	Front Row Motorsports	Ford	30.077	179.539
3	36	Matt Tifft (R)	Front Row Motorsports	Ford	30.168	178.998
Official Monster Energy Open final practice results

=== Monster Energy NASCAR All-Star Race final practice ===
Austin Dillon was the fastest in the Monster Energy NASCAR All-Star Race final practice session with a time of 30.092 seconds and a speed of 179.450 mph (288.797 km/h).

Pos	No.	Driver	Team	Manufacturer	Time	Speed
1	3	Austin Dillon	Richard Childress Racing	Chevrolet	30.092	179.450
2	12	Ryan Blaney	Team Penske	Ford	30.242	178.560
3	14	Clint Bowyer	Stewart-Haas Racing	Ford	30.280	178.336
Official Monster Energy NASCAR All-Star Race final practice results

== Qualifying (Open) ==
Daniel Hemric scored the pole for the race with a time of 29.643 and a speed of 182.168 mph (293.171 km/h).

=== Open qualifying results ===
Pos	No.	Driver	Team	Manufacturer	R1	R2
1	8	Daniel Hemric (R)	Richard Childress Racing	Chevrolet	29.693	29.643
2	34	Michael McDowell	Front Row Motorsports	Ford	29.847	29.797
3	24	William Byron	Hendrick Motorsports	Chevrolet	29.820	29.819
4	41	Daniel Suárez	Stewart-Haas Racing	Ford	29.941	29.827
5	21	Paul Menard	Wood Brothers Racing	Ford	29.940	29.890
6	88	Alex Bowman	Hendrick Motorsports	Chevrolet	29.951	29.918
7	42	Kyle Larson	Chip Ganassi Racing	Chevrolet	29.965	29.918
8	37	Chris Buescher	JTG Daugherty Racing	Chevrolet	29.963	30.132
9	38	David Ragan	Front Row Motorsports	Ford	30.046	—
10	43	Bubba Wallace	Richard Petty Motorsports	Chevrolet	30.073	—
11	47	Ryan Preece (R)	JTG Daugherty Racing	Chevrolet	30.105	—
12	95	Matt DiBenedetto	Leavine Family Racing	Toyota	30.106	—
13	36	Matt Tifft (R)	Front Row Motorsports	Ford	30.136	—
14	13	Ty Dillon	Germain Racing	Chevrolet	30.152	—
15	17	Ricky Stenhouse Jr.	Roush Fenway Racing	Ford	30.162	—
16	32	Corey LaJoie	Go Fas Racing	Ford	30.317	—
17	00	Landon Cassill (i)	StarCom Racing	Chevrolet	30.508	—
18	15	Ross Chastain (i)	Premium Motorsports	Chevrolet	30.688	—
19	53	B. J. McLeod (i)	Rick Ware Racing	Chevrolet	30.801	—
20	52	Bayley Currey (i)	Rick Ware Racing	Ford	31.097	—
21	51	Cody Ware (i)	Petty Ware Racing	Chevrolet	31.711	—
22	66	Timmy Hill (i)	MBM Motorsports	Toyota	32.019	—
23	77	Quin Houff	Spire Motorsports	Chevrolet	32.316	—
24	46	Joey Gase (i)	MBM Motorsports	Toyota	0.000	—
Official Open qualifying results

== Qualifying (All-Star Race) ==
Clint Bowyer scored the pole for the race with a time of 118.794 and a speed of 136.371 mph (219.468 km/h).

=== All-Star Race qualifying results ===
Pos	No.	Driver	Team	Manufacturer	Time
1	14	Clint Bowyer	Stewart-Haas Racing	Ford	118.794
2	18	Kyle Busch	Joe Gibbs Racing	Toyota	118.971
3	4	Kevin Harvick	Stewart-Haas Racing	Ford	119.058
4	3	Austin Dillon	Richard Childress Racing	Chevrolet	119.314
5	19	Martin Truex Jr.	Joe Gibbs Racing	Toyota	120.334
6	6	Ryan Newman	Roush Fenway Racing	Ford	120.383
7	20	Erik Jones	Joe Gibbs Racing	Toyota	120.405
8	48	Jimmie Johnson	Hendrick Motorsports	Chevrolet	120.660
9	12	Ryan Blaney	Team Penske	Ford	120.892
10	22	Joey Logano	Team Penske	Ford	121.584
11	9	Chase Elliott	Hendrick Motorsports	Chevrolet	121.978
12	11	Denny Hamlin	Joe Gibbs Racing	Toyota	122.125
13	10	Aric Almirola	Stewart-Haas Racing	Ford	123.814
14	2	Brad Keselowski	Team Penske	Ford	124.059
15	1	Kurt Busch	Chip Ganassi Racing	Chevrolet	128.176
Official All-Star qualifying results

== Monster Energy Open ==
=== Monster Energy Open results ===
Pos	Grid	No.	Driver	Team	Manufacturer	Laps
1	7	42	Kyle Larson	Chip Ganassi Racing	Chevrolet	62
2	14	13	Ty Dillon	Germain Racing	Chevrolet	62
3	6	88	Alex Bowman	Hendrick Motorsports	Chevrolet	62
4	12	95	Matt DiBenedetto	Leavine Family Racing	Toyota	62
5	15	17	Ricky Stenhouse Jr.	Roush Fenway Racing	Ford	62
6	11	47	Ryan Preece (R)	JTG Daugherty Racing	Chevrolet	62
7	5	21	Paul Menard	Wood Brothers Racing	Ford	62
8	9	38	David Ragan	Front Row Motorsports	Ford	62
9	16	32	Corey LaJoie	Go Fas Racing	Ford	62
10	2	34	Michael McDowell	Front Row Motorsports	Ford	62
11	13	36	Matt Tifft (R)	Front Row Motorsports	Ford	62
12	4	41	Daniel Suárez	Stewart-Haas Racing	Ford	62
13	17	00	Landon Cassill (i)	StarCom Racing	Chevrolet	62
14	20	52	Bayley Currey (i)	Rick Ware Racing	Ford	62
15	22	66	Timmy Hill (i)	MBM Motorsports	Toyota	62
16	23	77	Quin Houff	Spire Motorsports	Chevrolet	55
17	10	43	Bubba Wallace	Richard Petty Motorsports	Chevrolet	52 ^{a}
18	1	8	Daniel Hemric (R)	Richard Childress Racing	Chevrolet	46
19	21	51	Cody Ware (i)	Petty Ware Racing	Chevrolet	38
20	18	15	Ross Chastain (i)	Premium Motorsports	Chevrolet	35
21	3	24	William Byron	Hendrick Motorsports	Chevrolet	27 ^{b}
22	24	46	Joey Gase (i)	MBM Motorsports	Toyota	21
23	8	37	Chris Buescher	JTG Daugherty Racing	Chevrolet	16
24	19	53	B. J. McLeod (i)	Rick Ware Racing	Chevrolet	15
^a Winner of the second segment.^b Winner of the first segment.
Official Monster Energy Open race results

== All-Star Race ==
=== Race ===
The pole-sitter was Clint Bowyer, although the person who dominated the race was Kevin Harvick, who was seeking his third win in the All-Star Race. Kyle Larson took the lead in the #42 Chevrolet with 13 laps to go and held it to the end, winning his first All-Star Race victory.

=== Post-race Scuffle ===
On the final lap of the race, pole-sitter Clint Bowyer chopped into the front of Ryan Newman's #6 Acorns Ford Fusion, almost taking both cars out of the race. When the checkered flag waved and during the cool-down lap, Newman tapped Bowyer in the back, igniting a post-race scuffle that ended with Bowyer running up to Newman's car and punching him several times while Newman was strapped in his car. Both drivers were summoned to the NASCAR Hauler post-race, but no penalties were assessed to either driver.

=== All-Star Race results ===
Pos	Grid	No.	Driver	Team	Manufacturer	Laps
1	18	42	Kyle Larson	Chip Ganassi Racing	Chevrolet	88
2	3	4	Kevin Harvick	Stewart-Haas Racing	Ford	88
3	2	18	Kyle Busch	Joe Gibbs Racing	Toyota	88
4	10	22	Joey Logano	Team Penske	Ford	88
5	17	43	Bubba Wallace	Richard Petty Motorsports	Chevrolet	88
6	13	10	Aric Almirola	Stewart-Haas Racing	Ford	88
7	4	3	Austin Dillon	Richard Childress Racing	Chevrolet	88
8	19	88	Alex Bowman	Hendrick Motorsports	Chevrolet	88
9	16	24	William Byron	Hendrick Motorsports	Chevrolet	88
10	5	19	Martin Truex Jr.	Joe Gibbs Racing	Toyota	88
11	14	2	Brad Keselowski	Team Penske	Ford	88
12	1	14	Clint Bowyer	Stewart-Haas Racing	Ford	88
13	11	9	Chase Elliott	Hendrick Motorsports	Chevrolet	88
14	6	6	Ryan Newman	Roush Fenway Racing	Ford	88
15	8	48	Jimmie Johnson	Hendrick Motorsports	Chevrolet	88
16	9	12	Ryan Blaney	Team Penske	Ford	88
17	15	1	Kurt Busch	Chip Ganassi Racing	Chevrolet	83
18	12	11	Denny Hamlin	Joe Gibbs Racing	Toyota	79
19	7	20	Erik Jones	Joe Gibbs Racing	Toyota	77
Official Monster Energy NASCAR All-Star Race results

== Media ==
=== Television ===
Fox Sports was the television broadcaster of the race in the United States. Lap-by-lap announcer Mike Joy was accompanied on the broadcast by retired NASCAR drivers Jeff Gordon and Darrell Waltrip. This was Waltrip's final planned All Star race in the booth, as he retired from NASCAR broadcasting after the June 23rd Toyota/Save Mart 350 (although he was a guest during the 2020 broadcast). Jamie Little, Vince Welch, and Matt Yocum reported from pit lane.

FS1 Television
Booth announcers	Pit reporters
Lap-by-lap: Mike Joy; Color-commentator: Jeff Gordon; Color commentator: Darrell Waltrip	Jamie Little; Vince Welch; Matt Yocum

=== Radio ===
Motor Racing Network (MRN) continued their longstanding relationship with the track to broadcast the race on radio. The lead announcers for the race's broadcast were Alex Hayden, Jeff Striegle and Rusty Wallace. The network also implemented two announcers on each side of the track: Dave Moody in turns 1 and 2 and Kyle Rickey in turns 3 and 4. Winston Kelly, Kim Coon, Steve Post and Dillon Welch were the network's pit lane reporters. The network's broadcast was also simulcasted on Sirius XM NASCAR Radio.

MRN Radio
Booth announcers	Turn announcers	Pit reporters
Lead announcer: Alex Hayden; Announcer: Jeff Striegle; Announcer: Rusty Wallace	Turns 1 & 2: Dave Moody; Turns 3 & 4: Kyle Rickey	Winston Kelly; Kim Coon; Steve Post; Dillon Welch
