= 2019 Advance Auto Parts Clash =

Motor car race in Florida, U.S.

Race details
- Race 1 of 2 exhibition races in the 2019 Monster Energy NASCAR Cup Series
- Date: February 10, 2019
- Location: Daytona International Speedway in Daytona Beach, Florida
- Course: Permanent racing facility
- Course length: 2.5 miles (4.023 km)
- Distance: 59 laps, 147.5 mi (237.378 km)
- Scheduled distance: 75 laps, 187.5 mi (301.752 km)
- Average speed: 110.602 mph (177.997 km/h)

Pole position
Driver	Paul Menard	Wood Brothers Racing

Most laps led
Driver	Paul Menard	Wood Brothers Racing
- Laps: 51

Winner
No. 48	Jimmie Johnson	Hendrick Motorsports

Television in the United States
- Network: FS1
- Announcers: Mike Joy, Jeff Gordon, and Darrell Waltrip
- Nielsen ratings: 2.294 million

Radio in the United States
- Radio: MRN
- Booth announcers: Alex Hayden, Jeff Striegle, and Rusty Wallace
- Turn announcers: Dave Moody (1 & 2), Mike Bagley (Backstretch) and Kyle Rickey (3 & 4)

The 2019 Advance Auto Parts Clash was the 42nd edition of the Monster Energy NASCAR Cup Series race held on February 10, 2019, at Daytona International Speedway in Daytona Beach, Florida. The first exhibition race of the 2019 Monster Energy NASCAR Cup Series season, it was scheduled to be contested over 75 laps but was reduced to 59 laps due to rain.

14 years after his previous victory in the race, Jimmie Johnson won the Clash after moving into the race lead following contact with Paul Menard, which resulted in the majority of the field being involved in the subsequent crash.

== Report ==
=== Background ===
Daytona International Speedway, where the race is held.

The track, Daytona International Speedway, is one of six superspeedways to hold NASCAR races, the others being Michigan International Speedway, Auto Club Speedway, Indianapolis Motor Speedway, Pocono Raceway, and Talladega Superspeedway. The standard track at Daytona International Speedway is a four-turn superspeedway that measures 2.5 miles (4.0 kilometres) The track's turns are banked at 31 degrees, while the front stretch, the location of the finish line, is banked at 18 degrees.

=== Format and eligibility ===
The race was scheduled for 75 laps in length, and was divided into segments of 25 laps and 50 laps.

The 2019 Clash at Daytona was not a predetermined number of cars; rather, the field was limited to drivers who met more exclusive criteria. Only drivers who were 2018 Pole Award winners, former Clash race winners, former Daytona 500 champions, former Daytona 500 pole winners who competed full-time in 2018 and drivers who qualified for the 2018 NASCAR playoffs were eligible.

== Entry list ==
No.	Driver	Team	Manufacturer
1	Kurt Busch	Chip Ganassi Racing	Chevrolet
2	Brad Keselowski	Team Penske	Ford
3	Austin Dillon	Richard Childress Racing	Chevrolet
4	Kevin Harvick	Stewart-Haas Racing	Ford
6	Ryan Newman	Roush Fenway Racing	Ford
9	Chase Elliott	Hendrick Motorsports	Chevrolet
10	Aric Almirola	Stewart-Haas Racing	Ford
11	Denny Hamlin	Joe Gibbs Racing	Toyota
12	Ryan Blaney	Team Penske	Ford
14	Clint Bowyer	Stewart-Haas Racing	Ford
18	Kyle Busch	Joe Gibbs Racing	Toyota
19	Martin Truex Jr.	Joe Gibbs Racing	Toyota
20	Erik Jones	Joe Gibbs Racing	Toyota
21	Paul Menard	Wood Brothers Racing	Ford
22	Joey Logano	Team Penske	Ford
40	Jamie McMurray	Spire Motorsports	Chevrolet
41	Daniel Suárez	Stewart-Haas Racing	Ford
42	Kyle Larson	Chip Ganassi Racing	Chevrolet
48	Jimmie Johnson	Hendrick Motorsports	Chevrolet
88	Alex Bowman	Hendrick Motorsports	Chevrolet
Official entry list

== Practice ==
Joey Logano was the fastest in the final practice session with a time of 45.735 seconds and a speed of 196.786 mph (316.696 km/h).

Pos	No.	Driver	Team	Manufacturer	Time	Speed
1	22	Joey Logano	Team Penske	Ford	45.735	196.786
2	48	Jimmie Johnson	Hendrick Motorsports	Chevrolet	45.761	196.674
3	3	Austin Dillon	Richard Childress Racing	Chevrolet	45.773	196.622
Official final practice results

== Starting lineup ==
The lineup was determined by random draw, with Paul Menard drawing the top spot.

Pos	No	Driver	Team	Manufacturer
1	21	Paul Menard	Wood Brothers Racing	Ford
2	18	Kyle Busch	Joe Gibbs Racing	Toyota
3	2	Brad Keselowski	Team Penske	Ford
4	6	Ryan Newman	Roush Fenway Racing	Ford
5	88	Alex Bowman	Hendrick Motorsports	Chevrolet
6	4	Kevin Harvick	Stewart-Haas Racing	Ford
7	22	Joey Logano	Team Penske	Ford
8	12	Ryan Blaney	Team Penske	Ford
9	3	Austin Dillon	Richard Childress Racing	Chevrolet
10	41	Daniel Suárez	Stewart-Haas Racing	Ford
11	40	Jamie McMurray	Spire Motorsports	Chevrolet
12	19	Martin Truex Jr.	Joe Gibbs Racing	Toyota
13	48	Jimmie Johnson	Hendrick Motorsports	Chevrolet
14	42	Kyle Larson	Chip Ganassi Racing	Chevrolet
15	14	Clint Bowyer	Stewart-Haas Racing	Ford
16	9	Chase Elliott	Hendrick Motorsports	Chevrolet
17	11	Denny Hamlin	Joe Gibbs Racing	Toyota
18	10	Aric Almirola	Stewart-Haas Racing	Ford
19	1	Kurt Busch	Chip Ganassi Racing	Chevrolet
20	20	Erik Jones	Joe Gibbs Racing	Toyota
Official starting lineup

== Race ==
Prior to the start, Chase Elliott and Denny Hamlin, both of whom were involved in practice incidents, were sent to the rear for backup cars. Kyle Busch, who started from the front row, led the first lap before pole-sitter Paul Menard returned to the lead, with Team Penske's Brad Keselowski pushing Menard's Wood Brothers Racing car to the front – the duo working together as their teams formed part of a technical alliance. Menard maintained the lead, either side of a 21-minute red flag on lap 8 for rain, until lap 25 when the majority of the field pitted prior to the scheduled competition caution. Five drivers – Austin Dillon, Alex Bowman, Jamie McMurray, Kevin Harvick and Martin Truex Jr. – did not pit immediately and led the field at the caution, before pitting under the neutralized conditions.

Menard retook the lead for the restart on lap 33, but a second rain shower hit the track on lap 40, causing another red-flag stoppage of around 8 minutes. The race restarted on lap 48, but teams were warned of a longer rain cell that could end the race at any time, leading to a more aggressive race in the final laps, knowing that the race could end at any time. With the weather, the fairly single-file high side racing moved to two-lane racing. On lap 56, and following a well-timed push from Chip Ganassi Racing's Kurt Busch, Jimmie Johnson was able to pull up aside Menard heading towards turn 3; Menard attempted to block Johnson's "side draft" maneuver, but the two cars made contact. With the field bunched, a massive pileup ensued, with only 3 of the 20 starting cars not being involved in some form. While under caution, further heavier rain hit the track, causing a further red flag period which ultimately resulted in the race being called – Johnson was declared the winner ahead of Kurt Busch and Joey Logano.

=== Race results ===
Pos	Grid	No	Driver	Team	Manufacturer	Laps
1	13	48	Jimmie Johnson	Hendrick Motorsports	Chevrolet	59
2	19	1	Kurt Busch	Chip Ganassi Racing	Chevrolet	59
3	7	22	Joey Logano	Team Penske	Ford	59
4	8	12	Ryan Blaney	Team Penske	Ford	59
5	5	88	Alex Bowman	Hendrick Motorsports	Chevrolet	59
6	9	3	Austin Dillon	Richard Childress Racing	Chevrolet	59
7	16	9	Chase Elliott	Hendrick Motorsports	Chevrolet	59
8	18	10	Aric Almirola	Stewart-Haas Racing	Ford	59
9	4	6	Ryan Newman	Roush Fenway Racing	Ford	59
10	10	41	Daniel Suárez	Stewart-Haas Racing	Ford	58
11	11	40	Jamie McMurray	Spire Motorsports	Chevrolet	58
12	6	4	Kevin Harvick	Stewart-Haas Racing	Ford	57
13	1	21	Paul Menard	Wood Brothers Racing	Ford	55
14	2	18	Kyle Busch	Joe Gibbs Racing	Toyota	55
15	12	19	Martin Truex Jr.	Joe Gibbs Racing	Toyota	55
16	15	14	Clint Bowyer	Stewart-Haas Racing	Ford	55
17	17	11	Denny Hamlin	Joe Gibbs Racing	Toyota	55
18	3	2	Brad Keselowski	Team Penske	Ford	55
19	14	42	Kyle Larson	Chip Ganassi Racing	Chevrolet	55
20	20	20	Erik Jones	Joe Gibbs Racing	Toyota	55
Official race results

== Media ==
FS1 covered the race on the television side; Mike Joy, Darrell Waltrip, and Jeff Gordon handled the call from the broadcast booth, while Vince Welch and Matt Yocum reported from pit road.

=== Television ===
FS1
Booth announcers	Pit reporters
Lap-by-lap: Mike Joy; Color commentator: Jeff Gordon; Color commentator: Darrell Waltrip	Vince Welch; Matt Yocum

=== Radio ===
MRN Radio
Booth announcers	Turn announcers	Pit reporters
Lead announcer: Alex Hayden; Announcer: Jeff Striegle; Announcer: Rusty Wallace	Turns 1 & 2: Dave Moody; Backstretch: Mike Bagley; Turns 3 & 4: Kyle Rickey	Winston Kelley; Steve Post; Dillon Welch; Kim Coon
