= Mike Wheeler (NASCAR) =

American NASCAR crew chief (born 1978)

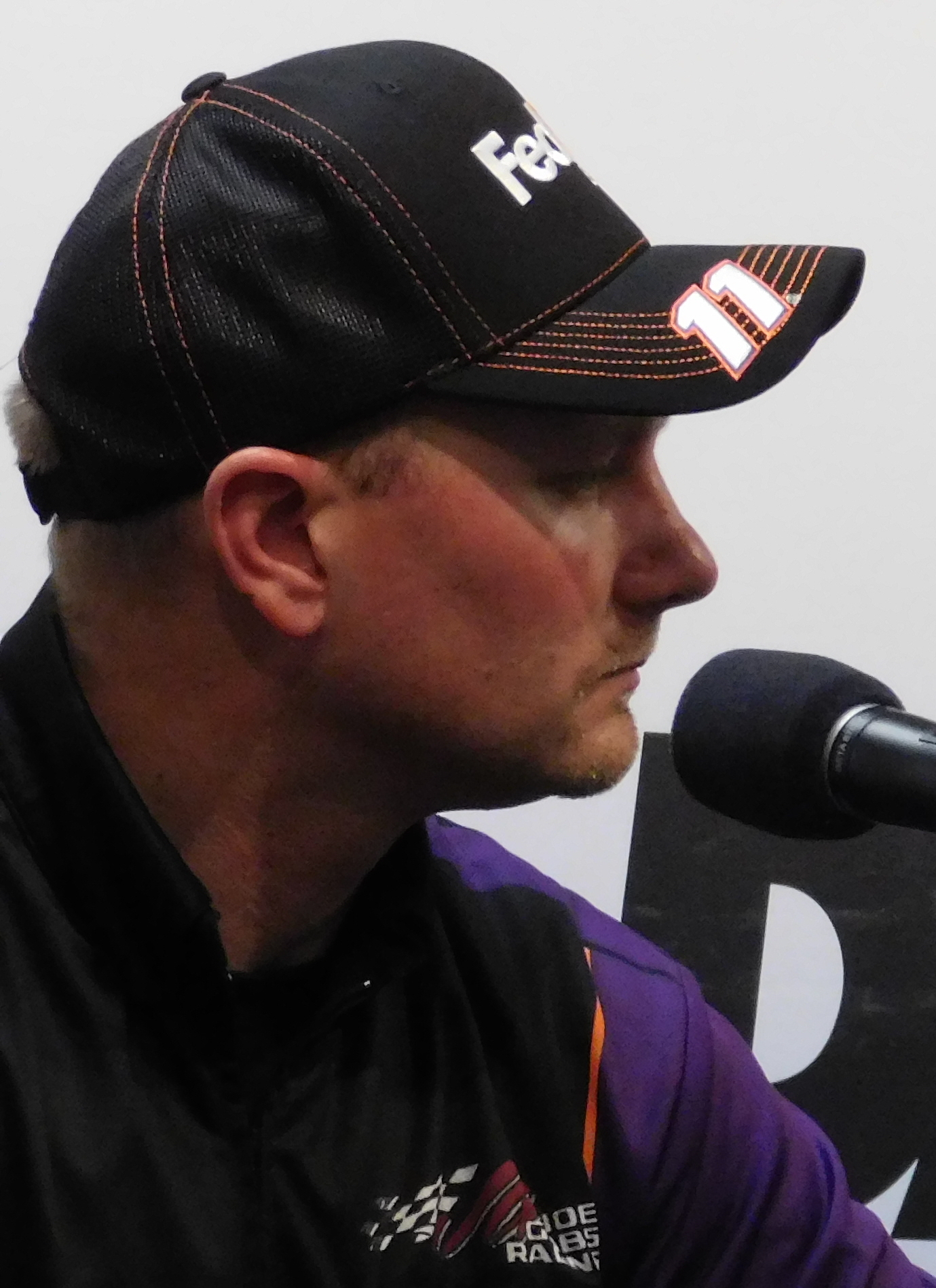
- Wheeler at Daytona International Speedway in 2016

Personal information
- Nationality: (United States) American
- Born: Michael Carl Wheeler; November 4, 1978 (age 48) Southold, New York, U.S.

Sport
- Country: United States
- Sport: NASCAR Cup Series
- Team: 23. 23XI Racing

Michael Carl Wheeler (born November 4, 1978), also known by his nickname "Wheels", is an American former NASCAR crew chief and is the current Director of Competition for 23XI Racing in the NASCAR Cup Series.

Wheeler previously worked for Joe Gibbs Racing from 2005 to 2018 as an engineer and a crew chief in both the Cup and Xfinity Series. He moved over to the JGR-aligned Leavine Family Racing for the next two years, working as a crew chief in 2019 and then as the team's competition director for 2020.

== Career ==
=== Engineering ===
Wheeler became the No. 11 team's engineer in 2005 with Jason Leffler. Even when Leffler left JGR, he stayed on the team with new driver Hamlin until the end of 2015.

=== 2014: Interim crew chief ===
Wheeler'üs first crew chief experience came in the Cup Series with Hamlin in 2014, when regular crew chief Darian Grubb was suspended six races for car violations. Wheeler guided Hamlin to three top tens and a top five in six races.

=== 2015: No. 20 JGR Xfinity Series team ===
Wheeler was made crew chief of Joe Gibbs Racing's No. 20 Xfinity Series entry before the start of the 2015 season. He did a fair amount of adjusting during the season, as JGR rotated through eight drivers. Wheeler scored nine pole positions, four wins, one with Erik Jones and three with Hamlin. Hamlin, Jones and Matt Kenseth all scored five or more top ten finishes.

=== 2016–2018: No. 11 JGR Cup Series team ===
Wheeler was named crew chief for Hamlin before the start of the 2016 season after serving as his race engineer for several seasons. According to both parties, Hamlin had promised Wheeler his head crew chief job six or seven years before he finally got the job. In the first race of the season, Wheeler shepherded Hamlin to a win in the 2016 Daytona 500.

=== 2019–2020: Leavine Family Racing ===
After leading Hamlin and the No. 11 team for three years, it was revealed in November 2018 that Wheeler would move to Leavine Family Racing for the 2019 Monster Energy NASCAR Cup Series to be crew chief for the organization's No. 95 entry, driven by Matt DiBenedetto. On September 24, 2019, Leavine Family Racing announced that Wheeler would be promoted to competition director for the team in 2020 while Jason Ratcliff would replace him as the crew chief of the No. 95, now driven by Christopher Bell.

=== 2021–present: 23XI Racing ===
On October 30, 2020, 23XI Racing announced that Wheeler would be the crew chief for their No. 23 with Bubba Wallace in 2021.

In September 2021, 23XI Racing announced that Wheeler would be promoted to Director of Competition.

== Personal life ==
Born on November 4, 1978, in Southold, New York, Wheeler attended Southold High School and later Kettering University to pursue a degree in mechanical engineering. He graduated from the college in 2002, and currently resides in Huntersville, North Carolina.
