= Garrett Smithley =

American racing driver (born 1992)

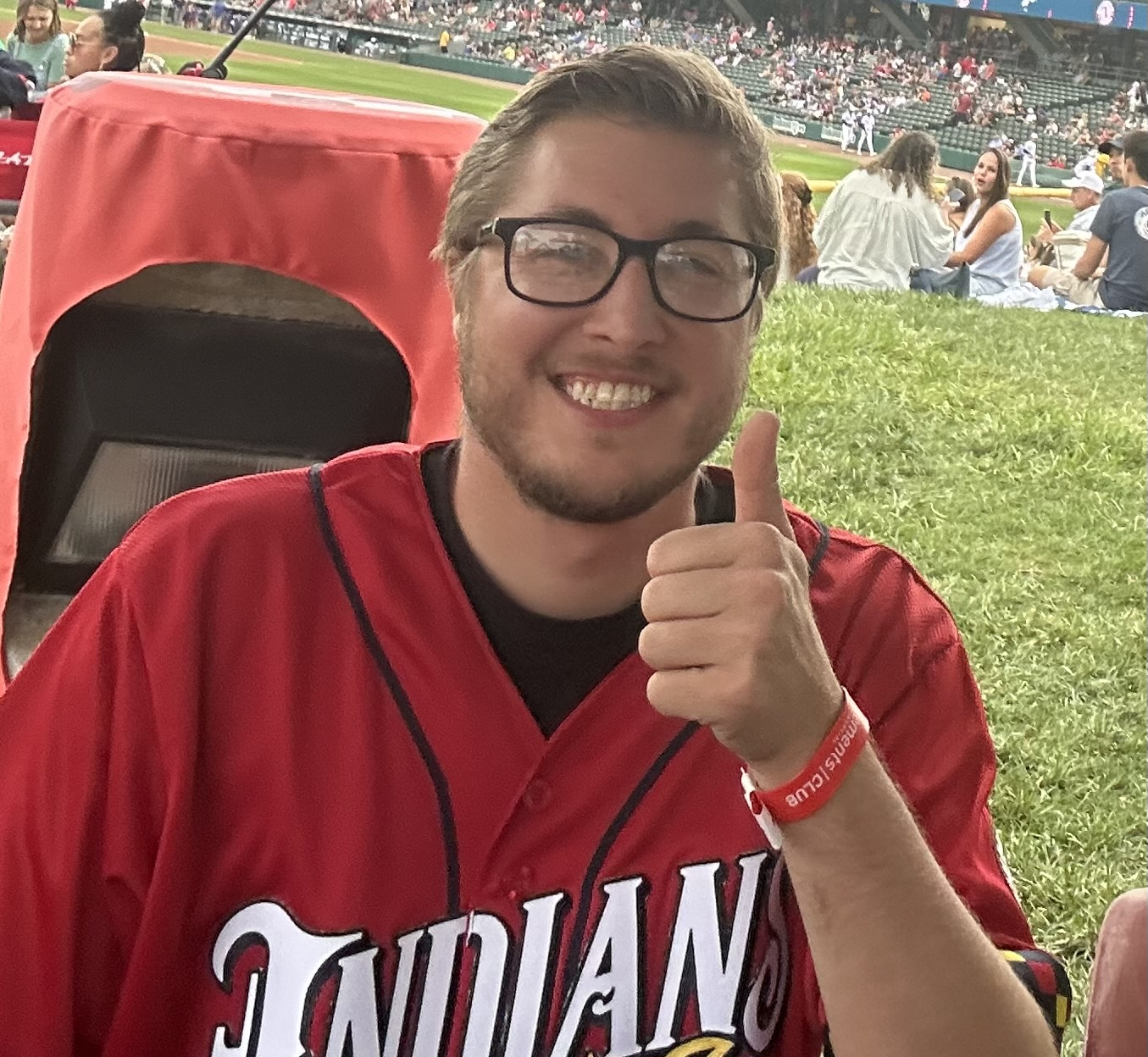
- Smithley at Victory Field in 2026
- Born: Garrett Kirk Smithley; April 27, 1992 (age 34); Ligonier, Pennsylvania, U.S.

NASCAR Cup Series career
- 76 races run over 5 years
- 2022 position: 51st
- Best finish: 48th (2020)
- First race: 2018 FireKeepers Casino 400 (Michigan)
- Last race: 2022 NASCAR Cup Series Championship Race (Phoenix)
Wins	Top tens	Poles
0	0	0

NASCAR O'Reilly Auto Parts Series career
- 228 races run over 12 years
- 2026 position: 30th
- Best finish: 18th (2016)
- First race: 2015 Ford EcoBoost 300 (Homestead)
- Last race: 2026 O'Reilly Auto Parts 300 (Homestead)
Wins	Top tens	Poles
0	7	0

NASCAR FedEx Freight Truck Series career
- 10 races run over 5 years
- 2023 position: 105th
- Best finish: 36th (2015)
- First race: 2015 Hyundai Construction Equipment 200 (Atlanta)
- Last race: 2023 Love's RV Stop 250 (Talladega)
Wins	Top tens	Poles
0	0	0

ARCA Menards Series career
- 5 races run over 3 years
- Best finish: 64th (2013)
- First race: 2013 Pocono ARCA 200 (Pocono)
- Last race: 2015 Lucas Oil 200 (Daytona)
Wins	Top tens	Poles
0	0	0
- Statistics up to date as of November 7, 2026.

Garrett Kirk Smithley (born April 27, 1992) is an American professional stock car racing driver. He last competed part-time in the NASCAR O'Reilly Auto Parts Series, driving the No. 0 Chevrolet Camaro SS for SS-Green Light Racing with BRK Racing, and the No. 42 Chevrolet Camaro SS for Young's Motorsports. He has previously competed in the NASCAR Cup Series, NASCAR Craftsman Truck Series, and ARCA Menards Series.

== Racing career ==
Smithley began his racing career in 2007, his sophomore year in high school, in Bandolero cars at Atlanta Motor Speedway and Lanier National Speedway, and won the Rookie of the Year in 2008. He credits being cast in a school play as a freshman with giving him the confidence needed to race. He moved up to Legends car racing with Peachtree City Golf Carts after having his golf cart stolen and buying a new one there. Smithley credits that relationship as keeping him racing past Bandoleros, as his family did not have the money to advance to Legends. He was chosen to be part of the Richard Petty Driver Search in his first year after high school.

Growing up, Dale Jarrett and Carl Edwards were two of Smithley's role models. Smithley was attracted to Jarrett at a young age because of his paint scheme, which depicted an American flag.

=== ARCA Racing Series ===
Smithley competed in three events in 2013, driving Derrike Cope's cars. His first start, at Pocono Raceway, was Smithley's first stock car race. His one start in 2014 was an 18th at Talladega for Wes Gonder. In 2015, his one start for Rick Ware was hampered by engine problems.

=== Craftsman Truck Series ===
Smithley made his Truck Series debut at his home track, Atlanta Motor Speedway, driving the No. 63 Chevrolet Silverado for MB Motorsports. He made three more starts in the 2015 season, scoring a high finish of fourteenth at Michigan. He returned to Atlanta with MB Motorsports for his first start of 2016, finishing eighteenth.

In March 2019, Smithley returned to the series at Texas Motor Speedway, driving the No. 42 for Chad Finley Racing; the run was part of an effort by Smithley to race in all three NASCAR national series in one weekend. The following year, he signed with Niece Motorsports for the Charlotte Truck event.

=== O'Reilly Auto Parts Series ===
Smithley made his Xfinity Series debut in the final race of 2015, at Homestead, driving the No. 70 Chevrolet Camaro for Derrike Cope Racing, started 34th, and finished 28th.

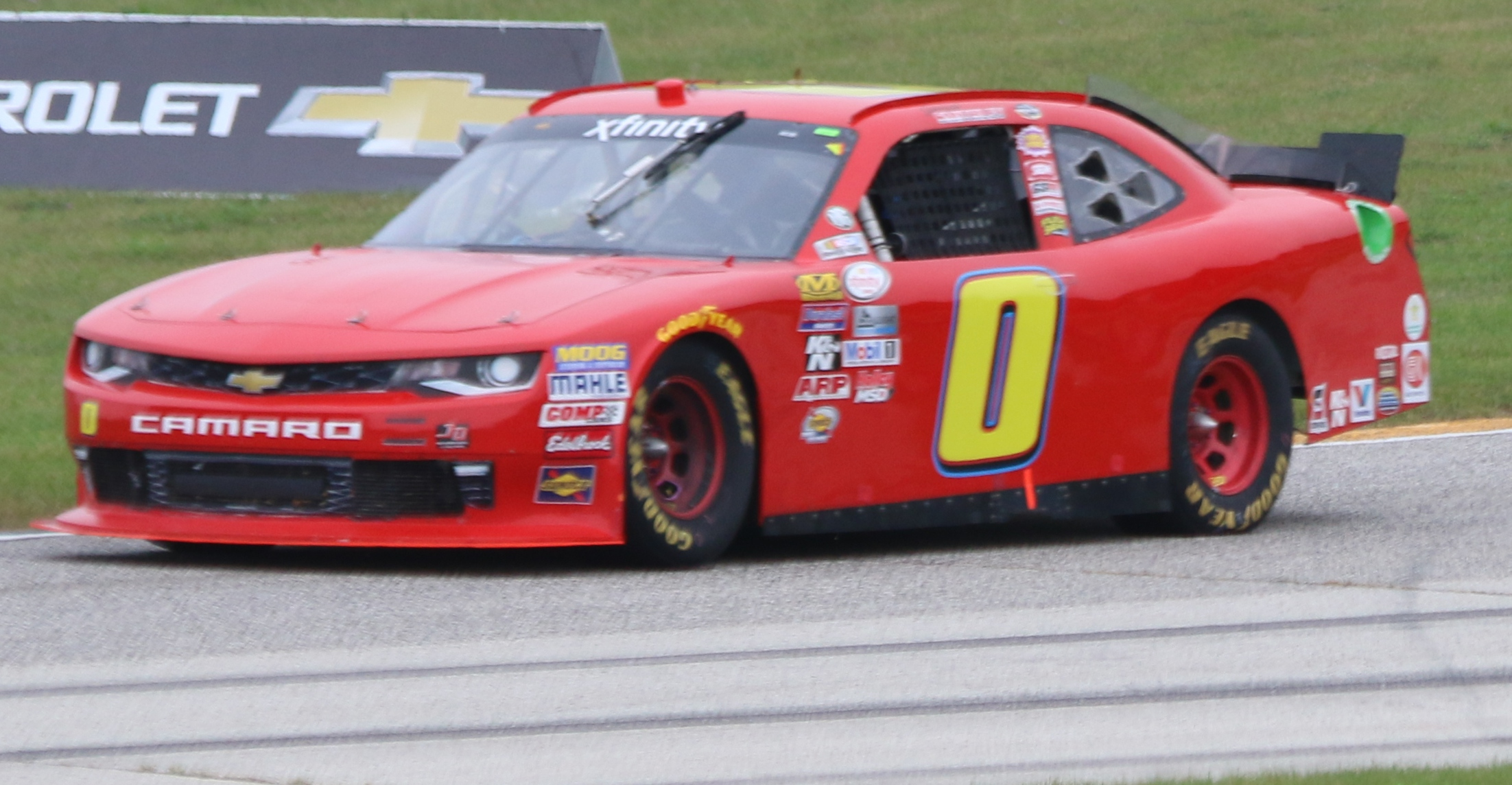
Smithley at Road America in 2016

On February 16, 2016, it was announced that Smithley would race for JD Motorsports, driving the No. 0 Chevrolet Camaro, and would also compete for the NASCAR Rookie of the Year honors. Although the original agreement was only for three races, he ran every race except the PowerShares QQQ 300. Finishing eighteenth in series points, he finished in the top-fifteen in both restrictor plate races, including one at Talladega Superspeedway. Smithley cracked the top-twenty five times outside of plate tracks, but troubles at road courses (such as running the bus stop at Watkins Glen, resulting in an engine failure) put a slight damper on his season. Another incident at Talladega left Chris Cockrum mad at Smithley; Smithley turned Cockrum off the second turn, collecting Joey Gase in the process. Cockrum in the infield after the wreck, accused Smithley of not knowing how to race at restrictor plate tracks. Smithley, discussing his Wikipedia page in a 2018 podcast, shared his side of the story, claiming Cockrum moved up and there was only "slight contact" that led to the wreck.

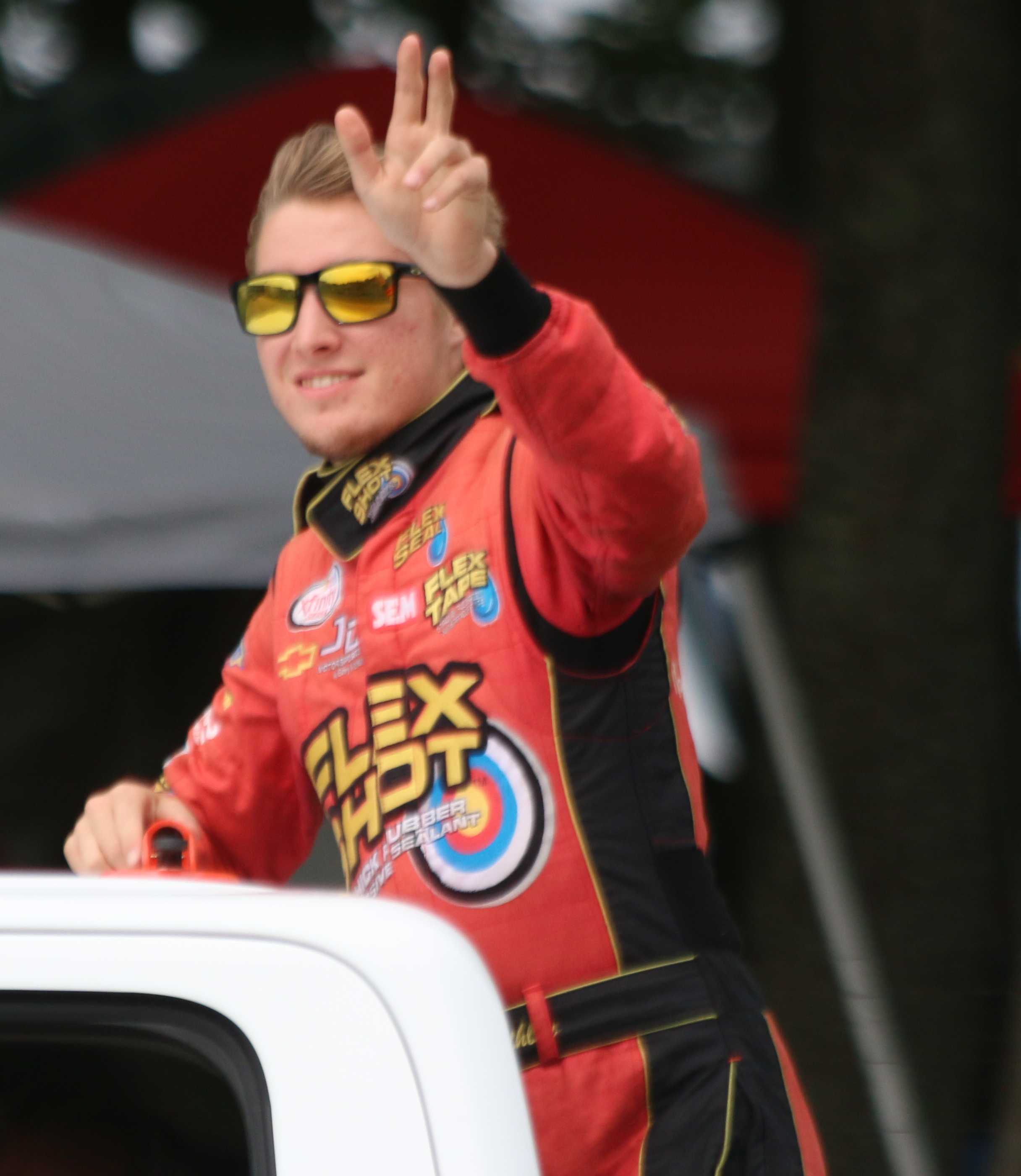
Smithley at Road America in 2017

Smithley returned full-time to JD Motorsports in 2017. He ran all the races so far except Chicagoland, where he ran in MBM Motorsports' No. 40 car to make room for Vinnie Miller, who was making his series debut. He scored his first two Xfinity top-10 finishes, at Daytona and Iowa, and led his first Xfinity Series lap at Talladega. The rest of the season didn't go as well in a self-described "sophomore slump". Besides driving, Smithley has also undertaken a publicist-like role within his team, calling companies before races each week to see if they would like to sponsor him. He has opened a personal LLC to help with the finances of sponsorship, mainly taxes.

On February 7, 2018, Smithley was announced to be returning in the 0 car for the 2018 season. In the season opener, Smithley overcame a spin to score his first NASCAR top-five, coming in fifth. He also switched crew chiefs, bringing Wayne Carroll on board. It was then announced two days after the race that Smithley would switch numbers with fellow JD Motorsports driver Matt Mills for the next two races, with Smithley taking Mills' No. 15 and Mills taking Smithley's No. 0. Talking about life at-track in summer 2018, Smithley said that he does not like to make friends with other Xfinity Series regulars, since in previous experiences, making friends had made him less aggressive and more willing to cut other racers' breaks.

Smithley returned to JDM in 2019. For throwback weekend at Darlington Raceway, Smithley drove a tribute paint scheme to MB Motorsports owner Mike Mittler, who died earlier in 2019. Mittler gave Smithley his first opportunity in the NASCAR Camping World Truck Series.

In 2020, Smithley joined SS-Green Light Racing as part of an alliance with Rick Ware Racing, debuting with the team at Charlotte in the No. 07.

On May 24, 2022, Austin Konenski from Sportsnaut revealed that Smithley would drive the No. 36 car for DGM Racing in the race at Charlotte. DGM had announced that Alex Labbé, who had driven the car in every race that year except for the season-opener at Daytona, would not be running that race due to not being able to find a sponsor. Smithley's entry with DGM had an alliance with Rick Ware Racing. Smithley made his second Xfinity Series start in 2022 in Kansas in September in the No. 5 for B. J. McLeod Motorsports after Matt Mills, who was scheduled to drive the car, got the flu earlier in the week.

On November 1, 2022, it was announced that Smithley would run full-time for B. J. McLeod Motorsports, driving the No. 78 Chevrolet, although it was later announced that he would drive the No. 99 instead. After failing to qualify for Daytona and Auto Club, and finishing 36th at Las Vegas, he was released from the team. Smithley then drove the No. 91 Chevrolet for DGM Racing at Phoenix, and it was announced that he would run multiple races in the entry, although it would be his only start for the team that year. One week later, it was revealed that Smithley would return to JD Motorsports, this time in the No. 4 Chevrolet, replacing Bayley Currey, for the remainder of the schedule, although he only ran select races with a best finish of sixteenth at Talladega.

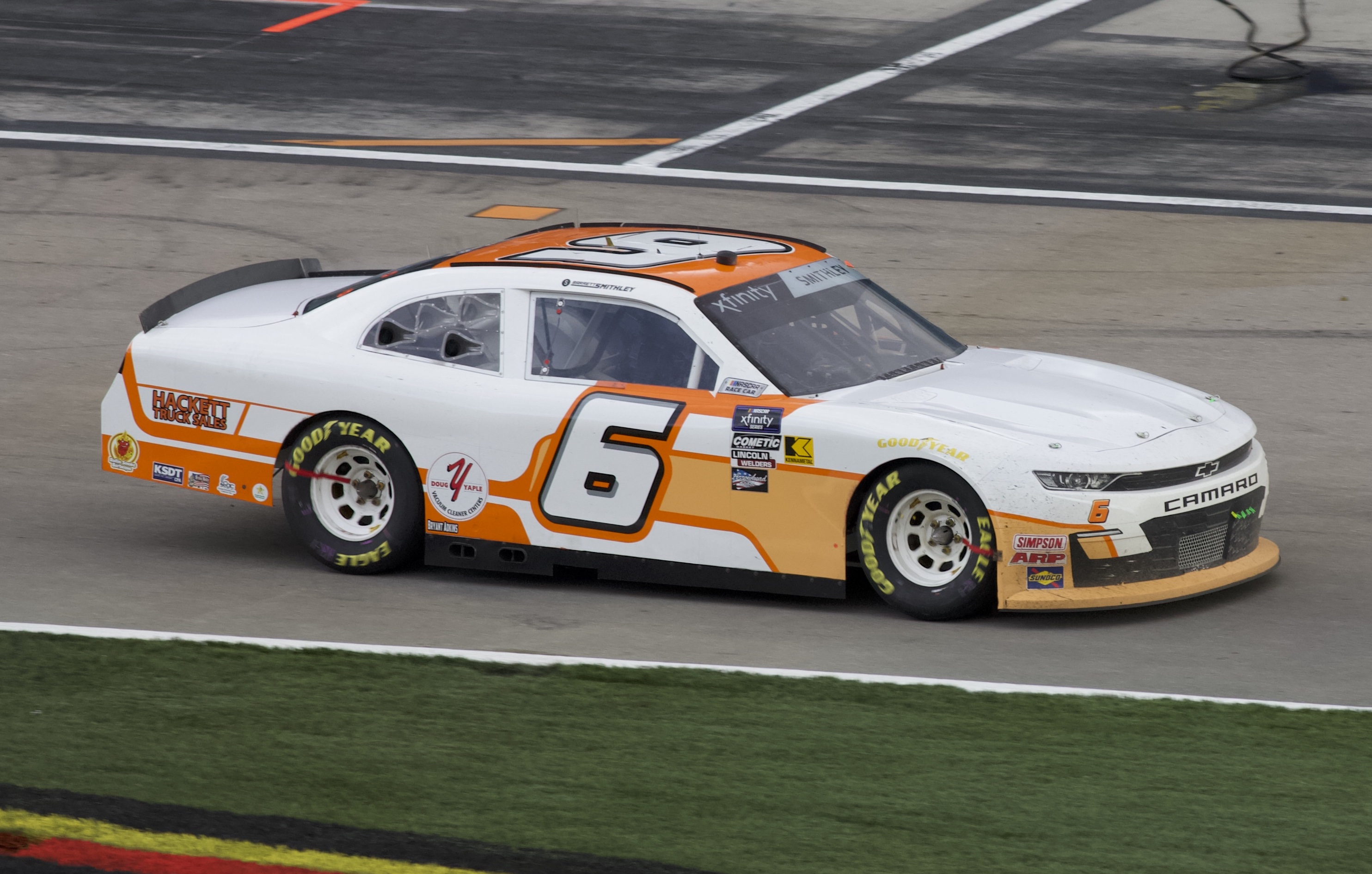
Smithley's No. 6 car at Las Vegas Motor Speedway in 2024.

On February 13, 2024, it was announced that Smithley would run the No. 6 for JD in the first four races of the 2024 season. He would remain with the team until they filed for Chapter 11 Bankruptcy following the race at Pocono Raceway. He would run the remainder of the season on a limited schedule, driving the No. 45 for Alpha Prime Racing and the No. 53 for Joey Gase Motorsports.

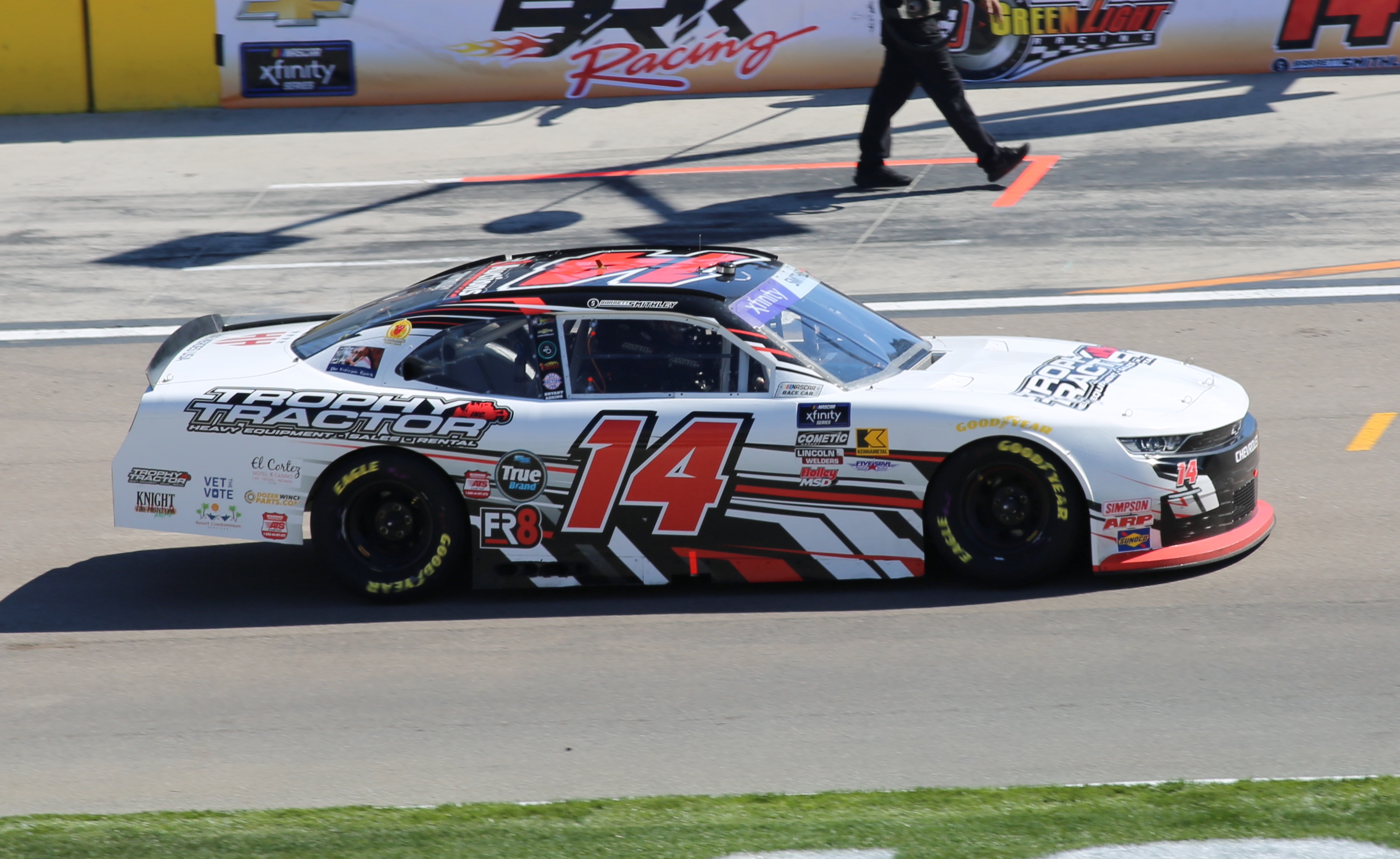
Smithley's No. 14 car at Las Vegas Motor Speedway in 2025

On December 19, 2024, it was announced that Smithley would drive the SS-Green Light Racing No. 14 full-time during the 2025 season. On January 24, SSGLR announced that Beth and Randy Knighton, the owners of Knight Fire Protection, one of the sponsors of the No. 14 car in 2025, would have an ownership stake (BRK Racing) in that car. On February 24, 2025, Smithley announced that he would not be in the car at Circuit of The Americas and that Carson Hocevar would replace him. Smithley decided to do this so the car would qualify and to guarantee that he and his team would have a successful season. Smithley would be back in the car at Phoenix. He DNQ'ed at Talladega and the Charlotte Roval. At the seasons' end, he finished thirtieth in points.

On December 10, 2025, it was revealed that Smithley would return to SS-Green Light Racing with BRK Racing to drive their now-renumbered No. 0 for a majority of the season. He started the 2026 season with a DNQ at Daytona. The next week at Atlanta, he finished fourteenth.

=== Cup Series ===
On June 1, 2018, reports surfaced that Smithley will make his Monster Energy NASCAR Cup Series debut at Michigan with StarCom Racing in the team's No. 99 entry, though the reports were not immediately confirmed by Smithley. Smithley retired from the race after just one lap with a transmission issue. He later ran two other races that season, including one with Premium Motorsports.

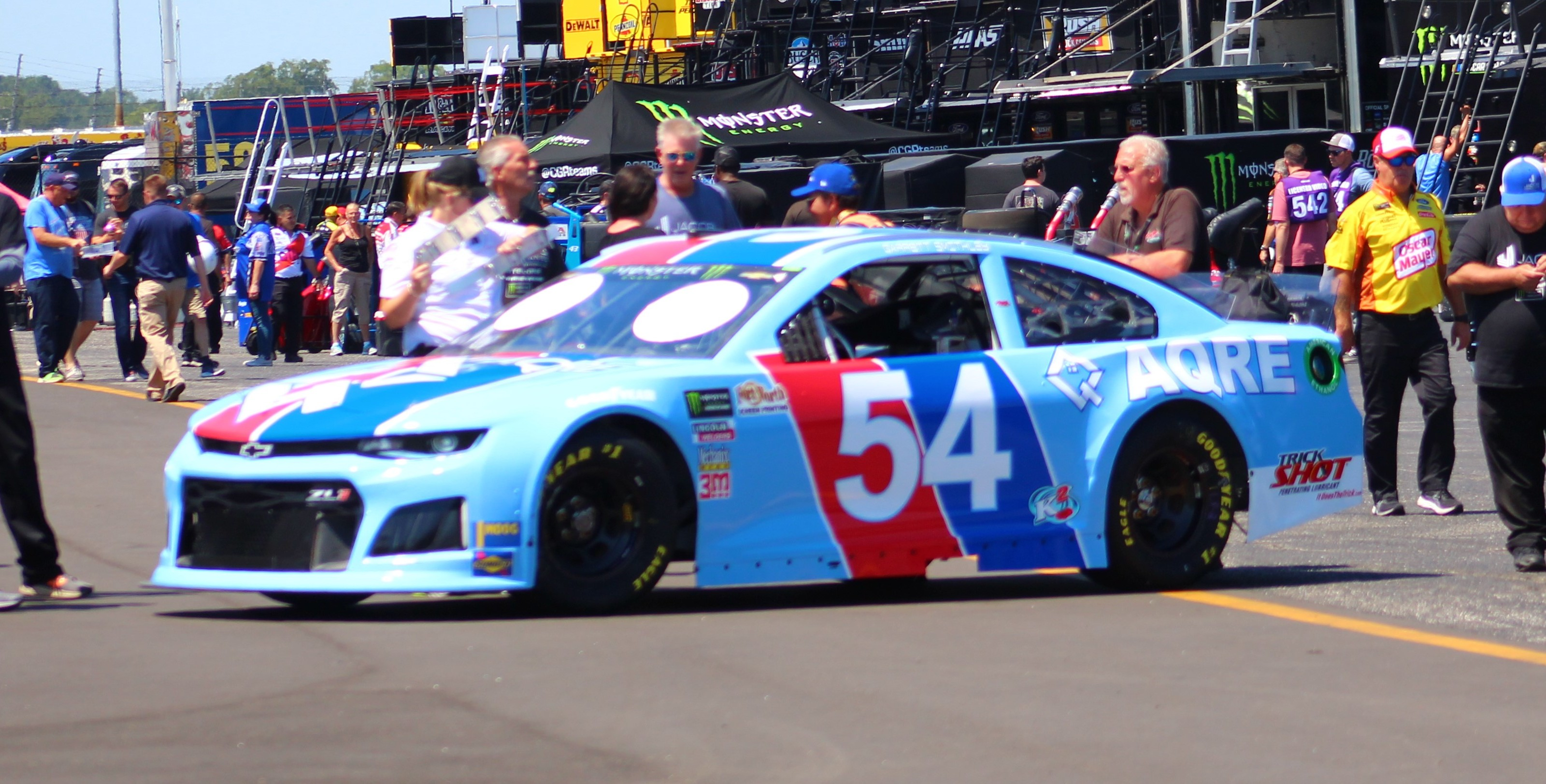
Smithley's No. 54 at Darlington Raceway in 2019

In 2019, Smithley picked up a part-time ride with Spire Motorsports to drive the No. 77 Chevrolet starting at Atlanta Motor Speedway. In his limited schedule, Smithley aimed to gain respect from the Cup Series competitors. He cracked the top-thirty with a 28th-place finish at the 2019 Brickyard 400. While driving the No. 52 Rick Ware Racing Ford at the 2019 South Point 400 at Las Vegas Motor Speedway, he was heavily criticized by Kyle Busch, who blamed him and Joey Gase for costing him a solid run.

Smithley returned to RWR for the 2020 NASCAR Cup Series season, racing on an "expanded" schedule beginning with the 2020 Pennzoil 400 at Las Vegas. He also made starts with Spire and B. J. McLeod Motorsports.

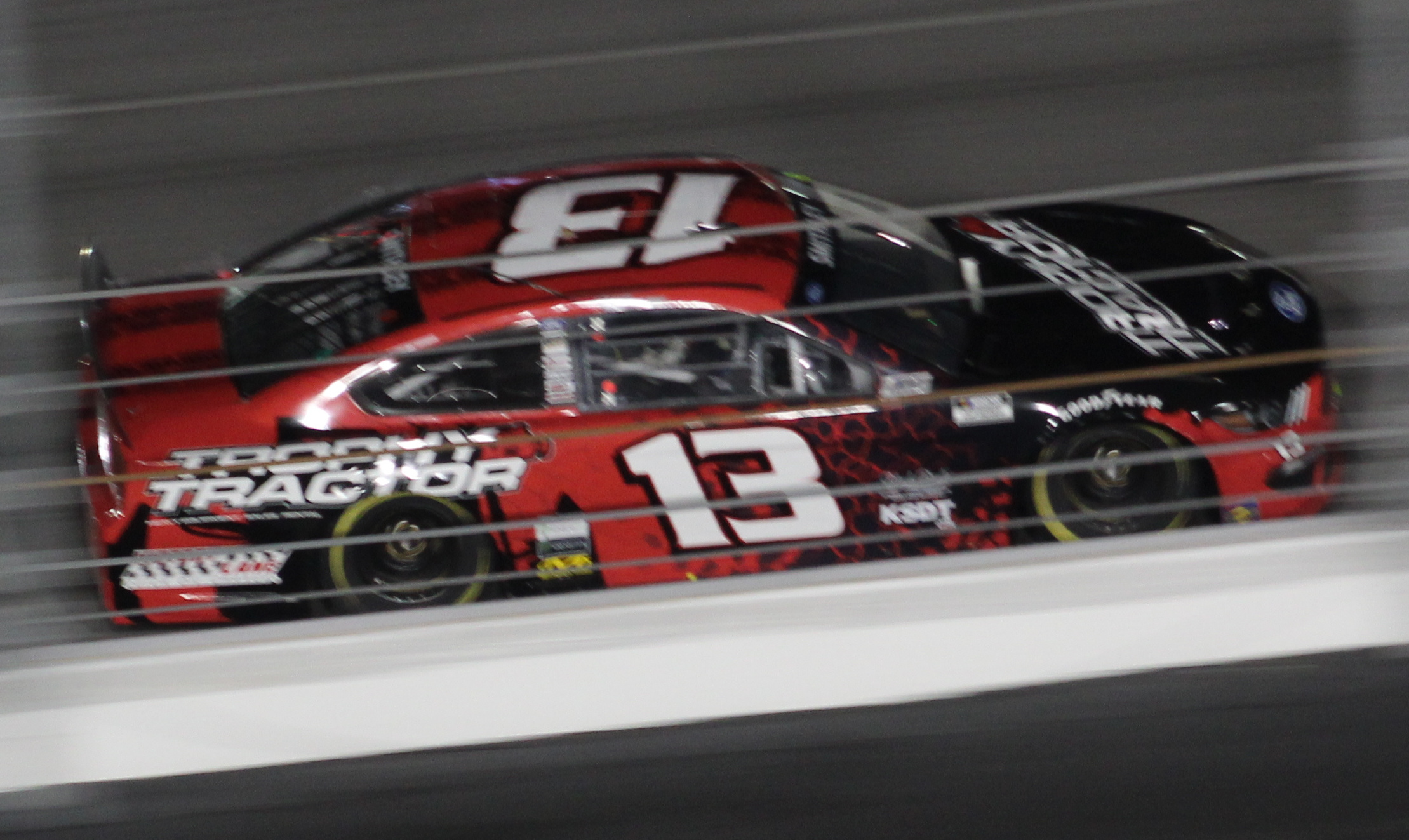
Smithley in the No. 13 at Daytona International Speedway in 2021

For 2021, Smithley remained with RWR for another part-time schedule in the Cup Series. He also attempted to qualify for the Daytona 500 for the first time in his career. With all four of the Rick Ware cars taken, Smithley drove the No. 13 (previously No. 49) for MBM Motorsports, a team he made one Xfinity Series start for in 2017. Chad Finchum was originally scheduled to drive the car in the race, but he was taken out of it because he had no sponsor lined up while Smithley did have one (Trophy Tractor).

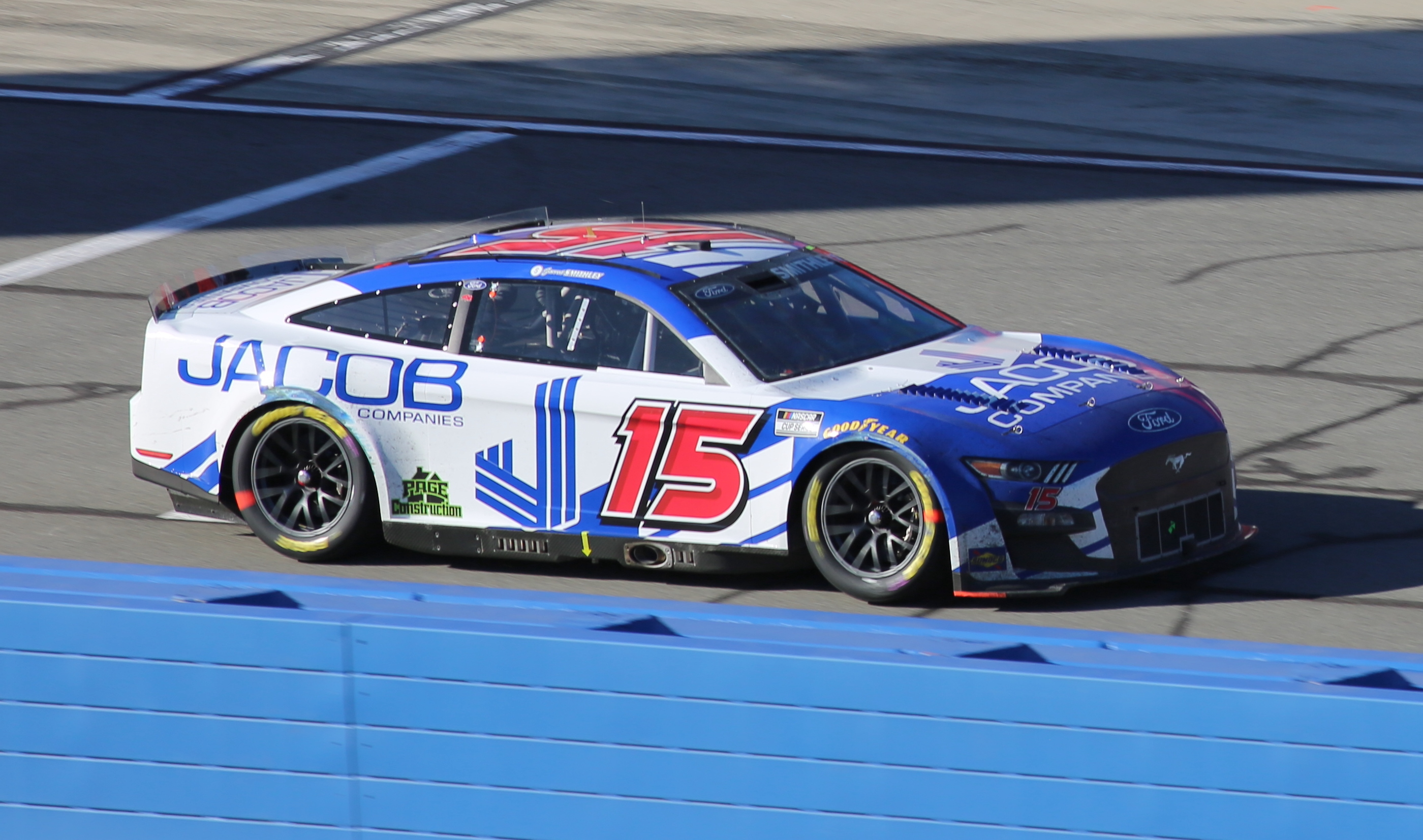
Smithley in the No. 15 at Auto Club Speedway in 2022

In 2022, Smithley remained with RWR, this time in the No. 15 Ford, for another partial schedule. He would get a best finish of 21st in his first start of the year at Auto Club Speedway in six races.

Smithley competed in the 2025 Cook Out Clash at Bowman Gray Stadium, driving the No. 66 Ford for Garage 66 (the new branding of MBM Motorsports' Cup Series operations).

== Personal life ==
Smithley's father and both of his grandfathers were military servicemen. He was born in Pennsylvania, but later moved to Virginia when he was six, and then Georgia in the sixth grade. When he was a child, Smithley played baseball and football, but also was active in dance and chorus, eventually becoming a theater participant at McIntosh High School, even being named as the lead in Charlie and the Chocolate Factory along with being an active member of the Boy Scouts of America. He credits his theater and drama experience as giving him the confidence necessary to take chances in his racing career.

After racing, Smithley hopes to become a television announcer.

== Motorsports career results ==
=== NASCAR ===
(key) (Bold – Pole position awarded by qualifying time. Italics – Pole position earned by points standings or practice time. * – Most laps led.)

==== Cup Series ====
NASCAR Cup Series results
Year	Team	No.	Make	1	2	3	4	5	6	7	8	9	10	11	12	13	14	15	16	17	18	19	20	21	22	23	24	25	26	27	28	29	30	31	32	33	34	35	36	NCSC	Pts	Ref
2018	StarCom Racing	99	Chevy	DAY	ATL	LVS	PHO	CAL	MAR	TEX	BRI	RCH	TAL	DOV	KAN	CLT	POC	MCH; 39	SON	CHI	DAY	KEN; 36	NHA	POC	GLN															67th	0^{1}	
2018	Premium Motorsports	7	Chevy																							MCH; 32	BRI	DAR	IND	LVS	RCH	ROV	DOV	TAL	KAN	MAR	TEX	PHO	HOM	67th	0^{1}	
2019	Spire Motorsports	77	Chevy	DAY	ATL; 36	LVS	PHO	CAL; 36	MAR	TEX; 32	BRI	RCH	TAL	DOV	KAN	CLT	POC									MCH; 35	BRI													55th	0^{1}	
2019	Premium Motorsports	15	Chevy															MCH; 30	SON	CHI	DAY	KEN	NHA	POC	GLN															55th	0^{1}	
2019	Rick Ware Racing	54	Chevy																									DAR; 35												55th	0^{1}	
2019	Rick Ware Racing	52	Ford																										IND; 28	LVS; 35	RCH	ROV; 36			KAN; 34		TEX; 36			55th	0^{1}	
2019	Rick Ware Racing	54	Ford																														DOV; 33	TAL						55th	0^{1}	
2019	Rick Ware Racing	52	Chevy																																	MAR; 32				55th	0^{1}	
2019	Rick Ware Racing	51	Chevy																																			PHO; 31	HOM	55th	0^{1}	
2020	Rick Ware Racing	51	Chevy	DAY	LVS; 35	CAL; 34	PHO; 35																																	48th	0^{2}	
2020	Rick Ware Racing	53	Chevy					DAR; 37	DAR; 34	CLT; 33	CLT; 40		ATL; 35				POC; 33	POC; 32	IND; 24	KEN; 33	TEX																			48th	0^{2}	
2020	Spire Motorsports	77	Chevy									BRI; 26		MAR; 36	HOM							KAN; 26	NHA; 31															MAR; 39		48th	0^{2}	
2020	B. J. McLeod Motorsports	78	Chevy													TAL; 34																BRI; 32	LVS	TAL	ROV	KAN				48th	0^{2}	
2020	Rick Ware Racing	53	Ford																					MCH; 35	MCH; 34	DRC; 36											TEX; 31			48th	0^{2}	
2020	Tommy Baldwin Racing	7	Chevy																								DOV; 37	DOV; 35	DAY	DAR	RCH								PHO; 37	48th	0^{2}	
2021	MBM Motorsports	13	Ford	DAY; DNQ																																				56th	0^{1}	
2021	Rick Ware Racing	53	Chevy		DRC; 27	HOM; 31	LVS; 31	PHO; 34	ATL	BRD	MAR	RCH; 35	TAL	KAN; 33	DAR	DOV; 32				NSH; 25	POC; 29	POC; 36	ROA	ATL; 31	NHA; 33			MCH; 32	DAY; 30	DAR		BRI; 30	LVS; 35		ROV; 34					56th	0^{1}	
2021	Rick Ware Racing	53	Ford														COA; 28		SON; 32							GLN; 36	IRC; 28													56th	0^{1}	
2021	Rick Ware Racing	51	Chevy															CLT; 34													RCH; 31									56th	0^{1}	
2021	Rick Ware Racing	15	Chevy																															TAL; 29		TEX; 24	KAN	MAR; 33	PHO; 31	56th	0^{1}	
2022	Rick Ware Racing	15	Ford	DAY	CAL; 21	LVS; 30	PHO; 32	ATL	COA	RCH	MAR	BRD	TAL	DOV	DAR	KAN	CLT	GTW	SON	NSH	ROA	ATL; 27	NHA	POC	IRC	MCH	RCH	GLN	DAY	DAR	KAN	BRI	TEX; 23	TAL	ROV	LVS	HOM	MAR	PHO; 33	51st	0^{1}	

===== Daytona 500 =====
Year	Team	Manufacturer	Start	Finish
2021	MBM Motorsports	Ford	DNQ	

==== O'Reilly Auto Parts Series ====
NASCAR O'Reilly Auto Parts Series results
Year	Team	No.	Make	1	2	3	4	5	6	7	8	9	10	11	12	13	14	15	16	17	18	19	20	21	22	23	24	25	26	27	28	29	30	31	32	33	NOAPSC	Pts	Ref
2015	Derrike Cope Racing	70	Chevy	DAY	ATL	LVS	PHO	CAL	TEX	BRI	RCH	TAL	IOW	CLT	DOV	MCH	CHI	DAY	KEN	NHA	IND	IOW	GLN	MOH	BRI	ROA	DAR	RCH	CHI	KEN	DOV	CLT	KAN	TEX	PHO	HOM; 28	109th	0^{1}	
2016	JD Motorsports	0	Chevy	DAY	ATL; 24	LVS; 24	PHO; 31	CAL; 23	TEX; 23	BRI; 29	RCH; 20	TAL; 12	DOV; 24	CLT; 15	POC; 27	MCH; 17	IOW; 22	DAY; 13	KEN; 24	NHA; 23	IND; 23	IOW; 22	GLN; 39	MOH; 24	BRI; 23	ROA; 40	DAR; 22	RCH; 31	CHI; 19	KEN; 17	DOV; 26	CLT; 25	KAN; 18	TEX; 25	PHO; 34	HOM; 29	18th	544	
2017	JD Motorsports	0	Chevy	DAY; 8	ATL; 27	LVS; 29	PHO; 24	CAL; 26	TEX; 30	BRI; 34	RCH; 29	TAL; 21	CLT; 24	DOV; 27	POC; 35	MCH; 29	IOW; 10	DAY; 28	KEN; 26	NHA; 23	IND; 21	IOW; 35	GLN; 24	MOH; 30	BRI; 34	ROA; 27	DAR; 26	RCH; 32		KEN; 25	DOV; 29	CLT; 23	KAN; 28	TEX; 24	PHO; 25	HOM; 24	21st	348	
2017	MBM Motorsports	40	Toyota																										CHI; 37								21st	348	
2018	JD Motorsports	0	Chevy	DAY; 5			PHO; 28	CAL; 23	TEX; 27	BRI; 17	RCH; 27	TAL; 10	DOV; 32	CLT; 14	POC; 26	MCH; 26	IOW; 25	CHI; 19	DAY; 28	KEN; 19	NHA; 32	IOW; 25	GLN; 23	MOH; 28	BRI; 16	ROA; 15		IND; 20	LVS; 18	RCH; 24	ROV; 25	DOV; 23	KAN; 13	TEX; 20	PHO; 26	HOM; 27	19th	496	
2018	JD Motorsports	15	Chevy		ATL; 25	LVS; 23																															19th	496	
2018	JD Motorsports	4	Chevy																								DAR; 20										19th	496	
2019	JD Motorsports	0	Chevy	DAY; 24	ATL; 17	LVS; 18	PHO; 22	CAL; 19	TEX; 31	BRI; 22	RCH; 19	TAL; 12	DOV; 23	CLT; 17	POC; 29	MCH; 27	IOW; 29	CHI; 25	DAY; 14	KEN; 19	NHA; 24	IOW; 22	GLN; 24	MOH; 20	BRI; 28	ROA; 33	DAR; 29	IND; 14	LVS; 23	RCH; 27		DOV; 26	KAN; 33	TEX; 17	PHO; 27	HOM; 32	19th	443	
2019	JD Motorsports	4	Chevy																												ROV; 33						19th	443	
2020	SS-Green Light Racing	07	Chevy	DAY	LVS	CAL	PHO	DAR	CLT; 31	BRI	ATL; 24	HOM	HOM	TAL	POC	IRC	KEN; 31	KEN; 16	TEX	KAN	ROA	DRC	DOV	DOV	DAY	DAR	RCH	RCH	BRI	LVS	TAL; 8	ROV	KAN	TEX	MAR	PHO	43rd	75^{2}	
2021	SS-Green Light Racing with Rick Ware Racing	17	Chevy	DAY	DRC	HOM	LVS; 24	PHO	ATL	MAR	TAL	DAR	DOV	COA	CLT	MOH	TEX; 25	NSH	POC	ROA	ATL	NHA	GLN	IRC	MCH	DAY	DAR	RCH	BRI	LVS	TAL; 19	ROV	TEX				46th	62	
2021	SS-Green Light Racing with Rick Ware Racing	17	Toyota																															KAN; 18	MAR	PHO	46th	62	
2022	DGM Racing	36	Chevy	DAY	CAL	LVS	PHO	ATL	COA	RCH	MAR	TAL	DOV	DAR	TEX	CLT; 21	POR	NSH	ROA	ATL	NHA	POC	IRC	MCH	GLN	DAY	DAR										51st	47	
2022	B. J. McLeod Motorsports	5	Chevy																									KAN; 32	BRI								51st	47	
2022	B. J. McLeod Motorsports	78	Chevy																											TEX; 23	TAL	ROV	LVS; 25	HOM	MAR	PHO	51st	47	
2023	B. J. McLeod Motorsports	99	Chevy	DAY; DNQ	CAL; DNQ	LVS; 36																															38th	125	
2023	DGM Racing	91	Chevy				PHO; 32																														38th	125	
2023	JD Motorsports	4	Chevy					ATL; 36	COA; DNQ	RCH; 30	MAR; DNQ	TAL; 16	DOV; 31	DAR; DNQ	CLT; 33	PIR; 24	SON	NSH	CSC	ATL; 26	NHA	POC; 21	ROA	MCH; 30	IRC	GLN			KAN; 25	BRI	TEX; DNQ	ROV	LVS; DNQ	HOM	MAR	PHO	38th	125	
2023	JD Motorsports	6	Chevy																								DAY; 16	DAR									38th	125	
2024	JD Motorsports	6	Chevy	DAY; 16	ATL; 34	LVS; 29	PHO; 26	COA	RCH; 21	MAR; 29	TEX; 34	TAL; DNQ	DOV; 30	DAR; 29	CLT; 24			IOW; 26		NSH; 36	CSC	POC															31st	191	
2024	JD Motorsports	4	Chevy													PIR; 22	SON; 27		NHA; 29																		31st	191	
2024	Alpha Prime Racing	45	Chevy																				IND; 31	MCH	DAY	DAR; 30	ATL; 23	GLN					LVS; 29	HOM	MAR; 32		31st	191	
2024	Joey Gase Motorsports	53	Ford																										BRI; 36	KAN	TAL	ROV				PHO; 30	31st	191	
2025	SS-Green Light Racing with BRK Racing	14	Chevy	DAY; 31	ATL; 24	COA	PHO; 29	LVS; 27	HOM; 31	MAR; 15	DAR; 32	BRI; 29	CAR; 22	TAL; DNQ	TEX; 30	CLT; 26	NSH	MXC	POC; 26	ATL; 23	CSC	SON	DOV; 35	IND; 25	IOW; 33	GLN; 38	DAY; 8	PIR; 25	GTW; 32	BRI	KAN; 34	ROV; DNQ	LVS; 32	TAL; 12	MAR; 30	PHO; 31	30th	247	
2026	SS-Green Light Racing with BRK Racing	0	Chevy	DAY; DNQ	ATL; 14	COA	PHO; 29	LVS	DAR; 27	MAR; 27	CAR; 29	BRI; 38	KAN	TAL; 20	TEX; 31	GLN	DOV; 31	CLT	NSH; 33	POC	COR	SON		ATL; 6	IND; 25	IOW; 29	DAY; 12	DAR; 25	GTW	BRI; 33	LVS; 25	CLT; 29	PHO; 31	TAL; 27	MAR; 35	HOM; 37	30th	243	
2026	Young's Motorsports	42	Chevy																				CHI; 18														30th	243	

==== Craftsman Truck Series ====
NASCAR Craftsman Truck Series results
Year	Team	No.	Make	1	2	3	4	5	6	7	8	9	10	11	12	13	14	15	16	17	18	19	20	21	22	23	NCTC	Pts	Ref
2015	MB Motorsports	63	Chevy	DAY	ATL; 18	MAR	KAN	CLT	DOV	TEX	GTW	IOW	KEN	ELD	POC; 16	MCH; 14	BRI	MSP	CHI	NHA	LVS	TAL	MAR	TEX	PHO	HOM; 28	36th	100	
2016	MB Motorsports	63	Chevy	DAY	ATL; 18	MAR	KAN	DOV																			98th	0^{1}	
2016	SS-Green Light Racing	07	Chevy						CLT; 29	TEX	IOW	GTW	KEN; 21	ELD	POC	BRI	MCH	MSP	CHI	NHA	LVS	TAL	MAR	TEX	PHO	HOM	98th	0^{1}	
2019	Chad Finley Racing	42	Chevy	DAY	ATL	LVS	MAR	TEX; 15	DOV	KAN	CLT	TEX	IOW	GTW	CHI	KEN	POC	ELD	MCH	BRI	MSP	LVS	TAL	MAR	PHO	HOM	105th	0^{1}	
2020	Niece Motorsports	40	Chevy	DAY	LVS	CLT; 36	ATL	HOM	POC	KEN	TEX	KAN	KAN	MCH	DAY	DOV	GTW	DAR	RCH	BRI	LVS	TAL	KAN	TEX	MAR	PHO	94th	0^{1}	
2022	Young's Motorsports	20	Chevy	DAY	LVS	ATL	COA	MAR	BRD	DAR	KAN	TEX; DNQ	CLT	GTW	SON	KNX	NSH	MOH	POC	IRP	RCH	KAN	BRI	TAL	HOM	PHO	109th	0^{1}	
2023	Young's Motorsports	02	Chevy	DAY	LVS	ATL	COA	TEX	BRD	MAR	KAN	DAR	NWS	CLT	GTW	NSH	MOH	POC	RCH	IRP	MLW	KAN	BRI	TAL; 15	HOM	PHO	105th	0^{1}	

^{*} Season still in progress
^{1} Ineligible for series points
^{2} Switched to Xfinity points prior to the spring Charlotte race

=== ARCA Racing Series ===
(key) (Bold – Pole position awarded by qualifying time. Italics – Pole position earned by points standings or practice time. * – Most laps led.)

ARCA Racing Series results
Year	Team	No.	Make	1	2	3	4	5	6	7	8	9	10	11	12	13	14	15	16	17	18	19	20	21	ARSC	Pts	Ref
2013	Derrike Cope Racing	74	Chevy	DAY	MOB	SLM	TAL	TOL	ELK	POC; 17	MCH	ROA	WIN	CHI	NJE	POC; 14	BLN	ISF	MAD	DSF	IOW	SLM	KEN; 26	KAN	64th	405	
2014	Wes Gonder Racing	11	Ford	DAY	MOB	SLM	TAL; 18	TOL	NJE	POC	MCH	ELK	WIN	CHI	IRP	POC	BLN	ISF	MAD	DSF	SLM	KEN	KAN		111th	140	
2015	Rick Ware Racing	10	Chevy	DAY; 34	MOB	NSH	SLM	TAL	TOL	NJE	POC	MCH	CHI	WIN	IOW	IRP	POC	BLN	ISF	DSF	SLM	KEN	KAN		136th	60	

=== CARS Late Model Stock Car Tour ===
(key) (Bold – Pole position awarded by qualifying time. Italics – Pole position earned by points standings or practice time. * – Most laps led. ** – All laps led.)

CARS Late Model Stock Car Tour results
Year	Team	No.	Make	1	2	3	4	5	6	7	8	9	10	11	12	13	14	15	16	CLMSCTC	Pts	Ref
2023	AK Performance	98	Chevy	SNM	FLC	HCY	ACE; 22	NWS	LGY	DOM	CRW	HCY	ACE	TCM	WKS	AAS	SBO	TCM	CRW	73rd	11	

=== CARS Super Late Model Tour ===
(key)

CARS Super Late Model Tour results
Year	Team	No.	Make	1	2	3	4	5	6	7	8	CSLMTC	Pts	Ref
2021	E33 Motorsports	51S	Chevy	HCY	GPS; 11	NSH						15th	50	
2021	Wauters Motorsports	5	Toyota				JEN; 5	HCY	MMS	TCM	SBO	15th	50	

=== CARS Pro Late Model Tour ===
(key)

CARS Pro Late Model Tour results
Year	Team	No.	Make	1	2	3	4	5	6	7	8	9	10	11	12	13	CPLMTC	Pts	Ref
2022	E33 Motorsports	15S	Ford	CRW	HCY	GPS	FCS	TCM	HCY	ACE	MMS; 9	TCM	ACE	SBO	CRW		44th	24	
2023	E33 Motorsports	4	Ford	SNM	HCY	ACE	NWS; 32	TCM	DIL	CRW	WKS	HCY	FLC	SBO	TCM	CRW	71st	3	

=== Carolina Pro Late Model Series ===
(key) (Bold – Pole position awarded by qualifying time. Italics – Pole position earned by points standings or practice time. * – Most laps led. ** – All laps led.)

Carolina Pro Late Model Series results
Year	Team	No.	Make	1	2	3	4	5	6	7	8	9	10	11	12	CPLMSC	Pts	Ref
2020	E33 Motorsports	51	Ford	DIL; 18	OCS	HCY	HCY	HCY	HCY	HCY	HCY	FLC; 13				23rd	N/A	
2021	E33 Motorsports	51	Ford	HCY	HCY	OCS	FLC	HCY	CCS	FCS	DIL	HCY	OCS	HCY	**SNM**; 5*	51st	N/A	
