= 2019 Brickyard 400 =

2019 Big Machine Vodka 400 at the Brickyard
Race details
- Race 26 of 36 in the 2019 Monster Energy NASCAR Cup Series
- The 2019 Brickyard 400 program cover, featuring the winners of last year's races at Indianapolis- Brady Bacon (BC 39), Justin Allgaier (Indiana 250), and Brad Keselowski (Brickyard 400).
- Date: September 8, 2019
- Location: Indianapolis Motor Speedway in Speedway, Indiana
- Course: Permanent racing facility
- Course length: 2.5 miles (4 km)
- Distance: 160 laps, 400 mi (640 km)
- Average speed: 119.443 miles per hour (192.225 km/h)

Pole position
| Driver | Kevin Harvick | Stewart-Haas Racing |
- Time: 48.448

Most laps led
| Driver | Kevin Harvick | Stewart-Haas Racing |
- Laps: 118

Winner
| No. 4 | Kevin Harvick | Stewart-Haas Racing |

Television in the United States
- Network: NBC
- Announcers: Rick Allen, Steve Letarte (booth), Mike Bagley (Turn 2), Dale Earnhardt Jr. (Turn 3), Jeff Burton (Turn 4)
- Nielsen ratings: 2.969 million

Radio in the United States
- Radio: IndyCar Radio Network
- Booth announcers: Doug Rice, Pat Patterson and Jeff Hammond
- Turn announcers: Mark Jaynes (1), Nick Yeoman (2), Jake Query (3) and Chris Denari (4)

The 2019 Brickyard 400, branded as Big Machine Vodka 400 at the Brickyard, was a Monster Energy NASCAR Cup Series race held on September 8, 2019, at Indianapolis Motor Speedway in Speedway, Indiana. It was the 26th running of the Brickyard 400. Contested over 160 laps on the 2.5-mile (4.0 km) speedway, it was the 26th race of the 2019 Monster Energy NASCAR Cup Series season, and the final race of the regular season before the playoffs.

== Report ==
=== Background ===
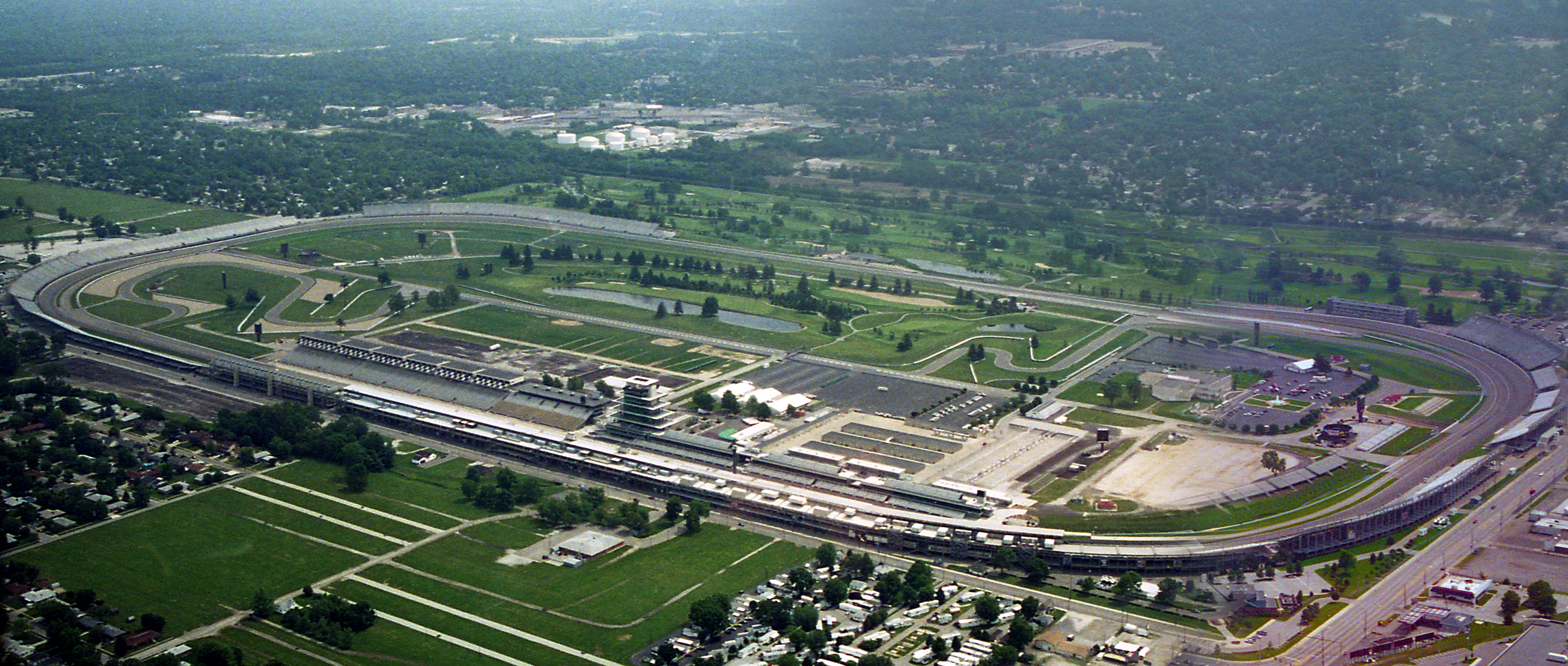
Indianapolis Motor Speedway, the track where the race was held.

The layout of Indianapolis Motor Speedway, the venue where the race was held.

The Indianapolis Motor Speedway, located in Speedway, Indiana, (an enclave suburb of Indianapolis) in the United States, is the home of the Indianapolis 500 and the Brickyard 400. It is located on the corner of 16th Street and Georgetown Road, approximately six miles (10 km) west of Downtown Indianapolis.

Constructed in 1909, it is the original speedway, the first racing facility so named. It has a permanent seating capacity estimated at 235,000 with infield seating raising capacity to an approximate 400,000. It is the highest-capacity sports venue in the world.

Considered relatively flat by American standards, the track is a 2.5-mile (4.0 km), nearly rectangular oval with dimensions that have remained essentially unchanged since its inception: four 0.25-mile (0.40 km) turns, two 0.625-mile-long (1.006 km) straightaways between the fourth and first turns and the second and third turns, and two .125-mile (0.201 km) short straightaways – termed "short chutes" – between the first and second, and third and fourth turns.

==== Entry list ====
- (i) denotes driver who are ineligible for series driver points.
- (R) denotes rookie driver.
- (W) denotes past winner of event.

| No. | Driver | Team | Manufacturer |
|---|---|---|---|
| 00 | Landon Cassill (i) | StarCom Racing | Chevrolet |
| 1 | Kurt Busch | Chip Ganassi Racing | Chevrolet |
| 2 | Brad Keselowski (W) | Team Penske | Ford |
| 3 | Austin Dillon | Richard Childress Racing | Chevrolet |
| 4 | Kevin Harvick (W) | Stewart-Haas Racing | Ford |
| 6 | Ryan Newman (W) | Roush Fenway Racing | Ford |
| 8 | Daniel Hemric (R) | Richard Childress Racing | Chevrolet |
| 9 | Chase Elliott | Hendrick Motorsports | Chevrolet |
| 10 | Aric Almirola | Stewart-Haas Racing | Ford |
| 11 | Denny Hamlin | Joe Gibbs Racing | Toyota |
| 12 | Ryan Blaney | Team Penske | Ford |
| 13 | Ty Dillon | Germain Racing | Chevrolet |
| 14 | Clint Bowyer | Stewart-Haas Racing | Ford |
| 15 | Ross Chastain (i) | Premium Motorsports | Chevrolet |
| 17 | Ricky Stenhouse Jr. | Roush Fenway Racing | Ford |
| 18 | Kyle Busch (W) | Joe Gibbs Racing | Toyota |
| 19 | Martin Truex Jr. | Joe Gibbs Racing | Toyota |
| 20 | Erik Jones | Joe Gibbs Racing | Toyota |
| 21 | Paul Menard (W) | Wood Brothers Racing | Ford |
| 22 | Joey Logano | Team Penske | Ford |
| 24 | William Byron | Hendrick Motorsports | Chevrolet |
| 27 | Ryan Sieg (i) | Premium Motorsports | Chevrolet |
| 32 | Corey LaJoie | Go Fas Racing | Ford |
| 34 | Michael McDowell | Front Row Motorsports | Ford |
| 36 | Matt Tifft (R) | Front Row Motorsports | Ford |
| 37 | Chris Buescher | JTG Daugherty Racing | Chevrolet |
| 38 | David Ragan | Front Row Motorsports | Ford |
| 41 | Daniel Suárez | Stewart-Haas Racing | Ford |
| 42 | Kyle Larson | Chip Ganassi Racing | Chevrolet |
| 43 | Bubba Wallace | Richard Petty Motorsports | Chevrolet |
| 47 | Ryan Preece (R) | JTG Daugherty Racing | Chevrolet |
| 48 | Jimmie Johnson (W) | Hendrick Motorsports | Chevrolet |
| 51 | B. J. McLeod (i) | Petty Ware Racing | Ford |
| 52 | Garrett Smithley (i) | Rick Ware Racing | Ford |
| 53 | Josh Bilicki (i) | Rick Ware Racing | Ford |
| 54 | J. J. Yeley (i) | Rick Ware Racing | Chevrolet |
| 77 | Reed Sorenson | Spire Motorsports | Chevrolet |
| 88 | Alex Bowman | Hendrick Motorsports | Chevrolet |
| 95 | Matt DiBenedetto | Leavine Family Racing | Toyota |
| 96 | Parker Kligerman (i) | Gaunt Brothers Racing | Toyota |
Official entry list

== Practice ==
=== First practice ===
Kyle Larson was the fastest in the first practice session with a time of 48.642 seconds and a speed of 185.025 mph (297.769 km/h).

| Pos | No. | Driver | Team | Manufacturer | Time | Speed |
|---|---|---|---|---|---|---|
| 1 | 42 | Kyle Larson | Chip Ganassi Racing | Chevrolet | 48.642 | 185.025 |
| 2 | 1 | Kurt Busch | Chip Ganassi Racing | Chevrolet | 48.711 | 184.763 |
| 3 | 2 | Brad Keselowski | Team Penske | Ford | 48.754 | 184.600 |
Official first practice results

=== Final practice ===
Paul Menard was the fastest in the final practice session with a time of 48.628 seconds and a speed of 185.079 mph (297.856 km/h).

| Pos | No. | Driver | Team | Manufacturer | Time | Speed |
|---|---|---|---|---|---|---|
| 1 | 21 | Paul Menard | Wood Brothers Racing | Ford | 48.628 | 185.079 |
| 2 | 17 | Ricky Stenhouse Jr. | Roush Fenway Racing | Ford | 48.873 | 184.151 |
| 3 | 20 | Erik Jones | Joe Gibbs Racing | Toyota | 49.033 | 183.550 |
Official final practice results

== Qualifying ==
Kevin Harvick scored the pole for the race with a time of 48.448 and a speed of 185.766 mph (298.961 km/h).

=== Qualifying results ===
| Pos | No. | Driver | Team | Manufacturer | Time |
|---|---|---|---|---|---|
| 1 | 4 | Kevin Harvick | Stewart-Haas Racing | Ford | 48.448 |
| 2 | 21 | Paul Menard | Wood Brothers Racing | Ford | 48.459 |
| 3 | 14 | Clint Bowyer | Stewart-Haas Racing | Ford | 48.576 |
| 4 | 22 | Joey Logano | Team Penske | Ford | 48.598 |
| 5 | 48 | Jimmie Johnson | Hendrick Motorsports | Chevrolet | 48.601 |
| 6 | 2 | Brad Keselowski | Team Penske | Ford | 48.628 |
| 7 | 18 | Kyle Busch | Joe Gibbs Racing | Toyota | 48.707 |
| 8 | 1 | Kurt Busch | Chip Ganassi Racing | Chevrolet | 48.723 |
| 9 | 12 | Ryan Blaney | Team Penske | Ford | 48.733 |
| 10 | 10 | Aric Almirola | Stewart-Haas Racing | Ford | 48.750 |
| 11 | 8 | Daniel Hemric (R) | Richard Childress Racing | Chevrolet | 48.751 |
| 12 | 17 | Ricky Stenhouse Jr. | Roush Fenway Racing | Ford | 48.799 |
| 13 | 88 | Alex Bowman | Hendrick Motorsports | Chevrolet | 48.828 |
| 14 | 20 | Erik Jones | Joe Gibbs Racing | Toyota | 48.880 |
| 15 | 43 | Bubba Wallace | Richard Petty Motorsports | Chevrolet | 48.905 |
| 16 | 37 | Chris Buescher | JTG Daugherty Racing | Chevrolet | 48.929 |
| 17 | 38 | David Ragan | Front Row Motorsports | Ford | 48.932 |
| 18 | 3 | Austin Dillon | Richard Childress Racing | Chevrolet | 48.973 |
| 19 | 42 | Kyle Larson | Chip Ganassi Racing | Chevrolet | 48.974 |
| 20 | 41 | Daniel Suárez | Stewart-Haas Racing | Ford | 49.008 |
| 21 | 34 | Michael McDowell | Front Row Motorsports | Ford | 49.044 |
| 22 | 6 | Ryan Newman | Roush Fenway Racing | Ford | 49.107 |
| 23 | 47 | Ryan Preece (R) | JTG Daugherty Racing | Chevrolet | 49.170 |
| 24 | 9 | Chase Elliott | Hendrick Motorsports | Chevrolet | 49.198 |
| 25 | 13 | Ty Dillon | Germain Racing | Chevrolet | 49.217 |
| 26 | 95 | Matt DiBenedetto | Leavine Family Racing | Toyota | 49.229 |
| 27 | 19 | Martin Truex Jr. | Joe Gibbs Racing | Toyota | 49.260 |
| 28 | 36 | Matt Tifft (R) | Front Row Motorsports | Ford | 49.415 |
| 29 | 24 | William Byron | Hendrick Motorsports | Chevrolet | 49.439 |
| 30 | 32 | Corey LaJoie | Go Fas Racing | Ford | 49.565 |
| 31 | 00 | Landon Cassill (i) | StarCom Racing | Chevrolet | 49.618 |
| 32 | 96 | Parker Kligerman (i) | Gaunt Brothers Racing | Toyota | 49.697 |
| 33 | 11 | Denny Hamlin | Joe Gibbs Racing | Toyota | 49.826 |
| 34 | 15 | Ross Chastain (i) | Premium Motorsports | Chevrolet | 50.174 |
| 35 | 51 | B. J. McLeod (i) | Petty Ware Racing | Ford | 50.491 |
| 36 | 27 | Ryan Sieg (i) | Premium Motorsports | Chevrolet | 50.884 |
| 37 | 77 | Reed Sorenson | Spire Motorsports | Chevrolet | 50.954 |
| 38 | 52 | Garrett Smithley (i) | Rick Ware Racing | Ford | 51.134 |
| 39 | 53 | Josh Bilicki (i) | Rick Ware Racing | Ford | 51.429 |
| 40 | 54 | J. J. Yeley (i) | Rick Ware Racing | Chevrolet | 51.550 |
Official qualifying results

== Race ==
=== Stage results ===
Stage One Laps: 50

| Pos | No | Driver | Team | Manufacturer | Points |
|---|---|---|---|---|---|
| 1 | 22 | Joey Logano | Team Penske | Ford | 10 |
| 2 | 42 | Kyle Larson | Chip Ganassi Racing | Chevrolet | 9 |
| 3 | 4 | Kevin Harvick | Stewart-Haas Racing | Ford | 8 |
| 4 | 12 | Ryan Blaney | Team Penske | Ford | 7 |
| 5 | 6 | Ryan Newman | Roush Fenway Racing | Ford | 6 |
| 6 | 48 | Jimmie Johnson | Hendrick Motorsports | Chevrolet | 5 |
| 7 | 18 | Kyle Busch | Joe Gibbs Racing | Toyota | 4 |
| 8 | 11 | Denny Hamlin | Joe Gibbs Racing | Toyota | 3 |
| 9 | 88 | Alex Bowman | Hendrick Motorsports | Chevrolet | 2 |
| 10 | 37 | Chris Buescher | JTG Daugherty Racing | Chevrolet | 1 |
Official stage one results

Stage Two Laps: 50

| Pos | No | Driver | Team | Manufacturer | Points |
|---|---|---|---|---|---|
| 1 | 4 | Kevin Harvick | Stewart-Haas Racing | Ford | 10 |
| 2 | 42 | Kyle Larson | Chip Ganassi Racing | Chevrolet | 9 |
| 3 | 12 | Ryan Blaney | Team Penske | Ford | 8 |
| 4 | 22 | Joey Logano | Team Penske | Ford | 7 |
| 5 | 14 | Clint Bowyer | Stewart-Haas Racing | Ford | 6 |
| 6 | 41 | Daniel Suárez | Stewart-Haas Racing | Ford | 5 |
| 7 | 1 | Kurt Busch | Chip Ganassi Racing | Chevrolet | 4 |
| 8 | 48 | Jimmie Johnson | Hendrick Motorsports | Chevrolet | 3 |
| 9 | 24 | William Byron | Hendrick Motorsports | Chevrolet | 2 |
| 10 | 10 | Aric Almirola | Stewart-Haas Racing | Ford | 1 |
Official stage two results

=== Final stage results ===
Stage Three Laps: 60

| Pos | Grid | No | Driver | Team | Manufacturer | Laps | Points |
|---|---|---|---|---|---|---|---|
| 1 | 1 | 4 | Kevin Harvick | Stewart-Haas Racing | Ford | 160 | 58 |
| 2 | 4 | 22 | Joey Logano | Team Penske | Ford | 160 | 52 |
| 3 | 15 | 43 | Bubba Wallace | Richard Petty Motorsports | Chevrolet | 160 | 34 |
| 4 | 29 | 24 | William Byron | Hendrick Motorsports | Chevrolet | 160 | 35 |
| 5 | 3 | 14 | Clint Bowyer | Stewart-Haas Racing | Ford | 160 | 38 |
| 6 | 33 | 11 | Denny Hamlin | Joe Gibbs Racing | Toyota | 160 | 34 |
| 7 | 9 | 12 | Ryan Blaney | Team Penske | Ford | 160 | 45 |
| 8 | 22 | 6 | Ryan Newman | Roush Fenway Racing | Ford | 160 | 35 |
| 9 | 24 | 9 | Chase Elliott | Hendrick Motorsports | Chevrolet | 160 | 28 |
| 10 | 2 | 21 | Paul Menard | Wood Brothers Racing | Ford | 160 | 27 |
| 11 | 20 | 41 | Daniel Suárez | Stewart-Haas Racing | Ford | 160 | 31 |
| 12 | 18 | 3 | Austin Dillon | Richard Childress Racing | Chevrolet | 160 | 25 |
| 13 | 25 | 13 | Ty Dillon | Germain Racing | Chevrolet | 160 | 24 |
| 14 | 10 | 10 | Aric Almirola | Stewart-Haas Racing | Ford | 160 | 24 |
| 15 | 16 | 37 | Chris Buescher | JTG Daugherty Racing | Chevrolet | 160 | 23 |
| 16 | 23 | 47 | Ryan Preece (R) | JTG Daugherty Racing | Chevrolet | 160 | 21 |
| 17 | 21 | 34 | Michael McDowell | Front Row Motorsports | Ford | 160 | 20 |
| 18 | 26 | 95 | Matt DiBenedetto | Leavine Family Racing | Toyota | 160 | 19 |
| 19 | 30 | 32 | Corey LaJoie | Go Fas Racing | Ford | 160 | 18 |
| 20 | 17 | 38 | David Ragan | Front Row Motorsports | Ford | 160 | 17 |
| 21 | 13 | 88 | Alex Bowman | Hendrick Motorsports | Chevrolet | 160 | 18 |
| 22 | 34 | 15 | Ross Chastain (i) | Premium Motorsports | Chevrolet | 160 | 0 |
| 23 | 37 | 77 | Reed Sorenson | Spire Motorsports | Chevrolet | 160 | 14 |
| 24 | 36 | 27 | Ryan Sieg (i) | Premium Motorsports | Chevrolet | 157 | 0 |
| 25 | 35 | 51 | B. J. McLeod (i) | Petty Ware Racing | Ford | 157 | 0 |
| 26 | 40 | 54 | J. J. Yeley (i) | Rick Ware Racing | Chevrolet | 157 | 0 |
| 27 | 27 | 19 | Martin Truex Jr. | Joe Gibbs Racing | Toyota | 156 | 10 |
| 28 | 38 | 52 | Garrett Smithley (i) | Rick Ware Racing | Ford | 156 | 0 |
| 29 | 39 | 53 | Josh Bilicki (i) | Rick Ware Racing | Ford | 155 | 0 |
| 30 | 8 | 1 | Kurt Busch | Chip Ganassi Racing | Chevrolet | 155 | 11 |
| 31 | 12 | 17 | Ricky Stenhouse Jr. | Roush Fenway Racing | Ford | 153 | 6 |
| 32 | 28 | 36 | Matt Tifft (R) | Front Row Motorsports | Ford | 147 | 5 |
| 33 | 19 | 42 | Kyle Larson | Chip Ganassi Racing | Chevrolet | 129 | 22 |
| 34 | 11 | 8 | Daniel Hemric (R) | Richard Childress Racing | Chevrolet | 109 | 3 |
| 35 | 5 | 48 | Jimmie Johnson | Hendrick Motorsports | Chevrolet | 105 | 10 |
| 36 | 32 | 96 | Parker Kligerman (i) | Gaunt Brothers Racing | Toyota | 104 | 0 |
| 37 | 7 | 18 | Kyle Busch | Joe Gibbs Racing | Toyota | 87 | 5 |
| 38 | 6 | 2 | Brad Keselowski | Team Penske | Ford | 48 | 1 |
| 39 | 14 | 20 | Erik Jones | Joe Gibbs Racing | Toyota | 48 | 1 |
| 40 | 31 | 00 | Landon Cassill (i) | StarCom Racing | Chevrolet | 40 | 0 |
Official race results

=== Race statistics ===
- Lead changes: 13 among 8 different drivers
- Cautions/Laps: 9 for 48
- Red flags: 1 for 12 minutes and 36 seconds
- Time of race: 3 hours, 20 minutes and 6 seconds
- Average speed: 119.443 miles per hour (192.225 km/h)

== Media ==
=== Television ===
NBC Sports covered the race on the television side. The broadcast was produced similarly to NBC's Watkins Glen International race broadcasts. Rick Allen and Steve Letarte had the call in the booth for the race. Motor Racing Network broadcaster Mike Bagley called from Turn 2, Dale Earnhardt Jr. called from Turn 3, and Jeff Burton called from Turn 4. Dave Burns, Marty Snider and Kelli Stavast reported from pit lane during the race.

NBCSN
| Booth announcers | Turn Announcers | Pit reporters |
|---|---|---|
| Lap-by-lap: Rick Allen; Color-commentator: Steve Letarte | Turn 2 Announcer: Mike Bagley; Turn 3 Announcer: Dale Earnhardt Jr. Turn 4 Announcer: Jeff Burton | Dave Burns; Marty Snider; Kelli Stavast |

=== Radio ===
Indianapolis Motor Speedway Radio Network and the Performance Racing Network jointly co-produced the radio broadcast for the race, which was simulcast on Sirius XM NASCAR Radio, and aired on IMS or PRN stations, depending on contractual obligations. The lead announcers and two pit reporters were PRN staff, while the turns and two pit reporters were from IMS.

PRN/IMS Radio
| Booth announcers | Turn announcers | Pit reporters |
|---|---|---|
| Lead announcer: Doug Rice; Announcer: Pat Patterson; Announcer: Jeff Hammond; Historian: Donald Davidson | Turn 1: Mark Jaynes; Turn 2: Nick Yeoman; Turn 3: Jake Query; Turn 4: Chris Denari | Brad Gillie; Brett McMillan; Ryan Myrehn; Michael Young |

== Standings after the race ==
Drivers' Championship standings after Playoffs reset

| | Pos | Driver | Points |
|---|---|---|---|
| | 1 | Kyle Busch | 2,045 |
| 2 | 2 | Denny Hamlin | 2,030 (–15) |
| 2 | 3 | Martin Truex Jr. | 2,029 (–16) |
| 2 | 4 | Joey Logano | 2,028 (–17) |
| 1 | 5 | Kevin Harvick | 2,028 (–17) |
| | 6 | Brad Keselowski | 2,024 (–21) |
| 1 | 7 | Chase Elliott | 2,018 (–27) |
| 1 | 8 | Kurt Busch | 2,011 (–34) |
| | 9 | Kyle Larson | 2,005 (–40) |
| 1 | 10 | Alex Bowman | 2,005 (–40) |
| 1 | 11 | Erik Jones | 2,005 (–40) |
| 2 | 12 | Ryan Blaney | 2,004 (–41) |
| | 13 | William Byron | 2,001 (–44) |
| | 14 | Aric Almirola | 2,001 (–44) |
| | 15 | Clint Bowyer | 2,000 (–45) |
| 1 | 16 | Ryan Newman | 2,000 (–45) |
Official driver's standings

Manufacturers' Championship standings

| Pos | Manufacturer | Points |
|---|---|---|
| 1 | Toyota | 948 |
| 2 | Ford | 923 (–25) |
| 3 | Chevrolet | 883 (–65) |

- Note: Only the first 16 positions are included for the driver standings.

| Previous race: 2019 Bojangles' Southern 500 | Monster Energy NASCAR Cup Series; 2019 season | Next race: 2019 South Point 400 |
