= 2019 Bank of America Roval 400 =

2019 Monster Energy NASCAR Cup Series race

Race details
- Race 29 of 36 in the 2019 Monster Energy NASCAR Cup Series
- The 2019 Bank of America Roval 400 program cover, featuring the finish of last year's race between Jimmie Johnson, Martin Truex Jr., and last year's winner Ryan Blaney.
- Date: September 29, 2019
- Location: Charlotte Motor Speedway in Concord, North Carolina
- Course: Permanent racing facility
- Course length: 2.28 miles (3.67 km)
- Distance: 109 laps, 248.52 mi (400 km)
- Average speed: 75.499 miles per hour (121.504 km/h)

Pole position
Driver	William Byron	Hendrick Motorsports
- Time: 80.932

Most laps led
Driver	Chase Elliott	Hendrick Motorsports
- Laps: 35

Winner
No. 9	Chase Elliott	Hendrick Motorsports

Television in the United States
- Network: NBC
- Announcers: Rick Allen, Jeff Burton, Steve Letarte and Dale Earnhardt Jr.
- Nielsen ratings: 3.024 million

Radio in the United States
- Radio: PRN
- Booth announcers: Doug Rice, Mark Garrow and Jeff Hammond
- Turn announcers: Nick Yeoman (1, 2 & 3), Mike Jaynes (4, 5 & 6), Doug Turnbull (7, 8 & 9), Pat Patterson (10, 11 & 12) and Rob Albright (13, 14 & 15)

The 2019 Bank of America Roval 400 was a Monster Energy NASCAR Cup Series race that was held on September 29, 2019, at Charlotte Motor Speedway in Concord, North Carolina. Contested over 109 laps on the 2.28-mile (3.67 km) road course, it was the 29th race of the 2019 Monster Energy NASCAR Cup Series season, the third race of the Playoffs, and final race of the Round of 16.

== Report ==
=== Background ===
An aerial view of Charlotte Motor Speedway

Since 2018, deviating from past NASCAR events at Charlotte, the race will utilize a road course configuration of Charlotte Motor Speedway, promoted and trademarked as the "Roval". The course is 2.28 miles (3.67 km) in length and features 17 turns, utilizing the infield road course and portions of the oval track. The race will be contested over a scheduled distance of 109 laps, 400 kilometres (250 mi).

During July 2018 tests on the road course, concerns were raised over drivers "cheating" the backstretch chicane on the course. The chicanes were modified with additional tire barriers and rumble strips in order to encourage drivers to properly drive through them, and NASCAR will enforce drive-through penalties on drivers who illegally "short-cut" parts of the course. The chicanes will not be used during restarts. In the summer of 2019, the bus stop on the backstretch was changed and deepened, becoming a permanent part of the circuit, compared to the previous year where it was improvised.

If a driver fails to legally make the backstretch bus stop, the driver must skip the frontstretch chicane and make a complete stop by the dotted line on the exit before being allowed to continue. A driver who misses the frontstretch chicane must stop before the exit.

==== Entry list ====
- (i) denotes driver who are ineligible for series driver points.
- (R) denotes rookie driver.

No.	Driver	Team	Manufacturer
00	Landon Cassill (i)	StarCom Racing	Chevrolet
1	Kurt Busch	Chip Ganassi Racing	Chevrolet
2	Brad Keselowski	Team Penske	Ford
3	Austin Dillon	Richard Childress Racing	Chevrolet
4	Kevin Harvick	Stewart-Haas Racing	Ford
6	Ryan Newman	Roush Fenway Racing	Ford
8	Daniel Hemric (R)	Richard Childress Racing	Chevrolet
9	Chase Elliott	Hendrick Motorsports	Chevrolet
10	Aric Almirola	Stewart-Haas Racing	Ford
11	Denny Hamlin	Joe Gibbs Racing	Toyota
12	Ryan Blaney	Team Penske	Ford
13	Ty Dillon	Germain Racing	Chevrolet
14	Clint Bowyer	Stewart-Haas Racing	Ford
15	Ross Chastain (i)	Premium Motorsports	Chevrolet
17	Ricky Stenhouse Jr.	Roush Fenway Racing	Ford
18	Kyle Busch	Joe Gibbs Racing	Toyota
19	Martin Truex Jr.	Joe Gibbs Racing	Toyota
20	Erik Jones	Joe Gibbs Racing	Toyota
21	Paul Menard	Wood Brothers Racing	Ford
22	Joey Logano	Team Penske	Ford
24	William Byron	Hendrick Motorsports	Chevrolet
27	Joe Nemechek (i)	Premium Motorsports	Chevrolet
32	Corey LaJoie	Go Fas Racing	Ford
34	Michael McDowell	Front Row Motorsports	Ford
36	Matt Tifft (R)	Front Row Motorsports	Ford
37	Chris Buescher	JTG Daugherty Racing	Chevrolet
38	David Ragan	Front Row Motorsports	Ford
41	Daniel Suárez	Stewart-Haas Racing	Ford
42	Kyle Larson	Chip Ganassi Racing	Chevrolet
43	Bubba Wallace	Richard Petty Motorsports	Chevrolet
47	Ryan Preece (R)	JTG Daugherty Racing	Chevrolet
48	Jimmie Johnson	Hendrick Motorsports	Chevrolet
51	Cody Ware (i)	Petty Ware Racing	Chevrolet
52	Garrett Smithley (i)	Rick Ware Racing	Ford
53	Josh Bilicki (i)	Rick Ware Racing	Chevrolet
66	Timmy Hill (i)	MBM Motorsports	Toyota
77	Reed Sorenson	Spire Motorsports	Chevrolet
88	Alex Bowman	Hendrick Motorsports	Chevrolet
95	Matt DiBenedetto	Leavine Family Racing	Toyota
96	Parker Kligerman (i)	Gaunt Brothers Racing	Toyota
Official entry list

== First practice ==
Jimmie Johnson was the fastest in the first practice session with a time of 80.968 seconds and a speed of 103.152 mph (166.007 km/h). Michael McDowell was replaced by Austin Cindric for the session while he was treating a kidney stone, but returned for qualifying later in the day.

Pos	No.	Driver	Team	Manufacturer	Time	Speed
1	48	Jimmie Johnson	Hendrick Motorsports	Chevrolet	80.968	103.152
2	42	Kyle Larson	Chip Ganassi Racing	Chevrolet	81.018	103.088
3	24	William Byron	Hendrick Motorsports	Chevrolet	81.520	102.453
Official first practice results

== Qualifying ==
William Byron scored the pole for the race with a time of 80.932 and a speed of 103.198 mph (166.081 km/h).

=== Qualifying results ===
Pos	No.	Driver	Team	Manufacturer	R1	R2
1	24	William Byron	Hendrick Motorsports	Chevrolet	80.901	80.932
2	88	Alex Bowman	Hendrick Motorsports	Chevrolet	81.570	81.026
3	22	Joey Logano	Team Penske	Ford	81.712	81.058
4	48	Jimmie Johnson	Hendrick Motorsports	Chevrolet	81.394	81.172
5	14	Clint Bowyer	Stewart-Haas Racing	Ford	81.426	81.215
6	4	Kevin Harvick	Stewart-Haas Racing	Ford	81.721	81.576
7	42	Kyle Larson	Chip Ganassi Racing	Chevrolet	80.950	81.595
8	19	Martin Truex Jr.	Joe Gibbs Racing	Toyota	81.740	82.068
9	12	Ryan Blaney	Team Penske	Ford	81.761	82.094
10	21	Paul Menard	Wood Brothers Racing	Ford	81.823	82.215
11	2	Brad Keselowski	Team Penske	Ford	81.495	82.297
12	37	Chris Buescher	JTG Daugherty Racing	Chevrolet	81.686	82.327
13	41	Daniel Suárez	Stewart-Haas Racing	Ford	81.920	—
14	47	Ryan Preece (R)	JTG Daugherty Racing	Chevrolet	81.928	—
15	20	Erik Jones	Joe Gibbs Racing	Toyota	81.973	—
16	10	Aric Almirola	Stewart-Haas Racing	Ford	81.978	—
17	18	Kyle Busch	Joe Gibbs Racing	Toyota	81.986	—
18	95	Matt DiBenedetto	Leavine Family Racing	Toyota	81.993	—
19	9	Chase Elliott	Hendrick Motorsports	Chevrolet	82.098	—
20	8	Daniel Hemric (R)	Richard Childress Racing	Chevrolet	82.127	—
21	17	Ricky Stenhouse Jr.	Roush Fenway Racing	Ford	82.232	—
22	34	Michael McDowell	Front Row Motorsports	Ford	82.252	—
23	1	Kurt Busch	Chip Ganassi Racing	Chevrolet	82.317	—
24	6	Ryan Newman	Roush Fenway Racing	Ford	82.572	—
25	43	Bubba Wallace	Richard Petty Motorsports	Chevrolet	82.582	—
26	32	Corey LaJoie	Go Fas Racing	Ford	82.630	—
27	38	David Ragan	Front Row Motorsports	Ford	83.088	—
28	11	Denny Hamlin	Joe Gibbs Racing	Toyota	83.099	—
29	13	Ty Dillon	Germain Racing	Chevrolet	83.121	—
30	3	Austin Dillon	Richard Childress Racing	Chevrolet	83.232	—
31	51	Cody Ware (i)	Petty Ware Racing	Chevrolet	84.220	—
32	00	Landon Cassill (i)	StarCom Racing	Chevrolet	84.690	—
33	66	Timmy Hill (i)	MBM Motorsports	Toyota	85.315	—
34	53	Josh Bilicki (i)	Rick Ware Racing	Chevrolet	85.572	—
35	52	Garrett Smithley (i)	Rick Ware Racing	Ford	85.782	—
36	36	Matt Tifft (R)	Front Row Motorsports	Ford	0.000	—
37	15	Ross Chastain (i)	Premium Motorsports	Chevrolet	0.000	—
38	77	Reed Sorenson	Spire Motorsports	Toyota	0.000	—
39	27	Joe Nemechek (i)	Premium Motorsports	Chevrolet	0.000	—
40	96	Parker Kligerman (i)	Gaunt Brothers Racing	Toyota	0.000	—
Official qualifying results

== Practice (post-qualifying) ==
=== Second practice ===
Ryan Blaney was the fastest in the second practice session with a time of 81.977 seconds and a speed of 101.882 mph (163.963 km/h).

Pos	No.	Driver	Team	Manufacturer	Time	Speed
1	12	Ryan Blaney	Team Penske	Ford	81.977	101.882
2	47	Ryan Preece (R)	JTG Daugherty Racing	Chevrolet	82.330	101.445
3	22	Joey Logano	Team Penske	Ford	82.377	101.388
Official second practice results

=== Final practice ===
Chase Elliott was the fastest in the final practice session with a time of 81.801 seconds and a speed of 102.101 mph (164.316 km/h).

Pos	No.	Driver	Team	Manufacturer	Time	Speed
1	9	Chase Elliott	Hendrick Motorsports	Chevrolet	81.801	102.101
2	19	Martin Truex Jr.	Joe Gibbs Racing	Toyota	81.875	102.009
3	2	Brad Keselowski	Team Penske	Ford	81.970	101.891
Official final practice results

== Race ==
=== Stage results ===
Stage One Laps: 25

Pos	No	Driver	Team	Manufacturer	Points
1	42	Kyle Larson	Chip Ganassi Racing	Chevrolet	10
2	24	William Byron	Hendrick Motorsports	Chevrolet	9
3	14	Clint Bowyer	Stewart-Haas Racing	Ford	8
4	22	Joey Logano	Team Penske	Ford	7
5	12	Ryan Blaney	Team Penske	Ford	6
6	2	Brad Keselowski	Team Penske	Ford	5
7	10	Aric Almirola	Stewart-Haas Racing	Ford	4
8	4	Kevin Harvick	Stewart-Haas Racing	Ford	3
9	9	Chase Elliott	Hendrick Motorsports	Chevrolet	2
10	41	Daniel Suárez	Stewart-Haas Racing	Ford	1
Official stage one results

Stage Two Laps: 25

Pos	No	Driver	Team	Manufacturer	Points
1	9	Chase Elliott	Hendrick Motorsports	Chevrolet	10
2	2	Brad Keselowski	Team Penske	Ford	9
3	14	Clint Bowyer	Stewart-Haas Racing	Ford	8
4	48	Jimmie Johnson	Hendrick Motorsports	Chevrolet	7
5	4	Kevin Harvick	Stewart-Haas Racing	Ford	6
6	34	Michael McDowell	Front Row Motorsports	Ford	5
7	19	Martin Truex Jr.	Joe Gibbs Racing	Toyota	4
8	41	Daniel Suárez	Stewart-Haas Racing	Ford	3
9	21	Paul Menard	Wood Brothers Racing	Ford	2
10	24	William Byron	Hendrick Motorsports	Chevrolet	1
Official stage two results

=== Final stage results ===
Stage Three Laps: 59

Pos	Grid	No	Driver	Team	Manufacturer	Laps	Points
1	19	9	Chase Elliott	Hendrick Motorsports	Chevrolet	109	52
2	2	88	Alex Bowman	Hendrick Motorsports	Chevrolet	109	35
3	6	4	Kevin Harvick	Stewart-Haas Racing	Ford	109	43
4	5	14	Clint Bowyer	Stewart-Haas Racing	Ford	109	49
5	11	2	Brad Keselowski	Team Penske	Ford	109	46
6	1	24	William Byron	Hendrick Motorsports	Chevrolet	109	41
7	8	19	Martin Truex Jr.	Joe Gibbs Racing	Toyota	109	34
8	9	12	Ryan Blaney	Team Penske	Ford	109	34
9	4	48	Jimmie Johnson	Hendrick Motorsports	Chevrolet	109	35
10	3	22	Joey Logano	Team Penske	Ford	109	34
11	18	95	Matt DiBenedetto	Leavine Family Racing	Toyota	109	26
12	22	34	Michael McDowell	Front Row Motorsports	Ford	109	30
13	7	42	Kyle Larson	Chip Ganassi Racing	Chevrolet	109	34
14	16	10	Aric Almirola	Stewart-Haas Racing	Ford	109	27
15	29	13	Ty Dillon	Germain Racing	Chevrolet	109	22
16	10	21	Paul Menard	Wood Brothers Racing	Ford	109	23
17	21	17	Ricky Stenhouse Jr.	Roush Fenway Racing	Ford	109	20
18	12	37	Chris Buescher	JTG Daugherty Racing	Chevrolet	109	19
19	28	11	Denny Hamlin	Joe Gibbs Racing	Toyota	109	18
20	23	1	Kurt Busch	Chip Ganassi Racing	Chevrolet	109	17
21	14	47	Ryan Preece (R)	JTG Daugherty Racing	Chevrolet	109	16
22	37	15	Ross Chastain (i)	Premium Motorsports	Chevrolet	109	0
23	30	3	Austin Dillon	Richard Childress Racing	Chevrolet	109	14
24	25	43	Bubba Wallace	Richard Petty Motorsports	Chevrolet	109	13
25	36	36	Matt Tifft (R)	Front Row Motorsports	Ford	109	12
26	40	96	Parker Kligerman (i)	Gaunt Brothers Racing	Toyota	109	0
27	26	32	Corey LaJoie	Go Fas Racing	Ford	109	10
28	32	00	Landon Cassill (i)	StarCom Racing	Chevrolet	109	0
29	31	51	J. J. Yeley (i)	Petty Ware Racing	Chevrolet	109	0
30	33	66	Timmy Hill (i)	MBM Motorsports	Toyota	109	0
31	39	27	Joe Nemechek (i)	Premium Motorsports	Chevrolet	109	0
32	24	6	Ryan Newman	Roush Fenway Racing	Ford	109	5
33	20	8	Daniel Hemric (R)	Richard Childress Racing	Chevrolet	109	4
34	13	41	Daniel Suárez	Stewart-Haas Racing	Ford	108	7
35	27	38	David Ragan	Front Row Motorsports	Ford	108	2
36	35	52	Garrett Smithley (i)	Rick Ware Racing	Ford	100	0
37	17	18	Kyle Busch	Joe Gibbs Racing	Toyota	99	1
38	34	53	Josh Bilicki (i)	Rick Ware Racing	Chevrolet	83	0
39	38	77	Reed Sorenson	Spire Motorsports	Chevrolet	66	1
40	15	20	Erik Jones	Joe Gibbs Racing	Toyota	23	1
Official race results

- Cody Ware was supposed to drive No. 51 car in the race but during the Xfinity Series race, the day before, the coolbox of Cody Ware's car didn't work during the race so he felt the heat exhaustion. So J. J. Yeley was called to replace Ware in the No. 51 car in the race.

=== Race statistics ===
- Lead changes: 13 among 9 different drivers
- Cautions/Laps: 10 for 23
- Red flags: 1 for 8 minutes and 22 seconds
- Time of race: 3 hours, 20 minutes and 58 seconds
- Average speed: 75.499 miles per hour (121.504 km/h)

== Media ==
=== Television ===
NBC Sports covered the race on the television side. Rick Allen, Jeff Burton, Steve Letarte and Dale Earnhardt Jr. had the call in the booth for the race. Dave Burns, Marty Snider, and Kelli Stavast reported from pit lane during the race.

NBC
Booth announcers	Pit reporters
Lap-by-lap: Rick Allen; Color-commentator: Jeff Burton; Color-commentator: Steve Letarte; Color-commentator: Dale Earnhardt Jr.	Dave Burns; Marty Snider; Kelli Stavast

=== Radio ===
The Performance Racing Network, with talent and production assistant from the Indianapolis Motor Speedway Radio Network, had the radio call for the race, which was simulcast on Sirius XM NASCAR Radio. Doug Rice, Mark Garrow, and Jeff Hammond called the race from the booth when the field raced down the front straightaway. IMS Radio's Nick Yeoman was assigned the entrance to the road course and into the Bank of America bridge (Turns 1-3). Voice of the Indianapolis 500 Mark Jaynes was assigned the action from the Bank of America bridge to the middle of the infield section. Doug Turnbull called the action exiting in infield into the oval Turn 1 banking (Turns 7-9). Pat Patterson called the action on the backstretch and into the bus stop. Rob Albright was assigned to the oval Turn 3-4 end. (Turns 13-15). Brad Gillie, Brett McMillan, Steve Richards, and Wendy Venturini had the call from the pit area for PRN.

PRN
Booth announcers	Turn announcers	Pit reporters
Lead announcer: Doug Rice; Announcer: Mark Garrow; Announcer: Jeff Hammond	Infield entrance: Nick Yeoman; Middle of Infield: Mark Jaynes; Exit of Infield: Doug Turnbull; Oval 2 to Bus Stop Pat Patterson; Oval 3/4: Rob Albright	Brad Gillie; Brett McMillan; Steve Richards; Wendy Venturini

== Standings after the race ==
	Pos	Driver	Points
2	1	Kyle Busch	3,046
1	2	Martin Truex Jr.	3,041 (–5)
2	3	Denny Hamlin	3,030 (–16)
2	4	Joey Logano	3,029 (–17)
3	5	Kevin Harvick	3,028 (–18)
1	6	Chase Elliott	3,024 (–22)
3	7	Brad Keselowski	3,024 (–22)
	8	Kyle Larson	3,006 (–40)
4	9	Alex Bowman	3,005 (–41)
	10	Ryan Blaney	3,004 (–42)
1	11	William Byron	3,001 (–45)
2	12	Clint Bowyer	3,000 (–46)
2	13	Aric Almirola	2,081 (–965)
5	14	Ryan Newman	2,070 (–976)
	15	Kurt Busch	2,056 (–990)
	16	Erik Jones	2,009 (–1,037)
Official driver's standings

Manufacturers' Championship standings

Pos	Manufacturer	Points
1	Toyota	1,058
2	Ford	1,025 (–33)
3	Chevrolet	987 (–71)

- Note: Only the first 16 positions are included for the driver standings.

Previous race: 2019 Federated Auto Parts 400	Monster Energy NASCAR Cup Series; 2019 season	Next race: 2019 Drydene 400
