= 2019 South Point 400 =

Race details
- Race 27 of 36 in the 2019 Monster Energy NASCAR Cup Series
- 2019 South Point 400 program cover
- Date: September 15, 2019
- Location: Las Vegas Motor Speedway in Las Vegas
- Course: Permanent racing facility
- Course length: 1.5 miles (2.4 km)
- Distance: 267 laps, 400.5 mi (640.8 km)
- Average speed: 142.555 miles per hour (229.420 km/h)

Pole position
Driver	Clint Bowyer	Stewart-Haas Racing
- Time: 30.180

Most laps led
Driver	Joey Logano	Team Penske
- Laps: 105

Winner
No. 19	Martin Truex Jr.	Joe Gibbs Racing

Television in the United States
- Network: NBCSN
- Announcers: Rick Allen, Jeff Burton, Steve Letarte and Dale Earnhardt Jr.
- Nielsen ratings: 2.384 million

Radio in the United States
- Radio: PRN
- Booth announcers: Doug Rice and Mark Garrow
- Turn announcers: Rob Albright (1 & 2) and Pat Patterson (3 & 4)

The 2019 South Point 400 was a Monster Energy NASCAR Cup Series race held on September 15, 2019, at Las Vegas Motor Speedway in Las Vegas. Contested over 267 laps on the 1.5 mi (2.4 km) asphalt intermediate speedway, it was the 27th race of the 2019 Monster Energy NASCAR Cup Series season, first race of the Playoffs, and the first race of the Round of 16.

== Report ==
=== Background ===
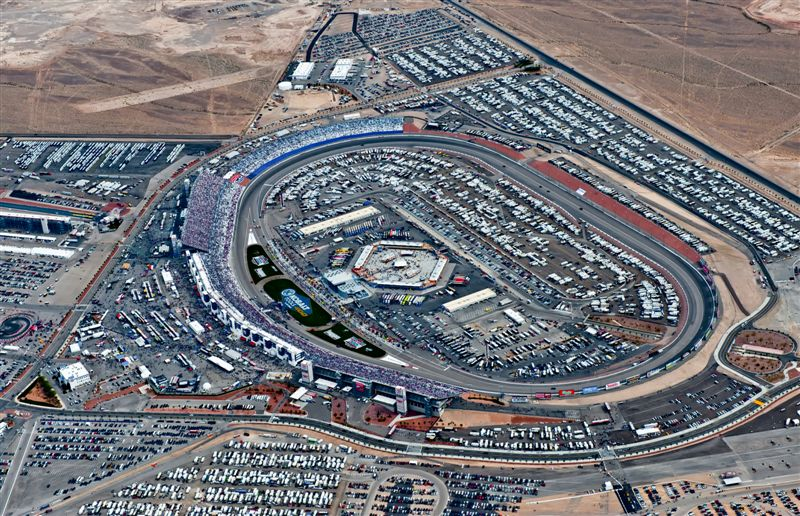
Las Vegas Motor Speedway, the track where the race is held.

Las Vegas Motor Speedway, located in Clark County, Nevada outside the Las Vegas city limits and about 15 miles northeast of the Las Vegas Strip, is a 1,200-acre (490 ha) complex of multiple tracks for motorsports racing. The complex is owned by Speedway Motorsports, Inc., which is headquartered in Charlotte, North Carolina.

==== Entry list ====
- (i) denotes driver who are ineligible for series driver points.
- (R) denotes rookie driver.

No.	Driver	Team	Manufacturer
00	Landon Cassill (i)	StarCom Racing	Chevrolet
1	Kurt Busch	Chip Ganassi Racing	Chevrolet
2	Brad Keselowski	Team Penske	Ford
3	Austin Dillon	Richard Childress Racing	Chevrolet
4	Kevin Harvick	Stewart-Haas Racing	Ford
6	Ryan Newman	Roush Fenway Racing	Ford
8	Daniel Hemric (R)	Richard Childress Racing	Chevrolet
9	Chase Elliott	Hendrick Motorsports	Chevrolet
10	Aric Almirola	Stewart-Haas Racing	Ford
11	Denny Hamlin	Joe Gibbs Racing	Toyota
12	Ryan Blaney	Team Penske	Ford
13	Ty Dillon	Germain Racing	Chevrolet
14	Clint Bowyer	Stewart-Haas Racing	Ford
15	Ross Chastain (i)	Premium Motorsports	Chevrolet
17	Ricky Stenhouse Jr.	Roush Fenway Racing	Ford
18	Kyle Busch	Joe Gibbs Racing	Toyota
19	Martin Truex Jr.	Joe Gibbs Racing	Toyota
20	Erik Jones	Joe Gibbs Racing	Toyota
21	Paul Menard	Wood Brothers Racing	Ford
22	Joey Logano	Team Penske	Ford
24	William Byron	Hendrick Motorsports	Chevrolet
27	Joe Nemechek (i)	Premium Motorsports	Chevrolet
32	Corey LaJoie	Go Fas Racing	Ford
34	Michael McDowell	Front Row Motorsports	Ford
36	Matt Tifft (R)	Front Row Motorsports	Ford
37	Chris Buescher	JTG Daugherty Racing	Chevrolet
38	David Ragan	Front Row Motorsports	Ford
41	Daniel Suárez	Stewart-Haas Racing	Ford
42	Kyle Larson	Chip Ganassi Racing	Chevrolet
43	Bubba Wallace	Richard Petty Motorsports	Chevrolet
47	Ryan Preece (R)	JTG Daugherty Racing	Chevrolet
48	Jimmie Johnson	Hendrick Motorsports	Chevrolet
51	B. J. McLeod (i)	Petty Ware Racing	Ford
52	Garrett Smithley (i)	Rick Ware Racing	Ford
53	J. J. Yeley (i)	Rick Ware Racing	Ford
66	Joey Gase (i)	MBM Motorsports	Toyota
77	Reed Sorenson	Spire Motorsports	Chevrolet
88	Alex Bowman	Hendrick Motorsports	Chevrolet
95	Matt DiBenedetto	Leavine Family Racing	Toyota
Official entry list

== Practice ==
=== First practice ===
Clint Bowyer was the fastest in the first practice session with a time of 30.327 seconds and a speed of 178.059 mph (286.558 km/h).

Pos	No.	Driver	Team	Manufacturer	Time	Speed
1	14	Clint Bowyer	Stewart-Haas Racing	Ford	30.327	178.059
2	24	William Byron	Hendrick Motorsports	Chevrolet	30.470	177.223
3	48	Jimmie Johnson	Hendrick Motorsports	Chevrolet	30.483	177.148
Official first practice results

=== Final practice ===
Kurt Busch was the fastest in the final practice session with a time of 30.461 seconds and a speed of 177.276 mph (285.298 km/h).

Pos	No.	Driver	Team	Manufacturer	Time	Speed
1	1	Kurt Busch	Chip Ganassi Racing	Chevrolet	30.461	177.276
2	22	Joey Logano	Team Penske	Ford	30.546	176.783
3	2	Brad Keselowski	Team Penske	Ford	30.626	176.321
Official final practice results

== Qualifying ==
Clint Bowyer scored the pole for the race with a time of 30.180 and a speed of 178.926 mph (287.953 km/h).

=== Qualifying results ===
Pos	No.	Driver	Team	Manufacturer	Time
1	14	Clint Bowyer	Stewart-Haas Racing	Ford	30.180
2	41	Daniel Suárez	Stewart-Haas Racing	Ford	30.189
3	4	Kevin Harvick	Stewart-Haas Racing	Ford	30.206
4	10	Aric Almirola	Stewart-Haas Racing	Ford	30.252
5	1	Kurt Busch	Chip Ganassi Racing	Chevrolet	30.318
6	8	Daniel Hemric (R)	Richard Childress Racing	Chevrolet	30.366
7	3	Austin Dillon	Richard Childress Racing	Chevrolet	30.454
8	9	Chase Elliott	Hendrick Motorsports	Chevrolet	30.463
9	48	Jimmie Johnson	Hendrick Motorsports	Chevrolet	30.488
10	34	Michael McDowell	Front Row Motorsports	Ford	30.490
11	38	David Ragan	Front Row Motorsports	Ford	30.527
12	17	Ricky Stenhouse Jr.	Roush Fenway Racing	Ford	30.531
13	11	Denny Hamlin	Joe Gibbs Racing	Toyota	30.539
14	24	William Byron	Hendrick Motorsports	Chevrolet	30.567
15	42	Kyle Larson	Chip Ganassi Racing	Chevrolet	30.590
16	47	Ryan Preece (R)	JTG Daugherty Racing	Chevrolet	30.615
17	6	Ryan Newman	Roush Fenway Racing	Ford	30.618
18	2	Brad Keselowski	Team Penske	Ford	30.619
19	88	Alex Bowman	Hendrick Motorsports	Chevrolet	30.620
20	18	Kyle Busch	Joe Gibbs Racing	Toyota	30.633
21	21	Paul Menard	Wood Brothers Racing	Ford	30.672
22	22	Joey Logano	Team Penske	Ford	30.674
23	12	Ryan Blaney	Team Penske	Ford	30.706
24	19	Martin Truex Jr.	Joe Gibbs Racing	Toyota	30.721
25	95	Matt DiBenedetto	Leavine Family Racing	Toyota	30.726
26	20	Erik Jones	Joe Gibbs Racing	Toyota	30.740
27	13	Ty Dillon	Germain Racing	Chevrolet	30.742
28	37	Chris Buescher	JTG Daugherty Racing	Chevrolet	30.774
29	36	Matt Tifft (R)	Front Row Motorsports	Ford	30.808
30	00	Landon Cassill (i)	StarCom Racing	Chevrolet	30.839
31	43	Bubba Wallace	Richard Petty Motorsports	Chevrolet	30.893
32	15	Ross Chastain (i)	Premium Motorsports	Chevrolet	31.027
33	32	Corey LaJoie	Go Fas Racing	Ford	31.081
34	52	Garrett Smithley (i)	Rick Ware Racing	Ford	31.411
35	51	B. J. McLeod (i)	Petty Ware Racing	Ford	31.413
36	53	J. J. Yeley (i)	Rick Ware Racing	Ford	31.538
37	77	Reed Sorenson	Spire Motorsports	Chevrolet	31.572
38	27	Joe Nemechek (i)	Premium Motorsports	Chevrolet	32.070
39	66	Joey Gase (i)	MBM Motorsports	Toyota	32.086
Official qualifying results

== Race ==
=== Stage results ===
Stage One Laps: 80

Pos	No	Driver	Team	Manufacturer	Points
1	22	Joey Logano	Team Penske	Ford	10
2	4	Kevin Harvick	Stewart-Haas Racing	Ford	9
3	10	Aric Almirola	Stewart-Haas Racing	Ford	8
4	41	Daniel Suárez	Stewart-Haas Racing	Ford	7
5	3	Austin Dillon	Richard Childress Racing	Chevrolet	6
6	1	Kurt Busch	Chip Ganassi Racing	Chevrolet	5
7	24	William Byron	Hendrick Motorsports	Chevrolet	4
8	19	Martin Truex Jr.	Joe Gibbs Racing	Toyota	3
9	42	Kyle Larson	Chip Ganassi Racing	Chevrolet	2
10	20	Erik Jones	Joe Gibbs Racing	Toyota	1
Official stage one results

Stage Two Laps: 80

Pos	No	Driver	Team	Manufacturer	Points
1	19	Martin Truex Jr.	Joe Gibbs Racing	Toyota	10
2	22	Joey Logano	Team Penske	Ford	9
3	42	Kyle Larson	Chip Ganassi Racing	Chevrolet	8
4	4	Kevin Harvick	Stewart-Haas Racing	Ford	7
5	9	Chase Elliott	Hendrick Motorsports	Chevrolet	6
6	24	William Byron	Hendrick Motorsports	Chevrolet	5
7	11	Denny Hamlin	Joe Gibbs Racing	Toyota	4
8	12	Ryan Blaney	Team Penske	Ford	3
9	1	Kurt Busch	Chip Ganassi Racing	Chevrolet	2
10	88	Alex Bowman	Hendrick Motorsports	Chevrolet	1
Official stage two results

=== Final stage results ===
Stage Three Laps: 107

Pos	Grid	No	Driver	Team	Manufacturer	Laps	Points
1	24	19	Martin Truex Jr.	Joe Gibbs Racing	Toyota	267	53
2	3	4	Kevin Harvick	Stewart-Haas Racing	Ford	267	51
3	18	2	Brad Keselowski	Team Penske	Ford	267	34
4	8	9	Chase Elliott	Hendrick Motorsports	Chevrolet	267	39
5	23	12	Ryan Blaney	Team Penske	Ford	267	35
6	19	88	Alex Bowman	Hendrick Motorsports	Chevrolet	267	32
7	14	24	William Byron	Hendrick Motorsports	Chevrolet	267	39
8	15	42	Kyle Larson	Chip Ganassi Racing	Chevrolet	267	39
9	22	22	Joey Logano	Team Penske	Ford	267	47
10	17	6	Ryan Newman	Roush Fenway Racing	Ford	267	27
11	9	48	Jimmie Johnson	Hendrick Motorsports	Chevrolet	267	26
12	7	3	Austin Dillon	Richard Childress Racing	Chevrolet	267	31
13	4	10	Aric Almirola	Stewart-Haas Racing	Ford	267	32
14	21	21	Paul Menard	Wood Brothers Racing	Ford	267	23
15	13	11	Denny Hamlin	Joe Gibbs Racing	Toyota	267	26
16	27	13	Ty Dillon	Germain Racing	Chevrolet	267	21
17	6	8	Daniel Hemric (R)	Richard Childress Racing	Chevrolet	267	20
18	28	37	Chris Buescher	JTG Daugherty Racing	Chevrolet	266	19
19	20	18	Kyle Busch	Joe Gibbs Racing	Toyota	266	18
20	2	41	Daniel Suárez	Stewart-Haas Racing	Ford	266	24
21	25	95	Matt DiBenedetto	Leavine Family Racing	Toyota	266	16
22	11	38	David Ragan	Front Row Motorsports	Ford	266	15
23	31	43	Bubba Wallace	Richard Petty Motorsports	Chevrolet	266	14
24	10	34	Michael McDowell	Front Row Motorsports	Ford	266	13
25	1	14	Clint Bowyer	Stewart-Haas Racing	Ford	266	12
26	12	17	Ricky Stenhouse Jr.	Roush Fenway Racing	Ford	265	11
27	16	47	Ryan Preece (R)	JTG Daugherty Racing	Chevrolet	265	10
28	33	32	Corey LaJoie	Go Fas Racing	Ford	265	9
29	30	00	Landon Cassill (i)	StarCom Racing	Chevrolet	265	0
30	29	36	Matt Tifft (R)	Front Row Motorsports	Ford	264	7
31	32	15	Ross Chastain (i)	Premium Motorsports	Chevrolet	262	0
32	36	53	J. J. Yeley (i)	Rick Ware Racing	Ford	260	0
33	35	51	B. J. McLeod (i)	Petty Ware Racing	Ford	259	0
34	38	27	Joe Nemechek (i)	Premium Motorsports	Chevrolet	257	0
35	34	52	Garrett Smithley (i)	Rick Ware Racing	Ford	255	0
36	26	20	Erik Jones	Joe Gibbs Racing	Toyota	254	2
37	37	77	Reed Sorenson	Spire Motorsports	Toyota	250	1
38	39	66	Joey Gase (i)	MBM Motorsports	Toyota	249	0
39	5	1	Kurt Busch	Chip Ganassi Racing	Chevrolet	187	8
Official race results

=== Kyle Busch/Garrett Smithley incident ===
Late in the race, Kyle Busch was battling for position with William Byron when #52 Honest Abe Roofing driver Garrett Smithley, who was laps down, couldn't move down to get out of the way of the lead lap cars. Kyle Busch also didn't have enough time to move down, and Busch would hit Smithley in the rear. Busch would have major front end damage, saying "think the nose is knocked in. Fucking destroyed". Busch would go on to finish 19th, and Smithley 35th, 12 laps down.

Busch was noticeably frustrated during post race interviews, saying:

Reporter 1: What happened there with the #53, there late?
Kyle Busch: #52, get it right. Don´t know.
Reporter 1: And how´d that impact your car?
Kyle Busch: Killed it.
Reporter 1: What did you think... were you happy that you were able to come back after the early damage to your (car)?
Kyle Busch: Nope.
Reporter 1: What happened there at the beginning of the race?
Kyle Busch: I´m just here so I don´t get fined.
Reporter 2: How about the heat? How did it...
Kyle Busch: Felt great.
Reporter 2: You felt fine out there the whole time?
Reporter 1: Based on since you´re doing to a place where you won last time, last year, Richmond...
Kyle Busch: Nope, can´t pass there.
Reporter 1: Do you feel OK about your chances overall at Homestead?
Kyle Busch: Don´t care.
Reporter 3: Does it help any at all that you had the bonus points coming in here, coming out of this race?
Kyle Busch: Just here so I don´t get fined.
Reporter 1: Do you feel like if you were able to get a top 10...
(Kyle Busch´s PR manager walks up to Kyle Busch and talks to Busch)
Kyle Busch: I´m answering the dumbest fucking questions over and over again. Am I good?

On Monday, September 16, Smithley would defend his actions on Twitter, tweeting ¨Held my line... 2 cars got around.¨ Fans were split on the issue- some saying Smithley should have gotten out of the way, while others saying Busch should have moved his line earlier. On the same day, Smithley would post an announcement on Twitter, defending his racing career up to that point and saying that he wasn't mad at Busch. Busch would criticize the skill of lapped car drivers, saying “We’re at the top echelon of motorsports, and we’ve got guys who have never won Late Model races running on the racetrack. It’s pathetic. They don’t know where to go. What else do you do?¨ On September 20, Smithley would tweet ¨Even when I don’t do anything @KyleBusch blames me. Went outta my way to give him room tonight. Think he might have thought I was in a different car. 🤷🏼‍♂️¨. As of now, nothing more has been said, but the question of skill needed in NASCAR has remained, recently brought up by Quin Houff´s incident with Matt Dibenedetto at the 2020 O'Reilly Auto Parts 500.

=== Race statistics ===
- Lead changes: 24 among 14 different drivers
- Cautions/Laps: 4 for 22
- Red flags: 0
- Time of race: 2 hours, 48 minutes and 34 seconds
- Average speed: 142.555 miles per hour (229.420 km/h)

== Media ==
=== Television ===
NBC Sports called the race on the television side. Rick Allen, Jeff Burton, Steve Letarte and Dale Earnhardt Jr. had the call in the booth for the race. Dave Burns, Parker Kligerman, Marty Snider and Kelli Stavast reported from pit lane during the race.

NBCSN
Booth announcers	Pit reporters
Lap-by-lap: Rick Allen; Color-commentator: Jeff Burton; Color-commentator: Steve Letarte; Color-commentator: Dale Earnhardt Jr.	Dave Burns; Parker Kligerman; Marty Snider; Kelli Stavast

=== Radio ===
PRN covered the radio call for the race which was also simulcast on Sirius XM NASCAR Radio. Doug Rice and Mark Garrow called the race in the booth when the field raced through the tri-oval. Rob Albright called the race from a billboard in turn 2 when the field raced through turns 1 and 2 & Pat Patterson called the race from a billboard outside of turn 3 when the field raced through turns 3 and 4. Brad Gillie, Brett McMillan, Wendy Venturini, and Heather DeBeaux worked pit road for the radio side.

PRN
Booth announcers	Turn announcers	Pit reporters
Lead announcer: Doug Rice; Announcer: Mark Garrow	Turns 1 & 2: Rob Albright; Turns 3 & 4: Pat Patterson	Brad Gillie; Brett McMillan; Wendy Venturini; Heather DeBeaux

== Standings after the race ==
	Pos	Driver	Points
2	1	Martin Truex Jr.	2,082
3	2	Kevin Harvick	2,079 (–3)
1	3	Joey Logano	2,075 (–7)
3	4	Kyle Busch	2,063 (–19)
1	5	Brad Keselowski	2,058 (–24)
1	6	Chase Elliott	2,057 (–25)
5	7	Denny Hamlin	2,056 (–26)
1	8	Kyle Larson	2,044 (–38)
4	9	William Byron	2,040 (–42)
2	10	Ryan Blaney	2,039 (–43)
1	11	Alex Bowman	2,037 (–45)
2	12	Aric Almirola	2,033 (–49)
3	13	Ryan Newman	2,027 (–55)
6	14	Kurt Busch	2,019 (–63)
	15	Clint Bowyer	2,012 (–70)
5	16	Erik Jones	2,007 (–75)
Official driver's standings

Manufacturers' Championship standings

Pos	Manufacturer	Points
1	Toyota	991
2	Ford	958 (–33)
3	Chevrolet	916 (–75)

- Note: Only the first 16 positions are included for the driver standings.

Previous race: 2019 Brickyard 400	Monster Energy NASCAR Cup Series; 2019 season	Next race: 2019 Federated Auto Parts 400
