= 2019 Federated Auto Parts 400 =

Race details
- Race 28 of 36 in the 2019 Monster Energy NASCAR Cup Series
- Date: September 21, 2019
- Location: Richmond Raceway in Richmond, Virginia
- Course: Permanent racing facility
- Course length: .75 miles (1.2 km)
- Distance: 400 laps, 300 mi (480 km)
- Average speed: 101.437 miles per hour (163.247 km/h)

Pole position
Driver	Brad Keselowski	Team Penske
- Time: 21.229

Most laps led
Driver	Kyle Busch	Joe Gibbs Racing
- Laps: 202

Winner
No. 19	Martin Truex Jr.	Joe Gibbs Racing

Television in the United States
- Network: NBCSN
- Announcers: Rick Allen, Jeff Burton, Steve Letarte and Dale Earnhardt Jr.
- Nielsen ratings: 1.779 million

Radio in the United States
- Radio: MRN
- Booth announcers: Alex Hayden, Jeff Striegle and Rusty Wallace
- Turn announcers: Dave Moody (Backstretch)

The 2019 Federated Auto Parts 400 was a Monster Energy NASCAR Cup Series race held on September 21, 2019, at Richmond Raceway in Richmond, Virginia. The race was contested over 400 laps on the 0.75-mile (1.21 km) D-shaped short track. It was the 28th race of the 2019 Monster Energy NASCAR Cup Series season, the second race of the Playoffs, and the second race of the Round of 16.

Joe Gibbs Racing initially achieved a historic 1-2-3-4 finish, but it was short-lived, as Erik Jones was disqualified following the race after failing post-race inspection, thus altering the team's dominant outcome.

== Report ==
=== Background ===
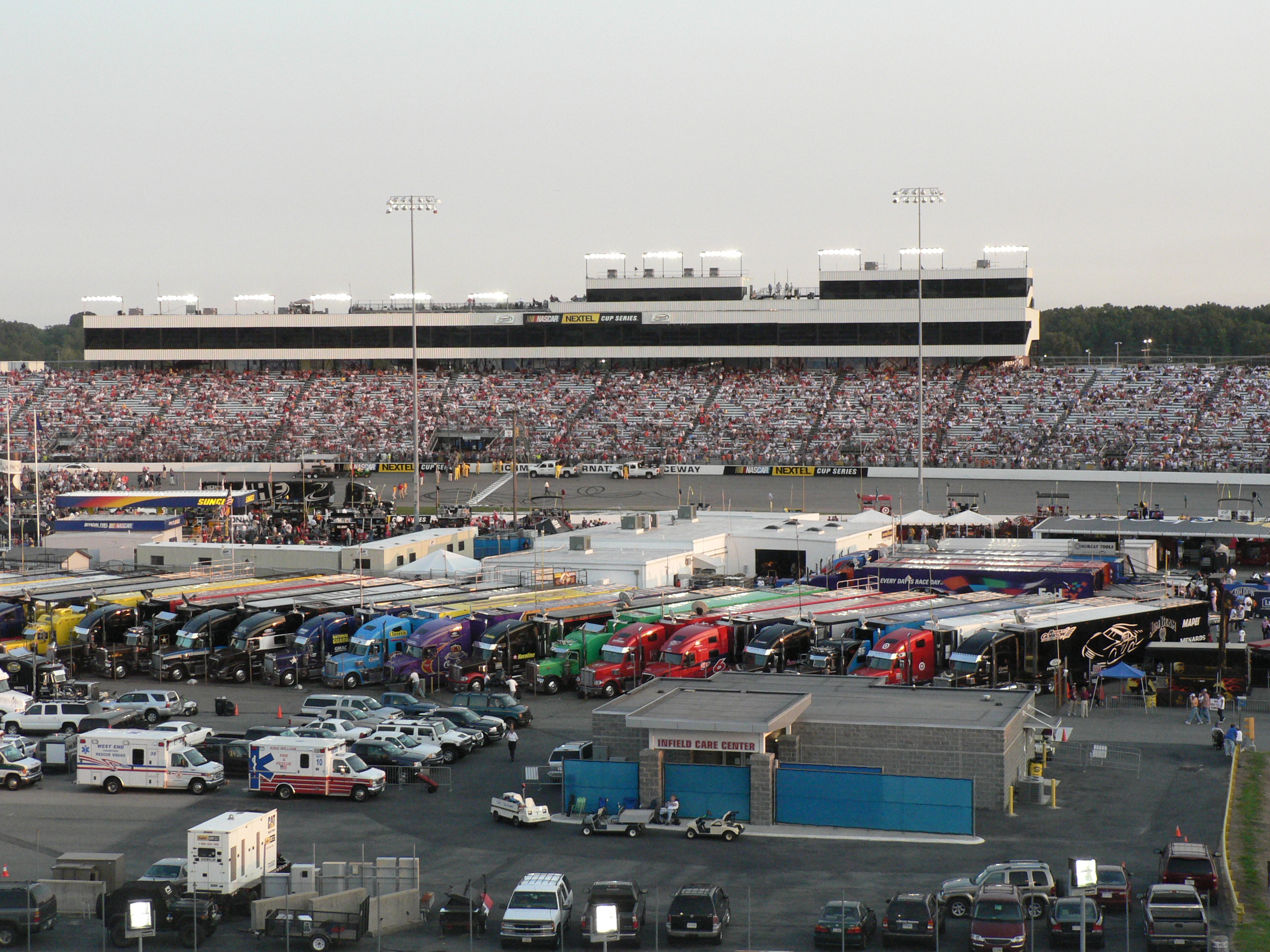
Richmond Raceway, the track where the race was held.

Richmond Raceway (RR), formerly known as Richmond International Raceway (RIR), is a 3/4-mile (1.2 km), D-shaped, asphalt race track located just outside Richmond, Virginia in Henrico County. It hosts the Monster Energy NASCAR Cup Series, the NASCAR Xfinity Series, and the IndyCar series. Known as "America's premier short track", it formerly hosted a NASCAR Gander Outdoors Truck Series race, and two USAC sprint car races.

==== Entry list ====
- (i) denotes driver who are ineligible for series driver points.
- (R) denotes rookie driver.

No.	Driver	Team	Manufacturer
00	Landon Cassill (i)	StarCom Racing	Chevrolet
1	Kurt Busch	Chip Ganassi Racing	Chevrolet
2	Brad Keselowski	Team Penske	Ford
3	Austin Dillon	Richard Childress Racing	Chevrolet
4	Kevin Harvick	Stewart-Haas Racing	Ford
6	Ryan Newman	Roush Fenway Racing	Ford
8	Daniel Hemric (R)	Richard Childress Racing	Chevrolet
9	Chase Elliott	Hendrick Motorsports	Chevrolet
10	Aric Almirola	Stewart-Haas Racing	Ford
11	Denny Hamlin	Joe Gibbs Racing	Toyota
12	Ryan Blaney	Team Penske	Ford
13	Ty Dillon	Germain Racing	Chevrolet
14	Clint Bowyer	Stewart-Haas Racing	Ford
15	Ross Chastain (i)	Premium Motorsports	Chevrolet
17	Ricky Stenhouse Jr.	Roush Fenway Racing	Ford
18	Kyle Busch	Joe Gibbs Racing	Toyota
19	Martin Truex Jr.	Joe Gibbs Racing	Toyota
20	Erik Jones	Joe Gibbs Racing	Toyota
21	Paul Menard	Wood Brothers Racing	Ford
22	Joey Logano	Team Penske	Ford
24	William Byron	Hendrick Motorsports	Chevrolet
27	Quin Houff	Premium Motorsports	Chevrolet
32	Corey LaJoie	Go Fas Racing	Ford
34	Michael McDowell	Front Row Motorsports	Ford
36	Matt Tifft (R)	Front Row Motorsports	Ford
37	Chris Buescher	JTG Daugherty Racing	Chevrolet
38	David Ragan	Front Row Motorsports	Ford
41	Daniel Suárez	Stewart-Haas Racing	Ford
42	Kyle Larson	Chip Ganassi Racing	Chevrolet
43	Bubba Wallace	Richard Petty Motorsports	Chevrolet
47	Ryan Preece (R)	JTG Daugherty Racing	Chevrolet
48	Jimmie Johnson	Hendrick Motorsports	Chevrolet
51	Austin Theriault	Petty Ware Racing	Chevrolet
52	J. J. Yeley (i)	Rick Ware Racing	Ford
53	Spencer Boyd (i)	Rick Ware Racing	Chevrolet
77	Reed Sorenson	Spire Motorsports	Chevrolet
88	Alex Bowman	Hendrick Motorsports	Chevrolet
95	Matt DiBenedetto	Leavine Family Racing	Toyota
Official entry list

== Practice ==
=== First practice ===
Chris Buescher was the fastest in the first practice session with a time of 22.287 seconds and a speed of 121.147 mph (194.967 km/h).

Pos	No.	Driver	Team	Manufacturer	Time	Speed
1	37	Chris Buescher	JTG Daugherty Racing	Chevrolet	22.287	121.147
2	22	Joey Logano	Team Penske	Ford	22.321	120.962
3	24	William Byron	Hendrick Motorsports	Chevrolet	22.346	120.827
Official first practice results

=== Final practice ===
Martin Truex Jr. was the fastest in the final practice session with a time of 22.152 seconds and a speed of 121.885 mph (196.155 km/h).

Pos	No.	Driver	Team	Manufacturer	Time	Speed
1	19	Martin Truex Jr.	Joe Gibbs Racing	Toyota	22.152	121.885
2	9	Chase Elliott	Hendrick Motorsports	Chevrolet	22.526	119.861
3	8	Daniel Hemric (R)	Richard Childress Racing	Chevrolet	22.638	119.268
Official final practice results

== Qualifying ==
Brad Keselowski scored the pole for the race with a time of 21.229 and a speed of 127.185 mph (204.684 km/h).

=== Qualifying results ===
Pos	No.	Driver	Team	Manufacturer	Time
1	2	Brad Keselowski	Team Penske	Ford	21.229
2	4	Kevin Harvick	Stewart-Haas Racing	Ford	21.334
3	9	Chase Elliott	Hendrick Motorsports	Chevrolet	21.399
4	18	Kyle Busch	Joe Gibbs Racing	Toyota	21.411
5	14	Clint Bowyer	Stewart-Haas Racing	Ford	21.417
6	11	Denny Hamlin	Joe Gibbs Racing	Toyota	21.442
7	10	Aric Almirola	Stewart-Haas Racing	Ford	21.509
8	19	Martin Truex Jr.	Joe Gibbs Racing	Toyota	21.526
9	1	Kurt Busch	Chip Ganassi Racing	Chevrolet	21.563
10	48	Jimmie Johnson	Hendrick Motorsports	Chevrolet	21.569
11	34	Michael McDowell	Front Row Motorsports	Ford	21.585
12	95	Matt DiBenedetto	Leavine Family Racing	Toyota	21.598
13	42	Kyle Larson	Chip Ganassi Racing	Chevrolet	21.605
14	41	Daniel Suárez	Stewart-Haas Racing	Ford	21.609
15	12	Ryan Blaney	Team Penske	Ford	21.612
16	20	Erik Jones	Joe Gibbs Racing	Toyota	21.617
17	3	Austin Dillon	Richard Childress Racing	Chevrolet	21.631
18	17	Ricky Stenhouse Jr.	Roush Fenway Racing	Ford	21.640
19	6	Ryan Newman	Roush Fenway Racing	Ford	21.655
20	88	Alex Bowman	Hendrick Motorsports	Chevrolet	21.660
21	47	Ryan Preece (R)	JTG Daugherty Racing	Chevrolet	21.699
22	8	Daniel Hemric (R)	Richard Childress Racing	Chevrolet	21.702
23	37	Chris Buescher	JTG Daugherty Racing	Chevrolet	21.737
24	21	Paul Menard	Wood Brothers Racing	Ford	21.747
25	24	William Byron	Hendrick Motorsports	Chevrolet	21.808
26	36	Matt Tifft (R)	Front Row Motorsports	Ford	21.865
27	38	David Ragan	Front Row Motorsports	Ford	21.873
28	22	Joey Logano	Team Penske	Ford	21.896
29	32	Corey LaJoie	Go Fas Racing	Ford	21.910
30	43	Bubba Wallace	Richard Petty Motorsports	Chevrolet	21.960
31	13	Ty Dillon	Germain Racing	Chevrolet	22.061
32	15	Ross Chastain (i)	Premium Motorsports	Chevrolet	22.124
33	52	J. J. Yeley (i)	Rick Ware Racing	Ford	22.262
34	51	Austin Theriault	Petty Ware Racing	Chevrolet	22.329
35	77	Reed Sorenson	Spire Motorsports	Chevrolet	22.350
36	00	Landon Cassill (i)	StarCom Racing	Chevrolet	22.455
37	53	Spencer Boyd (i)	Rick Ware Racing	Chevrolet	22.584
38	27	Quin Houff	Premium Motorsports	Chevrolet	22.654
Official qualifying results

== Race ==
=== Stage results ===
Stage One Laps: 100

Pos	No	Driver	Team	Manufacturer	Points
1	19	Martin Truex Jr.	Joe Gibbs Racing	Toyota	10
2	18	Kyle Busch	Joe Gibbs Racing	Toyota	9
3	2	Brad Keselowski	Team Penske	Ford	8
4	11	Denny Hamlin	Joe Gibbs Racing	Toyota	7
5	4	Kevin Harvick	Stewart-Haas Racing	Ford	6
6	14	Clint Bowyer	Stewart-Haas Racing	Ford	5
7	95	Matt DiBenedetto	Leavine Family Racing	Toyota	4
8	9	Chase Elliott	Hendrick Motorsports	Chevrolet	3
9	48	Jimmie Johnson	Hendrick Motorsports	Chevrolet	2
10	1	Kurt Busch	Chip Ganassi Racing	Chevrolet	1
Official stage one results

Stage Two Laps: 100

Pos	No	Driver	Team	Manufacturer	Points
1	18	Kyle Busch	Joe Gibbs Racing	Toyota	10
2	19	Martin Truex Jr.	Joe Gibbs Racing	Toyota	9
3	11	Denny Hamlin	Joe Gibbs Racing	Toyota	8
4	2	Brad Keselowski	Team Penske	Ford	7
5	6	Ryan Newman	Roush Fenway Racing	Ford	6
6	4	Kevin Harvick	Stewart-Haas Racing	Ford	5
7	9	Chase Elliott	Hendrick Motorsports	Chevrolet	4
8	14	Clint Bowyer	Stewart-Haas Racing	Ford	3
9	48	Jimmie Johnson	Hendrick Motorsports	Chevrolet	2
10	42	Kyle Larson	Chip Ganassi Racing	Chevrolet	1
Official stage two results

=== Final stage results ===
Stage Three Laps: 200

Pos	Grid	No	Driver	Team	Manufacturer	Laps	Points
1	8	19	Martin Truex Jr.	Joe Gibbs Racing	Toyota	400	59
2	4	18	Kyle Busch	Joe Gibbs Racing	Toyota	400	54
3	6	11	Denny Hamlin	Joe Gibbs Racing	Toyota	400	49
4	1	2	Brad Keselowski	Team Penske	Ford	400	48
5	19	6	Ryan Newman	Roush Fenway Racing	Ford	400	38
6	13	42	Kyle Larson	Chip Ganassi Racing	Chevrolet	400	32
7	2	4	Kevin Harvick	Stewart-Haas Racing	Ford	400	41
8	5	14	Clint Bowyer	Stewart-Haas Racing	Ford	400	37
9	14	41	Daniel Suárez	Stewart-Haas Racing	Ford	400	28
10	10	48	Jimmie Johnson	Hendrick Motorsports	Chevrolet	400	31
11	28	22	Joey Logano	Team Penske	Ford	400	26
12	37	43	Bubba Wallace	Richard Petty Motorsports	Chevrolet	400	25
13	3	9	Chase Elliott	Hendrick Motorsports	Chevrolet	399	31
14	12	95	Matt DiBenedetto	Leavine Family Racing	Toyota	399	27
15	18	17	Ricky Stenhouse Jr.	Roush Fenway Racing	Ford	399	22
16	7	10	Aric Almirola	Stewart-Haas Racing	Ford	399	21
17	15	12	Ryan Blaney	Team Penske	Ford	399	20
18	9	1	Kurt Busch	Chip Ganassi Racing	Chevrolet	398	19
19	27	38	David Ragan	Front Row Motorsports	Ford	398	18
20	26	36	Matt Tifft (R)	Front Row Motorsports	Ford	397	17
21	11	34	Michael McDowell	Front Row Motorsports	Ford	397	16
22	17	3	Austin Dillon	Richard Childress Racing	Chevrolet	396	15
23	20	88	Alex Bowman	Hendrick Motorsports	Chevrolet	396	14
24	25	24	William Byron	Hendrick Motorsports	Chevrolet	396	13
25	22	8	Daniel Hemric (R)	Richard Childress Racing	Chevrolet	396	12
26	30	13	Ty Dillon	Germain Racing	Chevrolet	396	11
27	24	21	Paul Menard	Wood Brothers Racing	Ford	395	10
28	34	00	Landon Cassill (i)	StarCom Racing	Chevrolet	395	0
29	29	32	Corey LaJoie	Go Fas Racing	Ford	395	8
30	21	47	Ryan Preece (R)	JTG Daugherty Racing	Chevrolet	394	7
31	23	37	Chris Buescher	JTG Daugherty Racing	Chevrolet	393	6
32	32	51	Austin Theriault	Petty Ware Racing	Chevrolet	392	5
33	38	52	J. J. Yeley (i)	Rick Ware Racing	Ford	391	0
34	35	53	Spencer Boyd (i)	Rick Ware Racing	Chevrolet	388	0
35	36	27	Quin Houff	Premium Motorsports	Chevrolet	384	2
36	31	15	Ross Chastain (i)	Premium Motorsports	Chevrolet	265	0
37	33	77	Reed Sorenson	Spire Motorsports	Chevrolet	233	1
DSQ	16	20	Erik Jones. (Note: Jones originally finished fourth, but was later disqualified due to an issue with his car's rear-wheel alignment. Jones became the first ever Cup driver under the new inspection rules to be disqualified due to failing post-race inspection.)	Joe Gibbs Racing	Toyota	400	1^
Official race results

=== Race statistics ===
- Lead changes: 6 among 3 different drivers
- Cautions/Laps: 5 for 32
- Red flags: 0
- Time of race: 2 hours, 57 minutes and 27 seconds
- Average speed: 101.437 miles per hour (163.247 km/h)

== Media ==
=== Television ===
NBC Sports covered the race on the television side. Rick Allen, Jeff Burton, Steve Letarte and three-time Richmond winner Dale Earnhardt Jr. had the call in the booth for the race. Dave Burns, Parker Kligerman, Kelli Stavast and Dillon Welch will report from pit lane during the race.

NBCSN
Booth announcers	Pit reporters
Lap-by-lap: Rick Allen; Color-commentator: Jeff Burton; Color-commentator: Steve Letarte; Color-commentator: Dale Earnhardt Jr.	Dave Burns; Parker Kligerman; Kelli Stavast; Dillon Welch

=== Radio ===
The Motor Racing Network had the radio call for the race, which was simulcast on Sirius XM NASCAR Radio. Alex Hayden, Jeff Striegle, and 6-time winner at Richmond Rusty Wallace had the call in the broadcast booth for MRN when the field raced thru the front straightaway. Dave Moody called the race from a platform when the field raced down the backstraightaway. Steve Post, Jason Toy, and Woody Cain called the action for MRN from pit lane.

MRN
Booth announcers	Turn announcers	Pit reporters
Lead announcer: Alex Hayden; Announcer: Jeff Striegle; Announcer: Rusty Wallace	Backstretch: Dave Moody	Steve Post; Jason Toy; Woody Cain

== Standings after the race ==
	Pos	Driver	Points
	1	Martin Truex Jr.	2,141
	2	Kevin Harvick	2,120 (–21)
1	3	Kyle Busch	2,117 (–24)
1	4	Brad Keselowski	2,106 (–35)
2	5	Denny Hamlin	2,105 (–36)
3	6	Joey Logano	2,101 (–40)
1	7	Chase Elliott	2,088 (–53)
	8	Kyle Larson	2,076 (–65)
4	9	Ryan Newman	2,065 (–76)
	10	Ryan Blaney	2,059 (–82)
1	11	Aric Almirola	2,054 (–87)
3	12	William Byron	2,053 (–88)
2	13	Alex Bowman	2,051 (–90)
1	14	Clint Bowyer	2,049 (–92)
1	15	Kurt Busch	2,039 (–102)
	16	Erik Jones	2,008 (–133)
Official driver's standings

Manufacturers' Championship standings

Pos	Manufacturer	Points
1	Toyota	1,028
2	Ford	991 (–37)
3	Chevrolet	947 (–81)

- Note: Only the first 16 positions are included for the driver standings.

== Notes ==
Previous race: 2019 South Point 400	Monster Energy NASCAR Cup Series; 2019 season	Next race: 2019 Bank of America Roval 400
