= 2019 Bass Pro Shops NRA Night Race =

Race details
- Race 24 of 36 in the 2019 Monster Energy NASCAR Cup Series
- The 2019 Bass Pro Shops NRA Night Race program cover, featuring the finish of the 1999 Goody's Headache Powder 500 between Dale Earnhardt and Terry Labonte.
- Date: August 17, 2019
- Location: Bristol Motor Speedway in Bristol, Tennessee
- Course: Permanent racing facility
- Course length: .533 miles (.858 km)
- Distance: 500 laps, 266.5 mi (429 km)
- Average speed: 94.531 miles per hour (152.133 km/h)

Pole position
Driver	Denny Hamlin	Joe Gibbs Racing
- Time: 14.848

Most laps led
Driver	Matt DiBenedetto	Leavine Family Racing
- Laps: 93

Winner
No. 11	Denny Hamlin	Joe Gibbs Racing

Television in the United States
- Network: NBCSN
- Announcers: Rick Allen, Jeff Burton and Steve Letarte
- Nielsen ratings: 2.503 million

Radio in the United States
- Radio: PRN
- Booth announcers: Doug Rice and Mark Garrow
- Turn announcers: Rob Albright (Backstretch)

The 2019 Bass Pro Shops NRA Night Race was a Monster Energy NASCAR Cup Series race held on August 17, 2019 at Bristol Motor Speedway in Bristol, Tennessee. Contested over 500 laps on the .533-mile (0.858 km) short track, it was the 24th race of the 2019 Monster Energy NASCAR Cup Series season.

== Report ==
=== Background ===
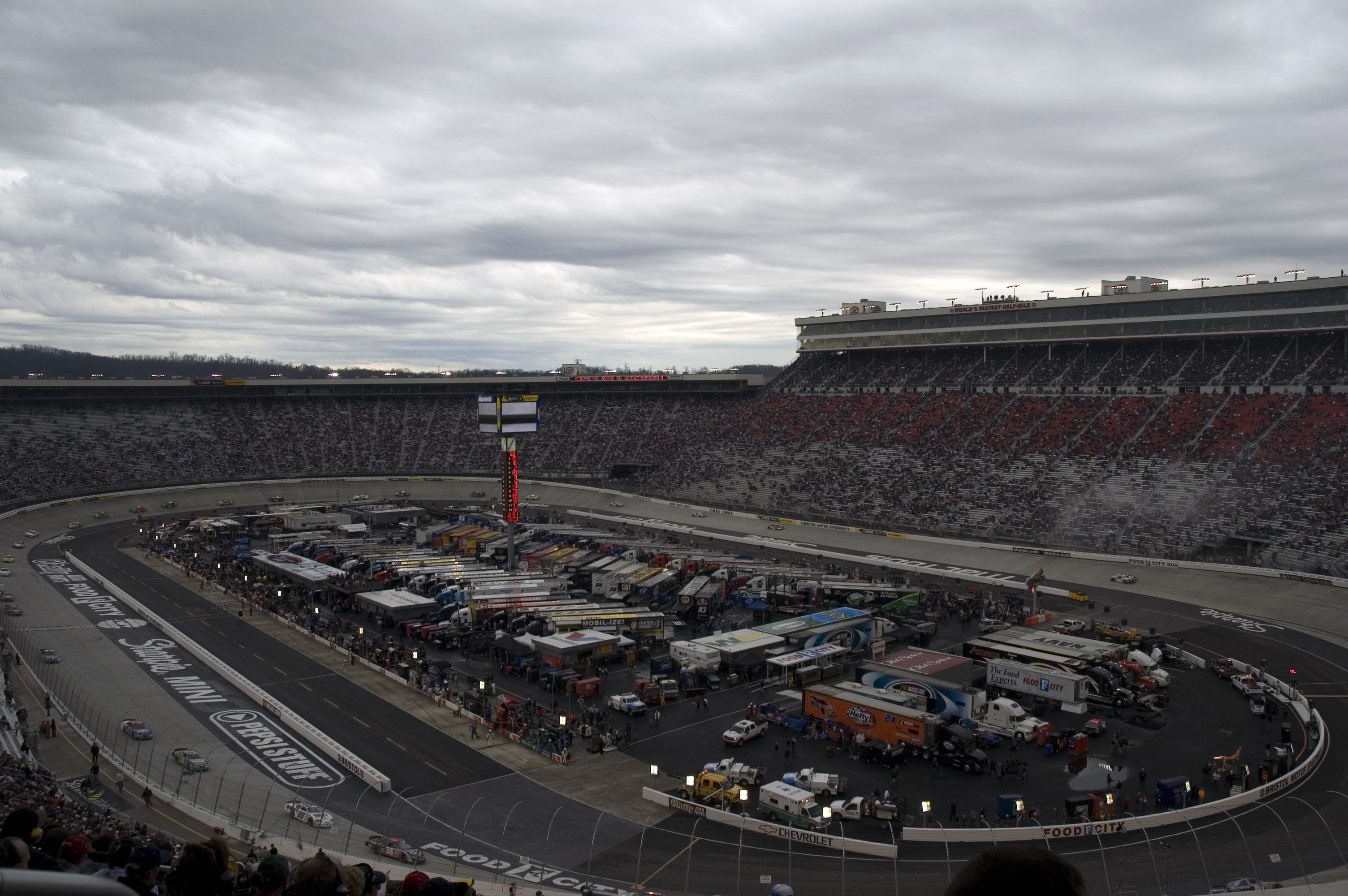
Bristol Motor Speedway, the track where the race was held.

The Bristol Motor Speedway, formerly known as Bristol International Raceway and Bristol Raceway, is a NASCAR short track venue located in Bristol, Tennessee. Constructed in 1960, it held its first NASCAR race on July 30, 1961. Despite its short length, Bristol is among the most popular tracks on the NASCAR schedule because of its distinct features, which include extraordinarily steep banking, an all concrete surface, two pit roads, and stadium-like seating. It has also been named one of the loudest NASCAR tracks.

During driver introductions, a unique tradition is held where drivers are allowed to introduce themselves with a song of their choosing.

==== Entry list ====
- (i) denotes driver who are ineligible for series driver points.
- (R) denotes rookie driver.

No.	Driver	Team	Manufacturer
00	Landon Cassill (i)	StarCom Racing	Chevrolet
1	Kurt Busch	Chip Ganassi Racing	Chevrolet
2	Brad Keselowski	Team Penske	Ford
3	Austin Dillon	Richard Childress Racing	Chevrolet
4	Kevin Harvick	Stewart-Haas Racing	Ford
6	Ryan Newman	Roush Fenway Racing	Ford
8	Daniel Hemric (R)	Richard Childress Racing	Chevrolet
9	Chase Elliott	Hendrick Motorsports	Chevrolet
10	Aric Almirola	Stewart-Haas Racing	Ford
11	Denny Hamlin	Joe Gibbs Racing	Toyota
12	Ryan Blaney	Team Penske	Ford
13	Ty Dillon	Germain Racing	Chevrolet
14	Clint Bowyer	Stewart-Haas Racing	Ford
15	Ross Chastain (i)	Premium Motorsports	Chevrolet
17	Ricky Stenhouse Jr.	Roush Fenway Racing	Ford
18	Kyle Busch	Joe Gibbs Racing	Toyota
19	Martin Truex Jr.	Joe Gibbs Racing	Toyota
20	Erik Jones	Joe Gibbs Racing	Toyota
21	Paul Menard	Wood Brothers Racing	Ford
22	Joey Logano	Team Penske	Ford
24	William Byron	Hendrick Motorsports	Chevrolet
27	Quin Houff	Premium Motorsports	Chevrolet
32	Corey LaJoie	Go Fas Racing	Ford
34	Michael McDowell	Front Row Motorsports	Ford
36	Matt Tifft (R)	Front Row Motorsports	Ford
37	Chris Buescher	JTG Daugherty Racing	Chevrolet
38	David Ragan	Front Row Motorsports	Ford
41	Daniel Suárez	Stewart-Haas Racing	Ford
42	Kyle Larson	Chip Ganassi Racing	Chevrolet
43	Bubba Wallace	Richard Petty Motorsports	Chevrolet
47	Ryan Preece (R)	JTG Daugherty Racing	Chevrolet
48	Jimmie Johnson	Hendrick Motorsports	Chevrolet
51	B. J. McLeod (i)	Petty Ware Racing	Chevrolet
52	Kyle Weatherman (i)†	Rick Ware Racing	Chevrolet
53	Josh Bilicki (i)	Rick Ware Racing	Chevrolet
54	J. J. Yeley	Rick Ware Racing	Ford
77	Reed Sorenson	Spire Motorsports	Chevrolet
88	Alex Bowman	Hendrick Motorsports	Chevrolet
95	Matt DiBenedetto	Leavine Family Racing	Toyota
Official entry list

† - Bayley Currey was entered for the No. 52 but was suspended by NASCAR on Thursday before the race due to violating the substance abuse policy. Kyle Weatherman will replace Currey in the No. 52 as a result.

== Practice ==
=== First practice ===
Denny Hamlin was the fastest in the first practice session with a time of 14.920 seconds and a speed of 128.606 mph (206.971 km/h).

Pos	No.	Driver	Team	Manufacturer	Time	Speed
1	11	Denny Hamlin	Joe Gibbs Racing	Toyota	14.920	128.606
2	20	Erik Jones	Joe Gibbs Racing	Toyota	14.973	128.151
3	22	Joey Logano	Team Penske	Ford	15.008	127.852
Official first practice results

=== Final practice ===
Matt DiBenedetto was the fastest in the final practice session with a time of 14.892 seconds and a speed of 128.848 mph (207.361 km/h).

Pos	No.	Driver	Team	Manufacturer	Time	Speed
1	95	Matt DiBenedetto	Leavine Family Racing	Toyota	14.892	128.848
2	12	Ryan Blaney	Team Penske	Ford	14.962	128.245
3	10	Aric Almirola	Stewart-Haas Racing	Ford	14.964	128.228
Official final practice results

== Qualifying ==
Denny Hamlin scored the pole for the race with a time of 14.848 and a speed of 129.230 mph (207.976 km/h). It was the first pole for Toyota in the Cup Series in 2019.

=== Qualifying results ===
Pos	No.	Driver	Team	Manufacturer	Time
1	11	Denny Hamlin	Joe Gibbs Racing	Toyota	14.848
2	42	Kyle Larson	Chip Ganassi Racing	Chevrolet	14.874
3	19	Martin Truex Jr.	Joe Gibbs Racing	Toyota	14.875
4	1	Kurt Busch	Chip Ganassi Racing	Chevrolet	14.896
5	10	Aric Almirola	Stewart-Haas Racing	Ford	14.901
6	9	Chase Elliott	Hendrick Motorsports	Chevrolet	14.923
7	95	Matt DiBenedetto	Leavine Family Racing	Toyota	14.937
8	4	Kevin Harvick	Stewart-Haas Racing	Ford	14.940
9	20	Erik Jones	Joe Gibbs Racing	Toyota	14.945
10	88	Alex Bowman	Hendrick Motorsports	Chevrolet	14.963
11	22	Joey Logano	Team Penske	Ford	14.976
12	12	Ryan Blaney	Team Penske	Ford	14.981
13	2	Brad Keselowski	Team Penske	Ford	14.997
14	6	Ryan Newman	Roush Fenway Racing	Ford	15.002
15	17	Ricky Stenhouse Jr.	Roush Fenway Racing	Ford	15.028
16	38	David Ragan	Front Row Motorsports	Ford	15.053
17	8	Daniel Hemric (R)	Richard Childress Racing	Chevrolet	15.084
18	41	Daniel Suárez	Stewart-Haas Racing	Ford	15.088
19	3	Austin Dillon	Richard Childress Racing	Chevrolet	15.116
20	14	Clint Bowyer	Stewart-Haas Racing	Ford	15.129
21	24	William Byron	Hendrick Motorsports	Chevrolet	15.166
22	43	Bubba Wallace	Richard Petty Motorsports	Chevrolet	15.188
23	47	Ryan Preece (R)	JTG Daugherty Racing	Chevrolet	15.192
24	13	Ty Dillon	Germain Racing	Chevrolet	15.225
25	21	Paul Menard	Wood Brothers Racing	Ford	15.243
26	32	Corey LaJoie	Go Fas Racing	Ford	15.273
27	36	Matt Tifft (R)	Front Row Motorsports	Ford	15.275
28	34	Michael McDowell	Front Row Motorsports	Ford	15.311
29	37	Chris Buescher	JTG Daugherty Racing	Chevrolet	15.314
30	48	Jimmie Johnson	Hendrick Motorsports	Chevrolet	15.331
31	18	Kyle Busch	Joe Gibbs Racing	Toyota	15.340
32	00	Landon Cassill (i)	StarCom Racing	Chevrolet	15.366
33	51	B. J. McLeod (i)	Petty Ware Racing	Chevrolet	15.468
34	27	Quin Houff	Premium Motorsports	Chevrolet	15.579
35	53	Josh Bilicki (i)	Rick Ware Racing	Chevrolet	15.631
36	54	J. J. Yeley	Rick Ware Racing	Ford	15.732
37	77	Reed Sorenson	Spire Motorsports	Chevrolet	15.733
38	52	Kyle Weatherman (i)	Rick Ware Racing	Chevrolet	15.786
39	15	Ross Chastain (i)	Premium Motorsports	Chevrolet	15.840
Official qualifying results

== Race ==
=== Stage results ===
Stage One Laps: 125

Pos	No	Driver	Team	Manufacturer	Points
1	42	Kyle Larson	Chip Ganassi Racing	Chevrolet	10
2	9	Chase Elliott	Hendrick Motorsports	Chevrolet	9
3	19	Martin Truex Jr.	Joe Gibbs Racing	Toyota	8
4	4	Kevin Harvick	Stewart-Haas Racing	Ford	7
5	95	Matt DiBenedetto	Leavine Family Racing	Toyota	6
6	12	Ryan Blaney	Team Penske	Ford	5
7	20	Erik Jones	Joe Gibbs Racing	Toyota	4
8	2	Brad Keselowski	Team Penske	Ford	3
9	1	Kurt Busch	Chip Ganassi Racing	Chevrolet	2
10	10	Aric Almirola	Stewart-Haas Racing	Ford	1
Official stage one results

Stage Two Laps: 125

Pos	No	Driver	Team	Manufacturer	Points
1	1	Kurt Busch	Chip Ganassi Racing	Chevrolet	10
2	41	Daniel Suárez	Stewart-Haas Racing	Ford	9
3	6	Ryan Newman	Roush Fenway Racing	Ford	8
4	18	Kyle Busch	Joe Gibbs Racing	Toyota	7
5	24	William Byron	Hendrick Motorsports	Chevrolet	6
6	9	Chase Elliott	Hendrick Motorsports	Chevrolet	5
7	20	Erik Jones	Joe Gibbs Racing	Toyota	4
8	2	Brad Keselowski	Team Penske	Ford	3
9	8	Daniel Hemric (R)	Richard Childress Racing	Chevrolet	2
10	19	Martin Truex Jr.	Joe Gibbs Racing	Toyota	1
Official stage two results

=== Final stage results ===
Stage Three Laps: 250

Pos	Grid	No	Driver	Team	Manufacturer	Laps	Points
1	1	11	Denny Hamlin	Joe Gibbs Racing	Toyota	500	40
2	7	95	Matt DiBenedetto	Leavine Family Racing	Toyota	500	41
3	13	2	Brad Keselowski	Team Penske	Ford	500	40
4	31	18	Kyle Busch	Joe Gibbs Racing	Toyota	500	40
5	6	9	Chase Elliott	Hendrick Motorsports	Chevrolet	500	46
6	2	42	Kyle Larson	Chip Ganassi Racing	Chevrolet	500	41
7	20	14	Clint Bowyer	Stewart-Haas Racing	Ford	500	30
8	18	41	Daniel Suárez	Stewart-Haas Racing	Ford	499	38
9	4	1	Kurt Busch	Chip Ganassi Racing	Chevrolet	499	40
10	12	12	Ryan Blaney	Team Penske	Ford	499	32
11	14	6	Ryan Newman	Roush Fenway Racing	Ford	499	34
12	17	8	Daniel Hemric (R)	Richard Childress Racing	Chevrolet	499	27
13	3	19	Martin Truex Jr.	Joe Gibbs Racing	Toyota	498	33
14	22	43	Bubba Wallace	Richard Petty Motorsports	Chevrolet	498	23
15	10	88	Alex Bowman	Hendrick Motorsports	Chevrolet	497	22
16	11	22	Joey Logano	Team Penske	Ford	497	21
17	29	37	Chris Buescher	JTG Daugherty Racing	Chevrolet	497	20
18	23	47	Ryan Preece (R)	JTG Daugherty Racing	Chevrolet	497	19
19	30	48	Jimmie Johnson	Hendrick Motorsports	Chevrolet	496	18
20	24	13	Ty Dillon	Germain Racing	Chevrolet	496	17
21	21	24	William Byron	Hendrick Motorsports	Chevrolet	496	22
22	9	20	Erik Jones	Joe Gibbs Racing	Toyota	495	23
23	25	21	Paul Menard	Wood Brothers Racing	Ford	495	14
24	26	32	Corey LaJoie	Go Fas Racing	Ford	494	13
25	32	00	Landon Cassill (i)	StarCom Racing	Chevrolet	490	0
26	39	15	Ross Chastain (i)	Premium Motorsports	Chevrolet	490	0
27	27	36	Matt Tifft (R)	Front Row Motorsports	Ford	487	10
28	36	54	J. J. Yeley	Rick Ware Racing	Ford	485	9
29	5	10	Aric Almirola	Stewart-Haas Racing	Ford	482	9
30	34	27	Quin Houff	Premium Motorsports	Chevrolet	478	7
31	38	52	Kyle Weatherman (i)	Rick Ware Racing	Chevrolet	474	0
32	33	51	B. J. McLeod (i)	Petty Ware Racing	Chevrolet	410	0
33	15	17	Ricky Stenhouse Jr.	Roush Fenway Racing	Ford	391	4
34	19	3	Austin Dillon	Richard Childress Racing	Chevrolet	387	3
35	35	53	Josh Bilicki (i)	Rick Ware Racing	Chevrolet	373	0
36	16	38	David Ragan	Front Row Motorsports	Ford	371	1
37	28	34	Michael McDowell	Front Row Motorsports	Ford	368	1
38	37	77	Reed Sorenson	Spire Motorsports	Chevrolet	269	1
39	8	4	Kevin Harvick	Stewart-Haas Racing	Ford	244	8
Official race results

=== Race statistics ===
- Lead changes: 23 among 10 different drivers
- Cautions/Laps: 8 for 61
- Red flags: 0
- Time of race: 2 hours, 49 minutes and 9 seconds
- Average speed: 94.531 miles per hour (152.133 km/h)

== Media ==
=== Television ===
NBC Sports covered the race on the television side. Rick Allen, 2008 Food City 500 winner Jeff Burton, and Steve Letarte called the race in the booth for the race. Dave Burns, Parker Kligerman, Marty Snider and Kelli Stavast reported from pit lane during the race.

NBC Sports relieved Dale Earnhardt Jr. of duties for this race after an incident at Elizabethton Municipal Airport where a bounced landing led to the Earnhardts' private plane crashing. He, his wife Amy, daughter Isla, and dog Gus were not severely injured, but he was kept out as a precaution.

NBCSN
Booth announcers	Pit reporters
Lap-by-lap: Rick Allen; Color-commentator: Jeff Burton; Color-commentator: Steve Letarte	Dave Burns; Parker Kligerman; Marty Snider; Kelli Stavast

=== Radio ===
The Performance Racing Network had the radio call for the race, which was simulcast on Sirius XM NASCAR Radio. Doug Rice and Mark Garrow called the race from the broadcast booth when the field raced down the front straightaway. Rob Albright called the race when the field raced down the backstretch. Brad Gillie, Brett McMillan, Jim Noble and Wendy Venturini handled the action on pit road for PRN.

PRN
Booth announcers	Turn announcers	Pit reporters
Lead announcer: Doug Rice; Announcer: Mark Garrow	Backstretch: Rob Albright	Brad Gillie; Brett McMillan; Jim Noble; Wendy Venturini

== Standings after the race ==
Drivers' Championship standings

	Pos	Driver	Points
	1	Kyle Busch	932
	2	Joey Logano	893 (–39)
1	3	Denny Hamlin	855 (–77)
1	4	Martin Truex Jr.	838 (–94)
2	5	Kevin Harvick	830 (–102)
	6	Brad Keselowski	794 (–138)
	7	Chase Elliott	757 (–175)
	8	Kurt Busch	741 (–191)
	9	Ryan Blaney	686 (–246)
	10	Alex Bowman	675 (–257)
2	11	Kyle Larson	665 (–267)
	12	William Byron	664 (–268)
2	13	Aric Almirola	654 (–278)
	14	Erik Jones	646 (–286)
	15	Ryan Newman	603 (–329)
1	16	Daniel Suárez	591 (–341)
Official driver's standings

Manufacturers' Championship standings

Pos	Manufacturer	Points
1	Toyota	877
2	Ford	850 (–27)
3	Chevrolet	814 (–63)

- Note: Only the first 16 positions are included for the driver standings.
- . – Driver has clinched a position in the Monster Energy NASCAR Cup Series playoffs.

Previous race: 2019 Consumers Energy 400	Monster Energy NASCAR Cup Series; 2019 season	Next race: 2019 Bojangles' Southern 500
