= Saint Mary's Wilderness =

Wilderness area in Virginia, United States

- IUCN category Ib (wilderness area)
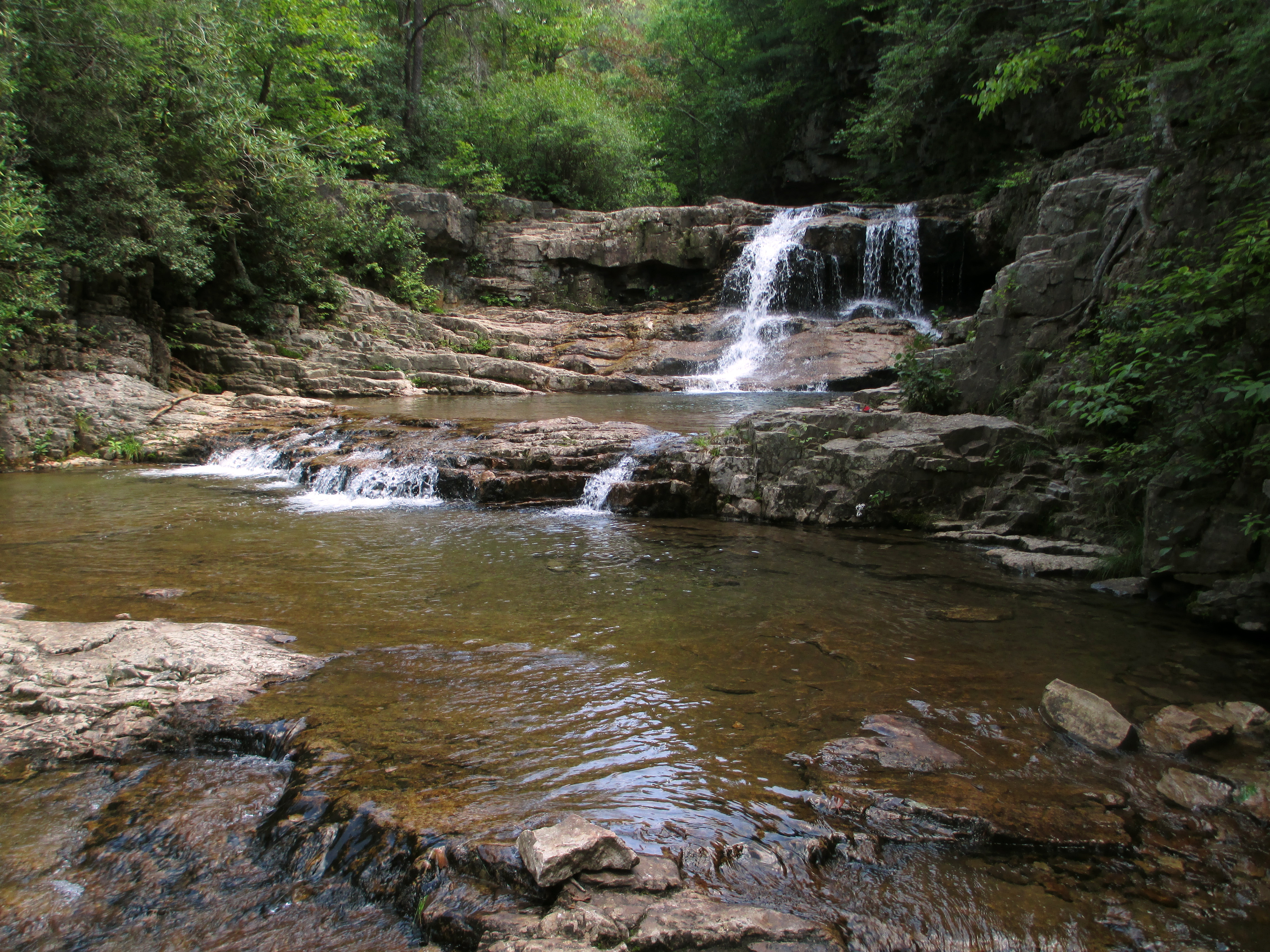
- Saint Mary's Falls

- Location within Virginia
- Location: Augusta, Virginia, United States
- Coordinates: 37°55′29″N 79°08′07″W
- Area: 9,826 acres (39.76 km^{2})
- Elevation: 3,400 ft (1,000 m)
- Established: 1984
- Operator: George Washington and Jefferson National Forests
- Website: George Washington and Jefferson National Forests - Saint Mary's Wilderness Area

Saint Mary's Wilderness is a U.S. Wilderness Area in the George Washington and Jefferson National Forests. The wilderness area is located next to the Blue Ridge Parkway near the Parkway's northern terminus and consists of 9,826 acres (39.76 km^{2}). Saint Mary's Wilderness is the largest Virginia Wilderness on national forest land. Saint Mary's Wilderness ranges in elevation from about 1,780 feet (543 m) to 3,640 feet (1,109 m). The area has about 14 miles (23 km) of hiking trails within or near its boundaries.

Saint Mary's Wilderness includes the drainages of Cellar Hollow, Spy Run, and the upper part of the Saint Mary's River. Each waterway is a tributary of the South River; via the Maury and James rivers, which are part of the Chesapeake Bay watershed.

== History ==
The Saint Mary's River gorge was mined for manganese ore and iron ore from the early 1900s until the mines were abandoned in the 1950s. Scattered remains of the mining operations are still evident. Mine Bank Mountain, a creek, and a trail are all named Mine Bank after the mining operations.

Saint Mary's was designated a Wilderness as a part of the Virginia Wilderness Act of 1984.

== Recreation ==
Saint Mary's Wilderness is particularly popular during summer due to a large number of waterfalls within its boundaries. Fishermen can take native trout from the Saint Mary's River.

There is an extensive network of hiking trails, including:

- Saint Mary's River Trail
- Saint Mary's Gorge Trail
- Mine Bank Creek Trail
- Cellar Mountain Trail

== See also ==
- List of U.S. Wilderness Areas
- Wilderness Act
