= Matt DiBenedetto =

American racing driver (born 1991)

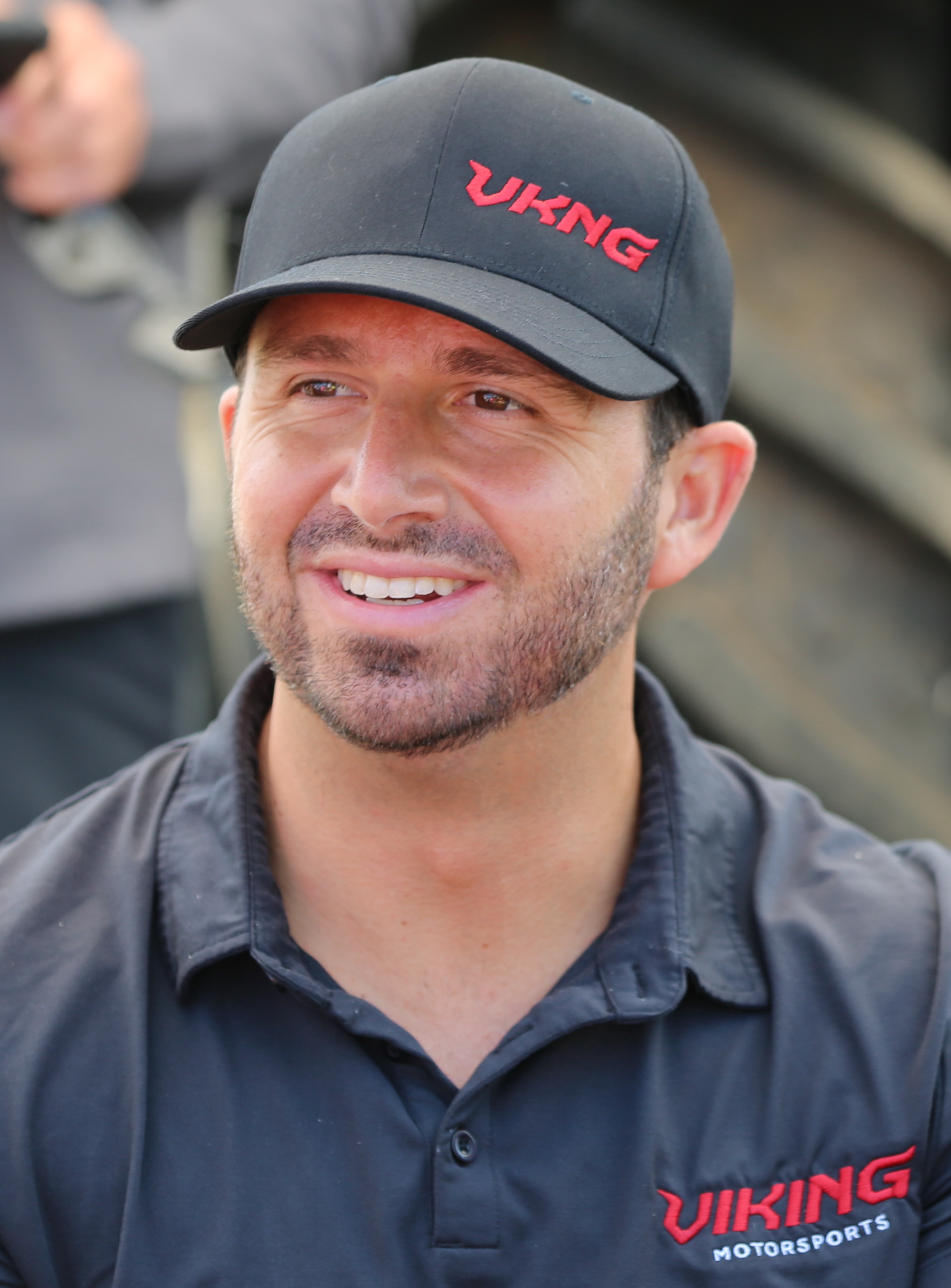
- DiBenedetto at Sonoma Raceway in 2025
- Born: Matthew Guido DiBenedetto; July 27, 1991 (age 35); Nevada City, California, U.S.
- Height: 5 ft 11 in (1.80 m)
- Weight: 205 lb (93 kg)
- Awards: 2007 UARA-Stars Late Model Series Rookie of the Year

NASCAR Cup Series career
- 248 races run over 7 years
- 2021 position: 18th
- Best finish: 13th (2020)
- First race: 2015 CampingWorld.com 500 (Phoenix)
- Last race: 2021 NASCAR Cup Series Championship Race (Phoenix)
Wins	Top tens	Poles
0	31	0

NASCAR O'Reilly Auto Parts Series career
- 129 races run over 10 years
- 2026 position: 52nd
- Best finish: 21st (2014)
- First race: 2009 Kroger On Track for the Cure 250 (Memphis)
- Last race: 2026 Blue Cross NC 300 (Charlotte)
Wins	Top tens	Poles
0	6	0

NASCAR FedEx Freight Truck Series career
- 43 races run over 2 years
- 2023 position: 10th
- Best finish: 10th (2023)
- First race: 2022 NextEra Energy 250 (Daytona)
- Last race: 2023 UNOH 200 (Bristol)
- First win: 2022 Chevrolet Silverado 250 (Talladega)
Wins	Top tens	Poles
1	19	0

ARCA Menards Series career
- 2 races run over 1 year
- Best finish: 62nd (2011)
- First race: 2011 Kentuckiana Ford Dealers ARCA Fall Classic (Salem)
- Last race: 2011 Federated Car Care 200 (Toledo)
Wins	Top tens	Poles
0	1	0

ARCA Menards Series East career
- 20 races run over 3 years
- Best finish: 4th (2011)
- First race: 2009 NASCAR Home Tracks 150 (Greenville-Pickens)
- Last race: 2012 Pork Be Inspired 150 (Iowa)
- First win: 2009 Tri-County 150 (Tri-County)
- Last win: 2011 Army Strong 150 (Bowman Gray)
Wins	Top tens	Poles
3	14	4
- Statistics up to date as of November 7, 2026.

Matthew Guido DiBenedetto (born July 27, 1991) is an American professional stock car racing driver. He last competed part-time in the NASCAR O'Reilly Auto Parts Series, driving the No. 35 Chevrolet Camaro SS for Joey Gase Motorsports with Scott Osteen, and the No. 42 Chevrolet Camaro SS for Young's Motorsports.

DiBenedetto competed full-time in the NASCAR Craftsman Truck Series for two years, which included making the playoffs in 2023. He has previously competed in the NASCAR Cup Series, ARCA Menards Series, and ARCA Menards Series East, as well as late model stocks, and won the track championship at Hickory Motor Speedway in 2004.

== Racing career ==
=== Early career ===
DiBenedetto first showed an interest in auto racing after receiving a Little League trophy around the age of eight. His father, Tony, who raced an Opel Manta in SCCA and IMSA in the late 1970s and early 1980s, noticed he preferred watching automobile racing on television over baseball. DiBenedetto's father knew that another player on his son's little league team was competing in mini-kart racing, so he bought him a used kart, which a young DiBenedetto drove to his first victory. He later moved up to the UARA-Stars series, racing late models. In 2007, DiBenedetto's family sold all their equipment due to financial stress, from then on starting in 2008, Dibenedetto drove for Fat Head Racing Driver Development Program in the UARA-Stars as a teammate to Bubba Wallace, Brennan Poole, and FHR team owner Jamie Yelton. There, he caught the attention of Joe Gibbs Racing, and later ran in the NASCAR Camping World East Series for them.

=== Cup Series ===
==== BK Racing: 2015–2016 ====
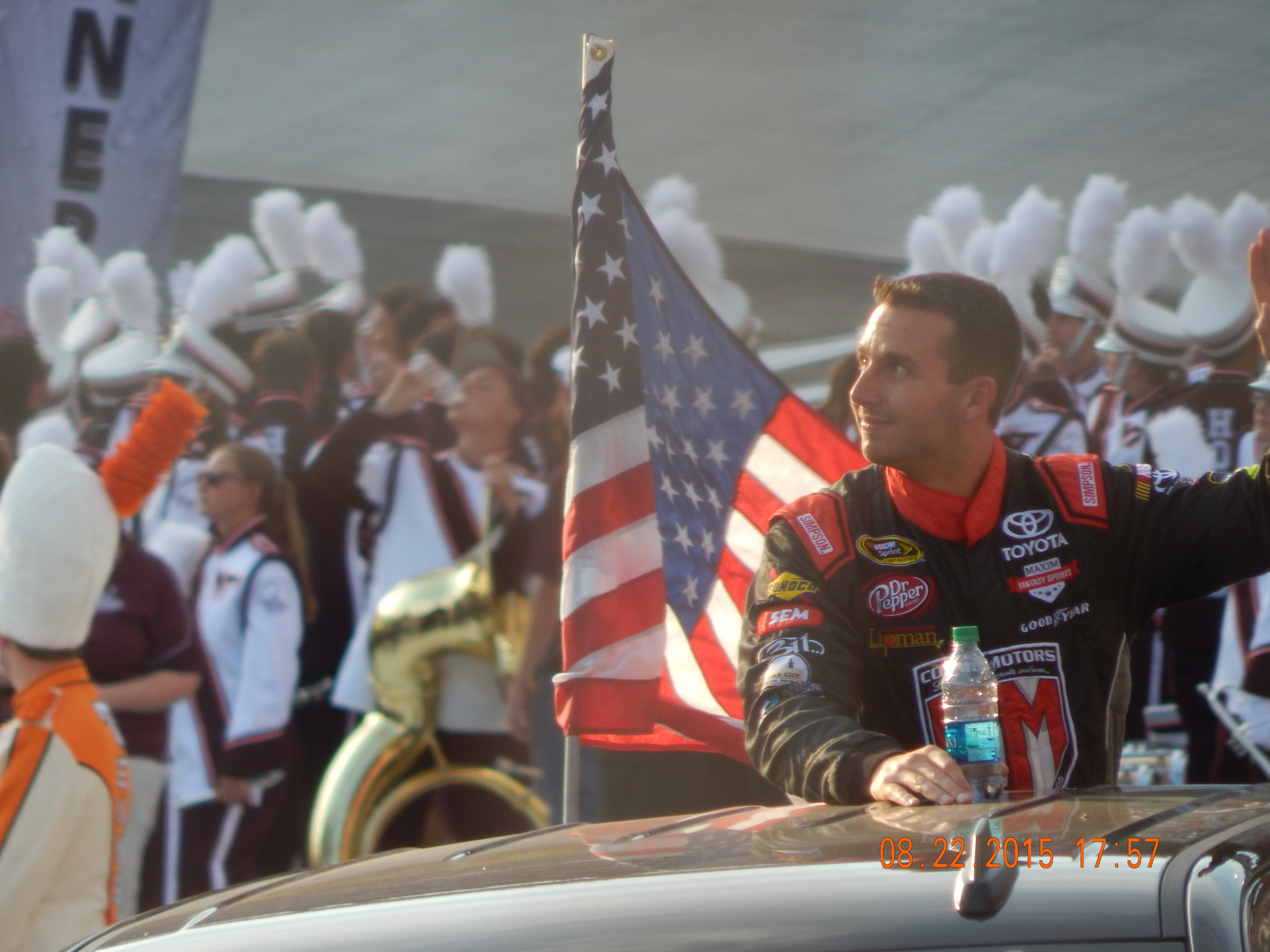
DiBenedetto at the 2015 Irwin Tools Night Race

DiBenedetto moved up to the Sprint Cup Series in 2015. He was originally intended to drive the No. 83 Dustless Blasting and No. 93 Toyotas for BK Racing on a part-time basis; he split the No. 83 during the year with Camping World Truck Series driver Johnny Sauter. After Sauter drove the No. 83 in the Daytona 500, DiBenedetto failed to qualify in his first two attempts at Atlanta and Las Vegas before finally qualifying for his Sprint Cup debut at Phoenix. When Sauter eventually decided not to race at any other Cup race after the Daytona 500, DiBenedetto took over the No. 83 full-time and declared for ROTY contention.

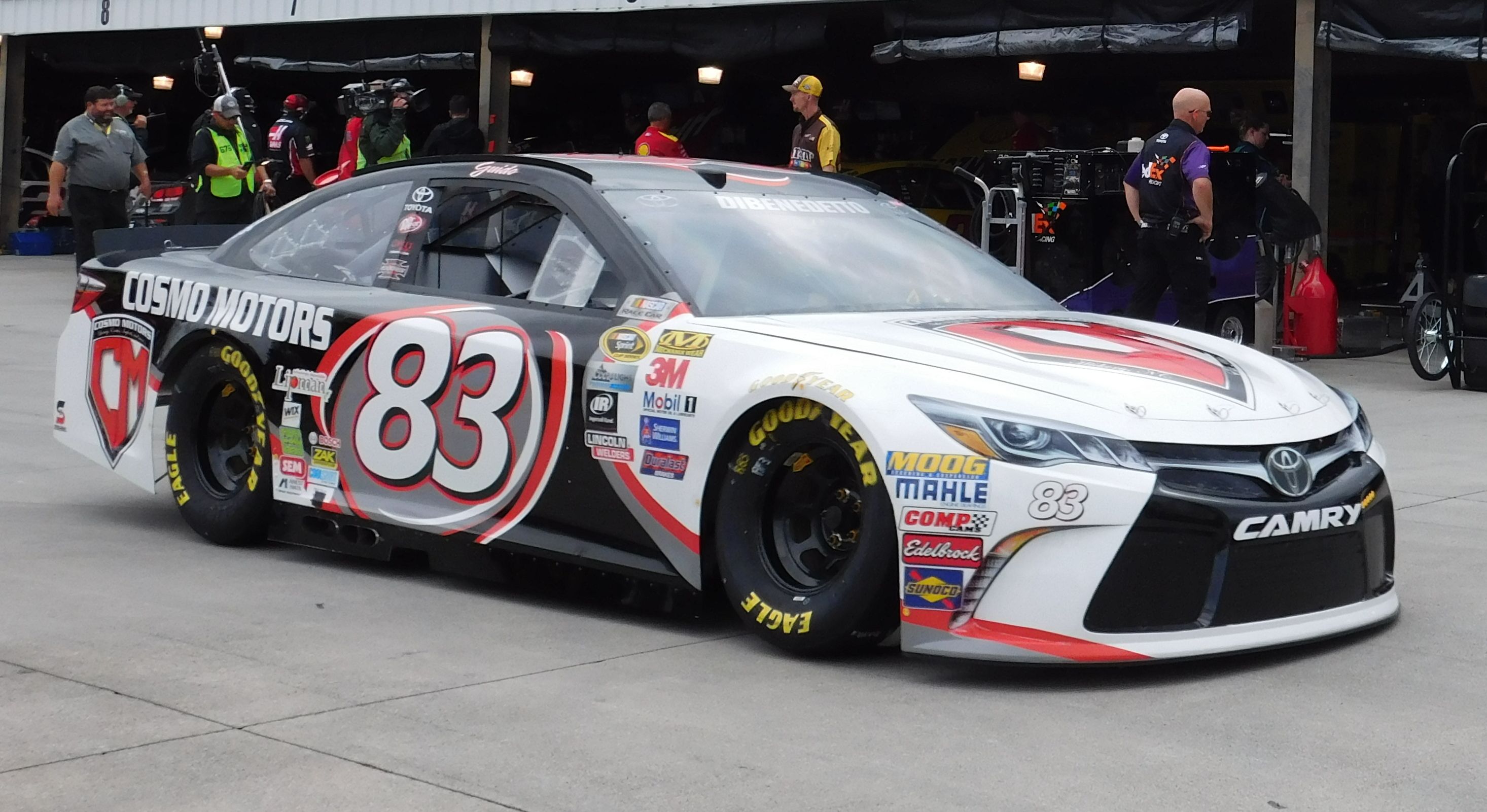
DiBenedetto's No. 83 at Martinsville Speedway in 2016

At Martinsville Speedway during a practice session, DiBenedetto was involved in an incident with three-time NASCAR champion Tony Stewart. The incident occurred when DiBenedetto tried to merge on the track behind Carl Edwards and the gap closed ahead of him. With Stewart fast approaching down the backstretch, DiBenedetto moved up the track in turn three to let Stewart pass. "When I got to (turn) three I didn't want to hold him up, so I just pulled up high and let him go by," DiBenedetto told Foxsports.com. "I got completely out of his way, but that wasn't enough. He tried to wreck me a few times, brake-checking me and flipping me off around the whole track." After the incident, DiBenedetto called Stewart "an arrogant prick".

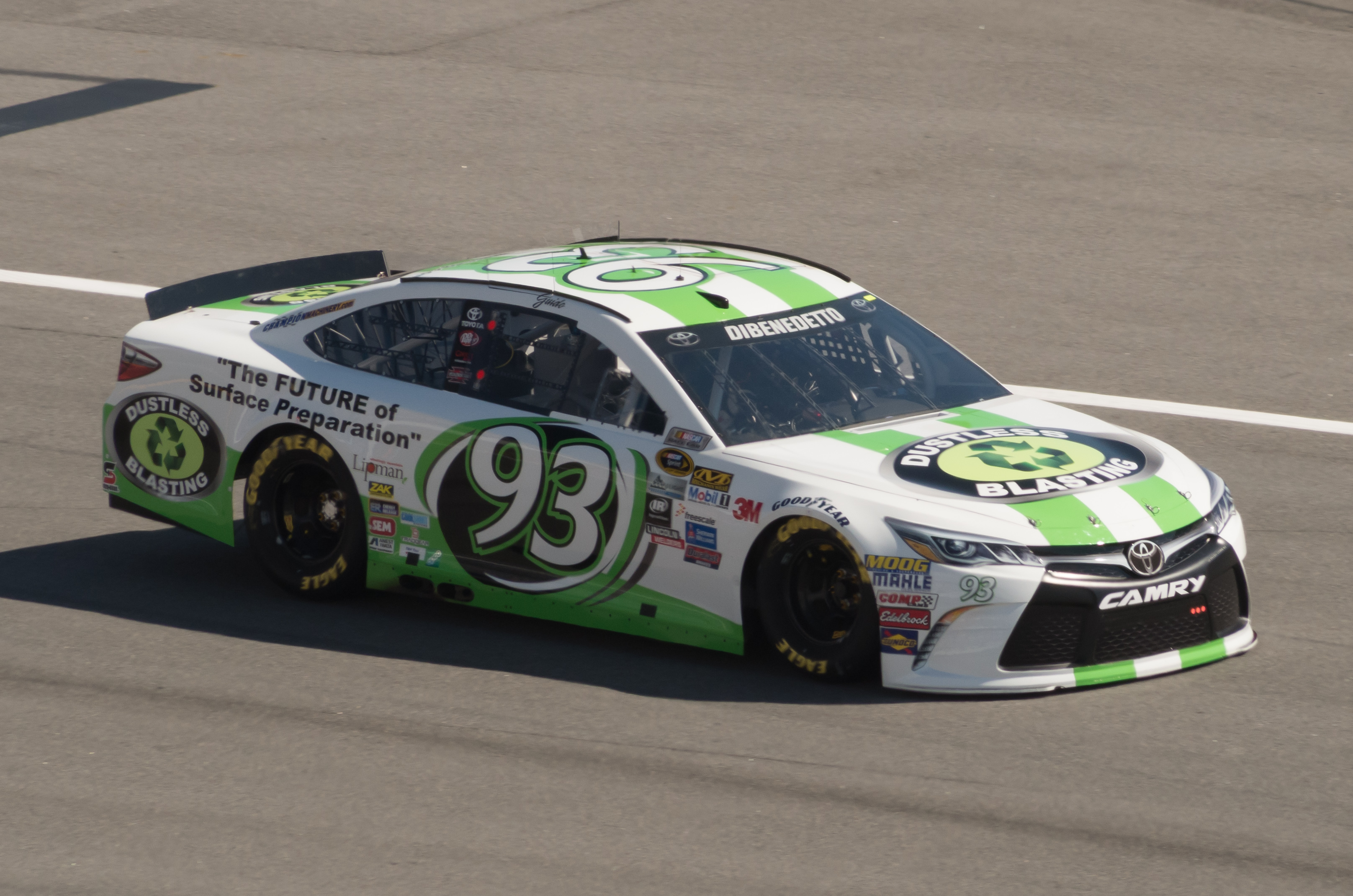
DiBenedetto's 2016 Cup car for BK Racing

DiBenedetto returned full-time with BK Racing in 2016, though he ran the No. 93 for the Daytona 500 since Michael Waltrip was in the No. 83 for the race. At Daytona, DiBenedetto crashed with Chris Buescher on lap 92 in what Buescher called the "hardest hit of his career", though the two were not injured. In the Food City 500 at Bristol Motor Speedway, DiBenedetto finished sixth, a career-best at the time, his first career top ten and the first for BK Racing since Travis Kvapil's eighth-place finish at the 2012 Good Sam Roadside Assistance 500 at Talladega Superspeedway. He returned to the No. 93 for the Federated Auto Parts 400 at Richmond while Dylan Lupton drove the No. 83, while also driving the No. 93 at Talladega's Hellmann's 500 as Jeffrey Earnhardt was in the No. 83. DiBenedetto missed the AAA Texas 500 after suffering a concussion during the previous day's Xfinity Series race and was replaced by Earnhardt. He was cleared to return at the following race in Phoenix. For the season-ending Ford EcoBoost 400 at Homestead, he drove the No. 49 to promote the video game NASCAR Heat Evolution's price change to $49.99.

In 2016, DiBenedetto also made his return in the Xfinity Series, driving the No. 10 Camry for TriStar Motorsports at Fontana, where he started 33rd and finished 40th after starting and parking. DiBenedetto would compete as a start and park driver in various other races throughout the year. At the Fall Texas race, he crashed into the outside fourth turn wall, resulting in a concussion and not racing in the Cup race the following day.

On December 8, 2016, DiBenedetto announced he had parted ways with BK Racing. Two days later he announced that he would drive a single-car effort for Go Fas Racing in 2017. Go Fas is one of the charter teams and as a result, DiBenedetto would make every race in the No. 32 Go Fas Racing Ford Fusion.

==== Go Fas Racing: 2017–2018 ====
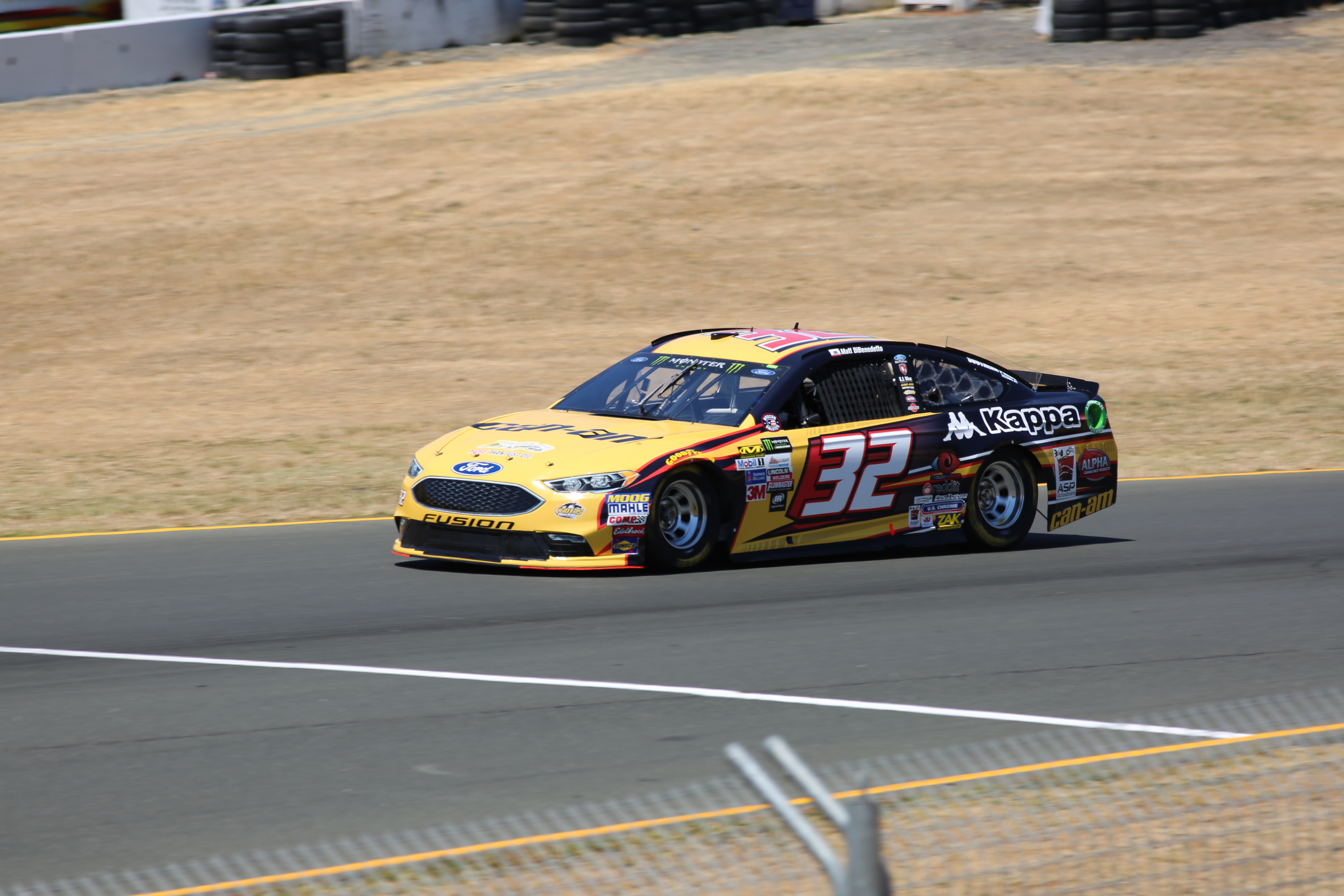
DiBenedetto in the No. 32 at the 2017 Toyota/Save Mart 350

In the 2017 Daytona 500, his first for Go Fas, DiBenedetto finished 9th for his second career top 10. Statistically, DiBenedetto has been Go Fas Racing's best driver since co-owner Frank Stoddard founded the team in 2011, with him picking up several top twenty and top thirty finishes. DiBenedetto had a great race in the 2017 Food City 500 when he picked up a top twenty finish, his best finish since Daytona. At the Monster Energy Open leading up to the All-Star Race, DiBenedetto drove a Reddit-sponsored car; he learned of the site when driver Josh Wise was voted into the 2014 All-Star Race by the community, who nearly voted DiBenedetto into the 2016 race. The community then repeated their near-feat by having another close call in the 2017 Monster Energy NASCAR All-Star Race. After the campaign, DiBenedetto remained an active member of the community, interacting with its users in the NASCAR subreddit regularly.

At the 2017 Brickyard 400, DiBenedetto qualified near the back of the field. Despite this, he managed to avoid the late-race melee to pick up another top-ten finish for the No. 32, finishing 8th. Soon after the race, DiBenedetto, crew chief Gene Nead, and Go Fas extended their contract to the 2018 season, allowing DiBenedetto to remain in the No. 32 for 2018. However, Nead left for personal reasons in late February.

Before the spring ISM race, DiBenedetto reached out on Twitter that his team had no sponsors for that race and needed a last-minute sponsor. Denny Hamlin, Kevin Harvick and Darrell Waltrip began to donate money to fund a sponsor, and the team later received Zynga Poker sponsorship. Go Fas eventually launched #TeamBurrito, a program that allows fans to encourage businesses to sponsor the No. 32 car in exchange for various rewards. Later that season, in July, at Daytona, DiBenedetto drove the No. 32 Zynga Poker Ford Fusion to another top ten finish, this time 7th, for the team's best finish.

On September 7, 2018, DiBenedetto announced that he would not be returning to Go Fas Racing in 2019. On October 10, it was announced that DiBenedetto signed a two-year contract with Leavine Family Racing to drive the No. 95 Toyota Camry starting in 2019. The deal, which was a one-year contract with a possible extension, came after LFR failed to extend Kasey Kahne and after a deal with Daniel Hemric fell through to drive the No. 95 car.

==== Leavine Family Racing: 2019 ====
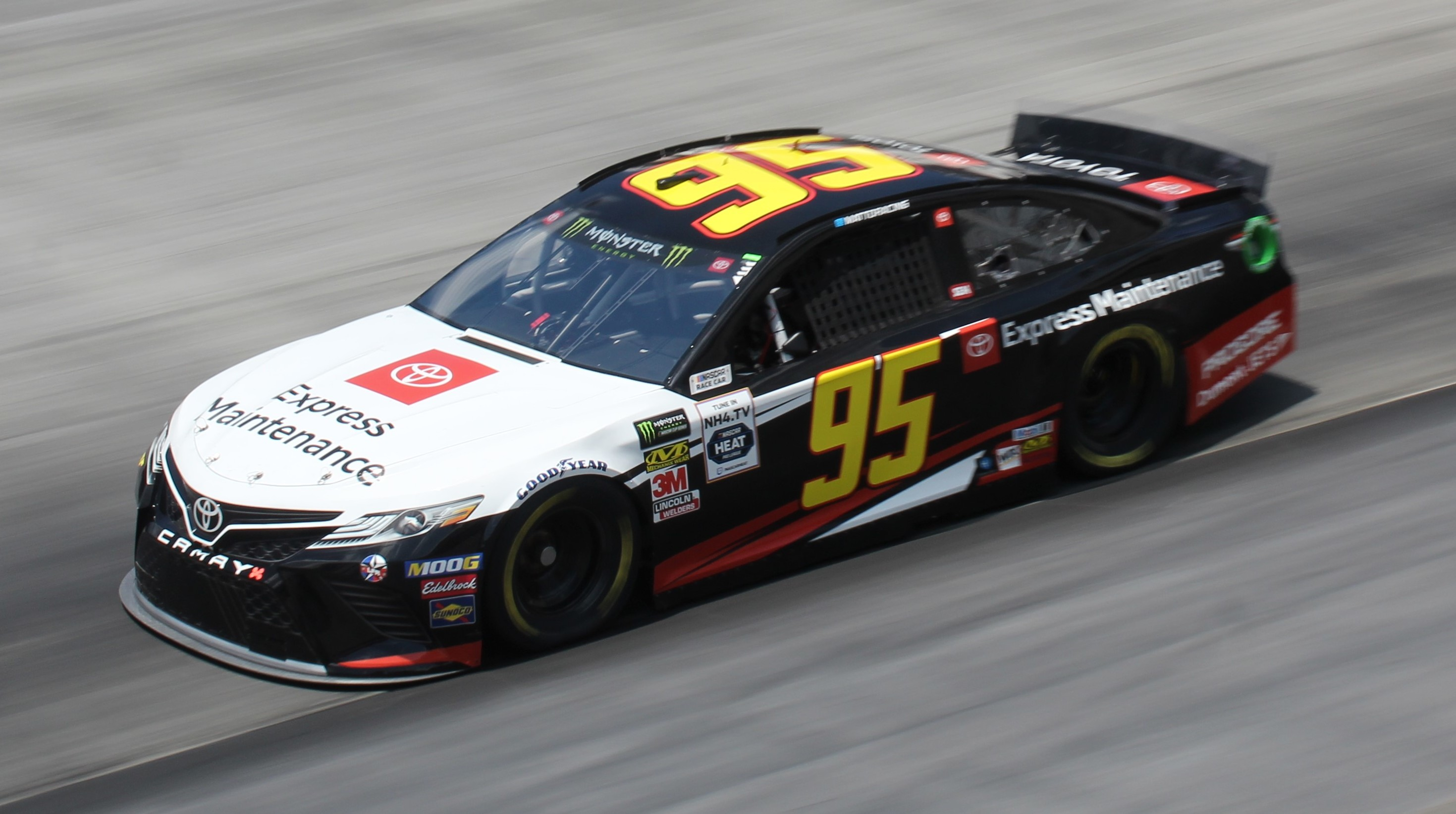
DiBenedetto's No. 95 car during the 2019 Bass Pro Shops NRA Night Race

In his first race with Leavine Family Racing, DiBenedetto nearly pulled off the victory at the 2019 Daytona 500. DiBenedetto took the lead midway in the race and led a race-high 49 laps before being collected in the Big One with less than fifteen laps to go.

For Sonoma Raceway's Toyota/Save Mart 350, DiBenedetto drove a Darrell Waltrip tribute scheme resembling his 1974 car; the race was Waltrip's final as a commentator for Fox NASCAR before his retirement. In the race, DiBenedetto pitted off sequence, completing his stops before the two stages and again with 25 laps remaining to score a fourth-place finish.

On August 15, 2019, DiBenedetto announced via Twitter that Leavine Family Racing had informed him that he would be dropped from the team following the 2019 season. At the time of the announcement, DiBenedetto stood 23rd in the standings. Two days after the announcement, DiBenedetto led 93 laps at the Bristol Night Race, and appeared late in the final stage that he would finally get his first career win, but damage after contact with Ryan Newman would cause him to lose the position to Denny Hamlin with eleven laps to go. DiBenedetto would go on to earn a career-best second-place finish. DiBenedetto scored zero wins, three top-fives, seven top-tens, led 152 laps, had an average finish of 18.3, and finished 22nd in the standings, all of which were career highs up to that point for DiBenedetto.

==== Wood Brothers Racing: 2020–2021 ====
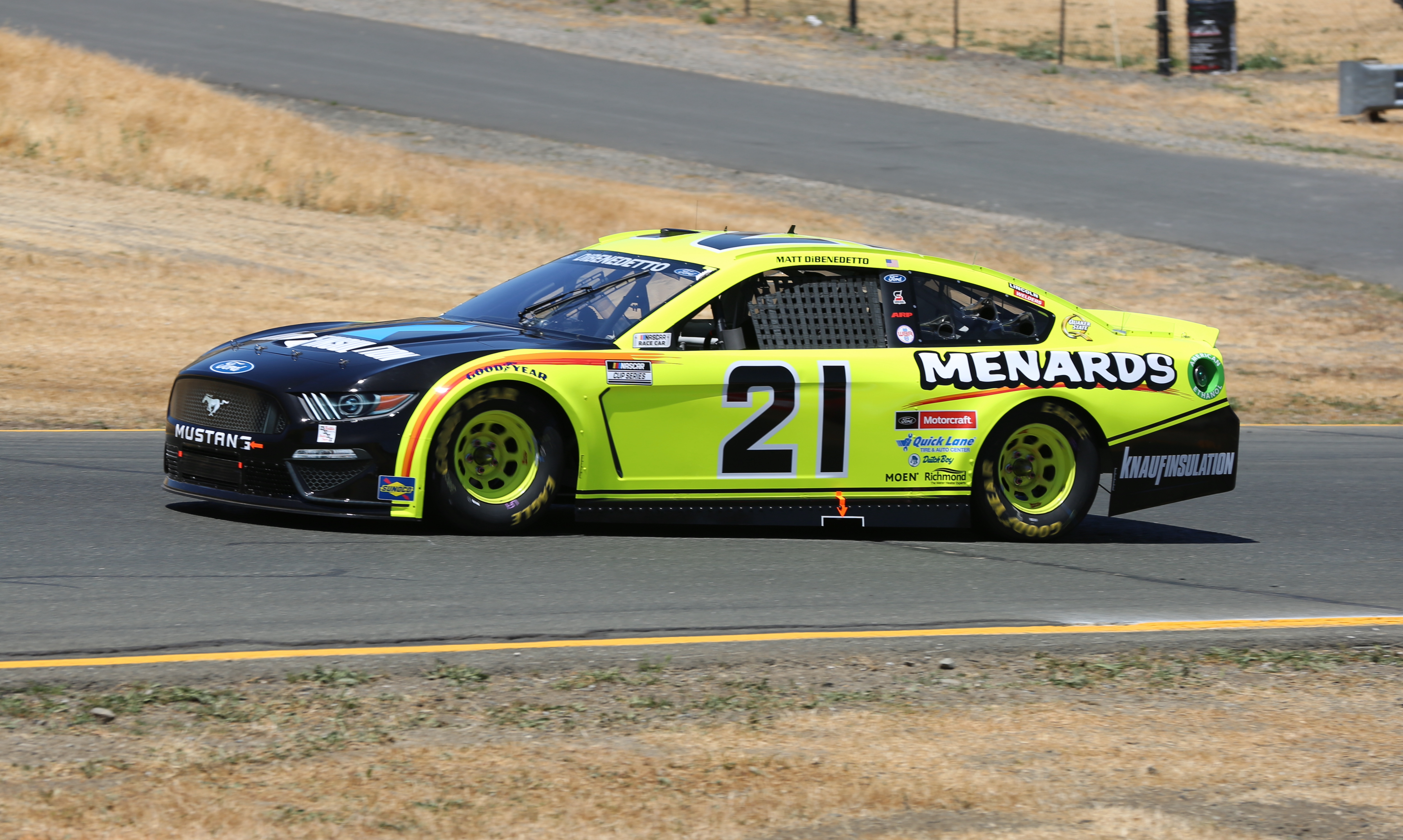
DiBenedetto's No. 21 car at Sonoma Raceway in 2021

On September 10, 2019, Wood Brothers Racing signed DiBenedetto to drive for the No. 21 Ford full-time for the 2020 season, following Paul Menard's announcement that he will retire from full-time racing after the 2019 season. DiBenedetto started the season with a nineteenth place finish at the 2020 Daytona 500, but he rebounded a week later to tie a career-best second-place finish at Las Vegas. In the later weeks of the regular season, DiBenedetto battled with seven-time Cup champion Jimmie Johnson and William Byron for the final spots in the playoffs. DiBenedetto would ultimately qualify for his first playoffs when he finished twelfth in the regular-season finale at Daytona and edged out Johnson for the sixteenth and last seed by six points. He was eliminated following the third race of the opening round at Bristol.

DiBenedetto tied his career-best finish of second the following week at Las Vegas for the third time in his career and the second time in a row at the track; this time to Kurt Busch. The next week at Talladega, DiBenedetto would run in the top-fifteen for the majority of the day, and made heavy gambles on fuel mileage to get to the top five for most of the final ten laps, and would make the pass on Chase Elliott to get the race lead with two laps to go, before Bubba Wallace would trigger the Big One. On the final restart, DiBenedetto would hold his line and maintain the lead until turn 4 on the final lap, when a block he would make on William Byron would give Denny Hamlin enough room to pass him on the bottom lane, with Hamlin winning over DiBenedetto by only twenty-three one-thousandths of a second (.023). DiBenedetto would be penalized later for forcing Byron below the yellow-line, relegating him to a 21st-place finish. He ended his first season with the Wood Brothers thirteenth in the final points standings with a career-high 11 top tens.

DiBenedetto returned to the Wood Brothers in 2021 in what would be his final season with the team, as Harrison Burton would take over the No. 21 the following year. He missed the Playoffs and finished eighteenth in the final standings, with a season-high finish of fourth at Kansas.

=== Craftsman Truck Series ===
==== Rackley W.A.R.: 2022–2023 ====
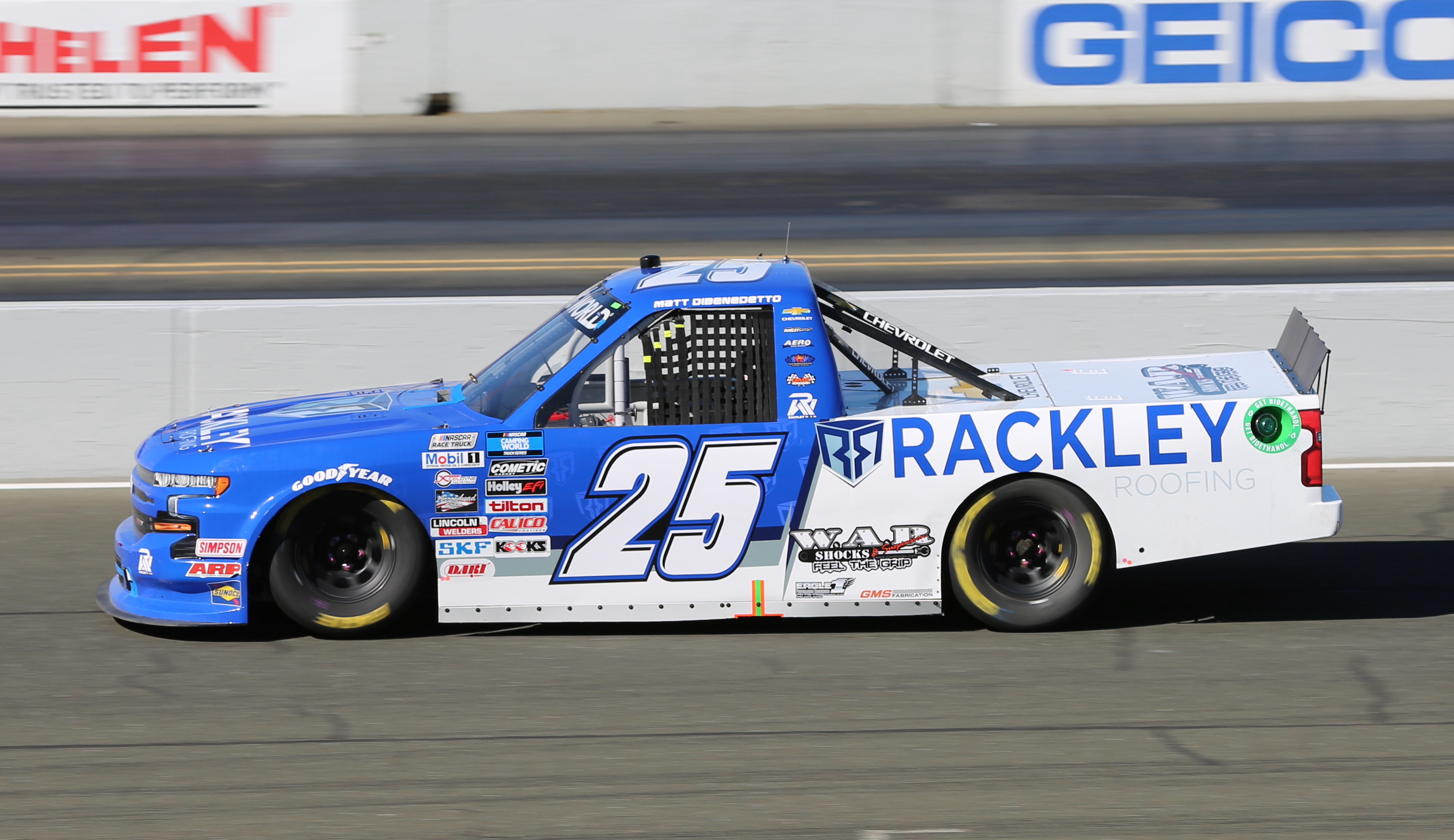
DiBenedetto's No. 25 truck at Sonoma Raceway in 2022

On January 6, 2022, Rackley W.A.R. announced that DiBenedetto would drive the No. 25 full-time in the NASCAR Camping World Truck Series for 2022.

At the 2022 NextEra Energy 250 at Daytona, in only his first Truck start, DiBenedetto dodged many wrecks en route to a tenth-place finish, the second one ever for Rackley W.A.R. He would follow with a sixth-place finish at the 2022 Victoria's Voice Foundation 200 at Las Vegas. It was his second top-ten in his second start, and the best finish ever for Rackley W.A.R. in the Truck series.

DiBenedetto struggled the next few weeks, falling out of the top-ten in points with a 30th place at Atlanta Motor Speedway after hitting the wall on the first lap, falling eleven laps down due to damage. He scored a 31st-place finish the next week after running top-ten late in the race before a rear gear failure ended it at Circuit of the Americas followed by a fifteenth-place run at Martinsville Speedway then a 35th-place finish at the 2022 Pinty's Truck Race on Dirt at Bristol Motor Speedway after getting stuck together with Austin Wayne Self's truck. He fell two laps down with a flat tire during the 2022 Dead On Tools 200 at Darlington Raceway but got back on the lead lap, scoring tenth before he was sent back to 11th when Matt Crafton's penalty was appealed. He finished 7th at Kansas Speedway, followed by a 10th at Texas Motor Speedway, scoring his fourth top-ten of the season. He would go on to score two more top-ten finishes at Gateway International Raceway and Sonoma Raceway. In the 2022 Rackley Roofing 200 at Nashville Superspeedway, DiBenedetto was running in the top-ten when ThorSport Racing driver Ty Majeski took Matt and two other trucks four wide coming into the third turn causing him and the two other trucks to crash ending DiBenedetto's day and putting him in a must-win to make the playoffs. DiBenedetto, after being interviewed, was unhappy and said, "Some of these guys race with such disrespect." On July 23, Rackley W.A.R. announced that DiBenedetto would return to the No. 25 for the 2023 season. On October 1, DiBenedetto achieved his first national series win in the 2022 Chevrolet Silverado 250 at Talladega Superspeedway. DiBenedetto would finish the year thirteenth in the standings.

DiBenedetto started off the 2023 season getting caught up in two wrecks at the 2023 NextEra Energy 250 at Daytona, finishing twentieth, followed by a twelfth-place finish in the 2023 Victoria's Voice Foundation 200 at Las Vegas Motor Speedway. He would rebound at Atlanta Motor Speedway in the 2023 Fr8 208 with sixth but would struggle, finishing in the top-ten only twice in the next six races. He would then go on to finish in the top-ten six times in a row, starting at the 2023 Tyson 250 at North Wilkesboro Speedway. Despite finishing seventeenth in the 2023 Worldwide Express 250 at Richmond Raceway, DiBenedetto was able to qualify for the 2023 Truck Series Playoffs. On August 30, it was announced that DiBenedetto would be leaving Rackley W.A.R. after the 2023 season. DiBenedetto was eliminated from the playoffs at Kansas. After the Bristol night race, Rackley W.A.R. removed DiBenedetto from the team and announced plans for a replacement driver for the final three races of the season. Prior to this announcement, DiBenedetto had stated that he was "exploring all options in all series."

=== O'Reilly Auto Parts Series ===
==== Joe Gibbs Racing: 2009–2010 ====
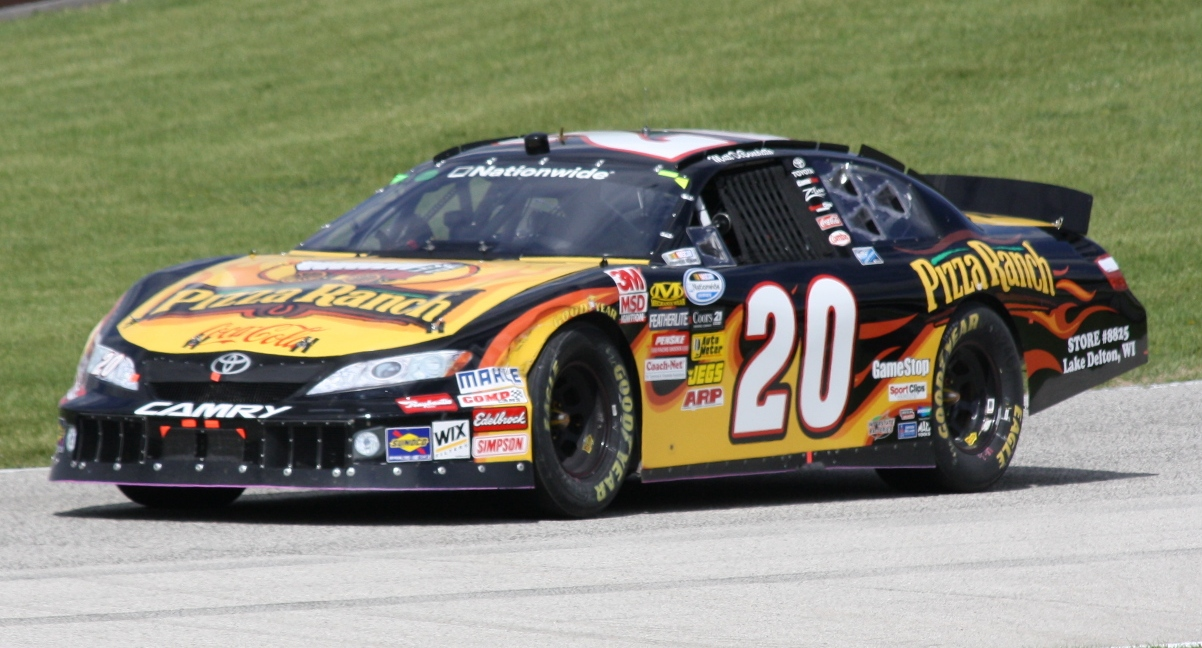
2010 Nationwide car at Road America

DiBenedetto made his NASCAR Nationwide Series debut in 2009 at the Memphis Motorsports Park and drove the No. 20 Pizza Ranch-sponsored Toyota for Joe Gibbs Racing. He raced part-time in the No. 20 car in 2010.

DiBenedetto's first race of 2010 came at Nashville Speedway. DiBenedetto had a solid car and ran well all night. Eventually scoring a tenth-place finish. His next race came at Road America. While running eleventh, he had an axle problem due to running over the curbs too hard, and that led to him falling many laps down. DiBenedetto ran six races for Joe Gibbs in 2010, with two top-ten finishes.

==== Multiple teams: 2011–2014 ====
After being forced out of K&N Pro Series East team X Team Racing due to lack of sponsorship, DiBenedetto then joined The Motorsports Group midway through 2012 and ran as a start and park driver for seven races, finishing 79th in points.

In 2013, DiBenedetto joined Vision Racing to drive the No. 37 car part-time in the Nationwide Series and also started and parked the few races he was in. Dibenedetto later looked back at the start-and-park time as valuable for the seat time it gave him, which paid off later in his career.

During the 2014 season's Subway Firecracker 250 at Daytona, DiBenedetto replaced Jeffrey Earnhardt in the No. 4 JD Motorsports Chevy during the first caution due to Earnhardt suffering a fractured collarbone in a motorcycle accident during the week. For the second race he joined The Motorsports Group, where he start-and-parked the No. 46 Chevrolet for twelve races and raced the rest with the No. 40. He scored two top-fifteen place finishes at Road America and Mid-Ohio. DiBenedetto finished a career-high 21st in points.

==== Return to JGR: 2019 ====
Nine years after his last start in the Xfinity series with JGR, DiBenedetto returned to the team in August 2019 for the Road America race. He led the most laps and was in second position when he spun off the track on the final lap at the final corner of the race.

==== RSS Racing/Viking Motorsports: 2024 ====
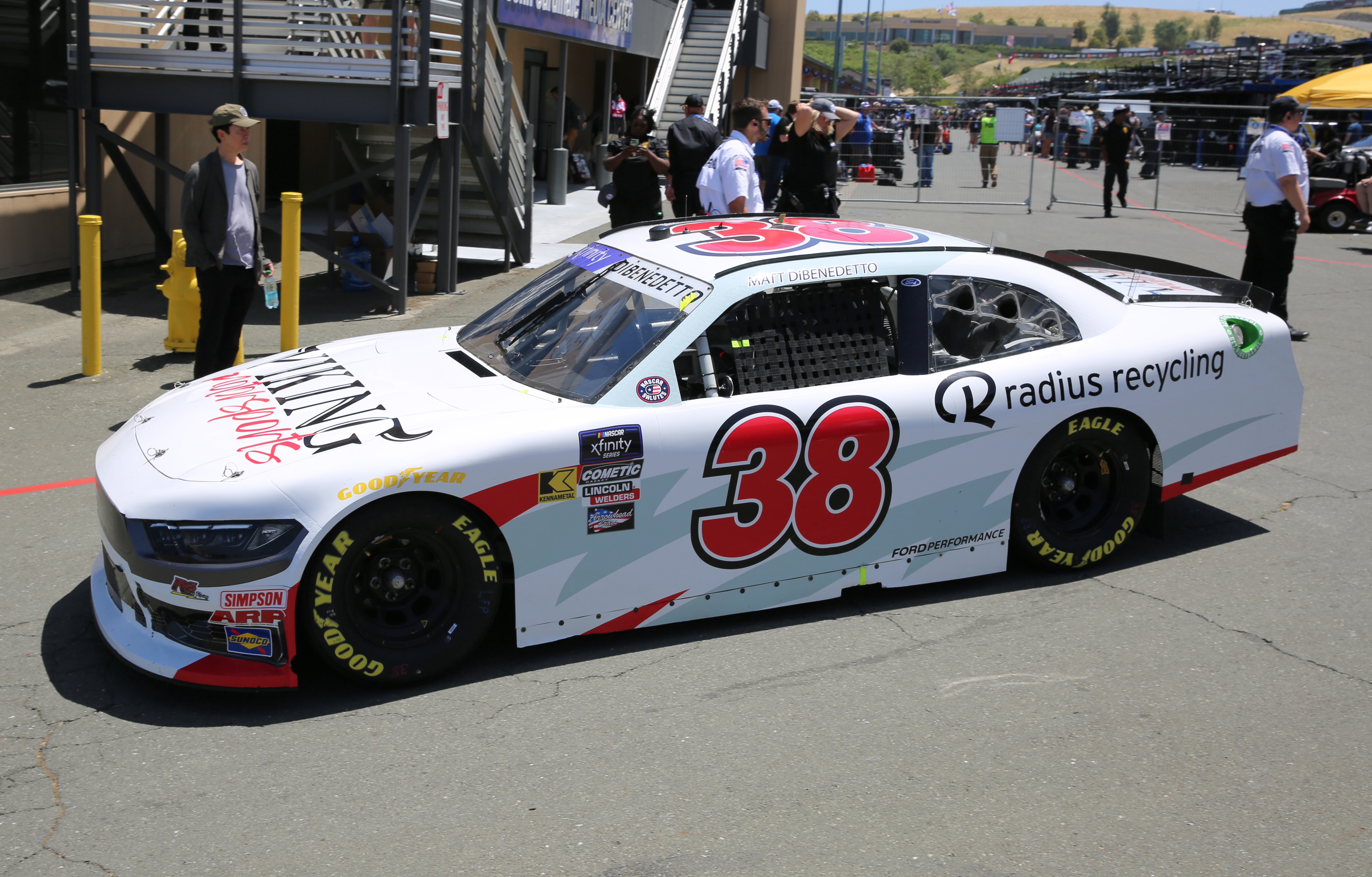
DiBenedetto's No. 38 car at Sonoma Raceway in 2024

On March 20, 2024, it was announced that DiBenedetto would drive for Viking Motorsports for five races through the No. 38 entry with RSS Racing, starting at Richmond Raceway. He would finish eighteenth at Richmond followed by a 21st-place run at Martinsville, twentieth at Texas, and eighth at Talladega. On May 1, 2024, it was revealed that DiBenedetto would continue to be the team's primary driver for the remainder of the season. However, a few days later, it was announced that DiBenedetto would run the rest of the season with the team. DiBenedetto scored two more top-ten finishes both being seventh place runs at the 2024 Hy-Vee PERKS 250 at Iowa Speedway and the 2024 Cabo Wabo 250 at Michigan. He finished the season 26th in points.

==== Viking Motorsports: 2025 ====
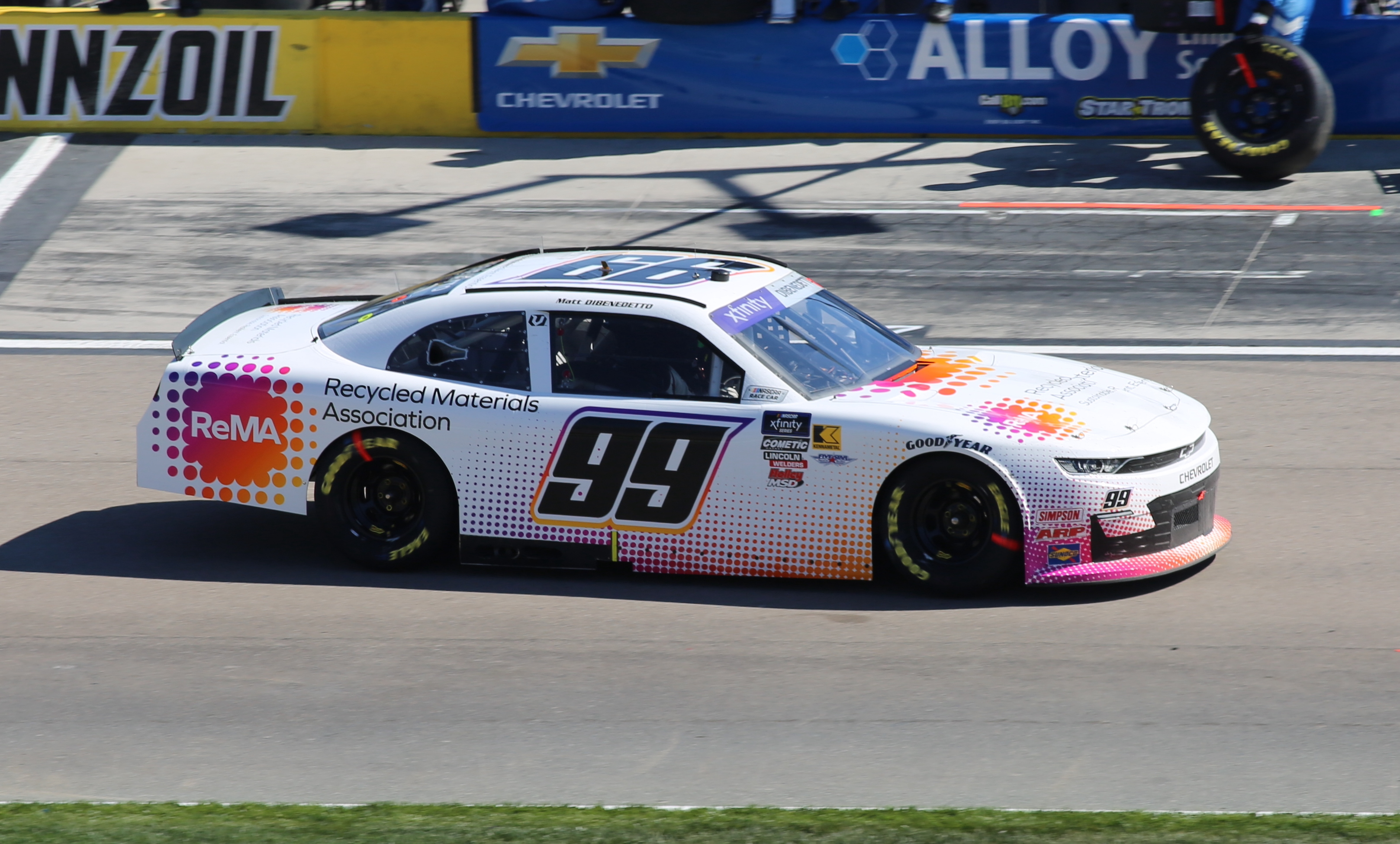
DiBenedetto's No. 99 car at Las Vegas Motor Speedway in 2025

On December 13, 2024, Viking Motorsports announced that they would be switching from Ford to Chevrolet, officially ending their partnership with RSS Racing. It was later announced that DiBenedetto would return to the team to drive the newly renumbered No. 99 full-time. DiBenedetto started season with back-to-back top-fifteens in the first two races at the 2025 United Rentals 300 and the 2025 Bennett Transportation & Logistics 250. DiBenedetto got his career best result in the NASCAR Xfinity Series at the 2025 Ag-Pro 300 at Talladega, finishing fifth. On October 13, 2025, Viking Motorsports announced they had parted ways with DiBenedetto, effective immediately, with Connor Mosack taking over the ride for the remainder of the season.

==== Joey Gase Motorsports/Young's Motorsports: 2026 ====
DiBenedetto's No. 42 car at Charlotte Motor Speedway in 2026.

On March 19, 2026, it was announced that DiBenedetto would compete part-time in the 2026 NASCAR O'Reilly Auto Parts Series beginning at Darlington for Joey Gase Motorsports with Scott Osteen. He failed to qualify for the event. On September 2, it was announced that he would drive at Las Vegas and Charlotte for Young's Motorsports.

== Personal life ==
DiBenedetto was born in Nevada City, California, to parents Sandy and Tony DiBenedetto, and raised in Grass Valley, California. He has three siblings, Austin, Katie, and Kelley. Austin is a member of the United States Air Force.

In 2015, DiBenedetto married his childhood friend, Taylor Carswell. They currently reside in Hickory, North Carolina. They own a dog named Brian.

In 2018, he made a cameo in the television series Lethal Weapon (S2, E13) as a character named Carl Edwards, which DiBenedetto noted was coincidental and not a nod to the driver of the same name.

In 2021, DiBenedetto was baptized by fellow Cup Series driver Michael McDowell.

== Motorsports career results ==
=== NASCAR ===
(key) (Bold – Pole position awarded by qualifying time. Italics – Pole position earned by points standings or practice time. * – Most laps led. ** – All laps led.)

==== Cup Series ====
NASCAR Cup Series results
Year	Team	No.	Make	1	2	3	4	5	6	7	8	9	10	11	12	13	14	15	16	17	18	19	20	21	22	23	24	25	26	27	28	29	30	31	32	33	34	35	36	NCSC	Pts	Ref
2015	BK Racing	83	Toyota	DAY	ATL; DNQ	LVS; DNQ	PHO; 35	CAL; 42	MAR; 31	TEX; 34	BRI; 21	RCH; 37	TAL; 18	KAN; 25	CLT; 34	DOV; 32	POC; 32	MCH; 39	SON; 29	DAY; 26	KEN; 42	NHA; 35	IND; 32	POC; 29	GLN; 26	MCH; 30	BRI; 33	DAR; 25	RCH; 36	CHI; 39	NHA; 30	DOV; 34	CLT; 29	KAN; 30	TAL; 40	MAR; 30	TEX; 35	PHO; 28	HOM; 37	35th	399	
2016	BK Racing	93	Toyota	DAY; 40																									RCH; 37						TAL; 27	MAR; 32				35th	386	
2016	BK Racing	83	Toyota		ATL; 29	LVS; 31	PHO; 20	CAL; 27	MAR; 29	TEX; 34	BRI; 6	RCH; 30	TAL; 36	KAN; 30	DOV; 40	CLT; 32	POC; 40	MCH; 34	SON; 31	DAY; 33	KEN; 38	NHA; 31	IND; 40	POC; 28	GLN; 34	BRI; 17	MCH; 32	DAR; 26		CHI; 30	NHA; 28	DOV; 27	CLT; 25	KAN; 24			TEX; INQ^{†}	PHO; 25		35th	386	
2016	BK Racing	49	Toyota																																				HOM; 27	35th	386	
2017	Go Fas Racing	32	Ford	DAY; 9	ATL; 28	LVS; 26	PHO; 29	CAL; 29	MAR; 35	TEX; 31	BRI; 19	RCH; 28	TAL; 18	KAN; 32	CLT; 37	DOV; 29	POC; 32	MCH; 28	SON; 23	DAY; 13	KEN; 25	NHA; 30	IND; 8	POC; 37	GLN; 28	MCH; 26	BRI; 26	DAR; 27	RCH; 31	CHI; 31	NHA; 31	DOV; 31	CLT; 23	TAL; 31	KAN; 22	MAR; 39	TEX; 25	PHO; 27	HOM; 30	32nd	363	
2018	Go Fas Racing	32	Ford	DAY; 27	ATL; 31	LVS; 22	PHO; 25	CAL; 31	MAR; 32	TEX; 16	BRI; 21	RCH; 16	TAL; 19	DOV; 29	KAN; 22	CLT; 37	POC; 37	MCH; 36	SON; 17	CHI; 29	DAY; 7	KEN; 37	NHA; 28	POC; 27	GLN; 33	MCH; 24	BRI; 22	DAR; 38	IND; 36	LVS; 24	RCH; 34	ROV; 13	DOV; 27	TAL; 30	KAN; 23	MAR; 36	TEX; 38	PHO; 21	HOM; 26	29th	368	
2019	Leavine Family Racing	95	Toyota	DAY; 28*	ATL; 26	LVS; 21	PHO; 28	CAL; 18	MAR; 20	TEX; 26	BRI; 12	RCH; 24	TAL; 31	DOV; 20	KAN; 36	CLT; 39	POC; 17	MCH; 21	SON; 4	CHI; 27	DAY; 8	KEN; 16	NHA; 5	POC; 17	GLN; 6	MCH; 20	BRI; 2*	DAR; 8	IND; 18	LVS; 21	RCH; 14	ROV; 11	DOV; 7	TAL; 30	KAN; 15	MAR; 16	TEX; 14	PHO; 13	HOM; 20	22nd	699	
2020	Wood Brothers Racing	21	Ford	DAY; 19	LVS; 2	CAL; 13	PHO; 13	DAR; 14	DAR; 9	CLT; 17	CLT; 15	BRI; 31	ATL; 25	MAR; 7	HOM; 14	TAL; 26	POC; 13	POC; 6	IND; 19	KEN; 3	TEX; 17	KAN; 36	NHA; 6	MCH; 15	MCH; 7	DRC; 15	DOV; 20	DOV; 17	DAY; 12	DAR; 21	RCH; 17	BRI; 19	LVS; 2	TAL; 21	ROV; 22	KAN; 12	TEX; 8	MAR; 10	PHO; 8	13th	2249	
2021	Wood Brothers Racing	21	Ford	DAY; 33	DRC; 37	HOM; 28	LVS; 16	PHO; 14	ATL; 11	BRD; 13	MAR; 12	RCH; 9	TAL; 5	KAN; 4	DAR; 19	DOV; 24	COA; 23	CLT; 18	SON; 23	NSH; 24	POC; 32	POC; 18	ROA; 10	ATL; 9	NHA; 11	GLN; 11	IRC; 5	MCH; 6	DAY; 25	DAR; 23	RCH; 18	BRI; 10	LVS; 12	TAL; 35	ROV; 6	TEX; 13	KAN; 23	MAR; 15	PHO; 12	18th	775	
^{†} – Replaced by Jeffrey Earnhardt

===== Daytona 500 =====
Year	Team	Manufacturer	Start	Finish
2016	BK Racing	Toyota	20	40
2017	Go Fas Racing	Ford	25	9
2018	Go Fas Racing	Ford	36	27
2019	Leavine Family Racing	Toyota	9	28*
2020	Wood Brothers Racing	Ford	16	19
2021	Wood Brothers Racing	Ford	23	33

==== O'Reilly Auto Parts Series ====
NASCAR O'Reilly Auto Parts Series results
Year	Team	No.	Make	1	2	3	4	5	6	7	8	9	10	11	12	13	14	15	16	17	18	19	20	21	22	23	24	25	26	27	28	29	30	31	32	33	34	35	NOAPSC	Pts	Ref
2009	Joe Gibbs Racing	20	Toyota	DAY	CAL	LVS	BRI	TEX	NSH	PHO	TAL	RCH	DAR	CLT	DOV	NSH	KEN	MLW	NHA	DAY	CHI	GTW	IRP	IOW	GLN	MCH	BRI	CGV	ATL	RCH	DOV	KAN	CAL	CLT	MEM; 14	TEX	PHO	HOM	124th	121	
2010	Joe Gibbs Racing	20	Toyota	DAY	CAL	LVS	BRI	NSH	PHO	TEX	TAL	RCH	DAR	DOV	CLT	NSH; 10	KEN	ROA; 29	NHA	DAY	CHI	GTW; 29	IRP; 31	IOW; 9	GLN	MCH	BRI	CGV	ATL	RCH	DOV	KAN	CAL	CLT	GTY; 24	TEX	PHO	HOM	64th	585	
2012	The Motorsports Group	46	Chevy	DAY	PHO	LVS	BRI	CAL	TEX	RCH	TAL	DAR	IOW	CLT	DOV; 42									GLN; 41															79th	21	
2012	The Motorsports Group	47	Chevy													MCH; 41	ROA; 41	KEN	DAY	NHA	CHI	IND	IOW; 41		CGV; 40	BRI	ATL	RCH	CHI	KEN; 41	DOV	CLT	KAN	TEX	PHO	HOM			79th	21	
2013	Vision Racing	37	Dodge	DAY	PHO	LVS	BRI	CAL	TEX	RCH	TAL	DAR	CLT; DNQ	DOV; 39	IOW	MCH	ROA	KEN	DAY	NHA	CHI; 39	IND; DNQ	IOW	GLN	MOH	BRI; 37	ATL; 33	RCH; 37	CHI										67th	31	
2013	The Motorsports Group	46	Chevy																											KEN; 36	DOV	KAN	CLT	TEX	PHO	HOM			67th	31	
2014	Vision Racing	37	Dodge	DAY; DNQ																																			21st	369	
2014	The Motorsports Group	46	Chevy		PHO; 38	LVS; 38	BRI; 39	CAL; 37	TEX; 39	DAR; 38	RCH; 37	TAL; 39			DOV; 39	MCH; DNQ		KEN; 40	DAY; DNQ	NHA; 40		IND; 39																	21st	369	
2014	The Motorsports Group	40	Chevy										IOW; 25	CLT			ROA; 11				CHI; 34		IOW; 30	GLN; 32	MOH; 13	BRI; 19	ATL; 26	RCH; 26	CHI; 27	KEN; 26	DOV; 30	KAN; 16	CLT; 36	TEX; 31	PHO; 24	HOM; 38			21st	369	
2014	JD Motorsports	4	Chevy																DAY; RL^{†}	NHA; RL^{†}																			21st	369	
2016	TriStar Motorsports	10	Toyota	DAY	ATL	LVS	PHO	CAL; 40		BRI; 40	RCH	TAL	DOV; 38	CLT; 40	POC; 40	MCH; 40	IOW	DAY	KEN; 40	NHA; 40	IND; 38	IOW	GLN	MOH	BRI; 40	ROA	DAR; 40	RCH; 40	CHI; 40	KEN	DOV; 40	CLT; DNQ			PHO; 40	HOM; 40			107th	0^{1}	
2016	MBM Motorsports	13	Toyota						TEX; 32																														107th	0^{1}	
2016	TriStar Motorsports	14	Toyota																														KAN; 11	TEX; 36					107th	0^{1}	
2019	Joe Gibbs Racing	18	Toyota	DAY	ATL	LVS	PHO	CAL	TEX	BRI	RCH	TAL	DOV	CLT	POC	MCH	IOW	CHI	DAY	KEN	NHA	IOW	GLN	MOH	BRI	ROA; 27*	DAR	IND	LVS	RCH	ROV	DOV	KAN	TEX	PHO	HOM			100th	0^{1}	
2024	RSS Racing with Viking Motorsports	38	Ford	DAY	ATL	LVS	PHO	COA	RCH; 18	MAR; 21	TEX; 20	TAL; 8	DOV; 32	DAR; 25	CLT; 26	PIR; 31	SON; 21	IOW; 7	NHA; 38	NSH; 29	CSC; 23	POC; 24	IND; 16	MCH; 7	DAY; 33	DAR; 19	ATL; 35	GLN; 35	BRI; 34	KAN; 14	TAL; 16	ROV; 22	LVS; 16	HOM; 38	MAR; 16	PHO; 26			26th	393	
2025	Viking Motorsports	99	Chevy	DAY; 11	ATL; 12	COA; 32	PHO; 27	LVS; 16	HOM; 36	MAR; 26	DAR; 23	BRI; 23	CAR; 27	TAL; 5	TEX; 15	CLT; 36	NSH; 32	MXC; 16	POC; 19	ATL; 15	CSC; 28	SON; 26	DOV; 14	IND; 11	IOW; 35	GLN; 33	DAY; 33	PIR; 34	GTW; 11	BRI; 24	KAN; 23	ROV; 32	LVS; 19	TAL	MAR	PHO			27th	435	
2026	Joey Gase Motorsports with Scott Osteen	35	Chevy	DAY	ATL	COA	PHO	LVS	DAR; DNQ	MAR	ROC	BRI	KAN	TAL	TEX	GLN	DOV	CLT	NSH	POC	COR	SON	CHI	ATL	IND	IOW	DAY	DAR	GTW	BRI									52nd	30	
2026	Young's Motorsports	42	Chevy																												LVS; 23	CLT; 21	PHO	TAL	MAR	HOM			52nd	30	
^{†} – Relieved Jeffrey Earnhardt

==== Craftsman Truck Series ====
NASCAR Craftsman Truck Series results
Year	Team	No.	Make	1	2	3	4	5	6	7	8	9	10	11	12	13	14	15	16	17	18	19	20	21	22	23	NCTC	Pts	Ref
2016	Athenian Motorsports	05	Chevy	DAY	ATL	MAR	KAN	DOV	CLT	TEX	IOW	GTW	KEN	ELD	POC	BRI	MCH	MSP	CHI	NHA; PC^{†}	LVS	TAL	MAR	TEX	PHO	HOM	N/A	—	
2022	Rackley W.A.R.	25	Chevy	DAY; 10	LVS; 6	ATL; 30	COA; 31	MAR; 15	BRD; 35	DAR; 11	KAN; 7	TEX; 10	CLT; 17	GTW; 6	SON; 10	KNX; 14	NSH; 31	MOH; 19	POC; 12	IRP; 11	RCH; 17	KAN; 12	BRI; 27	TAL; 1	HOM; 19	PHO; 22	13th	521	
2023	Rackley W.A.R.	25	Chevy	DAY; 20	LVS; 12	ATL; 6	COA; 29	TEX; 32	BRD; 10	MAR; 7	KAN; 29	DAR; 25	NWS; 3	CLT; 8	GTW; 6	NSH; 7	MOH; 8	POC; 10	RCH; 17	IRP; 10	MLW; 27	KAN; 3	BRI; 10	TAL	HOM	PHO	10th	2102	
^{†} – Practiced for John Wes Townley

^{*} Season still in progress
^{1} Ineligible for series points

=== ARCA Menards Series ===
(key) (Bold – Pole position awarded by qualifying time. Italics – Pole position earned by points standings or practice time. * – Most laps led.)

ARCA Menards Series results
Year	Team	No.	Make	1	2	3	4	5	6	7	8	9	10	11	12	13	14	15	16	17	18	19	ARSC	Pts	Ref
2011	Hattori Racing Enterprises	14	Toyota	DAY	TAL	SLM	TOL	NJE	CHI	POC	MCH	WIN	BLN	IOW	IRP	POC	ISF	MAD	DSF	SLM; 6	KAN	TOL; 12	62nd	370	

==== K&N Pro Series East ====
NASCAR K&N Pro Series East results
Year	Team	No.	Make	1	2	3	4	5	6	7	8	9	10	11	12	13	14	NKNPSEC	Pts	Ref
2009	Joe Gibbs Racing	18	Toyota	GRE; 10	TRI; 1*	IOW	SBO		NHA; 1*	TMP; 3	ADI	**LRP**; 16	NHA	**DOV**; 11				14th	1099	
2009	Joe Gibbs Racing	18	Chevy					**GLN**; 5										14th	1099	
2011	X Team Racing	15	Toyota	GRE; 5	SBO; 2	RCH; 10	**IOW**; 13	BGS; 1**	JFC; 2	LGY; 4	NHA; 27	COL; 4	GRE; 10	NHA; 4	DOV; 22			4th	1741	
2012	Hattori Racing Enterprises	01	Toyota	BRI	GRE	RCH	IOW	BGS	JFC	LGY	CNB	COL	IOW; 20	NHA	DOV	GRE	CAR	72nd	24	
