= 2023 Virginia Cessna Citation crash =

Cessna crash in Virginia, United States

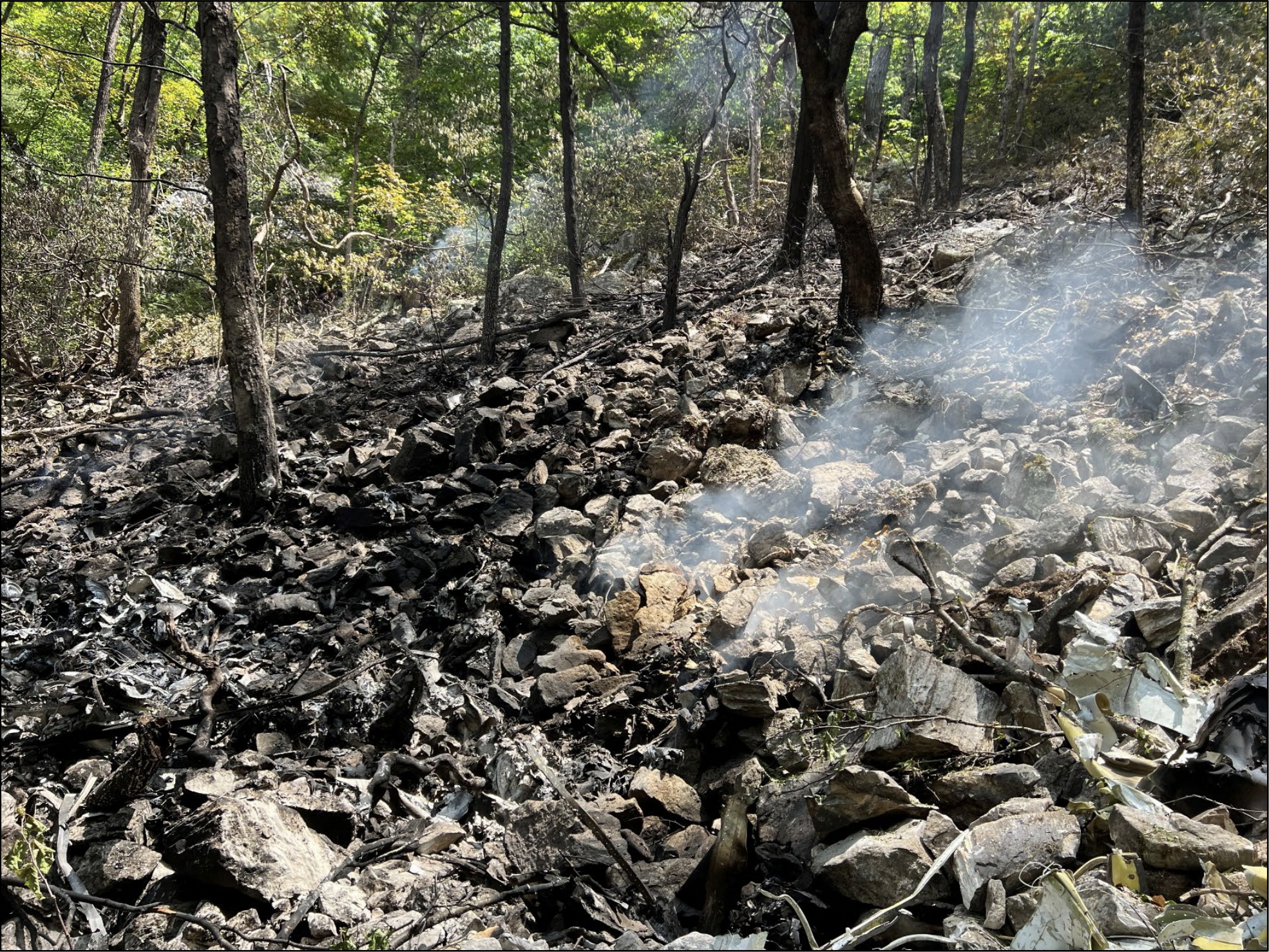
- The wreckage of the aircraft

Accident
- Date: June 4, 2023
- Summary: Loss of pressurization leading to crew incapacitation
- Site: Mine Bank Mountain, George Washington National Forest, Virginia, United States; 37.92157°N 79.10367°W

Aircraft
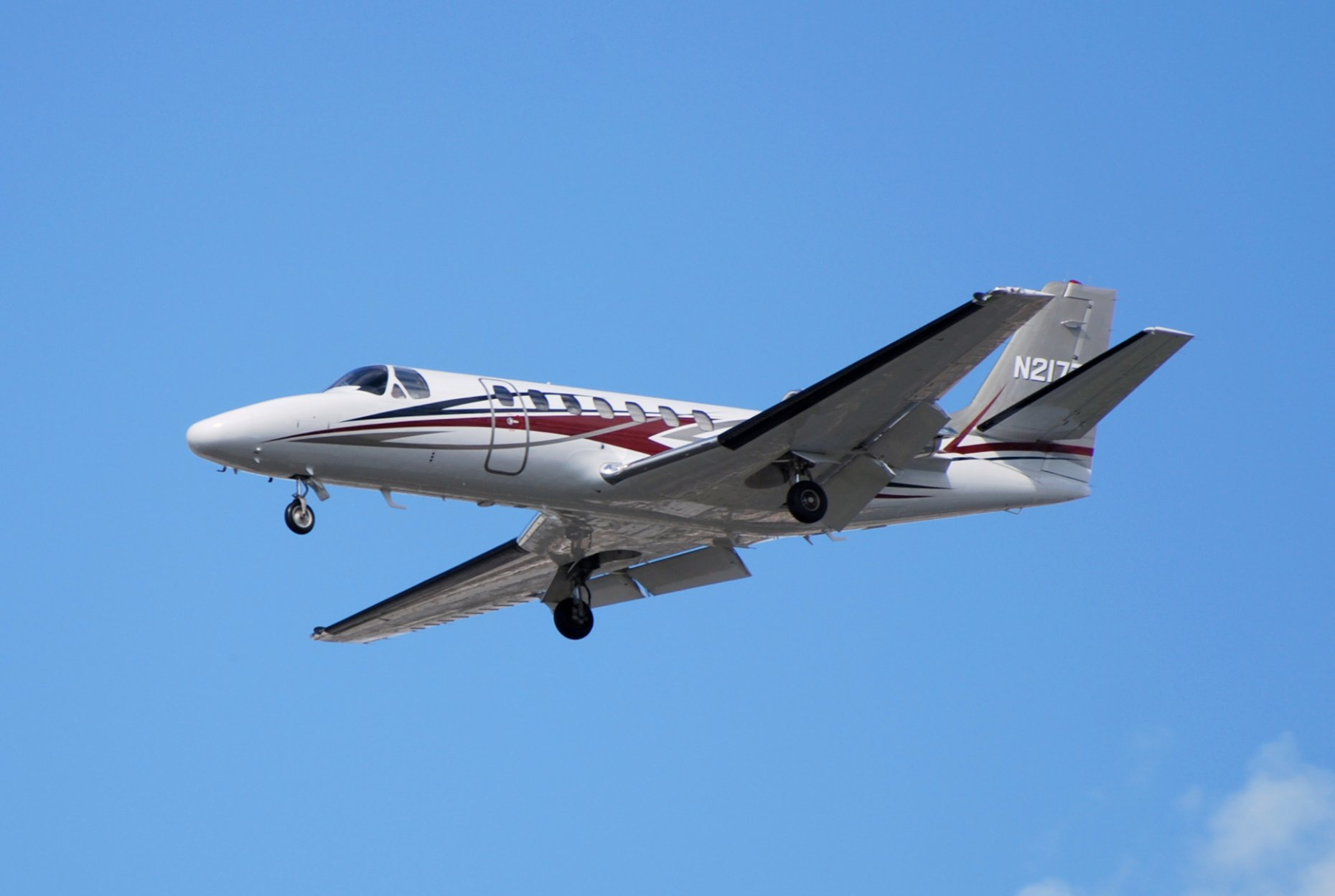
- A Cessna 560 Citation V similar to the one involved in the accident
- Aircraft type: Cessna 560 Citation V
- Operator: Privately owned
- Registration: N611VG
- Flight origin: Elizabethton Municipal Airport
- Stopover: Long Island MacArthur Airport
- Occupants: 4
- Passengers: 3
- Crew: 1
- Fatalities: 4
- Survivors: 0

On June 4, 2023, a privately operated Cessna 560 Citation V carrying three passengers and a pilot crashed at approximately 3:23 p.m. Eastern Daylight Time (EDT) in the George Washington National Forest, Virginia, United States, killing the occupants, after the crew had been found unresponsive. (Note: Page 2: "According to a North American Aerospace Defense Command (NORAD) statement, about 1520 the airplane was intercepted by fighter aircraft.") The plane had previously flown above the no-fly zone over Washington, D.C., and was intercepted by F-16 fighter jets before it crashed. The final report by the National Transportation Safety Board (NTSB), released on May 13, 2025, concluded the crew and passengers lost consciousness due to a depressurization of undetermined origin.

== Accident ==
The plane involved in the accident was a Cessna 560 Citation V, registered N611VG to Encore Motors of Melbourne, a Florida-based company under the ownership of John and Barbara Rumpel. It departed from Elizabethton Municipal Airport in Elizabethton, Tennessee, at approximately 1:15 p.m. EDT, bound for Long Island MacArthur Airport (ICAO: KISP) in New York. According to an NTSB spokesman, fifteen minutes after takeoff, air traffic control instructed the pilot to maintain altitude at 31,000 feet (9,449 m), but he did not respond. The plane continued climbing until reaching a cruising altitude of 34,000 feet (10,363 m) and flew on the correct bearing to land at MacArthur Airport.

After reaching Long Island, the plane followed the correct flight path to line up for the runway, but did not initiate its descent on approach, maintained its altitude and continued past the airport on the same heading as the runway alignment. The flight continued until it entered the restricted airspace over Washington, D.C. The U.S. Capitol complex was placed on "elevated alert" when the plane flew over the restricted airspace as reported by the U.S. Capitol Police. NORAD deployed six F-16 fighter jets to intercept the plane.

=== Interception and crash ===
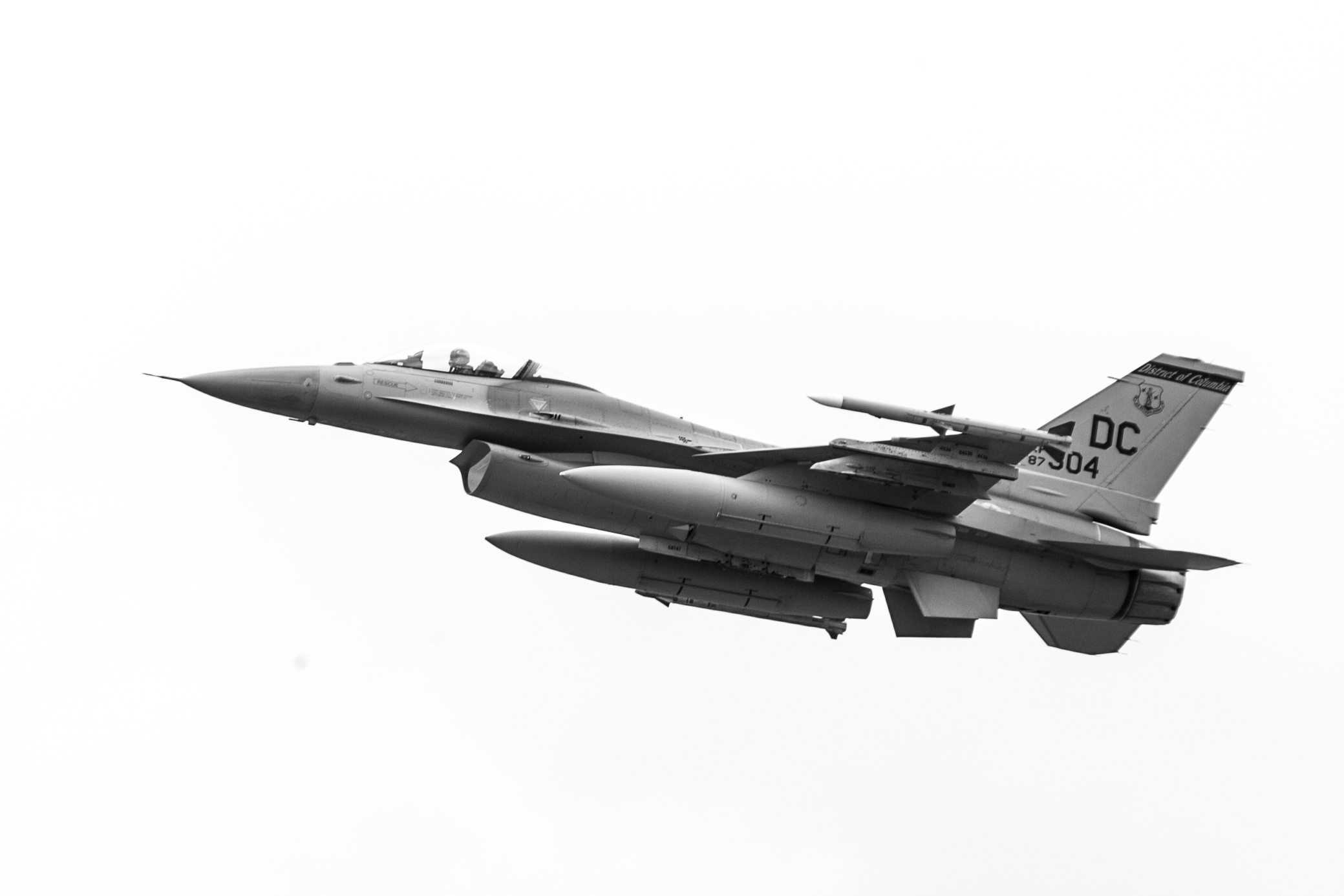
An F-16 Fighting Falcon of the 113th Wing, the unit involved in the interception

The Cessna was intercepted at approximately 3:20 p.m. Eastern Daylight Time. Two F-16 jets from the 113th Wing at Joint Base Andrews which engaged in supersonic flight over the capital region were the first to reach the Cessna, and attempted to contact the pilot. They used flares to draw the Cessna pilot's attention, although the plane's pilot was unresponsive. The flight continued on, flying past Washington, D.C., and entering the state of Virginia, until crashing at approximately 3:30 p.m. EDT. Tracking data from FlightAware indicated that the plane flew over Washington, D.C., at an altitude of 34,000 feet (10,363 m).

The plane crashed near Montebello, Virginia, on the north face of Mine Bank Mountain at an elevation of 2,760 feet (840 m), near the Mine Bank Creek Trail in the George Washington National Forest. Vegetation damage and crater at the site of the crash indicated fast, near-vertical descent.

== Passengers and crew ==
The FAA confirmed four people died as a result of the crash. John Rumpel's daughter, granddaughter, her nanny, as well as the pilot were on board the plane during the crash. By June 10, the names of three individuals onboard were known: pilot Jeff Hefner, and passengers Adina Azarian, Rumpel's daughter, and Aria Azarian, her daughter. In an interview, John Rumpel, who was not aboard at the time of the accident, said that the Cessna "descended at 20,000 feet a minute".

== Aftermath and investigation ==
First responders who were notified of the crash at 3:50 p.m. EDT reported that no survivors were found in the wreckage. CNN reported that the plane left a "crater", leading responders to believe that it impacted the ground at a very steep angle. A preliminary report was released by the National Transportation Safety Board on June 21, 2023.

=== Cause ===
The NTSB report

The owner of the aircraft has speculated that the crash was caused by hypoxia from the loss of cabin pressure, rendering the passengers and the pilot unconscious. U.S. officials said that the intercept pilots saw the Cessna's pilot "passed out" at the controls. The NTSB's preliminary report says that the cockpit voice recorder (CVR) has not been located. (Note: Page 3: "According to recent maintenance inspection records, the airplane as of May 2023 was equipped with a cockpit voice recorder (CVR), however, at the time of this publication, a CVR had not been located. The airplane was not equipped with a flight data recorder, nor was it required to be.") The jet was intercepted by fighter aircraft at about 3:20 p.m. EDT. Two minutes later it went into a right spiral into the terrain.

The final report from the NTSB, released on May 14, 2025, concluded the most likely cause of the accident was hypoxia caused by a lack of cabin pressurization but noted that this could not be corroborated by medical forensics of the deceased. The report cited incomplete maintenance as a contributing factor in the crash, as the owner of the plane recently declined to fix a number of issues, including several that would prevent the emergency oxygen system from deploying during a low- or no-oxygen scenario, as the plane's occupants would have experienced at that altitude without pressurization. The NTSB was unable to determine what could have caused the aircraft to depressurize. The CVR had also ultimately not been found.

== See also ==
- 2022 Baltic Sea Cessna Citation crash
- 1999 South Dakota Learjet crash
- 2023 in aviation
