= Elizabethton Municipal Airport =

- IATA: none; ICAO: none; FAA LID: 0A9

Summary
- Airport type: Public
- Owner: City of Elizabethton
- Serves: Elizabethton, Tennessee
- Elevation AMSL: 1,593 ft (486 m)
- Coordinates: 36°22′16″N 082°10′24″W

Map
- Location within Tennessee

Runways
Direction	Length		Surface
Direction	ft	m	Surface
06/24	5,001	1,524	Asphalt

Statistics (2020)
- Aircraft operations (year ending 6/30/2020): 30,500
- Based aircraft: 46
- Source: Federal Aviation Administration

Elizabethton Municipal Airport (FAA LID: 0A9) is three miles east of Elizabethton, in Carter County, Tennessee. The National Plan of Integrated Airport Systems for 2011–2015 categorized it as a general aviation airport.

== Facilities ==
The airport covers 96 acres (39 ha) at an elevation of 1593 feet (485 m). Its one runway, 06/24, is 5,001 by 70 feet (1,524 x 21 m).

In the year ending June 30, 2020, the airport had 30,500 aircraft operations, average 84 per day, all general aviation. 46 aircraft were then based at this airport: 36 single-engine, 5 multi-engine, 3 jet, and 1 helicopter.

== Accidents and incidents ==
- On August 15, 2019, a Cessna Citation Latitude private jet carrying Dale Earnhardt Jr. and his family was involved in a bounced landing where the airplane initially touched down on runway 24 before bouncing twice. On the third touchdown, the right main landing gear collapsed and the right wing contacted the runway. The airplane departed the paved surface beyond the runway 24 departure end threshold, through an open area of grass, down an embankment, through a chain-link fence, and up an embankment, coming to rest on the edge of Tennessee Highway 91. Pilots noted a go-around attempt failed when the aircraft failed to respond, so they decided to land the plane on the runway with less than 300 metres remaining in the runway. The crew then immediately evacuated Earnhardt, his wife Amy, daughter Isla Rose, and dog Gus. Dale Earnhardt, Jr. was relieved of his duties by NBC Sports for the 2019 Bass Pro Shops NRA Night Race as a precaution. No passengers were seriously injured.
- On June 4, 2023, a Cessna 560 Citation V, which took off from Elizabethton, crashed in the George Washington National Forest in Virginia, shortly after the plane entered restricted airspace over Washington D.C. All three passengers, as well as the pilot, were killed in the accident.

== See also ==
- List of airports in Tennessee
