= 2019 Consumers Energy 400 =

Race details
- Race 23 of 36 in the 2019 Monster Energy NASCAR Cup Series
- Date: August 11, 2019
- Location: Michigan International Speedway in Brooklyn, Michigan
- Course: Permanent racing facility
- Course length: 2 miles (3.2 km)
- Distance: 200 laps, 400 mi (640 km)
- Average speed: 149.084 miles per hour (239.927 km/h)

Pole position
Driver	Brad Keselowski	Team Penske
- Time: 37.801

Most laps led
Driver	Brad Keselowski	Team Penske
- Laps: 67

Winner
No. 4	Kevin Harvick	Stewart-Haas Racing

Television in the United States
- Network: NBCSN
- Announcers: Rick Allen, Jeff Burton, Steve Letarte and Dale Earnhardt Jr.
- Nielsen ratings: 2.897 million

Radio in the United States
- Radio: MRN
- Booth announcers: Alex Hayden, Jeff Striegle and Rusty Wallace
- Turn announcers: Dave Moody (1 & 2) and Kurt Becker (3 & 4)

The 2019 Consumers Energy 400 is a Monster Energy NASCAR Cup Series race held on August 11, 2019 at Michigan International Speedway in Brooklyn, Michigan. Contested over 200 laps on the two-mile (3.2 km) D-shaped oval, it is the 23rd race of the 2019 Monster Energy NASCAR Cup Series season.

== Report ==
=== Background ===
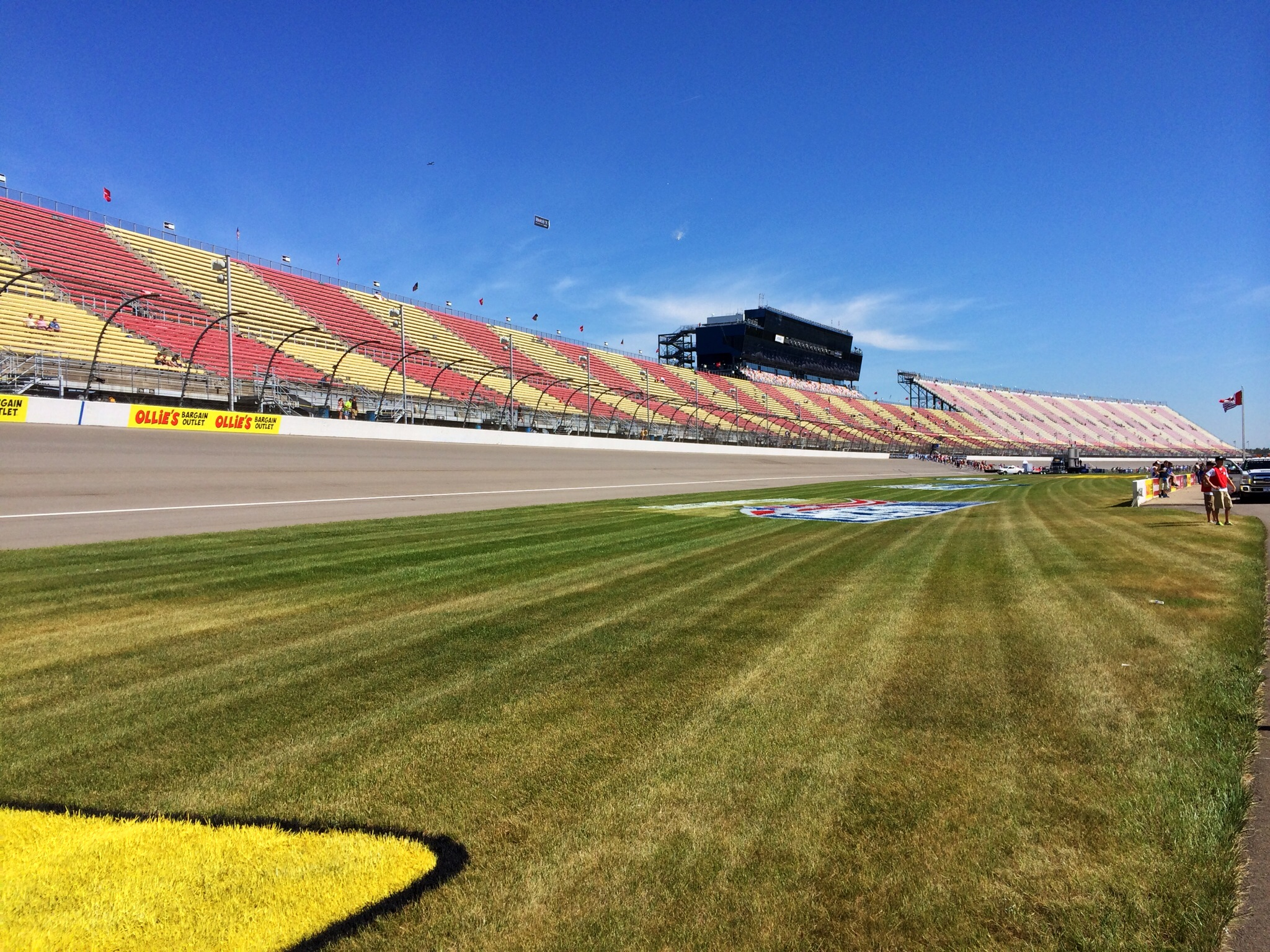
Michigan International Speedway

Michigan International Speedway (MIS) is a two-mile (3.2 km) moderate-banked D-shaped speedway located off U.S. Highway 12 on more than 1,400 acres (5.7 km^{2}) approximately four miles (6.4 km) south of the village of Brooklyn, in the scenic Irish Hills area of southeastern Michigan. The track is used primarily for NASCAR events. It is sometimes known as a "sister track" to Texas World Speedway, and was used as the basis of Auto Club Speedway. The track is owned by International Speedway Corporation (ISC). Michigan International Speedway is recognized as one of motorsports' premier facilities because of its wide racing surface and high banking (by open-wheel standards; the 18-degree banking is modest by stock car standards). Michigan is the fastest track in NASCAR due to its wide, sweeping corners and long straightaways; typical qualifying speeds are in excess of 200 mph (320 km/h) and corner entry speeds are anywhere from 215 to 220 mph (346 to 354 km/h) after the 2012 repaving of the track.

==== Entry list ====
- (i) denotes driver who are ineligible for series driver points.
- (R) denotes rookie driver.

No.	Driver	Team	Manufacturer
00	Landon Cassill (i)	StarCom Racing	Chevrolet
1	Kurt Busch	Chip Ganassi Racing	Chevrolet
2	Brad Keselowski	Team Penske	Ford
3	Austin Dillon	Richard Childress Racing	Chevrolet
4	Kevin Harvick	Stewart-Haas Racing	Ford
6	Ryan Newman	Roush Fenway Racing	Ford
8	Daniel Hemric (R)	Richard Childress Racing	Chevrolet
9	Chase Elliott	Hendrick Motorsports	Chevrolet
10	Aric Almirola	Stewart-Haas Racing	Ford
11	Denny Hamlin	Joe Gibbs Racing	Toyota
12	Ryan Blaney	Team Penske	Ford
13	Ty Dillon	Germain Racing	Chevrolet
14	Clint Bowyer	Stewart-Haas Racing	Ford
15	Ross Chastain (i)	Premium Motorsports	Chevrolet
17	Ricky Stenhouse Jr.	Roush Fenway Racing	Ford
18	Kyle Busch	Joe Gibbs Racing	Toyota
19	Martin Truex Jr.	Joe Gibbs Racing	Toyota
20	Erik Jones	Joe Gibbs Racing	Toyota
21	Paul Menard	Wood Brothers Racing	Ford
22	Joey Logano	Team Penske	Ford
24	William Byron	Hendrick Motorsports	Chevrolet
27	Quin Houff	Premium Motorsports	Chevrolet
32	Corey LaJoie	Go Fas Racing	Ford
34	Michael McDowell	Front Row Motorsports	Ford
36	Matt Tifft (R)	Front Row Motorsports	Ford
37	Chris Buescher	JTG Daugherty Racing	Chevrolet
38	David Ragan	Front Row Motorsports	Ford
41	Daniel Suárez	Stewart-Haas Racing	Ford
42	Kyle Larson	Chip Ganassi Racing	Chevrolet
43	Bubba Wallace	Richard Petty Motorsports	Chevrolet
47	Ryan Preece (R)	JTG Daugherty Racing	Chevrolet
48	Jimmie Johnson	Hendrick Motorsports	Chevrolet
51	Cody Ware (i)	Rick Ware Racing	Ford
52	Austin Theriault	Rick Ware Racing	Ford
53	Spencer Boyd (i)	Rick Ware Racing	Ford
77	Garrett Smithley (i)	Spire Motorsports	Chevrolet
88	Alex Bowman	Hendrick Motorsports	Chevrolet
95	Matt DiBenedetto	Leavine Family Racing	Toyota
Official entry list

== First practice ==
Austin Dillon was the fastest in the first practice session with a time of 37.901 seconds and a speed of 189.969 mph (305.725 km/h).

Pos	No.	Driver	Team	Manufacturer	Time	Speed
1	3	Austin Dillon	Richard Childress Racing	Chevrolet	37.901	189.969
2	2	Brad Keselowski	Team Penske	Ford	37.909	189.929
3	48	Jimmie Johnson	Hendrick Motorsports	Chevrolet	37.974	189.603
Official first practice results

== Qualifying ==
Brad Keselowski scored the pole for the race with a time of 37.801 and a speed of 190.471 mph (306.533 km/h).

=== Qualifying results ===
Pos	No.	Driver	Team	Manufacturer	Time
1	2	Brad Keselowski	Team Penske	Ford	37.801
2	4	Kevin Harvick	Stewart-Haas Racing	Ford	37.877
3	24	William Byron	Hendrick Motorsports	Chevrolet	37.954
4	88	Alex Bowman	Hendrick Motorsports	Chevrolet	37.993
5	14	Clint Bowyer	Stewart-Haas Racing	Ford	38.007
6	9	Chase Elliott	Hendrick Motorsports	Chevrolet	38.018
7	3	Austin Dillon	Richard Childress Racing	Chevrolet	38.030
8	12	Ryan Blaney	Team Penske	Ford	38.035
9	22	Joey Logano	Team Penske	Ford	38.044
10	21	Paul Menard	Wood Brothers Racing	Ford	38.076
11	8	Daniel Hemric (R)	Richard Childress Racing	Chevrolet	38.087
12	48	Jimmie Johnson	Hendrick Motorsports	Chevrolet	38.117
13	41	Daniel Suárez	Stewart-Haas Racing	Ford	38.204
14	10	Aric Almirola	Stewart-Haas Racing	Ford	38.219
15	1	Kurt Busch	Chip Ganassi Racing	Chevrolet	38.222
16	11	Denny Hamlin	Joe Gibbs Racing	Toyota	38.279
17	19	Martin Truex Jr.	Joe Gibbs Racing	Toyota	38.316
18	20	Erik Jones	Joe Gibbs Racing	Toyota	38.323
19	42	Kyle Larson	Chip Ganassi Racing	Chevrolet	38.385
20	17	Ricky Stenhouse Jr.	Roush Fenway Racing	Ford	38.398
21	36	Matt Tifft (R)	Front Row Motorsports	Ford	38.439
22	6	Ryan Newman	Roush Fenway Racing	Ford	38.527
23	13	Ty Dillon	Germain Racing	Chevrolet	38.585
24	18	Kyle Busch	Joe Gibbs Racing	Toyota	38.595
25	34	Michael McDowell	Front Row Motorsports	Ford	38.698
26	38	David Ragan	Front Row Motorsports	Ford	38.790
27	37	Chris Buescher	JTG Daugherty Racing	Chevrolet	38.854
28	43	Bubba Wallace	Richard Petty Motorsports	Chevrolet	38.863
29	95	Matt DiBenedetto	Leavine Family Racing	Toyota	38.902
30	00	Landon Cassill (i)	StarCom Racing	Chevrolet	38.922
31	47	Ryan Preece (R)	JTG Daugherty Racing	Chevrolet	39.121
32	15	Ross Chastain (i)	Premium Motorsports	Chevrolet	39.594
33	32	Corey LaJoie	Go Fas Racing	Ford	39.727
34	27	Quin Houff	Premium Motorsports	Chevrolet	40.004
35	52	Austin Theriault	Rick Ware Racing	Ford	40.133
36	51	Cody Ware (i)	Petty Ware Racing	Ford	40.135
37	77	Reed Sorenson	Spire Motorsports	Chevrolet	40.319
38	53	Spencer Boyd (i)	Rick Ware Racing	Ford	41.477
Official qualifying results

- Reed Sorenson practiced and qualified the No. 77 for Garrett Smithley, who was in Mid-Ohio for the Xfinity Series race.
- Austin Dillon and Daniel Hemric failed post-qualifying inspection and their times were disallowed. Each crew chief was fined $25,000 and 10 points were deducted from the driver and owner standings for each team.

== Practice (post-qualifying) ==
=== Second practice ===
Kevin Harvick was the fastest in the second practice session with a time of 37.795 seconds and a speed of 190.501 mph (306.582 km/h).

Pos	No.	Driver	Team	Manufacturer	Time	Speed
1	4	Kevin Harvick	Stewart-Haas Racing	Ford	37.795	190.501
2	18	Kyle Busch	Joe Gibbs Racing	Toyota	37.891	190.019
3	24	William Byron	Hendrick Motorsports	Chevrolet	37.895	189.999
Official second practice results

=== Final practice ===
Erik Jones was the fastest in the final practice session with a time of 37.926 seconds and a speed of 189.843 mph (305.523 km/h).

Pos	No.	Driver	Team	Manufacturer	Time	Speed
1	20	Erik Jones	Joe Gibbs Racing	Toyota	37.926	189.843
2	88	Alex Bowman	Hendrick Motorsports	Chevrolet	38.143	188.763
3	4	Kevin Harvick	Stewart-Haas Racing	Ford	38.168	188.640
Official final practice results

== Race ==
=== Stage results ===
Stage One Laps: 60

Pos	No	Driver	Team	Manufacturer	Points
1	19	Martin Truex Jr.	Joe Gibbs Racing	Toyota	10
2	11	Denny Hamlin	Joe Gibbs Racing	Toyota	9
3	2	Brad Keselowski	Team Penske	Ford	8
4	22	Joey Logano	Team Penske	Ford	7
5	24	William Byron	Hendrick Motorsports	Chevrolet	6
6	4	Kevin Harvick	Stewart-Haas Racing	Ford	5
7	12	Ryan Blaney	Team Penske	Ford	4
8	88	Alex Bowman	Hendrick Motorsports	Chevrolet	3
9	9	Chase Elliott	Hendrick Motorsports	Chevrolet	2
10	10	Aric Almirola	Stewart-Haas Racing	Ford	1
Official stage one results

Stage Two Laps: 60

Pos	No	Driver	Team	Manufacturer	Points
1	18	Kyle Busch	Joe Gibbs Racing	Toyota	10
2	19	Martin Truex Jr.	Joe Gibbs Racing	Toyota	9
3	1	Kurt Busch	Chip Ganassi Racing	Chevrolet	8
4	22	Joey Logano	Team Penske	Ford	7
5	20	Erik Jones	Joe Gibbs Racing	Toyota	6
6	9	Chase Elliott	Hendrick Motorsports	Chevrolet	5
7	12	Ryan Blaney	Team Penske	Ford	4
8	24	William Byron	Hendrick Motorsports	Chevrolet	3
9	14	Clint Bowyer	Stewart-Haas Racing	Ford	2
10	21	Paul Menard	Wood Brothers Racing	Ford	1
Official stage two results

=== Final stage results ===
Stage Three Laps: 80

Pos	Grid	No	Driver	Team	Manufacturer	Laps	Points
1	2	4	Kevin Harvick	Stewart-Haas Racing	Ford	200	45
2	14	11	Denny Hamlin	Joe Gibbs Racing	Toyota	200	44
3	17	42	Kyle Larson	Chip Ganassi Racing	Chevrolet	200	34
4	15	19	Martin Truex Jr.	Joe Gibbs Racing	Toyota	200	52
5	11	41	Daniel Suárez	Stewart-Haas Racing	Ford	200	32
6	22	18	Kyle Busch	Joe Gibbs Racing	Toyota	200	41
7	29	47	Ryan Preece (R)	JTG Daugherty Racing	Chevrolet	200	30
8	3	24	William Byron	Hendrick Motorsports	Chevrolet	200	38
9	6	9	Chase Elliott	Hendrick Motorsports	Chevrolet	200	35
10	4	88	Alex Bowman	Hendrick Motorsports	Chevrolet	200	30
11	21	13	Ty Dillon	Germain Racing	Chevrolet	200	26
12	20	6	Ryan Newman	Roush Fenway Racing	Ford	200	25
13	37	3	Austin Dillon	Richard Childress Racing	Chevrolet	200	24
14	25	37	Chris Buescher	JTG Daugherty Racing	Chevrolet	200	23
15	9	21	Paul Menard	Wood Brothers Racing	Ford	200	23
16	24	38	David Ragan	Front Row Motorsports	Ford	200	21
17	8	22	Joey Logano	Team Penske	Ford	200	34
18	16	20	Erik Jones	Joe Gibbs Racing	Toyota	200	25
19	1	2	Brad Keselowski	Team Penske	Ford	200	26
20	27	95	Matt DiBenedetto	Leavine Family Racing	Toyota	200	17
21	31	32	Corey LaJoie	Go Fas Racing	Ford	200	16
22	23	34	Michael McDowell	Front Row Motorsports	Ford	200	15
23	13	1	Kurt Busch	Chip Ganassi Racing	Chevrolet	200	22
24	7	12	Ryan Blaney	Team Penske	Ford	200	21
25	19	36	Matt Tifft (R)	Front Row Motorsports	Ford	199	12
26	38	8	Daniel Hemric (R)	Richard Childress Racing	Chevrolet	199	11
27	26	43	Bubba Wallace	Richard Petty Motorsports	Chevrolet	199	10
28	18	17	Ricky Stenhouse Jr.	Roush Fenway Racing	Ford	199	9
29	30	15	Ross Chastain (i)	Premium Motorsports	Chevrolet	198	0
30	28	00	Landon Cassill (i)	StarCom Racing	Chevrolet	196	0
31	32	27	Quin Houff	Premium Motorsports	Chevrolet	196	6
32	33	52	Austin Theriault	Rick Ware Racing	Ford	194	5
33	12	10	Aric Almirola	Stewart-Haas Racing	Ford	193	5
34	10	48	Jimmie Johnson	Hendrick Motorsports	Chevrolet	192	3
35	35	77	Garrett Smithley (i)	Spire Motorsports	Chevrolet	192	0
36	34	51	Cody Ware (i)	Petty Ware Racing	Ford	191	0
37	5	14	Clint Bowyer	Stewart-Haas Racing	Ford	139	3
38	36	53	Spencer Boyd (i)	Rick Ware Racing	Ford	123	0
Official race results

=== Race statistics ===
- Lead changes: 19 among 8 different drivers
- Cautions/Laps: 6 for 24
- Red flags: 0
- Time of race: 2 hours, 40 minutes and 59 seconds
- Average speed: 149.084 miles per hour (239.927 km/h)

== Media ==
=== Television ===
NBC Sports covered the race on the television side. Rick Allen, Jeff Burton, Steve Letarte and two-time Michigan winner, Dale Earnhardt Jr. had the call in the booth for the race. Parker Kligerman, Marty Snider and Kelli Stavast reported from pit lane during the race.

NBCSN
Booth announcers	Pit reporters
Lap-by-lap: Rick Allen; Color-commentator: Jeff Burton; Color-commentator: Steve Letarte; Color-commentator: Dale Earnhardt Jr.	Parker Kligerman; Marty Snider; Kelli Stavast

=== Radio ===
Motor Racing Network had the radio call for the race, which was simulcast on Sirius XM NASCAR Radio. Alex Hayden, Jeff Striegle and four time Michigan winner Rusty Wallace had the call from the booth. Dave Moody called the action when the field raced thru turns 1 & 2. Kyle Rickey had the call for the race when the field raced thru turns 3 & 4. Covering the action in the pits was Woody Cain, Kim Coon, and Pete Pistone.

MRN
Booth announcers	Turn announcers	Pit reporters
Lead announcer: Alex Hayden; Announcer: Jeff Striegle; Announcer: Rusty Wallace	Turns 1 & 2: Dave Moody; Turns 3 & 4: Kyle Rickey	Woody Cain; Kim Coon; Pete Pistone

== Standings after the race ==
Drivers' Championship standings

	Pos	Driver	Points
	1	Kyle Busch	892
	2	Joey Logano	872 (–20)
	3	Kevin Harvick	822 (–70)
	4	Denny Hamlin	815 (–77)
	5	Martin Truex Jr.	805 (–87)
	6	Brad Keselowski	754 (–138)
1	7	Chase Elliott	711 (–181)
1	8	Kurt Busch	701 (–191)
1	9	Ryan Blaney	654 (–238)
1	10	Alex Bowman	653 (–239)
2	11	Aric Almirola	645 (–247)
	12	William Byron	642 (–250)
1	13	Kyle Larson	624 (–268)
1	14	Erik Jones	623 (–269)
2	15	Ryan Newman	569 (–323)
1	16	Clint Bowyer	559 (–333)
Official driver's standings

Manufacturers' Championship standings

Pos	Manufacturer	Points
1	Toyota	837
2	Ford	816 (–21)
3	Chevrolet	782 (–55)

- Note: Only the first 16 positions are included for the driver standings.
- . – Driver has clinched a position in the Monster Energy NASCAR Cup Series playoffs.

Previous race: 2019 Go Bowling at The Glen	Monster Energy NASCAR Cup Series; 2019 season	Next race: 2019 Bass Pro Shops NRA Night Race
