= Mine Bank Mountain =

Mountain in Virginia, United States

Highest point
- Elevation: 3,488 ft (1,063 m)
- Coordinates: 37°55′07″N 79°6′01″W

Geography
- Country: United States
- State: Virginia
- Region: Augusta
- Parent range: Blue Ridge Mountains

Climbing
- Access: Blue Ridge Parkway

Mine Bank Mountain is a 3,488-foot (1,063 m) peak in the U.S. state of Virginia, in the Saint Mary's Wilderness near the Blue Ridge Parkway.

The mountain was the site of the 2023 Virginia plane crash, which struck 300 feet (100 m) below the peak, killing all four on board.

The mountain is named for nearby manganese-iron ore mines.

Hikes up the mountain can be accomplished on the Mine Bank Trail, a 10-mile (16 km) loop, with a trailhead on the Blue Ridge Parkway (37°54.682′N 79°05.202′W).
