= 2019 Pennzoil 400 =

Third race of the 2019 Monster Energy Cup Series

Race details
- Race 3 of 36 in the 2019 Monster Energy NASCAR Cup Series
- 2019 Pennzoil 400 program cover
- Date: March 3, 2019
- Location: Las Vegas Motor Speedway in Las Vegas
- Course: Permanent racing facility
- Course length: 1.5 miles (2.4 km)
- Distance: 267 laps, 400.5 mi (640.8 km)
- Average speed: 154.849 miles per hour (249.205 km/h)

Pole position
Driver	Kevin Harvick	Stewart-Haas Racing
- Time: 29.914

Most laps led
Driver	Kevin Harvick	Stewart-Haas Racing
- Laps: 88

Winner
No. 22	Joey Logano	Team Penske

Television in the United States
- Network: Fox
- Announcers: Mike Joy, Jeff Gordon and Darrell Waltrip
- Nielsen ratings: 5.115 million

Radio in the United States
- Radio: PRN
- Booth announcers: Doug Rice and Mark Garrow
- Turn announcers: Rob Albright (1 & 2) and Pat Patterson (3 & 4)

The 2019 Pennzoil 400 presented by Jiffy Lube was a Monster Energy NASCAR Cup Series race held on March 3, 2019, at Las Vegas Motor Speedway in Las Vegas. Contested over 267 laps on the 1.5 mi (2.4 km) asphalt intermediate speedway, it was the third race of the 2019 Monster Energy NASCAR Cup Series season.

== Report ==
=== Background ===
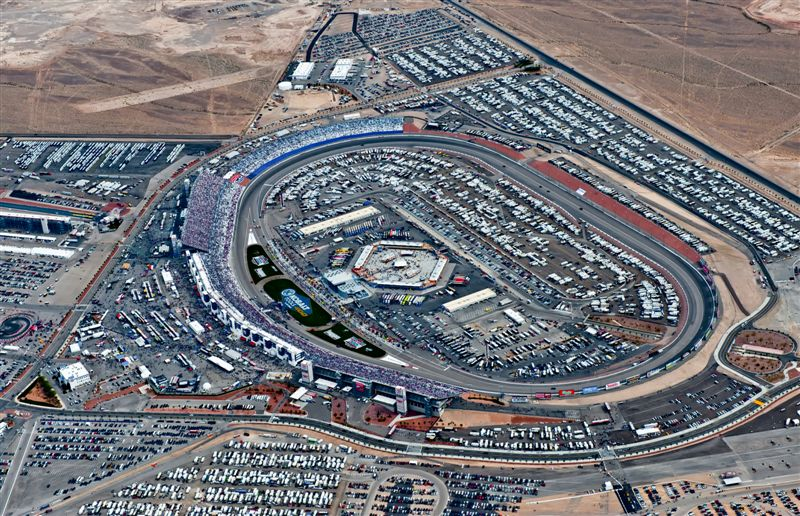
Las Vegas Motor Speedway, the track where the race was held.

Las Vegas Motor Speedway, located in Clark County, Nevada outside the Las Vegas city limits and about 15 miles northeast of the Las Vegas Strip, is a 1,200-acre (490 ha) complex of multiple tracks for motorsports racing. The complex is owned by Speedway Motorsports, Inc., which is headquartered in Charlotte, North Carolina.

==== Entry list ====
No.	Driver	Team	Manufacturer
00	Landon Cassill	StarCom Racing	Chevrolet
1	Kurt Busch	Chip Ganassi Racing	Chevrolet
2	Brad Keselowski	Team Penske	Ford
3	Austin Dillon	Richard Childress Racing	Chevrolet
4	Kevin Harvick	Stewart-Haas Racing	Ford
6	Ryan Newman	Roush Fenway Racing	Ford
8	Daniel Hemric (R)	Richard Childress Racing	Chevrolet
9	Chase Elliott	Hendrick Motorsports	Chevrolet
10	Aric Almirola	Stewart-Haas Racing	Ford
11	Denny Hamlin	Joe Gibbs Racing	Toyota
12	Ryan Blaney	Team Penske	Ford
13	Ty Dillon	Germain Racing	Chevrolet
14	Clint Bowyer	Stewart-Haas Racing	Ford
15	Ross Chastain (i)	Premium Motorsports	Chevrolet
17	Ricky Stenhouse Jr.	Roush Fenway Racing	Ford
18	Kyle Busch	Joe Gibbs Racing	Toyota
19	Martin Truex Jr.	Joe Gibbs Racing	Toyota
20	Erik Jones	Joe Gibbs Racing	Toyota
21	Paul Menard	Wood Brothers Racing	Ford
22	Joey Logano	Team Penske	Ford
24	William Byron	Hendrick Motorsports	Chevrolet
32	Corey LaJoie	Go Fas Racing	Ford
34	Michael McDowell	Front Row Motorsports	Ford
36	Matt Tifft (R)	Front Row Motorsports	Ford
37	Chris Buescher	JTG Daugherty Racing	Chevrolet
38	David Ragan	Front Row Motorsports	Ford
41	Daniel Suárez	Stewart-Haas Racing	Ford
42	Kyle Larson	Chip Ganassi Racing	Chevrolet
43	Bubba Wallace	Richard Petty Motorsports	Chevrolet
47	Ryan Preece (R)	JTG Daugherty Racing	Chevrolet
48	Jimmie Johnson	Hendrick Motorsports	Chevrolet
51	Cody Ware (R)	Petty Ware Racing	Chevrolet
52	B. J. McLeod (i)	Rick Ware Racing	Ford
66	Joey Gase (i)	MBM Motorsports	Toyota
77	Reed Sorenson	Spire Motorsports	Chevrolet
88	Alex Bowman	Hendrick Motorsports	Chevrolet
95	Matt DiBenedetto	Leavine Family Racing	Toyota
96	Parker Kligerman (i)	Gaunt Brothers Racing	Toyota
Official entry list

== First practice ==
Austin Dillon was the fastest in the first practice session with a time of 29.951 seconds and a speed of 180.294 mph (290.155 km/h).

Pos	No.	Driver	Team	Manufacturer	Time	Speed
1	3	Austin Dillon	Richard Childress Racing	Chevrolet	29.951	180.294
2	8	Daniel Hemric (R)	Richard Childress Racing	Chevrolet	29.987	180.078
3	11	Denny Hamlin	Joe Gibbs Racing	Toyota	29.995	180.030
Official first practice results

== Qualifying ==
Kevin Harvick scored the pole for the race with a time of 29.914 and a speed of 180.517 mph (290.514 km/h).

=== Qualifying results ===
Pos	No.	Driver	Team	Manufacturer	R1	R2	R3
1	4	Kevin Harvick	Stewart-Haas Racing	Ford	30.222	29.814	29.914
2	11	Denny Hamlin	Joe Gibbs Racing	Toyota	30.083	30.046	29.924
3	18	Kyle Busch	Joe Gibbs Racing	Toyota	30.151	30.001	30.049
4	3	Austin Dillon	Richard Childress Racing	Chevrolet	30.006	29.816	30.082
5	8	Daniel Hemric (R)	Richard Childress Racing	Chevrolet	30.076	30.049	30.087
6	38	David Ragan	Front Row Motorsports	Ford	30.174	30.003	30.092
7	42	Kyle Larson	Chip Ganassi Racing	Chevrolet	30.030	29.929	30.131
8	17	Ricky Stenhouse Jr.	Roush Fenway Racing	Ford	30.048	29.992	30.234
9	48	Jimmie Johnson	Hendrick Motorsports	Chevrolet	30.153	30.003	30.255
10	22	Joey Logano	Team Penske	Ford	30.073	30.047	30.356
11	88	Alex Bowman	Hendrick Motorsports	Chevrolet	30.080	29.985	30.504
12	9	Chase Elliott	Hendrick Motorsports	Chevrolet	30.159	30.008	30.533
13	12	Ryan Blaney	Team Penske	Ford	30.078	30.055	—
14	13	Ty Dillon	Germain Racing	Chevrolet	30.123	30.061	—
15	21	Paul Menard	Wood Brothers Racing	Ford	30.256	30.071	—
16	34	Michael McDowell	Front Row Motorsports	Ford	30.126	30.082	—
17	14	Clint Bowyer	Stewart-Haas Racing	Ford	30.241	30.096	—
18	20	Erik Jones	Joe Gibbs Racing	Toyota	30.100	30.101	—
19	2	Brad Keselowski	Team Penske	Ford	30.276	30.132	—
20	24	William Byron	Hendrick Motorsports	Chevrolet	30.165	30.163	—
21	43	Bubba Wallace	Richard Petty Motorsports	Chevrolet	30.213	30.168	—
22	41	Daniel Suárez	Stewart-Haas Racing	Ford	30.221	30.169	—
23	19	Martin Truex Jr.	Joe Gibbs Racing	Toyota	30.171	30.174	—
24	47	Ryan Preece (R)	JTG Daugherty Racing	Chevrolet	30.124	30.344	—
25	10	Aric Almirola	Stewart-Haas Racing	Ford	30.283	—	—
26	95	Matt DiBenedetto	Leavine Family Racing	Toyota	30.296	—	—
27	37	Chris Buescher	JTG Daugherty Racing	Chevrolet	30.300	—	—
28	1	Kurt Busch	Chip Ganassi Racing	Chevrolet	30.310	—	—
29	6	Ryan Newman	Roush Fenway Racing	Ford	30.329	—	—
30	32	Corey LaJoie	Go Fas Racing	Ford	30.458	—	—
31	00	Landon Cassill	StarCom Racing	Chevrolet	30.626	—	—
32	96	Parker Kligerman (i)	Gaunt Brothers Racing	Toyota	30.640	—	—
33	51	Cody Ware (R)	Petty Ware Racing	Chevrolet	31.324	—	—
34	52	B. J. McLeod (i)	Rick Ware Racing	Ford	31.820	—	—
35	36	Matt Tifft (R)	Front Row Motorsports	Ford	32.450	—	—
36	66	Joey Gase (i)	MBM Motorsports	Toyota	33.864	—	—
37	77	Reed Sorenson	Spire Motorsports	Chevrolet	0.000	—	—
38	15	Ross Chastain (i)	Premium Motorsports	Chevrolet	0.000	—	—
Official qualifying results

== Practice (post-qualifying) ==
=== Second practice ===
Second practice session scheduled for Saturday was cancelled due to rain.

=== Final practice ===
Austin Dillon was the fastest in the final practice session with a time of 30.299 seconds and a speed of 178.224 mph (286.824 km/h).

Pos	No.	Driver	Team	Manufacturer	Time	Speed
1	3	Austin Dillon	Richard Childress Racing	Chevrolet	30.299	178.224
2	8	Daniel Hemric (R)	Richard Childress Racing	Chevrolet	30.496	177.072
3	17	Ricky Stenhouse Jr.	Roush Fenway Racing	Ford	30.521	176.927
Official final practice results

== Race ==
=== Stage Results ===
Stage One Laps: 80

Pos	No	Driver	Team	Manufacturer	Points
1	4	Kevin Harvick	Stewart-Haas Racing	Ford	10
2	18	Kyle Busch	Joe Gibbs Racing	Toyota	9
3	22	Joey Logano	Team Penske	Ford	8
4	11	Denny Hamlin	Joe Gibbs Racing	Toyota	7
5	20	Erik Jones	Joe Gibbs Racing	Toyota	6
6	17	Ricky Stenhouse Jr.	Roush Fenway Racing	Ford	5
7	19	Martin Truex Jr.	Joe Gibbs Racing	Toyota	4
8	9	Chase Elliott	Hendrick Motorsports	Chevrolet	3
9	41	Daniel Suárez	Stewart-Haas Racing	Ford	2
10	2	Brad Keselowski	Team Penske	Ford	1
Official stage one results

Stage Two Laps: 80

Pos	No	Driver	Team	Manufacturer	Points
1	22	Joey Logano	Team Penske	Ford	10
2	4	Kevin Harvick	Stewart-Haas Racing	Ford	9
3	19	Martin Truex Jr.	Joe Gibbs Racing	Toyota	8
4	2	Brad Keselowski	Team Penske	Ford	7
5	11	Denny Hamlin	Joe Gibbs Racing	Toyota	6
6	9	Chase Elliott	Hendrick Motorsports	Chevrolet	5
7	10	Aric Almirola	Stewart-Haas Racing	Ford	4
8	17	Ricky Stenhouse Jr.	Roush Fenway Racing	Ford	3
9	88	Alex Bowman	Hendrick Motorsports	Chevrolet	2
10	48	Jimmie Johnson	Hendrick Motorsports	Chevrolet	1
Official stage two results

=== Final Stage Results ===
Stage Three Laps: 107

Pos	Grid	No	Driver	Team	Manufacturer	Laps	Points
1	10	22	Joey Logano	Team Penske	Ford	267	58
2	19	2	Brad Keselowski	Team Penske	Ford	267	43
3	3	18	Kyle Busch	Joe Gibbs Racing	Toyota	267	43
4	1	4	Kevin Harvick	Stewart-Haas Racing	Ford	267	52
5	28	1	Kurt Busch	Chip Ganassi Racing	Chevrolet	267	32
6	8	17	Ricky Stenhouse Jr.	Roush Fenway Racing	Ford	267	39
7	25	10	Aric Almirola	Stewart-Haas Racing	Ford	267	34
8	23	19	Martin Truex Jr.	Joe Gibbs Racing	Toyota	267	41
9	12	9	Chase Elliott	Hendrick Motorsports	Chevrolet	267	36
10	2	11	Denny Hamlin	Joe Gibbs Racing	Toyota	267	40
11	11	88	Alex Bowman	Hendrick Motorsports	Chevrolet	267	28
12	7	42	Kyle Larson	Chip Ganassi Racing	Chevrolet	267	25
13	18	20	Erik Jones	Joe Gibbs Racing	Toyota	267	30
14	17	14	Clint Bowyer	Stewart-Haas Racing	Ford	267	23
15	15	21	Paul Menard	Wood Brothers Racing	Ford	267	22
16	20	24	William Byron	Hendrick Motorsports	Chevrolet	267	21
17	22	41	Daniel Suárez	Stewart-Haas Racing	Ford	267	22
18	27	37	Chris Buescher	JTG Daugherty Racing	Chevrolet	267	19
19	9	48	Jimmie Johnson	Hendrick Motorsports	Chevrolet	266	19
20	4	3	Austin Dillon	Richard Childress Racing	Chevrolet	266	17
21	26	95	Matt DiBenedetto	Leavine Family Racing	Toyota	266	16
22	13	12	Ryan Blaney	Team Penske	Ford	266	15
23	5	8	Daniel Hemric (R)	Richard Childress Racing	Chevrolet	265	14
24	29	6	Ryan Newman	Roush Fenway Racing	Ford	265	13
25	24	47	Ryan Preece (R)	JTG Daugherty Racing	Chevrolet	265	12
26	21	43	Bubba Wallace	Richard Petty Motorsports	Chevrolet	265	11
27	30	32	Corey LaJoie	Go Fas Racing	Ford	264	10
28	6	38	David Ragan	Front Row Motorsports	Ford	264	9
29	14	13	Ty Dillon	Germain Racing	Chevrolet	264	8
30	16	34	Michael McDowell	Front Row Motorsports	Ford	263	7
31	32	96	Parker Kligerman (i)	Gaunt Brothers Racing	Toyota	263	0
32	31	00	Landon Cassill	StarCom Racing	Chevrolet	260	5
33	38	15	Ross Chastain (i)	Premium Motorsports	Chevrolet	259	0
34	35	36	Matt Tifft (R)	Front Row Motorsports	Ford	259	3
35	33	51	Cody Ware (R)	Petty Ware Racing	Chevrolet	253	2
36	37	77	Reed Sorenson	Spire Motorsports	Chevrolet	252	1
37	34	52	B. J. McLeod (i)	Rick Ware Racing	Ford	220	0
38	36	66	Joey Gase (i)	MBM Motorsports	Toyota	10	0
Official race results

=== Race statistics ===
- Lead changes: 19 among 9 different drivers
- Cautions/Laps: 2 for 12 (both for end of stage breaks; first race to go without an incident-related caution since the 2012 Auto Club 400, which went green until the race-ending caution for rain)
- Red flags: 0
- Time of race: 2 hours, 35 minutes and 11 seconds
- Average speed: 154.849 miles per hour (249.205 km/h)

== Media ==
=== Television ===
Fox Sports covered their 19th race at the Las Vegas Motor Speedway. Mike Joy, 2001 race winner Jeff Gordon and Darrell Waltrip called from the booth for the race. Jamie Little, Vince Welch and Matt Yocum handled the pit road duties for the television side.

Fox
Booth announcers	Pit reporters
Lap-by-lap: Mike Joy; Color-commentator: Jeff Gordon; Color commentator: Darrell Waltrip	Jamie Little; Vince Welch; Matt Yocum

=== Radio ===
PRN covered the radio call for the race which was simulcasted on Sirius XM NASCAR Radio. Doug Rice and Mark Garrow called the race in the booth when the field raced through the tri-oval. Rob Albright called the race from a billboard in turn 2 when the field raced through turns 1 and 2. Pat Patterson called the race from a billboard outside of turn 3 when the field raced through turns 3 and 4. Brad Gillie, Brett McMillan, Wendy Venturini and Heather DeBeaux worked pit road for the radio side.

PRN
Booth announcers	Turn announcers	Pit reporters
Lead announcer: Doug Rice; Announcer: Mark Garrow	Turns 1 & 2: Rob Albright; Turns 3 & 4: Pat Patterson	Brad Gillie; Brett McMillan; Wendy Venturini; Heather DeBeaux

== Standings after the race ==
Drivers' Championship standings

	Pos	Driver	Points
4	1	Joey Logano	133
	2	Kevin Harvick	131 (–2)
2	3	Denny Hamlin	127 (–6)
1	4	Kyle Busch	121 (–12)
1	5	Brad Keselowski	115 (–18)
2	6	Kyle Larson	102 (–31)
3	7	Ricky Stenhouse Jr.	99 (–34)
4	8	Martin Truex Jr.	98 (–35)
2	9	Erik Jones	98 (–35)
2	10	Kurt Busch	95 (–38)
	11	Aric Almirola	92 (–41)
1	12	Alex Bowman	85 (–48)
4	13	Clint Bowyer	83 (–50)
3	14	Chase Elliott	81 (–52)
1	15	Ryan Blaney	69 (–64)
2	16	William Byron	66 (–67)
Official driver's standings

Manufacturers' Championship standings

	Pos	Manufacturer	Points
1	1	Ford	113
1	2	Toyota	109 (–4)
	3	Chevrolet	97 (–16)

- Note: Only the first 16 positions are included for the driver standings.

Previous race: 2019 Folds of Honor QuikTrip 500	Monster Energy NASCAR Cup Series; 2019 season	Next race: 2019 TicketGuardian 500
