= 2019 Drydene 400 =

Race details
- Race 30 of 36 in the 2019 Monster Energy NASCAR Cup Series
- The 2019 Drydene 400 program cover, celebrating 100 NASCAR Cup Series races at the track.
- Date: October 6, 2019
- Location: Dover International Speedway in Dover, Delaware
- Course: Permanent racing facility
- Course length: 1 miles (1.6 km)
- Distance: 400 laps, 400 mi (640 km)
- Average speed: 135.734 miles per hour (218.443 km/h)

Pole position
Driver	Denny Hamlin	Joe Gibbs Racing
- Time: 21.559

Most laps led
Driver	Denny Hamlin	Joe Gibbs Racing
- Laps: 219

Winner
No. 42	Kyle Larson	Chip Ganassi Racing

Television in the United States
- Network: NBCSN
- Announcers: Rick Allen, Jeff Burton, Steve Letarte and Dale Earnhardt Jr.
- Nielsen ratings: 1.826 million

Radio in the United States
- Radio: MRN
- Booth announcers: Alex Hayden, Jeff Striegle and Rusty Wallace
- Turn announcers: Mike Bagley (Backstretch)

The 2019 Drydene 400 was a Monster Energy NASCAR Cup Series race that was held on October 6, 2019 at Dover International Speedway in Dover, Delaware. Contested over 400 laps on the one-mile (1.6 km) concrete speedway, it was the 30th race of the 2019 Monster Energy NASCAR Cup Series season, the fourth race of the Playoffs, and the first race of the Round of 12. Kyle Larson won the race, his first of the season and ultimately last driving for Chip Ganassi Racing.

== Report ==
=== Background ===
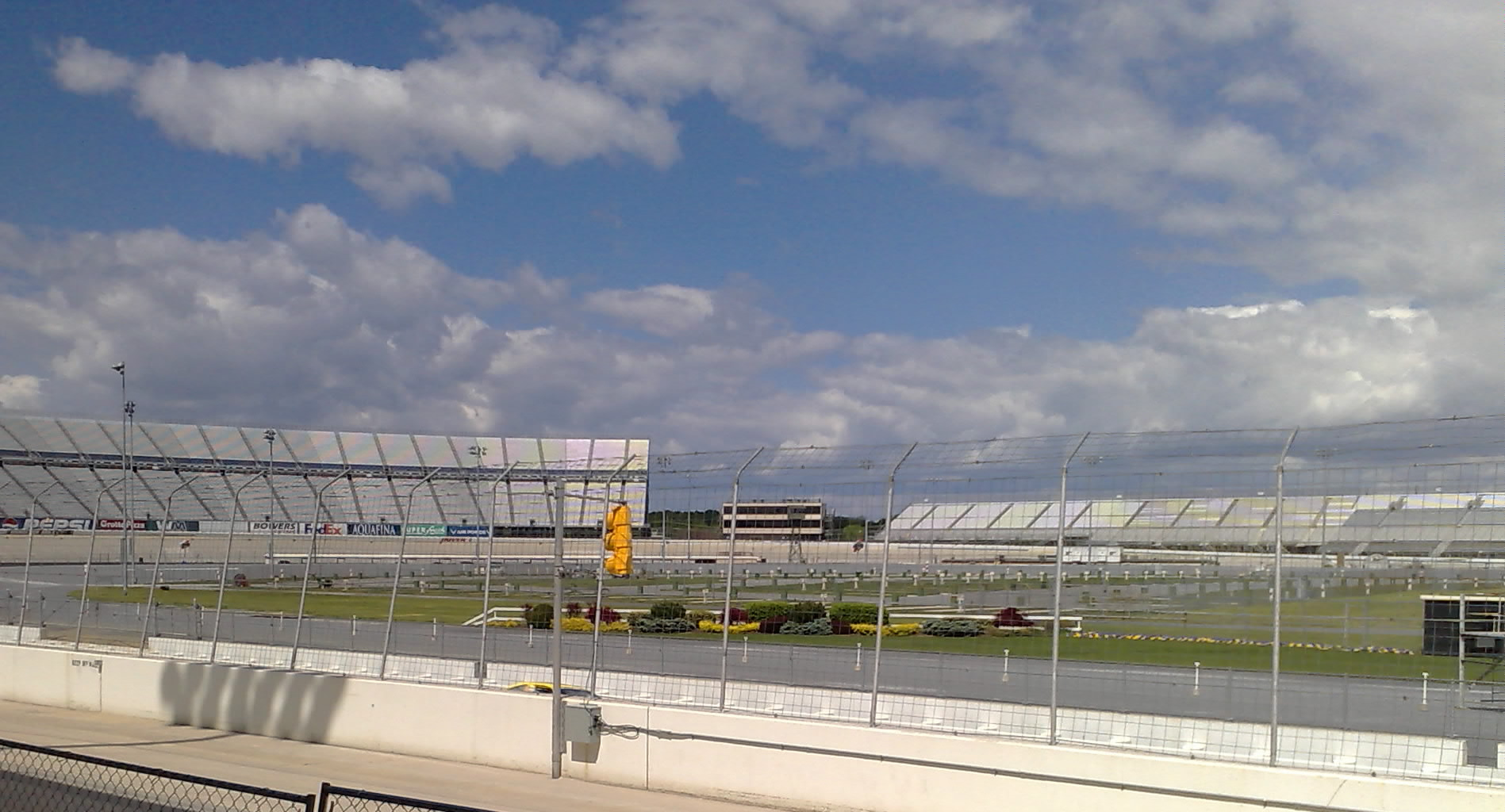
Dover International Speedway, the track where the race was held.

Dover International Speedway (formerly Dover Downs International Speedway) is a race track in Dover, Delaware, United States. Since opening in 1969, it has held at least two NASCAR races. In addition to NASCAR, the track also hosted USAC and the Verizon IndyCar Series. The track features one layout, a 1 mile (1.6 km) concrete oval, with 24° banking in the turns and 9° banking on the straights. The speedway was owned and operated by Dover Motorsports.

The track, nicknamed "The Monster Mile", was built in 1969 by Melvin Joseph of Melvin L. Joseph Construction Company, Inc., with an asphalt surface, but was replaced with concrete in 1995. Six years later in 2001, the track's capacity moved to 135,000 seats, making the track have the largest capacity of sports venue in the mid-Atlantic. In 2002, the name changed to Dover International Speedway from Dover Downs International Speedway after Dover Downs Gaming and Entertainment split, making Dover Motorsports. From 2007 to 2009, the speedway worked on an improvement project called "The Monster Makeover", which expanded facilities at the track and beautified the track. After the 2014 season, the track's capacity was reduced to 95,500 seats.

==== Entry list ====
- (i) denotes driver who are ineligible for series driver points.
- (R) denotes rookie driver.

No.	Driver	Team	Manufacturer
00	Landon Cassill (i)	StarCom Racing	Chevrolet
1	Kurt Busch	Chip Ganassi Racing	Chevrolet
2	Brad Keselowski	Team Penske	Ford
3	Austin Dillon	Richard Childress Racing	Chevrolet
4	Kevin Harvick	Stewart-Haas Racing	Ford
6	Ryan Newman	Roush Fenway Racing	Ford
8	Daniel Hemric (R)	Richard Childress Racing	Chevrolet
9	Chase Elliott	Hendrick Motorsports	Chevrolet
10	Aric Almirola	Stewart-Haas Racing	Ford
11	Denny Hamlin	Joe Gibbs Racing	Toyota
12	Ryan Blaney	Team Penske	Ford
13	Ty Dillon	Germain Racing	Chevrolet
14	Clint Bowyer	Stewart-Haas Racing	Ford
15	Ross Chastain (i)	Premium Motorsports	Chevrolet
17	Ricky Stenhouse Jr.	Roush Fenway Racing	Ford
18	Kyle Busch	Joe Gibbs Racing	Toyota
19	Martin Truex Jr.	Joe Gibbs Racing	Toyota
20	Erik Jones	Joe Gibbs Racing	Toyota
21	Paul Menard	Wood Brothers Racing	Ford
22	Joey Logano	Team Penske	Ford
24	William Byron	Hendrick Motorsports	Chevrolet
27	Joe Nemechek (i)	Premium Motorsports	Chevrolet
32	Corey LaJoie	Go Fas Racing	Ford
34	Michael McDowell	Front Row Motorsports	Ford
36	Matt Tifft (R)	Front Row Motorsports	Ford
37	Chris Buescher	JTG Daugherty Racing	Chevrolet
38	David Ragan	Front Row Motorsports	Ford
41	Daniel Suárez	Stewart-Haas Racing	Ford
42	Kyle Larson	Chip Ganassi Racing	Chevrolet
43	Bubba Wallace	Richard Petty Motorsports	Chevrolet
47	Ryan Preece (R)	JTG Daugherty Racing	Chevrolet
48	Jimmie Johnson	Hendrick Motorsports	Chevrolet
51	B. J. McLeod (i)	Petty Ware Racing	Chevrolet
52	J. J. Yeley (i)	Rick Ware Racing	Ford
54	Garrett Smithley (i)	Rick Ware Racing	Ford
77	Reed Sorenson	Spire Motorsports	Chevrolet
88	Alex Bowman	Hendrick Motorsports	Chevrolet
95	Matt DiBenedetto	Leavine Family Racing	Toyota
Official entry list

== Practice ==
=== First practice ===
Joey Logano was the fastest in the first practice session with a time of 22.056 seconds and a speed of 163.221 mph (262.679 km/h).

Pos	No.	Driver	Team	Manufacturer	Time	Speed
1	22	Joey Logano	Team Penske	Ford	22.056	163.221
2	24	William Byron	Hendrick Motorsports	Chevrolet	22.204	162.133
3	48	Jimmie Johnson	Hendrick Motorsports	Chevrolet	22.245	161.834
Official first practice results

=== Final practice ===
Kyle Larson was the fastest in the final practice session with a time of 22.126 seconds and a speed of 162.705 mph (261.848 km/h).

Pos	No.	Driver	Team	Manufacturer	Time	Speed
1	42	Kyle Larson	Chip Ganassi Racing	Chevrolet	22.126	162.705
2	19	Martin Truex Jr.	Joe Gibbs Racing	Toyota	22.308	161.377
3	4	Kevin Harvick	Stewart-Haas Racing	Ford	22.436	160.456
Official final practice results

== Qualifying ==
Denny Hamlin scored the pole for the race with a time of 21.559 and a speed of 166.984 mph (268.735 km/h).

=== Qualifying results ===
Pos	No.	Driver	Team	Manufacturer	Time
1	11	Denny Hamlin	Joe Gibbs Racing	Toyota	21.559
2	42	Kyle Larson	Chip Ganassi Racing	Chevrolet	21.562
3	19	Martin Truex Jr.	Joe Gibbs Racing	Toyota	21.660
4	4	Kevin Harvick	Stewart-Haas Racing	Ford	21.687
5	9	Chase Elliott	Hendrick Motorsports	Chevrolet	21.695
6	24	William Byron	Hendrick Motorsports	Chevrolet	21.721
7	10	Aric Almirola	Stewart-Haas Racing	Ford	21.730
8	20	Erik Jones	Joe Gibbs Racing	Toyota	21.737
9	1	Kurt Busch	Chip Ganassi Racing	Chevrolet	21.767
10	12	Ryan Blaney	Team Penske	Ford	21.781
11	48	Jimmie Johnson	Hendrick Motorsports	Chevrolet	21.782
12	88	Alex Bowman	Hendrick Motorsports	Chevrolet	21.838
13	21	Paul Menard	Wood Brothers Racing	Ford	21.858
14	22	Joey Logano	Team Penske	Ford	21.859
15	41	Daniel Suárez	Stewart-Haas Racing	Ford	21.866
16	2	Brad Keselowski	Team Penske	Ford	21.897
17	14	Clint Bowyer	Stewart-Haas Racing	Ford	21.901
18	18	Kyle Busch	Joe Gibbs Racing	Toyota	21.932
19	17	Ricky Stenhouse Jr.	Roush Fenway Racing	Ford	21.975
20	95	Matt DiBenedetto	Leavine Family Racing	Toyota	21.977
21	38	David Ragan	Front Row Motorsports	Ford	22.031
22	37	Chris Buescher	JTG Daugherty Racing	Chevrolet	22.088
23	36	Matt Tifft (R)	Front Row Motorsports	Ford	22.113
24	6	Ryan Newman	Roush Fenway Racing	Ford	22.127
25	13	Ty Dillon	Germain Racing	Chevrolet	22.132
26	43	Bubba Wallace	Richard Petty Motorsports	Chevrolet	22.137
27	3	Austin Dillon	Richard Childress Racing	Chevrolet	22.171
28	34	Michael McDowell	Front Row Motorsports	Ford	22.228
29	32	Corey LaJoie	Go Fas Racing	Ford	22.320
30	00	Landon Cassill (i)	StarCom Racing	Chevrolet	22.325
31	8	Daniel Hemric (R)	Richard Childress Racing	Chevrolet	22.363
32	47	Ryan Preece (R)	JTG Daugherty Racing	Chevrolet	22.401
33	51	B. J. McLeod (i)	Petty Ware Racing	Chevrolet	22.721
34	15	Ross Chastain (i)	Premium Motorsports	Chevrolet	22.874
35	52	J. J. Yeley (i)	Rick Ware Racing	Ford	23.023
36	27	Joe Nemechek (i)	Premium Motorsports	Chevrolet	23.061
37	54	Garrett Smithley (i)	Rick Ware Racing	Ford	23.333
38	77	Reed Sorenson	Spire Motorsports	Chevrolet	23.359
Official qualifying results

== Race ==
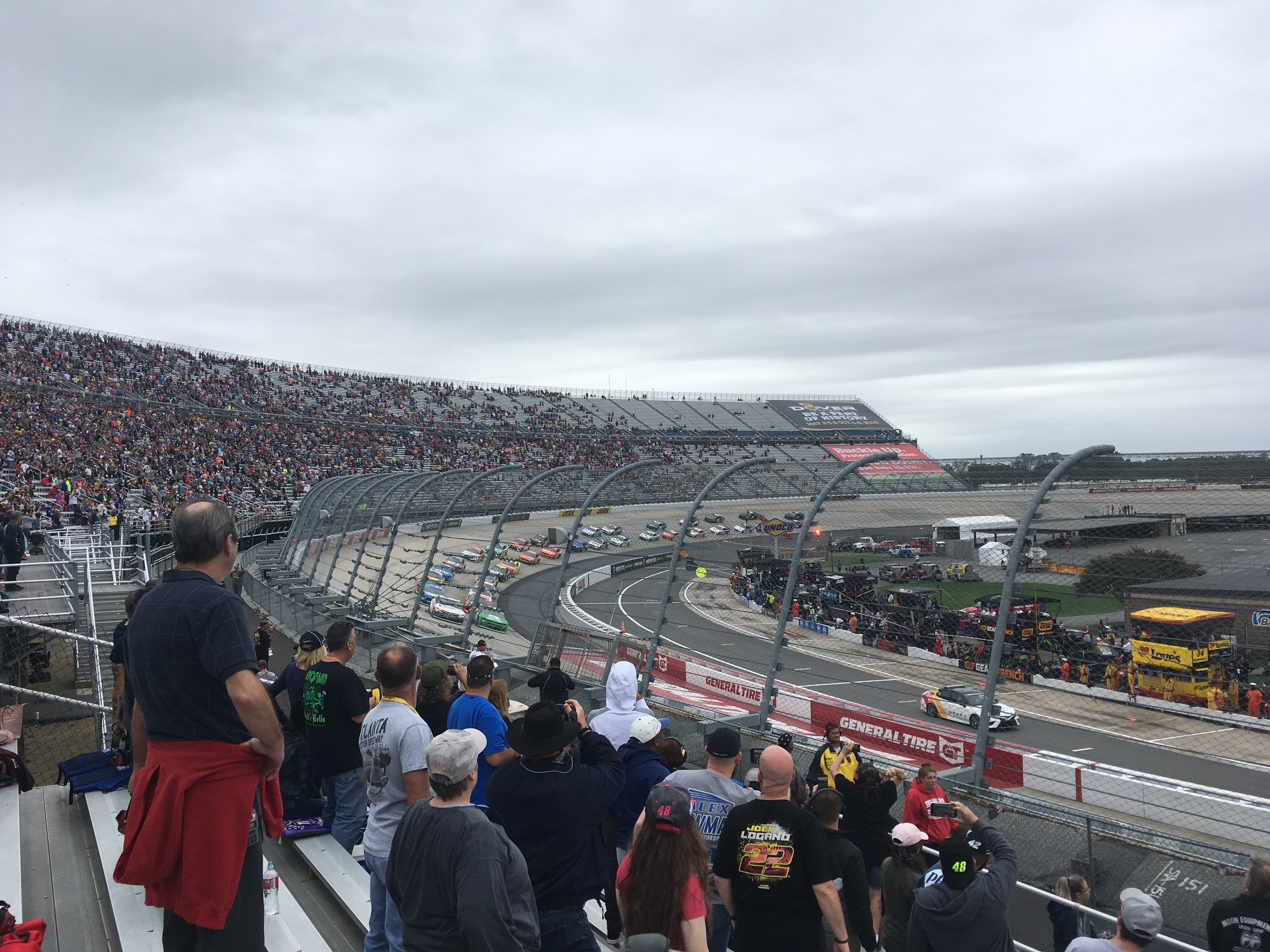
Denny Hamlin leads the field to the green flag

=== Stage results ===
Stage One Laps: 120

Pos	No	Driver	Team	Manufacturer	Points
1	11	Denny Hamlin	Joe Gibbs Racing	Toyota	10
2	19	Martin Truex Jr.	Joe Gibbs Racing	Toyota	9
3	42	Kyle Larson	Chip Ganassi Racing	Chevrolet	8
4	24	William Byron	Hendrick Motorsports	Chevrolet	7
5	4	Kevin Harvick	Stewart-Haas Racing	Ford	6
6	88	Alex Bowman	Hendrick Motorsports	Chevrolet	5
7	48	Jimmie Johnson	Hendrick Motorsports	Chevrolet	4
8	18	Kyle Busch	Joe Gibbs Racing	Toyota	3
9	20	Erik Jones	Joe Gibbs Racing	Toyota	2
10	12	Ryan Blaney	Team Penske	Ford	1
Official stage one results

Stage Two Laps: 120

Pos	No	Driver	Team	Manufacturer	Points
1	19	Martin Truex Jr.	Joe Gibbs Racing	Toyota	10
2	42	Kyle Larson	Chip Ganassi Racing	Chevrolet	9
3	11	Denny Hamlin	Joe Gibbs Racing	Toyota	8
4	4	Kevin Harvick	Stewart-Haas Racing	Ford	7
5	48	Jimmie Johnson	Hendrick Motorsports	Chevrolet	6
6	88	Alex Bowman	Hendrick Motorsports	Chevrolet	5
7	20	Erik Jones	Joe Gibbs Racing	Toyota	4
8	12	Ryan Blaney	Team Penske	Ford	3
9	2	Brad Keselowski	Team Penske	Ford	2
10	14	Clint Bowyer	Stewart-Haas Racing	Ford	1
Official stage two results

=== Final stage results ===
Stage Three Laps: 160

Pos	Grid	No	Driver	Team	Manufacturer	Laps	Points
1	2	42	Kyle Larson	Chip Ganassi Racing	Chevrolet	400	57
2	3	19	Martin Truex Jr.	Joe Gibbs Racing	Toyota	400	54
3	12	88	Alex Bowman	Hendrick Motorsports	Chevrolet	400	44
4	4	4	Kevin Harvick	Stewart-Haas Racing	Ford	400	46
5	1	11	Denny Hamlin	Joe Gibbs Racing	Toyota	400	50
6	18	18	Kyle Busch	Joe Gibbs Racing	Toyota	400	34
7	20	95	Matt DiBenedetto	Leavine Family Racing	Toyota	400	30
8	11	48	Jimmie Johnson	Hendrick Motorsports	Chevrolet	400	39
9	9	1	Kurt Busch	Chip Ganassi Racing	Chevrolet	399	28
10	17	14	Clint Bowyer	Stewart-Haas Racing	Ford	399	28
11	16	2	Brad Keselowski	Team Penske	Ford	399	28
12	13	21	Paul Menard	Wood Brothers Racing	Ford	398	25
13	6	24	William Byron	Hendrick Motorsports	Chevrolet	398	31
14	15	41	Daniel Suárez	Stewart-Haas Racing	Ford	398	23
15	8	20	Erik Jones	Joe Gibbs Racing	Toyota	398	28
16	19	17	Ricky Stenhouse Jr.	Roush Fenway Racing	Ford	398	21
17	7	10	Aric Almirola	Stewart-Haas Racing	Ford	398	20
18	27	3	Austin Dillon	Richard Childress Racing	Chevrolet	398	19
19	32	47	Ryan Preece (R)	JTG Daugherty Racing	Chevrolet	396	18
20	26	43	Bubba Wallace	Richard Petty Motorsports	Chevrolet	395	17
21	31	8	Daniel Hemric (R)	Richard Childress Racing	Chevrolet	394	16
22	24	6	Ryan Newman	Roush Fenway Racing	Ford	393	15
23	25	13	Ty Dillon	Germain Racing	Chevrolet	393	14
24	28	34	Michael McDowell	Front Row Motorsports	Ford	391	13
25	23	36	Matt Tifft (R)	Front Row Motorsports	Ford	390	12
26	30	00	Landon Cassill (i)	StarCom Racing	Chevrolet	389	0
27	21	38	David Ragan	Front Row Motorsports	Ford	388	10
28	29	32	Corey LaJoie	Go Fas Racing	Ford	385	9
29	33	51	B. J. McLeod (i)	Petty Ware Racing	Chevrolet	382	0
30	36	27	Joe Nemechek (i)	Premium Motorsports	Chevrolet	381	0
31	34	15	Ross Chastain (i)	Premium Motorsports	Chevrolet	380	0
32	35	52	J. J. Yeley (i)	Rick Ware Racing	Ford	380	0
33	37	54	Garrett Smithley (i)	Rick Ware Racing	Ford	377	0
34	14	22	Joey Logano	Team Penske	Ford	375	3
35	10	12	Ryan Blaney	Team Penske	Ford	297	6
36	22	37	Chris Buescher	JTG Daugherty Racing	Chevrolet	232	1
37	38	77	Reed Sorenson	Spire Motorsports	Chevrolet	180	1
38	5	9	Chase Elliott	Hendrick Motorsports	Chevrolet	8	1
Official race results

=== Race statistics ===
- Lead changes: 14 among 9 different drivers
- Cautions/Laps: 3 for 17
- Red flags: 0
- Time of race: 2 hours, 56 minutes and 49 seconds
- Average speed: 135.734 miles per hour (218.443 km/h)

== Media ==
=== Television ===
NBC Sports covered the race on the television side. Rick Allen, 2006 race winner Jeff Burton, Steve Letarte and 2001 race winner Dale Earnhardt Jr. had the call in the booth for the race. Dave Burns, Marty Snider and Kelli Stavast reported from pit lane during the race.

NBCSN
Booth announcers	Pit reporters
Lap-by-lap: Rick Allen; Color-commentator: Jeff Burton; Color-commentator: Steve Letarte; Color-commentator: Dale Earnhardt Jr.	Dave Burns; Marty Snider; Kelli Stavast

=== Radio ===
MRN had the radio call for the race, which was simulcast on Sirius XM NASCAR Radio. Alex Hayden, Jeff Striegle and 3 time Dover winner Rusty Wallace had the call for MRN when the field raced down the front straightaway. Mike Bagley called the race from a platform outside turn 3 when the field raced down the back straightaway. Winston Kelley, Steve Post, and Kim Coon called the race for MRN from pit lane.

MRN
Booth announcers	Turn announcers	Pit reporters
Lead announcer: Alex Hayden; Announcer: Jeff Striegle; Announcer: Rusty Wallace	Backstretch: Mike Bagley	Winston Kelley; Steve Post; Kim Coon

== Standings after the race ==
	Pos	Driver	Points
1	1	Martin Truex Jr.	3,095
1	2	Denny Hamlin	3,080 (–15)
2	3	Kyle Busch	3,080 (–15)
1	4	Kevin Harvick	3,074 (–21)
3	5	Kyle Larson	3,063 (–32)
1	6	Brad Keselowski	3,052 (–43)
2	7	Alex Bowman	3,049 (–46)
3	8	William Byron	3,032 (–63)
5	9	Joey Logano	3,032 (–63)
2	10	Clint Bowyer	3,028 (–67)
5	11	Chase Elliott	3,025 (–70)
2	12	Ryan Blaney	3,010 (–85)
	13	Aric Almirola	2,101 (–994)
	14	Ryan Newman	2,085 (–1,010)
	15	Kurt Busch	2,084 (–1,011)
	16	Erik Jones	2,037 (–1,058)
Official driver's standings

Manufacturers' Championship standings

Pos	Manufacturer	Points
1	Toyota	1,093
2	Ford	1,058 (–35)
3	Chevrolet	1,027 (–66)

- Note: Only the first 16 positions are included for the driver standings.

Previous race: 2019 Bank of America Roval 400	Monster Energy NASCAR Cup Series; 2019 season	Next race: 2019 1000Bulbs.com 500
