= 2019 Folds of Honor QuikTrip 500 =

Second race of the 2019 Monster Energy Cup Series

Race details
- Race 2 of 36 in the 2019 Monster Energy NASCAR Cup Series
- Date: February 24, 2019
- Location: Atlanta Motor Speedway in Hampton, Georgia
- Course: Permanent racing facility
- Course length: 1.54 miles (2.48 km)
- Distance: 325 laps, 500.5 mi (806 km)
- Average speed: 142.626 miles per hour (229.534 km/h)

Pole position
Driver	Aric Almirola	Stewart-Haas Racing
- Time: 30.550

Most laps led
Driver	Kyle Larson	Chip Ganassi Racing
- Laps: 142

Winner
No. 2	Brad Keselowski	Team Penske

Television in the United States
- Network: Fox
- Announcers: Mike Joy, Jeff Gordon and Darrell Waltrip
- Nielsen ratings: 5.067 million

Radio in the United States
- Radio: PRN
- Booth announcers: Doug Rice and Mark Garrow
- Turn announcers: Rob Albright (1 & 2) and Pat Patterson (3 & 4)

The 2019 Folds of Honor QuikTrip 500 was a Monster Energy NASCAR Cup Series race that was held on February 24, 2019, at Atlanta Motor Speedway in Hampton, Georgia. Contested over 325 laps on the 1.54-mile-long (2.48 km) asphalt quad-oval intermediate speedway, it was the second race of the 2019 Monster Energy NASCAR Cup Series season.

== Report ==
=== Background ===
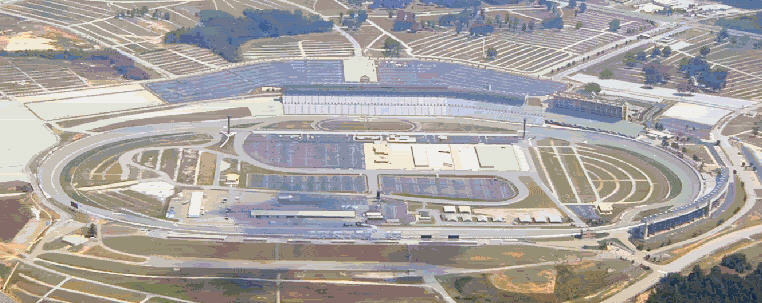
Atlanta Motor Speedway, the track where the race was held.

Atlanta Motor Speedway (formerly Atlanta International Raceway) is a track in Hampton, Georgia, 20 miles (32 km) south of Atlanta. It is a 1.54-mile (2.48 km) quad-oval track with a seating capacity of 111,000. It opened in 1960 as a 1.5-mile (2.4 km) standard oval. In 1994, 46 condominiums were built over the northeastern side of the track. In 1997, to standardize the track with Speedway Motorsports' other two 1.5-mile (2.4 km) ovals, the entire track was almost completely rebuilt. The frontstretch and backstretch were swapped, and the configuration of the track was changed from oval to quad-oval. The project made the track one of the fastest on the NASCAR circuit.

==== Entry list ====
No.	Driver	Team	Manufacturer
00	Landon Cassill	StarCom Racing	Chevrolet
1	Kurt Busch	Chip Ganassi Racing	Chevrolet
2	Brad Keselowski	Team Penske	Ford
3	Austin Dillon	Richard Childress Racing	Chevrolet
4	Kevin Harvick	Stewart-Haas Racing	Ford
6	Ryan Newman	Roush Fenway Racing	Ford
8	Daniel Hemric (R)	Richard Childress Racing	Chevrolet
9	Chase Elliott	Hendrick Motorsports	Chevrolet
10	Aric Almirola	Stewart-Haas Racing	Ford
11	Denny Hamlin	Joe Gibbs Racing	Toyota
12	Ryan Blaney	Team Penske	Ford
13	Ty Dillon	Germain Racing	Chevrolet
14	Clint Bowyer	Stewart-Haas Racing	Ford
15	Ross Chastain (i)	Premium Motorsports	Chevrolet
17	Ricky Stenhouse Jr.	Roush Fenway Racing	Ford
18	Kyle Busch	Joe Gibbs Racing	Toyota
19	Martin Truex Jr.	Joe Gibbs Racing	Toyota
20	Erik Jones	Joe Gibbs Racing	Toyota
21	Paul Menard	Wood Brothers Racing	Ford
22	Joey Logano	Team Penske	Ford
24	William Byron	Hendrick Motorsports	Chevrolet
32	Corey LaJoie	Go Fas Racing	Ford
34	Michael McDowell	Front Row Motorsports	Ford
36	Matt Tifft (R)	Front Row Motorsports	Ford
37	Chris Buescher	JTG Daugherty Racing	Chevrolet
38	David Ragan	Front Row Motorsports	Ford
41	Daniel Suárez	Stewart-Haas Racing	Ford
42	Kyle Larson	Chip Ganassi Racing	Chevrolet
43	Bubba Wallace	Richard Petty Motorsports	Chevrolet
47	Ryan Preece (R)	JTG Daugherty Racing	Chevrolet
48	Jimmie Johnson	Hendrick Motorsports	Chevrolet
51	Cody Ware (R)	Petty Ware Racing	Ford
52	B. J. McLeod (i)	Rick Ware Racing	Chevrolet
77	Garrett Smithley (i)	Spire Motorsports	Chevrolet
88	Alex Bowman	Hendrick Motorsports	Chevrolet
95	Matt DiBenedetto	Leavine Family Racing	Toyota
96	Parker Kligerman (i)	Gaunt Brothers Racing	Toyota
Official entry list

== First practice ==
Clint Bowyer was the fastest in the first practice session with a time of 30.774 seconds and a speed of 180.152 mph (289.927 km/h).

Pos	No.	Driver	Team	Manufacturer	Time	Speed
1	14	Clint Bowyer	Stewart-Haas Racing	Ford	30.774	180.152
2	10	Aric Almirola	Stewart-Haas Racing	Ford	30.802	179.988
3	3	Austin Dillon	Richard Childress Racing	Chevrolet	30.839	179.772
Official first practice results

== Qualifying ==
Aric Almirola scored the pole for the race with a time of 30.550 and a speed of 181.473 mph (292.052 km/h).

=== Qualifying results ===
Pos	No.	Driver	Team	Manufacturer	R1	R2	R3
1	10	Aric Almirola	Stewart-Haas Racing	Ford	30.838	30.772	30.550
2	17	Ricky Stenhouse Jr.	Roush Fenway Racing	Ford	31.024	30.827	30.727
3	14	Clint Bowyer	Stewart-Haas Racing	Ford	30.675	30.714	30.730
4	11	Denny Hamlin	Joe Gibbs Racing	Toyota	30.929	30.837	30.744
5	41	Daniel Suárez	Stewart-Haas Racing	Ford	30.978	30.746	30.763
6	18	Kyle Busch	Joe Gibbs Racing	Toyota	30.956	30.845	30.810
7	42	Kyle Larson	Chip Ganassi Racing	Chevrolet	30.878	30.812	30.827
8	1	Kurt Busch	Chip Ganassi Racing	Chevrolet	30.918	30.832	30.835
9	19	Martin Truex Jr.	Joe Gibbs Racing	Toyota	31.018	30.877	30.852
10	3	Austin Dillon	Richard Childress Racing	Chevrolet	30.886	30.845	30.869
11	48	Jimmie Johnson	Hendrick Motorsports	Chevrolet	30.947	30.882	30.900
12	34	Michael McDowell	Front Row Motorsports	Ford	30.930	30.803	30.915
13	6	Ryan Newman	Roush Fenway Racing	Ford	30.845	30.906	—
14	21	Paul Menard	Wood Brothers Racing	Ford	31.072	30.908	—
15	20	Erik Jones	Joe Gibbs Racing	Toyota	30.903	30.929	—
16	88	Alex Bowman	Hendrick Motorsports	Chevrolet	31.010	30.952	—
17	24	William Byron	Hendrick Motorsports	Chevrolet	30.958	30.979	—
18	4	Kevin Harvick	Stewart-Haas Racing	Ford	31.000	30.991	—
19	2	Brad Keselowski	Team Penske	Ford	31.047	30.998	—
20	95	Matt DiBenedetto	Leavine Family Racing	Toyota	31.073	31.029	—
21	13	Ty Dillon	Germain Racing	Chevrolet	31.031	31.048	—
22	9	Chase Elliott	Hendrick Motorsports	Chevrolet	31.079	31.061	—
23	38	David Ragan	Front Row Motorsports	Ford	31.095	31.111	—
24	32	Corey LaJoie	Go Fas Racing	Ford	30.969	31.148	—
25	47	Ryan Preece (R)	JTG Daugherty Racing	Chevrolet	31.097	—	—
26	12	Ryan Blaney	Team Penske	Ford	31.119	—	—
27	22	Joey Logano	Team Penske	Ford	31.145	—	—
28	8	Daniel Hemric (R)	Richard Childress Racing	Chevrolet	31.156	—	—
29	43	Bubba Wallace	Richard Petty Motorsports	Chevrolet	31.196	—	—
30	37	Chris Buescher	JTG Daugherty Racing	Chevrolet	31.323	—	—
31	36	Matt Tifft (R)	Front Row Motorsports	Ford	31.376	—	—
32	15	Ross Chastain (i)	Premium Motorsports	Chevrolet	31.502	—	—
33	00	Landon Cassill	StarCom Racing	Chevrolet	31.512	—	—
34	96	Parker Kligerman (i)	Gaunt Brothers Racing	Toyota	31.534	—	—
35	77	Garrett Smithley (i)	Spire Motorsports	Chevrolet	32.598	—	—
36	51	Cody Ware (R)	Petty Ware Racing	Ford	32.950	—	—
37	52	B. J. McLeod (i)	Rick Ware Racing	Chevrolet	0.000	—	—
Official qualifying results

== Final practice ==
Clint Bowyer was the fastest in the final practice session with a time of 30.954 seconds and a speed of 179.104 mph (288.240 km/h).

Pos	No.	Driver	Team	Manufacturer	Time	Speed
1	14	Clint Bowyer	Stewart-Haas Racing	Ford	30.954	179.104
2	18	Kyle Busch	Joe Gibbs Racing	Toyota	30.994	178.873
3	3	Austin Dillon	Richard Childress Racing	Chevrolet	31.022	178.712
Official final practice results

== Race ==
=== Stage Results ===
Stage One

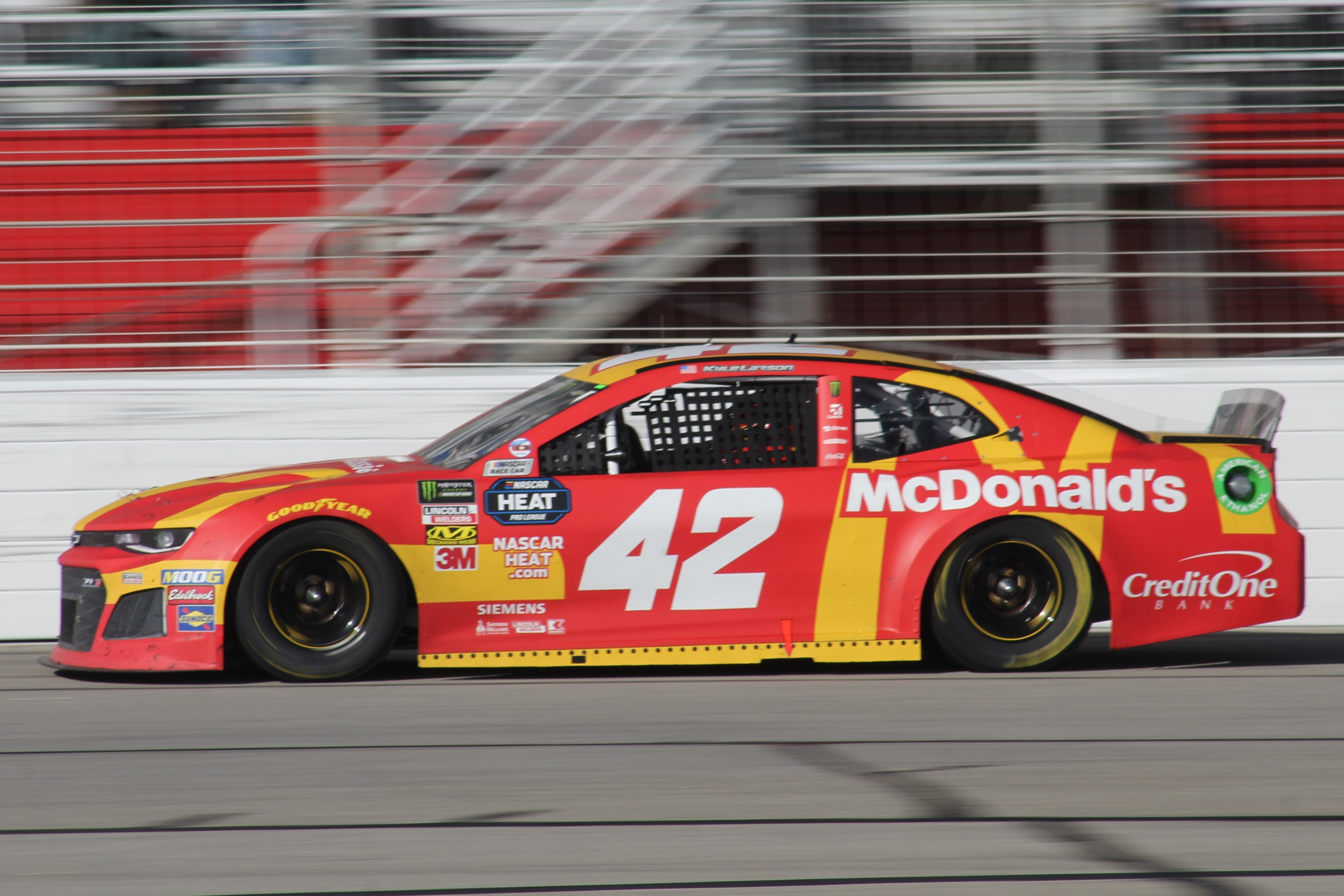
Kyle Larson won the first stage.

Laps: 85

Pos	No	Driver	Team	Manufacturer	Points
1	42	Kyle Larson	Chip Ganassi Racing	Chevrolet	10
2	4	Kevin Harvick	Stewart-Haas Racing	Ford	9
3	10	Aric Almirola	Stewart-Haas Racing	Ford	8
4	1	Kurt Busch	Chip Ganassi Racing	Chevrolet	7
5	19	Martin Truex Jr.	Joe Gibbs Racing	Toyota	6
6	12	Ryan Blaney	Team Penske	Ford	5
7	22	Joey Logano	Team Penske	Ford	4
8	11	Denny Hamlin	Joe Gibbs Racing	Toyota	3
9	17	Ricky Stenhouse Jr.	Roush Fenway Racing	Ford	2
10	14	Clint Bowyer	Stewart-Haas Racing	Ford	1
Official stage one results

Stage Two

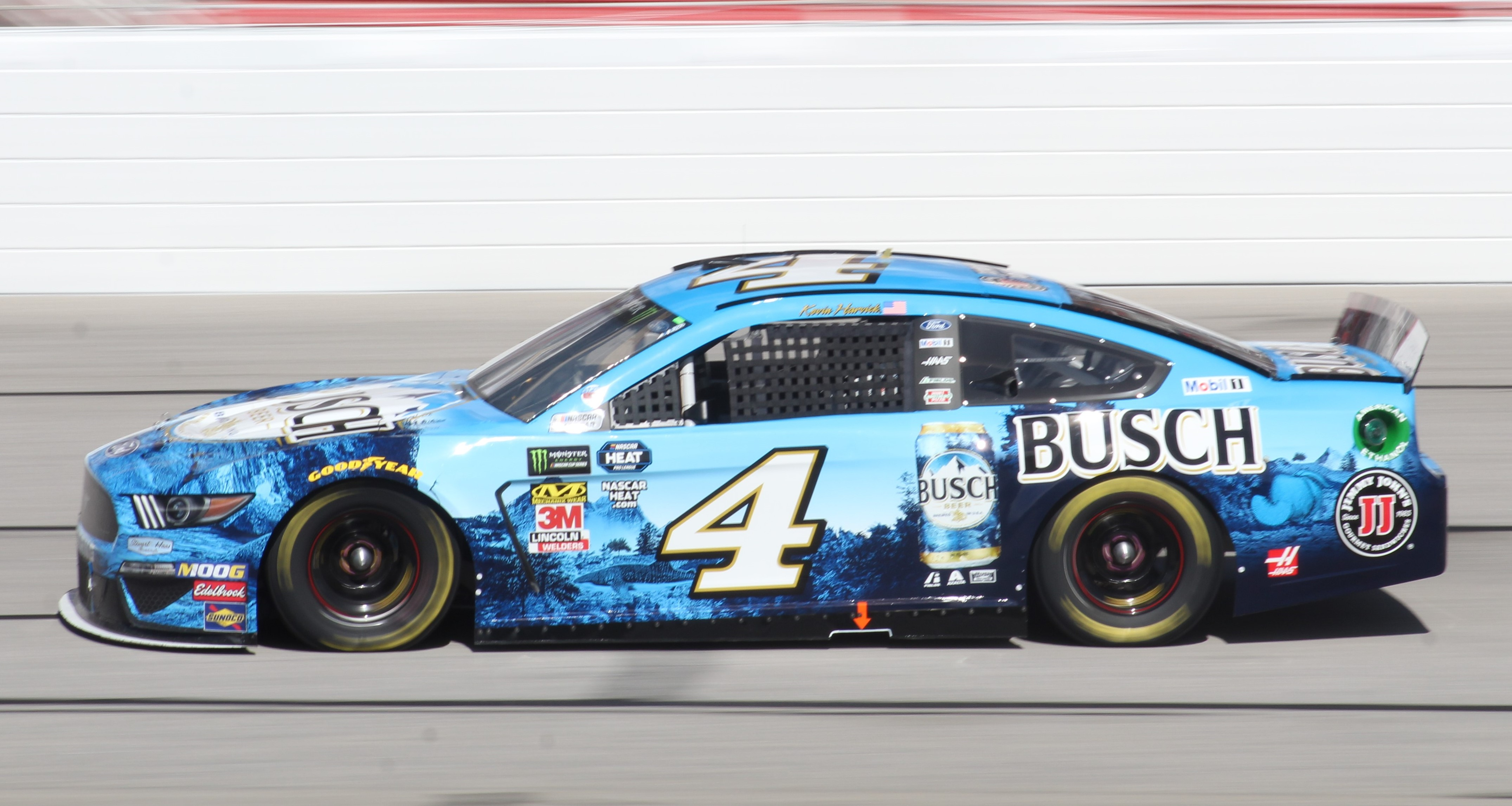
Kevin Harvick won the second stage.

Laps: 85

Pos	No	Driver	Team	Manufacturer	Points
1	4	Kevin Harvick	Stewart-Haas Racing	Ford	10
2	42	Kyle Larson	Chip Ganassi Racing	Chevrolet	9
3	19	Martin Truex Jr.	Joe Gibbs Racing	Toyota	8
4	12	Ryan Blaney	Team Penske	Ford	7
5	11	Denny Hamlin	Joe Gibbs Racing	Toyota	6
6	22	Joey Logano	Team Penske	Ford	5
7	1	Kurt Busch	Chip Ganassi Racing	Chevrolet	4
8	20	Erik Jones	Joe Gibbs Racing	Toyota	3
9	18	Kyle Busch	Joe Gibbs Racing	Toyota	2
10	14	Clint Bowyer	Stewart-Haas Racing	Ford	1
Official stage two results

=== Final Stage Results ===
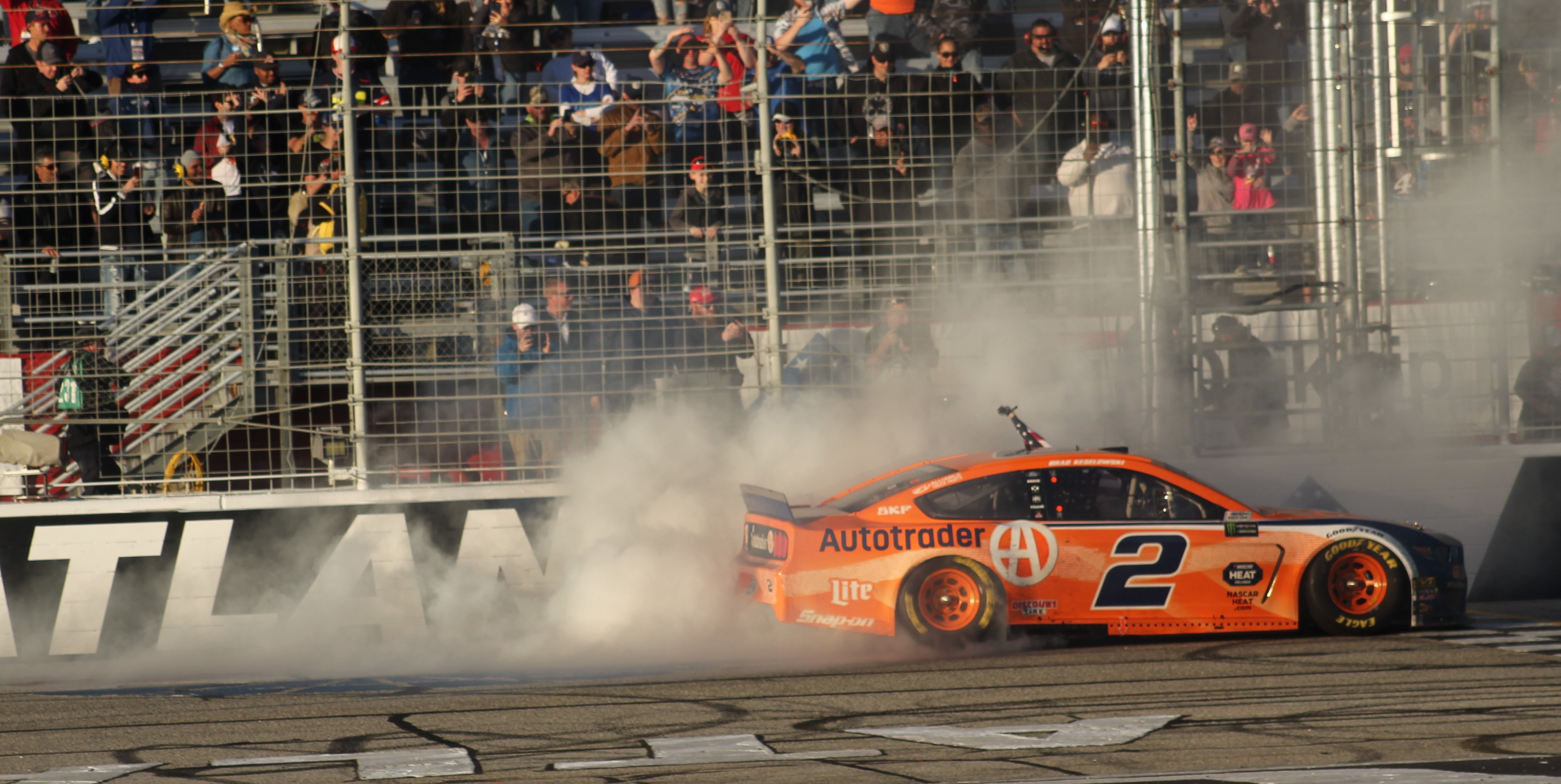
Brad Keselowski celebrating victory lap.

Stage Three Laps: 155

Pos	Grid	No	Driver	Team	Manufacturer	Laps	Points
1	19	2	Brad Keselowski	Team Penske	Ford	325	40
2	9	19	Martin Truex Jr.	Joe Gibbs Racing	Toyota	325	49
3	8	1	Kurt Busch	Chip Ganassi Racing	Chevrolet	325	45
4	18	4	Kevin Harvick	Stewart-Haas Racing	Ford	325	52
5	3	14	Clint Bowyer	Stewart-Haas Racing	Ford	325	34
6	6	18	Kyle Busch	Joe Gibbs Racing	Toyota	325	33
7	15	20	Erik Jones	Joe Gibbs Racing	Toyota	325	33
8	1	10	Aric Almirola	Stewart-Haas Racing	Ford	325	37
9	30	37	Chris Buescher	JTG Daugherty Racing	Chevrolet	325	28
10	5	41	Daniel Suárez	Stewart-Haas Racing	Ford	325	27
11	4	11	Denny Hamlin	Joe Gibbs Racing	Toyota	325	35
12	7	42	Kyle Larson	Chip Ganassi Racing	Chevrolet	325	44
13	13	6	Ryan Newman	Roush Fenway Racing	Ford	325	24
14	14	21	Paul Menard	Wood Brothers Racing	Ford	325	23
15	16	88	Alex Bowman	Hendrick Motorsports	Chevrolet	325	22
16	23	38	David Ragan	Front Row Motorsports	Ford	325	21
17	17	24	William Byron	Hendrick Motorsports	Chevrolet	325	20
18	2	17	Ricky Stenhouse Jr.	Roush Fenway Racing	Ford	324	21
19	22	9	Chase Elliott	Hendrick Motorsports	Chevrolet	324	18
20	28	8	Daniel Hemric (R)	Richard Childress Racing	Chevrolet	324	17
21	10	3	Austin Dillon	Richard Childress Racing	Chevrolet	324	16
22	26	12	Ryan Blaney	Team Penske	Ford	324	27
23	27	22	Joey Logano	Team Penske	Ford	324	23
24	11	48	Jimmie Johnson	Hendrick Motorsports	Chevrolet	323	13
25	21	13	Ty Dillon	Germain Racing	Chevrolet	323	12
26	20	95	Matt DiBenedetto	Leavine Family Racing	Toyota	322	11
27	29	43	Bubba Wallace	Richard Petty Motorsports	Chevrolet	322	10
28	31	36	Matt Tifft (R)	Front Row Motorsports	Ford	319	9
29	24	32	Corey LaJoie	Go Fas Racing	Ford	319	8
30	34	96	Parker Kligerman (i)	Gaunt Brothers Racing	Toyota	318	0
31	32	15	Ross Chastain (i)	Premium Motorsports	Chevrolet	313	0
32	37	52	B. J. McLeod (i)	Rick Ware Racing	Chevrolet	313	0
33	36	51	Cody Ware (R)	Petty Ware Racing	Ford	303	4
34	33	00	Landon Cassill	StarCom Racing	Chevrolet	284	3
35	25	47	Ryan Preece (R)	JTG Daugherty Racing	Chevrolet	271	2
36	35	77	Garrett Smithley (i)	Spire Motorsports	Chevrolet	254	0
37	12	34	Michael McDowell	Front Row Motorsports	Ford	222	1
Official race results

=== Race statistics ===
- Lead changes: 26 among 9 different drivers
- Cautions/Laps: 5 for 30
- Red flags: 0
- Time of race: 3 hours, 30 minutes and 33 seconds
- Average speed: 142.626 miles per hour (229.534 km/h)

== Media ==
=== Television ===
The Folds of Honor QuikTrip 500 was carried by Fox in the United States. Mike Joy, five-time Atlanta winner Jeff Gordon and three-time Atlanta winner Darrell Waltrip covered the race from the booth. Pit road was manned by Jamie Little, Vince Welch and Matt Yocum.

Fox
Booth announcers	Pit reporters
Lap-by-lap: Mike Joy; Color commentator: Jeff Gordon; Color commentator: Darrell Waltrip	Jamie Little; Vince Welch; Matt Yocum

=== Radio ===
The race was broadcast on radio by the Performance Racing Network and simulcast on Sirius XM NASCAR Radio. Doug Rice and Mark Garrow called the race from the booth when the field down the front stretch. Rob Albright called the race from atop a billboard outside of turn 2 when the field raced through turns 1 and 2 & Pat Patterson called the race from a billboard outside of turn 3 when the field raced through turns 3 and 4. On pit road, PRN was manned by Brad Gillie, Brett McMillan, Wendy Venturini and Doug Turnbull.

PRN
Booth announcers	Turn announcers	Pit reporters
Lead announcer: Doug Rice; Announcer: Mark Garrow	Turns 1 & 2: Rob Albright; Turns 3 & 4: Pat Patterson	Brad Gillie; Brett McMillan; Wendy Venturini; Doug Turnbull

== Standings after the race ==
Drivers' Championship standings

	Pos	Driver	Points
	1	Denny Hamlin	87
12	2	Kevin Harvick	79 (–8)
	3	Kyle Busch	78 (–9)
3	4	Kyle Larson	77 (–10)
3	5	Joey Logano	75 (–12)
5	6	Brad Keselowski	72 (–15)
2	7	Erik Jones	68 (–19)
16	8	Kurt Busch	63 (–24)
7	9	Clint Bowyer	60 (–27)
6	10	Ricky Stenhouse Jr.	60 (–27)
10	11	Aric Almirola	58 (–29)
16	12	Martin Truex Jr.	57 (–30)
7	13	Alex Bowman	57 (–30)
1	14	Ryan Blaney	54 (–33)
2	15	Ryan Newman	49 (–38)
8	16	Jimmie Johnson	46 (–41)
Official driver's standings

Manufacturers' Championship standings

Pos	Manufacturer	Points
1	Toyota	75
2	Ford	73 (–2)
3	Chevrolet	65 (–10)

- Note: Only the first 16 positions are included for the driver standings.

Previous race: 2019 Daytona 500	Monster Energy NASCAR Cup Series; 2019 season	Next race: 2019 Pennzoil 400
