= 2019 Hollywood Casino 400 =

Race details
- Race 32 of 36 in the 2019 Monster Energy NASCAR Cup Series
- Date: October 20, 2019
- Location: Kansas Speedway in Kansas City, Kansas
- Course: Permanent racing facility
- Course length: 1.5 miles (2.4 km)
- Distance: 277 laps, 415.5 mi (664.8 km)
- Scheduled distance: 267 laps, 400.5 mi (640.8 km)
- Average speed: 136.491 miles per hour (219.661 km/h)

Pole position
Driver	Daniel Hemric	Richard Childress Racing
- Time: 30.329

Most laps led
Driver	Denny Hamlin	Joe Gibbs Racing
- Laps: 153

Winner
No. 11	Denny Hamlin	Joe Gibbs Racing

Television in the United States
- Network: NBC
- Announcers: Rick Allen, Jeff Burton, Steve Letarte and Dale Earnhardt Jr.
- Nielsen ratings: 3.304 million

Radio in the United States
- Radio: MRN
- Booth announcers: Alex Hayden, Jeff Striegle and Rusty Wallace
- Turn announcers: Dave Moody (1 & 2) and Mike Bagley (3 & 4)

The 2019 Hollywood Casino 400 was a Monster Energy NASCAR Cup Series race held on October 20, 2019, at Kansas Speedway in Kansas City, Kansas. Contested over 277 laps—extended from 267 laps due to an overtime finish, on the 1.5 mi (2.4 km) intermediate speedway, it was the 32nd race of the 2019 Monster Energy NASCAR Cup Series season, sixth race of the Playoffs, and final race of the Round of 12.

== Report ==
=== Background ===
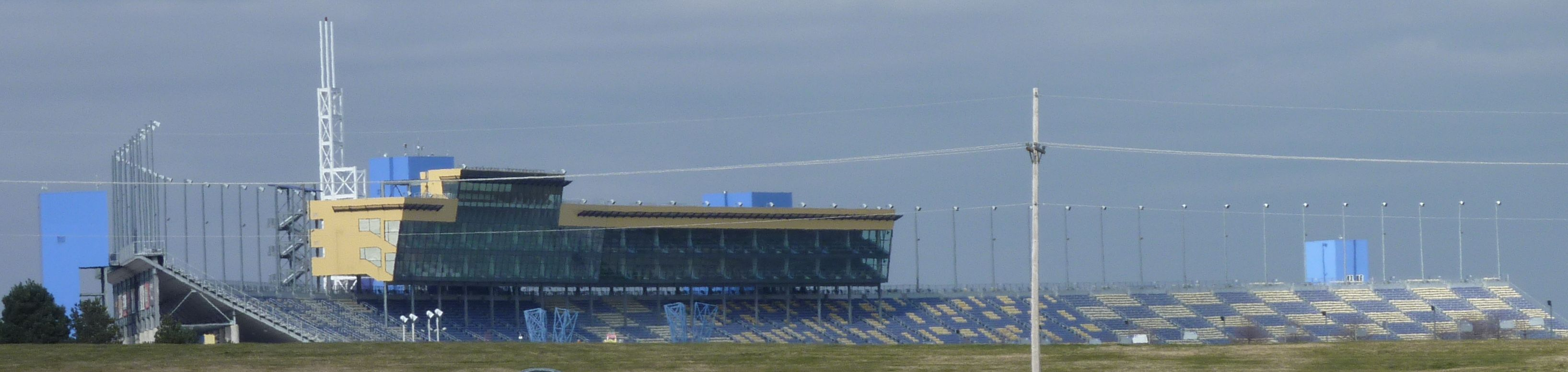
Kansas Speedway, the track where the race was held.

Kansas Speedway is a 1.5-mile (2.4 km) tri-oval race track in Kansas City, Kansas. It was built in 2001 and it currently hosts two annual NASCAR race weekends. The Verizon IndyCar Series also raced at here until 2011. The speedway is owned and operated by the International Speedway Corporation.

==== Entry list ====
- (i) denotes driver who are ineligible for series driver points.
- (R) denotes rookie driver.

No.	Driver	Team	Manufacturer
00	Landon Cassill (i)	StarCom Racing	Chevrolet
1	Kurt Busch	Chip Ganassi Racing	Chevrolet
2	Brad Keselowski	Team Penske	Ford
3	Austin Dillon	Richard Childress Racing	Chevrolet
4	Kevin Harvick	Stewart-Haas Racing	Ford
6	Ryan Newman	Roush Fenway Racing	Ford
8	Daniel Hemric (R)	Richard Childress Racing	Chevrolet
9	Chase Elliott	Hendrick Motorsports	Chevrolet
10	Aric Almirola	Stewart-Haas Racing	Ford
11	Denny Hamlin	Joe Gibbs Racing	Toyota
12	Ryan Blaney	Team Penske	Ford
13	Ty Dillon	Germain Racing	Chevrolet
14	Clint Bowyer	Stewart-Haas Racing	Ford
15	Ross Chastain (i)	Premium Motorsports	Chevrolet
17	Ricky Stenhouse Jr.	Roush Fenway Racing	Ford
18	Kyle Busch	Joe Gibbs Racing	Toyota
19	Martin Truex Jr.	Joe Gibbs Racing	Toyota
20	Erik Jones	Joe Gibbs Racing	Toyota
21	Paul Menard	Wood Brothers Racing	Ford
22	Joey Logano	Team Penske	Ford
24	William Byron	Hendrick Motorsports	Chevrolet
27	Reed Sorenson	Premium Motorsports	Chevrolet
32	Corey LaJoie	Go Fas Racing	Ford
34	Michael McDowell	Front Row Motorsports	Ford
36	Matt Tifft (R)	Front Row Motorsports	Ford
37	Chris Buescher	JTG Daugherty Racing	Chevrolet
38	David Ragan	Front Row Motorsports	Ford
41	Daniel Suárez	Stewart-Haas Racing	Ford
42	Kyle Larson	Chip Ganassi Racing	Chevrolet
43	Bubba Wallace	Richard Petty Motorsports	Chevrolet
47	Ryan Preece (R)	JTG Daugherty Racing	Chevrolet
48	Jimmie Johnson	Hendrick Motorsports	Chevrolet
51	J. J. Yeley (i)	Petty Ware Racing	Ford
52	Garrett Smithley (i)	Rick Ware Racing	Ford
53	Josh Bilicki (i)	Rick Ware Racing	Ford
66	Joey Gase (i)	MBM Motorsports	Toyota
77	Timmy Hill (i)	Spire Motorsports	Chevrolet
88	Alex Bowman	Hendrick Motorsports	Chevrolet
95	Matt DiBenedetto	Leavine Family Racing	Toyota
96	Parker Kligerman (i)	Gaunt Brothers Racing	Toyota
Official entry list

== Practice ==
=== First practice ===
Brad Keselowski was the fastest in the first practice session with a time of 30.595 seconds and a speed of 176.499 mph (284.048 km/h).

Pos	No.	Driver	Team	Manufacturer	Time	Speed
1	2	Brad Keselowski	Team Penske	Ford	30.595	176.499
2	10	Aric Almirola	Stewart-Haas Racing	Ford	30.614	176.390
3	41	Daniel Suárez	Stewart-Haas Racing	Ford	30.624	176.332
Official first practice results

=== Final practice ===
Daniel Hemric was the fastest in the final practice session with a time of 30.366 seconds and a speed of 177.830 mph (286.190 km/h).

Pos	No.	Driver	Team	Manufacturer	Time	Speed
1	8	Daniel Hemric (R)	Richard Childress Racing	Chevrolet	30.366	177.830
2	4	Kevin Harvick	Stewart-Haas Racing	Ford	30.492	177.096
3	1	Kurt Busch	Chip Ganassi Racing	Chevrolet	30.496	177.072
Official final practice results

== Qualifying ==
Daniel Hemric scored the pole for the race with a time of 30.329 and a speed of 178.047 mph (286.539 km/h).

=== Qualifying results ===
Pos	No.	Driver	Team	Manufacturer	Time
1	8	Daniel Hemric (R)	Richard Childress Racing	Chevrolet	30.329
2	38	David Ragan	Front Row Motorsports	Ford	30.364
3	12	Ryan Blaney	Team Penske	Ford	30.379
4	2	Brad Keselowski	Team Penske	Ford	30.394
5	42	Kyle Larson	Chip Ganassi Racing	Chevrolet	30.399
6	34	Michael McDowell	Front Row Motorsports	Ford	30.408
7	6	Ryan Newman	Roush Fenway Racing	Ford	30.423
8	41	Daniel Suárez	Stewart-Haas Racing	Ford	30.446
9	3	Austin Dillon	Richard Childress Racing	Chevrolet	30.448
10	43	Bubba Wallace	Richard Petty Motorsports	Chevrolet	30.452
11	19	Martin Truex Jr.	Joe Gibbs Racing	Toyota	30.464
12	48	Jimmie Johnson	Hendrick Motorsports	Chevrolet	30.465
13	10	Aric Almirola	Stewart-Haas Racing	Ford	30.476
14	9	Chase Elliott	Hendrick Motorsports	Chevrolet	30.497
15	1	Kurt Busch	Chip Ganassi Racing	Chevrolet	30.518
16	88	Alex Bowman	Hendrick Motorsports	Chevrolet	30.520
17	36	Matt Tifft (R)	Front Row Motorsports	Ford	30.544
18	18	Kyle Busch	Joe Gibbs Racing	Toyota	30.548
19	17	Ricky Stenhouse Jr.	Roush Fenway Racing	Ford	30.573
20	20	Erik Jones	Joe Gibbs Racing	Toyota	30.575
21	14	Clint Bowyer	Stewart-Haas Racing	Ford	30.605
22	21	Paul Menard	Wood Brothers Racing	Ford	30.612
23	11	Denny Hamlin	Joe Gibbs Racing	Toyota	30.631
24	13	Ty Dillon	Germain Racing	Chevrolet	30.634
25	24	William Byron	Hendrick Motorsports	Chevrolet	30.742
26	37	Chris Buescher	JTG Daugherty Racing	Chevrolet	30.803
27	95	Matt DiBenedetto	Leavine Family Racing	Toyota	30.879
28	47	Ryan Preece (R)	JTG Daugherty Racing	Chevrolet	30.880
29	22	Joey Logano	Team Penske	Ford	30.912
30	00	Landon Cassill (i)	StarCom Racing	Chevrolet	31.004
31	32	Corey LaJoie	Go Fas Racing	Ford	31.086
32	96	Parker Kligerman (i)	Gaunt Brothers Racing	Toyota	31.277
33	15	Ross Chastain (i)	Premium Motorsports	Chevrolet	31.365
34	27	Reed Sorenson	Premium Motorsports	Chevrolet	31.378
35	52	Garrett Smithley (i)	Rick Ware Racing	Ford	31.386
36	51	J. J. Yeley (i)	Petty Ware Racing	Ford	31.494
37	53	Josh Bilicki (i)	Rick Ware Racing	Ford	31.787
38	77	Timmy Hill (i)	Spire Motorsports	Chevrolet	32.079
39	66	Joey Gase (i)	MBM Motorsports	Toyota	33.190
40	4	Kevin Harvick	Stewart-Haas Racing	Ford	0.000
Official qualifying results

== Race ==
=== Stage results ===
Stage One Laps: 80

Pos	No	Driver	Team	Manufacturer	Points
1	22	Joey Logano	Team Penske	Ford	10
2	9	Chase Elliott	Hendrick Motorsports	Chevrolet	9
3	41	Daniel Suárez	Stewart-Haas Racing	Ford	8
4	19	Martin Truex Jr.	Joe Gibbs Racing	Toyota	7
5	18	Kyle Busch	Joe Gibbs Racing	Toyota	6
6	2	Brad Keselowski	Team Penske	Ford	5
7	12	Ryan Blaney	Team Penske	Ford	4
8	11	Denny Hamlin	Joe Gibbs Racing	Toyota	3
10	20	Erik Jones	Joe Gibbs Racing	Toyota	2
9	17	Ricky Stenhouse Jr.	Roush Fenway Racing	Ford	1
Official stage one results

Stage Two Laps: 80

Pos	No	Driver	Team	Manufacturer	Points
1	11	Denny Hamlin	Joe Gibbs Racing	Toyota	10
2	12	Ryan Blaney	Team Penske	Ford	9
3	19	Martin Truex Jr.	Joe Gibbs Racing	Toyota	8
4	24	William Byron	Hendrick Motorsports	Chevrolet	7
5	9	Chase Elliott	Hendrick Motorsports	Chevrolet	6
6	4	Kevin Harvick	Stewart-Haas Racing	Ford	5
7	22	Joey Logano	Team Penske	Ford	4
8	21	Paul Menard	Wood Brothers Racing	Ford	3
9	14	Clint Bowyer	Stewart-Haas Racing	Ford	2
10	18	Kyle Busch	Joe Gibbs Racing	Toyota	1
Official stage two results

=== Final stage results ===
Stage Three Laps: 107

Pos	Grid	No	Driver	Team	Manufacturer	Laps	Points
1	23	11	Denny Hamlin	Joe Gibbs Racing	Toyota	277	53
2	14	9	Chase Elliott	Hendrick Motorsports	Chevrolet	277	50
3	18	18	Kyle Busch	Joe Gibbs Racing	Toyota	277	41
4	15	1	Kurt Busch	Chip Ganassi Racing	Chevrolet	277	33
5	25	24	William Byron	Hendrick Motorsports	Chevrolet	277	39
6	11	19	Martin Truex Jr.	Joe Gibbs Racing	Toyota	277	46
7	20	20	Erik Jones	Joe Gibbs Racing	Toyota	277	32
8	21	14	Clint Bowyer	Stewart-Haas Racing	Ford	277	31
9	40	4	Kevin Harvick	Stewart-Haas Racing	Ford	277	33
10	12	48	Jimmie Johnson	Hendrick Motorsports	Chevrolet	277	27
11	16	88	Alex Bowman	Hendrick Motorsports	Chevrolet	277	26
12	28	47	Ryan Preece (R)	JTG Daugherty Racing	Chevrolet	277	25
13	26	37	Chris Buescher	JTG Daugherty Racing	Chevrolet	277	24
14	5	42	Kyle Larson	Chip Ganassi Racing	Chevrolet	277	23
15	27	95	Matt DiBenedetto	Leavine Family Racing	Toyota	277	22
16	19	17	Ricky Stenhouse Jr.	Roush Fenway Racing	Ford	277	22
17	29	22	Joey Logano	Team Penske	Ford	277	34
18	22	21	Paul Menard	Wood Brothers Racing	Ford	277	22
19	4	2	Brad Keselowski	Team Penske	Ford	277	23
20	9	3	Austin Dillon	Richard Childress Racing	Chevrolet	277	17
21	3	12	Ryan Blaney	Team Penske	Ford	277	29
22	24	13	Ty Dillon	Germain Racing	Chevrolet	276	15
23	13	10	Aric Almirola	Stewart-Haas Racing	Ford	274	14
24	6	34	Michael McDowell	Front Row Motorsports	Ford	274	13
25	17	36	Matt Tifft (R)	Front Row Motorsports	Ford	273	12
26	2	38	David Ragan	Front Row Motorsports	Ford	273	11
27	33	15	Ross Chastain (i)	Premium Motorsports	Chevrolet	272	0
28	31	32	Corey LaJoie	Go Fas Racing	Ford	272	9
29	32	96	Parker Kligerman (i)	Gaunt Brothers Racing	Toyota	271	0
30	36	51	J. J. Yeley (i)	Petty Ware Racing	Ford	271	0
31	1	8	Daniel Hemric (R)	Richard Childress Racing	Chevrolet	270	6
32	8	41	Daniel Suárez	Stewart-Haas Racing	Ford	270	13
33	34	27	Reed Sorenson	Premium Motorsports	Chevrolet	268	4
34	35	52	Garrett Smithley (i)	Rick Ware Racing	Ford	267	0
35	10	43	Bubba Wallace	Richard Petty Motorsports	Chevrolet	263	2
36	37	53	Josh Bilicki (i)	Rick Ware Racing	Ford	262	0
37	30	00	Landon Cassill (i)	StarCom Racing	Chevrolet	203	0
38	39	66	Joey Gase (i)	MBM Motorsports	Toyota	107	0
39	38	77	Timmy Hill (i)	Spire Motorsports	Chevrolet	95	0
40	7	6	Ryan Newman	Roush Fenway Racing	Ford	72	1
Official race results

=== Race statistics ===
- Lead changes: 15 among 12 different drivers
- Cautions/Laps: 7 for 32
- Red flags: 0
- Time of race: 3 hours, 2 minutes and 39 seconds
- Average speed: 136.491 miles per hour (219.661 km/h)

== Media ==
=== Television ===
NBC Sports covered the race on the television side. Rick Allen, Jeff Burton, Steve Letarte and Dale Earnhardt Jr. had the call in the booth for the race. Dave Burns, Marty Snider and Kelli Stavast reported from pit lane during the race.

NBC
Booth announcers	Pit reporters
Lap-by-lap: Rick Allen; Color-commentator: Jeff Burton; Color-commentator: Steve Letarte; Color-commentator: Dale Earnhardt Jr.	Dave Burns; Marty Snider; Kelli Stavast

=== Radio ===
MRN had the radio call for the race, which was simulcast on Sirius XM NASCAR Radio. Alex Hayden, Jeff Striegle and Rusty Wallace had the call of the race for MRN when the field raced thru the front straightaway. Dave Moody called the race for MRN from Turns 1 &2, and Mike Bagley called the race for MRN from turns 3 &4. Winston Kelley, Steve Post, Kim Coon, and Dillon Welch covered the action for MRN from pit lane.

MRN
Booth announcers	Turn announcers	Pit reporters
Lead announcer: Alex Hayden; Announcer: Jeff Striegle; Announcer: Rusty Wallace	Turns 1 & 2: Dave Moody; Turns 3 & 4: Mike Bagley	Winston Kelley; Steve Post; Kim Coon; Dillon Welch

== Standings after the race ==
	Pos	Driver	Points
2	1	Kyle Busch	4,046
	2	Martin Truex Jr.	4,042 (–4)
2	3	Denny Hamlin	4,037 (–9)
2	4	Joey Logano	4,030 (–16)
1	5	Kevin Harvick	4,028 (–18)
4	6	Chase Elliott	4,024 (–22)
	7	Kyle Larson	4,011 (–35)
1	8	Ryan Blaney	4,009 (–37)
4	9	Brad Keselowski	2,229 (–1,817)
1	10	William Byron	2,181 (–1,865)
3	11	Alex Bowman	2,181 (–1,865)
1	12	Clint Bowyer	2,165 (–1,881)
	13	Aric Almirola	2,148 (–1,898)
1	14	Kurt Busch	2,130 (–1,916)
1	15	Ryan Newman	2,121 (–1,925)
	16	Erik Jones	2,072 (–1,974)
Official driver's standings

Manufacturers' Championship standings

Pos	Manufacturer	Points
1	Toyota	1,167
2	Ford	1,127 (–40)
3	Chevrolet	1,093 (–74)

- Note: Only the first 16 positions are included for the driver standings.

Previous race: 2019 1000Bulbs.com 500	Monster Energy NASCAR Cup Series; 2019 season	Next race: 2019 First Data 500
