= 2019 First Data 500 =

Race details
- Race 33 of 36 in the 2019 Monster Energy NASCAR Cup Series
- Martinsville Speedway
- Date: October 27, 2019
- Location: Martinsville Speedway in Ridgeway, Virginia
- Course: Permanent racing facility
- Course length: .526 miles (.847 km)
- Distance: 500 laps, 263 mi (423.5 km)
- Average speed: 75.448 miles per hour (121.422 km/h)

Pole position
Driver	Denny Hamlin	Joe Gibbs Racing
- Time: 19.354

Most laps led
Driver	Martin Truex Jr.	Joe Gibbs Racing
- Laps: 464

Winner
No. 19	Martin Truex Jr.	Joe Gibbs Racing

Television in the United States
- Network: NBCSN
- Announcers: Rick Allen, Jeff Burton, Steve Letarte and Dale Earnhardt Jr.
- Nielsen ratings: 2.252 million

Radio in the United States
- Radio: MRN
- Booth announcers: Alex Hayden, Jeff Striegle and Rusty Wallace
- Turn announcers: Dave Moody (Backstretch)

The 2019 First Data 500 was a Monster Energy NASCAR Cup Series race held on October 27, 2019, at Martinsville Speedway in Ridgeway, Virginia. Contested over 500 laps on the .526 mile (.847 km) short track, it was the 33rd race of the 2019 Monster Energy NASCAR Cup Series season, seventh race of the Playoffs, and first race of the Round of 8.

== Report ==
=== Background ===
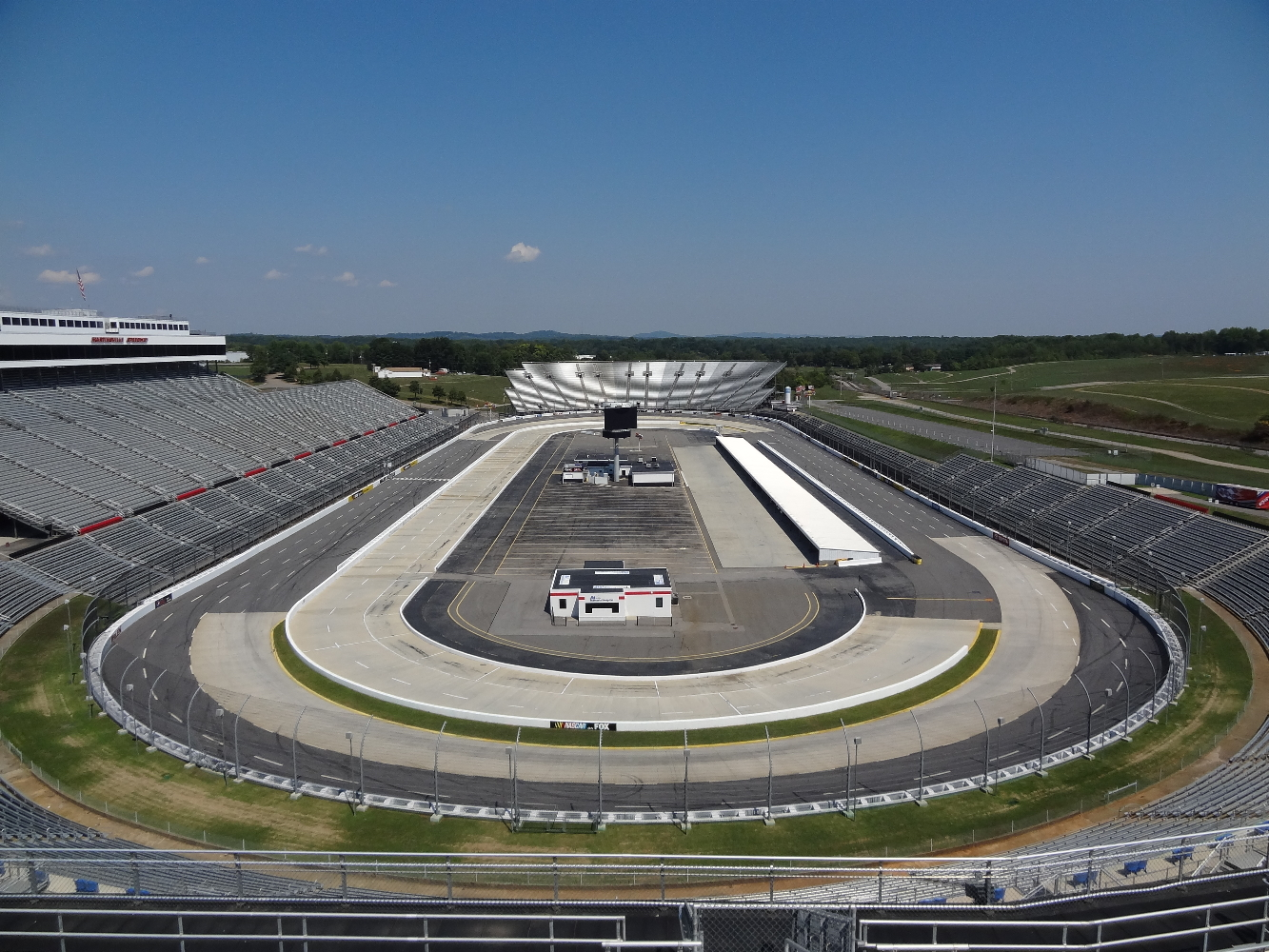
Martinsville Speedway, the track where the race was held.

Martinsville Speedway is an International Speedway Corporation-owned NASCAR stock car racing track located in Henry County, in Ridgeway, Virginia, just to the south of Martinsville. At 0.526 miles (0.847 km) in length, it is the shortest track in the NASCAR Monster Energy Cup Series. The track is also one of the first paved oval tracks in NASCAR, being built in 1947 by H. Clay Earles. It is also the only race track that has been on the NASCAR circuit from its beginning in 1948. Along with this, Martinsville is the only NASCAR oval track on the entire NASCAR track circuit to have asphalt surfaces on the straightaways, then concrete to cover the turns.

==== Entry list ====
- (i) denotes driver who are ineligible for series driver points.
- (R) denotes rookie driver.

No.	Driver	Team	Manufacturer
00	Landon Cassill (i)	StarCom Racing	Chevrolet
1	Kurt Busch	Chip Ganassi Racing	Chevrolet
2	Brad Keselowski	Team Penske	Ford
3	Austin Dillon	Richard Childress Racing	Chevrolet
4	Kevin Harvick	Stewart-Haas Racing	Ford
6	Ryan Newman	Roush Fenway Racing	Ford
8	Daniel Hemric (R)	Richard Childress Racing	Chevrolet
9	Chase Elliott	Hendrick Motorsports	Chevrolet
10	Aric Almirola	Stewart-Haas Racing	Ford
11	Denny Hamlin	Joe Gibbs Racing	Toyota
12	Ryan Blaney	Team Penske	Ford
13	Ty Dillon	Germain Racing	Chevrolet
14	Clint Bowyer	Stewart-Haas Racing	Ford
15	Ross Chastain (i)	Premium Motorsports	Chevrolet
17	Ricky Stenhouse Jr.	Roush Fenway Racing	Ford
18	Kyle Busch	Joe Gibbs Racing	Toyota
19	Martin Truex Jr.	Joe Gibbs Racing	Toyota
20	Erik Jones	Joe Gibbs Racing	Toyota
21	Paul Menard	Wood Brothers Racing	Ford
22	Joey Logano	Team Penske	Ford
24	William Byron	Hendrick Motorsports	Chevrolet
27	Reed Sorenson	Premium Motorsports	Chevrolet
32	Corey LaJoie	Go Fas Racing	Ford
34	Michael McDowell	Front Row Motorsports	Ford
36	Matt Crafton (i)	Front Row Motorsports	Ford
37	Chris Buescher	JTG Daugherty Racing	Chevrolet
38	David Ragan	Front Row Motorsports	Ford
41	Daniel Suárez	Stewart-Haas Racing	Ford
42	Kyle Larson	Chip Ganassi Racing	Chevrolet
43	Bubba Wallace	Richard Petty Motorsports	Chevrolet
47	Ryan Preece (R)	JTG Daugherty Racing	Chevrolet
48	Jimmie Johnson	Hendrick Motorsports	Chevrolet
51	B. J. McLeod (i)	Petty Ware Racing	Chevrolet
52	Garrett Smithley (i)	Rick Ware Racing	Chevrolet
53	J. J. Yeley (i)	Rick Ware Racing	Chevrolet
77	Timmy Hill (i)	Spire Motorsports	Chevrolet
88	Alex Bowman	Hendrick Motorsports	Chevrolet
95	Matt DiBenedetto	Leavine Family Racing	Toyota
Official entry list

- Matt Tifft was supposed to drive No. 36 car but he was hospitalized after suffering “a medical condition”. Matt Crafton was called to replace Tifft in the No. 36 car. Tifft has not raced in NASCAR since the hospitalization.

== Practice ==
=== First practice ===
Joey Logano was the fastest in the first practice session with a time of 19.591 seconds and a speed of 96.657 mph (155.554 km/h).

Pos	No.	Driver	Team	Manufacturer	Time	Speed
1	22	Joey Logano	Team Penske	Ford	19.591	96.657
2	19	Martin Truex Jr.	Joe Gibbs Racing	Toyota	19.689	96.176
3	11	Denny Hamlin	Joe Gibbs Racing	Toyota	19.732	95.966
Official first practice results

=== Final practice ===
Brad Keselowski was the fastest in the final practice session with a time of 19.667 seconds and a speed of 96.283 mph (154.952 km/h).

Pos	No.	Driver	Team	Manufacturer	Time	Speed
1	2	Brad Keselowski	Team Penske	Ford	19.667	96.283
2	12	Ryan Blaney	Team Penske	Ford	19.774	95.762
3	1	Kurt Busch	Chip Ganassi Racing	Chevrolet	19.786	95.704
Official final practice results

== Qualifying ==
Denny Hamlin scored the pole for the race with a time of 19.354 and a speed of 97.840 mph (157.458 km/h).

=== Qualifying results ===
Pos	No.	Driver	Team	Manufacturer	Time
1	11	Denny Hamlin	Joe Gibbs Racing	Toyota	19.354
2	9	Chase Elliott	Hendrick Motorsports	Chevrolet	19.383
3	19	Martin Truex Jr.	Joe Gibbs Racing	Toyota	19.429
4	10	Aric Almirola	Stewart-Haas Racing	Ford	19.453
5	34	Michael McDowell	Front Row Motorsports	Ford	19.471
6	12	Ryan Blaney	Team Penske	Ford	19.487
7	14	Clint Bowyer	Stewart-Haas Racing	Ford	19.488
8	20	Erik Jones	Joe Gibbs Racing	Toyota	19.492
9	41	Daniel Suárez	Stewart-Haas Racing	Ford	19.506
10	22	Joey Logano	Team Penske	Ford	19.509
11	24	William Byron	Hendrick Motorsports	Chevrolet	19.525
12	95	Matt DiBenedetto	Leavine Family Racing	Toyota	19.545
13	18	Kyle Busch	Joe Gibbs Racing	Toyota	19.547
14	42	Kyle Larson	Chip Ganassi Racing	Chevrolet	19.547
15	2	Brad Keselowski	Team Penske	Ford	19.579
16	17	Ricky Stenhouse Jr.	Roush Fenway Racing	Ford	19.593
17	38	David Ragan	Front Row Motorsports	Ford	19.619
18	8	Daniel Hemric (R)	Richard Childress Racing	Chevrolet	19.641
19	88	Alex Bowman	Hendrick Motorsports	Chevrolet	19.650
20	37	Chris Buescher	JTG Daugherty Racing	Chevrolet	19.669
21	47	Ryan Preece (R)	JTG Daugherty Racing	Chevrolet	19.686
22	4	Kevin Harvick	Stewart-Haas Racing	Ford	19.688
23	3	Austin Dillon	Richard Childress Racing	Chevrolet	19.732
24	48	Jimmie Johnson	Hendrick Motorsports	Chevrolet	19.742
25	1	Kurt Busch	Chip Ganassi Racing	Chevrolet	19.745
26	43	Bubba Wallace	Richard Petty Motorsports	Chevrolet	19.756
27	6	Ryan Newman	Roush Fenway Racing	Ford	19.762
28	32	Corey LaJoie	Go Fas Racing	Ford	19.796
29	13	Ty Dillon	Germain Racing	Chevrolet	19.821
30	21	Paul Menard	Wood Brothers Racing	Ford	19.900
31	36	Matt Crafton (i)	Front Row Motorsports	Ford	20.031
32	00	Landon Cassill	StarCom Racing	Chevrolet	20.070
33	51	B. J. McLeod (i)	Petty Ware Racing	Chevrolet	20.141
34	27	Reed Sorenson	Premium Motorsports	Chevrolet	20.150
35	53	J. J. Yeley (i)	Rick Ware Racing	Chevrolet	20.292
36	15	Ross Chastain (i)	Premium Motorsports	Chevrolet	20.401
37	77	Timmy Hill (i)	Spire Motorsports	Chevrolet	20.449
38	52	Garrett Smithley (i)	Rick Ware Racing	Chevrolet	20.477
Official qualifying results

== Race ==
=== Stage results ===
Stage One Laps: 130

Pos	No	Driver	Team	Manufacturer	Points
1	19	Martin Truex Jr.	Joe Gibbs Racing	Toyota	10
2	11	Denny Hamlin	Joe Gibbs Racing	Toyota	9
3	12	Ryan Blaney	Team Penske	Ford	8
4	14	Clint Bowyer	Stewart-Haas Racing	Ford	7
5	22	Joey Logano	Team Penske	Ford	6
6	24	William Byron	Hendrick Motorsports	Chevrolet	5
7	10	Aric Almirola	Stewart-Haas Racing	Ford	4
8	9	Chase Elliott	Hendrick Motorsports	Chevrolet	3
9	18	Kyle Busch	Joe Gibbs Racing	Toyota	2
10	41	Daniel Suárez	Stewart-Haas Racing	Ford	1
Official stage one results

Stage Two Laps: 130

Pos	No	Driver	Team	Manufacturer	Points
1	19	Martin Truex Jr.	Joe Gibbs Racing	Toyota	10
2	42	Kyle Larson	Chip Ganassi Racing	Chevrolet	9
3	12	Ryan Blaney	Team Penske	Ford	8
4	22	Joey Logano	Team Penske	Ford	7
5	10	Aric Almirola	Stewart-Haas Racing	Ford	6
6	24	William Byron	Hendrick Motorsports	Chevrolet	5
7	18	Kyle Busch	Joe Gibbs Racing	Toyota	4
8	11	Denny Hamlin	Joe Gibbs Racing	Toyota	3
9	20	Erik Jones	Joe Gibbs Racing	Toyota	2
10	2	Brad Keselowski	Team Penske	Ford	1
Official stage two results

=== Final stage results ===
Stage Three Laps: 240

Pos	Grid	No	Driver	Team	Manufacturer	Laps	Points
1	3	19	Martin Truex Jr.	Joe Gibbs Racing	Toyota	500	60
2	11	24	William Byron	Hendrick Motorsports	Chevrolet	500	45
3	15	2	Brad Keselowski	Team Penske	Ford	500	35
4	1	11	Denny Hamlin	Joe Gibbs Racing	Toyota	500	45
5	6	12	Ryan Blaney	Team Penske	Ford	500	48
6	25	1	Kurt Busch	Chip Ganassi Racing	Chevrolet	500	31
7	22	4	Kevin Harvick	Stewart-Haas Racing	Ford	500	30
8	10	22	Joey Logano	Team Penske	Ford	500	42
9	14	42	Kyle Larson	Chip Ganassi Racing	Chevrolet	500	37
10	35	6	Ryan Newman	Roush Fenway Racing	Ford	500	27
11	17	38	David Ragan	Front Row Motorsports	Ford	500	26
12	20	37	Chris Buescher	JTG Daugherty Racing	Chevrolet	500	25
13	26	43	Bubba Wallace	Richard Petty Motorsports	Chevrolet	500	24
14	13	18	Kyle Busch	Joe Gibbs Racing	Toyota	500	29
15	16	17	Ricky Stenhouse Jr.	Roush Fenway Racing	Ford	500	22
16	12	95	Matt DiBenedetto	Leavine Family Racing	Toyota	500	21
17	18	8	Daniel Hemric (R)	Richard Childress Racing	Chevrolet	500	20
18	36	32	Corey LaJoie	Go Fas Racing	Ford	500	19
19	21	47	Ryan Preece (R)	JTG Daugherty Racing	Chevrolet	500	18
20	8	20	Erik Jones	Joe Gibbs Racing	Toyota	499	19
21	28	21	Paul Menard	Wood Brothers Racing	Ford	499	16
22	23	3	Austin Dillon	Richard Childress Racing	Chevrolet	499	15
23	5	34	Michael McDowell	Front Row Motorsports	Ford	499	14
24	27	13	Ty Dillon	Germain Racing	Chevrolet	498	13
25	29	36	Matt Crafton (i)	Front Row Motorsports	Ford	495	0
26	30	00	Landon Cassill (i)	StarCom Racing	Chevrolet	495	0
27	38	51	B. J. McLeod (i)	Petty Ware Racing	Chevrolet	494	0
28	32	53	J. J. Yeley (i)	Rick Ware Racing	Chevrolet	494	0
29	33	15	Ross Chastain (i)	Premium Motorsports	Chevrolet	494	0
30	19	88	Alex Bowman	Hendrick Motorsports	Chevrolet	494	7
31	9	41	Daniel Suárez	Stewart-Haas Racing	Ford	488	7
32	34	52	Garrett Smithley (i)	Rick Ware Racing	Chevrolet	487	0
33	31	27	Reed Sorenson	Premium Motorsports	Chevrolet	452	4
34	37	77	Timmy Hill (i)	Spire Motorsports	Chevrolet	450	0
35	7	14	Clint Bowyer	Stewart-Haas Racing	Ford	449	9
36	2	9	Chase Elliott	Hendrick Motorsports	Chevrolet	445	4
37	4	10	Aric Almirola	Stewart-Haas Racing	Ford	363	11
38	24	48	Jimmie Johnson	Hendrick Motorsports	Chevrolet	361	1
Official race results

=== Race statistics ===
- Lead changes: 3 among 3 different drivers
- Cautions/Laps: 11 for 69
- Red flags: 0
- Time of race: 3 hours, 29 minutes and 9 seconds
- Average speed: 75.448 miles per hour (121.422 km/h)

== Media ==
=== Television ===
NBC Sports covered the race on the television side. Rick Allen, 1997 race winner Jeff Burton, Steve Letarte and 2014 race winner Dale Earnhardt Jr. had the call in the booth for the race. Parker Kligerman, Marty Snider and Kelli Stavast reported from pit lane during the race.

NBCSN
Booth announcers	Pit reporters
Lap-by-lap: Rick Allen; Color-commentator: Jeff Burton; Color-commentator: Steve Letarte; Color-commentator: Dale Earnhardt Jr.	Parker Kligerman; Marty Snider; Kelli Stavast

=== Radio ===
MRN covered the radio call for the race, which was simulcast on Sirius XM NASCAR Radio. Alex Hayden, Jeff Striegle, and 7 time Martinsville winner Rusty Wallace had the call for MRN when the field raced down the front straightaway. Dave Moody covered the action for MRN when the field raced down the backstraightway into turn 3. Winston Kelley, Steve Post, Kim Coon, and Dillon Welch had the call for MRN from pit lane.

MRN
Booth announcers	Turn announcers	Pit reporters
Lead announcer: Alex Hayden; Announcer: Jeff Striegle; Announcer: Rusty Wallace	Backstretch: Dave Moody	Winston Kelley; Steve Post; Kim Coon; Dillon Welch

== Standings after the race ==
	Pos	Driver	Points
1	1	Martin Truex Jr.	4,102
1	2	Denny Hamlin	4,082 (–20)
2	3	Kyle Busch	4,075 (–27)
	4	Joey Logano	4,072 (–30)
	5	Kevin Harvick	4,058 (–44)
2	6	Ryan Blaney	4,057 (–45)
	7	Kyle Larson	4,048 (–54)
2	8	Chase Elliott	4,028 (–74)
	9	Brad Keselowski	2,264 (–1,838)
	10	William Byron	2,226 (–1,876)
1	11	Clint Bowyer	2,190 (–1,912)
1	12	Alex Bowman	2,172 (–1,930)
1	13	Kurt Busch	2,161 (–1,941)
1	14	Aric Almirola	2,159 (–1,943)
	15	Ryan Newman	2,148 (–1,954)
	16	Erik Jones	2,091 (–2,011)
Official driver's standings

Manufacturers' Championship standings

Pos	Manufacturer	Points
1	Toyota	1,207
2	Ford	1,161 (–46)
3	Chevrolet	1,128 (–79)

- Note: Only the first 16 positions are included for the driver standings.

Previous race: 2019 Hollywood Casino 400	Monster Energy NASCAR Cup Series; 2019 season	Next race: 2019 AAA Texas 500
