= Matt Tifft =

American racing driver (born 1996)

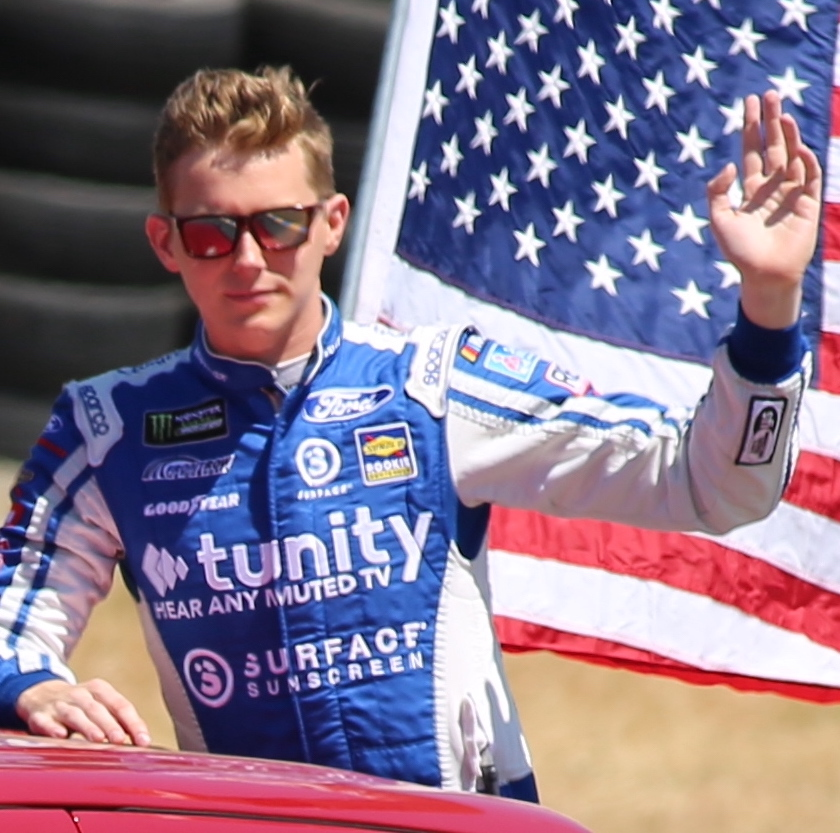
- Tifft at Sonoma Raceway in 2019
- Born: Matthew Kenneth Tifft; June 26, 1996 (age 30); Fairfax, Virginia, U.S.
- Height: 6 ft 1 in (1.85 m)
- Weight: 165 lb (75 kg)
- Awards: 2012 ARCA Midwest Tour Rookie of the Year

NASCAR Cup Series career
- 32 races run over 1 year
- 2019 position: 31st
- Best finish: 31st (2019)
- First race: 2019 Daytona 500 (Daytona)
- Last race: 2019 Hollywood Casino 400 (Kansas)
Wins	Top tens	Poles
0	1	0

NASCAR O'Reilly Auto Parts Series career
- 77 races run over 4 years
- 2018 position: 6th
- Best finish: 6th (2018)
- First race: 2015 VisitMyrtleBeach.com 300 (Kentucky)
- Last race: 2018 Ford EcoBoost 300 (Homestead)
Wins	Top tens	Poles
0	38	2

NASCAR FedEx Freight Truck Series career
- 25 races run over 3 years
- 2016 position: 21st
- Best finish: 21st (2015, 2016)
- First race: 2014 Kroger 200 (Martinsville)
- Last race: 2016 Ford EcoBoost 200 (Homestead)
Wins	Top tens	Poles
0	9	0
- Statistics up to date as of August 19, 2023.

Matthew Kenneth Tifft (born June 26, 1996) is an American professional stock car racing driver and former team owner. He currently competes part-time in the Super Late Models, driving the No. 36 Chevrolet SS for Dan Fredrickson Racing. In 2020, with his racing career in question due to a past brain tumor and a diagnosis of epilepsy, he became part owner of Live Fast Motorsports with B. J. McLeod & Joe Falk, becoming the youngest team owner in NASCAR Cup Series history. Tifft also was named to the 2022 Forbes 30 under 30 Class. Medical issues sidelined Tifft as a driver from the end of 2019 until the end of 2023 season.

== Racing career ==
=== Early career (2007–2010) ===
In the fall of 2007, Tifft had his first opportunity to race in a go-kart at Barberton Speedway in Norton, Ohio. He was coached by Kevin Harter of CRP Racing. In 2009, he made his first divisional and national level go kart schedule, under Beasley Motorsports, being coached by Gary Lawson. During this season, Tifft would win two national-level victories. In 2010, Tifft transitioned from karts to asphalt and dirt super late models, with the help of Josh Richards, Dale McDowell, Clint Smith, Benny Gordon, and Tim Schendel.

=== Stock car racing (2011–2023) ===
2011 marked Tifft's first full year in stock cars, as he compiled two super late model victories and had multiple top-five finishes. Along with the work with Schendel and Gordon, Tifft also raced a significant number of races with BJ McLeod Motorsports. In 2012, Tifft won the Rookie of the Year title in the ARCA Midwest Tour. In addition, Tifft finished the season with fifth in points overall.

In 2013, Tifft joined the Win-Tron Racing team to race in the NASCAR K&N Pro Series East, as well as select ARCA Series races.

In 2014, Tifft signed with Ken Schrader Racing to run select ARCA and K&N East races. Tifft also made his NASCAR Camping World Truck Series debut at Martinsville Speedway, finishing eighth.

On November 14, 2014, it was announced that Tifft would be running a six-race schedule with Kyle Busch Motorsports for the 2015 NASCAR Camping World Truck Series.

Tifft made his Xfinity Series debut in 2015 with Joe Gibbs Racing, finishing 10th. The following year, Tifft was then signed by JGR to drive the No. 18 in thirteen races. Tifft drove 3 races with JGL Racing driving the No. 24 in the Xfinity Series, before driving for JGR. Tifft also joined Red Horse Racing to drive the No. 11 in the Truck Series.

Tifft sustained a disc condition in his back in 2016, and on recommendation of his doctor, sat out the American Ethanol E15 250. Sam Hornish Jr. subbed for him and ended up winning the race. Tifft eventually underwent surgery for a low-grade glioma in his brain. On September 12, 2016, NASCAR officials cleared Tifft to return to racing.

On November 4, 2016, it was announced that Tifft would drive full-time in JGR's No. 19 entry in 2017, competing for the Rookie of the Year.

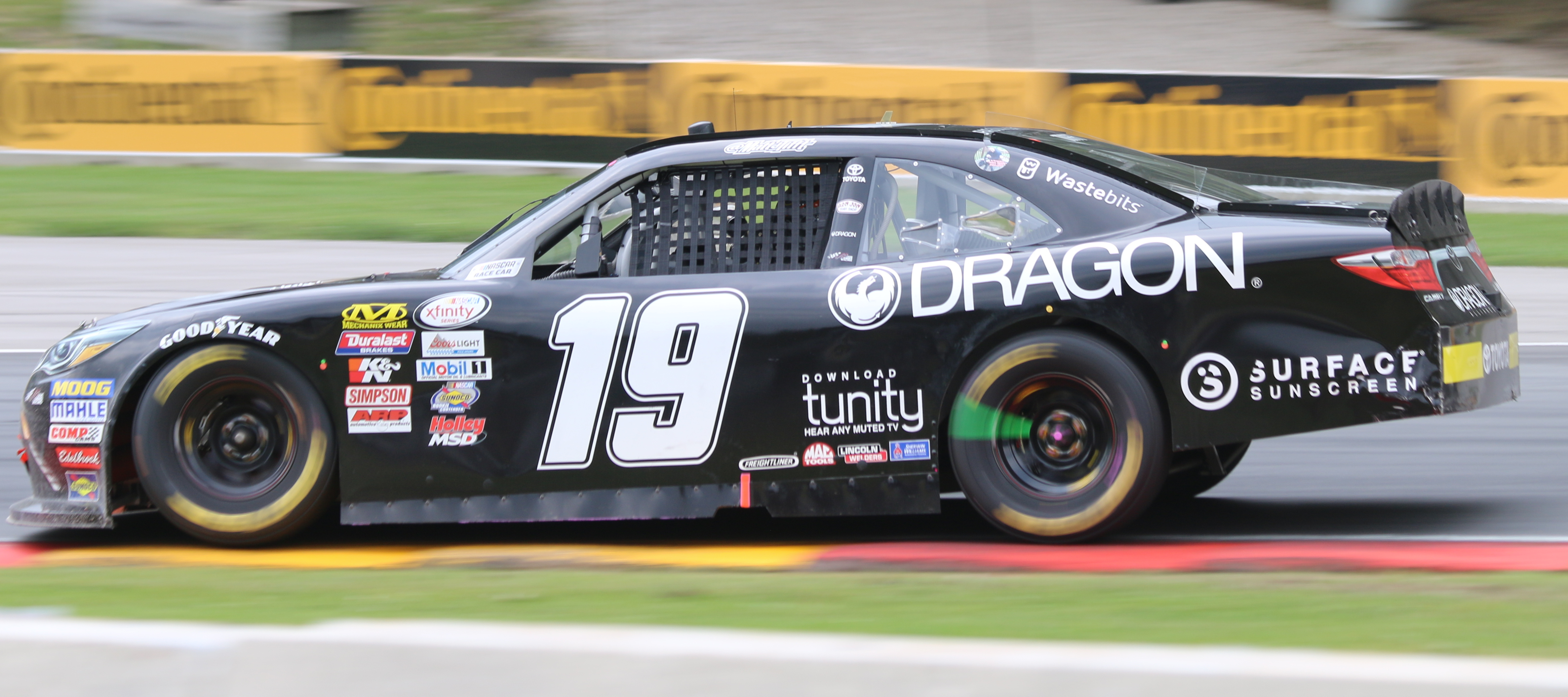
Tifft's No. 19 Xfinity Series car at Road America in 2017

Tifft had not scored a top five in 2017, but at Mid-Ohio Sports Car Course on August 12, 2017, he finished a career best third place. On August 27, 2017, Tifft came within two laps of his first Xfinity Series victory at the season's annual trip to Road America. Tifft was leading on the penultimate lap when a fast-closing Jeremy Clements hooked Tifft in Turn 14, spinning both cars out within sight of the finish line. Tifft would ultimately finish third behind Clements and Michael Annett, tying his Mid-Ohio finish.

On October 5, 2017, it was announced that Tifft had signed a multi-year deal to drive the No. 2 Chevrolet Camaro for Richard Childress Racing starting in 2018.

On November 27, 2018, it was announced that Tifft would drive the Front Row Motorsports No. 36 Ford Mustang GT in the Monster Energy NASCAR Cup Series and compete for 2019 Rookie of the Year honors. Tifft selected 36 as his racing number to honor his mentor Ken Schrader, who raced with that number in the Winston Cup Series from 2000 to 2002. Prior to the Martinsville race, Tifft was rushed to the hospital after suffering a seizure and blacking out in the team hauler, forcing Matt Crafton to take over the No. 36 for the race. As a result of the seizure, he missed the rest of the 2019 season as John Hunter Nemechek substituted in the No. 36 for the final three races. On November 13, 2019, he and FRM parted ways as Tifft intended to focus on his health and could not commit to a full-time 2020 schedule.

On October 23, 2020, Tifft and B. J. McLeod purchased Archie St. Hilare's half of Go Fas Racing's charter. Tifft, McLeod, and Joe Falk used the charter full-time in 2021 while Go Fas Racing scaled down to a part-time schedule. When the team was formed as Live Fast Motorsports, Tifft would later say in an interview that part of the reason he decided to move to team ownership was because of the uncertainty over continuing his racing career due to his health issues, and his desire to continue his involvement in the sport. He also confirmed in the interview that doctors advised him to retire after 2019, because of his health issues. Tifft was the youngest Cup Series team owner in 2021 at age 24. Because of this achievement, he was named to the Forbes 30 Under 30 for 2022. Tifft stepped away as owner of Live Fast prior to the 2024 season, after the team sold its charter and scaled back to a part-time operation.

=== Return to racing (2023–present) ===
After working with doctors at Georgetown University and participating in a test session at Hickory Motor Speedway, Tifft returned to racing in August 2023, competing in Super Late Models for Dan Fredricksonn Racing at Marshfield Speedway and Golden Sands Speedway. Tifft earned a top-five finish in his first race at Marshfield, and in two races at Golden Sands he earned a pole, and fourth and seventh place finishes.

Tifft announced that he would compete in 30 events in 2024, split between dirt late models and the SCCA Trans-Am TA2 series.

In a video posted on X, Tifft revealed he has had discussions with NASCAR regarding a comeback, and that the sanctioning body has stated that he wouldn't be cleared until "2031."

== Business ventures ==
=== Mansfield Motor Speedway ===
On June 1, 2025, Tifft announced he had purchased Mansfield Motor Speedway, with the intentions of restoring the facility. Tifft had previously shown interest in reviving the track.

== Personal life ==
Tifft was born in Fairfax County, Virginia, and grew up with brother Morgan and sister Maggie in Hinckley, Ohio. He graduated from Highland High School in nearby Granger, Ohio. He currently attends school at UNC Charlotte, majoring in Business Management. He is a fan of the Cleveland Guardians, Cleveland Browns, and Cleveland Cavaliers. Tifft has attended several Indians games and threw the first pitch at a Guardians game in 2018. Tifft also ran an Indians Fanatics car at his home track at Mid-Ohio.

On July 1, 2016, Tifft underwent surgery to remove a low-grade benign brain tumor. The tumor was discovered during treatment of a back injury.

Tifft became engaged in the offseason following the 2018 season. Tifft married Jordan Holt in December 2019. In a 2024 interview, Tifft revealed the couple welcomed a son earlier that year.

== Motorsports career results ==
=== NASCAR ===
(key) (Bold – Pole position awarded by qualifying time. Italics – Pole position earned by points standings or practice time. * – Most laps led.)

==== Monster Energy Cup Series ====
Monster Energy NASCAR Cup Series results
Year	Team	No.	Make	1	2	3	4	5	6	7	8	9	10	11	12	13	14	15	16	17	18	19	20	21	22	23	24	25	26	27	28	29	30	31	32	33	34	35	36	MENCC	Pts	Ref
2019	Front Row Motorsports	36	Ford	DAY; 36	ATL; 28	LVS; 34	PHO; 20	CAL; 26	MAR; 29	TEX; 24	BRI; 27	RCH; 29	TAL; 37	DOV; 32	KAN; 21	CLT; 20	POC; 33	MCH; 24	SON; 28	CHI; 29	DAY; 9	KEN; 27	NHA; 24	POC; 23	GLN; 24	MCH; 25	BRI; 27	DAR; 27	IND; 32	LVS; 30	RCH; 20	CLT; 25	DOV; 25	TAL; 13	KAN; 25	MAR	TEX	PHO	HOM	31st	352	

===== Daytona 500 =====
Year	Team	Manufacturer	Start	Finish
2019	Front Row Motorsports	Ford	33	36

==== Xfinity Series ====
NASCAR Xfinity Series results
Year	Team	No.	Make	1	2	3	4	5	6	7	8	9	10	11	12	13	14	15	16	17	18	19	20	21	22	23	24	25	26	27	28	29	30	31	32	33	NXSC	Pts	Ref
2015	Joe Gibbs Racing	20	Toyota	DAY	ATL	LVS	PHO	CAL	TEX	BRI	RCH	TAL	IOW	CLT	DOV	MCH	CHI	DAY	KEN	NHA	IND	IOW	GLN	MOH	BRI	ROA	DAR	RCH	CHI	KEN; 10	DOV	CLT	KAN	TEX	PHO	HOM	95th	0^{1}	
2016	JGL Racing	24	Toyota	DAY; 21	ATL	LVS	PHO	CAL	TEX; 20	BRI; 23																											101st	0^{1}	
2016	Joe Gibbs Racing	18	Toyota								RCH; 33	**TAL**; 8	DOV; 8	CLT	POC	MCH	IOW	DAY	KEN	NHA	IND	IOW	GLN	MOH	BRI	ROA	DAR	RCH	CHI	KEN; 5	DOV	CLT; 8	KAN	TEX; 9	PHO	HOM; 25	101st	0^{1}	
2017	Joe Gibbs Racing	19	Toyota	DAY; 11	ATL; 12	LVS; 34	PHO; 12	CAL; 17	TEX; 9	BRI; 16	RCH; 14	TAL; 6	CLT; 26	DOV; 9	POC; 10	MCH; 26	IOW; 22	DAY; 18	KEN; 14	NHA; 11	IND; 11	IOW; 19	GLN; 13	MOH; 3	BRI; 17	ROA; 3	DAR; 40	RCH; 13	CHI; 6	KEN; 9	DOV; 6	CLT; 9	KAN; 8	TEX; 8	PHO; 11	HOM; 7	7th	2211	
2018	Richard Childress Racing	2	Chevy	DAY; 19	ATL; 12	LVS; 11	PHO; 7	CAL; 8	TEX; 6	BRI; 35	RCH; 4	TAL; 25	DOV; 8	CLT; 9	POC; 14	MCH; 16	IOW; 9	CHI; 16	DAY; 20	KEN; 11	NHA; 5	IOW; 26	GLN; 37	MOH; 4	BRI; 10	**ROA**; 2	DAR; 8	IND; 6	LVS; 36	RCH; 5	CLT; 6	DOV; 15	KAN; 6	TEX; 7	PHO; 3	HOM; 10	6th	2254	

==== Camping World Truck Series ====
NASCAR Camping World Truck Series results
Year	Team	No.	Make	1	2	3	4	5	6	7	8	9	10	11	12	13	14	15	16	17	18	19	20	21	22	23	NCWTC	Pts	Ref
2014	B. J. McLeod Motorsports	0	Chevy	DAY	MAR	KAN	CLT	DOV	TEX	GTW	KEN	IOW	ELD	POC	MCH	BRI	MSP	CHI	NHA	LVS	TAL	MAR; 8	TEX				43rd	83	
2014	B. J. McLeod Motorsports	45	Chevy																					PHO; 20	HOM; 21		43rd	83	
2015	Venturini Motorsports	25	Toyota	DAY; 19	ATL	MAR; 9	KAN; 29																				21st	327	
2015	Kyle Busch Motorsports	51	Toyota					CLT; 8	DOV	TEX	GTW; 25	IOW	KEN	ELD; 21				MSP; 23			LVS; 19	TAL; 23	MAR	TEX			21st	327	
2015	Kyle Busch Motorsports	54	Toyota												POC; 8	MCH	BRI		CHI; 9	NHA					PHO; 8	HOM	21st	327	
2016	Red Horse Racing	11	Toyota	DAY	ATL	MAR	KAN; 14	DOV; 12	CLT; 5	TEX	IOW	GTW	KEN	ELD	POC	BRI	MCH	MSP	CHI; 12	NHA	LVS; 15	TAL; 9	MAR; 16	TEX; 17	PHO; 8	HOM; 12	21st	211	

==== K&N Pro Series East ====
NASCAR K&N Pro Series East results
Year	Team	No.	Make	1	2	3	4	5	6	7	8	9	10	11	12	13	14	15	16	NKNPSEC	Pts	Ref
2013	Win-Tron Racing	89	Chevy	BRI; DNQ	GRE; 26	FIF; 16	RCH; 10	BGS; 17	IOW; 7	LGY; 6	COL; 16	IOW; 24	VIR; 15	GRE; 12	NHA; 13	DOV; 16	RAL; 23			16th	378	
2014	Ken Schrader Racing	52	Dodge	NSM; 12	DAY	BRI; 9	GRE	RCH; 13	IOW	BGS	FIF	LGY	NHA; 12	COL	IOW	GLN			DOV; 19	24th	193	
2014	B. J. McLeod Motorsports	89	Chevy														VIR; 6	GRE		24th	193	
2017	Jefferson Pitts Racing	27	Toyota	NSM	GRE	BRI	SBO	SBO	MEM	BLN	TMP	NHA	IOW	GLN; 10	LGY	NJM	DOV			50th	34	

==== K&N Pro Series West ====
NASCAR K&N Pro Series West results
Year	Team	No.	Make	1	2	3	4	5	6	7	8	9	10	11	12	13	14	15	NKNPSWC	Pts	Ref
2013	TEI Motorsports	89	Chevy	PHO	S99	BIR	IOW	L44	SON	CNS	IOW	EVG; 9	SPO	MMP; 5	SMP	AAS	KCR; 9	PHO; 11	21st	130	
2014	TEI Motorsports	41	Chevy	PHO	IRW	S99	IOW	KCR	SON; 10	SLS	CNS	IOW	EVG	KCR	MMP	AAS	PHO		61st	34	
2015	Jefferson Pitts Racing	55	Toyota	KCR	IRW	TUS	IOW	SHA	SON; 15	SLS	IOW	EVG	CNS	MER	AAS	PHO			55th	29	

^{*} Season still in progress
^{1} Ineligible for series points

=== ARCA Racing Series ===
(key) (Bold – Pole position awarded by qualifying time. Italics – Pole position earned by points standings or practice time. * – Most laps led.)

ARCA Racing Series results
Year	Team	No.	Make	1	2	3	4	5	6	7	8	9	10	11	12	13	14	15	16	17	18	19	20	21	ARSC	Pts	Ref
2013	Win-Tron Racing	89	Chevy	DAY	MOB	SLM	TAL	TOL; 5	ELK	POC	MCH	ROA	WIN	CHI	NJE; 15	POC	BLN	ISF	MAD	DSF	IOW	SLM	KEN	KAN	70th	360	
2014	Ken Schrader Racing	52	Chevy	DAY	MOB; 6	SLM	TAL		NJE; 3	POC; 19	MCH	ELK	WIN	CHI; 3		POC; 22	BLN	ISF	MAD; 9	DSF	SLM	KEN; 2	KAN; 28		17th	1820	
2014	Ken Schrader Racing	10	Chevy					TOL; 3																	17th	1820	
2014	Ken Schrader Racing	11	Chevy												IRP; 5										17th	1820	
2015	Ken Schrader Racing	52	Chevy	DAY	MOB; 6					NJE; 14*			CHI; 4	WIN	IOW; 5	IRP	POC; 23	BLN							20th	1550	
2015	Ken Schrader Racing	52	Toyota			NSH; 2	SLM	TAL	TOL		POC; 10	MCH											KAN; 15		20th	1550	
2015	Venturini Motorsports	55	Toyota																ISF; 28	DSF	SLM	KEN			20th	1550	
2016	Venturini Motorsports	15	Toyota	DAY	NSH	SLM	TAL	TOL	NJE	POC	MCH; 5	MAD	WIN	IOW	IRP	POC	BLN	ISF	DSF	SLM	CHI				55th	425	
2016	Ranier Racing with MDM	28	Chevy																			KEN; 3	KAN		55th	425	
2017	Joe Gibbs Racing	18	Toyota	DAY; 12	NSH	SLM	TAL	TOL	ELK	POC	MCH	MAD	IOW	IRP	POC	WIN	ISF								57th	335	
2017	MDM Motorsports	28	Toyota															ROA; 15	DSF	SLM	CHI	KEN	KAN		57th	335	

=== ASA STARS National Tour ===
(key) (Bold – Pole position awarded by qualifying time. Italics – Pole position earned by points standings or practice time. * – Most laps led. ** – All laps led.)

ASA STARS National Tour results
Year	Team	No.	Make	1	2	3	4	5	6	7	8	9	10	ASNTC	Pts	Ref
2024	Anthony Campi Racing	57	Chevy	NSM	FIF	HCY	MAD	MLW	AND	OWO	TOL; 20	WIN	NSV	81st	32	
