= Front Row Motorsports =

NASCAR team

- Owners: Bob Jenkins; Brad Jenkins
- Base: Mooresville, North Carolina
- Series: NASCAR Cup Series; NASCAR Craftsman Truck Series
- Race drivers: Cup Series; 4. Noah Gragson; 34. Todd Gilliland; 38. Zane Smith; Truck Series; 34. Layne Riggs; 38. Jake Garcia
- Manufacturer: Ford
- Opened: 2004
- Website: teamfrm.com

Career
- Debut: NASCAR Cup Series: 2005 Food City 500 (Bristol); Nationwide Series: 2008 Camping World 300 (Daytona); Craftsman Truck Series; 2020 NextEra Energy 250 (Daytona)
- Latest race: NASCAR Cup Series: 2026 Season Finale 400 (Homestead); Nationwide Series: 2010 Food City 250 (Bristol); Craftsman Truck Series; 2026 Craftsman 200 (Homestead)
- Races competed: Total: 912; NASCAR Cup Series: 673; Nationwide Series: 75; Truck Series: 164
- Drivers' Championships: Total: 1 NASCAR Cup Series: 0 Nationwide Series: 0 Truck Series: 1; 2022
- Race victories: Total: 29; NASCAR Cup Series: 4 Nationwide Series: 0 Truck Series: 25
- Pole positions: Total: 21; NASCAR Cup Series: 8 Nationwide Series: 0 Truck Series: 13

Front Row Motorsports (FRM) is an American professional stock car racing team that currently competes in the NASCAR Cup Series and NASCAR Craftsman Truck Series. The team began running part-time in 2004 as Means-Jenkins Motorsports under a partnership with Jimmy Means and restaurant entrepreneur Bob Jenkins, with Jenkins becoming the full team owner in 2005. In the Cup Series, FRM fields three Ford Mustang Dark Horse teams full-time; the No. 4 for Noah Gragson, the No. 34 for Todd Gilliland, and the No. 38 for Zane Smith. In the Truck Series, they field two Ford F-Series teams full-time; the No. 34 for Layne Riggs and No. 38 for Jake Garcia.

== History ==
Front Row Motorsports has become known as one of the more prominent small-budget teams in the Cup Series, operating with around 60 employees on a fraction of the budget of larger teams, and with equipment often coming second-hand from other Ford teams the team has a technical alliance with such as RFK Racing (from 2016 to 2023) and Team Penske (from 2024 onward). The team has struggled on most intermediate tracks, however since 2011, the team has become noted for its performance at superspeedways and to a lesser extent short tracks, which rely less on aerodynamic performance. This reputation has grown since the signing of noted restrictor-plate racer David Ragan in 2012, who won the team's first race at Talladega the following year with the help of another skilled plate racer and teammate David Gilliland. FRM has also won with Chris Buescher at the rain-shortened 2016 Pennsylvania 400 at Pocono Raceway and Michael McDowell at the 2021 Daytona 500. McDowell dominated and won the 2023 Verizon 200 at the Brickyard in a breakthrough moment for the team, the first time Front Row led the most laps in a race.

The team has received equipment from RFK Racing since 2010 and began a technical alliance with Roush in 2016. The team also began receiving technical support from Ford starting in 2016, after receiving limited data from Ford since 2010. In 2024, FRM switched its technical alliance from RFK Racing to Team Penske.

The team was awarded the assets of BK Racing on August 21, 2018, after former owner Ron Devine and a trustee from Union First Bank put the team up for bidding. After purchasing the assets, they ran a No. 23 car for the rest of the season, driven primarily by J. J. Yeley from NY Racing. After the 2018 season ended, this team became the No. 36 team in 2019.

=== Antitrust lawsuit with 23XI Racing against NASCAR ===
On October 2, 2024, it was announced that Front Row Motorsports, along with 23XI Racing, filed an antitrust lawsuit against NASCAR over the terms of the updated charter agreement, as well as anti-competitive practices committed by the France family. On December 18, both teams were granted a motion of preliminary injunction, allowing them to race as chartered entries in 2025 while continuing their legal battle with NASCAR. The injunction also allowed the transfer of the two Stewart–Haas Racing charters to both teams. On December 31, FRM announced it finalized the purchase of their third charter from SHR. On June 5, 2025, the U.S. Court of Appeals overturned the preliminary injunction ruling. On August 25, NASCAR filed a legal notice of its agreement to issue one of the charters to a redacted entity. On December 11, 2025, after eight days in court, the case was settled.

== Bob Jenkins ==
Robert "Bob" Jenkins, the full owner of the team since 2005, resides in Dandridge, Tennessee, and is known for his involvement within the Yum! Brands family of restaurants. He is not to be confused with the motorsports announcer of the same name. Jenkins currently owns more than 250 franchises, including many KFC, Taco Bell, Long John Silver's, and A&W locations. Jenkins also owns Morristown Driver's Services (MDS), a full-service, Logistics Provider, specializing in all phases of transportation management. His family is also the owner of Jenkin's Insurance in Dandridge.

Jenkins began his NASCAR career as a sponsor for a then-Busch Series (now Xfinity Series) entry driven by Brad Teague and fielded by longtime owner Jimmy Means. Jenkins began fielding Cup Series entries in 2004 with Means, taking full ownership of the team in 2005.

The Yum! Brands, most notably Taco Bell and Long John Silver's, as well as MDS often appear on the Front Row cars when the team does not have an outside sponsor, with funds coming from Jenkins himself.

The team shop is currently in Mooresville, North Carolina in the shop that used to house MDM Motorsports and Ranier Racing.

== NASCAR Cup Series ==
=== Car No. 4 history ===
Noah Gragson (2025–present)

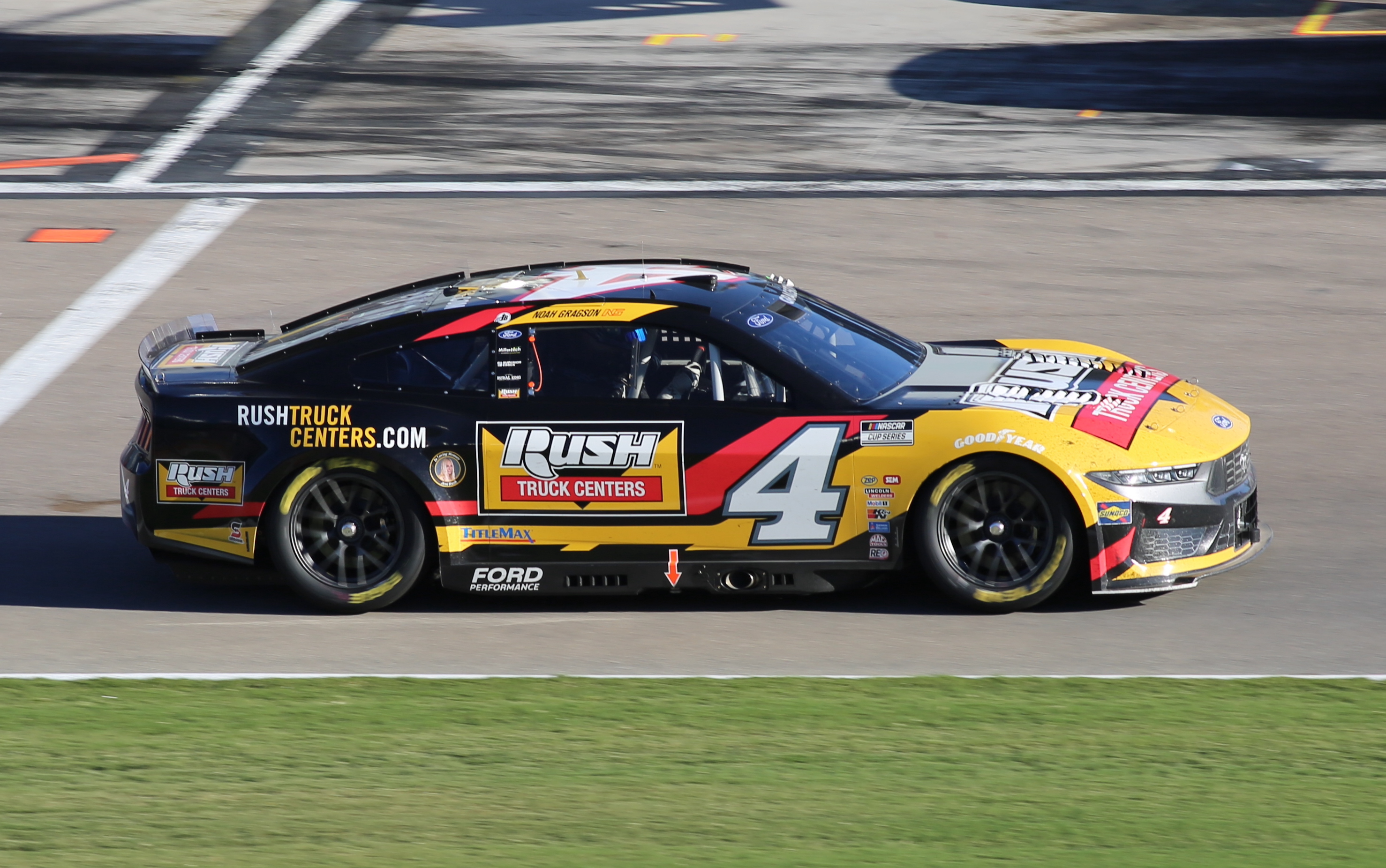
Noah Gragson in the No. 4 car at Las Vegas Motor Speedway in 2025

On July 10, 2024, Front Row Motorsports signed a multi-year deal with Noah Gragson to drive for the team starting in 2025. On January 3, 2025, FRM announced that Gragson would drive the No. 4 in 2025. He started the season with a 28th-place finish at the 2025 Daytona 500. He finished in fourth-place at Talladega in the Spring.

He remained with the team in 2026. He started the 2026 season with an 11th-place finish at the 2026 Daytona 500. He scored a 9th-place finish at the Spring Talladega race. On August 14, 2026, it was announced that Gragson signed a contract extension to remain at FRM for 2027.

==== Car No. 4 results ====
Year	Driver	No.	Make	1	2	3	4	5	6	7	8	9	10	11	12	13	14	15	16	17	18	19	20	21	22	23	24	25	26	27	28	29	30	31	32	33	34	35	36	Owners	Pts
2025	Noah Gragson	4	Ford	DAY; 28	ATL; 34	COA; 8	PHO; 26	LVS; 31	HOM; 16	MAR; 29	DAR; 19	BRI; 23	TAL; 4	TEX; 34	KAN; 14	CLT; 10	NSH; 38	MCH; 27	MXC; 30	POC; 23	ATL; 25	CSC; 30	SON; 37	DOV; 31	IND; 33	IOW; 29	GLN; 21	RCH; 27	DAY; 38	DAR; 14	GTW; 30	BRI; 23	NHA; 16	KAN; 23	ROV; 28	LVS; 13	TAL; 36	MAR; 30	PHO; 27	34th	440
2026	Noah Gragson	4	Ford	DAY; 11	ATL; 14	COA; 22	PHO; 36	LVS; 30	DAR; 26	MAR; 28	BRI; 26	KAN; 28	TAL; 9	TEX; 28	GLN; 22	CLT; 24	NSH; 16	MCH; 27	POC; 35	COR; 35	SON; 32	CHI; 27	ATL; 27	NWS; 25	IND; 22	IOW; 17	RCH; 18	NHA; 10	DAY; 26	DAR; 32	GTW; 33	BRI; 16	KAN; 36	LVS; 20	CLT; 25	PHO; 13	TAL; 20	MAR; 26	HOM; 9	31st	486

=== Car No. 26 history ===
Josh Wise (2012)

In 2012, Front Row Motorsports fielded to the No. 26 car. For Daytona, the car was sponsored by presidential candidate Rick Santorum, and driven by Tony Raines. Raines qualified for the race after being one of the three fastest "go or go home" drivers during the first day of qualifying. He finished nineteenth but ran as high as second. Rookie of the Year candidate Josh Wise took over the car starting at Phoenix and ran the majority of the season as a start-and-park operation. The only full race for the team besides Daytona was at Sonoma Raceway where Wise finished 30th. Despite running the majority of the season, Wise lost the ROTY honors to a late entrant Stephen Leicht.

==== Car No. 26 results ====
Year	Driver	No.	Make	1	2	3	4	5	6	7	8	9	10	11	12	13	14	15	16	17	18	19	20	21	22	23	24	25	26	27	28	29	30	31	32	33	34	35	36	Owners	Pts
2012	Tony Raines	26	Ford	DAY; 19																																				40th	172
2012	Josh Wise	26	Ford		PHO; 38	LVS; 40	BRI; 43	CAL; 37	MAR; 41	TEX; 39	KAN; 39	RCH; 38	TAL; 42	DAR; 43	CLT; 43	DOV; DNQ	POC; 42	MCH; 42	SON; 30	KEN; 41	DAY; 37	NHA; 38	IND; 37	POC; 37	GLN; 38	MCH; 40	BRI; 38	ATL; DNQ	RCH; 42	CHI; 38	NHA; DNQ	DOV; 37	TAL; 43	CLT; DNQ	KAN; DNQ	MAR; 38	TEX; 37	PHO; 37	HOM; 40	40th	172

=== Car No. 34 history ===
Mach 1 Racing (2004–2005)

The No. 34 car made its debut on March 14, 2004, at Atlanta Motor Speedway with Todd Bodine driving the car as the No. 98 Lucas Oil Ford. At the time, the team was owned by Chris Edwards and was known as "Mach 1 Racing". Bodine finished 41st after dropping out within sixteen laps. Bodine drove in eight races with the team that year, along with his brother Geoffrey, Larry Gunselman, Randy LaJoie, Chad Chaffin, and Derrike Cope filling out the driving duties that year, driving a total of 29 races.

In 2005 the team changed numbers to No. 34 and planned to run full-time, but due to sponsorship limitations and lackluster performance by LaJoie, the team only ran a limited schedule. Although it attempted many races, two drivers (Ted Christopher and P. J. Jones) each qualified for a race with the team that year. In the fall of 2005, the team website announced that the team was up for sale, but that was quickly rescinded. Later that year, Front Row Motorsports moved into their shop to operate the No. 34 in addition to their current team.

Multiple drivers (2006–2008)

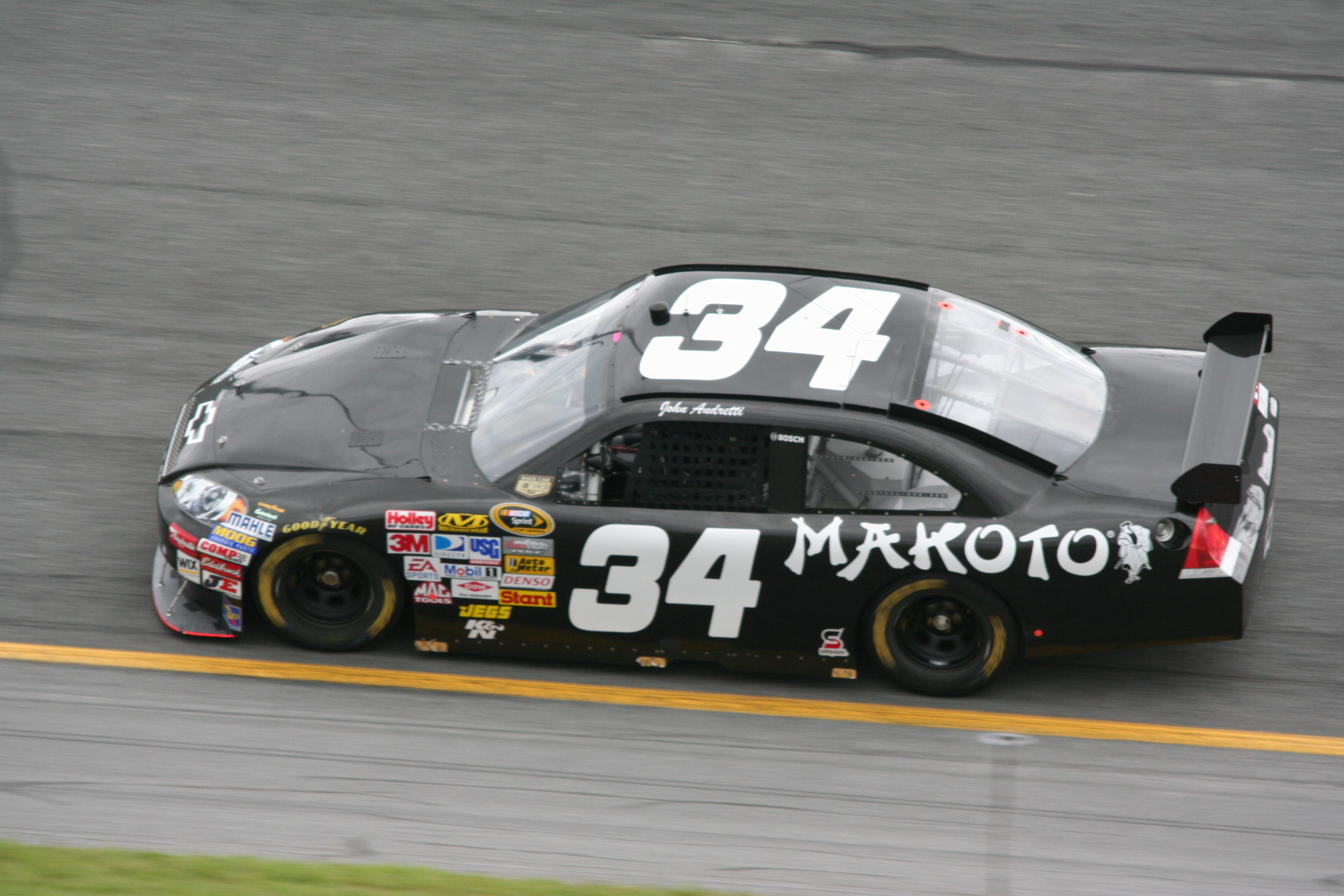
John Andretti in the No. 34 at Daytona in 2008.

The combined team began running at the 2006 Auto Club 500 with Randy LaJoie as the driver. However, he failed to qualify for the races. Lajoie and teammate Chaffin swapped rides the next week in Las Vegas and Chaffin would drive for the next eight races. Chaffin would then return to FRM's other car after Kevin Lepage's departure for BAM Racing, one week after FRM purchased the owner points from Peak Fitness Racing and renumbered the No. 92 to No. 61. Chad Blount would then take over the No. 34 car for two races, however, he was unable to get into the field and was released. Carl Long, Greg Sacks, Mike Skinner would attempt the next three races with Skinner making the 3M Performance 400 and finishing 37th on the lead lap. Johnny Miller returned to FRM to run the road course at Infineon. After Blount's release, Long, Sacks, Chaffin, Brian Simo, Kertus Davis, Skinner, and Joey McCarthy attempted races for the team, with Long qualifying at Bristol. Lepage drove the car for the rest of the season and made Martinsville.

The car attempted full-time status in 2007 with Lepage, but after missing the first four races, the team decided to go part-time with Andretti and Chaffin. Lepage swapped places with Andretti and Chaffin at the No. 37 so that Lepage could continue full-time. Chaffin later left the team in early 2007. They tried to make another attempt to run the No. 34 at Texas Motor Speedway with myAutoloan.com as the sponsor, but they failed to qualify for the race.

The 2008 season began with the No. 34 planning to run a full season. The team made the Daytona 500 with Andretti behind the wheel and Makoto's Ginger Dressing brand as the associate sponsor, and manufacturer's support from Chevrolet. Andretti left the team to race in the Indianapolis 500 with Roth Racing and eventually decided to continue in the series. Tony Raines qualified for his first race of the season in the No. 34 Chevrolet Impala SS at Dover but finished 40th after transmission failure. The No. 34 Chevy ran part-time after that, with Chad Chaffin attempting the final races for the team in 2008.

John Andretti (2009)

In 2009, John Andretti drove the car full-time, and the team entered into a partnership with Earnhardt Ganassi Racing. The No. 34 team received owner's points from EGR's defunct No. 15 team, becoming locked in for the first five races of the season. For the Daytona 500, Window World joined as the primary sponsor, and the car was fielded as a fourth EGR entry, with EGR crew chief Steve Lane and several EGR crewmembers tending to the car. The team finished 19th in the race. Window World ended up joining the team for the first five races of the season, and additional races later in the year. The team ran EGR engines at the Daytona 500 and the spring Atlanta race, using Pro Motors Engines otherwise. Steven Lane served as the full-time crew chief and some of the EGR crew became permanent employees. Beyond Window World's involvement, the team ran mostly unsponsored; team owner Bob Jenkins began using the space on the No. 34 Chevrolet Impala SS to advertise his Taco Bell restaurants while seeking a new primary sponsor. Andretti missed two races while he ran the Indianapolis 500, and teammate Tony Raines took his place for those events. Raines quickly earned the team's best solo effort finish to that point with a 25th place at Darlington. With John back at the wheel, the team finished 16th at the Lenox Industrial Tools 301 at New Hampshire Motor Speedway, along with numerous other top-thirty finishes throughout the year. At Michigan, race sponsor Carfax jumped aboard the No. 34 Chevrolet as the primary sponsor. The team remained in the top-35 for the entire season which guaranteed the team starts the first five races of 2010.

Travis Kvapil (2010)

For 2010, Travis Kvapil was the primary driver of the No. 34 Long John Silver's car, with the team switching to Ford and Roush/Yates providing engines and support for the team. Steve Lane returned to the Long John Silver's team with Kvapil. John Andretti drove the No. 34 in the Budweiser Shootout and the 2010 Daytona 500 with Window World as the primary sponsor, with Kvapil driving the No. 37 Extenze Ford in place of rookie teammate Kevin Conway. Kvapil and the No. 34 team's best finish of 2010 was an 18th at Talladega in the spring and finished 33rd in owners points after Kvapil, Andretti (both with the LJS crew), Kevin Conway, and Tony Raines (both with the Extenze / A&W Crew) ran races with the number.

David Gilliland (2011)

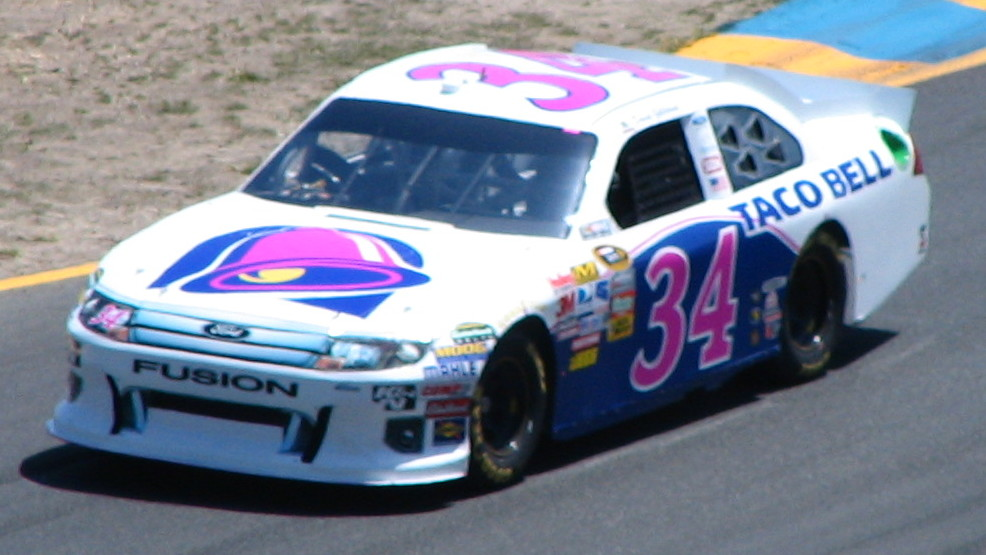
David Gilliland in the No. 34 during the 2011 Toyota/Save Mart 350.

In 2011, David Gilliland returned to Front Row Motorsports running the No. 34 Taco Bell Ford for the full season. He would go on to finish third in the 2011 Daytona 500, ninth in the 2011 Aaron's 499, and 12th in the 2011 Toyota/Save Mart 350. The third-place finish at Daytona was the beginning of FRM's noted success on restrictor-plate tracks.

David Ragan (2012–2015)

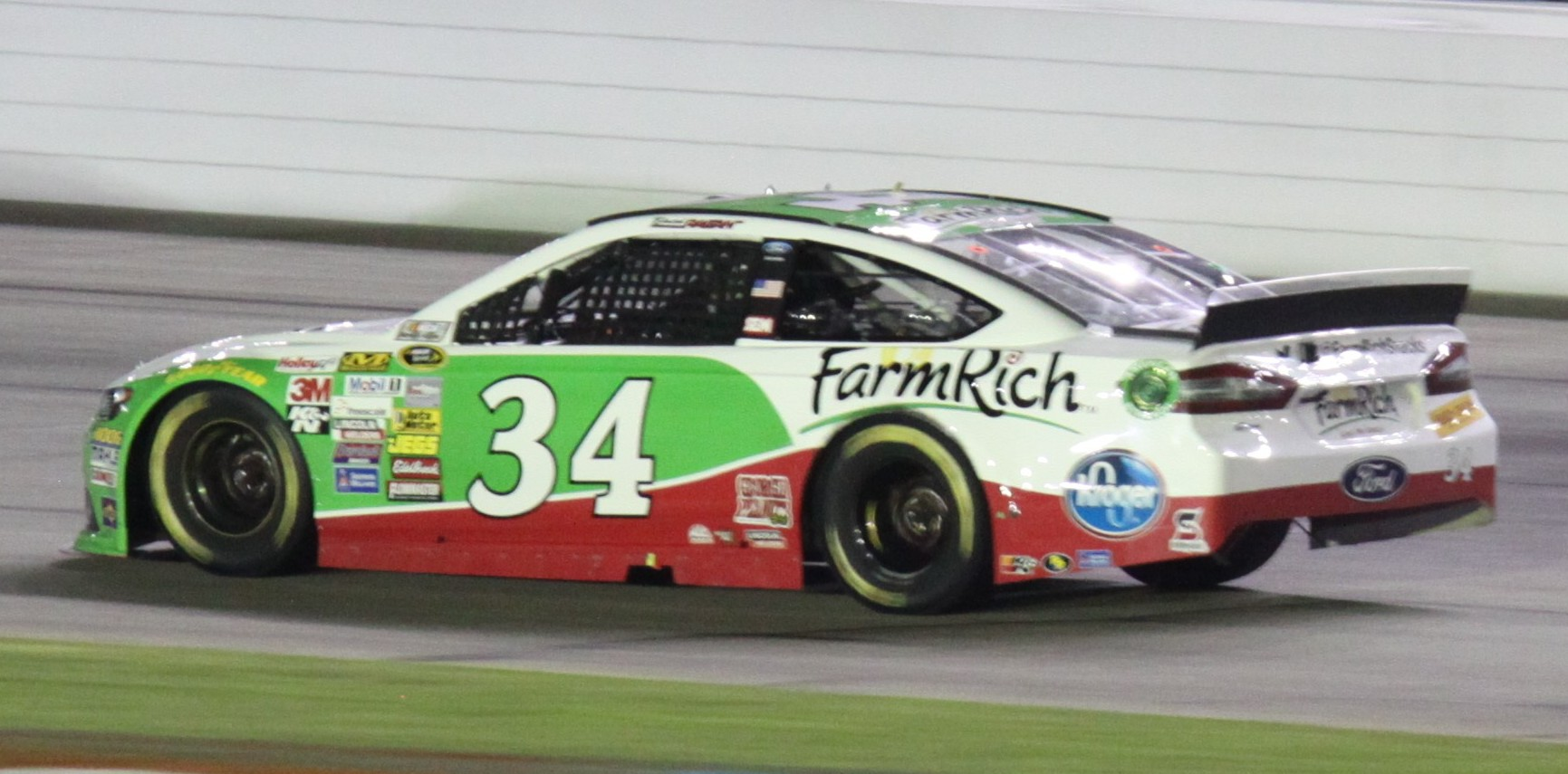
David Ragan in the No. 34 at Atlanta Motor Speedway in 2014.

For 2012, former Roush Fenway Racing driver David Ragan drove the car full-time. Ragan helped the team improve slightly, with a best finish of 4th at Talladega in October. He recorded two top-ten finishes throughout the season, both at Talladega.

Ragan got the team its first win at Talladega Superspeedway in the 2013 Aaron's 499 on a last-lap pass. Along with David Gilliland's help, the team was able to finish one-two. The win was also the first for a car using No. 34 since Wendell Scott in 1964. The No. 34 team improved more in 2013 earning sixteen top-25 finishes including the win, a sixth-place finish at the fall Talladega race, and a twelfth place finish at the night race at Bristol. However, three consecutive engine failures near the end of the season dropped Ragan to 28th in points.

Ragan returned as the driver for 2014, with sponsors CSX and Farm Rich (which sponsored the team's win at Talladega) stepping up their commitments. The team struggled to adapt to the new no ride-height rule for the 2014 season and wasn't helped by the struggles of all the Roush-Yates engines teams all year long. Ragan was outside the top-thirty in points near the end of the season. However, the No. 34 car got a boost at the October Martinsville race, when it finally scored its first top-ten of the season. In the race, Ragan drove a tribute baby blue paint scheme dedicated to the late Wendell Scott, the last driver before Ragan to win using the number 34.

Ragan returned to the team in 2015. With KFC sponsoring, Ragan came back from a lap down in his Duel race to qualify for the Daytona 500 (his points had been moved to the No. 35 car), where he later finished 17th. After the 500, Ragan temporarily left the team to drive for Joe Gibbs Racing in place of an injured Kyle Busch. Ragan was originally scheduled to return to the No. 34 upon Busch's return to the series, but in April, circumstances led to him to instead leave for Michael Waltrip Racing to replace an ailing Brian Vickers for the rest of the season.

Brett Moffitt (2015)

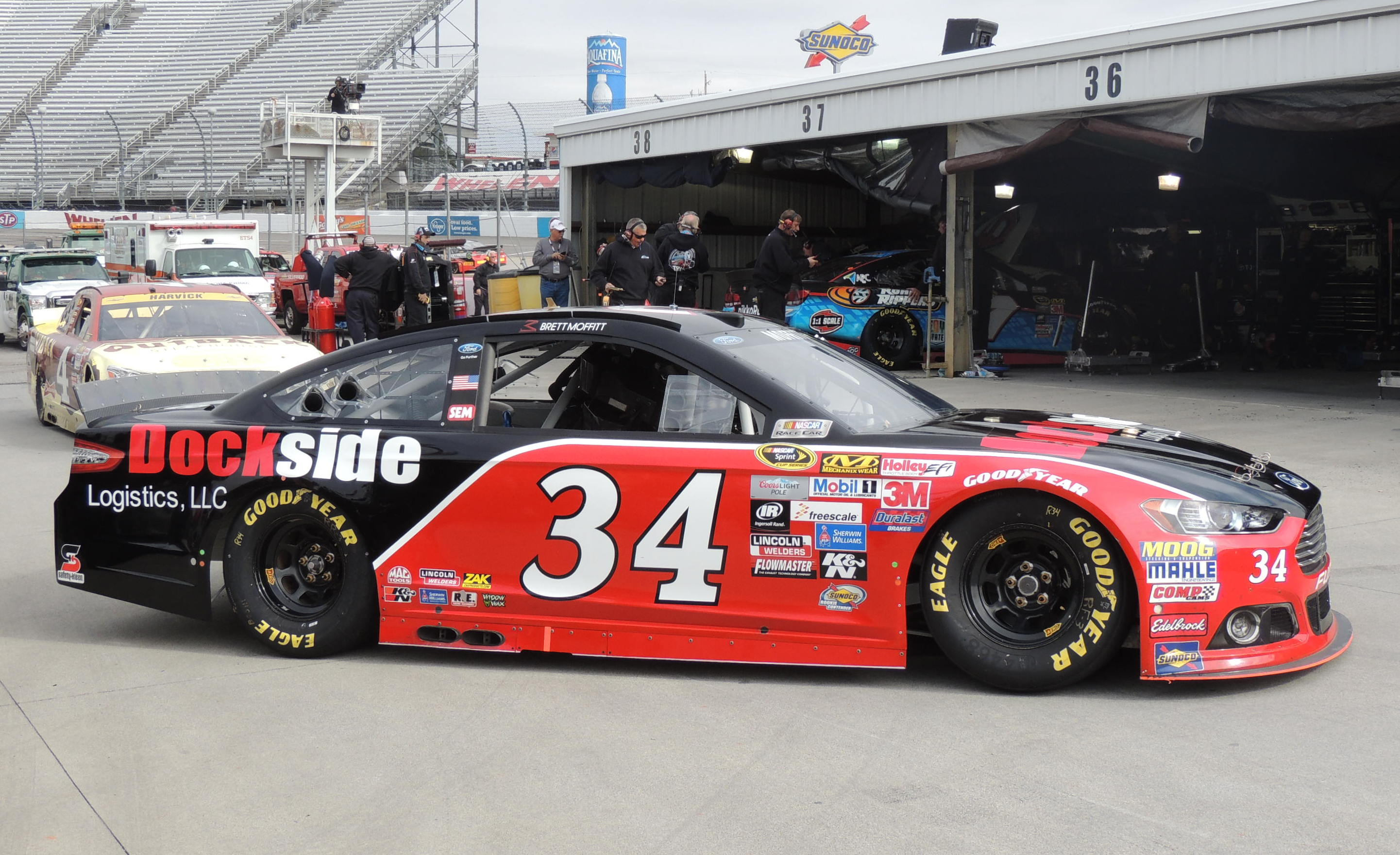
Brett Moffitt in the No. 34 at Martinsville Speedway in 2015.

Meanwhile, Joe Nemechek took over the No. 34 at Atlanta, the first of an eight-race sponsorship from CSX. Brett Moffitt took over the No. 34 at Las Vegas and Phoenix, with Chris Buescher driving the car for the next four races along with Talladega and Reed Sorenson driving at Richmond. In May 2015, Moffitt, competing for Rookie of the Year honors, was named the driver for the remainder of the season, though Justin Marks took over at Sonoma, Buescher drove the car at Watkins Glen, and Josh Wise ran the fall Talladega race. Despite not running the full season, Moffitt earned Cup Series Rookie of the Year honors.

Chris Buescher (2016)

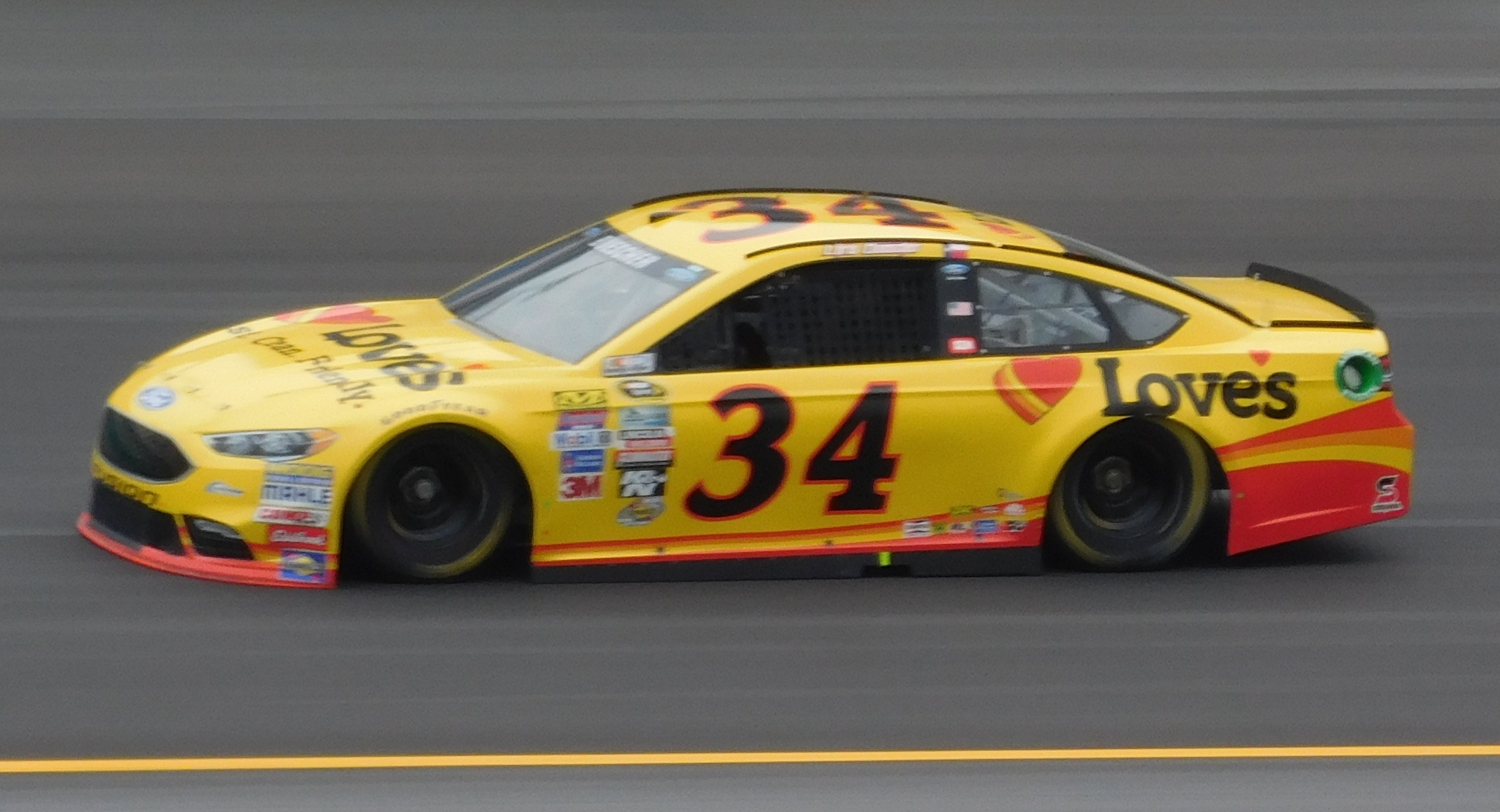
Chris Buescher in the No. 34 at Kentucky Speedway in 2016.

On December 10, 2015, it was announced that reigning Xfinity Series champion Chris Buescher would drive the No. 34 for the 2016 season, as part of FRM's new alliance with Roush Fenway Racing. Bob Osborne replaced Derrick Finley as crew chief for the No. 34. Finley then became Front Row's technical director. It was later announced that longtime FRM sponsor Love's Travel Stops would be moving to the No. 34 in 2016 (after sponsoring the No. 38 since 2013). CSX also returned to the team for eight races. Buescher, in one of the biggest upsets in recent NASCAR history, won a fog-shortened Pennsylvania 400 at Pocono, after taking the lead in the final 15 laps. It was Buescher's first win in the Cup Series and the team's second Cup Series victory. Buescher, with the win, became the first driver since Joey Logano in 2009 to win a race as a Cup Series Rookie of the Year candidate (In 2011, Trevor Bayne won a race during his part-time rookie season but was not running for the Cup Series Rookie of the Year award). Buescher later moved up to 29th in points following Richmond, locking him into the Chase. It was the first-ever Chase berth for a Front Row Motorsports entry. Buescher began the Chase in the 13th position in points, but three sub-par finishes cost him a chance to move on to the second round. He finished sixteenth in points, a career-best for the team. Buescher later departed for JTG Daugherty Racing following the season's conclusion.

Landon Cassill (2017)

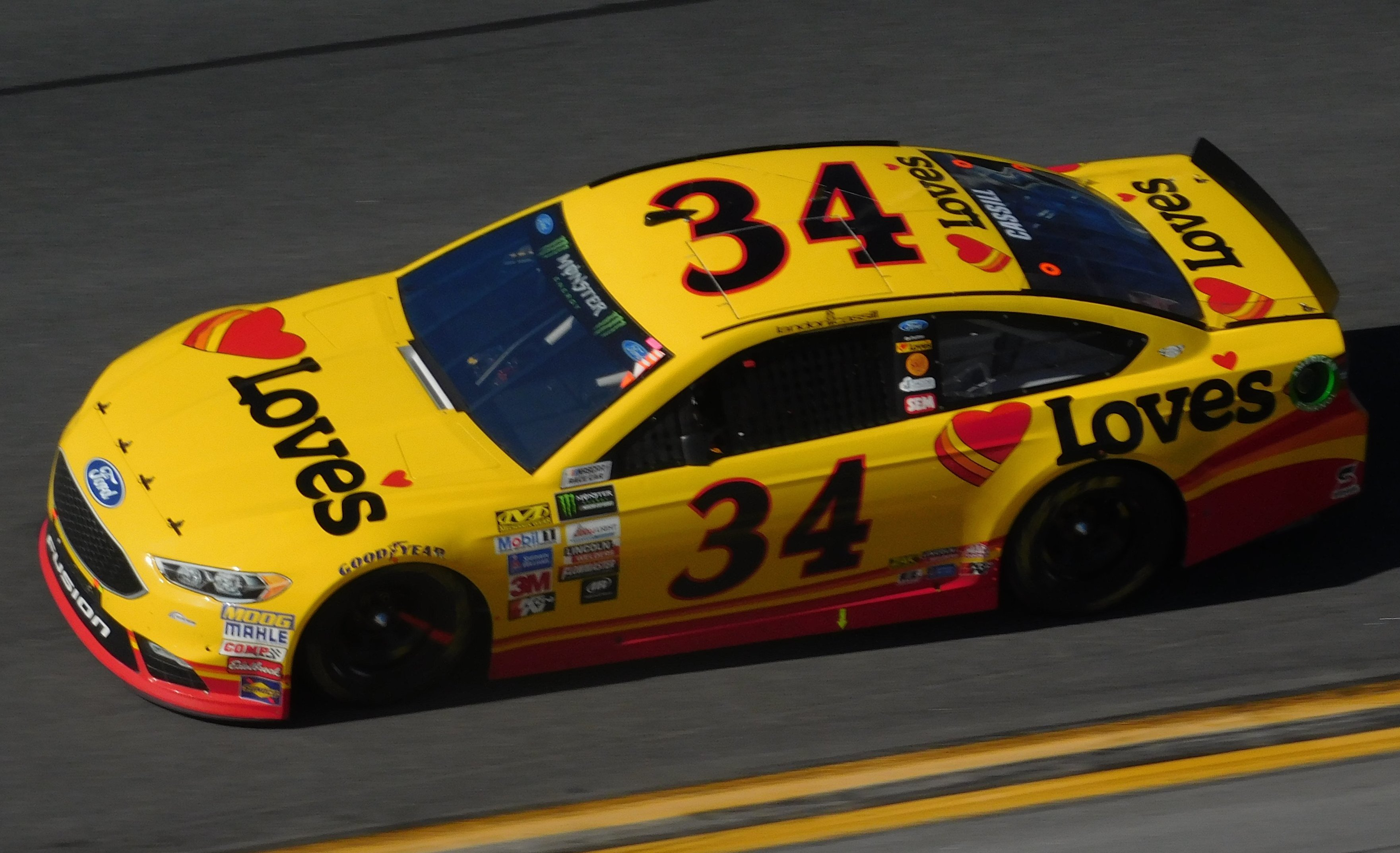
Cassill's No. 34 during the 2017 Daytona 500

It was announced on December 16, 2016, that Landon Cassill would shift over from the #38 car to replace Buescher. His best finish in the 2017 season was sixteenth at the Daytona 500. After only one year of having Cassill in the car, it was announced on October 10, 2017, that he would not be returning to the car or Front Row Motorsports.

Michael McDowell (2018–2024)

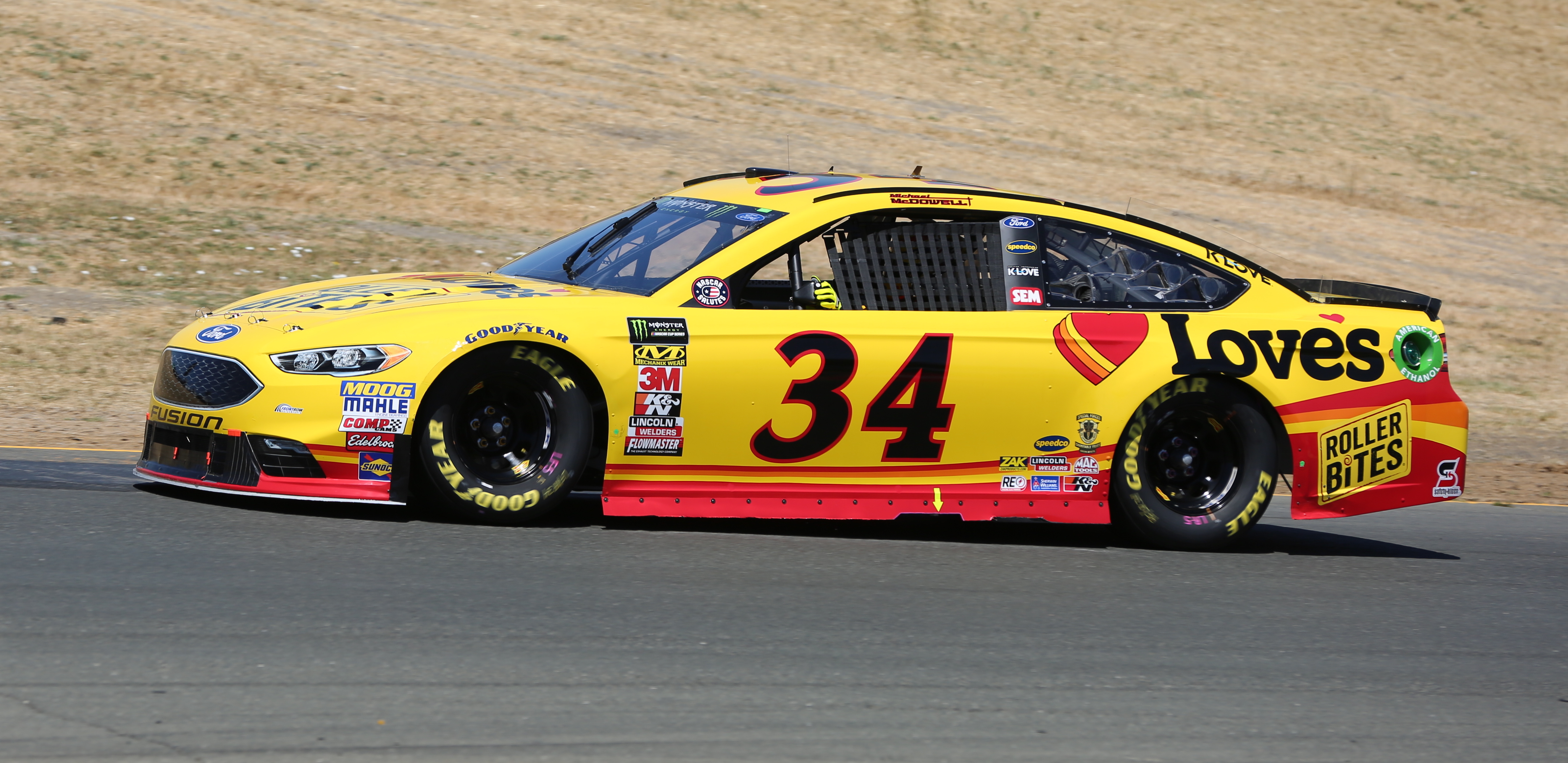
Michael McDowell in the No. 34 at Sonoma Raceway in 2018

Michael McDowell was later announced as Cassill's replacement for 2018. During the season, he only scored one top-ten finish at the Daytona 500 and ended up 26th in the standings. McDowell started the 2019 season with a fifth-place finish at the Daytona 500, later scoring another top-five at the fall Talladega race.

On December 12, 2019, FRM announced that McDowell will return to the No. 34 for the 2020 season. He scored four top-10s and finished the season 23rd in the standings, a new career best.

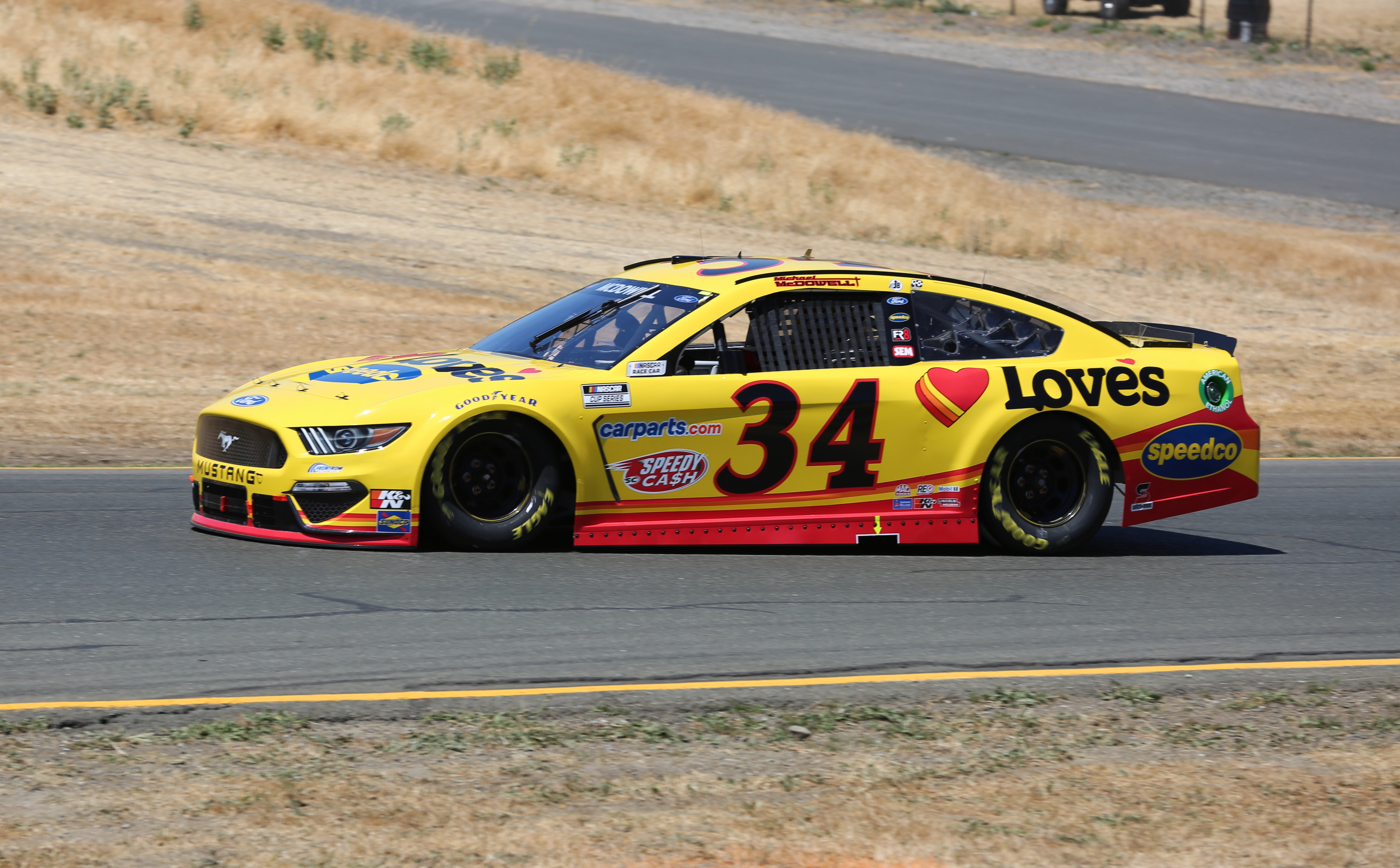
Michael McDowell in the No. 34 at Sonoma Raceway in 2021.

McDowell began the 2021 season by winning the 2021 Daytona 500; it was his first NASCAR Cup Series win, in his 358th Cup race. He was a 100-1 underdog. He would go on to finish inside the top 10 in the first three races of the season.

McDowell started the 2022 season with a seventh place finish at the 2022 Daytona 500. He scored seven top-ten finishes during the regular season. On July 26, crew chief Blake Harris was suspended for four races and fined US$100,000 for an L2 Penalty during post-race inspection after the 2022 M&M's Fan Appreciation 400 at Pocono. The penalty came under Sections 14.1 C, D and Q and 14.5 A and B in the NASCAR Rule Book, both of which pertain to the body and overall vehicle assembly rules surrounding modification of a single-source supplied part. In addition, the No. 34 team was docked 100 driver and owner points and 10 playoff points.

McDowell began the 2023 season with a 28th-place finish at the 2023 Daytona 500. He dominated the Indianapolis road race, landing him in the playoffs and earning him his second career win. McDowell was eliminated at the conclusion of the Round of 16.

On May 8, 2024, McDowell announced he would leave FRM at the end of the 2024 season and he had signed a multi-year contract with Spire Motorsports to drive the No. 71 Chevrolet starting in 2025.

Todd Gilliland (2025–present)

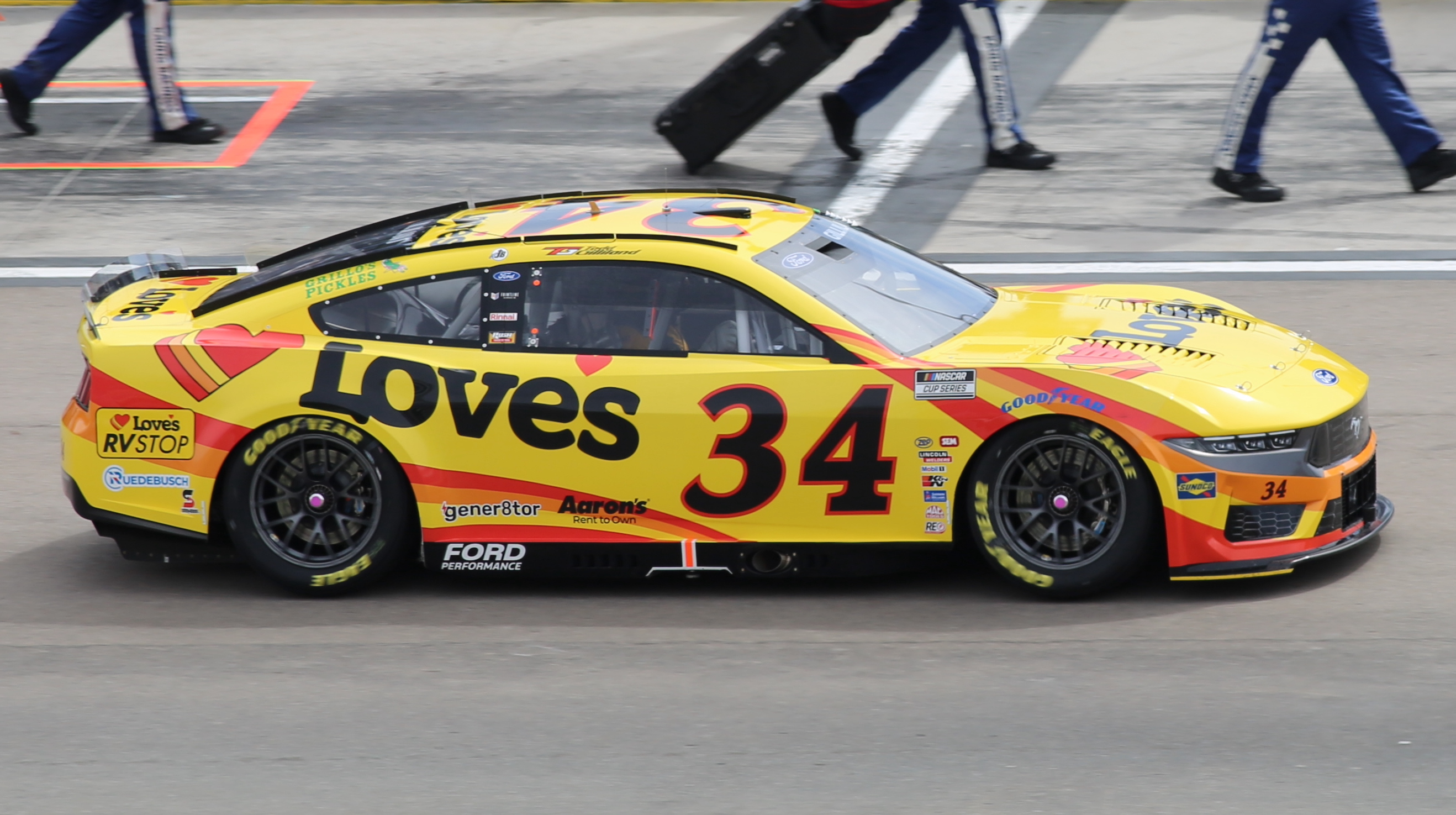
Todd Gilliland in the No. 34 car at Las Vegas Motor Speedway in 2025

On November 19, 2024, FRM announced that Todd Gilliland would move to the No. 34 in 2025. He started the season with a 27th-place finish at the 2025 Daytona 500. He finished 2nd at Talladega in the Fall.

Gilliland started the 2026 season with a 39th-place DNF at the 2026 Daytona 500. At Pocono, he won his first career stage. On July 17, 2026, it was announced that Gilliland signed a contract extension to remain at FRM for 2027. On July 26th, 2026, Gilliland won the NASCAR In-Season Challenge in a major upset, beginning as the #25 seed at the beginning of the tournament, and managing to outpace his competition in each round.

==== Car No. 34 results ====
Year	Driver	No.	Make	1	2	3	4	5	6	7	8	9	10	11	12	13	14	15	16	17	18	19	20	21	22	23	24	25	26	27	28	29	30	31	32	33	34	35	36	Owners	Pts
2006	Randy LaJoie	34	Dodge	DAY	CAL; DNQ																																			43rd	1001
2006	Chad Chaffin	34	Chevy			LVS; 42	ATL; DNQ	BRI; DNQ	MAR; 36	TEX; DNQ	PHO; DNQ	TAL; 30	RCH; DNQ																											43rd	1001
2006	Chad Blount	34	Chevy											DAR; DNQ	CLT; DNQ														RCH; 42	NHA; DNQ	DOV; DNQ	KAN; DNQ								43rd	1001
2006	Carl Long	34	Chevy													DOV; DNQ					CHI; DNQ						BRI; 41													43rd	1001
2006	Greg Sacks	34	Chevy														POC; DNQ						POC; DNQ																	43rd	1001
2006	Mike Skinner	34	Chevy															MCH; 37								MCH; DNQ														43rd	1001
2006	Johnny Miller	34	Chevy																SON; DNQ																					43rd	1001
2006	Chad Blount	34	Dodge																	DAY; DNQ																				43rd	1001
2006	Joey McCarthy	34	Chevy																			NHA; DNQ																		43rd	1001
2006	Chad Chaffin	34	Dodge																					IND; 39													TEX; DNQ		HOM; DNQ	43rd	1001
2006	Brian Simo	34	Chevy																						GLN; 41															43rd	1001
2006	Kertus Davis	34	Chevy																									CAL; DNQ												43rd	1001
2006	Kevin Lepage	34	Dodge																														TAL; DNQ							43rd	1001
2006	Kevin Lepage	34	Chevy																															CLT; DNQ	MAR; 43	ATL		PHO; DNQ		43rd	1001
2007	Kevin Lepage	34	Dodge	DAY; DNQ	CAL; DNQ	LVS; DNQ	ATL; DNQ	BRI	MAR	TEX; DNQ	PHO	TAL; DNQ	RCH	DAR	CLT	DOV	POC	MCH	SON	NHA	DAY	CHI	IND	POC	GLN	MCH											TEX; DNQ	PHO	HOM	56th	106
2007	Stanton Barrett	34	Dodge																								BRI; DNQ	CAL	RCH	NHA	DOV	KAN	TAL	CLT	MAR	ATL				56th	106
2008	John Andretti	34	Chevy	DAY; 40	CAL; 35	LVS; DNQ	ATL; DNQ	BRI; DNQ	MAR; DNQ	TEX; 40	PHO; DNQ	TAL; DNQ	RCH; DNQ																											46th	764
2008	Jeff Green	34	Chevy											DAR; DNQ	CLT; DNQ												BRI; DNQ	CAL												46th	764
2008	Tony Raines	34	Chevy													DOV; 40	POC	MCH; DNQ		NHA; DNQ	DAY	CHI; DNQ	IND; DNQ						RCH; DNQ	NHA; DNQ										46th	764
2008	Brian Simo	34	Ford																SON; 43																					46th	764
2008	Chad Chaffin	34	Chevy																					POC; DNQ							DOV; DNQ	KAN	TAL	CLT	MAR	ATL	TEX	PHO	HOM	46th	764
2008	Brian Simo	34	Chevy																						GLN; DNQ	MCH														46th	764
2009	John Andretti	34	Chevy	DAY; 19	CAL; 31	LVS; 28	ATL; 29	BRI; 34	MAR; 35	TEX; 26	PHO; 38	TAL; 27	RCH; 32			DOV; 34	POC; 35	MCH; 33	SON; 30	NHA; 16	DAY; 27	CHI; 30	IND; 32	POC; 30	GLN; 30	MCH; 28	BRI; 30	ATL; 31	RCH; 29	NHA; 26	DOV; 27	KAN; 33	CAL; 19	CLT; 36	MAR; 26	TAL; 23	TEX; 24	PHO; 34	HOM; 33	35th	2731
2009	Tony Raines	34	Chevy											DAR; 25	CLT; 39																									35th	2731
2010	John Andretti	34	Ford	DAY; 38																																				34th	2564
2010	Travis Kvapil	34	Ford		CAL; 30	LVS; 24	ATL; 30	BRI; 25	MAR; 27	PHO; 36	TEX; 24	TAL; 18	RCH; 34	DAR; 26	DOV; 29												BRI; 22	ATL; 29			DOV; 33	KAN; 33	CAL; 28	CLT; 31			TEX; 41		HOM; 34	34th	2564
2010	Kevin Conway	34	Ford													CLT; 35	POC; 35	MCH; 40	SON; 28	NHA; 23	DAY; 14	CHI; 33	IND; 34	POC; 31	GLN; 31															34th	2564
2010	Tony Raines	34	Ford																							MCH; 31			RCH; 38	NHA; 34					MAR; 32			PHO; 36		34th	2564
2010	Robert Richardson Jr.	34	Ford																																	TAL; 37				34th	2564
2011	David Gilliland	34	Ford	DAY; 3	PHO; 22	LVS; 37	BRI; 27	CAL; 31	MAR; 33	TEX; 42	TAL; 9	RCH; 25	DAR; 32	DOV; 22	CLT; 33	KAN; 33	POC; 29	MCH; 29	SON; 12	DAY; 16	KEN; 31	NHA; 25	IND; 33	POC; 23	GLN; 33	MCH; 32	BRI; 24	ATL; 37	RCH; 27	CHI; 36	NHA; 32	DOV; 28	KAN; 32	CLT; 36	TAL; 22	MAR; 34	TEX; 32	PHO; 31	HOM; 33	30th	572
2012	David Ragan	34	Ford	DAY; 43	PHO; 25	LVS; 21	BRI; 23	CAL; 31	MAR; 24	TEX; 35	KAN; 30	RCH; 32	TAL; 7	DAR; 28	CLT; 35	DOV; 21	POC; 27	MCH; 23	SON; 27	KEN; 29	DAY; 26	NHA; 34	IND; 28	POC; 28	GLN; 22	MCH; 23	BRI; 32	ATL; 28	RCH; 32	CHI; 22	NHA; 29	DOV; 30	TAL; 4	CLT; 34	KAN; 20	MAR; 26	TEX; 28	PHO; 33	HOM; 31	28th	622
2013	David Ragan	34	Ford	DAY; 35	PHO; 38	LVS; 31	BRI; 21	CAL; 24	MAR; 30	TEX; 26	KAN; 30	RCH; 20	TAL; 1	DAR; 39	CLT; 25	DOV; 22	POC; 37	MCH; 25	SON; 33	KEN; 26	DAY; 22	NHA; 19	IND; 34	POC; 21	GLN; 21	MCH; 24	BRI; 12	ATL; 23	RCH; 29	CHI; 26	NHA; 29	DOV; 25	KAN; 36	CLT; 30	TAL; 6	MAR; 43	TEX; 42	PHO; 35	HOM; 29	28th	633
2014	David Ragan	34	Ford	DAY; 34	PHO; 28	LVS; 32	BRI; 31	CAL; 27	MAR; 28	TEX; 35	DAR; 32	RCH; 30	TAL; 35	KAN; 38	CLT; 31	DOV; 36	POC; 18	MCH; 38	SON; 36	KEN; 31	DAY; 22	NHA; 25	IND; 35	POC; 19	GLN; 19	MCH; 24	BRI; 23	ATL; 27	RCH; 33	CHI; 31	NHA; 42	DOV; 31	KAN; 27	CLT; 34	TAL; 30	MAR; 10	TEX; 32	PHO; 25	HOM; 30	32nd	531
2015	David Ragan	34	Ford	DAY; 17																																				34th	472
2015	Joe Nemechek	34	Ford		ATL; 33																																			34th	472
2015	Brett Moffitt	34	Ford			LVS; 37	PHO; 32							KAN; 34	CLT; 31	DOV; 28	POC; 30	MCH; 33		DAY; 27	KEN; 32	NHA; 33	IND; 34	POC; 31		MCH; 34	BRI; 30	DAR; 36	RCH; 35	CHI; 31	NHA; 27	DOV; 42	CLT; 30	KAN; 32		MAR; 35	TEX; 30	PHO; 36	HOM; 31	34th	472
2015	Chris Buescher	34	Ford					CAL; 20	MAR; 24	TEX; 30	BRI; 25		TAL; 24												GLN; 37															34th	472
2015	Reed Sorenson	34	Ford									RCH; 34																												34th	472
2015	Justin Marks	34	Ford																SON; 30																					34th	472
2015	Josh Wise	34	Ford																																TAL; 29					34th	472
2016	Chris Buescher	34	Ford	DAY; 39	ATL; 28	LVS; 26	PHO; 30	CAL; 33	MAR; 33	TEX; 28	BRI; 21	RCH; 34	TAL; 37	KAN; 24	DOV; 18	CLT; 37	POC; 25	MCH; 20	SON; 30	DAY; 40	KEN; 37	NHA; 29	IND; 14	POC; 1	GLN; 30	BRI; 5	MCH; 35	DAR; 17	RCH; 24	CHI; 28	NHA; 30	DOV; 23	CLT; 16	KAN; 21	TAL; 22	MAR; 27	TEX; 21	PHO; 32	HOM; 24	16th	2169
2017	Landon Cassill	34	Ford	DAY; 16	ATL; 22	LVS; 27	PHO; 28	CAL; 27	MAR; 27	TEX; 29	BRI; 32	RCH; 21	TAL; 29	KAN; 21	CLT; 28	DOV; 36	POC; 27	MCH; 32	SON; 30	DAY; 19	KEN; 26	NHA; 23	IND; 22	POC; 29	GLN; 36	MCH; 25	BRI; 35	DAR; 21	RCH; 39	CHI; 20	NHA; 25	DOV; 29	CLT; 25	TAL; 28	KAN; 23	MAR; 23	TEX; 26	PHO; 24	HOM; 23	31st	382
2018	Michael McDowell	34	Ford	DAY; 9	ATL; 24	LVS; 37	PHO; 32	CAL; 26	MAR; 21	TEX; 14	BRI; 38	RCH; 31	TAL; 32	DOV; 22	KAN; 20	CLT; 18	POC; 21	MCH; 25	SON; 21	CHI; 21	DAY; 26	KEN; 24	NHA; 26	POC; 16	GLN; 18	MCH; 25	BRI; 37	DAR; 20	IND; 17	LVS; 29	RCH; 24	CLT; 18	DOV; 26	TAL; 40	KAN; 27	MAR; 25	TEX; 29	PHO; 16	HOM; 28	28th	493
2019	Michael McDowell	34	Ford	DAY; 5	ATL; 37	LVS; 30	PHO; 36	CAL; 24	MAR; 31	TEX; 15	BRI; 28	RCH; 36	TAL; 40	DOV; 24	KAN; 26	CLT; 22	POC; 20	MCH; 27	SON; 25	CHI; 20	DAY; 13	KEN; 25	NHA; 17	POC; 25	GLN; 16	MCH; 22	BRI; 37	DAR; 38	IND; 17	LVS; 24	RCH; 21	CLT; 12	DOV; 24	TAL; 5	KAN; 24	MAR; 23	TEX; 25	PHO; 30	HOM; 26	27th	485
2020	Michael McDowell	34	Ford	DAY; 14	LVS; 36	CAL; 22	PHO; 16	DAR; 23	DAR; 17	CLT; 18	CLT; 25	BRI; 14	ATL; 24	MAR; 14	HOM; 15	TAL; 18	POC; 8	POC; 40	IND; 7	KEN; 24	TEX; 15	KAN; 16	NHA; 19	MCH; 29	MCH; 28	DAY; 10	DOV; 26	DOV; 25	DAY; 14	DAR; 16	RCH; 25	BRI; 10	LVS; 21	TAL; 36	CLT; 32	KAN; 19	TEX; 26	MAR; 28	PHO; 23	25th	588
2021	Michael McDowell	34	Ford	DAY; 1	DAY; 8	HOM; 6	LVS; 17	PHO; 23	ATL; 19	BRI; 12	MAR; 31	RCH; 27	TAL; 3	KAN; 13	DAR; 27	DOV; 25	COA; 7	CLT; 20	SON; 28	NSH; 16	POC; 19	POC; 17	ROA; 30	ATL; 27	NHA; 25	GLN; 21	IND; 30	MCH; 20	DAY; 39	DAR; 37	RCH; 28	BRI; 24	LVS; 21	TAL; 17	CLT; 16	TEX; 17	KAN; 16	MAR; 26	PHO; 24	16th	2152
2022	Michael McDowell	34	Ford	DAY; 7	CAL; 31	LVS; 27	PHO; 27	ATL; 24	COA; 13	RCH; 30	MAR; 25	BRI; 9	TAL; 8	DOV; 17	DAR; 7	KAN; 23	CLT; 8	GTW; 18	SON; 3	NSH; 13	ROA; 8	ATL; 15	NHA; 28	POC; 6	IND; 8	MCH; 28	RCH; 29	GLN; 6	DAY; 32	DAR; 6	KAN; 16	BRI; 11	TEX; 11	TAL; 3	CLT; 27	LVS; 19	HOM; 16	MAR; 17	PHO; 25	23rd	663
2023	Michael McDowell	34	Ford	DAY; 28	CAL; 18	LVS; 25	PHO; 13	ATL; 21	COA; 12	RCH; 6	BRD; 11	MAR; 19	TAL; 35	DOV; 22	KAN; 26	DAR; 33	CLT; 28	GTW; 9	SON; 7	NSH; 28	CSC; 7	ATL; 4	NHA; 13	POC; 19	RCH; 22	MCH; 24	IRC; 1*	GLN; 36	DAY; 13	DAR; 32	KAN; 26	BRI; 6	TEX; 15	TAL; 21	ROV; 32	LVS; 16	HOM; 22	MAR; 25	PHO; 9	15th	2185
2024	Michael McDowell	34	Ford	DAY; 36	ATL; 8	LVS; 25	PHO; 8	BRI; 11	COA; 38	RCH; 26	MAR; 21	TEX; 35	TAL; 31*	DOV; 36	KAN; 9	DAR; 10	CLT; 16	GTW; 25	SON; 2	IOW; 23	NHA; 15	NSH; 35	CSC; 5	POC; 24	IND; 16	RCH; 15	MCH; 19	DAY; 30	DAR; 28	ATL; 22	GLN; 7	BRI; 11	KAN; 29	TAL; 37*	ROV; 15	LVS; 20	HOM; 14	MAR; 33	PHO; 31	23rd	624
2025	Todd Gilliland	34	Ford	DAY; 27	ATL; 15	COA; 10	PHO; 17	LVS; 29	HOM; 30	MAR; 10	DAR; 14	BRI; 35	TAL; 16	TEX; 11	KAN; 12	CLT; 18	NSH; 22	MCH; 33	MXC; 22	POC; 28	ATL; 27	CSC; 38	SON; 22	DOV; 25	IND; 6	IOW; 34	GLN; 28	RCH; 25	DAY; 11	DAR; 31	GTW; 32	BRI; 27	NHA; 19	KAN; 12	ROV; 17	LVS; 21	TAL; 2	MAR; 9	PHO; 22	27th	616
2026	Todd Gilliland	34	Ford	DAY; 39	ATL; 25	COA; 21	PHO; 12	LVS; 34	DAR; 23	MAR; 23	BRI; 6	KAN; 17	TAL; 11	TEX; 32	GLN; 17	CLT; 20	NSH; 20	MCH; 22	POC; 19	COR; 21	SON; 29	CHI; 16	ATL; 19	NWS; 8	IND; 24	IOW; 22	RCH; 30	NHA; 21	DAY; 19	DAR; 16	GTW; 24	BRI; 19	KAN; 19	LVS; 33	CLT; 22	PHO; 14	TAL; 7	MAR; 15	HOM; 18	22nd	656

=== Car No. 35 history ===
Josh Wise (2013)

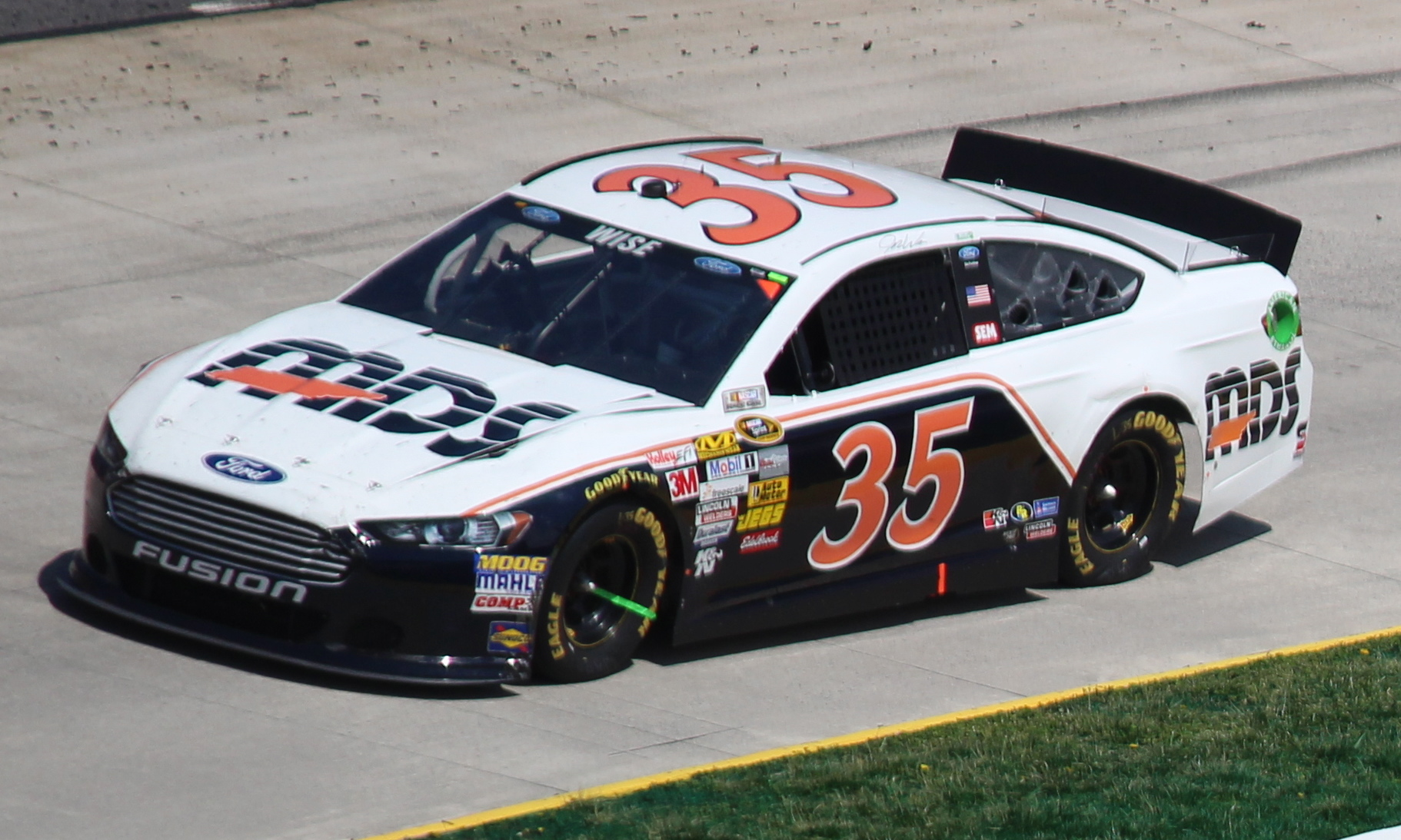
The No. 35 MDS Ford driven by Josh Wise at Martinsville in 2013.

In 2013, FRM fielded the No. 35, and the team attempted the full schedule with Josh Wise. Due to a lack of sponsorship, the team planned to run twenty-thirty full races, while starting and parking in the remaining events. Wise picked up sponsorship from Blockbuster Video and Cajun Industries for the Daytona 500, where Wise finished 40th after a crash. Michael McDowell stepped into the car at Watkins Glen International with sponsor Dockside Logistics. A skilled road course racer, McDowell qualified twelfth but finished 38th after suspension issues. On November 26, 2013, Wise announced that he would be leaving the team, moving to Phil Parsons Racing.

Multiple drivers (2014)

In 2014, the No. 35 ran with various drivers. Eric McClure attempted the 2014 Daytona 500 with longtime sponsors Hefty and Reynolds Wrap but failed to qualify. Blake Koch attempted the next two races, finishing 37th at Phoenix. David Reutimann was placed in the car for six races starting at Bristol, making the field at Auto Club, Texas and Richmond. McClure then returned for the Aaron's 499, where he once again failed to qualify. The No. 35 did not make another attempt for the rest of 2014.

Cole Whitt (2015)

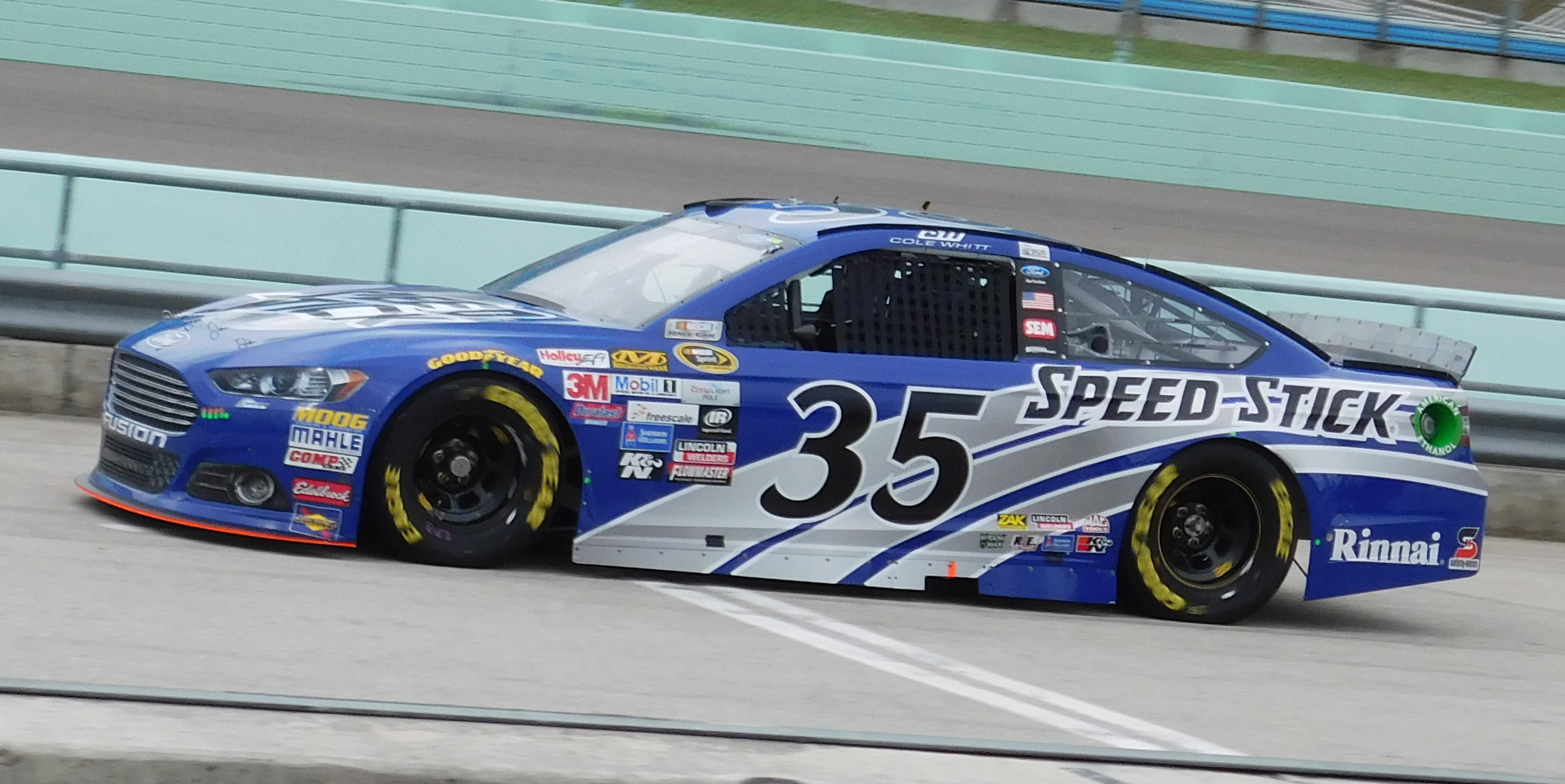
Whitt's No. 35 Front Row Motorsports car at Homestead–Miami Speedway in 2015

After several rumors that No. 34 driver David Ragan would be replaced with BK Racing driver Cole Whitt, in January 2015, it was announced that Whitt would move to the No. 35 team, bringing sponsors Speed Stick GEAR (10 races) and Rinnai. Crew chief Randy Cox would also move from BK Racing to head the team. The owner's points for the No. 34 and No. 35 were switched, allowing Whitt a better chance of making races. Whitt successfully qualified for the Daytona 500 and finished 22nd in the race. After an up and down season, Whitt and the No. 35 finished 31st in both driver and owner points at the season's end. In 2016, Whitt moved to Premium Motorsports to drive the No. 98.

David Gilliland (2016)

David Gilliland, who had been ousted from the No. 38 after Landon Cassill took over the ride, attempted the Daytona 500, but failed to qualify. Gilliland did make the field however for the next restrictor-plate race at Talladega. He started 39th and finished 17th. On July 2, 2016, David Gilliland qualified the #35 car for the Coke Zero 400 at Daytona International Speedway and finished 19th on the lead lap during the race. He then failed to make the fall Talladega race.

==== Car No. 35 results ====
Year	Driver	No.	Make	1	2	3	4	5	6	7	8	9	10	11	12	13	14	15	16	17	18	19	20	21	22	23	24	25	26	27	28	29	30	31	32	33	34	35	36	Owners	Pts
2013	Josh Wise	35	Ford	DAY; 40	PHO; 35	LVS; 35	BRI; 26	CAL; 40	MAR; 35	TEX; 30	KAN; 26	RCH; 28	TAL; 19	DAR; 38	CLT; 26	DOV; 25	POC; 34	MCH; 40	SON; 32	KEN; 39	DAY; 25	NHA; 35	IND; 38	POC; 41		MCH; 39	BRI; 37	ATL; 41	RCH; 41	CHI; 41	NHA; 32	DOV; 42	KAN; 40	CLT; 41	TAL; 30	MAR; 34	TEX; 39	PHO; 36	HOM; 41	39th	326
2013	Michael McDowell	35	Ford																						GLN; 38															39th	326
2014	Eric McClure	35	Ford	DAY; DNQ									TAL; DNQ	KAN	CLT	DOV	POC	MCH	SON	KEN	DAY	NHA	IND	POC	GLN	MCH	BRI	ATL	RCH	CHI	NHA	DOV	KAN	CLT	TAL	MAR	TEX	PHO	HOM	48th	44
2014	Blake Koch	35	Ford		PHO; 37	LVS; DNQ																																		48th	44
2014	David Reutimann	35	Ford				BRI; DNQ	CAL; 29	MAR; DNQ	TEX; 38	DAR; DNQ	RCH; 29																												48th	44
2015	Cole Whitt	35	Ford	DAY; 22	ATL; 37	LVS; 32	PHO; 25	CAL; 24	MAR; 22	TEX; 35	BRI; 27	RCH; 36	TAL; 13	KAN; 35	CLT; 28	DOV; 26	POC; 28	MCH; 32	SON; 22	DAY; 25	KEN; 37	NHA; 28	IND; 33	POC; 27	GLN; 21	MCH; 27	BRI; 29	DAR; 43	RCH; 38	CHI; 29	NHA; 24	DOV; 28	CLT; 38	KAN; 33	TAL; 22	MAR; 20	TEX; 27	PHO; 33	HOM; 28	31st	553
2016	David Gilliland	35	Ford	DAY; DNQ	ATL	LVS	PHO	CAL	MAR	TEX	BRI	RCH	TAL; 17	KAN	DOV	CLT	POC	MCH	SON	DAY; 19	KEN	NHA	IND	POC	GLN	BRI	MCH	DAR	RCH	CHI	NHA	DOV	CLT	KAN	TAL; DNQ	MAR	TEX	PHO	HOM	42nd	55

=== Car No. 36 history ===
J. J. Yeley (2018)

In August 2018, Front Row Motorsports was awarded the assets of BK Racing after making the highest bid at $2.8 million. They were awarded the No. 23 charter and most of the team's equipment. The team continued to use the No. 23 on the cars for the rest of the season with Joey Gase as the driver. Israeli driver Alon Day drove the car at Richmond. The fall race at Talladega was the first time the team fielded the No. 23 as a Ford Fusion, with J. J. Yeley (who previously driven for the same team in rest of 2011 season) driving it. The team had been running as a Toyota Camry up until then.

Matt Tifft (2019)

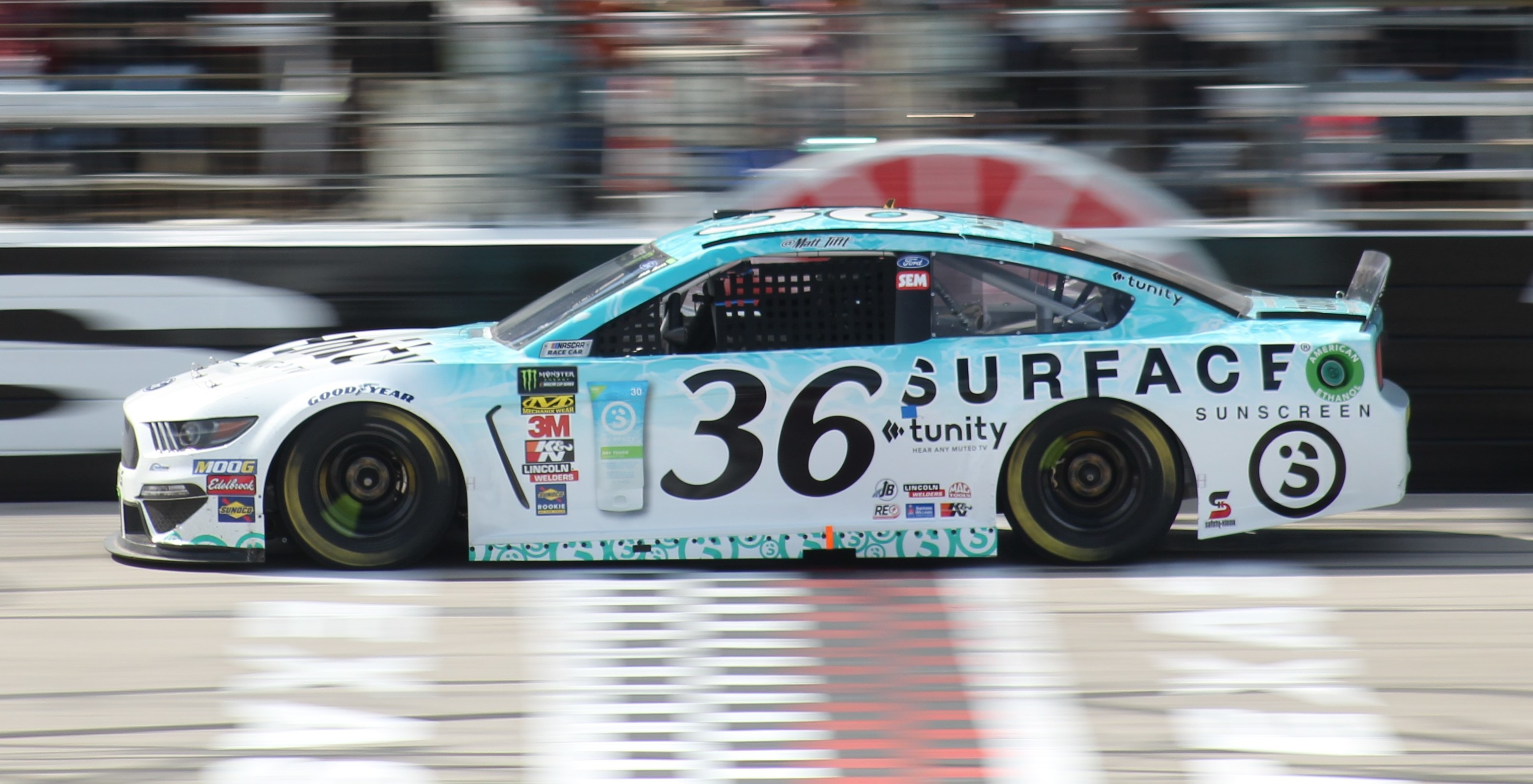
Matt Tifft in the No. 36 at Texas Motor Speedway in 2019.

On November 27, 2018, FRM announced that the team will be renumbered to 36, with Matt Tifft as the driver for the 2019 season and competing for 2019 Rookie of the Year honors. Tifft selected 36 as his racing number to honor his mentor Ken Schrader, who raced with that number in the Winston Cup Series from 2000 to 2002.

Before the Atlanta race, car chief Brandon Lee was ejected from the track after the No. 36 failed pre-qualifying inspection multiple times. On July 23, 2019, Front Row Motorsports announced that crew chief Mike Kelly of the No. 36 will switch to the No. 38 while Seth Barbour will transfer from the No. 38 to the No. 36 Ford for the remainder of the season. Prior to the Martinsville race, Tifft was rushed to the hospital while Matt Crafton took over the No. 36 for the race weekend. On October 29, Tifft revealed that he blacked out and suffered a seizure in the team's hauler. Because of this, he missed the rest of the season while John Hunter Nemechek took over the No. 36 for the final three races. Tifft formally parted ways with FRM before the end of the season to recover from his medical issues.

On December 12, 2019, FRM announced that the No. 36 team will shut down for the 2020 season, reverting to a two-car operation. The charter was leased to Rick Ware Racing, which used it for the No. 53 team until it was sold to Spire Motorsports at the end of the 2021 season. However, David Ragan ran the car as a No. 36 at the 2020 Daytona 500, finishing fourth.

David Ragan (2021)

On January 6, 2021, it was announced that the 36 would return for the 2021 Daytona 500 with Ragan behind the wheel. During the race, Ragan would be collected in a crash resulting in a 37th position.

Zane Smith, Todd Gilliland & Riley Herbst (2023)

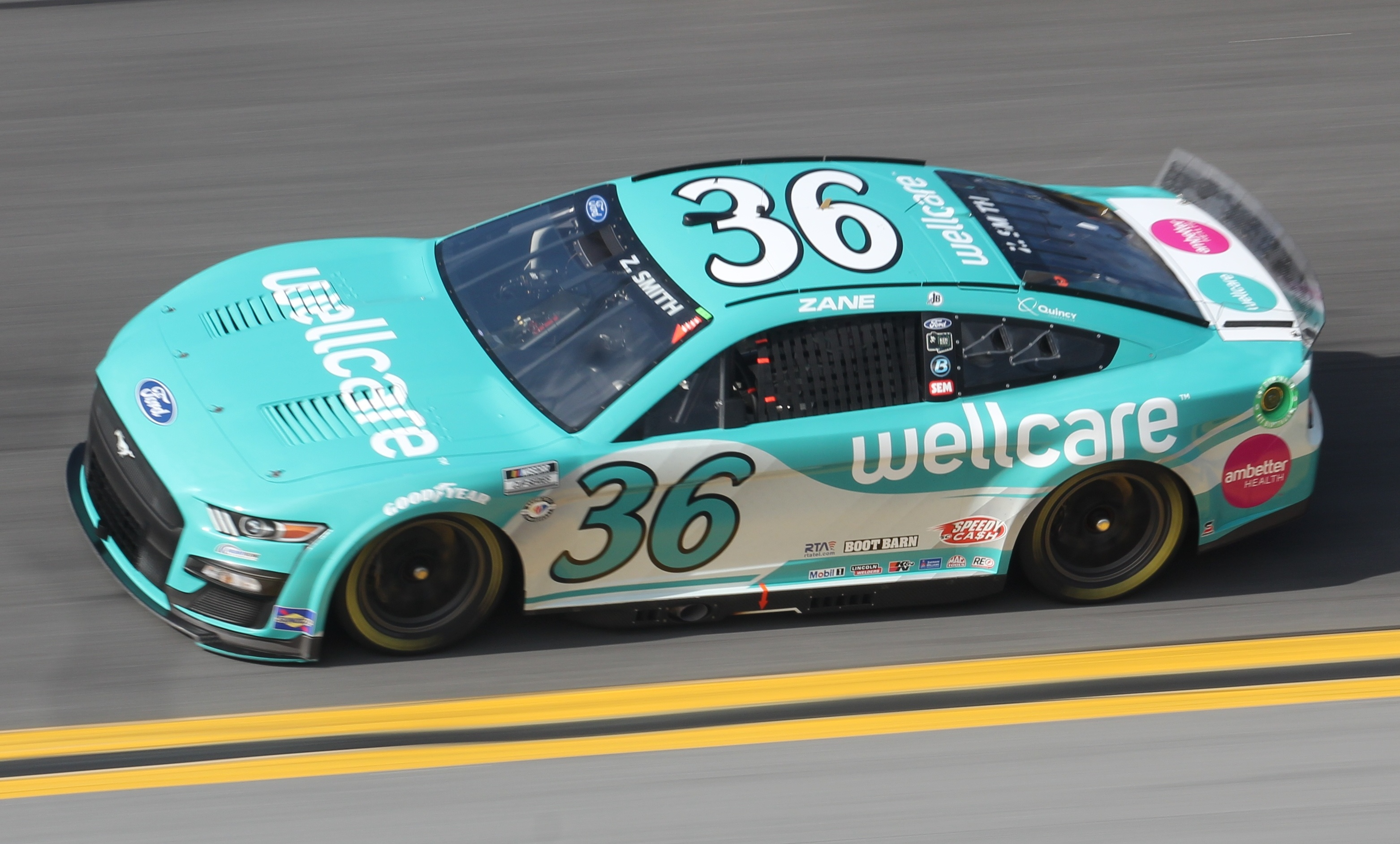
Zane Smith in the No. 36 at Daytona International Speedway in 2023.

On February 7, 2023, FRM announced Zane Smith would drive the No. 36 entry for the Daytona 500, as well as the No. 38 entry for six races replacing Todd Gilliland in those races. Subsequent to the announcement, Gilliland was announced to drive the No. 36 at the spring Talladega race (one of the races where Smith is scheduled to drive the No. 38) in order to maintain his eligibility for the NASCAR playoffs, with five of the six races for Rick Ware Racing instead. Riley Herbst would drive the No. 36 car at the 2023 Coke Zero Sugar 400 at Daytona. He started in sixth but fell to the back at the end of the first stage before getting caught up in the big one at the end of the second stage; he would be classified in 38th position. However, Herbst would finish ninth at the 2023 YellaWood 500 later that year after qualifying in sixth, down from a potential fourth after a final lap crash.

Kaz Grala (2024)

On January 23, 2024, it was announced Kaz Grala would attempt to qualify for the 2024 Daytona 500 in the No. 36.

Chandler Smith (2026)

On January 22, 2026, it was announced that Chandler Smith would attempt to make the Daytona 500, in the No. 36 Ford.

==== Car No. 36 results ====
Year	Driver	No.	Make	1	2	3	4	5	6	7	8	9	10	11	12	13	14	15	16	17	18	19	20	21	22	23	24	25	26	27	28	29	30	31	32	33	34	35	36	Owners	Pts
2019	Matt Tifft	36	Ford	DAY; 36	ATL; 28	LVS; 34	PHO; 20	CAL; 26	MAR; 29	TEX; 24	BRI; 27	RCH; 29	TAL; 37	DOV; 32	KAN; 21	CLT; 20	POC; 33	MCH; 24	SON; 28	CHI; 29	DAY; 9	KEN; 27	NHA; 24	POC; 23	GLN; 24	MCH; 25	BRI; 27	DAR; 27	IND; 32	LVS; 30	RCH; 20	CLT; 25	DOV; 25	TAL; 13	KAN; 25					29th	404
2019	Matt Crafton	36	Ford																																	MAR; 25				29th	404
2019	John Hunter Nemechek	36	Ford																																		TEX; 21	PHO; 27	HOM; 23	29th	404
2021	David Ragan	36	Ford	DAY; 37	DAY	HOM	LVS	PHO	ATL	BRI	MAR	RCH	TAL	KAN	DAR	DOV	COA	CLT	SON	NSH	POC	POC	ROA	ATL	NHA	GLN	IND	MCH	DAY	DAR	RCH	BRI	LVS	TAL	CLT	TEX	KAN	MAR	PHO	43rd	4
2023	Zane Smith	36	Ford	DAY; 13	CAL	LVS	PHO	ATL	COA	RCH	BRD	MAR																												38th	83
2023	Todd Gilliland	36	Ford										TAL; 10	DOV	KAN	DAR	CLT	GTW	SON	NSH	CSC	ATL	NHA	POC	RCH	MCH	IRC	GLN												38th	83
2023	Riley Herbst	36	Ford																										DAY; 38	DAR	KAN	BRI	TEX	TAL; 9	ROV	LVS	HOM	MAR	PHO	38th	83
2024	Kaz Grala	36	Ford	DAY; 38	ATL	LVS	PHO	BRI	COA	RCH	MAR	TEX	TAL	DOV	KAN	DAR	CLT	GTW	SON	IOW	NHA	NSH	CSC	POC	IND	RCH	MCH	DAY	DAR	ATL	GLN	BRI	KAN	TAL	ROV	LVS	HOM	MAR	PHO	47th	1
2026	Chandler Smith	36	Ford	DAY; DNQ	ATL	COA	PHO	LVS	DAR	MAR	BRI	KAN	TAL	TEX	GLN	CLT	NSH	MCH	POC	COR	SON	CHI	ATL	NWS	IND	IOW	RCH	NHA	DAY	DAR	GTW	BRI	KAN	LVS	CLT	PHO	TAL	MAR	HOM		

=== Car No. 37 history ===
Multiple drivers (2007–2009)

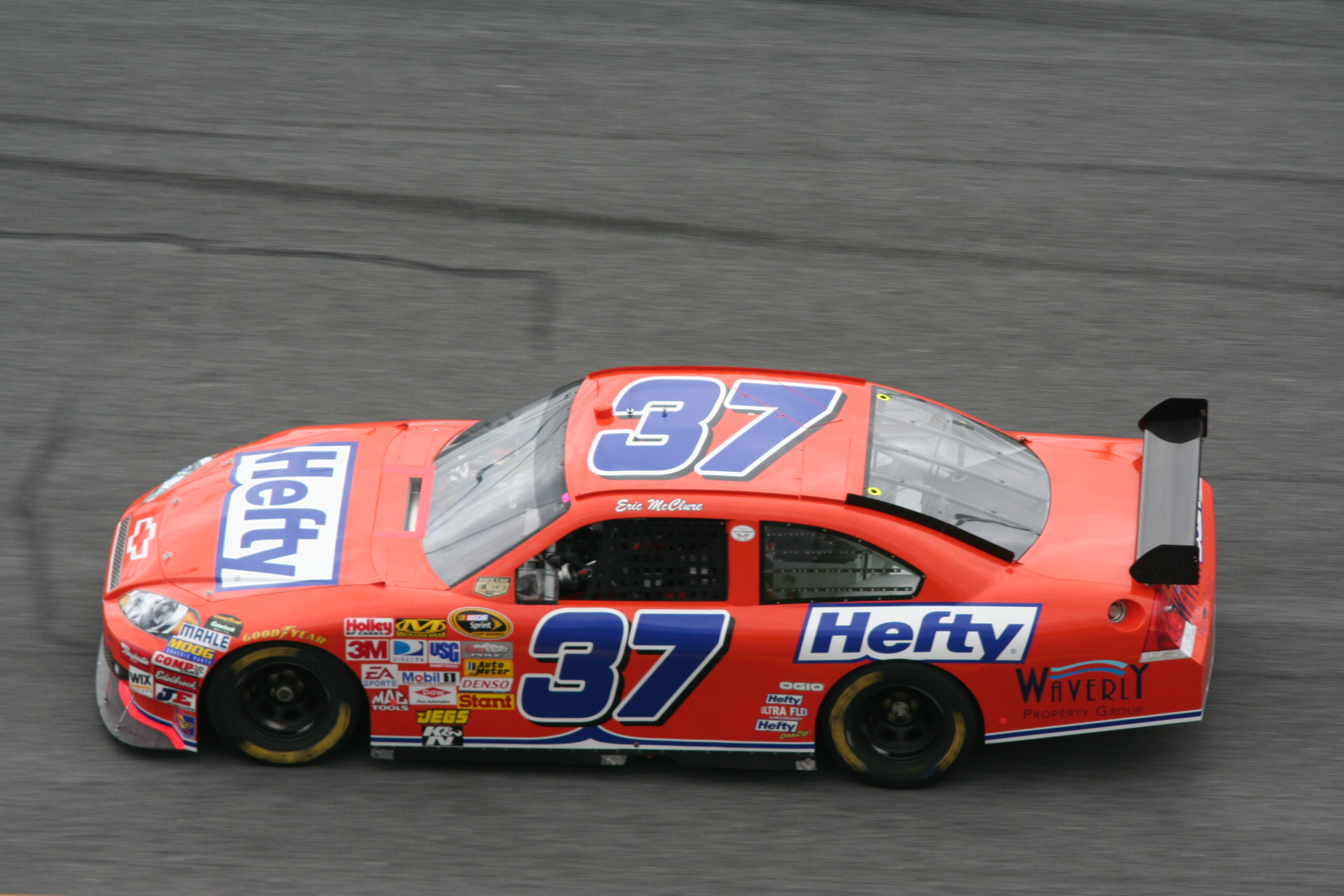
Eric McClure in the No. 37 at Daytona in 2008.

The team partnered with No. 37 of R&J Racing in 2007, however, the deal fell through early in the season, although Front Row retained the team's owner's points and car number. Bill Elliott attempted Daytona for the team and John Andretti and Chad Chaffin planned to race the car full-time. After race 4, Front Row Motorsports announced the No. 34 would run full-time, and that Andretti and Chaffin would swap positions with Lepage so that Lepage could continue full-time. Lepage failed to qualify twenty-five times and left before the end of the season. The 37 attempted the 2008 Daytona 500 with Eric McClure and sponsor Hefty, but the team failed to qualify.

The team returned to the track for the 2009 Daytona 500 with Tony Raines driving, inheriting the points from the No. 34 from the year before as a result of the merger with EGR, but did not qualify. The team has attempted other races since then, making the race at Richmond, and finished the race in 41st only after running 74 laps. They were awarded no points for the race because of being a late entry. The team also made Dover, however a flat tire early in the race ended the team's run and they finished 42nd. Kevin Hamlin attempted to make his Sprint Cup debut in the No. 37 at Kansas, however, did not qualify for the race. Travis Kvapil DNQ'd at Lowes Motor Speedway. The No. 37 was mostly a start and park entry in 2009, although the team ran the full race at Daytona with Tony Raines when they picked up sponsorship from Gander Mountain, and also Homestead with Travis Kvapil when Miccosukee Indian Gaming & Resort sponsored the team after David Stremme failed to qualify in the Phoenix Racing entry. Scott Eggleston crew-chiefed the car for the majority of 2009, with Buddy Sisco acting as chief during the Coke Zero 400 and Peter Sospenzo joining the team during the second half of the season. Road course ringer Tony Ave drove the #37 Long John Silver's car at Watkins Glen, placing 43rd after blowing an engine on lap 8.

Kevin Conway (2010)

For the 2010 season, the No. 37 became a full-time Ford team and rookie Kevin Conway was scheduled to drive the No. 37, with his longtime sponsor Extenze coming on board, with Peter Sospenzo as Crew Chief. The team started in the Top 35 after acquiring owner's points from former Doug Yates cars. Kvapil drove the No. 37 in the 2010 Daytona 500, as NASCAR did not give Conway approval to compete at Daytona due to a lack of superspeedway experience. Conway was unable to keep the car in the top-35 in points, so he, his sponsor, and crew (which is referred to as the Extenze/ A&W crew) would jump to whatever number was highest in points at the time to ensure he and his sponsor would qualify. Conway would eventually be released from FRM, ExtenZe removed from the car, he and his sponsor sued for lack of payment and was replaced with a rotation of NASCAR veterans Tony Raines and Dave Blaney. A&W All American Food would be displayed on the car in ExtenZe's absence, another Jenkins franchise. Peter Sospenzo & his crew remained with the A&W car until Atlanta in September, when Sospenzo and his crew moved over to the Taco Bell car of David Gilliland. Randy Seals and the former Taco Bell crew moved over to the A&W team. The No. 37 car would wind up 33rd in owners points, with Conway having a best finish of 14th at Daytona (one of only four finishes better than 30th for him), Blaney having a best finish of 24th at Atlanta, and Raines with a best finish of 28th at Bristol (he was running top-20 at Martinsville before a flat tire ended his day). Gilliland also ran the number occasionally with his Taco Bell crew.

Max Q Motorsports (2011)

For 2011, Robert Richardson Jr. returned to drive the Daytona 500 in the No. 37 with his father's company, North Texas Pipe, sponsoring the ride. Driver Tony Raines spotted him during the race. After Daytona, FRM struck a deal with Larry Gunselman's Max Q Motorsports to manage the No. 37 for the remainder of the year. Gunselman later purchased all assets of the team and FRM is no longer involved in the No. 37.

==== Car No. 37 results ====
Year	Driver	No.	Make	1	2	3	4	5	6	7	8	9	10	11	12	13	14	15	16	17	18	19	20	21	22	23	24	25	26	27	28	29	30	31	32	33	34	35	36	Owners	Pts
2007	Bill Elliott	37	Dodge	DAY; DNQ																																				49th	683
2007	John Andretti	37	Dodge		CAL; 34	LVS; DNQ	ATL; DNQ			TEX; DNQ	PHO; DNQ	TAL; DNQ																												49th	683
2007	Kevin Lepage	37	Dodge					BRI; DNQ	MAR; DNQ				RCH; DNQ	DAR; 42	CLT; DNQ	DOV; DNQ	POC; DNQ	MCH; DNQ		NHA; 35	DAY; DNQ	CHI; DNQ	IND; DNQ	POC; DNQ		MCH; DNQ	BRI; DNQ	CAL	RCH; DNQ	NHA; DNQ	DOV; DNQ	KAN	TAL; DNQ	CLT	MAR; DNQ	ATL	TEX	PHO	HOM	49th	683
2007	Brian Simo	37	Dodge																SON; DNQ						GLN; DNQ															49th	683
2008	Eric McClure	37	Chevy	DAY; DNQ	CAL	LVS	ATL	BRI	MAR	TEX	PHO	TAL	RCH	DAR	CLT	DOV	POC	MCH	SON	NHA	DAY	CHI	IND	POC	GLN	MCH	BRI	CAL	RCH	NHA	DOV	KAN	TAL	CLT	MAR	ATL	TEX	PHO	HOM	62nd	16
2009	Tony Raines	37	Dodge	DAY; DNQ	CAL; DNQ	LVS; DNQ	ATL	BRI										MCH; 43		NHA; 41	DAY; 30			POC; 42		MCH; DNQ	BRI; 42	ATL; DNQ	RCH; DNQ	NHA; 43	DOV; 43		CAL; DNQ							45th	814
2009	Tony Raines	37	Chevy						MAR; DNQ	TEX	PHO	TAL	RCH; 41	DAR	CLT	DOV; 42	POC; DNQ					CHI; DNQ	IND														TEX; DNQ	PHO; 43		45th	814
2009	Chris Cook	37	Dodge																SON; DNQ																					45th	814
2009	Tony Ave	37	Dodge																						GLN; 43															45th	814
2009	Kevin Hamlin	37	Dodge																													KAN; DNQ								45th	814
2009	Travis Kvapil	37	Dodge																															CLT; DNQ	MAR; 43	TAL				45th	814
2009	Travis Kvapil	37	Chevy																																				HOM; 37	45th	814
2010	Travis Kvapil	37	Ford	DAY; 29															SON; 24				IND; 24		GLN; 30															33rd	2579
2010	Kevin Conway	37	Ford		CAL; 31	LVS; 36	ATL; 31	BRI; 28						DAR; 33	DOV; 30																									33rd	2579
2010	David Gilliland	37	Ford						MAR; 19	PHO; 32	TEX; 29		RCH; 31			CLT; 26	POC; 33	MCH; 35		NHA; 35		CHI; 32		POC; 30		MCH; 36		ATL; 20	RCH; 37	NHA; 33		KAN; 32			MAR; 37	TAL; 33		PHO; 38	HOM; 25	33rd	2579
2010	Robert Richardson Jr.	37	Ford									TAL; 26									DAY; 23																			33rd	2579
2010	Tony Raines	37	Ford																								BRI; 28				DOV; 31									33rd	2579
2010	Dave Blaney	37	Ford																														CAL; 29	CLT; 32			TEX; 42			33rd	2579
2011	Robert Richardson Jr.	37	Ford	DAY; 38	PHO	LVS	BRI	CAL	MAR	TEX	TAL	RCH	DAR	DOV	CLT	KAN	POC	MCH	SON	DAY	KEN	NHA	IND	POC	GLN	MCH	BRI	ATL	RCH	CHI	NHA	DOV	KAN	CLT	TAL	MAR	TEX	PHO	HOM	39th	186

=== Car No. 38 history ===
David Gilliland (2010)

Front Row Motorsports added a third team in 2010, with David Gilliland as the primary driver and Robert Richardson, Jr. sharing the ride for at least 3 races throughout the year. Randy Seals came from Richard Petty Motorsports as crew chief. Richardson ran the 2010 Daytona 500 with sponsorship from Mahindra Tractors, with Gilliland displaying Taco Bell for the other races. The team allied with Doug Yates in February 2010 and earned Top 35 exemptions for the first five races of 2010 from a former Yates Racing entry. Gilliland and his Randy Seals lead Taco Bell crew swapped between the No. 38 and No. 37 throughout the season. Kevin Conway and Dave Blaney ran races under No. 38 with the ExtenZe/A&W crew and Kvapil ran races with the No. 38 and his LJS's crew. At Pocono in August, with Kvapil and his then crew chief Steven Lane in the No. 38, it was determined the car had an illegal valve stem in one of the tires, resulting in a 150-point deduction for the No. 38 car, the suspension & fining of crew chief Steven Lane, suspension of car chief Richard Bourgeois and tire specialist Michael Harrold. Steven Lane was released from the team soon thereafter and replaced by Brian Burns on the LJS's team. The team never regained top-35 status, missing races and finishing 36th in points. Gilliland and his Taco Bell crew had a best finish of 19th twice, at Martinsville and Sonoma.

Travis Kvapil (2011)

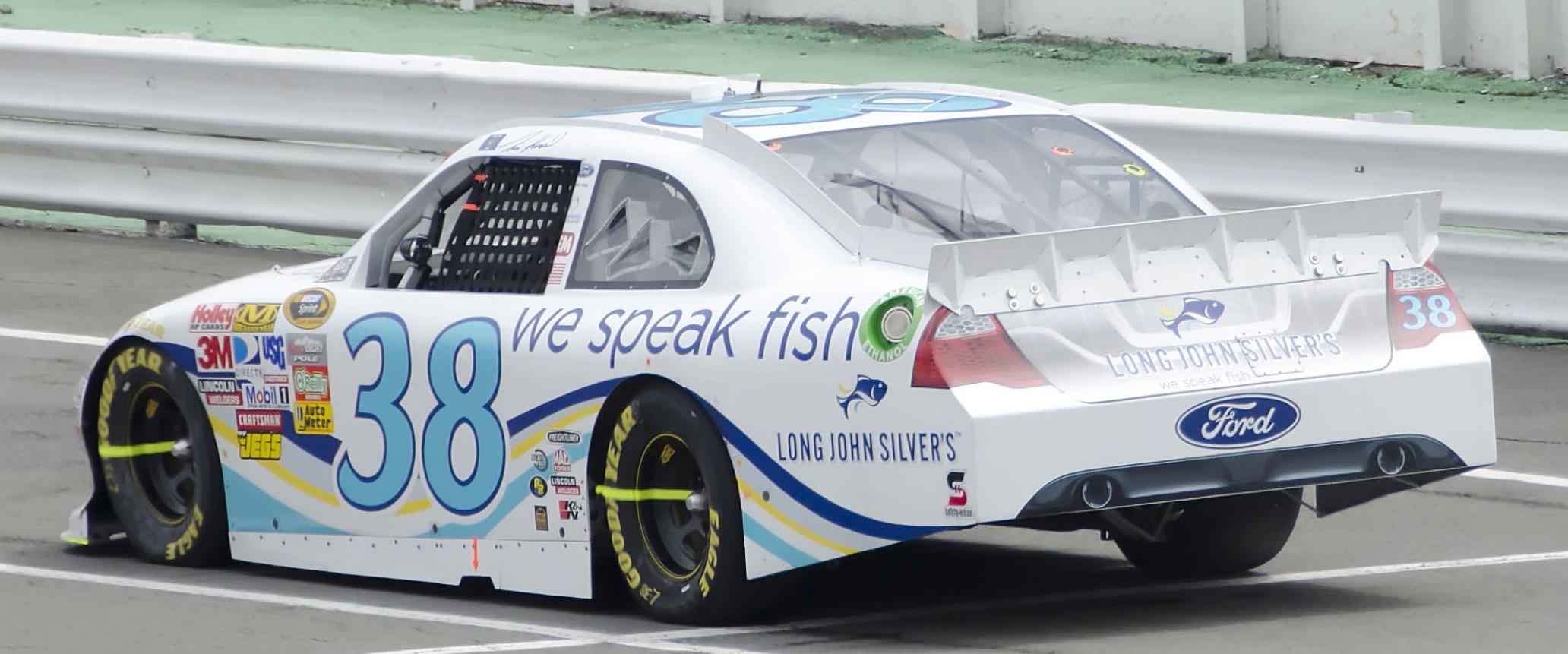
Travis Kvapil in the No. 38 at Pocono Raceway in 2011.

For 2011, Travis Kvapil returned to FRM to drive the No. 38 Long John Silver's Ford, however, Kvapil opted to run for the Camping World Truck Series championship. The No. 38 was locked into the field following Daytona, as Penske Racing's/Rusty Wallace Racing's No. 77 did not run past Daytona and in turn, gave up its locked-in spot to the No. 38. Bill Henderson joined FRM as crew chief of the No. 38 following a stint at Prism Motorsports in 2010, however parted ways with the team following the race at Las Vegas. Jay Guy joined as crew chief at California.

Kvapil missed two races due to Truck Series obligations, and after the debut of the No. 55 car and the signing of J. J. Yeley, the two drivers split time in both the No. 38 and No. 55 cars for the duration of the season.

David Gilliland (2012–2015)

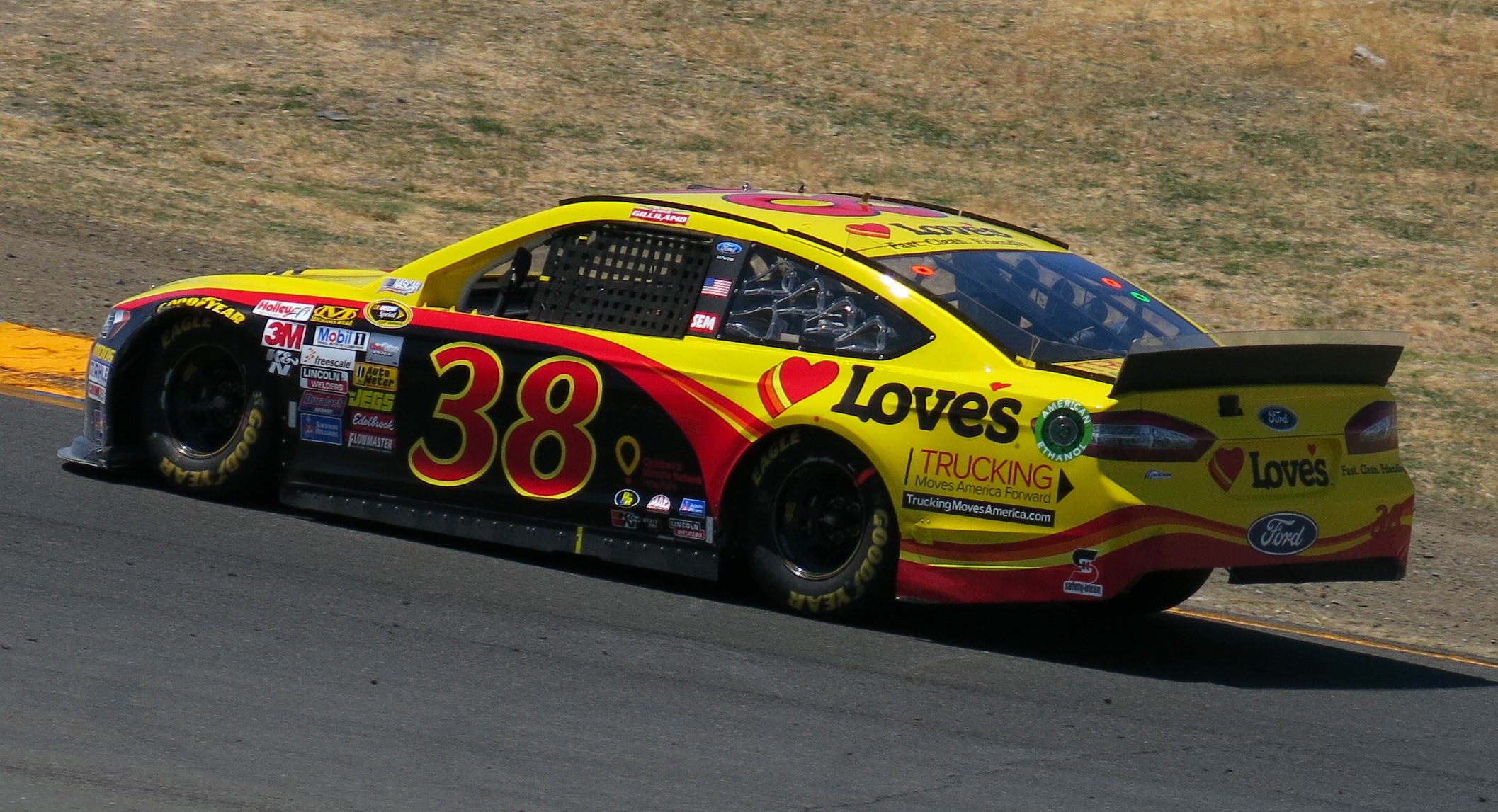
David Gilliland in the No. 38 at Sonoma Raceway in 2014.

For 2012, David Gilliland returned to the No. 38, after driving the team's No. 34 in 2011. The team had also signed ModSpace / United Rentals to a multi-race primary sponsorship of the No. 38 beginning at Texas in April. Pat Tryson was the No. 38's crew chief. The team has also signed Maximum Human Performance to a multi-race sponsorship beginning with the Daytona 500. FRM would have a variety of other sponsors throughout the season. Gilliland would end up 28th in points.

In 2013, David Gilliland continued driving the No. 38 full-time for FRM. In the 2013 Aaron's 499, Gilliland pushed teammate Ragan to the checked flag, producing a 1-2 finish for Front Row. Gilliland went on to record two top-tens on the season and finish 26th in points.

In 2014, Gilliland returned to the No. 38. Love's Travel Stops stepped up their sponsorship of the team to 12 races. The team started the season slowly and struggled, especially at the intermediate tracks. The No. 38 team would rebound and Gilliland won the pole at the summer Daytona race, the first pole for FRM.

Gilliland returned to the No. 38 for 2015, with Love's Travel Stops further stepping up their sponsorship to 18 races. Gilliland began the season by finishing 11th in the Daytona 500. The No. 38 also picked up sponsorship from Farm Rich during Talladega (a sponsor of FRM's No. 34 car). After an up and down season, Gilliland was released from the team after six years.

Landon Cassill (2016)

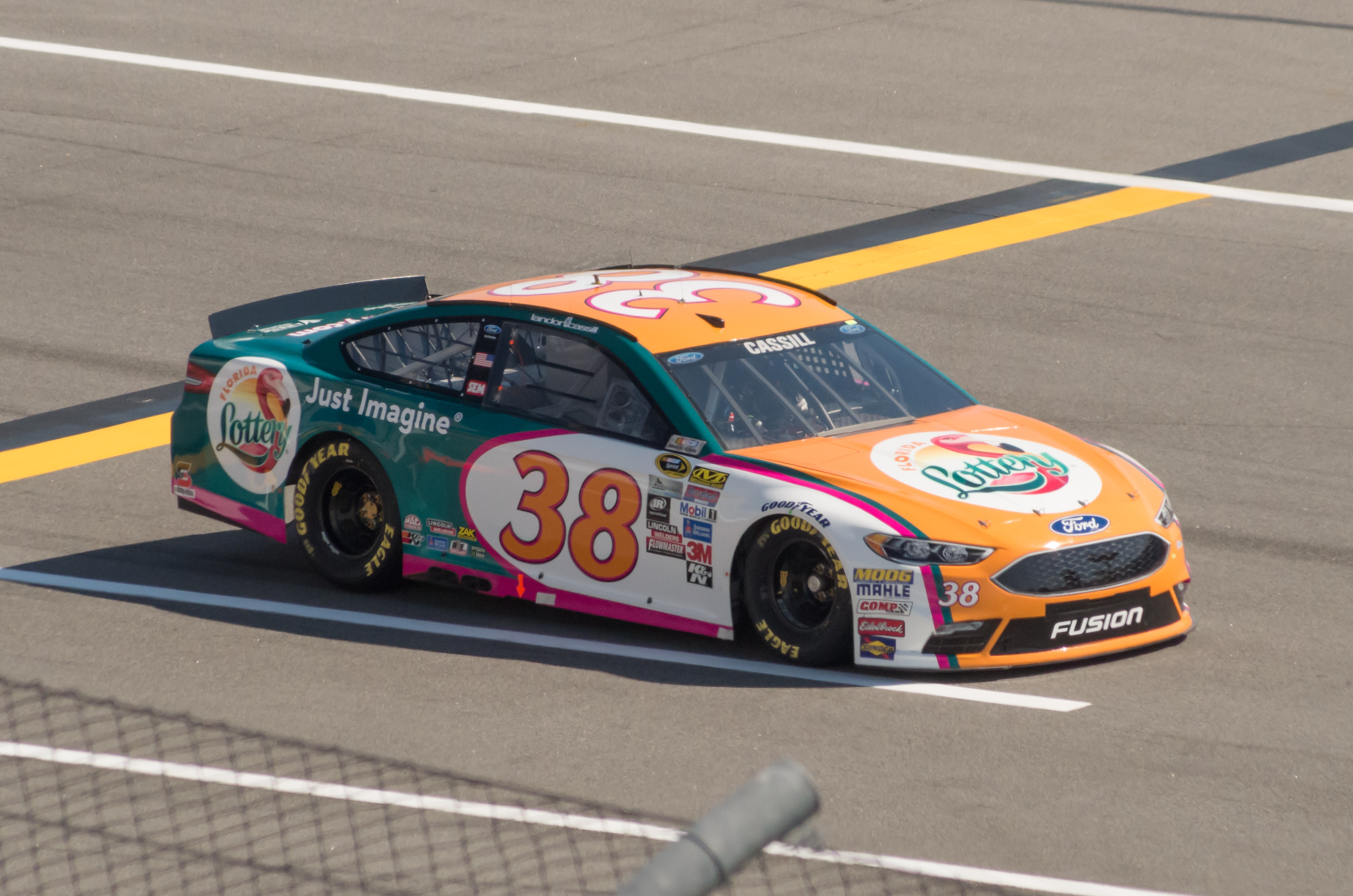
Landon Cassill at Daytona International Speedway in 2016

In 2016, FRM announced an alliance with Roush-Fenway Racing. On January 20, 2016, it was announced that FRM signed Landon Cassill full-time driving the No. 38 Ford, bringing his sponsor Snap Fitness for a few races as well as Florida Lottery. Cassill ended the season finishing 29th in points.

David Ragan (2017–2019)

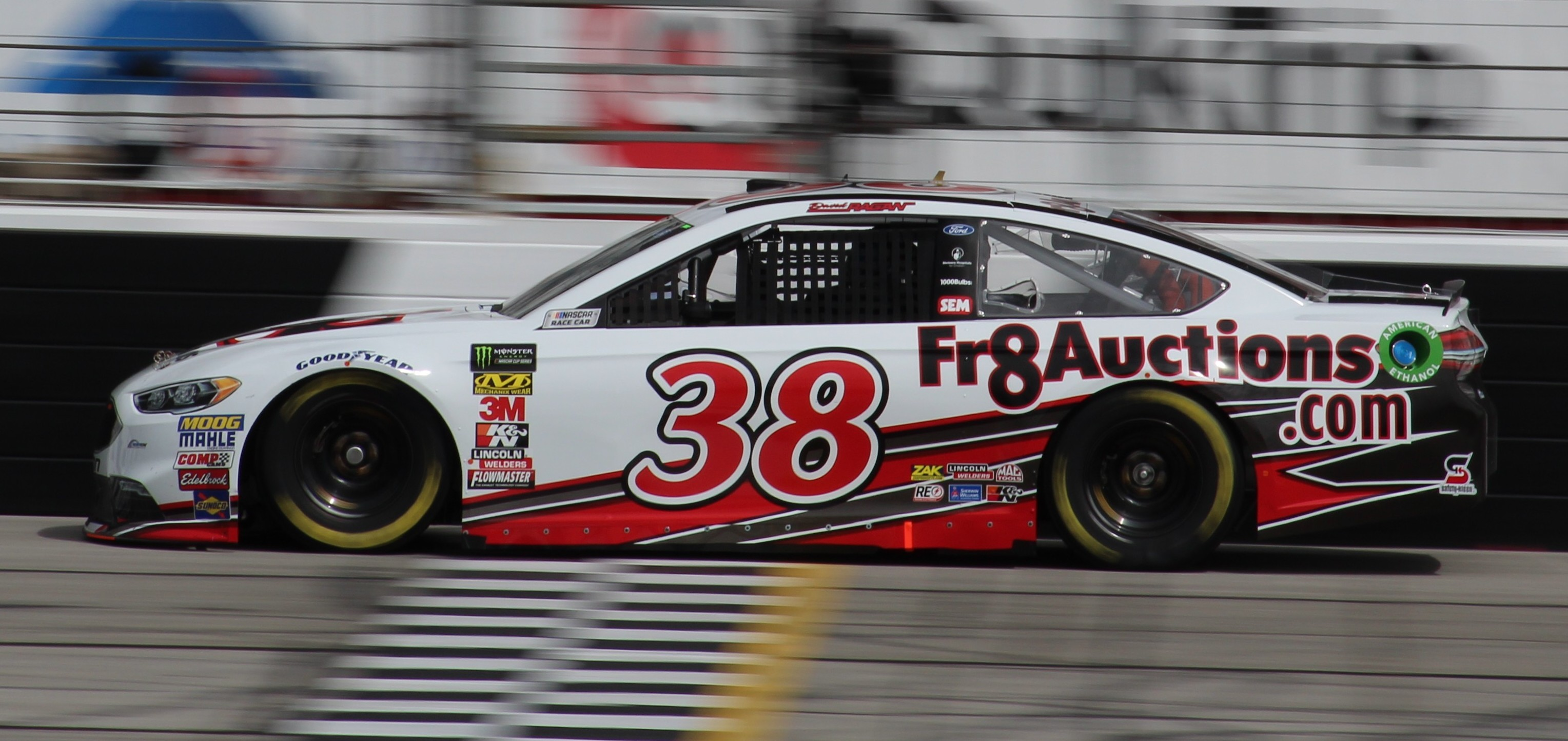
David Ragan in the No. 38 at Atlanta Motor Speedway in 2018.

On December 16, 2016, it was announced that Cassill would shift to the newly open No. 34 car and that David Ragan would rejoin FRM to drive the No. 38. Prior to the 2017 Daytona 500, Ragan acquired sponsorship from Camping World and Jacob Companies. Ragan ended 2017 with three top-tens and a thirtieth-place points finish.

Ragan improved vastly in 2018. While he only scored one top-ten finish, at Talladega Superspeedway in the spring, he posted sixteen top-twentiess, including four in the last five races of the season, and finished a team-best 25th in the final points standings.

Ragan returned to the team in 2019. On July 23, 2019, Front Row Motorsports announced that crew chief Mike Kelly of the No. 36 would switch to the No. 38 while Seth Barbour will transfer from the No. 38 to the No. 36 Ford for the remainder of the season. Ragan retired from full-time competition at the end of the 2019 season.

John Hunter Nemechek (2020)

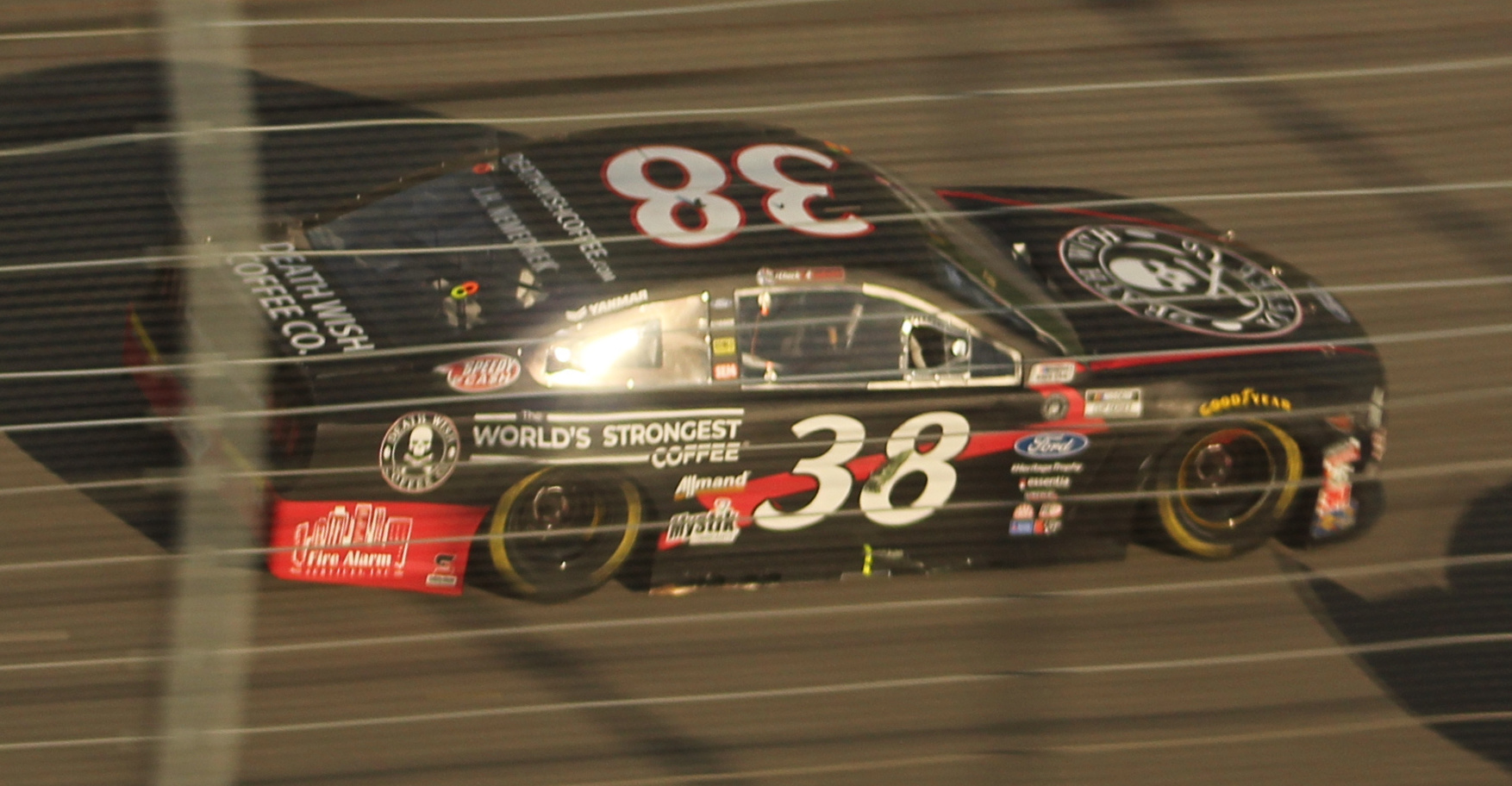
John Hunter Nemechek in the No. 38 at Michigan International Speedway in 2020.

On December 12, 2019, FRM announced that John Hunter Nemechek will replace Ragan as the driver of the No. 38 Ford for the 2020 season and will compete for the 2020 NASCAR Rookie of the Year honors. In addition, Barbour will return as the team's crew chief. Nemechek was the highest-finishing rookie at the Daytona 500, coming home fourteenth and scoring three top-tens, including two eighth place finishes at both Talladega races. However, inconsistency plagued the team and he ended the season 27th in points.

On November 16, 2020, Nemechek parted ways with FRM.

Anthony Alfredo (2021)

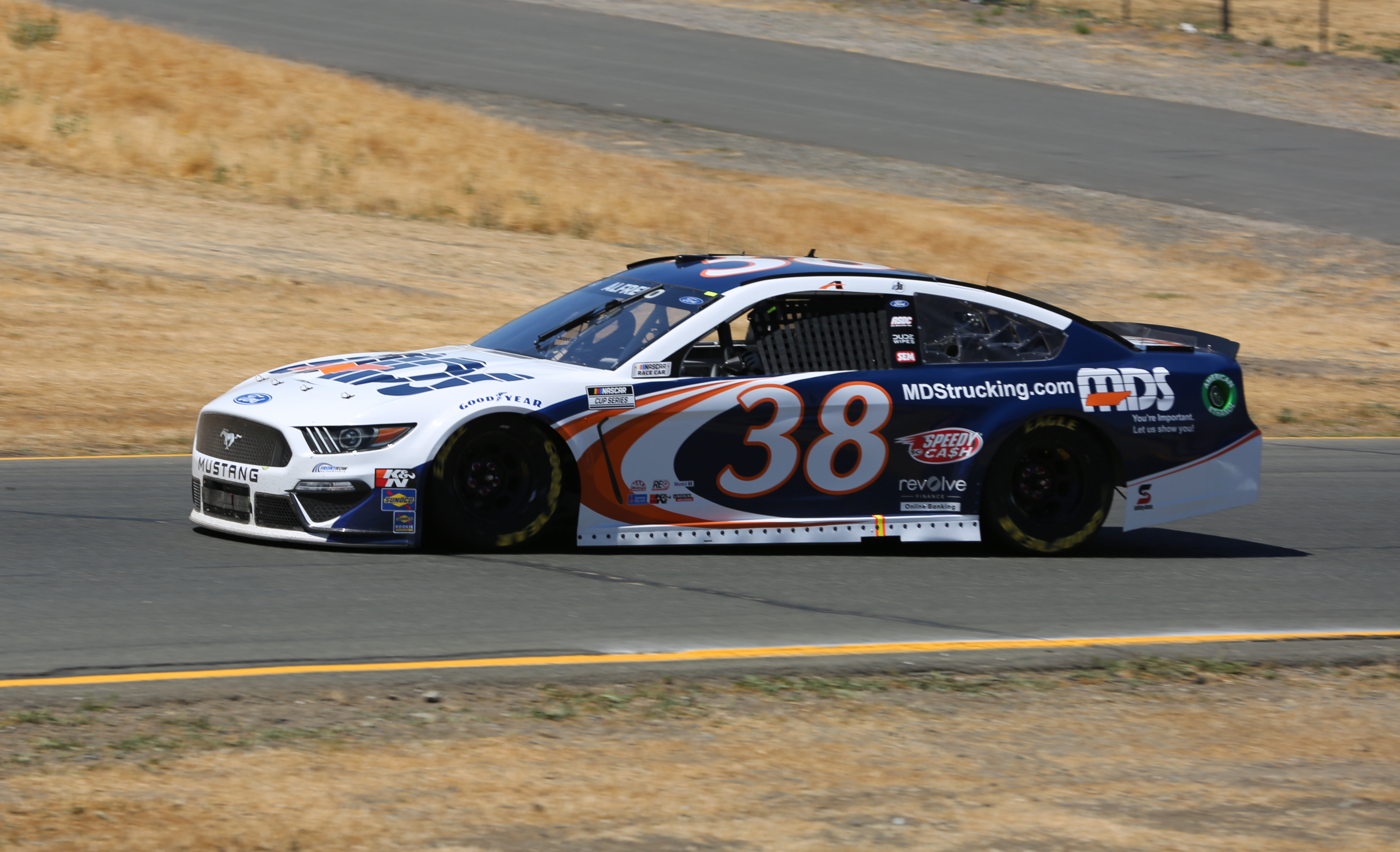
Anthony Alfredo in the No. 38 at Sonoma Raceway in 2021.

On January 6, 2021, it was announced that Anthony Alfredo would replace John Hunter Nemechek as the driver of the No. 38 Ford for the 2021 season and will compete for NASCAR Rookie of the Year honors. He finished 30th in the final standings with just one top-ten finish. On November 9, Alfredo parted ways with FRM.

Todd Gilliland (2022–2024)

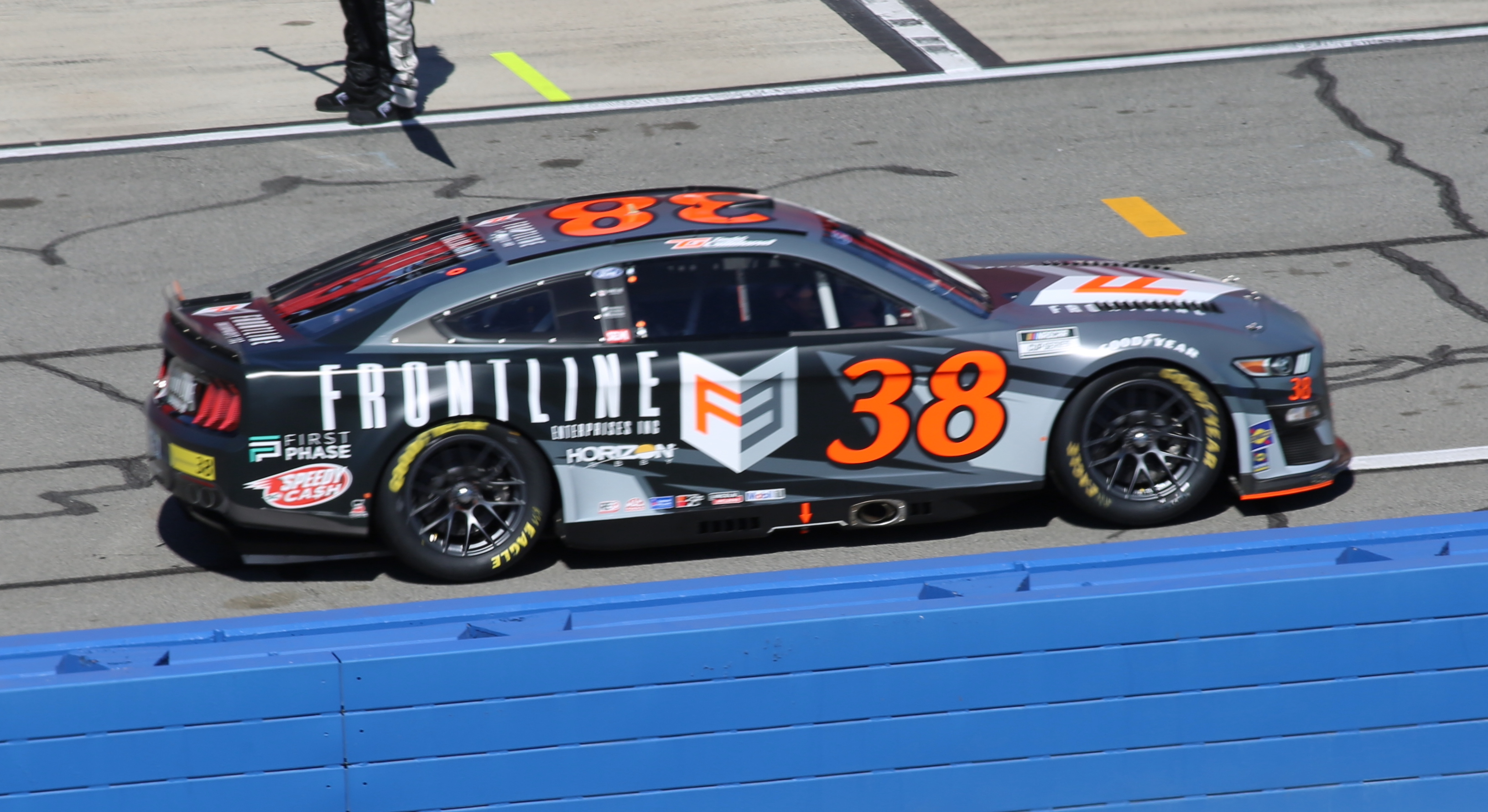
Todd Gilliland in the No. 38 at Auto Club Speedway in 2022

On November 30, 2021, it was announced that FRM truck series driver Todd Gilliland would replace Alfredo as the driver of the No. 38 Ford for the 2022 season and will compete for Rookie of the Year honors. On March 1, 2022, Barbour was suspended for four races due to a tire and wheel loss during the 2022 WISE Power 400 at Auto Club Speedway.

On February 7, 2023, FRM announced that Zane Smith would run five races in the No. 38 Ford in addition to qualifying for the Daytona 500 in the No. 36.

On August 9, it was announced that Gilliland would return to Front Row Motorsports in the No. 38 in 2024, which would mark his third season in the NASCAR Cup Series. Gilliland's early season performances showed improvement to the previous two years, as he led a then career-high sixteen laps at the Daytona 500 prior to being collected in a late-race incident, before surpassing that stat by leading the most laps at Atlanta with 58, though he would fall out of win contention late on with a broken toe link. During a run of nine consecutive Top 20 finishes in late spring and early summer, Gilliland signed a multi-year extension with Front Row. With four top-ten finishes and an average finish of 20.9, Gilliland finished 22nd in the standings.

Zane Smith (2025–present)

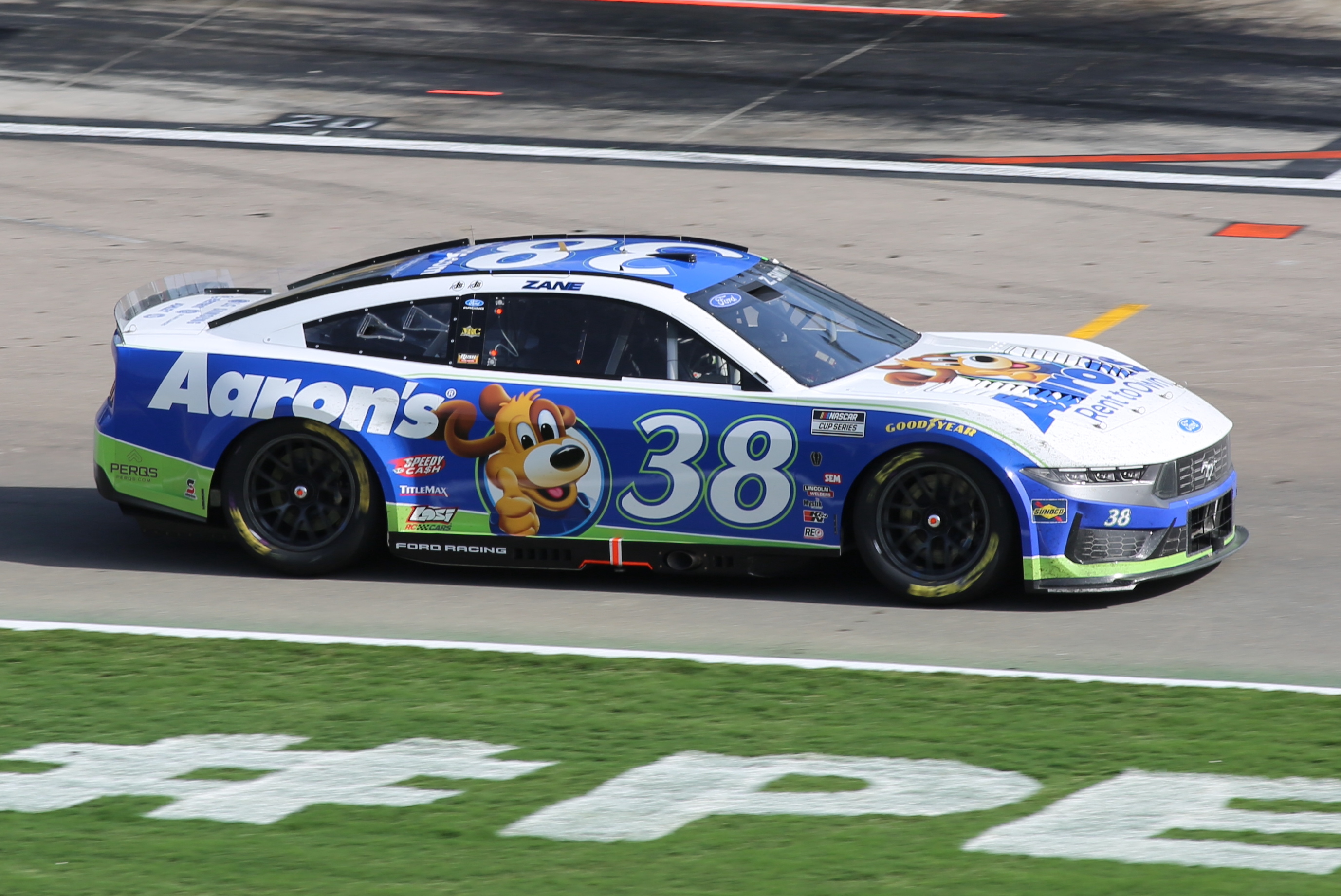
Smith's No. 38 car at Las Vegas Motor Speedway in 2026

On January 2, 2025, FRM announced that Zane Smith would run in the No. 38 car full-time. Smith began the season with a 36th-place DNF at the Daytona 500. Smith would earn his first career Cup Series pole at Talladega in the spring and scored 3 top 10 finishes, but missed the playoffs after finishing 28th in regular season points. During the Hollywood Casino 400 at Kansas Speedway in the fall, Smith's car overturned in an incident with John Hunter Nemechek during an overtime attempt. Entering turn 3, Nemechek overdrove the corner and slid up from the middle lane, colliding with Smith, who was on his outside. Smith's car was squeezed into the outside wall, which lifted the passenger side off the ground as the car grinded along the wall on its driver's side. The car slid with the floor in contact with the wall for several hundred yards before overturning fully and barrel rolling on the lower banking on the exit of turn 4 before landing upright. Smith exited under his own power uninjured.

Smith started the 2026 season with a 6th-place finish at the 2026 Daytona 500.

==== Car No. 38 results ====
Year	Driver	No.	Make	1	2	3	4	5	6	7	8	9	10	11	12	13	14	15	16	17	18	19	20	21	22	23	24	25	26	27	28	29	30	31	32	33	34	35	36	Owners	Pts
2010	Robert Richardson Jr.	38	Ford	DAY; 31																																				36th	2454
2010	David Gilliland	38	Ford		CAL; 26	LVS; 30	ATL; 26	BRI; 23						DAR; 35	DOV; 25				SON; 19				IND; DNQ		GLN; 27		BRI; 26				DOV; 30		CAL; 20	CLT; 28			TEX; 29			36th	2454
2010	Kevin Conway	38	Ford						MAR; 31	PHO; 33	TEX; 27	TAL; 30	RCH; 37																											36th	2454
2010	Travis Kvapil	38	Ford													CLT; 28	POC; 22	MCH; 31			DAY; 34	CHI; 31		POC; 29		MCH; 30			RCH; 35	NHA; 32					MAR; 35	TAL; DNQ		PHO; 34		36th	2454
2010	Dave Blaney	38	Ford																									ATL; 24				KAN; 31							HOM; 36	36th	2454
2011	Travis Kvapil	38	Ford	DAY; 32	PHO; 39	LVS; 33	BRI; 26	CAL; 35	MAR; 37	TEX; DNQ	TAL; 29	RCH; 30	DAR; 26	DOV; 31	CLT; 25	KAN; 34		MCH; 31		DAY; 29	KEN; 29		IND; DNQ	POC; 31		MCH; 28	BRI; 37		RCH; 28				KAN; 27		TAL; 21	MAR; 16	TEX; 31		HOM; 22	35th	494
2011	Sam Hornish Jr.	38	Ford														POC; 35																							35th	494
2011	Tony Ave	38	Ford																SON; DNQ																					35th	494
2011	J. J. Yeley	38	Ford																			NHA; 23						ATL; 25		CHI; 34	NHA; 27	DOV; 34		CLT; 22				PHO; 28		35th	494
2011	Terry Labonte	38	Ford																						GLN; 34															35th	494
2012	David Gilliland	38	Ford	DAY; 23	PHO; 28	LVS; 33	BRI; 26	CAL; 30	MAR; 28	TEX; 31	KAN; 27	RCH; 36	TAL; 13	DAR; 25	CLT; 26	DOV; 40	POC; 23	MCH; 27	SON; 26	KEN; 28	DAY; 31	NHA; 27	IND; 27	POC; 21	GLN; 20	MCH; 18	BRI; 20	ATL; 31	RCH; 31	CHI; 28	NHA; 32	DOV; 32	TAL; 15	CLT; 23	KAN; 23	MAR; 30	TEX; 35	PHO; 36	HOM; 33	31st	605
2013	David Gilliland	38	Ford	DAY; 38	PHO; 37	LVS; 28	BRI; 24	CAL; 29	MAR; 28	TEX; 32	KAN; 23	RCH; 27	TAL; 2	DAR; 29	CLT; 20	DOV; 37	POC; 24	MCH; 22	SON; 24	KEN; 28	DAY; 15	NHA; 18	IND; 35	POC; 39	GLN; 25	MCH; 37	BRI; 25	ATL; 17	RCH; 23	CHI; 28	NHA; 39	DOV; 30	KAN; 24	CLT; 29	TAL; 7	MAR; 23	TEX; 26	PHO; 24	HOM; 27	27th	648
2014	David Gilliland	38	Ford	DAY; 36	PHO; 39	LVS; 30	BRI; 22	CAL; 38	MAR; 26	TEX; 22	DAR; 28	RCH; 20	TAL; 40	KAN; 37	CLT; 43	DOV; 29	POC; 28	MCH; 26	SON; 21	KEN; 30	DAY; 35	NHA; 24	IND; 36	POC; 17	GLN; 22	MCH; 21	BRI; 25	ATL; 28	RCH; 29	CHI; 34	NHA; 27	DOV; 33	KAN; 30	CLT; 32	TAL; 29	MAR; 22	TEX; 34	PHO; 24	HOM; 31	30th	554
2015	David Gilliland	38	Ford	DAY; 11	ATL; 22	LVS; 23	PHO; 29	CAL; 35	MAR; 25	TEX; 28	BRI; 18	RCH; 31	TAL; 20	KAN; 32	CLT; 33	DOV; 25	POC; 27	MCH; 42	SON; 43	DAY; 40	KEN; 29	NHA; 21	IND; 29	POC; 33	GLN; 33	MCH; 32	BRI; 36	DAR; 27	RCH; 33	CHI; 32	NHA; 28	DOV; 30	CLT; 27	KAN; 36	TAL; 32	MAR; 24	TEX; 29	PHO; 30	HOM; 32	32nd	533
2016	Landon Cassill	38	Ford	DAY; 23	ATL; 36	LVS; 28	PHO; 25	CAL; 16	MAR; 28	TEX; 25	BRI; 22	RCH; 27	TAL; 11	KAN; 31	DOV; 19	CLT; 27	POC; 36	MCH; 25	SON; 29	DAY; 31	KEN; 29	NHA; 28	IND; 20	POC; 30	GLN; 23	BRI; 20	MCH; 39	DAR; 30	RCH; 36	CHI; 29	NHA; 29	DOV; 29	CLT; 19	KAN; 27	TAL; 21	MAR; 29	TEX; 29	PHO; 20	HOM; 21	31st	530
2017	David Ragan	38	Ford	DAY; 25	ATL; 23	LVS; 29	PHO; 35	CAL; 31	MAR; 24	TEX; 28	BRI; 23	RCH; 19	TAL; 10	KAN; 17	CLT; 23	DOV; 30	POC; 25	MCH; 29	SON; 31	DAY; 6	KEN; 24	NHA; 29	IND; 38	POC; 22	GLN; 27	MCH; 30	BRI; 17	DAR; 25	RCH; 27	CHI; 29	NHA; 29	DOV; 21	CLT; 37	TAL; 10	KAN; 17	MAR; 28	TEX; 30	PHO; 33	HOM; 17	30th	447
2018	David Ragan	38	Ford	DAY; 30	ATL; 23	LVS; 23	PHO; 22	CAL; 25	MAR; 25	TEX; 23	BRI; 12	RCH; 33	TAL; 6	DOV; 27	KAN; 13	CLT; 25	POC; 16	MCH; 38	SON; 22	CHI; 38	DAY; 15	KEN; 18	NHA; 29	POC; 19	GLN; 26	MCH; 27	BRI; 17	DAR; 18	IND; 24	LVS; 27	RCH; 23	CLT; 16	DOV; 24	TAL; 39	KAN; 19	MAR; 18	TEX; 24	PHO; 20	HOM; 20	26th	524
2019	David Ragan	38	Ford	DAY; 30	ATL; 16	LVS; 28	PHO; 25	CAL; 25	MAR; 26	TEX; 25	BRI; 21	RCH; 28	TAL; 23	DOV; 26	KAN; 27	CLT; 15	POC; 30	MCH; 34	SON; 20	CHI; 23	DAY; 38	KEN; 29	NHA; 34	POC; 36	GLN; 22	MCH; 16	BRI; 36	DAR; 26	IND; 20	LVS; 22	RCH; 19	CLT; 35	DOV; 27	TAL; 29	KAN; 26	MAR; 11	TEX; 35	PHO; 36	HOM; 27	31st	388
2020	John Hunter Nemechek	38	Ford	DAY; 11	LVS; 24	CAL; 25	PHO; 25	DAR; 9	DAR; 35	CLT; 16	CLT; 13	BRI; 13	ATL; 23	MAR; 25	HOM; 19	TAL; 8	POC; 24	POC; 19	IND; 15	KEN; 36	TEX; 22	KAN; 19	NHA; 36	MCH; 36	MCH; 23	DAY; 35	DOV; 24	DOV; 20	DAY; 11	DAR; 36	RCH; 30	BRI; 20	LVS; 20	TAL; 8	CLT; 36	KAN; 17	TEX; 22	MAR; 26	PHO; 26	28th	534
2021	Anthony Alfredo	38	Ford	DAY; 32	DAY; 22	HOM; 24	LVS; 24	PHO; 37	ATL; 27	BRI; 39	MAR; 26	RCH; 31	TAL; 12	KAN; 23	DAR; 26	DOV; 28	COA; 18	CLT; 25	SON; 31	NSH; 17	POC; 26	POC; 34	ROA; 37	ATL; 26	NHA; 32	GLN; 26	IND; 38	MCH; 34	DAY; 26	DAR; 24	RCH; 26	BRI; 35	LVS; 27	TAL; 10	CLT; 26	TEX; 29	KAN; 38	MAR; 20	PHO; 34	30th	352
2022	Todd Gilliland	38	Ford	DAY; 33	CAL; 20	LVS; 23	PHO; 19	ATL; 27	COA; 16	RCH; 25	MAR; 30	BRI; 17	TAL; 27	DOV; 28	DAR; 15	KAN; 25	CLT; 16	GTW; 22	SON; 24	NSH; 24	ROA; 25	ATL; 17	NHA; 25	POC; 25	IND; 4	MCH; 27	RCH; 27	GLN; 38	DAY; 23	DAR; 28	KAN; 23	BRI; 18	TEX; 28	TAL; 7	CLT; 30	LVS; 25	HOM; 31	MAR; 13	PHO; 29	30th	531
2023	Todd Gilliland	38	Ford	DAY; 27	CAL; 17	LVS; 31		ATL; 15	COA; 10	RCH; 15	BRD; 8	MAR; 25		DOV; 25	KAN; 24	DAR; 11		GTW; 15		NSH; 35	CSC; 19	ATL; 16	NHA; 21	POC; 15	RCH; 25	MCH; 29	IND; 37	GLN; 11	DAY; 32	DAR; 26	KAN; 25	BRI; 16		TAL; 12		LVS; 26	HOM; 25	MAR; 10	PHO; 30	28th	546
2023	Zane Smith	38	Ford				PHO; 31						TAL; 37				CLT; 10		SON; 34														TEX; 24		ROV; 30					28th	546
2024	Todd Gilliland	38	Ford	DAY; 35	ATL; 26*	LVS; 24	PHO; 17	BRI; 26	COA; 26	RCH; 21	MAR; 13	TEX; 31	TAL; 8	DOV; 31	KAN; 14	DAR; 15	CLT; 17	GTW; 16	SON; 10	IOW; 12	NHA; 12	NSH; 17	CSC; 7	POC; 34	IND; 6	RCH; 17	MCH; 36	DAY; 23	DAR; 17	ATL; 27	GLN; 16	BRI; 32	KAN; 27	TAL; 23	ROV; 18	LVS; 31	HOM; 20	MAR; 26	PHO; 20	22nd	630
2025	Zane Smith	38	Ford	DAY; 36	ATL; 11	COA; 29	PHO; 9	LVS; 23	HOM; 11	MAR; 16	DAR; 12	BRI; 23	TAL; 19	TEX; 17	KAN; 16	CLT; 39	NSH; 13	MCH; 7	MXC; 35	POC; 25	ATL; 7	CSC; 14	SON; 27	DOV; 22	IND; 31	IOW; 36	GLN; 17	RCH; 11	DAY; 31	DAR; 13	GTW; 33	BRI; 3	NHA; 27	KAN; 31	ROV; 24	LVS; 24	TAL; 9	MAR; 25	PHO; 27	28th	615
2026	Zane Smith	38	Ford	DAY; 6	ATL; 7	COA; 33	PHO; 27	LVS; 14	DAR; 22	MAR; 34	BRI; 19	KAN; 32	TAL; 5	TEX; 22	GLN; 18	CLT; 10	NSH; 9	MCH; 33	POC; 37	COR; 4	SON; 18	CHI; 28	ATL; 30	NWS; 22	IND; 15	IOW; 16	RCH; 36	NHA; 13	DAY; 32	DAR; 25	GTW; 36	BRI; 28	KAN; 31	LVS; 36	CLT; 20	PHO; 15	TAL; 19	MAR; 19	HOM; 14	27th	584

=== Car No. 55 history ===
Part-time (2011)

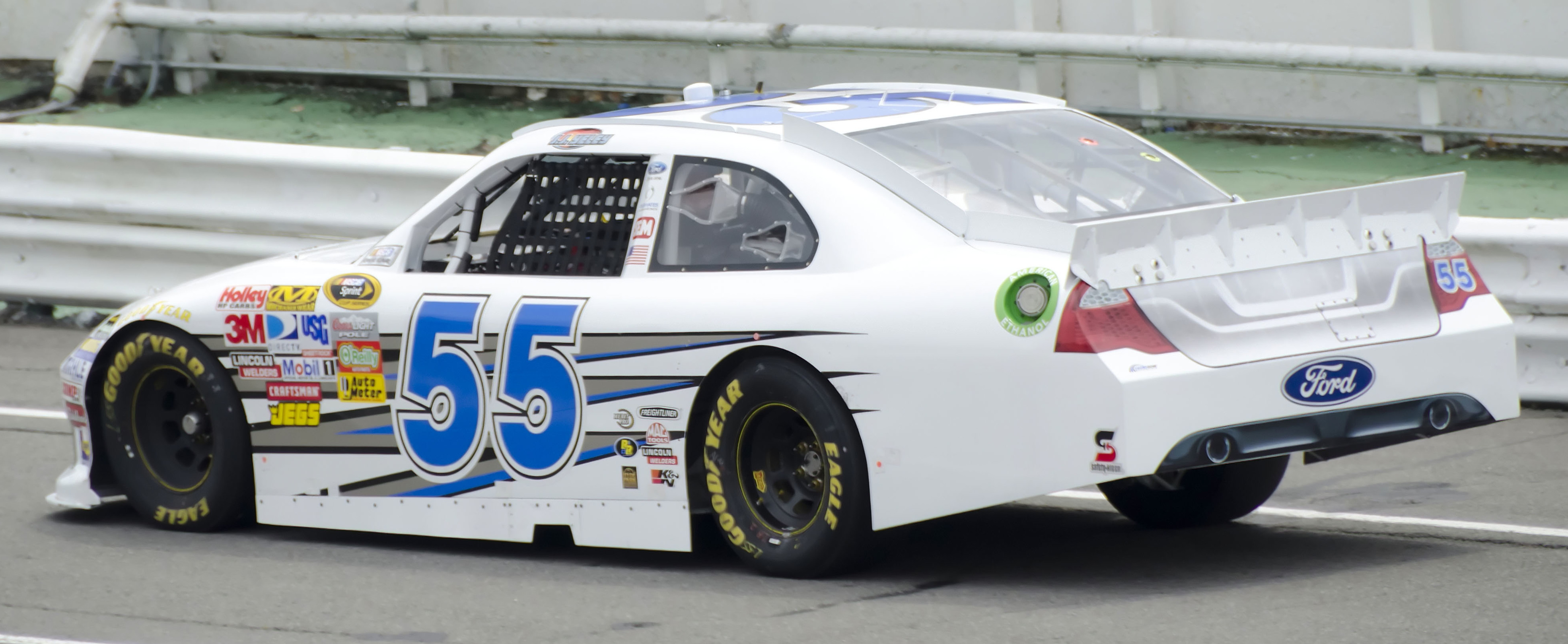
J. J. Yeley in the No. 55 at Pocono Raceway in 2011.

In 2011, Front Row Motorsports took over the No. 55 team & equipment from Michael Waltrip Racing to field a research & development car. It debuted at New Hampshire Motor Speedway with Jeff Green starting and parking. J. J. Yeley and Travis Kvapil split time between the 38 and 55 cars for the remainder of the year.

In 2012, Michael Waltrip Racing reclaimed the No. 55 for its new entry for Mark Martin and Michael Waltrip.

==== Car No. 55 results ====
Year	Driver	No.	Make	1	2	3	4	5	6	7	8	9	10	11	12	13	14	15	16	17	18	19	20	21	22	23	24	25	26	27	28	29	30	31	32	33	34	35	36	Owners	Pts
2011	Jeff Green	55	Ford	DAY	PHO	LVS	BRI	CAL	MAR	TEX	TAL	RCH	DAR	DOV	CLT	KAN	POC	MCH	SON	DAY	KEN	NHA; 43																		48th	27
2011	J. J. Yeley	55	Ford																				IND; DNQ	POC; 43	GLN; 42	MCH; 43	BRI; DNQ		RCH; 42				KAN; 43		TAL; 42	MAR; 40	TEX; 43		HOM; 41	48th	27
2011	Travis Kvapil	55	Ford																									ATL; 42		CHI; DNQ	NHA; 43	DOV; 43		CLT; 40				PHO; 43		48th	27

=== Car No. 61 history ===
Multiple drivers (2006)

In April 2006, Front Row Motorsports purchased the owner points of Peak Fitness Racing. The team originally hired Peak's driver Kevin Lepage to drive however, after just one race, Lepage left Front Row Motorsports, heading to BAM Racing. Chad Chaffin took over the No. 61 car after Lepage's departure. Brian Simo drove the No. 61 car for the road course at Infineon. At the second road course of the season at Watkins Glen, Front Row Motorsports lease out the No. 61 owner points to No Fear Racing and entered the No. 92 with Johnny Miller, but he failed to qualify. After Watkins Glen, the team ran as No. 61 for the remainder of the season. Chaffin ran most of the rest of the races with Stanton Barrett driving the car at Dover and Lepage made the race at Atlanta.

==== Car No. 61 results ====
Year	Driver	No.	Make	1	2	3	4	5	6	7	8	9	10	11	12	13	14	15	16	17	18	19	20	21	22	23	24	25	26	27	28	29	30	31	32	33	34	35	36	Owners	Pts
2006	Kevin Lepage	61	Dodge	DAY	CAL	LVS	ATL	BRI	MAR	TEX	PHO	TAL	RCH; 42																								TEX; DNQ		HOM; DNQ	42nd	1484
2006	Kevin Lepage	61	Chevy																																	ATL; 43				42nd	1484
2006	Chad Chaffin	61	Dodge											DAR; DNQ		DOV; DNQ		MCH; DNQ					POC; DNQ					CAL; DNQ	RCH; 38	NHA; 34		KAN; 37		CLT; DNQ	MAR; DNQ			PHO; 35		42nd	1484
2006	Chad Chaffin	61	Ford												CLT; DNQ		POC; 33																							42nd	1484
2006	Chad Chaffin	61	Chevy																	DAY; 35						MCH; DNQ	BRI; DNQ						TAL; DNQ							42nd	1484
2006	Brian Simo	61	Chevy																SON; DNQ																					42nd	1484
2006	Chad Blount	61	Dodge																		CHI; DNQ																			42nd	1484
2006	Ted Christopher	61	Chevy																			NHA; DNQ																		42nd	1484
2006	Derrike Cope	61	Chevy																					IND; DNQ	GLN															42nd	1484
2006	Stanton Barrett	61	Dodge																												DOV; 35									42nd	1484

=== Car No. 64 history ===
Randy LaJoie (2006)

In 2006, FRM fielded the No. 64 car part-time for Randy LaJoie at the Daytona 500 and Las Vegas in a partnership with Premier Motorsports, a Busch Series team. However, he failed to qualify for both of the races. Damon Lusk was entered later in the season at Pocono, but withdrew mid-week.

==== Car No. 64 results ====
Year	Driver	No.	Make	1	2	3	4	5	6	7	8	9	10	11	12	13	14	15	16	17	18	19	20	21	22	23	24	25	26	27	28	29	30	31	32	33	34	35	36	Owners	Pts
2006	Randy LaJoie	64	Chevy	DAY; DNQ	CAL																																				
2006	Randy LaJoie	64	Dodge			LVS; DNQ	ATL	BRI	MAR	TEX	PHO	TAL	RCH	DAR	CLT	DOV	POC	MCH	SON	DAY	CHI	NHA																			
2006	Damon Lusk	64	Chevy																				POC; Wth	IND	GLN	MCH	BRI	CAL	RCH	NHA	DOV	KAN	TAL	CLT	MAR	ATL	TEX	PHO	HOM		

=== Car No. 92 history ===
Multiple drivers (2004–2006)

This car debuted in the 2004 Chevy Rock and Roll 400 with Brad Teague driving the Broadway Motors Ford. The car would fail to qualify, running 49th out of 51 cars that set a time.

FRM fielded the No. 92 Chevy for multiple drivers in 2005. It debuted at the 2005 Daytona 500 with Stanton Barrett driving, but it did not qualify. After missing the next three races, the team finally got into a race at the Food City 500 at Bristol Motor Speedway, where Barrett finished 41st after suffering oil pressure problems. After the spring Dover race, Tony Raines drove the car at the Chevy American Revolution 400 at Richmond International Raceway, finishing 35th. Then Hermie Sadler and Eric McClure began sharing the ride, although McClure did not qualify for a race in the car. Johnny Miller ran the car at Watkins Glen, finishing 29th. Another driver, Chad Chaffin, also took over driving duties, failing to qualify in his initial attempt at Martinsville Speedway, and then qualifying 43rd the next week at Atlanta Motor Speedway before surrendering the car to Bobby Hamilton Jr. Late in the year, the team formed an equipment-sharing partnership with Mach 1 Racing, and that eventually turned into the team moving into Mach 1's shop and hiring their old crew.

Chad Chaffin began the 2006 season with the No. 92 team, however, after two races he was moved to the No. 34 team. Chad Blount would then take over the car until Talladega where FRM decided the team shut down the No. 92 operation. The team just made one of the nine races it attempted and cited lack of performance as a reason for the team's shut down.

==== Car No. 92 results ====
Year	Driver	No.	Make	1	2	3	4	5	6	7	8	9	10	11	12	13	14	15	16	17	18	19	20	21	22	23	24	25	26	27	28	29	30	31	32	33	34	35	36	Owners	Pts
2004	Brad Teague	92	Ford	DAY	CAR	LVS	ATL	DAR	BRI	TEX	MAR	TAL	CAL	RCH	CLT	DOV	POC	MCH	SON	DAY	CHI	NHA	POC	IND	GLN	MCH	BRI	CAL	RCH; DNQ											69th	54
2004	Tony Raines	92	Ford																											NHA; DNQ										69th	54
2004	Stanton Barrett	92	Ford																												DOV; DNQ	TAL	KAN	CLT	MAR	ATL	PHO	DAR	HOM	69th	54
2005	Stanton Barrett	92	Chevy	DAY; DNQ	CAL; DNQ	LVS; DNQ	ATL; DNQ	BRI; 41	MAR; DNQ	TEX; DNQ	PHO; 30	TAL; DNQ	DAR; 31			DOV; 34			SON; DNQ																					41st	1395
2005	Tony Raines	92	Chevy											RCH; 35	CLT; DNQ									IND; DNQ																41st	1395
2005	Hermie Sadler	92	Chevy														POC; DNQ			DAY; 30		NHA; DNQ	POC; DNQ				BRI; 30		RCH; DNQ		DOV; DNQ									41st	1395
2005	Eric McClure	92	Chevy															MCH; DNQ								MCH; DNQ														41st	1395
2005	Kenny Wallace	92	Chevy																		CHI; DNQ																			41st	1395
2005	Johnny Miller	92	Chevy																						GLN; 29															41st	1395
2005	Hermie Sadler	92	Dodge																									CAL; 42												41st	1395
2005	Joey McCarthy	92	Dodge																											NHA; 31										41st	1395
2005	Mike Skinner	92	Chevy																													TAL; QL^{†}								41st	1395
2005	P. J. Jones	92	Dodge																														KAN; 41							41st	1395
2005	P. J. Jones	92	Chevy																															CLT; DNQ			TEX; DNQ	PHO; DNQ		41st	1395
2005	Chad Chaffin	92	Chevy																																MAR; DNQ	ATL; QL^{†}			HOM; DNQ	41st	1395
2006	Chad Chaffin	92	Chevy	DAY; DNQ	CAL; Wth	LVS																																		58th	168
2006	Chad Blount	92	Dodge				ATL; DNQ	BRI; DNQ	MAR; 42	TEX; DNQ	PHO; DNQ	TAL; DNQ	RCH	DAR	CLT	DOV	POC	MCH	SON	DAY	CHI	NHA	POC	IND																58th	168
2006	Johnny Miller	92	Chevy																						GLN; DNQ	MCH	BRI	CAL	RCH	NHA	DOV	KAN	TAL	CLT	MAR	ATL	TEX	PHO	HOM	58th	168
^{†} - Qualified but slots bought by PPI Motorsports

== Nationwide Series ==
=== Car No. 24 results ===
Eric McClure (2008)

In 2008, Front Row Motorsports focused their efforts on the Nationwide Series, with Eric McClure driving the No. 24 Hefty Chevrolet, with a best finish of 15th at Talladega Superspeedway. McClure ran the full season, except for the road courses where Brian Simo ran the No. 24 car.

The team also attempted to buy out the fledgling Specialty Racing team, for a time fielding the No. 61 Cone Solvents Chevrolet with driver Kevin Lepage. However, after the July race at Daytona, Specialty Racing hired Brandon Whitt to drive the No. 61, and returned to Ford, disregarding the supposed buyout, leading Front Row Motorsports and Kevin Lepage to file a lawsuit against the team. McClure, meanwhile, finished the year 21st in points. McClure left the team at the end of the 2008 season, bringing sponsor Hefty and the No. 24 to Team Rensi Motorsports.

==== Car No. 24 results ====
Year	Driver	No.	Make	1	2	3	4	5	6	7	8	9	10	11	12	13	14	15	16	17	18	19	20	21	22	23	24	25	26	27	28	29	30	31	32	33	34	35	Owners	Pts
2008	Eric McClure	24	Chevy	DAY; 34	CAL; 28	LVS; 22	ATL; 33	BRI; 30	NSH; 31	TEX; 36	PHO; 29		TAL; 15	RCH; 32	DAR; 33	CLT; 29	DOV; 26	NSH; 28	KEN; 28	MLW; 29	NHA; 27	DAY; 38	CHI; 32	GTY; 21	IRP; 27			MCH; 27	BRI; 31	CAL; 32	RCH; 29	DOV; 24	KAN; 33	CLT; 22	MEM; 27	TEX; 32	PHO; 32	HOM; 32		
2008	Brian Simo	24	Chevy									MXC; 28														CGV; 30	GLN; 20													

=== Car No. 34 history ===
Tony Raines (2009–2010)

In 2009, Front Row Motorsports ran the No. 34 Chevrolet Impala SS with veteran Tony Raines returning to the series full-time. Scott Eggleston crew-chiefed the car, who has been with FRM since 2007. The entry was mostly unsponsored, with Jenkins advertising his Long John Silver's franchises on the car. Raines and his team were able to drive to fourth at the Aaron's 312 at Talladega Superspeedway, FRM's first-ever top-ten or top-five in either series, in addition to a fifteenth-place finish at Las Vegas and Richmond. Later in the season, he had a sixth place finish in the rain at the NAPA Auto Parts 200, and a strong tenth place finish at Lowes Motor Speedway, finishing the year 12th in drivers points.

It was announced that Front Row Motorsports would lease their Nationwide team, running Chevrolets, to TriStar Motorsports in 2010 after FRM's announcement to become a factory-backed Ford team. The partnership ended with TriStar Motorsports purchasing all remaining assets of FRM's Nationwide team. FRM is no longer involved in the Nationwide Series.

==== Car No. 34 results ====
Year	Driver	No.	Make	1	2	3	4	5	6	7	8	9	10	11	12	13	14	15	16	17	18	19	20	21	22	23	24	25	26	27	28	29	30	31	32	33	34	35	Owners	Pts
2009	Tony Raines	34	Chevy	DAY; 31	CAL; 21	LVS; 15	BRI; 32	TEX; 22	NSH; 27	PHO; 24	TAL; 4	RCH; 15	DAR; 21	CLT; 26	DOV; 28	NSH; 19	KEN; 21	MLW; 21	NHA; 30	DAY; 23	CHI; 23	GTY; 12	IRP; 15	IOW; 18			BRI; 23	CGV; 6		RCH; 22	DOV; 15		CAL; 20	CLT; 10	MEM; 18	TEX; 15	PHO; 21	HOM; 23		
2009	Tony Raines	34	Dodge																						GLN; 28	MCH; 33			ATL; 24			KAN; 23								
2010	Tony Raines	34	Chevy	DAY; 14	CAL; 25	LVS; 22	BRI; 22	NSH; 32	PHO; 14	TEX; 22	TAL; 7	RCH; 24	DAR; 18	DOV; 17	CLT; 25	NSH; 23	KEN; 19	ROA; 36	NHA; 18	DAY; 24	CHI; 23	GTY; 10	IRP; 18	IOW; 29	GLN; 28	MCH; 24	BRI; 26	CGV	ATL	RCH	DOV	KAN	CAL	CLT	GTY	TEX	PHO	HOM		

=== Car No. 36 history ===
In 2010, Front Row Motorsports fielded the No. 36 Chevrolet in partnership with TriStar Motorsports with Kevin Hamlin, Johnny Sauter, and Jeff Green behind the wheel.

==== Car No. 36 results ====
Year	Driver	No.	Make	1	2	3	4	5	6	7	8	9	10	11	12	13	14	15	16	17	18	19	20	21	22	23	24	25	26	27	28	29	30	31	32	33	34	35	Owners	Pts
2010	Kevin Hamlin	36	Chevy	DAY	CAL	LVS	BRI	NSH	PHO	TEX	TAL	RCH	DAR	DOV	CLT	NSH	KEN	ROA	NHA	DAY	CHI; DNQ				GLN; 42	MCH														
2010	Johnny Sauter	36	Chevy																			GTY; 41																		
2010	Jeff Green	36	Chevy																				IRP; 40	IOW; 43			BRI; 43	CGV	ATL	RCH	DOV	KAN	CAL	CLT	GTY	TEX	PHO	HOM		

=== Car No. 43 history ===
In 2008, Front Row Motorsports fielded the No. 43 Chevrolet for Kevin Lepage at Chicagoland. However, he failed to qualify for the race.

==== Car No. 43 results ====
Year	Driver	No.	Make	1	2	3	4	5	6	7	8	9	10	11	12	13	14	15	16	17	18	19	20	21	22	23	24	25	26	27	28	29	30	31	32	33	34	35	Owners	Pts
2008	Kevin Lepage	43	Chevy	DAY	CAL	LVS	ATL	BRI	NSH	TEX	PHO	MXC	TAL	RCH	DAR	CLT	DOV	NSH	KEN	MLW	NHA	DAY	CHI; DNQ	GTY	IRP	CGV	GLN	MCH	BRI	CAL	RCH	DOV	KAN	CLT	MEM	TEX	PHO	HOM		

== Craftsman Truck Series ==
=== Truck No. 34 history ===
Brett Moffitt (2023)

During the 2023 season, FRM fielded the No. 34 Ford with Brett Moffitt at Talladega, which he drove to victory lane.

Layne Riggs (2025–present)

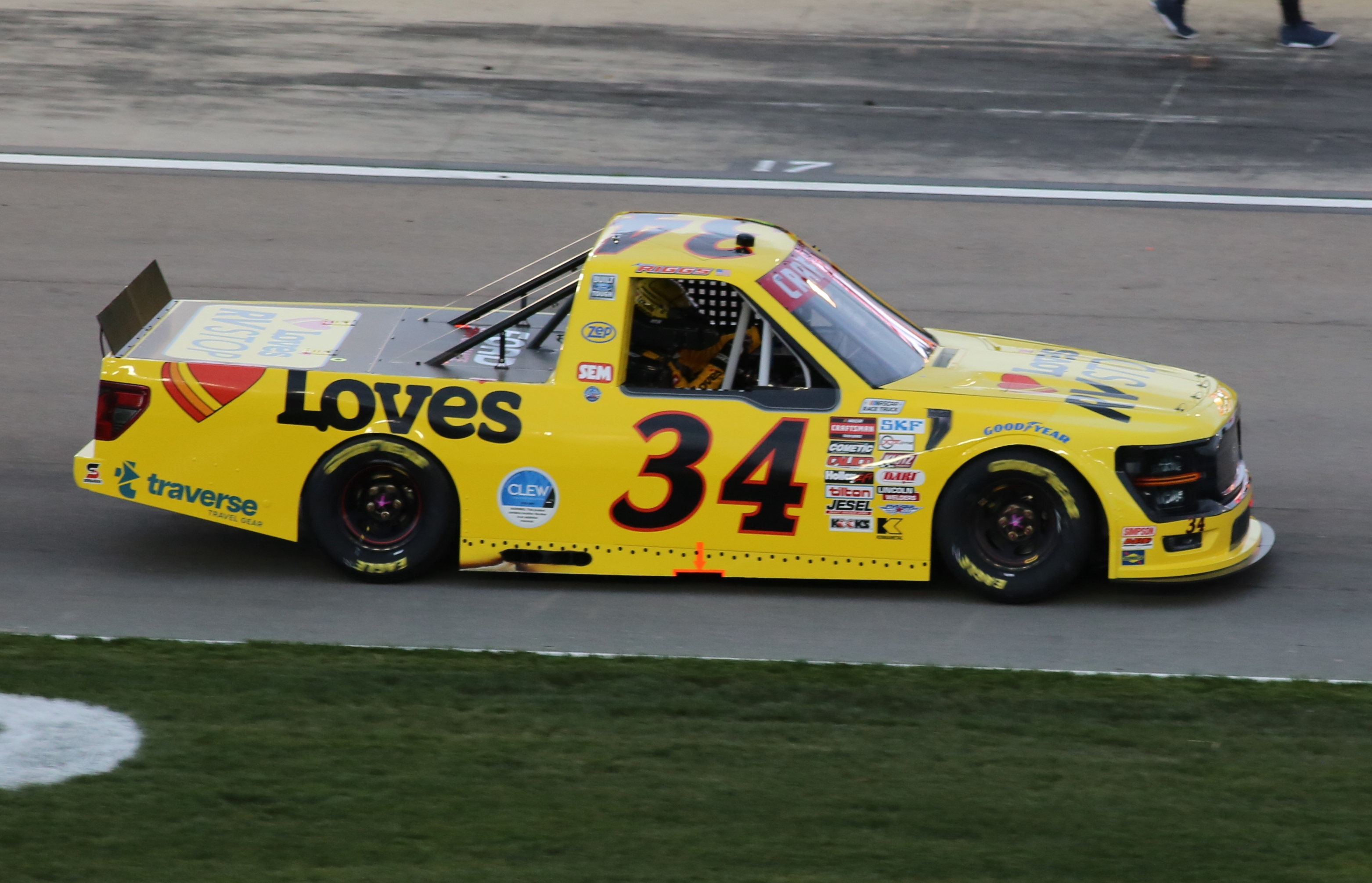
Layne Riggs in the No. 34 truck at Las Vegas Motor Speedway in 2025

FRM added a second full-time truck for the 2025 season. Layne Riggs was moved from the No. 38 to the No. 34, with Chandler Smith taking over the No. 38 truck. Riggs started the 2025 season with a thirteenth place finish at Daytona. He scored his first win of the season at Pocono. One month later, he won at IRP after passing Stewart Friesen and holding off Corey Day. In the playoffs, he won at Bristol, moving himself into the Round of 8. He missed the Championship 4 in a tiebreaker with Kaden Honeycutt after the Martinsville race. The following week he finished fourth at Phoenix. He ended the season with three wins and sixteen top tens.

Riggs started the 2026 season with a 31st place DNF at Daytona. He scored his first win of the season in the inaugural street race at St. Petersburg. He also won back-to-back weeks at Charlotte and Nashville. At the inaugural race at Coronado Street Course, he would go on to hold off part-time driver Tyler Reif to score his third wins of the season. He also wins his second-consecutive win at IRP and the final race of the regular season at New Hampshire. During "The Chase", he won at fall Charlotte race sweeping both of the Charlotte races of the season.

==== Truck No. 34 results ====
Year	Driver	No.	Make	1	2	3	4	5	6	7	8	9	10	11	12	13	14	15	16	17	18	19	20	21	22	23	24	25	Owners	Pts
2023	Brett Moffitt	34	Ford	DAY	LVS	ATL	COA	TEX	BRD	MAR	KAN	DAR	NWS	CLT	GTW	NSH	MOH	POC	RCH	IRP	MLW	KAN	BRI	TAL; 1	HOM	PHO			41st	40
2025	Layne Riggs	34	Ford	DAY; 13	ATL; 20	LVS; 5	HOM; 2	MAR; 11	BRI; 6	CAR; 11	TEX; 28	KAN; 31	NWS; 2	CLT; 4	NSH; 3	MCH; 10	POC; 1	LRP; 13	IRP; 1*	GLN; 10	RCH; 3	DAR; 17*	BRI; 1	NHA; 3	ROV; 21	TAL; 5	MAR; 3	PHO; 4	4th	4033
2026	Layne Riggs	34	Ford	DAY; 31	ATL; 27	STP; 1*	DAR; 12	ROC; 3	BRI; 22	TEX; 6	GLN; 21	DOV; 3	CLT; 1*	NSH; 1*	MCH; 4	COR; 1*	LRP; 23*	NWS; 2	IRP; 1*	RCH; 15	NHA; 1*	BRI; 32*	KAN; 19	CLT; 1	PHO; 3	TAL; 8	MAR; 3*	HOM; 32	2nd	2388

=== Truck No. 38 history ===
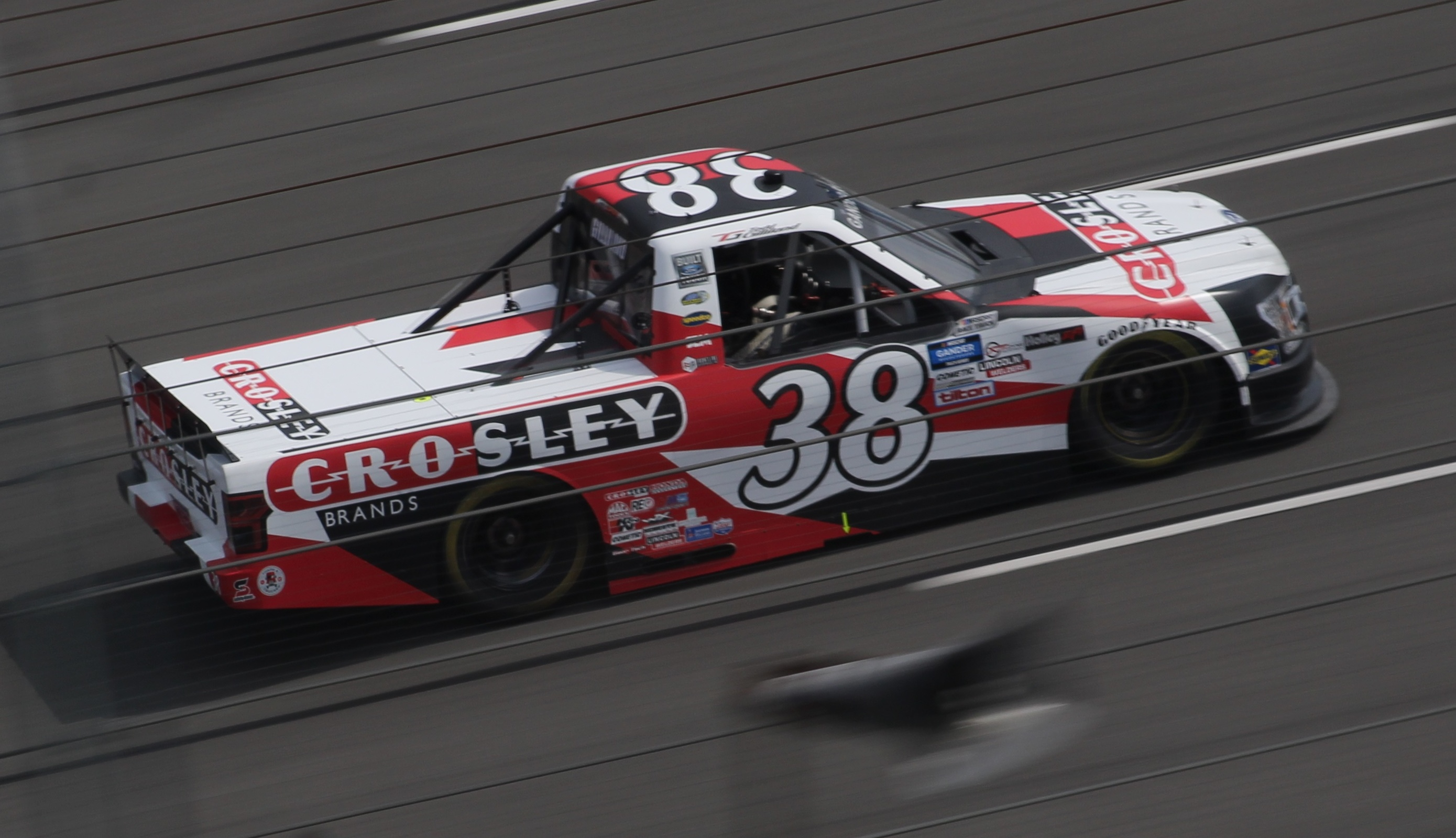
The No. 38 FRM truck of Todd Gilliland at Pocono Raceway in 2020

Todd Gilliland (2020–2021)

On January 13, 2020, FRM announced they would attempt the full 2020 NASCAR Gander RV & Outdoors Truck Series season with Todd Gilliland driving the No. 38 Ford.

Gilliland returned to the No. 38 in 2021. Todd Gilliland won his second career Truck series at Circuit of the Americas, his first win for FRM.

Zane Smith (2022–2023)

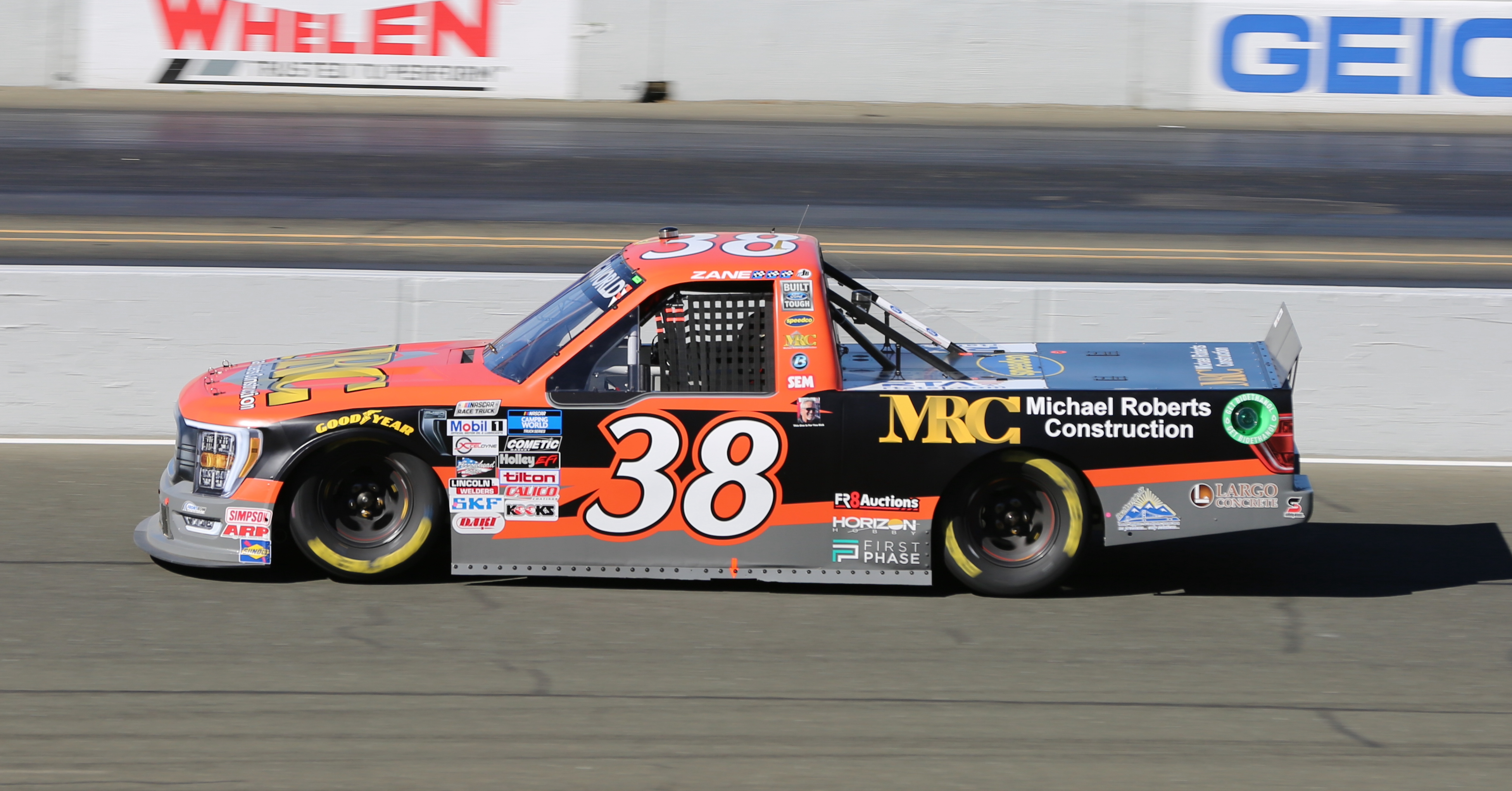
Zane Smith in the No. 38 truck at Sonoma Raceway in 2022

On November 30, 2021, it was announced that Zane Smith would drive the No. 38 truck for 2022 season, replacing Gilliland, who moved to the NASCAR Cup Series. Smith began the 2022 season by winning at Daytona. He finished in second place at Las Vegas, but was disqualified after a post-race inspection found a lug nut violation. Following the 2022 CRC Brakleen 150 at Pocono Raceway, Smith clinched the regular season championship. On November 4, Smith claimed his first Truck Series championship after winning at Phoenix. It was also FRM's first championship in any NASCAR division.

Smith began the 2023 season by winning at Daytona for the second year in a row. He also won at the Circuit of the Americas and scored eight top-five finishes during the regular season. During the playoffs, Smith made it to the Round of 8. He finished second at Homestead, but was disqualified and eliminated after post-race inspection discovered unapproved windshield supports. Smith announced in September he would not be returning to the team in 2024, after signing a deal with Trackhouse Racing to drive for Spire Motorsports in Cup.

Layne Riggs (2024)

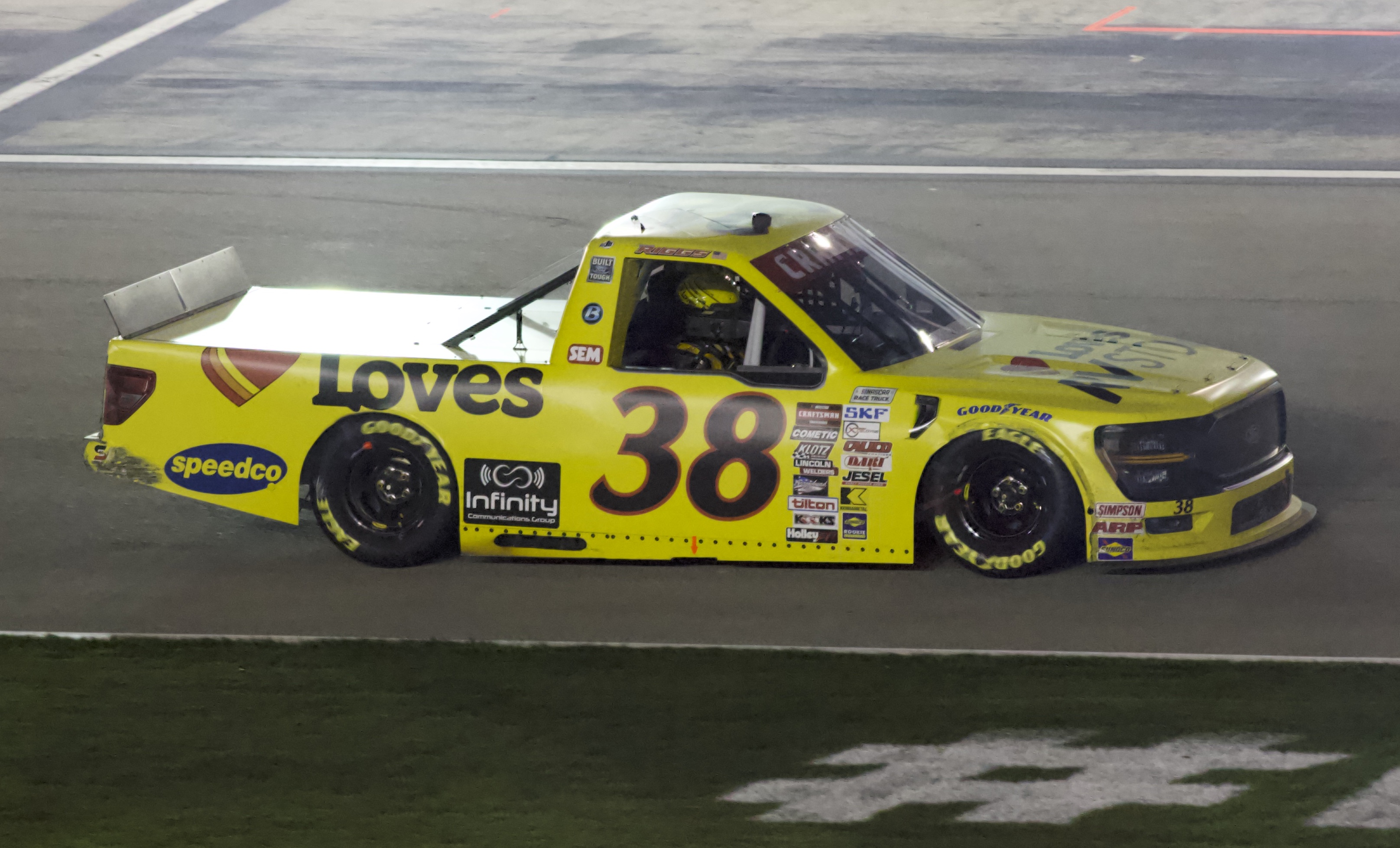
Layne Riggs in the No. 38 truck at Las Vegas Motor Speedway in 2024.

On December 14, 2023, Layne Riggs was announced as the full-time driver of the No. 38 Truck, with Dylan Cappello being promoted to crew chief. Riggs started the 2024 season with a 33rd place DNF at Daytona. A week later, he finished 24th at Atlanta, but was disqualified after a post-race inspection revealed improperly installed windshield fasteners. Despite failing to make the playoffs, Riggs scored his first two career wins at Milwaukee and Bristol. At Homestead, NASCAR imposed an L1 penalty on the No. 38, docked the team ten driver and owner points, and suspended Cappello for the Martinsville race after the truck was found to be underweight during pre-race inspection.

Chandler Smith (2025–2026)

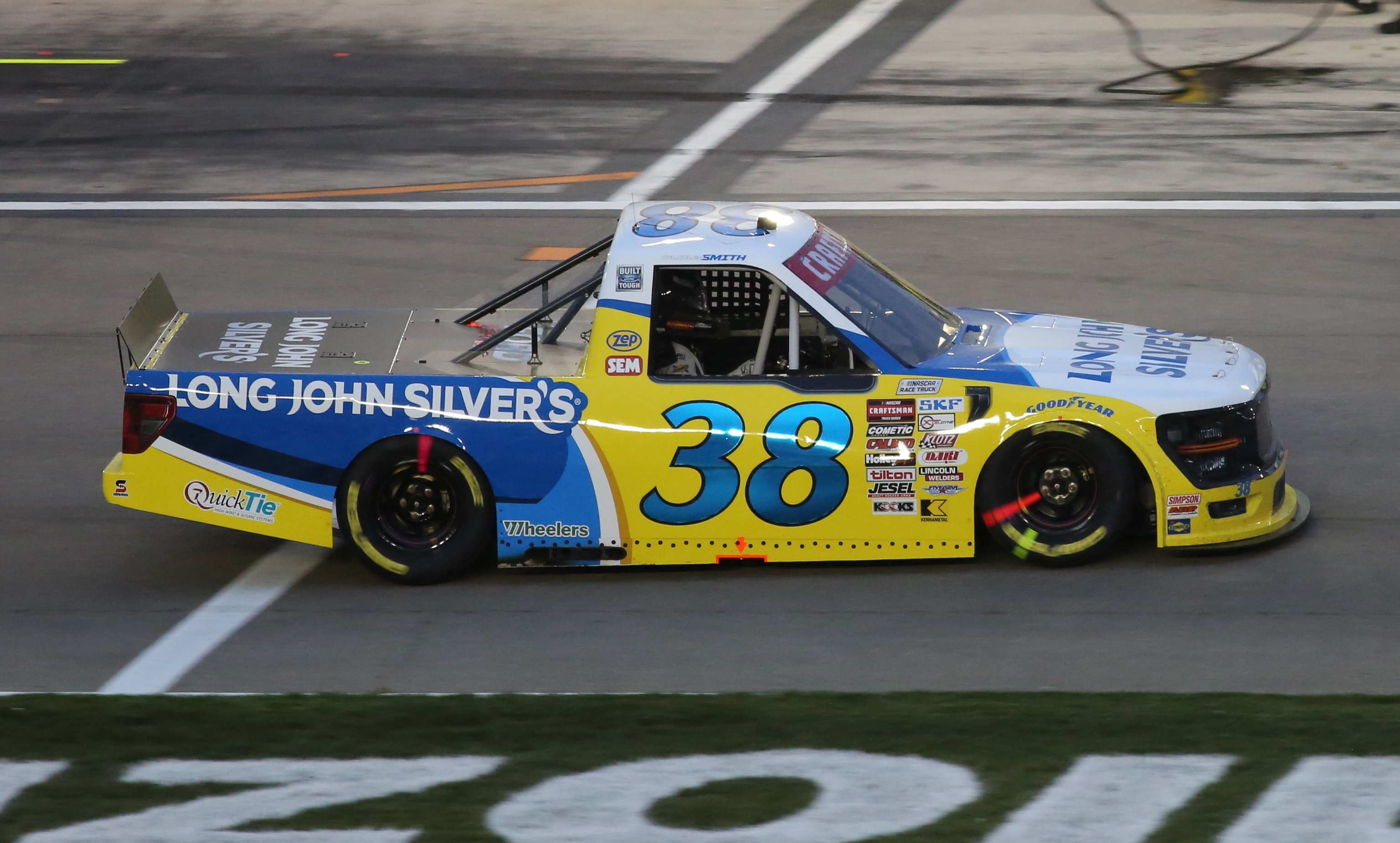
Chandler Smith in the No. 38 truck at Las Vegas Motor Speedway in 2025

For the 2025 season, FRM added a second full-time truck, and signed Chandler Smith. Layne Riggs was moved to the No. 34, with Chandler Smith driving the No. 38. Smith started the season with a sixth place finish at Daytona. He scored his first win of the season at Bristol. He scored his second win at North Wilkesboro.

Smith started the 2026 season with a win at Daytona. Smith was the points leader until Rockingham, where he failed post race inspection. He also won at North Wilkesboro. On July 28, Smith announced that he would not return to FRM in 2027. During "The Chase", he scored a win at Martinsville.

Jake Garcia (2027)

On September 29, 2026, it was announced that Jake Garcia would drive the No. 38 truck full-time for 2027 season.

==== Truck No. 38 results ====
Year	Driver	No.	Make	1	2	3	4	5	6	7	8	9	10	11	12	13	14	15	16	17	18	19	20	21	22	23	24	25	Owners	Pts
2020	Todd Gilliland	38	Ford	DAY; 16	LVS; 7	CLT; 37	ATL; 4	HOM; 6	POC; 4	KEN; 10	TEX; 27	KAN; 10	KAN; 20	MCH; 5	DAY; 33	DOV; 4	GTW; 24*	DAR; 7	RCH; 17	BRI; 14	LVS; 13	TAL; 28	KAN; 13	TEX; 31	MAR; 32	PHO; 9			12th	603
2021	Todd Gilliland	38	Ford	DAY; 31	DAY; 4	LVS; 13	ATL; 17	BRI; 4	RCH; 6	KAN; 6	DAR; 15	COA; 1	CLT; 5	TEX; 7	NSH; 2	POC; 7	KNX; 4	GLN; 4	GTW; 29	DAR; 4	BRI; 10	LVS; 5	TAL; 3	MAR; 25*	PHO; 8				7th	2262
2022	Zane Smith	38	Ford	DAY; 1	LVS; 36	ATL; 5	COA; 1	MAR; 9	BRI; 10	DAR; 7	KAN; 1	TEX; 32	CLT; 5	GTW; 9	SON; 2	KNX; 3	NSH; 2	MOH; 2	POC; 13	IRP; 3	RCH; 9	KAN; 4	BRI; 2	TAL; 17	HOM; 2	PHO; 1*			1st	4040
2023	Zane Smith	38	Ford	DAY; 1	LVS; 2	ATL; 20	COA; 1*	TEX; 14	BRD; 21	MAR; 3	KAN; 3	DAR; 22	NWS; 32	CLT; 23	GTW; 20	NSH; 2	MOH; 2	POC; 34	RCH; 3	IRP; 5	MLW; 12	KAN; 5	BRI; 24	TAL; 32	HOM; 34	PHO; 25			7th	2194
2024	Layne Riggs	38	Ford	DAY; 33	ATL; 33	LVS; 22	BRI; 10	COA; 27	MAR; 15	TEX; 31	KAN; 18	DAR; 21	NWS; 3	CLT; 28	GTW; 5	NSH; 25	POC; 30	IRP; 5	RCH; 5	MLW; 1	BRI; 1	KAN; 2	TAL; 28	HOM; 22	MAR; 6	PHO; 10			11th	595
2025	Chandler Smith	38	Ford	DAY; 6	ATL; 5	LVS; 8	HOM; 8	MAR; 4	BRI; 1*	CAR; 13	TEX; 16	KAN; 17	NWS; 1	CLT; 34	NSH; 7	MCH; 8	POC; 7	LRP; 6	IRP; 6	GLN; 23	RCH; 9	DAR; 30	BRI; 30	NHA; 2	ROV; 19	TAL; 22	MAR; 6	PHO; 8	9th	2179
2026	Chandler Smith	38	Ford	DAY; 1	ATL; 6	STP; 4	DAR; 17	ROC; 36	BRI; 2	TEX; 10	GLN; 5	DOV; 12	CLT; 30	NSH; 3	MCH; 5	COR; 22	LRP; 30	NWS; 1*	IRP; 4	RCH; 7	NHA; 2	BRI; 24	KAN; 6	CLT; 5	PHO; 15	TAL; 14	MAR; 1	HOM; 7	3rd	2340
