= Andy Lally =

American racing driver (born 1975)

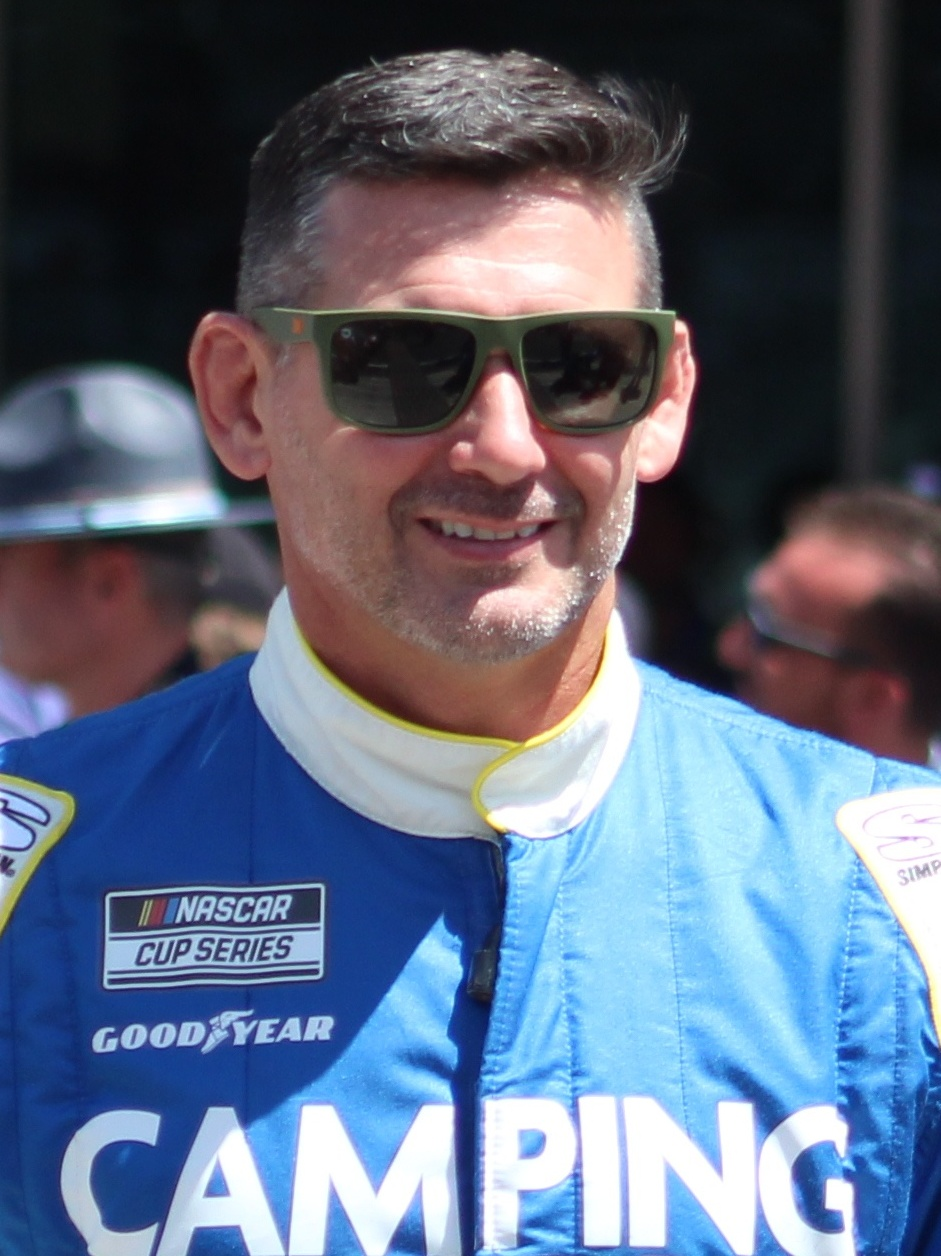
- Lally at Indianapolis Motor Speedway in 2023
- Born: Andrew Joseph Lally; February 11, 1975 (age 51); Northport, New York, U.S.
- Achievements: 1994 WKA Gold Cup Champion; 1996 NESCCA RoadRally Series Champion; 2001 Grand-Am Rolex Sports Car Series SRPII class Champion; 2004 Grand Am SGS class Champion; 2006 Grand Am GT class Champion; Five-time Rolex 24 at Daytona class winner
- Awards: 1997 US F2000 Rookie of the Year; 2011 NASCAR Sprint Cup Series Rookie of the Year

NASCAR Cup Series career
- 45 races run over 6 years
- 2022 position: 62nd
- Best finish: 33rd (2011)
- First race: 2009 Heluva Good! Sour Cream Dips at The Glen (Watkins Glen)
- Last race: 2023 Bank of America Roval 400 (Charlotte Roval)
Wins	Top tens	Poles
0	0	0

NASCAR O'Reilly Auto Parts Series career
- 23 races run over 10 years
- 2022 position: 45th
- Best finish: 35th (2021)
- First race: 2007 NAPA Auto Parts 200 (Montreal)
- Last race: 2022 Drive for the Cure 250 (Charlotte Roval)
Wins	Top tens	Poles
0	9	0

NASCAR FedEx Freight Truck Series career
- 14 races run over 4 years
- 2010 position: 96th
- Best finish: 32nd (2008)
- First race: 2007 Silverado 350K (Texas)
- Last race: 2010 Mountain Dew 250 (Talladega)
Wins	Top tens	Poles
0	0	0

Rolex Sports Car Series
- Categorisation: FIA Gold
- Former teams: The Racer's Group
- Starts: 130
- Wins: 26
- Poles: 13

Championship titles
- SRPII class SGS class GT class: 2001; 2004; 2006
- Statistics up to date as of June 24, 2023.

Andrew Joseph Lally (born February 11, 1975) is an American former professional auto racing driver who currently serves as the president for the Trans Am Series.

Lally competed full-time in the WeatherTech SportsCar Championship, driving the Audi R8 for Magnus Racing and part-time in the Michelin Pilot Challenge, driving the Hyundai Elantra TCR Touring Car for StarCom Racing.

== Racing career ==
Lally began his career in karting, culminating with two WKA National Gold Cup Championships. He first got into sports car racing in 1993 with his first sponsor Tyrolean Motors with car owner Walter Simendinger running SCCA regional events. In 1997, Lally won the US F2000 Rookie of the Year in his first full year in a professional series.

Although Lally won the 2011 NASCAR Cup Series Rookie of the Year, he is best known for his road racing expertise in the Grand-Am Rolex Sports Car Series (Now IMSA WeatherTech SportsCar Championship) as well as the American Le Mans Series. In May 2010, Lally became only the second driver in the history of the Grand-Am Rolex Series to make one-hundred starts, winning at Virginia International Raceway on April 24, 2010. In January 2012, Lally extended and broke records in the Grand-Am Rolex Series by winning his fourth Rolex 24 Hours of Daytona in the GT class. Lally won his fifth class victory at Daytona International Speedway on January 31, 2016, tying him for fourth on the all-time win list at the Rolex 24 Hours of Daytona.

In 2017, after five years of being with Magnus Racing, Lally signed with Acura and Michael Shank Racing to debut the brand new 2017 Acura NSX. Lally teamed with Katherine Legge and together they scored the first and second win worldwide for the brand at the Detroit Grand Prix and Watkins Glen International. Lally also scored the first pole position for the car worldwide at Watkins Glen for the 6 Hours of Watkins Glen.

For 2018, Lally re-joined Magnus Racing in an Audi R8 LMS and started the season at The Rolex 24 at Daytona.

Lally has scored three top-ten finishes in his last four starts in the NASCAR Xfinity Series with a fifth-place finish at the 2017 Mid-Ohio Sports Car Course race being a career-best.

Lally owns Grand Am records for most GT wins, most podiums, and most top-five finishes in Rolex Series history.

On December 4, 2024, Lally announced that after the 2025 Rolex 24 at Daytona he would retire from professional driving. Lally competed in his last race with Magnus Racing in an Aston Martin Vantage GT3 Evo. His final race was ultimately cut short as the car was retired within six hours of the green flag. Immediately following his retirement in 2025, Lally took over as President of the Trans Am Series but still intends to participate in the Rolex 24 annually.

=== Road racing ===
Lally is a three-time Grand-Am Rolex Series Champion. He holds series records for most all-time top-three and top-five finishes and leads the all-time GT class win list with 26 victories. In January 2011, Lally won the 24 Hours of Daytona in the GT class, giving him the record for most consecutive Grand-Am Rolex seasons with at least one victory (eight), spanning from 2004 to 2011. In January 2011, Lally finished first place in the GT class in the 24 Hours of Daytona giving him the most podium finishes of any driver at the famed 24 race (7) since the Grand-Am Rolex series started in 2000. His victory at Daytona International Speedway on January 29, 2011, made him the all-time winningest GT driver in the Grand-Am Series.

On May 13, 2012, racing with the Magnus Racing team in the No. 44, Lally yet again made history in sports car racing as he became the first driver in Grand-Am history to achieve his one-hundredth podium finish at New Jersey Motorsports Park as he and his teammate John Potter finished the race in third place. Lally scored podium 101 when he and Potter went on to win the first-ever endurance sports car race at the famed Indianapolis Motor Speedway on July 7, 2012, which also locked up the 2012 North American Endurance Championship. His prototype results include a first in class at the Rolex 24 Hours of Daytona, second in class at the Petit Le Mans, third in Class at the 24 Hours of Le Mans and a second overall and in class at the 2008 12 Hours of Sebring.

=== NASCAR ===
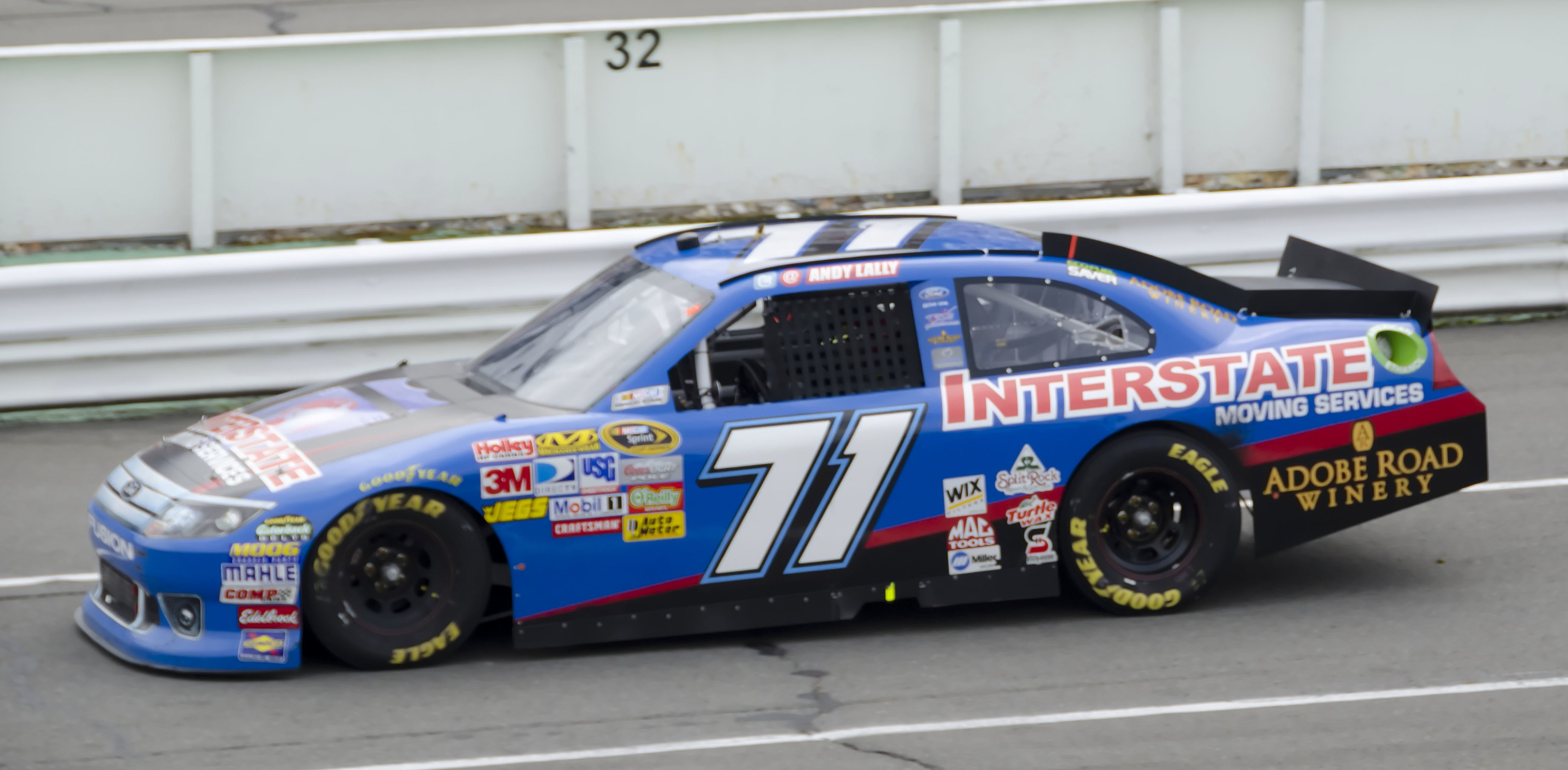
Lally's No. 71 Sprint Cup Series car at Pocono Raceway in 2011

In 2007, Lally made his NASCAR debut in both the Busch Series (now NASCAR Xfinity Series) and the NASCAR Craftsman Truck Series (now NASCAR Gander Outdoors Truck Series). Lally had one top-ten finish in two starts with the No. 47 Wood Brothers/JTG Racing Ford Fusion and made three starts in the Truck Series with TRG Motorsports, driving the No. 00 Toyota Tundra.

Lally raced in the Inaugural ARCA Racing Series Loud Energy Drink 150 at New Jersey Motorsports Park in September 2008. He was fastest in every practice session, started on the pole, and led the most laps, but lost the race on pit strategy when the race was called due to weather with eventual series champion Justin Allgaier winning the race. In 2009, he started 15th driving the No. 71 Chevrolet for TRG in the NASCAR Sprint Cup Series at Watkins Glen International. He ran as a teammate to David Gilliland, the usual driver of the No. 71, who unsuccessfully attempted to qualify in the No. 70. Lally finished a respectable 27th in his first Cup start after being involved in a crash with Sam Hornish Jr., Jeff Gordon and Jeff Burton.

In 2010, Lally ran seven races for TRG, finishing eighteenth at Watkins Glen. On February 17, 2011, he filed paperwork to run the full Sprint Cup season and campaign for series Rookie of the Year honors (A driver may maintain his rookie eligibility provided he runs seven or fewer races in a season before declaring).

Running the full 2011 season for TRG in the No. 71 and No. 77 cars, Lally clinched the 2011 Rookie of the Year honor in early September, his competitors for the honor, Brian Keselowski and T. J. Bell, having failed to make the minimum number of starts in the series to be eligible for the award.

In 2014, Lally made a return to the Nationwide Series at Road America to race the No. 55 for Bobby Dotter. Lally qualified tenth and finished seventh.

2015 saw Lally run a partial schedule in the Xfinity Series in the No. 90 for King Autosport while maintaining his full-time ride with Magnus Racing in the No. 44 Porsche in the IMSA Series. In 2016, Lally would return to the Xfinity Series at Mid Ohio driving the No. 90 in place of Mario Gosselin. It was a wet and rainy race where cars were sliding all over the place, going off the track, and spinning out. Lally was running well and then was hit from behind and spun in a multi-car accident with Brendan Gaughan and Erik Jones. Lally would recover and finish seventh, getting his third top-ten in the Xfinity Series. His fourth top-ten finish would come in August 2017, again at Mid Ohio in his only start of the season and placing fifth. This was the best result of any driver only making one race start in 2017. Lally planned on running at least three races for 2018 in the NASCAR Xfinity Series.

After not running any of the Xfinity Series road course races in 2019, Lally returned to the series for 2020, driving the No. 02 for Our Motorsports. Full-time Truck Series driver Brett Moffitt, the usual driver of that car, could not participate in both races as he was at Michigan for the Truck Series race on the same weekend as Road America, and due to NASCAR's rule only allowing drivers to compete in one race at the Daytona Road Course, Moffitt could not run that race either.

Lally returned to Our Motorsports in 2021 to run some of the Xfinity Series road course races beginning at the Daytona Road Course, now in February the week after the Daytona 300 as the second race of the season. That year, Moffitt joined the team full-time in the No. 02, and the team added a second full-time car, the No. 23, which Lally made his starts in. Lally was initially going to drive the No. 03 for Our for the Super Start Batteries 188, but the car failed to qualify due to lack of qualifying and not being high enough in owner points, after not showing up for the inaugural race of the season, the Daytona 300. He would then transfer over to the No. 99 B. J. McLeod Motorsports ride, finishing 31st a lap down. He attempted the next seven races in the 03 but it was no use as the car was not high enough in owner points to make the field. In the Pit Boss 250, Lally would race Our's No. 23, as the 23 was locked into the field on owners points. Lally started 13th and finished 18th. Lally also attempted the next road course race, the B&L Transport 170, in the 23. He was running fourth on the closing lap when right in front of him, Riley Herbst wrecked Miguel Paludo down the straightaway. As Herbst had made contact with Lally coming to the white flag, Lally likely retaliated by wrecking Herbst. As he wrecked the 98, Brandon Jones passed him, leading him to finish fifth, tying his best career finish which he also scored at: Henry 180 in 2020, UNOH 188 in 2020, and the Mid-Ohio Challenge in 2017. In the 2021 edition of the Henry 180 at Road America, Natalie Decker was in the No. 23, and Lally returned to B. J. McLeod Motorsports. except this time driving the No. 5 with Alpha Prime sponsorship. Lally dodged chaos at the end of the race to finish 13th. After not attempting the Skrewball Peanut Butter Whiskey 200 at the Glen, the first road course race he did not attempt this year, Lally returned at the Pennzoil 150 again driving for McLeod, this time returning to the No. 78. Lally, partially due to strategy at the end of stage 2, finished fifth in that stage. Lally ended up finishing tenth, his best finish this year with McLeod. Lally then unexpectedly replaced Kyle Tilley in the Cup race there, who was also driving the No. 78 for McLeod. This was his first race in the NASCAR Cup Series since 2011.

In 2021, Lally was initially announced to drive all six road course races for Alpha Prime Racing in their number 44 car for the 2022 Xfinity Series Season. However, in January 2022, the team announced they had mutually parted ways with Lally.

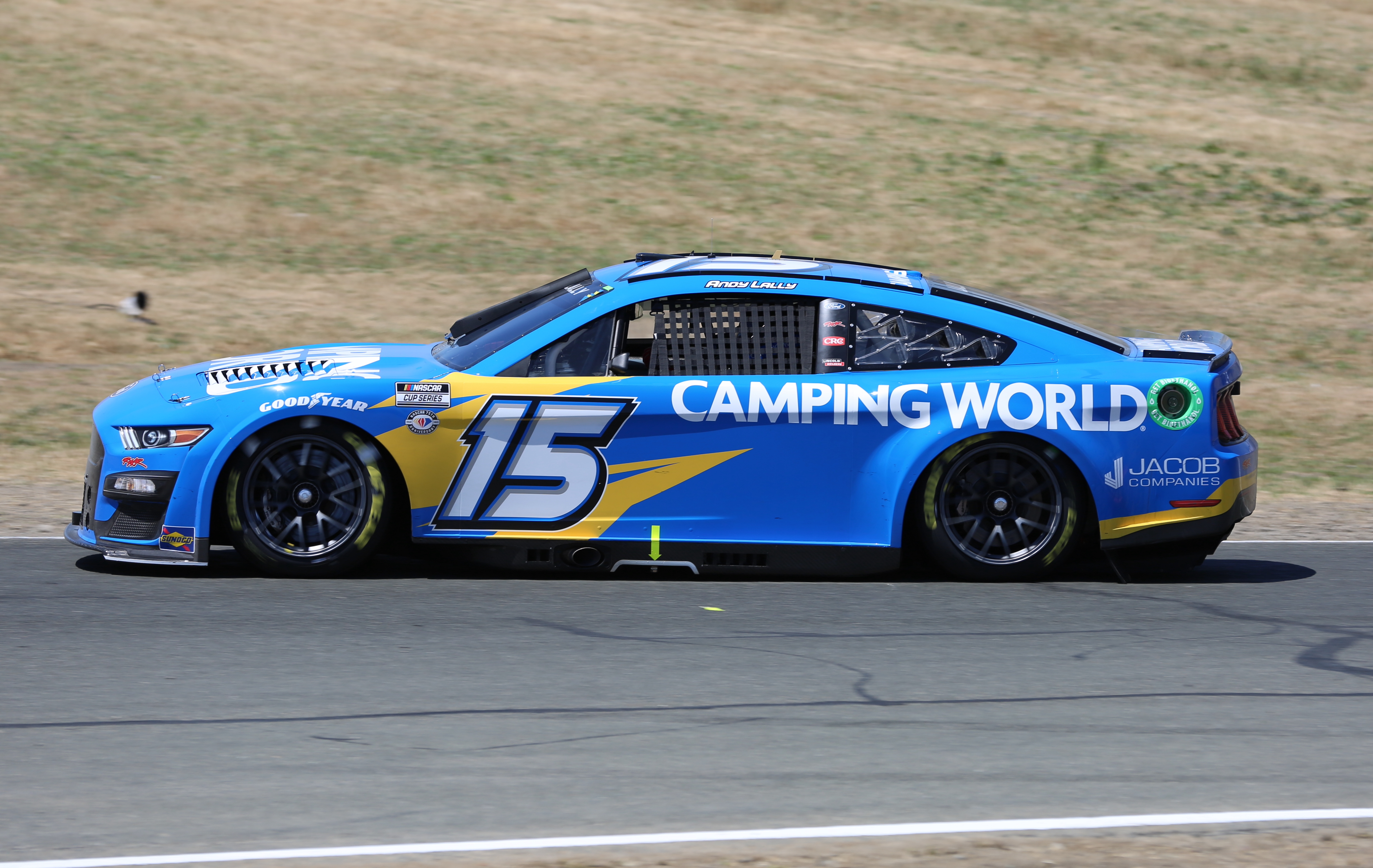
Andy Lally's No. 15 car at Sonoma.

In 2023, Lally returned to the Cup Series to race multiple races for the first time since he won Rookie of the Year. He drove both Rick Ware Racing cars, driving the No. 15 car at Sonoma, Watkins Glen, and the Charlotte Roval & the No. 51 car at the Chicago Street Course and the Indy Road Course.

=== Sports car racing ===
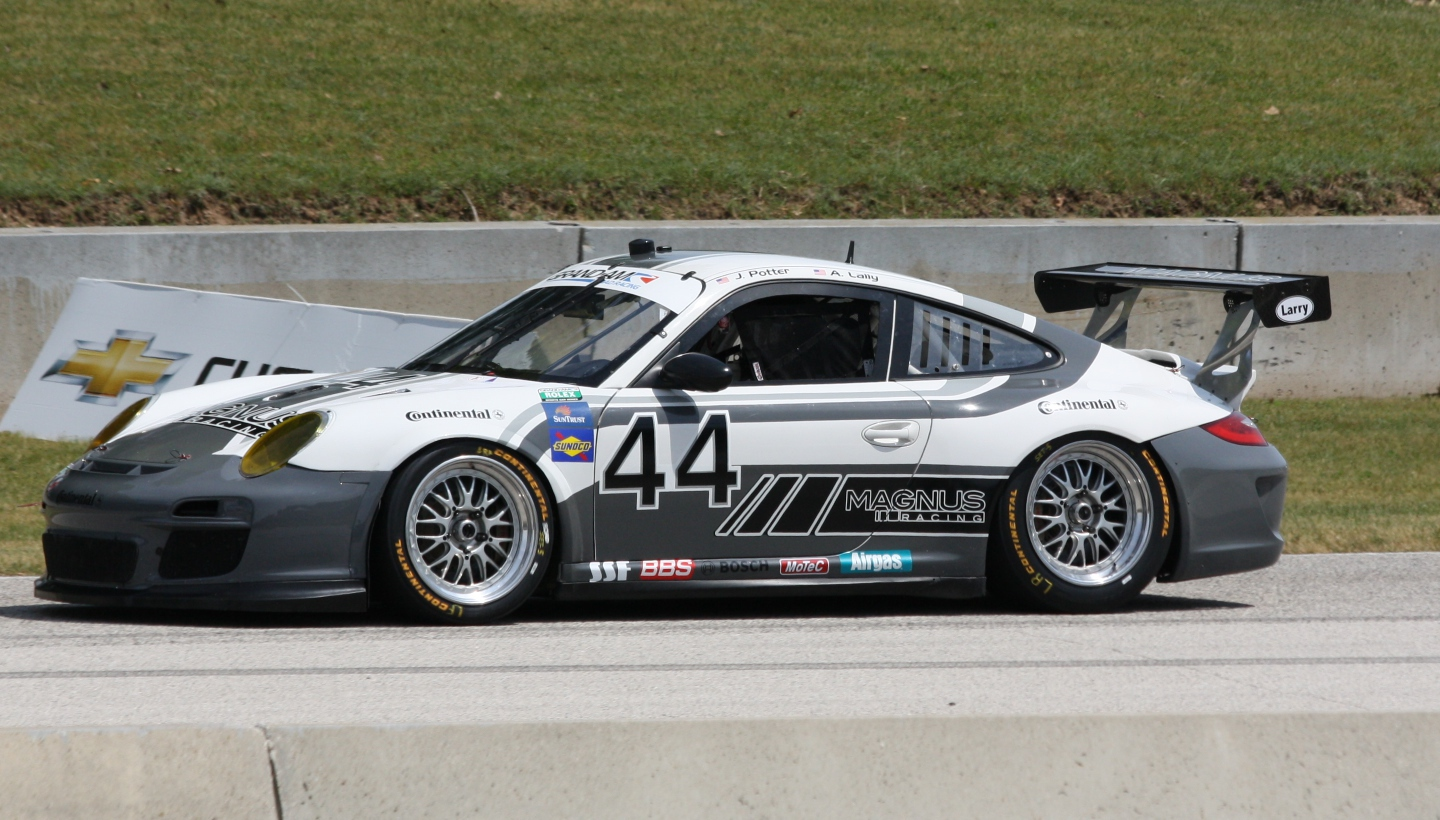
Lally's 2012 Magnus Racing Porsche

After winning Sunoco Rookie of the Year in the Sprint Cup Series, Lally returned to sports car racing for the 2012 season with thirty races planned across three series. He drove in the Grand-Am Road Racing Rolex Sports Car Series for Magnus Racing in the GT class, as well as a partial schedule in the ALMS and full schedule in the Continental Tire Series.

Lally won the 2012 24 Hours of Daytona GT division in a Magnus Racing Porsche 911 GT3 Cup with co-drivers Richard Lietz, René Rast and team owner John Potter. It marked Lally's fourth Rolex 24 class win and second consecutive. He won the 2016 24 Hours of Daytona in the GTD division once again with Magnus Racing for his fifth class win.

Lally joined Michael Shank Racing for the 2017 IMSA SportsCar Championship to drive an Acura NSX GT3.

== Personal life ==
Outside of auto racing, Lally is a World Championship street luge racer. After being No. 1 qualifier in two classes, Lally ended up winning the 2012 IGSA World Championships in both Street Luge and Classic Luge that took place in Calgary, Canada. In 2009, he was again No. 1 qualifier for both luge classes at the IGSA World Championships in Bathurst, Australia, and went on to his winning the World Championship in Classic luge and finish second in Street Luge.

Lally is a black belt in Brazilian jiu-jitsu under Paul Creighton and an avid mountain biker who competes in cross-country mountain bike racing. In 2009, he was part of a four-man team that won the 24 Hours of Big Bear in the Men's Sport division.

Lally is a vegan. During a visit to Farm Sanctuary in August 2011, he was quoted as saying: "I do it for ethical reasons. By this point in human evolution, we should be smart enough and kind enough to live without torturing other living beings just so we can enjoy lunch, especially when there are so many other great tasting options available."

== Motorsports career results ==
=== SCCA National Championship Runoffs ===
SCCA National Championship Runoffs
Year	Track	Car	Engine	Class	Finish	Start	Status
1995	Mid-Ohio	KBS Mk. 7		Formula 440	18	1	DNF
1996	Mid-Ohio	Van Diemen	Ford	Formula Continental	3	4	Running

=== American open-wheel racing ===
(key) (Races in bold indicate pole position, races in italics indicate fastest race lap)

==== Barber Dodge Pro Series ====
Barber Dodge Pro Series results
Year	1	2	3	4	5	6	7	8	9	10	11	12	Rank	Points
2000	SEB	MIA; 3	NAZ; 3	LRP; 2	DET; 11	CLE; 24	MOH; 5	ROA	VAN; 21	LS; 3	RAT	HMS	**11th**	**74**

==== Atlantic Championship ====
Toyota Atlantic results
Year	Team	1	2	3	4	5	6	7	8	9	10	11	12	Rank	Points
2000	World Speed Motorsports	HMS1	HMS2	LBH	MIL	MTL	CLE	TOR	TRR	ROA; 9	LS	GAT	HOU; 12	23rd	5

=== Sports car racing ===
==== Grand-Am Rolex Sports Car Series/IMSA WeatherTech SportsCar Championship results ====
(key)

Year	Team	Make	Engine	Class	1	2	3	4	5	6	7	8	9	10	11	12	13	14	15	Rank	Points
2004	TPC Racing	Porsche GT3 Cup		SGS	DAY; 2	HOM; 3	PHX; 3	CMT; 2	WAT; 1	DAY; 2	MOH; 2	WAT; 2	HOM; 8	VIR; 2	BAR; 1	CAL; 2				1st	377
2005	The Racer's Group	Pontiac GTO.R		GT	DAY; 5	HOM; 1	CAL; 2	LAG; 18	CMT; 13	WAT; 2	DAY; 20	BAR; 4	WAT; 4	MOH; 2	PHX; 4	WAT; 1	VIR; 3	MEX; 4		2nd	376
2006	The Racer's Group	Pontiac GTO.R		GT	DAY; 2	MEX; 3	HOM; 9	VIR; 1	LAG; 2	PHX; 2	LRP; 1	WAT; 4	MOH; 3	DAY; 1	BAR; 1	SON; 2	UTA; 1			1st	509
2007	The Racer's Group	Porsche 997 GT3 Cup		GT	DAY; 17	MEX; 8	HOM; 2	VIR; 10	LAG; 1	LRP; 10	WAT; 1	MOH; 1	DAY; 9	IOW; 1	BAR; 2	MON; 1			UTA; Ret	4th	348
2007	Howard Motorsports	Crawford	Porsche	DP													WAT; 13	SON		68th	18
2008	The Racer's Group	Porsche 997 GT3 Cup		GT	DAY; 2	HOM	MEX	VIR	LAG	LRP; 11	WAT	MOH; 4	DAY; 5	BAR; 3	MON; 6			NJ; 1	UTA; 3	15th	226
2008	Childress-Howard Motorsports	Crawford DP03	Pontiac 5.0L V8	DP												WAT; 19	SON			61st	12
2009	The Racer's Group	Porsche 997 GT3 Cup	Porsche 3.6L Flat-6	GT	DAY; 1	VIR; Ret	NJ; 4	LAG; 15	WAT; 13	MOH; 8	DAY; 3	BAR; 10	WAT; 6	MON; 2	UTA; 2	HOM; 12				6th	295
2010	The Racer's Group	Porsche 997 GT3 Cup	Porsche 3.6L Flat-6	GT	DAY; 3	HOM; 8		VIR; 1		WAT; 1		DAY; 1	NJ; 10	WAT; 9	MON					7th	281
2010	Matt Connolly Motorsports	Chevrolet Corvette C6	Chevrolet 5.7L V8	GT			BAR; Ret													7th	281
2010	Banner Racing	Chevrolet Corvette C6	Chevrolet 5.7L V8	GT					LRP; 5											7th	281
2010	Team Sahlen	Mazda RX-8	Mazda 2.0L 3-Rotor	GT							MOH; 8									7th	281
2010	Racers Edge Motorsports	Mazda RX-8	Mazda 2.0L 3-Rotor	GT												UTA; Ret				7th	281
2011	The Racer's Group	Porsche 997 GT3 Cup		GT	DAY; 1	HOM	BAR	VIR	LRP	WAT	ELK	LAG	NJ	WAT	MON; 15	MOH				33rd	51
2012	Magnus Racing	Porsche 997 GT3 Cup		GT	DAY; 1	BAR; 4	HOM; 7	NJ; 3	DET; 6	MOH; 5	ELK; Ret	WAT; Ret	IMS; 1	WAT; 4	MON; 11	LAG; 3	LRP; 6			7th	323
2013	Magnus Racing	Porsche 997 GT3 Cup		GT	DAY; 5	COA; 2	BAR; 6	ATL; 5	DET; 4	MOH; 2	WAT; 3	IMS; 3	ELK; 5	KAN; 8	LAG; 1	LRP; 13				2nd	331
2014	Magnus Racing	Porsche 911 GT America	Porsche 4.0 L Flat-6	GTD	DAY; 12	SEB; 1	LAG; 3	DET; 13	WGL; 3	MOS; 9	IMS; 12	ELK; 14	VIR; 6	COA; 2	PET; 3					8th	272
2015	Magnus Racing	Porsche 911 GT America	Porsche 4.0 L Flat-6	GTD	DAY; 11	SEB; 11	LAG; 6	DET; 7	WGL; 2	LIM; 5	ELK; 5	VIR; 9	COA; 12	PET; 2						8th	258
2016	Magnus Racing	Audi R8 LMS	Audi 5.2 L V10	GTD	DAY; 1	SEB; 3	LAG; 13	DET; 10	WGL; 2	MOS; 10	LIM; 1	ELK; 4	VIR; 3^{1}	COA; 4	PET; 12					7th	258
2017	Michael Shank Racing	Acura NSX GT3	Acura 3.5 L Turbo V6	GTD	DAY; 11	SEB; 14	LBH; 7	COA; 15	DET; 1	WGL; 1	MOS; 2	LIM; 5	ELK; 15	VIR; 15	LAG; 2	PET; 14				6th	286
2018	Magnus Racing	Audi R8 LMS	Audi 5.2 L V10	GTD	DAY; 6	SEB; 13	MOH; 10	DET; 10	WGL; 17	MOS; 3	LIM; 2	ELK; 9	VIR; 7	LAG; 5	PET; 9					8th	255
2019	Magnus Racing	Lamborghini Huracán GT3 Evo	Lamborghini 5.2 L V10	GTD	DAY; 10	SEB; 2	MOH; 8	BEL; 4	WGL; 7	MOS; 8	LIM; 8	ELK; 6	VIR; 6	LGA; 3	ATL; 8					4th	249
2020	GRT Magnus	Lamborghini Huracán GT3 Evo	Lamborghini 5.2 L V10	GTD	DAY; 2	DAY; 9	SEB; 10†	ELK; 8	VIR; 7	ATL; 12	MOH; 7	CLT; 11	PET; 3	LGA; 5	SEB; 7					9th	244
2021	Magnus Racing with Archangel Motorsports	Acura NSX GT3 Evo	Acura 3.5 L Turbo V6	GTD	DAY; 11	SEB; 4	MOH; 9	DET	WGL; 12	WGL	LIM; 13	ELK; 13	LGA; 9	LBH; 14	VIR; 14	PET; 6				11th	2228
2022	Magnus Racing	Aston Martin Vantage AMR GT3	Aston Martin 4.0 L Turbo V8	GTD	DAY; 2	SEB; 6	LBH	LGA	MOH	DET	WGL; 5	MOS	LIM	ELK	VIR; 12	PET; 14				17th	1284
2023	Magnus Racing	Aston Martin Vantage AMR GT3	Aston Martin 4.0 L Turbo V8	GTD	DAY; 2	SEB; 9	LBH	MON; 4	WGL; 9	MOS	LIM	ELK	VIR	IMS	PET; 17					20th	1264
2024	Magnus Racing	Aston Martin Vantage AMR GT3 Evo	Aston Martin 4.0 L Turbo V8	GTD	DAY; 23	SEB; 10	LBH	LGA	WGL; 3	MOS	ELK	VIR	IMS	PET						35th*	635*
2025	Magnus Racing	Aston Martin Vantage AMR GT3 Evo	Aston Martin 4.0 L Turbo V8	GTD	DAY; 21	SEB	LBH	LGA	WGL	MOS	ELK	VIR	IMS	PET						89th	119

^{†} Points only counted towards the WeatherTech Sprint Cup and not the overall GTD Championship. * Season still in progress

Notes

^{1} Disqualified for minimum ride height violation.

==== 24 Hours of Le Mans results ====
24 Hours of Le Mans results
Year	Team	Co-Drivers	Car	Class	Laps	Pos.	Class Pos.
2005	(United States) Miracle Motorsports	(United States) John Macaluso (United Kingdom) Ian James	Courage C65-AER	LMP2	115	DNF	DNF
2006	(United States) Miracle Motorsports	(United States) John Macaluso (United Kingdom) Ian James	Courage C65-AER	LMP2	324	14th	**3rd**

=== NASCAR ===
(key) (Bold – Pole position awarded by qualifying time. Italics – Pole position earned by points standings or practice time. * – Most laps led.)

==== Cup Series ====
NASCAR Cup Series results
Year	Team	No.	Make	1	2	3	4	5	6	7	8	9	10	11	12	13	14	15	16	17	18	19	20	21	22	23	24	25	26	27	28	29	30	31	32	33	34	35	36	NSCC	Pts	Ref
2009	TRG Motorsports	71	Chevy	DAY	CAL	LVS	ATL	BRI	MAR	TEX	PHO	TAL	RCH	DAR	CLT	DOV	POC	MCH	SON	NHA	DAY	CHI	IND	POC	GLN; 27	MCH	BRI	ATL	RCH	NHA	DOV	KAN	CAL	CLT	MAR	TAL	TEX	PHO	HOM	60th	82	
2010	TRG Motorsports	71	Chevy	DAY	CAL	LVS	ATL	BRI	MAR	PHO	TEX	TAL	RCH	DAR	DOV	CLT	POC	MCH	SON	NHA; 37	DAY	CHI	IND	POC	GLN; 18	MCH	BRI	ATL	RCH	NHA; 37	DOV	KAN	CAL; 36	CLT; 34	MAR	TAL	TEX; 34	PHO	HOM; 29	51st	471	
2011	TRG Motorsports	71	Chevy	DAY; 33	PHO; 31	LVS; 32	BRI; 32	CAL; 32	MAR																															33rd	398	
2011	TRG Motorsports	71	Ford							TEX; 32	TAL; 19	RCH; 26	DAR; DNQ	DOV; 33	CLT; DNQ	KAN; 31	POC; 32	MCH; 36	SON; 35	DAY; 27	KEN; 32	NHA; 28	IND; 26	POC; 29	GLN; 24	MCH; 29	BRI; 25	ATL; 30	RCH; 32	CHI; 28	NHA; 34	DOV; 33	KAN; 37		TAL; 39	MAR	TEX; 29	PHO; DNQ	HOM	33rd	398	
2011	TRG Motorsports	77	Ford																															CLT; 42						33rd	398	
2021	Live Fast Motorsports	78	Ford	DAY	DRC	HOM	LVS	PHO	ATL	BRD	MAR	RCH	TAL	KAN	DAR	DOV	COA	CLT	SON	NSH	POC	POC	ROA	ATL	NHA	GLN	IRC; 39	MCH	DAY	DAR	RCH	BRI	LVS	TAL	ROV	TEX	KAN	MAR	PHO	68th	0^{1}	
2022	Live Fast Motorsports	78	Ford	DAY	CAL	LVS	PHO	ATL	COA; 39	RCH	MAR	BRD	TAL	DOV	DAR	KAN	CLT	GTW	SON	NSH	ROA	ATL	NHA	POC	IRC	MCH	RCH	GLN	DAY	DAR	KAN	BRI	TEX	TAL	ROV	LVS	HOM	MAR	PHO	62nd	0^{1}	
2023	Rick Ware Racing	15	Ford	DAY	CAL	LVS	PHO	ATL	COA	RCH	BRD	MAR	TAL	DOV	KAN	DAR	CLT	GTW	SON; 35	NSH								GLN; 25	DAY	DAR	KAN	BRI	TEX	TAL	ROV; 35	LVS	HOM	MAR	PHO	54th	0^{1}	
2023	Rick Ware Racing	51	Ford																		CSC; 26	ATL	NHA	POC	RCH	MCH	IRC; 30													54th	0^{1}	

===== Daytona 500 =====
Year	Team	Manufacturer	Start	Finish
2011	TRG Motorsports	Chevrolet	37	33

==== Xfinity Series ====
NASCAR Xfinity Series results
Year	Team	No.	Make	1	2	3	4	5	6	7	8	9	10	11	12	13	14	15	16	17	18	19	20	21	22	23	24	25	26	27	28	29	30	31	32	33	34	35	NXSC	Pts	Ref
2007	Wood Brothers/JTG Racing	47	Ford	DAY	CAL	MXC	LVS	ATL	BRI	NSH	TEX	PHO	TAL	RCH	DAR	CLT	DOV	NSH	KEN	MLW	NHA	DAY	CHI	GTY	IRP	CGV; 29	GLN; 10	MCH	BRI	CAL	RCH	DOV	KAN	CLT	MEM	TEX	PHO	HOM	102nd	210	
2009	JD Motorsports	0	Chevy	DAY	CAL	LVS	BRI	TEX	NSH	PHO	TAL	RCH	DAR	CLT	DOV	NSH	KEN	MLW	NHA	DAY	CHI	GTY	IRP	IOW	GLN	MCH	BRI	CGV; 37	ATL	RCH	DOV	KAN	CAL	CLT	MEM	TEX	PHO	HOM	143rd	52	
2014	SS-Green Light Racing	55	Chevy	DAY	PHO	LVS	BRI	CAL	TEX	DAR	RCH	TAL	IOW	CLT	DOV	MCH	ROA; 7	KEN	DAY	NHA	CHI	IND	IOW	GLN	MOH	BRI	ATL	RCH	CHI	KEN	DOV	KAN	CLT	TEX	PHO	HOM			57th	37	
2015	SS-Green Light Racing	90	Chevy	DAY	ATL	LVS	PHO	CAL	TEX	BRI	RCH	TAL	IOW	CLT	DOV	MCH	CHI	DAY	KEN	NHA	IND	IOW	GLN	MOH; 21	BRI	ROA; 15	DAR	RCH	CHI	KEN	DOV	CLT	KAN	TEX	PHO	HOM			53rd	52	
2016	King Autosport	90	Chevy	DAY	ATL	LVS	PHO	CAL	TEX	BRI	RCH	TAL	DOV	CLT	POC	MCH	IOW	DAY	KEN	NHA	IND	IOW	GLN	MOH; 7	BRI	ROA	DAR	RCH	CHI	KEN	DOV	CLT	KAN	TEX	PHO	HOM			55th	35	
2017	SS-Green Light Racing	07	Chevy	DAY	ATL	LVS	PHO	CAL	TEX	BRI	RCH	TAL	CLT	DOV	POC	MCH	IOW	DAY	KEN	NHA	IND	IOW	GLN	MOH; 5	BRI	ROA	DAR	RCH	CHI	KEN	DOV	CLT	KAN	TEX	PHO	HOM			50th	38	
2018	DGM Racing	90	Chevy	DAY	ATL	LVS	PHO	CAL	TEX	BRI	RCH	TAL	DOV	CLT	POC	MCH	IOW	CHI	DAY	KEN	NHA	IOW	GLN	MOH; 15	BRI	ROA; 10	DAR	IND	LVS	RCH	ROV; 37	DOV	KAN	TEX	PHO	HOM			46th	60	
2020	Our Motorsports	02	Chevy	DAY	LVS	CAL	PHO	DAR	CLT	BRI	ATL	HOM	HOM	TAL	POC	IRC	KEN	KEN	TEX	KAN	ROA; 5	DRC; 5	DOV	DOV	DAY	DAR	RCH	RCH	BRI	LVS	TAL	ROV	KAN	TEX	MAR	PHO			42nd	83	
2021	Our Motorsports	03	Chevy	DAY	DRC; DNQ		LVS; DNQ	PHO; DNQ	ATL; DNQ	MAR; DNQ	TAL; DNQ	DAR; DNQ	DOV; DNQ																										35th	127	
2021	B. J. McLeod Motorsports	99	Chevy		DRC; 31	HOM																																	35th	127	
2021	Our Motorsports	23	Chevy											COA; 18	CLT	MOH; 5	TEX	NSH	POC																				35th	127	
2021	B. J. McLeod Motorsports	5	Chevy																	ROA; 13	ATL	NHA	GLN																35th	127	
2021	B. J. McLeod Motorsports	78	Chevy																					IRC; 10	MCH	DAY	DAR	RCH	BRI	LVS	TAL	ROV	TEX	KAN	MAR	PHO			35th	127	
2022	Alpha Prime Racing	44	Chevy	DAY	CAL	LVS	PHO	ATL	COA	RCH	MAR	TAL	DOV	DAR	TEX	CLT	PIR; 17	NSH																					45th	89	
2022	SS-Green Light Racing	08	Ford																ROA; 14	ATL	NHA	POC	IRC; 25	MCH	GLN; 19	DAY	DAR	KAN	BRI	TEX	TAL	ROV; 31	LVS	HOM	MAR	PHO			45th	89	
2023	Peterson Racing Group	87	Chevy	DAY	CAL	LVS	PHO	ATL	COA	RCH	MAR	TAL	DOV	DAR	CLT	PIR	SON	NSH	CSC	ATL	NHA	POC	ROA	MCH	IRC	GLN	DAY	DAR	KAN	BRI	TEX	ROV; DNQ	LVS	HOM	MAR	PHO			N/A	0	

^{*} Season still in progress

==== Camping World Truck Series ====
NASCAR Camping World Truck Series results
Year	Team	No.	Make	1	2	3	4	5	6	7	8	9	10	11	12	13	14	15	16	17	18	19	20	21	22	23	24	25	NCWTC	Pts	Ref
2007	TRG Motorsports	00	Toyota	DAY	CAL	ATL	MAR	KAN	CLT	MFD	DOV	TEX	MCH	MLW	MEM	KEN	IRP	NSH	BRI	GTW	NHA	LVS	TAL	MAR	ATL	TEX; 22	PHO; 31	HOM; 33	67th	231	
2008	TRG Motorsports	7	Chevy	DAY; 11	CAL; 29	ATL; 22	MAR; 36	KAN; 29	CLT; 16	MFD; 14	DOV; 22	TEX	MCH	MLW	MEM	KEN	IRP	NSH	BRI										32nd	870	
2008	TRG Motorsports	71	Chevy																	GTW; 20	NHA	LVS	TAL	MAR	ATL	TEX	PHO	HOM	32nd	870	
2009	FDNY Racing	28	Chevy	DAY; DNQ	CAL	ATL	MAR	KAN	CLT	DOV	TEX	MCH	MLW	MEM	KEN	IRP	NSH	BRI	CHI	IOW	GTW	NHA	LVS	MAR	TAL; 26	TEX	PHO	HOM	93rd	85	
2010	FDNY Racing	28	Chevy	DAY	ATL	MAR	NSH	KAN	DOV	CLT	TEX	MCH	IOW	GTY	IRP	POC	NSH	DAR	BRI	CHI	KEN	NHA	LVS	MAR	TAL; 20	TEX	PHO	HOM	96th	103	

==== Goody's Dash Series ====
NASCAR Goody's Dash Series results
Year	Team	No.	Make	1	2	3	4	5	6	7	8	9	10	11	12	13	14	15	16	17	18	NGDS	Pts	Ref
2001	N/A	12	Pontiac	DAY; 26	ROU	DAR	CLT	LOU	JAC	KEN	SBO	DAY	GRE	SNM	NRV	MYB	BRI	ACE	JAC	USA	NSH	73rd	85	

=== ARCA Re/Max Series ===
(key) (Bold – Pole position awarded by qualifying time. Italics – Pole position earned by points standings or practice time. * – Most laps led.)

ARCA Re/Max Series results
Year	Team	No.	Make	1	2	3	4	5	6	7	8	9	10	11	12	13	14	15	16	17	18	19	20	21	22	23	ARMSC	Pts	Ref
2007	TRG Motorsports	87	Chevy	DAY	USA	NSH	SLM	KAN	WIN	KEN	TOL	IOW	POC	MCH	BLN	KEN	POC	NSH	ISF	MIL; 10	GTW; 7	DSF	CHI; 12	SLM	TAL	TOL	53rd	545	
2008	TRG Motorsports	48	Chevy	DAY	SLM	IOW	KEN	CAR	KEN	TOL	POC	MCH	CAY	KEN	BLN	POC	NSH	ISF	DSF	CHI	SLM	**NJE**; 4	TAL	TOL			84th	235	

Achievements
Preceded by Kevin Conway	NASCAR Sprint Cup Series Rookie of the Year; 2011	Succeeded by Stephen Leicht
