= 2021 Verizon 200 at the Brickyard =

NASCAR Cup Series race

Race details
- Race 24 of 36 in the 2021 NASCAR Cup Series
- Date: August 15, 2021
- Location: Indianapolis Motor Speedway in Speedway, Indiana
- Course: Permanent racing facility
- Course length: 2.439 miles (3.925 km)
- Distance: 95 laps, 231.705 mi (372.893 km)
- Scheduled distance: 82 laps, 199.998 mi (321.866 km)
- Average speed: 69.171 miles per hour (111.320 km/h)

Pole position
Driver	William Byron	Hendrick Motorsports
- Time: 1:27.765

Most laps led
Driver	Kyle Larson	Hendrick Motorsports
- Laps: 28

Winner
No. 16	A. J. Allmendinger	Kaulig Racing

Television in the United States
- Network: NBC / NBCSN (Laps 93-95)
- Announcers: Rick Allen, Steve Letarte (booth), Mike Bagley (Turn 1), Dale Earnhardt Jr. (Turn 7) and Jeff Burton (Turn 12)

Radio in the United States
- Radio: Performance Racing Network; Indianapolis Motor Speedway Radio Network
- Booth announcers: Doug Rice, Pat Patterson and Jeff Hammond
- Turn announcers: Nick Yeoman (Turns 1–4), Mark Jaynes (Turns 5–9), Chris Denari (Turns 10–11) and Jake Query (Turns 12–14)

The 2021 Verizon 200 at the Brickyard was a NASCAR Cup Series race that was held on August 15, 2021, at Indianapolis Motor Speedway in Speedway, Indiana. It was the inaugural running of the Verizon 200 on the road course, and officially the 28th edition of NASCAR at the Speedway. Contested over 95 laps—extended from 82 laps due to an overtime finish, on the 2.439-mile (3.925 km) road course, it was the 24th race of the 2021 NASCAR Cup Series season.

This race marked the first time a NASCAR Cup Series race was contested on the infield road course after the 2020 Xfinity Series race was held there the previous year as part of the INDYCAR/NASCAR doubleheader.

A. J. Allmendinger earned his first victory since 2014, as well as his second career NASCAR Cup Series victory, and the race also marked the first career NASCAR Cup Series victory for Kaulig Racing.

== Report ==
=== Background ===
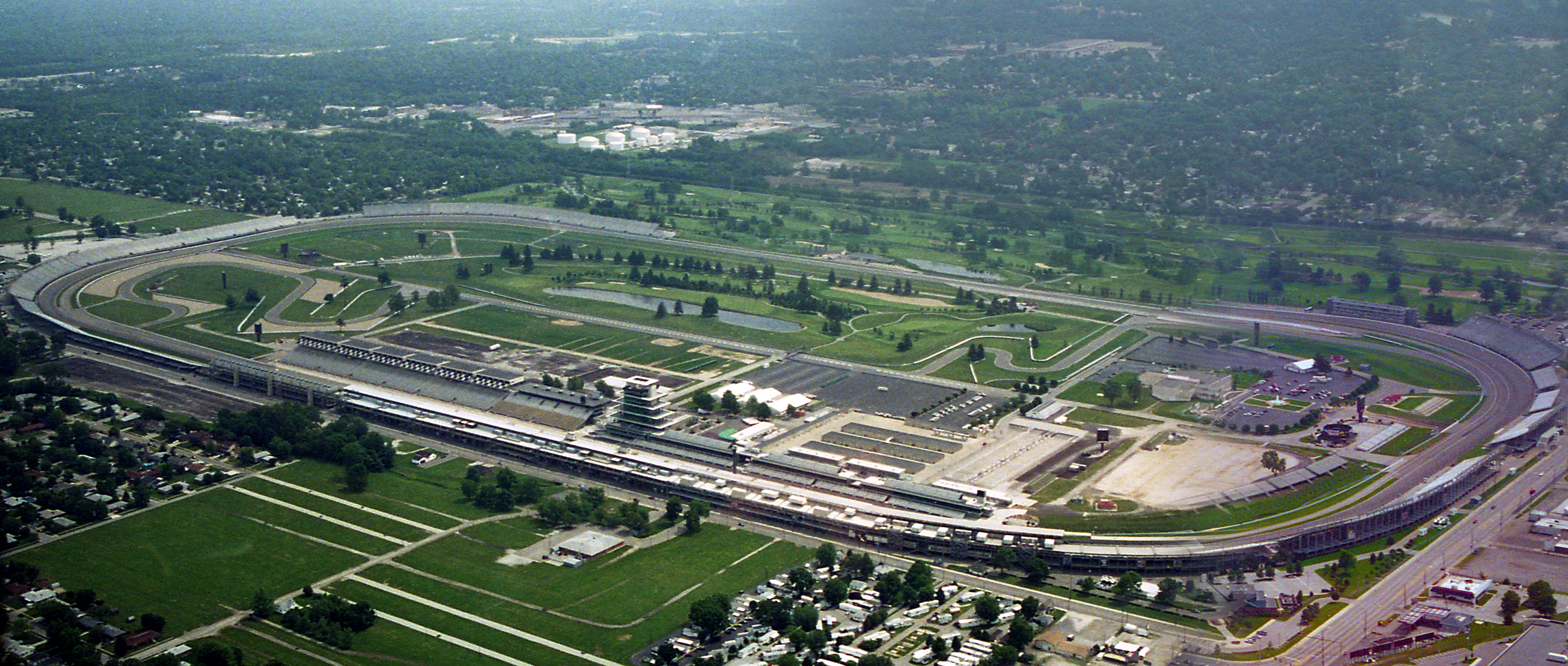
Indianapolis Motor Speedway, the track where the race was held.

The Indianapolis Motor Speedway, located in Speedway, Indiana, (an enclave suburb of Indianapolis) in the United States, is the home of the Indianapolis 500 and the Brickyard 400. It is located on the corner of 16th Street and Georgetown Road, approximately six miles (10 km) west of Downtown Indianapolis.

Constructed in 1909, it is the original speedway, the first racing facility so named. It has a permanent seating capacity estimated at 235,000 with infield seating raising capacity to an approximate 400,000. It is the highest-capacity sports venue in the world.

After running the support races last year on the road course, the Speedway moved the Cup Series feature division to the road course configuration. As a result, the July 4 weekend spot it held was occupied by Road America and the race was moved to mid-August. As was the case during the pandemic-affected 2020 season, the NTT IndyCar Series will race on the Saturday card with the Big Machine Spiked Coolers Grand Prix. The events were part of four different divisions of racing within a week at the Speedway, with the Bryan Clauson Classic midget car events at the Speedway the next week.

The 2021 Verizon 200 at the Brickyard program cover, which includes the ensuing week's Bryan Clauson Classic on the dirt track.

Prior to the race, NASCAR had the rumble strip on turn 6 removed after it caused severe damage to several cars during the first lap of the Xfinity race the day before.

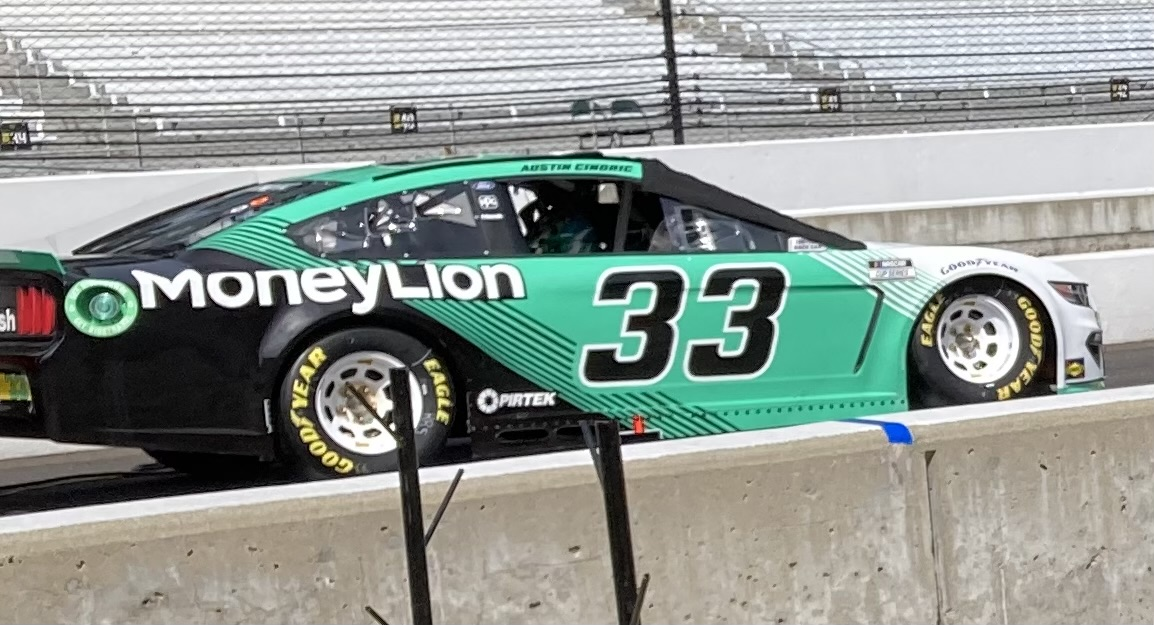
Austin Cindric's #33 MoneyLion Ford before the race

==== Entry list ====
- (R) denotes rookie driver.
- (i) denotes driver who are ineligible for series driver points.

No.	Driver	Team	Manufacturer
00	Quin Houff	StarCom Racing	Chevrolet
1	Kurt Busch	Chip Ganassi Racing	Chevrolet
2	Brad Keselowski	Team Penske	Ford
3	Austin Dillon	Richard Childress Racing	Chevrolet
4	Kevin Harvick	Stewart-Haas Racing	Ford
5	Kyle Larson	Hendrick Motorsports	Chevrolet
6	Ryan Newman	Roush Fenway Racing	Ford
7	Corey LaJoie	Spire Motorsports	Chevrolet
8	Tyler Reddick	Richard Childress Racing	Chevrolet
9	Chase Elliott	Hendrick Motorsports	Chevrolet
10	Aric Almirola	Stewart-Haas Racing	Ford
11	Denny Hamlin	Joe Gibbs Racing	Toyota
12	Ryan Blaney	Team Penske	Ford
14	Chase Briscoe (R)	Stewart-Haas Racing	Ford
15	James Davison	Rick Ware Racing	Chevrolet
16	A. J. Allmendinger (i)	Kaulig Racing	Chevrolet
17	Chris Buescher	Roush Fenway Racing	Ford
18	Kyle Busch	Joe Gibbs Racing	Toyota
19	Martin Truex Jr.	Joe Gibbs Racing	Toyota
20	Christopher Bell	Joe Gibbs Racing	Toyota
21	Matt DiBenedetto	Wood Brothers Racing	Ford
22	Joey Logano	Team Penske	Ford
23	Bubba Wallace	23XI Racing	Toyota
24	William Byron	Hendrick Motorsports	Chevrolet
33	Austin Cindric (i)	Team Penske	Ford
34	Michael McDowell	Front Row Motorsports	Ford
37	Ryan Preece	JTG Daugherty Racing	Chevrolet
38	Anthony Alfredo (R)	Front Row Motorsports	Ford
41	Cole Custer	Stewart-Haas Racing	Ford
42	Ross Chastain	Chip Ganassi Racing	Chevrolet
43	Erik Jones	Richard Petty Motorsports	Chevrolet
47	Ricky Stenhouse Jr.	JTG Daugherty Racing	Chevrolet
48	Alex Bowman	Hendrick Motorsports	Chevrolet
51	Cody Ware (i)	Petty Ware Racing	Chevrolet
52	Josh Bilicki	Rick Ware Racing	Ford
53	Garrett Smithley (i)	Rick Ware Racing	Ford
66	Timmy Hill (i)	MBM Motorsports	Toyota
77	Justin Haley (i)	Spire Motorsports	Chevrolet
78	Andy Lally (i)	Live Fast Motorsports	Ford
99	Daniel Suárez	Trackhouse Racing Team	Chevrolet
Official entry list

== Practice ==
Martin Truex Jr. was the fastest in the practice session with a time of 1:29.577 and a speed of 98.021 mph (157.750 km/h).

=== Practice results ===
Pos	No.	Driver	Team	Manufacturer	Time	Speed
1	19	Martin Truex Jr.	Joe Gibbs Racing	Toyota	1:29.577	98.021
2	24	William Byron	Hendrick Motorsports	Chevrolet	1:30.067	97.487
3	5	Kyle Larson	Hendrick Motorsports	Chevrolet	1:30.106	97.445
Official practice results

== Qualifying ==
William Byron scored the pole for the race with a time of 1:27.765 and a speed of 100.044 mph (161.005 km/h).

Byron was the only driver in the 1:27 range during the entire event, and the first NASCAR race car to exceed 100 MPH average speed on the road course.

=== Qualifying results ===
Pos	No.	Driver	Team	Manufacturer	R1	R2
1	24	William Byron	Hendrick Motorsports	Chevrolet	1:28.148	1:27.765
2	14	Chase Briscoe (R)	Stewart-Haas Racing	Ford	1:28.034	1:28.191
3	9	Chase Elliott	Hendrick Motorsports	Chevrolet	1:28.318	1:28.229
4	5	Kyle Larson	Hendrick Motorsports	Chevrolet	1:27.931	1:28.305
5	99	Daniel Suárez	Trackhouse Racing Team	Chevrolet	1:28.327	1:28.431
6	19	Martin Truex Jr.	Joe Gibbs Racing	Toyota	1:28.148	1:28.502
7	22	Joey Logano	Team Penske	Ford	1:28.271	1:28.511
8	16	A. J. Allmendinger (i)	Kaulig Racing	Chevrolet	1:28.144	1:28.518
9	42	Ross Chastain	Chip Ganassi Racing	Chevrolet	1:28.288	1:28.562
10	41	Cole Custer	Stewart-Haas Racing	Ford	1:28.225	1:28.562
11	8	Tyler Reddick	Richard Childress Racing	Chevrolet	1:28.248	1:28.596
12	34	Michael McDowell	Front Row Motorsports	Ford	1:28.295	1:29.302
13	33	Austin Cindric (i)	Team Penske	Ford	1:28.359	—
14	11	Denny Hamlin	Joe Gibbs Racing	Toyota	1:28.400	—
15	21	Matt DiBenedetto	Wood Brothers Racing	Ford	1:28.414	—
16	12	Ryan Blaney	Team Penske	Ford	1:28.591	—
17	20	Christopher Bell	Joe Gibbs Racing	Toyota	1:28.727	—
18	10	Aric Almirola	Stewart-Haas Racing	Ford	1:28.762	—
19	17	Chris Buescher	Roush Fenway Racing	Ford	1:28.811	—
20	1	Kurt Busch	Chip Ganassi Racing	Chevrolet	1:28.812	—
21	18	Kyle Busch	Joe Gibbs Racing	Toyota	1:28.818	—
22	47	Ricky Stenhouse Jr.	JTG Daugherty Racing	Chevrolet	1:28.970	—
23	3	Austin Dillon	Richard Childress Racing	Chevrolet	1:29.017	—
24	48	Alex Bowman	Hendrick Motorsports	Chevrolet	1:29.026	—
25	4	Kevin Harvick	Stewart-Haas Racing	Ford	1:29.071	—
26	7	Corey LaJoie	Spire Motorsports	Chevrolet	1:29.074	—
27	23	Bubba Wallace	23XI Racing	Toyota	1:29.278	—
28	43	Erik Jones	Richard Petty Motorsports	Chevrolet	1:29.318	—
29	77	Justin Haley (i)	Spire Motorsports	Chevrolet	1:29.410	—
30	37	Ryan Preece	JTG Daugherty Racing	Chevrolet	1:29.544	—
31	2	Brad Keselowski	Team Penske	Ford	1:29.577	—
32	6	Ryan Newman	Roush Fenway Racing	Ford	1:29.639	—
33	38	Anthony Alfredo (R)	Front Row Motorsports	Ford	1:29.640	—
34	15	James Davison	Rick Ware Racing	Chevrolet	1:29.976	—
35	78	Andy Lally (i)	Live Fast Motorsports	Ford	1:30.345	—
36	52	Josh Bilicki	Rick Ware Racing	Ford	1:31.203	—
37	51	Cody Ware (i)	Petty Ware Racing	Chevrolet	1:31.656	—
38	00	Quin Houff	StarCom Racing	Chevrolet	1:31.837	—
39	53	Garrett Smithley (i)	Rick Ware Racing	Ford	1:31.865	—
40	66	Timmy Hill (i)	MBM Motorsports	Toyota	1:32.691	—
Official qualifying results

== Race ==
=== Stage Results ===
Stage One Laps: 15

Pos	No	Driver	Team	Manufacturer	Points
1	8	Tyler Reddick	Richard Childress Racing	Chevrolet	10
2	34	Michael McDowell	Front Row Motorsports	Ford	9
3	3	Austin Dillon	Richard Childress Racing	Chevrolet	8
4	43	Erik Jones	Richard Petty Motorsports	Chevrolet	7
5	37	Ryan Preece	JTG Daugherty Racing	Chevrolet	6
6	2	Brad Keselowski	Team Penske	Ford	5
7	47	Ricky Stenhouse Jr.	JTG Daugherty Racing	Chevrolet	4
8	77	Justin Haley (i)	Spire Motorsports	Chevrolet	0
9	14	Chase Briscoe (R)	Stewart-Haas Racing	Ford	2
10	9	Chase Elliott	Hendrick Motorsports	Chevrolet	1
Official stage one results

Stage Two Laps: 20

Pos	No	Driver	Team	Manufacturer	Points
1	8	Tyler Reddick	Richard Childress Racing	Chevrolet	10
2	3	Austin Dillon	Richard Childress Racing	Chevrolet	9
3	37	Ryan Preece	JTG Daugherty Racing	Chevrolet	8
4	47	Ricky Stenhouse Jr.	JTG Daugherty Racing	Chevrolet	7
5	21	Matt DiBenedetto	Wood Brothers Racing	Ford	6
6	77	Justin Haley (i)	Spire Motorsports	Chevrolet	0
7	7	Corey LaJoie	Spire Motorsports	Chevrolet	4
8	78	Andy Lally (i)	Live Fast Motorsports	Ford	0
9	5	Kyle Larson	Hendrick Motorsports	Chevrolet	2
10	9	Chase Elliott	Hendrick Motorsports	Chevrolet	1
Official stage two results

=== Final Stage Results ===
Stage Three Laps: 47

After finishing third and Hamlin finishing twenty-third, Larson took the lead in the regular-season points standings. Hamlin however was able to officially qualify in the Cup Playoffs based on points.

Pos	Grid	No	Driver	Team	Manufacturer	Laps	Points
1	8	16	A. J. Allmendinger (i)	Kaulig Racing	Chevrolet	95	0
2	16	12	Ryan Blaney	Team Penske	Ford	95	35
3	4	5	Kyle Larson	Hendrick Motorsports	Chevrolet	95	36
4	3	9	Chase Elliott	Hendrick Motorsports	Chevrolet	95	35
5	15	21	Matt DiBenedetto	Wood Brothers Racing	Ford	95	38
6	20	1	Kurt Busch	Chip Ganassi Racing	Chevrolet	95	31
7	28	43	Erik Jones	Richard Petty Motorsports	Chevrolet	95	37
8	29	77	Justin Haley (i)	Spire Motorsports	Chevrolet	95	0
9	13	33	Austin Cindric (i)	Team Penske	Ford	95	0
10	32	6	Ryan Newman	Roush Fenway Racing	Ford	95	27
11	22	47	Ricky Stenhouse Jr.	JTG Daugherty Racing	Chevrolet	95	37
12	19	17	Chris Buescher	Roush Fenway Racing	Ford	95	25
13	27	23	Bubba Wallace	23XI Racing	Toyota	95	24
14	25	4	Kevin Harvick	Stewart-Haas Racing	Ford	95	23
15	6	19	Martin Truex Jr.	Joe Gibbs Racing	Toyota	95	22
16	26	7	Corey LaJoie	Spire Motorsports	Chevrolet	95	25
17	24	48	Alex Bowman	Hendrick Motorsports	Chevrolet	95	20
18	36	52	Josh Bilicki	Rick Ware Racing	Ford	95	19
19	18	10	Aric Almirola	Stewart-Haas Racing	Ford	95	18
20	21	18	Kyle Busch	Joe Gibbs Racing	Toyota	95	17
21	11	8	Tyler Reddick	Richard Childress Racing	Chevrolet	95	36
22	38	00	Quin Houff	StarCom Racing	Chevrolet	95	15
23	14	11	Denny Hamlin	Joe Gibbs Racing	Toyota	95	14
24	31	2	Brad Keselowski	Team Penske	Ford	95	18
25	10	41	Cole Custer	Stewart-Haas Racing	Ford	94	12
26	2	14	Chase Briscoe (R)	Stewart-Haas Racing	Ford	94	13
27	40	66	Timmy Hill (i)	MBM Motorsports	Toyota	94	0
28	39	53	Garrett Smithley (i)	Rick Ware Racing	Ford	94	0
29	9	42	Ross Chastain	Chip Ganassi Racing	Chevrolet	93	8
30	12	34	Michael McDowell	Front Row Motorsports	Ford	88	16
31	23	3	Austin Dillon	Richard Childress Racing	Chevrolet	88	23
32	34	15	James Davison	Rick Ware Racing	Chevrolet	80	5
33	1	24	William Byron	Hendrick Motorsports	Chevrolet	77	4
34	7	22	Joey Logano	Team Penske	Ford	77	3
35	30	37	Ryan Preece	JTG Daugherty Racing	Chevrolet	77	16
36	17	20	Christopher Bell	Joe Gibbs Racing	Toyota	77	1
37	5	99	Daniel Suárez	Trackhouse Racing Team	Chevrolet	77	1
38	33	38	Anthony Alfredo (R)	Front Row Motorsports	Ford	68	1
39	35	78	Andy Lally (i)	Live Fast Motorsports	Ford	55	0
40	37	51	Cody Ware (i)	Petty Ware Racing	Chevrolet	46	0
Official race results

=== Race statistics ===
- Lead changes: 13 among 11 different drivers
- Cautions/Laps: 6 for 25
- Red flags: 2 for 23 minutes and 22 seconds
- Time of race: 3 hours, 20 minutes and 59 seconds
- Average speed: 69.171 miles per hour (111.320 km/h)

== Media ==
=== Television ===
NBC Sports covered the race on the television side as part of a Radio Style Broadcast for the race. Rick Allen, and Steve Letarte called the race from the broadcast booth. MRN broadcaster Mike Bagley called the race from Turn 1, Dale Earnhardt Jr. had the call from Turn 7, and Jeff Burton had the call from Turn 12. Dave Burns, Marty Snider, and Kelli Stavast handled the pit road duties from pit lane. Rutledge Wood handled the features from the track.

NBC
Booth announcers	Turn Announcers	Pit reporters	Features reporter
Lap-by-lap: Rick Allen; Color-commentator: Steve Letarte	Turn 1 Announcer: Mike Bagley; Turn 7 Announcer: Dale Earnhardt Jr. Turn 12 Announcer: Jeff Burton	Dave Burns; Marty Snider; Kelli Stavast	Rutledge Wood

=== Radio ===
Indianapolis Motor Speedway Radio Network and the Performance Racing Network jointly co-produced the radio broadcast for the race, which was simulcast on Sirius XM NASCAR Radio, and aired on IMS or PRN stations, depending on contractual obligations. The lead announcers and two pit reporters were PRN staff, while the turns announcers and two pit reporters were from IMS.

PRN/IMS Radio
Booth announcers	Turn announcers	Pit reporters
Lead announcer: Doug Rice; Announcer: Pat Patterson; Announcer: Jeff Hammond	Turns 1–4: Nick Yeoman; Turns 5–9: Mark Jaynes; Turns 10–11: Chris Denari; Turns 12–14: Jake Query	Brad Gillie; Brett McMillan; Ryan Myrehn; Michael Young

== Standings after the race ==
Drivers' Championship standings

	Pos	Driver	Points
	1	Kyle Larson	953
	2	Denny Hamlin	931 (–22)
1	3	Kyle Busch	796 (–157)
1	4	William Byron	790 (–163)
1	5	Chase Elliott	774 (–179)
1	6	Joey Logano	763 (–190)
	7	Martin Truex Jr.	762 (–191)
	8	Ryan Blaney	747 (–206)
	9	Kevin Harvick	733 (–220)
	10	Brad Keselowski	696 (–257)
1	11	Tyler Reddick	666 (–287)
1	12	Alex Bowman	653 (–300)
	13	Austin Dillon	638 (–315)
	14	Kurt Busch	607 (–346)
	15	Christopher Bell	562 (–391)
1	16	Matt DiBenedetto	521 (–432)
Official driver's standings

Manufacturers' Championship standings

	Pos	Manufacturer	Points
	1	Chevrolet	892
1	2	Ford	822 (–70)
1	3	Toyota	813 (–79)

- Note: Only the first 16 positions are included for the driver standings.
- . – Driver has clinched a position in the NASCAR Cup Series playoffs.

Previous race: 2021 Go Bowling at The Glen	NASCAR Cup Series; 2021 season	Next race: 2021 FireKeepers Casino 400
