= 2021 Coke Zero Sugar 400 =

NASCAR Cup Series race

Race details
- Race 26 of 36 in the 2021 NASCAR Cup Series
- Date: August 28, 2021
- Location: Daytona International Speedway in Daytona Beach, Florida
- Course: Permanent racing facility
- Course length: 2.5 miles (4.023 km)
- Distance: 165 laps, 412.5 mi (663.854 km)
- Scheduled distance: 160 laps, 400 mi (643.738 km)
- Average speed: 142.201 miles per hour (228.850 km/h)

Pole position
| Driver | Kyle Larson | Hendrick Motorsports |
- Grid positions set by competition-based formula

Most laps led
| Driver | Joey Logano | Team Penske |
- Laps: 37

Winner
| No. 12 | Ryan Blaney | Team Penske |

Television in the United States
- Network: NBC
- Announcers: Rick Allen, Jeff Burton, Steve Letarte and Dale Earnhardt Jr.

Radio in the United States
- Radio: MRN
- Booth announcers: Alex Hayden and Jeff Striegle
- Turn announcers: Dave Moody (1 & 2), Mike Bagley (Backstretch) and Kyle Rickey (3 & 4)

The 2021 Coke Zero Sugar 400 was a NASCAR Cup Series race held on August 28, 2021, at Daytona International Speedway in Daytona Beach, Florida. Contested over 165 laps—extended from 160 laps due to an overtime finish, on the 2.5-mile (4.0 km) superspeedway, it was the 26th race of the 2021 NASCAR Cup Series season, and the final race of the regular season before the playoffs.

Ryan Blaney won an incident-filled race in overtime, while Tyler Reddick, who finished in fifth place, secured the final spot in the playoffs.

== Report ==
=== Background ===
Daytona International Speedway, the site of the race.

The race was held at Daytona International Speedway, a race track located in Daytona Beach, Florida, United States. Since its opening in 1959, the track has been the home of the Daytona 500, the most prestigious race in NASCAR. In addition to NASCAR, the track also hosts ARCA, AMA Superbike, USCC, SCCA, and Motocross races. It features multiple layouts including the primary 2.5 miles (4.0 km) high speed tri-oval, a 3.56 miles (5.73 km) sports car course, a 2.95 miles (4.75 km) motorcycle course, and a .25 miles (0.40 km) karting and motorcycle flat-track. The track's 180-acre (73 ha) infield includes the 29-acre (12 ha) Lake Lloyd, which has hosted powerboat racing. The speedway is owned and operated by International Speedway Corporation.

The track was built in 1959 by NASCAR founder William "Bill" France, Sr. to host racing held at the former Daytona Beach Road Course. His banked design permitted higher speeds and gave fans a better view of the cars. Lights were installed around the track in 1998 and today, it is the third-largest single lit outdoor sports facility. The speedway has been renovated three times, with the infield renovated in 2004 and the track repaved twice — in 1978 and in 2010.

The 2021 Coke Zero Sugar 400 program cover.

On January 22, 2013, the track unveiled artist depictions of a renovated speedway. On July 5 of that year, ground was broken for a project that would remove the backstretch seating and completely redevelop the frontstretch seating. The renovation to the speedway was done by Rossetti Architects. The project, named "Daytona Rising", was completed in January 2016, at a cost of US $400 million, placing emphasis on improving fan experience with five expanded and redesigned fan entrances (called "injectors") as well as wider and more comfortable seating with more restrooms and concession stands. After the renovations, the track's grandstands included 101,000 permanent seats with the ability to increase permanent seating to 125,000. The project was completed before the start of Speedweeks.

==== Entry list ====
- (R) denotes rookie driver.
- (i) denotes driver who are ineligible for series driver points.

| No. | Driver | Team | Manufacturer |
|---|---|---|---|
| 00 | Quin Houff | StarCom Racing | Chevrolet |
| 1 | Kurt Busch | Chip Ganassi Racing | Chevrolet |
| 2 | Brad Keselowski | Team Penske | Ford |
| 3 | Austin Dillon | Richard Childress Racing | Chevrolet |
| 4 | Kevin Harvick | Stewart-Haas Racing | Ford |
| 5 | Kyle Larson | Hendrick Motorsports | Chevrolet |
| 6 | Ryan Newman | Roush Fenway Racing | Ford |
| 7 | Corey LaJoie | Spire Motorsports | Chevrolet |
| 8 | Tyler Reddick | Richard Childress Racing | Chevrolet |
| 9 | Chase Elliott | Hendrick Motorsports | Chevrolet |
| 10 | Aric Almirola | Stewart-Haas Racing | Ford |
| 11 | Denny Hamlin | Joe Gibbs Racing | Toyota |
| 12 | Ryan Blaney | Team Penske | Ford |
| 14 | Chase Briscoe (R) | Stewart-Haas Racing | Ford |
| 15 | Joey Gase (i) | Rick Ware Racing | Ford |
| 16 | Kaz Grala (i) | Kaulig Racing | Chevrolet |
| 17 | Chris Buescher | Roush Fenway Racing | Ford |
| 18 | Kyle Busch | Joe Gibbs Racing | Toyota |
| 19 | Martin Truex Jr. | Joe Gibbs Racing | Toyota |
| 20 | Christopher Bell | Joe Gibbs Racing | Toyota |
| 21 | Matt DiBenedetto | Wood Brothers Racing | Ford |
| 22 | Joey Logano | Team Penske | Ford |
| 23 | Bubba Wallace | 23XI Racing | Toyota |
| 24 | William Byron | Hendrick Motorsports | Chevrolet |
| 34 | Michael McDowell | Front Row Motorsports | Ford |
| 37 | Ryan Preece | JTG Daugherty Racing | Chevrolet |
| 38 | Anthony Alfredo (R) | Front Row Motorsports | Ford |
| 41 | Cole Custer | Stewart-Haas Racing | Ford |
| 42 | Ross Chastain | Chip Ganassi Racing | Chevrolet |
| 43 | Erik Jones | Richard Petty Motorsports | Chevrolet |
| 47 | Ricky Stenhouse Jr. | JTG Daugherty Racing | Chevrolet |
| 48 | Alex Bowman | Hendrick Motorsports | Chevrolet |
| 51 | Cody Ware (i) | Petty Ware Racing | Chevrolet |
| 52 | Josh Bilicki | Rick Ware Racing | Ford |
| 53 | Garrett Smithley (i) | Rick Ware Racing | Chevrolet |
| 66 | David Starr (i) | MBM Motorsports | Ford |
| 77 | Justin Haley (i) | Spire Motorsports | Chevrolet |
| 78 | B. J. McLeod (i) | Live Fast Motorsports | Ford |
| 96 | Landon Cassill (i) | Gaunt Brothers Racing | Toyota |
| 99 | Daniel Suárez | Trackhouse Racing Team | Chevrolet |
Official entry list

== Qualifying ==
Kyle Larson was awarded the pole for the race as determined by competition-based formula.

=== Starting Lineup ===
| Pos | No. | Driver | Team | Manufacturer |
|---|---|---|---|---|
| 1 | 5 | Kyle Larson | Hendrick Motorsports | Chevrolet |
| 2 | 24 | William Byron | Hendrick Motorsports | Chevrolet |
| 3 | 11 | Denny Hamlin | Joe Gibbs Racing | Toyota |
| 4 | 18 | Kyle Busch | Joe Gibbs Racing | Toyota |
| 5 | 9 | Chase Elliott | Hendrick Motorsports | Chevrolet |
| 6 | 12 | Ryan Blaney | Team Penske | Ford |
| 7 | 19 | Martin Truex Jr. | Joe Gibbs Racing | Toyota |
| 8 | 1 | Kurt Busch | Chip Ganassi Racing | Chevrolet |
| 9 | 21 | Matt DiBenedetto | Wood Brothers Racing | Ford |
| 10 | 2 | Brad Keselowski | Team Penske | Ford |
| 11 | 4 | Kevin Harvick | Stewart-Haas Racing | Ford |
| 12 | 47 | Ricky Stenhouse Jr. | JTG Daugherty Racing | Chevrolet |
| 13 | 17 | Chris Buescher | Roush Fenway Racing | Ford |
| 14 | 20 | Christopher Bell | Joe Gibbs Racing | Toyota |
| 15 | 48 | Alex Bowman | Hendrick Motorsports | Chevrolet |
| 16 | 14 | Chase Briscoe (R) | Stewart-Haas Racing | Ford |
| 17 | 8 | Tyler Reddick | Richard Childress Racing | Chevrolet |
| 18 | 34 | Michael McDowell | Front Row Motorsports | Ford |
| 19 | 10 | Aric Almirola | Stewart-Haas Racing | Ford |
| 20 | 23 | Bubba Wallace | 23XI Racing | Toyota |
| 21 | 43 | Erik Jones | Richard Petty Motorsports | Chevrolet |
| 22 | 22 | Joey Logano | Team Penske | Ford |
| 23 | 6 | Ryan Newman | Roush Fenway Racing | Ford |
| 24 | 37 | Ryan Preece | JTG Daugherty Racing | Chevrolet |
| 25 | 41 | Cole Custer | Stewart-Haas Racing | Ford |
| 26 | 99 | Daniel Suárez | Trackhouse Racing Team | Chevrolet |
| 27 | 3 | Austin Dillon | Richard Childress Racing | Chevrolet |
| 28 | 77 | Justin Haley (i) | Spire Motorsports | Chevrolet |
| 29 | 42 | Ross Chastain | Chip Ganassi Racing | Chevrolet |
| 30 | 78 | B. J. McLeod (i) | Live Fast Motorsports | Ford |
| 31 | 51 | Cody Ware (i) | Petty Ware Racing | Chevrolet |
| 32 | 38 | Anthony Alfredo (R) | Front Row Motorsports | Ford |
| 33 | 7 | Corey LaJoie | Spire Motorsports | Chevrolet |
| 34 | 53 | Garrett Smithley (i) | Rick Ware Racing | Chevrolet |
| 35 | 00 | Quin Houff | StarCom Racing | Chevrolet |
| 36 | 52 | Josh Bilicki | Rick Ware Racing | Ford |
| 37 | 15 | Joey Gase (i) | Rick Ware Racing | Ford |
| 38 | 16 | Kaz Grala (i) | Kaulig Racing | Chevrolet |
| 39 | 96 | Landon Cassill (i) | Gaunt Brothers Racing | Toyota |
| 40 | 66 | David Starr (i) | MBM Motorsports | Ford |
Official starting lineup

== Race ==
=== Stage Results ===
Stage One Laps: 50

| Pos | No | Driver | Team | Manufacturer | Points |
|---|---|---|---|---|---|
| 1 | 9 | Chase Elliott | Hendrick Motorsports | Chevrolet | 10 |
| 2 | 11 | Denny Hamlin | Joe Gibbs Racing | Toyota | 9 |
| 3 | 18 | Kyle Busch | Joe Gibbs Racing | Toyota | 8 |
| 4 | 42 | Ross Chastain | Chip Ganassi Racing | Chevrolet | 7 |
| 5 | 19 | Martin Truex Jr. | Joe Gibbs Racing | Toyota | 6 |
| 6 | 3 | Austin Dillon | Richard Childress Racing | Chevrolet | 5 |
| 7 | 7 | Corey LaJoie | Spire Motorsports | Chevrolet | 4 |
| 8 | 22 | Joey Logano | Team Penske | Ford | 3 |
| 9 | 37 | Ryan Preece | JTG Daugherty Racing | Chevrolet | 2 |
| 10 | 20 | Christopher Bell | Joe Gibbs Racing | Toyota | 1 |
Official stage one results

Stage Two Laps: 50

| Pos | No | Driver | Team | Manufacturer | Points |
|---|---|---|---|---|---|
| 1 | 22 | Joey Logano | Team Penske | Ford | 10 |
| 2 | 3 | Austin Dillon | Richard Childress Racing | Chevrolet | 9 |
| 3 | 24 | William Byron | Hendrick Motorsports | Chevrolet | 8 |
| 4 | 8 | Tyler Reddick | Richard Childress Racing | Chevrolet | 7 |
| 5 | 5 | Kyle Larson | Hendrick Motorsports | Chevrolet | 6 |
| 6 | 12 | Ryan Blaney | Team Penske | Ford | 5 |
| 7 | 47 | Ricky Stenhouse Jr. | JTG Daugherty Racing | Chevrolet | 4 |
| 8 | 18 | Kyle Busch | Joe Gibbs Racing | Toyota | 3 |
| 9 | 23 | Bubba Wallace | 23XI Racing | Toyota | 2 |
| 10 | 20 | Christopher Bell | Joe Gibbs Racing | Toyota | 1 |
Official stage two results

=== Final Stage Results ===
Stage Three Laps: 60

| Pos | Grid | No | Driver | Team | Manufacturer | Laps | Points |
|---|---|---|---|---|---|---|---|
| 1 | 6 | 12 | Ryan Blaney | Team Penske | Ford | 165 | 45 |
| 2 | 20 | 23 | Bubba Wallace | 23XI Racing | Toyota | 165 | 37 |
| 3 | 23 | 6 | Ryan Newman | Roush Fenway Racing | Ford | 165 | 34 |
| 4 | 24 | 37 | Ryan Preece | JTG Daugherty Racing | Chevrolet | 165 | 35 |
| 5 | 17 | 8 | Tyler Reddick | Richard Childress Racing | Chevrolet | 165 | 39 |
| 6 | 28 | 77 | Justin Haley (i) | Spire Motorsports | Chevrolet | 165 | 0 |
| 7 | 15 | 48 | Alex Bowman | Hendrick Motorsports | Chevrolet | 165 | 30 |
| 8 | 5 | 9 | Chase Elliott | Hendrick Motorsports | Chevrolet | 165 | 39 |
| 9 | 30 | 78 | B. J. McLeod (i) | Live Fast Motorsports | Ford | 165 | 0 |
| 10 | 36 | 52 | Josh Bilicki | Rick Ware Racing | Ford | 165 | 27 |
| 11 | 21 | 43 | Erik Jones | Richard Petty Motorsports | Chevrolet | 165 | 26 |
| 12 | 8 | 1 | Kurt Busch | Chip Ganassi Racing | Chevrolet | 165 | 25 |
| 13 | 3 | 11 | Denny Hamlin | Joe Gibbs Racing | Toyota | 165 | 33 |
| 14 | 19 | 10 | Aric Almirola | Stewart-Haas Racing | Ford | 165 | 23 |
| 15 | 11 | 4 | Kevin Harvick | Stewart-Haas Racing | Ford | 165 | 22 |
| 16 | 33 | 7 | Corey LaJoie | Spire Motorsports | Chevrolet | 164 | 25 |
| 17 | 27 | 3 | Austin Dillon | Richard Childress Racing | Chevrolet | 164 | 34 |
| 18 | 29 | 42 | Ross Chastain | Chip Ganassi Racing | Chevrolet | 164 | 26 |
| 19 | 26 | 99 | Daniel Suárez | Trackhouse Racing Team | Chevrolet | 164 | 18 |
| 20 | 1 | 5 | Kyle Larson | Hendrick Motorsports | Chevrolet | 164 | 23 |
| 21 | 16 | 14 | Chase Briscoe (R) | Stewart-Haas Racing | Ford | 164 | 16 |
| 22 | 12 | 47 | Ricky Stenhouse Jr. | JTG Daugherty Racing | Chevrolet | 164 | 19 |
| 23 | 22 | 22 | Joey Logano | Team Penske | Ford | 164 | 27 |
| 24 | 25 | 41 | Cole Custer | Stewart-Haas Racing | Ford | 164 | 13 |
| 25 | 9 | 21 | Matt DiBenedetto | Wood Brothers Racing | Ford | 164 | 12 |
| 26 | 32 | 38 | Anthony Alfredo (R) | Front Row Motorsports | Ford | 163 | 11 |
| 27 | 40 | 66 | David Starr (i) | MBM Motorsports | Ford | 163 | 0 |
| 28 | 31 | 51 | Cody Ware (i) | Petty Ware Racing | Chevrolet | 163 | 0 |
| 29 | 7 | 19 | Martin Truex Jr. | Joe Gibbs Racing | Toyota | 163 | 14 |
| 30 | 34 | 53 | Garrett Smithley (i) | Rick Ware Racing | Chevrolet | 163 | 0 |
| 31 | 37 | 15 | Joey Gase (i) | Rick Ware Racing | Ford | 162 | 0 |
| 32 | 14 | 20 | Christopher Bell | Joe Gibbs Racing | Toyota | 157 | 7 |
| 33 | 10 | 2 | Brad Keselowski | Team Penske | Ford | 156 | 4 |
| 34 | 4 | 18 | Kyle Busch | Joe Gibbs Racing | Toyota | 156 | 14 |
| 35 | 38 | 16 | Kaz Grala (i) | Kaulig Racing | Chevrolet | 156 | 0 |
| 36 | 39 | 96 | Landon Cassill (i) | Gaunt Brothers Racing | Toyota | 146 | 0 |
| 37 | 2 | 24 | William Byron | Hendrick Motorsports | Chevrolet | 146 | 9 |
| 38 | 35 | 00 | Quin Houff | StarCom Racing | Chevrolet | 136 | 1 |
| 39 | 18 | 34 | Michael McDowell | Front Row Motorsports | Ford | 23 | 1 |
| DSQ | 13 | 17 | Chris Buescher (Note: Buescher initially finished 2nd, but was disqualified after failing post-race inspection for an unapproved track bar mounting assembly.) | Roush Fenway Racing | Ford | 165 | 1 |
Official race results

=== Race statistics ===
- Lead changes: 45 among 15 different drivers
- Cautions/Laps: 8 for 31
- Red flags: 1 for 14 minutes and 51 seconds
- Time of race: 2 hours, 54 minutes and 3 seconds
- Average speed: 142.201 miles per hour (228.850 km/h)

== Media ==
=== Television ===
NBC Sports covered the race on the television side. Rick Allen, 2000 Coke Zero 400 winner Jeff Burton, Steve Letarte and two-time Coke Zero 400 winner Dale Earnhardt Jr. called the race from the broadcast booth. Dave Burns, Parker Kligerman, and Marty Snider handled the pit road duties from pit lane.

NBC
| Booth announcers | Pit reporters |
|---|---|
| Lap-by-lap: Rick Allen; Color-commentator: Jeff Burton; Color-commentator: Steve Letarte; Color-commentator: Dale Earnhardt Jr. | Dave Burns; Parker Kligerman; Marty Snider |

=== Radio ===
MRN had the radio call for the race, which was also simulcast on Sirius XM NASCAR Radio.

MRN Radio
| Booth announcers | Turn announcers | Pit reporters |
|---|---|---|
| Lead announcer: Alex Hayden; Announcer: Jeff Striegle | Turns 1 & 2: Dave Moody; Backstretch: Mike Bagley; Turns 3 & 4: Kyle Rickey | Steve Post; Hannah Newhouse |

== Standings after the race ==
Drivers' Championship standings after Playoffs reset

| | Pos | Driver | Points |
|---|---|---|---|
| | 1 | Kyle Larson | 2,052 |
| 5 | 2 | Ryan Blaney | 2,024 (–28) |
| 3 | 3 | Martin Truex Jr. | 2,024 (–28) |
| 1 | 4 | Kyle Busch | 2,022 (–30) |
| | 5 | Chase Elliott | 2,021 (–31) |
| 6 | 6 | Alex Bowman | 2,015 (–37) |
| 5 | 7 | Denny Hamlin | 2,015 (–37) |
| 4 | 8 | William Byron | 2,014 (–38) |
| 1 | 9 | Joey Logano | 2,013 (–39) |
| | 10 | Brad Keselowski | 2,008 (–44) |
| 3 | 11 | Kurt Busch | 2,008 (–44) |
| 3 | 12 | Christopher Bell | 2,005 (–47) |
| 6 | 13 | Michael McDowell | 2,005 (–47) |
| 9 | 14 | Aric Almirola | 2,005 (–47) |
| 4 | 15 | Tyler Reddick | 2,003 (–49) |
| 7 | 16 | Kevin Harvick | 2,002 (–50) |
Official driver's standings

Manufacturers' Championship standings

| Pos | Manufacturer | Points |
|---|---|---|
| 1 | Chevrolet | 960 |
| 2 | Ford | 902 (–58) |
| 3 | Toyota | 880 (–80) |

- Note: Only the first 16 positions are included for the driver standings.

== Notes ==
| Previous race: 2021 FireKeepers Casino 400 | NASCAR Cup Series; 2021 season | Next race: 2021 Cook Out Southern 500 |
