= 2021 Cook Out Southern 500 =

NASCAR Cup Series race

Race details
- Race 27 of 36 in the 2021 NASCAR Cup Series
- The 2021 Cook Out Southern 500 program cover.
- Date: September 5, 2021
- Location: Darlington Raceway in Darlington, South Carolina
- Course: Permanent racing facility
- Course length: 1.366 miles (2.198 km)
- Distance: 367 laps, 501.322 mi (806.666 km)
- Average speed: 121.279 miles per hour (195.180 km/h)

Pole position
| Driver | Ryan Blaney | Team Penske |
- Grid positions set by competition-based formula

Most laps led
| Driver | Kyle Larson | Hendrick Motorsports |
- Laps: 156

Winner
| No. 11 | Denny Hamlin | Joe Gibbs Racing |

Television in the United States
- Network: NBCSN
- Announcers: Rick Allen, Jeff Burton, Steve Letarte, Dale Earnhardt Jr., Dale Jarrett and Kyle Petty

Radio in the United States
- Radio: MRN
- Booth announcers: Alex Hayden, Jeff Striegle and Rusty Wallace
- Turn announcers: Dave Moody (1 & 2) and Mike Bagley (3 & 4)

The 2021 Cook Out Southern 500, the 72nd running of the event, was a NASCAR Cup Series race held on September 5, 2021, at Darlington Raceway in Darlington, South Carolina. Contested over 367 laps on the 1.366-mile (2.198 km) egg-shaped oval, it was the 27th race of the 2021 NASCAR Cup Series season, first race of the Playoffs, and the first race of the Round of 16. Denny Hamlin took his first victory of the season and clinched a spot in the round of 12.

== Report ==
=== Background ===
Darlington Raceway where the race was held.

Darlington Raceway is a race track built for NASCAR racing located near Darlington, South Carolina. It is nicknamed "The Lady in Black" and "The Track Too Tough to Tame" by many NASCAR fans and drivers and advertised as "A NASCAR Tradition." It is of a unique, somewhat egg-shaped design, an oval with the ends of very different configurations, a condition which supposedly arose from the proximity of one end of the track to a minnow pond the owner refused to relocate. This situation makes it very challenging for the crews to set up their cars' handling in a way that is effective at both ends.

==== Surface issues ====
Darlington Raceway was last repaved following the May 2007 meeting (from 2005 to 2019, there was only one meeting; the second meeting was reinstated in 2020), and from 2008 to 2019, there was one night race. In 2020, a day race returned to the schedule, and instead of two races (one Xfinity and one Cup) during the entire year, the track hosted six races (three Cup, two Xfinity, and one Truck). The circuit kept repairing the circuit with patches during each summer before the annual Cup race in September. The circuit's narrow Turn 2 rapidly deteriorated with cracks in the tarmac allowing water to seep in the circuit. In July 2021, the circuit repaved a six hundred foot section at the entrance of Turn 2 and ending at the exit of the turn to repair the tarmac and resolve the issue for safety and to reduce the threat of weepers and surface issues in that section of the circuit.

The 2021 race also marked the addition of an athletics event as part of the Southern 500 weekend, the Terrence Carraway Memorial 5K athletics event, held around the circuit. The Darlington Raceway 5k was first held in November for 2018 and 2019 in memory of a local policeman killed in the line of duty. After taking a year off in 2020, the event moved to the Southern 500 weekend for 2021.

==== Entry list ====
- (R) denotes rookie driver.
- (i) denotes driver who are ineligible for series driver points.

| No. | Driver | Team | Manufacturer |
|---|---|---|---|
| 00 | Quin Houff | StarCom Racing | Chevrolet |
| 1 | Kurt Busch | Chip Ganassi Racing | Chevrolet |
| 2 | Brad Keselowski | Team Penske | Ford |
| 3 | Austin Dillon | Richard Childress Racing | Chevrolet |
| 4 | Kevin Harvick | Stewart-Haas Racing | Ford |
| 5 | Kyle Larson | Hendrick Motorsports | Chevrolet |
| 6 | Ryan Newman | Roush Fenway Racing | Ford |
| 7 | Corey LaJoie | Spire Motorsports | Chevrolet |
| 8 | Tyler Reddick | Richard Childress Racing | Chevrolet |
| 9 | Chase Elliott | Hendrick Motorsports | Chevrolet |
| 10 | Aric Almirola | Stewart-Haas Racing | Ford |
| 11 | Denny Hamlin | Joe Gibbs Racing | Toyota |
| 12 | Ryan Blaney | Team Penske | Ford |
| 14 | Chase Briscoe (R) | Stewart-Haas Racing | Ford |
| 15 | Joey Gase (i) | Rick Ware Racing | Chevrolet |
| 17 | Chris Buescher | Roush Fenway Racing | Ford |
| 18 | Kyle Busch | Joe Gibbs Racing | Toyota |
| 19 | Martin Truex Jr. | Joe Gibbs Racing | Toyota |
| 20 | Christopher Bell | Joe Gibbs Racing | Toyota |
| 21 | Matt DiBenedetto | Wood Brothers Racing | Ford |
| 22 | Joey Logano | Team Penske | Ford |
| 23 | Bubba Wallace | 23XI Racing | Toyota |
| 24 | William Byron | Hendrick Motorsports | Chevrolet |
| 34 | Michael McDowell | Front Row Motorsports | Ford |
| 37 | Ryan Preece | JTG Daugherty Racing | Chevrolet |
| 38 | Anthony Alfredo (R) | Front Row Motorsports | Ford |
| 41 | Cole Custer | Stewart-Haas Racing | Ford |
| 42 | Ross Chastain | Chip Ganassi Racing | Chevrolet |
| 43 | Erik Jones | Richard Petty Motorsports | Chevrolet |
| 47 | Ricky Stenhouse Jr. | JTG Daugherty Racing | Chevrolet |
| 48 | Alex Bowman | Hendrick Motorsports | Chevrolet |
| 51 | Cody Ware (i) | Petty Ware Racing | Chevrolet |
| 52 | Josh Bilicki | Rick Ware Racing | Ford |
| 53 | James Davison | Rick Ware Racing | Chevrolet |
| 77 | Justin Haley (i) | Spire Motorsports | Chevrolet |
| 78 | B. J. McLeod (i) | Live Fast Motorsports | Ford |
| 99 | Daniel Suárez | Trackhouse Racing Team | Chevrolet |
Official entry list

== Qualifying ==
Ryan Blaney was awarded the pole for the race as determined by competition-based formula.

=== Starting lineup ===
| Pos | No. | Driver | Team | Manufacturer |
|---|---|---|---|---|
| 1 | 12 | Ryan Blaney | Team Penske | Ford |
| 2 | 11 | Denny Hamlin | Joe Gibbs Racing | Toyota |
| 3 | 1 | Kurt Busch | Chip Ganassi Racing | Chevrolet |
| 4 | 9 | Chase Elliott | Hendrick Motorsports | Chevrolet |
| 5 | 48 | Alex Bowman | Hendrick Motorsports | Chevrolet |
| 6 | 5 | Kyle Larson | Hendrick Motorsports | Chevrolet |
| 7 | 8 | Tyler Reddick | Richard Childress Racing | Chevrolet |
| 8 | 10 | Aric Almirola | Stewart-Haas Racing | Ford |
| 9 | 4 | Kevin Harvick | Stewart-Haas Racing | Ford |
| 10 | 19 | Martin Truex Jr. | Joe Gibbs Racing | Toyota |
| 11 | 22 | Joey Logano | Team Penske | Ford |
| 12 | 18 | Kyle Busch | Joe Gibbs Racing | Toyota |
| 13 | 20 | Christopher Bell | Joe Gibbs Racing | Toyota |
| 14 | 24 | William Byron | Hendrick Motorsports | Chevrolet |
| 15 | 34 | Michael McDowell | Front Row Motorsports | Ford |
| 16 | 2 | Brad Keselowski | Team Penske | Ford |
| 17 | 23 | Bubba Wallace | 23XI Racing | Toyota |
| 18 | 37 | Ryan Preece | JTG Daugherty Racing | Chevrolet |
| 19 | 6 | Ryan Newman | Roush Fenway Racing | Ford |
| 20 | 77 | Justin Haley (i) | Spire Motorsports | Chevrolet |
| 21 | 3 | Austin Dillon | Richard Childress Racing | Chevrolet |
| 22 | 43 | Erik Jones | Richard Petty Motorsports | Chevrolet |
| 23 | 42 | Ross Chastain | Chip Ganassi Racing | Chevrolet |
| 24 | 14 | Chase Briscoe (R) | Stewart-Haas Racing | Ford |
| 25 | 7 | Corey LaJoie | Spire Motorsports | Chevrolet |
| 26 | 99 | Daniel Suárez | Trackhouse Racing Team | Chevrolet |
| 27 | 78 | B. J. McLeod (i) | Live Fast Motorsports | Ford |
| 28 | 52 | Josh Bilicki | Rick Ware Racing | Ford |
| 29 | 47 | Ricky Stenhouse Jr. | JTG Daugherty Racing | Chevrolet |
| 30 | 21 | Matt DiBenedetto | Wood Brothers Racing | Ford |
| 31 | 41 | Cole Custer | Stewart-Haas Racing | Ford |
| 32 | 38 | Anthony Alfredo (R) | Front Row Motorsports | Ford |
| 33 | 51 | Cody Ware (i) | Petty Ware Racing | Chevrolet |
| 34 | 17 | Chris Buescher | Roush Fenway Racing | Ford |
| 35 | 15 | Joey Gase (i) | Rick Ware Racing | Chevrolet |
| 36 | 53 | James Davison | Rick Ware Racing | Chevrolet |
| 37 | 00 | Quin Houff | StarCom Racing | Chevrolet |
Official starting lineup

== Race ==
=== Stage results ===
Stage One Laps: 115

| Pos | No | Driver | Team | Manufacturer | Points |
|---|---|---|---|---|---|
| 1 | 11 | Denny Hamlin | Joe Gibbs Racing | Toyota | 10 |
| 2 | 5 | Kyle Larson | Hendrick Motorsports | Chevrolet | 9 |
| 3 | 1 | Kurt Busch | Chip Ganassi Racing | Chevrolet | 8 |
| 4 | 12 | Ryan Blaney | Team Penske | Ford | 7 |
| 5 | 4 | Kevin Harvick | Stewart-Haas Racing | Chevrolet | 6 |
| 6 | 19 | Martin Truex Jr. | Joe Gibbs Racing | Toyota | 5 |
| 7 | 8 | Tyler Reddick | Richard Childress Racing | Chevrolet | 4 |
| 8 | 10 | Aric Almirola | Stewart-Haas Racing | Ford | 3 |
| 9 | 42 | Ross Chastain | Chip Ganassi Racing | Chevrolet | 2 |
| 10 | 22 | Joey Logano | Team Penske | Ford | 1 |
Official stage one results

Stage Two Laps: 115

| Pos | No | Driver | Team | Manufacturer | Points |
|---|---|---|---|---|---|
| 1 | 5 | Kyle Larson | Hendrick Motorsports | Chevrolet | 10 |
| 2 | 20 | Christopher Bell | Joe Gibbs Racing | Toyota | 9 |
| 3 | 42 | Ross Chastain | Chip Ganassi Racing | Chevrolet | 8 |
| 4 | 11 | Denny Hamlin | Joe Gibbs Racing | Toyota | 7 |
| 5 | 4 | Kevin Harvick | Stewart-Haas Racing | Ford | 6 |
| 6 | 1 | Kurt Busch | Chip Ganassi Racing | Chevrolet | 5 |
| 7 | 22 | Joey Logano | Team Penske | Ford | 4 |
| 8 | 9 | Chase Elliott | Hendrick Motorsports | Chevrolet | 3 |
| 9 | 12 | Ryan Blaney | Team Penske | Ford | 2 |
| 10 | 7 | Corey LaJoie | Spire Motorsports | Chevrolet | 1 |
Official stage two results

=== Final stage results ===
Stage Three Laps: 137

| Pos | Grid | No | Driver | Team | Manufacturer | Laps | Points |
|---|---|---|---|---|---|---|---|
| 1 | 2 | 11 | Denny Hamlin | Joe Gibbs Racing | Toyota | 367 | 57 |
| 2 | 6 | 5 | Kyle Larson | Hendrick Motorsports | Chevrolet | 367 | 54 |
| 3 | 23 | 42 | Ross Chastain | Chip Ganassi Racing | Chevrolet | 367 | 44 |
| 4 | 10 | 19 | Martin Truex Jr. | Joe Gibbs Racing | Toyota | 367 | 38 |
| 5 | 9 | 4 | Kevin Harvick | Stewart-Haas Racing | Ford | 367 | 44 |
| 6 | 3 | 1 | Kurt Busch | Chip Ganassi Racing | Chevrolet | 367 | 44 |
| 7 | 16 | 2 | Brad Keselowski | Team Penske | Ford | 367 | 30 |
| 8 | 11 | 22 | Joey Logano | Team Penske | Ford | 367 | 34 |
| 9 | 34 | 17 | Chris Buescher | Roush Fenway Racing | Ford | 367 | 28 |
| 10 | 21 | 3 | Austin Dillon | Richard Childress Racing | Chevrolet | 367 | 27 |
| 11 | 31 | 41 | Cole Custer | Stewart-Haas Racing | Ford | 367 | 26 |
| 12 | 18 | 37 | Ryan Preece | JTG Daugherty Racing | Chevrolet | 367 | 25 |
| 13 | 26 | 99 | Daniel Suárez | Trackhouse Racing Team | Chevrolet | 367 | 24 |
| 14 | 19 | 6 | Ryan Newman | Roush Fenway Racing | Ford | 367 | 23 |
| 15 | 25 | 7 | Corey LaJoie | Spire Motorsports | Chevrolet | 367 | 23 |
| 16 | 8 | 10 | Aric Almirola | Stewart-Haas Racing | Ford | 366 | 24 |
| 17 | 29 | 47 | Ricky Stenhouse Jr. | JTG Daugherty Racing | Chevrolet | 366 | 20 |
| 18 | 7 | 8 | Tyler Reddick | Richard Childress Racing | Chevrolet | 366 | 23 |
| 19 | 24 | 14 | Chase Briscoe (R) | Stewart-Haas Racing | Ford | 366 | 18 |
| 20 | 13 | 20 | Christopher Bell | Joe Gibbs Racing | Toyota | 366 | 26 |
| 21 | 17 | 23 | Bubba Wallace | 23XI Racing | Toyota | 366 | 16 |
| 22 | 1 | 12 | Ryan Blaney | Team Penske | Ford | 366 | 24 |
| 23 | 30 | 21 | Matt DiBenedetto | Wood Brothers Racing | Ford | 365 | 14 |
| 24 | 32 | 38 | Anthony Alfredo (R) | Front Row Motorsports | Ford | 364 | 13 |
| 25 | 20 | 77 | Justin Haley (i) | Spire Motorsports | Chevrolet | 364 | 0 |
| 26 | 5 | 48 | Alex Bowman | Hendrick Motorsports | Chevrolet | 363 | 11 |
| 27 | 27 | 78 | B. J. McLeod (i) | Live Fast Motorsports | Ford | 359 | 0 |
| 28 | 28 | 52 | Josh Bilicki | Rick Ware Racing | Ford | 359 | 9 |
| 29 | 35 | 15 | Joey Gase (i) | Rick Ware Racing | Chevrolet | 357 | 0 |
| 30 | 37 | 00 | Quin Houff | StarCom Racing | Chevrolet | 355 | 7 |
| 31 | 4 | 9 | Chase Elliott | Hendrick Motorsports | Chevrolet | 327 | 9 |
| 32 | 22 | 43 | Erik Jones | Richard Petty Motorsports | Chevrolet | 264 | 5 |
| 33 | 33 | 51 | Cody Ware (i) | Petty Ware Racing | Chevrolet | 209 | 0 |
| 34 | 14 | 24 | William Byron | Hendrick Motorsports | Chevrolet | 199 | 3 |
| 35 | 12 | 18 | Kyle Busch | Joe Gibbs Racing | Toyota | 125 | 2 |
| 36 | 36 | 53 | James Davison | Rick Ware Racing | Chevrolet | 50 | 1 |
| 37 | 15 | 34 | Michael McDowell | Front Row Motorsports | Ford | 30 | 1 |
Official race results

=== Race statistics ===
- Lead changes: 18 among 10 different drivers
- Cautions/Laps: 11 for 52
- Red flags: 0
- Time of race: 4 hours, 8 minutes and 1 second
- Average speed: 121.279 miles per hour (195.180 km/h)

== Media ==
=== Television ===
NBC Sports covered the race on the television side. Rick Allen, two–time Darlington winner Jeff Burton, Steve Letarte and Dale Earnhardt Jr. called Stages 1 and 3 of the race from the broadcast booth. Earnhardt Jr., Dale Jarrett and Kyle Petty called Stage 2 of the race from the broadcast booth. Dave Burns, Parker Kligerman and Marty Snider handled the pit road duties from pit lane.

NBCSN
| Booth announcers | Pit reporters |
|---|---|
| Lap-by-lap: Rick Allen; Color-commentator: Jeff Burton; Color-commentator: Steve Letarte; Color-commentator: Dale Earnhardt Jr. Throwback commentator: Dale Jarrett; Throwback commentator: Kyle Petty | Dave Burns; Parker Kligerman; Marty Snider |

=== Radio ===
MRN had the radio call for the race, which was also simulcast on Sirius XM NASCAR Radio.

MRN Radio
| Booth announcers | Turn announcers | Pit reporters |
|---|---|---|
| Lead announcer: Alex Hayden; Announcer: Jeff Striegle; Announcer: Rusty Wallace | Turns 1 & 2: Dave Moody; Turns 3 & 4: Mike Bagley | Steve Post; Kim Coon |

== Standings after the race ==
Drivers' Championship standings

| | Pos | Driver | Points |
|---|---|---|---|
| | 1 | Kyle Larson | 2,106 |
| 5 | 2 | Denny Hamlin | 2,072 (–34) |
| | 3 | Martin Truex Jr. | 2,062 (–44) |
| 6 | 4 | Kurt Busch | 2,052 (–54) |
| 3 | 5 | Ryan Blaney | 2,048 (–58) |
| 3 | 6 | Joey Logano | 2,047 (–59) |
| 9 | 7 | Kevin Harvick | 2,046 (–60) |
| 2 | 8 | Brad Keselowski | 2,038 (–68) |
| 3 | 9 | Christopher Bell | 2,031 (–75) |
| 5 | 10 | Chase Elliott | 2,030 (–76) |
| 3 | 11 | Aric Almirola | 2,029 (–77) |
| 3 | 12 | Tyler Reddick | 2,026 (–80) |
| 7 | 13 | Alex Bowman | 2,026 (–80) |
| 10 | 14 | Kyle Busch | 2,024 (–82) |
| 7 | 15 | William Byron | 2,017 (–89) |
| 3 | 16 | Michael McDowell | 2,006 (–100) |
Official driver's standings

Manufacturers' Championship standings

| Pos | Manufacturer | Points |
|---|---|---|
| 1 | Chevrolet | 995 |
| 2 | Ford | 934 (–61) |
| 3 | Toyota | 920 (–75) |

- Note: Only the first 16 positions are included for the driver standings.

| Previous race: 2021 Coke Zero Sugar 400 | NASCAR Cup Series; 2021 season | Next race: 2021 Federated Auto Parts 400 |
