= Verizon 200 at the Brickyard =

Auto race held in Indianapolis, U.S.

NASCAR Cup Series
- Venue: Indianapolis Motor Speedway
- Location: Speedway, Indiana, United States
- Corporate sponsor: Verizon
- First race: 2021
- Last race: 2023
- Distance: 199.998 mi (321.866 km)
- Laps: 82; Stage 1: 15; Stage 2: 20; Final stage: 47
- Most wins (manufacturer): Chevrolet (2)

Circuit information
- Surface: Asphalt
- Length: 2.439 mi (3.925 km)
- Turns: 14

The Verizon 200 was an annual NASCAR Cup Series points race held at Indianapolis Motor Speedway for three years. The inaugural race was held in 2021, replacing the Brickyard 400 which was run on a 2.5-mile oval from 1994 to 2020. The race took place on the combined road course and ran a distance of 200-mile (321.869 km). The layout utilized was the newer, modified layout of the circuit previously used for the Formula One U.S. Grand Prix, and currently used for the IndyCar GMR Grand Prix.

The term "Brickyard" pays ode to the track's historical paving method of using bricks. The use of bricks followed the previous and problematic use of a sticky mixture of gravel, limestone, tar, and asphaltum oil. Following several deaths, including a driver, mechanic, and spectators, AAA threatened a boycott of the facility, so the owner agreed to use a brick surface. In October 1961, all the bricks were paved over except a one-yard strip at the start/finish line.

== Race origins ==
=== Brickyard 400 ===
Indianapolis Motor Speedway, which opened in 1909, held its first NASCAR event on Saturday, August 6, 1994. Jeff Gordon, driving the No. 24, won the first event after leading 93 laps. Gordon would go on to win four more Brickyard 400 titles, more than any other driver.

Starting in 2001, the race was moved to Sunday, but remained on the first weekend of August. Six years later, in 2007, coinciding with ESPN taking over NASCAR television rights, the race swapped dates with Pocono Raceway. The Brickyard 400 moved to the last weekend in July, and Pocono to the first weekend in August, which made the Brickyard race the first race in ESPN's coverage.

After fan attendance fell from 200,000 to an estimated 35,000 in 2017, NASCAR and IMS agreed to make the race the final race of the regular season by moving it to September beginning in 2018. They once again attempted to stimulate attendance by moving the race to Fourth of July weekend. Following the purchase of IMS in 2019, by Roger Penske, the track and NASCAR agreed to move the race back to August using a road course format beginning in 2021, featuring an IndyCar-NASCAR doubleheader. As a result of the pandemic-affected 2020 season, where the IndyCar road course race that was originally scheduled for the Month of May was moved to the NASCAR weekend where the Xfinity Series race was moved to the road course, the Speedway agreed to move the second road course meeting, which had been at the 8 Hours Intercontinental GT Challenge race meeting as a result of pandemic changes, to the NASCAR weekend.

== Race details ==
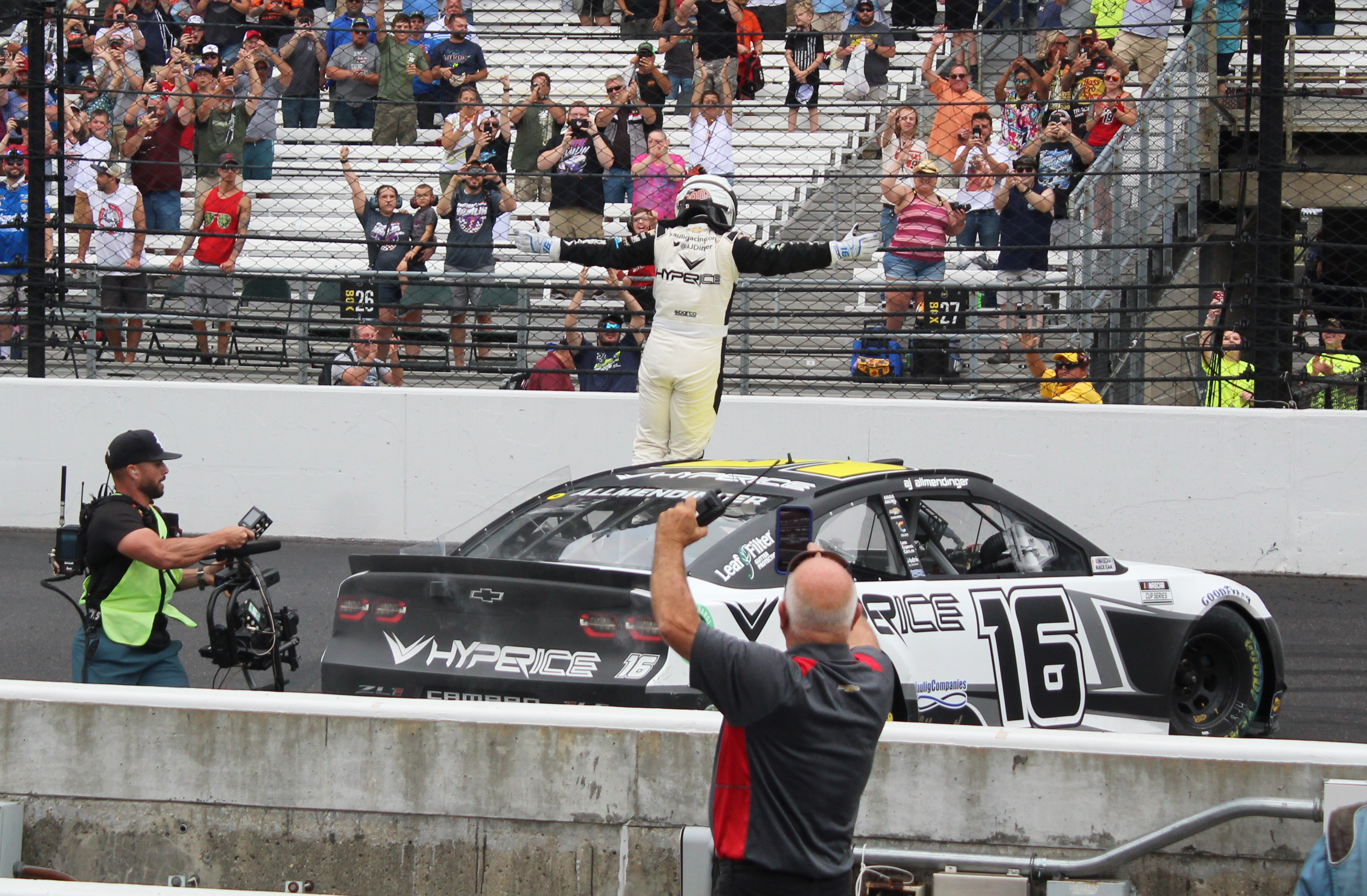
A. J. Allmendinger celebrating 2021 win.

The first race on the road course took place on August 15, 2021. The race on the 14-turn course was won in overtime by road course ringer A. J. Allmendinger. The race was one of six road courses on the schedule for the 2021 season, which was overhauled that same year.

The race followed the IndyCar Series and NASCAR Xfinity Series, which were both raced on the road course track the day before.

=== Attendance ===
The Brickyard 400 once drew some of the largest crowds in NASCAR history, with more than 250,000 spectators. Although popular, attendance began dwindling for several factors including a tire controversy at the 2008 race, poor sightlines compared to other NASCAR tracks, the overall lack of competition, and uncomfortably hot summer temperatures in July/August. In addition, following the change from a track-organized television contract (1994–2000) to a centralized NASCAR television package, the local television blackout the Speedway imposed was lifted. Attendance dropped to an estimated 35,000 in 2017.

While NASCAR does not release attendance data, IMS reported that they had pre-sold 50,000–60,000 tickets with walk-up sales expected, for the inaugural event.

== Race recaps ==
=== 2021 ===
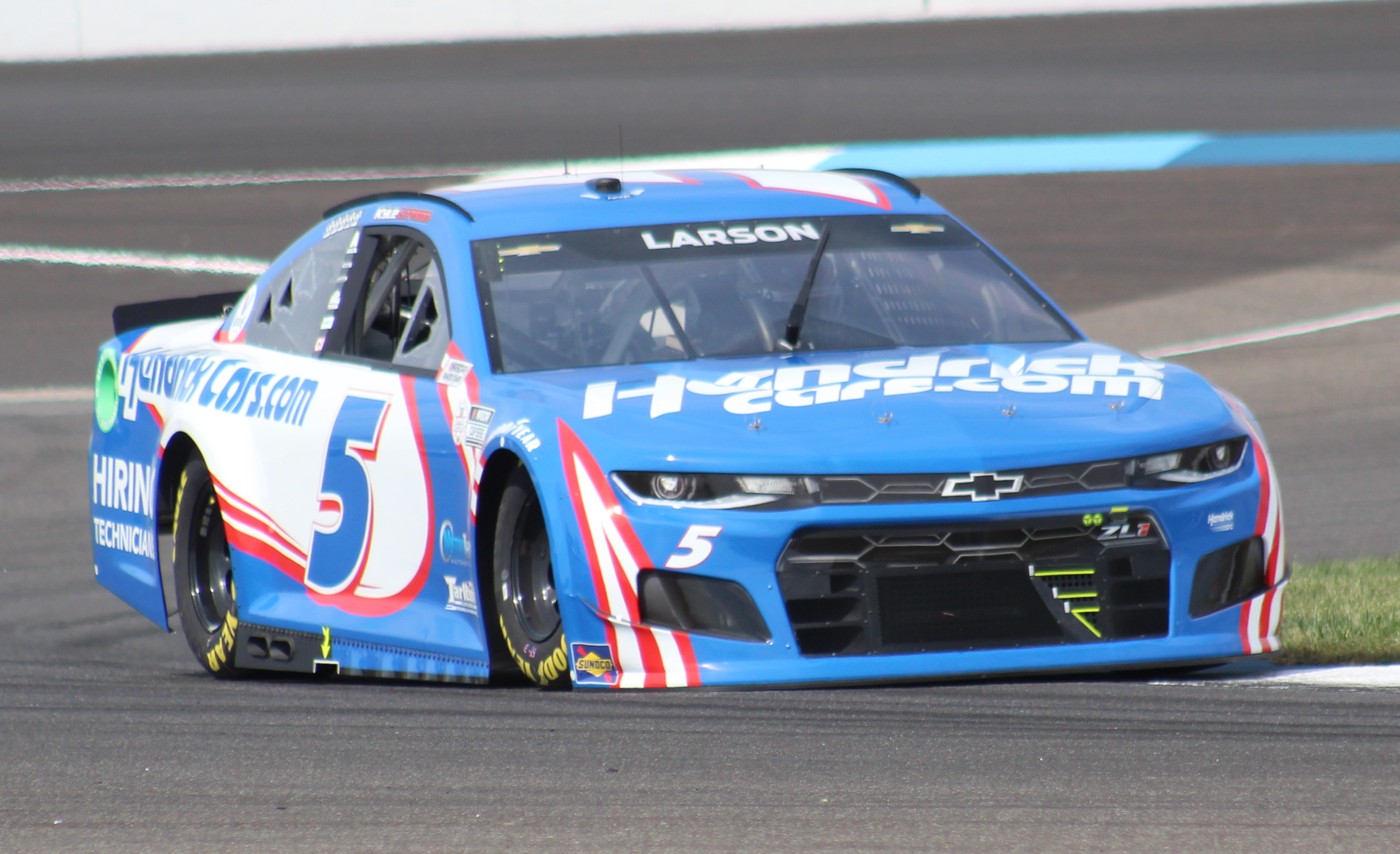
Kyle Larson running the 2021 Verizon 200.

Before the race and qualifying started, NASCAR removed a curb off Turn 6 following complications during the previous day's NASCAR Xfinity Series race. The curb was designed to prevent cars from using the last part of asphalt before the grass. Qualifying was held on the morning of the race and won by William Byron. His pace was 100.044 mph during his one-lap run.

The start time for the race was 1:00 p.m. and aired on NBC.

Local-driver Chase Briscoe battled Byron early and led much of the first stage before taking his first pit stop in a three-stop strategy before the Lap 15 stage break. He finished ninth in the stage, behind stage one winner Tyler Reddick. Chase Elliott, hoping to be the first father-son duo to win the NASCAR classic at Indianapolis, led most of the second stage before making his pit stop at the end of the stage. Reddick again won stage two.

Kyle Larson led 17 laps before pitting and once again resumed the lead ten laps later and led 11 additional laps. With eight laps to go, Denny Hamlin took the lead and was there when on Lap 73 a caution was issued due to debris from the curb on Turn 6, which forced NASCAR to attempt to repair it. During the restart on Lap 77, Martin Truex Jr. wrecked after running over the Turn 6 curb and shrapnel from it was kicked off the racing surface. A caution flag was not thrown, due to NASCAR determining there was no immediate issue. The following lap, Byron ran over the broken curb, which caused a nine-car collision in the chicane. A 19:14 red flag led to the removal of the curb and an additional extended caution period when another car was leaking oil.

Due to the length of the caution, the 82-lap race would end in overtime. On the Lap 89 restart, another multiple-car pileup occurred in the same Turn 6 chicane, without a curb and a 4:08 red flag was forced. On the Lap 94 restart, Hamlin ran Briscoe beyond track limits, which led to Briscoe being assessed a stop and go penalty in the Turn 10 penalty area. As the cars reached Turn 10, Briscoe, still incensed by Hamlin's tactics, spun Hamlin. The penalty was turned into a pass-through but with no time left, NASCAR ceased scoring Briscoe. A. J. Allmendinger, in a part-time Kaulig Racing team set to be a full-time team in 2022, scored the upset win after 95 laps. Ryan Blaney and Kyle Larson filled out the podium.

The curbing issues would affect the next major professional meeting at the Speedway, the 8 Hours Intercontinental GT Challenge race in October. The race was moved to the SCCA Runoffs layout (2.59 miles) instead of the 2.43 mile layout.

=== 2022 ===
Tyler Reddick earned the pole for the race after a two-round qualifying session. Reddick went on to lead the first 12 laps before pitting before the first stage break. Chase Briscoe took the lead and won the first stage. Following the stage break, Ryan Blaney opted to stay out on the track and went on to lead the next 16 laps before pitting and Christopher Bell took over the race lead and went on to win the second stage.

The first natural caution of the race came on lap 62 when Kyle Larson's brakes failed going into turn one and he smashed into Ty Dillon. Reddick cycled back to the front and lead the field back to green and lead until debris on the frontstretch caused another caution on lap 78. Reddick once again got the lead and out-dueled Chase Elliott before Elliott was spun. The caution came back out on lap 81 due to Austin Dillon getting stuck in the gravel, which forced overtime.

Reddick and A. J. Allmendinger were on the front row to start the final restart. Reddick was able to get the lead before turn one where several cars were spun. To try to avoid the cars in turn one, Ross Chastain, running fourth, took an access road around the turn and was able to come out in second. Chastain and Reddick raced for the lead over the next two laps, and Reddick ultimately won his second race of the season. NASCAR ruled that since Chastain missed turn one, that he would be assessed a 30-second penalty. Austin Dillon was also given the same penalty which gave them a 27th- and 30th-place finish respectively.

== Past winners ==
Year	Date	No.	Driver	Team	Manufacturer	Race Distance		Race Time	Average Speed (mph)	Report	Ref
Year	Date	No.	Driver	Team	Manufacturer	Laps	Miles (km)	Race Time	Average Speed (mph)	Report	Ref
2021	August 15	16	A. J. Allmendinger	Kaulig Racing	Chevrolet	95*	231.705 (372.875)	3:20:59	69.171	Report	
2022	July 31	8	Tyler Reddick	Richard Childress Racing	Chevrolet	86*	209.754 (337.55)	2:40:18	75.511	Report	
2023	August 13	34	Michael McDowell	Front Row Motorsports	Ford	82	199.998 (321.866)	2:09:59	92.319	Report	

=== Notes ===
- 2021 and 2022: Race extended due to NASCAR Overtime.

=== Manufacturer wins ===
# Wins	Manufacturer	Years won
2	Chevrolet	2021, 2022
1	Ford	2023

== See also ==
- Brickyard 400
- NASCAR O'Reilly Auto Parts Series at Indianapolis Motor Speedway
- Grand Prix of Indianapolis
- IROC at Indy
