= 2021 FireKeepers Casino 400 =

NASCAR Cup Series race

Race details
- Race 25 of 36 in the 2021 NASCAR Cup Series
- Date: August 22, 2021
- Location: Michigan International Speedway in Brooklyn, Michigan
- Course: Permanent racing facility
- Course length: 2.0 miles (3.2 km)
- Distance: 200 laps, 400 mi (640 km)
- Average speed: 142.476 miles per hour (229.293 km/h)

Pole position
Driver	Kyle Larson	Hendrick Motorsports
- Grid positions set by competition-based formula

Most laps led
Driver	Kyle Larson	Hendrick Motorsports
- Laps: 71

Winner
No. 12	Ryan Blaney	Team Penske

Television in the United States
- Network: NBCSN
- Announcers: Rick Allen, Jeff Burton, Steve Letarte and Dale Earnhardt Jr.

Radio in the United States
- Radio: MRN
- Booth announcers: Alex Hayden and Jeff Striegle
- Turn announcers: Dave Moody (1–2) and Kyle Rickey (3–4)

The 2021 FireKeepers Casino 400 was a NASCAR Cup Series race held on August 22, 2021, at Michigan International Speedway in Brooklyn, Michigan. Contested over 200 laps on the two-mile (3.2 km) D-shaped oval, it was the 25th race of the 2021 NASCAR Cup Series season.

== Report ==
=== Background ===
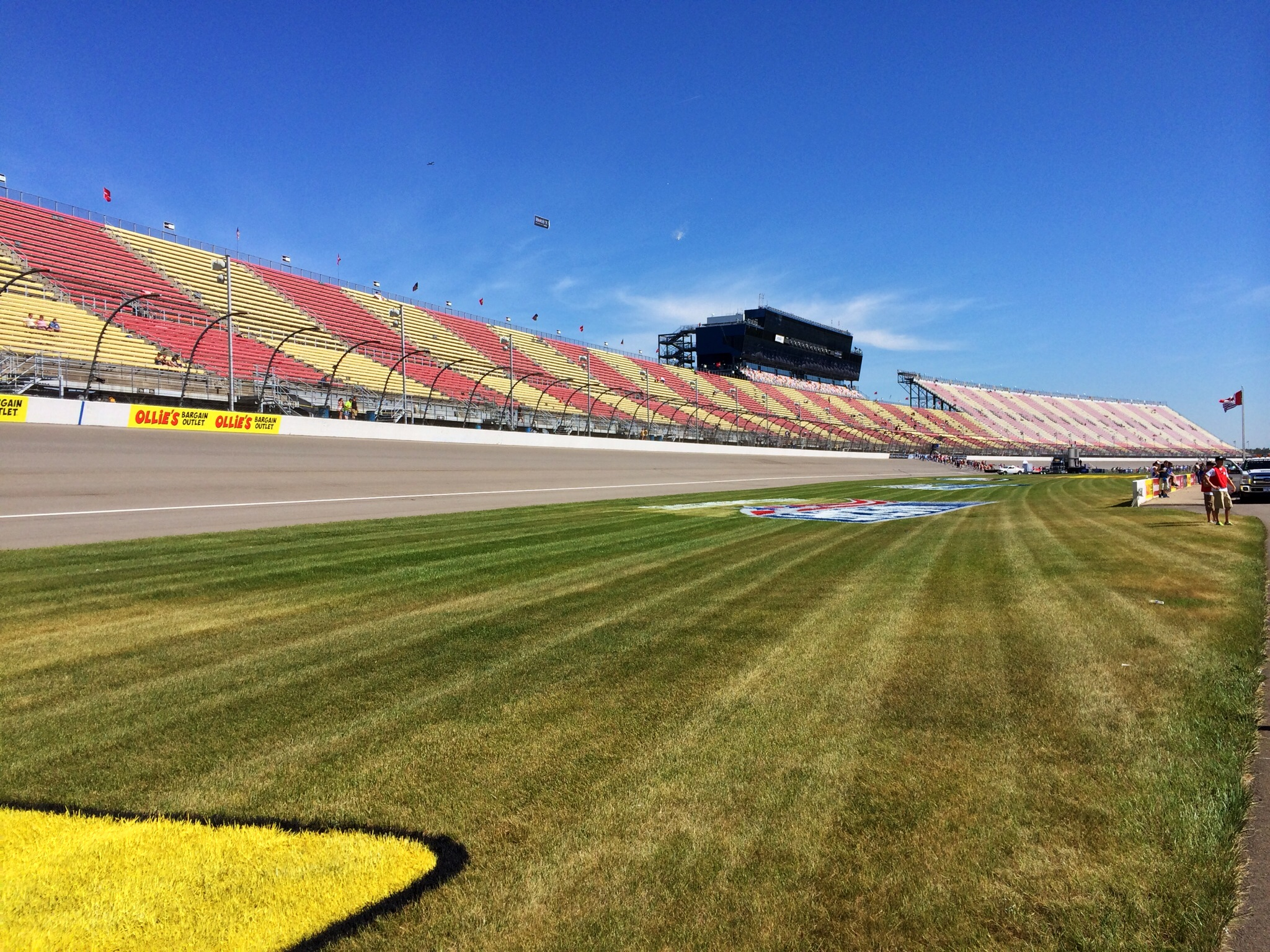
Michigan International Speedway, the track where the race was held.

The 2021 FireKeepers Casino 400 program cover.

The race was held at Michigan International Speedway, a two-mile (3.2 km) moderate-banked D-shaped speedway located in Brooklyn, Michigan. The track is used primarily for NASCAR events. It is known as a "sister track" to Texas World Speedway as MIS's oval design was a direct basis of TWS, with moderate modifications to the banking in the corners, and was used as the basis of Auto Club Speedway. The track is owned by International Speedway Corporation. Michigan International Speedway is recognized as one of motorsports' premier facilities because of its wide racing surface and high banking (by open-wheel standards; the 18-degree banking is modest by stock car standards).

Josh Berry replaced Corey LaJoie for the race due to COVID-19 protocols; LaJoie, then unvaccinated, had been close to a person testing positive for the COVID-19 from his Stacking Pennies podcast a week prior.

==== Entry list ====
- (R) denotes rookie driver.
- (i) denotes driver who are ineligible for series driver points.

No.	Driver	Team	Manufacturer
00	Quin Houff	StarCom Racing	Chevrolet
1	Kurt Busch	Chip Ganassi Racing	Chevrolet
2	Brad Keselowski	Team Penske	Ford
3	Austin Dillon	Richard Childress Racing	Chevrolet
4	Kevin Harvick	Stewart-Haas Racing	Ford
5	Kyle Larson	Hendrick Motorsports	Chevrolet
6	Ryan Newman	Roush Fenway Racing	Ford
7	Josh Berry (i)	Spire Motorsports	Chevrolet
8	Tyler Reddick	Richard Childress Racing	Chevrolet
9	Chase Elliott	Hendrick Motorsports	Chevrolet
10	Aric Almirola	Stewart-Haas Racing	Ford
11	Denny Hamlin	Joe Gibbs Racing	Toyota
12	Ryan Blaney	Team Penske	Ford
14	Chase Briscoe (R)	Stewart-Haas Racing	Ford
15	Joey Gase (i)	Rick Ware Racing	Chevrolet
17	Chris Buescher	Roush Fenway Racing	Ford
18	Kyle Busch	Joe Gibbs Racing	Toyota
19	Martin Truex Jr.	Joe Gibbs Racing	Toyota
20	Christopher Bell	Joe Gibbs Racing	Toyota
21	Matt DiBenedetto	Wood Brothers Racing	Ford
22	Joey Logano	Team Penske	Ford
23	Bubba Wallace	23XI Racing	Toyota
24	William Byron	Hendrick Motorsports	Chevrolet
34	Michael McDowell	Front Row Motorsports	Ford
37	Ryan Preece	JTG Daugherty Racing	Chevrolet
38	Anthony Alfredo (R)	Front Row Motorsports	Ford
41	Cole Custer	Stewart-Haas Racing	Ford
42	Ross Chastain	Chip Ganassi Racing	Chevrolet
43	Erik Jones	Richard Petty Motorsports	Chevrolet
47	Ricky Stenhouse Jr.	JTG Daugherty Racing	Chevrolet
48	Alex Bowman	Hendrick Motorsports	Chevrolet
51	Cody Ware (i)	Petty Ware Racing	Chevrolet
52	Josh Bilicki	Rick Ware Racing	Ford
53	Garrett Smithley (i)	Rick Ware Racing	Ford
77	Justin Haley (i)	Spire Motorsports	Chevrolet
78	B. J. McLeod (i)	Live Fast Motorsports	Ford
99	Daniel Suárez	Trackhouse Racing Team	Chevrolet
Official entry list

== Qualifying ==
Kyle Larson was awarded the pole for the race as determined by competition-based formula.

=== Starting Lineup ===
Pos	No.	Driver	Team	Manufacturer
1	5	Kyle Larson	Hendrick Motorsports	Chevrolet
2	9	Chase Elliott	Hendrick Motorsports	Chevrolet
3	12	Ryan Blaney	Team Penske	Ford
4	21	Matt DiBenedetto	Wood Brothers Racing	Ford
5	19	Martin Truex Jr.	Joe Gibbs Racing	Toyota
6	1	Kurt Busch	Chip Ganassi Racing	Chevrolet
7	18	Kyle Busch	Joe Gibbs Racing	Toyota
8	4	Kevin Harvick	Stewart-Haas Racing	Ford
9	11	Denny Hamlin	Joe Gibbs Racing	Toyota
10	48	Alex Bowman	Hendrick Motorsports	Chevrolet
11	17	Chris Buescher	Roush Fenway Racing	Ford
12	47	Ricky Stenhouse Jr.	JTG Daugherty Racing	Chevrolet
13	43	Erik Jones	Richard Petty Motorsports	Chevrolet
14	8	Tyler Reddick	Richard Childress Racing	Chevrolet
15	23	Bubba Wallace	23XI Racing	Toyota
16	6	Ryan Newman	Roush Fenway Racing	Ford
17	77	Justin Haley (i)	Spire Motorsports	Chevrolet
18	24	William Byron	Hendrick Motorsports	Chevrolet
19	22	Joey Logano	Team Penske	Ford
20	2	Brad Keselowski	Team Penske	Ford
21	14	Chase Briscoe (R)	Stewart-Haas Racing	Ford
22	42	Ross Chastain	Chip Ganassi Racing	Chevrolet
23	10	Aric Almirola	Stewart-Haas Racing	Ford
24	7	Josh Berry (i)	Spire Motorsports	Chevrolet
25	34	Michael McDowell	Front Row Motorsports	Ford
26	3	Austin Dillon	Richard Childress Racing	Chevrolet
27	41	Cole Custer	Stewart-Haas Racing	Ford
28	20	Christopher Bell	Joe Gibbs Racing	Toyota
29	52	Josh Bilicki	Rick Ware Racing	Ford
30	99	Daniel Suárez	Trackhouse Racing Team	Chevrolet
31	00	Quin Houff	StarCom Racing	Chevrolet
32	37	Ryan Preece	JTG Daugherty Racing	Chevrolet
33	53	Garrett Smithley (i)	Rick Ware Racing	Chevrolet
34	15	Joey Gase (i)	Rick Ware Racing	Chevrolet
35	38	Anthony Alfredo (R)	Front Row Motorsports	Ford
36	78	B. J. McLeod	Live Fast Motorsports	Ford
37	51	Cody Ware (i)	Petty Ware Racing	Chevrolet
Official starting lineup

== Race ==
=== Stage Results ===
Stage One Laps: 60

Pos	No	Driver	Team	Manufacturer	Points
1	9	Chase Elliott	Hendrick Motorsports	Chevrolet	10
2	5	Kyle Larson	Hendrick Motorsports	Chevrolet	9
3	3	Austin Dillon	Richard Childress Racing	Chevrolet	8
4	11	Denny Hamlin	Joe Gibbs Racing	Toyota	7
5	24	William Byron	Hendrick Motorsports	Chevrolet	6
6	22	Joey Logano	Team Penske	Ford	5
7	21	Matt DiBenedetto	Wood Brothers Racing	Ford	4
8	1	Kurt Busch	Chip Ganassi Racing	Chevrolet	3
9	18	Kyle Busch	Joe Gibbs Racing	Toyota	2
10	2	Brad Keselowski	Team Penske	Ford	1
Official stage one results

Stage Two Laps: 60

Pos	No	Driver	Team	Manufacturer	Points
1	18	Kyle Busch	Joe Gibbs Racing	Toyota	10
2	20	Christopher Bell	Joe Gibbs Racing	Toyota	9
3	5	Kyle Larson	Hendrick Motorsports	Chevrolet	8
4	9	Chase Elliott	Hendrick Motorsports	Chevrolet	7
5	11	Denny Hamlin	Joe Gibbs Racing	Toyota	6
6	3	Austin Dillon	Richard Childress Racing	Chevrolet	5
7	2	Brad Keselowski	Team Penske	Ford	4
8	8	Tyler Reddick	Richard Childress Racing	Chevrolet	3
9	24	William Byron	Hendrick Motorsports	Chevrolet	2
10	21	Matt DiBenedetto	Wood Brothers Racing	Ford	1
Official stage two results

=== Final Stage Results ===
Stage Three Laps: 80

Pos	Grid	No	Driver	Team	Manufacturer	Laps	Points
1	3	12	Ryan Blaney	Team Penske	Ford	200	40
2	18	24	William Byron	Hendrick Motorsports	Chevrolet	200	43
3	1	5	Kyle Larson	Hendrick Motorsports	Chevrolet	200	51
4	6	1	Kurt Busch	Chip Ganassi Racing	Chevrolet	200	36
5	9	11	Denny Hamlin	Joe Gibbs Racing	Toyota	200	45
6	4	21	Matt DiBenedetto	Wood Brothers Racing	Ford	200	36
7	7	18	Kyle Busch	Joe Gibbs Racing	Toyota	200	42
8	2	9	Chase Elliott	Hendrick Motorsports	Chevrolet	200	46
9	20	2	Brad Keselowski	Team Penske	Ford	200	33
10	5	19	Martin Truex Jr.	Joe Gibbs Racing	Toyota	200	27
11	21	14	Chase Briscoe (R)	Stewart-Haas Racing	Ford	200	26
12	12	47	Ricky Stenhouse Jr.	JTG Daugherty Racing	Chevrolet	200	25
13	28	20	Christopher Bell	Joe Gibbs Racing	Toyota	200	33
14	8	4	Kevin Harvick	Stewart-Haas Racing	Ford	200	23
15	11	17	Chris Buescher	Roush Fenway Racing	Ford	200	22
16	10	48	Alex Bowman	Hendrick Motorsports	Chevrolet	200	21
17	23	10	Aric Almirola	Stewart-Haas Racing	Ford	200	20
18	13	43	Erik Jones	Richard Petty Motorsports	Chevrolet	200	19
19	15	23	Bubba Wallace	23XI Racing	Toyota	200	18
20	25	34	Michael McDowell	Front Row Motorsports	Ford	200	17
21	32	37	Ryan Preece	JTG Daugherty Racing	Chevrolet	200	16
22	30	99	Daniel Suárez	Trackhouse Racing Team	Chevrolet	200	15
23	27	41	Cole Custer	Stewart-Haas Racing	Ford	200	14
24	16	6	Ryan Newman	Roush Fenway Racing	Ford	200	13
25	17	77	Justin Haley (i)	Spire Motorsports	Chevrolet	200	0
26	24	7	Josh Berry (i)	Spire Motorsports	Chevrolet	200	0
27	37	51	Cody Ware (i)	Petty Ware Racing	Chevrolet	199	0
28	36	78	B. J. McLeod (i)	Live Fast Motorsports	Ford	198	0
29	14	8	Tyler Reddick	Richard Childress Racing	Chevrolet	198	11
30	31	00	Quin Houff	StarCom Racing	Chevrolet	196	7
31	29	52	Josh Bilicki	Rick Ware Racing	Ford	195	6
32	33	53	Garrett Smithley (i)	Rick Ware Racing	Ford	194	0
33	19	22	Joey Logano	Team Penske	Ford	188	9
34	35	38	Anthony Alfredo (R)	Front Row Motorsports	Ford	178	3
35	22	42	Ross Chastain	Chip Ganassi Racing	Chevrolet	152	2
36	26	3	Austin Dillon	Richard Childress Racing	Chevrolet	120	14
37	34	15	Joey Gase (i)	Rick Ware Racing	Chevrolet	32	0
Official race results

=== Race statistics ===
- Lead changes: 20 among 11 different drivers
- Cautions/Laps: 6 for 29
- Red flags: 0
- Time of race: 2 hours, 48 minutes and 27 seconds
- Average speed: 142.476 miles per hour (229.293 km/h)

== Media ==
=== Television ===
NBC Sports covered the race on the television side. Rick Allen, Jeff Burton, Steve Letarte and two-time Michigan winner, Dale Earnhardt Jr. called the race from the broadcast booth. Dave Burns, Parker Kligerman and Marty Snider handled the pit road duties from pit lane.

NBCSN
Booth announcers	Pit reporters
Lap-by-lap: Rick Allen; Color-commentator: Jeff Burton; Color-commentator: Steve Letarte; Color-commentator: Dale Earnhardt Jr.	Dave Burns; Parker Kligerman; Marty Snider

=== Radio ===
Radio coverage of the race was broadcast by Motor Racing Network (MRN) and simulcast on Sirius XM NASCAR Radio. Alex Hayden and Jeff Striegle called the race in the booth while the field was racing on the front stretch. Dave Moody called the race from a billboard outside of turn 2 when the field is racing through turns 1 and 2. Kyle Rickey called the race from a platform outside of turn 3 when the field races through turns 3 and 4. Steve Post and Kim Coon worked pit road for the radio side.

MRN
Booth announcers	Turn announcers	Pit reporters
Lead announcer: Alex Hayden; Announcer: Jeff Striegle	Turns 1 & 2: Dave Moody; Turns 3 & 4: Mike Bagley	Steve Post; Kim Coon

== Standings after the race ==
Drivers' Championship standings

	Pos	Driver	Points
	1	Kyle Larson	1,004
	2	Denny Hamlin	976 (–28)
	3	Kyle Busch	838 (–166)
	4	William Byron	833 (–171)
	5	Chase Elliott	820 (–184)
1	6	Martin Truex Jr.	789 (–215)
1	7	Ryan Blaney	787 (–217)
2	8	Joey Logano	772 (–232)
	9	Kevin Harvick	756 (–248)
	10	Brad Keselowski	729 (–275)
	11	Tyler Reddick	677 (–327)
	12	Alex Bowman	674 (–330)
	13	Austin Dillon	652 (–352)
	14	Kurt Busch	643 (–361)
	15	Christopher Bell	595 (–409)
	16	Matt DiBenedetto	557 (–447)
Official driver's standings

Manufacturers' Championship standings

Pos	Manufacturer	Points
1	Chevrolet	927
2	Ford	862 (–65)
3	Toyota	845 (–82)

- Note: Only the first 16 positions are included for the driver standings.
- . – Driver has clinched a position in the NASCAR Cup Series playoffs.

Previous race: 2021 Verizon 200 at the Brickyard	NASCAR Cup Series; 2021 season	Next race: 2021 Coke Zero Sugar 400
