= 2006 AMD at The Glen =

Race details
- Race 22 of 36 in the 2006 NASCAR Nextel Cup Series
- 2006 AMD at The Glen program cover
- Date: August 13, 2006
- Official name: AMD at The Glen
- Location: Watkins Glen International Watkins Glen, New York
- Course: Permanent racing facility
- Course length: 2.45 miles (3.943 km)
- Distance: 90 laps, 220.5 mi (354.86 km)
- Weather: Temperatures reaching up to 71.8 °F (22.1 °C); wind speeds up to 10.2 miles per hour (16.4 km/h)
- Average speed: 76.718 miles per hour (123.466 km/h)

Pole position
Driver	Kurt Busch	Penske Racing South
- Time: 1:11.727

Most laps led
Driver	Kurt Busch	Penske Racing South
- Laps: 38

Winner
No. 29	Kevin Harvick	Richard Childress Racing

Television in the United States
- Network: NBC
- Announcers: Bill Weber, Wally Dallenbach Jr. and Benny Parsons

The 2006 AMD at The Glen was a NASCAR Nextel Cup Series race that was held on August 13, 2006, at Watkins Glen International in Watkins Glen, New York. Contested over 90 laps on the 2.45-mile (3.94-kilometre) road course, it was the 22nd race of the 2006 NASCAR Nextel Cup Series. Kevin Harvick of Richard Childress Racing won the race.

There were only five drivers eliminated from the race; all due to racing accidents.

== Background ==
The layout of Watkins Glen International NASCAR uses.

Watkins Glen International (nicknamed "The Glen") is an automobile race track located in Watkins Glen, New York at the southern tip of Seneca Lake. It was long known around the world as the home of the Formula One United States Grand Prix, which it hosted for twenty consecutive years (1961–1980), but the site has been home to road racing of nearly every class, including the World Sportscar Championship, Trans-Am, Can-Am, NASCAR Sprint Cup Series, the International Motor Sports Association and the IndyCar Series.

Initially, public roads in the village were used for the race course. In 1956 a permanent circuit for the race was built. In 1968 the race was extended to six hours, becoming the 6 Hours of Watkins Glen. The circuit's current layout has more or less been the same since 1971, although a chicane was installed at the uphill Esses in 1975 to slow cars through these corners, where there was a fatality during practice at the 1973 United States Grand Prix. The chicane was removed in 1985, but another chicane called the "Inner Loop" was installed in 1992 after a fatal accident during the previous year's NASCAR Winston Cup event.

The circuit is known as the Mecca of North American road racing and is a very popular venue among fans and drivers. The facility is currently owned by International Speedway Corporation.

== Qualifying ==
Pos	No.	Driver	Make	Speed	Time	Behind
1	2	Kurt Busch	Dodge	122.966	71.727	0.000
2	9	Kasey Kahne	Dodge	121.845	72.387	-0.660
3	12	Ryan Newman	Dodge	121.642	72.508	-0.781
4	24	Jeff Gordon	Chevrolet	121.432	72.633	-0.906
5	48	Jimmie Johnson	Chevrolet	121.172	72.789	-1.062
6	7	Robby Gordon	Chevrolet	121.144	72.806	-1.079
7	29	Kevin Harvick	Chevrolet	120.779	73.026	-1.299
8	20	Tony Stewart	Chevrolet	120.614	73.126	-1.399
9	5	Kyle Busch	Chevrolet	120.609	73.129	-1.402
10	11	Denny Hamlin	Chevrolet	120.497	73.197	-1.470
11	8	Dale Earnhardt Jr	Chevrolet	120.290	73.323	-1.596
12	38	Elliott Sadler	Ford	120.277	73.331	-1.604
13	40	Scott Pruett	Dodge	120.229	73.360	-1.633
14	07	Clint Bowyer	Chevrolet	120.105	73.436	-1.709
15	61	Boris Said	Ford	120.080	73.451	-1.724
16	31	Jeff Burton	Chevrolet	120.059	73.464	-1.737
17	42	Casey Mears	Dodge	120.000	73.500	-1.773
18	32	Ron Fellows	Chevrolet	119.865	73.583	-1.856
19	25	Brian Vickers	Chevrolet	119.777	73.637	-1.910
20	6	Mark Martin	Ford	119.650	73.715	-1.988
21	99	Carl Edwards	Ford	119.530	73.789	-2.062
22	66	Jeff Green	Chevrolet	119.422	73.856	-2.129
23	21	Ken Schrader	Ford	119.383	73.880	-2.153
24	26	Jamie McMurray	Ford	119.312	73.924	-2.197
25	22	Dave Blaney	Dodge	119.291	73.937	-2.210
26	18	JJ Yeley	Chevrolet	119.276	73.946	-2.219
27	90	Marc Goossens	Ford	119.204	73.991	-2.264
28	4	Scott Wimmer	Chevrolet	119.189	74.000	-2.273
29	96	Terry Labonte	Chevrolet	119.083	74.066	-2.339
30	17	Matt Kenseth	Ford	119.072	74.073	-2.346
31	19	Bill Elliott	Dodge	119.033	74.097	-2.370
32	10	Scott Riggs	Dodge	118.974	74.134	-2.407
33	55	Michael Waltrip	Dodge	118.903	74.178	-2.451
34	15	Paul Menard	Chevrolet	118.823	74.228	-2.501
35	1	Martin Truex Jr	Chevrolet	118.595	74.371	-2.644
36	43	Bobby Labonte	Dodge	118.595	74.371	-2.644
37	01	Joe Nemechek	Chevrolet	118.502	74.429	-2.702
38	45	Kyle Petty	Dodge	118.367	74.514	-2.787
39	88	Dale Jarrett	Ford	118.202	74.618	-2.891
40	41	Reed Sorenson	Dodge	117.093	75.325	-3.598
41	16	Greg Biffle	Ford	86.583	101.868	-30.141
42	14	Sterling Marlin	Chevrolet	0.000	0.000	0.000
43	34	Brian Simo	Chevrolet	118.786	74.251	-2.524
Failed to qualify
44	49	Chris Cook	Dodge			
45	78	Max Papis	Chevrolet			
46	27	Tom Hubert	Ford			
47	37	David Murry	Dodge			
48	72	Dale Quarterley	Dodge			
49	92	Johnny Miller	Chevrolet			
50	02	Brandon Ash	Dodge			

== Race recap ==
Kurt Busch had the pole position for this race, in Penske Racing's No. 2 Dodge. Busch was seeking his first road course win of his Cup career, following numerous near-misses and his Busch Series win the previous day. Busch controlled the race early before being penalized for coming onto pit road when it closed due to an untimely caution. Busch was sent to the rear of the field and the race then got controlled by Tony Stewart and Kevin Harvick, who passed Stewart during the final three laps to win the race.

It was Harvick's first road course win of his career and the top-ten also ended with some road course ringer present; Robby Gordon finished fourth in his own car and Scott Pruett, a non-regular, finished sixth substituting for David Stremme in Chip Ganassi's No. 40 Dodge.

Post-race penalties were handed out in the aftermath of a final-lap incident between Boris Said and Ryan Newman. After Said and Newman tangled in the "inner-loop", several cars made attempts to avoid the collision. Said was penalized for "rough-driving" with his incident with Newman and for skipping the bus-stop, sending him from 6th place to 31st. Ron Fellows, who originally finished 10th, was sent to 32nd after also skipping the bus-stop. Michael Waltrip was sent from 15th place to the last driver one lap down after making avoidable contact with Kyle Busch on the final lap, and then skipping the bus-stop.

== Results ==
Pos	St	No.	Driver	Owner	Car	Laps	Status	Led	Points
1	7	29	Kevin Harvick	Richard Childress	Chevrolet	90	running	28	185
2	8	20	Tony Stewart	Joe Gibbs	Chevrolet	90	running	7	175
3	24	26	Jamie McMurray	Jack Roush	Ford	90	running	0	165
4	6	7	Robby Gordon	Robby Gordon	Chevrolet	90	running	0	160
5	21	99	Carl Edwards	Jack Roush	Ford	90	running	0	155
6	13	40	Scott Pruett	Chip Ganassi	Dodge	90	running	0	150
7	12	38	Elliott Sadler	Yates Racing	Ford	90	running	0	146
8	3	12	Ryan Newman	Roger Penske	Dodge	90	running	7	147
9	9	5	Kyle Busch	Rick Hendrick	Chevrolet	90	running	0	138
10	10	11	Denny Hamlin	Joe Gibbs	Chevrolet	90	running	0	134
11	16	31	Jeff Burton	Richard Childress	Chevrolet	90	running	0	130
12	40	41	Reed Sorenson	Chip Ganassi	Dodge	90	running	2	132
13	4	24	Jeff Gordon	Rick Hendrick	Chevrolet	90	running	1	129
14	14	07	Clint Bowyer	Richard Childress	Chevrolet	90	running	0	121
15	22	66	Jeff Green	Gene Haas	Chevrolet	90	running	0	118
16	19	25	Brian Vickers	Rick Hendrick	Chevrolet	90	running	0	115
17	5	48	Jimmie Johnson	Rick Hendrick	Chevrolet	90	running	1	117
18	11	8	Dale Earnhardt, Jr.	Dale Earnhardt, Inc.	Chevrolet	90	running	1	114
19	1	2	Kurt Busch	Roger Penske	Dodge	90	running	38	116
20	20	6	Mark Martin	Jack Roush	Ford	90	running	0	103
21	30	17	Matt Kenseth	Jack Roush	Ford	90	running	0	100
22	2	9	Kasey Kahne	Ray Evernham	Dodge	90	running	0	97
23	32	10	Scott Riggs	James Rocco	Dodge	90	running	0	94
24	36	43	Bobby Labonte	Petty Enterprises	Dodge	90	running	0	91
25	28	4	Scott Wimmer	Larry McClure	Chevrolet	90	running	3	93
26	39	88	Dale Jarrett	Yates Racing	Ford	90	running	0	85
27	31	19	Bill Elliott	Ray Evernham	Dodge	90	running	0	82
28	35	1	Martin Truex, Jr.	Dale Earnhardt, Inc.	Chevrolet	90	running	0	79
29	34	15	Paul Menard	Dale Earnhardt, Inc.	Chevrolet	90	running	0	76
30	38	45	Kyle Petty	Petty Enterprises	Dodge	90	running	1	78
31	15	60	Boris Said	Mark Simo	Ford	90	running	0	70
32	18	32	Ron Fellows	Cal Wells	Chevrolet	90	running	0	67
33	26	18	J. J. Yeley	Joe Gibbs	Chevrolet	90	running	0	64
34	23	21	Ken Schrader	Wood Brothers	Ford	89	running	0	61
35	17	42	Casey Mears	Chip Ganassi	Dodge	89	running	0	58
36	33	55	Michael Waltrip	Doug Bawel	Dodge	89	running	1	60
37	29	96	Terry Labonte	Bill Saunders	Chevrolet	81	running	0	52
38	41	16	Greg Biffle	Jack Roush	Ford	75	running	0	49
39	42	14	Sterling Marlin	Bobby Ginn	Chevrolet	64	crash	0	46
40	25	22	Dave Blaney	Bill Davis	Dodge	61	crash	0	43
41	43	34	Brian Simo	Front Row Motorsports	Chevrolet	61	crash	0	40
42	37	01	Joe Nemechek	Bobby Ginn	Chevrolet	61	crash	0	37
43	27	90	Marc Goossens	Yates Racing	Ford	58	crash	0	34

=== Race statistics ===
- Time of race: 2:52:27
- Average speed: 76.718 miles per hour (123.466 km/h)
- Pole speed: 122.966 miles per hour (197.895 km/h)
- Cautions: 10 for 22 laps
- Margin of victory: 0.892 seconds
- Lead changes: 14
- Percent of race run under caution: 24.4%
- Average green flag run: 6.2 laps

Previous race: 2006 Brickyard 400	Nextel Cup Series; 2006 season	Next race: 2006 GFS Marketplace 400
