= NASCAR Nationwide Series at Montreal =

Former NASCAR race series in Canada

NAPA Auto Parts 200 presented by Dodge (English)

NASCAR Nationwide Series
- Venue: Circuit Gilles Villeneuve
- Corporate sponsor: NAPA (UAP Canada)
- First race: 2007
- Last race: 2012
- Distance: 200.466 miles (322.618 km)
- Laps: 74

Stock car races in the now-NASCAR O'Reilly Auto Parts Series were held at the Circuit Gilles Villeneuve in Montreal, Quebec, Canada from 2007 to 2012. The race was known as NAPA Auto Parts 200 Presented by Dodge (French title: NAPA Pièces d'auto 200 présenté par Dodge) for sponsorship reasons.

The race as held from 2007 to 2012 were held in August and replaced Champ Car World Series and Atlantic Championship Grand Prix of Montreal. The Grand-Am Rolex Sports Car Series and NASCAR Canadian Tire Series held a support race in every edition, the latter race being called NAPA Autopro 100 and the former having changed its name every season.

The inaugural 2007 race was the first major NASCAR (as opposed to CASCAR or NASCAR Canadian Tire Series) race in Canada in several decades. The 2008 race was the first official NASCAR points race from one of NASCAR's top three series to utilize rain tires and windshield wipers.

The last race was in 2012 after the track promoter and NASCAR could not come to an agreement for the 2013 season due to the inability to schedule a top-level Cup Series event. Plans for return to the track were considered for the 2024 season as a replacement for the currently in-demolition Auto Club Speedway race, which would also bring Cup Series to the track, but the plans fell through and the event slot was given to Iowa Speedway, which for the now-Xfinity Series saw return to that track since 2019.

== Past winners ==
Year	Date	No.	Driver	Team	Manufacturer	Race Distance		Race Time	Average Speed (mph)	Ref
Year	Date	No.	Driver	Team	Manufacturer	Laps	Miles (km)	Race Time	Average Speed (mph)	Ref
2007	August 4	21	Kevin Harvick	Richard Childress Racing	Chevrolet	75*	203.175 (326.978)	3:08:29	64.671	
2008	August 2	5	Ron Fellows	JR Motorsports	Chevrolet	48*	130.032 (209.266)	2:51:36	50.149	
2009	August 30	60	Carl Edwards	Roush Fenway Racing	Ford	76*	205.884 (331.338)	3:49:16	53.869	
2010	August 29	09	Boris Said	RAB Racing	Ford	77*	208.593 (335.697)	3:17:31	63.349	
2011	August 20	9	Marcos Ambrose	Richard Petty Motorsports	Ford	74	200.466 (322.618)	2:51:42	70.025	
2012	August 18	31	Justin Allgaier	Turner Motorsports	Chevrolet	81*	219.429 (353.136)	3:07:58	70.043	

- 2007, 2009, 2010, & 2012: Race extended due to a Green-white-checker finish.
- 2008: Race shortened due to heavy rain.

=== Manufacturer wins ===
# Wins	Make	Years won	Ref
3	(United States) Chevrolet	2007, 2008, 2012	
3	(United States) Ford	2009, 2010, 2011	

== Race summaries ==
- 2007: The inaugural Busch Series race in Montreal ended in controversial fashion. Although many expected the road course aces to dominate over the regulars, Busch Series regular Kevin Harvick won in controversial fashion. After road course ringers such as Scott Pruett, Ron Fellows, Boris Said, and Patrick Carpentier dominated the early stages of the race, Australian rookie Marcos Ambrose dominated the second half of the race. But, in the final stages controversy happened; Robby Gordon in his #55 Camping World RV/Menard's car passed Ambrose for the lead just when a caution came out and during the caution Ambrose seemingly intentionally turned Gordon. Robby Gordon under caution rushed back to second place but NASCAR determined that Gordon made an illegal pass on Ambrose just as the caution came out and ordered him to 17th and listed Ambrose as first still. Robby Gordon having had a good car refused and was black-flagged when he expressed his displeasure by intentionally bumping Ambrose in a retaliatory contact. When the restart came out Robby Gordon refused NASCAR's orders to leave the track and intentionally spun Ambrose around and led the first position DQed allowing former teammate Kevin Harvick to win. Ambrose finished 7th. When Harvick won the race, when doing his burnout, he noticed Robby Gordon come up and do a burnout at the same time as if celebrating his victory. NASCAR fined Gordon $60,000, suspended him from the NASCAR Sprint Cup Pocono race the next day and put him on probation for the rest of the year.
- 2008: Marcos Ambrose was looking for another win driving in his last year for the Kingsford #59 car. Scott Pruett beat Ambrose for the pole position and led the first 13 laps of the race as the rain began as a small sprinkle. After the first caution, Pruett lost some speed and Ambrose took the lead. Ambrose dominated yet again and during the experiment run under a Montreal rain sprinkle Ambrose slid from the lead into the grass just as the pit stops began. He was not worried at first but Ron Fellows took the lead. The heartbreak came when Ambrose ended up in third place because of a black flag he received for accidentally speeding on pit road. He finished serving his penalty just as the race was red-flagged due to a heavy rain shower that affected the drivers' visibility too much for the race to continue. After 48 laps of racing Ron Fellows was declared the winner and received much applause from the fans being a Canadian driver. Fellows was emotional about his win because his childhood dream was to win at Circuit Gilles Villeneuve as a professional racer, having watched his own childhood hero and track namesake, Gilles Villeneuve, race there.
- 2009: Marcos Ambrose, with a new team, new sponsor, and new number (47), dominated once again leading nearly the entire race leading 60 of 75 laps. After a red flag for rain, Ambrose lost most of his speed. On a green-white-checkered finish attempt Ambrose noticed Carl Edwards trying to make moves for the win. Edwards had previously spun his tires on the restart and thus looked like he lost bid for the win but refired to rush to second during the attempt. For the last few laps Ambrose held off Carl Edwards, but at the final chicane his car took a little too much of the high curbs and lost momentum, letting Carl Edwards beat him to the line for the win. The race went chaotic with cheers, shock and celebration, fans feeling bad for Marcos and happy for Carl at the same time. In victory circle Carl Edwards said he was emotional on his win at one of the most famous tracks in the world, but still felt bad for Marcos and added a comment that Marcos Ambrose was the most talented road course driver he's ever seen. At this point Marcos Ambrose was the driver who had led the most laps at the Montreal races.
- 2010: Ambrose led most of the 2010 race but again suffered heartbreak. His battery failed after briefly spinning out, and his race ended in the garage. On a green-white-checkered finish Robby Gordon ran out of gas and thus handed the top three to Boris Said, Italian rookie Max Papis, and Jacques Villeneuve. On the final lap Max Papis reached Boris Said and in the final turn successfully passed Said. But Papis hopped over the curb and Said was able to re-pass him. They drag-raced to the finish line and Said beat Papis by a bumper. The race was considered a big upset since Boris Said had not had many good finishes in NASCAR previously and had focused more on teaching younger drivers than winning races himself. The finish resembled that of the 2009 race when Marcos Ambrose made the same mistake on the curb thus handing the win to Carl Edwards. This was the first time in 3 years that Robby Gordon raced in this event due to making amends and reforming with sports doctors for his famous altercation with Marcos Ambrose in 2007 at the same race.
- 2011: After almost five years of frustration Marcos Ambrose, changing teams to Richard Petty Motorsports in both Nationwide and Sprint Cup series, led the final stages of the race without a green-white-checkered attempt and when reaching the final turn he passed by the curb (which had been lowered due to complaints from drivers) successfully and thus held off the charging pack to reach the line first. The fans applauded for the road course driver after seeing his heartbreak in his past at Montreal. Ambrose gave a "comeback" performance at the race because at the beginning he almost crashed out after slight contact with Jacques Villeneuve but held on to repair his car's bruises and come back through the field to win.
- 2012: The fans were hoping that a Canadian driver would win the race since American drivers had dominated the races at Montreal except for one (Marcos Ambrose from Australia). After Danica Patrick's car was damaged due to a shoe being thrown on the track by a fan for no apparent reason, Jacques Villeneuve rose to the lead for the final laps, but on the last lap the Canadian fans once again saw a heartbreak. Jacques was told to save fuel but soon his gas tank was almost empty and he began to slow. American driver Justin Allgaier slipped past him in the final turns and held off the other drivers for the win. Villeneuve, who ended up third, was upset with the finish; he claimed that Allgaier shoved him around to win and maintained that he should have won the race. The fan that tossed the shoe at Danica Patrick was exiled from the race as a punishment, fined $298,000 for interfering with the race and was later arrested.

== Demise ==
In 2012 NASCAR determined that for an indefinite time they will not race at Montreal in the NNS starting in 2013; thus the NASCAR event is currently defunct. This was due to the race promoter deeming the event unprofitable unless it could be turned into a top-level NASCAR Sprint Cup event. Under the impression that NASCAR would not be willing to schedule this, the promoter pulled the plug and the 2013 race was canceled, replaced by an event at Mid-Ohio Sports Car Course.
