= Ron Fellows =

Canadian racing driver

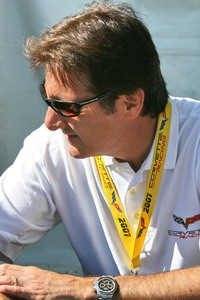
- Fellows in 2007
- Nationality: (Canada) Canadian
- Born: Ronald Charles Fellows; September 28, 1959 (age 67) Windsor, Ontario, Canada
- Achievements: 2001 24 Hours of Daytona winner 2002, 2003, 2004 ALMS GTS class champion 2001, 2002 24 Hours of Le Mans GTS class winner 2002, 2003, 2004 12 Hours of Sebring GTS class winner 2008 12 Hours of Sebring GT1 class winner

NASCAR Cup Series career
- 25 races run over 16 years
- 2013 position: 44th
- Best finish: 43rd (2007)
- First race: 1995 The Bud At The Glen (Watkins Glen)
- Last race: 2013 Cheez-It 355 at The Glen (Watkins Glen)
| Wins | Top tens | Poles |
|---|---|---|
| 0 | 5 | 0 |

NASCAR O'Reilly Auto Parts Series career
- 25 races run over 14 years
- 2013 position: 123rd
- Best finish: 39th (2011)
- First race: 1997 Lysol 200 (Watkins Glen)
- Last race: 2013 Nationwide Children's Hospital 200 (Mid-Ohio)
- First win: 1998 Lysol 200 (Watkins Glen)
- Last win: 2008 NAPA Auto Parts 200 (Montreal)
| Wins | Top tens | Poles |
|---|---|---|
| 4 | 15 | 2 |

NASCAR FedEx Freight Truck Series career
- 15 races run over 4 years
- Best finish: 35th (1999)
- First race: 1997 Pronto Auto Parts 400K (Texas)
- Last race: 2000 Bully Hill Vineyards 150 (Watkins Glen)
- First win: 1997 Parts America 150 (Watkins Glen)
- Last win: 1999 Bully Hill Vineyards 150 (Watkins Glen)
| Wins | Top tens | Poles |
|---|---|---|
| 2 | 5 | 3 |
- Statistics up to date as of November 17, 2013.

Ronald Charles Fellows CM (born September 28, 1959) is a Canadian former auto racing driver. A long-term Corvette factory driver, Fellows won the 24 Hours of Daytona overall in 2001, the 24 Hours of Le Mans twice in class and the 12 Hours of Sebring four times in class. He is a three-time American Le Mans Series champion, winning the GTS title back-to-back in 2002, 2003 and 2004.

Adjacently, Fellows won races in two of NASCAR's top three divisions as a road course ringer.

== Early career ==
Fellows was born in Windsor, Ontario, on September 28, 1959 and became interested in motorsports at four years old. After watching a Formula 1 race at Île Notre-Dame Circuit, Fellows began to idolize French-Canadian driver Gilles Villeneuve.

Fellows began his racing career in karts before moving on to Formula Ford 1600 and Formula Ford 2000. However, after running low on funds, he had to put his racing career on hold, becoming a gas pipeline worker for several years. Eventually, with the help of driving school instructor Richard Spenard, Fellows returned to racing, making his professional debut in 1986 in the Player's GM Challenge. In 1987, Fellows found success in the series, finishing second in the final standings following a 25-second time penalty at Shannonville Motorsport Park which saw Fellows go from first place to tenth place.

The following season, Fellows went into the seventh race as the points leader over Spenard. During the race, Fellows was involved in a wreck while running second place, knocking him out of the race and handing Spenard the race win and championship lead. Fellows was unable to regain the points lost in the final race of the season and finished runner-up in the standings for the second year in a row.

== Sports car racing ==
=== 1987–1997 ===
Fellows began racing select races in the Trans-Am Series beginning in 1987. In his debut race at Road Atlanta, Fellows finished fourth, catching the eye of team owner Jack Roush. Fellows ran three races for Roush Racing in 1988, finishing fifth at Road America and St. Petersburg and third at Mosport.

In 1989, Fellows returned to Roush Racing for three races. After two straight third place finishes at Road Atlanta and Road America, Fellows became victorious for the first time in the Grand-Am Series at Mosport. Fellows also returned to the Player's GM Challenge in 1989, winning the championship.

The following year, Fellows returned to Grand-Am, driving 11 races for Roush. Despite failing to find victory lane, Fellows ended the season tenth in points, finishing on the podium three times. In 1990, Fellows also participated in the Rothmans Porsche Turbo Cup Championship, clinching podium finishes at Shannonville and both Mosport races. He finished the season eighth in points.

=== 1998–2001 ===
In 1998, Fellows began his long association with GM's Corvette Racing program, with the historic Chevrolet Corvette C5R. He was also briefly involved with the development of the Cadillac LMP program. At the 2000 Rolex 24 at Daytona, he made history by setting the closest margin of victory in the history of the event, 31 seconds behind the winning Dodge Viper GTS-R of Olivier Beretta, Dominique Dupuy and Karl Wendlinger. Fellows and Corvette Racing fared better the next year, winning overall with Chris Kneifel, Johnny O'Connell, and Franck Fréon. Later that year, in June, Corvette Racing achieved its ultimate goal, a GTS class win in the 24 Hours of Le Mans, with Scott Pruett and O'Connell. Corvette Racing also captured the American Le Mans Series GTS title that same year.

=== 2002–2004 ===
In 2002, the Corvette C5R once again dominated the American Le Mans Series season, with a GTS class win at the 12 Hours of Sebring, along with a repeat of their 24 Hours of Le Mans GTS class victory. For the 2003 season, Corvette Racing won the American Le Mans Series GTS title with a very close win over the Prodrive Ferrari 550 team. In 2004, Corvette Racing continued to dominate the American Le Mans Series GTS class, including another GTS class win at the 12 Hours of Sebring. Fellows also competed in one NASCAR Cup Series race, at Watkins Glen, where he started 43rd and climbed his way up to second place.

=== 2005 ===
In 2005, Corvette Racing debuted the revolutionary Chevrolet Corvette C6R, at the 12 Hours of Sebring, with high expectations. A tire blow out erased their chances of capturing the GT1 (formerly GTS) win, with the Prodrive Aston Martin DBR9 taking the class win. However, later that year, Corvette Racing won their third 24 Hours of Le Mans class title in six years, beating the Aston Martin DBR9s with superior reliability and strategy. Although Fellows was not driving the winning Chevrolet Corvette C6R, he ran a respectable race in the No. 63 car.

=== 2006 ===
In 2006, Fellows returned for a full season with Corvette Racing. However, controversy surrounded the 2006 season as a result of IMSA's performance balancing. Corvette Racing's opposition during 2006 was the Prodrive Aston Martin team, which ran two full-season cars on Pirelli tires. The Pirelli tires were their undoing, as they were not as competitive as the Michelin tires on the Corvettes. Prodrive expressed their disdain for their disadvantage, and IMSA, the ALMS sanctioning body, introduced a number of penalties for the Corvette Racing team, to "balance" the performance. Despite this controversy, Fellows remained optimistic and still carried himself with the professionalism and class for which he is known. Despite the penalties, Corvette Racing prevailed, winning their fifth ALMS championship. Corvette Racing also won their fourth 24 Hours of Le Mans in six years. However, Fellows did not have the best luck in 2006, with the title going to the sister car driven by Jan Magnussen, Olivier Beretta and Oliver Gavin.

=== 2007 ===
Fellows returned to Corvette Racing in a limited supporting role in the American Le Mans Series. He was the third driver for the three long-distance races, and competed at Mosport, his home race. He sat out the other races, providing technical input and experienced advice to the team from behind the wall.

== NASCAR ==
Fellows has had various stints in the NASCAR Camping World Truck Series, Nationwide Series, and Sprint Cup Series, as a "road course ringer". He has two wins and three poles in the Camping World Truck Series, winning twice at Watkins Glen. He has had even greater success in the NASCAR Nationwide Series, where he has four wins and two poles in six starts. He was also the first non-American to win a NASCAR Nationwide Series event. As of November 22, 2011, Fellows held the record for most wins by a foreign-born driver in NASCAR's top three series (Sprint Cup, Nationwide, and trucks) with six – four in Nationwide and two in trucks.

Fellows made his NASCAR Cup Series debut in 1995 driving the No. 68 Chevy for Canaska Motorsports, owned by Victor Sifton. After he performed awfully during the race, Fellows stepped down from Cup racing to drive a part-time stint in the Craftsman Truck Series. Fellows did not return to the Cup series until 1998, driving the No. 96 Caterpillar Chevy for American Equipment Racing and Buzz McCall. Starting second alongside Jeff Gordon, Fellows had a promising start in the race, until he broke down from axle issues on lap 12, due to an oversight by a pit crew member, causing him to enter the garages for repairs and finish 42nd. He also ran an oval race in the same car-at Loudon which happens to be his single race he's run that is not a road course. He finished 36th after starting dead last.

During the late 1990s, Fellows was a regular winner at Watkins Glen in the Truck Series, winning in 1997 and 1999. His first truck win in 1997 was for Billy Hess' No. 48 AER Manufacturing team and his last truck win in 1999 was for NEMCO Motorsports. A year after winning his first truck race, Fellows won his first Busch series event on June 28, 1998, leading the most laps during the 1998 Lysol 200. After polesitter Boris Said spun on lap one, Fellows took the lead and led 54 of 82 laps. Fellows held off Mike McLaughlin to win the race. In 1999, Fellows nearly repeated the win but got passed by Dale Earnhardt Jr. on the final lap. The following season, Fellows won the Lysol 200 again, holding off Corvette teammate Butch Leitzinger.

In August 1999, Fellows had his career-best finish at Watkins Glen, driving the No. 87 Chevy for Joe Nemechek. In his only scheduled NASCAR Cup Series race for 1999, for the Frontier at the Glen, Fellows led three laps, but was beaten by Gordon on the final restart. The following year, Fellows ran the Watkins Glen race again. Qualifying was cancelled because of rain and, because of a qualifying rule where NASCAR decided the remaining eight positions by drawing, Fellows was controversially given the 40th starting spot over full-time drivers such as Scott Pruett and Dave Marcis (despite that Pruett and Marcis had faster cars than Fellows). Fellows ran in the top fifteen in the race before suffering an engine failure on lap 23. Fellows returned to the No. 87 in 2001 driving both road courses. He had a promising run at Sears Point Raceway, in which he led the most laps but finished 38th after crashing with 14 laps to go. He later led three laps at Watkins Glen during the 2001 Global Crossing at the Glen but finished 42nd after breaking his axles on lap 30 of 90. His only start in 2002 was at Sears Point Raceway, in which he finished 25th in his last race for Joe Nemechek.

In 2000, Fellows was in talks with Dale Earnhardt about driving for Dale Earnhardt Inc. full-time after 2001. It appeared that the full-time deal was sealed but Earnhardt was killed during the 2001 Daytona 500 prior to the agreement being fully consummated. In 2003 however, Fellows was remembered by Ty Norris, the DEI co-owner, and he was hired for the road races to drive the No. 1 car.

In 2003 at Infineon, during the Dodge/Save Mart 350, Fellows started third, and took advantage of a battle between Richard Childress Racing teammates Robby Gordon and Kevin Harvick to take the lead. Fellows led a lot of laps, and controlled the race with less than seventy laps to go. However, Fellows had his hopes end after being called onto pit road just after a caution came out with 38 laps to go. Restarting 31st, Fellows finished seventh. Though he has finished second twice at the Glen, Fellows stated in 2006 and 2013 that the 2003 Dodge Save-Mart 350 was the closest he had been to winning because he was dominant at Sonoma, while in the Watkins Glen finishes he lacked the proper speed.

In 2004, Fellows had one of his greatest performances. Because qualifying was cancelled due to rain, the lineup for the Watkins Glen event was decided by owner-points. Fellows started 43rd and finished second behind winner Tony Stewart. Fellows did challenge Stewart on the final restart but all of his speed was worn out by his charge through the field. Fellows later revealed, in a 2025 interview, that he was once again offered the No. 1 ride full-time for 2005 and beyond; he declined the offer because of his tremendous success with the Corvette Racing program, combined that he would have been one of the oldest rookies in the Cup Series, when it would have been harder for him to transition from sports-car racing to stock car racing.

The following season, Fellows contested the 2005 Telcel Motorola 200 in Mexico City, for the inaugural Busch Series race there, driving the No. 87 NEMCO Motorsports Chevy. He ended up finishing 41st after blowing an engine early on.

In 2005 and 2006, Fellows drove the No. 32 car for Cal Wells and PPI Motorsports at Infineon and Watkins Glen. After starting 43rd at Sonoma he finished eighth. In 2006, Fellows had originally finished 10th during the AMD at the Glen, but was penalized thirty seconds, hours after the race ended, for having illegally made passes through the "bus stop". The Tide team later closed up shop after the year was over, throwing Fellows out of his part-time ride.

In 2007, Fellows joined Hall of Fame Racing as driver for the road races. In a similar performance to the 2003 Infineon race, Fellows led a bit of the race after passing in a three-wide move, and lost the lead after having to pit during a caution. Fellows finished fifteenth. After starting 26th at Watkins Glen, Fellows moved up to fourth. Fellows probably would have had a shot at the win had he not gotten a speeding on pit road penalty on lap 55 and had to restart fortieth. But in a challenging rough drive through the field, Fellows finished fourth.

During 2006 and 2007, Fellows drove the No. 33 Busch series car for Kevin Harvick Incorporated, driving the road course races in Mexico City, Montreal, and Watkins Glen. In 2006, Fellows led one lap in Mexico City, but finished 33rd after blowing a radiator with less than ten laps to go. Fellows picked up a top-ten at Watkins Glen, finishing ninth. In 2007, Fellows renewed his deal for one more year to drive for Kevin Harvick Inc. in the No. 33 for the NBS road course events. In Mexico, Fellows did not have a promising race, finishing 33rd after blowing an engine with less than fifteen laps to go.

At the first NBS race at Montreal, Fellows drove a good race, starting third in the No. 33 Camping World.com car. After spinning out with less than nine laps to go, Fellows mounted his best drive of the race during the final green-white-checkered finish attempt; he drove from fourteenth place to fourth place in two laps. His boss, Kevin Harvick, ended up winning the race because of Robby Gordon and rookie Marcos Ambrose's altercation. The next week, at Watkins Glen, he controlled the race early, leading eleven laps, but ended up 24th after tangling with fellow road ringer Scott Pruett on the final lap.

In 2008, Fellows only raced in one event, driving his first race for JR Motorsports. Fellows, in his only start of 2008, won a rain-shortened NAPA Auto Parts 200 at Circuit Gilles Villeneuve in the No. 5 car at Montreal. He won after Marcos Ambrose was black-flagged for slipping across the soaked pit road too fast just before the red flag flew. This race made history as the first points paying race to be run on Goodyear rain tires. NASCAR races are generally postponed for rain. This victory marked Fellows' fourth NASCAR Nationwide Series win, all coming on road courses. This also tied him for first in the Nationwide Series for most road course wins. He is tied with Terry Labonte with four. Fellows was very emotional about his win because his lifelong childhood dream was to win a professional car race at Montreal since his childhood hero Gilles Villeneuve raced at the track when he watched from the stadium. As a result of his win, Fellows was given the No. 5 JR Motorsports crew for a multi-year deal. He drove for JR Motorsports through 2009 and 2010 for the road course races. Fellows did not have any promising races in 2009, but came back to the No. 88 team in 2010 to finish second at Road America.

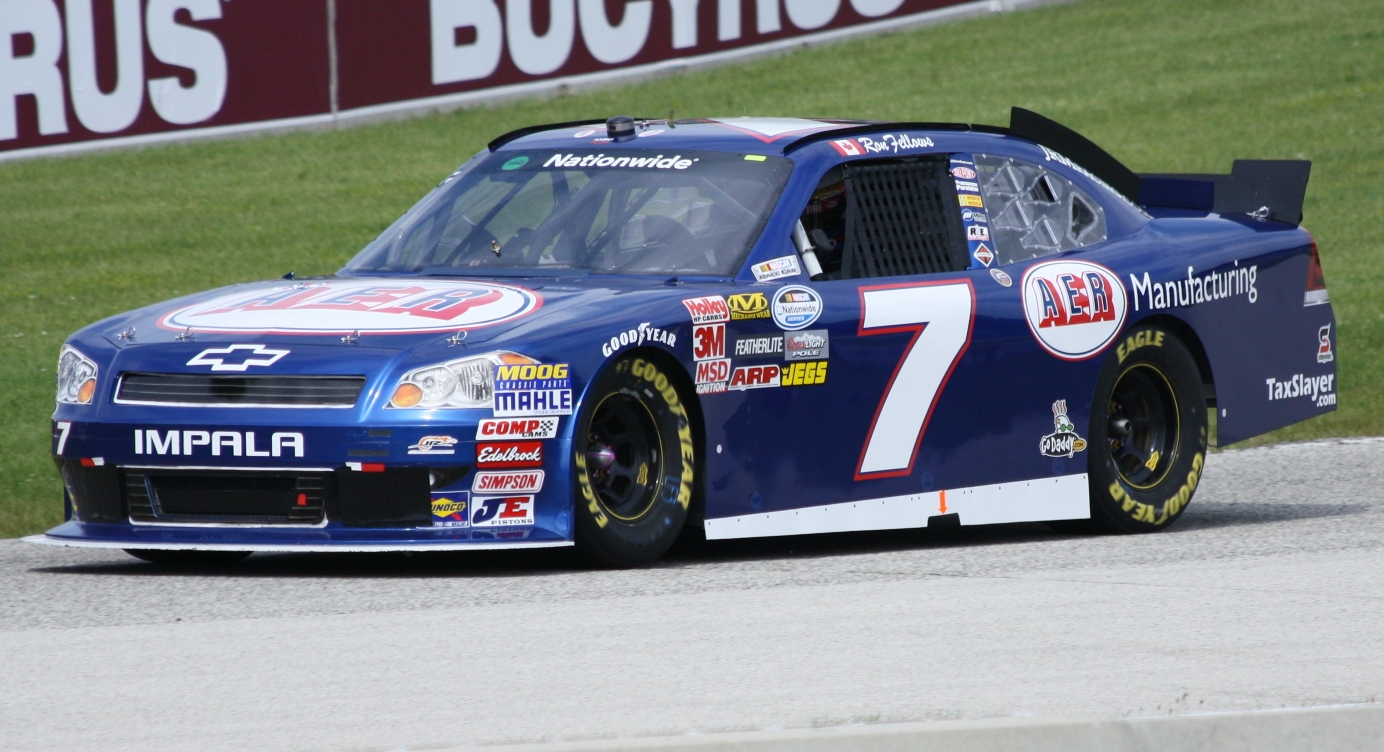
2011 Nationwide car at Road America

Fellows returned to JR Motorsports in 2011 for the road course races, driving the No. 7 AER car. He was in contention to win the Bucyrus 200 at Road America. He took the lead from Justin Allgaier, who had run out of fuel previously, passing Reed Sorenson in the process. However, NASCAR ruled that Fellows had passed both drivers under the caution flag too fast. Believing that Sorenson slowed due to also being out of fuel, Fellows drove past them at nearly race speed until he was leading the caution to the pace lap, though NASCAR rules stipulate that a driver must maintain reasonable speed while under the caution flag. As a result, Fellows was relegated to second place post-race, handing the win to Sorenson. Fellows said post-race that he should have won, although a year later, he admitted in a pre-race interview that NASCAR made the right call.

During 2010 and 2011, Fellows drove the No. 36 car for Tommy Baldwin Racing in the Cup series, but only at Watkins Glen. After running most of the 2010 Heluva Good at the Glen in the top twenty, Fellows suffered a blown engine and finished 40th. In 2011, Fellows only ran at Watkins Glen, driving the No. 36 Golden Corral car for Baldwin. Fellows wasn't much of a factor in the race. While running 25th on the final lap, Fellows got tangled in a final-lap crash involving David Ragan, and David Reutimann, crashing head-on into a barrier in the esses. He finished 30th.

The next year, Fellows could not land a ride for the Sprint Cup Series but ran the Nationwide Series road course races for JR Motorsports. Fellows led four laps at Road America and finished third. He finished fifth at Watkins Glen and fifth in Montreal. In 2013, Fellows ran his last race with JRM at the inaugural race in Mid-Ohio before parting ways with the team at year's end.

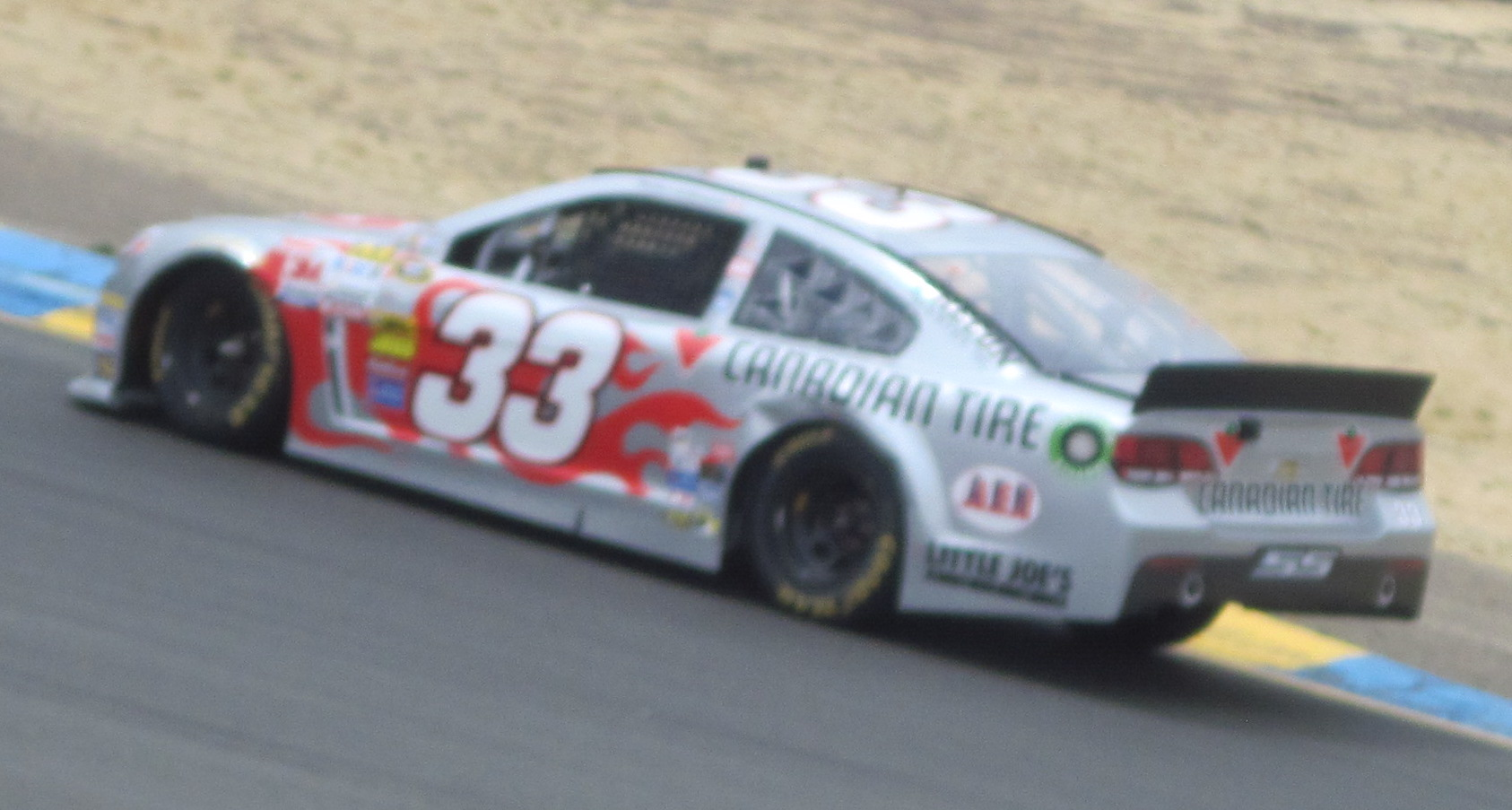
Fellows during the 2013 Toyota/Save Mart 350

Fellows returned to the Cup Series in 2013. He drove the No. 33 car for Circle Sport Racing. His best finish was at Infineon Raceway, when he finished 22nd.

== Awards ==
- Fellows was inducted to the Trans-Am Series Hall of Fame in 2025.

== Personal life ==
Fellows is married to Lynda Fellows and has three kids: Lyndsay, Sam, and Patrick Fellows. Fellows is a close friend of Dale Earnhardt Jr., whom he has previously driven for in the NASCAR Nationwide Series. Jacques Villeneuve, who was a student in a racing school with Fellows, is also a close friend.

His son Sam has also followed him into motorsport, becoming a racing driver.

Besides his racing career, Fellows owns a corporate business chain, the Ron Fellows Performance Driving Schools, and is one of the owners of car brand Corvette as well as Corvette's racing operations. He also owns a charity called the Sunoco-Ron Fellows Karting Championship, to help young kids become race-car drivers.

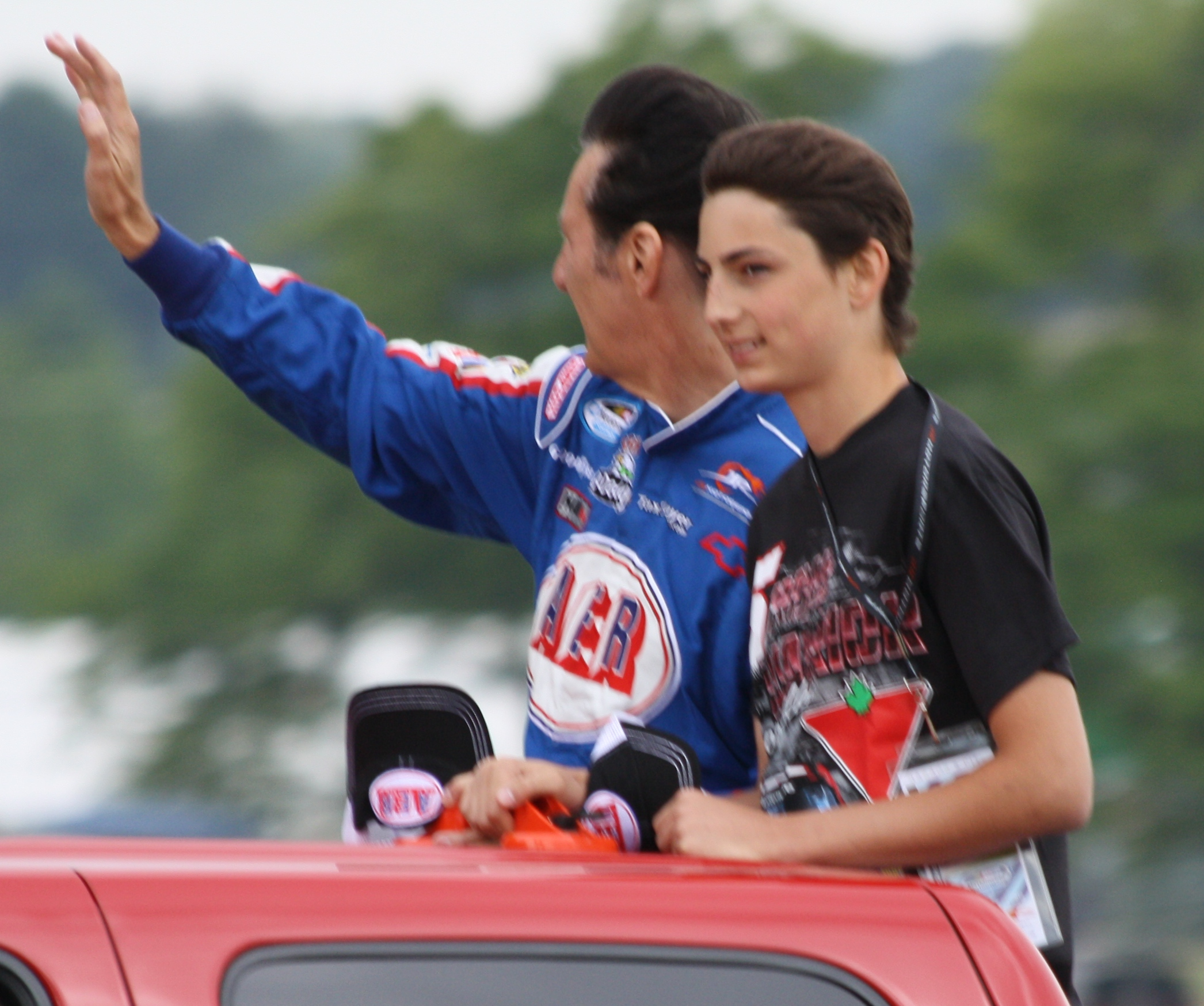
Fellows at Road America in 2012 with his youngest son

GM created the Ron Fellows edition Corvette Z06 in 2007, with a signature trim package. It features unique white paint and "grand sport" hash marks on the front left fender.

Fellows also supports many charities and programs and, like many Canadians, he has a deep passion for hockey, especially the Toronto Maple Leafs. He lives outside of Toronto with his wife and three children, and has a second home in a town near Las Vegas because his driving school is based there.

On June 1, 2011, it was announced that Fellows, along with partners Carlo Fidani and Allan Boughton, had formed Canadian Motorsport Ventures Ltd., which had just completed the purchase of Mosport International Raceway, north of Bowmanville, Ontario, Canada.

On December 31, 2019, as part of the New Year Honours, Fellows was awarded the Order of Canada, for "outstanding work in multi-disciplinary roles in motor-racing".

== Motorsports career results ==
=== NASCAR ===
(key) (Bold – Pole position awarded by qualifying time. Italics – Pole position earned by points standings or practice time. * – Most laps led.)

==== Sprint Cup Series ====
NASCAR Sprint Cup Series results
| Year | Team | No. | Make | 1 | 2 | 3 | 4 | 5 | 6 | 7 | 8 | 9 | 10 | 11 | 12 | 13 | 14 | 15 | 16 | 17 | 18 | 19 | 20 | 21 | 22 | 23 | 24 | 25 | 26 | 27 | 28 | 29 | 30 | 31 | 32 | 33 | 34 | 35 | 36 | NSCC | Pts | Ref |
|---|---|---|---|---|---|---|---|---|---|---|---|---|---|---|---|---|---|---|---|---|---|---|---|---|---|---|---|---|---|---|---|---|---|---|---|---|---|---|---|---|---|---|
| 1995 | Canaska Racing | 68 | Ford | DAY | CAR | RCH | ATL | DAR | BRI | NWS | MAR | TAL | SON | CLT | DOV | POC | MCH | DAY | NHA | POC | TAL | IND | GLN; 35 | MCH | BRI | DAR | RCH | DOV | MAR | NWS | CLT | CAR | PHO | ATL | | | | | | 63rd | 58 | |
| 1998 | American Equipment Racing | 96 | Chevy | DAY | CAR | LVS | ATL | DAR | BRI | TEX | MAR | TAL | CAL | CLT | DOV | RCH | MCH | POC | SON | NHA | POC | IND | GLN; 42 | MCH | BRI | NHA; 36 | DAR | RCH | DOV | MAR | CLT | TAL | DAY | PHO | CAR | ATL | | | | 63rd | 92 | |
| 1999 | NEMCO Motorsports | 87 | Chevy | DAY | CAR | LVS | ATL | DAR | TEX | BRI | MAR | TAL | CAL | RCH | CLT | DOV | MCH | POC | SON | DAY | NHA | POC | IND | GLN; 2 | MCH | BRI | DAR | RCH | NHA | DOV | MAR | CLT | TAL | CAR | PHO | HOM | ATL | | | 54th | 175 | |
| 2000 | NEMCO Motorsports | 87 | Chevy | DAY | CAR | LVS | ATL | DAR | BRI | TEX | MAR | TAL | CAL | RCH | CLT | DOV | MCH | POC | SON | DAY | NHA | POC | IND | GLN; 43 | MCH | BRI | DAR | RCH | NHA | DOV | MAR | CLT | TAL | CAR | PHO | HOM | ATL | | | 72nd | 34 | |
| 2001 | NEMCO Motorsports | 87 | Chevy | DAY | CAR | LVS | ATL | DAR | BRI | TEX | MAR | TAL | CAL | RCH | CLT | DOV | MCH | POC | SON; 38 | DAY | CHI | NHA | POC | IND | GLN; 42 | MCH | BRI | DAR | RCH | DOV | KAN | CLT | MAR | TAL | PHO | CAR | HOM | ATL | NHA | 59th | 96 | |
| 2002 | NEMCO Motorsports | 87 | Chevy | DAY | CAR | LVS | ATL | DAR | BRI | TEX | MAR | TAL | CAL | RCH | CLT | DOV | POC | MCH | SON; 25 | DAY | CHI | NHA | POC | IND | GLN | MCH | BRI | DAR | RCH | NHA | DOV | KAN | TAL | CLT | MAR | ATL | CAR | PHO | HOM | 69th | 88 | |
| 2003 | Dale Earnhardt, Inc. | 1 | Chevy | DAY | CAR | LVS | ATL | DAR | BRI | TEX | TAL | MAR | CAL | RCH | CLT | DOV | POC | MCH | SON; 7 | DAY | CHI | NHA | POC | IND | GLN; 38 | MCH | BRI | DAR | RCH | NHA | DOV | TAL | KAN | CLT | MAR | ATL | PHO | CAR | HOM | 56th | 200 | |
| 2004 | Dale Earnhardt, Inc. | 1 | Chevy | DAY | CAR | LVS | ATL | DAR | BRI | TEX | MAR | TAL | CAL | RCH | CLT | DOV | POC | MCH | SON | DAY | CHI | NHA | POC | IND | GLN; 2 | MCH | BRI | CAL | RCH | NHA | DOV | TAL | KAN | CLT | MAR | ATL | PHO | DAR | HOM | 67th | 170 | |
| 2005 | PPI Motorsports | 32 | Chevy | DAY | CAL | LVS | ATL | BRI | MAR | TEX | PHO | TAL | DAR | RCH | CLT | DOV | POC | MCH | SON; 8 | DAY | CHI | NHA | POC | IND | GLN; 25 | MCH | BRI | CAL | RCH | NHA | DOV | TAL | KAN | CLT | MAR | ATL | TEX | PHO | HOM | 59th | 230 | |
| 2006 | PPI Motorsports | 32 | Chevy | DAY | CAL | LVS | ATL | BRI | MAR | TEX | PHO | TAL | RCH | DAR | CLT | DOV | POC | MCH | SON; 37 | DAY | CHI | NHA | POC | IND | GLN; 32 | MCH | BRI | CAL | RCH | NHA | DOV | KAN | TAL | CLT | MAR | ATL | TEX | PHO | HOM | 62nd | 119 | |
| 2007 | Hall of Fame Racing | 96 | Chevy | DAY | CAL | LVS | ATL | BRI | MAR | TEX | PHO | TAL | RCH | DAR | CLT | DOV | POC | MCH | SON; 15 | NHA | DAY | CHI | IND | POC | GLN; 4 | MCH | BRI | CAL | RCH | NHA | DOV | KAN | TAL | CLT | MAR | ATL | TEX | PHO | HOM | 43rd | 283 | |
| 2008 | Dale Earnhardt, Inc. | 01 | Chevy | DAY | CAL | LVS | ATL | BRI | MAR | TEX | PHO | TAL | RCH | DAR | CLT | DOV | POC | MCH | SON; 29 | NHA | DAY | CHI | IND | POC | GLN; 13 | MCH | BRI | CAL | RCH | NHA | DOV | KAN | TAL | CLT | MAR | ATL | TEX | PHO | HOM | 56th | 200 | |
| 2009 | Phoenix Racing | 09 | Chevy | DAY | CAL | LVS | ATL | BRI | MAR | TEX | PHO | TAL | RCH | DAR | CLT | DOV | POC | MCH | SON; 27 | NHA | DAY | CHI | IND | POC | GLN; 29 | MCH | BRI | ATL | RCH | NHA | DOV | KAN | CAL | CLT | MAR | TAL | TEX | PHO | HOM | 56th | 168 | |
| 2010 | Tommy Baldwin Racing | 36 | Chevy | DAY | CAL | LVS | ATL | BRI | MAR | PHO | TEX | TAL | RCH | DAR | DOV | CLT | POC | MCH | SON | NHA | DAY | CHI | IND | POC | GLN; 40 | MCH | BRI | ATL | RCH | NHA | DOV | KAN | CAL | CLT | MAR | TAL | TEX | PHO | HOM | 72nd | 43 | |
| 2011 | Tommy Baldwin Racing | 36 | Chevy | DAY | PHO | LVS | BRI | CAL | MAR | TEX | TAL | RCH | DAR | DOV | CLT | KAN | POC | MCH | SON | DAY | KEN | NHA | IND | POC | GLN; 30 | MCH | BRI | ATL | RCH | CHI | NHA | DOV | KAN | CLT | TAL | MAR | TEX | PHO | HOM | 67th | 0 | |
| 2013 | Circle Sport | 33 | Chevy | DAY | PHO | LVS | BRI | CAL | MAR | TEX | KAN | RCH | TAL | DAR | CLT | DOV | POC | MCH | SON; 22 | KEN | DAY | NHA | IND | POC | GLN; 35 | MCH | BRI | ATL | RCH | CHI | NHA | DOV | KAN | CLT | TAL | MAR | TEX | PHO | HOM | 44th | 31 | |

==== Nationwide Series ====
NASCAR Nationwide Series results
| Year | Team | No. | Make | 1 | 2 | 3 | 4 | 5 | 6 | 7 | 8 | 9 | 10 | 11 | 12 | 13 | 14 | 15 | 16 | 17 | 18 | 19 | 20 | 21 | 22 | 23 | 24 | 25 | 26 | 27 | 28 | 29 | 30 | 31 | 32 | 33 | 34 | 35 | NNSC | Pts | Ref |
|---|---|---|---|---|---|---|---|---|---|---|---|---|---|---|---|---|---|---|---|---|---|---|---|---|---|---|---|---|---|---|---|---|---|---|---|---|---|---|---|---|---|
| 1997 | Phoenix Racing | 4 | Chevy | DAY | CAR | RCH | ATL | LVS | DAR | HCY | TEX | BRI | NSV | TAL | NHA | NZH | CLT | DOV | SBO | GLN; 25 | MLW | MYB | GTY | IRP | MCH | BRI | DAR | RCH | DOV | CLT | CAL | CAR | HOM | | | | | | 96th | 88 | |
| 1998 | NEMCO Motorsports | 87 | Chevy | DAY | CAR | LVS | NSV | DAR | BRI | TEX | HCY | TAL | NHA | NZH | CLT | DOV | RCH | PPR | GLN; 1 | MLW | MYB | CAL | SBO | IRP | MCH | BRI | DAR | RCH | DOV | CLT | GTY | CAR | ATL | HOM | | | | | 78th | 185 | |
| 1999 | NEMCO Motorsports | 87 | Chevy | DAY | CAR | LVS | ATL | DAR | TEX | NSV | BRI | TAL | CAL | NHA | RCH | NZH | CLT | DOV | SBO | **GLN**; 2 | MLW | MYB | PPR | GTY | IRP | MCH | BRI | DAR | RCH | DOV | CLT | CAR | MEM | PHO | HOM | | | | 85th | 180 | |
| 2000 | NEMCO Motorsports | 87 | Chevy | DAY | CAR | LVS | ATL | DAR | BRI | TEX | NSV | TAL | CAL | RCH | NHA | CLT | DOV | SBO | MYB | **GLN**; 1 | MLW | NZH | PPR | GTY | IRP | MCH | BRI | DAR | RCH | DOV | CLT | CAR | MEM | PHO | HOM | | | | 84th | 185 | |
| 2001 | NEMCO Motorsports | 87 | Chevy | DAY | CAR | LVS | ATL | DAR | BRI | TEX | NSH | TAL | CAL | RCH | NHA | NZH | CLT | DOV | KEN | MLW | GLN; 1 | CHI | GTY | PPR | IRP | MCH | BRI | DAR | RCH | DOV | KAN | CLT | MEM | PHO | CAR | HOM | | | 84th | 185 | |
| 2005 | NEMCO Motorsports | 87 | Chevy | DAY | CAL | MXC; 41 | LVS | ATL | NSH | BRI | TEX | PHO | TAL | DAR | RCH | CLT | DOV | NSH | KEN | MLW | DAY | CHI | NHA | PPR | GTY | IRP | | | | | | | | | | | | | 121st | 77 | |
| 2005 | Curb Racing | 42 | Chevy | | | | | | | | | | | | | | | | | | | | | | | | GLN; 42 | MCH | BRI | CAL | RCH | DOV | KAN | CLT | MEM | TEX | PHO | HOM | 121st | 77 | |
| 2006 | Kevin Harvick Incorporated | 33 | Chevy | DAY | CAL | MXC; 33 | LVS | ATL | BRI | TEX | NSH | PHO | TAL | RCH | DAR | CLT | DOV | NSH | KEN | MLW | DAY | CHI | NHA | MAR | GTY | IRP | GLN; 9 | MCH | BRI | CAL | RCH | DOV | KAN | CLT | MEM | TEX | PHO | HOM | 94th | 202 | |
| 2007 | Kevin Harvick Incorporated | 33 | Chevy | DAY | CAL | MXC; 32 | LVS | ATL | BRI | NSH | TEX | PHO | TAL | RCH | DAR | CLT | DOV | NSH | KEN | MLW | NHA | DAY | CHI | GTY | IRP | CGV; 4 | GLN; 24 | MCH | BRI | CAL | RCH | DOV | KAN | CLT | MEM | TEX | PHO | HOM | 85th | 328 | |
| 2008 | JR Motorsports | 5 | Chevy | DAY | CAL | LVS | ATL | BRI | NSH | TEX | PHO | MXC | TAL | RCH | DAR | CLT | DOV | NSH | KEN | MLW | NHA | DAY | CHI | GTY | IRP | CGV; 1 | GLN | MCH | BRI | CAL | RCH | DOV | KAN | CLT | MEM | TEX | PHO | HOM | 96th | 190 | |
| 2009 | JR Motorsports | 5 | Chevy | DAY | CAL | LVS | BRI | TEX | NSH | PHO | TAL | RCH | DAR | CLT | DOV | NSH | KEN | MLW | NHA | DAY | CHI | GTY | IRP | IOW | GLN; 5 | MCH | BRI | CGV; 35 | ATL | RCH | DOV | KAN | CAL | CLT | MEM | TEX | PHO | HOM | 94th | 213 | |
| 2010 | JR Motorsports | 88 | Chevy | DAY | CAL | LVS | BRI | NSH | PHO | TEX | TAL | RCH | DAR | DOV | CLT | NSH | KEN | ROA; 2 | NHA | DAY | CHI | GTY | IRP | IOW | GLN; 6 | MCH | BRI | CGV; 30 | ATL | RCH | DOV | KAN | CAL | CLT | GTY | TEX | PHO | HOM | 78th | 393 | |
| 2011 | JR Motorsports | 7 | Chevy | DAY | PHO | LVS | BRI | CAL | TEX | TAL | NSH | RCH | DAR | DOV | IOW | CLT | CHI | MCH | ROA; 2 | DAY | KEN | NHA | NSH | IRP | IOW | | | | | | | | | | | | | | 39th | 114 | |
| 2011 | JR Motorsports | 5 | Chevy | | | | | | | | | | | | | | | | | | | | | | | GLN; 7 | CGV; 11 | BRI | ATL | RCH | CHI | DOV | KAN | CLT | TEX | PHO | HOM | | 39th | 114 | |
| 2012 | JR Motorsports | 5 | Chevy | DAY | PHO | LVS | BRI | CAL | TEX | RCH | TAL | DAR | IOW | CLT | DOV | MCH | ROA; 3 | KEN | DAY | NHA | CHI | IND | IOW | GLN; 5 | CGV; 5 | BRI | ATL | RCH | CHI | KEN | DOV | CLT | KAN | TEX | PHO | HOM | | | 41st | 120 | |
| 2013 | JR Motorsports | 5 | Chevy | DAY | PHO | LVS | BRI | CAL | TEX | RCH | TAL | DAR | CLT | DOV | IOW | MCH | ROA | KEN | DAY | NHA | CHI | IND | IOW | GLN | MOH; 25 | BRI | ATL | RCH | CHI | KEN | DOV | KAN | CLT | TEX | PHO | HOM | | | 123rd | 0 | |

==== Craftsman Truck Series ====
NASCAR Camping World Truck Series results
| Year | Team | No. | Make | 1 | 2 | 3 | 4 | 5 | 6 | 7 | 8 | 9 | 10 | 11 | 12 | 13 | 14 | 15 | 16 | 17 | 18 | 19 | 20 | 21 | 22 | 23 | 24 | 25 | 26 | 27 | NCTC | Pts | Ref |
|---|---|---|---|---|---|---|---|---|---|---|---|---|---|---|---|---|---|---|---|---|---|---|---|---|---|---|---|---|---|---|---|---|---|
| 1997 | Hess Racing | 48 | Chevy | WDW | TUS | HOM | PHO | POR | EVG | I70 | NHA | TEX; 25 | BRI | NZH | MLW | LVL | CNS | HPT; 33 | IRP | FLM | NSV | **GLN**; 1 | RCH | MAR | SON; 11 | MMR; 22 | CAL | PHO | LVS | | 41st | 559 | |
| 1998 | Hess Racing | 48 | Chevy | WDW | HOM | PHO | POR | EVG | I70 | **GLN**; 33 | TEX; 7 | BRI | MLW | NZH; 31 | CAL | PPR; 35 | IRP | NHA | FLM | NSV | HPT; 31 | LVL | RCH | MEM | GTY | MAR | SON | MMR | PHO | LVS | 45th | 408 | |
| 1999 | NEMCO Motorsports | 87 | Chevy | HOM | PHO | EVG | MMR | MAR | MEM | PPR | I70 | BRI | TEX | PIR; 3 | **GLN**; 1 | MLW | NSV | NZH | MCH | NHA | IRP | GTY | HPT; 15 | RCH | LVS | LVL | TEX; 21 | CAL | | | 35th | 578 | |
| 2000 | NEMCO Motorsports | 87 | Chevy | DAY | HOM | PHO | MMR | MAR | PIR | GTY | MEM | PPR | EVG | TEX | KEN | GLN; DNQ | MLW | NHA | NZH | MCH | IRP | NSV | CIC | RCH | DOV | TEX | CAL | | | | 80th | 165 | |
| 2000 | Conely Racing | 7 | Chevy | | | | | | | | | | | | | GLN; 3 | | | | | | | | | | | | | | | 80th | 165 | |

=== ARCA Bondo/Mar-Hyde Series ===
(key) (Bold – Pole position awarded by qualifying time. Italics – Pole position earned by points standings or practice time. * – Most laps led.)

ARCA Bondo/Mar-Hyde Series results
| Year | Team | No. | Make | 1 | 2 | 3 | 4 | 5 | 6 | 7 | 8 | 9 | 10 | 11 | 12 | 13 | 14 | 15 | 16 | 17 | 18 | 19 | 20 | 21 | 22 | ABMHSC | Pts | Ref |
|---|---|---|---|---|---|---|---|---|---|---|---|---|---|---|---|---|---|---|---|---|---|---|---|---|---|---|---|---|
| 1997 | American Equipment Racing | 52 | Chevy | DAY | ATL | SLM | CLT; 36 | CLT | POC | MCH | SBS | TOL | KIL | FRS | MIN | POC | MCH | DSF | GTW | SLM | WIN | CLT | TAL | ISF | ATL | 157th | ? | |

=== 24 Hours of Le Mans results ===
| Year | Team | Co-Drivers | Car | Class | Laps | Pos. | Class Pos. |
|---|---|---|---|---|---|---|---|
| 2000 | (United States) Corvette Racing | (United States) Chris Kneifel (United Kingdom) Justin Bell | Chevrolet Corvette C5-R | GTS | 326 | 11th | 4th |
| 2001 | (United States) Corvette Racing | (United States) Scott Pruett (United States) Johnny O'Connell | Chevrolet Corvette C5-R | GTS | 278 | 8th | **1st** |
| 2002 | (United States) Corvette Racing | (United States) Johnny O'Connell (United Kingdom) Oliver Gavin | Chevrolet Corvette C5-R | GTS | 335 | 11th | **1st** |
| 2003 | (United States) Corvette Racing | (United States) Johnny O'Connell (France) Franck Fréon | Chevrolet Corvette C5-R | GTS | 326 | 12th | **3rd** |
| 2004 | (United States) Corvette Racing | (Italy) Max Papis (United States) Johnny O'Connell | Chevrolet Corvette C5-R | GTS | 334 | 8th | **2nd** |
| 2005 | (United States) Corvette Racing | (Italy) Max Papis (United States) Johnny O'Connell | Chevrolet Corvette C6.R | GT1 | 347 | 6th | **2nd** |
| 2006 | (United States) Corvette Racing | (United States) Johnny O'Connell (Italy) Max Papis | Chevrolet Corvette C6.R | GT1 | 327 | 12th | 7th |
| 2007 | (United States) Corvette Racing | (United States) Johnny O'Connell (Denmark) Jan Magnussen | Chevrolet Corvette C6.R | GT1 | 342 | 6th | **2nd** |
| 2008 | (United States) Corvette Racing | (United States) Johnny O'Connell (Denmark) Jan Magnussen | Chevrolet Corvette C6.R | GT1 | 344 | 14th | **2nd** |

== See also ==
- List of Canadian NASCAR drivers
