= 2010 Aaron's 499 =

Race details
- Race 9 of 36 in the 2010 NASCAR Sprint Cup Series
- 2010 Aaron's 499 program cover. "This is more than a race. This is Talladega Superspeedway."
- Date: April 25, 2010
- Official name: Aaron's 499
- Location: Talladega Superspeedway, Talladega, Alabama
- Course: Permanent racing facility
- Course length: 2.66 miles (4.28 km)
- Distance: 200 laps, 532 mi (856.171 km)
- Weather: Partly sunny with temperatures reaching up to 78.8 °F (26.0 °C); wind speeds up to 19 miles per hour (31 km/h)
- Average speed: 150.59 miles per hour (242.35 km/h)

Pole position
Driver	Jimmie Johnson	Hendrick Motorsports

Most laps led
Driver	Jeff Burton	Richard Childress Racing
- Laps: 28

Winner
No. 29	Kevin Harvick	Richard Childress Racing

Television in the United States
- Network: Fox
- Announcers: Mike Joy, Darrell Waltrip, and Larry McReynolds

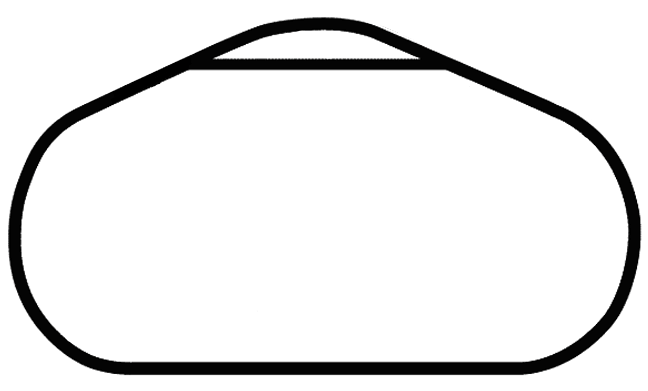
The layout of Talladega Superspeedway, the venue where the race was held.

The 2010 Aaron's 499 was the 9th race of the 2010 NASCAR Sprint Cup Series season, and the first of two Sprint Cup races held at Talladega Superspeedway in Talladega, Alabama. It started at 1 p.m. EDT on April 25, 2010. The race was televised on Fox and was also broadcast on MRN Radio at 12 p.m. After Carl Edwards and Ryan Newman previous crash, officials decided that they would change from the rear wing to the rear spoiler which debuted in the 2010 Goody's Fast Pain Relief 500. The race, which was extended by 12 laps, shattered numerous NASCAR records: it marked the first time under the modified green–white–checkered finish rules that a race had gone to the maximum three attempts allowed. There were eight caution flags, a record-setting 29 different leaders and a record-setting 88 lead changes. Kevin Harvick of Richard Childress Racing won the race, his first win of the season and his first since the 2007 Daytona 500, while the Earnhardt-Ganassi teammates of Jamie McMurray and Juan Pablo Montoya finished second and third.

== Race report ==
=== Practices and qualifying ===
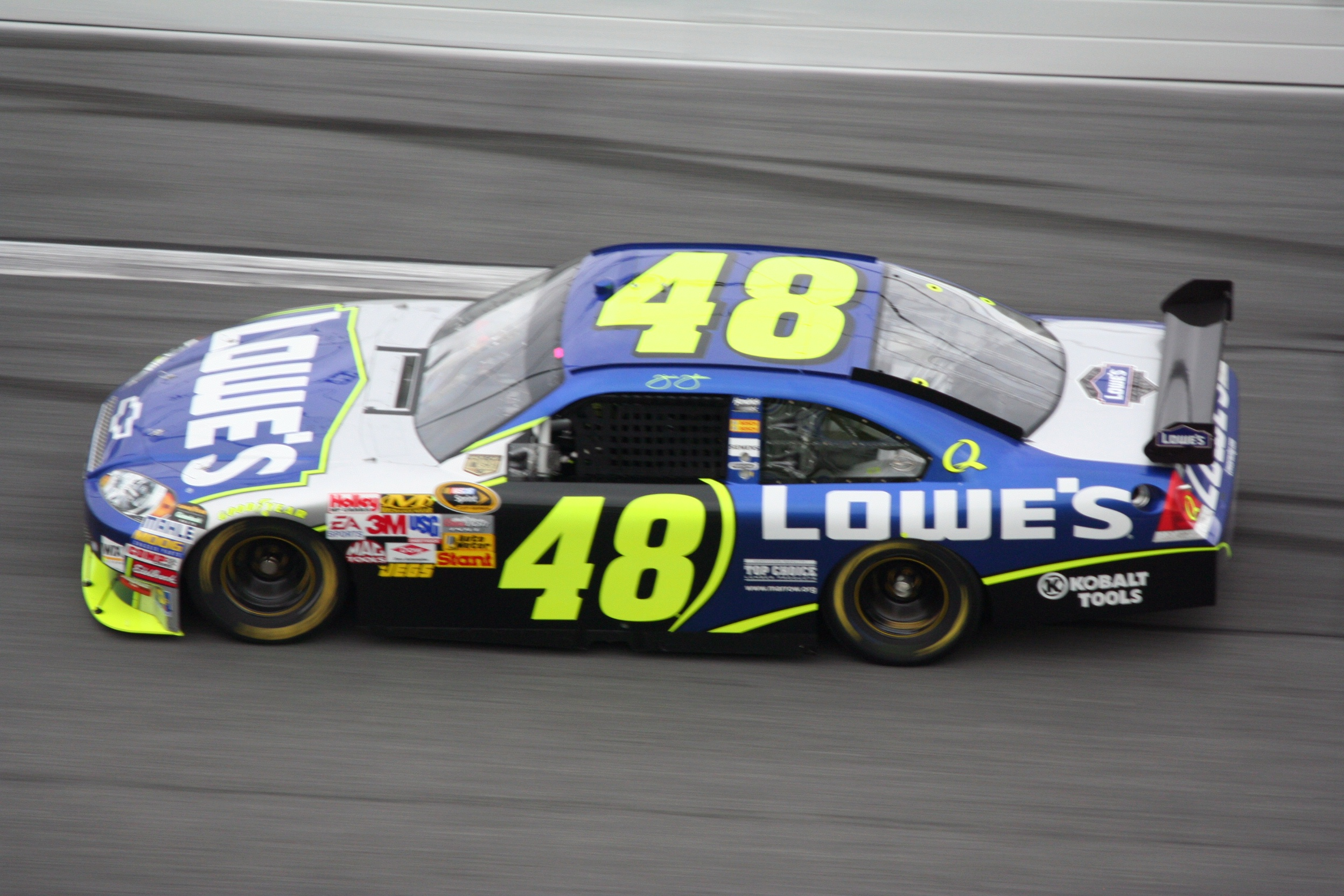
Polesitter Jimmie Johnson in 2008

On April 23, there were two practice sessions that began, with David Reutimann, Regan Smith, Jeff Gordon, Jeff Burton, and Marcos Ambrose posting the fastest times. The fastest in the final practice were Jeff Burton, Brad Keselowski, Mike Bliss, Denny Hamlin, and Dale Earnhardt Jr. In the final practice there were two caution flags – one after Ryan Newman spun on the back stretch after being tapped by Mark Martin and received major damage to his car, the other being when spotters noticed a small, black bird near the SAFER barrier, which a member of the safety team was able to grab. On April 24, qualifying was canceled because of severe weather in the area (which also rained out the Nationwide Series race of the weekend, causing that race to be rescheduled to April 25, right after the Sprint Cup race); Jimmie Johnson, as he was first in the standings, started on the pole. The drivers that failed to qualify were Aric Almirola and Terry Cook.

=== Race summary ===
To begin pre-race events, Reverend Mark Stokes of Alabama Raceway Ministries gave the invocation. Then, recording artist Brittini Black performed the national anthem. To start the engines, Mal Moore, director of athletics at the University of Alabama, gave the starting command.

Before the race, NASCAR decided to have a competition caution on lap 20, due to rains in the area the day before that had rained out the Nationwide Series race. Jimmie Johnson began the race with a good start, but Kyle Busch passed Johnson after receiving assistance from Jeff Burton . Joey Logano, Kyle Busch's teammate, became the leader after passing Busch, but on lap 4, Matt Kenseth passed him. Kenseth led only one lap until Kevin Harvick claimed the lead. Harvick's vacated first position was filled by Denny Hamlin after he fell to second. On lap 8, Tony Stewart became the leader, but was passed by Elliott Sadler on the ninth lap. David Ragan became the leader after Sadler fell to the second position.

After leading three laps, Ragan was passed by Kurt Busch. Two laps later, Joey Logano passed Kurt Busch for the lead. Logano led until lap 19, when Jeff Burton passed him. A lap later, the aforementioned competition caution was thrown. Robby Gordon stayed out of pit road to receive the lead, but two laps later Kurt Busch passed him when he was going to pit road.

At the restart on lap 24, Kurt Busch led the field to the green flag. Brian Vickers passed Kurt Busch for the lead on lap 26. Vickers led for three laps, until lap 29, when Hamlin passed him for the lead. One lap later, Dale Earnhardt Jr. passed Hamlin. Michael Waltrip passed Earnhardt and claimed the lead a lap later on lap 31. Two laps later, on lap 33, A. J. Allmendinger passed Waltrip, but on the next lap, Waltrip reclaimed the lead. On lap 38, Jimmie Johnson passed Waltrip for the lead, but on lap 39, with a push from Vickers, Earnhardt passed Johnson. On lap 42, Jeff Burton passed Earnhardt, but Earnhardt repassed him on the next lap. On the next lap, Kyle Busch passed Earnhardt Jr. for the lead, but Busch led only one lap until Earnhardt passed him. On lap 46, Kurt Busch passed Earnhardt for the lead. Two laps later, Brad Keselowski passed Busch for the lead. On lap 50, David Ragan passed Keselowski for the lead, but he led only one lap until Jeff Burton passed him.

Ragan led eight laps until Sam Hornish Jr. passed him. On lap 60, Kyle Busch passed Hornish Jr. for the lead. Two laps later Brian Vickers passed Busch to lead. On lap 64, Jimmie Johnson passed Vickers to lead his first lap of the day. A lap later, Burton passed Johnson for the lead. Laps 65 and 66 saw the field cycle through green flag pit stops. On lap 66, Denny Hamlin moved into the lead. One lap later, Johnson retook the lead. On lap 68, Jeff Gordon passed Johnson for the lead, but a lap later Johnson reclaimed the lead. On lap 70, Michael Waltrip repassed Johnson. One lap later, Logano passed Waltrip to lead. Regan Smith, on lap 71, passed Logano for the lead. On lap 72, Kyle Busch passed Smith to lead. On lap 75, Elliott Sadler passed Busch for the lead.

On lap 77, the second caution happened when Hamlin spun in the tri-oval. He did not receive any serious damage.

On lap 79, Kurt Busch claimed the lead coming off pit road. On the lap 80 restart, he led the field back to the green flag. A lap later, Kurt was passed by Kyle Busch. On lap 82, Jeff Gordon repassed both Busches. A lap later, Gordon was passed by David Reutimann. On lap 84, the third caution was thrown for a large crash in the tri-oval exit. It started when Kyle Busch, on the highside, turned Johnny Sauter into the side of Kurt Busch, starting a chain reaction as several cars bounced off each other. The other cars with damage were Matt Kenseth, Michael Waltrip, Max Papis, David Stremme, Paul Menard, Sam Hornish Jr., and Elliott Sadler. Of the cars involved in the crash, Sauter was the only car that was unable to drive back to the pits. Papis, Sauter and Waltrip were the only three drivers who were unable to continue. Under the caution Ryan Newman and Travis Kvapil stayed out to lead a lap, but they ended up pitting anyway.

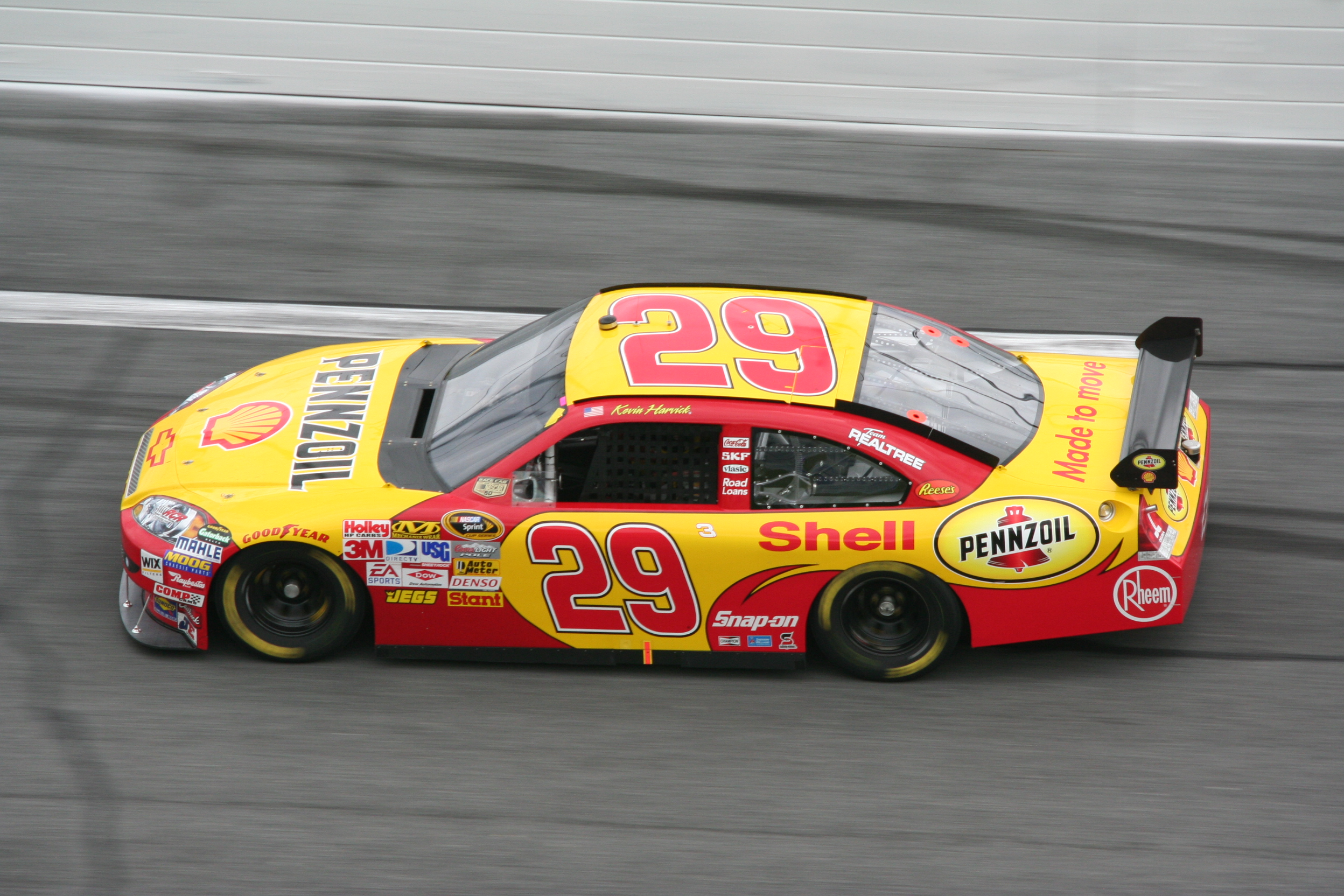
Race winner Kevin Harvick in 2008

On the restart, on lap 89, Jimmie Johnson led the field to the green flag. On the following lap, David Reutimann, with assistance from Jeff Gordon, passed Johnson, but Reutimann, on lap 91, was passed by Gordon. Gordon led until lap 92 when Kyle Busch repassed him. On lap 94, Kasey Kahne passed Busch to become the 25th leader in the race, but two laps later Regan Smith passed him for the lead. Kahne regained the lead one lap later. On lap 100, the fourth caution came out when Regan Smith's engine blew up.

There were 3 lead changes under caution; the drivers who led were Denny Hamlin, Mark Martin, and Greg Biffle. At the restart on lap 105, Biffle led the field to the green flag. A lead change happened on lap 106 with Hamlin passing Biffle. Two laps later, Joey Logano passed Hamlin, but on lap 111, he was passed by Brian Vickers. On the next lap, Logano reclaimed the lead from Vickers. On lap 113, Kyle Busch passed Logano, but after a lap of leading, he was passed by A.J. Allmendinger. Then, on lap 117, Johnson passed Allmendinger for the lead, but on the next lap Allmendinger reclaimed the lead.

Four laps later, on lap 122, Allmendinger was passed by Vickers for the lead. Vickers led until lap 130 when Hamlin passed him. On the next lap, Kyle Busch claimed the lead from Hamlin. Kyle Busch led nine laps until giving up the lead back to Hamlin. On lap 144, David Ragan claimed the lead from Hamlin, but Hamlin re-passed him one lap later, which broke the official record for lead changes. On lap 146, another cycle of green flag pit stops began as several drivers pitted. Robby Gordon and Kurt Busch were penalized for speeding during their stops. The motorsports record of 28 leaders was broken on lap 147 after Juan Pablo Montoya claimed the lead following pit stops. On lap 152, Denny Hamlin reclaimed the lead, but David Reutimann passed him on the following lap. On lap 157, Jamie McMurray passed Reutimann for the lead. Two laps later, Jeff Gordon passed McMurray, but on lap 160, McMurray reclaimed the lead from him. On lap 161, Jeff Burton passed McMurray for the lead. On lap 176, the fifth caution came out when David Reutimann spun Bobby Labonte out on the back straightaway. Jeff Burton pitted, giving the lead to McMurray on the restart.

On lap 181, McMurray was leading a single-file line of cars on the outside lanes, duelling with the drafting pair of Tony Stewart and Dale Earnhardt Jr. On lap 182, the sixth caution came out for a three car crash in the tri-oval. It started when Jimmie Johnson blocked Jeff Gordon in turn 3, forcing Gordon onto the apron, which bunched up a number of cars, causing Jeff Burton to slow down, at which point Burton was pushed into the SAFER barrier in the tri-oval by Kasey Kahne, taking Gordon and Scott Speed with him as his car came back across the track.

On the green–white–checkered restart, on lap 189, McMurray led the cars to the green flag. One lap later, the seventh caution and second attempt at a green–white–checkered finish began when a large crash happened in turn 3. It started when Joey Logano turned Ryan Newman loose, which spun him out and collected a group of cars including Bobby Labonte, Elliott Sadler, Brian Vickers, Kasey Kahne, Marcos Ambrose, Sam Hornish Jr., and Brad Keselowski.

The accident caused a second green-white-checker which began with McMurray still leading. On lap 196, an eighth caution flag and third attempt was carried out, as Jimmie Johnson moved up, was clipped by Greg Biffle, and then smashed into the inside wall on the back straightaway. The race was then set up for the third green–white–checkered with McMurray still the leader on lap 198. At the white flag Harvick was pushing McMurray to the tri-oval. Once they were in the middle of the tri-oval on the last lap, Harvick got McMurray just loose enough to turn left to get below under his car, but unlike the previous year, McMurray gave Harvick adequate room. Harvick pulled ahead and beat McMurray to the line by 11 one-thousandths (0.011) of a second over McMurray, snapping Harvick's 115 race winless streak.

== Post-race ==
After the race, Jimmie Johnson remained the point leader; Matt Kenseth, who was in second place before, dropped to fourth while Kevin Harvick moved up to 26 points back in the second position. Greg Biffle maintained third in the point standings after finishing seventeenth in the race. Kyle Busch moved up from sixth to fifth while Mark Martin moved four positions from tenth to sixth.

== Race results ==
Pos	Grid	Car	Driver	Team	Make
1	4	29	Kevin Harvick	Richard Childress Racing	Chevrolet
2	21	1	Jamie McMurray	Earnhardt Ganassi Racing	Chevrolet
3	24	42	Juan Pablo Montoya	Earnhardt Ganassi Racing	Chevrolet
4	11	11	Denny Hamlin	Joe Gibbs Racing	Toyota
5	10	5	Mark Martin	Hendrick Motorsports	Chevrolet
6	26	6	David Ragan	Roush Fenway Racing	Ford
7	14	33	Clint Bowyer	Richard Childress Racing	Chevrolet
8	9	2	Kurt Busch	Penske Racing	Dodge
9	6	18	Kyle Busch	Joe Gibbs Racing	Toyota
10	37	09	Mike Bliss	Phoenix Racing	Chevrolet
11	15	99	Carl Edwards	Roush Fenway Racing	Ford
12	17	56	Martin Truex Jr.	Michael Waltrip Racing	Toyota
13	7	88	Dale Earnhardt Jr.	Hendrick Motorsports	Chevrolet
14	30	00	David Reutimann	Michael Waltrip Racing	Toyota
15	20	82	Scott Speed	Red Bull Racing Team	Toyota
16	13	14	Tony Stewart	Stewart–Haas Racing	Chevrolet
17	3	16	Greg Biffle	Roush Fenway Racing	Ford
18	34	34	Travis Kvapil	Front Row Motorsports	Ford
19	23	43	A. J. Allmendinger	Richard Petty Motorsports	Ford
20	38	7	Robby Gordon	Robby Gordon Motorsports	Toyota
21	22	9	Kasey Kahne	Richard Petty Motorsports	Ford
22	5	24	Jeff Gordon	Hendrick Motorsports	Chevrolet
23	32	71	Bobby Labonte	The Racer's Group	Chevrolet
24	29	77	Sam Hornish Jr.	Penske Racing	Dodge
25	18	98	Paul Menard	Richard Petty Motorsports	Ford
26	35	37	Robert Richardson Jr.	Front Row Motorsports	Ford
27	36	26	David Stremme	Latitude 43 Motorsports	Ford
28	2	17	Matt Kenseth	Roush Fenway Racing	Ford
29	19	83	Brian Vickers	Red Bull Racing Team	Toyota
30	33	38	Kevin Conway	Front Row Motorsports	Ford
31	1	48	Jimmie Johnson	Hendrick Motorsports	Chevrolet
32	8	31	Jeff Burton	Richard Childress Racing	Chevrolet
33	27	19	Elliott Sadler	Richard Petty Motorsports	Ford
34	25	12	Brad Keselowski	Penske Racing	Dodge
35	16	39	Ryan Newman	Stewart–Haas Racing	Chevrolet
36	12	20	Joey Logano	Joe Gibbs Racing	Toyota
37	28	47	Marcos Ambrose	JTG Daugherty Racing	Toyota
38	31	78	Regan Smith	Furniture Row Racing	Chevrolet
39	43	55	Michael Waltrip	Prism Motorsports	Toyota
40	40	13	Max Papis	Germain Racing	Toyota
41	39	36	Johnny Sauter	Tommy Baldwin Racing	Toyota
42	41	87	Joe Nemechek	NEMCO Motorsports	Toyota
43	42	66	Dave Blaney	Prism Motorsports	Toyota

Previous race: 2010 Samsung Mobile 500	'Sprint Cup Series '	Next race: 2010 Heath Calhoun 400
