= 2010 Crown Royal Presents the Heath Calhoun 400 =

Race details
- Race 10 of 36 in the 2010 NASCAR Sprint Cup Series
- Date: May 1, 2010
- Official name: Crown Royal 400
- Location: Richmond International Raceway Richmond, Virginia
- Course: Permanent racing facility
- Course length: 0.75 miles (1.20 km)
- Distance: 400 laps, 300 mi (483 km)
- Weather: Partly cloudy and mild
- Average speed: 111 miles per hour (179 km/h)

Pole position
Driver	Kyle Busch	Joe Gibbs Racing
- Time: 21.247

Most laps led
Driver	Kyle Busch	Joe Gibbs Racing
- Laps: 226

Winner
No. 18	Kyle Busch	Joe Gibbs Racing

Television in the United States
- Network: Fox Broadcasting Company
- Announcers: Mike Joy, Darrell Waltrip and Larry McReynolds

The 2010 Crown Royal Presents the Heath Calhoun 400 was a NASCAR Sprint Cup Series race held on May 1, 2010, at Richmond International Raceway in Richmond, Virginia. Contested over 400 laps, it was the tenth race of the 2010 NASCAR Sprint Cup Series season. The race was won by Kyle Busch for the Joe Gibbs Racing team. Jeff Gordon finished second, and Kevin Harvick, who started seventh, clinched third.

Pole position driver Kyle Busch maintained the lead after the start of the race. Kyle Busch would eventually lead to the race high of 226 laps. Afterward, Gordon became the leader during the final laps. He remained the leader until Kyle Busch passed him with four laps remaining. Kyle Busch crossed the finish line first to clinch his first win of the season, and his third at Richmond International Raceway.

There were six caution flags and twelve lead changes among eight different drivers throughout the course of the race. The result moved Kyle Busch up two spots to third in the Drivers' Championship, 109 points behind of leader Kevin Harvick and ten ahead of Matt Kenseth. Chevrolet maintained its lead in the Manufacturers' Championship, eighteen points ahead of Toyota and thirty ahead of Ford, with twenty-six races remaining in the season.

== Race report ==
=== Background ===
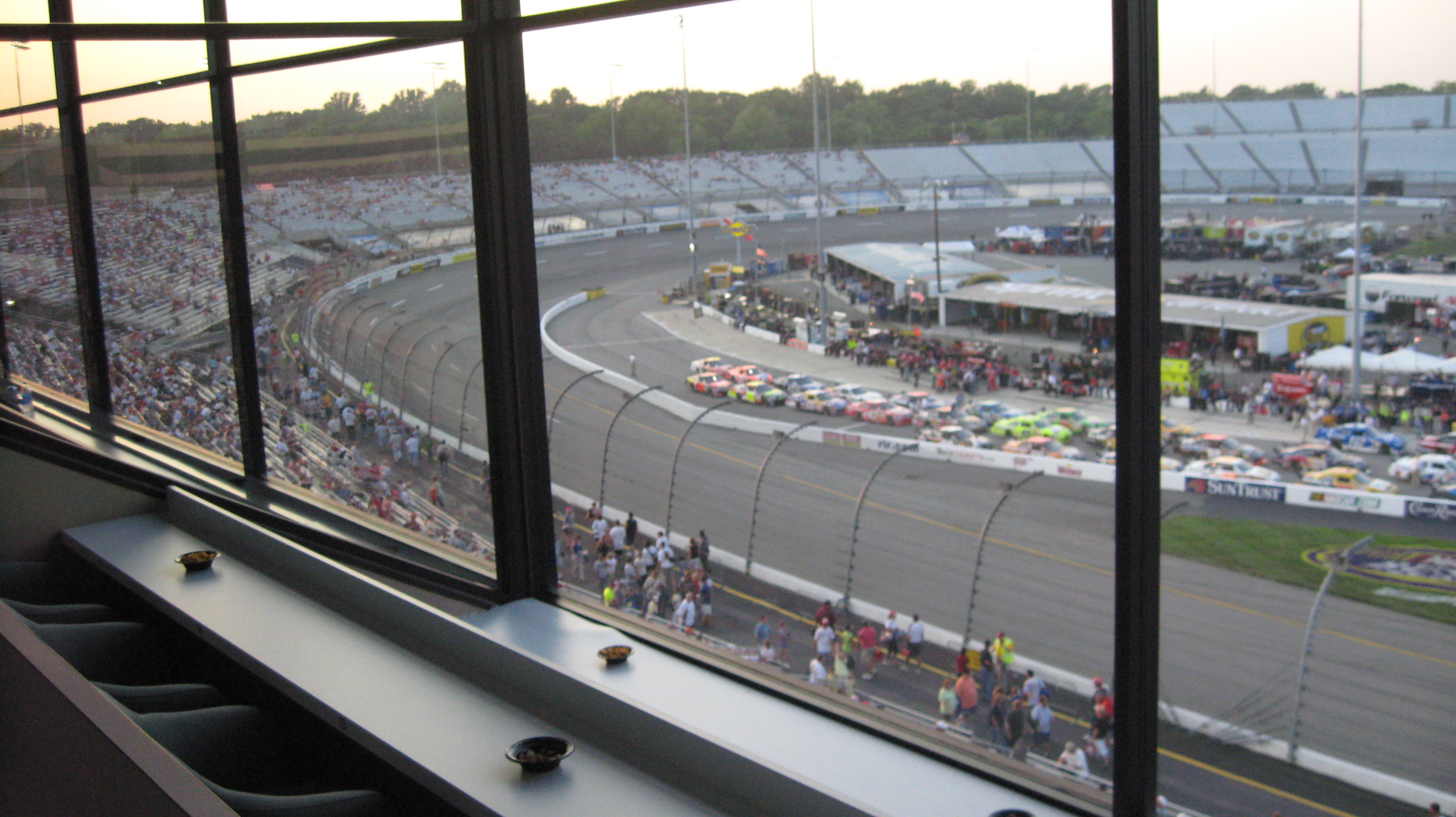
Richmond International Raceway, the race track where the race was held.

Richmond International Raceway is one of five short tracks to hold NASCAR races. The NASCAR race makes use of the track's standard configuration, a four-turn short track oval that is 0.75 miles (1.21 km) long. The track's turns are banked at fourteen degrees. The front stretch, the location of the finish line, is banked at eight degrees while the back stretch has two degrees of banking. The racetrack has seats for 97,912 spectators.

Before the race, Jimmie Johnson led the Drivers' Championship with 1,323 points, while Kevin Harvick stood in second with 1,297 points. Greg Biffle was third in the Drivers' Championship with 1,237 points, Matt Kenseth was fourth with 1,224 points, and Kyle Busch was in fifth with 1,163 points. In the Manufacturers' Championship, Chevrolet was leading with seventy points, twenty-one points ahead of their rival Toyota. Ford, with forty-two points, was four points ahead of Dodge in the battle for third.

=== Practices and qualifying ===
Two practice sessions were held on Friday before the Saturday race. In the first session, the fastest drivers were Jamie McMurray, Clint Bowyer, Joey Logano, Dale Earnhardt Jr., and Kyle Busch. During the second practice session, Kyle Busch, David Reutimann, Logano, Juan Pablo Montoya, and Jeff Gordon had the quickest times.

During qualifying, forty-six cars were entered, but Michael McDowell, Max Papis, and Dave Blaney did not qualify; NASCAR's qualifying procedure only allow forty-three cars to make the race. Kyle Busch clinched the pole position with a fastest lap time of 21.247 seconds. He was joined on the front row of the grid by Reutimann. Johnson qualified third, Gordon took fourth, and Newman started fifth.

=== Race summary ===
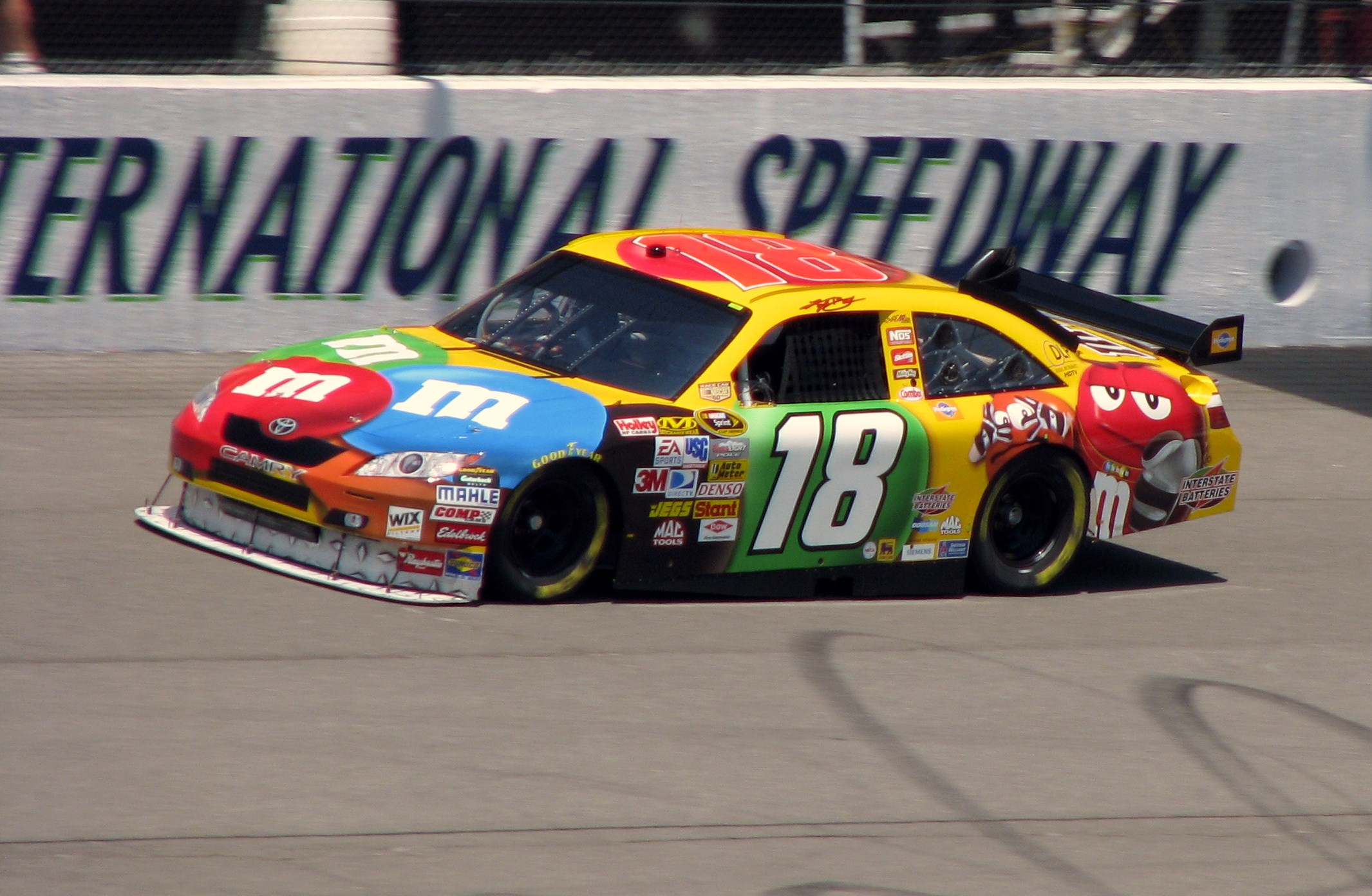
Polesitter and race winner Kyle Busch in 2008

The race, the tenth out of a total of thirty-six in the season, began at 7:30 p.m. EDT and was televised live in the United States on Fox. Conditions were clear with a high of 88 °F (31 °C). Joe Ellison, from Essex Village Community Church, began pre-race ceremonies, by giving the invocation. Next, the Commandants own United States Marine Drum and Bugle performed the national anthem, and Heath Calhoun gave the command for drivers to start their engines.

Kyle Busch held the lead going through the first corner with David Reutimann behind him. One lap later, Jeff Gordon moved into the third position. On lap 6, Gordon emerged in second, after passing Reutimann. Jimmie Johnson, who had started third, fell to fourth by lap 7. By lap 8, Kyle Busch had a lead of 1.5 seconds. One lap later, Kevin Harvick moved into fourth, after passing Johnson. On lap 18, Harvick moved into third, as Jamie McMurray moved to the sixth position. Six laps later, Reutimann had fallen to the fourth position, after starting second. By lap 35, Gordon had caught Kyle Busch for the first position, but after six laps he was two seconds behind Kyle Busch. On lap 42, the first caution came out because Joe Nemechek collided with the wall after suffering a blown tire. During this caution, drivers made there pit stops. On lap 49, Kyle Busch led on the restart.

Afterward, Gordon moved into the third position, after passing Jamie McMurray. By lap 55, Juan Pablo Montoya had moved from nineteenth to eighth. On lap 59, Harvick moved into second, but four laps later, Gordon passed him for the second position. By lap 66, Kyle Busch had a 2.3 second lead over Gordon. After starting tenth, Clint Bowyer had moved to the fifth position by lap 68. Kyle Busch remained the leader until green flag pit stops began. On lap 143, Jeff Gordon received the lead, as Kyle Busch made a pit stop. Two laps later, Kyle Busch reclaimed the lead. On lap 153, the second caution came out because of debris. Kyle Busch, again, led the field to the restart. Ten laps later, on lap 170, the third caution came out because of debris. Ryan Newman, because of a two tire change, was in the lead on the restart. On lap 177, one lap after the restart, Kyle Busch took the lead away from Newman.

Kyle Busch kept the lead until Jeff Burton passed him on lap 230. Burton led only twenty laps before Jeff Gordon claimed the lead. Jeff Gordon made a pit stop on lap 266, allowing Kevin Harvick to pass him. Green flag pit stops continued, as Carl Edwards received the lead on lap 268. Three laps later Tony Stewart passed Edwards for the lead. On lap 272, Jeff Gordon reclaimed the lead. By this time, the race was under green flag conditions for 102 laps, but the green flag run only continued until lap 367, 265 laps after the last restart, when the fourth caution came out. The cause for the caution was that Elliott Sadler had a tire that blew. On lap 377, Jeff Gordon led the field toward the green flag. Two laps later, though, the fifth caution, caused by a spin from Sam Hornish Jr., came out.

On lap 385, Jeff Gordon led the field to the green flag. Four laps later Hornish Jr. spun and collided with the inside wall, to bring out the sixth caution. Jeff Gordon, on lap 395, led toward the restart. With four laps remaining, Kyle Busch passed Gordon for the lead. Busch kept the lead to win his first race in 2010.

=== Post-race ===
"It stinks to not win every single weekend or not every 21 weekends or 21 races. But it certainly feels nice to come out here with another good win and get another good finish."

— Kyle Busch, speaking after the race.

Kyle Busch appeared in victory lane after his victory lap to start celebrating his first win of the season, and his third at Richmond International Raceway. Following his win, he added, "I don’t even remember what just happened. I drove it down into Turn 1 and hoped it stuck. I knew I had to baby it into Turn 3 and finally got to clear Jeff. We set sail there from there."

After finishing second, Jeff Gordon stated, "A little disappointed again that we are coming up short, but we are getting plenty of practice. It’s a little disappointing we haven’t won some races yet. If we keep doing this, those will come. We’ve got to keep putting ourselves in position." Gordon followed the race by saying, "I’ve been doing this long enough to know that they don’t give out trophies for leading any lap other than the last one." In the subsequent press conference, Kyle Busch said, "I can’t thank Dave enough, it’s unbelievable to be back in victory lane. A lot of people doubted what we were doing, but I never did." Gordon stated:

"I figured I was going to get the outside [for the last restart]. All I wanted to do was just get into Turn 1 smooth and get a good launch up off Turn 2 down the backstretch—and then make sure I got into [Turn] 3 without over-driving it. ...I knew if I could just get through Turn 3 OK and hammer down off Turn 4 and get him cleared that it would be pretty good—and it worked. That’s what I did. Did I have a plan? Was that exactly my plan? No. I was just going to drive it as hard as I could, and make whatever happened happen. It worked, just off the cuff."

Dave Rogers, Kyle Busch's crew chief, stated, "It would have been great to keep that many cars a lap down, but it would have been selfish. Everybody behind us was going to pit. If we stay out, we keep all those guys down. Then the seven guys behind us are going to drive by us, we’re going to lose our track position just to keep cars a lap down. It’s not worth it." The race result moved Kevin Harvick in the lead for the Driver's Championship with 1,467 points. Jimmie Johnson, who finished tenth, was second on 1,457, ninety-nine points ahead of Kyle Busch and 149 ahead of Matt Kenseth. Greg Biffle was fifth with 1,334 points. In the Manufacturers' Championship, Chevrolet maintained their lead with 76 points. Toyota maintained second with 58 points. Ford followed with 46 points, six points ahead of Dodge in fourth.

== Results ==
=== Qualifying ===
Grid	No	Driver	Team	Manufacturer	Time
1	18	Kyle Busch	Joe Gibbs Racing	Toyota	21.247
2	00	David Reutimann	Michael Waltrip Racing	Toyota	21.324
3	48	Jimmie Johnson	Hendrick Motorsports	Chevrolet	21.350
4	24	Jeff Gordon	Hendrick Motorsports	Chevrolet	21.365
5	39	Ryan Newman	Stewart Haas Racing	Chevrolet	21.387
6	12	Brad Keselowski	Penske Racing	Dodge	21.388
7	29	Kevin Harvick	Richard Childress Racing	Chevrolet	21.406
8	1	Jamie McMurray	Earnhardt Ganassi Racing	Chevrolet	21.408
9	83	Brian Vickers	Red Bull Racing Team	Toyota	21.410
10	33	Clint Bowyer	Richard Childress Racing	Chevrolet	21.426
11	87	Joe Nemechek	NEMCO Motorsports	Toyota	21.450
12	82	Scott Speed	Red Bull Racing Team	Toyota	21.451
13	36	Casey Mears	Tommy Baldwin Racing	Chevrolet	21.451
14	5	Mark Martin	Hendrick Motorsports	Chevrolet	21.456
15	43	A. J. Allmendinger	Richard Petty Motorsports	Ford	21.464
16	2	Kurt Busch	Penske Racing	Dodge	21.468
17	31	Jeff Burton	Richard Childress Racing	Chevrolet	21.475
18	14	Tony Stewart	Stewart Haas Racing	Chevrolet	21.480
19	42	Juan Pablo Montoya	Earnhardt Ganassi Racing	Chevrolet	21.487
20	47	Marcos Ambrose	JTG Daugherty Racing	Toyota	21.490
21	17	Matt Kenseth	Roush Fenway Racing	Ford	21.504
22	9	Kasey Kahne	Richard Petty Motorsports	Ford	21.523
23	20	Joey Logano	Joe Gibbs Racing	Toyota	21.533
24	19	Elliott Sadler	Richard Petty Motorsports	Ford	21.539
25	88	Dale Earnhardt Jr.	Hendrick Motorsports	Chevrolet	21.542
26	56	Martin Truex Jr.	Michael Waltrip Racing	Toyota	21.548
27	77	Sam Hornish Jr.	Penske Racing	Dodge	21.552
28	99	Carl Edwards	Roush Fenway Racing	Ford	21.559
29	78	Regan Smith	Furniture Row Racing	Chevrolet	21.565
30	11	Denny Hamlin	Joe Gibbs Racing	Toyota	21.580
31	71	Bobby Labonte	TRG Motorsports	Chevrolet	21.584
32	98	Paul Menard	Richard Petty Motorsports	Ford	21.591
33	16	Greg Biffle	Roush Fenway Racing	Ford	21.607
34	32	Reed Sorenson	Braun Racing	Toyota	21.635
35	6	David Ragan	Roush Fenway Racing	Ford	21.655
36	09	Mike Bliss	Phoenix Racing	Chevrolet	21.663
37	7	Robby Gordon	Robby Gordon Motorsports	Toyota	21.669
38	34	Travis Kvapil	Front Row Motorsports	Ford	21.734
39	26	David Stremme	Latitude 43 Motorsports	Ford	21.735
40	37	David Gilliland	Front Row Motorsports	Ford	21.748
41	46	Terry Cook	Whitney Motorsports	Dodge	21.757
42	38	Kevin Conway	Front Row Motorsports	Ford	22.221
43	64	Tony Raines	Gunselman Motorsports	Toyota	21.787
	55	Michael McDowell	Prism Motorsports	Toyota	21.803
	13	Max Papis	Germain Racing	Toyota	21.830
	66	Dave Blaney	Prism Motorsports	Toyota	21.847

=== Race results ===
Pos	Grid	Car	Driver	Team	Manufacturer	Laps	Points
1	1	18	Kyle Busch	Joe Gibbs Racing	Toyota	400	195^{2}
2	4	24	Jeff Gordon	Hendrick Motorsports	Chevrolet	400	175^{1}
3	7	29	Kevin Harvick	Richard Childress Racing	Chevrolet	400	170^{1}
4	17	31	Jeff Burton	Richard Childress Racing	Chevrolet	400	165^{1}
5	28	99	Carl Edwards	Roush Fenway Racing	Ford	400	160^{1}
6	19	42	Juan Pablo Montoya	Earnhardt Ganassi Racing	Chevrolet	400	155
7	26	56	Martin Truex Jr.	Michael Waltrip Racing	Toyota	400	151^{1}
8	5	39	Ryan Newman	Stewart Haas Racing	Chevrolet	400	147^{1}
9	20	47	Marcos Ambrose	JTG Daugherty Racing	Toyota	400	138
10	3	48	Jimmie Johnson	Hendrick Motorsports	Chevrolet	400	134
11	30	11	Denny Hamlin	Joe Gibbs Racing	Toyota	400	130
12	10	33	Clint Bowyer	Richard Childress Racing	Chevrolet	400	127
13	21	17	Matt Kenseth	Roush Fenway Racing	Ford	400	124
14	6	12	Brad Keselowski	Penske Racing	Dodge	400	121
15	2	00	David Reutimann	Michael Waltrip Racing	Toyota	400	118
16	23	20	Joey Logano	Joe Gibbs Racing	Toyota	400	115
17	15	43	A. J. Allmendinger	Richard Petty Motorsports	Ford	400	112
18	16	2	Kurt Busch	Penske Racing	Dodge	400	109
19	8	1	Jamie McMurray	Earnhardt Ganassi Racing	Chevrolet	399	106
20	9	83	Brian Vickers	Red Bull Racing Team	Toyota	399	103
21	22	9	Kasey Kahne	Richard Petty Motorsports	Ford	399	100
22	33	16	Greg Biffle	Roush Fenway Racing	Ford	399	97
23	18	14	Tony Stewart	Stewart Haas Racing	Chevrolet	399	99^{1}
24	35	6	David Ragan	Roush Fenway Racing	Ford	399	91
25	14	5	Mark Martin	Hendrick Motorsports	Chevrolet	399	88
26	13	36	Casey Mears	Tommy Baldwin Racing	Chevrolet	399	85
27	32	98	Paul Menard	Richard Petty Motorsports	Ford	398	82
28	37	7	Robby Gordon	Robby Gordon Motorsports	Toyota	398	79
29	39	26	David Stremme	Latitude 43 Motorsports	Ford	398	76
30	29	78	Regan Smith	Furniture Row Racing	Chevrolet	398	73
31	40	37	David Gilliland	Front Row Motorsports	Ford	398	70
32	25	88	Dale Earnhardt Jr.	Hendrick Motorsports	Chevrolet	397	67
33	31	71	Bobby Labonte	TRG Motorsports	Chevrolet	397	64
34	38	34	Travis Kvapil	Front Row Motorsports	Ford	396	61
35	12	82	Scott Speed	Red Bull Racing Team	Toyota	393	58
36	27	77	Sam Hornish Jr.	Penske Racing	Dodge	387	55
37	42	38	Kevin Conway	Front Row Motorsports	Ford	387	52
38	24	19	Elliott Sadler	Richard Petty Motorsports	Ford	385	49
39	41	46	Terry Cook	Whitney Motorsports	Dodge	92	46
40	36	09	Mike Bliss	Phoenix Racing	Chevrolet	86	43
41	34	32	Reed Sorenson	Braun Racing	Toyota	80	40
42	43	64	Tony Raines	Gunselman Motorsports	Toyota	69	37
43	11	87	Joe Nemechek	NEMCO Motorsports	Toyota	42	34
^{1} Includes five bonus points for leading a lap
^{2} Includes ten bonus points for leading the most laps

== Standings after the race ==
Drivers' Championship standings

Pos	Driver	Points
1	Kevin Harvick	1,467
2	Jimmie Johnson	1,457
3	Kyle Busch	1,358
4	Matt Kenseth	1,348
5	Greg Biffle	1,334

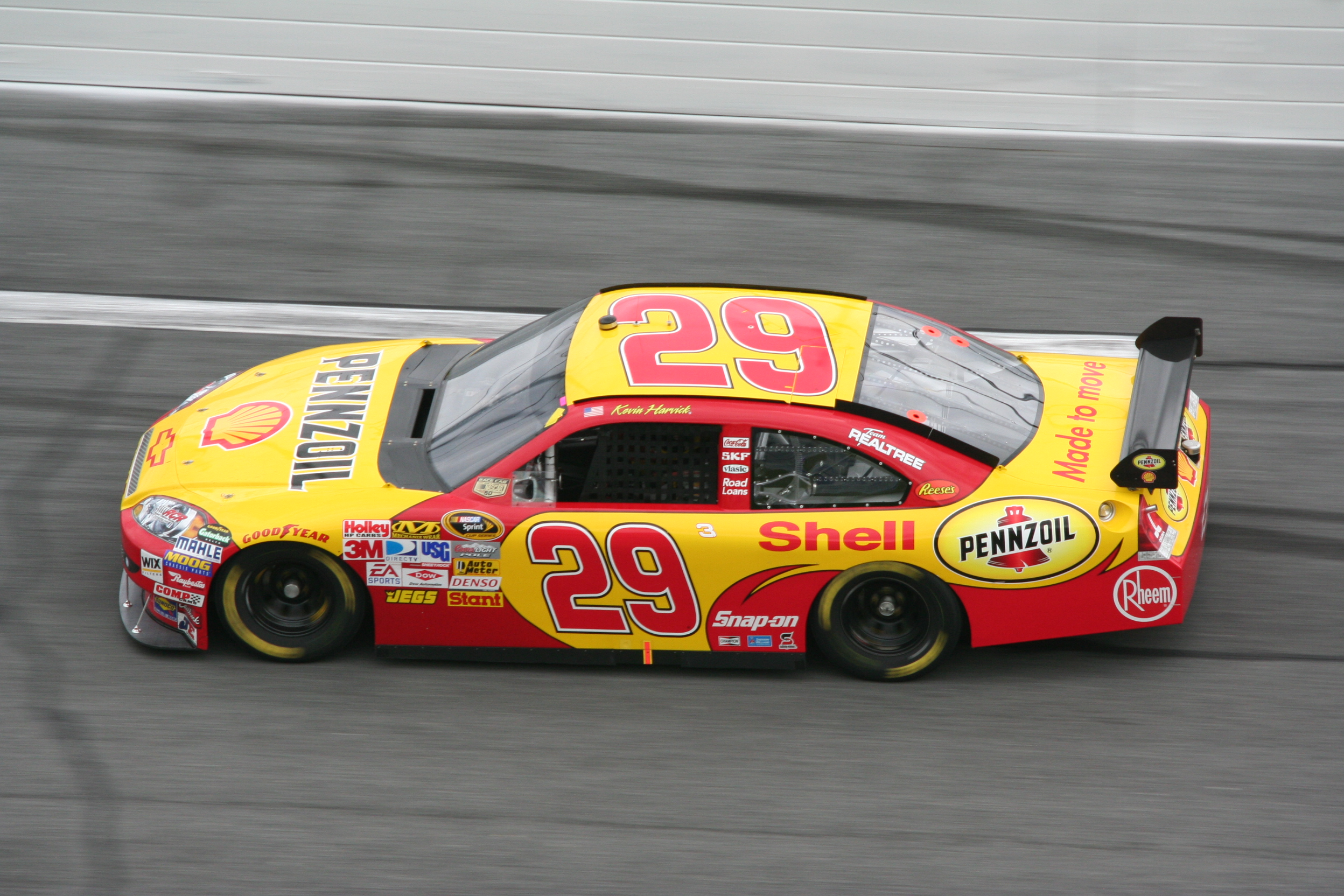
Kevin Harvick became the Drivers' Championship leader after finishing third in the race.

Manufacturers' Championship standings

Pos	Manufacturer	Points
1	Chevrolet	76
2	Toyota	58
3	Ford	46
4	Dodge	42

- Note: Only the top five positions are included for both sets of standings.

Previous race: 2010 Aaron's 499	Sprint Cup Series; 2010 season	Next race: 2010 Showtime Southern 500
