= Road course ringer =

NASCAR term describing drivers who mostly drive on road courses

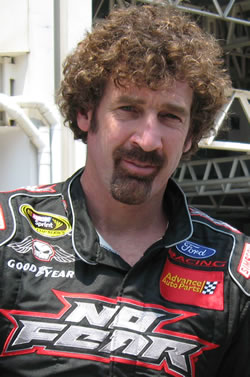
Boris Said is a road course ringer in NASCAR.

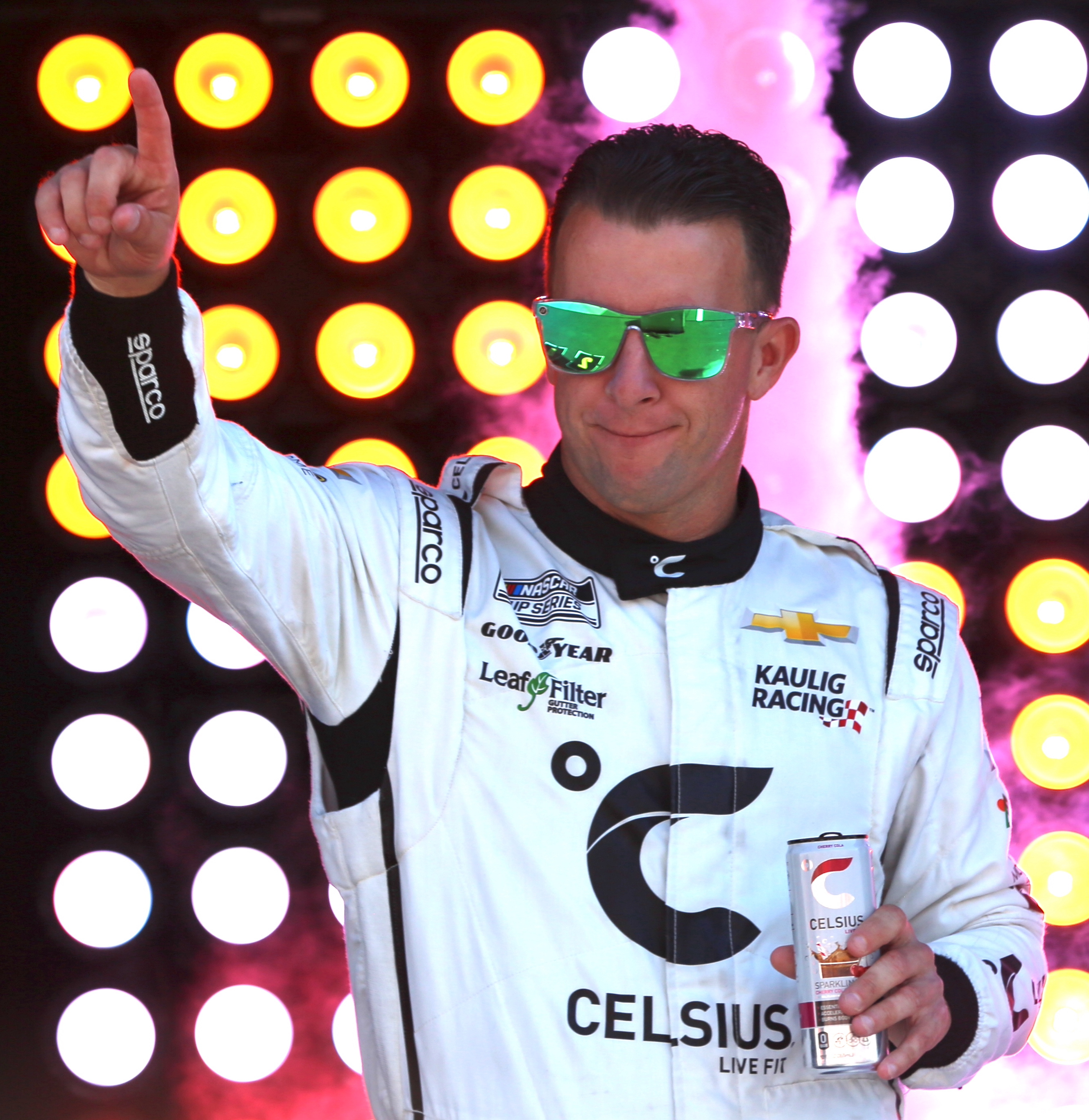
A. J. Allmendinger was historically a road course ringer, but is now full time in the NASCAR Cup Series.

In NASCAR, a road course ringer, also known as road course specialist, road course expert, or a road runner, is a non-NASCAR driver who is hired by a NASCAR Cup Series or NASCAR Xfinity Series team to race specifically on road courses.

As of December 2025, current NASCAR national-level road courses include Circuit of the Americas, Sonoma, Watkins Glen, San Diego, the Charlotte Roval, and Lime Rock Park, and St. Petersburg. Former road courses include Mosport, Riverside, Road America, Topeka, Indianapolis Motor Speedway, Montreal, Portland International Raceway, and Mid-Ohio. Road courses on hiatus but slated to make a return include Chicago Street Course and Mexico City. For many years, NASCAR only hosted two or three races on road courses in any of the top three divisions, providing limited opportunities for ringers. However, in some cases, the ringers have been able to pull off victories.

NASCAR describes road course ringers as "drivers who specialize in turning both left and right," and says that "perhaps the greatest road-course ringer in NASCAR history might be Dan Gurney" after he won four straight NASCAR races at Riverside. He lapped the field at the 1964 event.

== Term origin ==
"Ringer" is a slang term commonly used in sports to describe a particularly good competitor who is brought in to win in a specific match as opposed to competing in the entire schedule. It can also be used to describe an athlete who plays in a higher level playing in a lower level tournament; a softball team in a Class C/D tournament (as governed by USA Softball) hires one or two players who fit in Class A or B, or a tennis player who plays in Class I tournaments as a "ringer" in a Class II tournament. For example, in association football, at the FIFA Under-23 Championships that is typically held at the Olympic Games, teams are allowed a selected number of players just over the age of 23. The term does not relate directly to racing and does not refer to the shape of the race course, but instead the term in NASCAR refers to the driver being typically driver who races in other circuits.

== Drivers ==
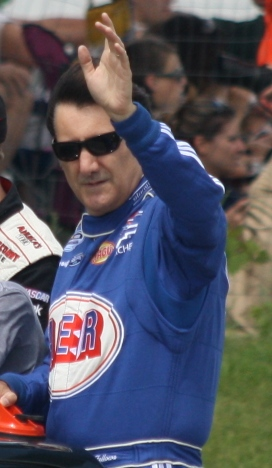
Ron Fellows is one of the few ringers to win races in two of NASCAR's top three divisions.

A road course ringer is often brought in if the usual driver either is inexperienced at road courses, or is having a poor season and the team needs an excellent qualifying run to qualify for the race. Cup Series teams who are near the bottom of the top 35 in owner points hire a ringer or adept former competitor like Terry Labonte to ensure that they remain in top 35 to keep a guaranteed starting spot in future races. It is not unusual that a lower level team's best finish would be at a road course because of the use of a road course expert. Some full-time drivers are adept at racing on road courses, but they are not considered road course ringers. Road course ringers have competed in championships which race primarily road courses, frequently in IndyCar or sports car racing series such as ALMS or Grand Am.

I think a handful of guys, or 10 guys, 12 guys that really like going to the Glen and like going to Sonoma and look forward to those races. Then there's probably half the field that can take it or leave it. Then there's a quarter of the field that would be fine if we didn't go.

— Tony Stewart

== Notable road course ringers ==
- A. J. Allmendinger (2006–present), Previously served as ringer in NXS and for Kaulig Racing at the Cup level before becoming full time.
- Mark Donohue (1972–1973), Won 1973 Winston Western 500
- Ron Fellows (1995–2013), Five NXS road course wins, 24 of 25 Cup starts were road courses
- Robby Gordon (1991–2012), 2003 Road Course Champion
- Dan Gurney (1962–1970, 1980), Five NXS road course wins, 9 of 16 NASCAR starts on road courses
- Kenny Habul (2012–2016), 15 NXS starts, all road courses
- Tommy Kendall
- Andy Lally (2007–2021), Primarily road courses in NXS. Nine top tens at road courses
- Justin Marks (2007–2018), Primarily road courses in Cup and NXS. Won 2016 Mid-Ohio Challenge. Current co-owner of Trackhouse Racing Team
- Max Papis (2006–2013), 12 of 14 NXS races were road courses. Currently a driving coach for Richard Childress Racing
- Nelson Piquet Jr. (2010–2016), NXS 2012 Sargento 200 winner
- Scott Pruett (2000–2008), Following 2000 season ran only road races
- Kimi Räikkönen (2022–present), inaugural driver for Trackhouse Racing Team’s Project 91.
- Boris Said (1999–2022), Only road course starts since 2010. Running road course currently for MBM Motorsports
- Dorsey Schroeder
- Brian Simo (1997–2012), all road courses attempts and starts except at Loudon in 1998 Busch Series.
- Alex Tagliani (2009–2020), 13 starts, all road courses in NXS and Truck Series
- Shane van Gisbergen (2023-Present), won his debut race, the 2023 Grant Park 220 street course race, driving the "Project91" Trackhouse Racing car
- Jacques Villeneuve (2007–2022), Ten road course starts, running road course currently for Team Hezeberg
- Will Brown (2024-Present), currently running road course races for Kaulig Racing

== Wins ==
Dan Gurney won five NASCAR races as a ringer, while also succeeding in Formula One. Mark Donohue won the 1973 Motor Trend 500 at Riverside in a Penske Racing AMC Matador.

Ringers Fellows, Said, and Pruett had combined for 13 Top 10 finishes in their 35 career road course starts (as of 2007). Said has the only two poles by a road course ringer, but only one was in a road course race. Said qualified on the pole for the 2003 Dodge/Save Mart 350 at Sears Point Raceway and almost won the pole for the 2007 Pepsi 400 at Daytona International Speedway, when rain cancelled the conclusion of the trials while Said was on the pole. Due to Said not being in the top 43 in points, which is how NASCAR determines the starting lineup in the event rain washes out qualifying, he wound up not making the field and missed the race. Boris Said later won a Nationwide Series race in Circuit Gilles Villeneuve in Montreal, Quebec in August 2010.

Ron Fellows has won the most races by road ringers, winning in the NASCAR Camping World Truck Series and the NASCAR Xfinity Series mostly at Watkins Glen and once in Montreal. He almost won four Cup series races, finishing second at the Glen in 1999 and 2004, and dominating at Sonoma in 2001 with NEMCO and 2003 with DEI.

A. J. Allmendinger won as a ringer in the Cup Series for Kaulig Racing in the inaugural 2021 Verizon 200 at the Brickyard.

Most recently, 3 time Supercars champion Shane van Gisbergen, won as a ringer in his NASCAR Cup debut. He won the inaugural 2023 Grant Park 220 street course race at the Chicago Street Course, driving the "Project91" car for Trackhouse Racing. Trackhouse's Project91 program was designed to invite international road course ringers to the Cup Series, taking advantage of the Next Gen car's improvement for road course racing.

== Decline in the Cup Series ==
Since the late 2000s, the "ringer" has steadily disappeared from the Cup Series. Factors contributing to this trend are:

- The Chase/NASCAR playoffs has made it counterproductive for teams to sacrifice the driver points of their full-time drivers in exchange for a possible win by a road course specialist.
- Because of this, full-time drivers have been forced to become more proficient on road courses, which in turn means that the average NASCAR driver today is a much better road course driver than in the recent past.

The decline of "ringers" was dramatically illustrated at the 2009 Watkins Glen race. Only one road course specialist was substituting for a driver in a fully sponsored, full-season NASCAR team—Patrick Carpentier for Michael Waltrip Racing. He did not compete for Michael Waltrip Racing the following season, though he did run for Latitude 43 Motorsports for eight races. Fellows drove in the race with the part-time Phoenix Racing, Said was then a part-owner of his team, and three other specialists were with lower-tier teams without full sponsorship. In the years afterwards, road course specialists drove for rides that would start-and-park. For example, road course driver Tony Ave would say, in a 2020 YouTube interview with a fan, that he stopped racing in NASCAR because he didn't want to become a start-and-park driver.

== Xfinity and Truck road course ringers in playoff era ==
- The nature of the Xfinity Series races at Mid-Ohio Sports Car Course and Road America often allows road course ringers to participate in those races, since they are not subject to NASCAR's seven-race restriction Cup Series regulars are restricted by NASCAR rule. Also, prior to 2021, both events (Mid-Ohio only in 2021) are often held on weekends where Cup Series action is at an oval (different road course in 2021) elsewhere around the country.
- Similarly, because Cup Series drivers are prohibited from participation in the Camping World Truck Series race at Canadian Tire Motorsports Park because it is in the playoff, a road course ringer is preferred as a substitute driver. Note too a road course ringer may often substitute for a team if they normally use a driver under 18 years old. NASCAR classifies road courses in the same category as tracks less than 1.25 miles, allowing drivers 16 and 17 years of age to participate in this race.

== Dirt track ringer ==
A variant of the road ringer, the dirt track ringer, has appeared in NASCAR since the Truck Series organized the Eldora Dirt Derby. Teams have often added a dirt track ace, typically a sprint car or dirt late model driver. The Dirt Derby was replaced by the Corn Belt 150 in 2021 and NASCAR added a dirt race for both the Truck and Cup Series at Bristol Motor Speedway.

Notable drivers have included Scott Bloomquist, Bobby Pierce, Logan Seavey, and Kyle Strickler.

Truck Series regulars Stewart Friesen and Sheldon Creed began their NASCAR careers as dirt track ringers before racing full schedules.
