= 2011 Kobalt Tools 400 =

Race details
- Race 3 of 36 in the 2011 NASCAR Sprint Cup Series
- Date: March 6, 2011
- Location: Las Vegas Motor Speedway, Clark County, Nevada
- Course: Permanent racing facility
- Course length: 1.5 miles (2.4 km)
- Distance: 267 laps, 400.5 mi (644.5 km)
- Weather: Sunny with a high around 71; wind out of the SW at 10 mph.
- Average speed: 135.508 miles per hour (218.079 km/h)

Pole position
Driver	Matt Kenseth	Roush Fenway Racing
- Time: 28.589

Most laps led
Driver	Tony Stewart	Stewart–Haas Racing
- Laps: 166

Winner
No. 99	Carl Edwards	Roush Fenway Racing

Television in the United States
- Network: Fox
- Announcers: Mike Joy, Darrell Waltrip and Larry McReynolds

The 2011 Kobalt Tools 400 was a NASCAR Sprint Cup Series stock car race that was held on March 6, 2011, at Las Vegas Motor Speedway in Clark County, Nevada. Contested over 267 laps, it was the third race of the 2011 season. Carl Edwards, driving for Roush Fenway Racing, won the race. Tony Stewart finished second and Juan Pablo Montoya finished third.

Polesitter Matt Kenseth maintained his lead on the first lap to begin the race, as Greg Biffle, who started in the fourth position on the grid, remained behind him. On the 8th lap, the first caution was given because Robby Gordon spun sideways. Following the second caution, Stewart became the leader, and increased his lead to 6.5 seconds by lap 95. Late in the race, Stewart was given a penalty for speeding on pit road, giving the lead to Edwards. Edwards remained the leader to win for the second time at Las Vegas Motor Speedway.

There were seven cautions and 22 lead changes among 15 different drivers throughout the course of the race. It was Edwards' first win in the 2011 season and the 20th of his career. The result moved Edwards up to the third position in the Drivers' Championship, seven points behind Stewart while being tied with Montoya. Ford maintained its lead in the Manufacturers' Championship, three points ahead of Chevrolet and five ahead of Toyota, with 33 races remaining in the season. A total of 152,000 people attended the race, while 10.1 million watched it on television.

== Report ==
=== Background ===
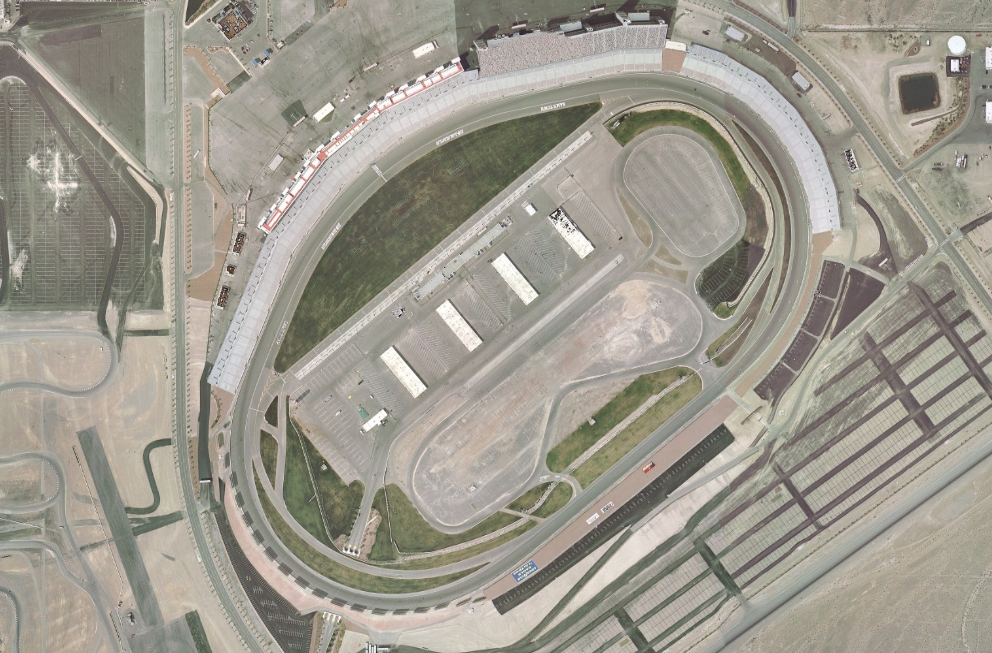
Las Vegas Motor Speedway, the race track where the race was held

Las Vegas Motor Speedway is one of ten intermediate tracks to hold NASCAR races. The race was scheduled to be held on the standard track at Las Vegas Motor Speedway; a four-turn D-shaped oval track that is 1.5 miles (2.4 km) long. The track's turns are banked at 20 degrees, while the front stretch, the location of the finish line, and the back stretch on the opposite side of the track are banked at nine degrees. The racetrack has seats for 142,000 spectators.

Before the race, Kyle Busch was leading the Drivers' Championship with 80 points, and Kurt Busch stood in second with 77 points. Tony Stewart and A. J. Allmendinger followed tied for third and fourth with 69 points, four ahead of Jeff Gordon and Mark Martin, who were tied for fifth. In the Manufacturers' Championship, Ford, Toyota and Chevrolet were leading with twelve points, four points ahead of Dodge. Jimmie Johnson was the race's defending winner from 2010.

=== Practice and qualifying ===
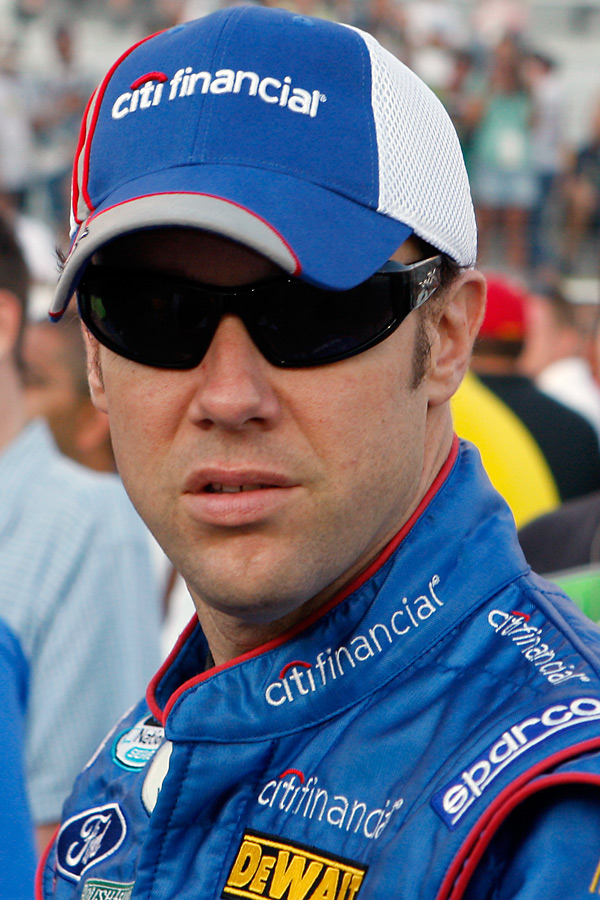
Matt Kenseth qualified on the pole position for Roush Fenway Racing

Two practice sessions were held in preparation for the race; one on Friday and the other on Saturday. The first session lasted 90 minutes long, while the second was 75 minutes long. Matt Kenseth was quickest with a time of 28.939 seconds in the first session, 0.047 seconds faster than David Ragan. Montoya was just off Ragan's pace, followed by Carl Edwards, Greg Biffle, and Marcos Ambrose. Stewart was seventh, still within a second of Kenseth's time. Also in the first practice session, Jeff Gordon spun sideways after the fourth turn.

Forty-four cars were entered for qualifying; however, only forty-three could qualify for the race because of NASCAR's qualifying procedure. Kenseth clinched the fifth pole position of his career, with a time of 28.589 seconds. He was joined on the front row of the grid by Ambrose. Edwards qualified third, Biffle took fourth, and Kyle Busch started fifth. Joey Logano, Allmendinger, Newman, Martin Truex Jr. and Martin rounded out the top ten. The only driver that failed to qualify for the race was Brian Keselowski. Once the qualifying session completed, Kenseth commented, "Qualifying is not my strong suit, but I knew we had a really fast car today when we did our last qualifying run [in practice]. Honestly, this is the most nervous I've been before qualifying in probably five years at least, because I knew we had a shot at the pole, and I knew last week we really messed up. I didn't want to mess up a fast car today, so I was really happy with that."

In the second and final practice, Kenseth remained quickest with a time of 29.330 seconds. Kyle Busch followed in second, ahead of Newman and Edwards. Biffle was fifth quickest, with a time of 29.393 seconds. David Reutimann, Truex, Stewart, Logano, and Denny Hamlin rounded out the top ten positions. Ragan, who was second in the first session, could only manage 12th.

=== Race ===
The race, the third in the season, began at 3:00 p.m. EST and was televised live in the United States on Fox. The conditions on the grid were dry before the race with the air temperature at 60 °F (16 °C). Las Vegas Motor Speedway Chaplain Joe Freiburger began pre-race ceremonies, by giving the invocation. Next, Kristen Hertzenberg, from Phantom-Las Vegas Spectacular, performed the national anthem, and Gray Abercrombie, Lowe's sports marketing manager, gave the command for drivers to start their engines. During the pace laps, Hamlin had to move to the rear of the grid because of him changing his engine.

Kenseth retained his pole position lead into the first corner, followed by Biffle, who started fourth. Over the following two laps, Edwards fell to the fourth position, while Biffle passed Kenseth for the lead. After starting 16th on the grid, Trevor Bayne moved up to 11th by the fifth lap. On the following lap, Truex fell three positions to ninth. At lap eight, the first caution was given after Robby Gordon spun sideways. Most of the front runners made pit stops during the caution, while Jeff Gordon stayed out to become the leader. During the lap 12 restart, Jeff Gordon was the leader ahead of Stewart and Montoya. However, Stewart passed Gordon to become the leader on the next lap. Also on the same lap, Kenseth drove to pit road after having a flat tire. On the 14th lap, Stewart remained the leader, while Kurt Busch moved to the second position ahead of Jeff Gordon. Afterward, Andy Lally spun sideways, prompting the second caution. Few drivers made pit stops during the caution. At the lap 18 restart, Stewart was first, followed by Busch, Gordon, and Montoya. By the 20th lap, Reutimann, who started 25th on the grid, had moved up 18 positions.

By lap 24, Stewart maintained a 1.7 second lead over Busch, as Gordon fell to sixth. Stewart continued to increase his lead over the next ten laps, while Busch remained in the second position. On the 35th lap, Reutimann moved up to the sixth position. Seven laps later, Jamie McMurray and Keselowski made contact with each other. On the following lap, Paul Menard moved up to 12th. At the 45th lap, Stewart had a 3.6 second lead over Busch, as Johnson fell to 23rd. On the next lap, Biffle claimed second away from Busch. During lap 49, green flag pit stops began with Kurt Busch and Reutimann. On lap 51, Gordon, Montoya, made pit stops, as Biffle became the leader. Once green flag pit stops concluded on lap 62, Stewart reclaimed the first position ahead of Kyle Busch. Two laps later, Biffle claimed moved up to the fourth position. On the next lap, Bill Elliott claimed the fifth position. Stewart increased his lead to 1.6 seconds by the 67th lap. At lap 74, Gordon moved up into the tenth position after passing Logano. Four laps later, Kevin Harvick moved up to the 14th position. On lap 81, Harvick claimed the 13th position.

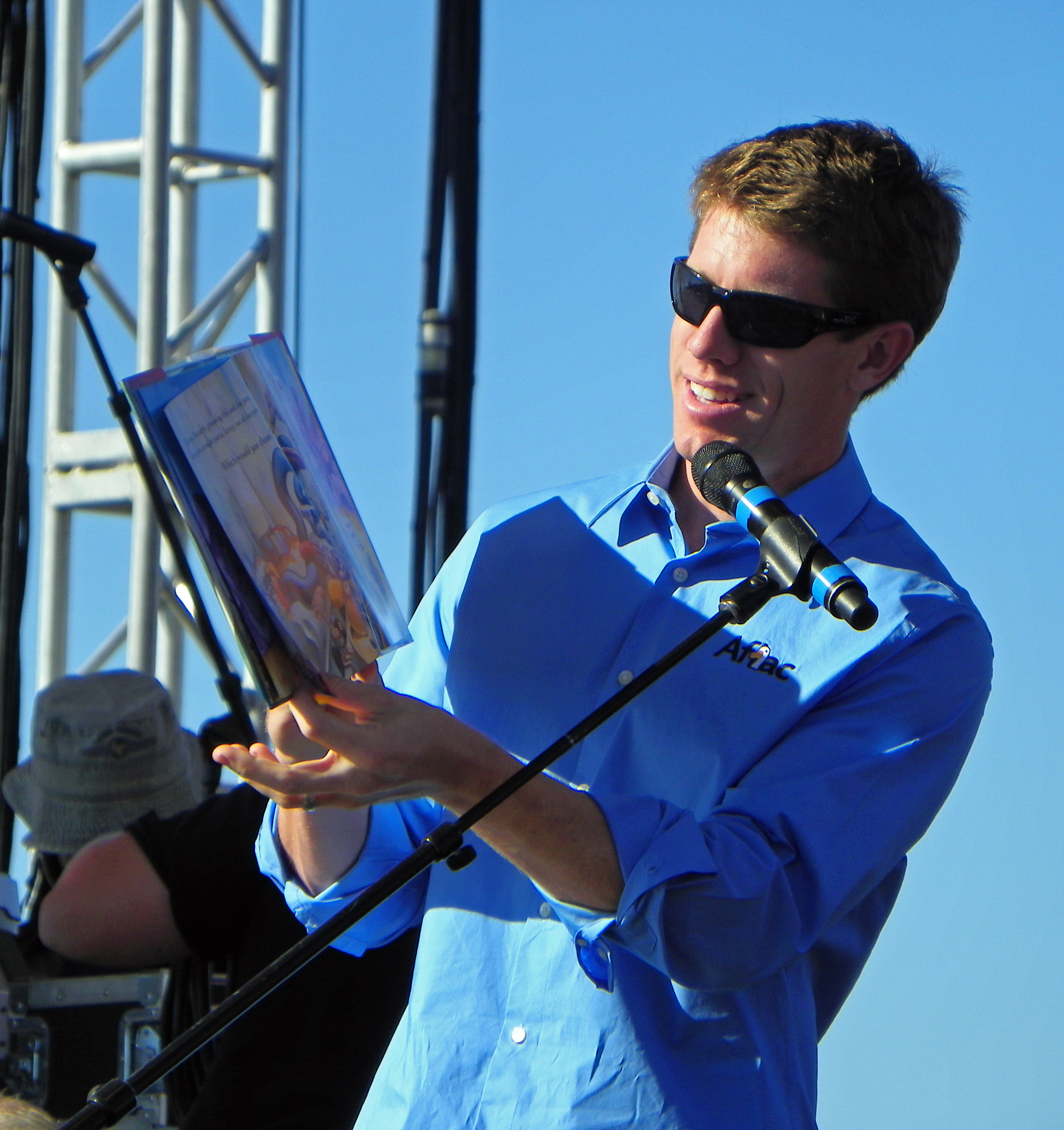
Carl Edwards won the race.

During lap 87, Gordon moved up to the tenth position. By the 95th lap, Stewart had increased his lead to 6.5 seconds over second place. On the next lap, the third caution was given after Kyle Busch collided into the wall because of a flat tire. Most of the frontrunners made pit stops during the caution. At the 101 restart, Stewart was the leader. On the following lap, Kurt Busch and Kahne spun sideways, prompting the fourth caution to be given. On the lap 106 restart, Stewart remained the leader ahead of Edwards and Biffle in second and third. On the 107th lap, Biffle passed Edwards for the second position. Afterward, Kyle Busch's engine failed, causing the fifth caution to come out. At lap 115, Stewart led Biffle on the restart. During lap 121, Edwards passed Biffle to claim second, as Stewart increased his lead. Ten laps later, Harvick moved up to the sixth position. On lap 138, Dale Earnhardt Jr. claimed the seventh position, while Truex fell to sixth. Eleven laps later, the sixth caution was given because Gilliland collided into the wall after having a flat tire. During the caution, most of the teams made pit stops. Also on the same lap, Stewart and Harvick received a penalty after having speeding on pit road.

At the lap 156 restart, Edwards became the leader ahead of Truex. Edwards maintained the lead on the next lap, as Montoya moved up into third. By lap 159, Edwards had a 1.25 second lead over Truex. Five laps later, Johnson passed Gordon for the ninth position. Edwards continued to increase his lead to 2.6 seconds by lap 171. After having a speed penalty, Stewart had moved up to 18th by the 178th lap. On lap 185, Clint Bowyer moved up to 16th, while Edwards increased his lead to 2.9 seconds. Nine laps later, the seventh caution was given after Gordon collided into the wall after having a flat tire. Most of the drivers made pit stops during the caution, as Stewart reclaimed the first position at the lap 202 restart. By the 214th lap, Stewart had a lead of 2.45 seconds. Four laps later, Menard moved up to the tenth position after passing Brian Vickers. On lap 220, Edwards passed Truex to claim third, as Stewart increased his lead to 3 seconds. Five laps later, Hamlin moved up to the seventh position. On lap 234, green flag pit stops began with Stewart and Montoya. Two laps later, Harvick and Johnson made pit stops, five laps before Edwards and Truex.

Once the green flag pit stops concluded, Edwards was the leader, 1.1 seconds ahead of Montoya. By the 250th lap, Edwards increased his lead to 1.6 seconds. On the following lap, Kurt Busch moved into the tenth position, as Newman moved up to fifth. With four laps remaining, Stewart passed Montoya for the second position. Edwards maintained the lead to win his first race of the 2011 season. Stewart finished second, ahead of Montoya in third and Ambrose in fourth. Newman clinched the fifth position, after starting eighth.

=== Post-race ===
"It kills me to throw a race away like that, especially at a place we haven't won at yet. This was a big deal [Sunday], and when you lead that many laps and have a car that's that fast and you lose it ... I'm sure [Monday] when the emotion dies down we'll look back and say it was a great weekend. But, man, it does not sit good right now."

— Tony Stewart, speaking after the race.

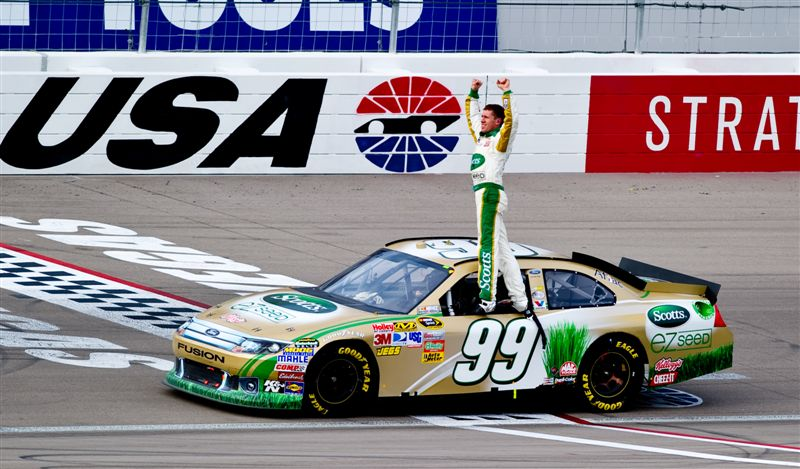
Carl Edwards celebrating his first (and only) win of the season

Edwards appeared in victory lane after his victory lap to start celebrating his first win of the season, in front of a crowd of 152,000 people. "These guys are unbelievable. It means a lot coming off Phoenix. I went home last week and didn’t know how things were going to go. You don’t get a good race car like that often. We had another one today," said Edwards of his triumph.

Although Stewart was leading the race near the end, Edwards passed him after the final pit stops. Stewart, who finished second, said, "I don't know what happened on the pit stop there, but we had a miscue and had a penalty and had to go to the back, and unfortunately it kind of dealt our cards for us. [Crew chief] Darian Grubb made a good call getting us the track position back, but it also showed everybody else that they could do it, too, and we couldn't run two-and-a-half runs on a set of left-side tires." In the subsequent press conference, Kyle Busch stated his frustration from his accident, "On the restart there [on Lap 107], I was going to bide my time and try to get back through traffic with plenty of time to go, and 'kablooey' – it just broke." Doug Yates, the engine builder for Roush Fenway Racing, expressed his enjoyment of winning the race:

"This is an exciting win for Roush Yates Engines. We ran great all week long. I think this says a lot about our program and how we plan to run at 1.5 mile tracks throughout the 2011 season. I want to thank Ford again for their support as we continue to excel with the FR9 engine."

Stewart also commented, "It kills me to throw a race away like that, especially at a place we haven't won at yet. This was a big deal [Sunday], and when you lead that many laps and have a car that's that fast and you lose it ... I'm sure [Monday] when the emotion dies down we'll look back and say it was a great weekend. But, man, it does not sit good right now." The race result moved Stewart into the first position in the Driver's Championship with 113 points, tied with Kurt Busch in second. Edwards, the winner of the race, and Montoya followed in third and fourth on 106, three points ahead of Newman in fifth. Ford maintained their lead in the Manufacturers' Championship with 21 points. Chevrolet and Toyota placed second and third with 18 and 16 points, while Dodge was fourth with 11. 10.1 million people watched the race on television. The race took two hours, fifty-seven minutes and twenty seconds to complete, and the margin of victory was 1.246 seconds.

Carl's win would be the only win of the season for him, in the same race teammate Matt Kenseth won en route to the 2003 title. Due to the Chase format introduced after Matt's title, Carl would end up losing the title via tiebreaker to Stewart, who entered the Chase winless and went on to win five of the ten Chase races, including the finale.

== Results ==
=== Qualifying ===
Grid	No.	Driver	Team	Manufacturer	Time	Speed
1	17	Matt Kenseth	Roush Fenway Racing	Ford	28.589	188.884
2	9	Marcos Ambrose	Richard Petty Motorsports	Ford	28.698	188.166
3	99	Carl Edwards	Roush Fenway Racing	Ford	28.704	188.127
4	16	Greg Biffle	Roush Fenway Racing	Ford	28.728	187.970
5	18	Kyle Busch	Joe Gibbs Racing	Toyota	28.790	187.565
6	20	Joey Logano	Joe Gibbs Racing	Toyota	28.828	187.318
7	43	A. J. Allmendinger	Richard Petty Motorsports	Ford	28.838	187.253
8	39	Ryan Newman	Stewart–Haas Racing	Chevrolet	28.843	187.221
9	56	Martin Truex Jr.	Michael Waltrip Racing	Toyota	28.846	187.201
10	5	Mark Martin	Hendrick Motorsports	Chevrolet	28.847	187.195
11	1	Jamie McMurray	Earnhardt Ganassi Racing	Chevrolet	28.864	187.084
12	78	Regan Smith	Furniture Row Racing	Chevrolet	28.864	187.084
13	24	Jeff Gordon	Hendrick Motorsports	Chevrolet	28.892	186.903
14	48	Jimmie Johnson	Hendrick Motorsports	Chevrolet	28.919	186.728
15	14	Tony Stewart	Stewart–Haas Racing	Chevrolet	28.950	186.529
16	21	Trevor Bayne	Wood Brothers Racing	Ford	28.950	186.529
17	11	Denny Hamlin	Joe Gibbs Racing	Toyota	28.960	186.464
18	27	Paul Menard	Richard Childress Racing	Chevrolet	28.963	186.445
19	83	Brian Vickers	Red Bull Racing Team	Toyota	28.980	186.335
20	2	Brad Keselowski	Penske Racing	Dodge	29.020	186.079
21	31	Jeff Burton	Richard Childress Racing	Chevrolet	29.024	186.053
22	22	Kurt Busch	Penske Racing	Dodge	29.032	186.002
23	42	Juan Pablo Montoya	Earnhardt Ganassi Racing	Chevrolet	29.037	185.970
24	47	Bobby Labonte	JTG Daugherty Racing	Toyota	29.081	185.688
25	00	David Reutimann	Michael Waltrip Racing	Toyota	29.100	185.567
26	29	Kevin Harvick	Richard Childress Racing	Chevrolet	29.114	185.478
27	13	Casey Mears	Germain Racing	Toyota	29.155	185.217
28	33	Clint Bowyer	Richard Childress Racing	Chevrolet	29.173	185.103
29	32	Mike Skinner	FAS Lane Racing	Ford	29.230	184.742
30	4	Kasey Kahne	Red Bull Racing Team	Toyota	29.273	184.470
31	87	Joe Nemechek	NEMCO Motorsports	Toyota	29.274	184.464
32	46	J. J. Yeley	Whitney Motorsports	Chevrolet	29.316	184.200
33	88	Dale Earnhardt Jr.	Hendrick Motorsports	Chevrolet	29.356	183.949
34	36	Dave Blaney	Tommy Baldwin Racing	Chevrolet	29.506	183.014
35	34	David Gilliland	Front Row Motorsports	Ford	29.507	183.007
36	60	Landon Cassill	Germain Racing	Toyota	29.659	182.070
37	09	Bill Elliott	Phoenix Racing	Chevrolet	29.674	181.977
38	7	Robby Gordon	Robby Gordon Motorsports	Dodge	29.768	181.403
39	38	Travis Kvapil	Front Row Motorsports	Ford	29.790	181.269
40	71	Andy Lally	TRG Motorsports	Chevrolet	30.098	179.414
41	37	Tony Raines	Front Row Motorsports	Ford	30.457	177.299
42	6	David Ragan	Roush Fenway Racing	Ford	-	-
43	66	Michael McDowell	HP Racing	Toyota	29.708	181.769
	Failed to Qualify					
	92	Brian Keselowski	K-Automotive Motorsports	Dodge	30.050	179.701
	Source:					

=== Race results ===
Pos	Car	Driver	Team	Manufacturer	Laps Run	Points
1	99	Carl Edwards	Roush Fenway Racing	Ford	267	47^{1}^{3}
2	14	Tony Stewart	Stewart–Haas Racing	Chevrolet	267	44^{2}
3	42	Juan Pablo Montoya	Earnhardt Ganassi Racing	Chevrolet	267	42^{1}
4	9	Marcos Ambrose	Richard Petty Motorsports	Ford	267	41^{1}
5	39	Ryan Newman	Stewart–Haas Racing	Chevrolet	267	39
6	56	Martin Truex Jr.	Michael Waltrip Racing	Toyota	267	39^{1}
7	11	Denny Hamlin	Joe Gibbs Racing	Toyota	267	37
8	88	Dale Earnhardt Jr.	Hendrick Motorsports	Chevrolet	267	36
9	22	Kurt Busch	Penske Racing	Dodge	267	36^{1}
10	83	Brian Vickers	Red Bull Racing Team	Toyota	267	34
11	17	Matt Kenseth	Roush Fenway Racing	Ford	267	34^{1}
12	27	Paul Menard	Richard Childress Racing	Chevrolet	267	33^{1}
13	00	David Reutimann	Michael Waltrip Racing	Toyota	267	32^{1}
14	4	Kasey Kahne	Red Bull Racing Team	Toyota	267	30
15	33	Clint Bowyer	Richard Childress Racing	Chevrolet	267	30^{1}
16	48	Jimmie Johnson	Hendrick Motorsports	Chevrolet	267	28
17	29	Kevin Harvick	Richard Childress Racing	Chevrolet	267	27
18	5	Mark Martin	Hendrick Motorsports	Chevrolet	267	26
19	43	A. J. Allmendinger	Richard Petty Motorsports	Ford	267	25
20	21	Trevor Bayne	Wood Brothers Racing	Ford	267	0^{4}
21	31	Jeff Burton	Richard Childress Racing	Chevrolet	267	23
22	6	David Ragan	Roush Fenway Racing	Ford	267	22
23	20	Joey Logano	Joe Gibbs Racing	Toyota	267	21
24	47	Bobby Labonte	JTG Daugherty Racing	Toyota	267	20
25	13	Casey Mears	Germain Racing	Toyota	267	19
26	2	Brad Keselowski	Penske Racing	Dodge	265	18
27	1	Jamie McMurray	Earnhardt Ganassi Racing	Chevrolet	264	17
28	16	Greg Biffle	Roush Fenway Racing	Ford	264	17^{1}
29	32	Mike Skinner	FAS Lane Racing	Ford	262	0^{4}
30	09	Bill Elliott	Phoenix Racing	Chevrolet	262	14
31	7	Robby Gordon	Robby Gordon Motorsports	Dodge	261	13
32	71	Andy Lally	TRG Motorsports	Chevrolet	261	12
33	38	Travis Kvapil	Front Row Motorsports	Ford	261	0^{4}
34	36	Dave Blaney	Tommy Baldwin Racing	Chevrolet	260	11^{1}
35	37	Tony Raines	Front Row Motorsports	Ford	258	9
36	24	Jeff Gordon	Hendrick Motorsports	Chevrolet	193	9^{1}
37	34	David Gilliland	Front Row Motorsports	Ford	147	7
38	18	Kyle Busch	Joe Gibbs Racing	Toyota	107	6
39	78	Regan Smith	Furniture Row Racing	Chevrolet	77	5
40	46	J. J. Yeley	Whitney Motorsports	Chevrolet	45	4
41	66	Michael McDowell	HP Racing	Toyota	41	3
42	87	Joe Nemechek	NEMCO Motorsports	Toyota	34	0^{4}
43	60	Landon Cassill	Germain Racing	Toyota	32	0^{4}
^{1} Includes one bonus point for leading a lap
^{2} Includes two bonus points for leading the most laps
^{3} Includes three bonus points for winning the race
^{4} Ineligible for championship points

== Standings after the race ==
Drivers' Championship standings

Pos	Driver	Points
1	Tony Stewart	113
2	Kurt Busch	113
3	Carl Edwards	106
4	Juan Pablo Montoya	106
5	Ryan Newman	103

Manufacturers' Championship standings

Pos	Manufacturer	Points
1	Ford	21
2	Chevrolet	18
3	Toyota	16
4	Dodge	11

- Note: Only the top five positions are included for the driver standings.

Previous race: 2011 Subway Fresh Fit 500	Sprint Cup Series; 2011 season	Next race: 2011 Jeff Byrd 500
