= 2012 Daytona 500 =

Auto race held at Daytona, United States in 2012

Race details
- Race 1 of 36 in the 2012 NASCAR Sprint Cup Series
- Date: February 27–28, 2012
- Location: Daytona International Speedway, Daytona Beach, Florida
- Course: Permanent racing facility 2.5 mi (4 km)
- Distance: 202 laps, 505 mi (812.718 km)
- Scheduled distance: 200 laps, 500 mi (804.672 km)
- Weather: Warm with temperatures approaching 80.1 °F (26.7 °C); wind speeds up to 12 miles per hour (19 km/h)
- Average speed: 140.256 miles per hour (225.720 km/h)
- Attendance: 140,000

Pole position
Driver	Carl Edwards	Roush Fenway Racing
- Time: 46.216

Qualifying race winners
Duel 1 Winner	Tony Stewart	Stewart–Haas Racing
Duel 2 Winner	Matt Kenseth	Roush Fenway Racing

Most laps led
Driver	Denny Hamlin	Joe Gibbs Racing
- Laps: 57

Winner
No. 17	Matt Kenseth	Roush Fenway Racing

Television in the United States
- Network: Fox
- Announcers: Mike Joy, Darrell Waltrip, Larry McReynolds
- Nielsen ratings: 8.0/14 (Final); 7.7/13 (Overnight); (13.699 million)

The 2012 Daytona 500 was the first stock car race of the 2012 NASCAR Sprint Cup Series season. The 54th iteration of the event, it was held between February 27 and 28, 2012 at Daytona International Speedway in Daytona Beach, Florida, before a crowd of 140,000. Matt Kenseth driving for Roush Fenway Racing took the 202-lap race for his first win of the season and his second Daytona 500 victory. Dale Earnhardt Jr. finished second and Greg Biffle was third.

The race was scheduled for February 26 but heavy rain forced NASCAR officials to delay it until February 27 at 7:02 p.m. EST. Carl Edwards, who won the pole position by posting the fastest lap in qualifying, was immediately passed by Biffle before the first turn. Biffle maintained this position until he was passed by Regan Smith on lap eleven. Denny Hamlin took over the lead after a second caution period and led the race for 57 laps, during which Biffle also led. Matt Kenseth assumed the first place on lap 146 and maintained it until a seventh caution period twelve laps later. The race was stopped for two hours and five minutes after Juan Pablo Montoya hit a jet dryer on lap 160, causing fuel to seep onto the track and catch fire. Kenseth regained the first position just before the lap 166 restart, and maintained it for the last thirty-eight laps to win the race.

The race had ten cautions and saw twenty-five lead changes by ten different drivers. The result gave Kenseth the Drivers' Championship lead with 47 points, five ahead of Earnhardt, Biffle, and Hamlin. Jeff Burton followed in fifth on 41 points. Ford led the Manufacturers' Championship with nine points, three ahead of Chevrolet in second. Toyota was third with four, and Dodge was fourth. The race attracted on average 13.69 million television viewers, with 36.5 million watching part or all of the race, making it the second most-watched 500 in history.

== Background ==
Daytona International Speedway, where the race was held

The 2012 Daytona 500 was the first of 36 scheduled stock car races of the 2012 NASCAR Sprint Cup Series, and the 54th edition of the event. It was scheduled to be held on February 27, 2012, in Daytona Beach, Florida, at Daytona International Speedway, a superspeedway that holds NASCAR races. The layout used for the Daytona 500 is a four-turn, 2.5-mile (4.0 km) superspeedway. Daytona's turns are banked at 31 degrees, and the front stretch—the location of the finish line—is banked at 18 degrees. Trevor Bayne was the race's defending winner.

The Daytona 500 was conceived by NASCAR founder Bill France Sr., who owned the Daytona International Speedway. The race was first held in 1959; it is the successor to shorter races held on beaches around Daytona Beach, Florida. The race has been the opening round of the NASCAR season since 1982. From 1988 it was one of four events that require cars to run restrictor plates; alongside the 400-mile (640 km) summer Daytona race and the two races at Talladega Superspeedway. The Daytona 500 offers the most prize money of any auto race held in the United States.

On February 20, 2011, NASCAR's vice president of operations Steve O'Donnell announced that the 2012 Daytona 500 would be moved from its traditional Presidents' Day weekend slot to the final Sunday of February. The decision was based on the possibility of an extended National Football League schedule; the Daytona 500 was moved to avoid a potential clash with the Super Bowl. This shortened the NASCAR season by one week; the company planned to maintain momentum during the early part of the year.

After the two-car style draft—also called tandem racing—dominated races held on restrictor plate tracks during 2011, NASCAR reduced the size of the radiators from five liters to two and the air intakes were moved towards the cars' fascia section. The size of the restrictor plate was reduced by 1/64 inch (0.4 mm) and the cars were required to run with softer springs and a smaller rear spoiler. These changes were intended to reduce the effectiveness of two-car style drafting and to make the cars more challenging to turn. Sprint Cup Series director John Darby stated, "We want to be able to give the teams more options when it comes to drafting and we want to be able to reduce the difference in the speeds between the tandem style of racing and more of the pack style of racing that the fans are accustomed to seeing".

In preparation for the race and to test the new car package, NASCAR held several test sessions on January 12–14, 2012. Test sessions began at 9:00 a.m. Eastern Standard Time (EST) (UTC–05:00), and were paused at midday for a lunch break. They then resumed at 1:00 pm. EST, before concluding at 5:00 pm. 31 drivers participated in the first session on the morning of January 12; Jeff Gordon was quickest with a speed of 192.773 mph (310.238 km/h), while Kyle Busch had the highest speed of 202.402 mph (325.734 km/h) during the second session in the afternoon. At the end of the second session, NASCAR announced that the opening of the restrictor plate would be increased by 1/32 inch (0.79 mm) to be 15/16 inch (2.4 cm) wide and the pressure release valve settings were reduced from 30 psi (2.1 bar) to 25 psi (1.7 bar).

On the second day, NASCAR allowed drivers to draft in packs to check the cars' responses. During the third session on the morning of January 13, in which 32 drivers took part, Martin Truex Jr. and Clint Bowyer were both quickest with a speed of 204.722 mph (329.468 km/h), and Kurt Busch recorded the fastest speed of 206.058 mph (331.618 km/h) in the fourth session held in the afternoon. Ryan Newman and Casey Mears decided to leave after the session. During the fifth session, held on the morning on January 14, 30 drivers took part; Kasey Kahne and Gordon were both quickest with a speed of 201.545 mph (324.355 km/h). After the session, Danica Patrick, Tony Stewart, Kurt Busch and Ricky Stenhouse Jr. left the circuit and NASCAR increased the pressure value from 20 psi (1.4 bar) to 25 psi (1.7 bar). Gordon was fastest in the sixth and final session held in the afternoon, with a speed of 200.562 mph (322.773 km/h).

During the 2012 Budweiser Shootout, some of the cars' engines overheated while driving in packs; NASCAR increased the engines' pressure release values from 25 psi (1.7 bar) to 28 psi (1.9 bar) to help reduce overheating and alleviate the effects of driving at high temperatures.

== Practice and qualification ==
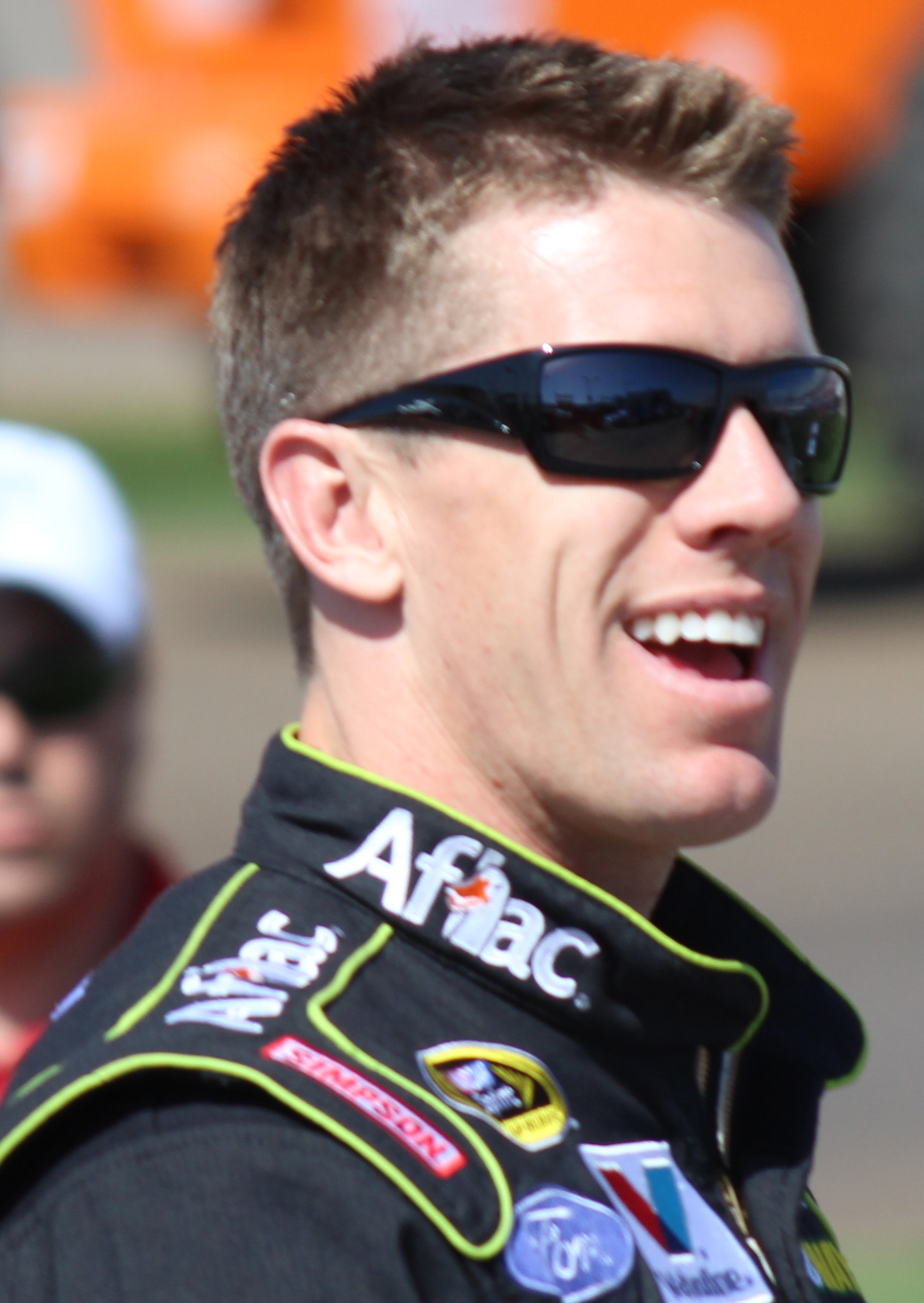
Carl Edwards qualified on pole, the eleventh of his career.

There were seven practice sessions held before the race. The first two were held on February 18 and ran for 120 and 105 minutes each. The next two on February 22 were shortened to 90 minutes each. Two days later, two more practice sessions were scheduled, which both ran for 60 minutes. The final practice session was held on February 25 and lasted 60 minutes. Greg Biffle lapped fastest at 46.537 seconds in the first session, 0.011 seconds quicker than Marcos Ambrose. Jeff Gordon, Bayne, Paul Menard, Dale Earnhardt Jr., Stewart, Matt Kenseth, Aric Almirola and Carl Edwards rounded out the session's top ten drivers. In the second practice session, Biffle remained fastest with a time of 46.574 seconds, followed by Bayne, Truex, Stewart and Mark Martin, Menard, Edwards, Ambrose, Gordon and A. J. Allmendinger.

There were forty-nine cars entered in the qualifier, NASCAR's qualifying procedure permitted forty-three to race. Each driver ran two laps, and unlike most races during the season, the qualifying session determined the first two positions, while the rest of the drivers qualified by the 2012 Gatorade Duels. Edwards clinched his eleventh pole position of his career, his first in the Daytona 500, with a time of 46.216 seconds. The time was the fastest recorded average speed since Jeff Gordon's pole lap in the 1999 race. He was joined on the front row of the grid by teammate Biffle. It was the first time since the 2007 race that Ford cars had the top two starting positions. Bowyer who recorded the 22nd fastest time, had his car twice fail the post-race inspection for height sticks and was required to start at the rear of the field in the second Gatorade Duel race. After the qualifier, Edwards commented, "It's huge to start this year for us and this company with the run today. This is the result of a lot of hard work this offseason and we are now ready to focus on how to win this Daytona 500."

Kenseth led the third practice session, with a time of 44.809 seconds. Bayne, Stenhouse, Ambrose, Martin, Bowyer, Michael McDowell, Kevin Harvick, Menard, and Kahne followed in the top ten. Brad Keselowski slowed to avoid Newman which caused Bowyer to turn into Keselowski, sending him spinning into the grass on the backstretch. Keselowski's car had sustained minor damage which meant he was not required to use his back-up car as mechanics were able to repair the damage. Almirola led fourth practice (where twenty-five drivers took part) with a lap of 45.065 seconds, nearly one-tenth of a second faster than David Stremme. David Ragan was third ahead of Robert Richardson Jr. and Biffle. During the session (where drivers ran in packs and drafted off each other), Juan Pablo Montoya made contact with Kahne, who was sent spinning into the grass on the frontstretch which caused parts of his car's nose to be torn off. Kahne was required to use his back-up car for the rest of Speedweeks.

Stewart and Kenseth were the winners of the Gatorade Duels. The qualifying grid was finalized with Stewart in third and Kenseth in fourth. Earnhardt, Regan Smith, Ambrose, Jimmie Johnson, Jeff Burton and Elliott Sadler completed the top ten. The six drivers that failed to qualify were Michael Waltrip, Richardson, Bill Elliott, Mike Wallace, Kenny Wallace and J. J. Yeley. After the duels, Patrick, David Gilliland, Montoya and Menard went to back-up cars because they were involved in wrecks during the first duel.

Edwards was fastest in fifth practice with a 45.301 seconds lap, one-thousand of a second in front of Almirola. Ambrose was third quickest, ahead of Montoya and Biffle. Kahne and Gordon were sixth and seventh quickest, within one second of Edwards' time. Kyle Busch (with a time of 45.026) led the sixth session ahead of Joey Logano who set an identical time to Kyle Busch. Kurt Busch had the third-fastest time. Denny Hamlin was next ahead of Stewart. Truex, Stenhouse, Allmendinger, Kesleowski and Gordon followed in the top ten. Gilliland's lap of 44.969 seconds topped the final practice session (where thirty-seven drivers participated), followed by Bayne, Stenhouse, Almirola, and Jeff Gordon in the top five positions. During the final practice session, Kurt Busch hit a bird which tore a small hole in the bottom of his radiator causing water to be drained from his car. He changed his car's engine because the damage could not be repaired.

=== Qualifying results ===
Pos	No.	Driver	Team	Manufacturer	Reason
1	99	Carl Edwards	Roush Fenway Racing	Ford	Pole Winner
2	16	Greg Biffle	Roush Fenway Racing	Ford	Outside Pole Winner
3	14	Tony Stewart	Stewart–Haas Racing	Chevrolet	Duel Race 1 Winner
4	17	Matt Kenseth	Roush Fenway Racing	Ford	Duel Race 2 Winner
5	88	Dale Earnhardt Jr.	Hendrick Motorsports	Chevrolet	Second in Gatorade Duel 1
6	78	Regan Smith	Furniture Row Racing	Chevrolet	Second in Gatorade Duel 2
7	9	Marcos Ambrose	Richard Petty Motorsports	Ford	Third in Gatorade Duel 1
8	48	Jimmie Johnson	Hendrick Motorsports	Chevrolet	Third in Gatorade Duel 2
9	31	Jeff Burton	Richard Childress Racing	Chevrolet	Fourth in Gatorade Duel 1
10	33	Elliott Sadler	Richard Childress Racing	Chevrolet	Fourth in Gatorade Duel 2
11	98	Michael McDowell	Phil Parsons Racing	Ford	Duel Race 1 transfer
12	20	Joey Logano	Joe Gibbs Racing	Toyota	Sixth in Gatorade Duel 2
13	29	Kevin Harvick	Richard Childress Racing	Chevrolet	Seventh in Gatorade Duel 1
14	18	Kyle Busch	Joe Gibbs Racing	Toyota	Seventh in Gatorade Duel 2
15	22	A. J. Allmendinger	Penske Racing	Dodge	Eighth in Gatorade Duel 1
16	24	Jeff Gordon	Hendrick Motorsports	Chevrolet	Eighth in Gatorade Duel 2
17	7	Robby Gordon	Robby Gordon Motorsports	Dodge	Duel Race 1 transfer
18	39	Ryan Newman	Stewart–Haas Racing	Chevrolet	Ninth in Gatorade Duel 1
19	1	Jamie McMurray	Earnhardt Ganassi Racing	Chevrolet	Tenth in Gatorade Duel 1
20	5	Kasey Kahne	Hendrick Motorsports	Chevrolet	Tenth in Gatorade Duel 2
21	6	Ricky Stenhouse Jr.	Roush Fenway Racing	Ford	Eleventh in Gatorade Duel 1
22	55	Mark Martin	Michael Waltrip Racing	Toyota	Eleventh in Gatorade Duel 2
23	2	Brad Keselowski	Penske Racing	Dodge	Thirteenth in Gatorade Duel 1
24	36	Dave Blaney	Tommy Baldwin Racing	Chevrolet	Duel Race 2 transfer
25	34	David Ragan	Front Row Motorsports	Ford	Fourteenth in Gatorade Duel 1
26	56	Martin Truex Jr.	Michael Waltrip Racing	Toyota	Thirteenth in Gatorade Duel 2
27	43	Aric Almirola	Richard Petty Motorsports	Ford	Fifteenth in Gatorade Duel 1
28	51	Kurt Busch	Phoenix Racing	Chevrolet	Fourteenth in Gatorade Duel 2
29	10	Danica Patrick	Stewart-Haas Racing	Chevrolet	Sixteenth in Gatorade Duel 1
30	15	Clint Bowyer	Michael Waltrip Racing	Toyota	Fifteenth in Gatorade Duel 2
31	11	Denny Hamlin	Joe Gibbs Racing	Toyota	Seventeenth in Gatorade Duel 1
32	47	Bobby Labonte	JTG Daugherty Racing	Toyota	Sixteenth in Gatorade Duel 2
33	38	David Gilliland	Front Row Motorsports	Ford	Twenty-second in Gatorade Duel 1
34	87	Joe Nemechek	NEMCO Motorsports	Toyota	Duel Race 2 transfer
35	42	Juan Pablo Montoya	Earnhardt Ganassi Racing	Chevrolet	Twenty-third in Gatorade Duel 1
36	13	Casey Mears	Germain Racing	Ford	Eighteenth in Gatorade Duel 2
37	27	Paul Menard	Richard Childress Racing	Chevrolet	Twenty-fourth in Gatorade Duel 1
38	93	David Reutimann	BK Racing	Toyota	Twenty-third in Gatorade Duel 2
39	83	Landon Cassill	BK Racing	Toyota	Twenty-fifth in Gatorade Duel 1
40	21	Trevor Bayne	Wood Brothers Racing	Ford	Speed – 193.615
41	26	Tony Raines	Front Row Motorsports	Ford	Speed – 192.534
42	30	David Stremme	Inception Motorsports	Toyota	Speed – 191.963
43	32	Terry Labonte	FAS Lane Racing	Ford	Champion's Provisional
Failed to qualify
44	09	Kenny Wallace	RAB Racing	Toyota	Speed – 191.567
45	40	Michael Waltrip	Hillman Racing	Toyota	Speed – 191.180
46	97	Bill Elliott	NEMCO Motorsports	Toyota	Speed – 189.950
47	37	Mike Wallace	Rick Ware Racing	Ford	Speed – 189.853
48	23	Robert Richardson Jr.	R3 Motorsports	Toyota	Speed – 188.438
49	49	J. J. Yeley	Robinson-Blakeney Racing	Toyota	Speed – 187.954
^{1} Car moved to the back of the grid for going to a backup car (#10, #27, #38, #42), changing engines (#51).

== Race ==
The race, broadcast live on television in the United States by Fox and by TSN2 in Canada, was due to start at 1:00 pm. EST, but heavy rain prompted NASCAR officials to delay it until the afternoon of February 27, making it the first Daytona 500 to be postponed; because of this, wrestler John Cena, who was supposed to wave the green flag, was in Portland for a WWE commitment. Further rain fell during February 27, delaying the race until 7:02 pm. EST, making it the first race to start in primetime and to avoid more morning and afternoon rain. Smaller rear spoilers, bigger restrictor plates and a gripper track surface following day-long rain and cooler conditions were expected to make the race quicker. Commentary was provided by Mike Joy, with analysis given by retired driver Darrell Waltrip and former crew chief Larry McReynolds. Pastor Sonny Gallman of Central Baptist Church, Daytona, began the pre-race ceremonies with the invocation. Daytona Beach resident Melisa TenBroeck performed the U.S. national anthem, and Wood Brothers Racing co-founder Leonard Wood gave the command for the drivers to start their engines. During the pace laps, Patrick, Menard, Montoya and Gilliland moved to the back of the grid because they had switched to their backup cars; Kurt Busch did the same because he had changed his car's engine. Kahne did not move to the rear because he changed to his backup car before the Gatorade Duels.

Weather conditions at the start were cloudy with the air temperature at 69 °F (21 °C). Biffle accelerated from the start line quicker than his teammate Edwards, leading him at the first turn. At the start of lap two a five car crash was triggered by Sadler making contact with Johnson in the tri-oval; Johnson's car spun sideways and caught those of Patrick, Kurt Busch, Ragan and Bayne. The incident triggered the first caution of the race and the pace car. Johnson and Ragan were forced to retire but Patrick, Bayne and Kurt Busch drove back to their garages for repairs. None of the drivers who were involved in the accident sustained injuries. The race restarted on lap eight, with Biffle leading Kenseth and Edwards. On the eleventh lap, Smith took the lead; one lap later Biffle moved back into the lead in turn three with aid from teammate Edwards.

On lap 13, Newman looped his car on the backstretch at the exit of the second corner without making contact with the wall; a second caution was issued, during which the leaders, including Biffle, made pit stops. Newman's left-front tire was unsecured and he collided with Allmendinger on pit road. Menard and Hamlin—both of whom chose not to pit—led the field back to speed at the restart on lap 17; by the end of the lap Hamiln had the lead. Hamlin began to pull away from the rest of the field, with Menard in his tow as the leaders began to run in single file. After starting the race in 26th, Truex had moved up 18 positions to eighth by lap 21, and Bowyer had moved up 20 positions to be running in tenth. Biffle tried to pass Truex for seventh on the 23rd lap but Truex kept the position. Both drivers continued to battle for the next two laps. By lap 25, Hamlin was still leading with Menard, Ragan, Logano, Jeff Burton, Ambrose and Truex in the top seven positions. Bayne rejoined the race on lap 37.

On lap 44, Burton, with assistance from Biffle, moved into the lead on the outside of the exit of turn two. Hamlin, who had dropped to third, attempted a passing manoeuvre around the outside for the lead one lap later but dropped to sixth. Green flag pit stops began on lap 56; most of the leaders, including Burton, made pit stops on lap 59. Gordon moved into the lead on lap 61 and began to pull away from Burton. Three laps later, debris was reported in turn two, triggering the third caution. Some drivers, including Gordon, made pit stops for fuel during the caution. During Kenseth's pit stop on lap 66, his team made repairs to his car, which had a water pressure problem. His mechanics changed the car's water and Kenseth rejoined the race in 33rd.

Burton led the field at the restart on lap 68, followed by Biffle, Ambrose, Truex and Kyle Busch. Biffle passed Burton to gain the lead in turn one, with Ambrose moving into second by turn three. Burton had dropped to sixth position by lap 76; Truex had moved ahead of Biffle around the outside for the lead on the same lap. Biffle reclaimed the lead momentarily on lap 78 but Truex overtook him. Three laps later, the fourth caution of the race was prompted when going into turn three Jeff Gordon's engine failed, of which the cause was undetermined, and flames appeared from his car. Most of the drivers, including Truex, made pit stops under caution.

Terry Labonte chose not to stop and led the field at the lap 86 restart, followed by Biffle, who reclaimed the lead on the same lap. Ambrose made contact with Terry Labonte coming off the fourth turn on lap 88 and rested at the side of the pit road; the race's fifth caution was issued. Some drivers chose to pit under caution. The race restarted on lap 92 with Biffle leading from Ambrose on the outside lane and Truex. Eight laps later, Truex, assisted by Hamlin, passed Biffle going into the third turn to take the lead and earned $200,000 for leading at the halfway point. On the 102nd lap, Stewart took over the lead on the backstretch before Hamlin went underneath him betweens turns three and four to reclaim the first position. Two laps later, Truex had moved back into second place. By lap 110, pole position driver Edwards was running in 21st and was reporting fluctuations in his car's fuel pressure.

Bowyer started to slow on lap 127, running out of fuel. He could not go to pit road because two faster cars blocked his entry. He coasted on the side of the track before stopping at turn two, triggering the sixth caution on the 129th lap. Most of the leaders, including Hamlin, made pit stops under caution. Martin led the field up to speed at the restart on lap 133; he was followed by Smith and Biffle. On the same lap, Biffle, with aid from Hamlin, passed Martin for the lead entering the third turn. Biffle lost the lead when Hamlin passed him on lap 139; five laps later his teammate Logano took over first place. Kenseth carried extra momentum and drove to the high side of the fourth turn to take the lead from Logano on the 146th lap. Two laps later, Earnhardt moved into second after passing Logano. The top fifteen drivers were separated by less than a second by lap 154.

=== Jet dryer incident ===
Stremme's engine failed on lap 157 and his car spun in front of a small pack of traffic after his car dropped oil on the track, causing the seventh caution. The leaders, which included Kenseth, made pit stops and some for two tires. Under caution, teams employed varying strategies as rain was approaching the circuit. Juan Pablo Montoya reported to his team that he felt a vibration on his car after leaving pit road; he returned to his pit box on lap 159 where his pit crew checked underneath his car for the vibration which they could not find. He then drove at racing speed after rejoining the track at turn two to catch up with the pace car when a rear trailing arm on his car broke at turn three where two jet dryers were clearing debris. He lost control, skidded up the banking and collided with a trailer-mounted jet engine filled with 200 US gallons (760 L; 170 imp gal) of jet kerosene, destroying it and rupturing the fuel tank, which started leaking fuel onto the track. Montoya drifted down the track onto the infield grass. Almost a minute later, something caused the jet fuel to ignite, creating a wall of fire across the track. The conflagration caused a red flag to be shown.

Over the course of two hours and five minutes, NASCAR officials extinguished the fire, cleaned and repatched the track and used quick-dry to dry the oil. Montoya climbed out of his car on his own, but the driver of the safety truck, 52-year-old Duane Barnes, had to be assisted down the banking. Montoya and Barnes were taken to the nearby Halifax Medical Center for examination. The jet dryer and the truck it was attached to was removed from the track by two forklifts. Light rain hit at the track and later broke up. Keselowski gained a large amount of attention during the red flag when he used an iPhone to photograph his view of the accident scene through the windshield and post it to Twitter. Dave Blaney, Landon Cassill, Tony Raines and Gilliland were the leaders prior to the red flag, having not made pit stops under caution. Edwards and Kyle Busch removed tear-offs from their windshields and were required to go to the back of the field.

=== Finish ===
The race resumed under caution at 11:57 pm. EST, following the red flag period that lasted two hours, five minutes and twenty-nine seconds. Mears ran out of fuel at turn two and had to be pushed to pit road by the recovery truck. Blaney, Cassill, Raines and Gilliland made pit stops for fuel, allowing Kenseth to take the lead for the lap 166 restart, ahead of teammate Biffle and Earnhardt in third, and maintained the lead for the next ten laps. On lap 176, the eighth caution was issued after Mears made contact with Almirola, who regained control of his car, but Mears went into the side of Ambrose in the first turn. The restart was delayed for one lap because Logano was moved to the back of the field for failing to maintain car speed. Kenseth led the field at the lap 183 restart, followed by Biffle.

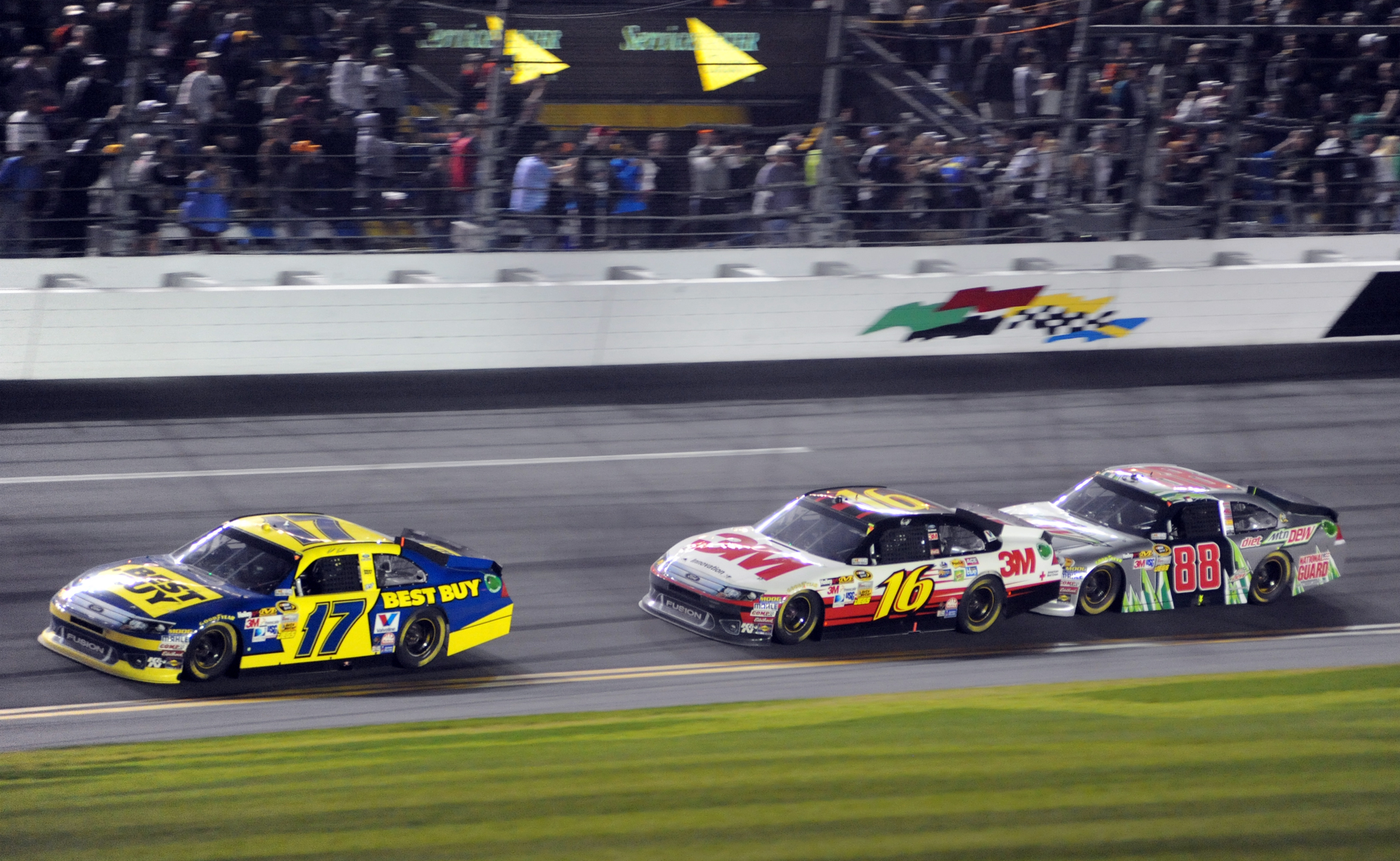
Matt Kenseth leads Greg Biffle and Dale Earnhardt Jr. through the tri-oval

Five laps later, however, a multi-car collision occurred on the frontstretch after Jamie McMurray cut a tire, veered off and collided with Kahne, triggering an eleven car chain-reaction accident involving Edwards, Stewart, Almirola, Keselowski and Smith. Earnhardt's and Stewart's cars sustained minor damage; the ninth caution of the race was issued. The race restarted on lap 194, with Kenseth again leading. As the cars were running single file, A second multi-car collision occurred on lap 197 the entry to turn one, collecting a total of 18 cars including Stewart, Blaney, Stenhouse, Cassill, Kyle Busch and Ryan Newman, triggered the final caution of the race. At the lap 201 restart, a green–white–checkered finish extended the race to 202 laps, with Kenseth leading Biffle, Hamlin, Earnhardt and Burton. Kenseth withstood pressure from Biffle and Earnhardt over the final two laps and crossed the finish line on lap 202 to win his second Daytona 500. Biffle weaved on the backstretch to block Earnhardt but the Hendrick Motorsports driver passed Biffle leaving turn four at the finish for second. Hamlin finished fourth, and Burton was fifth. Menard, Harvick, Edwards, Logano and Martin completed the top ten finishers. The race had a total of ten cautions and twenty-five lead changes among ten different drivers.

=== After the race ===
I have to give a lot of credit to Doug Yates and the guys at the engine shop. We had great horsepower. I could get a pretty good start on the bottom and either Denny or Dale Jr. could push me for awhile and then they just couldn't stay attached and I would get away from them just in time to get in front of Greg and the two of us together could make some unbelievable speed. I have to thank Greg. We worked together really good all day long. He had a really fast car all day as well.

— Kenseth, speaking in victory line about his second Daytona 500 win.

Kenseth appeared in the victory lane to celebrate his first victory of the season; earning $1,589,390 for the victory. Kenseth's victory was the 300th for his team Roush Fenway Racing in all three major series of NASCAR. Following his win, Kenseth said, "It feels great. I wasn't expecting to win when I woke up this morning. It feels good to be sitting here", and, "I think the 16 [Biffle] had one of the strongest cars all week, and ours was right there as well. It took a long time to get to the front, but like Thursday, once we were in the front it was hard for anyone to get locked on to you." Earnhardt, who finished in second place, said, "We couldn't ever get to Matt. I kind of waited until the last minute. I thought it was a great race. I want to thank the fans for sticking around on a Monday night and everyone who tuned in at home. Sorry about the delay and everything." Biffle, who took third, said, "We had a great speed weeks. Coming out of here with a third place finish is really exciting for us."

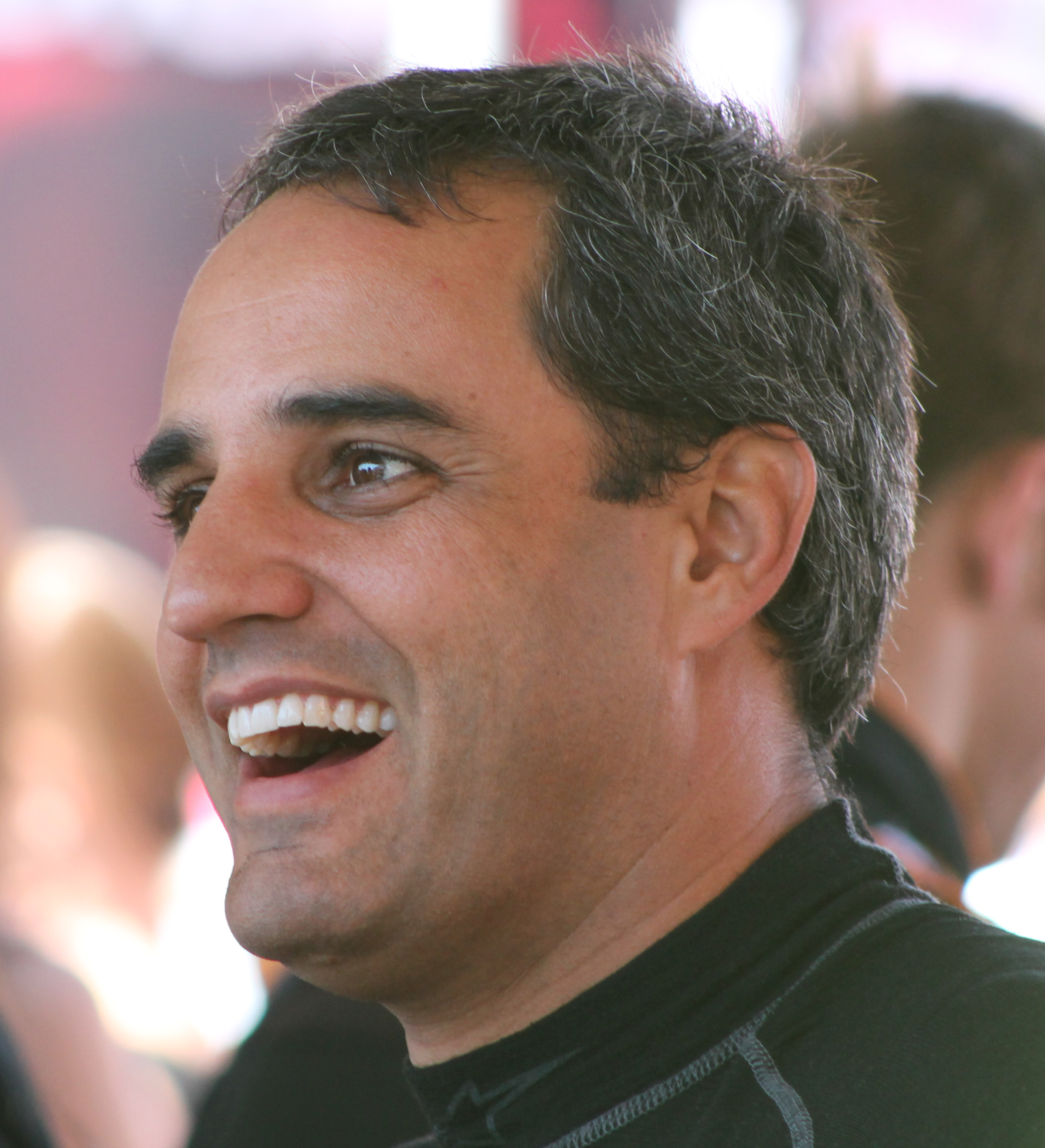
Juan Pablo Montoya (pictured in 2014) collided with a jet dryer which caused the race to be stopped and garnered much media attention.

Montoya expressed surprise over the crash where he hit a jet dryer under the race's seventh caution, "I've hit a lot of things—but a jet dryer?". He also said his helmet was singed in the fire and he had an aching foot. NASCAR President Mike Helton was also surprised over the incident, "You would think after 65 years and running all the races that NASCAR has run ... that you've seen about everything. You do think about, 'Oh, my gosh, if that can happen, what else can happen?' " Track worker Barnes thanked the fans and Montoya for their concerns. International Speedway Corporation president Joie Chitwood III said that track officials abided by standard procedures when clearing the track, "The team was prepared. The expertise was there. The training was there. The teamwork with NASCAR was there." A NASCAR spokesperson said, "Things were operating in a normal fashion ... it was an extraordinary circumstance that occurred when something went awry in the No. 42 car.", and, "Under caution, it is standard for a car to 'catch up' to the rest of the field, which is what the No. 42 car was doing." Montoya's car was examined by NASCAR officials before it returned to Earnhardt Ganassi Racing's shop in Concord, North Carolina. NASCAR did not fine Keselowski for tweeting during the red flag period and was allowed to keep his iPhone in his pocket for the rest of the season.

Later in the week, track officials conducted a thorough analysis of the track in turn three and determined the damage was worse than originally thought. A second patch job was conducted for the track's upcoming Daytona Bike Week events in March. After the Bike Week, the affected area of track was completely removed and resurfaced by Lane Construction—the same company that resurfaced the entire track prior to the 2011 Daytona 500. Repairs were completed in time for the Coke Zero 400 in July. From the Subway Fresh Fit 500 onward, NASCAR required that an additional pace car would be behind the last jet dryer on track in all three national series and jet dryer drivers were allowed to wear helmets and fire suits for extra protection. The jet dryer incident was described as "one of the most bizarre events" in the history of NASCAR and the Daytona 500 by various American media organizations.

Two days after the race, Hendrick Motorsports was penalized for Johnson's car. The penalty, for "actions detrimental to stock car racing", (Note: The penalty was for unapproved car body modifications; a part of the car had been modified to enhance aerodynamic performance. Johnson's car was found to have issues with its c-pillars during a February 17 inspection.) included a $100,000 fine and a six-race suspension for crew chief Chad Knaus and car chief Ron Malec and the loss of 25 owner and driver points for Jeff Gordon and Johnson. Both Knaus and Malec were placed on probation until May 9, 2012, and were suspended from NASCAR until April 18, 2012. Speed analyst and former driver Kyle Petty thought the penalties went too far, stating that the car was never raced and questioned why NASCAR issued the penalties. Hendrick Motorsports immediately announced it would appeal the decision; Knaus and Malec were allowed to work with the team during the appeal. The team lost the initial appeal on March 13, and made a final appeal to NASCAR National Commissioner John Middlebrook. As a result of the final appeal held on March 20, Knaus and Malec's six-race suspension was lifted and the points penalties to Johnson and Jeff Gordon were rescinded; however, the $100,000 fine administered to Knaus was upheld.

As this was the first race of the season, Kenseth led the Drivers' Championship with 47 points, followed by Earnhardt, Biffle and Hamlin, who were all tied for second on 42 points. Burton followed in fifth on 40 points. Ford became leader in the Manufacturers' Championship with nine points. Chevrolet was in second with six points, Toyota in third place with four points, one point ahead of Dodge in fourth. The race had an average television audience of 13.69 million viewers. An estimated 36.5 million total viewers watched all or part of the race, which was a 22 percent increase from the previous year's event. It became the most viewed NASCAR race in Fox's history and was the network's highest rated Monday night since Game Five of the 2010 World Series sixteen months previously. The race garnered the highest ratings in the 18–49 demographic, and was also the second most watched Daytona 500 behind the 2006 race. The race took three hours, thirty-six minutes and two seconds to complete, and the margin of victory was 0.210 seconds.

=== Race results ===
Pos	No.	Driver	Team	Manufacturer	Laps	Points
1	17	Matt Kenseth	Roush Fenway Racing	Ford	202	47^{1}^{3}
2	88	Dale Earnhardt Jr.	Hendrick Motorsports	Chevrolet	202	42
3	16	Greg Biffle	Roush Fenway Racing	Ford	202	42^{1}
4	11	Denny Hamlin	Joe Gibbs Racing	Toyota	202	42^{2}
5	31	Jeff Burton	Richard Childress Racing	Chevrolet	202	40^{1}
6	27	Paul Menard	Richard Childress Racing	Chevrolet	202	39^{1}
7	29	Kevin Harvick	Richard Childress Racing	Chevrolet	202	37
8	99	Carl Edwards	Roush Fenway Racing	Ford	202	36
9	20	Joey Logano	Joe Gibbs Racing	Toyota	202	36^{1}
10	55	Mark Martin	Michael Waltrip Racing	Toyota	202	35^{1}
11	15	Clint Bowyer	Michael Waltrip Racing	Toyota	202	33
12	56	Martin Truex Jr.	Michael Waltrip Racing	Toyota	202	33^{1}
13	9	Marcos Ambrose	Richard Petty Motorsports	Ford	202	31
14	47	Bobby Labonte	JTG Daugherty Racing	Toyota	202	30
15	36	Dave Blaney	Tommy Baldwin Racing	Chevrolet	202	30^{1}
16	14	Tony Stewart	Stewart–Haas Racing	Chevrolet	202	29^{1}
17	18	Kyle Busch	Joe Gibbs Racing	Toyota	202	27
18	32	Terry Labonte	FAS Lane Racing	Ford	202	27^{1}
19	26	Tony Raines	Front Row Motorsports	Ford	202	25
20	6	Ricky Stenhouse Jr.	Roush Fenway Racing	Ford	202	–^{4}
21	39	Ryan Newman	Stewart–Haas Racing	Chevrolet	202	23
22	83	Landon Cassill	BK Racing	Toyota	202	22
23	38	David Gilliland	Front Row Motorsports	Ford	201	21
24	78	Regan Smith	Furniture Row Racing	Chevrolet	200	21^{1}
25	13	Casey Mears	Germain Racing	Ford	199	19
26	93	David Reutimann	BK Racing	Toyota	196	18
27	33	Elliott Sadler	Richard Childress Racing	Chevrolet	196	–^{4}
28	87	Joe Nemechek	NEMCO Motorsports	Toyota	194	–^{4}
29	5	Kasey Kahne	Hendrick Motorsports	Chevrolet	189	15
30	98	Michael McDowell	Phil Parsons Racing	Ford	189	14
31	1	Jamie McMurray	Earnhardt Ganassi Racing	Chevrolet	188	13
32	2	Brad Keselowski	Penske Racing	Dodge	187	12
33	43	Aric Almirola	Richard Petty Motorsports	Ford	187	11
34	22	A. J. Allmendinger	Penske Racing	Dodge	177	10
35	21	Trevor Bayne	Wood Brothers Racing	Ford	164	–^{4}
36	42	Juan Pablo Montoya	Earnhardt Ganassi Racing	Chevrolet	159	8
37	30	David Stremme	Inception Motorsports	Toyota	156	7
38	10	Danica Patrick	Stewart–Haas Racing	Chevrolet	138	–^{4}
39	51	Kurt Busch	Phoenix Racing	Chevrolet	113	5
40	24	Jeff Gordon	Hendrick Motorsports	Chevrolet	81	5^{1}
41	7	Robby Gordon	Robby Gordon Motorsports	Dodge	25	3
42	48	Jimmie Johnson	Hendrick Motorsports	Chevrolet	1	2
43	34	David Ragan	Front Row Motorsports	Ford	1	1
^{1} Includes one bonus point for leading a lap
^{2} Includes two bonus points for leading the most laps
^{3} Includes three bonus points for winning the race
^{4} Ineligible for championship points

== Standings after the race ==
Drivers' Championship standings

Pos	Driver	Points
1	Matt Kenseth	47
2	Dale Earnhardt Jr.	42 (−5)
3	Greg Biffle	42 (−5)
4	Denny Hamlin	42 (−5)
5	Jeff Burton	40 (−7)

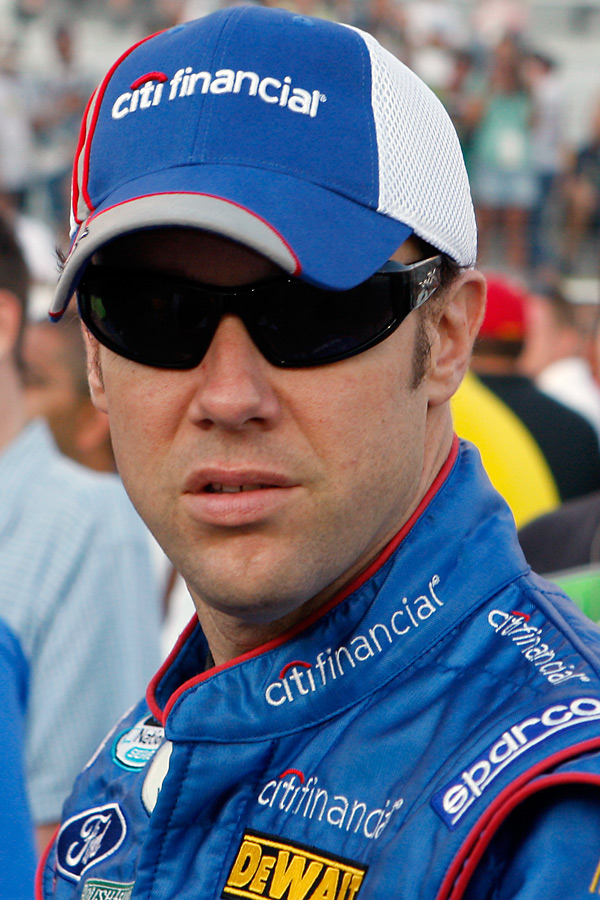
Kenseth (pictured in 2009) became the points leader as a result of his win.

Manufacturers' Championship standings

Pos	Manufacturer	Points
1	Ford	9
2	Chevrolet	6 (−3)
3	Toyota	4 (−5)
4	Dodge	3 (−6)

- Note: Only the top five positions are included for the driver standings.

== Footnotes ==
Previous race: 2011 Ford 400	Sprint Cup Series; 2012 season	Next race: 2012 Subway Fresh Fit 500
