= 2012 Gatorade Duels =

Stock car race

Race details
- Date: February 23, 2012
- Location: Daytona International Speedway, Daytona Beach, Florida
- Course: Permanent racing facility 2.5 mi (4 km)
- Distance: Race 1: 60 laps, 150 mi (240 km); Race 2: 60 laps, 150 mi (240 km)
- Avg Speed: Race 1: 159.104 miles per hour (256.053 km/h); Race 2: 194.175 miles per hour (312.494 km/h)
- Weather: Temperatures up to 86 °F (30 °C); wind speeds up to 28 miles per hour (45 km/h)

Race 1
- Pole position: Carl Edwards – Roush Fenway Racing
- Most laps led: Denny Hamlin – Joe Gibbs Racing – (27)
- Winner: Tony Stewart – Stewart–Haas Racing

Race 2
- Pole position: Greg Biffle – Roush Fenway Racing
- Most laps led: Greg Biffle – Roush Fenway Racing – (40)
- Winner: Matt Kenseth – Roush Fenway Racing

Television
- Network: Speed
- Announcers: Mike Joy, Darrell Waltrip, Larry McReynolds

The 2012 Gatorade Duels were a pair of stock car races held on February 23, 2012, at Daytona International Speedway in Daytona Beach, Florida. The 60-lap races, which drew 80,000 spectators, served as qualifiers for the 2012 Daytona 500, the premier event of the 2012 NASCAR Sprint Cup Series. Stewart–Haas Racing's Tony Stewart won the first race, with Dale Earnhardt Jr. second, and Marcos Ambrose third. Roush Fenway Racing's Matt Kenseth won the second race, marking Kenseth's and his team's first victory in the Gatorade Duels. Regan Smith took second and Jimmie Johnson was third.

Carl Edwards led the first race from pole position on the first lap but shared the lead Stewart for the next three laps. Following that, Earnhardt took the lead on the fifth lap and held it until a caution period for a multi-car accident on lap nine. Denny Hamlin gained the lead on lap 15, but Stewart reclaimed it a lap later. With a pass on Stewart on the 17th lap, Hamlin reclaimed the lead and held it until his pit stop 26 laps later. Stewart took the lead on lap 43 and held it for the next 17 laps and two caution periods to win the first Gatorade Duel. There were three cautions and eight lead changes among five different drivers in the first race.

Greg Biffle was the early leader in the second race. Kenseth passed Biffle on the fourth lap for the lead. On the 13th lap, Joey Logano and Kyle Busch overtook him for the first two places. Biffle had passed Kyle Busch by lap 23 and retained the lead until his pit stop 14 laps later. Kenseth attempted a race-winning slingshot with three laps remaining in the race, overtaking Biffle when the final lap began, and he maintained it to win the second Gatorade Duel. There were five lead changes among five different drivers, and no cautions were given throughout the second race.

== Background ==
Daytona International Speedway, where the race was held

The Gatorade Duels were a duo of stock car racing qualifiers held on February 23, 2012, in Daytona Beach, Florida, at Daytona International Speedway, a superspeedway that holds NASCAR races. Its standard track is a four-turn, 2.5-mile (4.0 km) superspeedway. Daytona's turns are banked at 31 degrees and the front stretch (the location of the finish line) is banked at 18 degrees. The defending winners of the races were Kurt Busch and Jeff Burton.

In the early years, qualifying for the Daytona 500 took various forms: one timed lap, an average of two laps, or the better of two laps. The concept of having two separate races to determine the starting lineup of the Daytona 500 dates back to the first event in 1959. The first of the two 100 mi (160 km) qualification races featured Convertible class cars, while the second featured Grand National cars. The races were 100 mi (160 km) from 1960 and 1967, and 125 mi (201 km) in 1969. Prior to 1971, the races yielded points to the Drivers' Championship. Large well-established teams regard the races as practice for the Daytona 500, although successfully qualifying for the event would allow smaller less-established teams to compete in future NASCAR events during the season. If the team did not qualify, it risked closing until sponsorship could be secured.

The top 35 drivers were assigned to Gatorade Duel races based on their Daytona 500 qualifying positions. The first Duel featured drivers who qualified in odd-numbered positions, as well as the 2012 Daytona 500 pole winner. The second Duel featured competitors who qualified in even-numbered positions. The results of both Duels determined the drivers' starting places in the Daytona 500. The fastest drivers who did not qualify in the top 35 filled positions 40 to 42. An eligible previous champion took the 43rd spot. In the absence of a former champion, the 43rd position would be filled by the next-fastest driver. Two eligible drivers outside the top 35 qualified for the Daytona 500 by winning two transfer slots in each Duel.

After some of the cars' engines overheated while traveling in packs during the 2012 Budweiser Shootout, NASCAR increased the engines' pressure release values from 25 psi (1.7 bar) to 28 psi (1.9 bar) to help reduce overheating and mitigate the consequences of high-temperature driving.

== Practice and qualification ==
Two 90-minute practice sessions were held on February 22. Matt Kenseth was fastest in the first practice session with a time of 44.809 seconds. Trevor Bayne was second-quickest with a lap-time 0.009 seconds slower. Ricky Stenhouse Jr. was third-fastest, ahead of Marcos Ambrose, Mark Martin, Clint Bowyer, Michael McDowell and Kevin Harvick. Paul Menard and Kasey Kahne. During the session, Brad Keselowski slowed to avoid Ryan Newman, forcing Bowyer to turn into Keselowski, whose car spun into the grass on the backstretch. Keselowski's car sustained minor damage, which could be repaired and he did not need to use a backup car. Aric Almirola led the second practice, in which 25 drivers competed, with a lap of 45.065 seconds—nearly one-tenth of a second faster than David Stremme. David Ragan was third, ahead of Robert Richardson Jr. and Greg Biffle. Bobby Labonte, Joe Nemechek, Bill Elliott, Michael Waltrip and Kahne completed the top ten ahead of the races.

During the session, which saw drivers running in packs and drafted off each other, Juan Pablo Montoya collided with Kahne and sent his car spinning into the grass on the front stretch, tearing off some of its nose. Kahne was required to use a backup car for the rest of Speedweeks. Because the qualifying grids were determined by the order in which drivers qualified in Daytona 500 pole position qualifying, Carl Edwards started from pole in the first race and Biffle in the second. Edwards was joined on the grid's front row by Dale Earnhardt Jr., with Ambrose in third. Stenhouse and Bayne started in fourth and fifth positions respectively. Biffle was joined by Mears on the front row for the second race, with Jeff Gordon in third. Martin Truex Jr. started fourth, and Martin began from fifth. The thirteen drivers who were not guaranteed to qualify for the Daytona 500 and were required to get into the event on speed or being the highest-placed two drivers who were not guaranteed entry were Elliott, Bayne, Robby Gordon, Kenny Wallace, Richardson, Tony Raines, Stremme, Dave Blaney, Mike Wallace, Waltrip, J. J. Yeley, Nemechek, and McDowell.

=== Qualifying 1 and 2 results ===
Race 1					Race 2				
Grid	No.	Driver	Team	Manufacturer	Grid	No.	Driver	Team	Manufacturer
1	99	Carl Edwards	Roush Fenway Racing	Ford	1	16	Greg Biffle	Roush Fenway Racing	Ford
2	88	Dale Earnhardt Jr.	Hendrick Motorsports	Chevrolet	2	13	Casey Mears	Germain Racing	Ford
3	9	Marcos Ambrose	Richard Petty Motorsports	Ford	3	24	Jeff Gordon	Hendrick Motorsports	Chevrolet
4	6	Ricky Stenhouse Jr.	Roush Fenway Racing	Ford	4	56	Martin Truex Jr.	Michael Waltrip Racing	Toyota
5	21	Trevor Bayne	Wood Brothers Racing	Ford	5	55	Mark Martin	Michael Waltrip Racing	Toyota
6	14	Tony Stewart	Stewart–Haas Racing	Chevrolet	6	48	Jimmie Johnson	Hendrick Motorsports	Chevrolet
7	43	Aric Almirola	Richard Petty Motorsports	Ford	7	17	Matt Kenseth	Roush Fenway Racing	Ford
8	27	Paul Menard	Richard Childress Racing	Chevrolet	8	39	Ryan Newman	Stewart–Haas Racing	Chevrolet
9	34	David Ragan	Front Row Motorsports	Ford	9	20	Joey Logano	Joe Gibbs Racing	Toyota
10	22	A. J. Allmendinger	Penske Racing	Dodge	10	5	Kasey Kahne	Hendrick Motorsports	Chevrolet
11	2	Brad Keselowski	Penske Racing	Dodge	11	26	Tony Raines	Front Row Motorsports	Ford
12	29	Kevin Harvick	Richard Childress Racing	Chevrolet	12	18	Kyle Busch	Joe Gibbs Racing	Toyota
13	31	Jeff Burton	Richard Childress Racing	Chevrolet	13	09	Kenny Wallace	RAB Racing	Toyota
14	42	Juan Pablo Montoya	Earnhardt Ganassi Racing	Chevrolet	14	36	Dave Blaney	Tommy Baldwin Racing	Chevrolet
15	30	David Stremme	Inception Motorsports	Toyota	15	51	Kurt Busch	Phoenix Racing	Chevrolet
16	1	Jamie McMurray	Earnhardt Ganassi Racing	Chevrolet	16	33	Elliott Sadler	Richard Childress Racing	Chevrolet
17	10	Danica Patrick	Tommy Baldwin Racing	Chevrolet	17	87	Joe Nemechek	NEMCO Motorsports	Toyota
18	32	Terry Labonte	FAS Lane Racing	Ford	18	78	Regan Smith	Furniture Row Racing	Chevrolet
19	40	Michael Waltrip	Hillman Racing	Toyota	19	47	Bobby Labonte	JTG Daugherty Racing	Toyota
20	11	Denny Hamlin	Joe Gibbs Racing	Toyota	20	97	Bill Elliott	NEMCO Motorsports	Toyota^{1}
21	98	Michael McDowell	Phil Parsons Racing	Ford	21	93	David Reutimann	BK Racing	Toyota
22	83	Landon Cassill	BK Racing	Toyota	22	23	Robert Richardson Jr.	R3 Motorsports	Toyota
23	38	David Gilliland	Front Row Motorsports	Ford	23	49	J. J. Yeley	Robinson-Blakeney Racing	Toyota
24	37	Mike Wallace	Rick Ware Racing	Ford	24	15	Clint Bowyer	Michael Waltrip Racing	Toyota^{1}
25	7	Robby Gordon	Robby Gordon Motorsports	Dodge					
^{1} Car moved to the rear of the grid for going to a backup car (#5), changing engines (#97) and for having a qualifying time disallowed (#15).

== Races ==
The qualifying races for the 2012 Daytona 500 began at 2:00 p.m. Eastern Standard Time and was broadcast live on television in the United States by Speed, and by TSN2 in Canada. Commentary was provided by Mike Joy, with analysis given by former driver Darrell Waltrip and former crew chief Larry McReynolds.

Both races lasted for 60 laps over a distance of 150 mi (240 km), and attended by 80,000 spectators. The weather on the grid before start of the first race were hot and humid, with the air temperature was 82 °F (28 °C); a ten percent chance of rain was forecast. Dr. L. Ronald Durham of Greater Friendship Missionary Baptist Church in Daytona Beach, Florida began the pre-race ceremonies with an invocation. Vocalist Catrina Mack from Orlando, Florida performed the national anthem.

The majority of the two-vehicle draft tandems observed at the 2011 Daytona races and greatly disliked by fans appeared to be absent; vehicles could not stay connected together for long periods of time until the engine in the following car overheated.

=== Race 1 ===
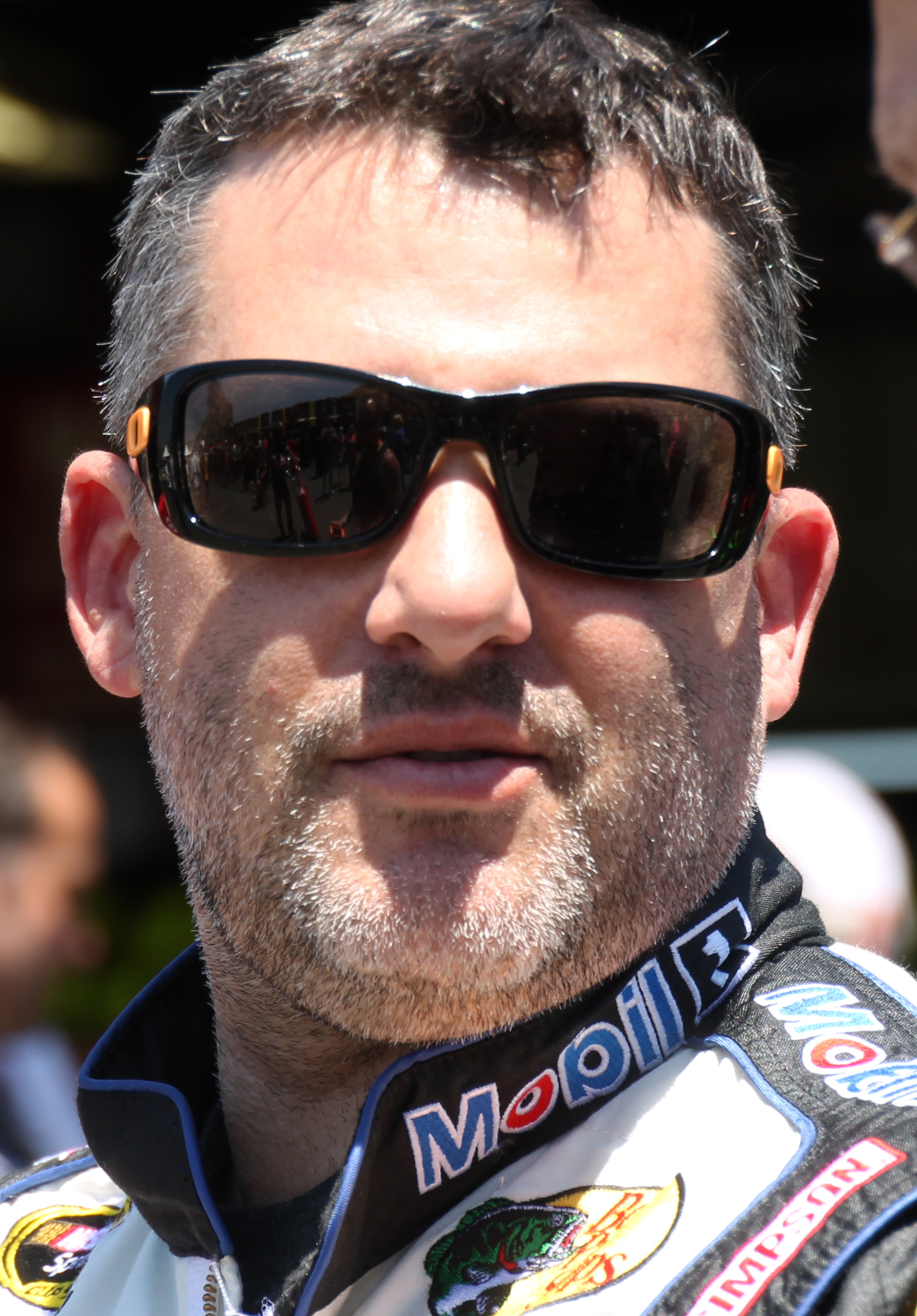
Tony Stewart (pictured in 2015) was the winner of the first Gatorade Duel.

Following the invocation and performance of the National Anthem, three-time Olympic gold medalist swimmer Ryan Lochte commanded the drivers to begin their engines. Edwards maintained the lead into turn one with Earnhardt in second. Tony Stewart took the lead on lap two by passing Edwards on the outside. Edwards, with help from Bayne, passed Stewart into turn three to recover first place two laps later. Earnhardt took the lead on the fifth lap, while Ambrose took second. Earnhardt retook the lead after Edwards briefly had it back. Bayne, who was also battling for the lead, had fallen back by lap seven. McDowell collided with David Gilliland's left-rear quarter panel between turns one and two on lap nine; Gilliland went up the track towards the outside wall and collected Menard and Montoya, triggering the race's first caution and bringing out the pace car. Keselowski's car was also entangled in the wreckage and incurred minor damage. Gilliland, Menard, and Montoya retired their cars in the garage with substantial damage. Most of the drivers, including Earnhardt, made pit stops for fuel. Earnhardt had to make another pit stop after a pit crew member went over the wall too soon, sending him down the race order.

Ambrose led Denny Hamlin (both of whom chose not to pit), Almirola, Stewart, and Jamie McMurray when the race resumed on lap 14. One lap later, Hamlin passed Ambrose for the lead. Burton helped Stewart take the lead from Hamlin one lap later. Hamlin retook the lead on lap 17, while McDowell moved into second. Hamlin maintained his advantage for the next four laps while McMurray battled Stewart for second. McDowell had dropped to eighth place by lap 21, while Stewart continued in second by lap 25. McMurray was unable to complete a pass on the outside of Hamlin for the lead at turn three on the 28th lap, dropping him to eighth two laps later. Crew chiefs asked their drivers to conserve fuel as early as halfway through the race. On lap 32, the top five were Hamlin, Stewart, Harvick, Stenhouse and Ambrose. As the cars ran in single file, Edwards had dropped to 15th place one lap later. McDowell was told by his team to save fuel on lap 43.

Green flag pit stops began on lap 44 when Hamlin and Ambrose stopped for tyres and fuel, promoting Stewart to the lead with Harvick in second and Stenhouse in third. Waltrip lost control of his car on the backstraightaway after driving off the side of the track onto the high banking on the race circuit, and crashed into the backstretch wall eight laps later after leaving pit road and returning to racing speed. The incident prompted the second caution, as all drivers save Stewart, Harvick, and Edwards stopped for fuel. This allowed drivers who were not drafting the race leader and teams that were conserving fuel to finish the race to return to contention. Stewart, Harvick and Edwards led at the lap 57 restart. Two laps later, Earnhardt and Edwards temporarily moved to first and second places but Stewart retook the lead on the same lap.

McMurray drove down from the top lane after exiting turn two and collided with Almirola in the middle lane, causing Almirola to collide with Danica Patrick on the inside lane while on the backstraightaway, sending her spinning into the inside SAFER wall, which she struck with the right-hand side of her car, causing significant damage. The impact broke up much of the car's front-end, and she removed her hands from the steering wheel to avoid fracturing her wrists and thumbs from the sudden impact to the steering column. The crash resulted in the race's third and final caution. Patrick was unharmed and was able to walk to an ambulance, which transported her to the in-field medical center. She was evaluated and released from the medical center. Bayne's splitter sustained minor damage when he drove over a spring from Patrick's car. The field was frozen in place, with the order of finish determined by where the drivers were when the caution began. This gave Stewart the win, his third Daytona 500 qualifier win in five years. Earnhardt finished second, and Ambrose, Burton and Edwards completed the top five finishers. McDowell and Robby Gordon earned the two transfers to enter the Daytona 500. The first race saw three cautions and eight lead changes amongst five different drivers. Hamlin led the most laps of any racer with 27. Stewart took the lead three times for a total of 21 laps.

=== Race 2 ===
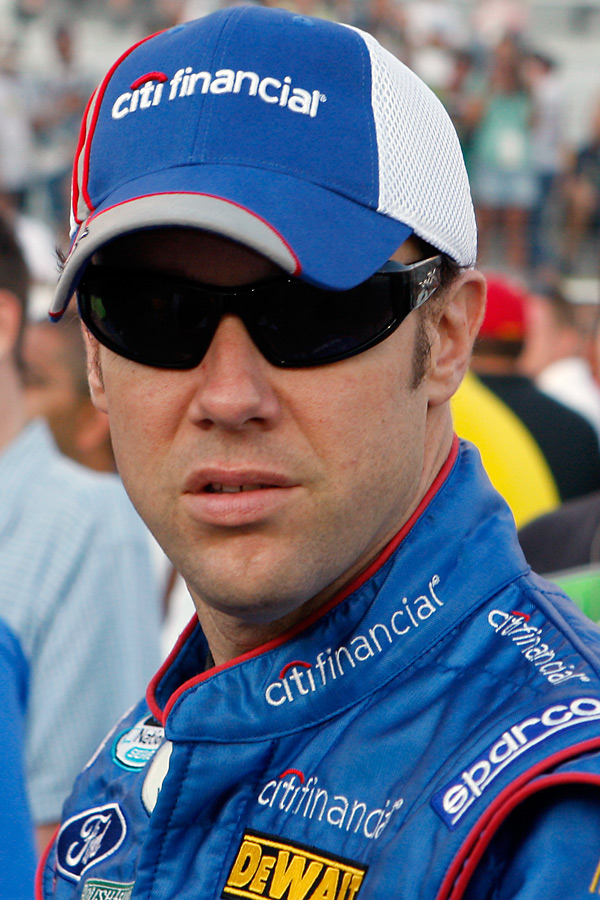
Matt Kenseth (pictured in 2009) was the winner of the second Gatorade Duel.

Following the first Gatorade Duel, the Lead Category Manager at supermarket chain Harris Teeter, Steve Kravitz, commanded the drivers to start their engines. The weather was similar to that in the first Duel, albeit with a higher air temperature of 84 °F (29 °C). During the pace laps, Kahne had to move to the rear of the order because he had switched to his backup car. He was joined by Clint Bowyer—whose qualifying time was disallowed because his car twice failed the post-race inspection for height sticks, and Bill Elliott—who had switched his car's engine. Biffle maintained the lead going into the first turn, followed by Casey Mears. On lap three, Kenseth moved to the outside line to prepare for a race-leading overtake and was assisted by Johnson. Kenseth took the lead on the next lap with Johnson second, and Biffle dropping to third. By the twelfth lap, the top ten drivers were separated by one second, with Joey Logano and Kyle Busch moving to the front two spots by lap 14. Elliott Sadler nearly lost control of his car between turns one and two on lap 16 but was able to continue. Kenseth attempted to pass Kyle Busch on the outside of turn four on lap 17 but was stopped by Busch.

Kyle Busch moved into the lead on lap 18, while Logano lost positions. Blaney had advanced nine positions from 14th to fifth on lap 21; Logano had advanced to third by the same lap. On lap 23, Biffle took the lead. Kenseth, who was drafting off teammate Biffle, experienced overheating issues and dropped to ninth place. Biffle and Kyle Busch began battling for the lead on lap 26 through the fourth turn, and the duo switched positions for the next two laps. Biffle took the lead on the 29th lap. Regan Smith and Sadler had moved into third and fourth place on lap 33. Biffle reported debris in turn two, but officials were unable to locate it. Green flag pit stops began on lap 40; Kenseth, Logano, and Kyle Busch stopped on lap 42, followed by Biffle, Smith, and Jimmie Johnson on the following lap.

After the pit stops, Biffle retook the lead, Smith moved into second, and Johnson was in third. Sadler and Kenseth followed the top three drivers. Kyle Busch was drafting off Logano on lap 46 but developed engine troubles, allowing Logano to pull away. By the 50th lap, Biffle, Smith, Johnson, Sadler, and Kenseth were the top five. Kenseth had fallen to 13th but recovered to fifth after his crew chief Jimmy Fennig put him on a fuel-only pit stop. Johnson went up the track on lap 52 but regained control of his car. Six laps later, after the leaders ran single file, Johnson helped Kenseth on the outside line in preparation for a race-winning slingshot. Kenseth passed teammate Biffle on the inside of the tri-oval shortly after they began the final lap; Biffle had ignored his crew chief Matt Puccia's order to stay on the yellow line and shield the bottom of the circuit, instead veering to the outside to try to block oncoming traffic, losing momentum. Smith passed Johnson for second on the backstraightaway after both cars collided.

Kenseth maintained the lead and crossed the finish line on lap 60 to win the race. Smith finished in second and Johnson third. Sadler and Biffle completed the top five finishers. Blaney and Nemechek earned the second pair of transfer spots for the Daytona 500. Bayne, Raines, and Stremme qualified for the race based on their qualifying speed, while Terry Labonte qualified using a champion's provisional. Six drivers failed to qualify for the Daytona 500: Waltrip, Richardson, Bill Elliott, Mike Wallace, Kenny Wallace, and Yeley. They did not finish high enough in their respective Duels or set a fast enough qualifying lap. The second race saw five lead changes between four different drivers, with no cautions issues. Biffle led the most laps of any racer, at 40. Kenseth took the lead twice for a total of ten laps.

== Post-race comments ==
After the first race, Stewart drove to the victory lane; the win earned him $55,725. He said, "The fact that we've won 17 times here and not won on the right day is proof it's good momentum, but it's no guarantee obviously. It's nice to come here, especially for Steve and I, being our first race together, to be able to come out and have two really good strong and solid races back-to-back is an awesome start for us." Earnhardt felt the race was "pretty good" and congratulated Stewart on his victory. He also said that he intended to begin the Daytona 500 not in a backup car. Ambrose was happy with his finishing third, "We learned a lot for Sunday, we got a good result. We are smiling right now but it was very close to being the other way around." He also said he was hoping to carry his good form into the Daytona 500.

Waltrip, who failed to qualify for the Daytona 500 after crashing on lap 52, said he felt he had let everyone down, adding, "It's just really hard. I don't know what to say. It's just sad." Truex commented on his team owner Waltrip's non-qualification, "It's a tough one for him, He's been coming here a long time and this race means everything to him. It was hard to watch that." Patrick, who was hit by Almirola on the final lap and crashed heavily into the wall, said, "It sucks [to hit the wall like that]. You just have to brace yourself. I guess in these situations, I just have to be glad that I'm a small driver and that I've got room. Kinda hug it in and let it rip." She also said the crash was "a blessing in a big disguise". Patrick, along with Gilliland, Montoya and Menard, were required to drive their backup cars for the Daytona 500. After the wreck on lap nine, Gilliland cut his thumb on his helmet; the thumb required one stitch but he was confident about driving his backup car. According to Menard, who was involved in the lap nine wreck, "Somebody turned (David) Gilliland; I saw him get sideways underneath me. I was three lanes up and I tried to clear him and didn't quite make it." It took 56 minutes and 34 seconds to complete the first race; because it ended under caution, no margin of victory was recorded.

After winning the second race, Kenseth drove to the victory lane; earning $56,726 for the victory. Kenseth's victory awarded him and his team Roush Fenway Racing their first Gatorade Duels victory. Kenseth said, "Jimmie Johnson gave me a huge push there and really worked nice for me the whole race. Without that push it never would've got there. Greg lost his drafting partner. We were able to separate him and the #78 [Regan Smith] and we had such a big run that Greg was kind of a sitting duck." Second-place finisher Smith stated while he would have preferred to win the race, he had no complaints, "It's good to know that we have a car capable of running up front." Johnson, who finished third, said, "It was an awesome race. We really had a shot to win that one. It was unfortunate there at the end that there were some lapped cars that were kind of mixed in with the leaders. It would have been nice if they would have let us race there; at least from the white flag on." Biffle admitted that he should have remained on the inside line. It took 46 minutes and 23 seconds to complete the second race, and the margin of victory was 0.209 seconds.

After the races, there was continued discussion about overheating engines in high temperatures. Harvick said the temperatures of around 80 °F (27 °C) had affected the racing, the grills were "too tight" and competitors chose to remain in a single-file formation because of overheating. Smith said he believed there was no efficient method of tackling the problem. McMurray advocated the widening of the grille, saying, "it was a little hard to race because you got too hot". One day after the second race, NASCAR announced that no further changes would be made. Menard criticized the style of driving that was observed during both races, saying, "NASCAR is trying to dictate physics. Physics says two cars are going to push and they're trying to make rule changes to keep us from doing it, so it's kind of hybrid pack racing and tandem racing. It's causing a pretty unsafe situation." Robby Gordon was critical of Terry Labonte receiving a champion's provisional, saying, "When you look at it, besides pure speed, I think three guys make it on speed and, obviously, Terry takes a past champion. I disagree with that." He conceded, "But it is what it is. It's the rules. Like I said, we don't make the rules, we just play by them, and sometimes you can't manipulate them."

=== Race results 1 and 2 ===
Race 1							Race 2						
Pos	Grid	Car	Driver	Team	Manufacturer	Laps	Pos	Grid	Car	Driver	Team	Manufacturer	Laps
1	6	14	Tony Stewart	Stewart–Haas Racing	Chevrolet	60	1	7	17	Matt Kenseth	Roush Fenway Racing	Ford	60
2	2	88	Dale Earnhardt Jr.	Hendrick Motorsports	Chevrolet	60	2	18	78	Regan Smith	Furniture Row Racing	Chevrolet	60
3	3	9	Marcos Ambrose	Richard Petty Motorsports	Ford	60	3	6	48	Jimmie Johnson	Hendrick Motorsports	Chevrolet	60
4	13	31	Jeff Burton	Richard Childress Racing	Chevrolet	60	4	16	33	Elliott Sadler	Richard Childress Racing	Chevrolet	60
5	1	99	Carl Edwards	Roush Fenway Racing	Ford	60	5	1	16	Greg Biffle	Roush Fenway Racing	Ford	60
6	21	98	Michael McDowell	Phil Parsons Racing	Ford	60^{1}	6	9	20	Joey Logano	Joe Gibbs Racing	Toyota	60
7	12	29	Kevin Harvick	Richard Childress Racing	Chevrolet	60	7	12	18	Kyle Busch	Joe Gibbs Racing	Toyota	60
8	10	22	A. J. Allmendinger	Penske Racing	Dodge	60	8	3	24	Jeff Gordon	Hendrick Motorsports	Chevrolet	60
9	25	7	Robby Gordon	Robby Gordon Motorsports	Dodge	60^{1}	9	8	39	Ryan Newman	Stewart–Haas Racing	Chevrolet	60
10	16	1	Jamie McMurray	Earnhardt Ganassi Racing	Chevrolet	60	10	22	5	Kasey Kahne	Hendrick Motorsports	Chevrolet	60
11	4	6	Ricky Stenhouse Jr.	Roush Fenway Racing	Ford	60	11	5	55	Mark Martin	Michael Waltrip Racing	Toyota	60
12	5	21	Trevor Bayne	Wood Brothers Racing	Ford	60^{2}	12	14	36	Dave Blaney	Tommy Baldwin Racing	Chevrolet	60^{1}
13	11	2	Brad Keselowski	Penske Racing	Dodge	60	13	4	56	Martin Truex Jr.	Michael Waltrip Racing	Toyota	60
14	9	34	David Ragan	Front Row Motorsports	Ford	60	14	15	51	Kurt Busch	Phoenix Racing	Chevrolet	59
15	7	43	Aric Almirola	Richard Petty Motorsports	Ford	60	15	24	15	Clint Bowyer	Michael Waltrip Racing	Dodge	59
16	17	10	Danica Patrick	Tommy Baldwin Racing	Chevrolet	59	16	19	47	Bobby Labonte	JTG Daugherty Racing	Toyota	59
17	20	11	Denny Hamlin	Joe Gibbs Racing	Toyota	59	17	17	87	Joe Nemechek	NEMCO Motorsports	Toyota	59^{1}
18	19	40	Michael Waltrip	Hillman Racing	Toyota	52^{3}	18	2	13	Casey Mears	Germain Racing	Ford	59
19	15	30	David Stremme	Inception Motorsports	Toyota	28^{2}	19	22	23	Robert Richardson Jr.	R3 Motorsports	Toyota	59^{3}
20	24	37	Mike Wallace	Rick Ware Racing	Toyota	24^{3}	20	20	97	Bill Elliott	NEMCO Motorsports	Toyota	58^{3}
21	18	32	Terry Labonte	FAS Lane Racing	Ford	13^{2}	21	13	09	Kenny Wallace	RAB Racing	Toyota	57^{3}
22	23	38	David Gilliland	Front Row Motorsports	Ford	8	22	11	26	Tony Raines	Front Row Motorsports	Ford	9^{2}
23	14	42	Juan Pablo Montoya	Earnhardt Ganassi Racing	Chevrolet	8	23	21	93	David Reutimann	BK Racing	Toyota	6
24	8	27	Paul Menard	Richard Childress Racing	Chevrolet	8	24	23	49	J. J. Yeley	Robinson-Blakeney Racing	Toyota	4^{3}
25	22	83	Landon Cassill	BK Racing	Toyota	3							
^{1} Qualified for the Daytona 500 by transfer spot.
^{2} Qualified for the Daytona 500 by speed or champion's provisional.
^{3} Did not qualify for the Daytona 500.
