= Doug Yates =

NASCAR team owner

- Born: Robert Douglas Yates; September 18, 1967 (age 58); Charlotte, North Carolina, U.S.
- Education: North Carolina State University
- Occupations: Engine builder, mechanic

Robert Douglas Yates (born September 18, 1967) is an American race car engine builder, former NASCAR team owner, and mechanic. He is the son of championship team owner and NASCAR Hall of Fame member Robert Yates and formerly operated Yates Racing in the NASCAR Cup Series. Yates currently is the president and CEO of Roush Yates Engines, the primary builder of Ford engines in the top-two NASCAR series (NASCAR Xfinity Series and NASCAR Cup Series); as well as Ford Performance teams in the IMSA Michelin Pilot Challenge Series. Yates has a wife, Whitney, and four children.

== Biography ==
=== Early career ===
Yates was born and raised in Charlotte, North Carolina, the hub for NASCAR. He graduated from North Carolina State University in 1990 with a degree in mechanical engineering and in 2015 was inducted into the NC State MAE (Mechanical and Aerospace Engineering) Hall of Fame. Yates worked in his father's race shop, Robert Yates Racing, in between semesters, then joined the organization full time in 1990 as the team's engine builder. Yates built engines for drivers Davey Allison, Ernie Irvan, Dale Jarrett, among others. Yates engines won at various tracks including Daytona International Speedway and Indianapolis Motor Speedway and won the 1999 NASCAR Winston Cup Series Championship with driver Dale Jarrett. In total, Yates won 56 races and three championships with Robert Yates Racing.

=== Roush Yates Engines established ===
In 2003, with the support from Ford, Robert and Doug Yates merged their engine departments with their rival Jack Roush of Roush Racing (now Roush Fenway Keselowski Racing) to form what is now Roush Yates Engines, with Doug Yates becoming CEO and President. Roush Yates Engines is the exclusive Ford engine builder for NASCAR and builds over 900 engines annually in their 75,000 square-foot facility in Mooresville, North Carolina. Doug's father, Robert, retired from racing at the end of 2007, allowing Doug the opportunity to become the team owner of Yates Racing. Yates fielded a car for drivers David Gilliland, Travis Kvapil, Paul Menard and Bobby Labonte. Yates started Roush Yates Performance Parts in 2008, an outlet for new and used engine and chassis parts. In 2009, Yates Racing merged with Richard Petty Motorsports and Doug shifted his attention solely to Roush Yates Engines. He purchased his father's half of Roush Yates Engines in 2009 and became co-owner of the company with Jack Roush. Since the start of the 2004 season, Roush Yates Engines has achieved over 380 combined overall wins (points and non-points) and 27 Championship titles in the NASCAR, IMSA (International Motor Sports Association) and FIA (Federation Internationale De LÁutomobile) series. Yates has won a total of six Mahle Engine Builder of the Year awards and in 2016 was recognized by Professional Motorsport World as one of the Top 10 Engine Builders of the Decade. Yates described the process of building the loud and powerful engines as "somewhat relaxing" in a 2012 interview.

=== Roush Yates Manufacturing Solutions ===
In 2008, Yates founded a new division of Roush Yates Engines, Roush Yates Manufacturing Solutions (RYMS). RYMS is a CNC advanced machining facility, which manufactures high-performance engine components to support engine design, development and production. In 2018, RYMS expanded their operations into an 88,000 square-foot facility in Mooresville, North Carolina. Although rooted in motorsports and automotive industries, RYMS has breached out to CNC machining and manufacturing components for the aerospace, defense, medical and industrial industries. Roush Yates Manufacturing Solutions' Quality Management System is certified to AS9100 Rev D/ ISO 9001 standard as well as DUNS 620934716, CAGE Code 855Z8, ITAR Registered M38212, SAM Registered, DCMA Registered, Exostar Registered, Ariba Registered, JSF Registered, JCP Certified, EIN 20–0596690, NIST 800-171 Rev A, Primary NAICS 332710, Federal Small Business category and a certified DOD Contractor.
