= Stewart–Haas Racing =

Former NASCAR team

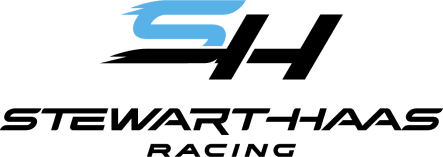
- Owner(s): Tony Stewart; Gene Haas
- Base: Kannapolis, North Carolina
- Series: NASCAR Cup Series; NASCAR Xfinity Series
- Manufacturer: Chevrolet (2009–2016); Ford (2017–2024)
- Opened: 2009
- Closed: 2024

Career
- Debut: Cup Series: 2009 Daytona 500 (Daytona); Xfinity Series: 2017 PowerShares QQQ 300 (Daytona); Camping World Truck Series: 2014 Kroger 250 (Martinsville); ARCA Menards Series: 2021 Clean Harbors 100 at The Glen (Watkins Glen); ARCA Menards Series West: 2018 Carneros 200 (Sonoma)
- Latest race: Cup Series: 2024 NASCAR Cup Series Championship Race (Phoenix); Xfinity Series: 2024 NASCAR Xfinity Series Championship Race (Phoenix); Camping World Truck Series: 2014 Lucas Oil 150 (Phoenix); ARCA Menards Series: 2021 Clean Harbors 100 at The Glen (Watkins Glen); ARCA Menards Series West: 2023 General Tire 200 (Sonoma)
- Races competed: Total: 784; Cup Series: 508; Xfinity Series: 263; Camping World Truck Series: 9 ARCA Menards Series: 1 ARCA Menards Series West: 3
- Drivers' Championships: Total: 3 Cup Series: 2; 2011, 2014; Xfinity Series: 1; 2023
- Race victories: Total: 102; Cup Series: 70; Xfinity Series: 29 (Note: 18 for Stewart–Haas Racing, and 11 for Stewart–Haas Racing with Biagi-DenBeste.); Camping World Truck Series: 1 (Note: As Haas Racing Development.); ARCA Menards Series West: 2
- Pole positions: Total: 79; Cup Series: 54; Xfinity Series: 22; Camping World Truck Series: 2 ARCA Menards Series West: 1

Stewart–Haas Racing (SHR) was an American professional stock car racing team that competed in both the NASCAR Cup Series and the NASCAR Xfinity Series. The team was co-owned by three-time NASCAR Cup Series champion Tony Stewart and Gene Haas, founder of Haas Automation. The team was established in 2009 after Stewart left Joe Gibbs Racing and entered a partnership with Haas, acquiring a 50% stake in the team and merging with the former Haas CNC Racing team. Stewart–Haas Racing permanently shut down at the conclusion of the 2024 NASCAR Cup Series season.

The team was based and headquartered in Kannapolis, North Carolina – roughly 10 miles (16 km) north of Charlotte Motor Speedway – alongside sister team and Formula One entrant Haas F1 Team.

From its inception until 2016, the team ran with Chevrolet engines and chassis provided by Hendrick Motorsports. Beginning in 2017 the team began partnering with Roush-Yates Engines and switched to Ford engines, while building their chassis in-house.

The team has won in each of the three national touring divisions, joining Hendrick Motorsports, Richard Childress Racing, Joe Gibbs Racing, and RFK Racing as the only teams to accomplish that feat.

On May 28, 2024, it was announced that the team would shut down at the end of the 2024 season. On June 20, Gene Haas announced he will keep one of the team's four charters and restructure the team as Haas Factory Team in 2025.

== History ==
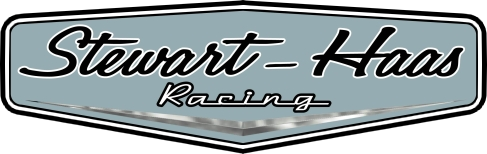
Logo of Stewart–Haas Racing from 2011 to 2023.

On July 10, 2008, it was announced that then-two-time Sprint Cup Series champion Tony Stewart would join the team as a driver and owner for the 2009 season, receiving a 50% stake in the team. Stewart had been driving for Joe Gibbs Racing, but wanted to own a racing team of his own, though it has been speculated that JGR's switch from Chevrolet to Toyota also played a possible role. Haas, meanwhile, desired to have Stewart drive for the team, and for Stewart to attract sponsors and personnel. The team was merged from Haas CNC Racing and renamed into Stewart–Haas Racing. The team proceeded to sign several high-level sponsors and experienced personnel, while better utilizing its alliance with Hendrick Motorsports.

After fielding General Motors cars since the team was founded, on February 24, 2016, it was announced that the team would switch to Ford for the 2017 season, receiving engines from Roush-Yates Engines. The team also restarted its program in the now-O’Reilly Auto Parts Series.

On August 2, 2022, Stewart–Haas Racing announced that effective September 1, President Brett Frood would step down to become commissioner of the National Lacrosse League. He will remain as an executive advisor to SHR and board chairman for Tony Stewart's entities. In addition, vice president of sales Brian McKinley would be promoted to chief commercial officer while Greg Zipadelli would transition from vice president of competition to chief competition officer and Joe Custer will remain as co-president.

On May 28, 2024, Stewart announced that Stewart–Haas Racing would shut down its Cup and Xfinity Series teams after the 2024 season, resulting in 323 job losses. One charter was sold to Front Row Motorsports for $20–25 million to be used for the No. 4 car driven by Noah Gragson, the second charter was then sold to 23XI Racing for its No. 35 car driven by Riley Herbst, and the third charter was sold to Trackhouse Racing for its No. 88 car driven by Shane van Gisbergen. On June 20, Gene Haas confirmed he would retain one charter and reorganize the team as Haas Factory Team, with Joe Custer as president. The new team will also keep SHR's two Xfinity Series entries.

== Cup Series ==
=== Car No. 4 history ===
Ryan Newman (2009–2013)

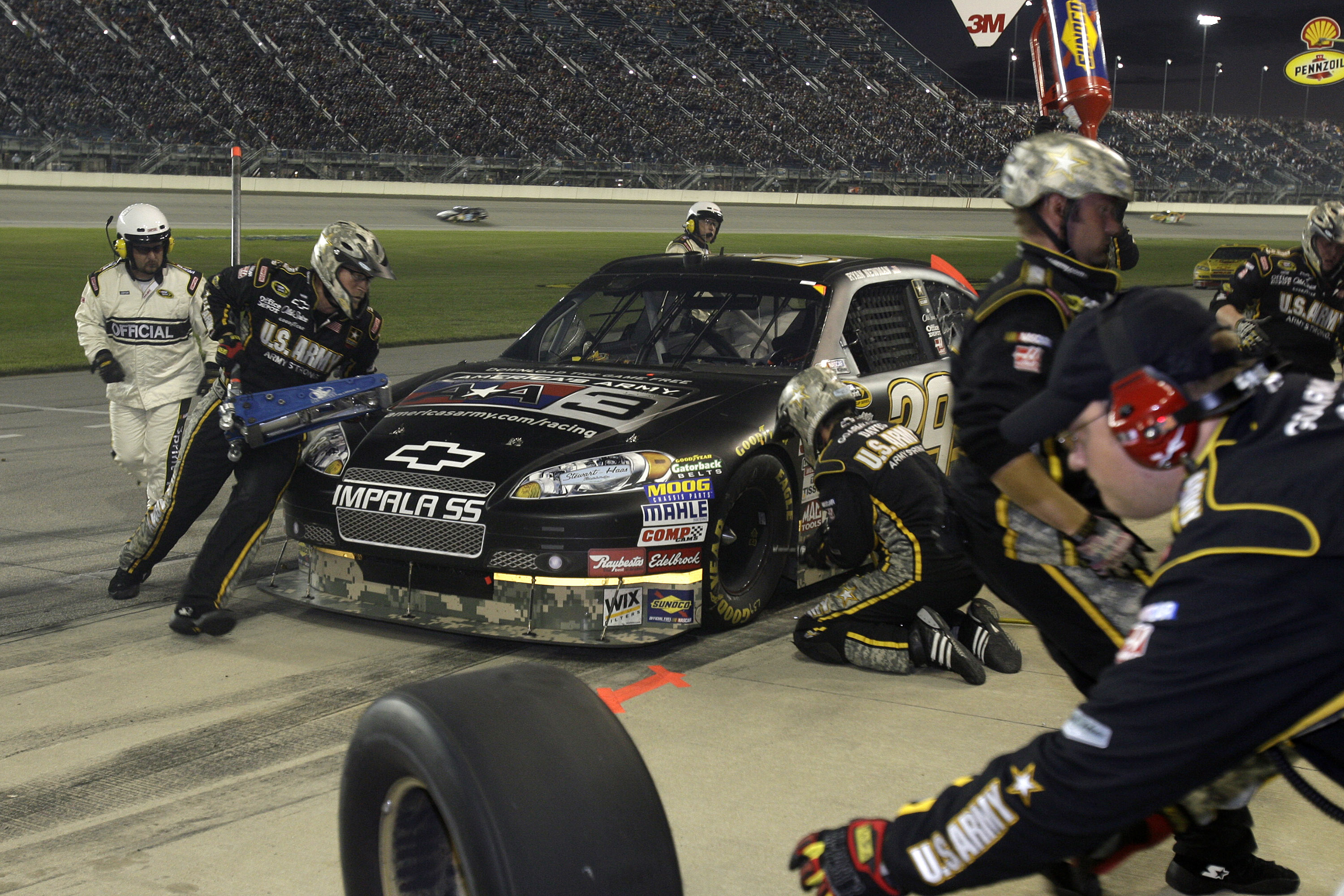
Ryan Newman pits his No. 39 Impala at the 2009 LifeLock.com 400

The No. 4 car originated as the No. 39 car. In the 2009 season, Newman led the first 25 laps at Bristol and finished seventh. He finished sixth the next week at Martinsville after recovering from a pit road mistake. After finishing in the top twenty the next two weeks, Newman had his breakout race leading at Talladega, nearly scoring Stewart–Haas Racing's first win. With two laps left, he was passed by Carl Edwards and Brad Keselowski. Newman finished third after Keselowski sent Edwards airborne and crashing on his windshield and hood. The next week, Newman led 45 laps at Richmond and finished fourth. He made the Chase for the Sprint Cup but failed to win a race in 2009. The team did, however, score 15 top 10 finishes and managed to finish ninth in points.

The U.S. Army returned to Newman's car for the 2010 season as sponsor for 15 races and with new sponsorship from Tornados. The team won their first race in the No. 39 at Phoenix. The win was also the first in NASCAR history for a car numbered 39. The team failed to make the Chase, though, and finished 15th in points. In 2011, Newman scored a second win at New Hampshire while Stewart finished second making it the first 1-2 for SHR. Newman and Stewart made the Chase, and Newman came home 10th in the final standings. For the 2012 season, Quicken Loans sponsored the No. 39 car. Newman got off to a quick start in 2012 with a win at Martinsville in only the 6th race. However, his momentum flagged over the summer and he missed the Chase, finishing the season in 14th place.

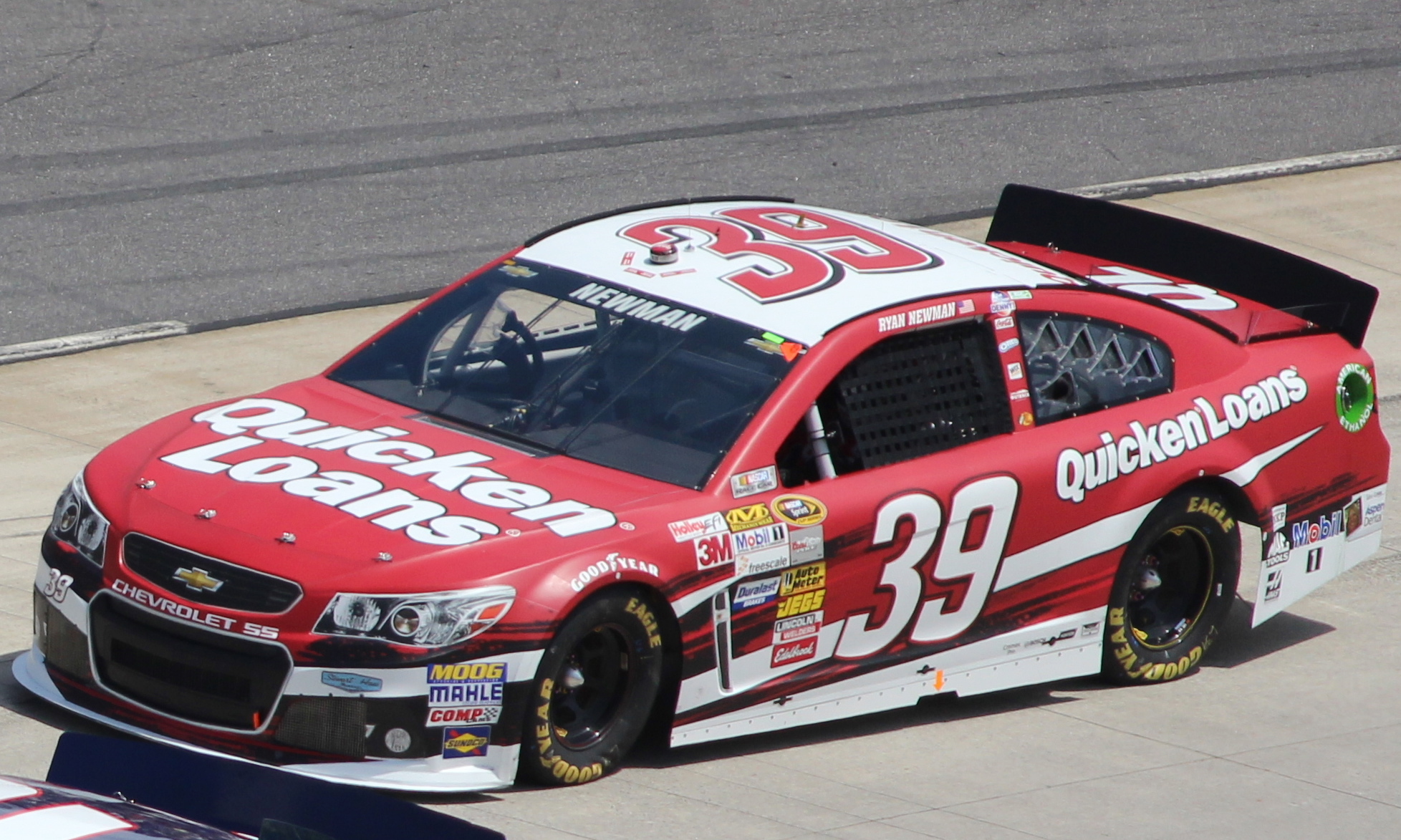
Ryan Newman competing in the 2013 STP Gas Booster 500 at Martinsville Speedway

In 2013, Quicken Loans became Newman's primary sponsor as the U.S. Army significantly reduced its motorsports sponsorships. Newman would struggle through the first half of the season adjusting to the Generation 6 car. Through the second half of the season, SHR's performance would pick up, and Newman would take his first win of the season at the 2013 Brickyard 400, winning the pole and driving away from a dominant Jimmie Johnson. He would become the second Indiana native alongside Stewart to win the 400. Newman originally failed to make the 2013 Chase, but after Michael Waltrip Racing was penalized for "manipulating the results of the Federated Auto Parts 400", Newman took Martin Truex Jr.'s place in the Chase. After 2013, Newman was released after it was announced funding could not be found to keep his No. 39 team in operation (though the team would later sign Kurt Busch to a fourth ride).

Kevin Harvick (2014–2023)

For 2014, Kevin Harvick was signed to the newly renumbered No. 4 Chevrolet SS, with his Budweiser and Jimmy John's sponsorship coming over from Richard Childress Racing. Hunt Brothers Pizza, which had sponsored the team in the past, also came over with Harvick. Harvick won in just his second start with SHR at the spring Phoenix race. The team then won again at Darlington in April, leading 239 of 374 laps and using fresher tires to pass Dale Earnhardt Jr. with two laps to go. Harvick's two wins with the team earned him a spot in the Chase for the Sprint Cup. He advanced into the second round with two top-fives and won at Charlotte in October to earn a spot in the third round. Harvick finished the season strong, winning the penultimate race of the year at the fall Phoenix race to remain in title contention, then winning the final race of the year at Homestead to clinch the second Cup Championship for SHR.

Harvick had a strong run during the 2015 season with 28 top-10s and wins at Las Vegas, Phoenix, and Dover, but lost the championship to Kyle Busch by just one point. In 2016, Anheuser-Busch switched from Budweiser to Busch Beer as the No. 4's sponsor brand. Harvick's run in 2016 was not as successful as his first two years with SHR, finishing eighth in the points standings with 27 top-10s and wins at Phoenix, Bristol, New Hampshire, and Kansas.

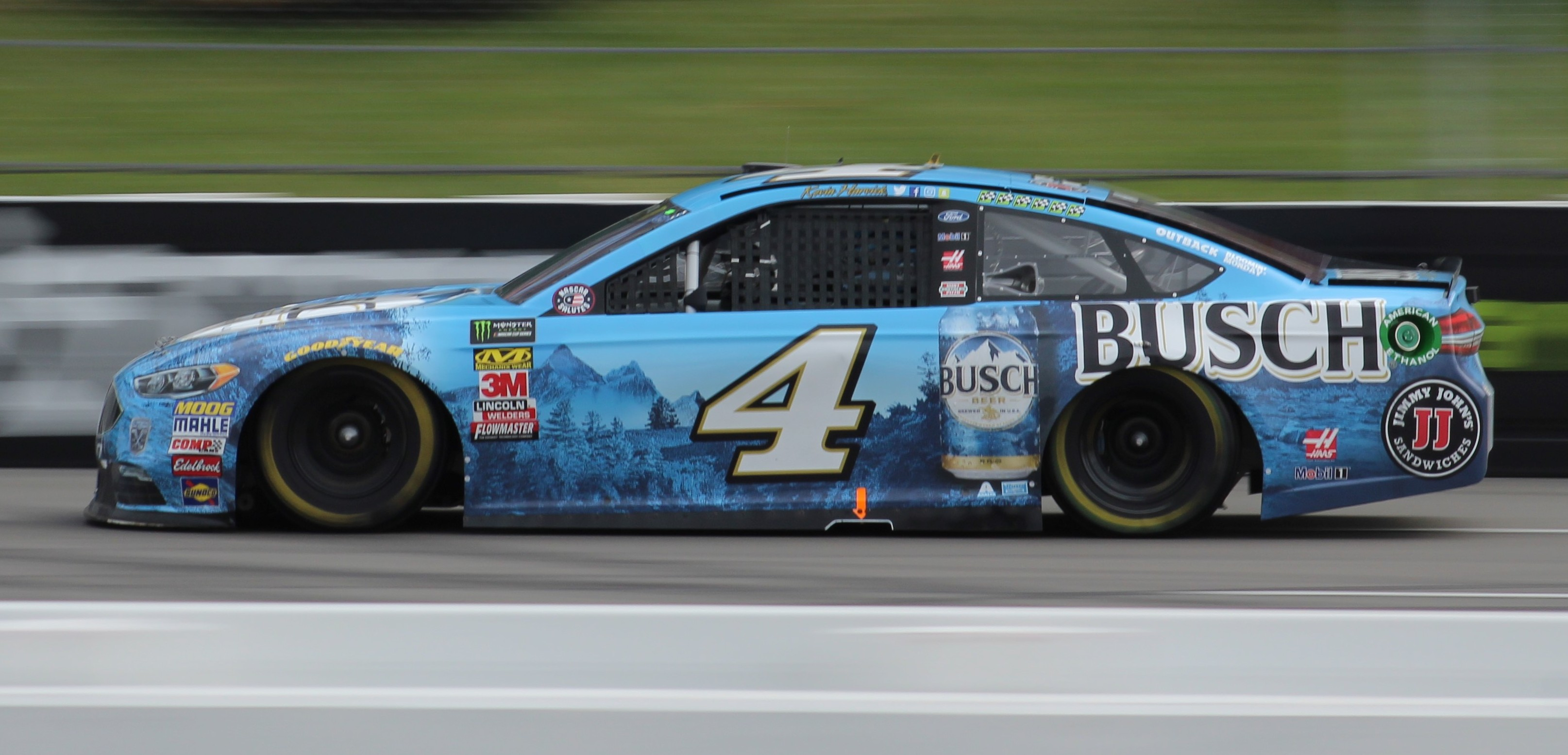
Kevin Harvick in the No. 4 at Pocono Raceway in 2018.

With SHR transitioning from Chevrolet to Ford in 2017, Harvick rebounded heavily with wins at Sonoma and Texas, along with 23 top-10s, and a third-place finish in the points standings. Harvick's 2018 run fared much better, with a career-high eight wins, 20 top-fives, and 26 top-10s, despite his Las Vegas win being encumbered for a post-race inspection violation. With a win at the fall Texas race, he secured himself in the Final Four at Homestead. However, three days later, the win was declared encumbered after the car was discovered to have a non-compliant rear spoiler during post-race inspection. The violation resulted in an L1 penalty that docked the team 40 owner and driver points - voiding Harvick's eligibility in the Final Four - and placed Childers and car chief Robert Smith on suspension for the final two races. Tony Gibson became Harvick's crew chief for the remainder of the season. At Phoenix, Harvick overcame a flat tire during the race to finish fifth and secure enough points to make the Championship 4. He finished third at Homestead and in the points standings.

Harvick's 2019 season started with a win at the Gander RV Duel 1 at Daytona. Despite a 26th-place finish at the 2019 Daytona 500, he stayed consistent with six straight top-10 finishes, including three fourth-place finishes at Atlanta, Las Vegas, and California. At Bristol, Harvick was forced to start at the back of the field and serve a pass-through penalty on the first lap after his car failed pre-race inspection three times; despite this setback, he finished 13th place on the lead lap. Harvick would finally get his first win and the organization's first win of 2019 at New Hampshire. He would also win at Michigan and Indianapolis, the latter being his second career Brickyard 400 win. He once again sealed his spot in the Championship 4 after holding off SHR teammates Aric Almirola and Daniel Suárez for his third straight victory at the fall Texas race, his fifth Championship 4 appearance in the last six years.

Harvick started the 2020 season with a fourth-place finish in Duel 2 of the 2020 Bluegreen Vacations Duels at Daytona. Despite sustaining minor damage, he finished fifth at the 2020 Daytona 500, his first top-five in the race since 2016. He stayed consistently in the top 10 at Las Vegas, Fontana, and Phoenix before the season was halted due to the COVID-19 pandemic. When racing resumed on May 17, Harvick scored his 50th career win at 2020 The Real Heroes 400 at Darlington. Following the second Drydene 311 at Dover International Speedway, Harvick clinched the Regular Season Championship. Despite this achievement, as well as nine wins in the season, he failed to make the Championship 4 after finishing 17th at Martinsville. Harvick finished fifth in the points standings.

Despite scoring no wins in 2021, Harvick managed to make the playoffs with his consistency. During the playoffs, Harvick made it to the Round of 12 with five consecutive top-10 finishes, yet he had the disadvantage of lacking the bonus playoff points. At Bristol, he tangled with Chase Elliott, costing the latter several laps after cutting a tire. Harvick led the closing laps, but was blocked by Elliott, allowing Kyle Larson to overtake him for the win. A heated argument between Harvick and Elliott ensued on pit road after the race. During the Charlotte Roval race, Harvick bumped Elliott and sent him to the wall with rear-end damage. Harvick later missed turn 1 with Elliott chasing him down and crashed head-on into the wall. As a result, he was eliminated from the Round of 8. Harvick once again finished fifth in the final standings.

Harvick began the 2022 season with a 30th-place finish at the 2022 Daytona 500. Aside from four DNFs, he stayed consistent with his finishes until he won at Michigan, breaking a 65-race drought to become the 15th different winner in the season. Harvick then scored his 60th career victory at Richmond a week later. At the Southern 500, Harvick finished 33rd after his car caught fire. He was eliminated in the Round of 16 after finishing 10th at the Bristol night race. On October 5, Childers was suspended for four races and fined US$100,000 for an L2 Penalty during post-race inspection after the Talladega playoff race. The penalty came under Sections 14.1 (vehicle assembly) and 14.5 (body) in the NASCAR Rule Book, both of which pertain to the body and overall vehicle assembly rules surrounding modification of a single-source supplied part. In addition, the No. 4 team was docked 100 driver and owner points.

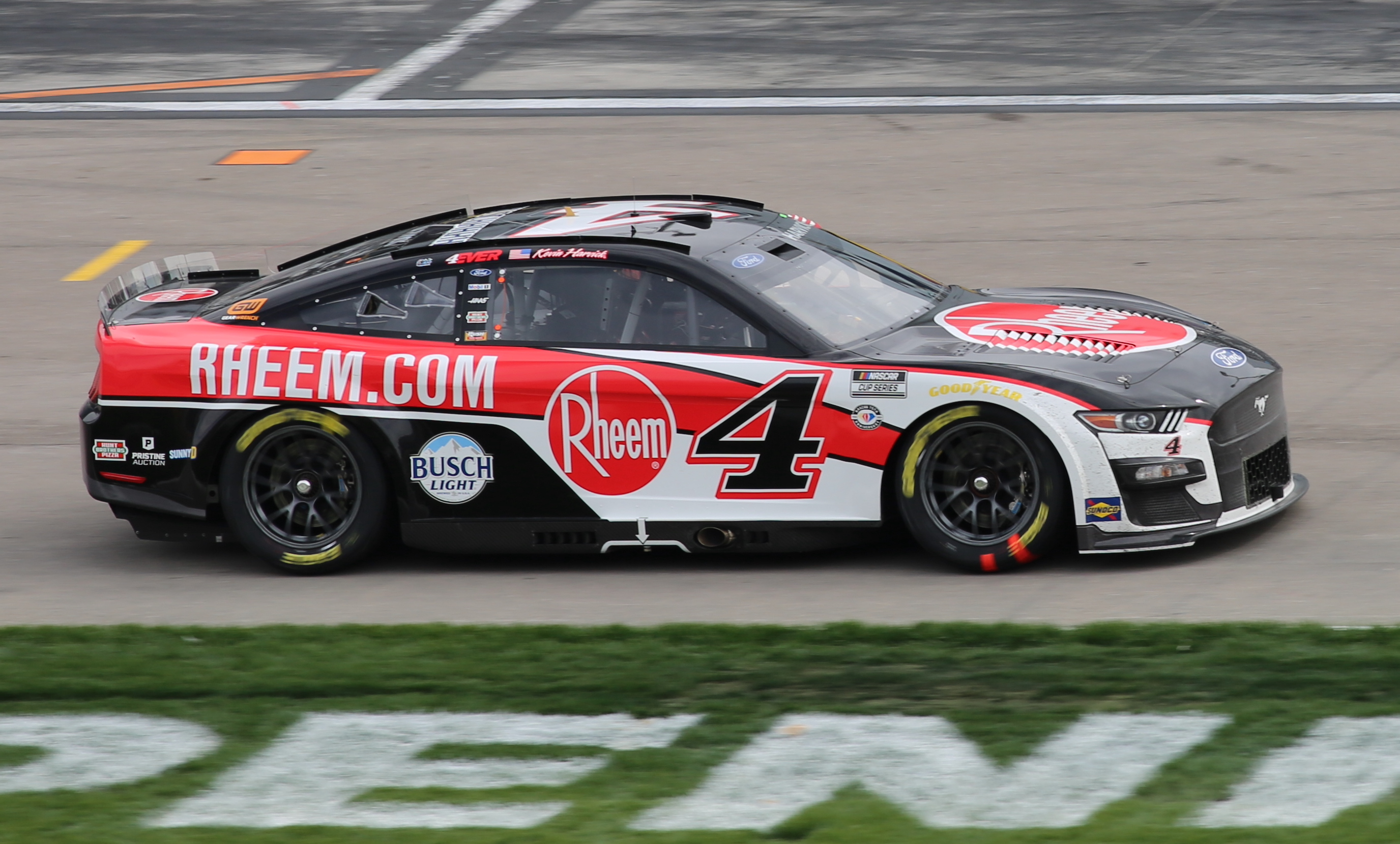
Kevin Harvick in the No. 4 at Las Vegas Motor Speedway in 2023

On January 12, 2023, Harvick announced he will retire at the end of the 2023 season. He started the season with a 12th-place finish at the 2023 Daytona 500. For his final appearance at the NASCAR All-Star Race, Harvick's car will use the No. 29 and a throwback paint scheme honoring his first career win at Atlanta in 2001. On July 11, Anheuser-Busch announced it signed a multi-year sponsorship deal with the Trackhouse Racing No. 1 of Ross Chastain starting in 2024, ending its nine-year partnership with the No. 4 at the end of the season. Despite not winning a race, Harvick stayed consistent enough to make the playoffs on his final season. He was eliminated at the conclusion of the Round of 16. At Talladega, Harvick finished second to Ryan Blaney, but was later disqualified after post-race inspection discovered a violation involving the car's windshield fasteners. Harvick finished his Cup Series career with a seventh-place finish at Phoenix and 13th in the points standings.

Josh Berry (2024)

On June 21, 2023, SHR signed Xfinity Series driver Josh Berry as Harvick's replacement in the No. 4 in 2024. Berry started the season with a 25th place finish at the 2024 Daytona 500. He scored a season-best third-place finish at Darlington and New Hampshire.

==== Car No. 4 results ====
Year	Driver	No.	Make	1	2	3	4	5	6	7	8	9	10	11	12	13	14	15	16	17	18	19	20	21	22	23	24	25	26	27	28	29	30	31	32	33	34	35	36	Owners	Pts
2009	Ryan Newman	39	Chevy	DAY; 36	CAL; 28	LVS; 25	ATL; 22	BRI; 7	MAR; 6	TEX; 15	PHO; 16	TAL; 3	RCH; 4	DAR; 4	CLT; 2	DOV; 8	POC; 5	MCH; 23	SON; 17	NHA; 29	DAY; 20	CHI; 6	IND; 14	POC; 14	GLN; 21	MCH; 15	BRI; 6	ATL; 9	RCH; 10	NHA; 7	DOV; 10	KAN; 22	CAL; 15	CLT; 11	MAR; 7	TAL; 36	TEX; 12	PHO; 20	HOM; 23	9th	6175
2010	Ryan Newman	39	Chevy	DAY; 34	CAL; 36	LVS; 18	ATL; 17	BRI; 16	MAR; 4	PHO; 1	TEX; 11	TAL; 35	RCH; 8	DAR; 9	DOV; 13	CLT; 9	POC; 14	MCH; 32	SON; 16	NHA; 6	DAY; 26	CHI; 22	IND; 17	POC; 12	GLN; 12	MCH; 23	BRI; 6	ATL; 8	RCH; 11	NHA; 8	DOV; 8	KAN; 9	CAL; 5	CLT; 36	MAR; 30	TAL; 23	TEX; 20	PHO; 2	HOM; 7	15th	4302
2011	Ryan Newman	39	Chevy	DAY; 22*	PHO; 5	LVS; 5	BRI; 10	CAL; 5	MAR; 20	TEX; 14	TAL; 25	RCH; 20	DAR; 5	DOV; 21	CLT; 31	KAN; 15	POC; 9	MCH; 6	SON; 25	DAY; 23	KEN; 4	NHA; 1*	IND; 12	POC; 5	GLN; 16	MCH; 5	BRI; 8	ATL; 20	RCH; 8	CHI; 8	NHA; 25	DOV; 23	KAN; 18	CLT; 10	TAL; 38	MAR; 10	TEX; 16	PHO; 5	HOM; 12	10th	2284
2012	Ryan Newman	39	Chevy	DAY; 21	PHO; 21	LVS; 4	BRI; 12	CAL; 7	MAR; 1	TEX; 21	KAN; 20	RCH; 15	TAL; 36	DAR; 23	CLT; 14	DOV; 15	POC; 12	MCH; 15	SON; 18	KEN; 34	DAY; 5	NHA; 10	IND; 7	POC; 6	GLN; 11	MCH; 8	BRI; 36	ATL; 35	RCH; 8	CHI; 5	NHA; 10	DOV; 21	TAL; 9	CLT; 20	KAN; 30	MAR; 11	TEX; 12	PHO; 5	HOM; 3	14th	1051
2013	Ryan Newman	39	Chevy	DAY; 5	PHO; 40	LVS; 38	BRI; 7	CAL; 10	MAR; 31	TEX; 10	KAN; 14	RCH; 15	TAL; 32	DAR; 10	CLT; 6	DOV; 36	POC; 5	MCH; 18	SON; 15	KEN; 14	DAY; 10	NHA; 39	IND; 1	POC; 4	GLN; 14	MCH; 13	BRI; 21	ATL; 5	RCH; 3	CHI; 10	NHA; 16	DOV; 6	KAN; 35	CLT; 8	TAL; 9	MAR; 38	TEX; 9	PHO; 10	HOM; 17	11th	2286
2014	Kevin Harvick	4	Chevy	DAY; 13	PHO; 1*	LVS; 41	BRI; 39	CAL; 36	MAR; 7	TEX; 42	DAR; 1*	RCH; 11	TAL; 7	KAN; 2*	CLT; 2	DOV; 17	POC; 14	MCH; 2*	SON; 20	KEN; 7	DAY; 39	NHA; 30	IND; 8	POC; 2	GLN; 7	MCH; 2	BRI; 11	ATL; 19*	RCH; 5	CHI; 5*	NHA; 3*	DOV; 13*	KAN; 12	CLT; 1*	TAL; 9	MAR; 33	TEX; 2	PHO; 1*	HOM; 1	1st	5043
2015	Kevin Harvick	4	Chevy	DAY; 2	ATL; 2*	LVS; 1*	PHO; 1*	CAL; 2	MAR; 8*	TEX; 2	BRI; 38*	RCH; 2	TAL; 8	KAN; 2	CLT; 9	DOV; 2	POC; 2	MCH; 29*	SON; 4	DAY; 4	KEN; 8	NHA; 3	IND; 3*	POC; 42	GLN; 3*	MCH; 2	BRI; 2	DAR; 5	RCH; 14	CHI; 42	NHA; 21*	DOV; 1*	CLT; 2	KAN; 16	TAL; 15	MAR; 8	TEX; 3	PHO; 2*	HOM; 2	2nd	5042
2016	Kevin Harvick	4	Chevy	DAY; 4	ATL; 6*	LVS; 7	PHO; 1*	CAL; 2*	MAR; 17	TEX; 10	BRI; 7	RCH; 5	TAL; 15	KAN; 2	DOV; 15*	CLT; 2	POC; 9	MCH; 5	SON; 6	DAY; 39	KEN; 9*	NHA; 4	IND; 6	POC; 4	GLN; 32	BRI; 1	MCH; 5	DAR; 2*	RCH; 5	CHI; 20	NHA; 1	DOV; 37	CLT; 38	KAN; 1	TAL; 7	MAR; 20	TEX; 6	PHO; 4	HOM; 3	8th	2289
2017	Kevin Harvick	4	Ford	DAY; 22*	ATL; 9*	LVS; 38	PHO; 6	CAL; 13	MAR; 20	TEX; 4	BRI; 3	RCH; 5	TAL; 23	KAN; 3	CLT; 8	DOV; 9	POC; 2	MCH; 14	SON; 1	DAY; 33	KEN; 9	NHA; 5	IND; 6	POC; 2	GLN; 17	MCH; 13	BRI; 8	DAR; 9	RCH; 15	CHI; 3	NHA; 36	DOV; 17	CLT; 3*	TAL; 20	KAN; 8	MAR; 5	TEX; 1	PHO; 5	HOM; 4	3rd	5033
2018	Kevin Harvick	4	Ford	DAY; 31	ATL; 1*	LVS; 1*	PHO; 1	CAL; 35	MAR; 5	TEX; 2	BRI; 7	RCH; 5	TAL; 4	DOV; 1*	KAN; 1	CLT; 40	POC; 4*	MCH; 2*	SON; 2	CHI; 3	DAY; 19	KEN; 5	NHA; 1	POC; 4	GLN; 10	MCH; 1*	BRI; 10	DAR; 4	IND; 4	LVS; 39	RCH; 2	CLT; 9	DOV; 6*	TAL; 28	KAN; 12	MAR; 10	TEX; 1*	PHO; 5	HOM; 3	3rd	5034
2019	Kevin Harvick	4	Ford	DAY; 26	ATL; 4	LVS; 4*	PHO; 9	CAL; 4	MAR; 6	TEX; 8	BRI; 13	RCH; 4	TAL; 38	DOV; 4	KAN; 13*	CLT; 10	POC; 22	MCH; 7	SON; 6	CHI; 14*	DAY; 29	KEN; 22	NHA; 1	POC; 6*	GLN; 7	MCH; 1	BRI; 39	DAR; 4	IND; 1*	LVS; 2	RCH; 7	CLT; 3	DOV; 4	TAL; 17	KAN; 9	MAR; 7	TEX; 1*	PHO; 5	HOM; 4	3rd	5033
2020	Kevin Harvick	4	Ford	DAY; 5	LVS; 8*	CAL; 9	PHO; 2	DAR; 1*	DAR; 3	CLT; 5	CLT; 10*	BRI; 11	ATL; 1*	MAR; 15	HOM; 26	TAL; 10	POC; 1	POC; 2	IND; 1*	KEN; 4	TEX; 5	KAN; 4	NHA; 5	MCH; 1*	MCH; 1*	DAY; 17	DOV; 4	DOV; 1*	DAY; 20	DAR; 1	RCH; 7	BRI; 1*	LVS; 10	TAL; 20	CLT; 11	KAN; 2*	TEX; 16	MAR; 17	PHO; 7	5th	2410
2021	Kevin Harvick	4	Ford	DAY; 4	DAY; 6	HOM; 5	LVS; 20	PHO; 6	ATL; 10	BRI; 15	MAR; 9	RCH; 24	TAL; 4	KAN; 2	DAR; 6	DOV; 6	COA; 37	CLT; 10	SON; 22	NSH; 5	POC; 8	POC; 4	ROA; 27	ATL; 11	NHA; 6*	GLN; 8	IND; 14	MCH; 14	DAY; 15	DAR; 5	RCH; 8	BRI; 2	LVS; 9	TAL; 8*	CLT; 33	TEX; 5	KAN; 3	MAR; 12	PHO; 8	5th	2361
2022	Kevin Harvick	4	Ford	DAY; 30	CAL; 7	LVS; 12	PHO; 6	ATL; 21	COA; 11	RCH; 2	MAR; 14	BRI; 34	TAL; 10	DOV; 9	DAR; 4	KAN; 15	CLT; 3	GTW; 33	SON; 4	NSH; 10	ROA; 10	ATL; 12	NHA; 5	POC; 27	IND; 33	MCH; 1*	RCH; 1	GLN; 12	DAY; 20	DAR; 33	KAN; 36	BRI; 10	TEX; 19	TAL; 29	CLT; 2	LVS; 12	HOM; 8	MAR; 16	PHO; 5	15th	2126
2023	Kevin Harvick	4	Ford	DAY; 12	CAL; 5	LVS; 9	PHO; 5	ATL; 33	COA; 13	RCH; 5	BRD; 9	MAR; 20	TAL; 21	DOV; 19	KAN; 11	DAR; 2	CLT; 11	GTW; 10	SON; 11	NSH; 24	CSC; 29	ATL; 30	NHA; 4	POC; 4	RCH; 10	MCH; 8	IND; 23	GLN; 21	DAY; 9	DAR; 19	KAN; 11	BRI; 29	TEX; 6	TAL; 38	ROV; 19	LVS; 16	HOM; 11	MAR; 16	PHO; 7	13th	2241
2024	Josh Berry	4	Ford	DAY; 25	ATL; 29	LVS; 20	PHO; 26	BRI; 12	COA; 35	RCH; 11	MAR; 25	TEX; 36	TAL; 16	DOV; 14	KAN; 15	DAR; 3	CLT; 10	GTW; 36	SON; 32	IOW; 7	NHA; 3	NSH; 26	CSC; 36	POC; 20	IND; 35	RCH; 14	MCH; 22	DAY; 26	DAR; 31	ATL; 28	GLN; 25	BRI; 29	KAN; 38	TAL; 36	ROV; 22	LVS; 24	HOM; 11	MAR; 16	PHO; 24	27th	579

=== Car No. 10 history ===
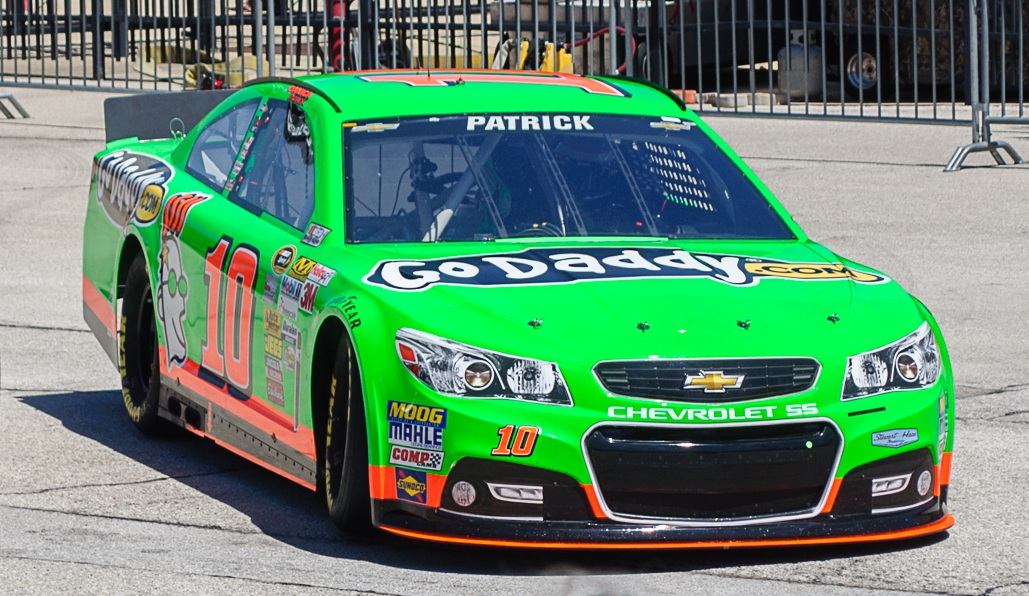
Danica Patrick at Texas in 2013.

Danica Patrick (2012–2017)

The No. 10 was originally the No. 35, the second car of Tommy Baldwin Racing in 2011. In August 2011, it was announced that Danica Patrick would jump to NASCAR competition full-time with sponsor GoDaddy, running a limited Sprint Cup Series schedule of 8-10 races in addition to a full-time Nationwide Series ride with JR Motorsports. Stewart–Haas and TBR formed a partnership, with TBR fielding the number 10 (the number Patrick had used in her karting days) as a second full-time entry. Patrick drove 10 races, with a best finish of 17th at Phoenix in November.

For Patrick's starts, the team used Hendrick engines. Her crew chief in seven of the races was TBR owner Tommy Baldwin Jr., with Greg Zipadelli working one race and Tony Gibson two others. David Reutimann was the primary driver for Baldwin, which utilized ECR Engines and Pro Motor Engines in their starts. The owner points of the No. 10 were retained by Tommy Baldwin Racing for 2013.

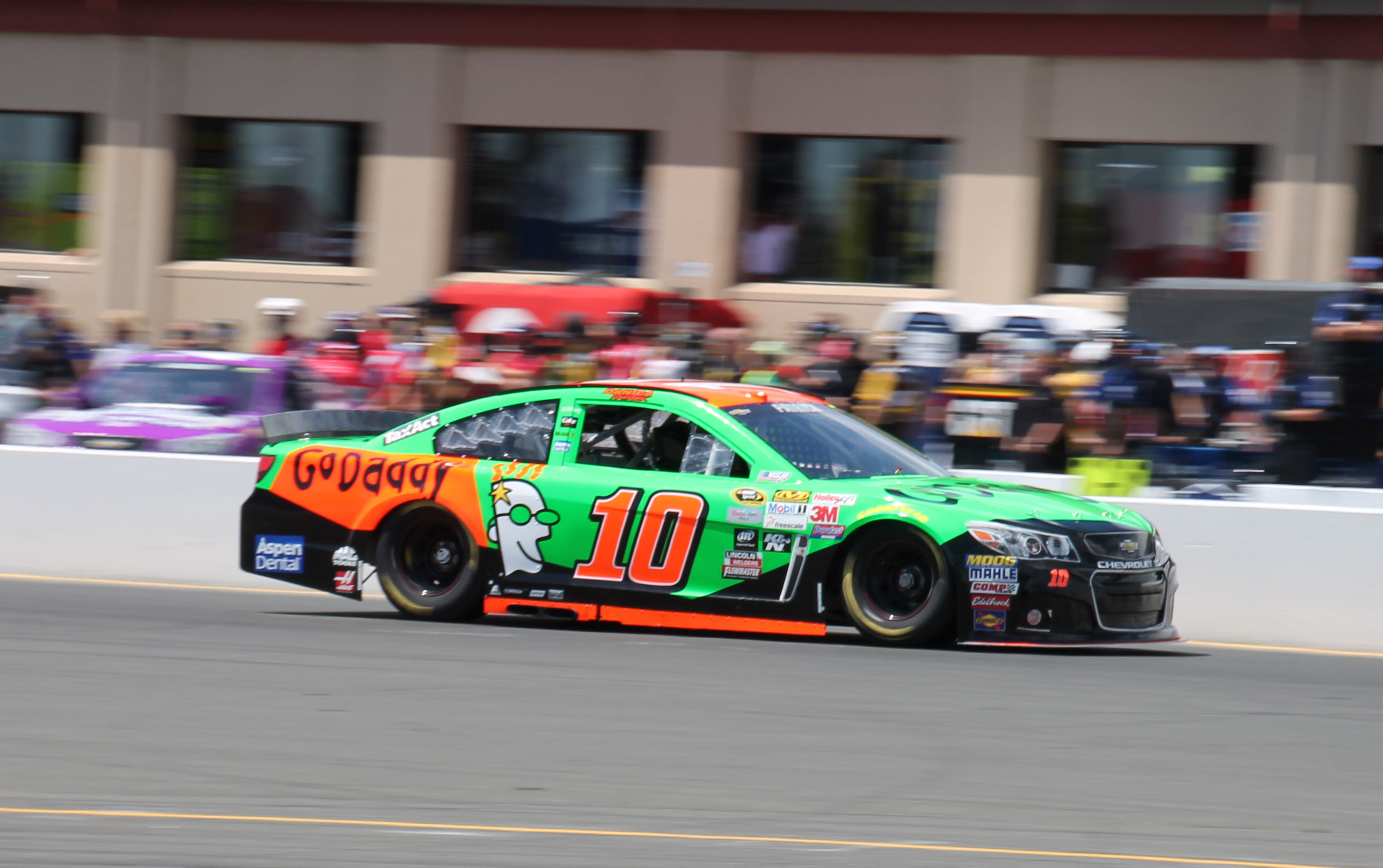
Patrick at Sonoma in 2015, the final year of Go Daddy sponsorship.

Patrick was hired by Stewart–Haas Racing to drive the No. 10 for the full 2013 schedule, making SHR the first team in NASCAR history to sign a female driver to a full Sprint Cup Series season. Danica would be competing with 2-time Nationwide Series Champion, and then-boyfriend, Ricky Stenhouse Jr. and 2011 NASCAR Nationwide Series Rookie of the Year Timmy Hill for the Rookie of the Year award, priming to be the most competitive rookie battle since 2008. Because the No. 10 under SHR was a new entry, the team purchased the 2012 owners points of Robinson-Blakeney Racing to help ensure a starting spot in the first three races of the year. Patrick started the 2013 season winning the pole for the Daytona 500, the first woman to do so, and the first rookie to win the pole since Jimmie Johnson in 2002. Patrick also ran the fastest pole speed for the 500 in 23 years, timing in at 45.817 seconds. She ran in the top 10 for most of the day, became the first woman to lead a lap in the 500, and finished 8th. In addition to her Superspeedway prowess, Patrick posted strong finishes at Martinsville Speedway, finishing 12th in the spring race and 17th in the fall race. At the end of the year, Patrick ranked 27th in points, with only one top 10 and a dismal 30.1 average finish, finishing in front of Hill and ultimately losing out to Stenhouse for ROTY.

Patrick returned for the 2014 season. In addition to GoDaddy.com, Aspen Dental signed on to be the primary sponsor for two races (Las Vegas and Atlanta). She scored her career-best finish: seventh place at Kansas. Months later, she bested that personal record with a sixth-place finish at Atlanta. Patrick finished the 2014 season 28th in points.

Patrick and GoDaddy returned to the No. 10 in 2015. Just like the prior years, Patrick struggled throughout the season, earning two top 10-finishes at Martinsville and Bristol early in the year. Late in the season, GoDaddy announced they would be leaving Stewart–Haas Racing at the end of the season. Aspen Dental came on board for two races during the season. Patrick finished 24th in points.

Patrick returned to the No. 10 in 2016, with new primary sponsorship from Nature's Bakery. Mobil 1 and Aspen Dental also returned to the team. She failed to score a top-10 finish that season and like the previous season, she finished 24th in points.

In January 2017, Nature's Bakery pulled their sponsorship from Patrick, resulting in SHR filing a $31 million lawsuit for breach of contract. Nature's Bakery filed a countersuit, claiming that SHR failed to prevent Patrick from promoting competing products. Both parties agreed to settle the lawsuit in May 2017 and Nature's Bakery agreed to sponsor Patrick and Bowyer for four races. After finishing the 2017 season with one top-10 finish at Dover and finishing 28th in points, Patrick was released from the No. 10 team and replaced by Aric Almirola, who brought in Smithfield Foods as the team's sponsor after six seasons with Richard Petty Motorsports driving the famous No. 43.

Aric Almirola (2018–2023)

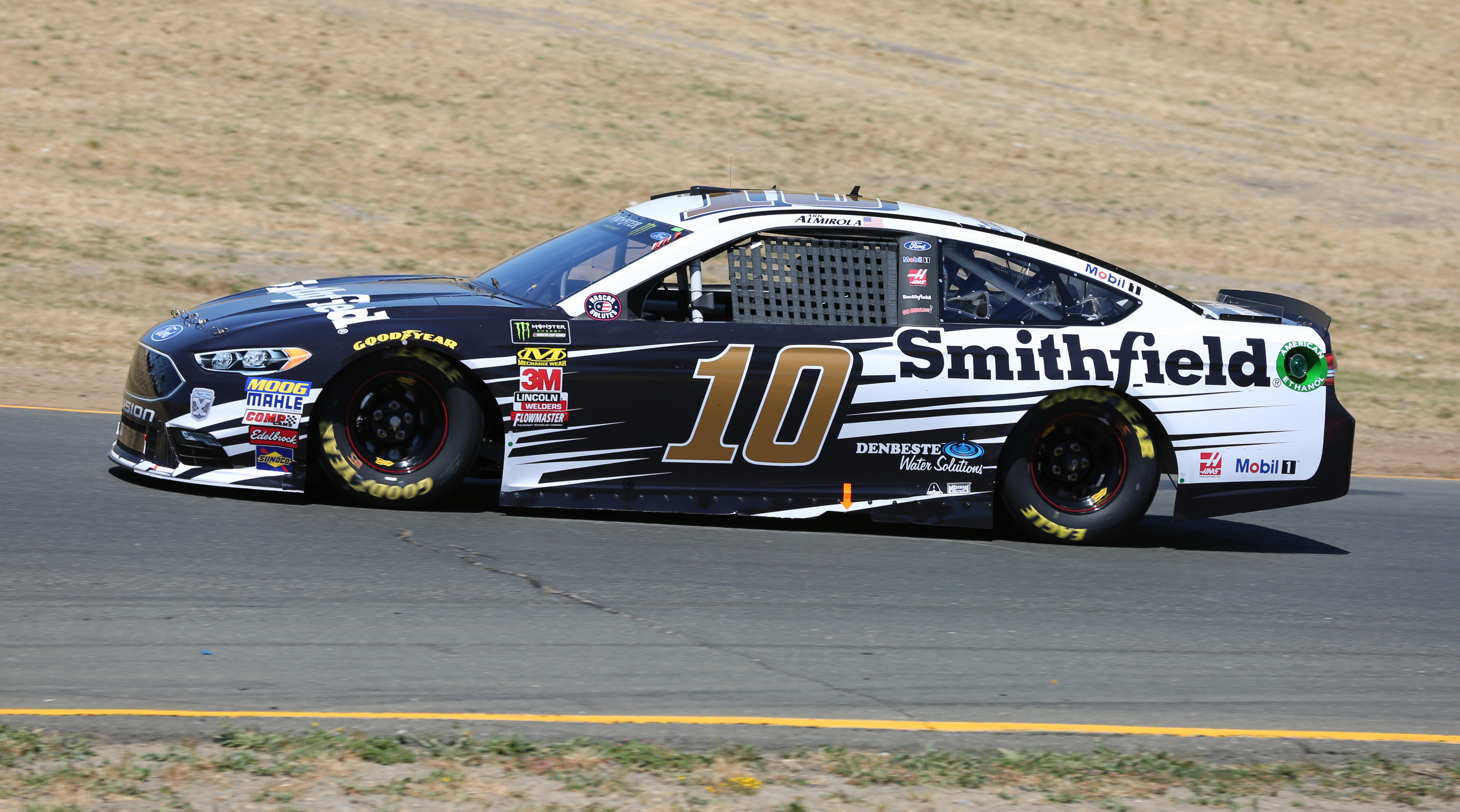
Aric Almirola in the No. 10 at Sonoma Raceway in 2018

The No. 10 team's performance with Almirola in 2018 was a huge improvement over its previous tenure with Patrick, having scored as many top 10 finishes in sixteen races as Patrick's six years. The team also made its first appearance in the Playoffs. Almirola won the 2018 1000Bulbs.com 500 on October 14, giving the No. 10 team its first-ever win. Despite finishing fourth at Phoenix, he was eliminated in the Round of 8. Almirola finished the season fifth in points, the highest in his career.

In the 2019 season, Almirola rebounded from a 32nd-place finish at the 2019 Daytona 500 with six consecutive top-10 finishes before his streak ended with a 37th-place finish at Bristol. He once again made the playoffs but failed to advance past the Round of 16 after recording no top tens. Five weeks later, Almirola contended with teammate and pole-sitter Kevin Harvick for the win at Texas before ending up in second, his best finish of the season. He fell to 14th in the final points standings.

On December 4, 2019, Stewart–Haas Racing announced that Mike Bugarewicz would replace Johnny Klausmeier as the crew chief of the No. 10 team in 2020.

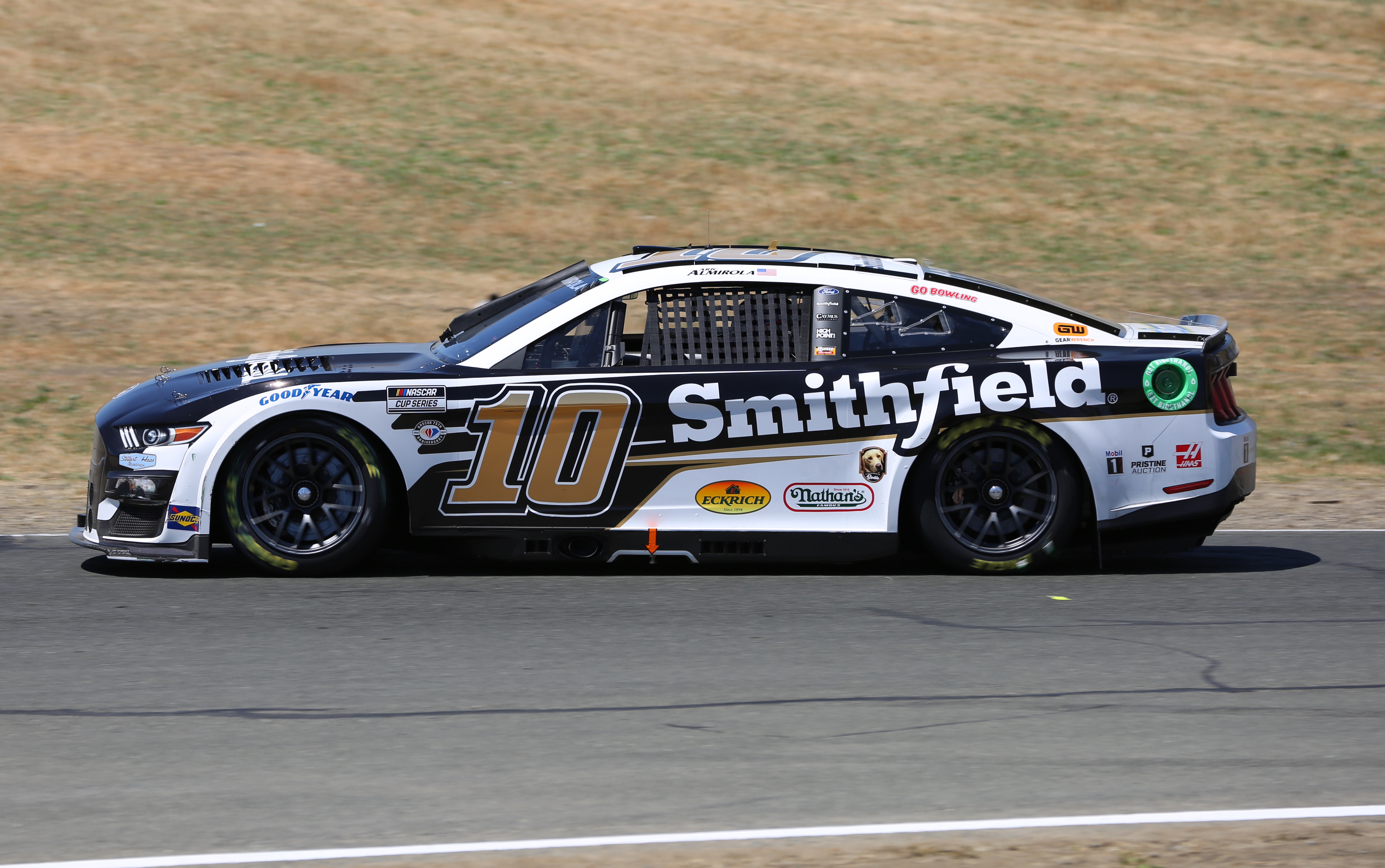
Aric Almirola in the No. 10 at Sonoma Raceway in 2023

On January 10, 2022, Almirola announced his retirement from full-time racing after the 2022 season. He started the season with a fifth-place finish at the 2022 Daytona 500. Despite having no wins, Almirola's finishes were a huge improvement over the previous season, with two top-fives and seven top-10 finishes. On August 19, Almirola announced he would not retire at the end of the season and would continue to drive the No. 10 in 2023.

On October 28, 2023, Almirola announced he would not return to SHR in 2024.

Noah Gragson (2024)

On December 13, 2023, SHR announced that Noah Gragson would take over the 10 car for the 2024 season.

Gragson started the season with a ninth-place finish at the 2024 Daytona 500. Following the Atlanta race, the No. 10 was hit with an L1 penalty and docked 35 owner and driver points after pre-race inspection revealed unapproved roof rails. Gragson rebounded a week later at Las Vegas with a sixth-place finish. He scored a career-best third-place finish at Talladega.

==== Car No. 10 results ====
Year	Driver	No.	Make	1	2	3	4	5	6	7	8	9	10	11	12	13	14	15	16	17	18	19	20	21	22	23	24	25	26	27	28	29	30	31	32	33	34	35	36	Owners	Pts
2012	Danica Patrick	10	Chevy	DAY; 38	PHO	LVS	BRI	CAL	MAR	TEX	KAN	RCH	TAL	DAR; 31	CLT; 30	DOV	POC	MCH	SON	KEN	DAY	NHA	IND	POC	GLN	MCH	BRI; 29	ATL; 29	RCH	CHI; 25	NHA	DOV; 28	TAL	CLT	KAN; 32	MAR	TEX; 24	PHO; 17	HOM	62nd	0^{1}
2013	Danica Patrick	10	Chevy	DAY; 8	PHO; 39	LVS; 33	BRI; 28	CAL; 26	MAR; 12	TEX; 28	KAN; 25	RCH; 29	TAL; 33	DAR; 28	CLT; 29	DOV; 24	POC; 29	MCH; 13	SON; 29	KEN; 23	DAY; 13	NHA; 37	IND; 30	POC; 35	GLN; 20	MCH; 23	BRI; 26	ATL; 21	RCH; 30	CHI; 20	NHA; 27	DOV; 29	KAN; 43	CLT; 20	TAL; 33	MAR; 17	TEX; 25	PHO; 33	HOM; 20	27th	646
2014	Danica Patrick	10	Chevy	DAY; 40	PHO; 36	LVS; 21	BRI; 18	CAL; 14	MAR; 32	TEX; 27	DAR; 22	RCH; 34	TAL; 22	KAN; 7	CLT; 39	DOV; 23	POC; 37	MCH; 17	SON; 18	KEN; 21	DAY; 8	NHA; 22	IND; 42	POC; 30	GLN; 21	MCH; 18	BRI; 27	ATL; 6	RCH; 16	CHI; 19	NHA; 19	DOV; 25	KAN; 16	CLT; 26	TAL; 19	MAR; 34	TEX; 36	PHO; 22	HOM; 18	28th	735
2015	Danica Patrick	10	Chevy	DAY; 21	ATL; 16	LVS; 27	PHO; 26	CAL; 19	MAR; 7	TEX; 16	BRI; 9	RCH; 25	TAL; 21	KAN; 27	CLT; 22	DOV; 15	POC; 37	MCH; 16	SON; 24	DAY; 35	KEN; 34	NHA; 24	IND; 27	POC; 16	GLN; 17	MCH; 25	BRI; 27	DAR; 42	RCH; 19	CHI; 26	NHA; 40	DOV; 21	CLT; 19	KAN; 22	TAL; 27	MAR; 40	TEX; 16	PHO; 16	HOM; 24	24th	716
2016	Danica Patrick	10	Chevy	DAY; 35	ATL; 20	LVS; 21	PHO; 19	CAL; 38	MAR; 16	TEX; 21	BRI; 27	RCH; 24	TAL; 24	KAN; 20	DOV; 13	CLT; 21	POC; 32	MCH; 21	SON; 19	DAY; 27	KEN; 17	NHA; 14	IND; 22	POC; 22	GLN; 21	BRI; 22	MCH; 23	DAR; 24	RCH; 15	CHI; 24	NHA; 18	DOV; 28	CLT; 11	KAN; 18	TAL; 20	MAR; 24	TEX; 24	PHO; 29	HOM; 19	25th	689
2017	Danica Patrick	10	Ford	DAY; 33	ATL; 17	LVS; 36	PHO; 22	CAL; 26	MAR; 23	TEX; 24	BRI; 36	RCH; 18	TAL; 38	KAN; 36	CLT; 25	DOV; 10	POC; 16	MCH; 37	SON; 17	DAY; 25	KEN; 15	NHA; 13	IND; 11	POC; 15	GLN; 22	MCH; 22	BRI; 25	DAR; 26	RCH; 23	CHI; 18	NHA; 18	DOV; 18	CLT; 38	TAL; 21	KAN; 38	MAR; 17	TEX; 17	PHO; 25	HOM; 37	29th	511
2018	Aric Almirola	10	Ford	DAY; 11	ATL; 13	LVS; 10	PHO; 7	CAL; 12	MAR; 14	TEX; 32	BRI; 6	RCH; 17	TAL; 7	DOV; 11	KAN; 9	CLT; 13	POC; 7	MCH; 11	SON; 8	CHI; 25*	DAY; 27	KEN; 8	NHA; 3	POC; 25	GLN; 22	MCH; 7	BRI; 31	DAR; 14	IND; 23	LVS; 6	RCH; 5	CLT; 19	DOV; 13	TAL; 1	KAN; 10	MAR; 11	TEX; 8	PHO; 4	HOM; 9	5th	2354
2019	Aric Almirola	10	Ford	DAY; 32	ATL; 8	LVS; 7	PHO; 4	CAL; 9	MAR; 9	TEX; 7	BRI; 37	RCH; 23	TAL; 9	DOV; 16	KAN; 12	CLT; 11	POC; 10	MCH; 17	SON; 9	CHI; 16	DAY; 7	KEN; 14	NHA; 11	POC; 12	GLN; 12	MCH; 33	BRI; 29	DAR; 17	IND; 14	LVS; 13	RCH; 16	CLT; 14	DOV; 17	TAL; 4	KAN; 23	MAR; 37	TEX; 2	PHO; 22	HOM; 22	14th	2234
2020	Aric Almirola	10	Ford	DAY; 22	LVS; 21	CAL; 8	PHO; 8	DAR; 12	DAR; 7	CLT; 15	CLT; 20	BRI; 29	ATL; 17	MAR; 33	HOM; 5	TAL; 3	POC; 3*	POC; 5	IND; 3	KEN; 8*	TEX; 10	KAN; 6	NHA; 7	MCH; 16	MCH; 6	DAY; 24	DOV; 17	DOV; 7	DAY; 18	DAR; 9	RCH; 8	BRI; 5	LVS; 17	TAL; 37	CLT; 16	KAN; 13	TEX; 23	MAR; 7	PHO; 13	15th	2235
2021	Aric Almirola	10	Ford	DAY; 34	DAY; 17	HOM; 30	LVS; 38	PHO; 11	ATL; 20	BRI; 36	MAR; 20	RCH; 6	TAL; 15	KAN; 29	DAR; 37	DOV; 37	COA; 26	CLT; 22	SON; 27	NSH; 4	POC; 16	POC; 16	ROA; 14	ATL; 23	NHA; 1	GLN; 16	IND; 19	MCH; 17	DAY; 14	DAR; 16	RCH; 14	BRI; 18	LVS; 19	TAL; 26	CLT; 24	TEX; 18	KAN; 26	MAR; 6	PHO; 6	15th	2215
2022	Aric Almirola	10	Ford	DAY; 5	CAL; 6	LVS; 6	PHO; 12	ATL; 22	COA; 19	RCH; 21	MAR; 8	BRI; 23	TAL; 13	DOV; 19	DAR; 11	KAN; 26	CLT; 17	GTW; 5	SON; 14	NSH; 17	ROA; 28	ATL; 8	NHA; 31	POC; 13	IND; 38	MCH; 34	RCH; 8	GLN; 29	DAY; 21	DAR; 11	KAN; 21	BRI; 28	TEX; 24	TAL; 14*	CLT; 15	LVS; 18	HOM; 21	MAR; 15	PHO; 20	20th	760
2023	Aric Almirola	10	Ford	DAY; 21	CAL; 35	LVS; 16	PHO; 33	ATL; 30	COA; 30	RCH; 13	BRD; 31	MAR; 6	TAL; 22	DOV; 24	KAN; 13	DAR; 21	CLT; 25	GTW; 19	SON; 28	NSH; 25	CSC; 12	ATL; 18*	NHA; 34	POC; 12	RCH; 8	MCH; 16	IND; 39	GLN; 30	DAY; 3	DAR; 14	KAN; 17	BRI; 18	TEX; 18	TAL; 17	ROV; 21	LVS; 14	HOM; 9	MAR; 2	PHO; 13	22nd	675
2024	Noah Gragson	10	Ford	DAY; 9	ATL; 36	LVS; 6	PHO; 12	BRI; 34	COA; 34	RCH; 12	MAR; 20	TEX; 18	TAL; 3	DOV; 6	KAN; 9	DAR; 14	CLT; 38	GTW; 22	SON; 26	IOW; 16	NHA; 27	NSH; 10	CSC; 14	POC; 37	IND; 9	RCH; 20	MCH; 12	DAY; 37	DAR; 32	ATL; 34	GLN; 11	BRI; 12	KAN; 18	TAL; 25	ROV; 31	LVS; 18	HOM; 19	MAR; 11	PHO; 12	24th	624

=== Car No. 14 history ===
Tony Stewart (2009–2016)

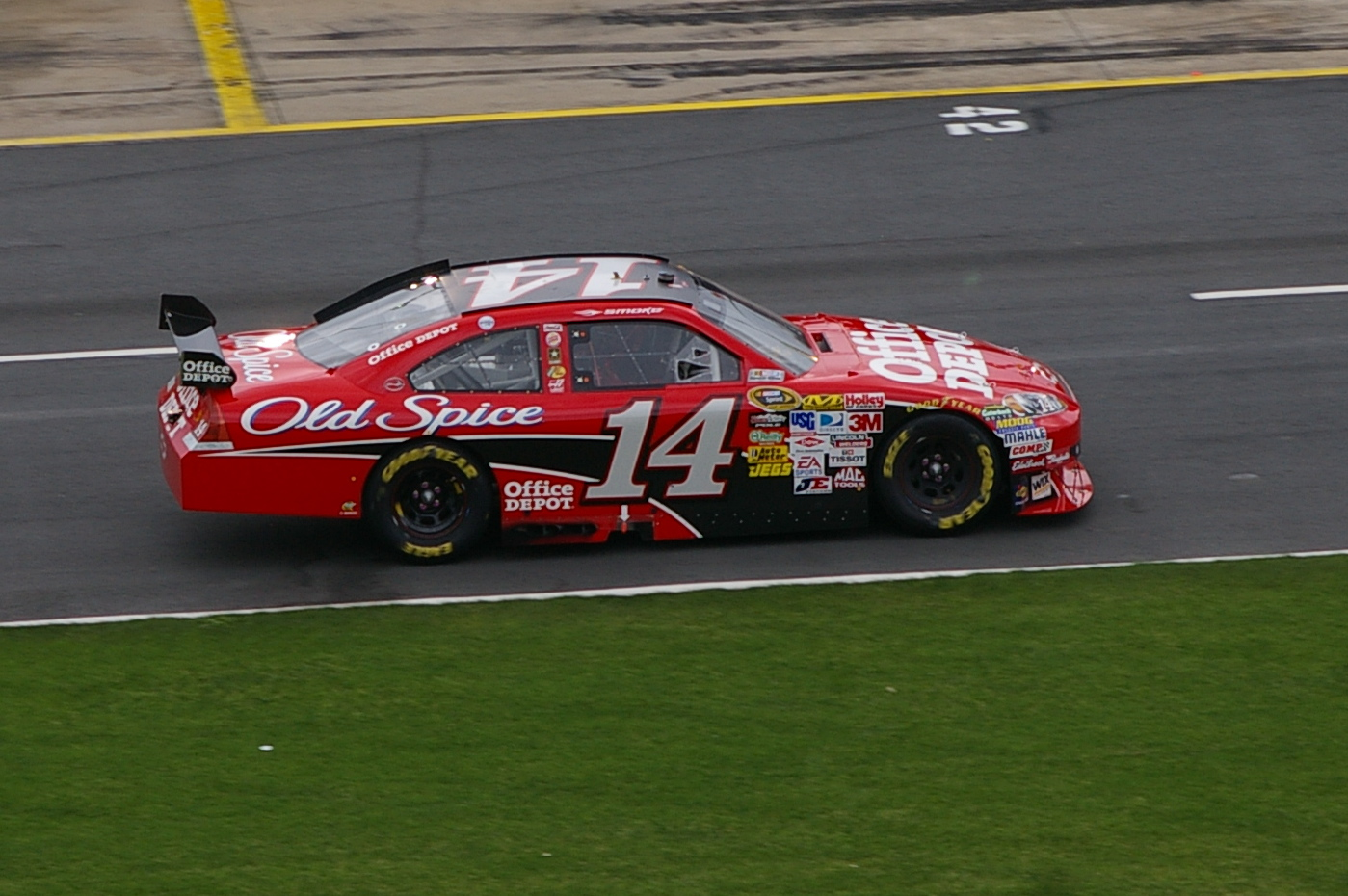
Tony Stewart's No. 14 car during the 2009 Coca-Cola 600

For the 2009 season, the team switched to the No. 14 car, and new co-owner Tony Stewart began driving for the team. Office Depot, moving over from Carl Edwards' No. 99 Ford Fusion, and Old Spice, brought by Stewart, came aboard as primary sponsors, with the number chosen in tribute to Stewart's racing hero, open-wheel legend A. J. Foyt. Even though the No. 70 had finished outside of the Top 35 exemption rule, Stewart had the past championship provisional to utilize for the first five races of 2009 if it was necessary. After five races, the team was solidly in the top ten in owner points. Stewart won the 2009 Sprint All-Star Race, which was the first win for Gene Haas. A few weeks later, Stewart brought the team its first points-paying win at Pocono Raceway in the 2009 Pocono 500. In the 2009 Coke Zero 400 at Daytona, Stewart would win his second race under the Stewart–Haas banner, with Burger King as the sponsor. Stewart continued his winning ways with wins at Watkins Glen and Kansas. He managed a sixth-place finish in points.

Stewart struggled for the early portion of the 2010 season, which prompted Old Spice to leave Stewart–Haas for the 2011 season. Stewart recovered later in the year to win two races at Atlanta and Auto Club Speedway and managed to make the Chase. He finished seventh in points. It was later announced that Mobil 1 would be the replacement sponsor for Old Spice.

Stewart started the 2011 season with a dominant run at Las Vegas but a speeding penalty put the team out of contention late. Stewart was winless entering the Chase. During the 10 race Chase, Stewart won five races at Chicagoland, New Hampshire, Martinsville, Texas, and Homestead to win the team's first Sprint Cup championship, tying Carl Edwards in points, but winning the tiebreaker by most victories (Edwards with one). The title also made Stewart the only NASCAR driver to have won championship titles under the Winston Cup (2002), Nextel Cup (2005), and Sprint Cup (2011) brands.

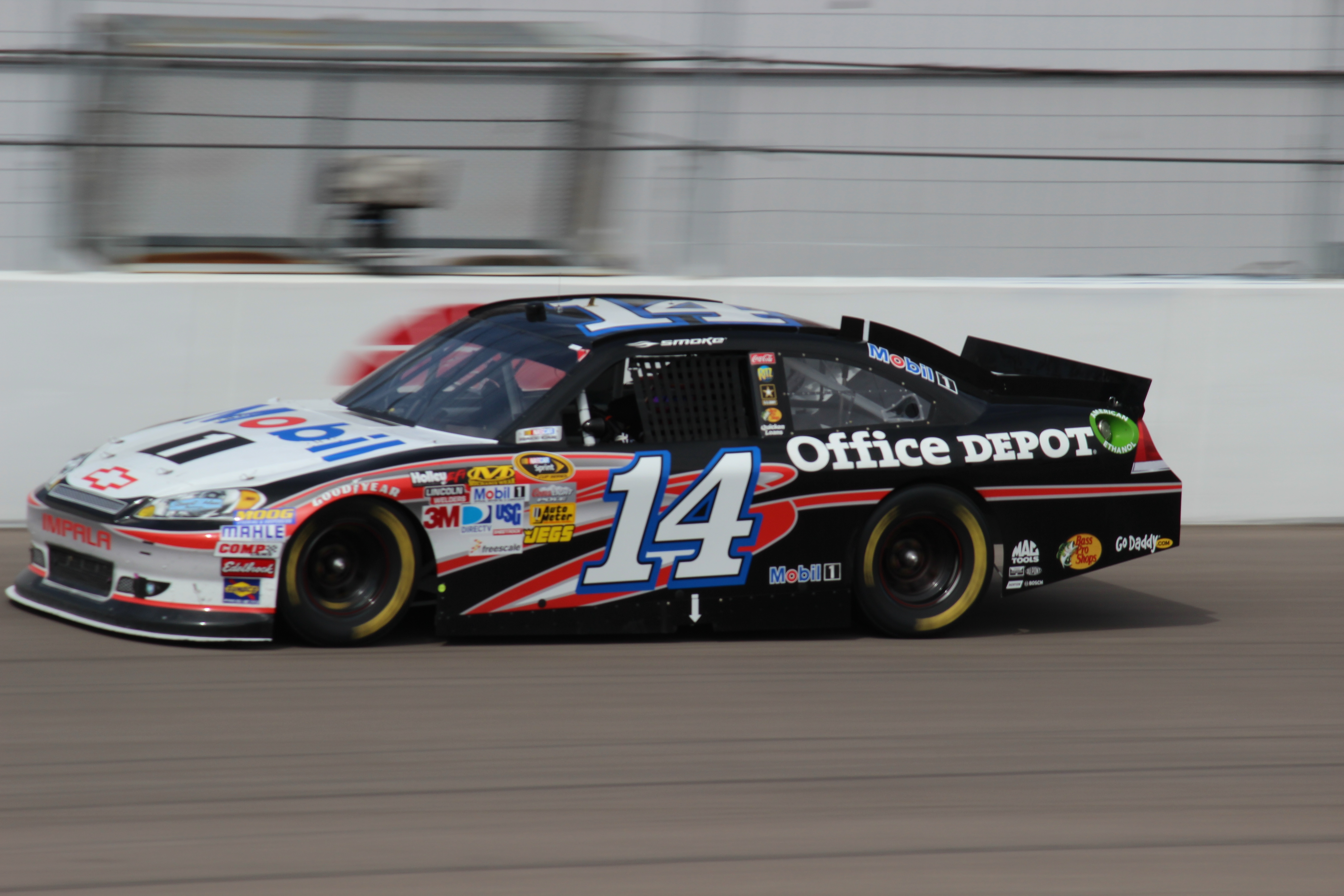
Tony Stewart during the 2012 Kobalt Tools 400

For the 2012 season, both Office Depot and Mobil 1 returned to sponsor Stewart as well as having a minor presence on Ryan Newman's 39 car's right left and right rear quarter panels.

Stewart and his team got off to a quick start in 2012 after finishing second in the non-points Budweiser Shootout, winning the first Gatorade Duel, the Kobalt Tools 400 at Las Vegas, and the rain-shortened Auto Club 400 at Fontana. Later in the season, he won the Coke Zero 400 at Daytona. Stewart would end up finishing 9th in the points standings at the end of the season.

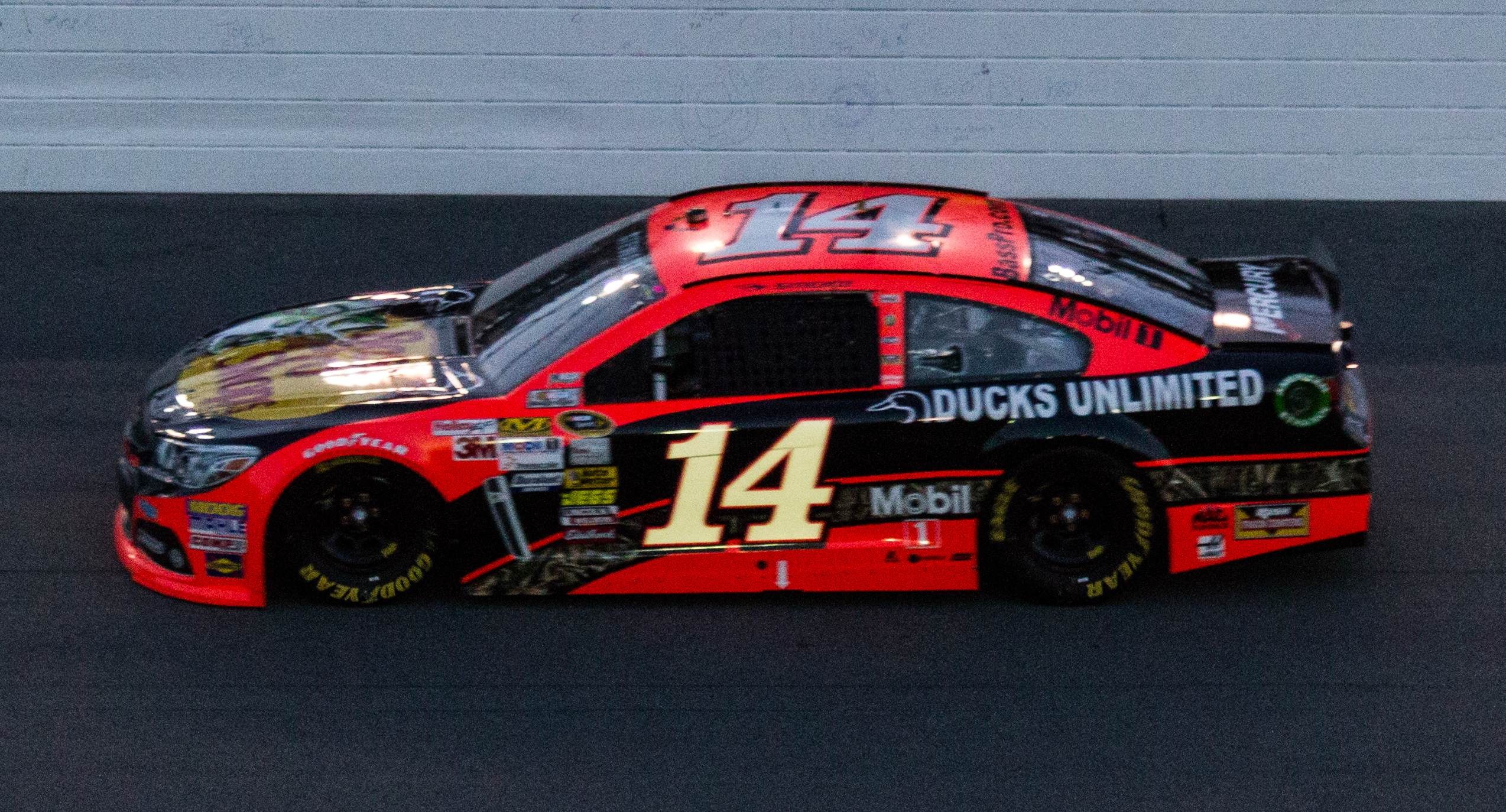
Tony Stewart's No. 14 at the 2013 Coke Zero 400

For 2013, Stewart received a new primary sponsor in Bass Pro Shops, which moved over from Earnhardt Ganassi Racing to replace Office Depot. Bass Pro Shops joined Mobil 1, which sponsored eleven races while Bass Pro Shops sponsored eighteen. As of June 20, 2013, sponsorship for the other nine races has yet to be determined, although Stewart said Haas Automation could serve that role if absolutely necessary. Stewart subsequently won the 2013 FedEx 400. On August 5, Stewart broke his right leg in a sprint car accident, and was replaced by Max Papis at Watkins Glen. Austin Dillon was named to drive the 14 at Michigan. After the Michigan race, it was announced that Stewart would miss the remainder of the season, with Mark Martin stepping in as a replacement for twelve of the thirteen races, with Dillon driving at Talladega.

As Stewart was not cleared to drive yet at the end of the 2013 season, including all official off-season testing, Martin continued driving the No. 14 during off-season testing. Stewart was eventually cleared to race.

At the 2014 Cheez-It 355 at The Glen, Regan Smith replaced Stewart after he had hit a driver during a sprint car race the night before. Jeff Burton replaced Stewart for the Pure Michigan 400 and the Irwin Tools Night Race.

On September 30, 2015, it was announced that Stewart would retire after 2016, and former MWR driver Clint Bowyer would take over his ride in 2017. In 2016, Stewart was injured while riding a sand rail and was ruled out for the Daytona 500. In his place, former Michael Waltrip Racing driver Brian Vickers and Richard Childress Racing driver Ty Dillon drove the car. Stewart returned to the car at Richmond. He later won the Toyota/Save Mart 350 at Sonoma Raceway, passing Denny Hamlin on the last lap, and snapping an 84-race winless streak. Stewart would be eliminated at the Round of 16, ending his last chance of a championship.

Clint Bowyer (2017–2020)

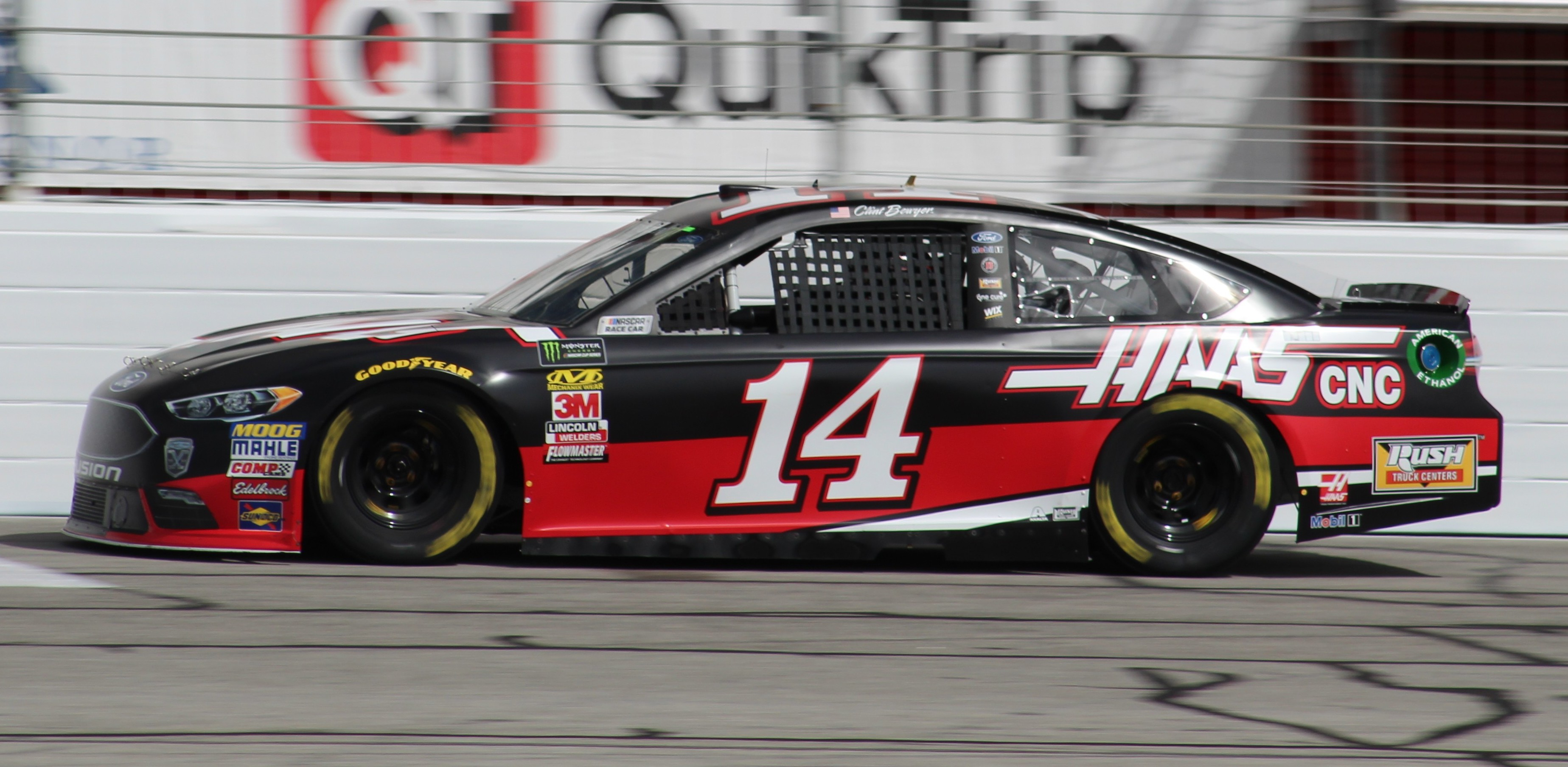
Clint Bowyer in the No. 14 at Atlanta Motor Speedway in 2018

Bowyer struggled during his first year with SHR, scoring seven top 10s and finishing 18th in the 2017 points standings. The 2018 season saw a resurgence in Bowyer's performance, with two wins at Martinsville and Michigan, nine top-fives, and 15 top-10 finishes. This improvement in consistency has resulted in Bowyer's return to the Playoffs since the 2015 season and the No. 14 team's first Playoff run since 2016. He made it to the Round of 8 until he was eliminated at Phoenix after a tire blew and he was sent to the outer wall. Bowyer finished the season 12th in points.

Bowyer was winless in 2019, but stayed consistent enough to once again make the Playoffs. He made it to the Round of 12 and was eliminated at Kansas. Bowyer finished ninth in the points standings.

On December 4, 2019, Stewart–Haas Racing announced that Johnny Klausmeier would replace Mike Bugarewicz as the crew chief of the No. 14 team in 2020. During the 2020 season, Bowyer remained winless, but he used his consistency to make the Playoffs. He made it to the Round of 12 and was eliminated at the Charlotte Roval.

On October 8, 2020, Bowyer announced he would retire from full-time driving at the end of the 2020 season and work as a NASCAR on Fox commentator starting in 2021.

Chase Briscoe (2021–2024)

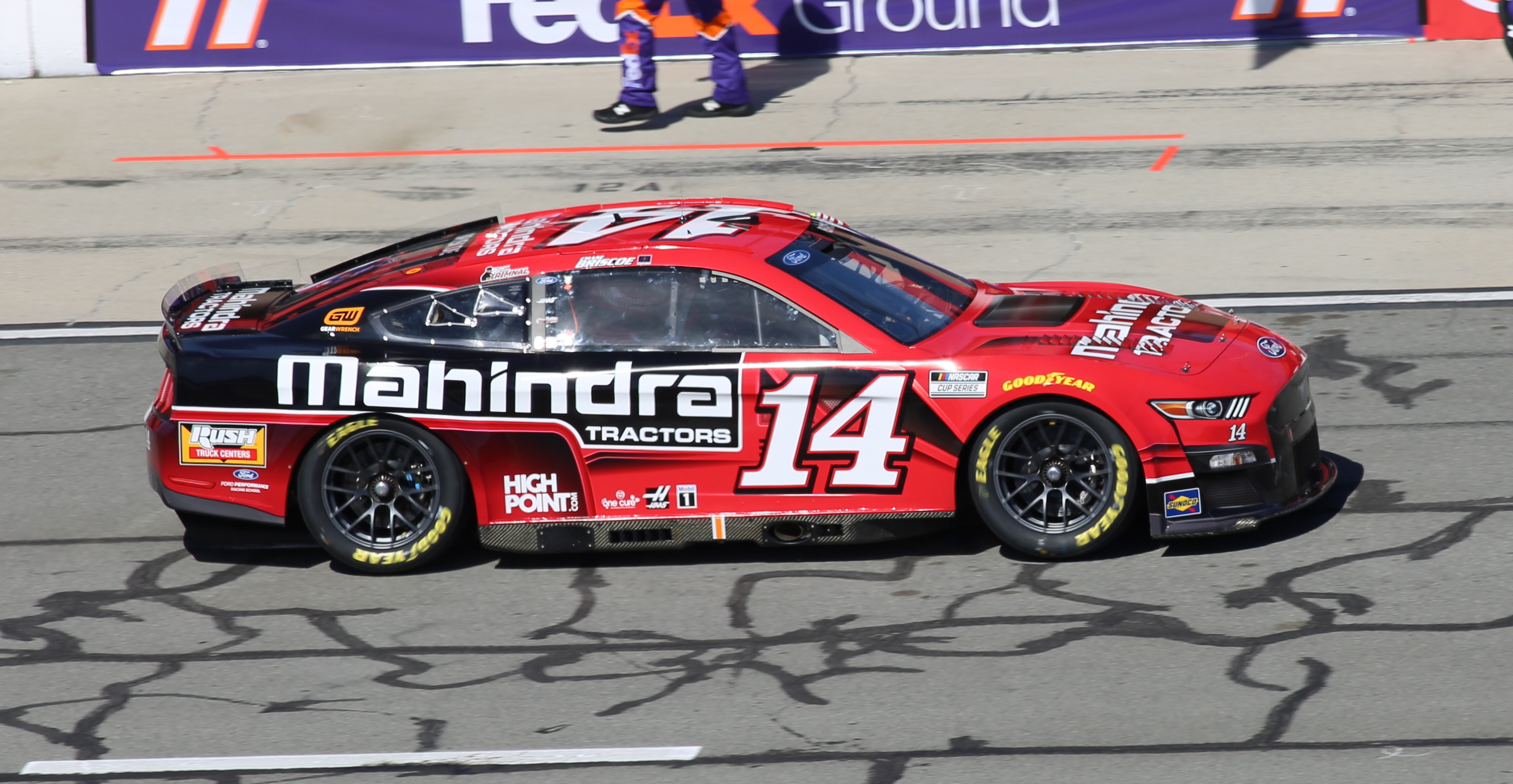
Chase Briscoe in the No. 14 at Auto Club Speedway in 2022

On October 20, 2020, Stewart–Haas Racing announced that Chase Briscoe would replace Bowyer in the No. 14 in 2021, promoting him from its Xfinity side; sponsor HighPoint.com joined Briscoe and the No. 14. In his rookie season, Briscoe scored three top-10s and finished 23rd in points. In addition, he won the 2021 NASCAR Rookie of the Year honors.

Briscoe began the 2022 season with a 22nd-place finish at the 2022 Busch Light Clash at The Coliseum. He placed third at the 2022 Daytona 500, missing out on the win by 0.091 seconds to Bubba Wallace and winner Austin Cindric. Briscoe won his first Cup Series race at Phoenix on March 13. He led 101 out of 312 laps en route to his maiden victory, becoming the 200th different driver in series history to have won a race in the Cup Series. Briscoe was eliminated following the Round of 8 after finishing 10th at Martinsville.

Briscoe started the 2023 season with a 35th-place DNF at the 2023 Daytona 500. On May 31, following the 2023 Coca-Cola 600, NASCAR issued an L3 penalty on the No. 14 after a post-race inspection revealed a counterfeit engine panel NACA duct; as a result, the team was docked 125 owner and driver points and 25 playoff points, and Klausmeier was suspended for six races and fined US$250,000.

Briscoe started the 2024 season with a 10th place finish at the 2024 Daytona 500. He broke a 73-race winless streak at the Southern 500 to make the playoffs.

==== Car No. 14 results ====
Year	Driver	No.	Make	1	2	3	4	5	6	7	8	9	10	11	12	13	14	15	16	17	18	19	20	21	22	23	24	25	26	27	28	29	30	31	32	33	34	35	36	Owners	Pts
2009	Tony Stewart	14	Chevy	DAY; 8	CAL; 8	LVS; 26	ATL; 8	BRI; 17	MAR; 3	TEX; 4	PHO; 2	TAL; 23	RCH; 2	DAR; 3	CLT; 19	DOV; 2	POC; 1	MCH; 7	SON; 2	NHA; 5	DAY; 1*	CHI; 4	IND; 3	POC; 10	GLN; 1*	MCH; 17	BRI; 33	ATL; 11	RCH; 17	NHA; 14	DOV; 9	KAN; 1	CAL; 5	CLT; 13	MAR; 9	TAL; 35	TEX; 6	PHO; 25	HOM; 22	6th	6309
2010	Tony Stewart	14	Chevy	DAY; 22	CAL; 9	LVS; 7	ATL; 13	BRI; 2	MAR; 26	PHO; 23	TEX; 32	TAL; 16	RCH; 23	DAR; 23	DOV; 9	CLT; 15	POC; 3	MCH; 5	SON; 9	NHA; 2	DAY; 25	CHI; 9	IND; 5	POC; 2	GLN; 7	MCH; 6	BRI; 27	ATL; 1*	RCH; 16	NHA; 24	DOV; 21	KAN; 4	CAL; 1	CLT; 21	MAR; 24	TAL; 31	TEX; 11	PHO; 17	HOM; 8	7th	6221
2011	Tony Stewart	14	Chevy	DAY; 13	PHO; 7	LVS; 2*	BRI; 19	CAL; 13	MAR; 34	TEX; 12	TAL; 17	RCH; 9	DAR; 7	DOV; 29	CLT; 17	KAN; 8	POC; 21	MCH; 7	SON; 39	DAY; 11	KEN; 12	NHA; 2	IND; 6	POC; 11	GLN; 27	MCH; 9	BRI; 28	ATL; 3	RCH; 7	CHI; 1	NHA; 1	DOV; 25	KAN; 15	CLT; 8	TAL; 7*	MAR; 1	TEX; 1*	PHO; 3*	HOM; 1	1st	2403
2012	Tony Stewart	14	Chevy	DAY; 16	PHO; 22	LVS; 1*	BRI; 14	CAL; 1	MAR; 7	TEX; 24	KAN; 13	RCH; 3	TAL; 24	DAR; 3	CLT; 25	DOV; 25	POC; 3	MCH; 2	SON; 2	KEN; 32	DAY; 1	NHA; 12	IND; 10	POC; 5	GLN; 19	MCH; 32	BRI; 27	ATL; 22	RCH; 4	CHI; 6	NHA; 7	DOV; 20	TAL; 22	CLT; 13	KAN; 5	MAR; 27	TEX; 5	PHO; 19	HOM; 17	9th	2311
2013	Tony Stewart	14	Chevy	DAY; 41	PHO; 8	LVS; 11	BRI; 31	CAL; 22	MAR; 17	TEX; 21	KAN; 21	RCH; 18	TAL; 27	DAR; 15	CLT; 7	DOV; 1	POC; 4	MCH; 5	SON; 28	KEN; 20	DAY; 2	NHA; 26	IND; 4	POC; 9																18th	941
2013	Max Papis	14	Chevy																						GLN; 15															18th	941
2013	Austin Dillon	14	Chevy																							MCH; 14									TAL; 26					18th	941
2013	Mark Martin	14	Chevy																								BRI; 20	ATL; 25	RCH; 9	CHI; 17	NHA; 23	DOV; 19	KAN; 22	CLT; 42		MAR; 36	TEX; 11	PHO; 15	HOM; 19	18th	941
2014	Tony Stewart	14	Chevy	DAY; 35	PHO; 16	LVS; 33	BRI; 4	CAL; 5	MAR; 17	TEX; 10	DAR; 9	RCH; 26	TAL; 43	KAN; 20	CLT; 13	DOV; 7	POC; 13	MCH; 11	SON; 19	KEN; 11	DAY; 40	NHA; 7	IND; 17	POC; 36				ATL; 41	RCH; 15	CHI; 18	NHA; 30	DOV; 14	KAN; 17	CLT; 21	TAL; 34	MAR; 4	TEX; 11	PHO; 20	HOM; 43	25th	842
2014	Regan Smith	14	Chevy																						GLN; 37															25th	842
2014	Jeff Burton	14	Chevy																							MCH; 37	BRI; 15													25th	842
2015	Tony Stewart	14	Chevy	DAY; 42	ATL; 30	LVS; 33	PHO; 39	CAL; 14	MAR; 20	TEX; 24	BRI; 6	RCH; 41	TAL; 19	KAN; 39	CLT; 21	DOV; 16	POC; 21	MCH; 28	SON; 12	DAY; 14	KEN; 33	NHA; 20	IND; 28	POC; 9	GLN; 43	MCH; 21	BRI; 19	DAR; 15	RCH; 29	CHI; 25	NHA; 11	DOV; 26	CLT; 26	KAN; 35	TAL; 25	MAR; 10	TEX; 42	PHO; 27	HOM; 29	28th	695
2016	Brian Vickers	14	Chevy	DAY; 26		LVS; 36		CAL; 13	MAR; 7	TEX; 37																														15th	2211
2016	Ty Dillon	14	Chevy		ATL; 17		PHO; 15				BRI; 25																													15th	2211
2016	Tony Stewart	14	Chevy									RCH; 19	TAL; 6	KAN; 12	DOV; 34	CLT; 24	POC; 34	MCH; 7	SON; 1	DAY; 26	KEN; 5	NHA; 2	IND; 11	POC; 5	GLN; 5	BRI; 30	MCH; 21	DAR; 35	RCH; 33	CHI; 16	NHA; 23	DOV; 13	CLT; 9	KAN; 16	TAL; 32	MAR; 26	TEX; 31	PHO; 15	HOM; 22	15th	2211
2017	Clint Bowyer	14	Ford	DAY; 32	ATL; 11	LVS; 10	PHO; 13	CAL; 3	MAR; 7	TEX; 11	BRI; 2	RCH; 15	TAL; 14	KAN; 9	CLT; 14	DOV; 31	POC; 17	MCH; 26	SON; 2	DAY; 2	KEN; 13	NHA; 7	IND; 30	POC; 6	GLN; 5	MCH; 23	BRI; 19	DAR; 40	RCH; 24	CHI; 13	NHA; 7	DOV; 6	CLT; 27	TAL; 35	KAN; 19	MAR; 3	TEX; 36	PHO; 13	HOM; 12	18th	871
2018	Clint Bowyer	14	Ford	DAY; 15	ATL; 3	LVS; 18	PHO; 6	CAL; 11	MAR; 1*	TEX; 9	BRI; 8	RCH; 9	TAL; 31	DOV; 2	KAN; 15	CLT; 12	POC; 20	MCH; 1	SON; 3	CHI; 5	DAY; 22	KEN; 12	NHA; 35	POC; 11	GLN; 11	MCH; 12	BRI; 6	DAR; 36	IND; 5*	LVS; 23	RCH; 10	CLT; 3	DOV; 35	TAL; 2	KAN; 13	MAR; 21	TEX; 26	PHO; 35	HOM; 8	12th	2272
2019	Clint Bowyer	14	Ford	DAY; 20	ATL; 5	LVS; 14	PHO; 11	CAL; 38	MAR; 7	TEX; 2	BRI; 7	RCH; 3	TAL; 29	DOV; 9	KAN; 5	CLT; 24	POC; 5	MCH; 35	SON; 11	CHI; 37	DAY; 34	KEN; 6	NHA; 20	POC; 11	GLN; 20	MCH; 37	BRI; 7	DAR; 6	IND; 5	LVS; 25	RCH; 8	CLT; 4	DOV; 10	TAL; 23	KAN; 8	MAR; 35	TEX; 11	PHO; 8	HOM; 6	9th	2290
2020	Clint Bowyer	14	Ford	DAY; 6	LVS; 12	CAL; 23	PHO; 5	DAR; 17	DAR; 22*	CLT; 39	CLT; 16	BRI; 2	ATL; 20	MAR; 17	HOM; 11	TAL; 25	POC; 7	POC; 8	IND; 16	KEN; 14	TEX; 11	KAN; 14	NHA; 18	MCH; 19	MCH; 14	DAY; 6	DOV; 6	DOV; 16	DAY; 19	DAR; 10	RCH; 10	BRI; 6	LVS; 12	TAL; 33	CLT; 10	KAN; 26	TEX; 17	MAR; 8	PHO; 14	12th	2254
2021	Chase Briscoe	14	Ford	DAY; 19	DAY; 32	HOM; 18	LVS; 21	PHO; 22	ATL; 23	BRI; 20	MAR; 27	RCH; 22	TAL; 11	KAN; 20	DAR; 11	DOV; 35	COA; 6	CLT; 23	SON; 17	NSH; 31	POC; 24	POC; 21	ROA; 6	ATL; 15	NHA; 27	GLN; 9	IND; 26	MCH; 11	DAY; 21	DAR; 19	RCH; 16	BRI; 13	LVS; 14	TAL; 14	CLT; 22	TEX; 15	KAN; 19	MAR; 22	PHO; 35	23rd	655
2022	Chase Briscoe	14	Ford	DAY; 3	CAL; 16	LVS; 35	PHO; 1	ATL; 15	COA; 30	RCH; 11	MAR; 9	BRI; 22	TAL; 37	DOV; 13	DAR; 20	KAN; 24	CLT; 4	GTW; 24	SON; 13	NSH; 34	ROA; 14	ATL; 16	NHA; 15	POC; 15	IND; 23	MCH; 20	RCH; 23	GLN; 25	DAY; 31	DAR; 27	KAN; 13	BRI; 14	TEX; 5	TAL; 10	CLT; 9	LVS; 4	HOM; 36	MAR; 9	PHO; 4	9th	2292
2023	Chase Briscoe	14	Ford	DAY; 35	CAL; 20	LVS; 28	PHO; 7	ATL; 24	COA; 15	RCH; 12	BRD; 5	MAR; 5	TAL; 4	DOV; 30	KAN; 32	DAR; 17	CLT; 20	GTW; 34	SON; 29	NSH; 31	CSC; 20	ATL; 22	NHA; 10	POC; 29	RCH; 11	MCH; 31	IND; 6	GLN; 35	DAY; 30*	DAR; 15	KAN; 19	BRI; 27	TEX; 10	TAL; 13	ROV; 28	LVS; 33	HOM; 17	MAR; 4	PHO; 24	30th	534
2024	Chase Briscoe	14	Ford	DAY; 10	ATL; 31	LVS; 21	PHO; 9	BRI; 13	COA; 13	RCH; 18	MAR; 10	TEX; 6	TAL; 12	DOV; 19	KAN; 21	DAR; 5	CLT; 25	GTW; 17	SON; 34	IOW; 28	NHA; 2	NSH; 21	CSC; 32	POC; 15	IND; 24	RCH; 21	MCH; 31	DAY; 14	DAR; 1	ATL; 38	GLN; 6	BRI; 8	KAN; 24	TAL; 30	ROV; 36	LVS; 26	HOM; 12	MAR; 15	PHO; 29	14th	2184

=== Car No. 41 history ===
Kurt Busch (2014–2018)

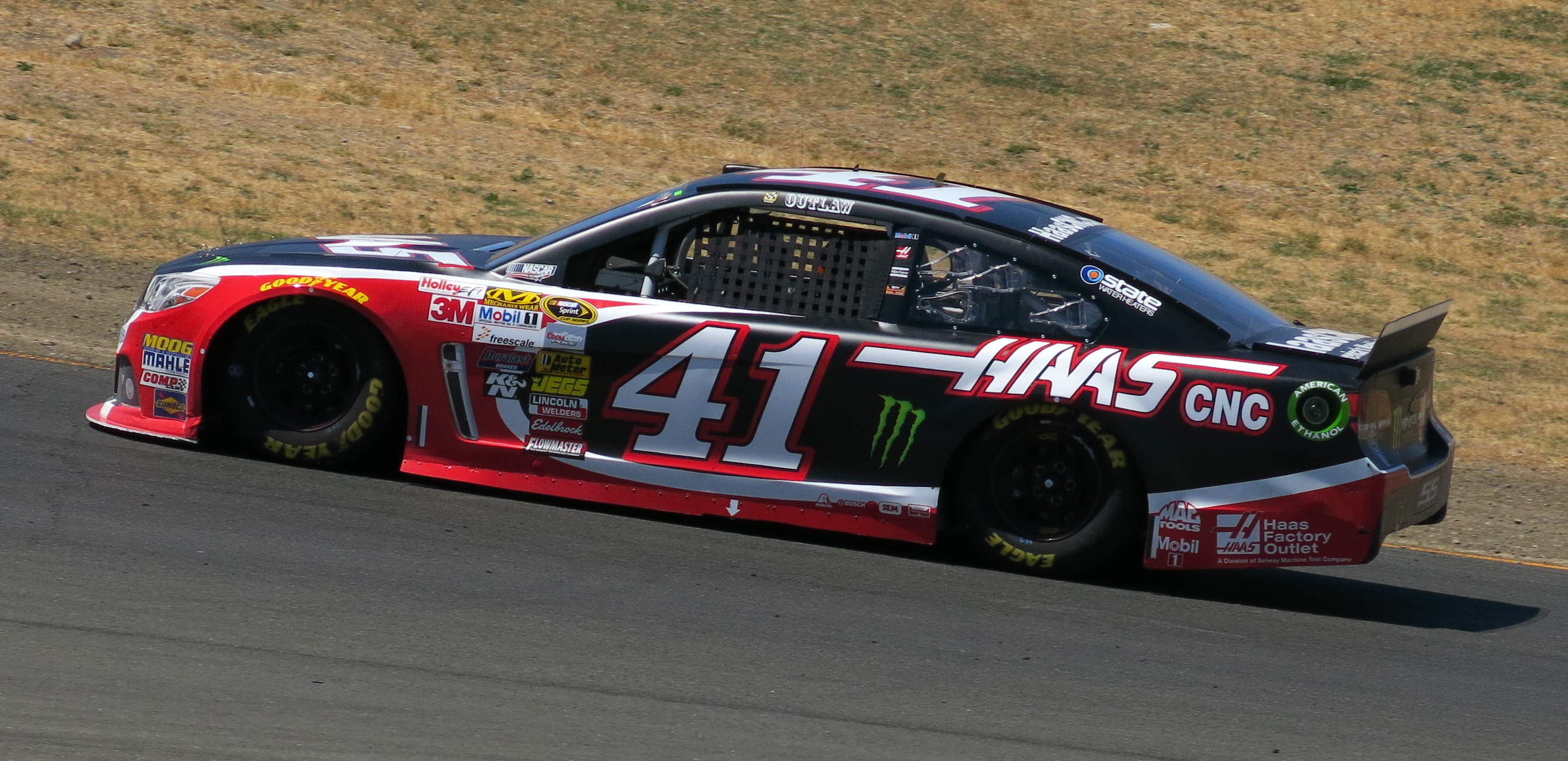
Kurt Busch in the No. 41 at Sonoma Raceway in 2014.

The No. 41 car was the fourth and last team added to Stewart–Haas Racing, debuting at the beginning of the 2014 season. On August 26, 2013, Kurt Busch announced he would be leaving Furniture Row Racing to drive the fourth Stewart–Haas car. The deal was initiated by team founder Gene Haas, who would sponsor the full season through his company Haas Automation. The signing of Busch came with some controversy, considering that Ryan Newman's contract was not renewed under the pretense that there was not enough funding to run both Newman's No. 39 team and Kevin Harvick's new No. 4 team. In addition, Busch was signed by Haas while co-owner Tony Stewart, a noted rival of Busch's, was more-or-less incapacitated due to his leg injury, with Stewart publicly saying "It was his (Haas') decision" but also "Kurt [Busch] is a huge asset." On September 24, 2013, it was revealed that the car would be No. 41, and later that Daniel Knost would be Busch's crew chief. SHR purchased the No. 41's charter from the now-defunct Michael Waltrip Racing.

In only his sixth race with the team, Busch took the checkered flag at the 2014 STP 500 at Martinsville Speedway on March 30, 2014. Busch fought back from a pit road incident with former teammate Brad Keselowski and held off rival and Martinsville ace Jimmie Johnson for his 25th career victory and his first victory since 2011. The team struggled from a lack of consistency, leading to a crew chief swap with the No. 10 team. Tony Gibson became the No. 41 crew chief. Busch made the 2014 Chase for the Sprint Cup, but failed to make it past the opening round.

Busch started the 2015 season on suspension while he was investigated for allegations of domestic violence. Regan Smith took over the No. 41 car for the first three races of the year, finishing in the top 20 at both of the first two races. Although Smith competed for Xfinity Series points, the No. 41 car remained eligible for the owner's championship. Busch's suspension was lifted on March 11 and he returned to the No. 41 car at Phoenix, with a waiver to remain eligible for the Chase for the Sprint Cup. Busch scored his second victory in the No. 41 at Richmond in April. He scored his second win of the season at Michigan in June, in a rain-shortened event. Busch earned a spot in the Chase and made it through the three first rounds, but failed to make it to the final round. Busch finished eighth in the final points standings, with two wins and 21 top-ten finishes.

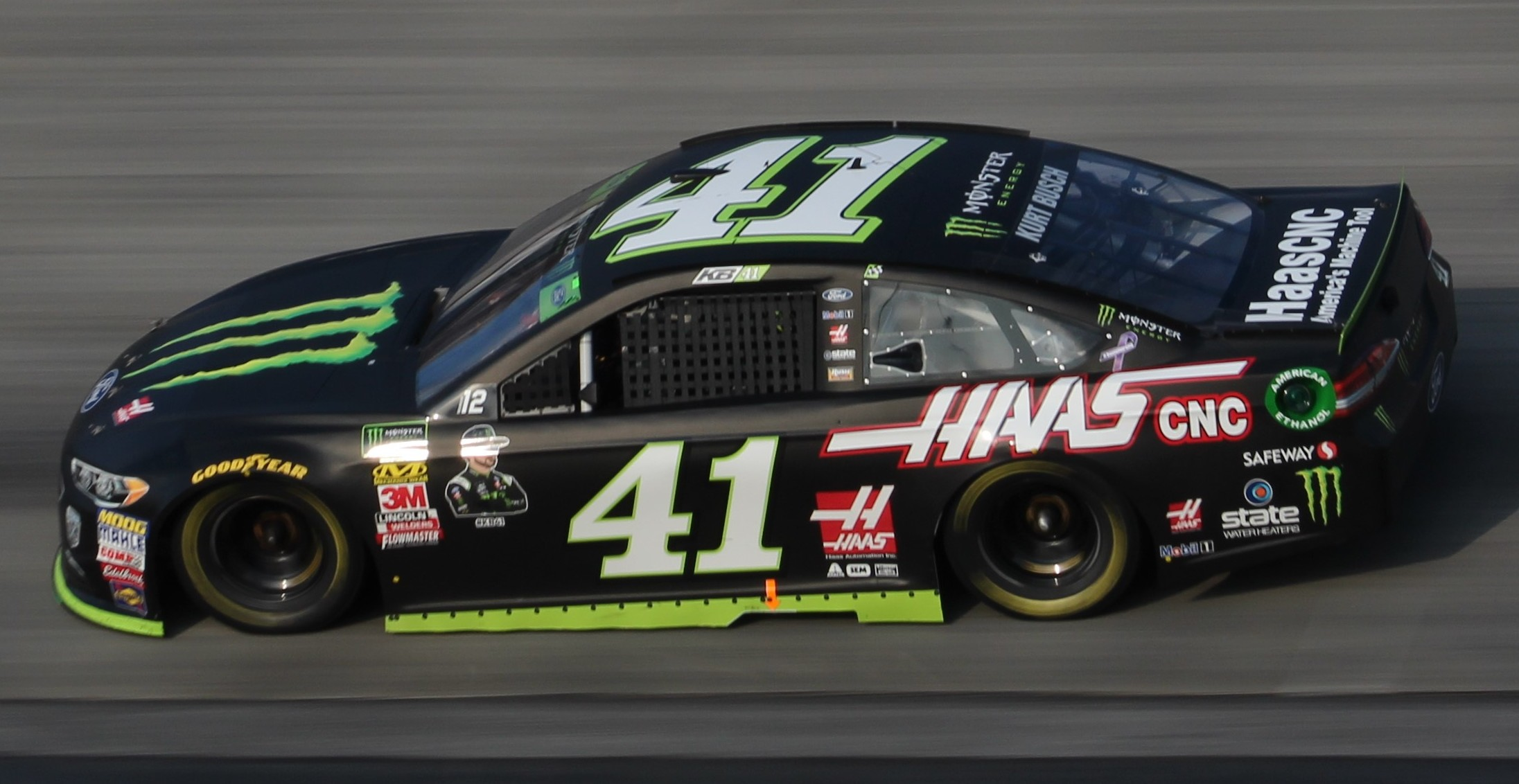
Kurt Busch's No. 41 at Dover International Speedway in 2018

In October 2015, Busch signed a multi-year extension with SHR. For the 2016 season, Monster Energy became a co-primary sponsor of the team along with Haas Automation, after being a personal sponsor of Busch since 2012. Before the Cup series season, Busch and SHR were informed that because the No. 41 team was not formed until 2014, they were not eligible for one of the 36 charters NASCAR granted to teams who participated full-time in Cup. Stewart–Haas Racing managed to secure Busch a spot in every race of the 2016 NASCAR Sprint Cup season by purchasing a charter from the defunct Michael Waltrip Racing. Busch's lone victory of the 2016 season came at Pocono Raceway on June 6 after preserving enough fuel to hold off Dale Earnhardt Jr., finishing seventh in the final standings.

Busch started 2017 with a crash in the Advance Auto Parts Clash after Johnson got loose and spun, collecting Busch in the process. A week later, Busch went on to win his first Daytona 500 in his long career, passing Kyle Larson on the last lap. This also gave SHR their first Daytona 500 win, as well as their first win with Ford. This was Busch's only win in 2017, and he finished the season 14th in points. This 58-race winless streak was broken with a victory at the Bristol night race in 2018. Busch made it to the Round of 8 of the Playoffs until he was eliminated at Phoenix after a late crash with Denny Hamlin and Chase Elliott. He finished the season seventh in points. On December 2, 2018, Busch announced that he will not return to SHR in 2019.

Daniel Suárez (2019)

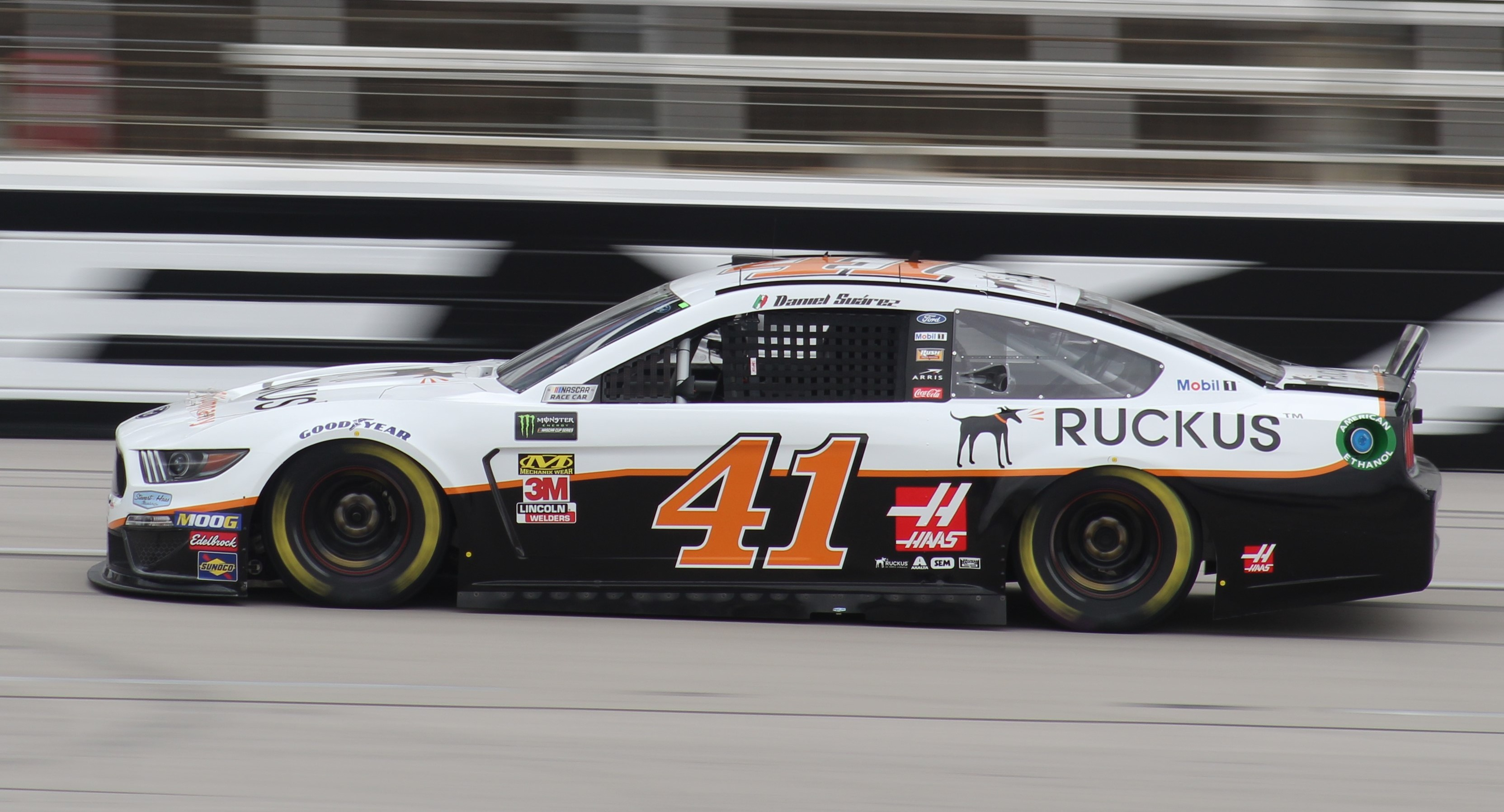
Daniel Suárez in the No. 41 at Texas Motor Speedway in 2019

On January 7, 2019, Stewart–Haas Racing announced that former Joe Gibbs Racing driver Daniel Suárez would take over the No. 41 in the 2019 season. In addition, Suárez brought over Arris International to sponsor the team. Suárez struggled to make a decent finish throughout the 2019 season, scoring four top fives and 11 top 10 finishes and failing to make the Playoffs. On November 14, 2019, Suárez announced he would leave the 41 at the end of the season.

Cole Custer (2020–2022)

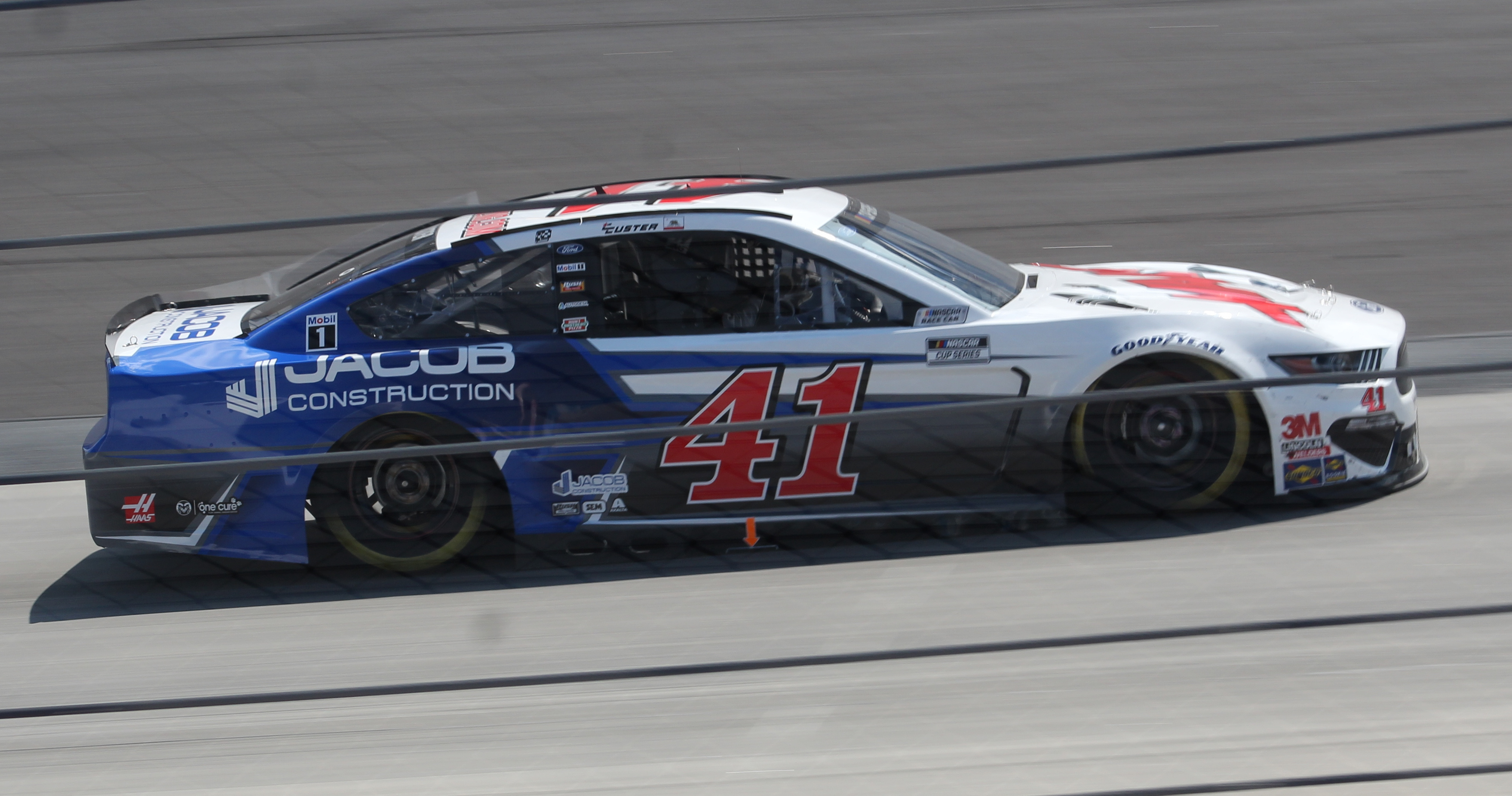
Cole Custer in the No. 41 at Dover International Speedway in 2020

On November 15, 2019, Stewart–Haas Racing announced that Custer will replace Suárez in the No. 41 Ford in 2020. On December 4, Stewart–Haas Racing announced that Mike Shiplett will replace Billy Scott as the crew chief of the No. 41 team. Both Shiplett and Custer worked together during the 2019 NASCAR Xfinity Series. After just collecting a top ten finish in the first 16 races, Custer finished 5th at Indianapolis, his first career top-five and the team's best run at that point. With 1 lap to go at the Quaker State 400 at Kentucky Speedway the following week later, Custer slipped by Ryan Blaney, Kevin Harvick, and Martin Truex Jr. in an incredible four-wide pass for the lead to cruise to his first career victory. Custer became the first driver to score their first career win with the team. His win earned him a spot in the 2020 playoffs, but he was eliminated after the Round of 16 at Bristol.

On October 11, 2022, Custer and Shiplett were fined US$100,000 after Custer intentionally slowed down and checked up on the last lap of the Charlotte Roval race, allowing his SHR teammate Chase Briscoe to advance to the next round of the playoffs. In addition, Shiplett was indefinitely suspended and the No. 41 team was docked 50 owner and driver points.

Ryan Preece (2023–2024)

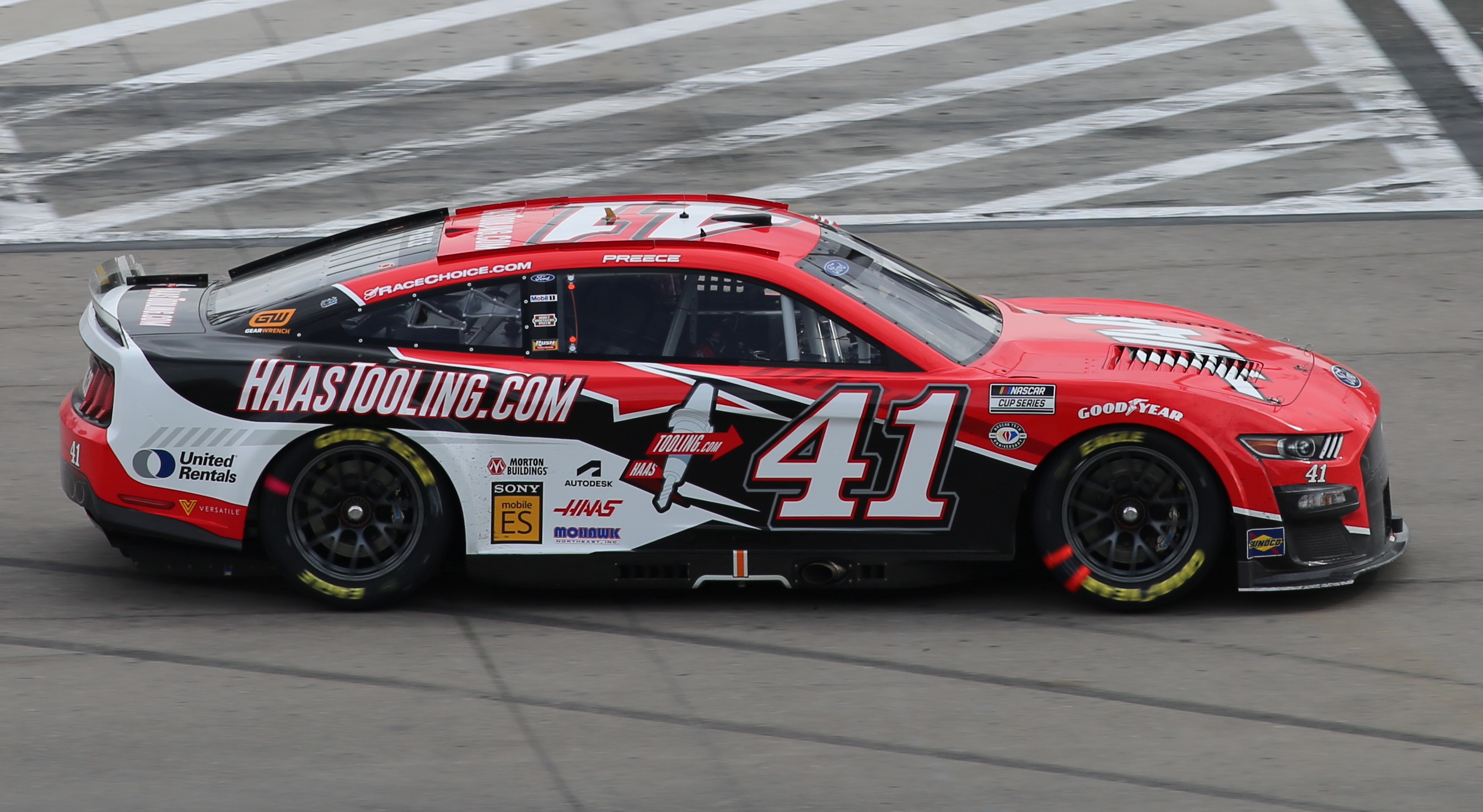
Preece in the No. 41 at Las Vegas Motor Speedway in 2023

On November 16, 2022, SHR announced that Ryan Preece will replace Custer in the No. 41 for the 2023 season while Custer will move back to the Xfinity Series. Preece started the 2023 season with a 36th place DNF at the 2023 Daytona 500. He scored his first career pole at Martinsville. Throughout the season, he struggled throughout the regular season with only one top-five finish at Richmond. On August 26, 2023, at the Daytona night race, Preece was running toward the tail of the lead pack in the closing stages of the race. On lap 157, while racing down the backstretch, he was pushed from the rear by Erik Jones. The contact sent Preece down the track, where he collided with teammate Chase Briscoe, and spun onto the apron. As the car slid, aerodynamic forces lifted the car off of the ground and rolled it onto its roof. The car planted upside-down in the grass before violently barrel-rolling roughly ten times before finally coming to a rest on its wheels. After a few moments, Preece exited the car under his own power, and was put on a stretcher, and taken to a nearby hospital for further evaluation. During his time in the hospital, he tweeted that he would be coming back to race again and expressed disappointment that his race ended in the fashion it did. He was discharged the next morning. The car was taken back to the NASCAR Research and Development center to be studied. Safety concerns emerged as film of the crash showed that the roof hatch, designed to allow the driver to escape from the car through a method other than via the driver's side window, was detached from the car early in the crash, exposing the cockpit during the remainder of the crash. Given his points situation entering the race, the crash eliminated Preece's chances of contending in the NASCAR playoffs.

Preece started the 2024 season with a 23rd place finish at the 2024 Daytona 500. Following the Atlanta race, the No. 41 was hit with an L1 penalty and docked 35 owner and driver points after pre-race inspection revealed unapproved roof rails.

==== Car No. 41 results ====
Year	Driver	No.	Make	1	2	3	4	5	6	7	8	9	10	11	12	13	14	15	16	17	18	19	20	21	22	23	24	25	26	27	28	29	30	31	32	33	34	35	36	Owners	Pts
2014	Kurt Busch	41	Chevy	DAY; 21	PHO; 39	LVS; 26	BRI; 35	CAL; 3	MAR; 1	TEX; 39	DAR; 31	RCH; 23	TAL; 33	KAN; 29	CLT; 40	DOV; 18	POC; 3	MCH; 13	SON; 12	KEN; 12	DAY; 3*	NHA; 17	IND; 28	POC; 13	GLN; 3	MCH; 31	BRI; 5	ATL; 13	RCH; 7	CHI; 8	NHA; 36	DOV; 18	KAN; 42	CLT; 11	TAL; 7	MAR; 36	TEX; 8	PHO; 7	HOM; 11	12th	2263
2015	Regan Smith	41	Chevy	DAY; 16	ATL; 17	LVS; 16																																		8th	2333
2015	Kurt Busch	41	Chevy				PHO; 5	CAL; 3*	MAR; 14	TEX; 14	BRI; 15	RCH; 1*	TAL; 12	KAN; 8	CLT; 10	DOV; 31	POC; 5	MCH; 1	SON; 2	DAY; 5	KEN; 10	NHA; 10	IND; 8	POC; 37	GLN; 5	MCH; 20	BRI; 14	DAR; 6	RCH; 15	CHI; 3	NHA; 19	DOV; 17	CLT; 5	KAN; 6	TAL; 10	MAR; 34	TEX; 7	PHO; 7	HOM; 8	8th	2333
2016	Kurt Busch	41	Chevy	DAY; 10	ATL; 4	LVS; 9	PHO; 6	CAL; 30	MAR; 13	TEX; 9	BRI; 3	RCH; 10	TAL; 8	KAN; 3	DOV; 5	CLT; 6	POC; 1	MCH; 10	SON; 10	DAY; 23	KEN; 4	NHA; 22	IND; 16	POC; 10	GLN; 11	BRI; 38	MCH; 12	DAR; 34	RCH; 8	CHI; 13	NHA; 5	DOV; 15	CLT; 8	KAN; 13	TAL; 4	MAR; 22	TEX; 20	PHO; 5	HOM; 13	7th	2296
2017	Kurt Busch	41	Ford	DAY; 1	ATL; 7	LVS; 30	PHO; 25	CAL; 24	MAR; 37	TEX; 10	BRI; 25	RCH; 8	TAL; 6	KAN; 19	CLT; 6	DOV; 37	POC; 4	MCH; 12	SON; 7	DAY; 28	KEN; 30	NHA; 8	IND; 29	POC; 13	GLN; 6	MCH; 11	BRI; 5	DAR; 3	RCH; 4	CHI; 19	NHA; 37	DOV; 20	CLT; 22	TAL; 25	KAN; 2	MAR; 22	TEX; 9	PHO; 21	HOM; 22	14th	2217
2018	Kurt Busch	41	Ford	DAY; 26	ATL; 8	LVS; 35	PHO; 10	CAL; 14	MAR; 11	TEX; 7	BRI; 22	RCH; 11	TAL; 2	DOV; 5	KAN; 8	CLT; 8	POC; 19	MCH; 3	SON; 6	CHI; 17	DAY; 37	KEN; 6	NHA; 8*	POC; 9	GLN; 9	MCH; 6	BRI; 1	DAR; 6	IND; 6	LVS; 21	RCH; 18	CLT; 5	DOV; 5	TAL; 14*	KAN; 18	MAR; 6	TEX; 7	PHO; 32	HOM; 10	7th	2350
2019	Daniel Suárez	41	Ford	DAY; 33	ATL; 10	LVS; 17	PHO; 23	CAL; 13	MAR; 10	TEX; 3	BRI; 8	RCH; 18	TAL; 12	DOV; 11	KAN; 14	CLT; 18	POC; 8	MCH; 4	SON; 17	CHI; 24	DAY; 40	KEN; 8	NHA; 19	POC; 24	GLN; 17	MCH; 5	BRI; 8	DAR; 11	IND; 11	LVS; 20	RCH; 9	CLT; 34	DOV; 14	TAL; 32	KAN; 32	MAR; 31	TEX; 3	PHO; 15	HOM; 14	17th	846
2020	Cole Custer	41	Ford	DAY; 37	LVS; 19	CAL; 18	PHO; 9	DAR; 22	DAR; 31	CLT; 12	CLT; 18	BRI; 35	ATL; 19	MAR; 29	HOM; 22	TAL; 22	POC; 16	POC; 17	IND; 5	KEN; 1	TEX; 39	KAN; 7	NHA; 8	MCH; 34	MCH; 25	DAY; 22	DOV; 11	DOV; 10	DAY; 30	DAR; 12	RCH; 14	BRI; 23	LVS; 16	TAL; 31	CLT; 9	KAN; 14	TEX; 14	MAR; 13	PHO; 28	16th	2202
2021	Cole Custer	41	Ford	DAY; 11	DAY; 13	HOM; 23	LVS; 25	PHO; 31	ATL; 18	BRI; 24	MAR; 18	RCH; 23	TAL; 10	KAN; 24	DAR; 36	DOV; 10	COA; 36	CLT; 21	SON; 20	NSH; 30	POC; 38	POC; 24	ROA; 17	ATL; 17	NHA; 14	GLN; 18	IND; 25	MCH; 23	DAY; 24	DAR; 11	RCH; 22	BRI; 28	LVS; 29	TAL; 13	CLT; 18	TEX; 19	KAN; 18	MAR; 23	PHO; 13	26th	575
2022	Cole Custer	41	Ford	DAY; 20	CAL; 11	LVS; 33	PHO; 16	ATL; 34	COA; 23	RCH; 22	MAR; 21	BRI; 13	TAL; 29	DOV; 15	DAR; 26	KAN; 22	CLT; 21	GTW; 29	SON; 21	NSH; 26	ROA; 15	ATL; 9	NHA; 27	POC; 17	IND; 9	MCH; 31	RCH; 26	GLN; 11	DAY; 16	DAR; 14	KAN; 22	BRI; 8	TEX; 35	TAL; 21	CLT; 24	LVS; 20	HOM; 24	MAR; 14	PHO; 16	25th	589
2023	Ryan Preece	41	Ford	DAY; 36	CAL; 33	LVS; 23	PHO; 12	ATL; 28	COA; 32	RCH; 18	BRD; 24	MAR; 15*	TAL; 34	DOV; 17	KAN; 27	DAR; 15	CLT; 13	GTW; 17	SON; 13	NSH; 16	CSC; 15	ATL; 24	NHA; 28	POC; 31	RCH; 5	MCH; 22	IND; 31	GLN; 17	DAY; 31	DAR; 28	KAN; 18	BRI; 12	TEX; 23	TAL; 8	ROV; 11	LVS; 26	HOM; 13	MAR; 20	PHO; 14	23rd	637
2024	Ryan Preece	41	Ford	DAY; 23	ATL; 16	LVS; 23	PHO; 23	BRI; 14	COA; 23	RCH; 28	MAR; 9	TEX; 12	TAL; 14	DOV; 37	KAN; 28	DAR; 17	CLT; 26	GTW; 29	SON; 18	IOW; 27	NHA; 11	NSH; 4	CSC; 34	POC; 30	IND; 26	RCH; 25	MCH; 11	DAY; 39	DAR; 12	ATL; 17	GLN; 9	BRI; 7	KAN; 16	TAL; 35	ROV; 25	LVS; 22	HOM; 10	MAR; 14	PHO; 37	26th	584

== Xfinity Series ==
=== Car No. 00 history ===
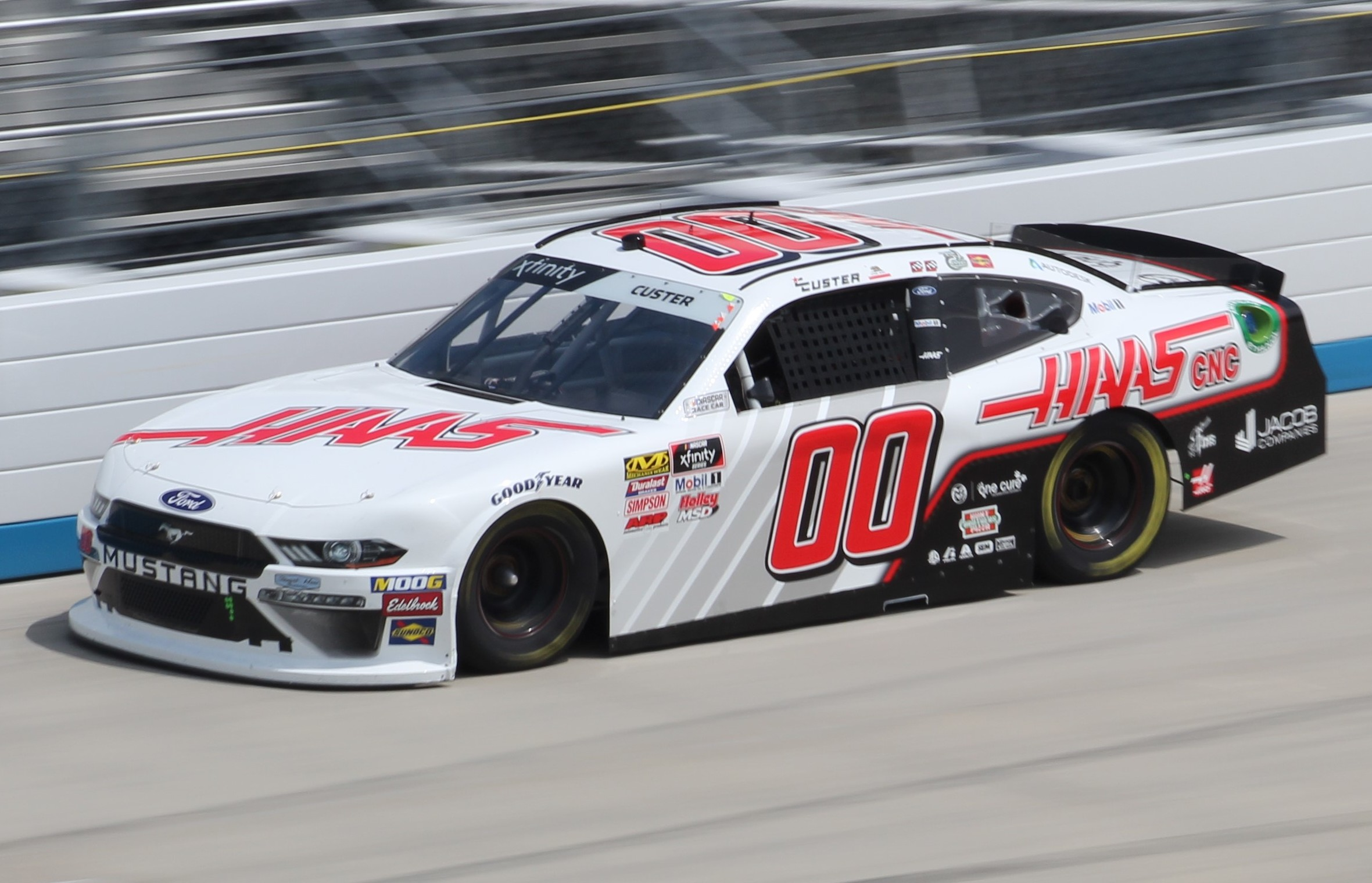
Cole Custer in the No. 00 at Dover International Speedway in 2019

Cole Custer (2017–2019, 2023–2024)

On July 25, 2016, Stewart–Haas announced plans to open its Xfinity Series program starting in 2017. On September 16, 2016, the team announced that Camping World Truck Series driver Cole Custer would drive the car in 2017, with Haas Automation as the primary sponsor and crew chief Jeff Meendering. At the 2017 Ford EcoBoost 300, Custer led almost every lap, won Stage 1 and 2, and earned Stewart–Haas Racing their second career Xfinity win. In 2018, Cole Custer had six poles and one race win. Custer made the final four in the championship playoffs after winning at Texas Motor Speedway on a last-lap battle with Tyler Reddick, who would later beat Custer for the championship.

In 2019, Custer won seven races, and five poles, and finished second again to Reddick at Homestead and in the final points standings. Following the end of the season, Custer was promoted to the Cup Series, and the team's resources were directed to the No. 98.

On November 16, 2022, it was announced that Ryan Preece would replace Custer in the No. 41 in the Cup Series, as Custer would move back to the Xfinity series to drive the No. 00 full-time for Stewart–Haas Racing. Custer started the 2023 season with a ninth-place finish at Daytona. He scored his first win of the season at Portland. Custer also won at a rain-shortened Chicago street race. Following the Michigan race, the No. 00 was docked 20 driver and owner points and five playoff points, and crew chief Jonathan Toney was fined US$25,000 after the post-race inspection revealed unapproved splitters. Custer won at Phoenix and claimed his first Xfinity Series championship.

Custer started the 2024 season with a 13th place finish at Daytona. He scored wins at Pocono and Bristol, as well as the regular season championship. Despite not winning a race during the playoffs, Custer stayed consistent enough to make the Championship 4.

==== Car No. 00 results ====
Year	Team	No.	Make	1	2	3	4	5	6	7	8	9	10	11	12	13	14	15	16	17	18	19	20	21	22	23	24	25	26	27	28	29	30	31	32	33	Owners	Pts
2017	Cole Custer	00	Ford	DAY; 37	ATL; 10	LVS; 11	PHO; 21	CAL; 35	TEX; 5	BRI; 32	RCH; 13	TAL; 26	CLT; 7	DOV; 4	POC; 7	MCH; 10	IOW; 24	DAY; 22	KEN; 11	NHA; 9	IND; 5	IOW; 5	GLN; 12	MOH; 35	BRI; 10	ROA; 8	DAR; 9	RCH; 14	CHI; 7	KEN; 5	DOV; 8	CLT; 6	KAN; 19	TEX; 5	PHO; 7	HOM; 1*	13th	2288
2018	Cole Custer	00	Ford	DAY; 14	ATL; 39	LVS; 9	PHO; 8	CAL; 6	TEX; 4	BRI; 8	RCH; 6	TAL; 9	DOV; 13	CLT; 2	POC; 5	MCH; 3	IOW; 4	CHI; 3	DAY; 25	KEN; 5	NHA; 9	IOW; 9*	GLN; 6	MOH; 7	BRI; 4	ROA; 4	DAR; 2	IND; 29	LVS; 3	RCH; 15	CLT; 7	DOV; 2	KAN; 26	TEX; 1	PHO; 8	HOM; 2*	1st	4035
2019	Cole Custer	00	Ford	DAY; 14	ATL; 2	LVS; 9	PHO; 4	CAL; 1	TEX; 34	BRI; 3	RCH; 1*	TAL; 32	DOV; 4*	CLT; 24	POC; 1*	MCH; 12	IOW; 2	CHI; 1*	DAY; 26	KEN; 1*	NHA; 2	IOW; 29	GLN; 7	MOH; 8	BRI; 22	ROA; 10	DAR; 1	IND; 7	LVS; 4	RCH; 3	CLT; 8	DOV; 1	KAN; 11*	TEX; 8	PHO; 2	HOM; 2	2nd	4035
2023	Cole Custer	00	Ford	DAY; 9	CAL; 27	LVS; 12	PHO; 12	ATL; 12	COA; 32	RCH; 5	MAR; 3	TAL; 4	DOV; 7	DAR; 3	CLT; 3	PIR; 1	SON; 6	NSH; 9	CSC; 1	ATL; 3	NHA; 22	POC; 33	ROA; 30	MCH; 16	IRC; 6	GLN; 7	DAY; 5	DAR; 4	KAN; 36	BRI; 4	TEX; 6	ROV; 2	LVS; 3	HOM; 13*	MAR; 19	PHO; 1*	1st	4040
2024	Cole Custer	00	Ford	DAY; 13	ATL; 16	LVS; 2	PHO; 5	COA; 4	RCH; 10	MAR; 8	TEX; 5	TAL; 10	DOV; 5	DAR; 3	CLT; 32	PIR; 6	SON; 9	IOW; 6	NHA; 3*	NSH; 9	CSC; 18	POC; 1	IND; 2*	MCH; 30	DAY; 32	DAR; 2	ATL; 31	GLN; 21	BRI; 1*	KAN; 2	TAL; 26	ROV; 13	LVS; 8	HOM; 2	MAR; 4	PHO; 8	6th	2292

=== Car No. 98 history ===
Part-time (2017–2018)

It was announced that Kevin Harvick would run six races in a second Stewart–Haas car, the No. 41 Mustang, in 2017, starting with the March 4 race at Atlanta Motor Speedway. Hunt Brothers Pizza was announced to be the primary sponsor for four of the six races, with Bad Boy Buggies being the sponsor for Atlanta, and FIELDS Inc. the sponsor for Watkins Glen International. Harvick did not win in the car but had a best finish of second at Charlotte.

In 2018, SHR partnered with Biagi-DenBeste Racing to field Biagi's No. 98 car for Harvick, Almirola, and Chase Briscoe. On February 24, Harvick scored the first win for the team under the merger at Atlanta Motor Speedway. On September 29, Briscoe won the inaugural Charlotte Roval race, which also was his first career Xfinity Series win.

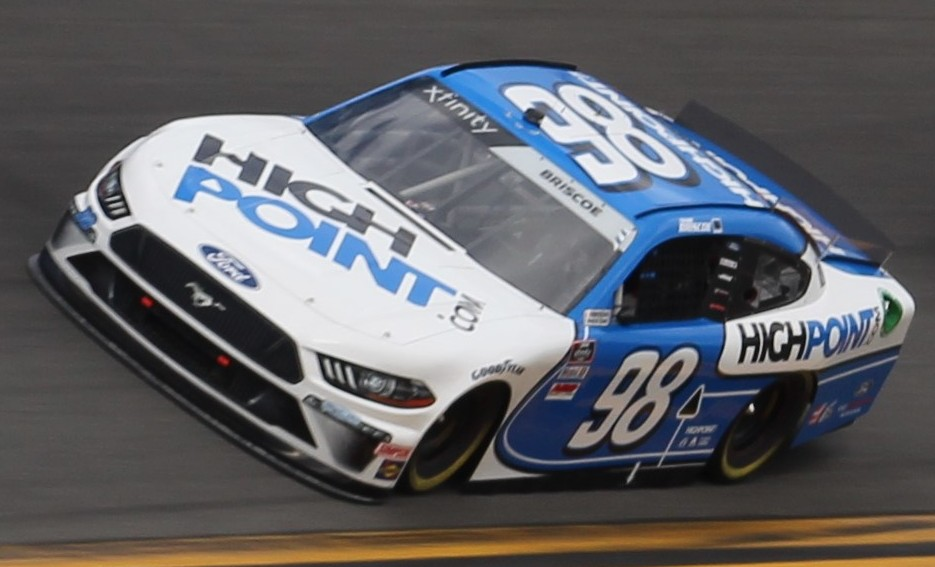
Chase Briscoe's No. 98 car at Daytona in 2020

Chase Briscoe (2019–2020)

Briscoe and the team would run full-time for the 2019 season. Briscoe would score his second career Xfinity Series win at Iowa Speedway. Briscoe returned full-time to the #98 for the 2020 season when HighPoint announced it would be the primary sponsor of Briscoe and the No. 98 Xfinity Series team of Stewart–Haas Racing. Briscoe went on to have a career year with a season leading 9 wins, making him the obvious choice to replace the retiring Clint Bowyer in the No. 14 Ford Mustang in 2021. The iconic blue-and-white colors of HighPoint that emblazoned Briscoe in 2020 remain with him in 2021.

Riley Herbst (2021–2024)

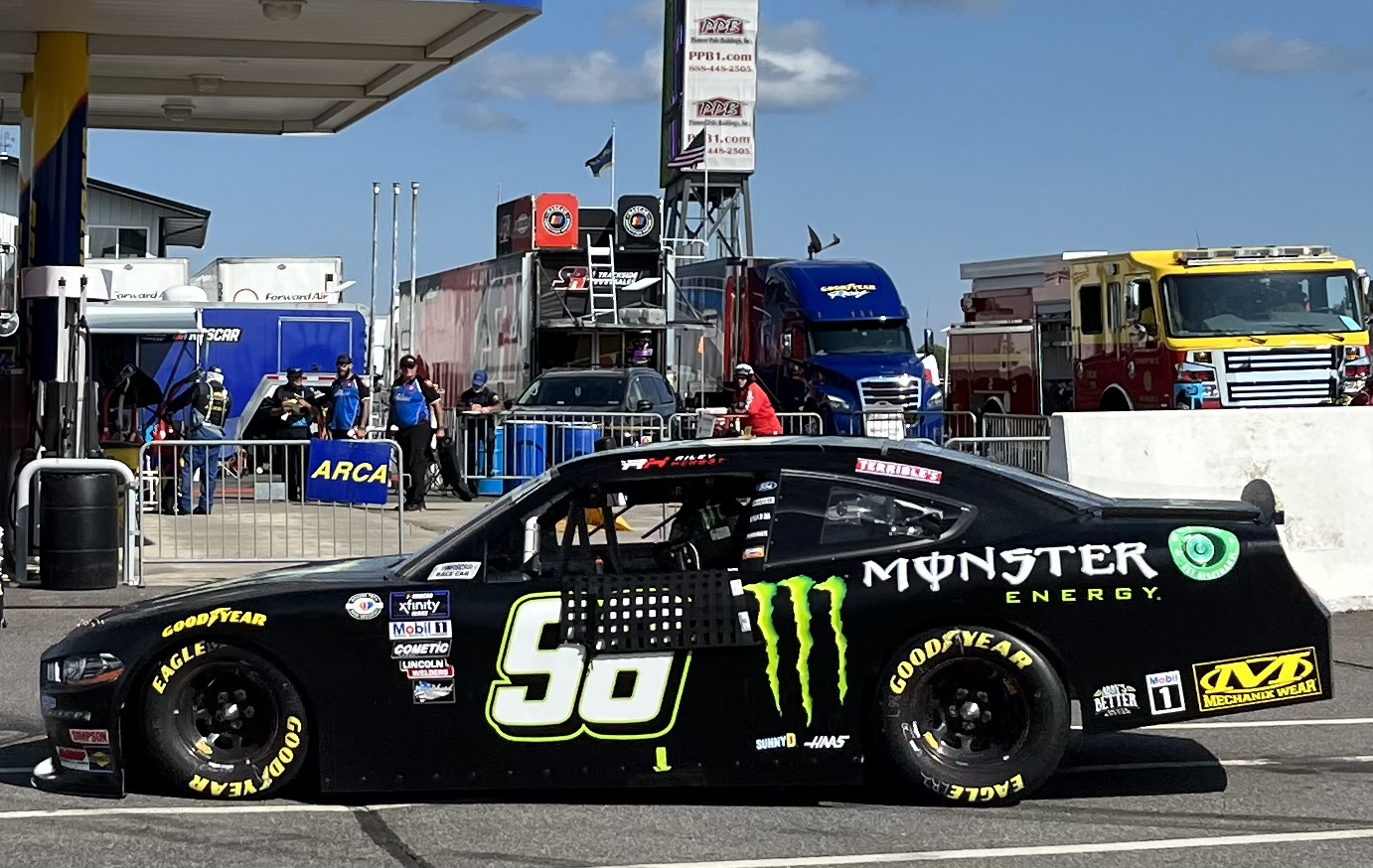
Riley Herbst at Pocono in 2023

With Briscoe moving up to the Cup Series, SHR signed Riley Herbst to drive the No. 98 in 2021. During the 2023 season, Herbst scored his first career win at Las Vegas. He finished 13th in the points standings.

Herbst started the 2024 season with a sixth place finish at Daytona. He scored his first win of the season at Indianapolis. This was also the first 1-2 finish for the team's Xfinity Series program as Custer finished second to Herbst. At Phoenix, Herbst gave Stewart–Haas Racing its final race win; he finished seventh in the points standings.

==== Car No. 98 results ====
Year	Team	No.	Make	1	2	3	4	5	6	7	8	9	10	11	12	13	14	15	16	17	18	19	20	21	22	23	24	25	26	27	28	29	30	31	32	33	Owners	Pts
2017	Kevin Harvick	41	Ford	DAY	ATL; 4*	LVS	PHO	CAL	TEX; 3	BRI	RCH	TAL	CLT; 2	DOV	POC	MCH	IOW	DAY	KEN; 4	NHA	IND	IOW	GLN; 6	MOH	BRI	ROA	DAR; 3	RCH	CHI	KEN	DOV	CLT	KAN	TEX	PHO	HOM	95th	0^{1}
2018	Aric Almirola	98	Ford	DAY; 35																			GLN; 5	MOH	BRI	ROA											24th	334
2018	Kevin Harvick	98	Ford		ATL; 1*	LVS	PHO	CAL	TEX; 19							MCH; 8	IOW	CHI; 2	DAY	KEN	NHA	IOW					DAR; 29	IND	LVS	RCH							24th	334
2018	Chase Briscoe	98	Ford							BRI; 23	RCH	TAL; 16	DOV	CLT; 11	POC																CLT; 1*	DOV	KAN; 30	TEX	PHO	HOM	24th	334
2019	Chase Briscoe	98	Ford	DAY; 12	ATL; 15	LVS; 8	PHO; 6	CAL; 5	TEX; 4	BRI; 4	RCH; 8	TAL; 4	DOV; 5	CLT; 19	POC; 3	MCH; 7	IOW; 7	CHI; 15	DAY; 35	KEN; 5	NHA; 6	IOW; 1	GLN; 6	MOH; 7	BRI; 2	ROA; 7	DAR; 6	IND; 8	LVS; 11	RCH; 5	CLT; 9*	DOV; 5*	KAN; 3	TEX; 22	PHO; 8	HOM; 3	5th	2302
2020	Chase Briscoe	98	Ford	DAY; 5	LVS; 1*	CAL; 19	PHO; 6	DAR; 1	CLT; 20	BRI; 2	ATL; 9	HOM; 7	HOM; 1	TAL; 18	POC; 1	IND; 1*	KEN; 4	KEN; 2	TEX; 2	KAN; 14	ROA; 3	DAY; 29*	DOV; 10	DOV; 1*	DAY; 3	DAR; 11*	RCH; 11	RCH; 16	BRI; 1	LVS; 1*	TAL; 19*	CLT; 18*	KAN; 1*	TEX; 24	MAR; 7	PHO; 9	4th	4028
2021	Riley Herbst	98	Ford	DAY; 26	DAY; 39	HOM; 11	LVS; 40	PHO; 4	ATL; 6	MAR; 29	TAL; 4	DAR; 28	DOV; 17	COA; 16	CLT; 12	MOH; 21	TEX; 12	NSH; 10	POC; 35	ROA; 7	ATL; 19	NHA; 10	GLN; 13	IND; 8	MCH; 7	DAY; 10	DAR; 38	RCH; 5	BRI; 3	LVS; 33	TAL; 27*	CLT; 34	TEX; 12	KAN; 13	MAR; 10	PHO; 4	11th	2157
2022	Riley Herbst	98	Ford	DAY; 4	CAL; 9	LVS; 14	PHO; 38	ATL; 4	COA; 26	RCH; 5	MAR; 6	TAL; 7	DOV; 9	DAR; 3	TEX; 8	CLT; 25	PIR; 35	NSH; 3	ROA; 7	ATL; 9	NHA; 30	POC; 12	IND; 6	MCH; 9	GLN; 7	DAY; 15	DAR; 34	KAN; 16	BRI; 5	TEX; 5	TAL; 11	CLT; 32	LVS; 18	HOM; 8	MAR; 3	PHO; 7	11th	2197
2023	Riley Herbst	98	Ford	DAY; 6	CAL; 7	LVS; 8	PHO; 4	ATL; 5	COA; 10	RCH; 23	MAR; 30	TAL; 23	DOV; 21	DAR; 38	CLT; 14	PIR; 32	SON; 15	NSH; 2	CSC; 24	ATL; 36	NHA; 20	POC; 4	ROA; 5	MCH; 6	IRC; 12	GLN; 35	DAY; 24	DAR; 6	KAN; 23	BRI; 8	TEX; 37	ROV; 4	LVS; 1*	HOM; 2	MAR; 4	PHO; 4	13th	904
2024	Riley Herbst	98	Ford	DAY; 6	ATL; 15	LVS; 5	PHO; 24	COA; 34	RCH; 13	MAR; 25	TEX; 27	TAL; 2	DOV; 16	DAR; 7	CLT; 38	PIR; 10	SON; 13	IOW; 2	NHA; 8	NSH; 6	CSC; 28	POC; 11	IND; 1	MCH; 38	DAY; 4	DAR; 35	ATL; 26	GLN; 13	BRI; 13	KAN; 10	TAL; 3	ROV; 32	LVS; 7	HOM; 6	MAR; 11	PHO; 1*	8th	2253

== Camping World Truck Series and driver development ==
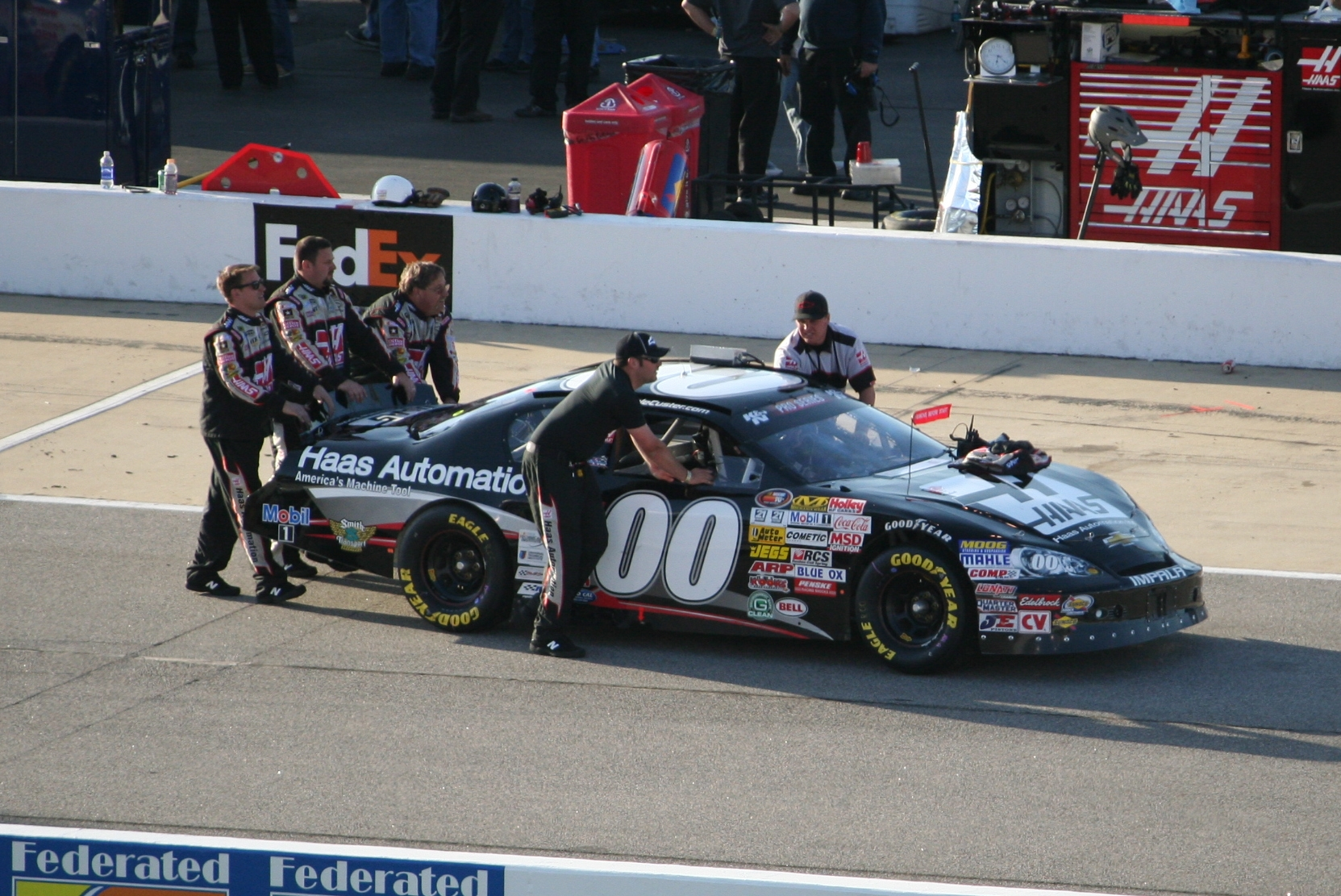
Cole Custer running in the K&N Pro Series at RIR in 2013.

The team had an agreement for Camping World Truck Series team MRD Motorsports to be the driver development team for Haas CNC Racing which Blake Bjorklund was named the driver for the 2007 season. Bjorklund was originally scheduled to drive 12 races for MRD but ran most of the schedule before being replaced by Chad McCumbee.

=== Truck No. 00 history ===
In 2014, 16-year-old Cole Custer, son of longtime SHR executive Joe Custer, ran the No. 00 Haas Automation Silverado in the Camping World Truck Series with the team, branded Haas Racing Development, for 9 races with trucks coming from Turner Scott Motorsports and engines from Hendrick Motorsports. Custer had finished 8th in the K&N Pro Series East standings in 2013 driving for Ken Schrader with sponsorship from Haas, including two wins at Iowa and Loudon. Custer made his truck debut at Martinsville Speedway, finishing 12th.

Custer became the youngest pole winner in Truck Series history, earning the top starting spot in his third start at Gateway Motorsports Park. He finished 6th in the race. Custer later won the pole at New Hampshire and would go on to win the race from the pole, becoming the youngest driver to win a Truck Series race. With the win, Gene Haas joined a select club of owners who have won as an owner in all three national touring series, joining Rick Hendrick, Richard Childress, Jack Roush, Bill Davis and Dale Earnhardt.

Custer and the No. 00 team moved to JR Motorsports in 2015, although remaining a part of the Haas stable, the Haas truck team was shut down.

==== Truck No. 00 results ====
Year	Team	No.	Make	1	2	3	4	5	6	7	8	9	10	11	12	13	14	15	16	17	18	19	20	21	22	Owners	Pts
2014	Cole Custer	00	Chevy	DAY	MAR; 12	KAN	CLT	DOV; 14	TEX	GTW; 6	KEN	IOW; 8	ELD	POC	MCH	BRI; 8	MSP; 9	CHI	NHA; 1*	LVS	TAL	MAR; 29	TEX	PHO; 3	HOM		

== ARCA Menards Series ==
=== Car No. 14 history ===
In 2021, The team field the No. 14 ford for Chase Briscoe at Watkins Glen.

==== Car No. 14 results ====
Year	Driver	No.	Make	1	2	3	4	5	6	7	8	9	10	11	12	13	14	15	16	17	18	19	20	AMSC	Pts	Ref
2021	Chase Briscoe	14	Ford	DAY	PHO	TAL	KAN	TOL	CLT	MOH	POC	ELK	BLN	IOW	WIN	GLN; 23	MCH	ISF	MLW	DSF	BRI	SLM	KAN	109th	22	

=== Car No. 9 history ===
In 2023, The team fielded the No. 9 Bonanza Wines Ford for Ryan Preece at Sonoma Raceway. Preece won the race from the pole. He led 50 of 64 laps.

==== Car No. 9 results ====
Year	Driver	No.	Make	1	2	3	4	5	6	7	8	9	10	11	12	AMSWC	Pts	Ref
2023	Ryan Preece	9	Ford	PHO	IRW	KCR	PIR	SON; 1*	IRW	SHA	EVG	AAS	LVS	MAD	PHO	36th	49	

=== Car No. 14 history ===
In 2021, The team fielded the No. 14 Ford for Chase Briscoe at Sonoma Raceway in preparation for the Cup race at the track. Briscoe won the race.

==== Car No. 14 results ====
Year	Driver	No.	Make	1	2	3	4	5	6	7	8	9	AMSWC	Pts	Ref
2021	Chase Briscoe	14	Ford	PHO	SON; 1**	IRW	CNS	IRW	PIR	LVS	AAS	PHO	34th	48	

=== Car No. 41 history ===
Stewart–Haas Racing made their K&N Pro Series debut at the 2018 Carneros 200 at Sonoma Raceway. Aric Almirola drove the No. 41 Ford in preparation for the Cup race at the track the following day.

==== Car No. 41 results ====
Year	Driver	No.	Make	1	2	3	4	5	6	7	8	9	10	11	12	13	14	AMSWC	Pts	Ref
2018	Aric Almirola	41	Ford	KCR	TUS	TUS	OSS	CNS	SON; 2	DCS	IOW	EVG	GTW	LVS	MER	AAS	KCR	30th	43	

== eNASCAR iRacing World Championship Series ==
Stewart–Haas Gaming made history by winning the inaugural eNASCAR Heat Pro League Championship in 2019. For the 2020 eNASCAR iRacing World Championship Series, the team was rebranded as Stewart–Haas eSports.
