= Daniel Hemric =

American racing driver (born 1991)

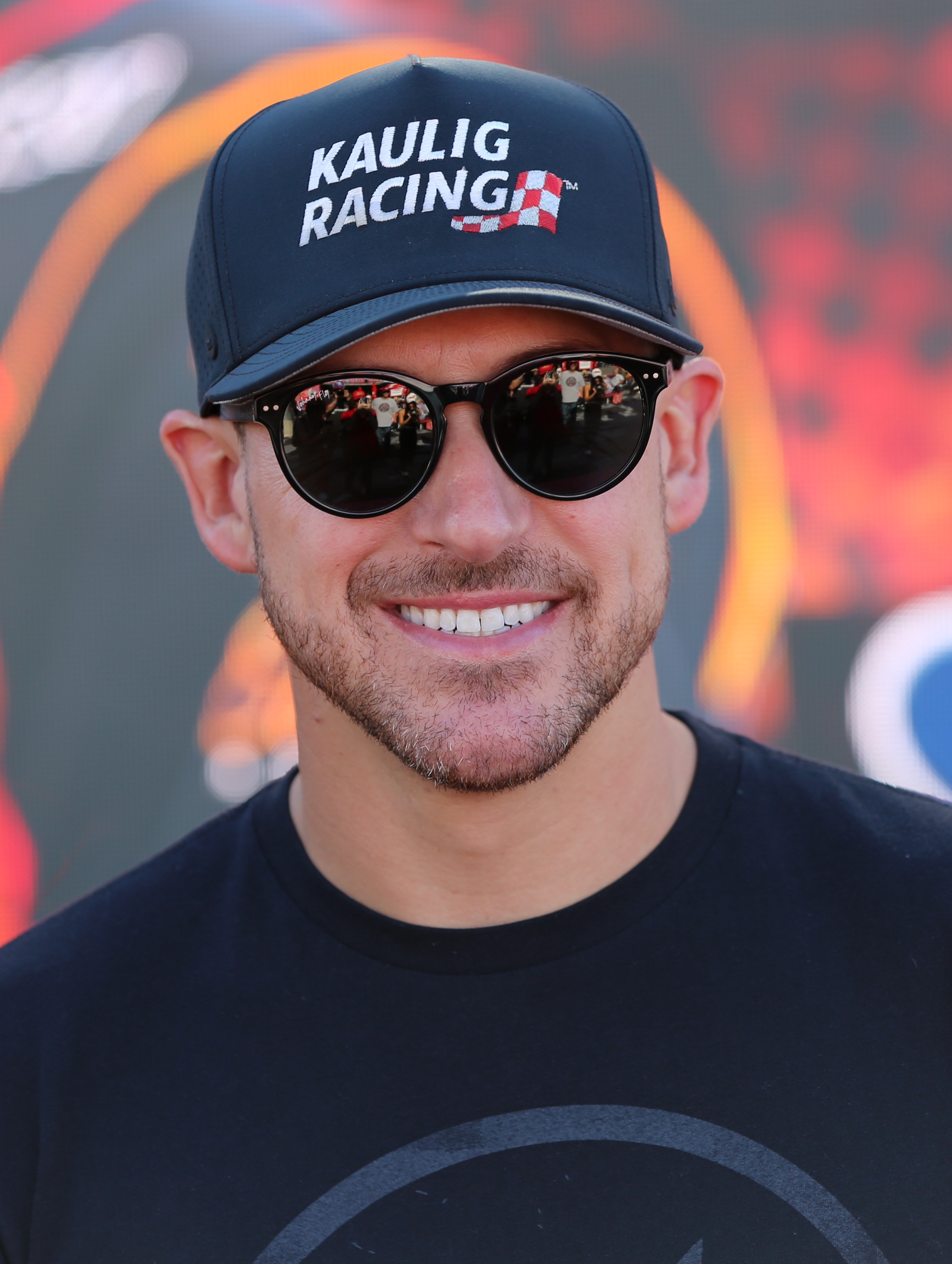
- Hemric at Las Vegas Motor Speedway in 2025
- Born: Daniel Brian Hemric; January 27, 1991 (age 35); Kannapolis, North Carolina, U.S.
- Achievements: 2021 NASCAR Xfinity Series Champion; 2015 All American 400 Winner; 2014 RedBud 300 Winner; 2013 Southern Super Series Champion; 2013 Blizzard Series Champion; 2012 JEGS/CRA All-Stars Tour Champion; 2010 Legends Million Winner (inaugural race)
- Awards: 2019 Monster Energy NASCAR Cup Series Rookie of the Year

NASCAR Cup Series career
- 83 races run over 4 years
- 2024 position: 29th
- Best finish: 25th (2019)
- First race: 2018 Toyota Owners 400 (Richmond)
- Last race: 2024 NASCAR Cup Series Championship Race (Phoenix)
Wins	Top tens	Poles
0	7	1

NASCAR O'Reilly Auto Parts Series career
- 189 races run over 7 years
- 2025 position: 86th
- Best finish: 1st (2021)
- First race: 2017 PowerShares QQQ 300 (Daytona)
- Last race: 2025 Focused Health 302 (Las Vegas)
- First win: 2021 NASCAR Xfinity Series Championship Race (Phoenix)
Wins	Top tens	Poles
1	105	7

NASCAR FedEx Freight Truck Series career
- 100 races run over 6 years
- Truck no., team: No. 19 (McAnally–Hilgemann Racing)
- 2026 position: 7th
- Best finish: 6th (2016)
- First race: 2013 Kroger 200 (Martinsville)
- Last race: 2026 Craftsman 200 (Homestead)
- First win: 2025 Boys & Girls Club of the Blue Ridge 200 (Martinsville)
Wins	Top tens	Poles
1	57	0

ARCA Menards Series career
- 1 race run over 1 year
- Best finish: 103rd (2015)
- First race: 2015 Lucas Oil 200 (Daytona)
Wins	Top tens	Poles
0	0	0

ARCA Menards Series East career
- 3 races run over 1 year
- Best finish: 27th (2015)
- First race: 2015 Kevin Whitaker Chevrolet 150 (Greenville-Pickens)
- Last race: 2015 Bully Hill Vineyards 125 (Watkins Glen)
Wins	Top tens	Poles
0	3	1

ARCA Menards Series West career
- 2 races run over 2 years
- Best finish: 36th (2019)
- First race: 2019 Procore 200 (Sonoma)
- Last race: 2025 West Coast Stock Car Motorsports Hall of Fame 150 (Bakersfield)
Wins	Top tens	Poles
0	2	1
- Statistics up to date as of November 6, 2026.

Daniel Brian Hemric (born January 27, 1991) is an American professional stock car racing driver. He competes full-time in the NASCAR Truck Series, driving the No. 19 Chevrolet Silverado RST for McAnally–Hilgemann Racing.

After beginning his career in short-track racing, Hemric moved up to the NASCAR Camping World Truck Series and raced full-time in the series in 2015 and 2016 for Brad Keselowski Racing. He ran two full seasons in the NASCAR Xfinity Series for Richard Childress Racing, reaching the Championship Round of the NASCAR playoffs in both years, before competing in the Monster Energy NASCAR Cup Series for the team in 2019. Following one Cup season, he lost his ride with RCR and joined JR Motorsports for a part-time Xfinity schedule. In 2021, Hemric joined Joe Gibbs Racing and won his first career NASCAR race and the Xfinity Series championship.

== Racing career ==
=== Early career ===
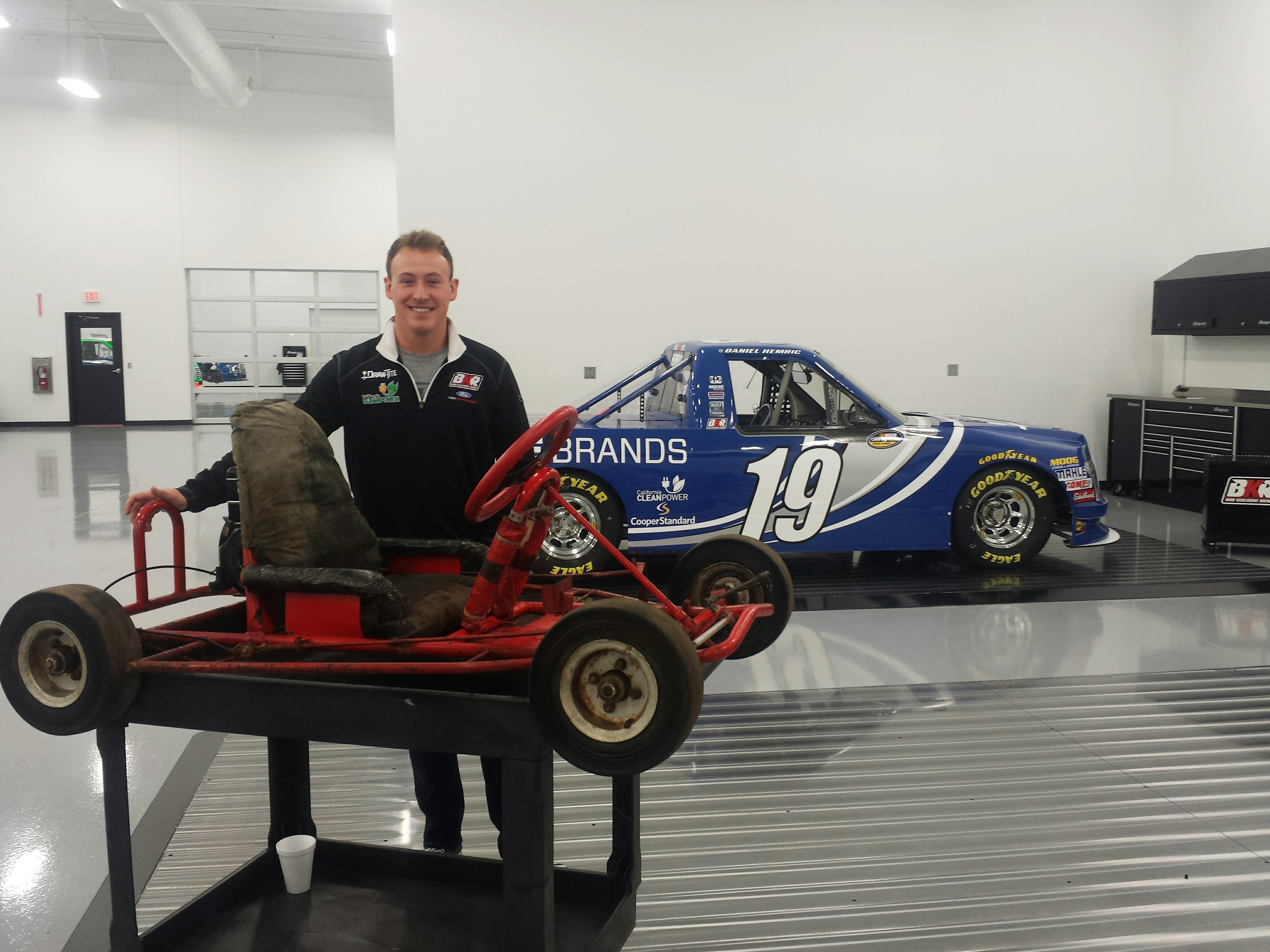
Hemric stands with his first go-kart at the Brad Keselowski Racing shop in Statesville, NC

A native of Kannapolis, North Carolina, Hemric began his career at the age of five, competing in go-kart racing at the 1/5-mile Concord Speedway, winning eleven races and a track championship at the North Carolina facility before moving up to Bandolero car five years later. During that time, he started doing his backflip celebration, which was taken from Carl Edwards. At the age of sixteen, Hemric moved up to Legends cars, and in 2008, he won the track's Pro championship, as well as the first of two back-to-back Legends Pro national championships. In 2009, with nearly sixty wins in just under eighty starts, he maxed out his National Points early on the way to winning his second national Legends Pro championship, in addition to earning the Summer Shootout Series championship on the strength of six wins in ten starts. In 2010, Hemric won the Legends Million at Charlotte Motor Speedway, winning the largest paycheck in Legends car history, $250,000.

Late in the 2010 racing season, Hemric made his debut in the NASCAR Whelen Southern Modified Tour; he would run selected races in that series and in the Whelen Modified Tour over the next three years, while in 2012 he ran a full season in late model cars, winning the Champion Racing Association JEGS/CRA All-Stars Tour championship, scoring eight victories on his way to the title. Hemric won the Summer Shootout Series championship again in 2013, in addition to competing in the Southern Super Series late model championship, driving the No. 98 Ford for Carswell Motorsports. He also competed in the Blizzard Series late model tour, winning the series' 2013 championship.

=== NASCAR Craftsman Truck Series ===
==== 2013-2014: First appearances ====
In October 2013, Hemric made his debut in NASCAR national series competition at Martinsville Speedway, driving the No. 6 Chevrolet for Sharp Gallaher Racing in the Camping World Truck Series. He suffered early issues, finishing 32nd. He finished thirteenth in his second Truck Series race, at Phoenix International Raceway. Hemric made his third Truck start in 2014 for NTS Motorsports, finishing a solid twelfth at Homestead.

==== 2015: Full-time for NTS Motorsports ====
In 2015, Hemric announced that he would compete full-time for the first time in the NASCAR Camping World Truck Series with NTS Motorsports. Hemric drove the No. 14 California Clean Power Chevrolet Silverado and competed for the 2015 NASCAR Rookie of the Year title. Hemric earned a best finish of fourth (Dover International Speedway, Bristol Motor Speedway, Canadian Tire Motorsport Park) and ran as high as fifth in the NCWTS Driver Point Standings, ultimately finishing the season seventh in the championship standings.

==== 2016: Switch to Brad Keselowski Racing ====
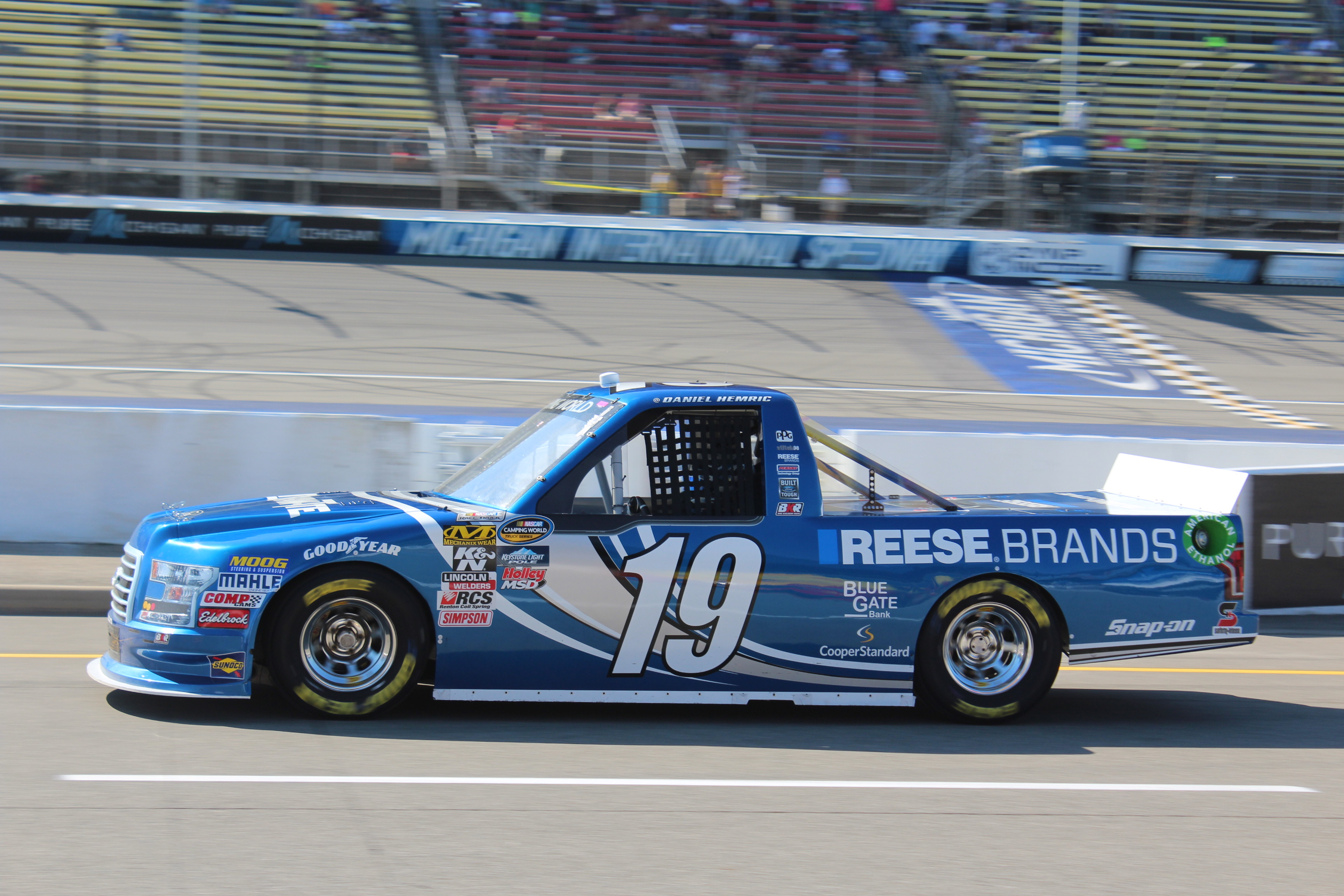
Hemric's No. 19 Reese Brands F-150 during practice for the 2016 Careers for Veterans 200 at Michigan International Speedway.

On November 3, Hemric announced that he would join Brad Keselowski Racing to drive the No. 19 Ford F-Series in 2016. Hemric started the season with an eighth place finish at Daytona. He then went on to earn seventeen top-five finishes but no wins. Hemric would make the Chase after being the highest non-winner in the points.

==== 2018: One-off appearance ====
In 2018, Hemric made a return to the Truck Series, running a one-off race for Young's Motorsports at Charlotte Motor Speedway, where he started sixteenth and finished 21st.

==== 2025–present: McAnally–Hilgemann Racing ====
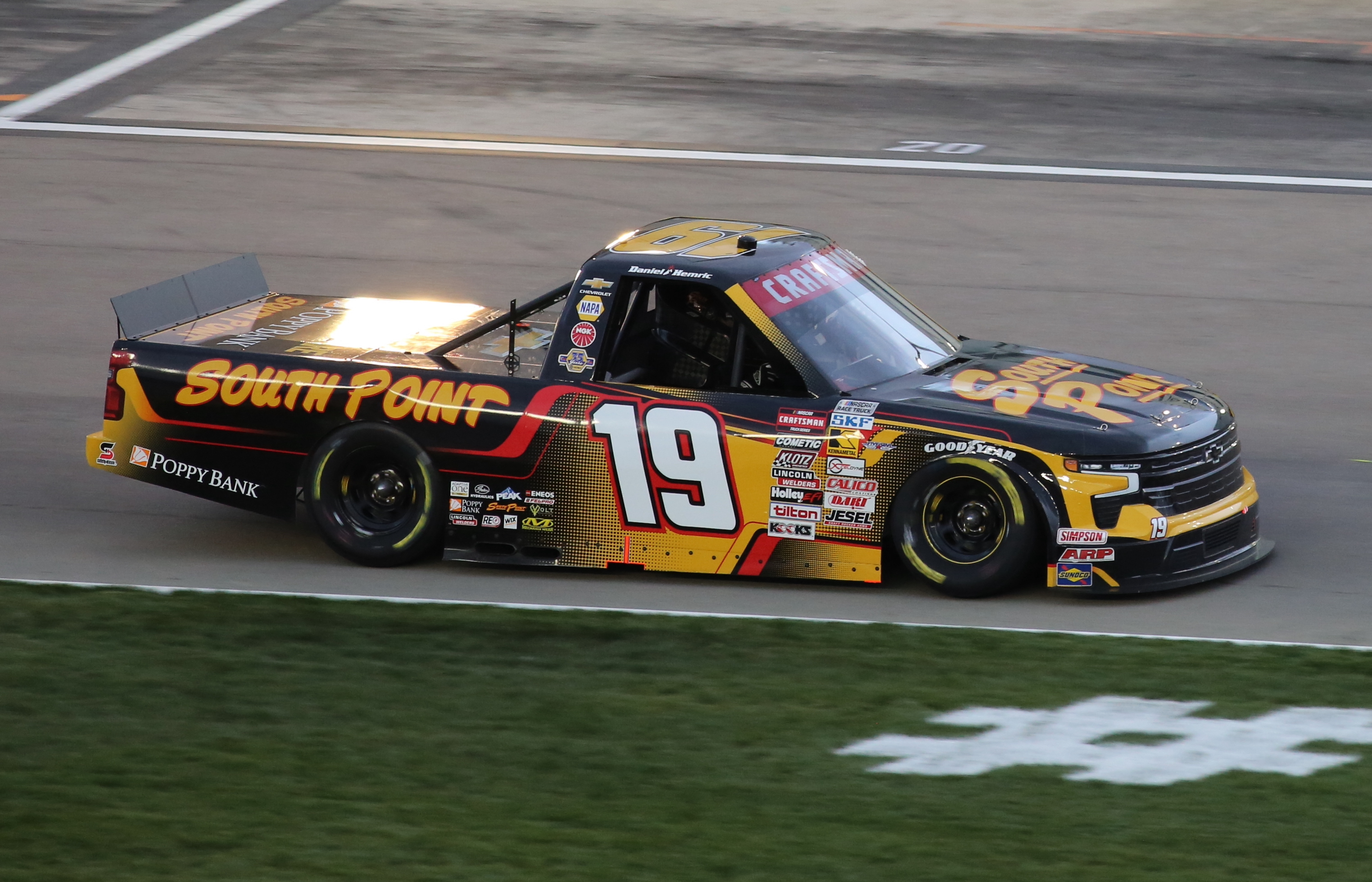
Hemric's No. 19 truck at Las Vegas Motor Speedway in 2025

On November 20, 2024, it was announced that Hemric will return to the Truck Series full-time in 2025, driving the No. 19 Chevrolet for McAnally–Hilgemann Racing and replacing Christian Eckes, who moved up to the Xfinity Series.

Hemric started the 2025 season with a seventh-place finish at Daytona. Over a month later, he scored his first career Truck Series victory at Martinsville after passing teammate, Tyler Ankrum, for the lead with three laps to go. He ended the season ninth in points.

Hemric on pit road during practice for the 2026 Zero Carbon Bioethanol 150 at Phoenix Raceway

Hemric began his 2026 season with a 16th-place finish at Daytona.

On November 3, 2026, it was announced that Hemric will return to MHR in 2027.

=== NASCAR Xfinity Series ===
==== 2017: Full-time for Richard Childress Racing ====
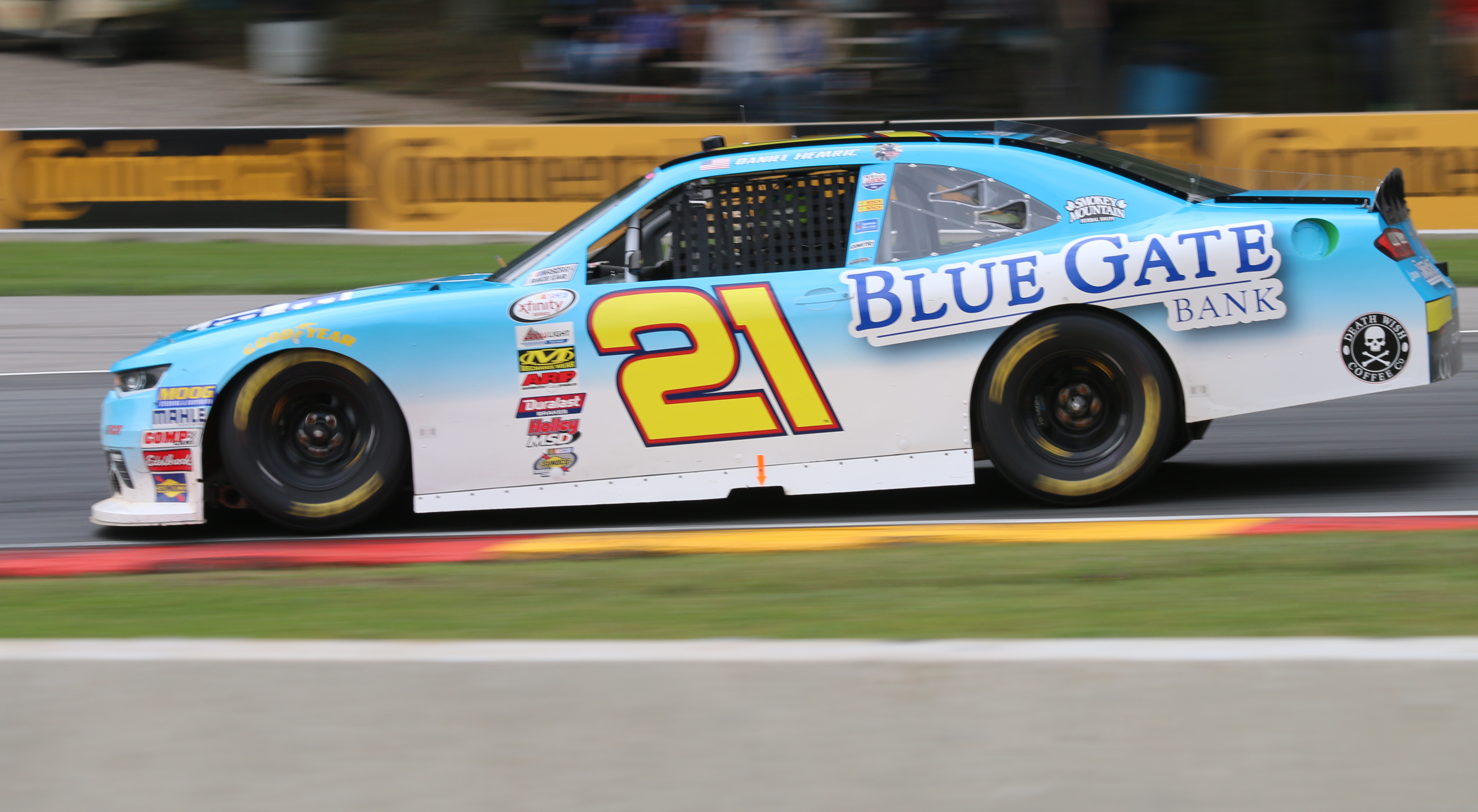
Hemric's No. 21 Childress car at Road America in 2017

On September 17, 2016, it was announced that Hemric would join Richard Childress Racing in 2017. Hemric ran the full Xfinity Series schedule and competed for Rookie of the Year, driving the No. 21 Chevy Camaro. Hemric made his Xfinity debut at Daytona, where he finished 31st after being caught up in an early crash. He rebounded the next week at Atlanta, finishing ninth for his first career Xfinity top-ten finish. At Bristol, Hemric won the Dash 4 Cash. At Richmond, he won his first career pole and then scored a career-best third-place finish. At Mid-Ohio, Hemric would run in the top five for most of the day, bringing home an impressive and career-best second-place finish. In the playoffs, Hemric advanced to the Championship Round at Homestead as the lone non-JR Motorsports driver. Despite starting the race strong, he was eventually plagued by battery issues that dropped him twelve laps behind the leader. He finished 34th and thirteen laps down, fourth in the points.

==== 2020: Part-time with JR Motorsports ====
Hemric returned to the Xfinity Series in 2020, joining JR Motorsports' No. 8 car for a 21-race schedule and sharing the car with Dale Earnhardt Jr. and Jeb Burton. He recorded 12 top tens during the year.

==== 2021: Xfinity Series champion with Joe Gibbs Racing ====
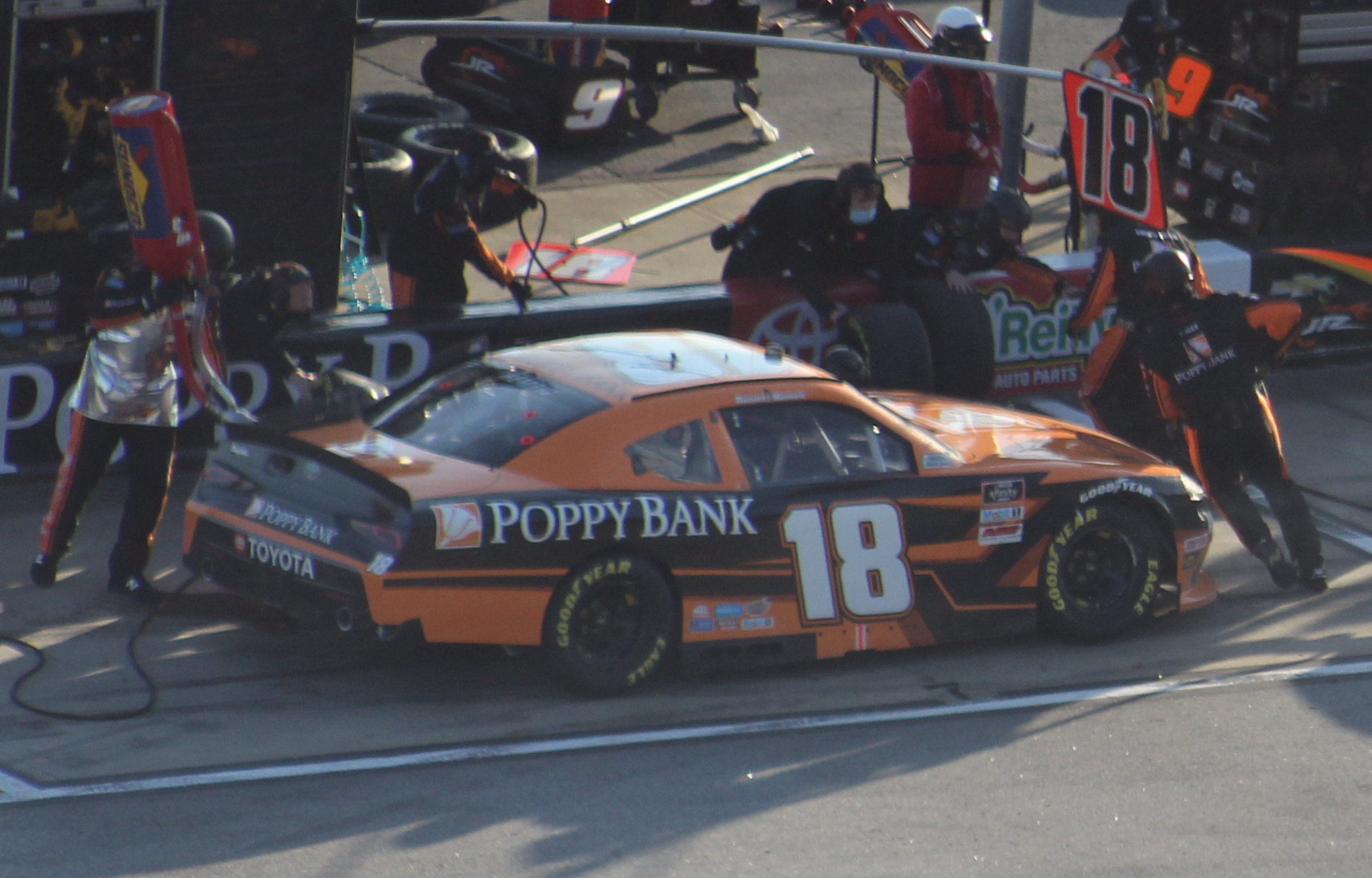
Hemric in the No. 18 at Atlanta Motor Speedway in 2021

Hemric moved to Joe Gibbs Racing's No. 18 Xfinity car for the 2021 season, marking a return to full-time competition. At the end of the Atlanta race, he was involved in a fight with Noah Gragson after a pit road mishap during the race. Neither driver was reprimanded by NASCAR. Despite scoring no wins during the 2021 regular season, Hemric made the Playoffs through his consistency. On September 25, Kaulig Racing announced that Hemric would pilot the No. 11 in 2022, replacing Justin Haley as he moved to Kaulig's No. 31 in the Cup Series full-time.

Thanks to his consistency, Hemric would lock himself into the Championship 4, alongside Austin Cindric, A. J. Allmendinger and Noah Gragson. On November 6, Hemric used a last-lap, overtime pass of Cindric at the season finale at Phoenix Raceway to not only win the first race of his NASCAR career, but also the 2021 Xfinity Series title. Hemric's ten runner-up finishes prior to earning his first win, at the time, tied him with Dale Jarrett for the most in Xfinity Series history.

==== 2022–2025: Kaulig Racing ====
Hemric joined Kaulig Racing for 2022.

Hemric returned to Kaulig for the 2023 season. At the spring Talladega race, he got airborne into turn 3, got ramped up by Riley Herbst, and crashed on top of the wall, even taking out the turn four camera in the process. His car flipped onto its roof and finally got off of the wall heading into the frontstretch off of turn 4. Hemric was uninjured. His flip occurred in the same race as Blaine Perkins. In early September, Hemric would pilot the No. 10 for the rest of the season, starting at Kansas, as the car was in the Owner's Playoffs. Hemric was eliminated at the conclusion of the Charlotte Roval race.

In 2024, at Circuit of the Americas, Hemric practiced and qualified Josh Williams' No. 11 car due to him and his wife being on baby watch. Williams competed in the race.

The next year, after Williams left the team, Hemric filled in the No. 10 at Gateway, Charlotte Roval, and Las Vegas.

=== NASCAR Cup Series ===
==== 2017–2019: Richard Childress Racing ====
In November 2017, Hemric practiced and qualified the No. 27 Monster Energy NASCAR Cup Series car of Richard Childress Racing driver Paul Menard at the AAA Texas 500 weekend, qualifying 21st; Menard was on paternity leave but returned for the race.

Hemric returned to RCR's No. 21 for the 2018 season in addition to a part-time schedule in the Truck Series, driving the No. 20 Chevrolet Silverado for Young's Motorsports. On March 20, 2018, it was announced that Hemric would attempt two races in the 2018 Monster Energy NASCAR Cup Series, the spring Richmond race and the Charlotte Roval race driving the No. 8 RCR Chevrolet. In his Cup debut at the 2018 Toyota Owners 400, he qualified 22nd and finished 32nd, three laps down.

On September 28, 2018, RCR announced that beginning in 2019, Hemric would be the full-time driver of the No. 31 Chevrolet in the Monster Energy NASCAR Cup Series, competing for 2019 Rookie of the Year honors. The agreement came after a deal to drive Leavine Family Racing's No. 95 car in 2019 fell through. Two days later, he drove another Cup race at the new Charlotte Roval, finishing tenth in Stage 2 and running as high as second, but was caught up in a late-race wreck and finished 23rd.

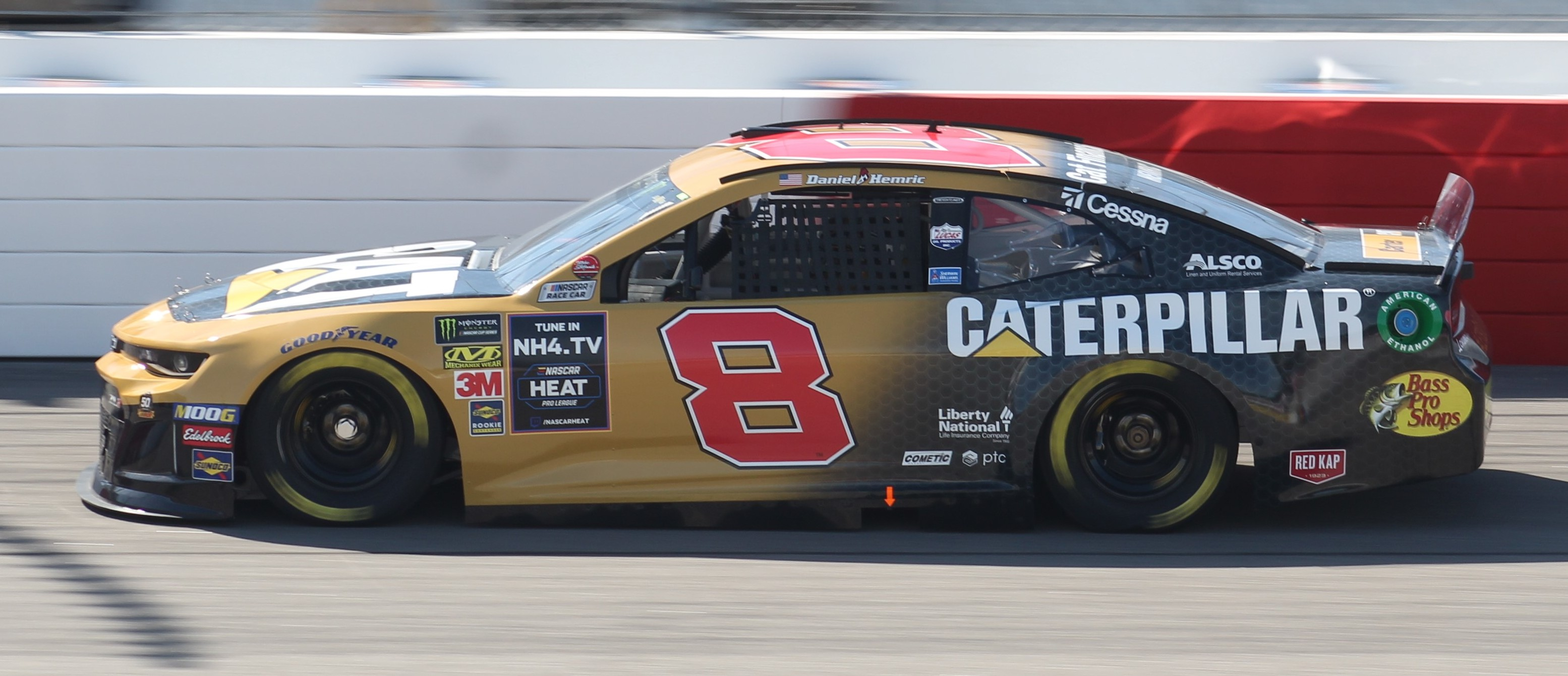
Hemric's No. 8 Cup Series car at Richmond Raceway in 2019

On December 14, 2018, RCR announced that Hemric would be driving the No. 8 car instead of the No. 31 car for the 2019 season. In his first race in the No. 8 at the 2019 Daytona 500, he drove a gold paint scheme to celebrate RCR's 50th Anniversary.

On August 17, 2019, Hemric said he was "iffy" about his status for 2020, despite having signed a two-year contract with RCR. A month later on September 17, the team announced Hemric would be released after the 2019 season. At the October Kansas race, Hemric scored his first career Busch Pole Award. He finished the season 25th in the points standings. Despite a disappointing debut season, Hemric won the 2019 NASCAR Rookie of the Year honors.

==== 2022: Kaulig Racing and 23XI Racing ====
In 2022, Hemric drove the Kaulig Racing No. 16 part-time in the Cup Series, finishing twelfth at the 2022 Daytona 500 and peaking at ninth place at Fontana. On November 6, Hemric filled in for Ty Gibbs in the No. 23 car for 23XI Racing in the 2022 NASCAR Cup Series Championship Race at Phoenix Raceway. Gibbs had to miss the race due to the death of his father Coy Gibbs. Hemric was still at the track after the previous day's Xfinity Series race and was able to be fitted into Gibbs' car seat. This marked Hemric's first race with Toyota in over a year.

==== 2024: Kaulig Racing ====
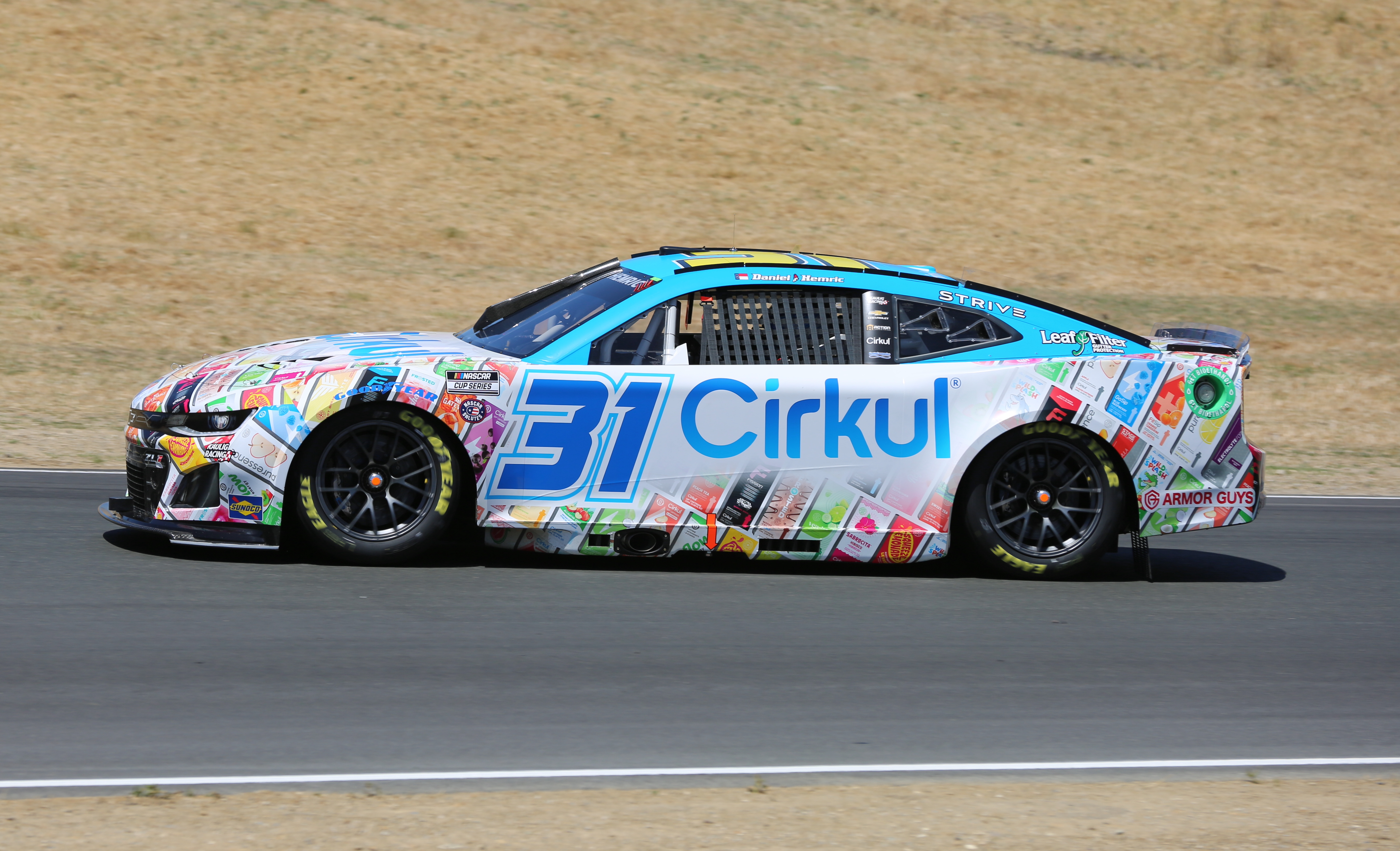
Hemric's No. 31 car at Sonoma Raceway in 2024

On September 15, 2023, Kaulig Racing announced that Hemric would drive the No. 31 in 2024. This marked Hemric's return to full-time Cup Series competition since 2019.

=== Other racing ===
On November 2, 2013, he finished second in the 29th annual All American 400 late model race to Chase Elliott, winning the 2013 Southern Super Series championship by one point over Bubba Pollard.

== Personal life ==
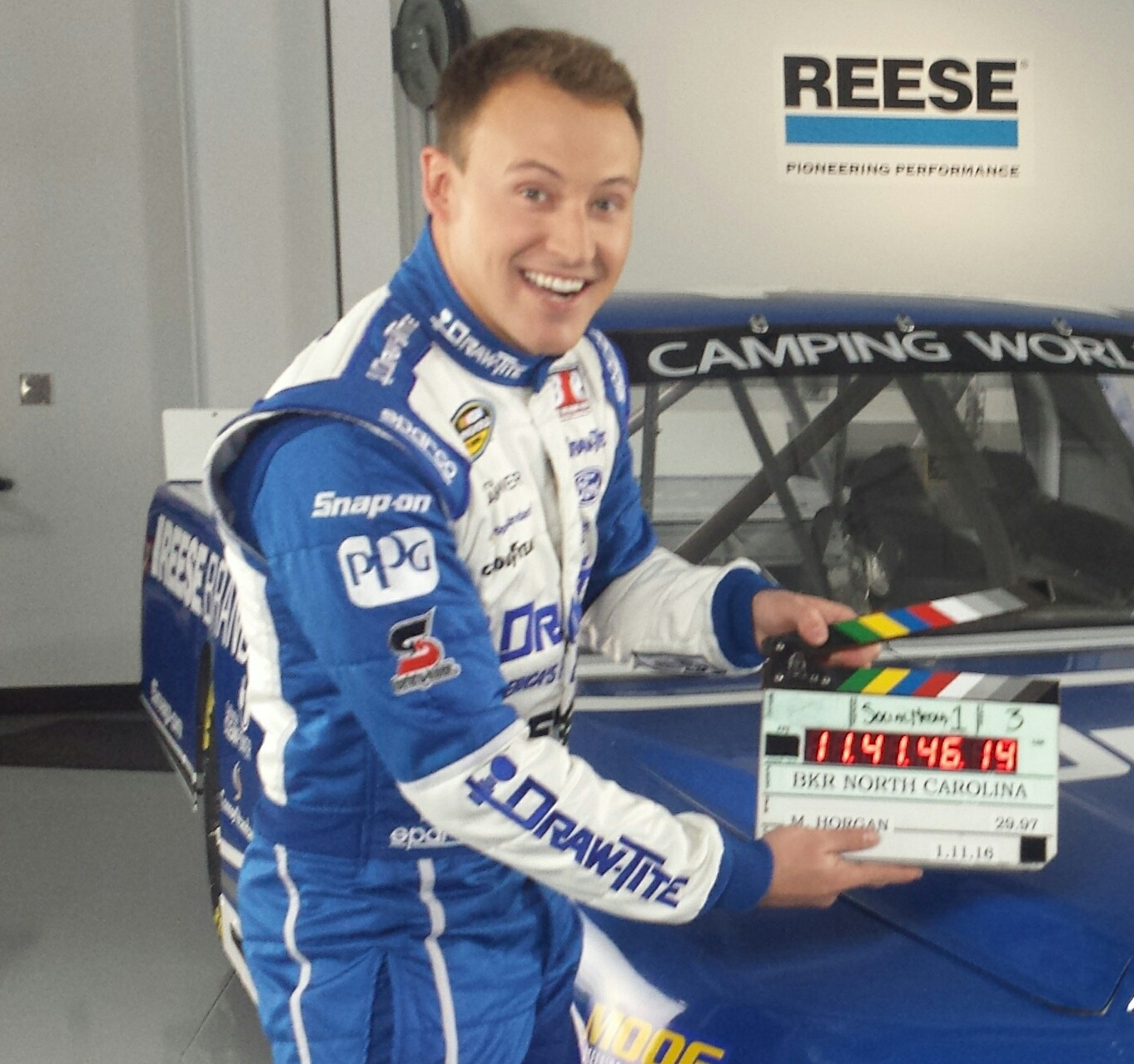
Hemric during the 2016 Media Tour

On July 28, 2015, Hemric announced his engagement to K&N Pro Series East driver Kenzie Ruston. They married on January 7, 2017. He announced in November 2019 that Ruston was expecting their first child. Their daughter was born on May 9, 2020. He announced in August 2022 that Ruston was expecting their second child. Their son was born on December 23, 2022.

On September 4, 2019, Hemric established the Daniel Hemric Be the Change Scholarship with Rowan–Cabarrus Community College. The annual scholarship will grant financial aid to one qualifying student in the field of motorsports, welding, or mechanical engineering.

== Motorsports career results ==
=== Racing career summary ===
Season	Series	Team	Races	Wins	Top 5	Top 10	Points	Position
2010	NASCAR Whelen Southern Modified Tour	Roger Hill	2	0	1	1	273	26th
2011	NASCAR Whelen Southern Modified Tour	Roger Hill	4	0	1	2	571	19th
2011	NASCAR Whelen Modified Tour	Roger Hill	1	0	0	0	109	48th
2012	NASCAR Whelen Southern Modified Tour	Roger Hill	3	0	1	3	117	23rd
2012	NASCAR Whelen Modified Tour	Roger Hill	2	0	0	0	57	35th
2013	NASCAR Camping World Truck Series	Sharp Gallaher Racing	2	0	0	0	43	47th
2014	NASCAR Camping World Truck Series	NTS Motorsports	1	0	0	0	32	64th
2015	CARS Super Late Model Tour	Carswell Motorsports	1	0	0	1	27	44th
2015	NASCAR K&N Pro Series East	NTS Motorsports	3	0	1	3	109	27th
2015	ARCA Racing Series	NTS Motorsports	1	0	0	0	170	103rd
2015	NASCAR Camping World Truck Series	NTS Motorsports	23	0	4	13	733	7th
2016	NASCAR Camping World Truck Series	Brad Keselowski Racing	23	0	11	17	2163	6th
2017	NASCAR Xfinity Series	Richard Childress Racing	33	0	7	16	4003	4th
2018	NASCAR Camping World Truck Series	Young's Motorsports	1	0	0	0	0	NC†
2018	NASCAR Xfinity Series	Richard Childress Racing	33	0	16	23	4033	**3rd**
2018	Monster Energy NASCAR Cup Series	Richard Childress Racing	2	0	0	0	0	NC†
2019	NASCAR K&N Pro Series West	Bill McAnally Racing	1	0	1	1	42	36th
2019	Monster Energy NASCAR Cup Series	Richard Childress Racing	36	0	1	2	505	25th
2020	NASCAR Xfinity Series	JR Motorsports	21	0	7	12	555	17th
2021	NASCAR Xfinity Series	Joe Gibbs Racing	33	1	15	21	4040	**1st**
2022	NASCAR Xfinity Series	Kaulig Racing	33	0	3	14	2220	9th
2022	NASCAR Cup Series	Kaulig Racing	8	0	0	1	0	NC†
2022	NASCAR Cup Series	23XI Racing	1	0	0	0	0	NC†
2023	NASCAR Xfinity Series	Kaulig Racing	33	0	6	18	2224	8th
2024	NASCAR Cup Series	Kaulig Racing	36	0	0	4	515	29th
2025	ARCA Menards Series West	Bill McAnally Racing	1	0	0	1	36	49th
2025	NASCAR Craftsman Truck Series	Bill McAnally Racing	25	1	10	15	2177	9th
2025	NASCAR Xfinity Series	Kaulig Racing	3	0	0	1	0	NC†
2026	CARS Pro Late Model Tour	Daniel Hemric Inc.	1	0	0	0	31	50th
2026	NASCAR Craftsman Truck Series	McAnally–Hilgemann Racing	25	0	4	12	2249	7th

^{†} As Hemric was a guest driver, he was ineligible for championship points.

=== NASCAR ===
(key) (Bold − Pole position awarded by qualifying time. Italics − Pole position earned by points standings or practice time. * – Most laps led.)

==== Cup Series ====
NASCAR Cup Series results
Year	Team	No.	Make	1	2	3	4	5	6	7	8	9	10	11	12	13	14	15	16	17	18	19	20	21	22	23	24	25	26	27	28	29	30	31	32	33	34	35	36	NCSC	Pts	Ref
2017	Richard Childress Racing	27	Chevy	DAY	ATL	LVS	PHO	CAL	MAR	TEX	BRI	RCH	TAL	KAN	CLT	DOV	POC	MCH	SON	DAY	KEN	NHA	IND	POC	GLN	MCH	BRI	DAR	RCH	CHI	NHA	DOV	CLT	TAL	KAN	MAR	TEX; QL^{†}	PHO	HOM	N/A	—	
2018	Richard Childress Racing	8	Chevy	DAY	ATL	LVS	PHO	CAL	MAR	TEX	BRI	RCH; 32	TAL	DOV	KAN	CLT	POC	MCH	SON	CHI	DAY	KEN	NHA	POC	GLN	MCH	BRI	DAR	IND	LVS	RCH	ROV; 23	DOV	TAL	KAN	MAR	TEX	PHO	HOM	61st	0^{1}	
2019	Richard Childress Racing	8	Chevy	DAY; 34	ATL; 20	LVS; 23	PHO; 18	CAL; 33	MAR; 27	TEX; 33	BRI; 30	RCH; 19	TAL; 5	DOV; 25	KAN; 18	CLT; 21	POC; 13	MCH; 12	SON; 15	CHI; 19	DAY; 18	KEN; 24	NHA; 37	POC; 7	GLN; 35	MCH; 26	BRI; 12	DAR; 37	IND; 34	LVS; 17	RCH; 25	ROV; 33	DOV; 21	TAL; 21	**KAN**; 31	MAR; 17	TEX; 16	PHO; 21	HOM; 12	25th	505	
2022	Kaulig Racing	16	Chevy	DAY; 12	CAL; 9	LVS; 22	PHO	ATL	COA	RCH	MAR	BRD	TAL; 36	DOV	DAR; 31	KAN	CLT	GTW	SON	NSH	ROA	ATL	NHA	POC	IRC	MCH	RCH	GLN	DAY; 26	DAR; 23	KAN	BRI	TEX	TAL; 34	ROV	LVS	HOM	MAR		46th	0^{1}	
2022	23XI Racing	23	Toyota																																				PHO; 17	46th	0^{1}	
2024	Kaulig Racing	31	Chevy	DAY; 16	ATL; 18	LVS; 19	PHO; 28	BRI; 28	COA; 37	RCH; 30	MAR; 28	TEX; 20	TAL; 9	DOV; 9	KAN; 30	DAR; 33	CLT; 18	GTW; 18	SON; 28	IOW; 29	NHA; 31	NSH; 9	CSC; 12	POC; 25	IND; 30	RCH; 30	MCH; 23	DAY; 9	DAR; 29	ATL; 11	GLN; 31	BRI; 19	KAN; 20	TAL; 38	ROV; 24	LVS; 19	HOM; 29	MAR; 17	PHO; 23	29th	515	
^{†} – Qualified for Paul Menard

===== Daytona 500 =====
Year	Team	Manufacturer	Start	Finish
2019	Richard Childress Racing	Chevrolet	29	34
2022	Kaulig Racing	Chevrolet	33	12
2024	Kaulig Racing	Chevrolet	37	16

==== Xfinity Series ====
NASCAR Xfinity Series results
Year	Team	No.	Make	1	2	3	4	5	6	7	8	9	10	11	12	13	14	15	16	17	18	19	20	21	22	23	24	25	26	27	28	29	30	31	32	33	NXSC	Pts	Ref
2017	Richard Childress Racing	21	Chevy	DAY; 31	ATL; 9	LVS; 13	PHO; 7	CAL; 11	TEX; 32	BRI; 5	**RCH**; 3	TAL; 38	CLT; 13	DOV; 13	POC; 9	MCH; 12	IOW; 21	DAY; 32	KEN; 9	NHA; 12	IND; 8	IOW; 7	GLN; 11	MOH; 2	BRI; 7	ROA; 15	DAR; 18	RCH; 4	CHI; 4	KEN; 7	DOV; 4	CLT; 7	KAN; 18	TEX; 14	PHO; 5	HOM; 34	4th	4003	
2018	Richard Childress Racing	21	Chevy	**DAY**; 26	ATL; 11	LVS; 6	PHO; 6	CAL; 5	TEX; 3	BRI; 3	RCH; 29	**TAL**; 23*	DOV; 3	CLT; 7	POC; 3	MCH; 2	IOW; 3	CHI; 5	DAY; 8	KEN; 2	NHA; 11	IOW; 11	GLN; 16	MOH; 3	BRI; 24	ROA; 3	DAR; 11	IND; 5	LVS; 29	RCH; 3	ROV; 10	**DOV**; 7	**KAN**; 2*	TEX; 10	PHO; 2	HOM; 5	3rd	4033	
2019	Kaulig Racing	10	Chevy	DAY	ATL	LVS	PHO	CAL	TEX	BRI	RCH	TAL	DOV	CLT; RL^{†}	POC	MCH	IOW	CHI	DAY	KEN	NHA	IOW	GLN	MOH	BRI	ROA	DAR	IND	LVS	RCH	ROV	DOV	KAN	TEX	PHO	HOM	N/A	—	
2020	JR Motorsports	8	Chevy	DAY	LVS; 35	CAL; 7	PHO; 30	DAR; 6	CLT; 2	BRI; 6	ATL; 4	HOM	HOM; 31	TAL	POC; 28	IRC	KEN	KEN; 9	TEX	KAN; 7	ROA; 35	DRC; 37	DOV	DOV; 5	DAY; 24	DAR; 37	RCH	RCH	BRI	LVS; 3	TAL; 5	ROV; 3	KAN; 2	TEX	MAR	PHO; 25	17th	555	
2021	Joe Gibbs Racing	18	Toyota	DAY; 9	DRC; 3	HOM; 3	LVS; 2*	PHO; 23	ATL; 9	MAR; 3	TAL; 12	DAR; 5	DOV; 9	COA; 29	CLT; 28*	MOH; 12	TEX; 4	NSH; 13	POC; 6	ROA; 2	ATL; 30	NHA; 3	GLN; 22	IRC; 12	MCH; 39	DAY; 5	DAR; 24	RCH; 6	BRI; 10	LVS; 5	TAL; 4	ROV; 3	TEX; 2	KAN; 15	MAR; 3	PHO; 1	1st	4040	
2022	Kaulig Racing	11	Chevy	**DAY**; 28*	CAL; 12	LVS; 3	PHO; 8	ATL; 35	COA; 25	RCH; 6	MAR; 13	TAL; 34	DOV; 11	DAR; 10	TEX; 11	CLT; 6	PIR; 6	NSH; 17	ROA; 29	ATL; 5	NHA; 35	POC; 9	IRC; 22	MCH; 8	GLN; 31	DAY; 19	DAR; 13	KAN; 15	BRI; 20	TEX; 30	TAL; 8	ROV; 17	LVS; 8	HOM; 4	MAR; 8	PHO; 8	9th	2220	
2023	Kaulig Racing	11	Chevy	DAY; 36	CAL; 12	LVS; 10	PHO; 10	ATL; 2	COA; 6	RCH; 24	MAR; 7	TAL; 21	DOV; 10	DAR; 16	CLT; 22	PIR; 33	SON; 13	NSH; 8	CSC; 7	ATL; 2	NHA; 4	POC; 5	ROA; 11	MCH; 15	IRC; 27	GLN; 23	DAY; 3	DAR; 10									8th	2224	
2023	Kaulig Racing	10	Chevy																										KAN; 34	BRI; 2	TEX; 24	ROV; 7	LVS; 9	HOM; 6	MAR; 6	PHO; 21	8th	2224	
2024	Kaulig Racing	11	Chevy	DAY	ATL	LVS	PHO	COA; QL^{‡}	RCH	MAR	TEX	TAL	DOV	DAR	CLT	PIR	SON	IOW	NHA	NSH	CSC	POC	IND	MCH	DAY	DAR	ATL	GLN	BRI	KAN	TAL	ROV	LVS	HOM	MAR	PHO	N/A	—	
2025	Kaulig Racing	11	Chevy	DAY	ATL	COA	PHO	LVS	HOM	MAR	DAR	BRI	ROC	TAL	TEX	CLT	NSH	MXC	POC	ATL	CSC	SON	DOV	IND	IOW	GLN	DAY	PIR	GTW; 7	BRI	KAN	ROV; 17	LVS; 16	TAL	MAR	PHO	86th	0^{1}	
^{†} – Relieved Austin Dillon ^{‡} – Qualified for Josh Williams

==== Truck Series ====
NASCAR Truck Series results
Year	Team	No.	Make	1	2	3	4	5	6	7	8	9	10	11	12	13	14	15	16	17	18	19	20	21	22	23	24	25	NTSC	Pts	Ref
2013	Sharp Gallaher Racing	6	Chevy	DAY	MAR	CAR	KAN	CLT	DOV	TEX	KEN	IOW	ELD	POC	MCH	BRI	MSP	IOW	CHI	LVS	TAL	MAR; 32	TEX	PHO; 13	HOM				47th	43	
2014	NTS Motorsports	20	Chevy	DAY	MAR	KAN	CLT	DOV	TEX	GTW	KEN	IOW	ELD	POC	MCH	BRI	MSP	CHI	NHA	LVS	TAL	MAR	TEX	PHO	HOM; 12				64th	32	
2015	NTS Motorsports	14	Chevy	DAY; 26	ATL; 19	MAR; 12	KAN; 10	CLT; 17	DOV; 4	TEX; 9	GTW; 9	IOW; 8	KEN; 18	ELD; 5	POC; 9	MCH; 7	BRI; 4	MSP; 4	CHI; 25	NHA; 6	LVS; 6	TAL; 28	MAR; 12	TEX; 14	PHO; 21	HOM; 8			7th	733	
2016	Brad Keselowski Racing	19	Ford	DAY; 8	ATL; 4	MAR; 22	KAN; 3	DOV; 9	CLT; 9	TEX; 10	IOW; 15	GTW; 3	KEN; 3	ELD; 8	POC; 22	BRI; 3	MCH; 3	MSP; 3	CHI; 2	NHA; 28	LVS; 2	TAL; 11	MAR; 9	TEX; 3	PHO; 13	HOM; 5			6th	2163	
2018	Young's Motorsports	20	Chevy	DAY	ATL	LVS	MAR	DOV	KAN	CLT; 21	TEX	IOW	GTW	CHI	KEN	ELD	POC	MCH	BRI	MSP	LVS	TAL	MAR	TEX	PHO	HOM			103rd	0^{1}	
2025	McAnally–Hilgemann Racing	19	Chevy	DAY; 7	ATL; 16	LVS; 13	HOM; 5	MAR; 1	BRI; 13	ROC; 3	TEX; 2	KAN; 10	NWS; 4	CLT; 8	NSH; 4	MCH; 27	POC; 5	LRP; 9	IRP; 7	GLN; 2	RCH; 33	DAR; 2	BRI; 5	NHA; 12	ROV; 11	TAL; 34	MAR; 31	PHO; 33	9th	2177	
2026	McAnally–Hilgemann Racing	19	Chevy	DAY; 26	ATL; 34	STP; 8	DAR; 9	ROC; 24	BRI; 12	TEX; 7	GLN; 4	DOV; 30	CLT; 11	NSH; 15	MCH; 13	COR; 2	LRP; 6	NWS; 20	IRP; 34	RCH; 10	NHA; 8	BRI; 12	KAN; 4	CLT; 6	PHO; 7	TAL; 35	MAR; 15	HOM; 3	7th	2249	
2027	McAnally–Hilgemann Racing	19	Chevy	DAY	ATL	STP	DAR	BRI	TEX	KAN	NWS	CLT	NSS	POC	MCH	LRP	ATL	IRP	BRI	BGS	MSP	NHA	KAN	CLT	PHO	TAL	MAR	HOM			

^{*} Season still in progress
^{1} Ineligible for series points

=== ARCA Racing Series ===
(key) (Bold – Pole position awarded by qualifying time. Italics – Pole position earned by points standings or practice time. * – Most laps led.)

ARCA Racing Series results
Year	Team	No.	Make	1	2	3	4	5	6	7	8	9	10	11	12	13	14	15	16	17	18	19	20	ARSC	Pts	Ref
2015	NTS Motorsports	92	Chevy	DAY; 12	MOB	NSH	SLM	TAL	TOL	NJE	POC	MCH	CHI	WIN	IOW	IRP	POC	BLN	ISF	DSF	SLM	KEN	KAN	103rd	170	

==== K&N Pro Series East ====
NASCAR K&N Pro Series East results
Year	Team	No.	Make	1	2	3	4	5	6	7	8	9	10	11	12	13	14	NKNPSEC	Pts	Ref
2015	NTS Motorsports	20	Chevy	NSM	**GRE**; 5	BRI; 8	IOW	BGS	LGY	COL	NHA	IOW	GLN; 10	MOT	VIR	RCH	DOV	27th	109	

==== ARCA Menards Series West ====
ARCA Menards Series West results
Year	Team	No.	Make	1	2	3	4	5	6	7	8	9	10	11	12	13	14	AMSWC	Pts	Ref
2019	Bill McAnally Racing	50	Chevy	LVS	IRW	TUS	TUS	CNS	SON; 2	DCS	IOW	EVG	GTW	MER	AAS	KCR	PHO	36th	42	
2025	Bill McAnally Racing	19	Chevy	**KER**; 9	PHO	TUC	CNS	KER	SON	TRI	PIR	AAS	MAD	LVS	PHO			49th	36	

==== Whelen Modified Tour ====
NASCAR Whelen Modified Tour results
Year	Car owner	No.	Make	1	2	3	4	5	6	7	8	9	10	11	12	13	14	15	16	NWMTC	Pts	Ref
2011	Roger Hill	79	Pontiac	THO	STA	STA	MON	THO	NHA	RIV	STA	NHA	BRI	DEL	THO	LIM	NHA	STA	THO; 18	48th	109	
2012	Roger Hill	79	Pontiac	THO; 20	STA; 11	MON	STA	WAT	NHA	STA	THO	BRI	THO	RIV	NHA	STA	THO			35th	57	

==== Whelen Southern Modified Tour ====
NASCAR Whelen Southern Modified Tour results
Year	Car owner	No.	Make	1	2	3	4	5	6	7	8	9	10	11	12	13	14	NSWMTC	Pts	Ref
2010	Roger Hill	19	Pontiac	ATL	CRW	SBO	CRW	BGS	BRI	CRW; 15	LGY	TRI	CLT; 5					26th	273	
2011	Roger Hill	19	Pontiac	CRW	HCY	SBO	CRW	CRW	BGS	BRI; 11								19th	571	
2011	Roger Hill	79	Pontiac								CRW; 7	LGY	THO	TRI	CRW	CLT; 11	CRW; 3	19th	571	
2012	Roger Hill	79	Pontiac	CRW; 6	CRW; 3	SBO	CRW; 6	CRW	BGS	BRI	LGY	THO	CRW	CLT				23rd	117	

=== CARS Super Late Model Tour ===
(key) (Bold – Pole position awarded by qualifying time. Italics – Pole position earned by points standings or practice time. * – Most laps led. ** – All laps led.)

CARS Super Late Model Tour results
Year	Team	No.	Make	1	2	3	4	5	6	7	8	9	10	CSLMTC	Pts	Ref
2015	Carswell Motorsports	98	Chevy	SNM	ROU	HCY; 6	SNM	TCM	MMS	ROU	CNS	MYB	HCY	44th	27	

=== CARS Pro Late Model Tour ===
(key)

CARS Pro Late Model Tour results
Year	Team	No.	Make	1	2	3	4	5	6	7	8	9	10	11	CPLMTC	Pts	Ref
2026	Daniel Hemric Inc.	54H	Chevy	SNM	NSV	CRW; 11	ACE	NWS	HCY	AND	FLC	TCM	NPS	SBO	50th	31	

Achievements
Preceded by Inaugural	Southern Super Series Champion; 2013	Succeeded by Bubba Pollard
Preceded by William Byron	NASCAR Cup Series Rookie of the Year; 2019	Succeeded by Cole Custer
Preceded by Austin Cindric	NASCAR Xfinity Series Champion; 2021	Succeeded by Ty Gibbs
