= Legends Big Money 100 =

Legends All-Star
- Venue: Charlotte Motor Speedway
- First race: 2010
- Distance: 25 miles (40.2 km)
- Laps: 50
- Previous names: WhereRacingLives.com Legends Million presented by zMax (2010), Legends Big Money 100 (2011 & 2012)

The Legends All Star is a Legends car race at Charlotte Motor Speedway. In the first year of the Legends All Star (then known as the Legends Million), 300+ Legends cars and 50 Bandoleros showed up. The 2nd annual Legends Million was announced on June 14, 2011 during the 2nd round of the track's Summer Shootout Series in the drivers meeting that the race will come back and will be on August 1 and 2. The first Legends Million had a million dollar purse with $250,000 to the winner of the main feature. The 2011 edition of the Big Money 100 will have a $100,000 purse with $25,000 to the winner of the main feature, $5,000 to the Master's feature winner and $4,000 to the winner of the Semi-Pro/Young Lions feature. The Legends All Star replaced the Legends Big Money 100 event in 2013 and ran on the same night as Liftmaster Pole Night for the NASCAR Sprint Cup Series on the May race weekend. Tyler Green won the rain-shorten event. 46 cars between 4 divisions (Pro, Semi-Pro, Masters & Young Lions) entered the event. Charlotte Motor Speedway did not continue the event in 2014.

== Race Winners ==
Year	Date	Legends All Star Race Winner	Masters Race Winner	Semi-Pro/Young Lions Race Winner	Bandolero Duel Champions
Legends Million
2010	July 15–17	Daniel Hemric	Brian Sockwell	Sean Rayhall	Reed Hatchet, Clayton Weatherman, and John Holleman IV
Legends Big Money 100
2011	August 1–2	Kyle Plott		Josh Morris	Trent Barnes, Carson Ferguson, and Tyler Lester
2012	July 2–3	Tyler Green	Tom Pistone	Trey Jarrell	Austin Green and Seth Werner
Legends All-Star
2013	May 23	Tyler Green			
2015	May 21	Carson Ferguson			
