= 2019 Daytona 500 =

61st running of NASCAR's premier event, held at Daytona International Speedway in 2019

Race details
- Race 1 of 36 in the 2019 Monster Energy NASCAR Cup Series
- Date: February 17, 2019
- Location: Daytona International Speedway in Daytona Beach, Florida
- Course: Permanent racing facility 2.5 mi (4 km)
- Distance: 207 laps, 517.5 mi (828 km)
- Scheduled distance: 200 laps, 500 mi (800 km)
- Average speed: 137.440 miles per hour (221.188 km/h)

Pole position
Driver	William Byron	Hendrick Motorsports
- Time: 46.319

Qualifying race winners
Duel 1 Winner	Kevin Harvick	Stewart–Haas Racing
Duel 2 Winner	Joey Logano	Team Penske

Most laps led
Driver	Matt DiBenedetto	Leavine Family Racing
- Laps: 49

Winner
No. 11	Denny Hamlin	Joe Gibbs Racing

Television in the United States
- Network: Fox
- Announcers: Mike Joy, Jeff Gordon and Darrell Waltrip
- Nielsen ratings: 9.170 million

Radio in the United States
- Radio: MRN
- Booth announcers: Alex Hayden, Jeff Striegle and Rusty Wallace
- Turn announcers: Dave Moody (1 & 2), Mike Bagley (Backstretch) and Kyle Rickey (3 & 4)

The 2019 Daytona 500, the 61st running of the event, was a Monster Energy NASCAR Cup Series race held on February 17, 2019, Contested over 207 laps—extended from 200 laps due to an overtime finish, on the 2.5-mile (4.0 km) asphalt superspeedway. After three multiple cars crash in the last 20 laps (including the Big One on lap 191 which involved 21 cars), only 19 of the 40 cars were running at the end of the race and only 14 completed every lap. It was the first race of the 2019 Monster Energy NASCAR Cup Series season, and also marked the debut of the Ford Mustang, which Ford brought in as a replacement for the Fusion. 2016 winner Denny Hamlin held off teammate Kyle Busch over the final laps to win his second Daytona 500 in four years.

This Daytona 500 was the first not to feature the Earnhardt name in the starting lineup since 1978.

== Report ==
=== Background ===
Daytona International Speedway, the track where the race was held

Daytona International Speedway is one of two superspeedways to hold NASCAR races, the other being Talladega Superspeedway. The standard track at Daytona International Speedway is a four-turn superspeedway that is 2.5 miles (4.0 km) long. The track's turns are banked at 31 degrees, while the front stretch, the location of the finish line, is banked at 18 degrees.

=== Entry list ===
No.	Driver	Team	Manufacturer
00	Landon Cassill	StarCom Racing	Chevrolet
1	Kurt Busch (W)	Chip Ganassi Racing	Chevrolet
2	Brad Keselowski	Team Penske	Ford
3	Austin Dillon (W)	Richard Childress Racing	Chevrolet
4	Kevin Harvick (W)	Stewart–Haas Racing	Ford
6	Ryan Newman (W)	Roush Fenway Racing	Ford
8	Daniel Hemric (R)	Richard Childress Racing	Chevrolet
9	Chase Elliott	Hendrick Motorsports	Chevrolet
10	Aric Almirola	Stewart–Haas Racing	Ford
11	Denny Hamlin (W)	Joe Gibbs Racing	Toyota
12	Ryan Blaney	Team Penske	Ford
13	Ty Dillon	Germain Racing	Chevrolet
14	Clint Bowyer	Stewart–Haas Racing	Ford
15	Ross Chastain (i)	Premium Motorsports	Chevrolet
17	Ricky Stenhouse Jr.	Roush Fenway Racing	Ford
18	Kyle Busch	Joe Gibbs Racing	Toyota
19	Martin Truex Jr.	Joe Gibbs Racing	Toyota
20	Erik Jones	Joe Gibbs Racing	Toyota
21	Paul Menard	Wood Brothers Racing	Ford
22	Joey Logano (W)	Team Penske	Ford
24	William Byron	Hendrick Motorsports	Chevrolet
27	Casey Mears	Germain Racing	Chevrolet
31	Tyler Reddick (i)	Richard Childress Racing	Chevrolet
32	Corey LaJoie	Go Fas Racing	Ford
34	Michael McDowell	Front Row Motorsports	Ford
36	Matt Tifft (R)	Front Row Motorsports	Ford
37	Chris Buescher	JTG Daugherty Racing	Chevrolet
38	David Ragan	Front Row Motorsports	Ford
40	Jamie McMurray (W)	Spire Motorsports	Chevrolet
41	Daniel Suárez	Stewart–Haas Racing	Ford
42	Kyle Larson	Chip Ganassi Racing	Chevrolet
43	Bubba Wallace	Richard Petty Motorsports	Chevrolet
47	Ryan Preece (R)	JTG Daugherty Racing	Chevrolet
48	Jimmie Johnson (W)	Hendrick Motorsports	Chevrolet
51	B. J. McLeod (i)	Petty Ware Racing	Chevrolet
52	Cody Ware (R)	Rick Ware Racing	Chevrolet
62	Brendan Gaughan (i)	Beard Motorsports	Chevrolet
66	Joey Gase (i)	MBM Motorsports	Toyota
71	Ryan Truex (i)	Tommy Baldwin Racing	Chevrolet
88	Alex Bowman	Hendrick Motorsports	Chevrolet
95	Matt DiBenedetto	Leavine Family Racing	Toyota
96	Parker Kligerman (i)	Gaunt Brothers Racing	Toyota
Official entry list

== Practice ==
=== First practice (February 9) ===
Martin Truex Jr. was the fastest in the first practice session with a time of 45.937 seconds and a speed of 195.920 mph (315.303 km/h).

Pos	No.	Driver	Team	Manufacturer	Time	Speed
1	19	Martin Truex Jr.	Joe Gibbs Racing	Toyota	45.937	195.920
2	18	Kyle Busch	Joe Gibbs Racing	Toyota	45.953	195.852
3	20	Erik Jones	Joe Gibbs Racing	Toyota	45.967	195.793
Official first practice results

=== Second practice (February 9) ===
Bubba Wallace was the fastest in the second practice session with a time of 46.149 seconds and a speed of 195.020 mph (313.854 km/h).

Pos	No.	Driver	Team	Manufacturer	Time	Speed
1	43	Bubba Wallace	Richard Petty Motorsports	Chevrolet	46.149	195.020
2	13	Ty Dillon	Germain Racing	Chevrolet	46.152	195.008
3	38	David Ragan	Front Row Motorsports	Ford	46.168	194.940
Official second practice results

== Qualifying ==
William Byron scored the pole for the race with a time of 46.319 and a speed of 194.305 mph (312.704 km/h).

=== Qualifying results ===
Pos	No	Driver	Team	Manufacturer	R1	R2
1	24	William Byron	Hendrick Motorsports	Chevrolet	46.432	46.319
2	88	Alex Bowman	Hendrick Motorsports	Chevrolet	46.408	46.355
3	48	Jimmie Johnson	Hendrick Motorsports	Chevrolet	46.649	46.438
4	9	Chase Elliott	Hendrick Motorsports	Chevrolet	46.469	46.444
5	8	Daniel Hemric (R)	Richard Childress Racing	Chevrolet	46.861	46.763
6	22	Joey Logano	Team Penske	Ford	46.782	46.766
7	19	Martin Truex Jr.	Joe Gibbs Racing	Toyota	46.803	46.789
8	14	Clint Bowyer	Stewart–Haas Racing	Ford	46.857	46.804
9	2	Brad Keselowski	Team Penske	Ford	46.797	46.811
10	3	Austin Dillon	Richard Childress Racing	Chevrolet	46.938	47.018
11	21	Paul Menard	Wood Brothers Racing	Ford	47.072	47.094
12	11	Denny Hamlin	Joe Gibbs Racing	Toyota	47.009	47.246
13	18	Kyle Busch	Joe Gibbs Racing	Toyota	47.080	—
14	20	Erik Jones	Joe Gibbs Racing	Toyota	47.089	—
15	4	Kevin Harvick	Stewart–Haas Racing	Ford	47.131	—
16	31	Tyler Reddick (i)	Richard Childress Racing	Chevrolet	47.161	—
17	12	Ryan Blaney	Team Penske	Ford	47.170	—
18	17	Ricky Stenhouse Jr.	Roush Fenway Racing	Ford	47.177	—
19	10	Aric Almirola	Stewart–Haas Racing	Ford	47.185	—
20	41	Daniel Suárez	Stewart–Haas Racing	Ford	47.195	—
21	1	Kurt Busch	Chip Ganassi Racing	Chevrolet	47.222	—
22	37	Chris Buescher	JTG Daugherty Racing	Chevrolet	47.261	—
23	38	David Ragan	Front Row Motorsports	Ford	47.264	—
24	6	Ryan Newman	Roush Fenway Racing	Ford	47.364	—
25	34	Michael McDowell	Front Row Motorsports	Ford	47.374	—
26	27	Casey Mears	Germain Racing	Chevrolet	47.406	—
27	71	Ryan Truex (i)	Tommy Baldwin Racing	Chevrolet	47.434	—
28	47	Ryan Preece (R)	JTG Daugherty Racing	Chevrolet	47.441	—
29	40	Jamie McMurray	Spire Motorsports	Chevrolet	47.498	—
30	95	Matt DiBenedetto	Leavine Family Racing	Toyota	47.515	—
31	62	Brendan Gaughan (i)	Beard Motorsports	Chevrolet	47.520	—
32	42	Kyle Larson	Chip Ganassi Racing	Chevrolet	47.565	—
33	43	Bubba Wallace	Richard Petty Motorsports	Chevrolet	47.571	—
34	13	Ty Dillon	Germain Racing	Chevrolet	47.691	—
35	36	Matt Tifft (R)	Front Row Motorsports	Ford	47.703	—
36	96	Parker Kligerman (i)	Gaunt Brothers Racing	Toyota	47.820	—
37	15	Ross Chastain (i)	Premium Motorsports	Chevrolet	47.898	—
38	00	Landon Cassill	StarCom Racing	Chevrolet	48.025	—
39	32	Corey LaJoie	Go Fas Racing	Ford	48.427	—
40	52	Cody Ware (R)	Rick Ware Racing	Chevrolet	48.983	—
41	51	B. J. McLeod (i)	Petty Ware Racing	Chevrolet	49.266	—
42	66	Joey Gase (i)	MBM Motorsports	Toyota	49.743	—
Official qualifying results

== Gander RV Duel ==
The Gander RV Duels are a pair of NASCAR Monster Energy Cup Series races held in conjunction with the Daytona 500 annually in February at Daytona International Speedway. They consist of two races 60 laps and 150 miles (240 km) in length, which serve as heat races that set the lineup for the Daytona 500. The first race sets the lineup for cars that qualified in odd-numbered positions on pole qualifying day, while the second race sets the lineup for cars that qualified in even-numbered positions. The Duels set the lineup for positions 3–38, while positions 39 and 40 are filled by the two "Open" (teams without a charter) cars that set the fastest times in qualifying, but did not lock in a spot in the Duels.

For championship purposes, each Duel is a full Championship Stage, except there is no playoff point awarded. The top ten drivers receive championship points.

=== Duel 1 ===
==== Duel 1 results ====
Pos	Grid	No	Driver	Team	Manufacturer	Laps	Points
1	8	4	Kevin Harvick	Stewart–Haas Racing	Ford	60	10
2	10	17	Ricky Stenhouse Jr.	Roush Fenway Racing	Ford	60	9
3	6	21	Paul Menard	Wood Brothers Racing	Ford	60	8
4	16	95	Matt DiBenedetto	Leavine Family Racing	Toyota	60	7
5	4	19	Martin Truex Jr.	Joe Gibbs Racing	Toyota	60	6
6	17	43	Bubba Wallace	Richard Petty Motorsports	Chevrolet	60	5
7	12	37	Chris Buescher	JTG Daugherty Racing	Chevrolet	60	4
8	2	48	Jimmie Johnson	Hendrick Motorsports	Chevrolet	60	3
9	13	6	Ryan Newman	Roush Fenway Racing	Ford	60	2
10	15	47	Ryan Preece (R)	JTG Daugherty Racing	Chevrolet	60	1
11	11	41	Daniel Suárez	Stewart–Haas Racing	Ford	60	0
12	19	96	Parker Kligerman (i)	Gaunt Brothers Racing	Toyota	60	0
13	9	31	Tyler Reddick (i)	Richard Childress Racing	Chevrolet	60	0
14	14	71	Ryan Truex (i)	Tommy Baldwin Racing	Chevrolet	60	0
15	20	00	Landon Cassill	StarCom Racing	Chevrolet	60	0
16	1	24	William Byron	Hendrick Motorsports	Chevrolet	60	0
17	3	8	Daniel Hemric (R)	Richard Childress Racing	Chevrolet	59	0
18	7	18	Kyle Busch	Joe Gibbs Racing	Toyota	59	0
19	18	36	Matt Tifft (R)	Front Row Motorsports	Ford	59	0
20	5	2	Brad Keselowski	Team Penske	Ford	58	0
21	21	52	Cody Ware (R)	Rick Ware Racing	Chevrolet	58	0
Official race results

=== Duel 2 ===
==== Duel 2 results ====
Pos	Grid	No	Driver	Team	Manufacturer	Laps	Points
1	3	22	Joey Logano	Team Penske	Ford	60	10
2	4	14	Clint Bowyer	Stewart–Haas Racing	Ford	60	9
3	9	10	Aric Almirola	Stewart–Haas Racing	Ford	60	8
4	6	11	Denny Hamlin	Joe Gibbs Racing	Toyota	60	7
5	10	1	Kurt Busch	Chip Ganassi Racing	Chevrolet	60	6
6	8	12	Ryan Blaney	Team Penske	Ford	60	5
7	14	40	Jamie McMurray	Spire Motorsports	Chevrolet	60	4
8	2	9	Chase Elliott	Hendrick Motorsports	Chevrolet	60	3
9	5	3	Austin Dillon	Richard Childress Racing	Chevrolet	60	2
10	17	13	Ty Dillon	Germain Racing	Chevrolet	60	1
11	11	38	David Ragan	Front Row Motorsports	Ford	60	0
12	16	42	Kyle Larson	Chip Ganassi Racing	Chevrolet	60	0
13	1	88	Alex Bowman	Hendrick Motorsports	Chevrolet	59	0
14	7	20	Erik Jones	Joe Gibbs Racing	Toyota	59	0
15	15	62	Brendan Gaughan (i)	Beard Motorsports	Chevrolet	59	0
16	19	32	Corey LaJoie	Go Fas Racing	Ford	59	0
17	13	27	Casey Mears	Germain Racing	Chevrolet	59	0
18	12	34	Michael McDowell	Front Row Motorsports	Ford	58	0
19	18	15	Ross Chastain (i)	Premium Motorsports	Chevrolet	57	0
20	21	66	Joey Gase (i)	MBM Motorsports	Toyota	57	0
21	20	51	B. J. McLeod (i)	Petty Ware Racing	Chevrolet	57	0
Official race results

=== Starting lineup ===
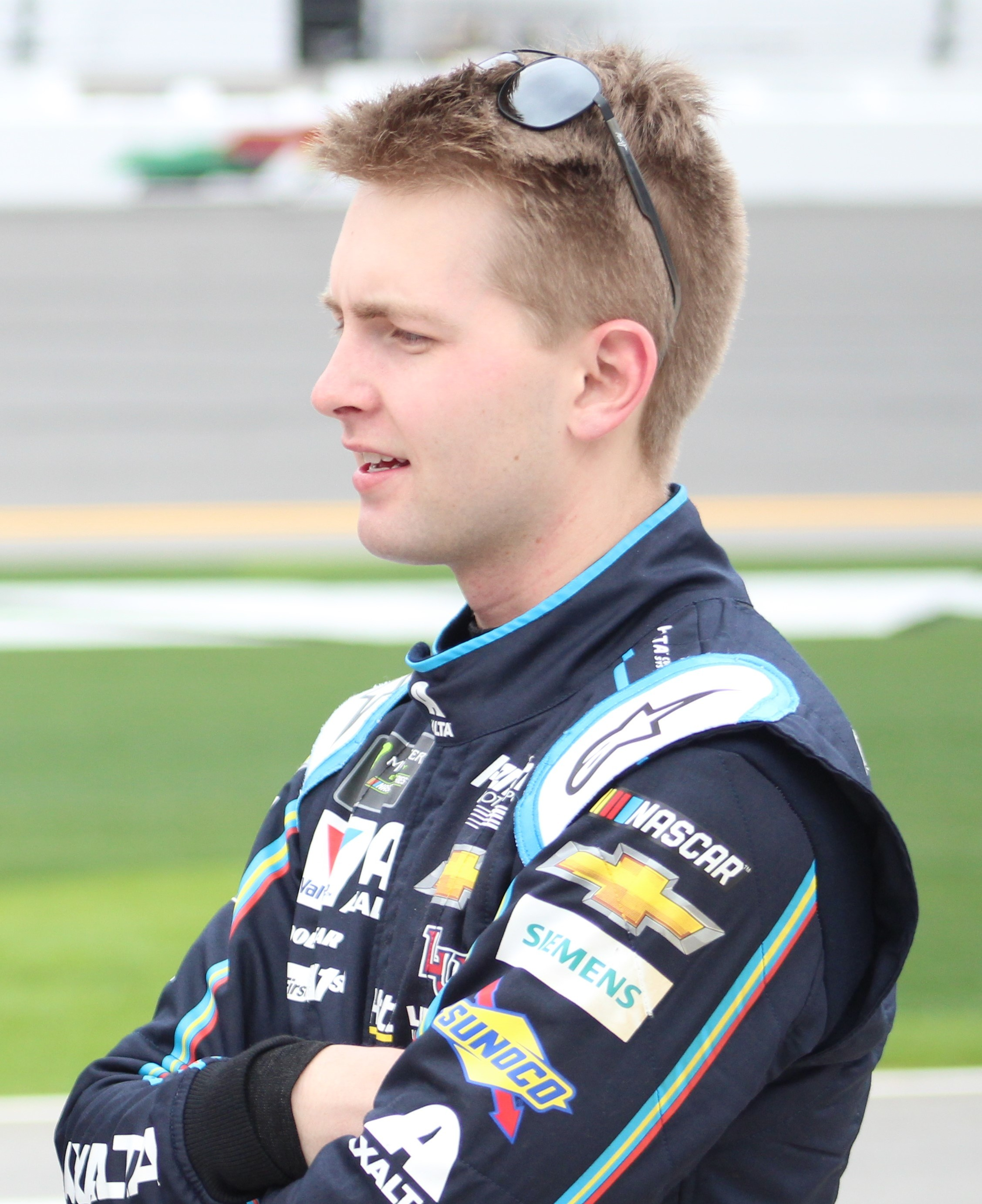
William Byron started from pole position.

Pos	No.	Driver	Team	Manufacturer	Notes
1	24	William Byron	Hendrick Motorsports	Chevrolet	Fastest in pole qualifying
2	88	Alex Bowman	Hendrick Motorsports	Chevrolet	Second in pole qualifying
3	4	Kevin Harvick	Stewart Haas Racing	Ford	Duel 1 Winner
4	22	Joey Logano	Team Penske	Ford	Duel 2 Winner
5	17	Ricky Stenhouse Jr.	Roush Fenway Racing	Ford	Second in Duel 1
6	14	Clint Bowyer	Stewart–Haas Racing	Ford	Second in Duel 2
7	21	Paul Menard	Wood Brothers Racing	Ford	Third in Duel 1
8	10	Aric Almirola	Stewart–Haas Racing	Ford	Third in Duel 2
9	95	Matt DiBenedetto	Leavine Family Racing	Toyota	Fourth in Duel 1
10	11	Denny Hamlin	Joe Gibbs Racing	Toyota	Fourth in Duel 2
11	19	Martin Truex Jr.	Joe Gibbs Racing	Toyota	Fifth in Duel 1
12	1	Kurt Busch	Chip Ganassi Racing	Chevrolet	Fifth in Duel 2
13	43	Bubba Wallace	Richard Petty Motorsports	Chevrolet	Sixth in Duel 1
14	12	Ryan Blaney	Team Penske	Ford	Sixth in Duel 2
15	37	Chris Buescher	JTG Daugherty Racing	Chevrolet	Seventh in Duel 1
16	40	Jamie McMurray	Spire Motorsports	Chevrolet	Seventh in Duel 2
17	48	Jimmie Johnson	Hendrick Motorsports	Chevrolet	Eighth in Duel 1
18	9	Chase Elliott	Hendrick Motorsports	Chevrolet	Eighth in Duel 2
19	6	Ryan Newman	Roush Fenway Racing	Ford	Ninth in Duel 1
20	3	Austin Dillon	Richard Childress Racing	Chevrolet	Ninth in Duel 2
21	47	Ryan Preece (R)	JTG Daugherty Racing	Chevrolet	10th in Duel 1
22	13	Ty Dillon	Germain Racing	Chevrolet	10th in Duel 2
23	41	Daniel Suárez	Stewart–Haas Racing	Ford	11th in Duel 1
24	38	David Ragan	Front Row Motorsports	Ford	11th in Duel 2
25	96	Parker Kligerman (i)	Gaunt Brothers Racing	Toyota	12th in Duel 1
26	42	Kyle Larson	Chip Ganassi Racing	Chevrolet	12th in Duel 2
27	00	Landon Cassill	StarCom Racing	Chevrolet	15th in Duel 1
28	20	Erik Jones	Joe Gibbs Racing	Toyota	14th in Duel 2
29	8	Daniel Hemric (R)	Richard Childress Racing	Chevrolet	17th in Duel 1
30	62	Brendan Gaughan (i)	Beard Motorsports	Chevrolet	15th in Duel 2
31	18	Kyle Busch	Joe Gibbs Racing	Toyota	18th in Duel 1
32	32	Corey LaJoie	Go Fas Racing	Ford	16th in Duel 2
33	36	Matt Tifft (R)	Front Row Motorsports	Ford	19th in Duel 1
34	34	Michael McDowell	Front Row Motorsports	Ford	18th in Duel 2
35	2	Brad Keselowski	Team Penske	Ford	20th in Duel 1
36	15	Ross Chastain (i)	Premium Motorsports	Chevrolet	19th in Duel 2
37	52	Cody Ware (R)	Rick Ware Racing	Chevrolet	21st in Duel 1
38	51	B. J. McLeod (i)	Petty Ware Racing	Chevrolet	21st in Duel 2
39	31	Tyler Reddick (i)	Richard Childress Racing	Chevrolet	Qualifying speed
40	27	Casey Mears	Germain Racing	Chevrolet	Qualifying speed
Did not qualify
41	66	Joey Gase (i)	MBM Motorsports	Toyota	
42	71	Ryan Truex (i)	Tommy Baldwin Racing	Chevrolet	
Official starting lineup

== Practice (post–Duels) ==
=== Third practice (February 15) ===
Kyle Busch was the fastest in the third practice session with a time of 44.936 seconds and a speed of 200.285 mph (322.327 km/h).

Pos	No.	Driver	Team	Manufacturer	Time	Speed
1	18	Kyle Busch	Joe Gibbs Racing	Toyota	44.936	200.285
2	19	Martin Truex Jr.	Joe Gibbs Racing	Toyota	44.955	200.200
3	47	Ryan Preece (R)	JTG Daugherty Racing	Chevrolet	44.962	200.169
Official third practice results

=== Fourth practice (February 15) ===
Paul Menard was the fastest in the fourth practice session with a time of 44.830 seconds and a speed of 200.758 mph (323.089 km/h).

Pos	No.	Driver	Team	Manufacturer	Time	Speed
1	21	Paul Menard	Wood Brothers Racing	Ford	44.830	200.758
2	40	Jamie McMurray	Spire Motorsports	Chevrolet	44.844	200.696
3	17	Ricky Stenhouse Jr.	Roush Fenway Racing	Ford	44.851	200.664
Official fourth practice results

=== Final practice (February 16) ===
Michael McDowell was the fastest in the final practice session with a time of 47.012 seconds and a speed of 191.440 mph (308.093 km/h).

Pos	No.	Driver	Team	Manufacturer	Time	Speed
1	34	Michael McDowell	Front Row Motorsports	Ford	47.012	191.440
2	13	Ty Dillon	Germain Racing	Chevrolet	47.014	191.432
3	24	William Byron	Hendrick Motorsports	Chevrolet	47.037	191.339
Official final practice results

== Race ==
New England Patriots wide receiver Julian Edelman and Houston Texans linebacker J. J. Watt each had duties before the race. Watt, the race's grand marshal, became the first NFL player to give "drivers, start your engines" in race history. Edelman was the race's honorary starter – something several current and former NFL players have done in year's past – as Edelman waved the green flag to signal the start of the 500. "I think these guys are absolutely insane," Edelman, the MVP at Super Bowl LIII earlier that month, said before the race. "First and foremost, they’re going 200 miles an hour around for three hours straight and (are) able to focus in extreme conditions."

=== Stage 1 ===
Pole sitter William Byron led the first lap of the race. On lap 3, Ricky Stenhouse Jr. battled Byron for the lead and was able to get in front of him by lap 5. On lap 7, Matt DiBenedetto battled Stenhouse for the lead and was able to get in front of him on lap 11. On lap 21, the first caution flew when Corey LaJoie's right front tire blew and had laid debris on the racetrack. Some drivers pitted during the green flag run including Ricky Stenhouse Jr. and Stenhouse led the field to the restart on lap 25. On lap 35, Kyle Busch took the lead. On lap 50, the second caution flew for it being the first multi car wreck of the race in turn 2. It started when Kurt Busch cut across the nose of Ricky Stenhouse Jr. and Busch spun. Drivers started to check up but Bubba Wallace spun after getting bumped from behind by Tyler Reddick and it sent Wallace into Kurt Busch and the two spun. The wreck also collected Austin Dillon and Jamie McMurray. The race would restart on lap 54. Kyle Busch held onto the lead and Busch won stage 1 earning himself 10 playoff points.

=== Stage 2 ===
Some drivers pitted while others stayed out including Joey Logano and Logano led the field to the restart on lap 66. On the restart, Daniel Suárez took the lead but was immeadietly passed by Logano. On lap 73, Logano pitted which gave the lead to Daniel Hemric. On lap 74, Matt DiBenedetto took the lead from Hemric. DiBenedetto had recently joined Leavine Family Racing whom had formed a technical alliance with Joe Gibbs Racing and it began to show as DiBenedetto held onto the lead until the next caution. On lap 107, the fourth caution would fly when Casey Mears and Parker Kligerman crashed in turn 1. Ryan Blaney was the new leader and Blaney led the field to the restart on lap 112. Blaney would hold off the pack and Blaney would win stage 2 giving himself 10 playoff points.

=== Final stage ===
William Byron was the new leader and Byron led the field to the restart on lap 126. On the restart, Aric Almirola took the lead but was immeadietly passed by Byron. Almirola attempted to take the lead on lap 127 but failed to get in front of Byron. With 44 laps to go, green flag pitstops began. With 42 to go, the 6th caution would fly for the second multi car crash of the race that occurred on pit road. Drivers began to slow down to make their way down to pit road which caused some cars to check up. B. J. McLeod went to go to pit road but got hooked in the right rear by his teammate at Rick Ware racing in Cody Ware and both McLeod and Ware went spinning towards the entrance of pit road. Ware spun into Tyler Reddick which caused Reddick to spin and ramp over the left rear of Jimmie Johnson's car giving both of them damage before Ware spun into Ricky Stenhouse Jr. which caused Stenhouse to turn left into Reddick and sent Stenhouse spinning. Kyle Busch won the race off of pit road but Jamie McMurray did not pit and McMurray led the field to the restart with 33 laps to go. On the restart, Denny Hamlin attempted to take the lead from McMurray but could not get in front of him. With 31 to go, Hamlin was able to take the lead from McMurray. With 27 laps to go, the 7th caution would fly for debris. The race would restart with 23 laps to go. With 20 to go, the 8th caution would fly when Kyle Larson crashed in turn 3 after he blew a left rear tire. The race would restart with 16 laps to go. With 14 laps to go, the 9th caution would fly when Brad Keselowski blew a left rear tire and spun off of turn 4. The race would restart with 10 laps to go. On the restart, Kyle Busch took the lead from Hamlin. At the same time, the 10th caution flew for the first of three big wrecks that would occur in the final 10 laps of the race. It started in turn 3 when Paul Menard was pushing Matt DiBenedetto but Menard bumped DiBenedetto at the wrong angle and turned DiBenedetto around right in front of the pack and collected a lot of more cars with them. During the wreck, David Ragan ended up lifting the rear of Aric Almirola's car and Ragan was underneath Almirola. DiBenedetto's race had unfortunately come to an end. DiBenedetto led a race high 49 laps and was in the midst of pulling off perhaps one of the greatest upsets in NASCAR history before he got collected. The wreck collected a total of 22 cars. The cars involved were Matt DiBenedetto, Paul Menard, Erik Jones, Ryan Blaney, Matt Tifft, Tyler Reddick, Daniel Suárez, Austin Dillon, Ryan Newman, Aric Almirola, David Ragan, Ricky Stenhouse Jr., Ryan Preece, Chris Buescher, Daniel Hemric, Martin Truex Jr., Chase Elliott, Jimmie Johnson, William Byron, Ty Dillon, Joey Logano, and Kyle Larson. The race was red flagged for about 20 minutes to clean up the wreck before the race restarted with 6 laps to go. Kyle Busch took the lead on the restart as he was looking for his first ever Daytona 500 win in his 15th try. But going into turn 3, the 11th caution would fly for the second big one of the race that collected 7 cars. It started when Ricky Stenhouse Jr. went to the inside of Kyle Larson to make it three wide but ended up making contact with Larson and sent Stenhouse into Kevin Harvick and it sent the three cars spinning into turn 3 and also collected Chase Elliott, Alex Bowman, Ty Dillon, and Brad Keselowski. During the wreck, Ryan Preece attempted to shoot through the gap of the spinning Elliott and Stenhouse and Preece was able to do so on the apron of the track unscathed. This put Preece in the 7th spot and in contention for the win. The race would restart with 2 laps to go. On the restart, Denny Hamlin took the lead. Going down the backstretch, Clint Bowyer went to make it three wide underneath Michael McDowell and William Byron but Bowyer ended up cutting across the nose of McDowell and turned up into Byron and Chase Elliott and triggered the third big one and the 12th and final caution of the race collecting 8 cars including Landon Cassill, Jamie McMurray, Brad Keselowski, and Brendan Gaughan. The wreck would cause another red flag and would set up overtime. On the restart, Hamlin would jump in front for the lead and Hamlin would be able to hold off the pack and win his second career Daytona 500 victory. The win was a special one for Hamlin and Joe Gibbs Racing after former college football player and NASCAR driver J. D. Gibbs, the son of Joe Gibbs, passed away over a month ago on January 11 at the age of 49. The win occurred seven days before Gibbs would've turned 50. Kyle Busch, Erik Jones, Joey Logano, and Michael McDowell rounded out the top 5 while Ty Dillon, Kyle Larson, Ryan Preece, Jimmie Johnson, and Ross Chastain rounded out the top 10. This would be Ross Chastain's first career Cup Series top 10.

== Race results ==
=== Stage Results ===
Stage One Laps: 60

Pos	No	Driver	Team	Manufacturer	Points
1	18	Kyle Busch	Joe Gibbs Racing	Toyota	10
2	88	Alex Bowman	Hendrick Motorsports	Chevrolet	9
3	22	Joey Logano	Team Penske	Ford	8
4	41	Daniel Suárez	Stewart–Haas Racing	Ford	7
5	12	Ryan Blaney	Team Penske	Ford	6
6	11	Denny Hamlin	Joe Gibbs Racing	Toyota	5
7	9	Chase Elliott	Hendrick Motorsports	Chevrolet	4
8	42	Kyle Larson	Chip Ganassi Racing	Chevrolet	3
9	4	Kevin Harvick	Stewart–Haas Racing	Ford	2
10	20	Erik Jones	Joe Gibbs Racing	Toyota	1
Official stage one results

Stage Two

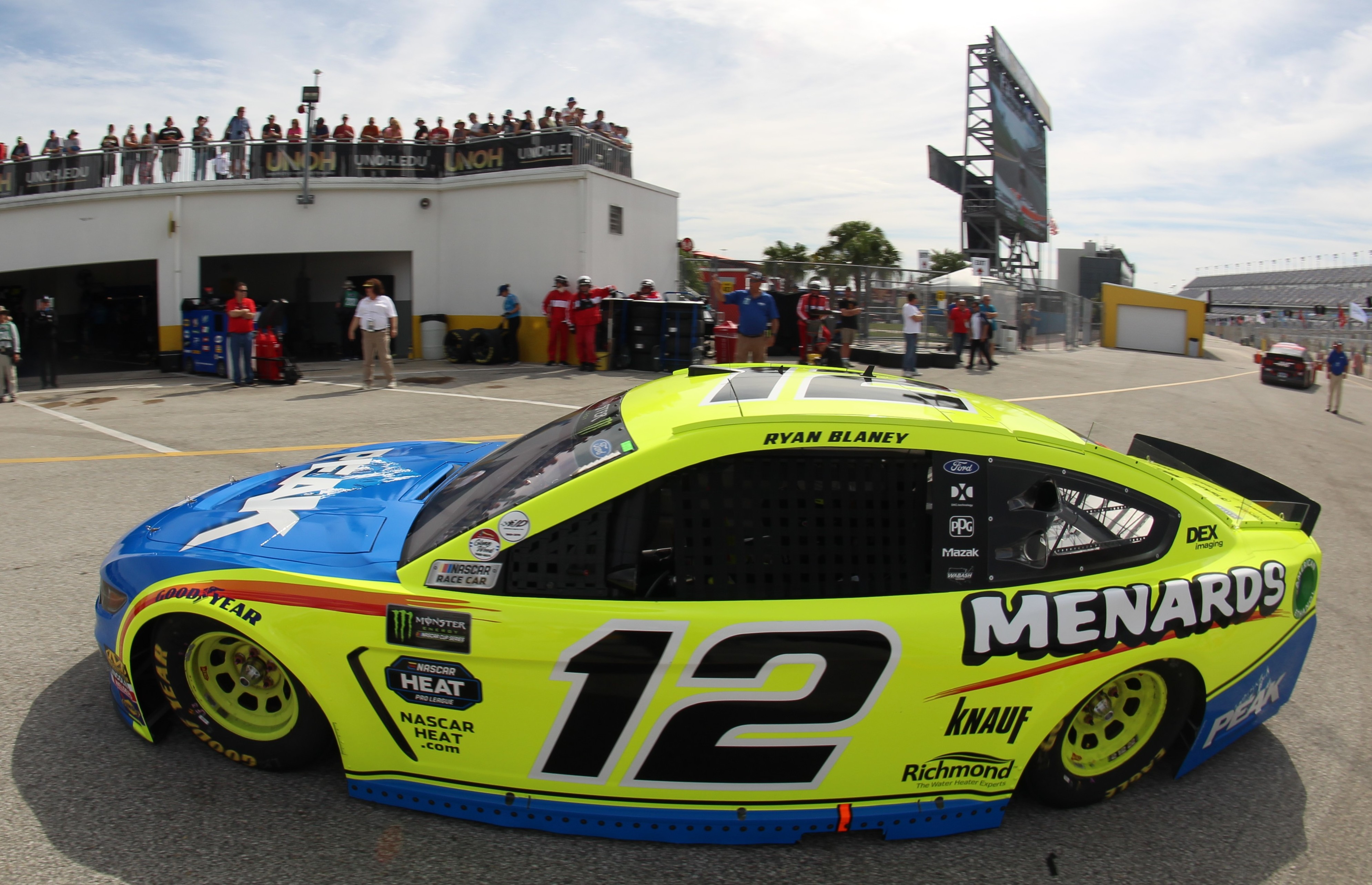
Ryan Blaney won the second stage.

Laps: 60

Pos	No	Driver	Team	Manufacturer	Points
1	12	Ryan Blaney	Team Penske	Ford	10
2	24	William Byron	Hendrick Motorsports	Chevrolet	9
3	10	Aric Almirola	Stewart–Haas Racing	Ford	8
4	2	Brad Keselowski	Team Penske	Ford	7
5	17	Ricky Stenhouse Jr.	Roush Fenway Racing	Ford	6
6	95	Matt DiBenedetto	Leavine Family Racing	Toyota	5
7	4	Kevin Harvick	Stewart–Haas Racing	Ford	4
8	41	Daniel Suárez	Stewart–Haas Racing	Ford	3
9	48	Jimmie Johnson	Hendrick Motorsports	Chevrolet	2
10	22	Joey Logano	Team Penske	Ford	1
Official stage two results

=== Final Stage Results ===
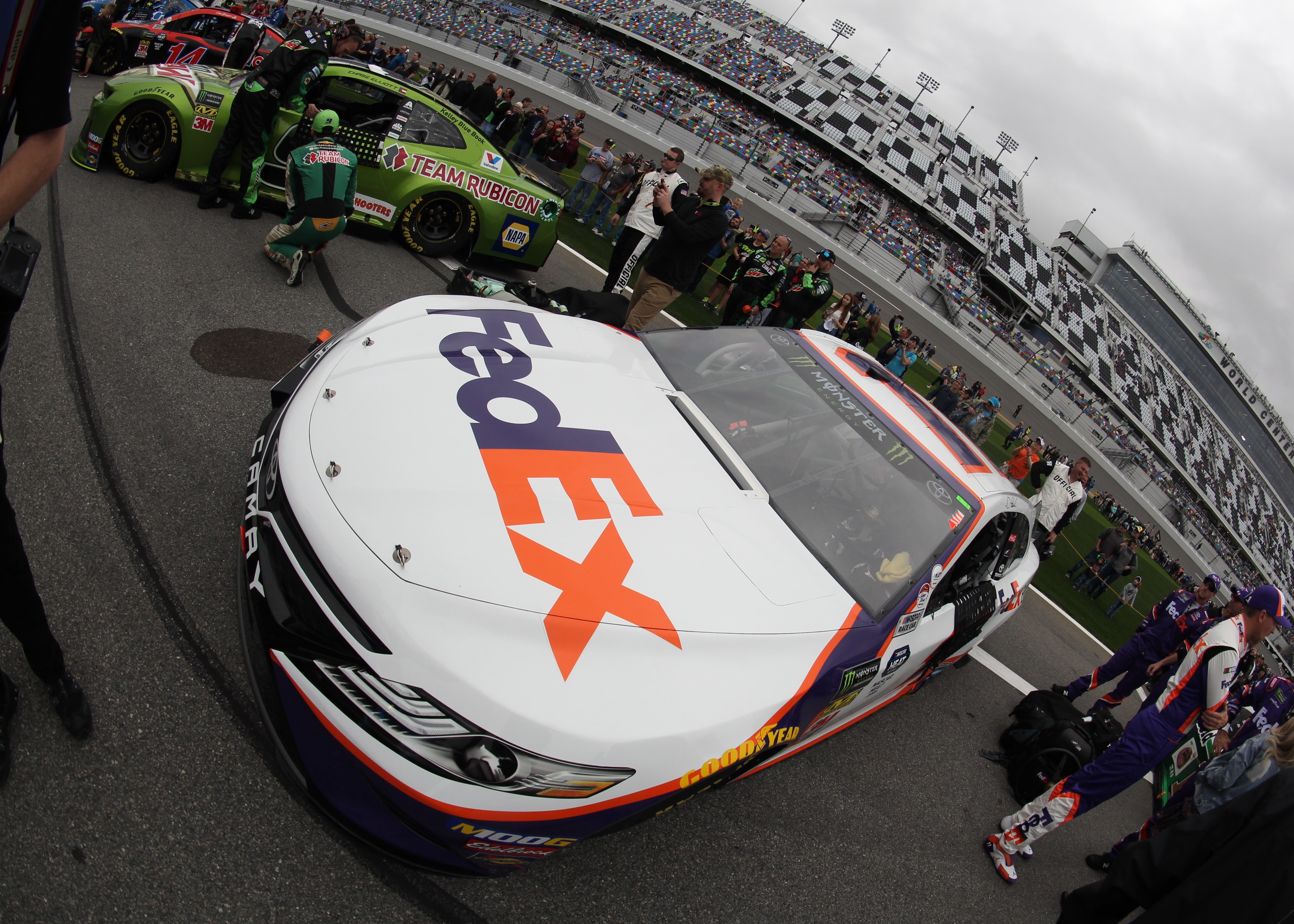
Denny Hamlin won the race.

Laps: 80

Pos	Grid	No	Driver	Team	Manufacturer	Laps	Points
1	10	11	Denny Hamlin	Joe Gibbs Racing	Toyota	207	45
2	31	18	Kyle Busch	Joe Gibbs Racing	Toyota	207	45
3	28	20	Erik Jones	Joe Gibbs Racing	Toyota	207	35
4	4	22	Joey Logano	Team Penske	Ford	207	42
5	34	34	Michael McDowell	Front Row Motorsports	Ford	207	32
6	22	13	Ty Dillon	Germain Racing	Chevrolet	207	31
7	26	42	Kyle Larson	Chip Ganassi Racing	Chevrolet	207	33
8	21	47	Ryan Preece (R)	JTG Daugherty Racing	Chevrolet	207	29
9	17	48	Jimmie Johnson	Hendrick Motorsports	Chevrolet	207	30
10	36	15	Ross Chastain (i)	Premium Motorsports	Chevrolet	207	0
11	2	88	Alex Bowman	Hendrick Motorsports	Chevrolet	207	35
12	35	2	Brad Keselowski	Team Penske	Ford	207	32
13	5	17	Ricky Stenhouse Jr.	Roush Fenway Racing	Ford	207	30
14	19	6	Ryan Newman	Roush Fenway Racing	Ford	207	23
15	25	96	Parker Kligerman (i)	Gaunt Brothers Racing	Toyota	205	0
16	20	3	Austin Dillon	Richard Childress Racing	Chevrolet	205	21
17	18	9	Chase Elliott	Hendrick Motorsports	Chevrolet	200	24
18	32	32	Corey LaJoie	Go Fas Racing	Ford	200	19
19	38	51	B. J. McLeod (i)	Petty Ware Racing	Chevrolet	200	0
20	6	14	Clint Bowyer	Stewart–Haas Racing	Ford	199	17
21	1	24	William Byron	Hendrick Motorsports	Chevrolet	198	25
22	16	40	Jamie McMurray	Spire Motorsports	Chevrolet	198	15
23	30	62	Brendan Gaughan (i)	Beard Motorsports	Chevrolet	197	0
24	27	00	Landon Cassill	StarCom Racing	Chevrolet	196	13
25	12	1	Kurt Busch	Chip Ganassi Racing	Chevrolet	196	12
26	3	4	Kevin Harvick	Stewart–Haas Racing	Ford	194	17
27	39	31	Tyler Reddick (i)	Richard Childress Racing	Chevrolet	191	0
28	9	95	Matt DiBenedetto	Leavine Family Racing	Toyota	190	14
29	7	21	Paul Menard	Wood Brothers Racing	Ford	190	8
30	24	38	David Ragan	Front Row Motorsports	Ford	190	7
31	14	12	Ryan Blaney	Team Penske	Ford	190	22
32	8	10	Aric Almirola	Stewart–Haas Racing	Ford	190	13
33	23	41	Daniel Suárez	Stewart–Haas Racing	Ford	190	14
34	29	8	Daniel Hemric (R)	Richard Childress Racing	Chevrolet	190	3
35	11	19	Martin Truex Jr.	Joe Gibbs Racing	Toyota	190	2
36	33	36	Matt Tifft (R)	Front Row Motorsports	Ford	190	1
37	15	37	Chris Buescher	JTG Daugherty Racing	Chevrolet	190	1
38	13	43	Bubba Wallace	Richard Petty Motorsports	Chevrolet	169	1
39	37	52	Cody Ware (R)	Rick Ware Racing	Chevrolet	155	1
40	40	27	Casey Mears	Germain Racing	Chevrolet	104	1
Official race results

=== Race statistics ===
- Lead changes: 15 among 9 different drivers
- Cautions/Laps: 12 for 47
- Red flags: 2 for 39 minutes and 38 seconds
- Time of race: 3 hours, 45 minutes and 55 seconds
- Average speed: 132.792 miles per hour (213.708 km/h)

== Media ==
=== Television ===
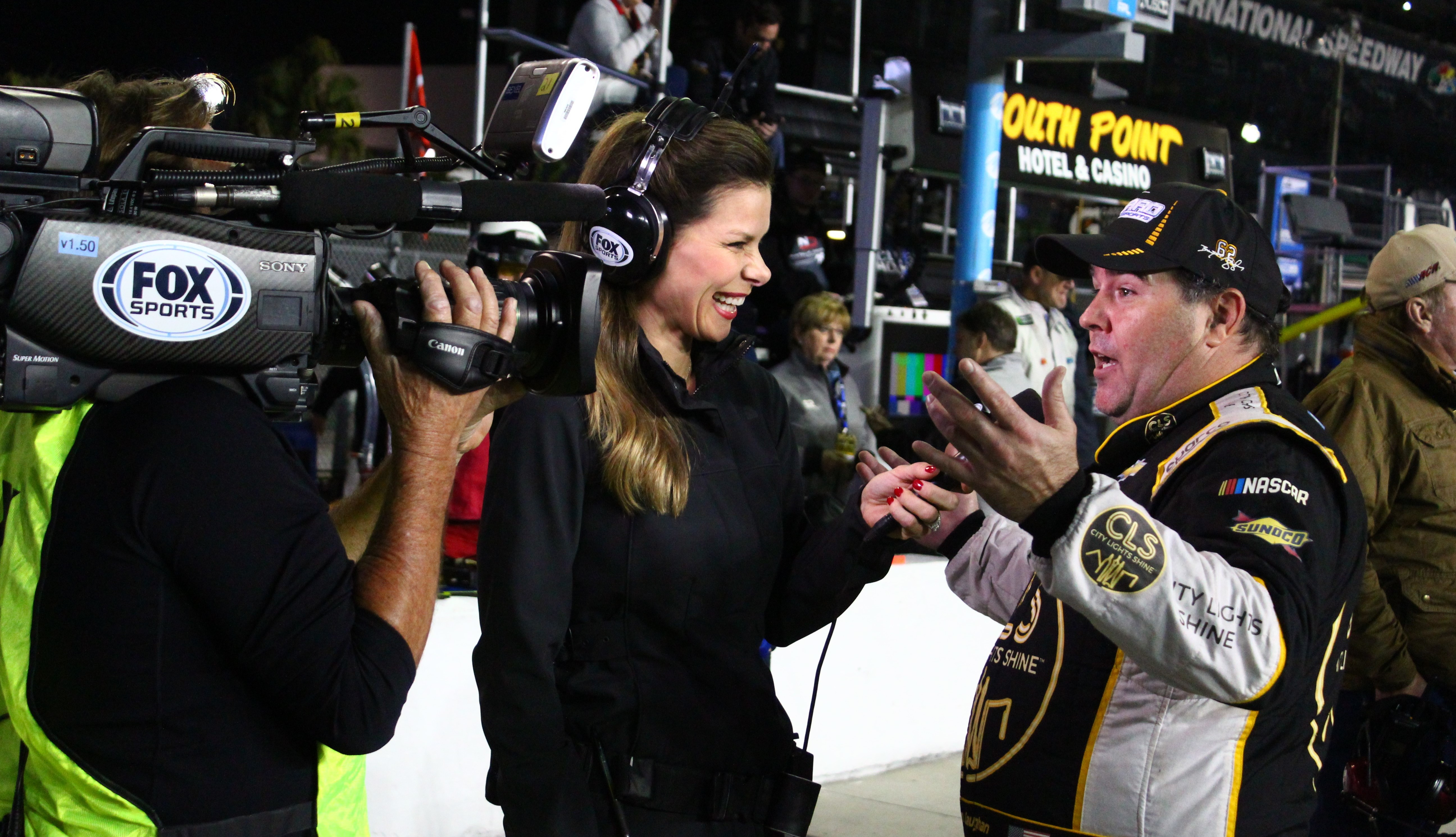
Jamie Little interviewing Brendan Gaughan in this race

Since 2001—with the exception of 2002, 2004 and 2006—the Daytona 500 has been carried by Fox in the United States. The booth crew consisted of longtime NASCAR lap-by-lap announcer Mike Joy, three–time Daytona 500 winner Jeff Gordon, and for the final time 1989 race winner Darrell Waltrip. Pit road was manned by Jamie Little, Regan Smith, Vince Welch and Matt Yocum.

Fox Television
Booth announcers	Pit reporters
Lap-by-lap: Mike Joy; Color-commentator: Jeff Gordon; Color commentator: Darrell Waltrip	Jamie Little; Regan Smith; Vince Welch; Matt Yocum

Spanish-language network Fox Sports LA aired the race live, with lap-by-lap announcer Jessi Losada and color analyst Rodolfo Landeros.

=== Radio ===
The race was broadcast on radio by the Motor Racing Network and simulcast on SiriusXM's NASCAR Radio. The booth crew was consisted of Alex Hayden, Jeff Striegle and 1989 Cup Series champion Rusty Wallace. Longtime turn announcer Dave Moody was the lead turn announcer. He called the Daytona 500 from atop the Sunoco tower outside the exit of turn 2 when the field raced through turns 1 and 2. Mike Bagley worked the backstretch for the Daytona 500 from a spotter's stand on the inside of the track & Kyle Rickey called the Daytona 500 when the field raced through turns 3 and 4 from the Sunoco tower outside the exit of turn 4. On pit road, MRN was manned by lead pit reporter and NASCAR Hall of Fame Executive Director Winston Kelley. He will be joined on pit road by Steve Post, Kim Coon, and Dillon Welch.

MRN Radio
Booth announcers	Turn announcers	Pit reporters
Lead announcer: Alex Hayden; Announcer: Jeff Striegle; Announcer: Rusty Wallace	Turns 1 & 2: Dave Moody; Backstretch: Mike Bagley; Turns 3 & 4: Kyle Rickey	Winston Kelley; Steve Post; Dillon Welch; Kim Coon

== Standings after the race ==
Drivers' Championship standings

Pos	Driver	Points
1	Denny Hamlin	52
1	Joey Logano	52
3	Kyle Busch	45 (–7)
4	Ricky Stenhouse Jr.	39 (–13)
5	Erik Jones	35 (–17)
5	Alex Bowman	35 (–17)
7	Kyle Larson	33 (–19)
7	Jimmie Johnson	33 (–19)
9	Michael McDowell	32 (–20)
9	Ty Dillon	32 (–20)
9	Brad Keselowski	32 (–20)
12	Ryan Preece	30 (–22)
13	Chase Elliott	27 (–25)
13	Kevin Harvick	27 (–25)
13	Ryan Blaney	27 (–25)
16	Clint Bowyer	26 (–26)
Official driver's standings

Manufacturers' Championship standings

Pos	Manufacturer	Points
1	Toyota	40
2	Ford	33 (–7)
3	Chevrolet	31 (–9)

- Note: Only the first 16 positions are included for the driver standings.

Previous race: 2018 Ford EcoBoost 400	Monster Energy NASCAR Cup Series; 2019 season	Next race: 2019 Folds of Honor QuikTrip 500
