= 2018 Toyota Owners 400 =

Race details
- Race 9 of 36 in the 2018 Monster Energy NASCAR Cup Series
- Date: April 21, 2018
- Location: Richmond Raceway in Richmond, Virginia
- Course: Permanent racing facility
- Course length: 0.75 miles (1.207 km)
- Distance: 402 laps, 301.5 mi (485.217 km)
- Scheduled distance: 400 laps, 300 mi (482.803 km)
- Average speed: 96.215 miles per hour (154.843 km/h)

Pole position
| Driver | Martin Truex Jr. | Furniture Row Racing |
- Time: 21.799

Most laps led
| Driver | Martin Truex Jr. | Furniture Row Racing |
- Laps: 121

Winner
| No. 18 | Kyle Busch | Joe Gibbs Racing |

Television in the United States
- Network: Fox
- Announcers: Mike Joy, Jeff Gordon and Darrell Waltrip
- Nielsen ratings: 1.7 (Overnight)

Radio in the United States
- Radio: MRN
- Booth announcers: Joe Moore, Jeff Striegle and Rusty Wallace
- Turn announcers: Mike Bagley (Backstretch)

The 2018 Toyota Owners 400 was a Monster Energy NASCAR Cup Series race held on April 21, 2018, at Richmond Raceway in Richmond, Virginia. Contested over 402 laps – extended from 400 laps due to an overtime finish – on the 0.75-mile (1.21-kilometre) asphalt short track, it was the ninth race of the 2018 Monster Energy NASCAR Cup Series season.

Joe Gibbs Racing driver Kyle Busch took his third successive victory, having started from 32nd on the grid, taking the race lead at the final round of pit stops.

== Report ==
=== Background ===
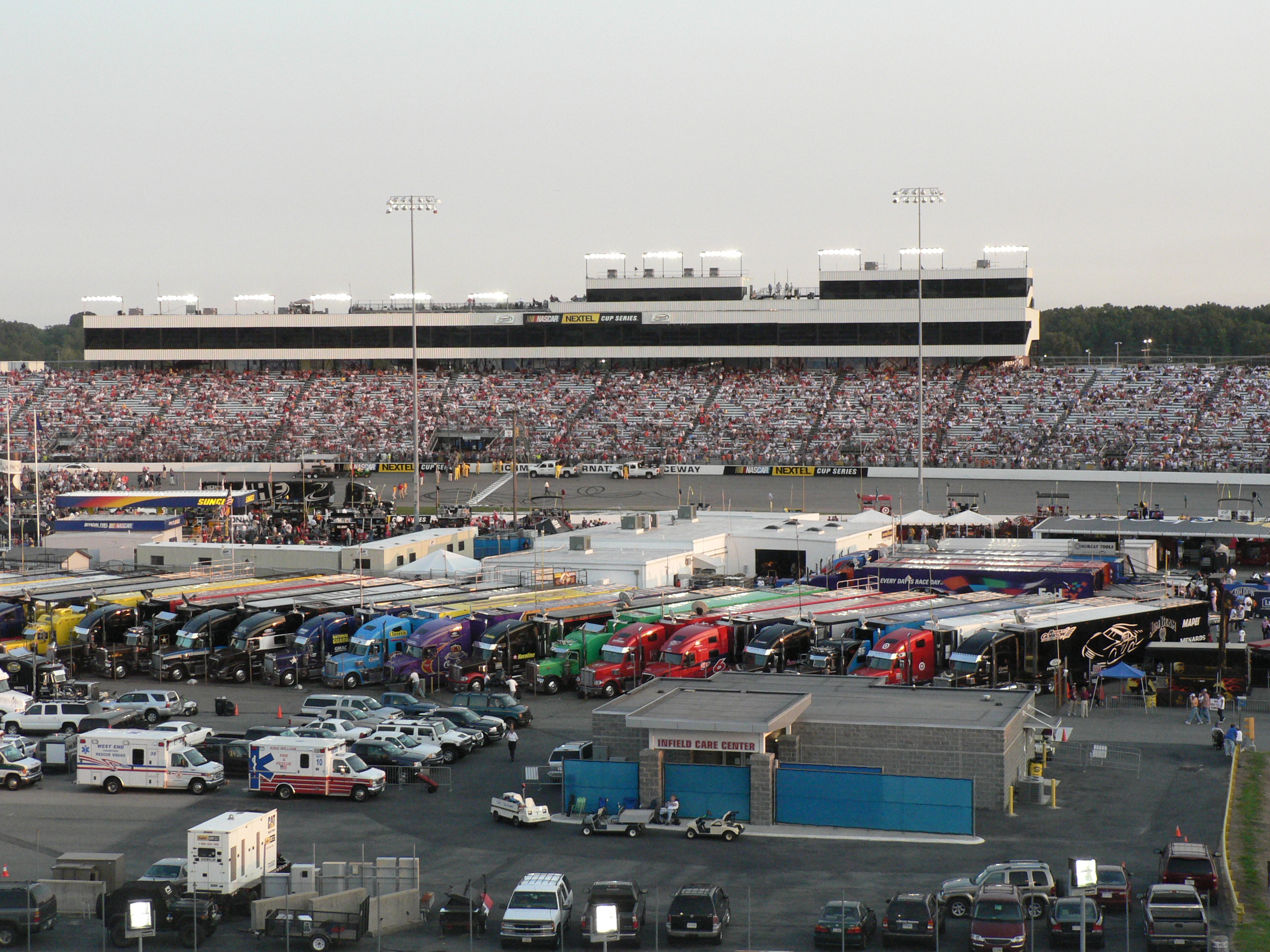
Richmond Raceway, the track where the race was held.

Richmond Raceway is a 0.75-mile (1.21-kilometre), D-shaped, asphalt race track located just outside Richmond, Virginia in Henrico County. Known as "America's premier short track", it has hosted all three NASCAR national series, an IndyCar Series race, and two USAC sprint car races.

==== Entry list ====
| No. | Driver | Team | Manufacturer |
|---|---|---|---|
| 00 | Landon Cassill | StarCom Racing | Chevrolet |
| 1 | Jamie McMurray | Chip Ganassi Racing | Chevrolet |
| 2 | Brad Keselowski | Team Penske | Ford |
| 3 | Austin Dillon | Richard Childress Racing | Chevrolet |
| 4 | Kevin Harvick | Stewart–Haas Racing | Ford |
| 6 | Trevor Bayne | Roush Fenway Racing | Ford |
| 8 | Daniel Hemric (i) | Richard Childress Racing | Chevrolet |
| 9 | Chase Elliott | Hendrick Motorsports | Chevrolet |
| 10 | Aric Almirola | Stewart–Haas Racing | Ford |
| 11 | Denny Hamlin | Joe Gibbs Racing | Toyota |
| 12 | Ryan Blaney | Team Penske | Ford |
| 13 | Ty Dillon | Germain Racing | Chevrolet |
| 14 | Clint Bowyer | Stewart–Haas Racing | Ford |
| 15 | Ross Chastain (i) | Premium Motorsports | Chevrolet |
| 17 | Ricky Stenhouse Jr. | Roush Fenway Racing | Ford |
| 18 | Kyle Busch | Joe Gibbs Racing | Toyota |
| 19 | Daniel Suárez | Joe Gibbs Racing | Toyota |
| 20 | Erik Jones | Joe Gibbs Racing | Toyota |
| 21 | Paul Menard | Wood Brothers Racing | Ford |
| 22 | Joey Logano | Team Penske | Ford |
| 23 | Gray Gaulding | BK Racing | Toyota |
| 24 | William Byron (R) | Hendrick Motorsports | Chevrolet |
| 31 | Ryan Newman | Richard Childress Racing | Chevrolet |
| 32 | Matt DiBenedetto | Go Fas Racing | Ford |
| 34 | Michael McDowell | Front Row Motorsports | Ford |
| 37 | Chris Buescher | JTG Daugherty Racing | Chevrolet |
| 38 | David Ragan | Front Row Motorsports | Ford |
| 41 | Kurt Busch | Stewart–Haas Racing | Ford |
| 42 | Kyle Larson | Chip Ganassi Racing | Chevrolet |
| 43 | Bubba Wallace (R) | Richard Petty Motorsports | Chevrolet |
| 47 | A. J. Allmendinger | JTG Daugherty Racing | Chevrolet |
| 48 | Jimmie Johnson | Hendrick Motorsports | Chevrolet |
| 51 | Harrison Rhodes | Rick Ware Racing | Chevrolet |
| 55 | Reed Sorenson | Premium Motorsports | Chevrolet |
| 72 | Cole Whitt | TriStar Motorsports | Chevrolet |
| 78 | Martin Truex Jr. | Furniture Row Racing | Toyota |
| 88 | Alex Bowman | Hendrick Motorsports | Chevrolet |
| 95 | Kasey Kahne | Leavine Family Racing | Chevrolet |
Official entry list

== Practice ==
=== First practice ===
Chase Elliott was the fastest in the first practice session with a time of 22.254 seconds and a speed of 121.327 mph (195.257 km/h).

| Pos | No. | Driver | Team | Manufacturer | Time | Speed |
|---|---|---|---|---|---|---|
| 1 | 9 | Chase Elliott | Hendrick Motorsports | Chevrolet | 22.254 | 121.327 |
| 2 | 42 | Kyle Larson | Chip Ganassi Racing | Chevrolet | 22.300 | 121.076 |
| 3 | 78 | Martin Truex Jr. | Furniture Row Racing | Toyota | 22.359 | 120.757 |
Official first practice results

=== Final practice ===
Kyle Larson was the fastest in the final practice session with a time of 22.441 seconds and a speed of 120.315 mph (193.628 km/h).

| Pos | No. | Driver | Team | Manufacturer | Time | Speed |
|---|---|---|---|---|---|---|
| 1 | 42 | Kyle Larson | Chip Ganassi Racing | Chevrolet | 22.441 | 120.315 |
| 2 | 43 | Bubba Wallace (R) | Richard Petty Motorsports | Chevrolet | 22.509 | 119.952 |
| 3 | 1 | Jamie McMurray | Chip Ganassi Racing | Chevrolet | 22.518 | 119.904 |
Official final practice results

== Qualifying ==
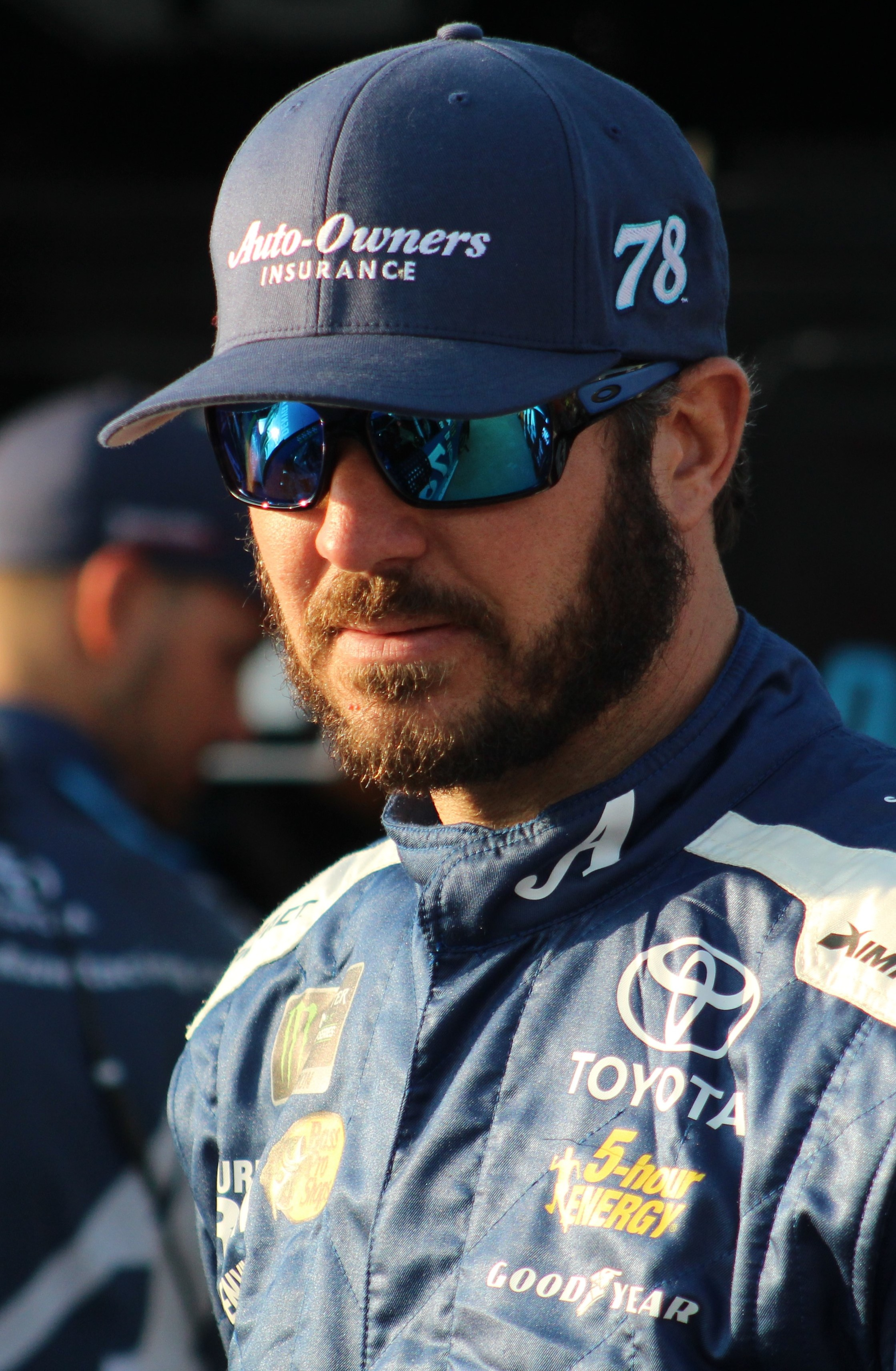
Martin Truex Jr. scored the pole position.

Martin Truex Jr. scored the pole for the race with a time of 21.799 and a speed of 123.859 mph (199.332 km/h).

=== Qualifying results ===
| Pos | No. | Driver | Team | Manufacturer | R1 | R2 | R3 |
|---|---|---|---|---|---|---|---|
| 1 | 78 | Martin Truex Jr. | Furniture Row Racing | Toyota | 21.752 | 21.785 | 21.799 |
| 2 | 9 | Chase Elliott | Hendrick Motorsports | Chevrolet | 21.911 | 21.698 | 21.841 |
| 3 | 22 | Joey Logano | Team Penske | Ford | 21.853 | 21.717 | 21.848 |
| 4 | 11 | Denny Hamlin | Joe Gibbs Racing | Toyota | 21.827 | 21.691 | 21.855 |
| 5 | 42 | Kyle Larson | Chip Ganassi Racing | Chevrolet | 21.870 | 21.839 | 21.912 |
| 6 | 41 | Kurt Busch | Stewart–Haas Racing | Ford | 21.882 | 21.807 | 21.969 |
| 7 | 20 | Erik Jones | Joe Gibbs Racing | Toyota | 21.854 | 21.910 | 21.974 |
| 8 | 1 | Jamie McMurray | Chip Ganassi Racing | Chevrolet | 21.863 | 21.799 | 21.982 |
| 9 | 24 | William Byron (R) | Hendrick Motorsports | Chevrolet | 21.793 | 21.823 | 21.985 |
| 10 | 4 | Kevin Harvick | Stewart–Haas Racing | Ford | 21.878 | 21.832 | 21.986 |
| 11 | 88 | Alex Bowman | Hendrick Motorsports | Chevrolet | 21.955 | 21.820 | 21.999 |
| 12 | 17 | Ricky Stenhouse Jr. | Roush Fenway Racing | Ford | 21.936 | 21.815 | 22.059 |
| 13 | 12 | Ryan Blaney | Team Penske | Ford | 21.934 | 21.940 | — |
| 14 | 31 | Ryan Newman | Richard Childress Racing | Chevrolet | 21.879 | 21.978 | — |
| 15 | 38 | David Ragan | Front Row Motorsports | Ford | 21.875 | 21.978 | — |
| 16 | 14 | Clint Bowyer | Stewart–Haas Racing | Ford | 21.837 | 21.979 | — |
| 17 | 48 | Jimmie Johnson | Hendrick Motorsports | Chevrolet | 21.807 | 21.990 | — |
| 18 | 43 | Bubba Wallace (R) | Richard Petty Motorsports | Chevrolet | 21.940 | 21.991 | — |
| 19 | 37 | Chris Buescher | JTG Daugherty Racing | Chevrolet | 21.895 | 22.034 | — |
| 20 | 21 | Paul Menard | Wood Brothers Racing | Ford | 21.922 | 22.039 | — |
| 21 | 6 | Trevor Bayne | Roush Fenway Racing | Ford | 21.854 | 22.052 | — |
| 22 | 8 | Daniel Hemric (i) | Richard Childress Racing | Chevrolet | 21.951 | 22.061 | — |
| 23 | 3 | Austin Dillon | Richard Childress Racing | Chevrolet | 21.903 | 22.067 | — |
| 24 | 34 | Michael McDowell | Front Row Motorsports | Ford | 21.899 | 22.091 | — |
| 25 | 10 | Aric Almirola | Stewart–Haas Racing | Ford | 21.957 | — | — |
| 26 | 19 | Daniel Suárez | Joe Gibbs Racing | Toyota | 21.963 | — | — |
| 27 | 32 | Matt DiBenedetto | Go Fas Racing | Ford | 21.992 | — | — |
| 28 | 2 | Brad Keselowski | Team Penske | Ford | 22.001 | — | — |
| 29 | 15 | Ross Chastain (i) | Premium Motorsports | Chevrolet | 22.015 | — | — |
| 30 | 95 | Kasey Kahne | Leavine Family Racing | Chevrolet | 22.055 | — | — |
| 31 | 13 | Ty Dillon | Germain Racing | Chevrolet | 22.063 | — | — |
| 32 | 18 | Kyle Busch | Joe Gibbs Racing | Toyota | 22.069 | — | — |
| 33 | 47 | A. J. Allmendinger | JTG Daugherty Racing | Chevrolet | 22.083 | — | — |
| 34 | 23 | Gray Gaulding | BK Racing | Toyota | 22.194 | — | — |
| 35 | 72 | Cole Whitt | TriStar Motorsports | Chevrolet | 22.236 | — | — |
| 36 | 00 | Landon Cassill | StarCom Racing | Chevrolet | 22.314 | — | — |
| 37 | 55 | Reed Sorenson | Premium Motorsports | Chevrolet | 22.548 | — | — |
| 38 | 51 | Harrison Rhodes | Rick Ware Racing | Chevrolet | 22.555 | — | — |
Official qualifying results

== Race results ==
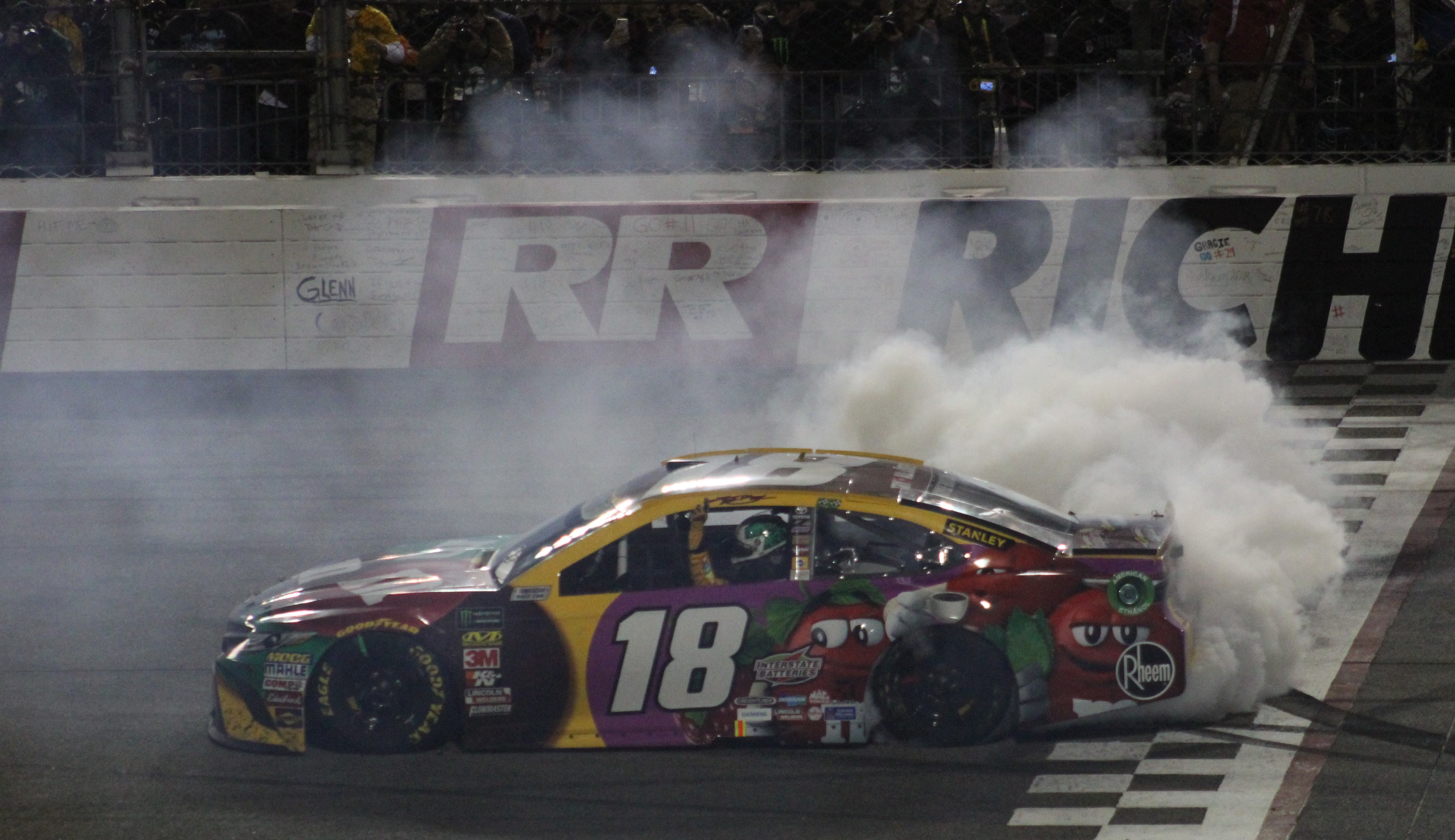
Kyle Busch celebrating after winning the 2018 Toyota Owners 400.

=== Stage results ===
Stage 1 Laps: 100

| Pos | No | Driver | Team | Manufacturer | Points |
|---|---|---|---|---|---|
| 1 | 22 | Joey Logano | Team Penske | Ford | 10 |
| 2 | 10 | Aric Almirola | Stewart–Haas Racing | Ford | 9 |
| 3 | 41 | Kurt Busch | Stewart–Haas Racing | Ford | 8 |
| 4 | 24 | William Byron (R) | Hendrick Motorsports | Chevrolet | 7 |
| 5 | 14 | Clint Bowyer | Stewart–Haas Racing | Ford | 6 |
| 6 | 18 | Kyle Busch | Joe Gibbs Racing | Toyota | 5 |
| 7 | 9 | Chase Elliott | Hendrick Motorsports | Chevrolet | 4 |
| 8 | 3 | Austin Dillon | Richard Childress Racing | Chevrolet | 3 |
| 9 | 78 | Martin Truex Jr. | Furniture Row Racing | Toyota | 2 |
| 10 | 4 | Kevin Harvick | Stewart–Haas Racing | Ford | 1 |
Official stage one results

Stage 2 Laps: 100

| Pos | No | Driver | Team | Manufacturer | Points |
|---|---|---|---|---|---|
| 1 | 22 | Joey Logano | Team Penske | Ford | 10 |
| 2 | 14 | Clint Bowyer | Stewart–Haas Racing | Ford | 9 |
| 3 | 10 | Aric Almirola | Stewart–Haas Racing | Ford | 8 |
| 4 | 41 | Kurt Busch | Stewart–Haas Racing | Ford | 7 |
| 5 | 24 | William Byron (R) | Hendrick Motorsports | Chevrolet | 6 |
| 6 | 18 | Kyle Busch | Joe Gibbs Racing | Toyota | 5 |
| 7 | 31 | Ryan Newman | Richard Childress Racing | Chevrolet | 4 |
| 8 | 2 | Brad Keselowski | Team Penske | Ford | 3 |
| 9 | 78 | Martin Truex Jr. | Furniture Row Racing | Toyota | 2 |
| 10 | 4 | Kevin Harvick | Stewart–Haas Racing | Ford | 1 |
Official stage two results

=== Final stage results ===
Stage 3 Laps: 202

| Pos | Grid | No | Driver | Team | Manufacturer | Laps | Points |
|---|---|---|---|---|---|---|---|
| 1 | 32 | 18 | Kyle Busch | Joe Gibbs Racing | Toyota | 402 | 50 |
| 2 | 2 | 9 | Chase Elliott | Hendrick Motorsports | Chevrolet | 402 | 39 |
| 3 | 4 | 11 | Denny Hamlin | Joe Gibbs Racing | Toyota | 402 | 34 |
| 4 | 3 | 22 | Joey Logano | Team Penske | Ford | 402 | 53 |
| 5 | 10 | 4 | Kevin Harvick | Stewart–Haas Racing | Ford | 402 | 34 |
| 6 | 17 | 48 | Jimmie Johnson | Hendrick Motorsports | Chevrolet | 402 | 31 |
| 7 | 5 | 42 | Kyle Larson | Chip Ganassi Racing | Chevrolet | 402 | 30 |
| 8 | 28 | 2 | Brad Keselowski | Team Penske | Ford | 402 | 32 |
| 9 | 16 | 14 | Clint Bowyer | Stewart–Haas Racing | Ford | 402 | 43 |
| 10 | 26 | 19 | Daniel Suárez | Joe Gibbs Racing | Toyota | 402 | 27 |
| 11 | 6 | 41 | Kurt Busch | Stewart–Haas Racing | Ford | 402 | 41 |
| 12 | 9 | 24 | William Byron (R) | Hendrick Motorsports | Chevrolet | 402 | 38 |
| 13 | 7 | 20 | Erik Jones | Joe Gibbs Racing | Toyota | 402 | 24 |
| 14 | 1 | 78 | Martin Truex Jr. | Furniture Row Racing | Toyota | 402 | 27 |
| 15 | 23 | 3 | Austin Dillon | Richard Childress Racing | Chevrolet | 402 | 25 |
| 16 | 27 | 32 | Matt DiBenedetto | Go Fas Racing | Ford | 402 | 21 |
| 17 | 25 | 10 | Aric Almirola | Stewart–Haas Racing | Ford | 402 | 37 |
| 18 | 11 | 88 | Alex Bowman | Hendrick Motorsports | Chevrolet | 402 | 19 |
| 19 | 8 | 1 | Jamie McMurray | Chip Ganassi Racing | Chevrolet | 402 | 18 |
| 20 | 31 | 13 | Ty Dillon | Germain Racing | Chevrolet | 402 | 17 |
| 21 | 21 | 6 | Trevor Bayne | Roush Fenway Racing | Ford | 402 | 16 |
| 22 | 13 | 12 | Ryan Blaney | Team Penske | Ford | 402 | 15 |
| 23 | 12 | 17 | Ricky Stenhouse Jr. | Roush Fenway Racing | Ford | 402 | 14 |
| 24 | 20 | 21 | Paul Menard | Wood Brothers Racing | Ford | 401 | 13 |
| 25 | 18 | 43 | Bubba Wallace (R) | Richard Petty Motorsports | Chevrolet | 401 | 12 |
| 26 | 19 | 37 | Chris Buescher | JTG Daugherty Racing | Chevrolet | 401 | 11 |
| 27 | 33 | 47 | A. J. Allmendinger | JTG Daugherty Racing | Chevrolet | 401 | 10 |
| 28 | 30 | 15 | Ross Chastain (i) | Premium Motorsports | Chevrolet | 401 | 0 |
| 29 | 29 | 95 | Kasey Kahne | Leavine Family Racing | Chevrolet | 400 | 8 |
| 30 | 35 | 72 | Cole Whitt | TriStar Motorsports | Chevrolet | 400 | 7 |
| 31 | 24 | 34 | Michael McDowell | Front Row Motorsports | Ford | 400 | 6 |
| 32 | 22 | 8 | Daniel Hemric (i) | Richard Childress Racing | Chevrolet | 399 | 0 |
| 33 | 15 | 38 | David Ragan | Front Row Motorsports | Ford | 399 | 4 |
| 34 | 36 | 00 | Landon Cassill | StarCom Racing | Chevrolet | 397 | 3 |
| 35 | 34 | 23 | Gray Gaulding | BK Racing | Toyota | 393 | 2 |
| 36 | 38 | 51 | Harrison Rhodes | Rick Ware Racing | Chevrolet | 386 | 1 |
| 37 | 14 | 31 | Ryan Newman | Richard Childress Racing | Chevrolet | 368 | 5 |
| 38 | 37 | 55 | Reed Sorenson | Premium Motorsports | Chevrolet | 188 | 1 |
Official race results

=== Race statistics ===
- Lead changes: 16 among 7 different drivers
- Cautions/Laps: 6 for 46 laps
- Red flags: 0
- Time of race: 3 hours, 8 minutes and 1 second
- Average speed: 96.215 miles per hour (154.843 km/h)

== Media ==
=== Television ===
Fox Sports covered their 18th race at Richmond Raceway. Mike Joy, two-time Richmond winner Jeff Gordon and six-time Richmond winner Darrell Waltrip called the race from the broadcast booth, while Regan Smith, Vince Welch and Matt Yocum handled pit road duties.

Fox Television
| Booth announcers | Pit reporters |
|---|---|
| Lap-by-lap: Mike Joy; Color commentator: Jeff Gordon; Color commentator: Darrell Waltrip | Regan Smith; Vince Welch; Matt Yocum |

=== Radio ===
MRN had the radio call for the race which was also simulcast on SiriusXM's NASCAR Radio channel. Joe Moore, Jeff Striegle and six-time Richmond winner Rusty Wallace called the race in the booth when the field raced down the frontstretch. Mike Bagley called the race from a platform inside the backstretch when the field raced down the backstretch, while Winston Kelley, Alex Hayden and Glenn Jarrett worked pit road.

MRN Radio
| Booth announcers | Turn announcers | Pit reporters |
|---|---|---|
| Lead announcer: Joe Moore; Announcer: Jeff Striegle; Announcer: Rusty Wallace | Backstretch: Mike Bagley | Winston Kelley; Alex Hayden; Glenn Jarrett |

== Standings after the race ==
Drivers' Championship standings

| | Pos | Driver | Points |
|---|---|---|---|
| | 1 | Kyle Busch | 415 |
| | 2 | Joey Logano | 359 (–56) |
| 1 | 3 | Clint Bowyer | 329 (–86) |
| 1 | 4 | Kevin Harvick | 324 (–91) |
| | 5 | Brad Keselowski | 303 (–112) |
| 2 | 6 | Denny Hamlin | 286 (–129) |
| | 7 | Martin Truex Jr. | 284 (–131) |
| 2 | 8 | Ryan Blaney | 282 (–133) |
| 1 | 9 | Kurt Busch | 282 (–133) |
| 1 | 10 | Kyle Larson | 279 (–136) |
| | 11 | Aric Almirola | 248 (–167) |
| | 12 | Erik Jones | 233 (–182) |
| | 13 | Alex Bowman | 209 (–206) |
| | 14 | Austin Dillon | 208 (–207) |
| 2 | 15 | Jimmie Johnson | 200 (–215) |
| 3 | 16 | William Byron | 192 (–223) |
Official driver's standings

Manufacturers' Championship standings

| Pos | Manufacturer | Points |
|---|---|---|
| 1 | Toyota | 332 |
| 2 | Ford | 319 (–13) |
| 3 | Chevrolet | 297 (–35) |
Official manufacturers' standings

- Note: Only the first 16 positions are included for the driver standings.
- . – Driver has clinched a position in the Monster Energy NASCAR Cup Series playoffs.

| Previous race: 2018 Food City 500 | Monster Energy NASCAR Cup Series; 2018 season | Next race: 2018 GEICO 500 |
