= 2019 Coca-Cola 600 =

13th race of the 2019 Monster Energy Cup Series

Race details
- Race 13 of 36 in the 2019 Monster Energy NASCAR Cup Series
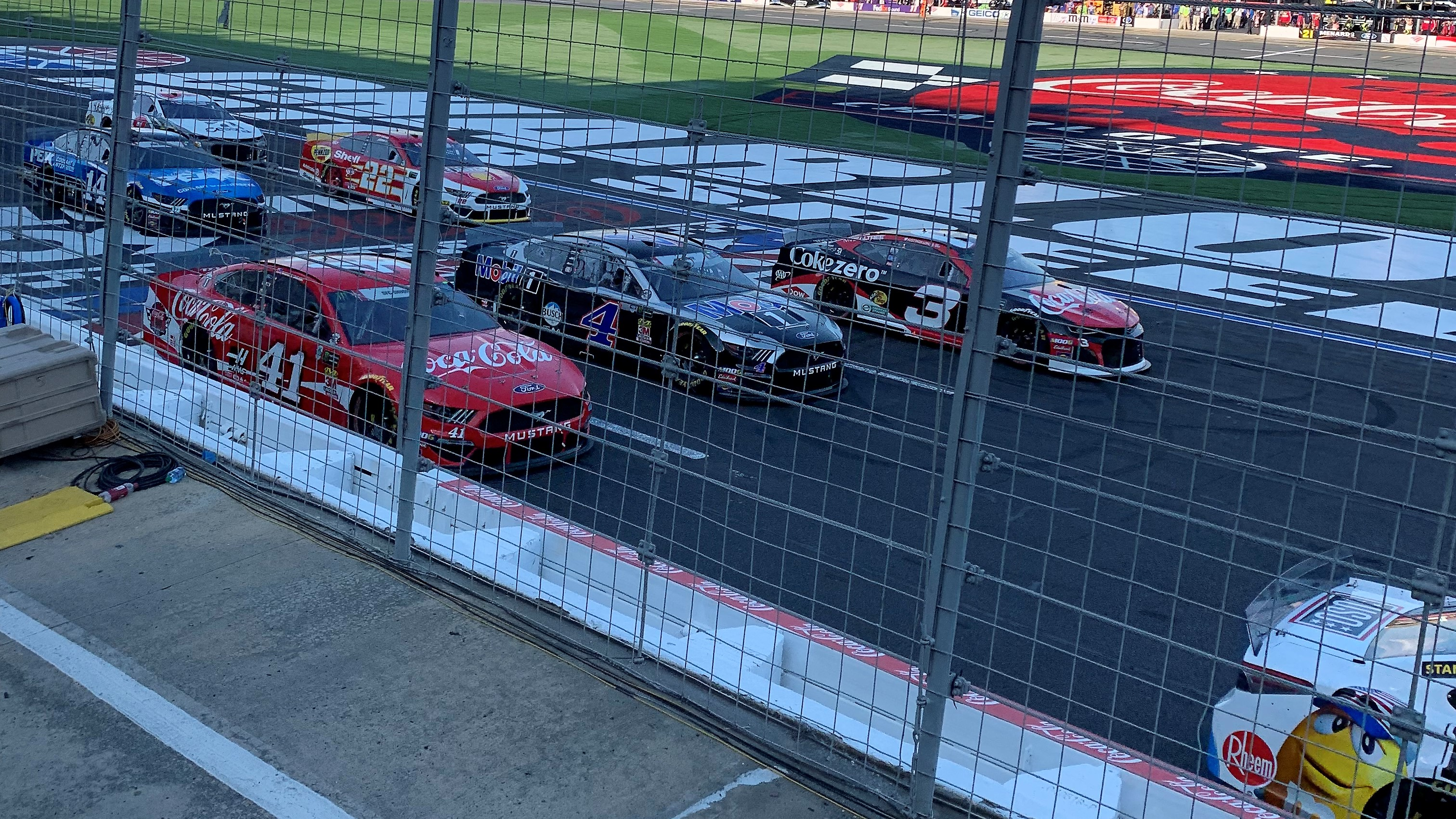
- Cars during the pace lap
- Date: May 26, 2019
- Location: Charlotte Motor Speedway in Concord, North Carolina
- Course: Permanent racing facility
- Course length: 1.5 miles (2.4 km)
- Distance: 400 laps, 600 mi (960 km)
- Average speed: 124.074 miles per hour (199.678 km/h)

Pole position
Driver	William Byron	Hendrick Motorsports
- Time: 29.440

Most laps led
Driver	Martin Truex Jr.	Joe Gibbs Racing
- Laps: 116

Winner
No. 19	Martin Truex Jr.	Joe Gibbs Racing

Television in the United States
- Network: Fox
- Announcers: Mike Joy, Jeff Gordon and Darrell Waltrip
- Nielsen ratings: 4.258 million

Radio in the United States
- Radio: PRN
- Booth announcers: Doug Rice and Mark Garrow
- Turn announcers: Rob Albright (1 & 2) and Pat Patterson (3 & 4)

The 2019 Coca-Cola 600, the 60th running of the event, was a Monster Energy NASCAR Cup Series race held on May 26, 2019, at Charlotte Motor Speedway in Concord, North Carolina. Contested over 400 laps on the 1.5 mile (2.42 km) asphalt speedway, it was the 13th race of the 2019 Monster Energy NASCAR Cup Series season. Martin Truex Jr. won his fourth race of the season, second Coca-Cola 600, and 22nd career victory overall.

== Report ==
=== Background ===
Charlotte Motor Speedway, the track where the race was held.

The race was held at Charlotte Motor Speedway, which is located in Concord, North Carolina. The speedway complex includes a 1.5-mile (2.4 km) quad-oval track that will be utilized for the race, as well as a dragstrip and a dirt track. The speedway was built in 1959 by Bruton Smith and is considered the home track for NASCAR with many race teams based in the Charlotte metropolitan area. The track is owned and operated by Speedway Motorsports Inc. (SMI) with Marcus G. Smith serving as track president.

For the race, every car on track would sport a fallen military member tribute on their cars.

==== Entry list ====
- (i) denotes driver who are ineligible for series driver points.
- (R) denotes rookie driver.

No.	Driver	Team	Manufacturer
00	Landon Cassill (i)	StarCom Racing	Chevrolet
1	Kurt Busch	Chip Ganassi Racing	Chevrolet
2	Brad Keselowski	Team Penske	Ford
3	Austin Dillon	Richard Childress Racing	Chevrolet
4	Kevin Harvick	Stewart-Haas Racing	Ford
6	Ryan Newman	Roush Fenway Racing	Ford
8	Daniel Hemric (R)	Richard Childress Racing	Chevrolet
9	Chase Elliott	Hendrick Motorsports	Chevrolet
10	Aric Almirola	Stewart-Haas Racing	Ford
11	Denny Hamlin	Joe Gibbs Racing	Toyota
12	Ryan Blaney	Team Penske	Ford
13	Ty Dillon	Germain Racing	Chevrolet
14	Clint Bowyer	Stewart-Haas Racing	Ford
15	Ross Chastain (i)	Premium Motorsports	Chevrolet
17	Ricky Stenhouse Jr.	Roush Fenway Racing	Ford
18	Kyle Busch	Joe Gibbs Racing	Toyota
19	Martin Truex Jr.	Joe Gibbs Racing	Toyota
20	Erik Jones	Joe Gibbs Racing	Toyota
21	Paul Menard	Wood Brothers Racing	Ford
22	Joey Logano	Team Penske	Ford
24	William Byron	Hendrick Motorsports	Chevrolet
27	Reed Sorenson	Premium Motorsports	Chevrolet
32	Corey LaJoie	Go Fas Racing	Ford
34	Michael McDowell	Front Row Motorsports	Ford
36	Matt Tifft (R)	Front Row Motorsports	Ford
37	Chris Buescher	JTG Daugherty Racing	Chevrolet
38	David Ragan	Front Row Motorsports	Ford
41	Daniel Suárez	Stewart-Haas Racing	Ford
42	Kyle Larson	Chip Ganassi Racing	Chevrolet
43	Bubba Wallace	Richard Petty Motorsports	Chevrolet
47	Ryan Preece (R)	JTG Daugherty Racing	Chevrolet
48	Jimmie Johnson	Hendrick Motorsports	Chevrolet
51	Cody Ware (i)	Petty Ware Racing	Ford
52	Bayley Currey (i)	Rick Ware Racing	Ford
53	B. J. McLeod (i)	Rick Ware Racing	Chevrolet
66	Joey Gase (i)	MBM Motorsports	Toyota
77	Quin Houff	Spire Motorsports	Chevrolet
88	Alex Bowman	Hendrick Motorsports	Chevrolet
95	Matt DiBenedetto	Leavine Family Racing	Toyota
96	Parker Kligerman (i)	Gaunt Brothers Racing	Toyota
Official entry list

== First practice ==
Daniel Hemric was the fastest in the first practice session with a time of 29.542 seconds and a speed of 182.791 mph (294.174 km/h).

Pos	No.	Driver	Team	Manufacturer	Time	Speed
1	8	Daniel Hemric (R)	Richard Childress Racing	Chevrolet	29.542	182.791
2	9	Chase Elliott	Hendrick Motorsports	Chevrolet	29.615	182.340
3	24	William Byron	Hendrick Motorsports	Chevrolet	29.636	182.211
Official first practice results

== Qualifying ==
William Byron scored the pole for the race with a time of 29.440 and a speed of 183.424 mph (295.192 km/h).

=== Qualifying results ===
Pos	No.	Driver	Team	Manufacturer	Time
1	24	William Byron	Hendrick Motorsports	Chevrolet	29.440
2	10	Aric Almirola	Stewart-Haas Racing	Ford	29.497
3	18	Kyle Busch	Joe Gibbs Racing	Toyota	29.519
4	3	Austin Dillon	Richard Childress Racing	Chevrolet	29.546
5	4	Kevin Harvick	Stewart-Haas Racing	Ford	29.550
6	41	Daniel Suárez	Stewart-Haas Racing	Ford	29.555
7	22	Joey Logano	Team Penske	Ford	29.560
8	14	Clint Bowyer	Stewart-Haas Racing	Ford	29.562
9	17	Ricky Stenhouse Jr.	Roush Fenway Racing	Ford	29.563
10	8	Daniel Hemric (R)	Richard Childress Racing	Chevrolet	29.588
11	1	Kurt Busch	Chip Ganassi Racing	Chevrolet	29.603
12	9	Chase Elliott	Hendrick Motorsports	Chevrolet	29.614
13	88	Alex Bowman	Hendrick Motorsports	Chevrolet	29.618
14	19	Martin Truex Jr.	Joe Gibbs Racing	Toyota	29.622
15	48	Jimmie Johnson	Hendrick Motorsports	Chevrolet	29.649
16	20	Erik Jones	Joe Gibbs Racing	Toyota	29.657
17	21	Paul Menard	Wood Brothers Racing	Ford	29.698
18	6	Ryan Newman	Roush Fenway Racing	Ford	29.736
19	12	Ryan Blaney	Team Penske	Ford	29.760
20	11	Denny Hamlin	Joe Gibbs Racing	Toyota	29.773
21	2	Brad Keselowski	Team Penske	Ford	29.781
22	37	Chris Buescher	JTG Daugherty Racing	Chevrolet	29.783
23	34	Michael McDowell	Front Row Motorsports	Ford	29.783
24	47	Ryan Preece (R)	JTG Daugherty Racing	Chevrolet	29.839
25	42	Kyle Larson	Chip Ganassi Racing	Chevrolet	29.842
26	36	Matt Tifft (R)	Front Row Motorsports	Ford	29.955
27	95	Matt DiBenedetto	Leavine Family Racing	Toyota	29.978
28	13	Ty Dillon	Germain Racing	Chevrolet	29.983
29	43	Bubba Wallace	Richard Petty Motorsports	Chevrolet	30.006
30	32	Corey LaJoie	Go Fas Racing	Ford	30.108
31	38	David Ragan	Front Row Motorsports	Ford	30.254
32	00	Landon Cassill (i)	StarCom Racing	Chevrolet	30.379
33	52	Bayley Currey (i)	Rick Ware Racing	Ford	30.437
34	96	Parker Kligerman (i)	Gaunt Brothers Racing	Toyota	30.470
35	15	Ross Chastain (i)	Premium Motorsports	Chevrolet	30.566
36	53	B. J. McLeod (i)	Rick Ware Racing	Chevrolet	30.901
37	27	Reed Sorenson	Premium Motorsports	Chevrolet	30.945
38	51	Cody Ware (i)	Petty Ware Racing	Ford	31.812
39	77	Quin Houff	Spire Motorsports	Chevrolet	31.947
40	66	Joey Gase (i)	MBM Motorsports	Toyota	32.059
Official qualifying results

== Practice (post-qualifying) ==
=== Second practice ===
Daniel Suárez was the fastest in the second practice session with a time of 29.647 seconds and a speed of 182.143 mph (293.131 km/h).

Pos	No.	Driver	Team	Manufacturer	Time	Speed
1	41	Daniel Suárez	Stewart-Haas Racing	Ford	29.647	182.143
2	18	Kyle Busch	Joe Gibbs Racing	Toyota	29.662	182.051
3	3	Austin Dillon	Richard Childress Racing	Chevrolet	29.754	181.488
Official second practice results

=== Final practice ===
Daniel Suárez was the fastest in the final practice session with a time of 29.883 seconds and a speed of 180.705 mph (290.817 km/h).

Pos	No.	Driver	Team	Manufacturer	Time	Speed
1	41	Daniel Suárez	Stewart-Haas Racing	Ford	29.883	180.705
2	8	Daniel Hemric (R)	Richard Childress Racing	Chevrolet	29.886	180.687
3	11	Denny Hamlin	Joe Gibbs Racing	Toyota	29.908	180.554
Official final practice results

== Race ==
=== Stage results ===
Stage 1 Laps: 100

Pos	No	Driver	Team	Manufacturer	Points
1	2	Brad Keselowski	Team Penske	Ford	10
2	11	Denny Hamlin	Joe Gibbs Racing	Toyota	9
3	18	Kyle Busch	Joe Gibbs Racing	Toyota	8
4	9	Chase Elliott	Hendrick Motorsports	Chevrolet	7
5	4	Kevin Harvick	Stewart-Haas Racing	Ford	6
6	24	William Byron	Hendrick Motorsports	Chevrolet	5
7	22	Joey Logano	Team Penske	Ford	4
8	48	Jimmie Johnson	Hendrick Motorsports	Chevrolet	3
9	19	Martin Truex Jr.	Joe Gibbs Racing	Toyota	2
10	12	Ryan Blaney	Team Penske	Ford	1
Official stage one results

Stage 2 Laps: 100

Pos	No	Driver	Team	Manufacturer	Points
1	2	Brad Keselowski	Team Penske	Ford	10
2	88	Alex Bowman	Hendrick Motorsports	Chevrolet	9
3	18	Kyle Busch	Joe Gibbs Racing	Toyota	8
4	9	Chase Elliott	Hendrick Motorsports	Chevrolet	7
5	24	William Byron	Hendrick Motorsports	Chevrolet	6
6	4	Kevin Harvick	Stewart-Haas Racing	Ford	5
7	12	Ryan Blaney	Team Penske	Ford	4
8	1	Kurt Busch	Chip Ganassi Racing	Chevrolet	3
9	22	Joey Logano	Team Penske	Ford	2
10	42	Kyle Larson	Chip Ganassi Racing	Chevrolet	1
Official stage two results

Stage 3 Laps: 100

Pos	No	Driver	Team	Manufacturer	Points
1	19	Martin Truex Jr.	Joe Gibbs Racing	Toyota	10
2	18	Kyle Busch	Joe Gibbs Racing	Toyota	9
3	9	Chase Elliott	Hendrick Motorsports	Chevrolet	8
4	12	Ryan Blaney	Team Penske	Ford	7
5	1	Kurt Busch	Chip Ganassi Racing	Chevrolet	6
6	88	Alex Bowman	Hendrick Motorsports	Chevrolet	5
7	17	Ricky Stenhouse Jr.	Roush Fenway Racing	Ford	4
8	22	Joey Logano	Team Penske	Ford	3
9	42	Kyle Larson	Chip Ganassi Racing	Chevrolet	2
10	11	Denny Hamlin	Joe Gibbs Racing	Toyota	1
Official stage three results

=== Final stage results ===
Stage 4 Laps: 100

Pos	Grid	No	Driver	Team	Manufacturer	Laps	Points
1	14	19	Martin Truex Jr.	Joe Gibbs Racing	Toyota	400	52
2	7	22	Joey Logano	Team Penske	Ford	400	44
3	3	18	Kyle Busch	Joe Gibbs Racing	Toyota	400	59
4	12	9	Chase Elliott	Hendrick Motorsports	Chevrolet	400	55
5	9	17	Ricky Stenhouse Jr.	Roush Fenway Racing	Ford	400	36
6	22	37	Chris Buescher	JTG Daugherty Racing	Chevrolet	400	31
7	13	88	Alex Bowman	Hendrick Motorsports	Chevrolet	400	44
8	15	48	Jimmie Johnson	Hendrick Motorsports	Chevrolet	400	32
9	1	24	William Byron	Hendrick Motorsports	Chevrolet	400	39
10	5	4	Kevin Harvick	Stewart-Haas Racing	Ford	400	38
11	2	10	Aric Almirola	Stewart-Haas Racing	Ford	400	26
12	30	32	Corey LaJoie	Go Fas Racing	Ford	400	25
13	19	12	Ryan Blaney	Team Penske	Ford	400	36
14	17	21	Paul Menard	Wood Brothers Racing	Ford	400	23
15	31	38	David Ragan	Front Row Motorsports	Ford	400	22
16	18	6	Ryan Newman	Roush Fenway Racing	Ford	400	21
17	20	11	Denny Hamlin	Joe Gibbs Racing	Toyota	400	30
18	6	41	Daniel Suárez	Stewart-Haas Racing	Ford	399	19
19	21	2	Brad Keselowski	Team Penske	Ford	398	38
20	26	36	Matt Tifft (R)	Front Row Motorsports	Ford	398	17
21	10	8	Daniel Hemric (R)	Richard Childress Racing	Chevrolet	398	16
22	23	34	Michael McDowell	Front Row Motorsports	Ford	398	15
23	28	13	Ty Dillon	Germain Racing	Chevrolet	397	14
24	8	14	Clint Bowyer	Stewart-Haas Racing	Ford	397	13
25	29	43	Bubba Wallace	Richard Petty Motorsports	Chevrolet	396	12
26	34	96	Parker Kligerman (i)	Gaunt Brothers Racing	Toyota	396	0
27	11	1	Kurt Busch	Chip Ganassi Racing	Chevrolet	396	19
28	39	77	Quin Houff	Spire Motorsports	Chevrolet	396	9
29	36	53	B. J. McLeod (i)	Rick Ware Racing	Chevrolet	395	0
30	37	27	Reed Sorenson	Premium Motorsports	Chevrolet	389	7
31	24	47	Ryan Preece (R)	JTG Daugherty Racing	Chevrolet	343	6
32	40	66	Joey Gase (i)	MBM Motorsports	Toyota	334	0
33	25	42	Kyle Larson	Chip Ganassi Racing	Chevrolet	315	7
34	4	3	Austin Dillon	Richard Childress Racing	Chevrolet	315	3
35	33	52	Bayley Currey (i)	Rick Ware Racing	Ford	245	0
36	35	15	Ross Chastain (i)	Premium Motorsports	Chevrolet	134	0
37	32	00	Landon Cassill (i)	StarCom Racing	Chevrolet	108	0
38	38	51	Cody Ware (i)	Petty Ware Racing	Ford	51	0
39	27	95	Matt DiBenedetto	Leavine Family Racing	Toyota	49	1
40	16	20	Erik Jones	Joe Gibbs Racing	Toyota	23	1
Official race results

=== Race statistics ===
- Lead changes: 30 among 11 different drivers
- Cautions/Laps: 16 for 80
- Red flags: 1 for 1 minute and 56 seconds
- Time of race: 4 hours, 50 minutes and 9 seconds
- Average speed: 124.074 miles per hour (199.678 km/h)

== Media ==
=== Television ===
Fox Sports televised the race in the United States for the 19th consecutive year. Mike Joy was the lap-by-lap announcer, while three-time Coca-Cola 600 winner, Jeff Gordon and five-time race winner Darrell Waltrip were the color commentators. Jamie Little, Regan Smith, Vince Welch and Matt Yocum reported from pit lane during the race.

Fox Television
Booth announcers	Pit reporters
Lap-by-lap: Mike Joy; Color-commentator: Jeff Gordon; Color commentator: Darrell Waltrip	Jamie Little; Regan Smith; Vince Welch; Matt Yocum

=== Radio ===
Radio coverage of the race was broadcast by the Performance Racing Network (PRN), and was simulcasted on Sirius XM NASCAR Radio. Doug Rice and Mark Garrow called the race in the booth when the field raced through the quad-oval. Rob Albright reported the race from a billboard in turn 2 when the field was racing through turns 1 and 2 and halfway down the backstretch. Pat Patterson called the race from a billboard outside of turn 3 when the field raced through the other half of the backstretch and through turns 3 and 4. Brad Gillie, Brett McMillan, Wendy Venturini and Steve Richards were the pit reporters during the broadcast.

PRN Radio
Booth announcers	Turn announcers	Pit reporters
Lead announcer: Doug Rice; Announcer: Mark Garrow	Turns 1 & 2: Rob Albright; Turns 3 & 4: Pat Patterson	Brad Gillie; Brett McMillan; Wendy Venturini; Steve Richards

== Standings after the race ==
Drivers' Championship standings

	Pos	Driver	Points
1	1	Kyle Busch	528
1	2	Joey Logano	522 (–6)
1	3	Chase Elliott	478 (–50)
1	4	Kevin Harvick	478 (–50)
	5	Brad Keselowski	459 (–69)
1	6	Martin Truex Jr.	448 (–80)
1	7	Denny Hamlin	434 (–94)
	8	Kurt Busch	406 (–122)
1	9	Ryan Blaney	376 (–152)
2	10	Alex Bowman	373 (–155)
2	11	Clint Bowyer	370 (–158)
1	12	Aric Almirola	360 (–168)
	13	Daniel Suárez	334 (–194)
2	14	Jimmie Johnson	324 (–204)
4	15	William Byron	316 (–212)
1	16	Kyle Larson	311 (–217)
Official driver's standings

Manufacturers' Championship standings

Pos	Manufacturer	Points
1	Toyota	484
2	Ford	467 (–17)
3	Chevrolet	435 (–49)

- Note: Only the first 16 positions are included for the driver standings.
- . – Driver has clinched a position in the Monster Energy NASCAR Cup Series playoffs.

Previous race: 2019 Digital Ally 400	Monster Energy NASCAR Cup Series; 2019 season	Next race: 2019 Pocono 400
