= 2019 Pocono 400 =

14th race of the 2019 Monster Energy Cup Series

Race details
- Race 14 of 36 in the 2019 Monster Energy NASCAR Cup Series
- The 2019 Pocono 400 program cover, featuring Martin Truex Jr.
- Date: June 2, 2019
- Location: Pocono Raceway in Long Pond, Pennsylvania
- Course: Permanent racing facility
- Course length: 4 km (2.5 miles)
- Distance: 160 laps, 400 mi (640 km)
- Average speed: 134.718 miles per hour (216.808 km/h)

Pole position
Driver	William Byron	Hendrick Motorsports
- Time: 51.875

Most laps led
Driver	Kyle Busch	Joe Gibbs Racing
- Laps: 79

Winner
No. 18	Kyle Busch	Joe Gibbs Racing

Television in the United States
- Network: FS1
- Announcers: Mike Joy, Jeff Gordon and Darrell Waltrip
- Nielsen ratings: 2.386 million

Radio in the United States
- Radio: MRN
- Booth announcers: Alex Hayden, Jeff Striegle and Rusty Wallace
- Turn announcers: Dave Moody (1), Mike Bagley (2) and Kurt Becker (3)

The 2019 Pocono 400 is a Monster Energy NASCAR Cup Series race held on June 2, 2019 at Pocono Raceway in Long Pond, Pennsylvania. Contested over 160 laps on the 2.5-mile (4.0 km) triangular racecourse, it was the 14th race of the 2019 Monster Energy NASCAR Cup Series season. Kyle Busch won the race, his fourth of the season and 55th career cup series win overall, tying Rusty Wallace for 9th on NASCAR's all-time Cup Series wins list.

== Entry list ==
- (i) denotes driver who are ineligible for series driver points.
- (R) denotes rookie driver.

No.	Driver	Team	Manufacturer
00	Landon Cassill (i)	StarCom Racing	Chevrolet
1	Kurt Busch	Chip Ganassi Racing	Chevrolet
2	Brad Keselowski	Team Penske	Ford
3	Austin Dillon	Richard Childress Racing	Chevrolet
4	Kevin Harvick	Stewart-Haas Racing	Ford
6	Ryan Newman	Roush Fenway Racing	Ford
8	Daniel Hemric (R)	Richard Childress Racing	Chevrolet
9	Chase Elliott	Hendrick Motorsports	Chevrolet
10	Aric Almirola	Stewart-Haas Racing	Ford
11	Denny Hamlin	Joe Gibbs Racing	Toyota
12	Ryan Blaney	Team Penske	Ford
13	Ty Dillon	Germain Racing	Chevrolet
14	Clint Bowyer	Stewart-Haas Racing	Ford
15	Ross Chastain (i)	Premium Motorsports	Chevrolet
17	Ricky Stenhouse Jr.	Roush Fenway Racing	Ford
18	Kyle Busch	Joe Gibbs Racing	Toyota
19	Martin Truex Jr.	Joe Gibbs Racing	Toyota
20	Erik Jones	Joe Gibbs Racing	Toyota
21	Paul Menard	Wood Brothers Racing	Ford
22	Joey Logano	Team Penske	Ford
24	William Byron	Hendrick Motorsports	Chevrolet
27	Reed Sorenson	Premium Motorsports	Chevrolet
32	Corey LaJoie	Go Fas Racing	Ford
34	Michael McDowell	Front Row Motorsports	Ford
36	Matt Tifft (R)	Front Row Motorsports	Ford
37	Chris Buescher	JTG Daugherty Racing	Chevrolet
38	David Ragan	Front Row Motorsports	Ford
41	Daniel Suárez	Stewart-Haas Racing	Ford
42	Kyle Larson	Chip Ganassi Racing	Chevrolet
43	Bubba Wallace	Richard Petty Motorsports	Chevrolet
47	Ryan Preece (R)	JTG Daugherty Racing	Chevrolet
48	Jimmie Johnson	Hendrick Motorsports	Chevrolet
51	Bayley Currey (i)	Petty Ware Racing	Ford
52	J. J. Yeley	Rick Ware Racing	Chevrolet
77	Quin Houff	Spire Motorsports	Chevrolet
88	Alex Bowman	Hendrick Motorsports	Chevrolet
95	Matt DiBenedetto	Leavine Family Racing	Toyota
Official entry list

== Practice ==
=== First practice ===
Daniel Suárez was the fastest in the first practice session with a time of 52.565 seconds and a speed of 171.217 mph (275.547 km/h).

Pos	No.	Driver	Team	Manufacturer	Time	Speed
1	41	Daniel Suárez	Stewart-Haas Racing	Ford	52.565	171.217
2	12	Ryan Blaney	Team Penske	Ford	52.604	171.090
3	88	Alex Bowman	Hendrick Motorsports	Chevrolet	52.836	170.338
Official first practice results

=== Final practice ===
Kurt Busch was the fastest in the final practice session with a time of 52.110 seconds and a speed of 172.712 mph (277.953 km/h).

Pos	No.	Driver	Team	Manufacturer	Time	Speed
1	1	Kurt Busch	Chip Ganassi Racing	Chevrolet	52.110	172.712
2	2	Brad Keselowski	Team Penske	Ford	52.387	171.798
3	42	Kyle Larson	Chip Ganassi Racing	Chevrolet	52.444	171.612
Official final practice results

== Qualifying ==
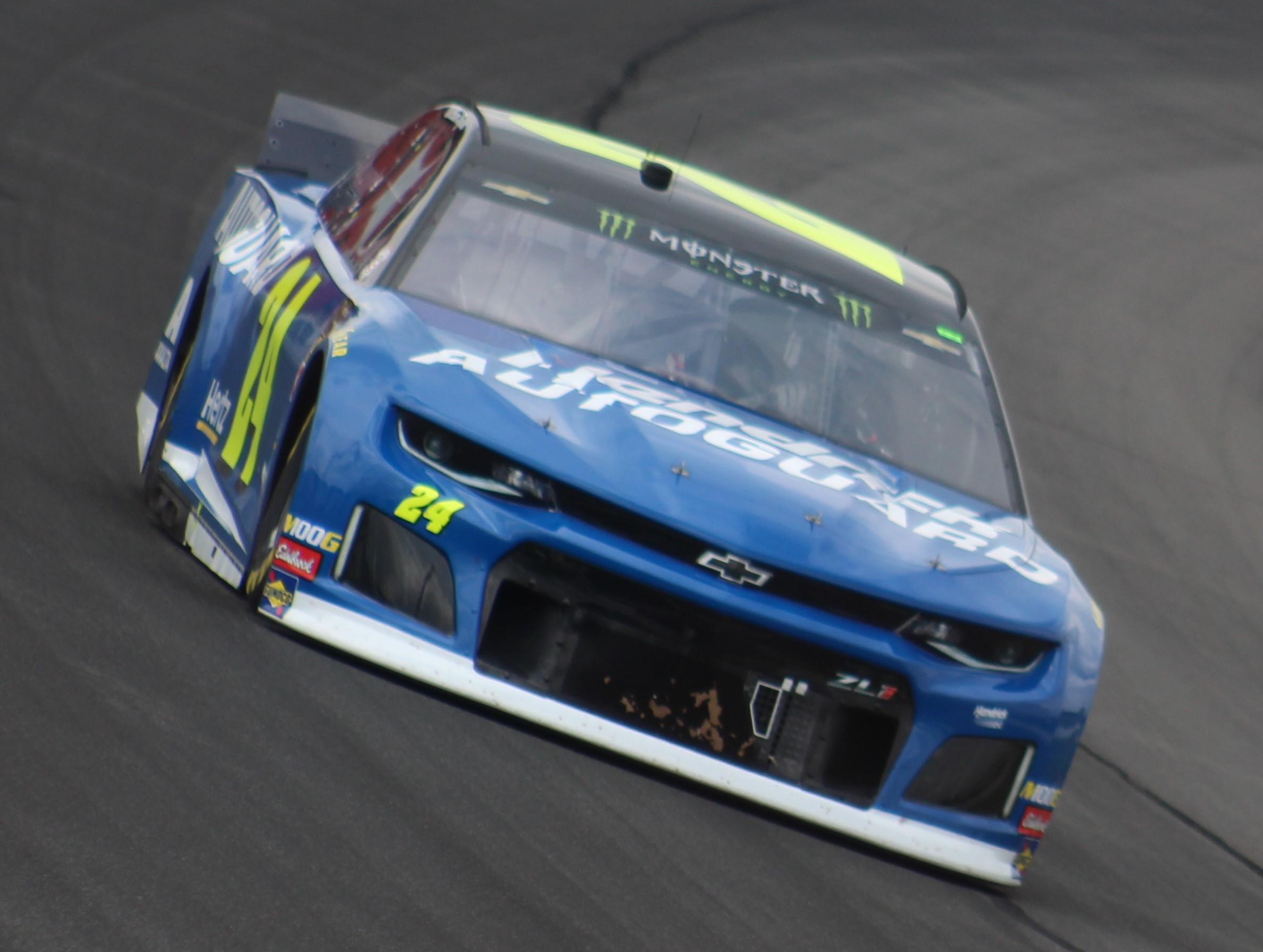
William Byron started from pole position.

William Byron scored the pole for the race with a time of 51.875 and a speed of 173.494 mph (279.212 km/h).

=== Qualifying results ===
Pos	No.	Driver	Team	Manufacturer	Time
1	24	William Byron	Hendrick Motorsports	Chevrolet	51.875
2	18	Kyle Busch	Joe Gibbs Racing	Toyota	52.135
3	14	Clint Bowyer	Stewart-Haas Racing	Ford	52.168
4	20	Erik Jones	Joe Gibbs Racing	Toyota	52.201
5	2	Brad Keselowski	Team Penske	Ford	52.212
6	11	Denny Hamlin	Joe Gibbs Racing	Toyota	52.344
7	42	Kyle Larson	Chip Ganassi Racing	Chevrolet	52.359
8	48	Jimmie Johnson	Hendrick Motorsports	Chevrolet	52.369
9	41	Daniel Suárez	Stewart-Haas Racing	Ford	52.420
10	3	Austin Dillon	Richard Childress Racing	Chevrolet	52.429
11	4	Kevin Harvick	Stewart-Haas Racing	Ford	52.438
12	9	Chase Elliott	Hendrick Motorsports	Chevrolet	52.442
13	10	Aric Almirola	Stewart-Haas Racing	Ford	52.454
14	21	Paul Menard	Wood Brothers Racing	Ford	52.458
15	88	Alex Bowman	Hendrick Motorsports	Chevrolet	52.461
16	22	Joey Logano	Team Penske	Ford	52.518
17	12	Ryan Blaney	Team Penske	Ford	52.574
18	17	Ricky Stenhouse Jr.	Roush Fenway Racing	Ford	52.586
19	6	Ryan Newman	Roush Fenway Racing	Ford	52.761
20	19	Martin Truex Jr.	Joe Gibbs Racing	Toyota	52.803
21	1	Kurt Busch	Chip Ganassi Racing	Chevrolet	52.884
22	95	Matt DiBenedetto	Leavine Family Racing	Toyota	52.910
23	8	Daniel Hemric (R)	Richard Childress Racing	Chevrolet	52.915
24	37	Chris Buescher	JTG Daugherty Racing	Chevrolet	52.928
25	13	Ty Dillon	Germain Racing	Chevrolet	52.942
26	43	Bubba Wallace	Richard Petty Motorsports	Chevrolet	53.189
27	38	David Ragan	Front Row Motorsports	Ford	53.373
28	34	Michael McDowell	Front Row Motorsports	Ford	53.434
29	47	Ryan Preece (R)	JTG Daugherty Racing	Chevrolet	53.711
30	36	Matt Tifft (R)	Front Row Motorsports	Ford	53.862
31	00	Landon Cassill (i)	StarCom Racing	Chevrolet	53.905
32	15	Ross Chastain (i)	Premium Motorsports	Chevrolet	54.063
33	32	Corey LaJoie	Go Fas Racing	Ford	54.073
34	51	Bayley Currey (i)	Petty Ware Racing	Ford	54.086
35	27	Reed Sorenson	Premium Motorsports	Chevrolet	54.982
36	77	Quin Houff	Spire Motorsports	Chevrolet	55.458
37	52	J. J. Yeley	Rick Ware Racing	Chevrolet	0.000
Official qualifying results

== Race ==
=== Stage results ===
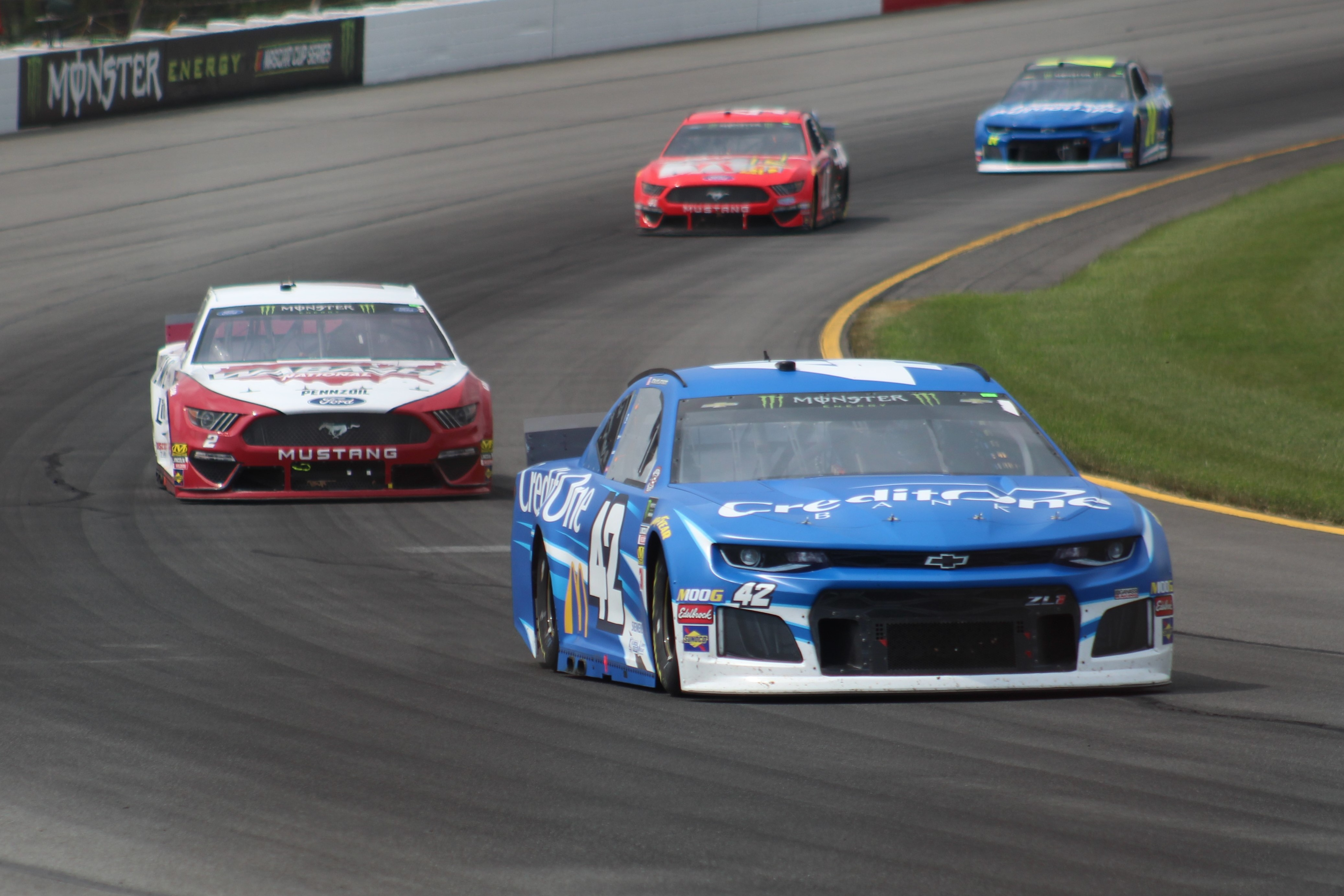
Kyle Larson swept two stages.

Stage One Laps: 50

Pos	No	Driver	Team	Manufacturer	Points
1	42	Kyle Larson	Chip Ganassi Racing	Chevrolet	10
2	24	William Byron	Hendrick Motorsports	Chevrolet	9
3	2	Brad Keselowski	Team Penske	Ford	8
4	4	Kevin Harvick	Stewart-Haas Racing	Ford	7
5	10	Aric Almirola	Stewart-Haas Racing	Ford	6
6	12	Ryan Blaney	Team Penske	Ford	5
7	41	Daniel Suárez	Stewart-Haas Racing	Ford	4
8	22	Joey Logano	Team Penske	Ford	3
9	19	Martin Truex Jr.	Joe Gibbs Racing	Toyota	2
10	21	Paul Menard	Wood Brothers Racing	Ford	1
Official stage one results

Stage Two Laps: 50

Pos	No	Driver	Team	Manufacturer	Points
1	42	Kyle Larson	Chip Ganassi Racing	Chevrolet	10
2	22	Joey Logano	Team Penske	Ford	9
3	24	William Byron	Hendrick Motorsports	Chevrolet	8
4	2	Brad Keselowski	Team Penske	Ford	7
5	6	Ryan Newman	Roush Fenway Racing	Ford	6
6	1	Kurt Busch	Chip Ganassi Racing	Chevrolet	5
7	43	Bubba Wallace	Richard Petty Motorsports	Chevrolet	4
8	37	Chris Buescher	JTG Daugherty Racing	Chevrolet	3
9	8	Daniel Hemric (R)	Richard Childress Racing	Chevrolet	2
10	41	Daniel Suárez	Stewart-Haas Racing	Ford	1
Official stage two results

=== Final stage results ===
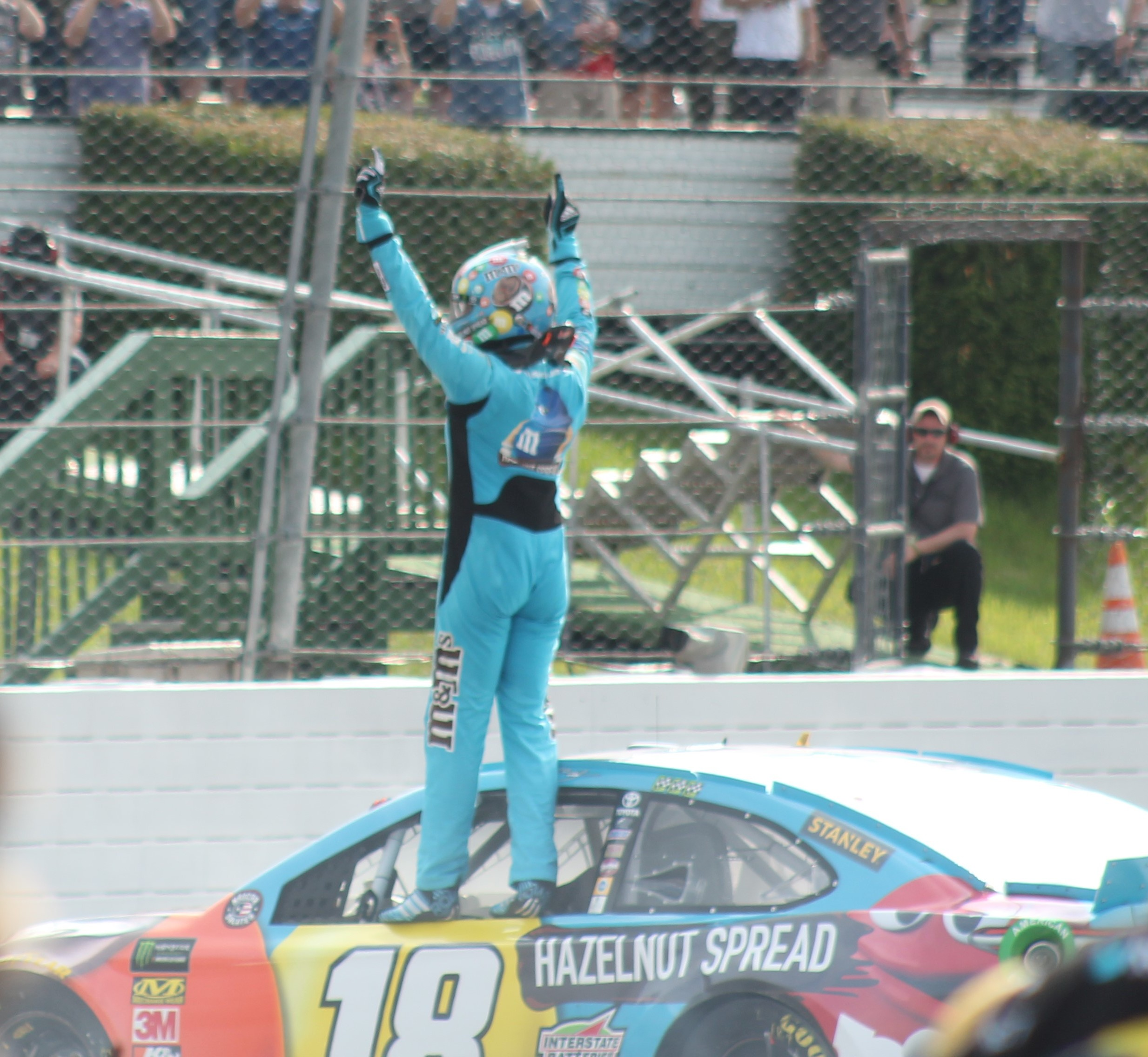
Kyle Busch celebrating victory lap.

Stage Three Laps: 60

Pos	Grid	No	Driver	Team	Manufacturer	Laps	Points
1	2	18	Kyle Busch	Joe Gibbs Racing	Toyota	160	40
2	5	2	Brad Keselowski	Team Penske	Ford	160	50
3	4	20	Erik Jones	Joe Gibbs Racing	Toyota	160	34
4	12	9	Chase Elliott	Hendrick Motorsports	Chevrolet	160	33
5	3	14	Clint Bowyer	Stewart-Haas Racing	Ford	160	32
6	6	11	Denny Hamlin	Joe Gibbs Racing	Toyota	160	31
7	16	22	Joey Logano	Team Penske	Ford	160	42
8	9	41	Daniel Suárez	Stewart-Haas Racing	Ford	160	34
9	1	24	William Byron	Hendrick Motorsports	Chevrolet	160	45
10	13	10	Aric Almirola	Stewart-Haas Racing	Ford	160	33
11	21	1	Kurt Busch	Chip Ganassi Racing	Chevrolet	160	31
12	17	12	Ryan Blaney	Team Penske	Ford	160	30
13	23	8	Daniel Hemric (R)	Richard Childress Racing	Chevrolet	160	26
14	24	37	Chris Buescher	JTG Daugherty Racing	Chevrolet	160	26
15	15	88	Alex Bowman	Hendrick Motorsports	Chevrolet	160	22
16	19	6	Ryan Newman	Roush Fenway Racing	Ford	160	27
17	22	95	Matt DiBenedetto	Leavine Family Racing	Toyota	160	20
18	14	21	Paul Menard	Wood Brothers Racing	Ford	160	20
19	8	48	Jimmie Johnson	Hendrick Motorsports	Chevrolet	160	18
20	28	34	Michael McDowell	Front Row Motorsports	Ford	160	17
21	26	43	Bubba Wallace	Richard Petty Motorsports	Chevrolet	160	20
22	11	4	Kevin Harvick	Stewart-Haas Racing	Ford	159	22
23	29	47	Ryan Preece (R)	JTG Daugherty Racing	Chevrolet	159	14
24	32	15	Ross Chastain (i)	Premium Motorsports	Chevrolet	159	0
25	34	51	Bayley Currey (i)	Petty Ware Racing	Ford	159	0
26	7	42	Kyle Larson	Chip Ganassi Racing	Chevrolet	159	31
27	25	13	Ty Dillon	Germain Racing	Chevrolet	158	10
28	35	27	Reed Sorenson	Premium Motorsports	Chevrolet	157	9
29	36	77	Quin Houff	Spire Motorsports	Chevrolet	157	8
30	27	38	David Ragan	Front Row Motorsports	Ford	156	7
31	31	00	Landon Cassill (i)	StarCom Racing	Chevrolet	154	0
32	18	17	Ricky Stenhouse Jr.	Roush Fenway Racing	Ford	146	5
33	30	36	Matt Tifft (R)	Front Row Motorsports	Ford	128	4
34	37	52	J. J. Yeley	Rick Ware Racing	Chevrolet	110	3
35	20	19	Martin Truex Jr.	Joe Gibbs Racing	Toyota	91	4
36	32	32	Corey LaJoie	Go Fas Racing	Ford	68	1
37	10	3	Austin Dillon	Richard Childress Racing	Chevrolet	28	1
Official race results

=== Race statistics ===
- Lead changes: 13 among 9 different drivers
- Cautions/Laps: 8 for 28
- Red flags: 0
- Time of race: 2 hours, 58 minutes and 9 seconds
- Average speed: 134.718 miles per hour (216.808 km/h)

== Media ==
=== Television ===
Fox NASCAR televised the race in the United States on FS1 for the fifth consecutive year. Mike Joy was the lap-by-lap announcer, while six-time Pocono winner, Jeff Gordon and four-time winner Darrell Waltrip were the color commentators. Jamie Little, Vince Welch and Matt Yocum reported from pit lane during the race.

FS1 Television
Booth announcers	Pit reporters
Lap-by-lap: Mike Joy; Color-commentator: Jeff Gordon; Color commentator: Darrell Waltrip	Jamie Little; Vince Welch; Matt Yocum

=== Radio ===
Radio coverage of the race was broadcast by Motor Racing Network (MRN) and simulcasted on Sirius XM NASCAR Radio. Alex Hayden, Jeff Striegle and four-time Pocono winner Rusty Wallace announced the race in the booth while the field was racing on the front stretch. Dave Moody called the race from atop a billboard outside of turn 1 when the field was racing through turn 1 while Mike Bagley called the race from a billboard outside turn 2 when the field was racing through turn 2. Kurt Becker reported the race from a billboard outside turn 3 when the field was racing through turn 3. Winston Kelley, Steve Post and Dillon Welch reported from pit lane during the race.

MRN
Booth announcers	Turn announcers	Pit reporters
Lead announcer: Alex Hayden; Announcer: Jeff Striegle; Announcer: Rusty Wallace	Turn 1: Dave Moody; Turn 2: Mike Bagley; Turn 3: Kurt Becker	Jason Toy; Steve Post; Dillon Welch

== Standings after the race ==
Drivers' Championship standings

	Pos	Driver	Points
	1	Kyle Busch	568
	2	Joey Logano	564 (–4)
	3	Chase Elliott	511 (–57)
1	4	Brad Keselowski	509 (–59)
1	5	Kevin Harvick	500 (–68)
1	6	Denny Hamlin	465 (–103)
1	7	Martin Truex Jr.	452 (–116)
	8	Kurt Busch	437 (–131)
	9	Ryan Blaney	406 (–162)
1	10	Clint Bowyer	402 (–166)
1	11	Alex Bowman	395 (–173)
	12	Aric Almirola	393 (–175)
	13	Daniel Suárez	368 (–200)
1	14	William Byron	361 (–207)
2	15	Erik Jones	343 (–225)
	16	Kyle Larson	342 (–226)
Official driver's standings

Manufacturers' Championship standings

Pos	Manufacturer	Points
1	Toyota	524
2	Ford	502 (–22)
3	Chevrolet	468 (–56)

- Note: Only the first 16 positions are included for the driver standings.
- . – Driver has clinched a position in the Monster Energy NASCAR Cup Series playoffs.

Previous race: 2019 Coca-Cola 600	Monster Energy NASCAR Cup Series; 2019 season	Next race: 2019 FireKeepers Casino 400
