= 2019 FireKeepers Casino 400 =

15th race of the 2019 Monster Energy Cup Series

Race details
- Race 15 of 36 in the 2019 Monster Energy NASCAR Cup Series
- Date: June 10, 2019
- Location: Michigan International Speedway in Brooklyn, Michigan
- Course: Permanent racing facility
- Course length: 2.0 miles (3.219 km)
- Distance: 203 laps, 406 mi (653.394 km)
- Scheduled distance: 200 laps, 400 mi (643.738 km)
- Average speed: 140.945 miles per hour (226.829 km/h)

Pole position
Driver	Joey Logano	Team Penske
- Time: 38.474

Most laps led
Driver	Joey Logano	Team Penske
- Laps: 163

Winner
No. 22	Joey Logano	Team Penske

Television in the United States
- Network: FS1
- Announcers: Mike Joy, Jeff Gordon and Darrell Waltrip
- Nielsen ratings: 1.801 million

Radio in the United States
- Radio: MRN
- Booth announcers: Alex Hayden, Jeff Striegle and Rusty Wallace
- Turn announcers: Dave Moody (1–2) and Mike Bagley (3–4)

The 2019 FireKeepers Casino 400 was a Monster Energy NASCAR Cup Series race that was scheduled to be held on June 9, 2019 at Michigan International Speedway in Brooklyn, Michigan, but was ultimately held on June 10 due to rain. Contested over 203 laps – extended from 200 laps due to an overtime finish – on the 2-mile (3.2-kilometre) D-shaped oval, it was the 15th race of the 2019 Monster Energy NASCAR Cup Series season.

Defending series champion Joey Logano took his 2nd race win of the season; he started from pole position, and led 163 of the race's 203 laps on his way to victory ahead of Kurt Busch.

== Report ==
=== Background ===
Layout of Michigan International Speedway, the track where the race is held.

The race was held at Michigan International Speedway, a 2-mile (3.2-kilometre) moderate-banked D-shaped speedway located in Brooklyn, Michigan. The track is used primarily for NASCAR events. It is sometimes known as a "sister track" to Texas World Speedway, and was used as the basis of Auto Club Speedway. The track is owned by International Speedway Corporation. Michigan International Speedway is recognized as one of Motorsports premier facilities because of its wide racing surface and high banking (by open-wheel standards; the 18-degree banking is modest by stock car standards).

==== Entry list ====
- (i) denotes driver who are ineligible for series driver points.
- (R) denotes rookie driver.

No.	Driver	Team	Manufacturer
00	Landon Cassill (i)	StarCom Racing	Chevrolet
1	Kurt Busch	Chip Ganassi Racing	Chevrolet
2	Brad Keselowski	Team Penske	Ford
3	Austin Dillon	Richard Childress Racing	Chevrolet
4	Kevin Harvick	Stewart-Haas Racing	Ford
6	Ryan Newman	Roush Fenway Racing	Ford
8	Daniel Hemric (R)	Richard Childress Racing	Chevrolet
9	Chase Elliott	Hendrick Motorsports	Chevrolet
10	Aric Almirola	Stewart-Haas Racing	Ford
11	Denny Hamlin	Joe Gibbs Racing	Toyota
12	Ryan Blaney	Team Penske	Ford
13	Ty Dillon	Germain Racing	Chevrolet
14	Clint Bowyer	Stewart-Haas Racing	Ford
15	Garrett Smithley (i)	Premium Motorsports	Chevrolet
17	Ricky Stenhouse Jr.	Roush Fenway Racing	Ford
18	Kyle Busch	Joe Gibbs Racing	Toyota
19	Martin Truex Jr.	Joe Gibbs Racing	Toyota
20	Erik Jones	Joe Gibbs Racing	Toyota
21	Paul Menard	Wood Brothers Racing	Ford
22	Joey Logano	Team Penske	Ford
24	William Byron	Hendrick Motorsports	Chevrolet
27	Reed Sorenson	Premium Motorsports	Chevrolet
32	Corey LaJoie	Go Fas Racing	Ford
34	Michael McDowell	Front Row Motorsports	Ford
36	Matt Tifft (R)	Front Row Motorsports	Ford
37	Chris Buescher	JTG Daugherty Racing	Chevrolet
38	David Ragan	Front Row Motorsports	Ford
41	Daniel Suárez	Stewart-Haas Racing	Ford
42	Kyle Larson	Chip Ganassi Racing	Chevrolet
43	Bubba Wallace	Richard Petty Motorsports	Chevrolet
47	Ryan Preece (R)	JTG Daugherty Racing	Chevrolet
48	Jimmie Johnson	Hendrick Motorsports	Chevrolet
51	Kyle Weatherman (i)	Petty Ware Racing	Ford
52	Josh Bilicki (i)	Rick Ware Racing	Chevrolet
77	Quin Houff	Spire Motorsports	Chevrolet
88	Alex Bowman	Hendrick Motorsports	Chevrolet
95	Matt DiBenedetto	Leavine Family Racing	Toyota
Official entry list

== Practice ==
=== First practice ===
Daniel Suárez was the fastest in the first practice session with a time of 38.119 seconds and a speed of 188.882 mph (303.976 km/h).

Pos	No.	Driver	Team	Manufacturer	Time	Speed
1	41	Daniel Suárez	Stewart-Haas Racing	Ford	38.119	188.882
2	14	Clint Bowyer	Stewart-Haas Racing	Ford	38.164	188.659
3	3	Austin Dillon	Richard Childress Racing	Chevrolet	38.196	188.501
Official first practice results

=== Final practice ===
Kevin Harvick was the fastest in the final practice session with a time of 38.143 seconds and a speed of 188.763 mph (303.785 km/h).

Pos	No.	Driver	Team	Manufacturer	Time	Speed
1	4	Kevin Harvick	Stewart-Haas Racing	Ford	38.143	188.763
2	18	Kyle Busch	Joe Gibbs Racing	Toyota	38.150	188.729
3	14	Clint Bowyer	Stewart-Haas Racing	Ford	38.201	188.477
Official final practice results

== Qualifying ==
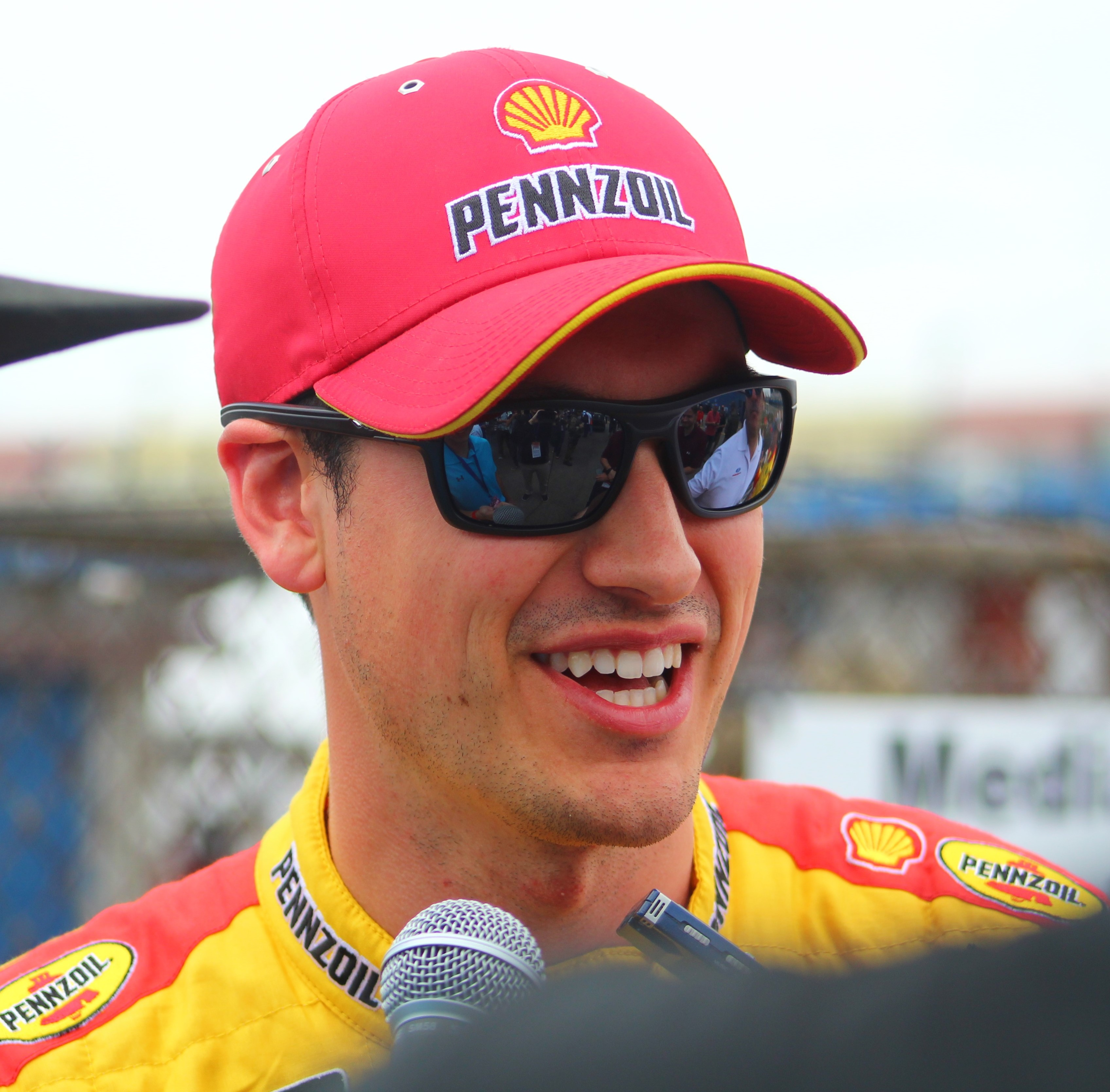
Joey Logano started from pole position.

Joey Logano scored the pole for the race with a time of 38.474 and a speed of 187.139 mph (301.171 km/h).

=== Qualifying results ===
Pos	No.	Driver	Team	Manufacturer	Time
1	22	Joey Logano	Team Penske	Ford	38.474
2	10	Aric Almirola	Stewart-Haas Racing	Ford	38.493
3	4	Kevin Harvick	Stewart-Haas Racing	Ford	38.522
4	11	Denny Hamlin	Joe Gibbs Racing	Toyota	38.526
5	14	Clint Bowyer	Stewart-Haas Racing	Ford	38.549
6	21	Paul Menard	Wood Brothers Racing	Ford	38.573
7	1	Kurt Busch	Chip Ganassi Racing	Chevrolet	38.590
8	2	Brad Keselowski	Team Penske	Ford	38.605
9	41	Daniel Suárez	Stewart-Haas Racing	Ford	38.612
10	17	Ricky Stenhouse Jr.	Roush Fenway Racing	Ford	38.620
11	8	Daniel Hemric (R)	Richard Childress Racing	Chevrolet	38.632
12	3	Austin Dillon	Richard Childress Racing	Chevrolet	38.639
13	12	Ryan Blaney	Team Penske	Ford	38.661
14	20	Erik Jones	Joe Gibbs Racing	Toyota	38.705
15	18	Kyle Busch	Joe Gibbs Racing	Toyota	38.714
16	19	Martin Truex Jr.	Joe Gibbs Racing	Toyota	38.714
17	9	Chase Elliott	Hendrick Motorsports	Chevrolet	38.732
18	6	Ryan Newman	Roush Fenway Racing	Ford	38.792
19	48	Jimmie Johnson	Hendrick Motorsports	Chevrolet	38.793
20	88	Alex Bowman	Hendrick Motorsports	Chevrolet	38.878
21	24	William Byron	Hendrick Motorsports	Chevrolet	38.925
22	42	Kyle Larson	Chip Ganassi Racing	Chevrolet	38.927
23	34	Michael McDowell	Front Row Motorsports	Ford	38.927
24	38	David Ragan	Front Row Motorsports	Ford	38.963
25	13	Ty Dillon	Germain Racing	Chevrolet	39.030
26	36	Matt Tifft (R)	Front Row Motorsports	Ford	39.040
27	43	Bubba Wallace	Richard Petty Motorsports	Chevrolet	39.122
28	47	Ryan Preece (R)	JTG Daugherty Racing	Chevrolet	39.191
29	95	Matt DiBenedetto	Leavine Family Racing	Toyota	39.271
30	00	Landon Cassill (i)	StarCom Racing	Chevrolet	39.274
31	37	Chris Buescher	JTG Daugherty Racing	Chevrolet	39.296
32	32	Corey LaJoie	Go Fas Racing	Ford	39.401
33	51	Kyle Weatherman (i)	Petty Ware Racing	Ford	39.801
34	52	Josh Bilicki (i)	Rick Ware Racing	Chevrolet	40.177
35	77	Quin Houff	Spire Motorsports	Chevrolet	40.271
36	15	Garrett Smithley (i)	Premium Motorsports	Chevrolet	40.435
Official qualifying results

== Race ==
=== Stage results ===
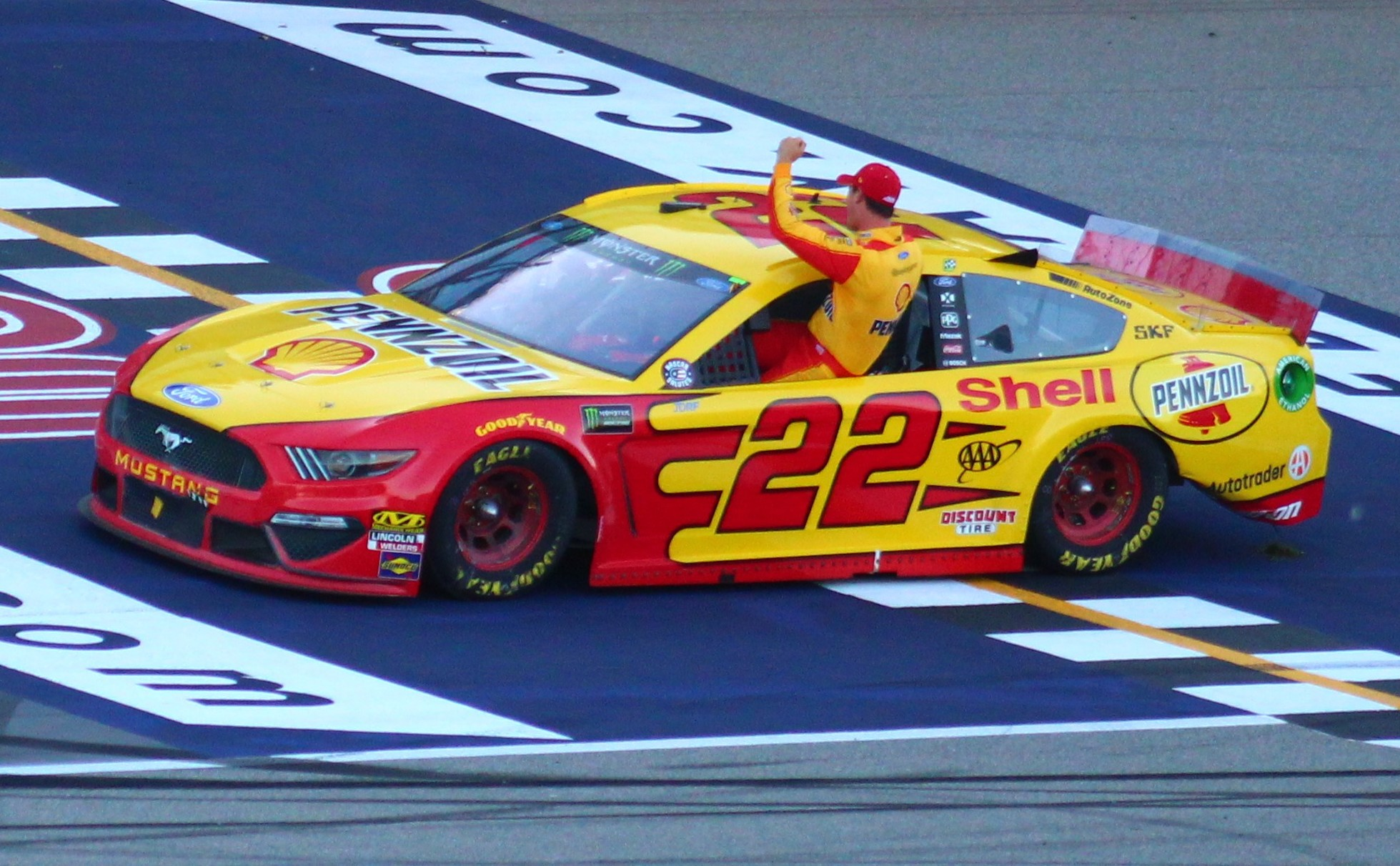
Joey Logano won the first stage.

Stage One Laps: 60

Pos	No	Driver	Team	Manufacturer	Points
1	22	Joey Logano	Team Penske	Ford	10
2	88	Alex Bowman	Hendricks Motorsports	Chevrolet	9
3	20	Erik Jones	Joe Gibbs Racing	Toyota	8
4	10	Aric Almirola	Stewart-Haas Racing	Ford	7
5	1	Kurt Busch	Chip Ganassi Racing	Chevrolet	6
6	19	Martin Truex Jr.	Joe Gibbs Racing	Toyota	5
7	42	Kyle Larson	Chip Ganassi Racing	Chevrolet	4
8	9	Chase Elliott	Hendricks Motorsports	Chevrolet	3
9	21	Paul Menard	Wood Brothers Racing	Ford	2
10	2	Brad Keselowski	Team Penske	Ford	1
Official stage one results

Stage Two

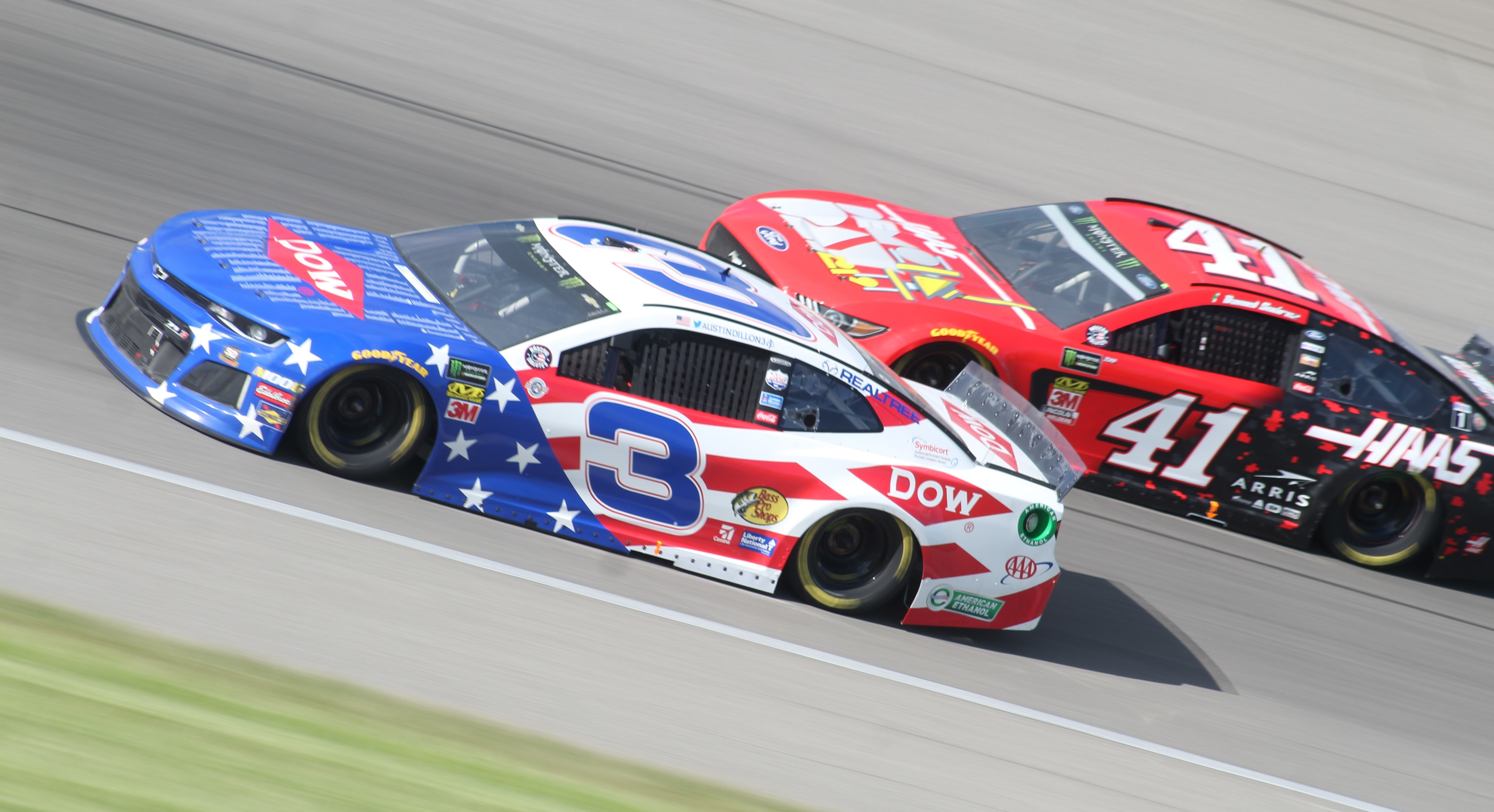
Austin Dillon won the second stage.

Laps: 60

Pos	No	Driver	Team	Manufacturer	Points
1	3	Austin Dillon	Richard Childress Racing	Chevrolet	10
2	4	Kevin Harvick	Stewart-Haas Racing	Ford	9
3	19	Martin Truex Jr.	Joe Gibbs Racing	Toyota	8
4	1	Kurt Busch	Chip Ganassi Racing	Chevrolet	7
5	10	Aric Almirola	Stewart-Haas Racing	Ford	6
6	18	Kyle Busch	Joe Gibbs Racing	Toyota	5
7	8	Daniel Hemric (R)	Richard Childress Racing	Chevrolet	4
8	24	William Byron	Hendrick Motorsports	Chevrolet	3
9	88	Alex Bowman	Hendricks Motorsports	Chevrolet	2
10	37	Chris Buescher	JTG Daugherty Racing	Chevrolet	1
Official stage two results

=== Final stage results ===
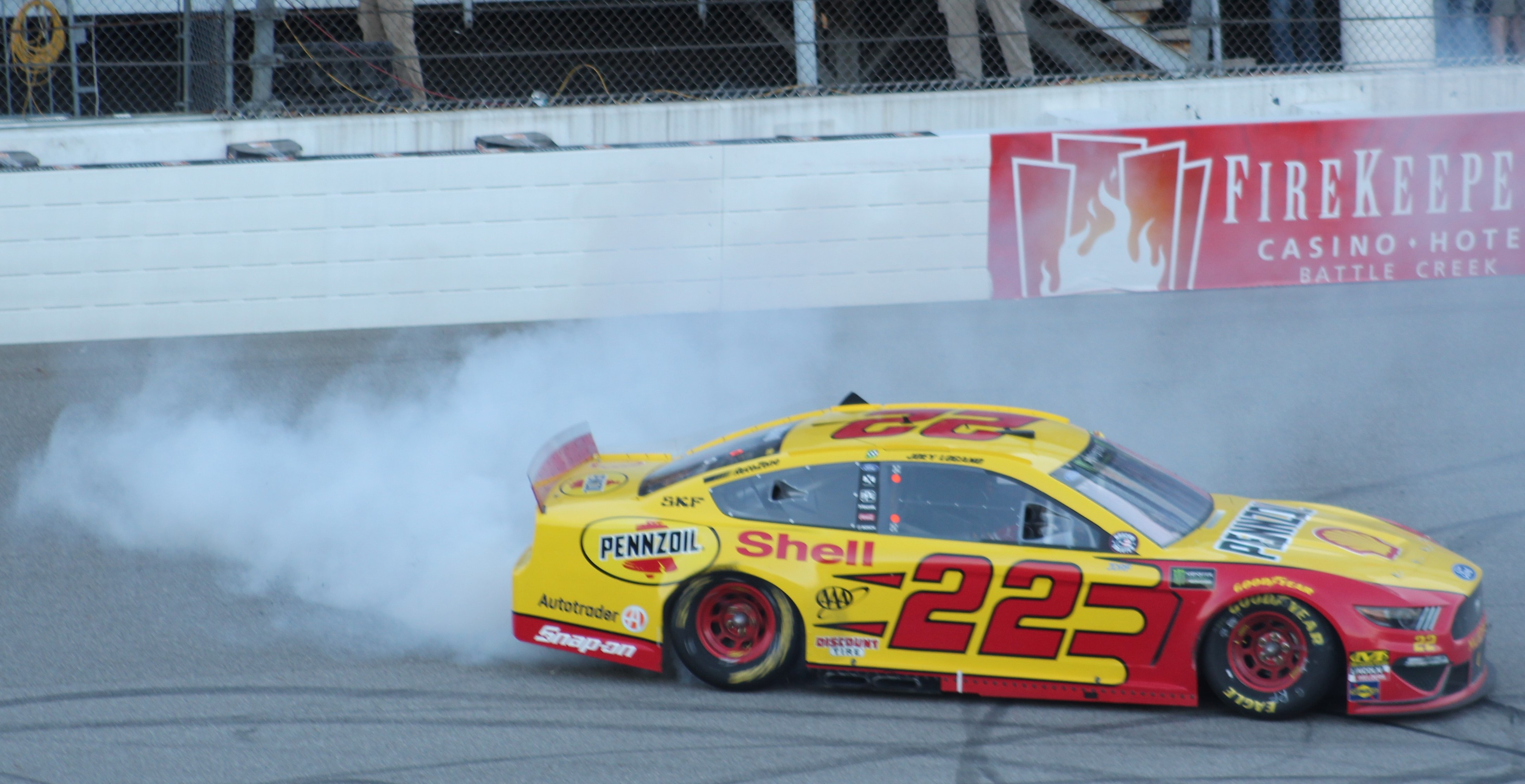
Joey Logano celebrating victory lap.

Stage Three Laps: 80

Pos	Grid	No	Driver	Team	Manufacturer	Laps	Points
1	1	22	Joey Logano	Team Penske	Ford	203	50
2	7	1	Kurt Busch	Chip Ganassi Racing	Chevrolet	203	48
3	16	19	Martin Truex Jr.	Joe Gibbs Racing	Toyota	203	47
4	9	41	Daniel Suárez	Stewart-Haas Racing	Ford	203	33
5	15	18	Kyle Busch	Joe Gibbs Racing	Toyota	203	37
6	8	2	Brad Keselowski	Team Penske	Ford	203	32
7	3	4	Kevin Harvick	Stewart-Haas Racing	Ford	203	39
8	18	6	Ryan Newman	Roush Fenway Racing	Ford	203	29
9	13	12	Ryan Blaney	Team Penske	Ford	203	28
10	20	88	Alex Bowman	Hendrick Motorsports	Chevrolet	203	38
11	4	11	Denny Hamlin	Joe Gibbs Racing	Toyota	203	26
12	11	8	Daniel Hemric (R)	Richard Childress Racing	Chevrolet	203	29
13	6	21	Paul Menard	Wood Brothers Racing	Ford	203	26
14	22	42	Kyle Larson	Chip Ganassi Racing	Chevrolet	203	27
15	19	48	Jimmie Johnson	Hendrick Motorsports	Chevrolet	203	22
16	31	37	Chris Buescher	JTG Daugherty Racing	Chevrolet	203	22
17	2	10	Aric Almirola	Stewart-Haas Racing	Ford	203	33
18	21	24	William Byron	Hendrick Motorsports	Chevrolet	203	22
19	10	17	Ricky Stenhouse Jr.	Roush Fenway Racing	Ford	203	18
20	17	9	Chase Elliott	Hendrick Motorsports	Chevrolet	203	20
21	29	95	Matt DiBenedetto	Leavine Family Racing	Toyota	203	16
22	25	13	Ty Dillon	Germain Racing	Chevrolet	203	15
23	32	32	Corey LaJoie	Go Fas Racing	Ford	203	14
24	26	36	Matt Tifft (R)	Front Row Motorsports	Ford	203	13
25	28	47	Ryan Preece (R)	JTG Daugherty Racing	Chevrolet	203	12
26	12	3	Austin Dillon	Richard Childress Racing	Chevrolet	202	21
27	23	34	Michael McDowell	Front Row Motorsports	Ford	202	10
28	27	43	Bubba Wallace	Richard Petty Motorsports	Chevrolet	201	9
29	30	00	Landon Cassill (i)	StarCom Racing	Chevrolet	201	0
30	36	15	Garrett Smithley (i)	Premium Motorsports	Chevrolet	200	0
31	14	20	Erik Jones	Joe Gibbs Racing	Toyota	199	14
32	35	77	Quin Houff	Spire Motorsports	Chevrolet	198	5
33	34	52	Josh Bilicki (i)	Rick Ware Racing	Chevrolet	197	0
34	24	38	David Ragan	Front Row Motorsports	Ford	195	3
35	5	14	Clint Bowyer	Stewart-Haas Racing	Ford	130	2
36	33	51	Kyle Weatherman (i)	Petty Ware Racing	Ford	69	0
Official race results

=== Race statistics ===
- Lead changes: 20 among 11 different drivers
- Cautions/Laps: 7 for 35 laps
- Red flags: 0
- Time of race: 2 hours, 52 minutes and 50 seconds
- Average speed: 140.945 miles per hour (226.829 km/h)

== Media ==
=== Television ===
Fox NASCAR televised the race in the United States on FS1 for the fourth time at Michigan. Mike Joy was the lap-by-lap announcer, while three-time Michigan winner, Jeff Gordon and two-time winner Darrell Waltrip were the color commentators. Jamie Little, Regan Smith and Matt Yocum reported from pit lane during the race.

FS1 Television
Booth announcers	Pit reporters
Lap-by-lap: Mike Joy; Color-commentator: Jeff Gordon; Color commentator: Darrell Waltrip	Jamie Little; Regan Smith; Matt Yocum

=== Radio ===
Radio coverage of the race was broadcast by Motor Racing Network (MRN) and simulcasted on SiriusXM's NASCAR Radio channel. Alex Hayden, Jeff Striegle and five-time Michigan winner Rusty Wallace announced the race in the booth while the field was racing on the front stretch. Dave Moody called the race from a billboard outside of turn 2 when the field was racing through turns 1 and 2. Mike Bagley called the race from a platform outside of turn 3 when the field was racing through turns 3 and 4. Kim Coon, Steve Post, Pete Pistone and Dillon Welch reported from pit lane during the race.

MRN
Booth announcers	Turn announcers	Pit reporters
Lead announcer: Alex Hayden; Announcer: Jeff Striegle; Announcer: Rusty Wallace	Turns 1 & 2: Dave Moody; Turns 3 & 4: Mike Bagley	Kim Coon; Steve Post; Dillon Welch; Pete Pistone

== Standings after the race ==
Drivers' Championship standings

	Pos	Driver	Points
1	1	Joey Logano	614
1	2	Kyle Busch	605 (–9)
1	3	Brad Keselowski	541 (–73)
1	4	Kevin Harvick	539 (–75)
2	5	Chase Elliott	531 (–83)
1	6	Martin Truex Jr.	499 (–115)
1	7	Denny Hamlin	491 (–123)
	8	Kurt Busch	485 (–129)
	9	Ryan Blaney	434 (–180)
1	10	Alex Bowman	433 (–181)
1	11	Aric Almirola	426 (–188)
2	12	Clint Bowyer	404 (–210)
	13	Daniel Suárez	401 (–213)
	14	William Byron	383 (–231)
1	15	Kyle Larson	369 (–245)
1	16	Jimmie Johnson	364 (–250)
Official driver's standings

Manufacturers' Championship standings

Pos	Manufacturer	Points
1	Toyota	558
2	Ford	542 (–16)
3	Chevrolet	503 (–55)

- Note: Only the first 16 positions are included for the driver standings.
- . – Driver has clinched a position in the Monster Energy NASCAR Cup Series playoffs.

Previous race: 2019 Pocono 400	Monster Energy NASCAR Cup Series; 2019 season	Next race: 2019 Toyota/Save Mart 350
