= 2019 Gander RV 400 (Dover) =

11th race of the 2019 Monster Energy Cup Series

Race details
- Race 11 of 36 in the 2019 Monster Energy NASCAR Cup Series
- Date: May 6, 2019
- Location: Dover International Speedway in Dover, Delaware
- Course: Permanent racing facility
- Course length: 1 miles (1.6 km)
- Distance: 400 laps, 400 mi (640 km)
- Average speed: 127.242 miles per hour (204.776 km/h)

Pole position
Driver	Chase Elliott	Hendrick Motorsports
- Time: 21.692

Most laps led
Driver	Chase Elliott	Hendrick Motorsports
- Laps: 145

Winner
No. 19	Martin Truex Jr.	Joe Gibbs Racing

Television in the United States
- Network: FS1
- Announcers: Mike Joy, Jeff Gordon and Darrell Waltrip
- Nielsen ratings: 1.541 million

Radio in the United States
- Radio: MRN
- Booth announcers: Alex Hayden, Jeff Striegle and Rusty Wallace
- Turn announcers: Mike Bagley (Backstretch)

The 2019 Gander RV 400 was a Monster Energy NASCAR Cup Series race held on May 6, 2019, at Dover International Speedway in Dover, Delaware. Contested over 400 laps on the 1-mile (1.6 km) concrete speedway, it was the 11th race of the 2019 Monster Energy NASCAR Cup Series season. The race was postponed from Sunday, May 5 to Monday, May 6 due to rain.

== Report ==
=== Background ===
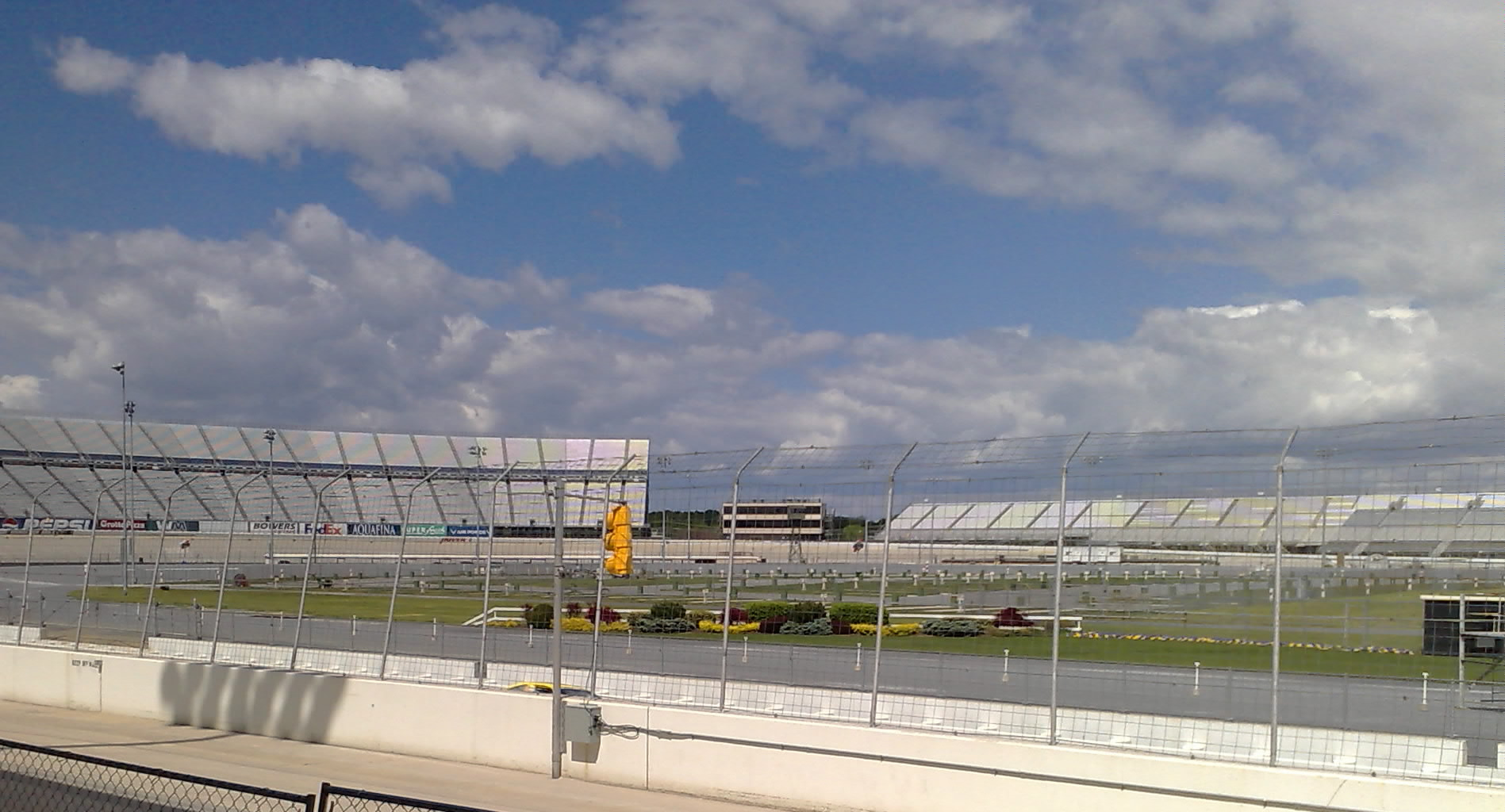
Dover International Speedway, the track where the race was held.

Dover International Speedway is an oval race track in Dover, Delaware, United States that has held at least two NASCAR races since it opened in 1969. In addition to NASCAR, the track also hosted USAC and the NTT IndyCar Series. The track features one layout, a 1 mile (1.6 km) concrete oval, with 24° banking in the turns and 9° banking on the straights. The speedway is owned and operated by Dover Motorsports.

The track, nicknamed "The Monster Mile", was built in 1969 by Melvin Joseph of Melvin L. Joseph Construction Company, Inc., with an asphalt surface, but was replaced with concrete in 1995. Six years later in 2001, the track's capacity moved to 135,000 seats, making the track have the largest capacity of sports venue in the mid-Atlantic. In 2002, the name changed to Dover International Speedway from Dover Downs International Speedway after Dover Downs Gaming and Entertainment split, making Dover Motorsports. From 2007 to 2009, the speedway worked on an improvement project called "The Monster Makeover", which expanded facilities at the track and beautified the track. After the 2014 season, the track's capacity was reduced to 95,500 seats.

==== Entry list ====
No.	Driver	Team	Manufacturer
00	Landon Cassill (i)	StarCom Racing	Chevrolet
1	Kurt Busch	Chip Ganassi Racing	Chevrolet
2	Brad Keselowski	Team Penske	Ford
3	Austin Dillon	Richard Childress Racing	Chevrolet
4	Kevin Harvick	Stewart-Haas Racing	Ford
6	Ryan Newman	Roush Fenway Racing	Ford
8	Daniel Hemric (R)	Richard Childress Racing	Chevrolet
9	Chase Elliott	Hendrick Motorsports	Chevrolet
10	Aric Almirola	Stewart-Haas Racing	Ford
11	Denny Hamlin	Joe Gibbs Racing	Toyota
12	Ryan Blaney	Team Penske	Ford
13	Ty Dillon	Germain Racing	Chevrolet
14	Clint Bowyer	Stewart-Haas Racing	Ford
15	Ross Chastain (i)	Premium Motorsports	Chevrolet
17	Ricky Stenhouse Jr.	Roush Fenway Racing	Ford
18	Kyle Busch	Joe Gibbs Racing	Toyota
19	Martin Truex Jr.	Joe Gibbs Racing	Toyota
20	Erik Jones	Joe Gibbs Racing	Toyota
21	Paul Menard	Wood Brothers Racing	Ford
22	Joey Logano	Team Penske	Ford
24	William Byron	Hendrick Motorsports	Chevrolet
27	Reed Sorenson	Premium Motorsports	Chevrolet
32	Corey LaJoie	Go Fas Racing	Ford
34	Michael McDowell	Front Row Motorsports	Ford
36	Matt Tifft (R)	Front Row Motorsports	Ford
37	Chris Buescher	JTG Daugherty Racing	Chevrolet
38	David Ragan	Front Row Motorsports	Ford
41	Daniel Suárez	Stewart-Haas Racing	Ford
42	Kyle Larson	Chip Ganassi Racing	Chevrolet
43	Bubba Wallace	Richard Petty Motorsports	Chevrolet
47	Ryan Preece (R)	JTG Daugherty Racing	Chevrolet
48	Jimmie Johnson	Hendrick Motorsports	Chevrolet
51	Cody Ware (i)	Petty Ware Racing	Ford
52	B. J. McLeod (i)	Rick Ware Racing	Chevrolet
77	Quin Houff	Spire Motorsports	Chevrolet
88	Alex Bowman	Hendrick Motorsports	Chevrolet
95	Matt DiBenedetto	Leavine Family Racing	Toyota
Official entry list

== First practice ==
Kurt Busch was the fastest in the first practice session with a time of 21.372 seconds and a speed of 168.445 mph (271.086 km/h).

Pos	No.	Driver	Team	Manufacturer	Time	Speed
1	1	Kurt Busch	Chip Ganassi Racing	Chevrolet	21.372	168.445
2	42	Kyle Larson	Chip Ganassi Racing	Chevrolet	21.415	168.106
3	4	Kevin Harvick	Stewart-Haas Racing	Ford	21.435	167.950
Official first practice results

== Qualifying ==
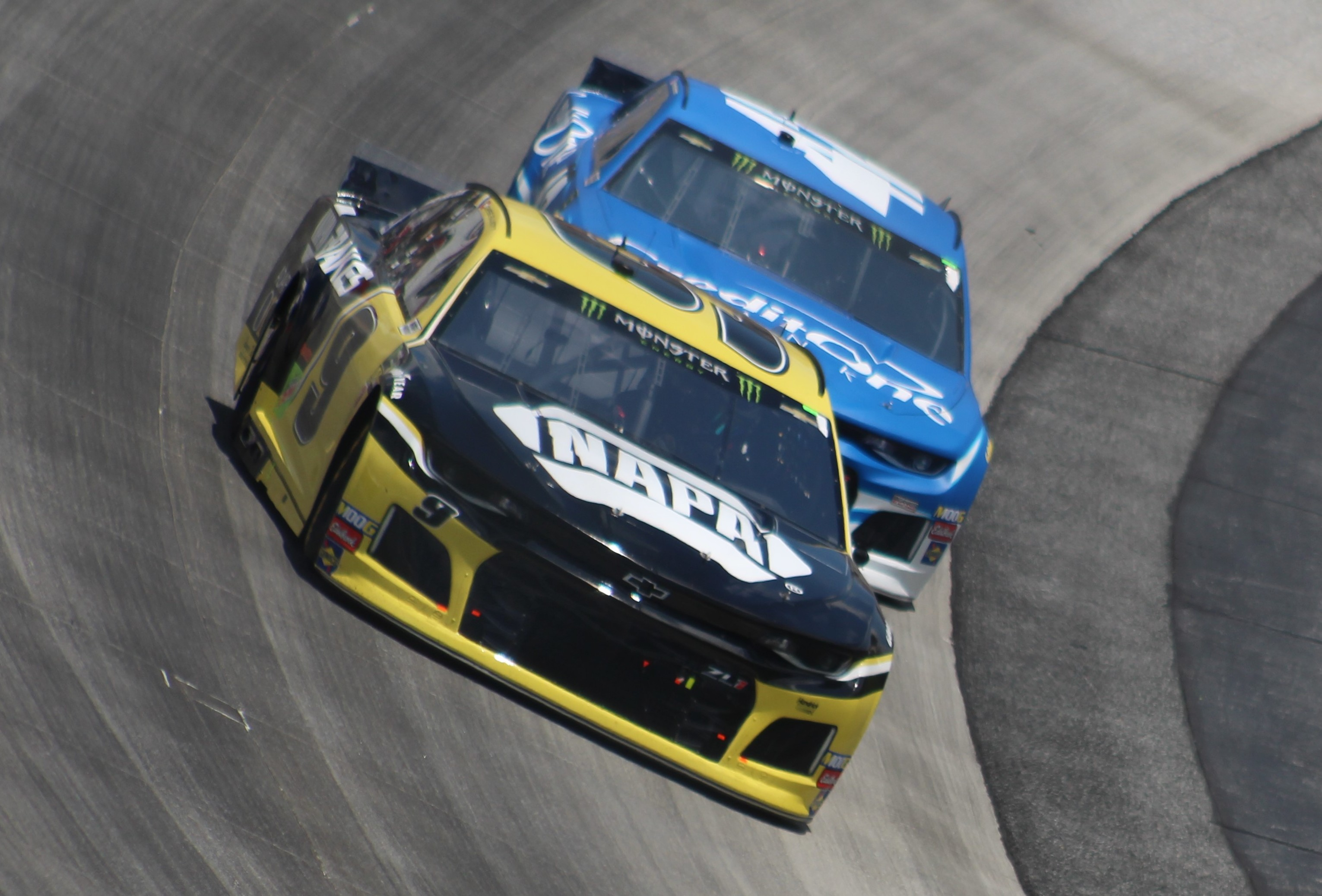
Chase Elliott started from pole position.

Chase Elliott scored the pole for the race with a time of 21.692 and a speed of 165.960 mph (267.087 km/h).

=== Qualifying results ===
Pos	No.	Driver	Team	Manufacturer	Time
1	9	Chase Elliott	Hendrick Motorsports	Chevrolet	21.692
2	24	William Byron	Hendrick Motorsports	Chevrolet	21.745
3	42	Kyle Larson	Chip Ganassi Racing	Chevrolet	21.757
4	22	Joey Logano	Team Penske	Ford	21.855
5	88	Alex Bowman	Hendrick Motorsports	Chevrolet	21.857
6	4	Kevin Harvick	Stewart-Haas Racing	Ford	21.907
7	10	Aric Almirola	Stewart-Haas Racing	Ford	21.918
8	11	Denny Hamlin	Joe Gibbs Racing	Toyota	21.931
9	2	Brad Keselowski	Team Penske	Ford	21.936
10	14	Clint Bowyer	Stewart-Haas Racing	Ford	21.949
11	12	Ryan Blaney	Team Penske	Ford	22.008
12	48	Jimmie Johnson	Hendrick Motorsports	Chevrolet	22.039
13	19	Martin Truex Jr.	Joe Gibbs Racing	Toyota	22.055
14	41	Daniel Suárez	Stewart-Haas Racing	Ford	22.073
15	20	Erik Jones	Joe Gibbs Racing	Toyota	22.086
16	3	Austin Dillon	Richard Childress Racing	Chevrolet	22.090
17	95	Matt DiBenedetto	Leavine Family Racing	Toyota	22.108
18	21	Paul Menard	Wood Brothers Racing	Ford	22.136
19	1	Kurt Busch	Chip Ganassi Racing	Chevrolet	22.140
20	17	Ricky Stenhouse Jr.	Roush Fenway Racing	Ford	22.152
21	6	Ryan Newman	Roush Fenway Racing	Ford	22.176
22	18	Kyle Busch	Joe Gibbs Racing	Toyota	22.233
23	8	Daniel Hemric (R)	Richard Childress Racing	Chevrolet	22.267
24	38	David Ragan	Front Row Motorsports	Ford	22.317
25	13	Ty Dillon	Germain Racing	Chevrolet	22.325
26	34	Michael McDowell	Front Row Motorsports	Ford	22.326
27	43	Bubba Wallace	Richard Petty Motorsports	Chevrolet	22.419
28	32	Corey LaJoie	Go Fas Racing	Ford	22.572
29	47	Ryan Preece (R)	JTG Daugherty Racing	Chevrolet	22.698
30	37	Chris Buescher	JTG Daugherty Racing	Chevrolet	22.829
31	00	Landon Cassill (i)	StarCom Racing	Chevrolet	22.948
32	36	Matt Tifft (R)	Front Row Motorsports	Ford	23.132
33	51	Cody Ware (i)	Petty Ware Racing	Ford	23.369
34	52	B. J. McLeod (i)	Rick Ware Racing	Chevrolet	23.384
35	77	Quin Houff	Spire Motorsports	Chevrolet	23.465
36	15	Ross Chastain (i)	Premium Motorsports	Chevrolet	0.000
37	27	Reed Sorenson	Premium Motorsports	Chevrolet	0.000
Official qualifying results

- Four cars were sent to the back at the start of the race (Nos. 19, 36, 47, 88). The 36 of Matt Tifft was also forced to complete a pass through penalty on the start because of failing inspection after qualifying 3 times.

== Practice (post-qualifying) ==
=== Second practice ===
Second practice session scheduled for Saturday was cancelled due to fog.

=== Final practice ===
Jimmie Johnson was the fastest in the final practice session with a time of 22.241 seconds and a speed of 161.863 mph (260.493 km/h).

Pos	No.	Driver	Team	Manufacturer	Time	Speed
1	48	Jimmie Johnson	Hendrick Motorsports	Chevrolet	22.241	161.863
2	19	Martin Truex Jr.	Joe Gibbs Racing	Toyota	22.261	161.718
3	20	Erik Jones	Joe Gibbs Racing	Toyota	22.300	161.435
Official final practice results

== Race ==
=== Stage results ===
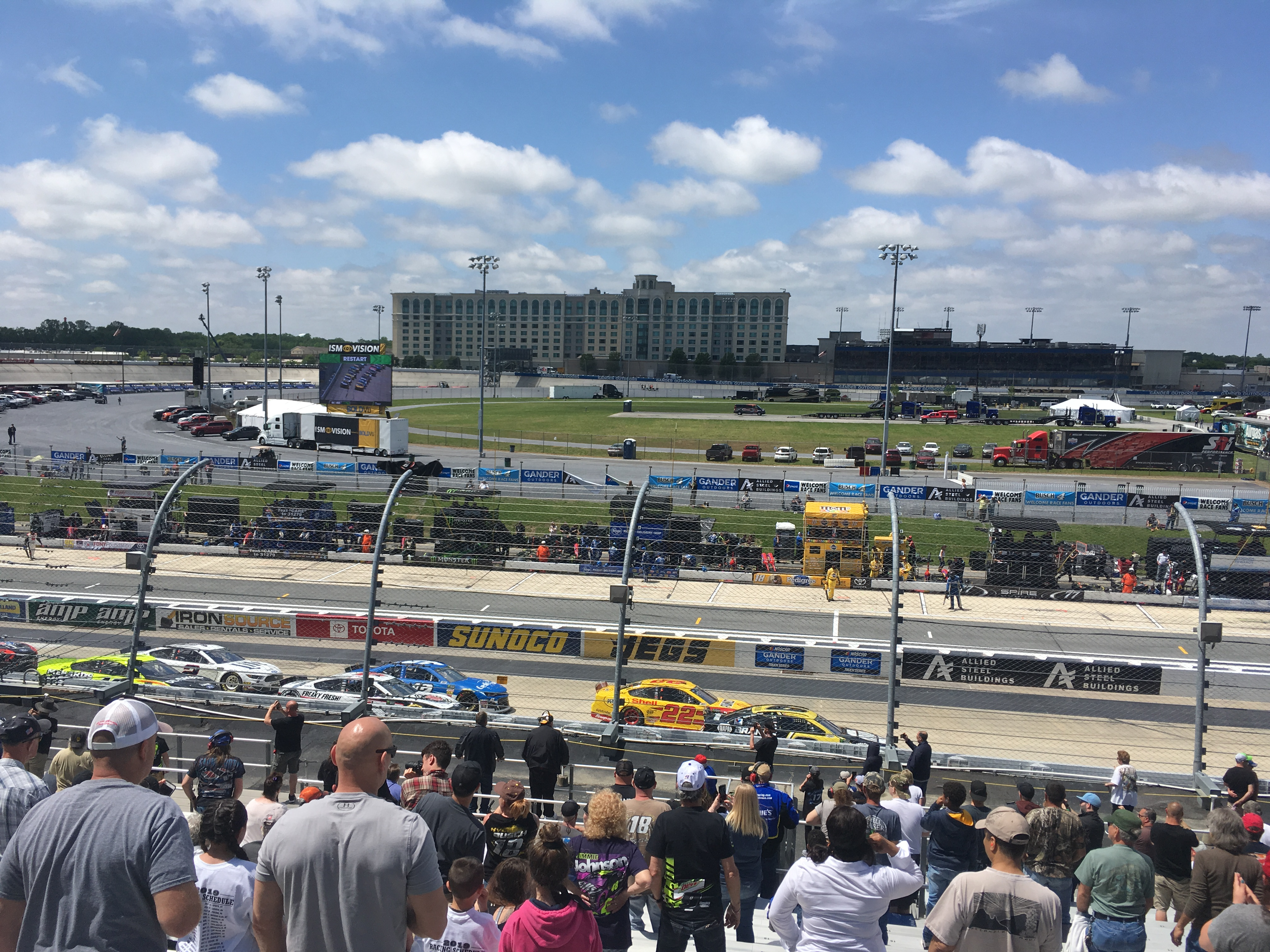
Chase Elliott leads the race following a restart

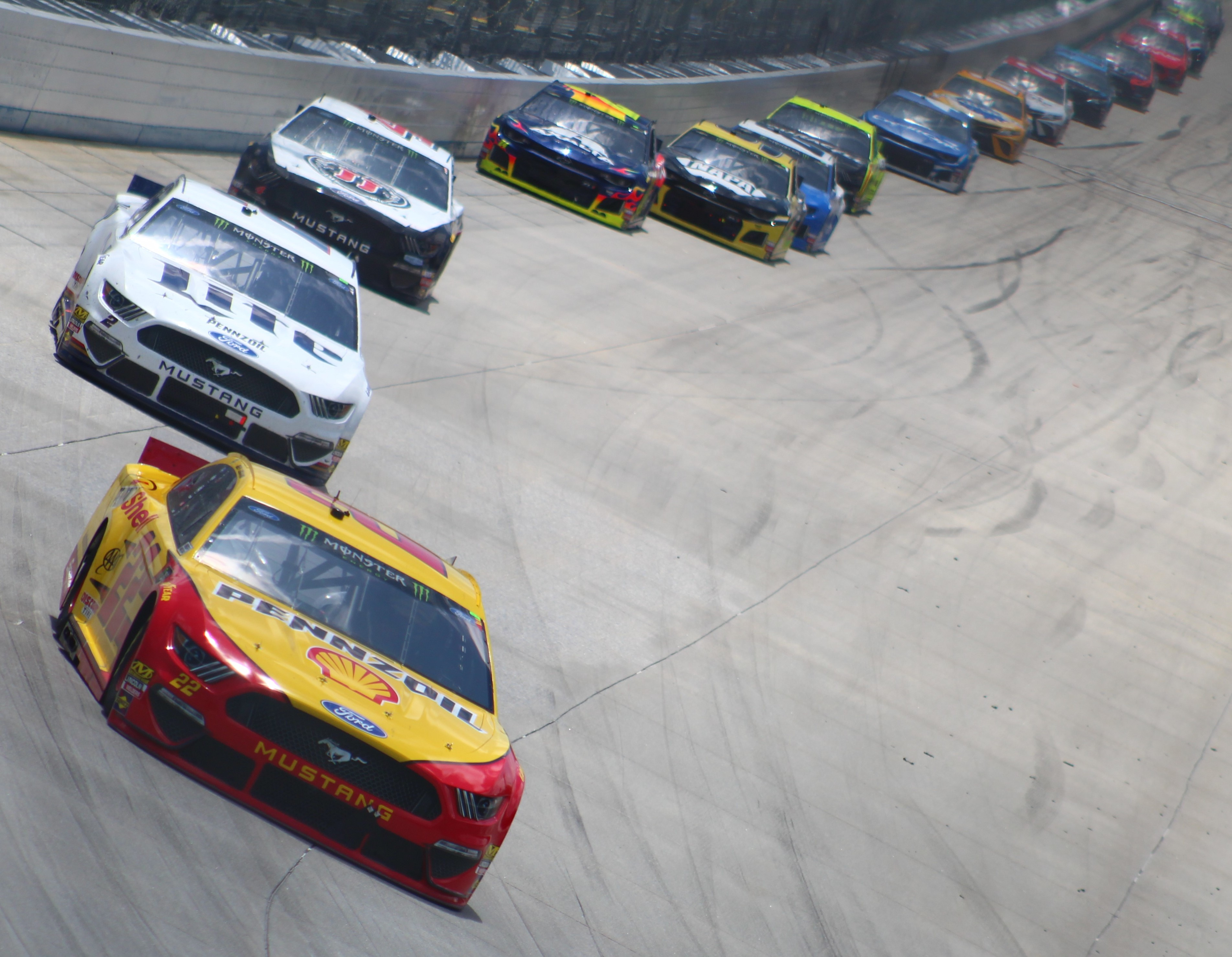
Joey Logano won the first stage.

Stage One Laps: 120

Pos	No	Driver	Team	Manufacturer	Points
1	22	Joey Logano	Team Penske	Ford	10
2	2	Brad Keselowski	Team Penske	Ford	9
3	9	Chase Elliott	Hendrick Motorsports	Chevrolet	8
4	42	Kyle Larson	Chip Ganassi Racing	Chevrolet	7
5	4	Kevin Harvick	Stewart-Haas Racing	Ford	6
6	24	William Byron	Hendrick Motorsports	Chevrolet	5
7	88	Alex Bowman	Hendrick Motorsports	Chevrolet	4
8	12	Ryan Blaney	Team Penske	Ford	3
9	20	Erik Jones	Joe Gibbs Racing	Toyota	2
10	14	Clint Bowyer	Stewart-Haas Racing	Ford	1
Official stage one results

Stage Two Laps: 120

Pos	No	Driver	Team	Manufacturer	Points
1	19	Martin Truex Jr.	Joe Gibbs Racing	Toyota	10
2	88	Alex Bowman	Hendrick Motorsports	Chevrolet	9
3	4	Kevin Harvick	Stewart-Haas Racing	Ford	8
4	9	Chase Elliott	Hendrick Motorsports	Chevrolet	7
5	2	Brad Keselowski	Team Penske	Ford	6
6	42	Kyle Larson	Chip Ganassi Racing	Chevrolet	5
7	12	Ryan Blaney	Team Penske	Ford	4
8	18	Kyle Busch	Joe Gibbs Racing	Toyota	3
9	14	Clint Bowyer	Stewart-Haas Racing	Ford	2
10	20	Erik Jones	Joe Gibbs Racing	Toyota	1
Official stage two results

=== Final stage results ===
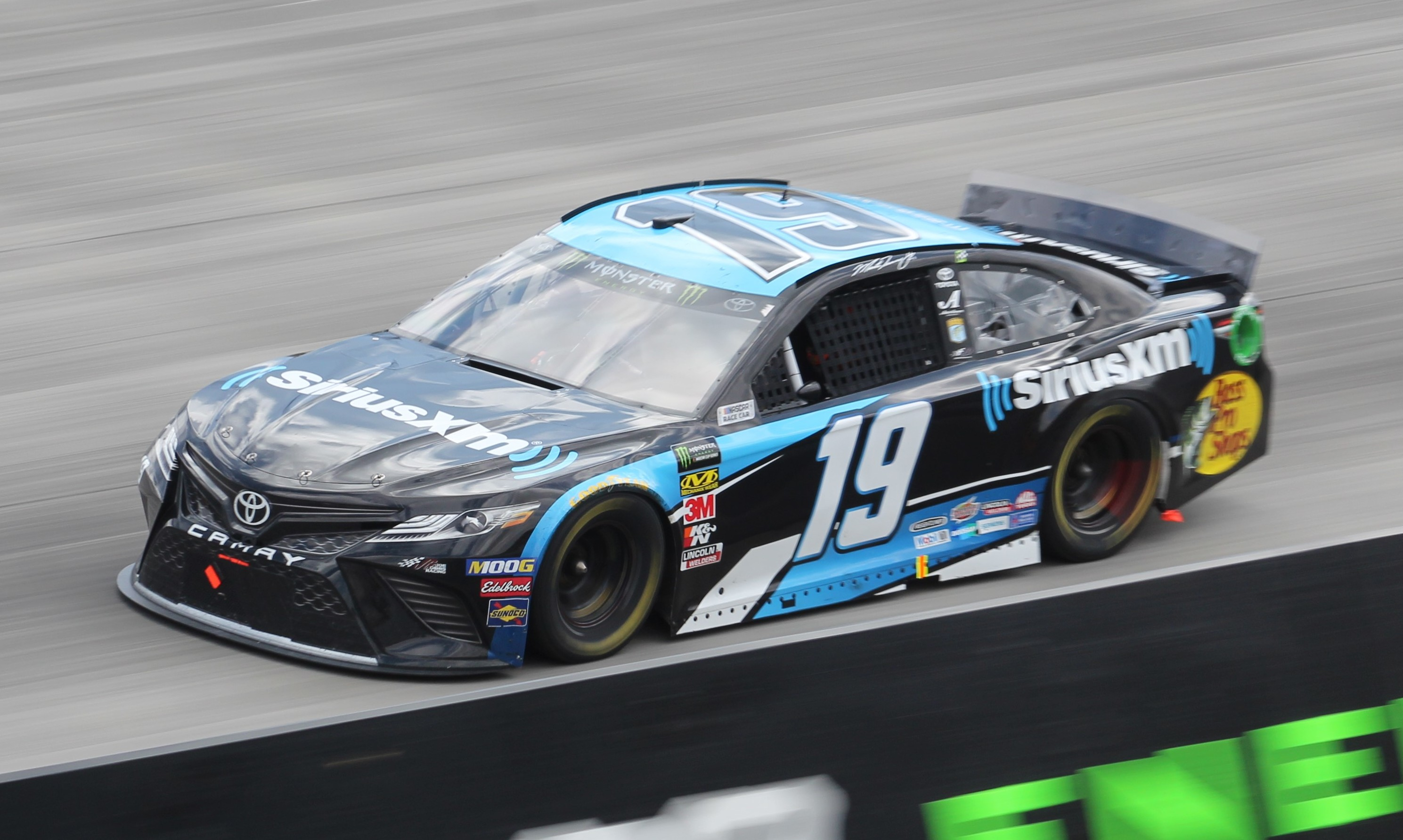
Martin Truex Jr. won the race

Stage Three Laps: 160

Pos	Grid	No	Driver	Team	Manufacturer	Laps	Points
1	13	19	Martin Truex Jr.	Joe Gibbs Racing	Toyota	400	50
2	5	88	Alex Bowman	Hendrick Motorsports	Chevrolet	400	48
3	3	42	Kyle Larson	Chip Ganassi Racing	Chevrolet	400	46
4	6	4	Kevin Harvick	Stewart Haas Racing	Ford	400	47
5	1	9	Chase Elliott	Hendrick Motorsports	Chevrolet	400	47
6	15	20	Erik Jones	Joe Gibbs Racing	Toyota	400	34
7	4	22	Joey Logano	Team Penske	Ford	400	40
8	2	24	William Byron	Hendrick Motorsports	Chevrolet	400	34
9	10	14	Clint Bowyer	Stewart-Haas Racing	Ford	400	31
10	22	18	Kyle Busch	Joe Gibbs Racing	Toyota	400	30
11	14	41	Daniel Suárez	Stewart-Haas Racing	Ford	400	26
12	9	2	Brad Keselowski	Team Penske	Ford	399	40
13	19	1	Kurt Busch	Chip Ganassi Racing	Chevrolet	399	24
14	12	48	Jimmie Johnson	Hendrick Motorsports	Chevrolet	399	23
15	11	12	Ryan Blaney	Team Penske	Ford	399	29
16	7	10	Aric Almirola	Stewart-Haas Racing	Ford	399	21
17	18	21	Paul Menard	Wood Brothers Racing	Ford	398	20
18	21	6	Ryan Newman	Roush Fenway Racing	Ford	398	19
19	16	3	Austin Dillon	Richard Childress Racing	Chevrolet	398	18
20	17	95	Matt DiBenedetto	Leavine Family Racing	Toyota	398	17
21	8	11	Denny Hamlin	Joe Gibbs Racing	Toyota	397	16
22	25	13	Ty Dillon	Germain Racing	Chevrolet	397	15
23	30	37	Chris Buescher	JTG Daugherty Racing	Chevrolet	397	14
24	26	34	Michael McDowell	Front Row Motorsports	Ford	395	13
25	23	8	Daniel Hemric (R)	Richard Childress Racing	Chevrolet	394	12
26	24	38	David Ragan	Front Row Motorsports	Ford	393	11
27	27	43	Bubba Wallace	Richard Petty Motorsports	Ford	393	10
28	29	47	Ryan Preece (R)	JTG Daugherty Racing	Chevrolet	392	9
29	28	32	Corey LaJoie	Go Fas Racing	Ford	392	8
30	36	15	Ross Chastain (i)	Premium Motorsports	Chevrolet	389	0
31	31	00	Landon Cassill (i)	StarCom Racing	Chevrolet	389	0
32	32	36	Matt Tifft (R)	Front Row Motorsports	Ford	387	5
33	20	17	Ricky Stenhouse Jr.	Roush Fenway Racing	Ford	386	4
34	33	51	Cody Ware (i)	Petty Ware Racing	Ford	383	0
35	37	27	Reed Sorenson	Premium Motorsports	Chevrolet	356	2
36	35	77	Quin Houff	Spire Motorsports	Chevrolet	168	1
37	34	52	B. J. McLeod (i)	Rick Ware Racing	Chevrolet	96	0
Official race results

=== Race statistics ===
- Lead changes: 15 among 11 different drivers
- Cautions/Laps: 6 for 31
- Red flags: 0
- Time of race: 3 hours, 8 minutes and 37 seconds
- Average speed: 127.242 miles per hour (204.776 km/h)

== Media ==
=== Television ===
Fox Sports covered their 19th race at the Dover International Speedway. Mike Joy, five-time Dover winner Jeff Gordon and two-time Dover winner Darrell Waltrip had the call in the booth for the race. Jamie Little, Vince Welch and Matt Yocum handled the action on pit road for the television side.

FS1
Booth announcers	Pit reporters
Lap-by-lap: Mike Joy; Color-commentator: Jeff Gordon; Color commentator: Darrell Waltrip	Jamie Little; Vince Welch; Matt Yocum

=== Radio ===
MRN had the radio call for the race which was also simulcasted on Sirius XM NASCAR Radio.

MRN Radio
Booth announcers	Turn announcers	Pit reporters
Lead announcer: Alex Hayden; Announcer: Jeff Striegle; Announcer: Rusty Wallace	Backstretch: Mike Bagley	Jason Toy; Steve Post; Dillon Welch; Kim Coon

== Standings after the race ==
Drivers' Championship standings

	Pos	Driver	Points
	1	Kyle Busch	460
	2	Joey Logano	455 (–5)
1	3	Kevin Harvick	397 (–63)
1	4	Denny Hamlin	383 (–77)
1	5	Martin Truex Jr.	378 (–82)
1	6	Brad Keselowski	377 (–83)
	7	Chase Elliott	371 (–89)
	8	Kurt Busch	347 (–113)
	9	Ryan Blaney	335 (–125)
	10	Clint Bowyer	319 (–141)
	11	Aric Almirola	309 (–151)
	12	Daniel Suárez	292 (–168)
2	13	Alex Bowman	287 (–173)
1	14	Ryan Newman	270 (–190)
6	15	Kyle Larson	267 (–193)
2	16	Erik Jones	264 (–196)
Official driver's standings

Manufacturers' Championship standings

Pos	Manufacturer	Points
1	Toyota	410
2	Ford	392 (–18)
3	Chevrolet	367 (–43)

- Note: Only the first 16 positions are included for the driver standings.
- . – Driver has clinched a position in the Monster Energy NASCAR Cup Series playoffs.

Previous race: 2019 GEICO 500	Monster Energy NASCAR Cup Series; 2019 season	Next race: 2019 Digital Ally 400
