= 2019 Digital Ally 400 =

12th race of the 2019 Monster Energy Cup Series

Race details
- Race 12 of 36 in the 2019 Monster Energy NASCAR Cup Series
- Date: May 11, 2019
- Location: Kansas Speedway in Kansas City, Kansas
- Course: Permanent racing facility
- Course length: 1.5 miles (2.414 km)
- Distance: 271 laps, 406.5 mi (654.198 km)
- Scheduled distance: 267 laps, 400.5 mi (644.542 km)
- Average speed: 131.023 miles per hour (210.861 km/h)

Pole position
Driver	Kevin Harvick	Stewart-Haas Racing
- Time: 30.131

Most laps led
Driver	Kevin Harvick	Stewart-Haas Racing
- Laps: 104

Winner
No. 2	Brad Keselowski	Team Penske

Television in the United States
- Network: FS1
- Announcers: Mike Joy, Jeff Gordon and Darrell Waltrip
- Nielsen ratings: 2.177 million

Radio in the United States
- Radio: MRN
- Booth announcers: Alex Hayden, Jeff Striegle and Rusty Wallace
- Turn announcers: Dave Moody (1 & 2) and Mike Bagley (3 & 4)

The 2019 Digital Ally 400 was a Monster Energy NASCAR Cup Series race held on May 11, 2019, at Kansas Speedway in Kansas City, Kansas. Contested over 271 laps – extended from 267 laps due to an overtime finish – on the 1.5-mile (2.4-kilometre) asphalt speedway, it was the 12th race of the 2019 Monster Energy NASCAR Cup Series season. Brad Keselowski won the race, his 3rd of the season and 30th career victory overall.

== Report ==
=== Background ===
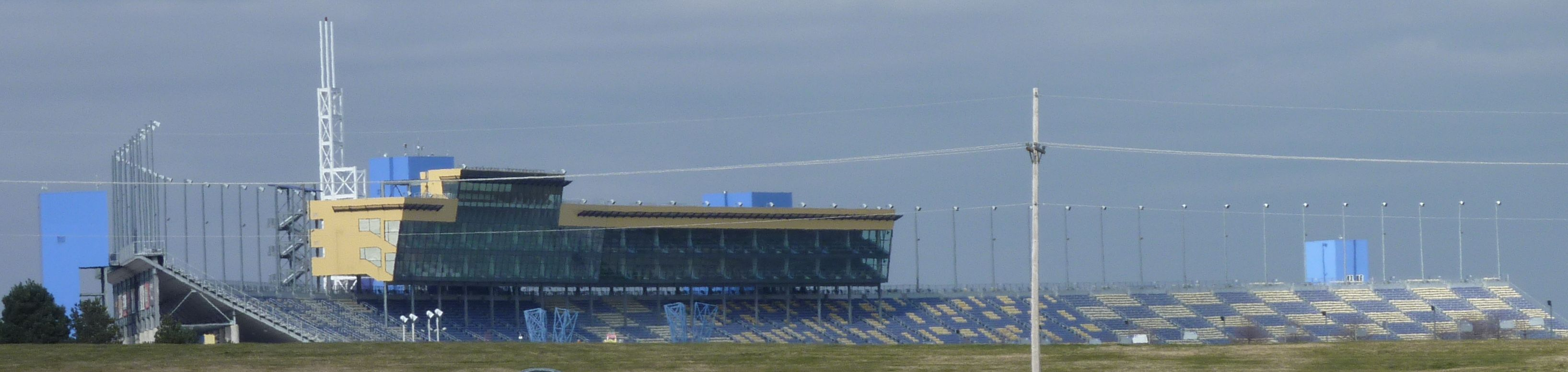
Kansas Speedway, the track where the race was held.

Kansas Speedway is a 1.5-mile (2.4-kilometre) tri-oval race track in Kansas City, Kansas. It was built in 2001 and hosts a pair of NASCAR race weekends annually, while the IndyCar Series also raced there from 2001 to 2010. The speedway is owned and operated by the International Speedway Corporation.

==== Entry list ====
No.	Driver	Team	Manufacturer
00	Landon Cassill (i)	StarCom Racing	Chevrolet
1	Kurt Busch	Chip Ganassi Racing	Chevrolet
2	Brad Keselowski	Team Penske	Ford
3	Austin Dillon	Richard Childress Racing	Chevrolet
4	Kevin Harvick	Stewart-Haas Racing	Ford
6	Ryan Newman	Roush Fenway Racing	Ford
8	Daniel Hemric (R)	Richard Childress Racing	Chevrolet
9	Chase Elliott	Hendrick Motorsports	Chevrolet
10	Aric Almirola	Stewart-Haas Racing	Ford
11	Denny Hamlin	Joe Gibbs Racing	Toyota
12	Ryan Blaney	Team Penske	Ford
13	Ty Dillon	Germain Racing	Chevrolet
14	Clint Bowyer	Stewart-Haas Racing	Ford
15	Ross Chastain (i)	Premium Motorsports	Chevrolet
17	Ricky Stenhouse Jr.	Roush Fenway Racing	Ford
18	Kyle Busch	Joe Gibbs Racing	Toyota
19	Martin Truex Jr.	Joe Gibbs Racing	Toyota
20	Erik Jones	Joe Gibbs Racing	Toyota
21	Paul Menard	Wood Brothers Racing	Ford
22	Joey Logano	Team Penske	Ford
24	William Byron	Hendrick Motorsports	Chevrolet
27	Reed Sorenson	Premium Motorsports	Chevrolet
31	Tyler Reddick (i)	Richard Childress Racing	Chevrolet
32	Corey LaJoie	Go Fas Racing	Ford
34	Michael McDowell	Front Row Motorsports	Ford
36	Matt Tifft (R)	Front Row Motorsports	Ford
37	Chris Buescher	JTG Daugherty Racing	Chevrolet
38	David Ragan	Front Row Motorsports	Ford
41	Daniel Suárez	Stewart-Haas Racing	Ford
42	Kyle Larson	Chip Ganassi Racing	Chevrolet
43	Bubba Wallace	Richard Petty Motorsports	Chevrolet
46	Joey Gase (i)	MBM Motorsports	Toyota
47	Ryan Preece (R)	JTG Daugherty Racing	Chevrolet
48	Jimmie Johnson	Hendrick Motorsports	Chevrolet
51	Cody Ware (i)	Petty Ware Racing	Chevrolet
52	Bayley Currey (i)	Rick Ware Racing	Ford
66	Timmy Hill (i)	MBM Motorsports	Toyota
77	Quin Houff	Spire Motorsports	Chevrolet
88	Alex Bowman	Hendrick Motorsports	Chevrolet
95	Matt DiBenedetto	Leavine Family Racing	Toyota
Official entry list

== Practice ==
=== First practice ===
Aric Almirola was the fastest in the first practice session with a time of 30.311 seconds and a speed of 178.153 mph (286.709 km/h).

Pos	No.	Driver	Team	Manufacturer	Time	Speed
1	10	Aric Almirola	Stewart-Haas Racing	Ford	30.311	178.153
2	14	Clint Bowyer	Stewart-Haas Racing	Ford	30.443	177.381
3	18	Kyle Busch	Joe Gibbs Racing	Toyota	30.481	177.160
Official first practice results

=== Final practice ===
Kurt Busch was the fastest in the final practice session with a time of 30.383 seconds and a speed of 177.731 mph (286.030 km/h).

Pos	No.	Driver	Team	Manufacturer	Time	Speed
1	1	Kurt Busch	Chip Ganassi Racing	Chevrolet	30.383	177.731
2	88	Alex Bowman	Hendrick Motorsports	Chevrolet	30.452	177.328
3	14	Clint Bowyer	Stewart-Haas Racing	Ford	30.459	177.288
Official final practice results

== Qualifying ==
Kevin Harvick scored the pole for the race with a time of 30.131 and a speed of 179.217 mph (288.422 km/h).

=== Qualifying results ===
Pos	No.	Driver	Team	Manufacturer	Time
1	4	Kevin Harvick	Stewart-Haas Racing	Ford	30.131
2	10	Aric Almirola (Note: Car would later fail technical inspection, and started from the rear of the field as a result.)	Stewart-Haas Racing	Ford	30.214
3	14	Clint Bowyer	Stewart-Haas Racing	Ford	30.282
4	41	Daniel Suárez	Stewart-Haas Racing	Ford	30.295
5	9	Chase Elliott	Hendrick Motorsports	Chevrolet	30.345
6	19	Martin Truex Jr.	Joe Gibbs Racing	Toyota	30.447
7	24	William Byron	Hendrick Motorsports	Chevrolet	30.483
8	42	Kyle Larson	Chip Ganassi Racing	Chevrolet	30.530
9	2	Brad Keselowski	Team Penske	Ford	30.540
10	88	Alex Bowman	Hendrick Motorsports	Chevrolet	30.542
11	20	Erik Jones	Joe Gibbs Racing	Toyota	30.577
12	43	Bubba Wallace	Richard Petty Motorsports	Chevrolet	30.579
13	18	Kyle Busch	Joe Gibbs Racing	Toyota	30.586
14	1	Kurt Busch	Chip Ganassi Racing	Chevrolet	30.586
15	13	Ty Dillon	Germain Racing	Chevrolet	30.605
16	21	Paul Menard	Wood Brothers Racing	Ford	30.644
17	11	Denny Hamlin	Joe Gibbs Racing	Toyota	30.651
18	48	Jimmie Johnson	Hendrick Motorsports	Chevrolet	30.673
19	12	Ryan Blaney	Team Penske	Ford	30.676
20	22	Joey Logano	Team Penske	Ford	30.729
21	17	Ricky Stenhouse Jr.	Roush Fenway Racing	Ford	30.732
22	3	Austin Dillon	Richard Childress Racing	Chevrolet	30.751
23	34	Michael McDowell	Front Row Motorsports	Ford	30.818
24	32	Corey LaJoie	Go Fas Racing	Ford	30.820
25	00	Landon Cassill (i)	StarCom Racing	Chevrolet	30.823
26	8	Daniel Hemric (R)	Richard Childress Racing	Chevrolet	30.825
27	37	Chris Buescher	JTG Daugherty Racing	Chevrolet	30.889
28	6	Ryan Newman	Roush Fenway Racing	Ford	30.893
29	95	Matt DiBenedetto	Leavine Family Racing	Toyota	30.917
30	31	Tyler Reddick (i)	Richard Childress Racing	Chevrolet	30.932
31	47	Ryan Preece (R)	JTG Daugherty Racing	Chevrolet	30.938
32	52	Bayley Currey (i)	Rick Ware Racing	Ford	30.956
33	38	David Ragan	Front Row Motorsports	Ford	30.992
34	77	Quin Houff	Spire Motorsports	Chevrolet	31.123
35	36	Matt Tifft (R)	Front Row Motorsports	Ford	31.192
36	15	Ross Chastain (i)	Premium Motorsports	Chevrolet	31.242
37	51	Cody Ware (i)	Petty Ware Racing	Chevrolet	31.590
38	46	Joey Gase (i)	MBM Motorsports	Toyota	32.027
39	66	Timmy Hill (i)	MBM Motorsports	Toyota	34.485
40	27	Reed Sorenson	Premium Motorsports	Chevrolet	0.000
Official qualifying results

== Race ==
=== Stage results ===
Stage One Laps: 80

Pos	No	Driver	Team	Manufacturer	Points
1	4	Kevin Harvick	Stewart Haas Racing	Ford	10
2	9	Chase Elliott	Hendrick Motorsports	Chevrolet	9
3	17	Ricky Stenhouse Jr.	Roush Fenway Racing	Ford	8
4	42	Kyle Larson	Chip Ganassi Racing	Chevrolet	7
5	1	Kurt Busch	Chip Ganassi Racing	Chevrolet	6
6	37	Chris Buescher	JTG Daugherty Racing	Chevrolet	5
7	2	Brad Keselowski	Team Penske	Ford	4
8	14	Clint Bowyer	Stewart-Haas Racing	Ford	3
9	20	Erik Jones	Joe Gibbs Racing	Toyota	2
10	22	Joey Logano	Team Penske	Ford	1
Official stage one results

Stage Two Laps: 80

Pos	No	Driver	Team	Manufacturer	Points
1	9	Chase Elliott	Hendrick Motorsports	Chevrolet	10
2	4	Kevin Harvick	Stewart Haas Racing	Ford	9
3	20	Erik Jones	Joe Gibbs Racing	Toyota	8
4	88	Alex Bowman	Hendrick Motorsports	Chevrolet	7
5	17	Ricky Stenhouse Jr.	Roush Fenway Racing	Ford	6
6	37	Chris Buescher	JTG Daugherty Racing	Chevrolet	5
7	1	Kurt Busch	Chip Ganassi Racing	Chevrolet	4
8	14	Clint Bowyer	Stewart-Haas Racing	Ford	3
9	18	Kyle Busch	Joe Gibbs Racing	Toyota	2
10	42	Kyle Larson	Chip Ganassi Racing	Chevrolet	1
Official stage two results

=== Final stage results ===
Stage Three Laps: 107

Pos	Grid	No	Driver	Team	Manufacturer	Laps	Points
1	4	2	Brad Keselowski	Team Penske	Ford	271	44
2	5	88	Alex Bowman	Hendrick Motorsports	Chevrolet	271	42
3	6	20	Erik Jones	Joe Gibbs Racing	Toyota	271	44
4	32	9	Chase Elliott	Hendrick Motorsports	Chevrolet	271	52
5	2	14	Clint Bowyer	Stewart-Haas Racing	Ford	271	38
6	12	48	Jimmie Johnson	Hendrick Motorsports	Chevrolet	271	31
7	9	1	Kurt Busch	Chip Ganassi Racing	Chevrolet	271	40
8	35	42	Kyle Larson	Chip Ganassi Racing	Chevrolet	271	37
9	21	31	Tyler Reddick (i)	Richard Childress Racing	Chevrolet	271	0
10	18	37	Chris Buescher	JTG Daugherty Racing	Chevrolet	271	37
11	14	17	Ricky Stenhouse Jr.	Roush Fenway Racing	Ford	271	40
12	33	10	Aric Almirola	Stewart-Haas Racing	Ford	271	25
13	1	4	Kevin Harvick	Stewart-Haas Racing	Ford	271	43
14	34	41	Daniel Suárez	Stewart-Haas Racing	Ford	271	23
15	30	22	Joey Logano	Team Penske	Ford	270	23
16	11	11	Denny Hamlin	Joe Gibbs Racing	Toyota	270	21
17	15	3	Austin Dillon	Richard Childress Racing	Chevrolet	270	20
18	17	8	Daniel Hemric (R)	Richard Childress Racing	Chevrolet	270	19
19	31	19	Martin Truex Jr.	Joe Gibbs Racing	Toyota	270	18
20	3	24	William Byron	Hendrick Motorsports	Chevrolet	270	17
21	26	36	Matt Tifft (R)	Front Row Motorsports	Ford	270	16
22	16	32	Corey LaJoie	Go Fas Racing	Ford	270	15
23	19	6	Ryan Newman	Roush Fenway Racing	Ford	269	14
24	10	21	Paul Menard	Wood Brothers Racing	Ford	269	13
25	22	47	Ryan Preece (R)	JTG Daugherty Racing	Chevrolet	269	12
26	37	34	Michael McDowell	Front Row Motorsports	Ford	269	11
27	24	38	David Ragan	Front Row Motorsports	Ford	269	10
28	36	13	Ty Dillon	Germain Racing	Chevrolet	269	9
29	7	43	Bubba Wallace	Richard Petty Motorsports	Chevrolet	269	8
30	8	18	Kyle Busch	Joe Gibbs Racing	Toyota	268	9
31	27	15	Ross Chastain (i)	Premium Motorsports	Chevrolet	268	0
32	13	12	Ryan Blaney	Team Penske	Ford	264	5
33	23	52	Bayley Currey (i)	Rick Ware Racing	Ford	263	0
34	25	77	Quin Houff	Spire Motorsports	Chevrolet	263	3
35	29	27	Reed Sorenson	Premium Motorsports	Chevrolet	262	2
36	20	95	Matt DiBenedetto	Leavine Family Racing	Toyota	261	1
37	38	00	Landon Cassill (i)	StarCom Racing	Chevrolet	261	0
38	40	46	Joey Gase (i)	MBM Motorsports	Toyota	258	0
39	39	66	Timmy Hill (i)	MBM Motorsports	Toyota	257	0
40	28	51	Cody Ware (i)	Petty Ware Racing	Chevrolet	245	0
Official race results

=== Race statistics ===
- Lead changes: 23 among 12 different drivers
- Cautions/Laps: 7 for 41 laps
- Red flags: 0
- Time of race: 3 hours, 6 minutes and 9 seconds
- Average speed: 131.023 miles per hour (210.861 km/h)

== Media ==
=== Television ===
Fox Sports covered their ninth race at Kansas Speedway. Mike Joy, three-time Kansas winner Jeff Gordon and Darrell Waltrip called the race from the broadcast booth, while Jamie Little, Regan Smith and Matt Yocum reported from pit road.

FS1
Booth announcers	Pit reporters
Lap-by-lap: Mike Joy; Color commentator: Jeff Gordon; Color commentator: Darrell Waltrip	Jamie Little; Regan Smith; Matt Yocum

=== Radio ===
MRN had the radio call for the race which was also simulcasted on SiriusXM's NASCAR Radio channel. Alex Hayden, Jeff Striegle and Rusty Wallace called the race in the booth when the field raced through the tri-oval. Dave Moody covered the race from the Sunoco spotters stand outside turn 2 when the field raced through turns 1 and 2 and Mike Bagley called the race from a platform outside turn 4, while Jason Toy, Kim Coon, and Steve Post worked pit road.

MRN Radio
Booth announcers	Turn announcers	Pit reporters
Lead announcer: Alex Hayden; Announcer: Jeff Striegle; Announcer: Rusty Wallace	Turns 1 & 2: Dave Moody; Turns 3 & 4: Mike Bagley	Jason Toy; Kim Coon; Steve Post

== Standings after the race ==
Drivers' Championship standings

	Pos	Driver	Points
1	1	Joey Logano	478
1	2	Kyle Busch	469 (–9)
	3	Kevin Harvick	440 (–38)
3	4	Chase Elliott	423 (–55)
1	5	Brad Keselowski	421 (–57)
2	6	Denny Hamlin	404 (–74)
2	7	Martin Truex Jr.	396 (–82)
	8	Kurt Busch	387 (–91)
1	9	Clint Bowyer	357 (–121)
1	10	Ryan Blaney	340 (–138)
	11	Aric Almirola	334 (–144)
1	12	Alex Bowman	329 (–149)
1	13	Daniel Suárez	315 (–163)
2	14	Erik Jones	308 (–170)
	15	Kyle Larson	304 (–174)
1	16	Jimmie Johnson	292 (–186)
Official driver's standings

Manufacturers' Championship standings

Pos	Manufacturer	Points
1	Toyota	444
2	Ford	432 (–12)
3	Chevrolet	402 (–42)

- Note: Only the first 16 positions are included for the driver standings.
- . – Driver has clinched a position in the Monster Energy NASCAR Cup Series playoffs.

== Notes ==
Previous race: 2019 Gander RV 400	Monster Energy NASCAR Cup Series; 2019 season	Next race: 2019 Coca-Cola 600
