= Matt Yocum =

American motorsports commentator (born 1968)

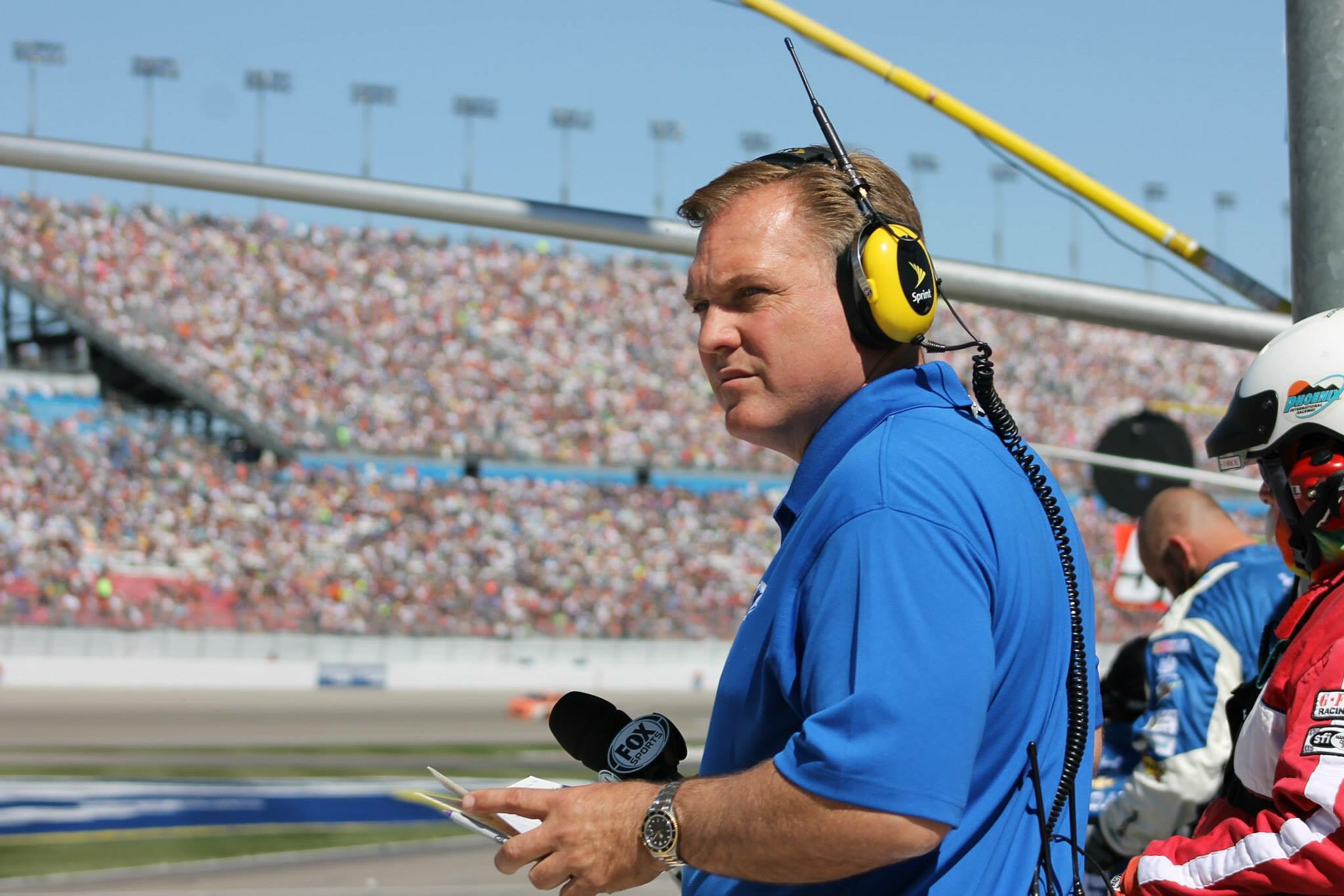
- Yocum at Las Vegas Motor Speedway in 2014
- Born: April 8, 1967 (age 59)
- Occupations: Sportscaster, Sports reporter, NASCAR reporter, Television personality
- Years active: 1992–present

Matthew Yocum is a long-standing reporter in motorsports, best known for being a NASCAR pit reporter. He works for ESPN as a pit reporter to cover the Superstar Racing Experience (SRX) as of 2023 as well as for NBC Sports as a pit reporter for the IMSA Weathertech Sportscar Championship Series. He most recently worked in that role for NASCAR on Fox for 20 years, from 2001 to 2020 as well as working for CBS to cover the SRX from 2021 to 2022. He has one daughter, Madison (11), they currently live in North Carolina.

== Biography ==
Yocum's exposure to automobile racing began at an early age. This was due, at least in part, to the fact that his mother has been involved in automobile racing for over 35 years owning her own sponsor services and motorsports management company. In high school and college Yocum began working for the International Race of Champions (IROC) as a tire specialist and eventually moved on to racecar preparation and maintenance. In 1991, Yocum graduated from Florida State University with a degree in political science and communications.

== Career ==
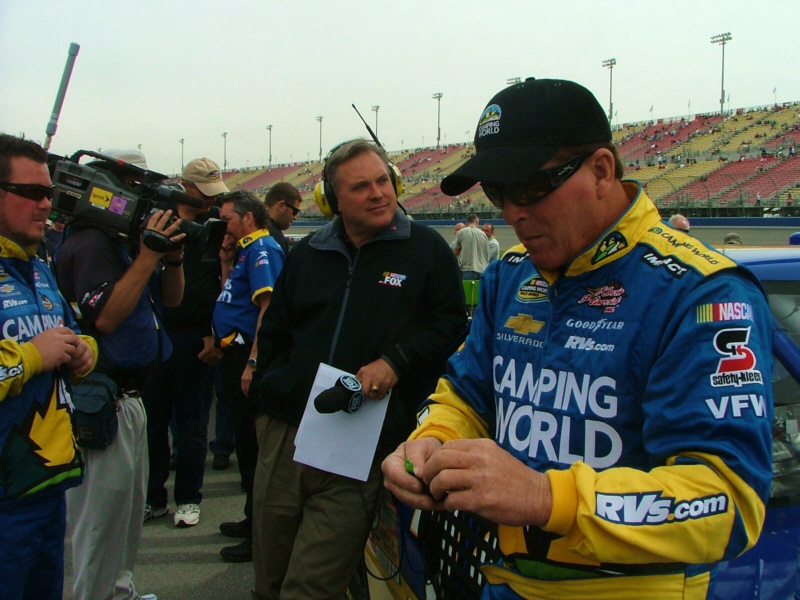
Yocum preparing to interview Ron Hornaday Jr. in 2009.

Yocum began his broadcast career in 1992 as a sports reporter and anchor with NBC affiliates in Orlando, Florida and Bristol, Tennessee. In 1995, he joined TNN (The Nashville Network) as a pit reporter and Motorsports Bureau reporter. He also appeared on the network’s racing magazine show, "Raceday". From 1995 through 1998, Yocum covered an array of motorsports events on TNN, including NASCAR Winston Cup, Busch Grand National, Craftsman Trucks, Busch Grand National North, ARCA, as well as other series. During that time, Yocum was awarded several honors and awards, including two Associated Press Sports Feature Awards in 1995, and a pair of Telly Awards in 1997 for his special report on NASCAR's greatest drivers as well as his outstanding pit reporting at that year's All-Star race.

During the 1999 and 2000 seasons, Yocum’s talent for motorsports reporting was put to use working for ESPN in a number ways including televised reporting for SportsCenter, RPM2night, and NASCAR2Day and as a radio broadcaster for RPMnow radio and ESPN radio. He also wrote a regular column for ESPN.com.

In 2001, Yocum joined the Turner Sports team as the first NASCAR reporter scheduled to cover every Cup series race telecast on TNT, Fox, and NBC and the only broadcaster to work for both Fox and NBC at the same time.

In 2007, three time NASCAR Sprint Cup Champion Tony Stewart welcomed Yocum as co-host of his two-hour weekly radio show. The show was titled "Tony Stewart Live" and broadcast on Sirius Satellite Radio. The show was primarily a commentary on current events in NASCAR as well as a listener call in show. The show ran from 2007 through 2008.

On November 18, 2020, Yocum tweeted that he would not be a part of the NASCAR on Fox broadcasting team in 2021. It is unclear by the statement he posted if he was released by the network in light of budget cuts due to COVID-19 (Fox released Truck Series pit reporter Alan Cavanna a week earlier) or if it was his decision to leave.

On April 14, 2021, it was announced that Yocum will be a pit reporter for the Superstar Racing Experience (SRX) racing series for CBS starting in 2021.

On December 12, 2022, SRX announced that they had signed a deal with ESPN to broadcast the series as part of Thursday Night Thunder beginning in 2023.
