= Landon Cassill =

American racing driver (born 1989)

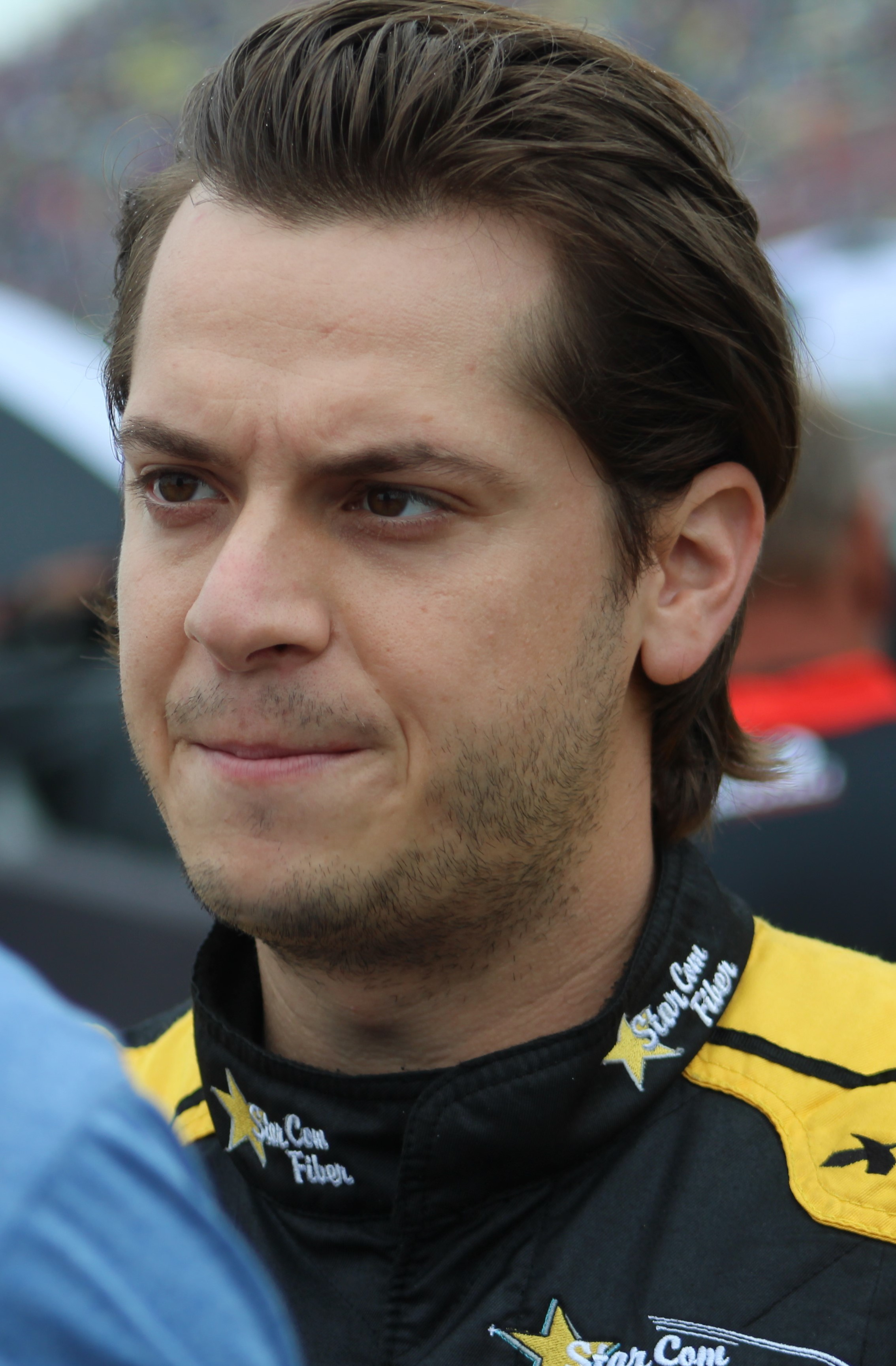
- Cassill at Michigan International Speedway in 2018
- Born: Landon Douglas Cassill; July 7, 1989 (age 37); Cedar Rapids, Iowa, U.S.
- Awards: 2008 NASCAR Nationwide Series Rookie of the Year

NASCAR Cup Series career
- 343 races run over 12 years
- 2022 position: 43rd
- Best finish: 29th (2016)
- First race: 2010 Heluva Good! Sour Cream Dips 400 (Michigan)
- Last race: 2022 NASCAR Cup Series Championship Race (Phoenix)
Wins	Top tens	Poles
0	2	0

NASCAR O'Reilly Auto Parts Series career
- 209 races run over 13 years
- 2022 position: 13th
- Best finish: 12th (2014)
- First race: 2007 Gateway 250 (Gateway)
- Last race: 2022 NASCAR Xfinity Series Championship Race (Phoenix)
Wins	Top tens	Poles
0	22	1

NASCAR FedEx Freight Truck Series career
- 8 races run over 2 years
- 2010 position: 119th
- Best finish: 31st (2008)
- First race: 2008 O'Reilly Auto Parts 250 (Kansas)
- Last race: 2010 NextEra Energy Resources 250 (Daytona)
Wins	Top tens	Poles
0	3	0

ARCA Menards Series career
- 4 races run over 2 years
- Best finish: 85th (2008)
- First race: 2007 WLWT Channel 5 150 (Kentucky)
- Last race: 2008 ARCA Re/Max 250 (Talladega)
Wins	Top tens	Poles
0	1	0

ARCA Menards Series East career
- 3 races run over 2 years
- Best finish: 37th (2007)
- First race: 2007 South Boston 150 (South Boston)
- Last race: 2015 Drive Sober 125 (Dover)
Wins	Top tens	Poles
0	2	0

ARCA Menards Series West career
- 1 race run over 1 year
- Best finish: 43rd (2015)
- First race: 2015 Casino Arizona 100 (Phoenix)
Wins	Top tens	Poles
0	1	0
- Statistics up to date as of November 4, 2022.

Landon Douglas Cassill (born July 7, 1989) is an American former professional stock car racing driver. He last competed full-time in the NASCAR Xfinity Series, driving the No. 10 Chevrolet Camaro for Kaulig Racing.

== Early career ==
Cassill was born in Cedar Rapids, Iowa, and began racing on a quad when he was three years old. Cassill moved to go-karts. He finished second in the Pro Kart Tour at Atlanta Motor Speedway at the age of ten. The following year, he earned his first of two Kart Series national championships. Cassill won four International Kart Federation (IKF) championships, some on dirt and some on asphalt.

In 2000, Cassill competed in three different classes: two karting classes and a midget class. He won all three state championships on the same night. Cassill won four more state championships at the Newton Kart Klub in Newton, Iowa, in 2001. He then started racing in a modified at the half-mile Hawkeye Downs.

He was racing in the ASA Late Model Series (ASALMS) in 2003 while he was in high school at Jefferson High School in Cedar Rapids. He has also raced in legend, modified, and late model racecars. Other series include the American Speed Association and the CRA Super Series.

At age 16, he became the youngest winner in ASALMS history when he won at Lake Erie Speedway on June 9, 2006; holding the record until Erik Jones surpassed him at the age of fourteen in 2010. On July 3, Cassill won his second ASALMS race, this time in a Southern Division race at South Georgia Motorsports Park near Cecil, Georgia. The win made him the first driver to win in both the Northern and Southern Divisions. He won his first Challenge Division race at I-70 Speedway on July 8, 2010, to become the first driver to win in all three divisions. For 196 laps, Cassill held the runner-up position on the track to Peter Casilino. He secured victory by edging Casilino off the track. Answering questions afterward about the win, Cassill replied, "Hey rubbin's just racin what can I say!"

He finished second in the Challenge Division points behind Kelly Bires, and eleventh in the Northern Division despite starting in half of the races.

== NASCAR ==
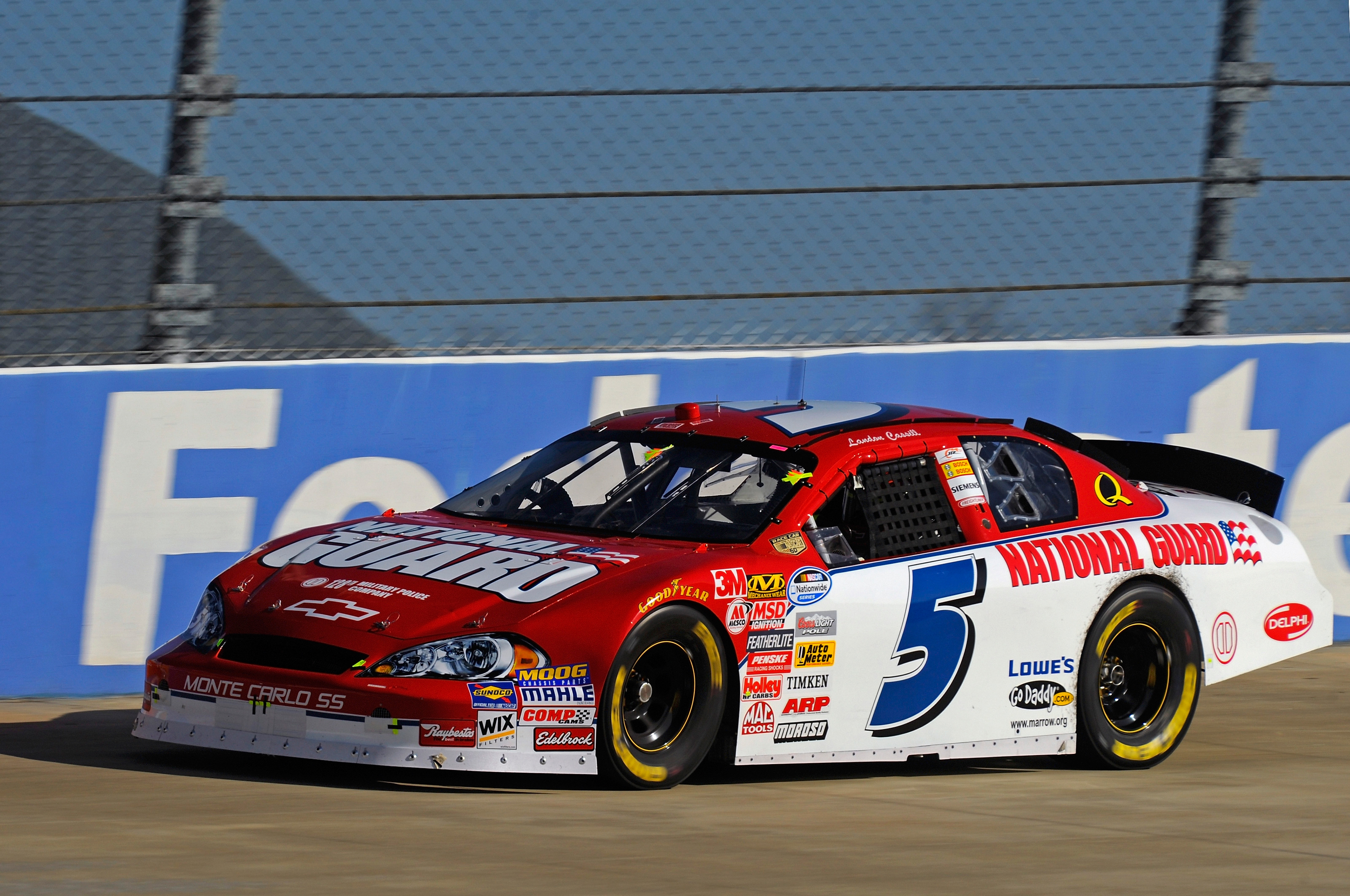
2008 Nationwide car

In 2006, Cassill was introduced to NASCAR through the GM Racing Development competition. He was one of 16 drivers that participated in the three-stage evaluation process that took place at Caraway Speedway in Asheboro, North Carolina, North Georgia Speedway in Chatsworth, Georgia, and Nashville Superspeedway.

Cassill was signed by Hendrick Motorsports in December 2006. In 2007, Cassill tested the team's Car of Tomorrow car at Lakeland Speedway and Greenville-Pickens Speedway. Along with his driving duties, Cassill has worked in the team's research and development program and drove during practices for the Hendrick pit crews. Cassill made his Nationwide Series debut at Gateway International Speedway in July 2007 after turning eighteen, as NASCAR requires national series drivers to be at least eighteen years of age (regional series drivers can be sixteen). Cassill finished 32nd in his debut. He was in contention to score his first top-ten finish at Memphis before another driver spun him out on the final lap. In his six starts that year, his best finish was eighteenth at Dover.

In 2008, Cassill drove the No. 5 National Guard Chevrolet in sixteen Nationwide series races for JR Motorsports and the No. 4 Phoenix Racing Chevrolet in the three road course races. In Cassill's first start of the season, at Nashville, he started 22nd and finished nineteenth, two laps down. He earned his first top-ten finish in the June race at Nashville with a ninth place finish. He won his first pole at Loudon, but had to start at the back of the field due to an engine change. He quickly moved his way up in the race but was wrecked by Bobby Hamilton Jr., resulting in a 34th place finish. He was involved in another incident with Hamilton Jr. at Memphis which resulted in an altercation following the race. In nineteen starts, Cassill earned five top-ten finishes and won Rookie of the Year honors. He also drove a limited schedule in the Truck Series for Randy Moss Motorsports; garnering three top-ten finishes. Cassill made his lone 2009 start on October 24 at Memphis; driving Phoenix Racing's No. 1 Miccosukee Chevrolet to a tenth place finish.

In 2010, he drove the No. 98 truck for Thorsport Racing in the NextEra Energy Resources 250 at Daytona, but was caught in an accident on the first lap of the race. He made six starts in the Nationwide Series: three in the No. 7 Chevrolet for JR Motorsports and another three in the No. 09 Ford for RAB Racing. Cassill made his Cup Series debut at Michigan; driving for veteran team owner James Finch. He finished 38th in his Cup debut. He ran fifteen other races that year for Finch, TRG Motorsports, and Larry Gunselman.

Cassill started the 2011 season with a third place finish in the opening Nationwide series race: the DRIVE4COPD 300 at Daytona. It would be his lone Nationwide start of the year. He drove in three Sprint Cup races for Germain Racing before moving over to Phoenix Racing. Cassill competed in 32 of the 36 races that year, with his best effort in the Heluva Good! Sour Cream Dips 400 at Michigan, where he started and finished twelfth. After the end of the season, he was replaced for 2012 in the Phoenix Racing No. 51 by Kurt Busch.

In early February 2012, it was announced that Cassill would drive for Front Row Motorsports in the 2012 Daytona 500, driving the No. 26 Ford, but the deal fell through as Cassill received a full-season offer. Shortly after it was announced that Cassill would drive the No. 83 in 2012, driving for a new team, BK Racing, that purchased the assets and owners' points of the former Red Bull Racing Team. Cassill would go on to finish 31st in season points.

=== 2013–2017 ===
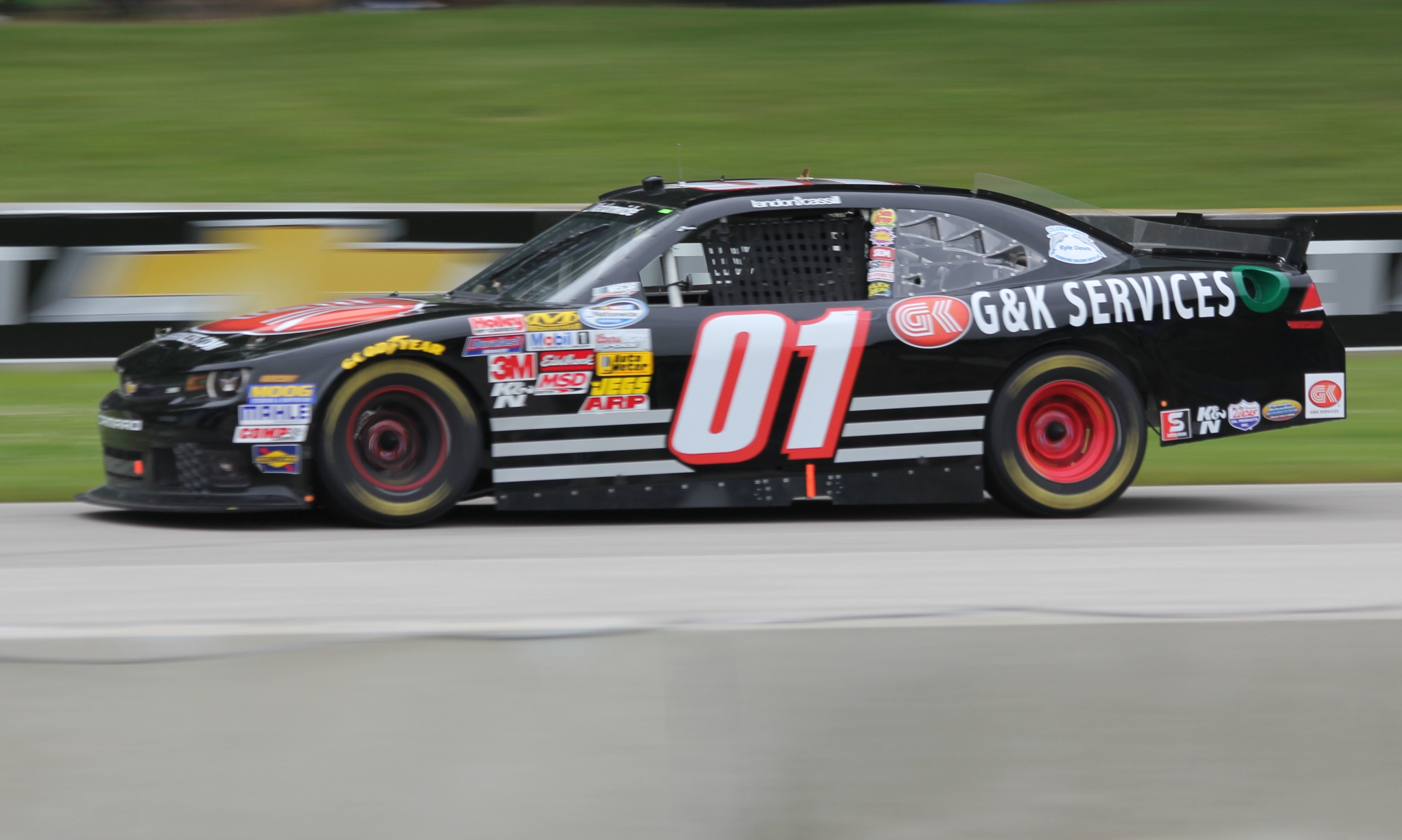
Cassill at Road America in June 2014

On January 17, 2013, it was announced that Cassill would leave BK Racing due to contract disagreements. In late February, he joined Circle Sport, driving the team's No. 33 in the Sprint Cup Series for the remainder of the season. In early March, it was revealed that Cassill was suing BK Racing for a claim of unpaid winnings. Later in the season, starting at the Brickyard 400, Cassill began running in the No. 40, jointly fielded by Circle Sport and Hillman Racing, in a majority of races.

In December 2013, it was announced that Cassill would return to the No. 4 Chevrolet in the 2014 NASCAR Nationwide Series for JD Motorsports, replacing Mike Wallace as the team's lead driver, in addition to returning to the No. 40 Chevrolet for Circle Sport in the Sprint Cup Series.

In the 2014 Cup season, Cassill tied his career-best finish of twelfth at the Daytona 500, and recorded his best career finish of fourth at the Geico 500. Carsforsale.com was the primary sponsor of Landon Cassill during these and four other races including Kansas Speedway, Sonoma Raceway, Indianapolis Motor Speedway, and Michigan International Speedway.

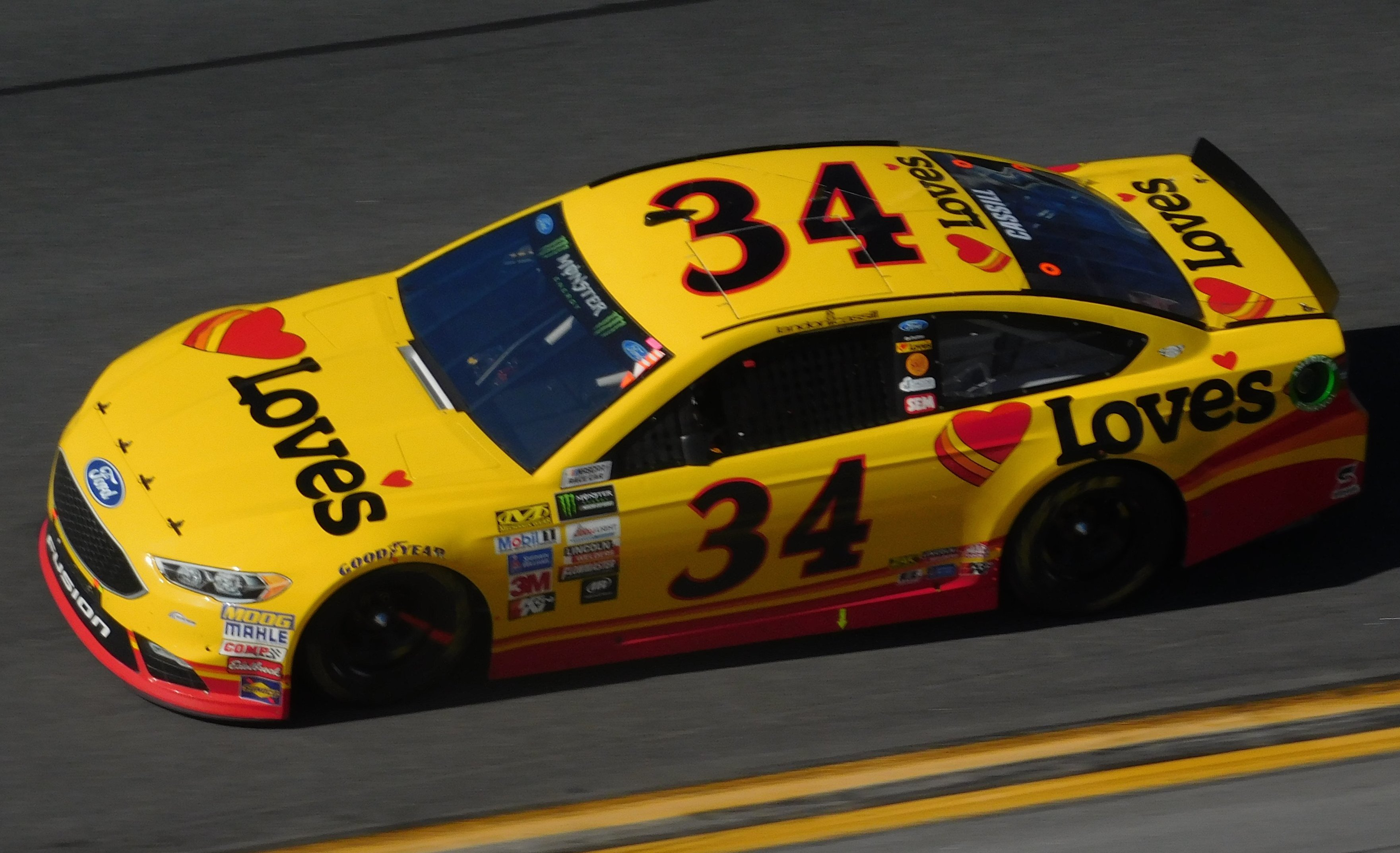
Cassill's No. 34 during the 2017 Daytona 500

On December 16, 2014, G&K Services re-upped as a full-time associate sponsor with multiple primary sponsorships in select markets. Those races include Las Vegas Motor Speedway, Phoenix International Raceway, Texas Motor Speedway, Talladega Superspeedway, Bristol Motor Speedway, and Chicagoland Speedway.

On February 2, 2015, Snap Fitness returned to the No. 40 team for a second year, sponsoring the races at Atlanta, the All-Star Showdown, Charlotte Motor Speedway, Michigan International Speedway, and Darlington Raceway. On February 11, it was announced that Cassill would partner with Carsforsale.com for a second year. Carsforsale.com sponsored the Daytona 500 and five other Sprint Cup races in the 2015 season. He ran very strongly in the 2015 Coke Zero 400, but his underfunded car was involved in a massive crash on the last lap at the checkered flag; he would finish thirteenth.

With Hillman joining Premium Motorsports, Cassill lost his No. 40 ride. In 2016, Cassill joined Front Row Motorsports, driving the No. 38 Ford Fusion. During the Texas race, a big one occurred on lap 271, Cassill barely made it through. Cassill had his best performance of the season in the Food City 500, where he led twenty laps on a contrary fuel strategy to a 22nd-place finish.

Cassill returned to FRM in 2017, though he drove the No. 34 as David Ragan returned to the team in the No. 38. His main sponsors were Starkey Hearing Foundation, CSX (Play it safe), and Love's Travel Stops.

It was announced on October 10, 2017, that Cassill would not be returning to Front Row Motorsports in 2018.

=== 2018–2023 ===
After losing his ride in 2017, Cassill came into the 2018 season as a free agent. Following the release of Jeffrey Earnhardt from StarCom Racing, Cassill was announced as the new driver of the No. 00 Chevrolet Camaro with sponsorship from the United States First Responders Association beginning at Martinsville. Cassill finished last after mechanical failure took the car out of the event. The following race proved much better, as Cassill finished 21st. Cassill would return once again at Bristol with sponsorship from Superior Essex and TW Cable where he would finish in the 20th position. At Homestead, he drove the No. 89 car fielded by Morgan Shepherd's Shepherd Racing Ventures team.

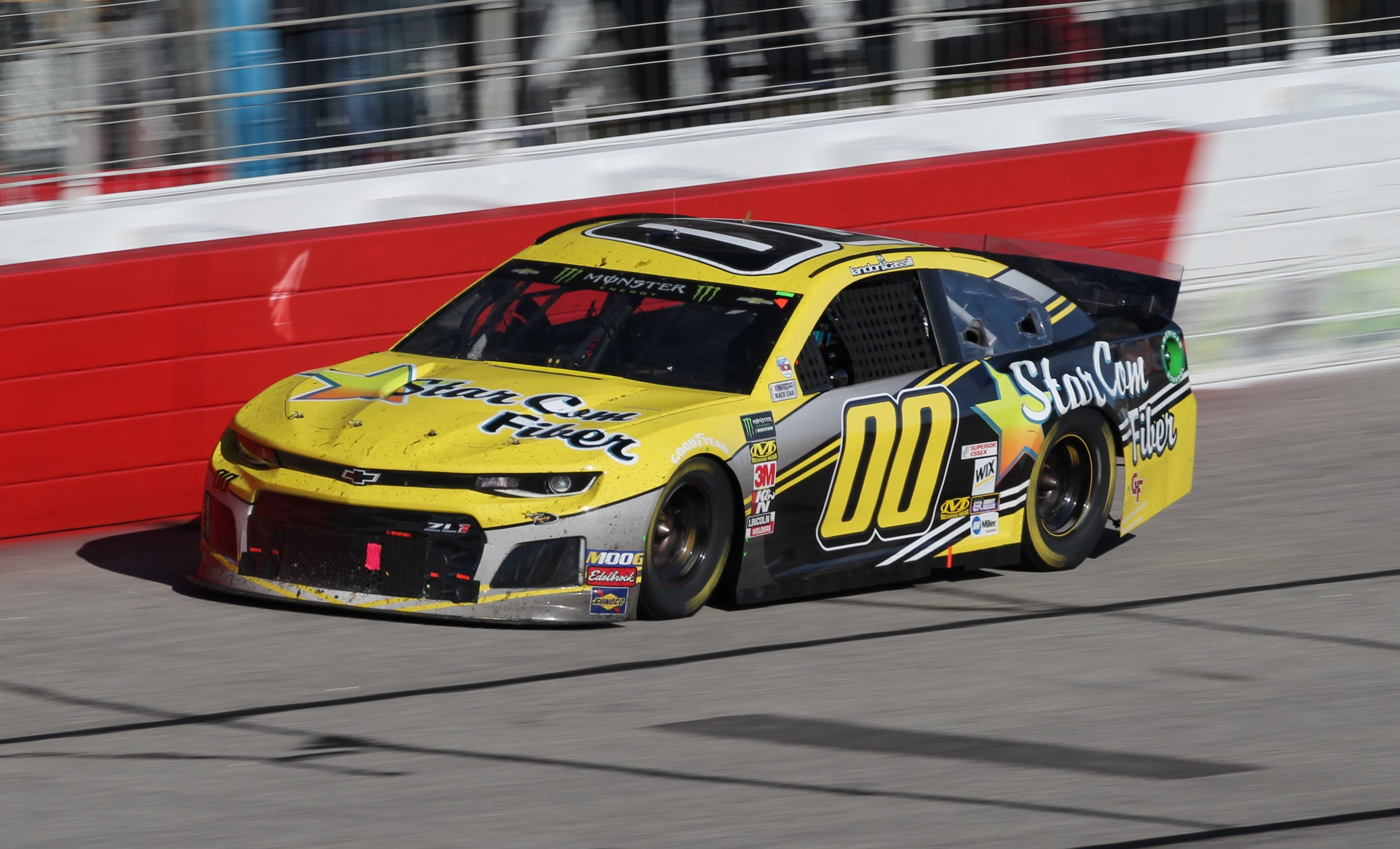
Cassill at Atlanta Motor Speedway in 2019

On December 17, 2018, it was announced that Cassill would drive the No. 00 car full-time in 2019. During the year, Cassill had the lowest crash rate among Cup drivers.

In April 2019, Cassill returned to JD Motorsports for the Talladega Xfinity race, driving the No. 4 as usual driver Ross Chastain was with Kaulig Racing for the event. He also ran ten Xfinity races for Shepherd Racing Ventures, failing to finish all but one as the team could not afford to run the full distance. Regardless, Cassill was able to qualify ninth in the Rhino Pro Truck Outfitters 300 at Las Vegas, the team's first top-ten qualifying effort since 2009. For the season-ending Ford EcoBoost 300 at Homestead, the team acquired enough sponsorship to enable the No. 89 to race the entire event. After qualifying thirteenth, Cassill finished fifteenth for the team's first completed race since 2013 and their first top-fifteen run since 2009.

Although he was under contract for the 2020 season, Cassill lost his ride at StarCom to Quin Houff. Thus, he planned to run a full Xfinity schedule for Shepherd Racing Ventures pending funding. After skipping the opener at Daytona, Cassill entered the next three races before the season was impacted by the COVID-19 pandemic; sponsorship troubles due to the pandemic prevented SRV from returning for the rest of the year. Cassill instead served as a substitute in the event of a driver testing positive for COVID-19, though his duties were ultimately not required.

In 2021, Cassill rejoined JD Motorsports and the No. 4 for the full Xfinity season. Ahead of the Dover race in May, Cassill swapped cars with JDM teammate Ryan Vargas and moved to the No. 6 to help it accumulate owner points. At the time of the switch, the No. 6 was 37th in owner points, which would have jeopardized its qualifying ability for later races. He scored no top-tens, failed to qualify for the season finale at Phoenix, and finished 22nd in the final standings.

On December 9, 2021, Kaulig Racing announced that Cassill would replace Jeb Burton in the No. 10, bringing sponsorship funding from Voyager Digital as it signed a two-year extension. His best run of the 2022 season would come at New Hampshire, leading seventeen laps and finishing third although he was disqualified in post-race technical inspection and would be scored 37th.

On January 18, 2023, Cassill announced that he would not be returning to Kaulig full-time for the 2023 season due to Voyager Digital filing for bankruptcy midway through last season. In May 2024, he paid US$25,000 as part of a US$2.42 million deal by himself, Rob Gronkowski, and Victor Oladipo to settle a class-action lawsuit filed by individuals who invested in Voyager.

== Motorsports career results ==
=== Career summary ===
Season	Series	Team(s)	Races	Wins	Top 5s	Top 10s	Poles	Points	Position
2007	NASCAR Busch Series	Hendrick Motorsports	6	0	0	0	0	510	72nd
2007	NASCAR Busch East Series	Hendrick Motorsports	2	0	1	1	0	281	37th
2007	ARCA Re/Max Series	Hendrick Motorsports	2	0	0	0	0	150	131st
2008	ARCA Re/Max Series	Hendrick Motorsports	2	0	0	1	0	230	85th
2008	NASCAR Craftsman Truck Series	Morgan-Dollar Motorsports	7	0	1	3	0	892	31st
2008	NASCAR Craftsman Truck Series	Randy Moss Motorsports	7	0	1	3	0	892	31st
2008	NASCAR Nationwide Series	JR Motorsports	19	0	0	5	1	2092	26th
2008	NASCAR Nationwide Series	Jay Robinson Racing	19	0	0	5	1	2092	26th
2009	NASCAR Nationwide Series	Phoenix Racing	1	0	0	1	0	134	115th
2010	NASCAR Camping World Truck Series	ThorSport Racing	1	0	0	0	0	55	119th
2010	NASCAR Nationwide Series	JR Motorsports	6	0	0	0	0	483	69th
2010	NASCAR Nationwide Series	RAB Racing	6	0	0	0	0	483	69th
2010	NASCAR Sprint Cup Series	Phoenix Racing	16	0	0	0	0	717	47th
2010	NASCAR Sprint Cup Series	TRG Motorsports	16	0	0	0	0	717	47th
2010	NASCAR Sprint Cup Series	Gunselman Motorsports	16	0	0	0	0	717	47th
2011	NASCAR Sprint Cup Series	Germain Racing	32	0	0	0	0	0^{1}	55th
2011	NASCAR Sprint Cup Series	Phoenix Racing	32	0	0	0	0	0^{1}	55th
2011	NASCAR Nationwide Series	Phoenix Racing	1	0	1	1	0	41	65th
2012	NASCAR Sprint Cup Series	BK Racing	36	0	0	0	0	598	31st
2013	NASCAR Sprint Cup Series	Circle Sport	33	0	0	0	0	0^{2}	61st
2013	NASCAR Nationwide Series	JD Motorsports	23	0	0	0	0	359^{2}	24th
2014	NASCAR Sprint Cup Series	Hillman Racing	34	0	1	1	0	0^{1}	56th
2014	NASCAR Nationwide Series	JD Motorsports	33	0	0	3	0	800	12th
2015	NASCAR Sprint Cup Series	Hillman Smith Motorsports	36	0	0	0	0	0^{1}	55th
2015	NASCAR Xfinity Series	JD Motorsports	29	0	0	2	0	637	18th
2015	NASCAR K&N Pro Series East	Ranier Racing with MDM	1	0	0	1	0	36	47th
2015	NASCAR K&N Pro Series West	Ranier Racing with MDM	1	0	1	1	0	39	43rd
2016	NASCAR Sprint Cup Series	Front Row Motorsports	36	0	0	0	0	530	29th
2017	Monster Energy NASCAR Cup Series	Front Row Motorsports	36	0	0	0	0	382	31st
2018	Monster Energy NASCAR Cup Series	StarCom Racing	29	0	0	0	0	0^{1}	57th
2018	NASCAR Xfinity Series	JD Motorsports	5	0	0	0	0	59	48th
2018	NASCAR Xfinity Series	MBM Motorsports	5	0	0	0	0	59	48th
2018	NASCAR Xfinity Series	Shepherd Racing Ventures	5	0	0	0	0	59	48th
2019	Monster Energy NASCAR Cup Series	StarCom Racing	36	0	0	0	0	0*^{3}	43rd
2019	NASCAR Xfinity Series	JD Motorsports	16	0	0	2	0	175	32nd
2019	NASCAR Xfinity Series	Shepherd Racing Ventures	16	0	0	2	0	175	32nd
2020	NASCAR Xfinity Series	Shepherd Racing Ventures	4	0	0	0	0	5	69th
2021	NASCAR Cup Series	Gaunt Brothers Racing	2	0	0	0	0	0	57th
2021	NASCAR Xfinity Series	JD Motorsports	32	0	0	0	0	465	22nd
NASCAR Cup Series			343	0	2	2	0		
NASCAR Xfinity Series			209	0	6	26	1		
NASCAR Camping World Truck Series			8	0	1	3	0		
NASCAR K&N Pro Series East			3	0	1	2	0		
NASCAR K&N Pro Series West			1	0	1	1	0		
ARCA Re/Max Series			4	0	0	1	0		

=== NASCAR ===
(key) (Bold – Pole position awarded by qualifying time. Italics – Pole position earned by points standings or practice time. * – Most laps led.)

==== Cup Series ====
NASCAR Cup Series results
Year	Team	No.	Make	1	2	3	4	5	6	7	8	9	10	11	12	13	14	15	16	17	18	19	20	21	22	23	24	25	26	27	28	29	30	31	32	33	34	35	36	NCSC	Pts	Ref
2010	Phoenix Racing	09	Chevy	DAY	CAL	LVS	ATL	BRI	MAR	PHO	TEX	TAL	RCH	DAR	DOV	CLT	POC	MCH; 38	SON	NHA	DAY			POC; 41	GLN	MCH; 38		ATL; DNQ						CLT; 42			TEX; 40			47th	717	
2010	TRG Motorsports	71	Chevy																			CHI; 39	IND; 39				BRI; 37		RCH; 33		DOV; 38									47th	717	
2010	Gunselman Motorsports	64	Toyota																											NHA; 42		KAN; 43	CAL; 40		MAR; 42	TAL; DNQ		PHO; 40	HOM; 40	47th	717	
2011	Germain Racing	60	Toyota	DAY	PHO; 38	LVS; 43	BRI; 42																																	55th	0^{1}	
2011	Phoenix Racing	09	Chevy					CAL; 24	MAR; 26	TEX; 28	TAL; 31	RCH; 31	DAR; 29	DOV; 30	CLT; 35																									55th	0^{1}	
2011	Phoenix Racing	51	Chevy													KAN; 35	POC; 24	MCH; 12	SON	DAY; 26	KEN; 23	NHA; 26	IND; 20	POC; 27	GLN	MCH; 31	BRI	ATL; 22	RCH; 25	CHI; 30	NHA; 33	DOV; 31	KAN; 17	CLT; 28	TAL; 16	MAR; 42	TEX; 26	PHO; 29	HOM; 36	55th	0^{1}	
2012	BK Racing	83	Toyota	DAY; 22	PHO; 35	LVS; 36	BRI; 29	CAL; 36	MAR; 29	TEX; 30	KAN; 34	RCH; 20	TAL; 34	DAR; 26	CLT; 18	DOV; 38	POC; 43	MCH; 18	SON; 31	KEN; 25	DAY; 32	NHA; 29	IND; 25	POC; 26	GLN; 23	MCH; 25	BRI; 24	ATL; 20	RCH; 19	CHI; 29	NHA; 27	DOV; 36	TAL; 30	CLT; 26	KAN; 18	MAR; 19	TEX; 26	PHO; 25	HOM; 27	31st	598	
2013	Circle Sport	33	Chevy	DAY	PHO; 32	LVS; 42	BRI; 33	CAL; 30	MAR; 33	TEX; 34	KAN; 29	RCH; 25	TAL; 22	DAR; 30	CLT; 37	DOV; 32	POC; 38	MCH	SON	KEN; 36	DAY; 24	NHA; 32				MCH; 32						DOV; 38	KAN; 33		TAL; 37				HOM; 33	61st	0^{2}	
2013	Circle Sport	40	Chevy																				IND; 33	POC; 29	GLN; 28		BRI; 23	ATL; 37	RCH; 34	CHI; 29	NHA; 34			CLT; 33		MAR; 29	TEX; 34	PHO; 42		61st	0^{2}	
2014	Hillman Racing	40	Chevy	DAY; 12	PHO; DNQ	LVS; DNQ	BRI; 30	CAL; 25	MAR; 25	TEX; 34	DAR; 25	RCH; 26	TAL; 11	KAN; 42	CLT; 36	DOV; 34	POC; 33	MCH; 35	SON; 43	KEN; 32	DAY; 31	NHA; 34	IND; 30	POC; 41	GLN; 29	MCH; 29	BRI; 22	ATL; 31	RCH; 34	CHI; 28	NHA; 25	DOV; 35	KAN; 21	CLT; 23	TAL; 4	MAR; 19	TEX; 43	PHO; 29	HOM; 29	56th	0^{1}	
2015	Hillman Smith Motorsports	40	Chevy	DAY; 43	ATL; 43	LVS; 35	PHO; 37	CAL; 25	MAR; 21	TEX; 32	BRI; 43	RCH; 26	TAL; 39	KAN; 29	CLT; 39	DOV; 23	POC; 25	MCH; 31	SON; 36	DAY; 13	KEN; 28	NHA; 30	IND; 26	POC; 14	GLN; 35	MCH; 36	BRI; 38	DAR; 20	RCH; 30	CHI; 27	NHA; 38	DOV; 40	CLT; 23	KAN; 43	TAL; 34	MAR; 21	TEX; 25	PHO; 35	HOM; 35	55th	0^{1}	
2016	Front Row Motorsports	38	Ford	DAY; 23	ATL; 36	LVS; 28	PHO; 25	CAL; 16	MAR; 28	TEX; 25	BRI; 22	RCH; 27	TAL; 11	KAN; 31	DOV; 19	CLT; 27	POC; 36	MCH; 25	SON; 29	DAY; 31	KEN; 29	NHA; 28	IND; 20	POC; 30	GLN; 23	BRI; 20	MCH; 39	DAR; 30	RCH; 36	CHI; 29	NHA; 29	DOV; 29	CLT; 19	KAN; 27	TAL; 21	MAR; 29	TEX; 29	PHO; 20	HOM; 21	29th	530	
2017	Front Row Motorsports	34	Ford	DAY; 16	ATL; 22	LVS; 27	PHO; 28	CAL; 27	MAR; 27	TEX; 29	BRI; 32	RCH; 21	TAL; 29	KAN; 21	CLT; 28	DOV; 36	POC; 27	MCH; 32	SON; 30	DAY; 19	KEN; 26	NHA; 23	IND; 22	POC; 29	GLN; 36	MCH; 25	BRI; 35	DAR; 21	RCH; 39	CHI; 20	NHA; 25	DOV; 29	CLT; 25	TAL; 28	KAN; 23	MAR; 23	TEX; 26	PHO; 24	HOM; 23	31st	382	
2018	StarCom Racing	00	Chevy	DAY	ATL	LVS	PHO	CAL	MAR; 38	TEX; 21	BRI; 20	RCH; 34	TAL	DOV; 31	KAN; 25	CLT; 28	POC; 31	MCH; 32	SON	CHI; 36		KEN; 33	NHA; 37	POC; 34	GLN; 31	MCH; 29	BRI; 25	DAR; 30	IND; 31	LVS; 18		ROV; 29	DOV; 33		KAN; 29		TEX; 35	PHO; 26	HOM; 31	57th	0^{1}	
2018	StarCom Racing	99	Chevy																		DAY; 24										RCH; 36			TAL; 22		MAR; 32				57th	0^{1}	
2019	StarCom Racing	00	Chevy	DAY; 24	ATL; 33	LVS; 32	PHO; 33	CAL; 29	MAR; 28	TEX; 30	BRI; 26	RCH; 35	TAL; 34	DOV; 31	KAN; 37	CLT; 37	POC; 31	MCH; 29	SON; 31	CHI; 31	DAY; 11	KEN; 32	NHA; 26	POC; 28	GLN; 29	MCH; 30	BRI; 25	DAR; 25	IND; 40	LVS; 29	RCH; 28	ROV; 28	DOV; 26	TAL; 14	KAN; 37	MAR; 26	TEX; 27	PHO; 33	HOM; 28	45th	0^{3}	
2021	Gaunt Brothers Racing	96	Toyota	DAY	DRC	HOM	LVS	PHO	ATL	BRD	MAR	RCH	TAL	KAN	DAR	DOV	COA	CLT	SON	NSH	POC	POC	ROA	ATL	NHA	GLN	IRC	MCH	DAY; 36	DAR	RCH	BRI	LVS	TAL; 24	ROV	TEX	KAN	MAR	PHO	57th	0^{1}	
2022	Spire Motorsports	77	Chevy	DAY; 15	CAL	LVS	PHO; 30	ATL	COA	RCH; 32	MAR	BRD	TAL; 19	DOV	DAR; 22	KAN	CLT	GTW	SON	NSH	ROA	ATL; 24	NHA	POC	IRC	MCH	RCH; 30	GLN	DAY; 4	DAR; 25	KAN; 24	BRI; 22	TEX; 22	TAL; 11	ROV	LVS; 32	HOM; 29	MAR; 32	PHO; 36	43rd	0^{1}	

===== Daytona 500 =====
Year	Team	Manufacturer	Start	Finish
2012	BK Racing	Toyota	39	22
2014	Hillman Racing	Chevrolet	18	12
2015	Hillman Smith Motorsports	Chevrolet	17	43
2016	Front Row Motorsports	Ford	24	23
2017	Front Row Motorsports	Ford	27	16
2019	StarCom Racing	Chevrolet	27	24
2022	Spire Motorsports	Chevrolet	27	15

==== Xfinity Series ====
NASCAR Xfinity Series results
Year	Team	No.	Make	1	2	3	4	5	6	7	8	9	10	11	12	13	14	15	16	17	18	19	20	21	22	23	24	25	26	27	28	29	30	31	32	33	34	35	NXSC	Pts	Ref
2007	Hendrick Motorsports	24	Chevy	DAY	CAL	MXC	LVS	ATL	BRI	NSH	TEX	PHO	TAL	RCH	DAR	CLT	DOV	NSH	KEN	MLW	NHA	DAY	CHI	GTY; 32	IRP; 30	CGV	GLN	MCH	BRI	CAL	RCH; 22						PHO; 34	HOM	72nd	510	
2007	Hendrick Motorsports	5	Chevy																													DOV; 18	KAN	CLT	MEM; 20	TEX			72nd	510	
2008	JR Motorsports	5	Chevy	DAY	CAL	LVS	ATL	BRI	NSH; 19	TEX	PHO; 22			RCH; 23	DAR	CLT	DOV; 25	NSH; 9	KEN; 11	MLW; 22	**NHA**; 34	DAY	CHI; 10	GTY; 6	IRP; 7				BRI; 22	CAL	RCH; 12	DOV; 25	KAN	CLT	MEM; 13	TEX	PHO; 6	HOM	26th	2092	
2008	Jay Robinson Racing	4	Chevy									MXC; 23	TAL													CGV; 14	GLN; 31	MCH											26th	2092	
2009	Phoenix Racing	1	Chevy	DAY	CAL	LVS	BRI	TEX	NSH	PHO	TAL	RCH	DAR	CLT	DOV	NSH	KEN	MLW	NHA	DAY	CHI	GTY	IRP	IOW	GLN	MCH	BRI	CGV	ATL	RCH	DOV	KAN	CAL	CLT	MEM; 10	TEX	PHO	HOM	115th	134	
2010	JR Motorsports	7	Chevy	DAY	CAL	LVS	BRI	NSH	PHO; 35	TEX; 18	TAL	RCH	DAR	DOV; 20	CLT	NSH	KEN	ROA	NHA	DAY																			69th	483	
2010	RAB Racing	09	Ford																		CHI; 33	GTY; 31	IRP	IOW	GLN	MCH	BRI	CGV	ATL	RCH; 28	DOV	KAN	CAL	CLT	GTY	TEX	PHO	HOM	69th	483	
2011	Phoenix Racing	1	Chevy	DAY; 3	PHO	LVS	BRI	CAL	TEX	TAL	NSH	RCH	DAR	DOV	IOW	CLT	CHI	MCH	ROA	DAY	KEN	NHA	NSH	IRP	IOW	GLN	CGV	BRI	ATL	RCH	CHI	DOV	KAN	CLT	TEX	PHO	HOM		65th	41	
2013	JD Motorsports	4	Chevy	DAY	PHO	LVS	BRI	CAL; QL^{†}	TEX; 36	RCH; 19	TAL; 17	DAR; 23	CLT; 21	DOV; 22	IOW	MCH; 26	ROA; 39	KEN; 36	DAY; 23	NHA; 30	CHI; 21	IND; 25	IOW	GLN; 17	MOH	BRI; 23	ATL; 19	RCH; 23	CHI; 22	KEN	DOV; 19	KAN; 22	CLT; 32	TEX; 24	PHO	HOM; 33			24th	359^{2}	
2014	JD Motorsports	01	Chevy	DAY; 21	PHO; 19	LVS; 19	BRI; 12	CAL; 35	TEX; 33	DAR; 12	RCH; 13	TAL; 8	IOW; 10	CLT; 30	DOV; 14	MCH; 14	ROA; 8	KEN; 13	DAY; 30	NHA; 15	CHI; 21	IND; 16	IOW; 13	GLN; 33	MOH; 14	BRI; 22	ATL; 15	RCH; 14	CHI; 16	KEN; 29	DOV; 16	KAN; 34	CLT; 17	TEX; 19	PHO; 32	HOM; 35			12th	800	
2015	JD Motorsports	01	Chevy	DAY; 31	ATL; 17	LVS; 20	PHO; 37	CAL; 21	TEX; 25	BRI; 28	RCH; 10	TAL; 11	IOW; 20	CLT; 17	DOV; 22	MCH; 35	CHI	DAY; 31	KEN; 16	NHA; 23	IND; 31	IOW	GLN; 36	MOH; 18	BRI; 15	ROA	DAR; 8	RCH; 18	CHI; 32	KEN	DOV; 15	CLT; 18	KAN; 18	TEX; 22	PHO; 29	HOM; 16			18th	637	
2018	JD Motorsports	01	Chevy	DAY	ATL	LVS	PHO	CAL	TEX	BRI	RCH	TAL	DOV	CLT	POC	MCH	IOW	CHI	DAY	KEN	NHA	IOW	GLN	MOH	BRI	ROA	DAR; 14	IND				DOV; 26	KAN	TEX	PHO				48th	59	
2018	JD Motorsports	4	Chevy																										LVS; 14	RCH									48th	59	
2018	MBM Motorsports	13	Dodge																												ROV; 38								48th	59	
2018	Shepherd Racing Ventures	89	Chevy																																	HOM; 38			48th	59	
2019	JD Motorsports	4	Chevy	DAY	ATL	LVS	PHO	CAL	TEX	BRI	RCH	TAL; 9	DOV					CHI; 19	DAY; 37						BRI; 10	ROA		IND; 16											32nd	175	
2019	Shepherd Racing Ventures	89	Chevy											CLT; 34	POC	MCH; 32	IOW				NHA; 37	IOW	GLN	MOH					LVS; 36	RCH; 36	ROV	DOV; 29	KAN; 36	TEX; 36	PHO; 38	HOM; 15			32nd	175	
2019	JD Motorsports	15	Chevy																	KEN; 26																			32nd	175	
2019	JD Motorsports	01	Chevy																								DAR; 18												32nd	175	
2020	Shepherd Racing Ventures	89	Chevy	DAY	LVS; 36	CAL; 36	PHO; 35	DAR; 38	CLT	BRI	ATL; Wth	HOM	HOM	TAL	POC	IRC	KEN	KEN	TEX	KAN	ROA	DRC	DOV	DOV	DAY	DAR	RCH	RCH	BRI	LVS	TAL	ROV	KAN	TEX	MAR	PHO			69th	5	
2021	JD Motorsports	4	Chevy	DAY; 23	DRC; 12	HOM; 19	LVS; 21	PHO; 22	ATL; 14	MAR; 37	TAL; 20	DAR; 12		COA; 22				NSH; 29	POC; 21	ROA; 27	ATL; 38	NHA; 25	GLN; 20	IRC; 17	MCH; 26	DAY; 21	DAR; 16	RCH; 39	BRI; 39	LVS; 16	TAL; 37	ROV; 17	TEX; 36	KAN; 19	MAR; 12	PHO; DNQ			22nd	465	
2021	JD Motorsports	6	Chevy										DOV; 25		CLT; 13	MOH; 20	TEX; 15																						22nd	465	
2022	Kaulig Racing	10	Chevy	DAY; 14	CAL; 38	LVS; 6	PHO; 9	ATL; 5	COA; 31	RCH; 15	MAR; 2	TAL; 5	DOV; 12	DAR; 6	TEX; 10	CLT; 29	PIR; 15	NSH; 18	ROA; 32	ATL; 8	NHA; 37	POC; 11	IRC; 11	MCH; 10	GLN; 16	DAY; 23	DAR; 12	KAN; 13	BRI; 35	TEX; 33	TAL; 3	ROV; 10	LVS; 11	HOM; 12	MAR; 37	PHO; 4			13th	779	
^{†} – Qualified for Daryl Harr

==== Camping World Truck Series ====
NASCAR Camping World Truck Series results
Year	Team	No.	Make	1	2	3	4	5	6	7	8	9	10	11	12	13	14	15	16	17	18	19	20	21	22	23	24	25	NCWTC	Pts	Ref
2008	Morgan-Dollar Motorsports	46	Chevy	DAY	CAL	ATL	MAR	KAN; 13	CLT; 9	MFD; 20	DOV; 24	TEX	MCH	MLW; 3	MEM	KEN													31st	892	
2008	Randy Moss Motorsports	81	Chevy														IRP; 14	NSH	BRI	GTW	NHA	LVS	TAL; 6	MAR	ATL	TEX	PHO	HOM	31st	892	
2010	ThorSport Racing	98	Chevy	DAY; 36	ATL	MAR	NSH	KAN	DOV	CLT	TEX	MCH	IOW	GTY	IRP	POC	NSH	DAR	BRI	CHI	KEN	NHA	LVS	MAR	TAL	TEX	PHO	HOM	119th	55	

==== K&N Pro Series East ====
NASCAR K&N Pro Series East results
Year	Team	No.	Make	1	2	3	4	5	6	7	8	9	10	11	12	13	14	NKNPSEC	Pts	Ref
2007	Hendrick Motorsports	42	Chevy	GRE	ELK	IOW	SBO; 14	STA	NHA; 4	TMP	MCM	ADI	LRP	MFD	NHA	DOV		37th	281	
2015	Ranier Racing with MDM	41	Chevy	NSM	GRE	BRI	IOW	BGS	LGY	COL	NHA	IOW	GLN	MOT	VIR	RCH	DOV; 8	47th	36	

==== K&N Pro Series West ====
NASCAR K&N Pro Series West results
Year	Team	No.	Make	1	2	3	4	5	6	7	8	9	10	11	12	13	NKNPSWC	Pts	Ref
2015	Ranier Racing with MDM	41	Chevy	KCR	IRW	TUS	IOW	SHA	SON	SLS	IOW	EVG	CNS	MER	AAS	PHO; 5	43rd	39	

^{*} Season still in progress
^{1} Ineligible for series points
^{2} Cassill started the 2013 season running for Sprint Cup Series points but switched to the Nationwide Series starting at Charlotte in May.
^{3} Cassill started the 2019 season running for Cup Series points, but switched to the Xfinity Series starting at Talladega in April.

=== ARCA Re/Max Series ===
(key) (Bold – Pole position awarded by qualifying time. Italics – Pole position earned by points standings or practice time. * – Most laps led.)

ARCA Re/Max Series results
Year	Team	No.	Make	1	2	3	4	5	6	7	8	9	10	11	12	13	14	15	16	17	18	19	20	21	22	23	ARSC	Pts	Ref
2007	Hendrick Motorsports	87	Chevy	DAY	USA	NSH	SLM	KAN	WIN	KEN	TOL	IOW	POC	MCH	BLN	KEN; 38	POC; 32*	NSH	ISF	MIL	GTW	DSF	CHI	SLM	TAL; DNQ	TOL	131st	150	
2008	JR Motorsports	88	Chevy	DAY; 7	SLM	IOW	KAN	CAR	KEN	TOL	POC	MCH	CAY	KEN	BLN	POC	NSH	ISF	DSF	CHI	SLM	NJE	TAL; 39	TOL			85th	230	

Achievements
Preceded by David Ragan	NASCAR Nationwide Series Rookie of the Year; 2008	Succeeded by Justin Allgaier
