= 2015 CampingWorld.com 500 at Talladega =

Race details
- Race 32 of 36 in the 2015 NASCAR Sprint Cup Series
- Date: October 25, 2015
- Location: Talladega Superspeedway in Lincoln, Alabama
- Course: Permanent racing facility
- Course length: 2.66 miles (4.281 km)
- Distance: 196 laps, 521.36 mi (839.048 km)
- Scheduled distance: 188 laps, 500.08 mi (804.801 km)
- Average speed: 167.311 mph (269.261 km/h)

Pole position
Driver	Jeff Gordon	Hendrick Motorsports
- Time: 49.234

Most laps led
Driver	Dale Earnhardt Jr.	Hendrick Motorsports
- Laps: 61

Winner
No. 22	Joey Logano	Team Penske

Television in the United States
- Network: NBCSN
- Announcers: Rick Allen, Jeff Burton and Steve Letarte
- Nielsen ratings: 2.5/5 (Overnight); 2.6/5 (Final); 4.2 Million viewers

Radio in the United States
- Radio: MRN
- Booth announcers: Joe Moore, Jeff Striegle and Rusty Wallace
- Turn announcers: Dave Moody (1 & 2), Mike Bagley (Backstretch) and Kyle Rickey (3 & 4)

The 2015 CampingWorld.com 500 at Talladega was a NASCAR Sprint Cup Series race held on October 25, 2015, at Talladega Superspeedway in Lincoln, Alabama. Contested over 196 laps – extended from 188 laps due to a green–white–checkered finish – on the 2.66-mile (4.28-kilometre) superspeedway, it was the 32nd race of the 2015 NASCAR Sprint Cup Series season, sixth race of the Chase and final race of the Contender Round. Joey Logano won the race, his sixth of the season and third in a row, thus sweeping the entire Contender Round. Dale Earnhardt Jr. finished second, while Jeff Gordon, Brad Keselowski and Carl Edwards rounded out the top-five.

Gordon won the pole for the race and led eight laps on his way to a third-place finish. Earnhardt lead a race high of 61 laps on his way to a runner-up finish. The race had 30 lead changes among 18 different drivers, as well as three caution flag periods for 18 laps.

This was the 14th career victory for Logano, sixth of the season, third consecutive, first at Talladega Superspeedway and third at the track for Team Penske. He left Talladega with the points lead. Despite being the winning manufacturer, Ford left Talladega trailing Chevrolet by 63 points in the manufacturer standings.

The CampingWorld.com 500 at Talladega was carried by NBC Sports on the cable/satellite NBCSN network for the American television audience. The radio broadcast for the race was carried by the Motor Racing Network and Sirius XM NASCAR Radio.

== Report ==
=== Background ===
Talladega Superspeedway, the track where the race was held.

Talladega Superspeedway (Alabama International Motor Speedway from 1969 to 1989) is a 2.660 mi (4.281 km) tri-oval superspeedway in Lincoln, Alabama. Joey Logano entered with a 13-point lead over Denny Hamlin. Kurt Busch entered third 18 points back. Carl Edwards entered fourth 19 points back. Kevin Harvick, Jeff Gordon and Brad Keselowski entered tied for fifth 24 points back. Martin Truex Jr. entered eighth 25 points back. Kyle Busch entered ninth 31 points back. Ryan Newman entered 10th 33 points back. Dale Earnhardt Jr. entered 11th 56 points back. Matt Kenseth entered 12th 60 points back.

==== Race procedure adjustment ====
On Tuesday, October 20, NASCAR announced that the number of green-white-checker attempts would be reduced to just a single-attempt for the weekend's race. NASCAR Executive Vice-President and Chief Racing Development Officer Steve O'Donnell said that after "extensive dialogue with the industry, we have decided to make a procedural change at Talladega Superspeedway this weekend. In the event the race goes beyond the advertised distance due to a caution, we will use a single attempt at a green-white-checker finish. We take very seriously the responsibility of balancing exciting finishes and safety. We’re confident that this is a positive direction for both.”

==== Chase-clinching scenarios ====
The following Chase-clinching scenarios were in play for the weekend's race.

===== Regardless of who wins =====
Denny Hamlin would've clinched a spot in the Eliminator Round with a finish of 14th or better, 15th if he led a lap or 16th if he led the most laps. Kurt Busch would've clinched with a finish of eighth or better, ninth if he led a lap or 10th if he led the most laps. Carl Edwards would've clinched with a finish of seventh or better, eighth if he led a lap or ninth if he led the most laps. Kevin Harvick, Jeff Gordon and Brad Keselowski would've clinched if any of them finished second or better, third if any of them led a lap or fourth if any of them led the most laps. Martin Truex Jr. would've clinched with a finish of second or better or third if he led the most laps.

===== Must win =====
Kyle Busch, Dale Earnhardt Jr., Matt Kenseth and Ryan Newman only controlled their destinies with a win.

==== Entry list ====
The entry list for the CampingWorld.com 500 at Talladega was released on Monday, October 19 at 9:43 a.m. Eastern time. Forty-five cars were entered for the race. All but Michael McDowell were entered in the previous week's race at Kansas. There were several driver changes for this weekend's race. Bobby Labonte returned to the seat of the No. 32 Go FAS Racing Ford. Travis Kvapil returned to the seat of the No. 33 Hillman-Circle Sport LLC Chevrolet. Josh Wise drove the No. 34 Front Row Motorsports Ford. Michael Waltrip drove the No. 98 Michael Waltrip Racing Toyota.

No.	Driver	Team	Manufacturer
1	Jamie McMurray	Chip Ganassi Racing	Chevrolet
2	Brad Keselowski (PC3)	Team Penske	Ford
3	Austin Dillon	Richard Childress Racing	Chevrolet
4	Kevin Harvick (PC1)	Stewart–Haas Racing	Chevrolet
5	Kasey Kahne	Hendrick Motorsports	Chevrolet
6	Trevor Bayne	Roush Fenway Racing	Ford
7	Alex Bowman	Tommy Baldwin Racing	Chevrolet
9	Sam Hornish Jr.	Richard Petty Motorsports	Ford
10	Danica Patrick	Stewart–Haas Racing	Chevrolet
11	Denny Hamlin	Joe Gibbs Racing	Toyota
13	Casey Mears	Germain Racing	Chevrolet
14	Tony Stewart (PC4)	Stewart–Haas Racing	Chevrolet
15	Clint Bowyer	Michael Waltrip Racing	Toyota
16	Greg Biffle	Roush Fenway Racing	Ford
17	Ricky Stenhouse Jr.	Roush Fenway Racing	Ford
18	Kyle Busch	Joe Gibbs Racing	Toyota
19	Carl Edwards	Joe Gibbs Racing	Toyota
20	Matt Kenseth (PC6)	Joe Gibbs Racing	Toyota
21	Ryan Blaney (i)	Wood Brothers Racing	Ford
22	Joey Logano	Team Penske	Ford
23	Jeb Burton (R)	BK Racing	Toyota
24	Jeff Gordon (PC7)	Hendrick Motorsports	Chevrolet
26	J. J. Yeley (i)	BK Racing	Toyota
27	Paul Menard	Richard Childress Racing	Chevrolet
31	Ryan Newman	Richard Childress Racing	Chevrolet
32	Bobby Labonte (PC8)	Go FAS Racing	Ford
33	Travis Kvapil (i)	Hillman-Circle Sport LLC	Chevrolet
34	Josh Wise	Front Row Motorsports	Ford
35	Cole Whitt	Front Row Motorsports	Ford
38	David Gilliland	Front Row Motorsports	Ford
40	Landon Cassill (i)	Hillman-Circle Sport LLC	Chevrolet
41	Kurt Busch (PC5)	Stewart–Haas Racing	Chevrolet
42	Kyle Larson	Chip Ganassi Racing	Chevrolet
43	Aric Almirola	Richard Petty Motorsports	Ford
46	Michael Annett	HScott Motorsports	Chevrolet
47	A. J. Allmendinger	JTG Daugherty Racing	Chevrolet
48	Jimmie Johnson (PC2)	Hendrick Motorsports	Chevrolet
51	Justin Allgaier	HScott Motorsports	Chevrolet
55	David Ragan	Michael Waltrip Racing	Toyota
62	Timmy Hill (i)	Premium Motorsports	Chevrolet
78	Martin Truex Jr.	Furniture Row Racing	Chevrolet
83	Matt DiBenedetto (R)	BK Racing	Toyota
88	Dale Earnhardt Jr.	Hendrick Motorsports	Chevrolet
95	Michael McDowell	Leavine Family Racing	Ford
98	Michael Waltrip	Michael Waltrip Racing	Toyota
Official entry list

Key	Meaning
(R)	Rookie
(i)	Ineligible for points
(PC#)	Past champions provisional

== Practice ==
=== First practice ===
Greg Biffle was the fastest in the first practice session with a time of 47.597 and a speed of 201.189 mph (323.782 km/h).

Pos	No.	Driver	Team	Manufacturer	Time	Speed
1	16	Greg Biffle	Roush Fenway Racing	Ford	47.597	201.189
2	10	Danica Patrick	Stewart–Haas Racing	Chevrolet	47.731	200.624
3	51	Justin Allgaier	HScott Motorsports	Chevrolet	47.743	200.574
Official first practice results

=== Final practice ===
Brad Keselowski was the fastest in the final practice with a time of 48.752 and a speed of 196.423 mph (316.112 km/h).

Pos	No.	Driver	Team	Manufacturer	Time	Speed
1	2	Brad Keselowski	Team Penske	Ford	48.752	196.423
2	21	Ryan Blaney (i)	Wood Brothers Racing	Ford	48.772	196.342
3	88	Dale Earnhardt Jr.	Hendrick Motorsports	Chevrolet	49.178	194.721
Official final practice results

== Qualifying ==
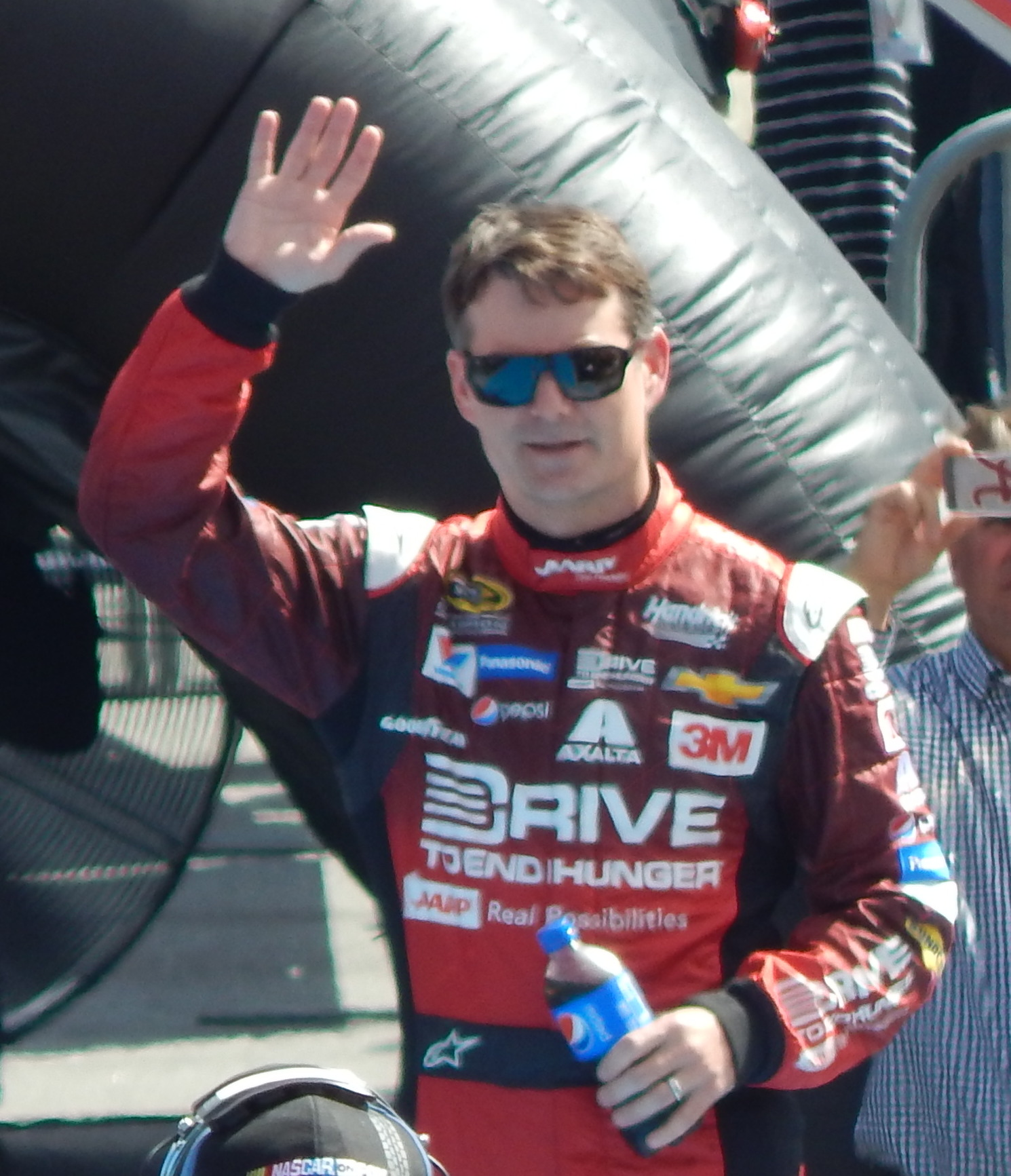
Jeff Gordon, seen here at the 2015 Daytona 500, won the pole for the race.

Jeff Gordon won the pole with a time of 49.234 and a speed of 194.500 mph (313.017 km/h). Gordon said he knew he "had a fast car, but I wasn’t sure. This is a different car than what we had here earlier this year. I mean everybody felt confident in the car and it was really fast in the drafting sessions, but we weren’t exactly sure when we made a mock qualifying run if we had what it took for the pole, but after that first run I knew the boys did what they do." Dale Earnhardt Jr. said that his teammates "had a little more speed, but we feel like our car is going to race really well and just ready to go,” Martin Truex Jr.'s time was disallowed after he went below the yellow line during his qualifying laps, which is forbidden on superspeedways. Justin Allgaier started from the rear after his car was damaged on pit road during qualifying. Michael Annett and Jeb Burton failed to make the race.

=== Qualifying results ===
Pos	No.	Driver	Team	Manufacturer	R1	R2
1	24	Jeff Gordon	Hendrick Motorsports	Chevrolet	49.296	49.234
2	5	Kasey Kahne	Hendrick Motorsports	Chevrolet	49.348	49.453
3	48	Jimmie Johnson	Hendrick Motorsports	Chevrolet	49.506	49.467
4	20	Matt Kenseth	Joe Gibbs Racing	Toyota	49.506	49.468
5	88	Dale Earnhardt Jr.	Hendrick Motorsports	Chevrolet	49.516	49.575
6	6	Trevor Bayne	Roush Fenway Racing	Ford	49.717	49.674
7	4	Kevin Harvick	Stewart–Haas Racing	Chevrolet	49.712	49.720
8	11	Denny Hamlin	Joe Gibbs Racing	Toyota	49.658	49.737
9	21	Ryan Blaney (i)	Wood Brothers Racing	Ford	49.545	49.743
10	22	Joey Logano	Team Penske	Ford	49.586	49.746
11	2	Brad Keselowski	Team Penske	Ford	49.565	49.820
12	14	Tony Stewart	Stewart–Haas Racing	Chevrolet	49.731	49.845
13	27	Paul Menard	Richard Childress Racing	Chevrolet	49.749	—
14	41	Kurt Busch	Stewart–Haas Racing	Chevrolet	49.792	—
15	19	Carl Edwards	Joe Gibbs Racing	Toyota	49.792	—
16	18	Kyle Busch	Joe Gibbs Racing	Toyota	49.824	—
17	17	Ricky Stenhouse Jr.	Roush Fenway Racing	Ford	49.880	—
18	31	Ryan Newman	Richard Childress Racing	Chevrolet	49.891	—
19	16	Greg Biffle	Roush Fenway Racing	Ford	49.915	—
20	10	Danica Patrick	Stewart–Haas Racing	Chevrolet	49.924	—
21	9	Sam Hornish Jr.	Richard Petty Motorsports	Ford	49.940	—
22	55	David Ragan	Michael Waltrip Racing	Toyota	49.943	—
23	42	Kyle Larson	Chip Ganassi Racing	Chevrolet	49.946	—
24	1	Jamie McMurray	Chip Ganassi Racing	Chevrolet	49.981	—
25	43	Aric Almirola	Richard Petty Motorsports	Ford	50.002	—
26	3	Austin Dillon	Richard Childress Racing	Chevrolet	50.009	—
27	95	Michael McDowell	Leavine Family Racing	Ford	50.077	—
28	13	Casey Mears	Germain Racing	Chevrolet	50.095	—
29	15	Clint Bowyer	Michael Waltrip Racing	Toyota	50.109	—
30	26	J. J. Yeley (i)	BK Racing	Toyota	50.146	—
31	47	A. J. Allmendinger	JTG Daugherty Racing	Chevrolet	50.179	—
32	62	Timmy Hill (i)	Premium Motorsports	Chevrolet	50.246	—
33	98	Michael Waltrip	Michael Waltrip Racing	Toyota	50.338	—
34	35	Cole Whitt	Front Row Motorsports	Ford	50.358	—
35	32	Bobby Labonte	Go FAS Racing	Ford	50.449	—
36	83	Matt DiBenedetto (R)	BK Racing	Toyota	50.528	—
37	7	Alex Bowman	Tommy Baldwin Racing	Chevrolet	50.549	—
38	38	David Gilliland	Front Row Motorsports	Ford	50.570	—
39	51	Justin Allgaier	HScott Motorsports	Chevrolet	50.631	—
40	34	Josh Wise	Front Row Motorsports	Ford	50.744	—
41	40	Landon Cassill (i)	Hillman-Circle Sport LLC	Chevrolet	50.885	—
42	33	Travis Kvapil (i)	Hillman-Circle Sport LLC	Chevrolet	50.889	—
43	78	Martin Truex Jr.	Furniture Row Racing	Chevrolet	0.000	—
Failed to qualify
44	23	Jeb Burton (R)	BK Racing	Toyota	50.765	—
45	46	Michael Annett	HScott Motorsports	Chevrolet	50.828	—
Official qualifying results

== Race ==
=== Start ===
==== First half ====
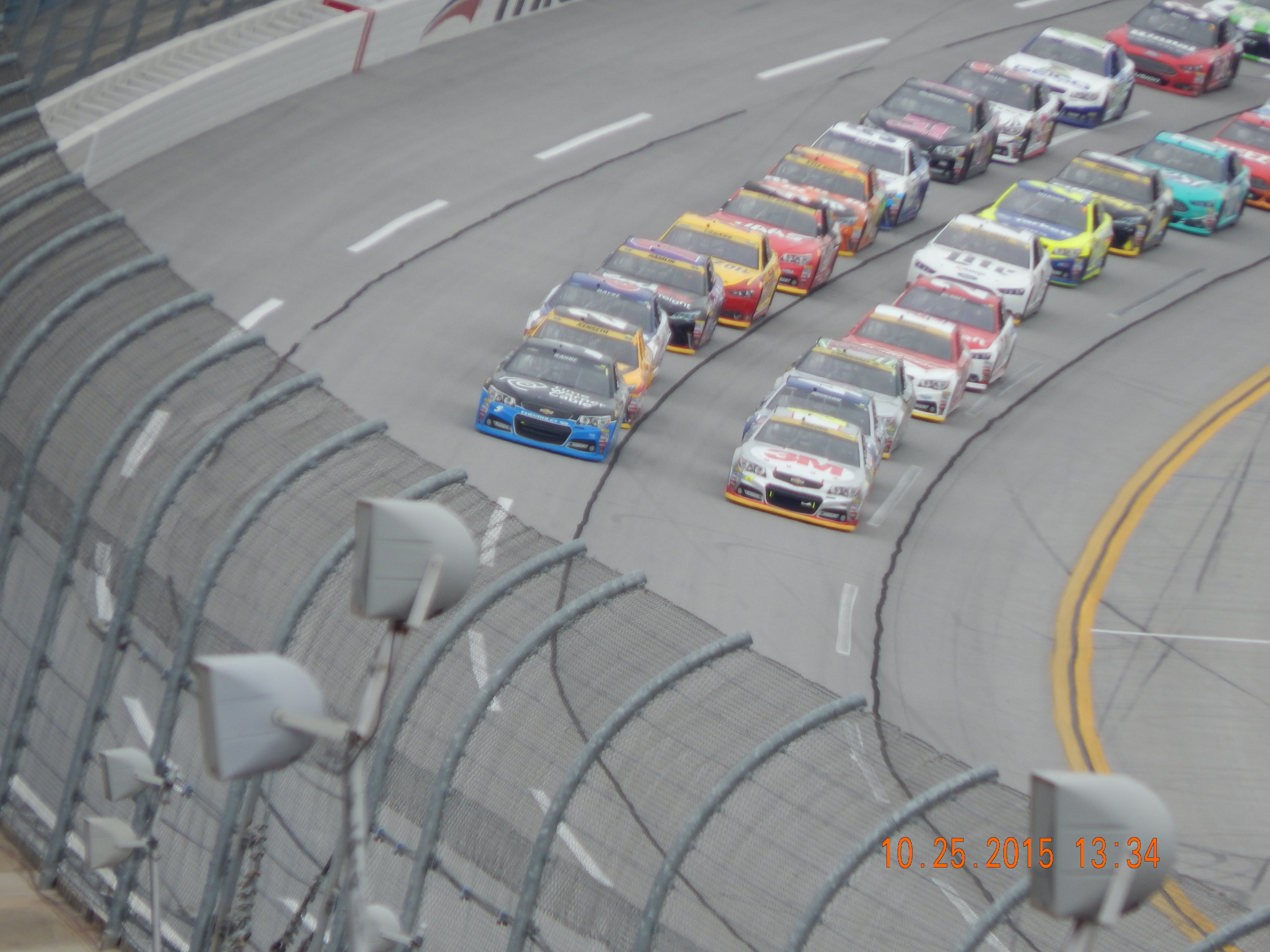
Jeff Gordon leads the field to the green flag at Talladega Superspeedway.

Under overcast Alabama skies, Jeff Gordon led the field to the green flag at 2:34 p.m. Eastern time. He would lead the first nine laps before Dale Earnhardt Jr. used the middle line to drive by him and take the lead on lap 10. Denny Hamlin used a push on the top line to take the lead on lap 12. Earnhardt used the bottom line to pass and jump in front of him to take the lead on lap 16. Hamlin used the middle line to retake the lead on lap 17. Earnhardt hugged the yellow line and took the lead on lap 18. Gordon rode the middle line to retake the lead on lap 19. Earnhardt powered ahead on the bottom to take back the lead on lap 20. Five laps later, the first seven cars broke away from the rest of the pack. When Trevor Bayne caught his bumper, Matt Kenseth broke out of line and drove past teammate Hamlin. He, however, was shuffled out of line and fell back towards the middle of the pack. Green flag pit stops began on lap 38. Earnhardt hit pit road on lap 40 and handed the lead to Michael Waltrip. He pitted the next lap and the lead cycled to Jimmie Johnson. Austin Dillon was tagged for a tire violation and was forced to serve a drive-through penalty. Aric Almirola was tagged for speeding on pit road and was forced to serve a drive-through penalty.

==== Second quarter ====
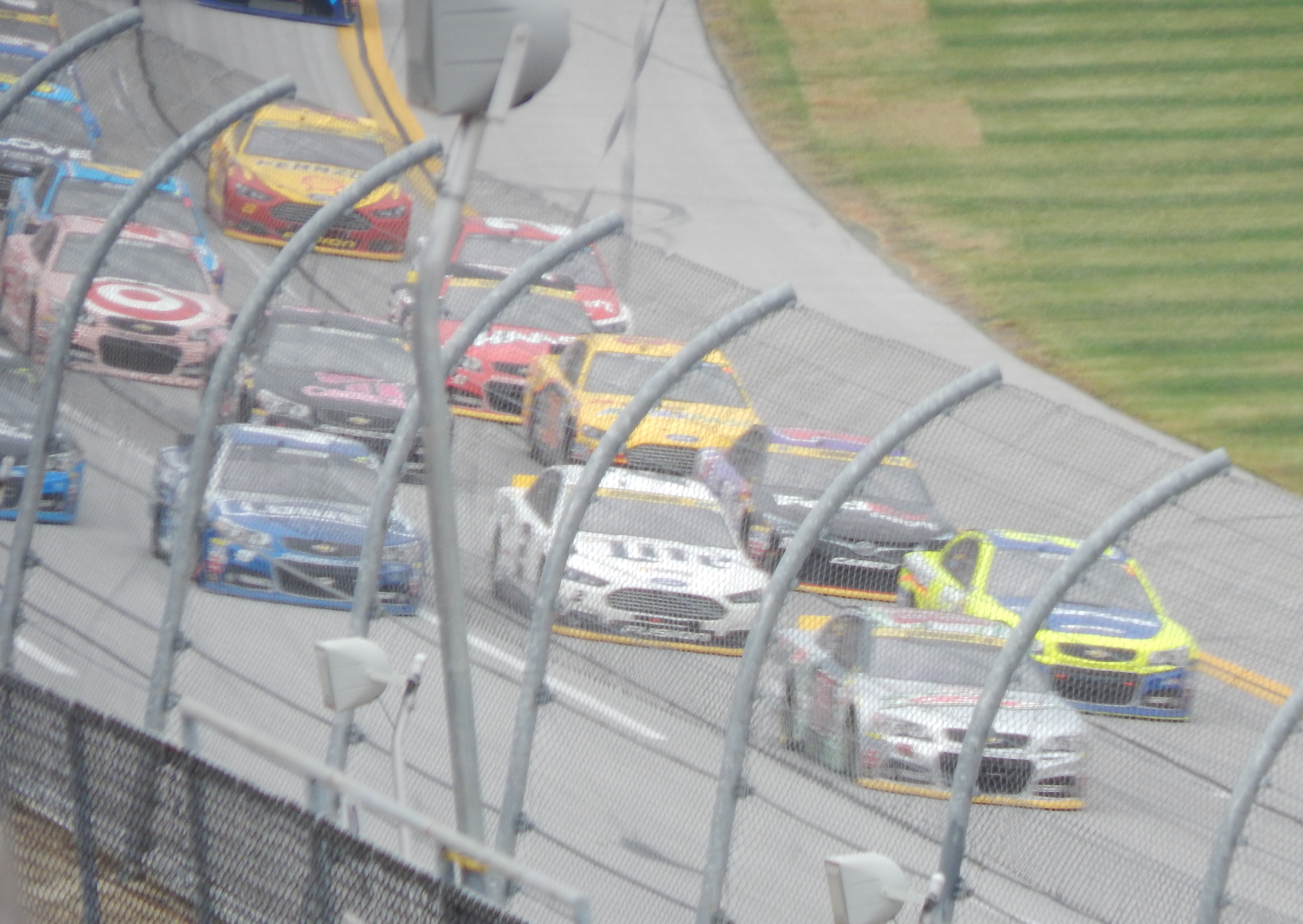
Dale Earnhardt Jr. leads at lap 71 at Talladega.

For the next 20 laps, the No. 48 Chevrolet headed the field in a single-file line riding around the top lane of Talladega. By lap 56, he had two big pieces of paper on the grill of his car that caused some concern. Dale Earnhardt Jr. used the bottom line to retake the lead on lap 65. The second round of green flag stops began on lap 78. Earnhardt ducked onto pit road on lap 80 and handed the lead to Michael Waltrip. He pitted the next lap and handed the lead to David Ragan. He pitted the next lap and the lead cycled to Paul Menard. Michael McDowell was tagged for speeding on pit road and was forced to serve a drive-through penalty. Travis Kvapil was tagged for his crew being over the wall too soon and was forced to serve a drive-through penalty. Joey Logano passed to the outside of Menard at the start/finish line to take the lead on lap 84. The escape roof hatch on Denny Hamlin's car came loose on lap 84 and he was forced to make an unscheduled stop to tape down the hatch. After five laps of running behind the No. 33 car, it began to come up again.

=== Second half ===
==== Halfway ====
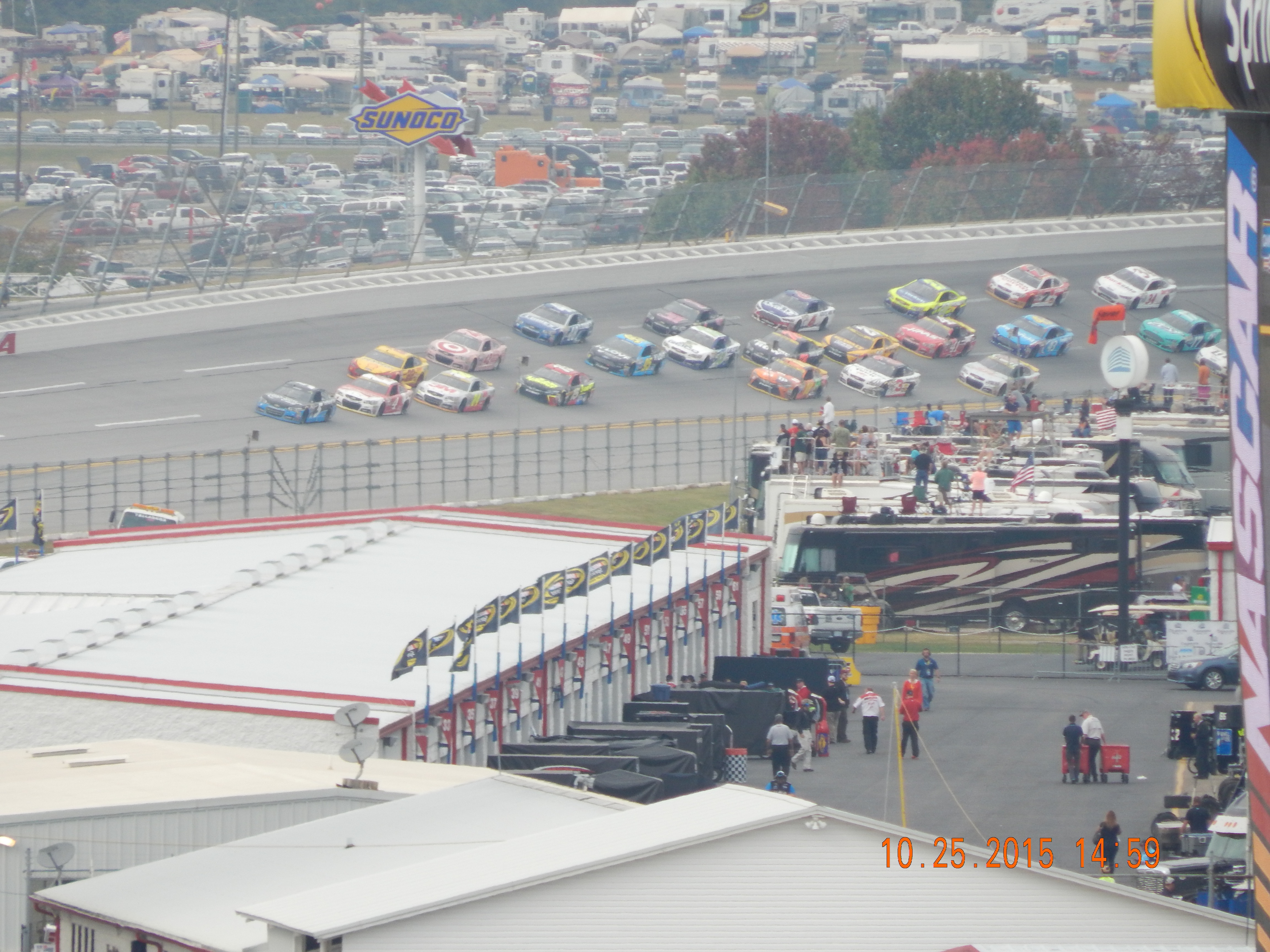
Kasey Kahne leads at Talladega.

Clint Bowyer used the outside line to pass for the lead on lap 96. Kevin Harvick used a push from the middle line to take the lead on lap 98. Kasey Kahne used the bottom line to take the lead on lap 102. Casey Mears couldn't get his car slowed down enough while pitting and ran through the tri-oval grass on lap 118. Kahne hit pit road the next lap and handed the lead to Ricky Stenhouse Jr. The lead cycled to Dale Earnhardt Jr. Unfortunately, he was tagged for his crew being over the wall too soon and was forced to serve a drive-through penalty. The lead then went to teammate Jimmie Johnson. Justin Allgaier was tagged for his crew being over the wall too soon and was forced to serve a drive-through penalty.

Earnhardt was saved from going a lap down when the first caution of the race flew with 57 laps to go after Allgaier's engine let go exiting turn 2. Ryan Newman opted not to pit and assumed the lead. He pitted the next lap and handed the lead to Kurt Busch. He pitted the next lap and gave the lead to David Gilliland. He pitted the next lap and the lead cycled to Matt Kenseth.

==== Fourth quarter ====
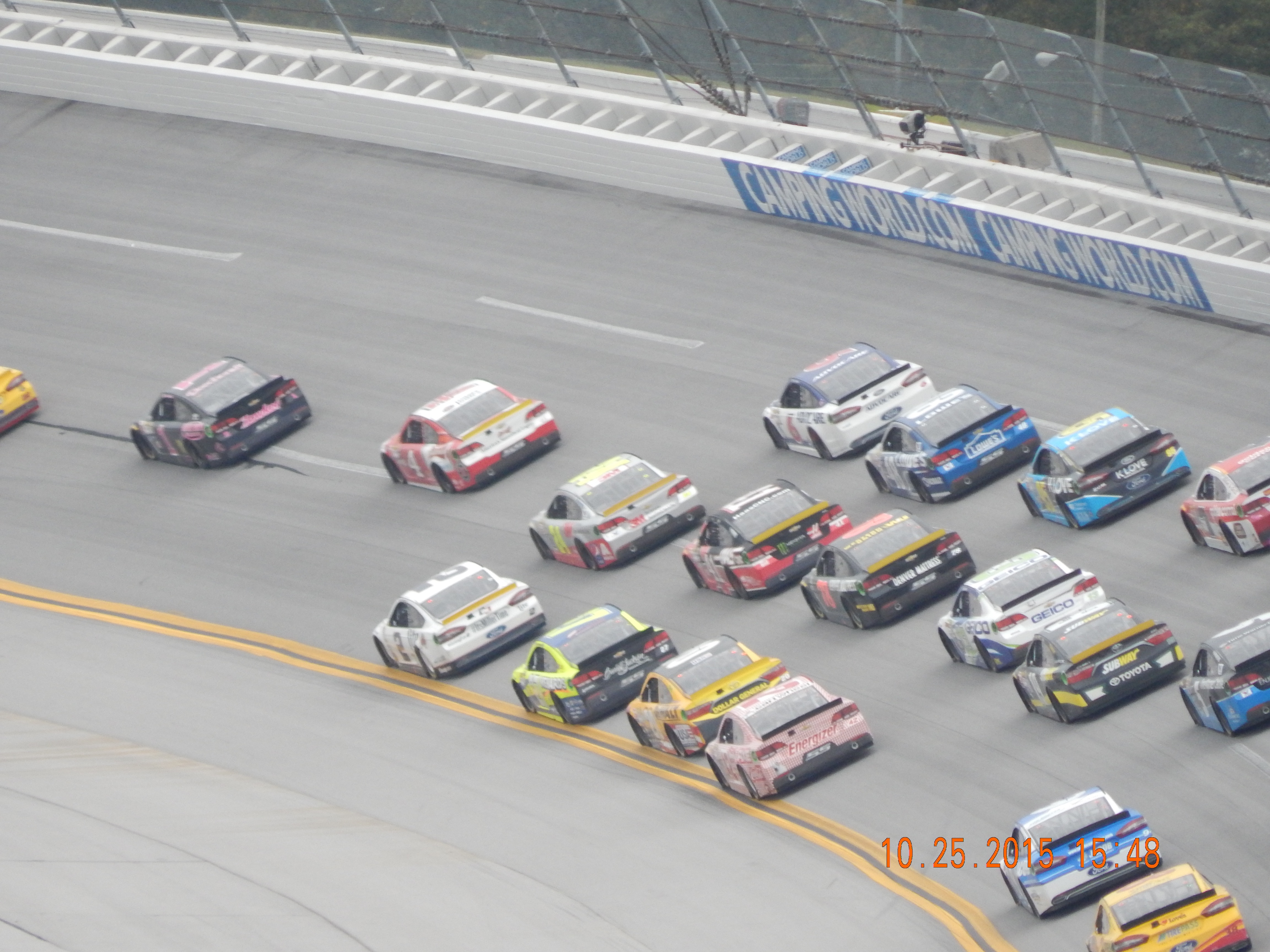
The field makes their way through turn 1 at Talladega in the closing stages of the race.

The race restarted with 49 laps to go. Kyle Busch jumped ahead of his teammate to take the lead with 48 laps to go. Dale Earnhardt Jr. dove underneath Kyle Busch on the backstretch to retake the lead with 37 laps to go. A few cars began making their final stop with 20 laps to go. Earnhardt hit pit road with 19 laps to go and handed the lead to Paul Menard. He pitted the next lap and handed the lead to David Gilliland. He pitted the next laps and the lead cycled to Greg Biffle who was on a different pit cycle.

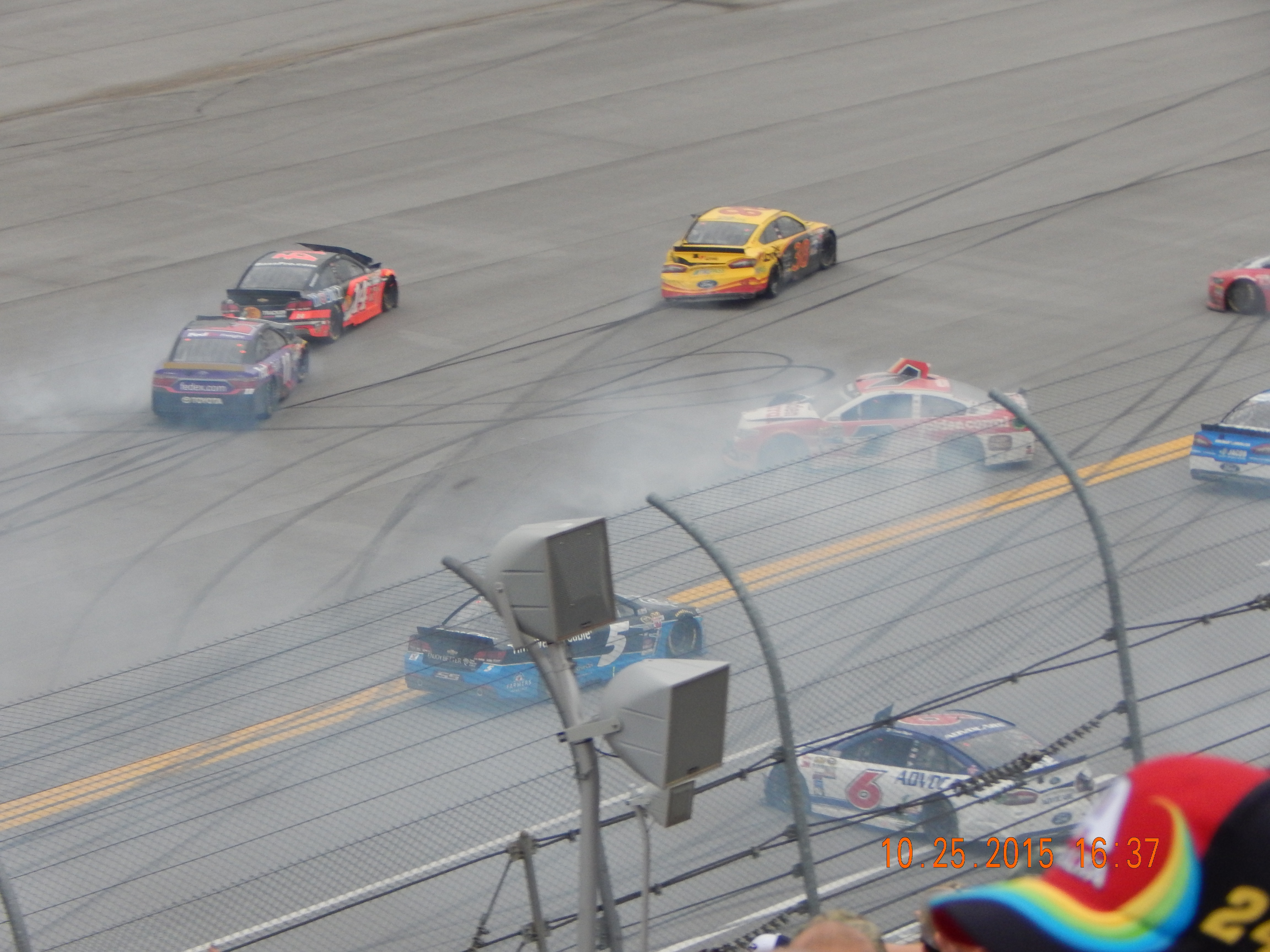
The Big One happens on the final lap.

As the field began to bunch up in the closing 15 laps, Biffle enjoyed a lead of nearly a full lap ahead of Joey Logano. The lead was so great, in fact, that he caught the tail-end of the lead pack of cars. With 10 laps to go, Earnhardt and a number of other cars broke the single-file train and began making his move towards the front of the line. The next two laps saw the line go from single to double and even triple-file. Unfortunately for Biffle, Jamie McMurray's engine let go on the backstretch and brought out the second caution of the race with five laps to go.

===== Finish =====
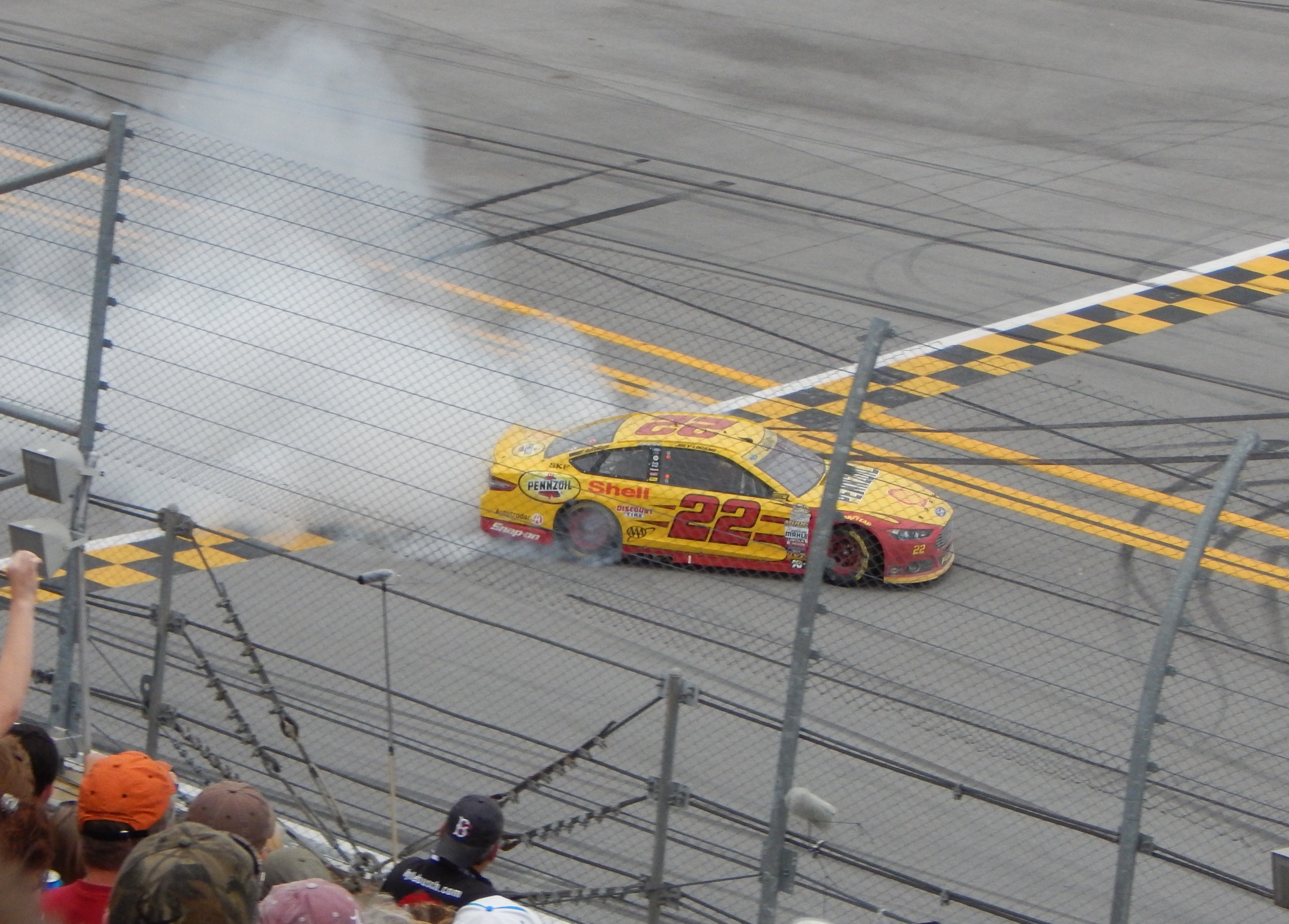
Joey Logano celebrates his third-consecutive win.

The race restarted with two laps to go at a scheduled Green-white-checker finish though a first attempt at a restart failed when Jimmie Johnson spun out after being tagged from behind by Kyle Larson. On the second attempt, the third caution of the race flew for a huge crash exiting pit road. That happened as Kevin Harvick's car was unable to accelerate when the green flag was waived (he had developed the problem before the first attempt, where he had moved out of the way with considerable room before the line and was not involved in the failed restart) and collided with Trevor Bayne before the start line. A total of ten cars were involved in the melee, Denny Hamlin, Michael McDowell, Tony Stewart, Matt Kenseth, David Gilliland, Kevin Harvick, Danica Patrick, Sam Hornish Jr., Trevor Bayne and Austin Dillon.

NASCAR decided Logano was ahead of Earnhardt when the caution came out and scored his sixth race of the season and first at Talladega. During the burnout celebration, fans hurled debris including beer cans at Logano as a protest to the green-white checkered rule and the fact that the yellow flag was immediately displayed when the crash occurred and not letting the cars race back to the finish line. While at victory lane and during the interview, the crowd booed Logano loudly. The crowd reaction was similar to the 2004 Spring race (won by Jeff Gordon). In both, Earnhardt Jr was ahead, but was second when at the time line before the caution, as the time line decides races.

== Post-race ==
=== Driver comments ===
Following the race, Logano said that his team was "going on all eight right now. It's amazing — all these different types of racetracks we've been able to win at this season and how hard everyone keeps fighting. We want the big trophy at the end of the year. We want to win every trophy in between, but we want the big one at the end of the season. What we've shown in this latest round is a big deal, but the fact of the matter is that we're back to zero again. What we do have going for us that other teams don"t have is a lot of confidence. We've got momentum, and we're relaxed. We've shown that we know how to do it. We've just got to keep going out there and do what we know how to do."

Dale Earnhardt Jr. said after the race that if they went another 100 yards, he would've "been in the lead, but NASCAR makes the calls. They are the governing body, and I have 100 percent faith in the choices that they make. I'm not going to be too upset about it. I did everything I could. I'm proud of myself. I'm proud of my team. We can sit here and pout about this day, but we didn't do good enough in the first two races of this round," he said. "If we had done better in those first two races of this round, we would not be worried about losing by a splitter. We didn't do a good job in those first two races. We've got to try to win another race before the year is out, have some fun."

Following a third–place finish in his final restrictor plate race, Jeff Gordon said that it was "intense. That was wild. That was crazy. I hate it that I didn't have Dale Jr. in front of me on that last restart. I got kind of excited about pushing him there at the end and get both him and me in the next round. That was pretty smart of the Penske guys to split themselves up. It is unfortunate that we had those two wrecks on those restarts. The restarts are so crucial. Everybody is trying to get all that they can and banging one another. I loved my race car today. My 3M Chevrolet was awesome. I would have loved to have a shot at them there and finish this thing out.”

Several drivers had expressed criticisms over Kevin Harvick during the final restart attempt including Trevor Bayne who've accused Harvick of deliberately wrecking him in order to secure his position for the Elimination 8 Round. "I timed the restart and got to his bumper and when I realized there was no chance he was going to go, I pulled to the high side, he was still in line, I got to his door, he started coming up, I went all the way out, and then he just hooked us. After first it was like, 'How did that just happen?' At first I didn't know if somebody had piled into the back of him and run him up into me, or what had happened. But then after going back and watching, it wasn't that complicated" said Bayne in an interview with Fox Sports prior to the race at Martinsville Speedway. Harvick responded "I was just trying to get out of the way once I got going there. I thought I could get going better than I did the first time and I just didn't get going. So as I was pulling up, I was looking to the inside waiting for them to shoot the gap and I hit the 6. Crew Chief Rodney Childers indicated that the motor on Harvick's car was blowing up. NASCAR did not sanction Harvick for the incident and kept his spot in the next round of the Chase, although NASCAR did change overtime rules for the following season by allowing for infinite overtime attempts.

== Race results ==
Pos	No.	Driver	Team	Manufacturer	Laps	Points
1	22	Joey Logano	Team Penske	Ford	196	47
2	88	Dale Earnhardt Jr.	Hendrick Motorsports	Chevrolet	196	44
3	24	Jeff Gordon	Hendrick Motorsports	Chevrolet	196	42
4	2	Brad Keselowski	Team Penske	Ford	196	40
5	19	Carl Edwards	Joe Gibbs Racing	Toyota	196	39
6	27	Paul Menard	Richard Childress Racing	Chevrolet	196	39
7	78	Martin Truex Jr.	Furniture Row Racing	Chevrolet	196	37
8	15	Clint Bowyer	Michael Waltrip Racing	Toyota	196	37
9	17	Ricky Stenhouse Jr.	Roush Fenway Racing	Ford	196	36
10	41	Kurt Busch	Stewart–Haas Racing	Chevrolet	196	35
11	18	Kyle Busch	Joe Gibbs Racing	Toyota	196	34
12	31	Ryan Newman	Richard Childress Racing	Chevrolet	196	33
13	98	Michael Waltrip	Michael Waltrip Racing	Toyota	196	32
14	3	Austin Dillon	Richard Childress Racing	Chevrolet	196	30
15	4	Kevin Harvick	Stewart–Haas Racing	Chevrolet	196	30
16	43	Aric Almirola	Richard Petty Motorsports	Ford	196	28
17	9	Sam Hornish Jr.	Richard Petty Motorsports	Ford	196	27
18	48	Jimmie Johnson	Hendrick Motorsports	Chevrolet	196	27
19	5	Kasey Kahne	Hendrick Motorsports	Chevrolet	196	26
20	16	Greg Biffle	Roush Fenway Racing	Ford	196	25
21	6	Trevor Bayne	Roush Fenway Racing	Ford	196	23
22	35	Cole Whitt	Front Row Motorsports	Ford	196	22
23	32	Bobby Labonte	Go FAS Racing	Ford	196	21
24	42	Kyle Larson	Chip Ganassi Racing	Chevrolet	196	20
25	14	Tony Stewart	Stewart–Haas Racing	Chevrolet	196	47
26	20	Matt Kenseth	Joe Gibbs Racing	Toyota	196	19
27	10	Danica Patrick	Stewart–Haas Racing	Chevrolet	196	17
28	95	Michael McDowell	Leavine Family Racing	Ford	195	16
29	34	Josh Wise	Front Row Motorsports	Ford	195	15
30	55	David Ragan	Michael Waltrip Racing	Toyota	195	15
31	13	Casey Mears	Germain Racing	Chevrolet	195	13
32	38	David Gilliland	Front Row Motorsports	Ford	194	13
33	7	Alex Bowman	Tommy Baldwin Racing	Chevrolet	194	11
34	40	Landon Cassill (i)	Hillman-Circle Sport LLC	Chevrolet	194	0
35	33	Travis Kvapil (i)	Hillman-Circle Sport LLC	Chevrolet	193	0
36	47	A. J. Allmendinger	JTG Daugherty Racing	Chevrolet	193	8
37	11	Denny Hamlin	Joe Gibbs Racing	Toyota	192	8
38	26	J. J. Yeley (i)	BK Racing	Toyota	192	0
39	1	Jamie McMurray	Chip Ganassi Racing	Chevrolet	182	5
40	83	Matt DiBenedetto (R)	BK Racing	Toyota	177	4
41	62	Timmy Hill (i)	Premium Motorsports	Chevrolet	168	3
42	51	Justin Allgaier	HScott Motorsports	Chevrolet	130	2
43	21	Ryan Blaney (i)	Wood Brothers Racing	Ford	84	0

=== Race statistics ===
- 30 lead changes among 18 different drivers
- 3 cautions for 18 laps
- Time of race: 3 hours, 6 minutes, 56 seconds
- Average speed: 167.311 mph (269.261 km/h)
- Joey Logano took home $289,573 in winnings

Lap Leaders
Laps	Leader
1-7	Jeff Gordon
8-10	Dale Earnhardt Jr.
11-14	Denny Hamlin
15	Dale Earnhardt Jr.
16	Denny Hamlin
17	Dale Earnhardt Jr.
18	Jeff Gordon
19-39	Dale Earnhardt Jr.
40-41	Michael Waltrip
42-63	Jimmie Johnson
64-79	Dale Earnhardt Jr.
80	Michael Waltrip
81	David Ragan
82	Paul Menard
83-94	Joey Logano
95-96	Clint Bowyer
97-100	Kevin Harvick
101-118	Kasey Kahne
119-120	Ricky Stenhouse Jr.
121	Greg Biffle
122-133	Jimmie Johnson
134	Ryan Newman
135	Kurt Busch
136	David Gilliland
137-139	Matt Kenseth
140-150	Kyle Busch
151-169	Dale Earnhardt Jr.
170	Paul Menard
171	David Gilliland
172-188	Greg Biffle
189-196	Joey Logano

Total laps led
Leader	Laps
Dale Earnhardt Jr.	61
Jimmie Johnson	34
Joey Logano	20
Kasey Kahne	18
Greg Biffle	18
Kyle Busch	11
Jeff Gordon	8
Denny Hamlin	5
Kevin Harvick	4
Michael Waltrip	3
Matt Kenseth	3
Paul Menard	2
Clint Bowyer	2
Ricky Stenhouse Jr.	2
David Gilliland	2
Kurt Busch	1
Ryan Newman	1
David Ragan	1

==== Race awards ====
- Coors Light Pole Award: Jeff Gordon (49.234, 194.500 mph (313.017 km/h)
- 3M Lap Leader: Dale Earnhardt Jr. (61 laps)
- American Ethanol Green Flag Restart Award: Aric Almirola
- Duralast Brakes "Bake In The Race" Award: Jimmie Johnson
- Freescale "Wide Open": Joey Logano
- Ingersoll Rand Power Move: Aric Almirola (14 positions)
- MAHLE Clevite Engine Builder of the Race: Hendrick Engines, #88
- Mobil 1 Driver of the Race: Dale Earnhardt Jr. (114.0 driver rating)
- Moog Steering and Suspension Problem Solver of The Race: Paul Menard (crew chief Justin Alexander (0.000 seconds))
- NASCAR Sprint Cup Leader Bonus: Joey Logano, ($10,000)
- Sherwin-Williams Fastest Lap: Ricky Stenhouse Jr. (Lap 87, 46.927, 204.062 mph (328.406 km/h))
- Sunoco Rookie of The Race: Matt DiBenedetto

== Media ==
=== Television ===
NBCSN will cover the race on the television side. Rick Allen, Jeff Burton and Steve Letarte will have the call in the booth for the race. Dave Burns, Mike Massaro, Marty Snider and Kelli Stavast will handle pit road on the television side.

NBCSN
Booth announcers	Pit reporters
Lap-by-lap: Rick Allen; Color-commentator: Jeff Burton; Color-commentator: Steve Letarte	Dave Burns; Mike Massaro; Marty Snider; Kelli Stavast

=== Radio ===
MRN will have the radio call for the race, which will be simulcast on Sirius XM NASCAR Radio. Joe Moore, Jeff Striegle and Rusty Wallace will call the race from the booth when the field is racing through the tri-oval. Dave Moody will call the race from the Sunoco tower outside turn 2 when the field is racing through turns 1 and 2. Mike Bagley will call the race from a platform on the inside of the track when the field is racing through down the backstretch. Kyle Rickey will call the race from the Sunoco tower outside turn 4 when the field is racing through turns 3 and 4. Alex Hayden, Winston Kelley and Steve Post will handle pit road on the radio side.

MRN
Booth announcers	Turn announcers	Pit reporters
Lead announcer: Joe Moore; Announcer: Jeff Striegle; Announcer: Rusty Wallace	Turns 1 & 2: Dave Moody; Backstretch: Mike Bagley; Turns 3 & 4: Kyle Rickey	Alex Hayden; Winston Kelley; Steve Post

== Standings after the race ==
Drivers' Championship standings

	Pos	Driver	Points
	1	Joey Logano	4,000
2	2	Carl Edwards	4,000 (–0)
3	3	Jeff Gordon	4,000 (–0)
1	4	Kurt Busch	4,000 (–0)
2	5	Brad Keselowski	4,000 (–0)
2	6	Martin Truex Jr.	4,000 (–0)
2	7	Kevin Harvick	4,000 (–0)
1	8	Kyle Busch	4,000 (–0)
7	9	Denny Hamlin	2,209 (–1,791)
	10	Ryan Newman	2,194 (–1,806)
	11	Matt Kenseth	2,191 (–1,809)
	12	Dale Earnhardt Jr.	2,181 (–1,819)
1	13	Jimmie Johnson	2,161 (–1,839)
1	14	Jamie McMurray	2,159 (–1,841)
	15	Paul Menard	2,148 (–1,852)
	16	Clint Bowyer	2,123 (–1,877)

Manufacturers' Championship standings

	Pos	Manufacturer	Points
	1	Chevrolet	1,401
1	2	Toyota	1,349 (–52)
1	3	Ford	1,342 (–59)

- Note: Only the first sixteen positions are included for the driver standings.

Previous race: 2015 Hollywood Casino 400	Sprint Cup Series; 2015 season	Next race: 2015 Goody's Headache Relief Shot 500
