= Cecil, Georgia =

- Town
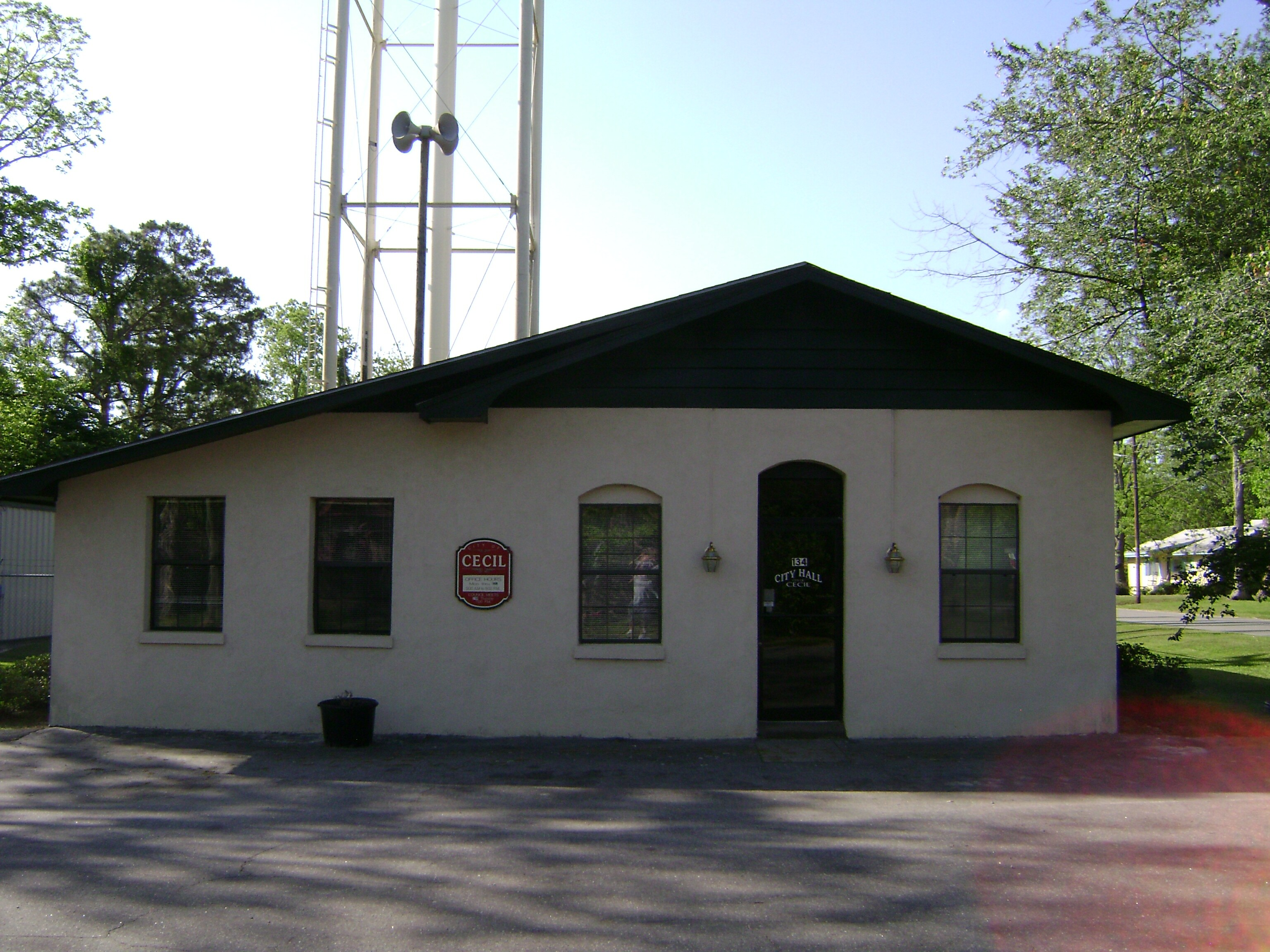
- Cecil City Hall

- Location in Cook County and the state of Georgia
- Coordinates: 31°2′50″N 83°23′36″W
- Country: United States
- State: Georgia
- County: Cook

Area
  - Total: 0.97 sq mi (2.52 km^{2})
  - Land: 0.95 sq mi (2.47 km^{2})
  - Water: 0.019 sq mi (0.05 km^{2})
- Elevation: 240 ft (73 m)

Population (2020)
  - Total: 284
  - Density: 297.2/sq mi (114.76/km^{2})
- Time zone: UTC-5 (Eastern (EST))
  - Summer (DST): UTC-4 (EDT)
- ZIP code: 31627
- Area code: 229
- FIPS code: 13-14192
- GNIS feature ID: 0331347
- Website: https://www.cityofcecil.com/

Cecil is a town in Cook County, Georgia, United States. The population was 286 at the 2010 census and 284 in 2020.

== History ==
A post office called Cecil was established in 1888. The Georgia General Assembly incorporated Cecil as a town in 1890.

== Geography ==
Cecil is located at 31°2′50″N 83°23′36″W (31.047092, -83.393416).

According to the United States Census Bureau, the town has a total area of 0.9 sq mi (2.3 km^{2}), of which 0.9 sq mi (2.3 km^{2}) is land and 1.18% is water.

== Demographics ==
Historical population
Census	Pop.	Note	%±
1890	203		—
1900	394		94.1%
1910	354		−10.2%
1920	307		−13.3%
1930	275		−10.4%
1940	215		−21.8%
1950	254		18.1%
1960	279		9.8%
1970	265		−5.0%
1980	280		5.7%
1990	376		34.3%
2000	265		−29.5%
2010	286		7.9%
2020	284		−0.7%
U.S. Decennial Census; 1850-1870 1870-1880; 1890-1910 1920-1930; 1940 1950 1960; 1970 1980 1990; 2000 2010

Cecil racial composition as of 2020
Race	Num.	Perc.
White (non-Hispanic)	179	63.03%
Black or African American (non-Hispanic)	88	30.99%
Native American	1	0.35%
Asian	2	0.7%
Other/Mixed	6	2.11%
Hispanic or Latino	8	2.82%

As of the 2020 United States census, there were 284 people, 128 households, and 82 families residing in the city.

== Arts and culture ==
South Georgia Motorsports Park, a racing venue, is located near Cecil.

The town offers rustic accommodations at the Cecil Bay RV Park.
