= South Georgia Motorsports Park =

Dragstrip near Cecil, Georgia

- Location: Adel, Georgia, United States
- Coordinates: 31°03′53″N 83°23′47″W
- Owner: Raul and Jennifer Torres
- Address: 2521 US-41
- Opened: 2004
- Major events: NHRA Mission Foods Drag Racing Series; NHRA Southern Nationals (2026-)
- Website: www.goracesgmp.com

Drag Strip
- Surface: Concrete
- Length: 0.250 mi (0.402 km)

1/2 mile oval
- Surface: Asphalt
- Length: 0.50 mi (0.8 km)
- Turns: 4

South Georgia Motorsports Park (SGMP) is a motorsports facility located in Adel, Georgia, United States, close to nearby Cecil and 20 miles north of Valdosta. It features a quarter-mile drag strip and a half-mile oval track, hosting a variety of racing events including drag racing and other motorsports activities, serving as a venue for both local and national competitions.

== History ==
South Georgia Motorsports Park was opened in April 2004 as a multi-purpose racing venue. The facility includes a dragstrip and a 0.5-mile oval. In its early years, SGMP hosted local and regional events, establishing itself as a key motorsports destination in the southeastern United States.

In August 2014, South Georgia Motorsports Park faced significant financial and legal challenges due to unpaid taxes. The Georgia Department of Revenue reported that the property owners owed at least $90,000 in state taxes. A search warrant was served for the track's financial records. Co-owner Kimberly Wood was charged with theft by taking for sales and theft by taking withholding, and she turned herself in to authorities. Despite the investigation, the track remained open and hosted scheduled racing events. These issues contributed to the eventual sale of the facility.

In early 2015, the park was purchased by Ozzy Moya, an Orlando-based entrepreneur who also owned other drag racing facilities. Under Moya's ownership, SGMP signed a multi-year sanctioning agreement with the International Hot Rod Association (IHRA) in 2015, allowing it to host IHRA-sanctioned events. Notable events added during this period included the "Lights Out" radial tire racing series, which drew national attention to the track. However, with the financial situation of the IHRA, owned by a private equity firm, the sanctioning body ended up in a series of issues that caused Moya to flip the tracks back to the NHRA as a Division 2 track on September 20, 2016.

On January 22, 2017, South Georgia Motorsports Park sustained heavy damage from a tornado that struck around 4:30 a.m. amid a series of severe storms across southern Georgia. The damage included the complete destruction of the hospitality and media suites atop the grandstands, as well as harm to fencing and other structures. Debris such as barrels, signs, insulation, and garbage was scattered across the property. Cleanup efforts began immediately, with community support aiding recovery, and the track proceeded with planned events like the Lights Out 8 radial racing competition in February 2017.

The facility experienced a change in ownership in 2023 when it was sold to Raul and Jennifer Torres. SGMP reopened under the new management in October 2023, with plans to expand offerings such as weekly racing events, monster truck shows, and the addition of a mud bogging area. The Torreses focused on revitalizing the track, investing in improvements to support grassroots racing and attract larger audiences.

Following the sale of National Trail Raceway in Hebron, Ohio, which had held the Jeg's NHRA SPORTSnationals, to a rival sanctioning body, South Georgia Motorsports Park announced in April 2025 as part of a multi-year extension with the National Hot Rod Association (NHRA) that the Jeg's NHRA SPORTSnationals will move to the track, marking its growing involvement with national-level competitions. Later that year, on August 28, 2025, the NHRA announced that SGMP would join its Mission Foods Drag Racing Series schedule starting in 2026. The track will host the NHRA Southern Nationals from May 1–3, 2026, reviving a historic event previously held at Atlanta Dragway in Commerce, Georgia until its sale to a rival sanctioning body. This multi-year agreement brings professional drag racing categories such as Top Fuel and Funny Car to the venue.
