= Teams and drivers of the 2023 NASCAR Cup Series =

The 2023 NASCAR Cup Series saw 36 chartered teams (those who own a charter guaranteeing them entry into every championship race) and several open entries compete throughout the season.

== Teams and drivers ==
=== Chartered teams ===
Manufacturer	Team	No.	Driver	Crew chief
Chevrolet	Hendrick Motorsports	5	Kyle Larson	Cliff Daniels 32; Kevin Meendering 4
Chevrolet	Hendrick Motorsports	9	Chase Elliott 29	Alan Gustafson 32; Tom Gray 4
Chevrolet	Hendrick Motorsports	9	Josh Berry 5	Alan Gustafson 32; Tom Gray 4
Chevrolet	Hendrick Motorsports	9	Jordan Taylor 1	Alan Gustafson 32; Tom Gray 4
Chevrolet	Hendrick Motorsports	9	Corey LaJoie 1 (Note: Corey LaJoie is running the full season split between the No. 7 Spire Motorsports car and the No. 9 Hendrick Motorsports car.)	Alan Gustafson 32; Tom Gray 4
Chevrolet	Hendrick Motorsports	24	William Byron	Rudy Fugle 32; Brian Campe 4
Chevrolet	Hendrick Motorsports	48	Alex Bowman 33	Blake Harris 32; Greg Ives 4
Chevrolet	Hendrick Motorsports	48	Josh Berry 3	Blake Harris 32; Greg Ives 4
Chevrolet	JTG Daugherty Racing	47	Ricky Stenhouse Jr.	Mike Kelley
Chevrolet	Kaulig Racing	16	A. J. Allmendinger	Matt Swiderski
Chevrolet	Kaulig Racing	31	Justin Haley	Trent Owens 32; Eddie Pardue 4
Chevrolet	Legacy Motor Club	42	Noah Gragson (R) 21	Luke Lambert
Chevrolet	Legacy Motor Club	42	Grant Enfinger 1	Luke Lambert
Chevrolet	Legacy Motor Club	42	Josh Berry 2	Luke Lambert
Chevrolet	Legacy Motor Club	42	Mike Rockenfeller 3	Luke Lambert
Chevrolet	Legacy Motor Club	42	Carson Hocevar 8	Luke Lambert
Chevrolet	Legacy Motor Club	42	John Hunter Nemechek 1	Luke Lambert
Chevrolet	Legacy Motor Club	43	Erik Jones	Dave Elenz 34; Joey Cohen 1 Danny Efland 1
Chevrolet	Live Fast Motorsports	78	B. J. McLeod 23	George Ingram
Chevrolet	Live Fast Motorsports	78	Josh Bilicki 10	George Ingram
Chevrolet	Live Fast Motorsports	78	Anthony Alfredo 2	George Ingram
Chevrolet	Live Fast Motorsports	78	Sheldon Creed 1	George Ingram
Chevrolet	Richard Childress Racing	3	Austin Dillon	Keith Rodden 34; Justin Alexander 2
Chevrolet	Richard Childress Racing	8	Kyle Busch	Randall Burnett
Chevrolet	Spire Motorsports	7	Corey LaJoie 35	Ryan Sparks
Chevrolet	Spire Motorsports	7	Carson Hocevar 1	Ryan Sparks
Chevrolet	Spire Motorsports	77	Ty Dillon	Kevin Bellicourt 20; Kevin Manion 15; Peter Sospenzo 1
Chevrolet	Trackhouse Racing	1	Ross Chastain	Phil Surgen
Chevrolet	Trackhouse Racing	99	Daniel Suárez	Travis Mack
Ford	Front Row Motorsports	34	Michael McDowell	Travis Peterson
Ford	Front Row Motorsports	38	Todd Gilliland 30 (Note: Todd Gilliland is running the full season split between the No. 38 and 36 Front Row Motorsports cars and the No. 15 and 51 Rick Ware Racing cars.)	Ryan Bergenty
Ford	Front Row Motorsports	38	Zane Smith 6	Ryan Bergenty
Ford	RFK Racing	6	Brad Keselowski	Matt McCall
Ford	RFK Racing	17	Chris Buescher	Scott Graves
Ford	Rick Ware Racing	15	Riley Herbst 2	Billy Plourde 31; Jerry Kelley 5
Ford	Rick Ware Racing	15	J. J. Yeley 18	Billy Plourde 31; Jerry Kelley 5
Ford	Rick Ware Racing	15	Todd Gilliland 1	Billy Plourde 31; Jerry Kelley 5
Ford	Rick Ware Racing	15	Jenson Button 3	Billy Plourde 31; Jerry Kelley 5
Ford	Rick Ware Racing	15	Brennan Poole 7	Billy Plourde 31; Jerry Kelley 5
Ford	Rick Ware Racing	15	Gray Gaulding 1	Billy Plourde 31; Jerry Kelley 5
Ford	Rick Ware Racing	15	Andy Lally 3	Billy Plourde 31; Jerry Kelley 5
Ford	Rick Ware Racing	15	Ryan Newman 1	Billy Plourde 31; Jerry Kelley 5
Ford	Rick Ware Racing	51	Cody Ware 7	Jerry Kelley 31; Billy Plourde 5
Ford	Rick Ware Racing	51	Matt Crafton 1	Jerry Kelley 31; Billy Plourde 5
Ford	Rick Ware Racing	51	Zane Smith 1	Jerry Kelley 31; Billy Plourde 5
Ford	Rick Ware Racing	51	J. J. Yeley 8	Jerry Kelley 31; Billy Plourde 5
Ford	Rick Ware Racing	51	Ryan Newman 7	Jerry Kelley 31; Billy Plourde 5
Ford	Rick Ware Racing	51	Todd Gilliland 4	Jerry Kelley 31; Billy Plourde 5
Ford	Rick Ware Racing	51	Andy Lally 2	Jerry Kelley 31; Billy Plourde 5
Ford	Rick Ware Racing	51	Cole Custer 6	Jerry Kelley 31; Billy Plourde 5
Ford	Stewart–Haas Racing	4	Kevin Harvick	Rodney Childers 35; Stephen Doran 1
Ford	Stewart–Haas Racing	10	Aric Almirola	Drew Blickensderfer
Ford	Stewart–Haas Racing	14	Chase Briscoe	Johnny Klausmeier 14; Mike Bugarewicz 2 Richard Boswell 20
Ford	Stewart–Haas Racing	41	Ryan Preece	Chad Johnston
Ford	Team Penske	2	Austin Cindric	Jeremy Bullins 26; Brian Wilson 10
Ford	Team Penske	12	Ryan Blaney	Jonathan Hassler
Ford	Team Penske	22	Joey Logano	Paul Wolfe
Ford	Wood Brothers Racing	21	Harrison Burton	Brian Wilson 26; Jeremy Bullins 10
Toyota	23XI Racing	23	Bubba Wallace	Bootie Barker
Toyota	23XI Racing	45	Tyler Reddick	Billy Scott 35; Dave Rogers 1
Toyota	Joe Gibbs Racing	11	Denny Hamlin	Chris Gabehart
Toyota	Joe Gibbs Racing	19	Martin Truex Jr.	James Small
Toyota	Joe Gibbs Racing	20	Christopher Bell	Adam Stevens
Toyota	Joe Gibbs Racing	54	Ty Gibbs (R)	Chris Gayle

=== Non-chartered teams ===
==== Limited schedule ====
Manufacturer	Team	No.	Driver	Crew chief	Races
Chevrolet	Beard Motorsports	62	Austin Hill	Darren Shaw	6
Chevrolet	Kaulig Racing	13	Chandler Smith	Eddie Pardue	4
Chevrolet	Kaulig Racing	13	Jonathan Davenport	Eddie Pardue	1
Chevrolet	Legacy Motor Club	84	Jimmie Johnson	Todd Gordon	3
Chevrolet	Richard Childress Racing	33	Brodie Kostecki	Justin Alexander	1
Chevrolet	The Money Team Racing	50	Conor Daly	Tony Eury Jr.	2
Chevrolet	Trackhouse Racing	91	Kimi Räikkönen	Darian Grubb	1
Chevrolet	Trackhouse Racing	91	Shane van Gisbergen	Darian Grubb	2
Ford	Front Row Motorsports	36	Zane Smith	Chris Lawson	1
Ford	Front Row Motorsports	36	Todd Gilliland	Chris Lawson	1
Ford	Front Row Motorsports	36	Riley Herbst	Tony Manzer	2
Toyota	23XI Racing	67	Travis Pastrana	Eric Phillips	1
Toyota	23XI Racing	67	Kamui Kobayashi	Eric Phillips	1

=== Changes ===
==== Teams ====
- On August 25, 2022, Front Row Motorsports announced that Zane Smith will drive a part-time third car for the team in select races including the Daytona 500.
- On August 28, Carson Hocevar was announced as the driver of the No. 42 at the Darlington summer race.
- On November 4, 2022, seven-time NASCAR champion Jimmie Johnson purchased an ownership stake in Petty GMS Motorsports, which later rebranded to Legacy Motor Club. He will run select races in 2023, including an attempt to make the 2023 Daytona 500.
- On January 18, 2023, Kaulig announced that Chandler Smith will attempt to make his Cup Series debut in the 2023 Daytona 500, driving the No. 13 car. He will also run four additional races, which includes the NASCAR All-Star Race.
- On January 17, 2023, it was announced that Travis Pastrana would drive the No. 67 car for 23XI Racing with sponsorship from Black Rifle Coffee Company. Eric Phillips will be the crew chief.
- On February 11, 2023, Bob Pockrass from Fox Sports reported that Finish Line Motorsports Marketing, a marketing agency in business since 1997, would start a race team that would enter the No. 80 Ford driven by J. J. Yeley in the 2023 Daytona 500. However, the team did not enter the race.
- On February 18, 2023, it was reported that MBM Motorsports would not run any Cup Series races in 2023, although team owner Carl Long stated that they do have cars prepared pending sponsorship. The team's last Cup appearance was in 2022, when the No. 55 driven by J. J. Yeley finished 25th at Talladega.

==== Drivers ====
- On July 15, 2022, Petty GMS Motorsports (now Legacy Motor Club) announced that Ty Dillon would not return to the No. 42 in 2023. On August 10, 2022, Noah Gragson was announced to replace Dillon, having signed a two-year contract with LMC. On June 8, 2023, LMC announced that Gragson would not run the race at Sonoma due to experiencing concussion-like symptoms after his crash in the previous week's race at Gateway. Grant Enfinger, who drives for LMC co-owner Maury Gallagher's GMS Racing team in the Truck Series, filled in for Gragson in the No. 42 car and made his Cup Series debut. It was Enfinger's first Cup Series attempt since 2011, when he failed to qualify for the season-finale at Homestead driving for Sinica Motorsports in the team's only attempt. On August 5, 2023, LMC announced that Gragson was suspended after he liked an offensive image on social media related to the murder of George Floyd in 2020, one day before the scheduled Cup Series race at Michigan, with NASCAR suspending him indefinitely as well. Legacy Motor Club announced later that day that Josh Berry would fill in for Gragson at Michigan. Mike Rockenfeller was announced as the driver of the No. 42 at Indianapolis and Watkins Glen. On August 10, 2023, Gragson requested to be released from his contract with LMC so he can focus on the reinstatement process. Carson Hocevar was announced as the driver of the No. 42 at Darlington, Kansas, and the Bristol night race. On September 12, NASCAR lifted Gragson's suspension after he completed diversity and inclusion training; he has yet to announce his plans following his reinstatement. On October 4, Hocevar was signed to drive the No. 42 for the final four races. On October 15, it was announced that John Hunter Nemechek would drive the No. 42 at Homestead.
- After suffering a concussion in qualifying for the 2022 race at Pocono, Kurt Busch announced on October 15, 2022, that he would not run full-time in 2023. Tyler Reddick, who was set to join the team in 2024, will move over from Richard Childress Racing a year earlier and replace Busch in the No. 45. After his move to 23XI for 2024 was announced, Reddick was going to return to RCR for one more year but was bought out of his last year of his contract in order to replace Busch in the No. 45 in 2023. (Busch has a multi-year deal with 23XI and will stay with the team in an advisory role and could drive part-time for the team once he gets cleared to race again). On August 26, 2023, Busch formally announced his retirement from Cup Series racing.
- On August 26, 2022, although Aric Almirola announced he would retire from driving full-time after the 2022 season, he announced that he has signed a multi-year deal with Stewart–Haas Racing, delaying his retirement.
- After months of rumors and speculation over his 2023 plans and contract negotiations with Joe Gibbs Racing, Kyle Busch announced that he would leave JGR and join Richard Childress Racing beginning in 2023 in a multi-year deal. Busch will replace Tyler Reddick, who was originally announced to drive a third RCR car in 2023 before leaving for 23XI Racing in 2024, but after Kurt Busch's decision to not run full-time after his concussion, Reddick's contract was bought out by 23XI Racing, allowing him to go to 23XI a year early.
- On November 15, 2022, it was announced that Ty Gibbs would replace Busch and the car would be renumbered to the No. 54, the number Gibbs used in the Xfinity Series. Gibbs' Xfinity Series crew chief, Chris Gayle, will also move up to the Cup Series, replacing Ben Beshore.
- On October 3, 2022, Beard Motorsports owner Linda Beard told Dustin Albino from Jayski's Silly Season Site that the team will enter the 2023 Daytona 500. Noah Gragson will not return to this car in 2023 as he will drive the Petty GMS No. 42 car full-time. On October 28, 2022, the team announced that Austin Hill, who drives full-time for Richard Childress Racing in the Xfinity Series, would drive the car in seven races (both Daytona and both Talladega races, Atlanta, Michigan and the Charlotte Roval in 2023).
- On October 3, 2022, Jordan Bianchi from The Athletic reported that A.J. Allmendinger, who has driven this car part-time as well as Kaulig's No. 16 Xfinity Series car full-time, would drive the No. 16 Cup Series car full-time in 2023. It would be his first full season in the Cup Series since 2018. On October 5, 2022, Allmendinger was officially announced as the full-time driver of the No. 16. Matt Swiderski will return as crew chief.
- On November 16, 2022, Stewart–Haas Racing announced that Ryan Preece will replace Cole Custer in the No. 41 in 2023 while Custer will move back to the Xfinity Series.
- On December 12, 2022, Josh Bilicki was announced to drive the No. 78 on a part-time schedule.
- On January 31, 2023, Rick Ware Racing announced that Riley Herbst had signed to drive the No. 15 at the 2023 Daytona 500.
- On February 7, 2023, Front Row Motorsports announced that Zane Smith will attempt to make the 2023 Daytona 500 in the No. 36. In addition, Smith will drive the No. 38 at Phoenix, Talladega, Charlotte, Sonoma, Texas, and the Charlotte Roval, sharing the ride with Todd Gilliland.
- On March 3, 2023, Chase Elliott suffered a leg injury while snowboarding in Colorado. JR Motorsports Xfinity Series driver Josh Berry would substitute for him in the Hendrick Motorsports No. 9 car in the race at Las Vegas two days later. On March 7, 2023, Hendrick announced that Berry would continue to fill in for Elliott in the No. 9 for five of the next six races. The only one of those six where he will not be in the car is the race at COTA, where IMSA driver Jordan Taylor will make his NASCAR debut filling in for Elliott. Taylor was teammates with Hendrick Motorsports Vice Chairman Jeff Gordon in the 2017 24 Hours of Daytona which they won. On May 30, 2023, NASCAR suspended Elliott for one race after deliberately wrecking Denny Hamlin at Charlotte. Corey LaJoie was announced to be driving the No. 9 at Gateway, with Craftsman Truck Series regular Carson Hocevar making his series debut in the No. 7 for Spire Motorsports, taking LaJoie's regular place.
- On March 8, 2023, Trackhouse Racing announced that 2007 Formula One World Champion Kimi Räikkönen would return to the No. 91 at COTA. Räikkönen previously drove the No. 91 at Watkins Glen in 2022. He also scored his final F1 victory at COTA in 2018. On May 18, three-time Supercars champion Shane van Gisbergen was announced to drive the No. 91 at the Chicago street race.
- On March 9, 2023, Kaulig Racing announced that dirt track racing driver Jonathan Davenport would drive their No. 13 car at the Bristol dirt race. He will attempt to make his Cup Series debut and first NASCAR start since failing to qualify for the Truck Series spring race at Martinsville in 2013.
- On March 9, 2023, it was announced that 2009 Formula One World Champion Jenson Button would drive the Rick Ware Racing No. 15 in a collaboration with Stewart–Haas Racing at Circuit of the Americas, the Chicago Street Course, and the Indianapolis Motor Speedway road course.
- On April 8, 2023, Cody Ware stated that he will not be driving the Rick Ware Racing No. 51 at the Bristol dirt race. He was substituted by Truck Series driver Matt Crafton for the race. On April 10, 2023, Ware was indefinitely suspended by NASCAR after being arrested and charged with a felony assault by strangulation as well as a misdemeanor assault on a woman in Iredell County, North Carolina. On April 12, 2023, Rick Ware Racing announced that Zane Smith would drive the No. 51 at Martinsville. On May 5, 2023, Rick Ware Racing announced that Ryan Newman will drive the No. 51 in select races in 2023, starting with Darlington.
- On June 5, 2023, it was announced that Andy Lally would drive for Rick Ware Racing in the five remaining road course races of 2023: Sonoma, the Chicago Street Course, the Indianapolis Road Course, Watkins Glen and the Charlotte Roval. He will take over the No. 15 car for Sonoma, Watkins Glen, and the Roval, and the No. 51 car for the Chicago Street Course and the Indy Road Course, due to Jenson Button already being scheduled to drive the No. 15 car at those tracks.
- On June 7, 2023, it was announced that multi-time FIA World Endurance champion and 2021 24 Hours of Le Mans winner Kamui Kobayashi would drive the No. 67 for 23XI Racing at the Indianapolis Motor Speedway Road Course.

==== Crew chiefs ====
- On August 26, 2022, Greg Ives, crew chief of the Hendrick Motorsports No. 48 driven by Alex Bowman, announced that he would be stepping down from the role to spend more time with his family. On October 14, 2022, Blake Harris, who was the crew chief of the Front Row Motorsports No. 34 car in 2022, was announced to replace Ives as Bowman's crew chief.
- On September 2, 2022, Justin Alexander, crew chief of the Richard Childress Racing No. 3 driven by Austin Dillon, announced that he would be stepping down from the role. On October 28, 2022, RCR announced that Keith Rodden, who crew chiefed in the Cup Series from 2014 to 2017 for Jamie McMurray at Chip Ganassi Racing and then for Kasey Kahne at Hendrick Motorsports, would be Dillon's new crew chief in 2023.
- On October 25, 2022, Noah Gragson's Xfinity Series crew chief Luke Lambert was announced to move from JR Motorsports to Petty GMS (later renamed Legacy Motor Club) on their No. 42 car.
- On November 9, 2022, it was announced that Brian Pattie would leave for Kyle Busch Motorsports to crew chief their No. 51 truck in the NASCAR Craftsman Truck Series. Mike Kelley was announced as the new crew chief of the No. 47.
- On November 16, 2022, Stewart–Haas Racing announced that Chad Johnston would replace Mike Shiplett as the crew chief of their No. 41 car. Johnston was previously the crew chief of the No. 17 truck for David Gilliland Racing (now TRICON Garage) in the Truck Series where he worked with multiple drivers including Preece. Johnston is returning to SHR having previously worked for the team as the crew chief of their No. 14 car in 2014 and 2015 when it was driven by team co-owner Tony Stewart.
- On November 23, 2022, Front Row Motorsports announced that Travis Peterson, who was the engineer and interim crew chief for the RFK Racing No. 17 in 2022, will be the new crew chief of the No. 34, replacing Blake Harris, who left for Hendrick Motorsports to be the new crew chief of the No. 48 car. Ryan Bergenty, who was the car chief for McDowell, will be the new crew chief for the No. 38 car replacing Seth Barbour, who was the crew chief for that car in 2022, who has been promoted to technical director for FRM.
- On January 12, 2023, Live Fast Motorsports announced that David (George) Ingram Jr. would be the new crew chief of their No. 78 in 2023. Ingram moves to LFM from team co-owner B. J. McLeod's Xfinity Series team, B. J. McLeod Motorsports, where he was previously a crew chief for them in that series. Lee Leslie, who was the crew chief of the No. 78 car in 2022, switched teams and series with Ingram and became a crew chief for BJMM in the Xfinity Series in 2023.
- On January 23, 2023, Legacy Motor Club announced that Todd Gordon would crew chief the No. 84 for Jimmie Johnson.
- On January 26, 2023, it was revealed through the release of the Clash entry list that Jerry Kelley would be the new crew chief of Rick Ware Racing's No. 51, replacing Billy Plourde, who moved to the team's No. 15 car in 2023, replacing Kevyn Rebolledo.
- On June 20, 2023, Stewart–Haas Racing announced that Xfinity Series crew chief Richard Boswell would replace Johnny Klausmeier as the crew chief of the No. 14 driven by Chase Briscoe starting at Nashville. Klausmeier was transferred to SHR's vehicle performance group following his four-race suspension in late-May.
- On July 25, 2023, Spire Motorsports announced that Kevin Bellicourt would be replaced as the crew chief of the team's No. 77 car driven by Ty Dillon due to poor performance from the team in comparison to their other car, the No. 7 driven by Corey LaJoie. Kevin Manion, the crew chief of Spire's Xfinity Series No. 77 car and Truck Series No. 7 truck, was announced as the interim crew chief of the No. 77 car for the rest of the year except for the race at Daytona where he will be at the Milwaukee Mile on the same weekend crew chiefing in the Truck Series race.
- On August 28, 2023, Team Penske announced that Jeremy Bullins, the crew chief of their No. 2 car driven by Austin Cindric, and Brian Wilson, the crew chief of the Penske-aligned Wood Brothers Racing No. 21 car driven by Harrison Burton, would switch cars for the rest of the season starting at Darlington in September after both cars failed to qualify for the 2023 playoffs. Wilson and Cindric reunite after the two of them won the 2020 NASCAR Xfinity Series championship for Penske and Bullins reunites with the Wood Brothers after previously working as the team's crew chief when Ryan Blaney drove the No. 21 car from 2015 to 2017.

==== Interim crew chiefs ====
- On March 15, 2023, NASCAR suspended all four Hendrick Motorsports crew chiefs (Cliff Daniels, Alan Gustafson, Rudy Fugle and Blake Harris) as well as Kaulig Racing No. 31 car crew chief Trent Owens for four races (Atlanta, COTA, Richmond, and the Bristol dirt race) after it was discovered during practice for the race at Phoenix in March that the hood louvers on all five cars were illegally modified. As a result, each team received an L2 penalty. On March 16, Kaulig announced that they would appeal the penalty and Owens' suspension was deferred until after the appeal date. On March 15, Hendrick announced that they would appeal the penalty but would choose to not delay their crew chiefs' suspensions until after the appeal date. The next day, the team announced their interim crew chiefs:
  - Kevin Meendering will crew chief the No. 5. He returns to the same role he had in four races in 2022 when Cliff Daniels was suspended. He was also Jimmie Johnson's permanent crew chief for part of the 2019 season.
  - Tom Gray will crew chief the No. 9. He is the car's engineer and was also the interim crew chief for it at Watkins Glen in 2021 when Alan Gustafson was suspended.
  - Brian Campe will crew chief the No. 24. He works as a technical director for Hendrick and was also the crew chief for the JR Motorsports No. 5 car in what is now the Xfinity Series in 2009.
  - Greg Ives will crew chief the No. 48. He was the previously the permanent crew chief of the car until the end of the 2022 season, stepping down from the job for a non-crew chiefing job at Hendrick that would allow him to spend more time with his family.
- On April 6, 2023, NASCAR announced another penalty to Hendrick Motorsports as William Byron's No. 24 car and Alex Bowman's No. 48 car were found to have illegally modified greenhouse areas (the car's roof as well as the front and back windows) after the race at Richmond. Interim crew chiefs Brian Campe and Greg Ives were suspended for two races (Martinsville and Talladega, and not the next race, the Bristol dirt race, due to the penalty being announced late). Hendrick chose not to appeal the penalty. The permanent crew chiefs of those cars, Rudy Fugle for the No. 24 and Blake Harris for the No. 48, would return at Martinsville after their four race suspensions ended, so the team did not need to have third-string crew chiefs for both cars.
- On April 19, 2023, NASCAR announced that Keith Rodden, the crew chief of the No. 3 car for Richard Childress Racing driven by Austin Dillon, would be suspended for two races (as part of an L1 penalty) after the team's car from the race at Martinsville was found to have an improperly assembled underwing when the car was taken to their R&D Center after the race. Although RCR appealed the penalty, they chose not to delay Rodden's suspension until after the appeal date. Justin Alexander, who was the permanent crew chief of the No. 3 car in 2022 and now works as RCR's director of vehicle performance, returned to serve as the car's interim crew chief at Talladega and Dover.
- On May 12, 2023, NASCAR ejected 23XI Racing No. 45 car crew chief Billy Scott at Darlington after his car, driven by Tyler Reddick, failed pre-qualifying inspection twice. Dave Rogers, the performance director for 23XI, was the interim crew chief for the No. 45 car at Darlington.
- On May 31, 2023, NASCAR issued an L3 penalty to Chase Briscoe and the No. 14 Stewart–Haas Racing team after a counterfeit part was found on the car after it was taken to the NASCAR R&D Center after the Coca-Cola 600. Crew chief Johnny Klausmeier was suspended for the next six races (Gateway, Sonoma, Nashville, the Chicago Street Course, Atlanta and New Hampshire) The team decided not to appeal the penalty and the team's performance director, Mike Bugarewicz, was announced as the interim crew chief for those six races.
- On June 7, 2023, NASCAR issued an L1 penalty to Erik Jones and the No. 43 Legacy Motor Club team after an illegally modified greenhouse area was found on their Gateway car after it was taken to the NASCAR R&D Center. On that day, the team had not yet decided if they would appeal the penalty but did decide that they would start crew chief Dave Elenz's two race suspension and Joey Cohen, the team's Vice President of Race Operations, would be the interim crew chief at Sonoma. The team did eventually decide to appeal the penalty and Elenz was the crew chief of the No. 43 car at Nashville. After the team lost their appeal, Danny Efland, the No. 43 car's engineer, would be the interim crew chief at the Chicago Street Course when Elenz served the second race of his suspension.
- On August 20, 2023, Rodney Childers announced that he would not crew chief the Stewart–Haas Racing No. 4 driven by Kevin Harvick at Watkins Glen due to a family emergency that took place the morning before the race. Stephen Doran served as the interim crew chief for the race.

==== Manufacturers ====
- On November 28, 2022, Rick Ware Racing announced that they would have a technical alliance with RFK Racing beginning in 2023, ending their alliance with Stewart–Haas Racing that they had for one year in 2022.
- On December 1, 2022, Live Fast Motorsports announced that they would switch from Ford to Chevrolet and have ECR Engines in 2023.

==== Sponsorship ====
- On December 20, 2021, Joe Gibbs Racing No. 18 car primary sponsor M&M's and parent company Mars, Incorporated announced they would be leaving NASCAR and not return in 2023. JGR was unable to find a replacement sponsor. (A deal with Oracle Corporation fell through.) As a result, driver Kyle Busch left JGR for Richard Childress Racing and was replaced by Ty Gibbs who brought sponsorship from Monster Energy, which sponsored him in the Xfinity and ARCA Series. They will sponsor him in the Cup Series in a "strong capacity".
- On January 4, 2023, it was revealed that Adrenaline Shoc (A SHOC Energy), which had been a sponsor of the Hendrick Motorsports No. 9 for two races in each of the last two years, will not return as a sponsor in 2023. On February 16, 2023, driver Chase Elliott was announced as the latest member of the Coca-Cola Racing Family. Coca-Cola has had a rich history with the Elliott family, with Bill Elliott being a founding member of the Coca-Cola Racing Family in 1998. This also marks the iconic soft drink brand's return to Hendrick Motorsports since it last sponsored Jeff Gordon in 1996.
- On January 16, 2023, Richard Childress Racing announced that Netspend, a financial solutions company, will sponsor the No. 8 for the COTA race and select races in 2023.
- On January 31, 2023, SunnyD was announced as the sponsor of the Rick Ware Racing No. 15 driven by Riley Herbst at the 2023 Daytona 500. In addition, the orange juice brand will sponsor the Stewart–Haas Racing No. 4 driven by Kevin Harvick at Darlington and the Kansas playoff race.
- On February 3, 2023, Joe Gibbs Racing announced that Monster Energy will sponsor the No. 54 driven by Ty Gibbs for majority of the 2023 season. Monster Energy has supported Gibbs since 2019, including his 2021 ARCA Menards Series and 2022 NASCAR Xfinity Series championships.
- On February 15, 2023, hard rock band Guns N' Roses announced it will sponsor the Legacy Motor Club No. 43 driven by Erik Jones for the 2023 Daytona 500.
- On April 4, 2023, Procter & Gamble were announced as the sponsor of Kaulig Racing at the Bristol dirt race, with the No. 16 driven by A. J. Allmendinger sporting a Gain paint scheme and the No. 31 driven by Justin Haley in the Tide colors.
- On May 9, 2023, Live Fast Motorsports announced that YouTuber Eric Estepp's channel Out of the Groove and podcast The Daily Downforce will sponsor the No. 78 driven by B. J. McLeod at Darlington.
- On May 9, 2023, Hendrick Motorsports announced that Jinya Ramen Bar signed on to sponsor the No. 5 driven by Kyle Larson through 2024.
- On June 5, 2023, it was announced that Camping World would sponsor Andy Lally in the five road course races he would drive the Rick Ware Racing No. 15 car in. This is their first time back in NASCAR since ending their title sponsorship of the Truck Series after the 2022 season.
- On September 25, 2023, Stewart–Haas Racing announced that Old Spice and Wonder Bread would sponsor the No. 14 driven by Chase Briscoe and the No. 41 driven by Ryan Preece, respectively, at Talladega as a tribute to the 2006 film Talladega Nights: The Ballad of Ricky Bobby.
