= Cliff Daniels =

NASCAR crew chief

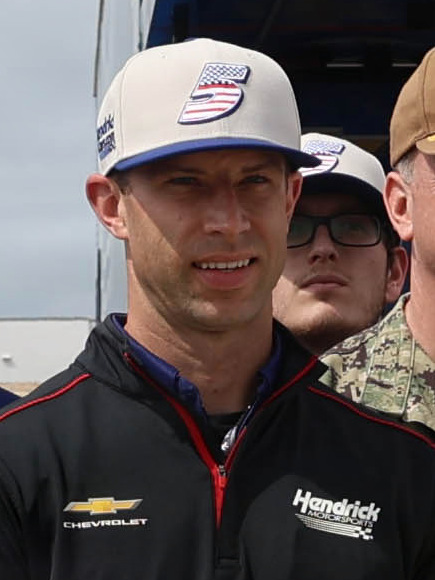
- Daniels in 2026

Personal information
- Born: Clifton Oliver Daniels; June 30, 1988 (age 38) Smithfield, Virginia, U.S.
- Education: University of North Carolina at Charlotte
- Occupation: Crew chief

Sport
- Country: United States
- Sport: Motor racing
- League: NASCAR Cup Series
- Team: 5. Hendrick Motorsports

Clifton Oliver Daniels (born June 30, 1988) is an American crew chief who works for Hendrick Motorsports as the crew chief of their No. 5 Chevrolet Camaro ZL1 in the NASCAR Cup Series driven by Kyle Larson. Daniels has won three Cup championships as a crew chief.

== Racing career ==
Daniels had a short racing career as a driver, racing late model cars at short tracks in his home state of Virginia before pursuing a mechanical engineering degree at University of North Carolina at Charlotte. After graduating, he joined RAB Racing in 2011. He then moved to Stewart–Haas Racing, where he served as the race engineer of the No. 14 Chevrolet driven by Tony Stewart from 2013 to 2014. In December 2014, Daniels moved to Hendrick Motorsports to serve as the race engineer of the No. 48 Chevrolet driven by Jimmie Johnson, helping Johnson win the 2016 Sprint Cup Series Championship. Following the 2018 season, Daniels moved to Hendrick's competition systems group before rejoining the No. 48 team at Sonoma in 2019.

On July 29, 2019, following a string of disappointing finishes during the 2019 season, Hendrick Motorsports announced that Daniels would replace Kevin Meendering as the crew chief of the No. 48.

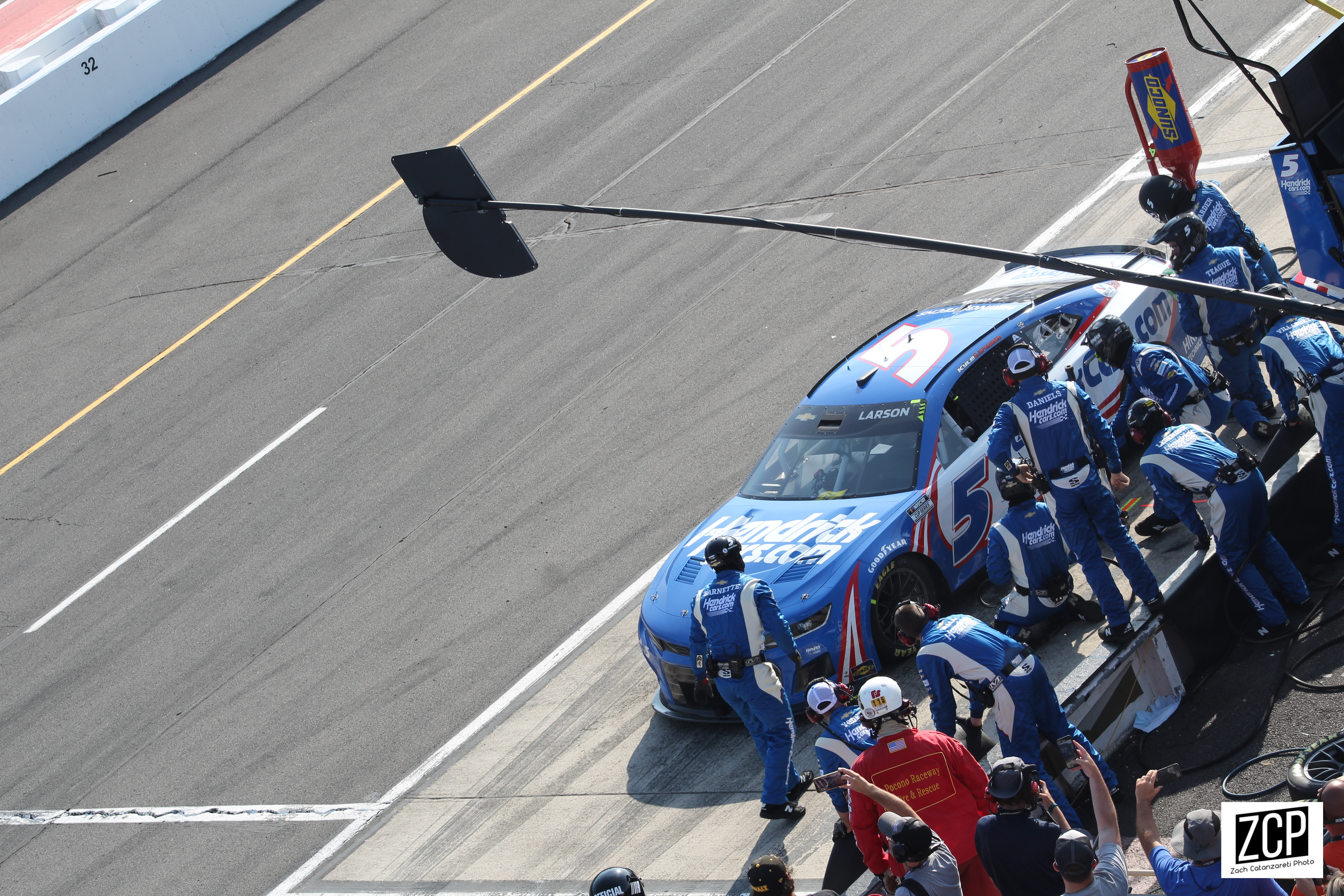
Daniels (standing on the pit wall) watching his pit crew make a pit stop in the race at Pocono in 2022

On October 28, 2020, Daniels was announced to become the crew chief for No. 5 of Kyle Larson. The 5 car would replace the No. 48 in 2021.

On March 7, 2021, Daniels earned his first win as a crew chief in the 2021 Pennzoil 400. Larson and Daniels won the Coca-Cola 600. A week later, Larson scored his first road course win at Sonoma. The following week, Larson won the NASCAR All-Star Race, becoming the ninth driver to win the All-Star Race more than once. Larson scored his third consecutive win at Nashville (All-Star races, as they are not points-paying, are not included). Larson and Daniels scored their fifth win of the season at Watkins Glen. Larson clinched the regular season championship.

In the playoffs, Larson scored his sixth win of the season at the Bristol night race. Larson scored his seventh win of the season at the Charlotte Roval after overcoming an electrical issue. In the third round of the playoffs, Larson won at Texas to secure a spot into the Championship 4. A week later, Larson scored his ninth win of the season at Kansas. In the Championship 4 at Phoenix, Larson started on the pole and led 107 laps en route to his tenth win of the season and clinched his first NASCAR Cup Series championship.

Larson started on the pole at the 2022 Daytona 500 and finished 32nd after he was involved in a crash on lap 192. The following week, Larson scored his first win of the season at Auto Club Speedway. On June 14, Daniels was suspended for four races due to a tire and wheel loss during the Sonoma race. At Las Vegas, Larson was right rear hooked down the frontstretch by Bubba Wallace on lap 94 and Christopher Bell was also caught in the wreck. During the caution, Wallace engaged in a shoving match with Larson. The incident led to Wallace's one race suspension. A week later, Larson scored his third win of the season at Homestead.

On March 15, 2023, NASCAR suspended all four Hendrick Motorsports crew chiefs (Daniels, Alan Gustafson, Rudy Fugle and Blake Harris) as well as Kaulig Racing No. 31 car crew chief Trent Owens for four races after it was discovered during practice for the race at Phoenix in March that the hood louvers on all five cars were illegally modified. As a result, each team received an L2 penalty (a loss of 100 driver and owner points as well as the four-race crew chief suspension). On March 29, the National Motorsports Appeals Panel amended the penalty, upholding the fine and Daniels' suspension but the No. 5 team has restored the owner, driver, and playoff points. Larson won at Richmond, Martinsville, and the NASCAR All-Star Race

On September 3, Larson and Daniels won the Southern 500 to clinch a spot into the Round of 12. Larson won at Las Vegas to make the Championship 4.

At the Kansas spring race, Larson and Daniels won by 0.001 seconds over Chris Buescher, the closest finish in NASCAR Cup Series history. Larson attempted to run both the Indianapolis 500 and the Coca-Cola 600 on the same day, but the rain delayed the Indy 500 caused him to miss the start of the Coke 600 and was substituted by Justin Allgaier who finished 13th. Larson scored his third win of the season at Sonoma. On July 21, Larson and Daniels won the Brickyard 400, their third crown jewel win. During the playoffs, Larson scored wins at the Bristol night race and at the Charlotte Roval.

In 2025, Larson and Daniels won eatly at Homestead. Three weeks later, Larson scored his second win of the season at the Bristol spring race. He scored his third win of the season at the Kansas spring race. Despite not winning a race during the playoffs, Larson made the Championship 4. In the season finale at Phoenix, Larson suffered a right front tire issue and went a lap down but got the wave around when a caution came out. On the final restart, Larson restarted fifth and finished third to win he and Daniels a second Cup Series championship.

On February 11, 2026, Larson and Daniels signed a five-year contract extension for them to remain with HMS through 2031. During the Chase, Larson and Daniels broke a 51-race winless streak by winning at Gateway. Two weeks later, Larson scored his second win of the season at Kansas. Larson won his first drafting track at Talladega. In the season finale at Homestead, Larson and Daniels clinched their third Cup Series championship.
