= Jeff Meendering =

American NASCAR crew chief (born 1977)

Personal information
- Full name: Jeff Steven Meendering
- Born: May 21, 1977 (age 49) Grand Rapids, Michigan, U.S.
- Occupation: Crew chief
- Years active: 1996–present

Sport
- Country: United States
- Sport: Motor racing
- League: NASCAR O'Reilly Auto Parts Series
- Team: No. 18 Joe Gibbs Racing

Jeff Steven Meendering (born May 21, 1977) is an American NASCAR crew chief who works for Joe Gibbs Racing as the crew chief of their No. 18 Toyota Supra in the NASCAR O'Reilly Auto Parts Series driven by William Sawalich. He previously worked as an O'Reilly Series crew chief for Stewart–Haas Racing, a Cup Series crew chief for Petty Enterprises and a car chief in the Cup Series for Hendrick Motorsports, SHR and JGR.

== Racing career ==
=== 1996–2007: Hendrick Motorsports ===
Meendering began working for Hendrick Motorsports in 1996. In 2000, he became a member of the pit crew for the No. 24 car driven by Jeff Gordon in the Cup Series. In 2005, he became the car chief for the No. 24 car.

In 2007, after Gordon's No. 24 car and Hendrick teammate Jimmie Johnson's No. 48 car failed inspection at Sonoma, resulting in Gordon's crew chief, Steve Letarte, and Johnson's crew chief, Chad Knaus, being suspended for six races, Meendering was the No. 24 car's interim crew chief. While serving as interim crew chief, Meendering was assisted by Ken Howes, Hendrick's Vice President of Competition at the time, and Ron Malec, Johnson's car chief and interim crew chief, was assisted by Lance McGrew, who worked for the team in Research and Development at the time.

=== 2008–2016: Petty Enterprises crew chief, SHR and JGR car chief ===
In 2008, he left Hendrick to become the crew chief for the famous Petty Enterprises No. 43 car driven by Bobby Labonte, replacing Doug Randolph, who left to go to Dale Earnhardt, Inc. as the crew chief of Paul Menard's No. 15 car. This was Meendering's first permanent crew chief job. He was recruited to the position by Robbie Loomis, the crew chief of Gordon's No. 24 car prior to Letarte, who worked for Petty Enterprises at the time as their Vice President of Race Operations, after the two previously worked at Hendrick together.

In 2009, Petty Enterprises merged into Gillett Evernham Motorsports and the two teams became Richard Petty Motorsports. Labonte and Meendering both did not continue with the team after the merger. Labonte went to Hall of Fame Racing to drive their No. 96 car and Meendering went to Stewart–Haas Racing (previously Haas CNC Racing) to serve as the car chief on their No. 14 car driven by Tony Stewart. Meendering eventually left SHR for Joe Gibbs Racing to become the car chief for Matt Kenseth's No. 20 car.

=== 2017–present: Xfinity Series crew chief ===
In 2017, Meendering returned to Stewart–Haas Racing to become the crew chief of their new Xfinity Series No. 00 car driven by Cole Custer. He returned to the role in 2018. In 2019, Meendering left SHR to return to JGR as the crew chief of their No. 19 Xfinity Series car driven by Brandon Jones. He continued in that position for the next three years. In 2023, Jones left JGR for JR Motorsports to replace Noah Gragson in their No. 9 car. Meendering stayed with JGR and moved over to the team's No. 18 car driven by rookie Sammy Smith. Smith would also leave JGR for JRM in 2024. Meendering remained with JGR, moving to the team's new fourth full-time car, the No. 81, driven by Chandler Smith. After Chandler Smith left JGR following the 2024 Xfinity Series season, Meendering moved back to the team's No. 18 car this time driven by rookie William Sawalich.

== Personal life ==
Meendering's younger brother, Kevin, is also a NASCAR crew chief. Kevin works for Hendrick Motorsports as the crew chief for their part-time No. 17 car in the Xfinity Series. The Meendering brothers are from Marne, Michigan.
