= Kevin Meendering =

American NASCAR crew chief (born 1981)

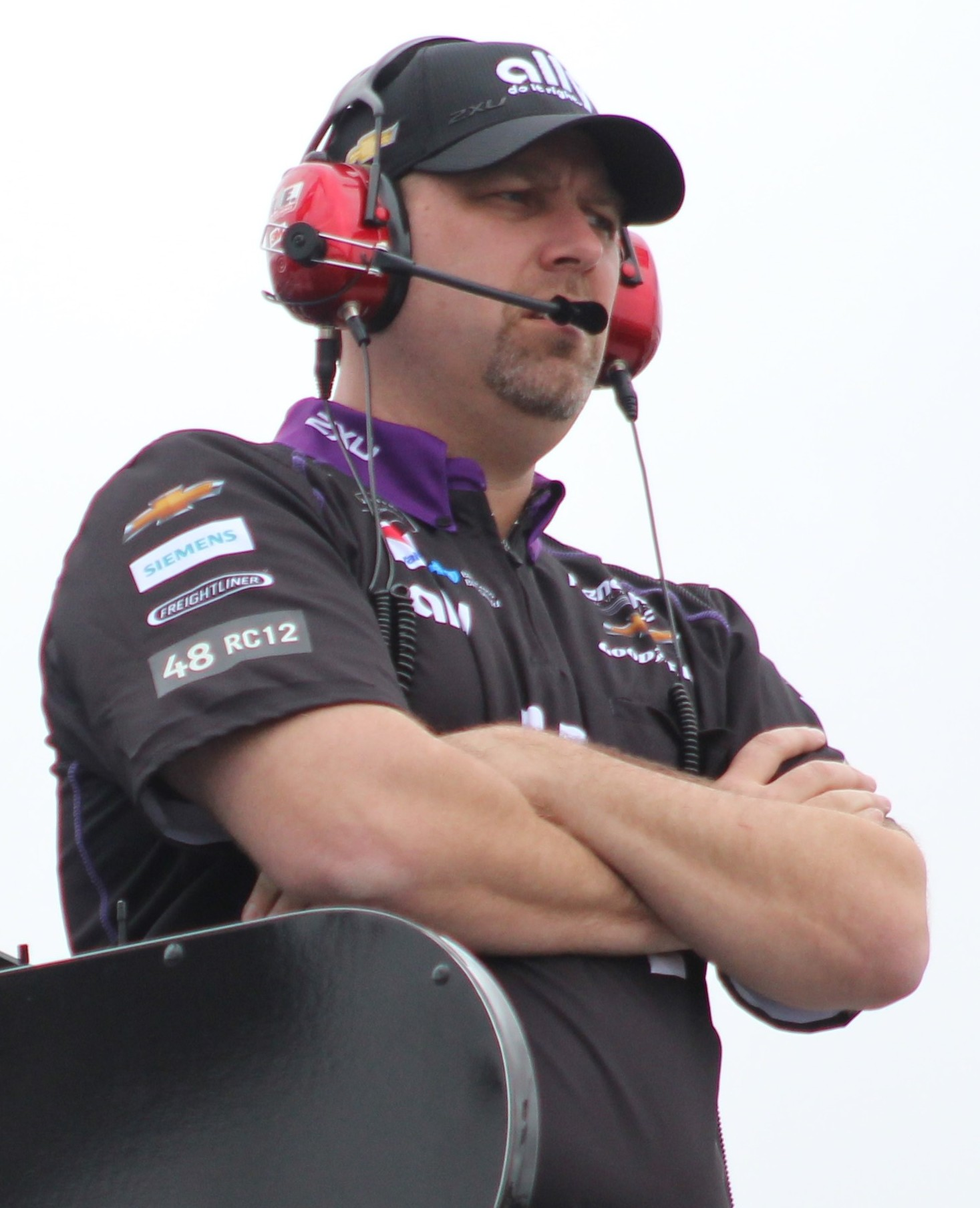
- Meendering at Daytona International Speedway in 2019

Personal information
- Born: Kevin John Meendering; March 17, 1981 (age 45) Grand Rapids, Michigan, U.S.
- Education: University of North Carolina
- Occupation: Crew chief
- Years active: 2008–present

Sport
- Country: United States
- Sport: Motor racing
- League: NASCAR Xfinity Series
- Team: 17. Hendrick Motorsports

Kevin John Meendering (born March 17, 1981) is an American NASCAR crew chief who works for Hendrick Motorsports. He most recently was the crew chief of the No. 17 Chevrolet Camaro in the 2023 NASCAR Xfinity Series, which was fielded part-time for Kyle Larson, Alex Bowman and William Byron.

== Racing career ==
=== 2016–2018: JR Motorsports ===
Meendering's first crew chief job came with JR Motorsports, who he worked for from 2016 to 2018 as the crew chief of their No. 1 Chevrolet driven by Elliott Sadler in the Xfinity Series.

=== 2019–present: Hendrick Motorsports ===
On October 10, 2018, it was announced that Hendrick Motorsports would split up the legendary driver/crew chief pair of Jimmie Johnson and Chad Knaus starting in 2019 after they had a dismal 2018 season. Meendering was announced as Johnson's new crew chief for 2019 and that Knaus would replace Darian Grubb (who moved into a technical director position for HMS) as the crew chief of Hendrick's No. 24 car driven by William Byron. On July 29, 2019, following a string of disappointing finishes during the 2019 season, Hendrick Motorsports announced that the No. 48 car's engineer, Cliff Daniels, would replace Meendering as the crew chief of the No. 48. Meendering would be moved to a different unspecified role at Hendrick after he was relieved of his crew chief job.

On June 2, 2022, Hendrick Motorsports announced that Meendering would return to crew chiefing for the first time since 2019 as he would be the crew chief of the team's new part-time Xfinity Series car, the No. 17. On June 20, HMS announced that Meendering would also serve as the interim crew chief for Kyle Larson's No. 5 car in the Cup Series after Cliff Daniels was suspended for four races (Nashville, Road America, Atlanta in July and New Hampshire) due to the car losing a tire and wheel during the race at Sonoma.

On March 8, 2023, Hendrick announced that Meendering would return to be the crew chief of their part-time Xfinity Series car, the No. 17, although this year he would share the job with Greg Ives, the former crew chief of their No. 48 car in the Cup Series. On March 16, Hendrick announced that Meendering would return to be the interim crew chief of their Cup Series No. 5 car as Daniels was suspended again for four races after the team's L2 penalty for illegally modified hood louvers.

== Personal life ==
Meendering's older brother, Jeff, is also a NASCAR crew chief. Jeff works for Joe Gibbs Racing in the Xfinity Series as the crew chief for their No. 18 car driven by William Sawalich. The Meendering brothers are from Marne, Michigan.
