= Jeremy Bullins =

American NASCAR crew chief (born 1977)

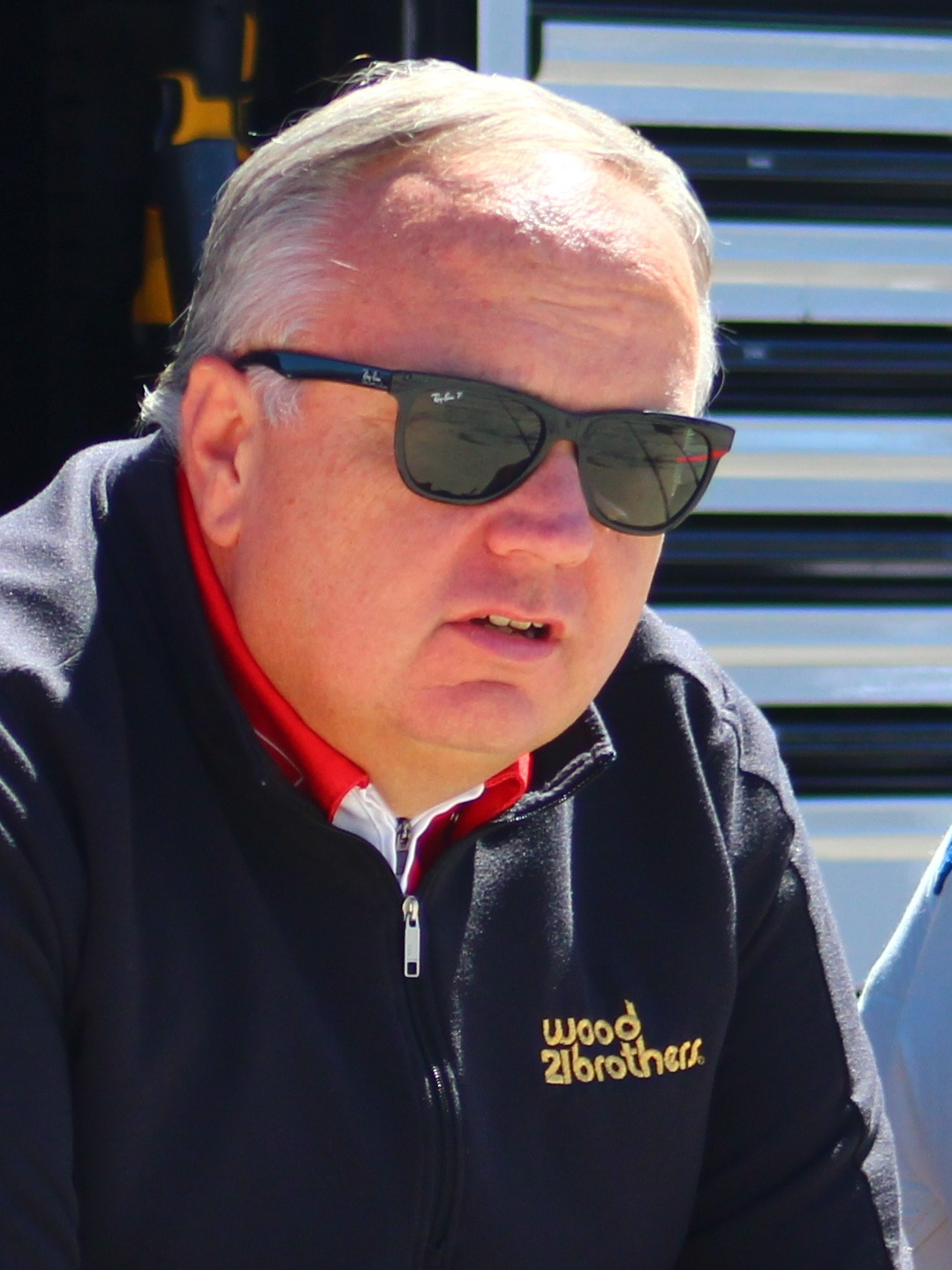
- Bullins at Martinsville Speedway in 2024

Personal information
- Born: Jeremiah Dallas Bullins; May 8, 1977 (age 49) Walnut Cove, North Carolina, U.S.

Sport
- Country: United States
- Sport: NASCAR Cup Series

Jeremiah Dallas Bullins (born May 8, 1977) is an American NASCAR crew chief who will work for Legacy Motor Club as the crew chief of their No. 84 Toyota Camry XSE driven by Riley Herbst in the NASCAR Cup Series.

Prior to crew chiefing in the Cup Series, Bullins crew chiefed for Team Penske in what is now the NASCAR Xfinity Series from 2012 to 2014. He previously worked for Wood Brothers Racing from 2015 to 2017, crew chiefing Ryan Blaney in the Cup Series part-time the first year and full-time the next two years before the two of them moved to Penske (which WBR has an alliance with) on their No. 12 car when the team expanded to three full-time Cup Series cars. He then moved to Penske's No. 2 car in 2020, crew chiefing Brad Keselowski that year (finishing second in the final standings) and in 2021, and continued to crew chief the No. 2 car when Austin Cindric became the driver in 2022. In their first race together, they won the 2022 Daytona 500. He then went back to the Wood Brothers in 2023 to crew chief the No. 21 car with Harrison Burton until late in the 2024 season when he announced his departure from the team.

== Racing career ==
=== 1999–2011: Pre-Penske years ===
After graduating college, Bullins began his career in NASCAR with Wood Brothers Racing in October 1999, whose No. 21 car was driven at the time by Elliott Sadler. After his time with the Wood Brothers, he would work in the Busch Series (later Nationwide) for ST Motorsports, which is now JTG Daugherty Racing. He would later leave that team for Robert Yates Racing. Before the 2005 season, Bullins joined Richard Childress Racing. During his time there, he worked as the engineer for Kevin Harvick and Clint Bowyer, and with those two drivers, he racked up a total of nine wins.

=== 2012–2014: Penske NNS No. 22 ===
Bullins was hired in December 2011 by Penske Racing to crew chief the No. 22 team in the Nationwide Series beginning in 2012. He replaced Todd Gordon, who was promoted to crew chief Penske's No. 22 team in the Cup Series after Steve Addington left for Stewart–Haas Racing to be defending series champion Tony Stewart's crew chief that year.

In his first year as crew chief for that team, he worked with Brad Keselowski, Parker Kligerman and Jacques Villeneuve. Kligerman would be released and replaced by Ryan Blaney for the rest of his part-time schedule in the car during the season. He earned three wins that season with Keselowski and came close to winning with the other two drivers as well, as Blaney finished second at Texas in November and Villeneuve finished third at Montreal after running out of fuel on the last lap and losing the lead he had held for most of the race. The team finished the year sixth in owner points.

For 2013, the team saw a notable uptick in performance. Bullins won at least one race with all four drivers of the No. 22 car that year. Keselowski scored six wins (up from three in 2012), and Blaney would earn his first win in the series at Kentucky in September. Also, Joey Logano, Penske's new full-time Cup Series driver, also ran 14 races in the No. 22 car (Keselowski and Blaney each reduced their schedules by a few races to make room for Logano to drive the car as well). Logano came to Penske from Joe Gibbs Racing at the start of the year, and he was instrumental in leading JGR's No. 18 car to the 2012 NNS owner's championship. A. J. Allmendinger replaced Villeneuve as the No. 22's driver for the standalone road course races of Road America and Mid-Ohio Sports Car Course (which replaced Montreal on the schedule), and would win both of them in dominating fashion. Logano would pick up three wins, which came at both Dover races plus Chicago in July. All of this success resulted in the team winning the 2013 owner's championship.

=== 2015–present: NASCAR Cup Series ===
==== 2015–2019: Ryan Blaney ====
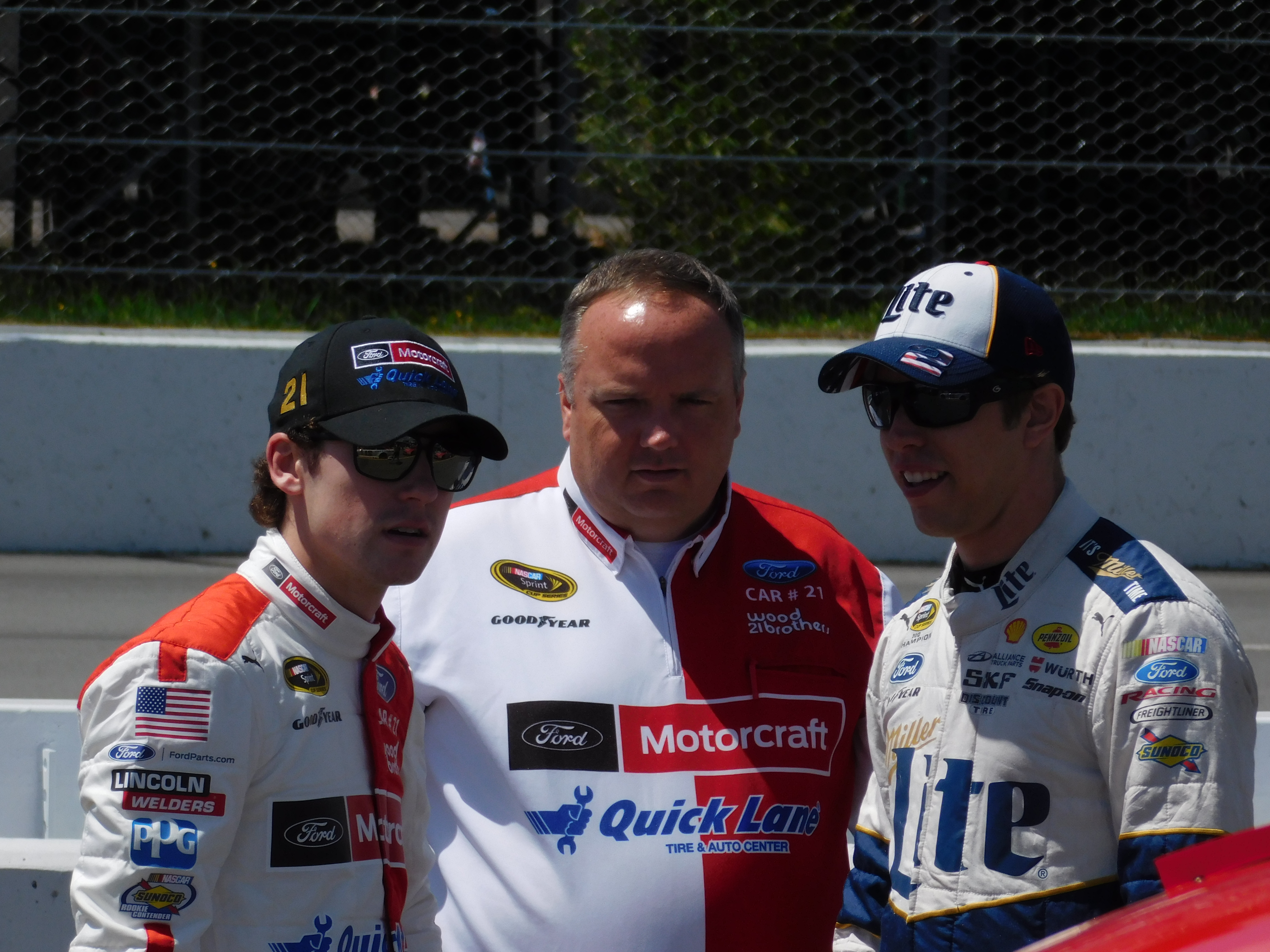
Bullins (middle) with Ryan Blaney (left) and Brad Keselowski at Pocono in 2016. Bullins has crew chiefed both drivers.

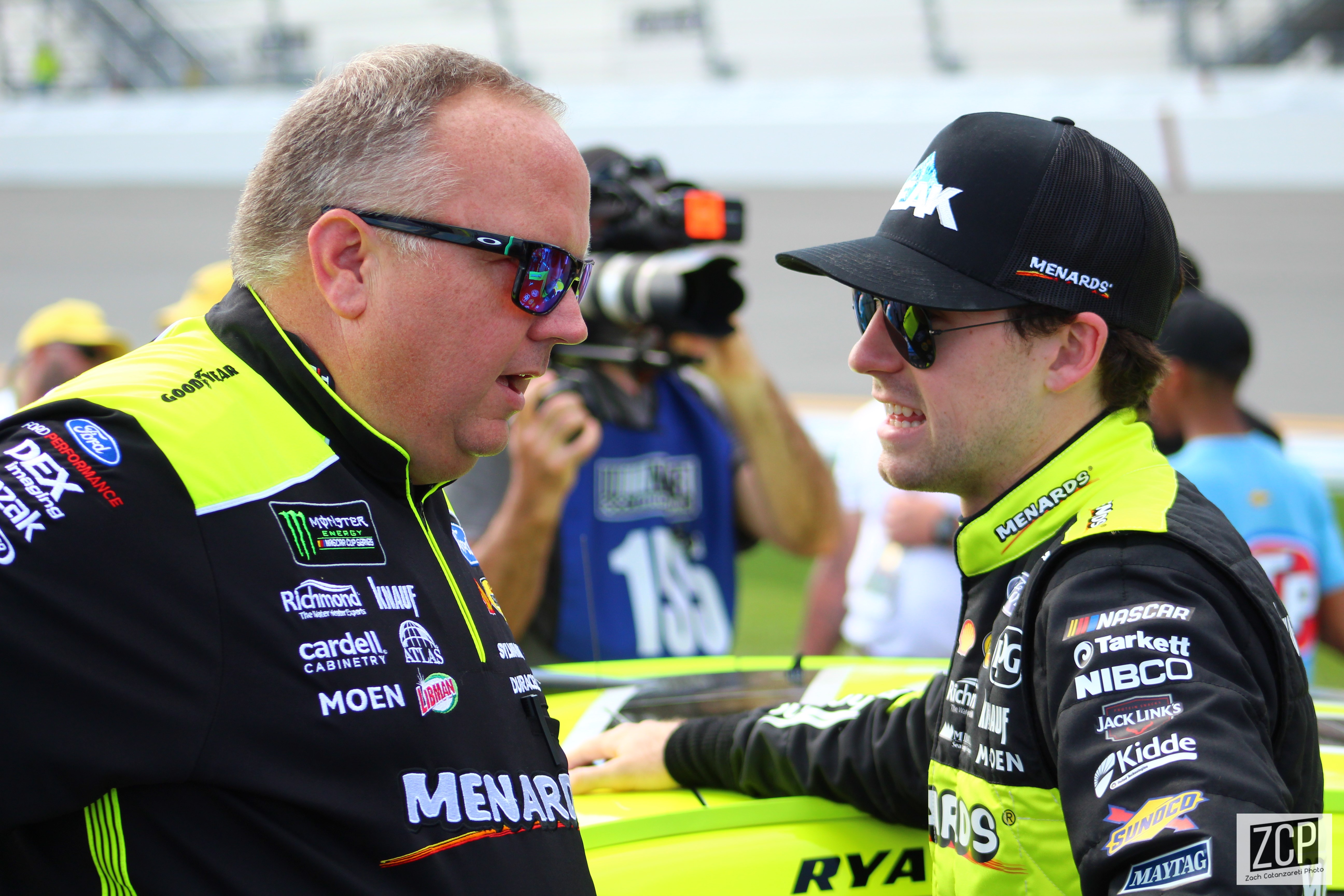
Bullins (left) and Ryan Blaney talking on pit road before the 2019 Daytona 500

Bullins returned to the Wood Brothers team in 2015. Now only a part-time team, the No. 21 car was driven by Blaney starting that year, replacing Trevor Bayne, who moved to Roush Fenway Racing to replace the departing Carl Edwards as a full-time driver on that team. WBR also switched from a Roush alliance to a Penske alliance starting in 2015, which is why Bullins was able to work for the team as he was still part of the Penske family. He had previously made his Cup Series crew chiefing debut on Penske's part time No. 12 car when Blaney drove it in his first two Cup races at Kansas and Talladega.

==== 2020–2024: Brad Keselowski, Austin Cindric and Harrison Burton ====
Despite even having a solid 2019 season, Penske announced a crew chief shakeup for the 2020 season in an effort to be more competitive and dominant like the successes Joe Gibbs Racing was having. During Bullins' time with the No. 12 of Ryan Blaney, the car was arguably the weakest in the Penske stable both years, and he was reassigned to Brad Keselowski's No. 2 team, replacing Paul Wolfe, who moved to Joey Logano's No. 22. Todd Gordon, who had been Logano's crew chief and was very much successful in that role, replaced Bullins as Blaney's crew chief on the No. 12.

The duo started the year off on a good note, and Keselowski led 30 laps in the Daytona 500 and 82 at Phoenix three races later. After the first four races, the season was halted for two months due to the coronavirus pandemic. Keselowski and Bullins won 4 races that year, including the 2020 Coca-Cola 600 and finished second in the final standings behind Chase Elliott.

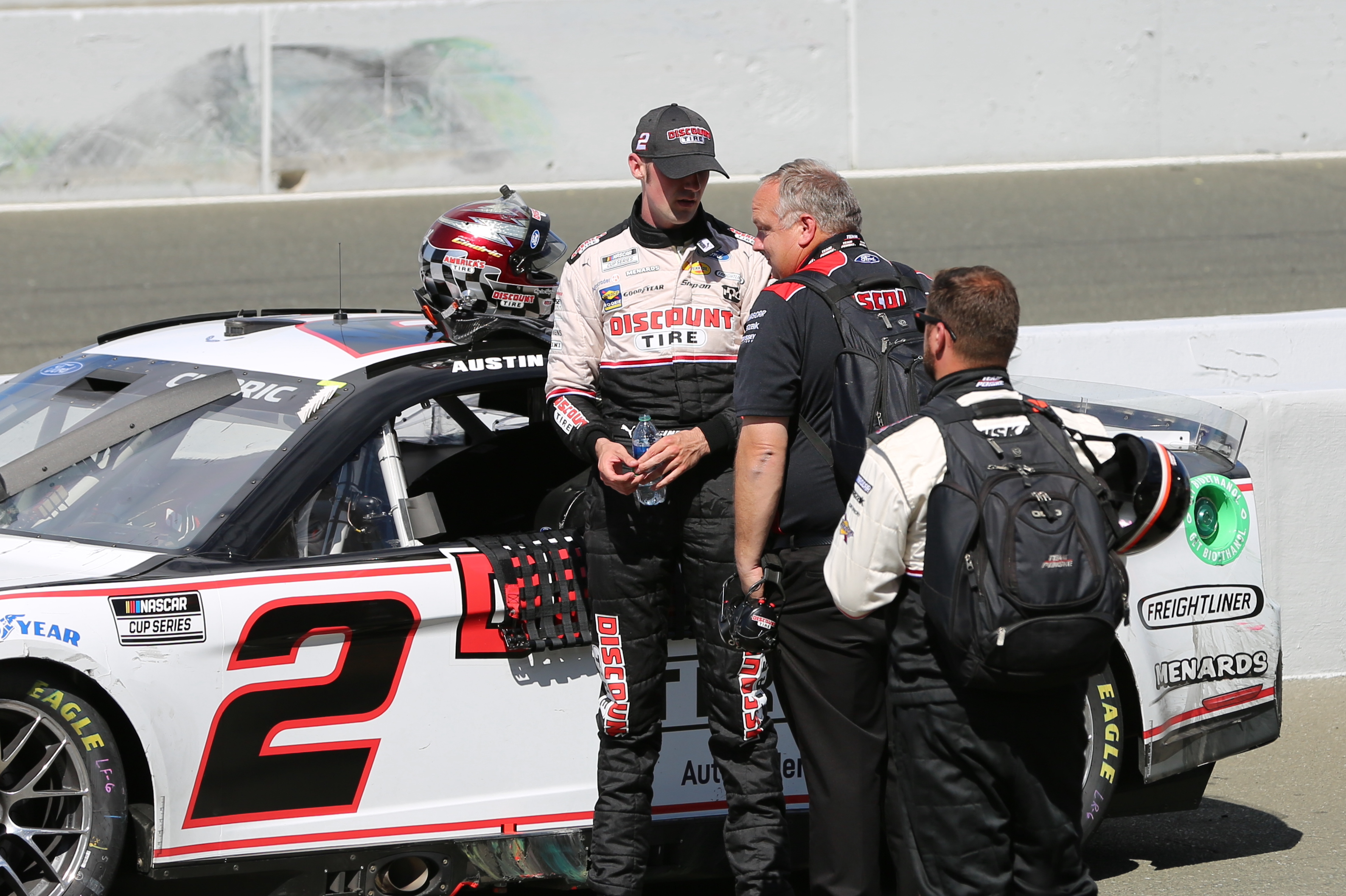
Bullins (in middle) and Austin Cindric (on left) talking on pit road after the 2022 Toyota/Save Mart 350 at Sonoma

In 2021, Keselowski finished sixth in the final standings and only won the race at Talladega in April. It was his last season with Penske before leaving for Roush Fenway Racing to become the driver of their No. 6 car as well as a co-owner of the team, which was renamed RFK Racing. Bullins would remain the crew chief of the No. 2 car in 2022 when Austin Cindric moved up from Penske's Xfinity Series No. 22 car to replace Keselowski. Cindric and Bullins won the 2022 Daytona 500. On July 20, Bullins was suspended for four races due to a tire and wheel loss during the 2022 Ambetter 301 at Loudon. Engineer Grant Hutchens would fill in for Bullins in these four races. He also previously filled in for Bullins in the Coca-Cola 600 when Bullins was sick.

After Cindric had a sophomore slump in 2023 and failed to qualify for the playoffs, and Harrison Burton, the driver of the Wood Brothers No. 21 car that year, also failed to qualify for the playoffs, Penske decided to move Bullins back to the Wood Brothers to be Burton's crew chief, switching cars with Brian Wilson, who moved from the WBR No. 21 car back in-house to Penske to crew chief Cindric and the No. 2 car. (Wilson and Cindric also previously won the 2020 NASCAR Xfinity Series championship together for Penske.)

After struggling throughout the 2024 season, Burton and the No. 21 won at the Daytona night race, scoring the Wood Brothers' 100th win and making the playoffs. The team was eliminated at the conclusion of the Round of 16 at the Bristol night race. On October 25, Bullins parted ways with WBR, with Grant Hutchens replacing him for the remainder of the season.

==== 2025–2026: RFK Racing ====
On November 21, 2024, it was announced that Bullins would reunite with Brad Keselowski at RFK Racing, crew chiefing him on the No. 6 car in 2025, replacing Matt McCall.

On September 21, 2026, it was announced that Bullins would be parting ways with RFK Racing.

== Personal life ==
Bullins is a 1995 graduate of South Stokes High School and then attended North Carolina State University, studying Mechanical Engineering. He is from Walnut Cove, North Carolina, and lives in China Grove, North Carolina today with his wife Tina.
