= Keith Rodden =

American stock car racing crew chief

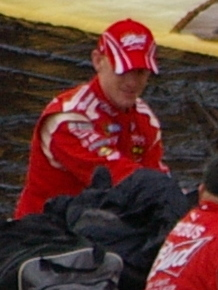
- Rodden in 2009

Personal information
- Born: Keith Matthew Rodden; March 27, 1981 (age 45) Denver, North Carolina, U.S.

Sport
- Country: United States
- Sport: NASCAR Cup Series
- Team: Richard Childress Racing

Keith Matthew Rodden (born March 27, 1981) is an American stock car racing crew chief who works for Richard Childress Racing in an administrative role. He previously served as a crew chief for RCR on Austin Dillon's No. 3 Chevrolet Camaro ZL1 in the NASCAR Cup Series. He also previously crew chiefed in the Cup Series for Chip Ganassi Racing on Jamie McMurray's No. 1 car in 2014 and then for Hendrick Motorsports on Kasey Kahne's No. 5 car from 2015 to 2017 and also worked for Chevrolet in their motorsports division.

== Racing career ==
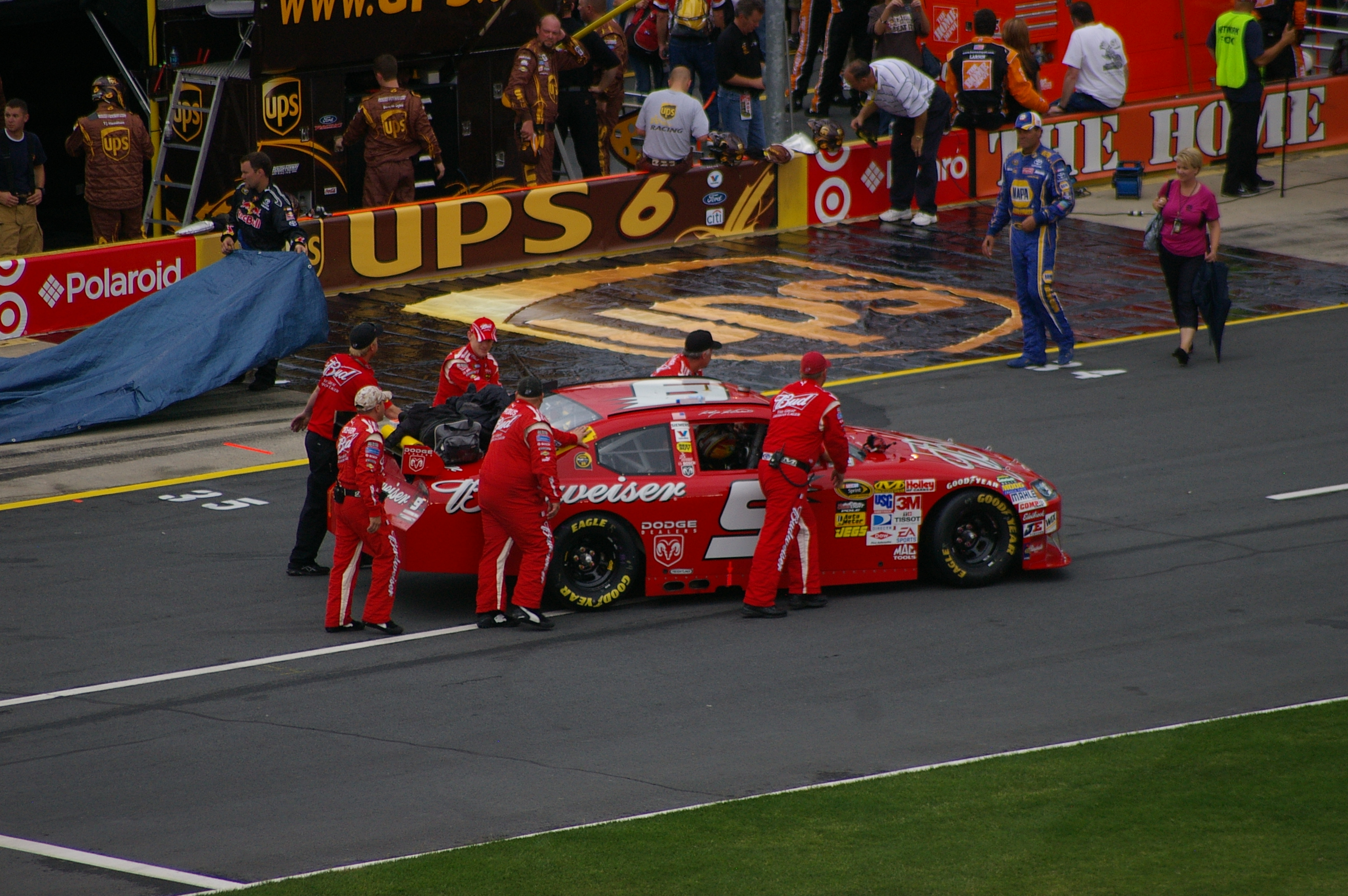
Rodden (behind the No. 9 car wearing the red Budweiser hat) and other members of Kasey Kahne's pit crew pushing their car down pit road during the 2009 Coca-Cola 600 rain delay

A native of Denver, North Carolina, and a graduate of North Carolina State University, Rodden has worked as an engineer in the NASCAR Sprint Cup Series for Andy Petree Racing, Gillett Evernham Motorsports, Richard Petty Motorsports, Red Bull Racing and Hendrick Motorsports.

In November 2013, Rodden was announced as the new crew chief for Chip Ganassi Racing's No. 1 Chevrolet, starting with the 2014 NASCAR Sprint Cup Series season.

A year later, Rodden was announced as the crew chief for Hendrick Motorsports's No. 5 Chevrolet starting in 2015. Working with Kasey Kahne, the two won the 2017 Brantley Gilbert Big Machine Brickyard 400, though Rodden was replaced by Darian Grubb later in the year.

In July 2020, Rodden substituted for Chad Knaus as crew chief for William Byron on the 24 car for the Super Start Batteries 400. Byron finished the race in tenth position while also leading 27 laps mainly due to a strategy call.

Rodden would later leave Hendrick to work for Chevrolet and General Motors in their motorsports division as part of their NASCAR competition and strategy group. On October 28, 2022, it was announced that Rodden would return to being a crew chief in 2023 as the new crew chief for Richard Childress Racing's No. 3 car, driven by Austin Dillon. He replaced Justin Alexander, who would become RCR's director of vehicle performance.

Following the 2023 NOCO 400 at Martinsville, the No. 3 was served an L1 penalty after NASCAR's R&D Center discovered an unapproved underwing assembly during post-inspection. As a result, the team was docked 60 driver and owner points and five playoff points. In addition, Rodden was fined US$75,000 and suspended for two races.

After a disappointing 2023 season that resulted in Dillon not winning any races, missing the playoffs and finishing 29th in the final standings (the worst points finish in all his years running full-time in the Cup Series) and the start of the 2024 season not going much better, RCR moved Justin Alexander back into the crew chief position for Dillon and the No. 3 team on April 2, 2024. Rodden was moved into a different job overseeing the entire organization's teams, similar to Alexander's previous position as competition director (which he was promoted to in November 2023), although a specific job title for Rodden was not publicly announced.

On April 5, 2024, It was announced that Rodden would crew chief the No. 33 car which is being driven by Austin Hill.
