= Greg Ives =

American NASCAR crew chief

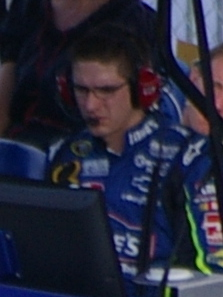
- Ives during the 2008 Daytona 500

Personal information
- Full name: Gregory Stuart Ives
- Born: September 13, 1979 (age 46) Bark River, Michigan, U.S.
- Education: Michigan Technological University
- Occupation: Crew Chief
- Years active: 2013–present

Sport
- Country: United States
- Sport: Motor racing
- League: NASCAR Cup Series
- Team: 40. JR Motorsports

Gregory Stuart Ives (born September 13, 1979) is an American NASCAR crew chief who works for JR Motorsports as the crew chief of their No. 40 Chevrolet ZL1 in the NASCAR Cup Series, which is fielded part-time for Justin Allgaier. He has previously served as the crew chief for Hendrick Motorsports's No. 17 Chevrolet SS driven by Corey Day in the NASCAR Xfinity Series.

== Racing career ==
=== Hendrick Motorsports ===
In 2016, Ives was the crew chief for Hendrick Motorsports No. 88 car, driven by Jeff Gordon (temporarily in 2016), Dale Earnhardt Jr. (permanently from 2015 to 2017), and Alex Bowman (and permanently from 2018 to 2020). Ives won three races with Earnhardt Jr. Prior to that, he crew chiefed for Earnhardt Jr's Xfinity Series team, JR Motorsports, in 2013 on Regan Smith's No. 7 car and 2014 on Chase Elliott's No. 9 car. He and Elliott won the 2014 championship together. After graduating from Michigan Technological University in 2003, Ives worked for Hendrick Motorsports from 2004 to 2012 as a mechanic and later the engineer for the No. 48 car driven by Jimmie Johnson. He was part of the car's pit crew when Johnson won his five consecutive championships between 2006 and 2010.

In 2021, Ives remained the crew chief for Bowman, who moved from the No. 88 car to the No. 48 vacated by Jimmie Johnson's retirement. (Hendrick dropped that car number after the 2020 season in order to bring back the No. 5, which was driven by Kyle Larson, who replaced Johnson in Hendrick's driver lineup.)

On August 26, 2022, Ives announced that he would step down as crew chief for Bowman at the end of the 2022 season and take another job at Hendrick Motorsports that would allow him to spend more time with his family. On October 14, it was announced that Blake Harris, the crew chief for Michael McDowell's No. 34 car for Front Row Motorsports, would replace Ives as Bowman's crew chief in 2023.

On March 8, 2023, Hendrick announced that Ives would return to crew chiefing part-time in 2023 as one of two crew chiefs for their part-time Xfinity Series car, the No. 17, sharing the job with Kevin Meendering. On March 16, Hendrick announced that Ives would return to be the interim crew chief of their Cup Series No. 48 car as Blake Harris (who replaced Ives as the permanent crew chief of the car in 2023) was suspended for four races after the team's L2 penalty for illegally modified hood louvers.

=== 2025: JR Motorsports ===
On January 15, 2025, it was announced that Ives would crew chief the JR Motorsports No. 40 at the 2025 Daytona 500 with Justin Allgaier.
