= Alan Gustafson =

NASCAR crew chief

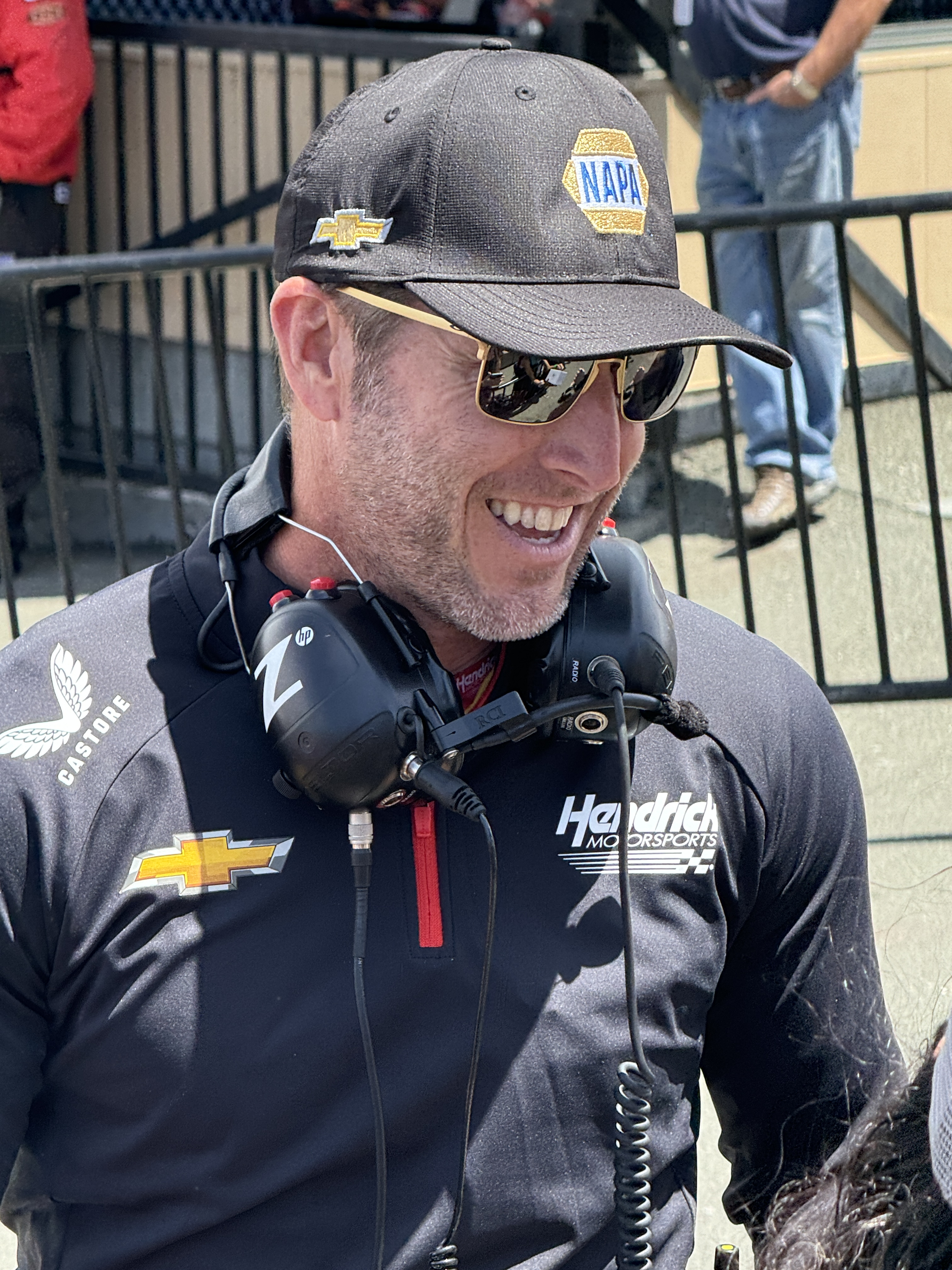
- Gustafson at Sonoma Raceway in 2024

Personal information
- Born: Alan Arthur Gustafson; August 5, 1975 (age 50) Ormond Beach, Florida, U.S.

Sport
- Country: United States
- Sport: NASCAR Cup Series
- Team: 9. Hendrick Motorsports

Alan Arthur Gustafson (born August 5, 1975) is an American NASCAR Cup Series crew chief who works for Hendrick Motorsports as the crew chief of their No. 9 Chevrolet Camaro ZL1 driven by Chase Elliott in the NASCAR Cup Series. He and Elliott won the 2020 NASCAR Cup Series championship together.

Gustafson was previously the crew chief of Hendrick's No. 24 car from 2011 to 2017, working with Jeff Gordon from 2011 until his retirement in 2015 and then Elliott in 2016 and 2017. Prior to that, he crew chiefed Hendrick's No. 5 car from 2005 to 2010, working with Kyle Busch from 2005 to 2007, Casey Mears in 2008 and Mark Martin in 2009 and 2010. Prior to that, he was the engineer and shock specialist for the No. 5 car, an engineer for former Xfinity Series teams Blaise Alexander Racing and Diamond Ridge Motorsports as well as former Truck Series team Arrington Racing.

== Racing career ==
=== Early career ===
Born on August 5, 1975, in Ormond Beach, Florida, Gustafson began his racing career at the age of eight helping his childhood friend, Casey Yunick, race go-karts. As Yunick and him grew older, they began racing late models and legends cars on local race tracks. Afterward, he helped another one of his friends by working on their Sports Car Club of America series cars. Once he graduated Seabreeze High School, he continued his education by attending Embry-Riddle Aeronautical University for a mechanical engineering degree and was a member of Kappa Sigma. Even though he was attending college, he continued to help his friends with racing. In 1996, he came to a decision of continuing college, or moving to North Carolina to continue his racing career. He decided to move to North Carolina to work on Gary Moore's Goody's Dash Series team (GEM Motorsports), with his longtime friend, Jimmy Foster. He was chosen as the crew chief, while Foster raced. He was also performing engineering duties for the team. Once the 1996 season ended, they recorded one win, along with finishing sixth in the point standings.

=== 1997–2004: Engineer ===
In 1997, he left the team after becoming the crew chief of Andy Houston's Late Model Stock Car and NASCAR Craftsman Truck Series team, which was owned by Addington Racing. Gustafson won several races in the Late Model Stock Car Series, while they only participated in a few Truck Series events. One year later he became team engineer for Diamond Ridge Motorsports in the Busch Series (now NASCAR O'Reilly Auto Parts Series). While at the team, he recorded several pole positions and wins. In 1999, he left the team to help his friend Foster in the Busch Series, which they only qualified for one race, which they finished 34th. Afterward, Gustafson was employed at Hendrick Motorsports to become the 5 car's shock specialist. While there, the team earned three top-five finishes and six top-tens. One year later, with Terry Labonte the driver, the team recorded one top-five and three top-tens, as Gustafson remained the shock specialist.

In 2002, he became the lead engineer for the 5 car. He remained the same for the next three years, which he collected one victory at Darlington Raceway, five top-fives and 19 top-tens.

=== 2005–present: Crew chief ===
==== 2005–2010: Hendrick No. 5 car ====
Before the 2005 season, he was announced as the crew chief for the 5 car, driven by Kyle Busch. In the same year, the team won the pole position for the second race of the season, as well as one victory and a 20th place points finish. During the 2006 and 2007 seasons, he recorded at least one win in each of the seasons, two Chase for the Sprint Cup appearances, with a best points finish of fifth in 2007. In 2009, Mark Martin became the driver for the team. In the season, they recorded five wins, and a second-place finish in points. Martin remained the driver in 2010.

==== 2011–2017: Hendrick No. 24 car ====
For the 2011 season, Rick Hendrick switched around crew chiefs on his teams. Gustafson was reassigned to Jeff Gordon's team, Gordon's previous crew chief Steve Letarte was moved to Dale Earnhardt Jr.'s team, and Lance McGrew moved from the No. 88 to replace Gustafson as Martin's crew chief. Over the course of the 2011 season, Gustafson helped Gordon back to victory lane three times at Phoenix, Pocono, and Atlanta. Gordon tied Cale Yarborough's 83 win mark at Phoenix, putting him fifth on NASCAR's All-Time Win List. Bobby Allison's and Darrell Waltrip's record of 84 wins for third all time was passed as Gordon solely became number 3 with his 85th win at Atlanta. Gustafson also helped Gordon to the 2011 Chase and finished 8th in the final point standings. In five seasons together, Gustafson and Gordon won 11 races, recorded 51 top-fives and 97 top-tens.

In 2016, Gustafson began serving as Chase Elliott's crew chief. They finished the 2016 and 2017 seasons without scoring a win in the No. 24 car.

==== 2018–present: Hendrick No. 9 car ====
In 2018, Hendrick acquired the No. 9, a longtime Elliott family number, from Richard Petty Motorsports (who had switched their No. 9 car to the No. 44 starting in 2016), and Elliott and Gustafson moved over to the No. 9 car while rookie William Byron would drive the No. 24 car. Byron replaced Kasey Kahne as a driver on Hendrick's Cup Series team, and the team stopped using the No. 5, which was the number Kahne had driven. After numerous second place finishes in his first two full seasons in the Cup Series, Elliott finally won his first Cup Series race in the race at Watkins Glen. He and Gustafson would win two more races that year, three races in 2019, five races and the championship in 2020, two races in 2021 and five races in 2022.

In 2021, Gustafson was suspended for the race at Watkins Glen after the No. 9 car failed pre-race inspection due to an illegal rear window air deflector. Tom Gray, the engineer of the No. 9 car, would fill in for Gustafson as the interim crew chief in the race.

In 2023, Elliott was injured in a snowboarding accident in Colorado prior to the race at Las Vegas and was replaced for the next several races by JR Motorsports Xfinity Series driver Josh Berry except for the race at COTA where IMSA driver Jordan Taylor made his NASCAR debut subbing for Elliott. After the race at Phoenix, each of the Hendrick cars would receive an L2 penalty (a four-race crew chief suspension and the loss of 100 driver and owner points) after NASCAR discovered illegally modified hood louvers on the cars during practice for the race. Engineer Tom Gray would fill in again as the interim crew chief for the No. 9 car for four races.
