= 2022 M&M's Fan Appreciation 400 =

NASCAR Cup Series race

Race details
- Race 21 of 36 in the 2022 NASCAR Cup Series
- Date: July 24, 2022
- Location: Pocono Raceway in Long Pond, Pennsylvania
- Course: Permanent racing facility
- Course length: 2.5 miles (4 km)
- Distance: 160 laps, 400 mi (640 km)
- Average speed: 122.459 miles per hour (197.079 km/h)

Pole position
Driver	Denny Hamlin	Joe Gibbs Racing
- Time: 52.944

Most laps led
Driver	Kyle Busch	Joe Gibbs Racing
- Laps: 63

Winner
No. 9	Chase Elliott	Hendrick Motorsports

Television in the United States
- Network: USA
- Announcers: Rick Allen, Jeff Burton, Steve Letarte, and Dale Earnhardt Jr.

Radio in the United States
- Radio: MRN
- Booth announcers: Alex Hayden, Jeff Striegle, and Todd Gordon
- Turn announcers: Dave Moody (1), Mike Bagley (2) and Kyle Rickey (3)

The 2022 M&M's Fan Appreciation 400 was a NASCAR Cup Series race that was held on July 24, 2022, at Pocono Raceway in Long Pond, Pennsylvania. Contested over 160 laps on the 2.5-mile (4.0 km) speedway, it was the 21st race of the 2022 NASCAR Cup Series season. Chase Elliott of Hendrick Motorsports would win the race after Denny Hamlin and Kyle Busch, who originally finished first and second respectively, were both disqualified for failing post-race technical inspection. Elliott became the first NASCAR driver to win a race after both the original first and second-place finishers were disqualified since 1955. Hamlin was also the first NASCAR Cup Series race winner to be disqualified since 1960, ending a 62-year streak. It was also the first disqualification of the Next Gen car since its debut earlier that year.

It was the final appearance of 2004 Cup Series champion Kurt Busch, who withdrew from the race after crashing in qualifying, eventually leading to his retirement the following year.

== Report ==
=== Background ===
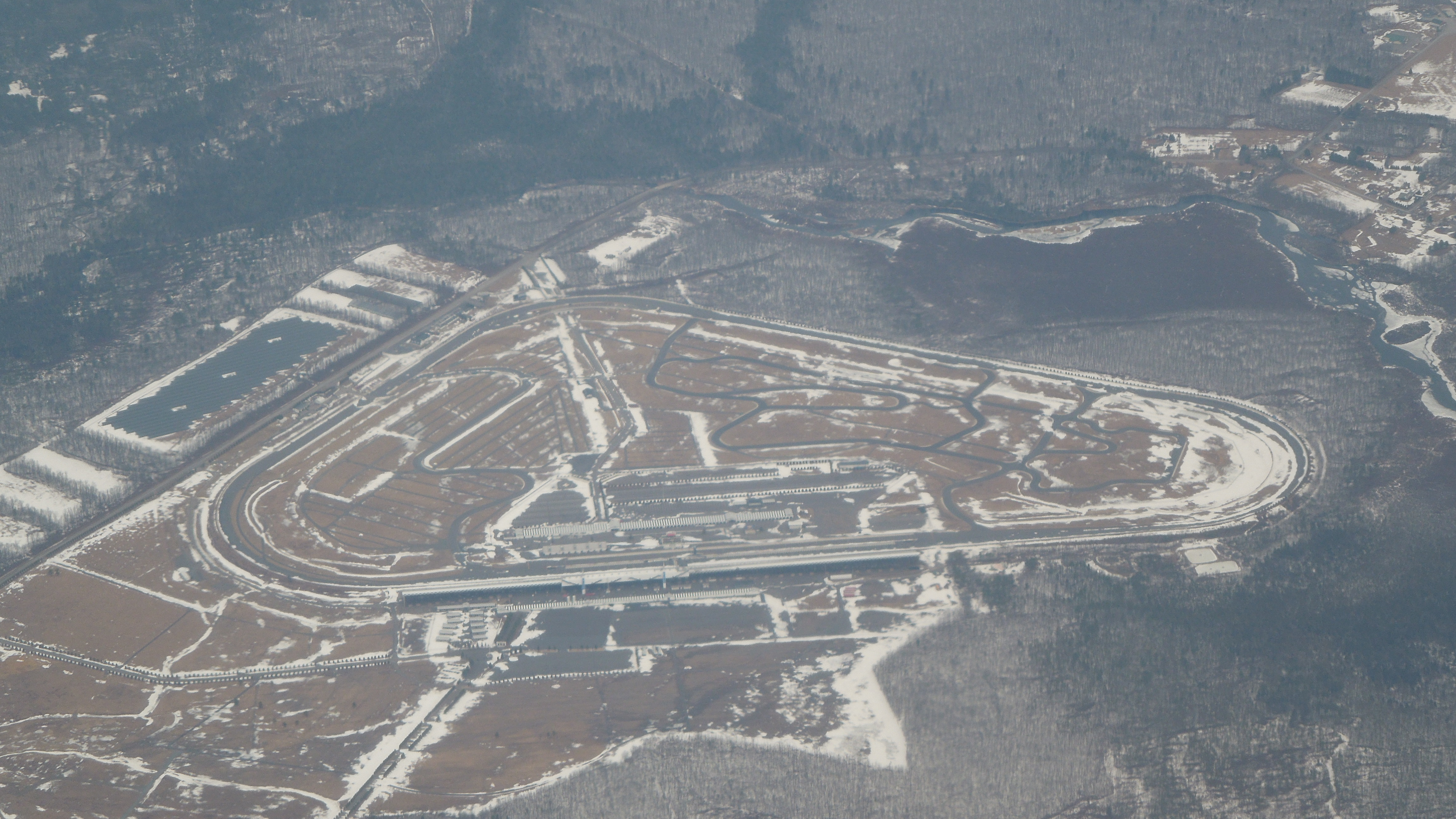
Pocono Raceway, the track where the race was held.

Pocono Raceway is a 2.5-mile (4.0 km) oval speedway located in Long Pond, Pennsylvania, which has hosted NASCAR racing annually since the early 1970s. Nicknamed "The Tricky Triangle", the speedway has three distinct corners and is known for high speeds along its lengthy straightaways.

From 1982 to 2019, the circuit had two race weekends. In 2020, the circuit was reduced to one race meeting of two races. The first race was moved to World Wide Technology Raceway near St. Louis starting in 2022.

==== Entry list ====
- (R) denotes rookie driver.
- (i) denotes driver who is ineligible for series driver points.

No.	Driver	Team	Manufacturer
1	Ross Chastain	Trackhouse Racing Team	Chevrolet
2	Austin Cindric (R)	Team Penske	Ford
3	Austin Dillon	Richard Childress Racing	Chevrolet
4	Kevin Harvick	Stewart-Haas Racing	Ford
5	Kyle Larson	Hendrick Motorsports	Chevrolet
6	Brad Keselowski	RFK Racing	Ford
7	Corey LaJoie	Spire Motorsports	Chevrolet
8	Tyler Reddick	Richard Childress Racing	Chevrolet
9	Chase Elliott	Hendrick Motorsports	Chevrolet
10	Aric Almirola	Stewart-Haas Racing	Ford
11	Denny Hamlin	Joe Gibbs Racing	Toyota
12	Ryan Blaney	Team Penske	Ford
14	Chase Briscoe	Stewart-Haas Racing	Ford
15	J. J. Yeley (i)	Rick Ware Racing	Ford
16	Noah Gragson (i)	Kaulig Racing	Chevrolet
17	Chris Buescher	RFK Racing	Ford
18	Kyle Busch	Joe Gibbs Racing	Toyota
19	Martin Truex Jr.	Joe Gibbs Racing	Toyota
20	Christopher Bell	Joe Gibbs Racing	Toyota
21	Harrison Burton (R)	Wood Brothers Racing	Ford
22	Joey Logano	Team Penske	Ford
23	Bubba Wallace	23XI Racing	Toyota
24	William Byron	Hendrick Motorsports	Chevrolet
31	Justin Haley	Kaulig Racing	Chevrolet
34	Michael McDowell	Front Row Motorsports	Ford
38	Todd Gilliland (R)	Front Row Motorsports	Ford
41	Cole Custer	Stewart-Haas Racing	Ford
42	Ty Dillon	Petty GMS Motorsports	Chevrolet
43	Erik Jones	Petty GMS Motorsports	Chevrolet
45	Kurt Busch	23XI Racing	Toyota
47	Ricky Stenhouse Jr.	JTG Daugherty Racing	Chevrolet
48	Alex Bowman	Hendrick Motorsports	Chevrolet
51	Cody Ware	Rick Ware Racing	Ford
77	Josh Bilicki (i)	Spire Motorsports	Chevrolet
78	B. J. McLeod (i)	Live Fast Motorsports	Ford
99	Daniel Suárez	Trackhouse Racing Team	Chevrolet
Official entry list

== Practice ==
Ross Chastain was the fastest in the practice session with a time of 53.661 seconds and a speed of 167.720 mph (269.919 km/h).

=== Practice results ===
Pos	No.	Driver	Team	Manufacturer	Time	Speed
1	1	Ross Chastain	Trackhouse Racing Team	Chevrolet	53.661	167.720
2	20	Christopher Bell	Joe Gibbs Racing	Toyota	53.688	167.635
3	99	Daniel Suárez	Trackhouse Racing Team	Chevrolet	53.781	167.345
Official practice results

== Qualifying ==
Denny Hamlin scored the pole for the race with a time of 52.944 and a speed of 169.991 mph (273.574 km/h).

During the second round of qualifying, Kurt Busch spun and the car made tail to wall contact to the Turn 3 wall. After further checkups on Sunday morning, he was medically disqualified and thereby suspended under a medical suspension that resulted in what became a career-ending injury, announcing his formal retirement on August 26, 2023. Ty Gibbs took over the 45 car for the remainder of the regular season.

=== Qualifying results ===
Pos	No.	Driver	Team	Manufacturer	R1	R2
1	11	Denny Hamlin	Joe Gibbs Racing	Toyota	53.145	52.944
2	18	Kyle Busch	Joe Gibbs Racing	Toyota	53.173	53.098
3	9	Chase Elliott	Hendrick Motorsports	Chevrolet	53.237	53.140
4	5	Kyle Larson	Hendrick Motorsports	Chevrolet	53.532	53.250
5	17	Chris Buescher	RFK Racing	Ford	53.522	53.279
6	12	Ryan Blaney	Team Penske	Ford	53.601	53.457
7	23	Bubba Wallace	23XI Racing	Toyota	53.410	53.472
8	19	Martin Truex Jr.	Joe Gibbs Racing	Toyota	53.577	53.579
9	99	Daniel Suárez	Trackhouse Racing Team	Chevrolet	53.473	53.590
10	45	Kurt Busch (Note: Kurt Busch was medically disqualified following a crash in Turn 3 on his warmup lap in the second round following a NASCAR evaluation the next day. Ty Gibbs took over the 45 car following the disqualification.)	23XI Racing	Toyota	53.444	0.000
11	20	Christopher Bell	Joe Gibbs Racing	Toyota	53.550	—
12	10	Aric Almirola	Stewart-Haas Racing	Ford	53.620	—
13	14	Chase Briscoe	Stewart-Haas Racing	Ford	53.655	—
14	22	Joey Logano	Team Penske	Ford	53.669	—
15	3	Austin Dillon	Richard Childress Racing	Chevrolet	53.678	—
16	8	Tyler Reddick	Richard Childress Racing	Chevrolet	53.708	—
17	48	Alex Bowman	Hendrick Motorsports	Chevrolet	53.834	—
18	24	William Byron	Hendrick Motorsports	Chevrolet	53.835	—
19	47	Ricky Stenhouse Jr.	JTG Daugherty Racing	Chevrolet	53.878	—
20	2	Austin Cindric (R)	Team Penske	Ford	53.921	—
21	1	Ross Chastain	Trackhouse Racing Team	Chevrolet	53.984	—
22	16	Noah Gragson (R)	Kaulig Racing	Chevrolet	54.000	—
23	7	Corey LaJoie	Spire Motorsports	Chevrolet	54.009	—
24	4	Kevin Harvick	Stewart-Haas Racing	Ford	54.020	—
25	34	Michael McDowell	Front Row Motorsports	Ford	54.049	—
26	6	Brad Keselowski	RFK Racing	Ford	54.061	—
27	42	Ty Dillon	Petty GMS Motorsports	Chevrolet	54.140	—
28	21	Harrison Burton (R)	Wood Brothers Racing	Ford	54.197	—
29	38	Todd Gilliland (R)	Front Row Motorsports	Ford	54.221	—
30	31	Justin Haley	Kaulig Racing	Chevrolet	54.440	—
31	77	Josh Bilicki (i)	Spire Motorsports	Chevrolet	54.639	—
32	41	Cole Custer	Stewart-Haas Racing	Ford	54.763	—
33	15	J. J. Yeley (i)	Rick Ware Racing	Ford	54.769	—
34	43	Erik Jones	Petty GMS Motorsports	Chevrolet	54.816	—
35	78	B. J. McLeod (i)	Live Fast Motorsports	Ford	55.625	—
36	51	Cody Ware	Rick Ware Racing	Ford	56.166	—
Official qualifying results

== Race ==
=== Stage Results ===
Stage One Laps: 30

Pos	No	Driver	Team	Manufacturer	Points
1	5	Kyle Larson	Hendrick Motorsports	Chevrolet	10
2	9	Chase Elliott	Hendrick Motorsports	Chevrolet	9
3	99	Daniel Suárez	Trackhouse Racing Team	Chevrolet	8
4	12	Ryan Blaney	Team Penske	Ford	7
5	43	Erik Jones	Petty GMS Motorsports	Chevrolet	6
6	24	William Byron	Hendrick Motorsports	Chevrolet	5
7	19	Martin Truex Jr.	Joe Gibbs Racing	Toyota	4
8	4	Kevin Harvick	Stewart-Haas Racing	Ford	3
9	7	Corey LaJoie	Spire Motorsports	Chevrolet	2
10	34	Michael McDowell	Front Row Motorsports	Ford	1
Official stage one results

Stage Two Laps: 65

Pos	No	Driver	Team	Manufacturer	Points
1	1	Ross Chastain	Trackhouse Racing Team	Chevrolet	10
2	12	Ryan Blaney	Team Penske	Ford	9
3	43	Erik Jones	Petty GMS Motorsports	Chevrolet	8
4	4	Kevin Harvick	Stewart-Haas Racing	Ford	7
5	24	William Byron	Hendrick Motorsports	Chevrolet	6
6	99	Daniel Suárez	Trackhouse Racing Team	Chevrolet	5
7	9	Chase Elliott	Hendrick Motorsports	Chevrolet	4
8	5	Kyle Larson	Hendrick Motorsports	Chevrolet	3
9	20	Christopher Bell	Joe Gibbs Racing	Toyota	2
10	19	Martin Truex Jr.	Joe Gibbs Racing	Toyota	1
Official stage two results

=== Final Stage Results ===
Stage Three Laps: 65

Pos	Grid	No	Driver	Team	Manufacturer	Laps	Points
1	3	9	Chase Elliott	Hendrick Motorsports	Chevrolet	160	53
2	16	8	Tyler Reddick	Richard Childress Racing	Chevrolet	160	35
3	9	99	Daniel Suárez	Trackhouse Racing Team	Chevrolet	160	47
4	11	20	Christopher Bell	Joe Gibbs Racing	Toyota	160	35
5	4	5	Kyle Larson	Hendrick Motorsports	Chevrolet	160	45
6	25	34	Michael McDowell (Note: McDowell was docked 100 points after NASCAR discovered illegal modifications to his car during the R&D Center inspection.)	Front Row Motorsports	Ford	160	-68
7	8	19	Martin Truex Jr.	Joe Gibbs Racing	Toyota	160	35
8	7	23	Bubba Wallace	23XI Racing	Toyota	160	29
9	34	43	Erik Jones (Note: Erik Jones and Ty Dillon were docked 35 points after their rocker box vent holes failed pre-race inspection.)	Petty GMS Motorsports	Chevrolet	160	7
10	15	3	Austin Dillon	Richard Childress Racing	Chevrolet	160	27
11	17	48	Alex Bowman	Hendrick Motorsports	Chevrolet	160	26
12	18	24	William Byron	Hendrick Motorsports	Chevrolet	160	36
13	12	10	Aric Almirola	Stewart-Haas Racing	Ford	160	24
14	26	6	Brad Keselowski	RFK Racing	Ford	160	23
15	13	14	Chase Briscoe	Stewart-Haas Racing	Ford	160	22
16	10	45	Ty Gibbs (i) (Note: Following Kurt Busch's medical disqualification (concussion) during the second round of qualifying, Ty Gibbs drove the No. 45 23XI Toyota in his place.)	23XI Racing	Toyota	160	0
17	32	41	Cole Custer	Stewart-Haas Racing	Ford	160	20
18	19	47	Ricky Stenhouse Jr.	JTG Daugherty Racing	Chevrolet	160	19
19	23	7	Corey LaJoie	Spire Motorsports	Chevrolet	160	20
20	14	22	Joey Logano	Team Penske	Ford	160	17
21	30	31	Justin Haley	Kaulig Racing	Chevrolet	160	16
22	27	42	Ty Dillon	Petty GMS Motorsports	Chevrolet	160	-20
23	28	21	Harrison Burton (R)	Wood Brothers Racing	Ford	160	14
24	22	16	Noah Gragson (i)	Kaulig Racing	Chevrolet	160	0
25	29	38	Todd Gilliland (R)	Front Row Motorsports	Ford	160	12
26	36	51	Cody Ware	Rick Ware Racing	Ford	160	11
27	24	4	Kevin Harvick	Stewart-Haas Racing	Ford	160	20
28	33	15	J. J. Yeley (i)	Rick Ware Racing	Ford	159	0
29	5	17	Chris Buescher	RFK Racing	Ford	158	8
30	35	78	B. J. McLeod (i)	Live Fast Motorsports	Ford	158	0
31	20	2	Austin Cindric (R)	Team Penske	Ford	154	6
32	21	1	Ross Chastain	Trackhouse Racing Team	Chevrolet	142	15
33	6	12	Ryan Blaney	Team Penske	Ford	135	20
34	31	77	Josh Bilicki (i)	Spire Motorsports	Chevrolet	35	0
DSQ (35)	1	11	Denny Hamlin (Note: Hamlin and Kyle Busch originally finished first and second respectively, but were disqualified after failing post-race inspection for an infringement on both cars' front fascia.)	Joe Gibbs Racing	Toyota	160	2
DSQ (36)	2	18	Kyle Busch	Joe Gibbs Racing	Toyota	160	1
Official race results

=== Race statistics ===
- Lead changes: 15 among 10 different drivers
- Cautions/Laps: 9 for 37
- Red flags: 0
- Time of race: 3 hours, 15 minutes and 59 seconds
- Average speed: 122.459 miles per hour (197.079 km/h)

== Media ==
=== Television ===
USA covered the race on the television side. Rick Allen, Jeff Burton, Steve Letarte, and Dale Earnhardt Jr. called the race from the broadcast booth. Kim Coon, Parker Kligerman, and Marty Snider served as pit reporters.

USA
Booth announcers	Pit reporters
Lap-by-lap: Rick Allen; Color-commentator: Jeff Burton; Color-commentator: Steve Letarte; Color-commentator: Dale Earnhardt Jr.	Kim Coon; Parker Kligerman; Marty Snider

=== Radio ===
Radio coverage of the race was broadcast by Motor Racing Network (MRN) and was also simulcast on Sirius XM NASCAR Radio. Alex Hayden, Jeff Striegle, and Todd Gordon called the race in the booth when the field raced through the tri-oval. Dave Moody called the race from the Sunoco spotters stand outside turn 2 when the field raced through turns 1 and 2. Mike Bagley called the race from a platform inside the backstretch when the field raced down the backstretch. Kyle Rickey called the race from the Sunoco spotters stand outside turn 3. Steve Post and Chris Wilner worked pit road for MRN.

MRN Radio
Booth announcers	Turn announcers	Pit reporters
Lead announcer: Alex Hayden; Announcer: Jeff Striegle; Announcer: Todd Gordon	Turns 1 & 2: Dave Moody; Backstretch: Mike Bagley; Turn 3: Kyle Rickey	Steve Post; Chris Wilner

== Standings after the race ==
Drivers' Championship standings

	Pos	Driver	Points
	1	Chase Elliott	787
	2	Ross Chastain	682 (–105)
	3	Ryan Blaney	676 (–111)
1	4	Kyle Larson	661 (–126)
1	5	Martin Truex Jr.	654 (–133)
2	6	Christopher Bell	605 (–182)
	7	Joey Logano	599 (–188)
2	8	Kyle Busch	595 (–192)
1	9	William Byron	572 (–215)
1	10	Kevin Harvick	571 (–216)
	11	Alex Bowman	536 (–251)
3	12	Daniel Suárez	526 (–261)
1	13	Aric Almirola	514 (–273)
2	14	Tyler Reddick	509 (–278)
2	15	Austin Cindric	495 (–292)
1	16	Chase Briscoe	487 (–300)
Official driver's standings

Manufacturers' Championship standings

Pos	Manufacturer	Points
1	Chevrolet	777
2	Ford	703 (–74)
3	Toyota	698 (–79)

- Note: Only the first 16 positions are included for the driver standings.
- . – Driver has clinched a position in the NASCAR Cup Series playoffs.

== Notes ==
Previous race: 2022 Ambetter 301	NASCAR Cup Series; 2022 season	Next race: 2022 Verizon 200 at the Brickyard
