= 2022 Ambetter 301 =

NASCAR Cup Series race

Race details
- Race 20 of 36 in the 2022 NASCAR Cup Series
- Date: July 17, 2022
- Location: New Hampshire Motor Speedway in Loudon, New Hampshire
- Course: Permanent racing facility
- Course length: 1.058 miles (1.703 km)
- Distance: 301 laps, 318.458 mi (512.603 km)
- Average speed: 98.113 miles per hour (157.898 km/h)

Pole position
Driver	Martin Truex Jr.	Joe Gibbs Racing
- Time: 29.964

Most laps led
Driver	Martin Truex Jr.	Joe Gibbs Racing
- Laps: 173

Winner
No. 20	Christopher Bell	Joe Gibbs Racing

Television in the United States
- Network: USA
- Announcers: Dale Earnhardt Jr., Jeff Burton, and Steve Letarte
- Nielsen ratings: 1.45 (2,403,000 viewers)

Radio in the United States
- Radio: PRN
- Booth announcers: Doug Rice and Mark Garrow
- Turn announcers: Rob Albright (1 & 2) and Doug Turnbull (3 & 4)

The 2022 Ambetter 301 was a NASCAR Cup Series race held on July 17, 2022, at New Hampshire Motor Speedway in Loudon, New Hampshire. Contested over 301 laps, on the 1.058-mile (1.703 km) speedway. It was the 20th race of the 2022 NASCAR Cup Series season.

This race was the last start for 2004 champion Kurt Busch, as Busch suffered a concussion during the second qualifying round for the next race, and the injuries from that crash ended up being career-ending; he announced on August 26, 2023 that he was officially retiring.

== Report ==
=== Background ===
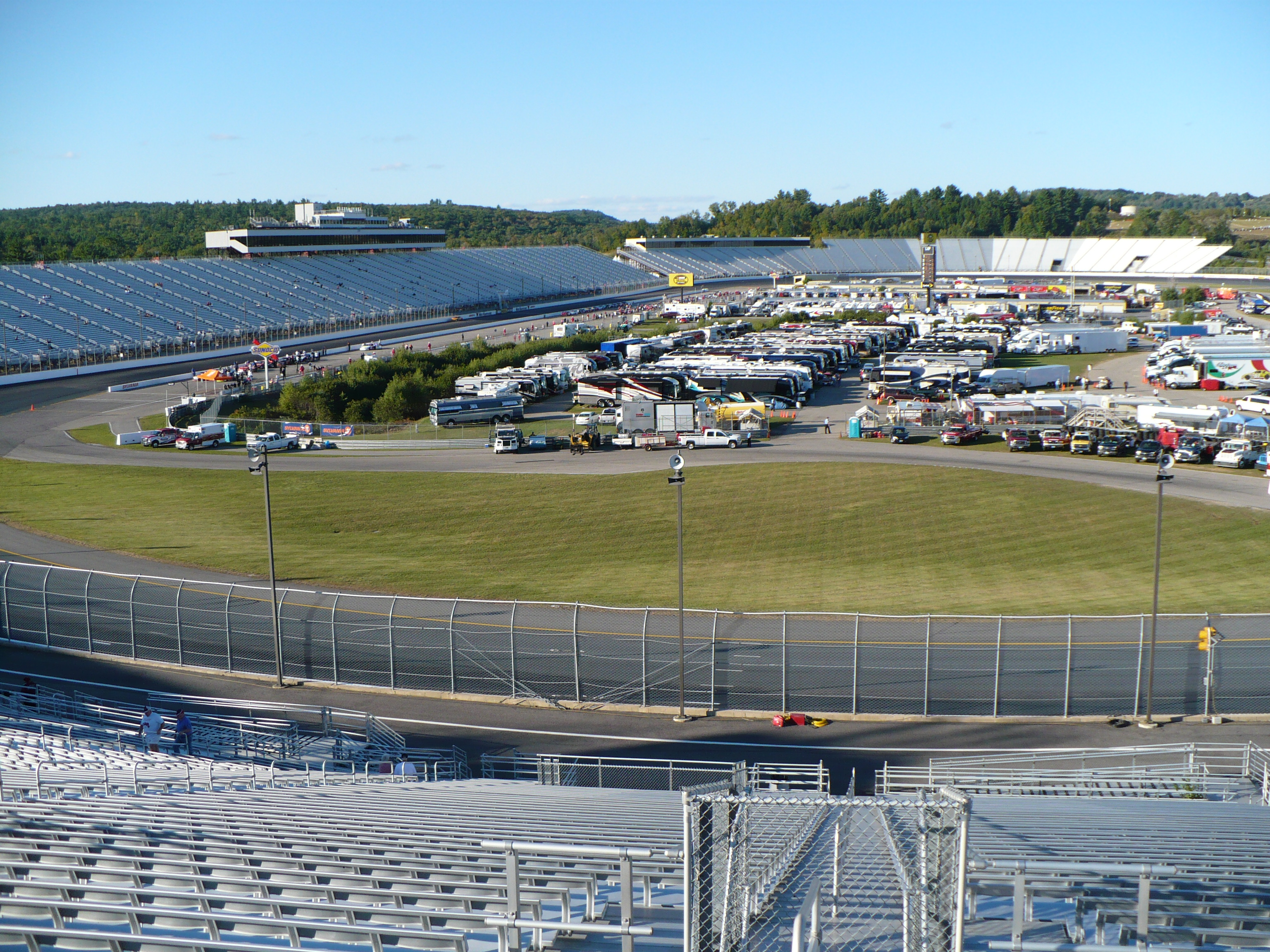
New Hampshire Motor Speedway, the track where the race was held.

New Hampshire Motor Speedway is a 1.058-mile (1.703 km) oval speedway located in Loudon, New Hampshire, which has hosted NASCAR racing annually since the early 1990s, as well as the longest-running motorcycle race in North America, the Loudon Classic. Nicknamed "The Magic Mile", the speedway is often converted into a 1.6-mile (2.6 km) road course, which includes much of the oval.

The track was originally the site of Bryar Motorsports Park before being purchased and redeveloped by Bob Bahre. The track is currently one of eight major NASCAR tracks owned and operated by Speedway Motorsports.

==== Entry list ====
- (R) denotes rookie driver.
- (i) denotes driver who is ineligible for series driver points.

No.	Driver	Team	Manufacturer
1	Ross Chastain	Trackhouse Racing Team	Chevrolet
2	Austin Cindric (R)	Team Penske	Ford
3	Austin Dillon	Richard Childress Racing	Chevrolet
4	Kevin Harvick	Stewart-Haas Racing	Ford
5	Kyle Larson	Hendrick Motorsports	Chevrolet
6	Brad Keselowski	RFK Racing	Ford
7	Corey LaJoie	Spire Motorsports	Chevrolet
8	Tyler Reddick	Richard Childress Racing	Chevrolet
9	Chase Elliott	Hendrick Motorsports	Chevrolet
10	Aric Almirola	Stewart-Haas Racing	Ford
11	Denny Hamlin	Joe Gibbs Racing	Toyota
12	Ryan Blaney	Team Penske	Ford
14	Chase Briscoe	Stewart-Haas Racing	Ford
15	J. J. Yeley (i)	Rick Ware Racing	Ford
16	A. J. Allmendinger (i)	Kaulig Racing	Chevrolet
17	Chris Buescher	RFK Racing	Ford
18	Kyle Busch	Joe Gibbs Racing	Toyota
19	Martin Truex Jr.	Joe Gibbs Racing	Toyota
20	Christopher Bell	Joe Gibbs Racing	Toyota
21	Harrison Burton (R)	Wood Brothers Racing	Ford
22	Joey Logano	Team Penske	Ford
23	Bubba Wallace	23XI Racing	Toyota
24	William Byron	Hendrick Motorsports	Chevrolet
31	Justin Haley	Kaulig Racing	Chevrolet
34	Michael McDowell	Front Row Motorsports	Ford
38	Todd Gilliland (R)	Front Row Motorsports	Ford
41	Cole Custer	Stewart-Haas Racing	Ford
42	Ty Dillon	Petty GMS Motorsports	Chevrolet
43	Erik Jones	Petty GMS Motorsports	Chevrolet
45	Kurt Busch	23XI Racing	Toyota
47	Ricky Stenhouse Jr.	JTG Daugherty Racing	Chevrolet
48	Alex Bowman	Hendrick Motorsports	Chevrolet
51	Cody Ware	Rick Ware Racing	Ford
77	Josh Bilicki (i)	Spire Motorsports	Chevrolet
78	B. J. McLeod (i)	Live Fast Motorsports	Ford
99	Daniel Suárez	Trackhouse Racing Team	Chevrolet
Official entry list

== Practice ==
William Byron was the fastest in the practice session with a time of 29.877 seconds and a speed of 127.483 mph (205.164 km/h).

=== Practice results ===
Pos	No.	Driver	Team	Manufacturer	Time	Speed
1	24	William Byron	Hendrick Motorsports	Chevrolet	29.877	127.483
2	18	Kyle Busch	Joe Gibbs Racing	Toyota	29.903	127.372
3	14	Chase Briscoe	Stewart-Haas Racing	Ford	29.938	127.223
Official practice results

== Qualifying ==
Martin Truex Jr. scored the pole for the race with a time of 29.964 and a speed of 127.113 mph (204.569 km/h).

=== Qualifying results ===
Pos	No.	Driver	Team	Manufacturer	R1	R2
1	19	Martin Truex Jr.	Joe Gibbs Racing	Toyota	29.739	29.964
2	9	Chase Elliott	Hendrick Motorsports	Chevrolet	29.898	30.009
3	45	Kurt Busch	23XI Racing	Toyota	29.669	30.032
4	23	Bubba Wallace	23XI Racing	Toyota	30.070	30.106
5	20	Christopher Bell	Joe Gibbs Racing	Toyota	29.968	30.127
6	24	William Byron	Hendrick Motorsports	Chevrolet	29.945	30.136
7	10	Aric Almirola	Stewart-Haas Racing	Ford	30.135	30.219
8	5	Kyle Larson	Hendrick Motorsports	Chevrolet	29.748	30.224
9	6	Brad Keselowski	RFK Racing	Ford	30.276	30.409
10	4	Kevin Harvick	Stewart-Haas Racing	Ford	29.945	0.000
11	12	Ryan Blaney	Team Penske	Ford	29.997	—
12	22	Joey Logano	Team Penske	Ford	30.056	—
13	8	Tyler Reddick	Richard Childress Racing	Chevrolet	30.186	—
14	11	Denny Hamlin	Joe Gibbs Racing	Toyota	30.187	—
15	34	Michael McDowell	Front Row Motorsports	Ford	30.267	—
16	17	Chris Buescher	RFK Racing	Ford	30.293	—
17	18	Kyle Busch	Joe Gibbs Racing	Toyota	30.312	—
18	1	Ross Chastain	Trackhouse Racing Team	Chevrolet	30.332	—
19	99	Daniel Suárez	Trackhouse Racing Team	Chevrolet	30.364	—
20	16	A. J. Allmendinger (i)	Kaulig Racing	Chevrolet	30.391	—
21	7	Corey LaJoie	Spire Motorsports	Chevrolet	30.410	—
22	43	Erik Jones	Petty GMS Motorsports	Chevrolet	30.422	—
23	41	Cole Custer	Stewart-Haas Racing	Ford	30.455	—
24	47	Ricky Stenhouse Jr.	JTG Daugherty Racing	Chevrolet	30.461	—
25	31	Justin Haley	Kaulig Racing	Chevrolet	30.476	—
26	38	Todd Gilliland (R)	Front Row Motorsports	Ford	30.523	—
27	48	Alex Bowman	Hendrick Motorsports	Chevrolet	30.584	—
28	2	Austin Cindric (R)	Team Penske	Ford	30.601	—
29	14	Chase Briscoe	Stewart-Haas Racing	Ford	30.675	—
30	3	Austin Dillon	Richard Childress Racing	Chevrolet	30.759	—
31	21	Harrison Burton (R)	Wood Brothers Racing	Ford	30.785	—
32	78	B. J. McLeod (i)	Live Fast Motorsports	Ford	30.885	—
33	15	J. J. Yeley (i)	Rick Ware Racing	Ford	31.064	—
34	77	Josh Bilicki (i)	Spire Motorsports	Chevrolet	31.101	—
35	42	Ty Dillon	Petty GMS Motorsports	Chevrolet	31.288	—
36	51	Cody Ware	Rick Ware Racing	Ford	31.359	—
Official qualifying results

== Race ==
=== Stage Results ===
Stage One Laps: 70

Pos	No	Driver	Team	Manufacturer	Points
1	19	Martin Truex Jr.	Joe Gibbs Racing	Toyota	10
2	23	Bubba Wallace	23XI Racing	Toyota	9
3	5	Kyle Larson	Hendrick Motorsports	Chevrolet	8
4	9	Chase Elliott	Hendrick Motorsports	Chevrolet	7
5	4	Kevin Harvick	Stewart-Haas Racing	Ford	6
6	20	Christopher Bell	Joe Gibbs Racing	Toyota	5
7	45	Kurt Busch	23XI Racing	Toyota	4
8	10	Aric Almirola	Stewart-Haas Racing	Ford	3
9	24	William Byron	Hendrick Motorsports	Chevrolet	2
10	11	Denny Hamlin	Joe Gibbs Racing	Toyota	1
Official stage one results

Stage Two Laps: 115

Pos	No	Driver	Team	Manufacturer	Points
1	19	Martin Truex Jr.	Joe Gibbs Racing	Toyota	10
2	4	Kevin Harvick	Stewart-Haas Racing	Ford	9
3	9	Chase Elliott	Hendrick Motorsports	Chevrolet	8
4	22	Joey Logano	Team Penske	Ford	7
5	5	Kyle Larson	Hendrick Motorsports	Chevrolet	6
6	45	Kurt Busch	23XI Racing	Toyota	5
7	1	Ross Chastain	Trackhouse Racing Team	Chevrolet	4
8	24	William Byron	Hendrick Motorsports	Chevrolet	3
9	20	Christopher Bell	Joe Gibbs Racing	Toyota	2
10	23	Bubba Wallace	23XI Racing	Toyota	1
Official stage two results

=== Final Stage Results ===
Stage Three Laps: 116

Pos	Grid	No	Driver	Team	Manufacturer	Laps	Points
1	5	20	Christopher Bell	Joe Gibbs Racing	Toyota	301	47
2	2	9	Chase Elliott	Hendrick Motorsports	Chevrolet	301	50
3	4	23	Bubba Wallace	23XI Racing	Toyota	301	44
4	1	19	Martin Truex Jr.	Joe Gibbs Racing	Toyota	301	53
5	10	4	Kevin Harvick	Stewart-Haas Racing	Ford	301	47
6	14	11	Denny Hamlin	Joe Gibbs Racing	Toyota	301	32
7	9	6	Brad Keselowski	RFK Racing	Ford	301	30
8	18	1	Ross Chastain	Trackhouse Racing Team	Chevrolet	301	33
9	19	99	Daniel Suárez	Trackhouse Racing Team	Chevrolet	301	28
10	3	45	Kurt Busch	23XI Racing	Toyota	301	36
11	6	24	William Byron	Hendrick Motorsports	Chevrolet	301	31
12	17	18	Kyle Busch	Joe Gibbs Racing	Toyota	301	25
13	28	2	Austin Cindric (R)	Team Penske	Ford	301	24
14	8	5	Kyle Larson	Hendrick Motorsports	Chevrolet	301	37
15	29	14	Chase Briscoe	Stewart-Haas Racing	Ford	300	22
16	20	16	A. J. Allmendinger (i)	Kaulig Racing	Chevrolet	300	0
17	16	17	Chris Buescher	RFK Racing	Ford	300	20
18	11	12	Ryan Blaney	Team Penske	Ford	300	19
19	23	43	Erik Jones	Petty GMS Motorsports	Chevrolet	300	18
20	25	31	Justin Haley	Kaulig Racing	Chevrolet	300	17
21	13	8	Tyler Reddick	Richard Childress Racing	Chevrolet	300	16
22	24	47	Ricky Stenhouse Jr.	JTG Daugherty Racing	Chevrolet	300	15
23	30	3	Austin Dillon	Richard Childress Racing	Chevrolet	300	14
24	12	22	Joey Logano	Team Penske	Ford	300	20
25	31	21	Harrison Burton (R)	Wood Brothers Racing	Ford	300	12
26	26	38	Todd Gilliland (R)	Front Row Motorsports	Ford	300	11
27	23	41	Cole Custer	Stewart-Haas Racing	Ford	300	10
28	15	34	Michael McDowell	Front Row Motorsports	Ford	299	9
29	33	15	J. J. Yeley (i)	Rick Ware Racing	Ford	299	0
30	36	51	Cody Ware	Rick Ware Racing	Ford	297	7
31	7	10	Aric Almirola	Stewart-Haas Racing	Ford	282	9
32	21	7	Corey LaJoie	Spire Motorsports	Chevrolet	88	5
33	34	77	Josh Bilicki (i)	Spire Motorsports	Chevrolet	5	0
34	35	42	Ty Dillon	Petty GMS Motorsports	Chevrolet	5	3
35	27	48	Alex Bowman	Hendrick Motorsports	Chevrolet	4	2
36	32	78	B. J. McLeod (i)	Live Fast Motorsports	Ford	4	0
Official race results

=== Race statistics ===
- Lead changes: 8 among 7 different drivers
- Cautions/Laps: 9 for 52
- Red flags: 0
- Time of race: 3 hours, 14 minutes and 45 seconds
- Average speed: 98.113 miles per hour (157.898 km/h)

== Media ==
=== Television ===
USA covered the race on the television side. Dale Earnhardt Jr., four-time and all-time Loudon winner Jeff Burton and Steve Letarte called the race from the broadcast booth. Kim Coon, Parker Kligerman and Marty Snider handled the pit road duties from pit lane.

USA
Booth announcers	Pit reporters
Lap-by-lap: Dale Earnhardt Jr. Color-commentator: Jeff Burton; Color-commentator: Steve Letarte	Kim Coon; Parker Kligerman; Marty Snider

=== Radio ===
PRN had the radio call for the race, which was also simulcast on Sirius XM NASCAR Radio. Doug Rice and Mark Garrow called the race from the booth when the field races down the frontstretch. Rob Albright called the race from turns 1 & 2 and Doug Turnbull called the race from turns 3 & 4. Brad Gillie, Brett McMillan and Wendy Venturini handled the duties on pit lane.

PRN
Booth announcers	Turn announcers	Pit reporters
Lead announcer: Doug Rice; Announcer: Mark Garrow	Turns 1 & 2: Rob Albright; Turns 3 & 4: Doug Turnbull	Brad Gillie; Brett McMillan; Wendy Venturini

== Standings after the race ==
Drivers' Championship standings

	Pos	Driver	Points
	1	Chase Elliott	734
1	2	Ross Chastain	667 (–67)
1	3	Ryan Blaney	656 (–78)
2	4	Martin Truex Jr.	619 (–115)
1	5	Kyle Larson	616 (–118)
1	6	Kyle Busch	594 (–140)
	7	Joey Logano	582 (–152)
	8	Christopher Bell	570 (–164)
2	9	Kevin Harvick	551 (–183)
	10	William Byron	536 (–198)
2	11	Alex Bowman	510 (–224)
	12	Aric Almirola	490 (–244)
	13	Austin Cindric	489 (–245)
2	14	Kurt Busch	485 (–249)
	15	Daniel Suárez	479 (–255)
2	16	Tyler Reddick	474 (–260)
Official driver's standings

Manufacturers' Championship standings

Pos	Manufacturer	Points
1	Chevrolet	737
2	Ford	672 (–65)
3	Toyota	665 (–72)

- Note: Only the first 16 positions are included for the driver standings.
- . – Driver has clinched a position in the NASCAR Cup Series playoffs.

Previous race: 2022 Quaker State 400	NASCAR Cup Series; 2022 season	Next race: 2022 M&M's Fan Appreciation 400
