= 2023 NOCO 400 =

NASCAR Cup Series race

Race details
- Race 9 of 36 in the 2023 NASCAR Cup Series
- Date: April 16, 2023
- Location: Martinsville Speedway in Ridgeway, Virginia
- Course: Permanent racing facility
- Course length: 0.526 miles (0.847 km)
- Distance: 400 laps, 210.4 mi (338.8 km)
- Average speed: 74.005 miles per hour (119.100 km/h)

Pole position
Driver	Ryan Preece	Stewart-Haas Racing
- Time: 19.979

Most laps led
Driver	Ryan Preece	Stewart-Haas Racing
- Laps: 136

Winner
No. 5	Kyle Larson	Hendrick Motorsports

Television in the United States
- Network: FS1
- Announcers: Mike Joy, Clint Bowyer, and Bobby Labonte

Radio in the United States
- Radio: MRN
- Booth announcers: Alex Hayden, Jeff Striegle, and Todd Gordon
- Turn announcers: Dave Moody (Backstretch)

The 2023 NOCO 400 was a NASCAR Cup Series race held on April 16, 2023, at Martinsville Speedway in Ridgeway, Virginia. Contested over 400 laps on the 0.526 mile (0.847 km) paperclip-shaped short track; it was the ninth race of the 2023 NASCAR Cup Series season.

== Report ==
=== Background ===
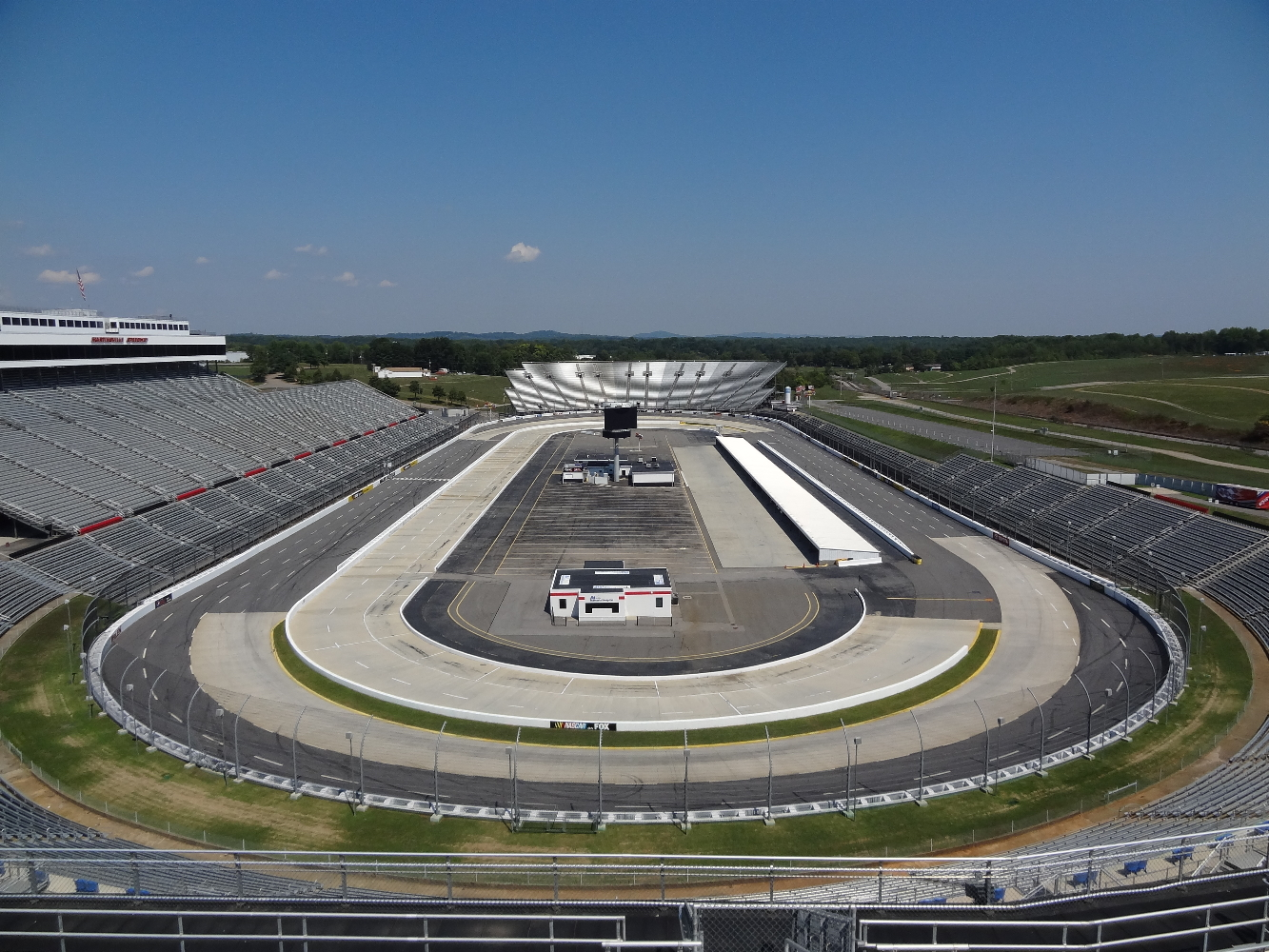
Martinsville Speedway, the track where the race was held.

Martinsville Speedway is a NASCAR-owned stock car racing track located in Henry County, in Ridgeway, Virginia, just to the south of Martinsville. At 0.526 miles (0.847 km) in length, it is the shortest track in the NASCAR Cup Series. The track was also one of the first paved oval tracks in NASCAR, being built in 1947 by H. Clay Earles. It is also the only remaining race track on the NASCAR circuit since its beginning in 1948.

This race saw the return of Chase Elliott, after he missed the prior six races after an injury from a skiing accident.

==== Entry list ====
- (R) denotes rookie driver.
- (i) denotes the driver ineligible for series driver points.

No.	Driver	Team	Manufacturer
1	Ross Chastain	Trackhouse Racing	Chevrolet
2	Austin Cindric	Team Penske	Ford
3	Austin Dillon	Richard Childress Racing	Chevrolet
4	Kevin Harvick	Stewart-Haas Racing	Ford
5	Kyle Larson	Hendrick Motorsports	Chevrolet
6	Brad Keselowski	RFK Racing	Ford
7	Corey LaJoie	Spire Motorsports	Chevrolet
8	Kyle Busch	Richard Childress Racing	Chevrolet
9	Chase Elliott	Hendrick Motorsports	Chevrolet
10	Aric Almirola	Stewart-Haas Racing	Ford
11	Denny Hamlin	Joe Gibbs Racing	Toyota
12	Ryan Blaney	Team Penske	Ford
14	Chase Briscoe	Stewart-Haas Racing	Ford
15	J. J. Yeley (i)	Rick Ware Racing	Ford
16	A. J. Allmendinger	Kaulig Racing	Chevrolet
17	Chris Buescher	RFK Racing	Ford
19	Martin Truex Jr.	Joe Gibbs Racing	Toyota
20	Christopher Bell	Joe Gibbs Racing	Toyota
21	Harrison Burton	Wood Brothers Racing	Ford
22	Joey Logano	Team Penske	Ford
23	Bubba Wallace	23XI Racing	Toyota
24	William Byron	Hendrick Motorsports	Chevrolet
31	Justin Haley	Kaulig Racing	Chevrolet
34	Michael McDowell	Front Row Motorsports	Ford
38	Todd Gilliland	Front Row Motorsports	Ford
41	Ryan Preece	Stewart-Haas Racing	Ford
42	Noah Gragson (R)	Legacy Motor Club	Chevrolet
43	Erik Jones	Legacy Motor Club	Chevrolet
45	Tyler Reddick	23XI Racing	Toyota
47	Ricky Stenhouse Jr.	JTG Daugherty Racing	Chevrolet
48	Alex Bowman	Hendrick Motorsports	Chevrolet
51	Zane Smith (i)	Rick Ware Racing	Ford
54	Ty Gibbs (R)	Joe Gibbs Racing	Toyota
77	Ty Dillon	Spire Motorsports	Chevrolet
78	Anthony Alfredo (i)	Live Fast Motorsports	Chevrolet
99	Daniel Suárez	Trackhouse Racing	Chevrolet
Official entry list

== Practice ==
Tyler Reddick was the fastest in the practice session with a time of 20.217 seconds and a speed of 93.664 mph (150.738 km/h).

=== Practice results ===
Pos	No.	Driver	Team	Manufacturer	Time	Speed
1	45	Tyler Reddick	23XI Racing	Toyota	20.217	93.664
2	24	William Byron	Hendrick Motorsports	Chevrolet	20.395	92.846
3	1	Ross Chastain	Trackhouse Racing	Chevrolet	20.397	92.837
Official practice results

== Qualifying ==
Ryan Preece scored the pole for the race with a time of 19.979 and a speed of 94.780 mph (152.534 km/h).

=== Qualifying results ===
Pos	No.	Driver	Team	Manufacturer	R1	R2
1	41	Ryan Preece	Stewart-Haas Racing	Ford	20.046	19.979
2	99	Daniel Suárez	Trackhouse Racing	Chevrolet	20.139	20.081
3	10	Aric Almirola	Stewart-Haas Racing	Ford	20.059	20.081
4	14	Chase Briscoe	Stewart-Haas Racing	Ford	20.055	20.112
5	19	Martin Truex Jr.	Joe Gibbs Racing	Toyota	20.106	20.119
6	45	Tyler Reddick	23XI Racing	Toyota	20.252	20.128
7	4	Kevin Harvick	Stewart-Haas Racing	Ford	20.159	20.150
8	24	William Byron	Hendrick Motorsports	Chevrolet	20.193	20.155
9	23	Bubba Wallace	23XI Racing	Toyota	20.059	20.167
10	17	Chris Buescher	RFK Racing	Ford	20.244	20.191
11	11	Denny Hamlin	Joe Gibbs Racing	Toyota	20.227	—
12	54	Ty Gibbs (R)	Joe Gibbs Racing	Toyota	20.232	—
13	38	Todd Gilliland	Front Row Motorsports	Ford	20.267	—
14	16	A. J. Allmendinger	Kaulig Racing	Chevrolet	20.297	—
15	22	Joey Logano	Team Penske	Ford	20.304	—
16	47	Ricky Stenhouse Jr.	JTG Daugherty Racing	Chevrolet	20.307	—
17	8	Kyle Busch	Richard Childress Racing	Chevrolet	20.326	—
18	3	Austin Dillon	Richard Childress Racing	Chevrolet	20.353	—
19	5	Kyle Larson	Hendrick Motorsports	Chevrolet	20.356	—
20	34	Michael McDowell	Front Row Motorsports	Ford	20.362	—
21	6	Brad Keselowski	RFK Racing	Ford	20.377	—
22	20	Christopher Bell	Joe Gibbs Racing	Toyota	20.382	—
23	48	Alex Bowman	Hendrick Motorsports	Chevrolet	20.382	—
24	9	Chase Elliott	Hendrick Motorsports	Chevrolet	20.384	—
25	2	Austin Cindric	Team Penske	Ford	20.394	—
26	31	Justin Haley	Kaulig Racing	Chevrolet	20.395	—
27	7	Corey LaJoie	Spire Motorsports	Chevrolet	20.408	—
28	43	Erik Jones	Legacy Motor Club	Chevrolet	20.409	—
29	42	Noah Gragson (R)	Legacy Motor Club	Chevrolet	20.469	—
30	78	Anthony Alfredo (i)	Live Fast Motorsports	Chevrolet	20.478	—
31	12	Ryan Blaney	Team Penske	Ford	20.507	—
32	21	Harrison Burton	Wood Brothers Racing	Ford	20.507	—
33	51	Zane Smith (i)	Rick Ware Racing	Ford	20.571	—
34	1	Ross Chastain	Trackhouse Racing	Chevrolet	20.619	—
35	77	Ty Dillon	Spire Motorsports	Chevrolet	20.624	—
36	15	J. J. Yeley (i)	Rick Ware Racing	Ford	20.673	—
Official qualifying results

== Race ==
=== Race results ===
==== Stage Results ====
Stage One Laps: 80

Pos	No	Driver	Team	Manufacturer	Points
1	41	Ryan Preece	Stewart-Haas Racing	Ford	10
2	10	Aric Almirola	Stewart-Haas Racing	Ford	9
3	45	Tyler Reddick	23XI Racing	Toyota	8
4	99	Daniel Suárez	Trackhouse Racing	Chevrolet	7
5	14	Chase Briscoe	Stewart-Haas Racing	Ford	6
6	4	Kevin Harvick	Stewart-Haas Racing	Ford	5
7	23	Bubba Wallace	23XI Racing	Toyota	4
8	11	Denny Hamlin	Joe Gibbs Racing	Toyota	3
9	5	Kyle Larson	Hendrick Motorsports	Chevrolet	2
10	24	William Byron	Hendrick Motorsports	Chevrolet	1
Official stage one results

Stage Two Laps: 100

Pos	No	Driver	Team	Manufacturer	Points
1	4	Kevin Harvick	Stewart-Haas Racing	Ford	10
2	14	Chase Briscoe	Stewart-Haas Racing	Ford	9
3	11	Denny Hamlin	Joe Gibbs Racing	Toyota	8
4	45	Tyler Reddick	23XI Racing	Toyota	7
5	6	Brad Keselowski	RFK Racing	Ford	6
6	1	Ross Chastain	Trackhouse Racing	Chevrolet	5
7	38	Todd Gilliland	Front Row Motorsports	Ford	4
8	99	Daniel Suárez	Trackhouse Racing	Chevrolet	3
9	10	Aric Almirola	Stewart-Haas Racing	Ford	2
10	5	Kyle Larson	Hendrick Motorsports	Chevrolet	1
Official stage two results

=== Final Stage Results ===
Stage Three Laps: 220

Pos	Grid	No	Driver	Team	Manufacturer	Laps	Points
1	19	5	Kyle Larson	Hendrick Motorsports	Chevrolet	400	43
2	15	22	Joey Logano	Team Penske	Ford	400	35
3	5	19	Martin Truex Jr.	Joe Gibbs Racing	Toyota	400	34
4	11	11	Denny Hamlin	Joe Gibbs Racing	Toyota	400	44
5	4	14	Chase Briscoe	Stewart-Haas Racing	Ford	400	47
6	3	10	Aric Almirola	Stewart-Haas Racing	Ford	400	42
7	31	12	Ryan Blaney	Team Penske	Ford	400	30
8	16	47	Ricky Stenhouse Jr.	JTG Daugherty Racing	Chevrolet	400	29
9	9	23	Bubba Wallace	23XI Racing	Toyota	400	32
10	24	9	Chase Elliott	Hendrick Motorsports	Chevrolet	400	27
11	23	48	Alex Bowman	Hendrick Motorsports	Chevrolet	400	26
12	18	3	Austin Dillon	Richard Childress Racing	Chevrolet	400	-35
13	34	1	Ross Chastain	Trackhouse Racing	Chevrolet	400	29
14	10	17	Chris Buescher	RFK Racing	Ford	400	23
15	1	41	Ryan Preece	Stewart-Haas Racing	Ford	400	32
16	22	20	Christopher Bell	Joe Gibbs Racing	Toyota	400	21
17	2	99	Daniel Suárez	Trackhouse Racing	Chevrolet	400	30
18	12	54	Ty Gibbs (R)	Joe Gibbs Racing	Toyota	400	19
19	20	34	Michael McDowell	Front Row Motorsports	Ford	400	18
20	7	4	Kevin Harvick	Stewart-Haas Racing	Ford	400	32
21	17	8	Kyle Busch	Richard Childress Racing	Chevrolet	400	16
22	6	45	Tyler Reddick	23XI Racing	Toyota	400	30
23	8	24	William Byron	Hendrick Motorsports	Chevrolet	400	15
24	21	6	Brad Keselowski	RFK Racing	Ford	400	19
25	13	38	Todd Gilliland	Front Row Motorsports	Ford	399	16
26	27	7	Corey LaJoie	Spire Motorsports	Chevrolet	399	11
27	14	16	A. J. Allmendinger	Kaulig Racing	Chevrolet	399	10
28	26	31	Justin Haley	Kaulig Racing	Chevrolet	398	9
29	32	21	Harrison Burton	Wood Brothers Racing	Ford	398	8
30	29	42	Noah Gragson (R)	Legacy Motor Club	Chevrolet	398	7
31	28	43	Erik Jones	Legacy Motor Club	Chevrolet	398	6
32	35	77	Ty Dillon	Spire Motorsports	Chevrolet	397	5
33	25	2	Austin Cindric	Team Penske	Ford	397	4
34	33	51	Zane Smith (i)	Rick Ware Racing	Ford	395	0
35	30	78	Anthony Alfredo (i)	Live Fast Motorsports	Chevrolet	390	0
36	36	15	J. J. Yeley (i)	Rick Ware Racing	Ford	337	0
Official race results

=== Race statistics ===
- Lead changes: 10 among 9 different drivers
- Cautions/Laps: 5 for 50 laps
- Red flags: 0
- Time of race: 2 hours, 50 minutes, and 35 seconds
- Average speed: 74.005 miles per hour (119.100 km/h)

== Media ==
=== Television ===
Fox Sports covered their 23rd race at the Martinsville Speedway. Mike Joy, 2018 Spring Martinsville winner Clint Bowyer and 2002 Spring Martinsville winner Bobby Labonte called the race from the broadcast booth. Jamie Little and Regan Smith handled the pit road for the television side. Larry McReynolds provided insight from the Fox Sports studio in Charlotte.

FS1
Booth announcers	Pit reporters	In-race analyst
Lap-by-lap: Mike Joy; Color-commentator: Clint Bowyer; Color-commentator: Bobby Labonte	Jamie Little; Regan Smith	Larry McReynolds

=== Radio ===
MRN had the radio call for the race, which was also simulcasted on Sirius XM NASCAR Radio. Alex Hayden, Jeff Striegle, and Todd Gordon called the race in the booth when the field races down the front stretch. Dave Moody called the race from a platform inside the backstretch when the field races down the backstretch. Steve Post, Kim Coon, and Dillon Welch worked the pit road for the radio side.

MRN
Booth announcers	Turn announcers	Pit reporters
Lead announcer: Alex Hayden; Announcer: Jeff Striegle; Announcer: Todd Gordon	Backstretch: Dave Moody	Steve Post; Kim Coon; Dillon Welch

== Standings after the race ==
Drivers' Championship standings

	Pos	Driver	Points
	1	Christopher Bell	302
	2	Ross Chastain	297 (–5)
	3	Kevin Harvick	287 (–15)
	4	Kyle Larson	285 (–17)
2	5	Martin Truex Jr.	266 (–36)
1	6	Tyler Reddick	265 (–37)
1	7	Joey Logano	258 (–44)
2	8	Kyle Busch	250 (–52)
3	9	Denny Hamlin	247 (–55)
	10	Ryan Blaney	241 (–61)
	11	Alex Bowman	237 (–65)
3	12	Brad Keselowski	235 (–67)
	13	Ricky Stenhouse Jr.	223 (–79)
6	14	Chase Briscoe	210 (–92)
1	15	William Byron	208 (–94)
	16	Chris Buescher	206 (–96)
Official driver's standings

Manufacturers' Championship standings

Pos	Manufacturer	Points
1	Chevrolet	342
2	Toyota	313 (–29)
3	Ford	303 (–39)

- Note: Only the first 16 positions are included for the driver standings.

Previous race: 2023 Food City Dirt Race	NASCAR Cup Series; 2023 season	Next race: 2023 GEICO 500
