= 2023 Bass Pro Shops Night Race =

NASCAR Cup Series race

Race details
- Race 29 of 36 in the 2023 NASCAR Cup Series
- Date: September 16, 2023
- Location: Bristol Motor Speedway in Bristol, Tennessee
- Course: Permanent racing facility
- Course length: .533 miles (.858 km)
- Distance: 500 laps, 266.5 mi (429 km)
- Average speed: 94.99 miles per hour (152.87 km/h)

Pole position
Driver	Christopher Bell	Joe Gibbs Racing
- Time: 15.109

Most laps led
Driver	Christopher Bell	Joe Gibbs Racing
- Laps: 187

Winner
No. 11	Denny Hamlin	Joe Gibbs Racing

Television in the United States
- Network: USA
- Announcers: Rick Allen, Jeff Burton, Steve Letarte and Dale Earnhardt Jr.

Radio in the United States
- Radio: PRN
- Booth announcers: Doug Rice and Mark Garrow
- Turn announcers: Rob Albright (Backstretch)

The 2023 Bass Pro Shops Night Race was a NASCAR Cup Series race held on September 16, 2023, at Bristol Motor Speedway in Bristol, Tennessee. Contested over 500 laps on the .533-mile (0.858 km) short track, it was the 29th race of the 2023 NASCAR Cup Series season, the third race of the Playoffs, and the final race of the Round of 16.

== Report ==
=== Background ===
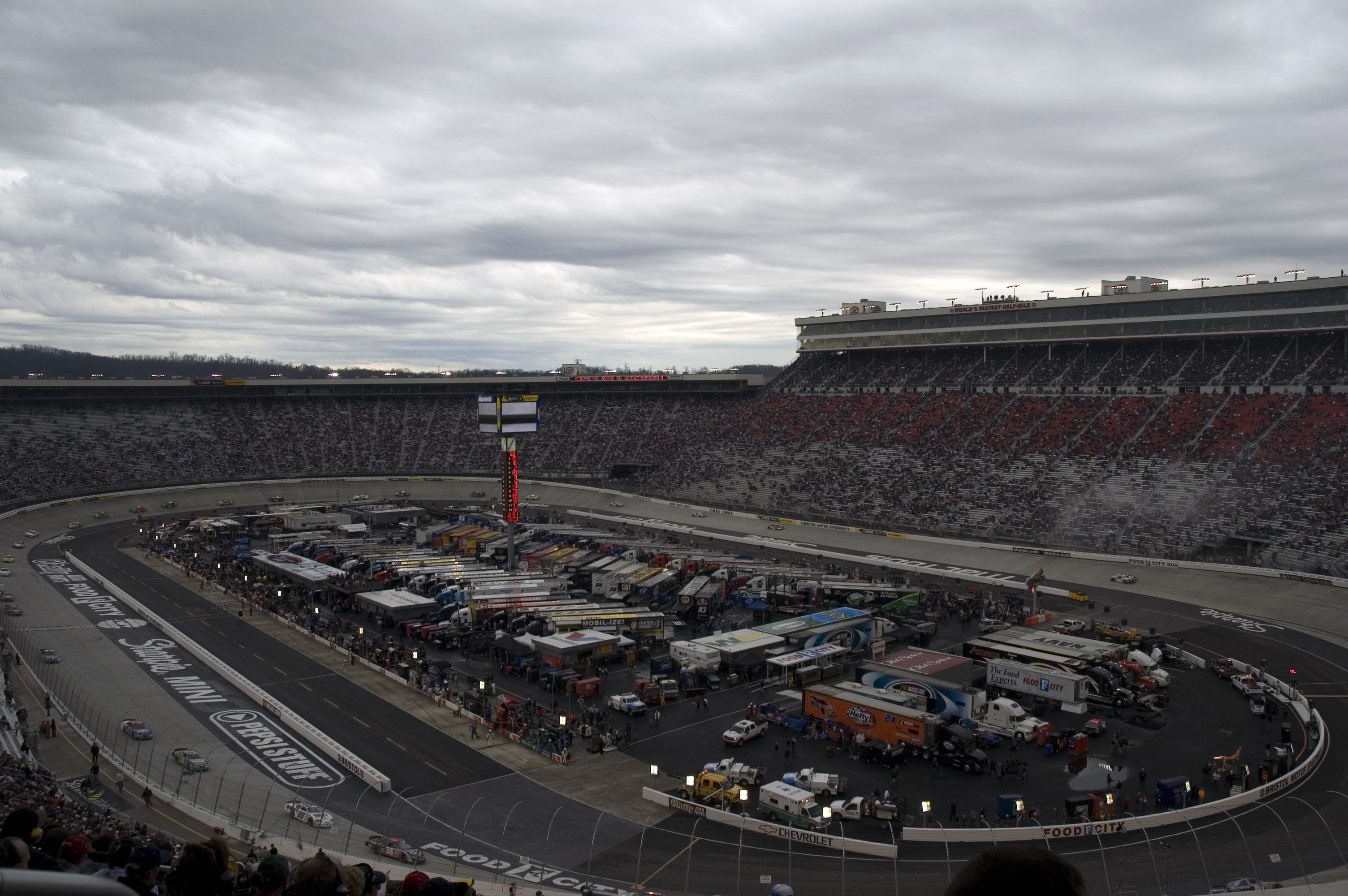
Bristol Motor Speedway, the track where the race was held.

The Bristol Motor Speedway, formerly known as Bristol International Raceway and Bristol Raceway, is a NASCAR short track venue located in Bristol, Tennessee. Constructed in 1960, it held its first NASCAR race on July 30, 1961. Despite its short length, Bristol is among the most popular tracks on the NASCAR schedule because of its distinct features, which include extraordinarily steep banking, an all concrete surface, two pit roads, and stadium-like seating. It has also been named one of the loudest NASCAR tracks.

==== Entry list ====
- (R) denotes rookie driver.
- (i) denotes the driver ineligible for series driver points.
- (P) denotes playoff driver.
- (OP) denotes owner's playoffs car.

No.	Driver	Team	Manufacturer
1	Ross Chastain (P)	Trackhouse Racing	Chevrolet
2	Austin Cindric	Team Penske	Ford
3	Austin Dillon	Richard Childress Racing	Chevrolet
4	Kevin Harvick (P)	Stewart-Haas Racing	Ford
5	Kyle Larson (P)	Hendrick Motorsports	Chevrolet
6	Brad Keselowski (P)	RFK Racing	Ford
7	Corey LaJoie	Spire Motorsports	Chevrolet
8	Kyle Busch (P)	Richard Childress Racing	Chevrolet
9	Chase Elliott (OP)	Hendrick Motorsports	Chevrolet
10	Aric Almirola	Stewart-Haas Racing	Ford
11	Denny Hamlin (P)	Joe Gibbs Racing	Toyota
12	Ryan Blaney (P)	Team Penske	Ford
14	Chase Briscoe	Stewart-Haas Racing	Ford
15	J. J. Yeley (i)	Rick Ware Racing	Ford
16	A. J. Allmendinger	Kaulig Racing	Chevrolet
17	Chris Buescher (P)	RFK Racing	Ford
19	Martin Truex Jr. (P)	Joe Gibbs Racing	Toyota
20	Christopher Bell (P)	Joe Gibbs Racing	Toyota
21	Harrison Burton	Wood Brothers Racing	Ford
22	Joey Logano (P)	Team Penske	Ford
23	Bubba Wallace (P)	23XI Racing	Toyota
24	William Byron (P)	Hendrick Motorsports	Chevrolet
31	Justin Haley	Kaulig Racing	Chevrolet
34	Michael McDowell (P)	Front Row Motorsports	Ford
38	Todd Gilliland	Front Row Motorsports	Ford
41	Ryan Preece	Stewart-Haas Racing	Ford
42	Carson Hocevar (i)	Legacy Motor Club	Chevrolet
43	Erik Jones	Legacy Motor Club	Chevrolet
45	Tyler Reddick (P)	23XI Racing	Toyota
47	Ricky Stenhouse Jr. (P)	JTG Daugherty Racing	Chevrolet
48	Alex Bowman	Hendrick Motorsports	Chevrolet
51	Ryan Newman	Rick Ware Racing	Ford
54	Ty Gibbs (R)	Joe Gibbs Racing	Toyota
77	Ty Dillon	Spire Motorsports	Chevrolet
78	B. J. McLeod (i)	Live Fast Motorsports	Chevrolet
99	Daniel Suárez	Trackhouse Racing	Chevrolet
Official entry list

== Practice ==
Kyle Larson was the fastest in the practice session with a time of 15.186 seconds and a speed of 126.353 mph (203.345 km/h).

=== Practice results ===
Pos	No.	Driver	Team	Manufacturer	Time	Speed
1	5	Kyle Larson (P)	Hendrick Motorsports	Chevrolet	15.186	126.353
2	17	Chris Buescher (P)	RFK Racing	Ford	15.262	125.724
3	23	Bubba Wallace (P)	23XI Racing	Toyota	15.333	125.142
Official practice results

== Qualifying ==
Christopher Bell scored the pole for the race with a time 15.109 of and a speed of 126.997 mph (204.382 km/h).

=== Qualifying results ===
Pos	No.	Driver	Team	Manufacturer	R1	R2
1	20	Christopher Bell (P)	Joe Gibbs Racing	Toyota	15.111	15.109
2	11	Denny Hamlin (P)	Joe Gibbs Racing	Toyota	15.062	15.117
3	24	William Byron (P)	Hendrick Motorsports	Chevrolet	15.107	15.187
4	34	Michael McDowell (P)	Front Row Motorsports	Ford	15.189	15.202
5	19	Martin Truex Jr. (P)	Joe Gibbs Racing	Toyota	15.220	15.210
6	6	Brad Keselowski (P)	RFK Racing	Ford	15.106	15.233
7	9	Chase Elliott (OP)	Hendrick Motorsports	Chevrolet	15.338	15.239
8	54	Ty Gibbs (R)	Joe Gibbs Racing	Toyota	15.160	15.239
9	23	Bubba Wallace (P)	23XI Racing	Toyota	15.305	15.241
10	7	Corey LaJoie	Spire Motorsports	Chevrolet	15.255	15.274
11	12	Ryan Blaney (P)	Team Penske	Ford	15.230	—
12	45	Tyler Reddick (P)	23XI Racing	Toyota	15.245	—
13	48	Alex Bowman	Hendrick Motorsports	Chevrolet	15.252	—
14	14	Chase Briscoe	Stewart-Haas Racing	Ford	15.264	—
15	8	Kyle Busch (P)	Richard Childress Racing	Chevrolet	15.282	—
16	42	Carson Hocevar (i)	Legacy Motor Club	Chevrolet	15.293	—
17	41	Ryan Preece	Stewart-Haas Racing	Ford	15.306	—
18	3	Austin Dillon	Richard Childress Racing	Chevrolet	15.312	—
19	31	Justin Haley	Kaulig Racing	Chevrolet	15.343	—
20	17	Chris Buescher (P)	RFK Racing	Ford	15.345	—
21	4	Kevin Harvick (P)	Stewart-Haas Racing	Ford	15.354	—
22	16	A. J. Allmendinger	Kaulig Racing	Chevrolet	15.362	—
23	1	Ross Chastain (P)	Trackhouse Racing	Chevrolet	15.365	—
24	99	Daniel Suárez	Trackhouse Racing	Chevrolet	15.367	—
25	47	Ricky Stenhouse Jr. (P)	JTG Daugherty Racing	Chevrolet	15.372	—
26	10	Aric Almirola	Stewart-Haas Racing	Ford	15.372	—
27	51	Ryan Newman	Rick Ware Racing	Ford	15.414	—
28	22	Joey Logano (P)	Team Penske	Ford	15.416	—
29	2	Austin Cindric	Team Penske	Ford	15.427	—
30	38	Todd Gilliland	Front Row Motorsports	Ford	15.433	—
31	43	Erik Jones	Legacy Motor Club	Chevrolet	15.494	—
32	21	Harrison Burton	Wood Brothers Racing	Ford	15.538	—
33	77	Ty Dillon	Spire Motorsports	Chevrolet	15.538	—
34	78	B. J. McLeod (i)	Live Fast Motorsports	Chevrolet	15.610	—
35	15	J. J. Yeley (i)	Rick Ware Racing	Ford	15.793	—
36	5	Kyle Larson (P)	Hendrick Motorsports	Chevrolet	15.942	—
Official qualifying results

== Race ==
=== Race results ===
==== Stage results ====
Stage One Laps: 125

Pos	No	Driver	Team	Manufacturer	Points
1	20	Christopher Bell (P)	Joe Gibbs Racing	Toyota	10
2	7	Corey LaJoie	Spire Motorsports	Chevrolet	9
3	23	Bubba Wallace (P)	23XI Racing	Toyota	8
4	24	William Byron (P)	Hendrick Motorsports	Chevrolet	7
5	45	Tyler Reddick (P)	23XI Racing	Toyota	6
6	1	Ross Chastain (P)	Trackhouse Racing	Chevrolet	5
7	6	Brad Keselowski (P)	RFK Racing	Ford	4
8	5	Kyle Larson (P)	Hendrick Motorsports	Chevrolet	3
9	19	Martin Truex Jr. (P)	Joe Gibbs Racing	Toyota	2
10	54	Ty Gibbs (R)	Joe Gibbs Racing	Toyota	1
Official stage one results

Stage Two Laps: 125

Pos	No	Driver	Team	Manufacturer	Points
1	20	Christopher Bell (P)	Joe Gibbs Racing	Toyota	10
2	54	Ty Gibbs (R)	Joe Gibbs Racing	Toyota	9
3	5	Kyle Larson (P)	Hendrick Motorsports	Chevrolet	8
4	11	Denny Hamlin (P)	Joe Gibbs Racing	Toyota	7
5	42	Carson Hocevar (i)	Legacy Motor Club	Chevrolet	0
6	34	Michael McDowell (P)	Front Row Motorsports	Ford	5
7	17	Chris Buescher (P)	RFK Racing	Ford	4
8	24	William Byron (P)	Hendrick Motorsports	Chevrolet	3
9	41	Ryan Preece	Stewart-Haas Racing	Ford	2
10	9	Chase Elliott (OP)	Hendrick Motorsports	Chevrolet	1
Official stage two results

=== Final Stage results ===
Stage Three Laps: 250

Pos	Grid	No	Driver	Team	Manufacturer	Laps	Points
1	2	11	Denny Hamlin (P)	Joe Gibbs Racing	Toyota	500	47
2	36	5	Kyle Larson (P)	Hendrick Motorsports	Chevrolet	500	46
3	1	20	Christopher Bell (P)	Joe Gibbs Racing	Toyota	500	54
4	20	17	Chris Buescher (P)	RFK Racing	Ford	500	37
5	8	54	Ty Gibbs (R)	Joe Gibbs Racing	Toyota	500	42
6	4	34	Michael McDowell (P)	Front Row Motorsports	Ford	500	36
7	7	9	Chase Elliott (OP)	Hendrick Motorsports	Chevrolet	500	31
8	6	6	Brad Keselowski (P)	RFK Racing	Ford	500	33
9	3	24	William Byron (P)	Hendrick Motorsports	Chevrolet	500	38
10	25	47	Ricky Stenhouse Jr. (P)	JTG Daugherty Racing	Chevrolet	500	27
11	16	42	Carson Hocevar (i)	Legacy Motor Club	Chevrolet	499	0
12	17	41	Ryan Preece	Stewart-Haas Racing	Ford	499	27
13	13	48	Alex Bowman	Hendrick Motorsports	Chevrolet	499	24
14	9	23	Bubba Wallace (P)	23XI Racing	Toyota	499	31
15	12	45	Tyler Reddick (P)	23XI Racing	Toyota	499	28
16	30	38	Todd Gilliland	Front Row Motorsports	Ford	499	21
17	18	3	Austin Dillon	Richard Childress Racing	Chevrolet	499	20
18	26	10	Aric Almirola	Stewart-Haas Racing	Ford	499	19
19	5	19	Martin Truex Jr. (P)	Joe Gibbs Racing	Toyota	498	20
20	15	8	Kyle Busch (P)	Richard Childress Racing	Chevrolet	498	17
21	24	99	Daniel Suárez	Trackhouse Racing	Chevrolet	498	16
22	11	12	Ryan Blaney (P)	Team Penske	Ford	498	15
23	23	1	Ross Chastain (P)	Trackhouse Racing	Chevrolet	498	19
24	31	43	Erik Jones	Legacy Motor Club	Chevrolet	497	13
25	10	7	Corey LaJoie	Spire Motorsports	Chevrolet	497	21
26	35	15	J. J. Yeley (i)	Rick Ware Racing	Ford	495	0
27	14	14	Chase Briscoe	Stewart-Haas Racing	Ford	495	10
28	32	21	Harrison Burton	Wood Brothers Racing	Ford	495	9
29	21	4	Kevin Harvick (P)	Stewart-Haas Racing	Ford	495	8
30	22	16	A. J. Allmendinger	Kaulig Racing	Chevrolet	491	7
31	34	78	B. J. McLeod (i)	Live Fast Motorsports	Chevrolet	490	0
32	29	2	Austin Cindric	Team Penske	Ford	488	5
33	33	77	Ty Dillon	Spire Motorsports	Chevrolet	263	4
34	28	22	Joey Logano (P)	Team Penske	Ford	262	3
35	19	31	Justin Haley	Kaulig Racing	Chevrolet	261	2
36	27	51	Ryan Newman	Rick Ware Racing	Ford	260	1
Official race results

=== Race statistics ===
- Lead changes: 10 among 6 different drivers
- Cautions/Laps: 6 for 53 laps
- Red flags: 1 for 14 minutes
- Time of race: 2 hours, 48 minutes, and 20 seconds
- Average speed: 94.99 miles per hour (152.87 km/h)

== Media ==
=== Television ===
USA covered the race on the television side. Rick Allen, Jeff Burton, Steve Letarte and Dale Earnhardt Jr. called the race from the broadcast booth. Dave Burns, Kim Coon, Dillon Welch and Marty Snider handled the pit road duties from pit lane.

USA
Booth announcers	Pit reporters
Lap-by-lap: Rick Allen; Color-commentator: Jeff Burton; Color-commentator: Steve Letarte; Color-commentator: Dale Earnhardt Jr.	Dave Burns; Kim Coon; Dillon Welch; Marty Snider

=== Radio ===
PRN had the radio call for the race, which was also simulcast on Sirius XM NASCAR Radio. Doug Rice and Mark Garrow called the race from the booth when the field races down the frontstretch. Rob Albright called the race when the field races down the backstretch. Brad Gillie, Brett McMillan, Alan Cavanna, and Wendy Venturini handled the duties on pit lane.

PRN
Booth announcers	Turn announcers	Pit reporters
Lead announcer: Doug Rice; Announcer: Mark Garrow	Backstretch: Rob Albright	Brad Gillie; Brett McMillan; Alan Cavanna; Wendy Venturini

== Standings after the race ==
Drivers' Championship standings

	Pos	Driver	Points
3	1	William Byron	3,036
11	2	Martin Truex Jr.	3,036 (–0)
	3	Denny Hamlin	3,032 (–4)
3	4	Kyle Larson	3,023 (–13)
4	5	Chris Buescher	3,021 (–15)
1	6	Kyle Busch	3,019 (–17)
3	7	Christopher Bell	3,016 (–20)
6	8	Tyler Reddick	3,014 (–22)
1	9	Ross Chastain	3,011 (–25)
5	10	Brad Keselowski	3,011 (–25)
5	11	Ryan Blaney	3,008 (–28)
2	12	Bubba Wallace	3,000 (–36)
2	13	Joey Logano	2,071 (–965)
2	14	Kevin Harvick	2,071 (–965)
	15	Ricky Stenhouse Jr.	2,068 (–968)
	16	Michael McDowell	2,059 (–977)
Official driver's standings

Manufacturers' Championship standings

Pos	Manufacturer	Points
1	Chevrolet	1,070
2	Toyota	1,007 (–63)
3	Ford	994 (–76)

- Note: Only the first 16 positions are included for the driver standings.

Previous race: 2023 Hollywood Casino 400	NASCAR Cup Series; 2023 season	Next race: 2023 Autotrader EchoPark Automotive 400
