= 2023 Busch Light Clash at The Coliseum =

Non-points exhibition NASCAR race

Race details
- Race 1 of 2 exhibition races in the 2023 NASCAR Cup Series
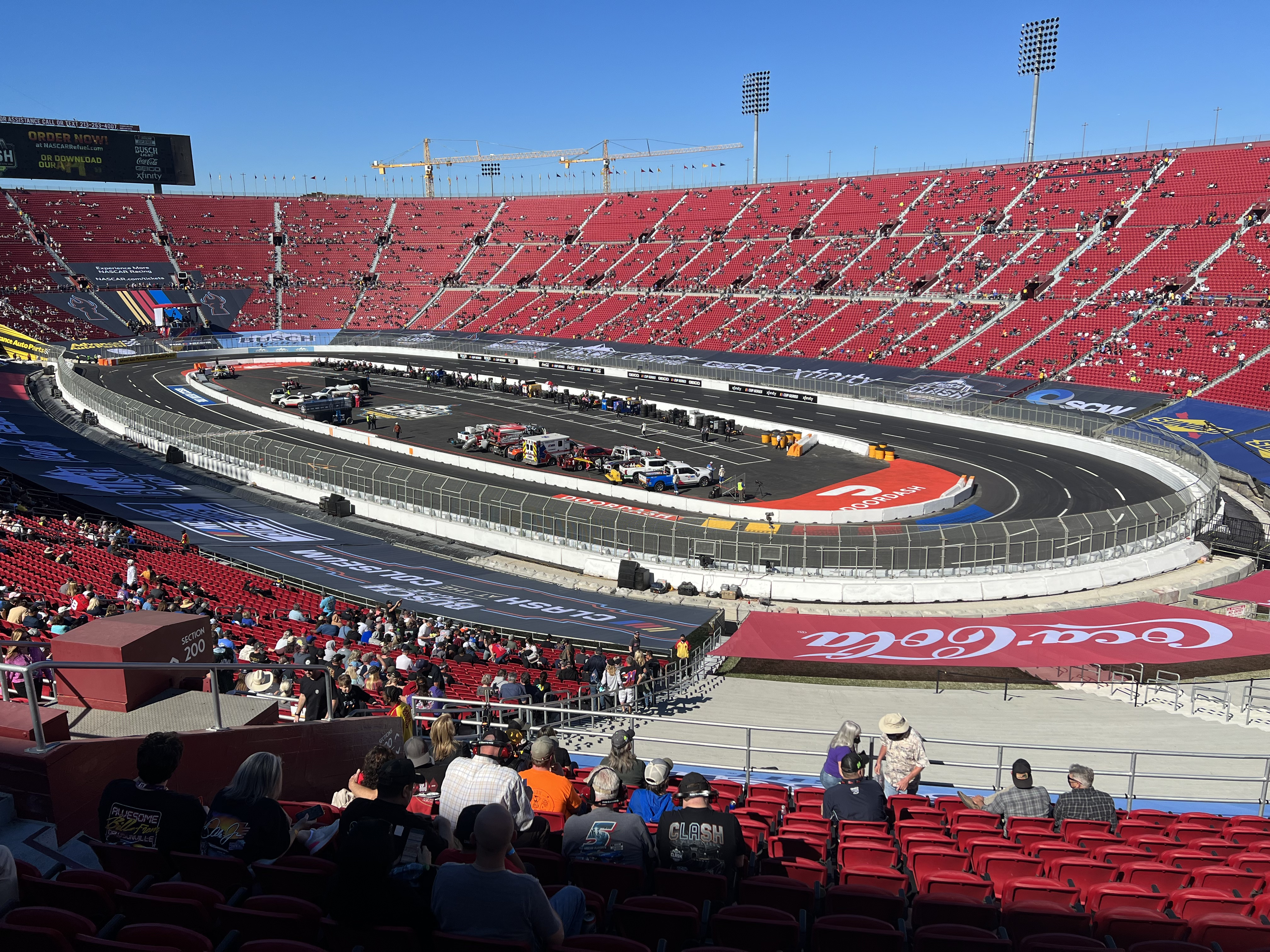
- Date: February 5, 2023
- Location: Los Angeles Memorial Coliseum in Los Angeles, California
- Course: Temporary race course in permanent stadium
- Course length: 0.25 miles (0.40 km)
- Distance: 150 laps, 37.5 mi (60 km)
- Average speed: 21.831 miles per hour (35.134 km/h)

Pole position
Driver	Aric Almirola	Stewart-Haas Racing

Most laps led
Driver	Ryan Preece	Stewart-Haas Racing
- Laps: 43

Winner
No. 19	Martin Truex Jr.	Joe Gibbs Racing

Television in the United States
- Network: Fox
- Announcers: Mike Joy, Clint Bowyer, Jimmie Johnson, and Tony Stewart

Radio in the United States
- Radio: MRN
- Booth announcers: Alex Hayden and Jeff Striegle
- Turn announcers: Dan Hubbard (Backstretch)

The 2023 Busch Light Clash at The Coliseum was a NASCAR Cup Series race held on February 5, 2023, at Los Angeles Memorial Coliseum in Los Angeles, California. Contested over 150 laps, it was the first exhibition race of the 2023 NASCAR Cup Series season.

== Format and eligibility ==
On September 14, 2021, NASCAR announced that the Busch Clash would move to the Los Angeles Memorial Coliseum. On December 22, 2022, the format for the 2023 Clash was announced:

- The event is open for all teams and drivers.
- A total of 350 laps in six races.
- The 36 charter teams and up to four open teams will participate in qualifying. Should more than 40 teams enter the race, it is unknown if qualifying will determine who advances to heat races.
- Based on lap times, cars are put in one of four heat races of 25 laps each. The top five drivers in each heat advance to the feature.
- All non qualifying drivers are assigned to one of two 50 lap heat races. The top three drivers in each heat advance to the feature.
- The highest driver in 2022 Cup Series points standings not in will also advance to the feature in the last position.
- The feature is 150 laps and will have 27 cars start the race.

=== Entry list ===
- (R) denotes rookie driver.
- (i) denotes driver who is ineligible for series driver points.

No.	Driver	Team	Manufacturer
1	Ross Chastain	Trackhouse Racing	Chevrolet
2	Austin Cindric	Team Penske	Ford
3	Austin Dillon	Richard Childress Racing	Chevrolet
4	Kevin Harvick	Stewart-Haas Racing	Ford
5	Kyle Larson	Hendrick Motorsports	Chevrolet
6	Brad Keselowski	RFK Racing	Ford
7	Corey LaJoie	Spire Motorsports	Chevrolet
8	Kyle Busch	Richard Childress Racing	Chevrolet
9	Chase Elliott	Hendrick Motorsports	Chevrolet
10	Aric Almirola	Stewart-Haas Racing	Ford
11	Denny Hamlin	Joe Gibbs Racing	Toyota
12	Ryan Blaney	Team Penske	Ford
14	Chase Briscoe	Stewart-Haas Racing	Ford
15	J. J. Yeley	Rick Ware Racing	Ford
16	A. J. Allmendinger	Kaulig Racing	Chevrolet
17	Chris Buescher	RFK Racing	Ford
19	Martin Truex Jr.	Joe Gibbs Racing	Toyota
20	Christopher Bell	Joe Gibbs Racing	Toyota
21	Harrison Burton	Wood Brothers Racing	Ford
22	Joey Logano	Team Penske	Ford
23	Bubba Wallace	23XI Racing	Toyota
24	William Byron	Hendrick Motorsports	Chevrolet
31	Justin Haley	Kaulig Racing	Chevrolet
34	Michael McDowell	Front Row Motorsports	Ford
38	Todd Gilliland	Front Row Motorsports	Ford
41	Ryan Preece	Stewart-Haas Racing	Ford
42	Noah Gragson (R)	Legacy Motor Club	Chevrolet
43	Erik Jones	Legacy Motor Club	Chevrolet
45	Tyler Reddick	23XI Racing	Toyota
47	Ricky Stenhouse Jr.	JTG Daugherty Racing	Chevrolet
48	Alex Bowman	Hendrick Motorsports	Chevrolet
51	Cody Ware	Rick Ware Racing	Ford
54	Ty Gibbs (R)	Joe Gibbs Racing	Toyota
77	Ty Dillon	Spire Motorsports	Chevrolet
78	B. J. McLeod	Live Fast Motorsports	Chevrolet
99	Daniel Suárez	Trackhouse Racing	Chevrolet
Official entry list

== Practice ==
Martin Truex Jr. was the fastest in the practice session with a time of 13.361 with an average speed of 67.360 mph (108.405 km/h) .

=== Practice results ===
Pos	No.	Driver	Team	Manufacturer	Time	Speed
1	19	Martin Truex Jr.	Joe Gibbs Racing	Toyota	13.361	67.360
2	23	Bubba Wallace	23XI Racing	Toyota	13.371	67.310
3	14	Chase Briscoe	Stewart-Haas Racing	Ford	13.383	67.250
Official practice results

== Qualifying ==
Justin Haley scored the pole for the first heat race with a time of 13.413 and a speed of 67.099 mph (107.985 km/h).

=== Qualifying results ===
Pos	No.	Driver	Team	Manufacturer	Time
1	31	Justin Haley	Kaulig Racing	Chevrolet	13.413
2	8	Kyle Busch	Richard Childress Racing	Chevrolet	13.553
3	20	Christopher Bell	Joe Gibbs Racing	Toyota	13.569
4	24	William Byron	Hendrick Motorsports	Chevrolet	13.596
5	10	Aric Almirola	Stewart-Haas Racing	Ford	13.600
6	3	Austin Dillon	Richard Childress Racing	Chevrolet	13.605
7	11	Denny Hamlin	Joe Gibbs Racing	Toyota	13.621
8	16	A. J. Allmendinger	Kaulig Racing	Chevrolet	13.623
9	48	Alex Bowman	Hendrick Motorsports	Chevrolet	13.624
10	5	Kyle Larson	Hendrick Motorsports	Chevrolet	13.638
11	99	Daniel Suárez	Trackhouse Racing	Chevrolet	13.663
12	1	Ross Chastain	Trackhouse Racing	Chevrolet	13.683
13	21	Harrison Burton	Wood Brothers Racing	Ford	13.714
14	4	Kevin Harvick	Stewart-Haas Racing	Ford	13.734
15	14	Chase Briscoe	Stewart-Haas Racing	Ford	13.735
16	23	Bubba Wallace	23XI Racing	Toyota	13.742
17	22	Joey Logano	Team Penske	Ford	13.749
18	47	Ricky Stenhouse Jr.	JTG Daugherty Racing	Chevrolet	13.767
19	45	Tyler Reddick	23XI Racing	Toyota	13.793
20	43	Erik Jones	Legacy Motor Club	Chevrolet	13.817
21	42	Noah Gragson (R)	Legacy Motor Club	Chevrolet	13.823
22	19	Martin Truex Jr.	Joe Gibbs Racing	Toyota	13.851
23	6	Brad Keselowski	RFK Racing	Ford	13.863
24	41	Ryan Preece	Stewart-Haas Racing	Ford	13.870
25	34	Michael McDowell	Front Row Motorsports	Ford	13.890
26	2	Austin Cindric	Team Penske	Ford	13.910
27	38	Todd Gilliland	Front Row Motorsports	Ford	13.915
28	7	Corey LaJoie	Spire Motorsports	Chevrolet	13.919
29	17	Chris Buescher	RFK Racing	Ford	13.935
30	9	Chase Elliott	Hendrick Motorsports	Chevrolet	14.087
31	15	J. J. Yeley	Rick Ware Racing	Ford	14.254
32	51	Cody Ware	Rick Ware Racing	Ford	14.316
33	77	Ty Dillon	Spire Motorsports	Chevrolet	14.489
34	78	B. J. McLeod	Live Fast Motorsports	Chevrolet	15.308
35	12	Ryan Blaney	Team Penske	Ford	40.301
36	54	Ty Gibbs (R)	Joe Gibbs Racing	Toyota	0.000
Official qualifying results

== Qualifying heat races ==
Aric Almirola scored the pole for the race after winning the first qualifying heat race.

=== Race 1 ===
Pos	Grid	No	Driver	Team	Manufacturer	Laps
1	2	10	Aric Almirola	Stewart-Haas Racing	Ford	25
2	3	48	Alex Bowman	Hendrick Motorsports	Chevrolet	25
3	1	31	Justin Haley	Kaulig Racing	Chevrolet	25
4	6	42	Noah Gragson (R)	Legacy Motor Club	Chevrolet	25
5	5	22	Joey Logano	Team Penske	Ford	25
6	7	34	Michael McDowell	Front Row Motorsports	Ford	25
7	4	21	Harrison Burton	Wood Brothers Racing	Ford	25
8	9	77	Ty Dillon	Spire Motorsports	Chevrolet	25
9	8	17	Chris Buescher	RFK Racing	Ford	25
Official heat race 1 results

=== Race 2 ===
Pos	Grid	No	Driver	Team	Manufacturer	Laps
1	6	19	Martin Truex Jr.	Joe Gibbs Racing	Toyota	25
2	1	8	Kyle Busch	Richard Childress Racing	Chevrolet	25
3	2	3	Austin Dillon	Richard Childress Racing	Chevrolet	25
4	3	5	Kyle Larson	Hendrick Motorsports	Chevrolet	25
5	4	4	Kevin Harvick	Stewart-Haas Racing	Ford	25
6	8	9	Chase Elliott	Hendrick Motorsports	Chevrolet	25
7	5	47	Ricky Stenhouse Jr.	JTG Daugherty Racing	Chevrolet	25
8	7	2	Austin Cindric	Team Penske	Ford	25
9	9	78	B. J. McLeod	Live Fast Motorsports	Chevrolet	25
Official heat race 2 results

=== Race 3 ===
Pos	Grid	No	Driver	Team	Manufacturer	Laps
1	2	11	Denny Hamlin	Joe Gibbs Racing	Toyota	25
2	4	14	Chase Briscoe	Stewart-Haas Racing	Ford	25
3	5	45	Tyler Reddick	23XI Racing	Toyota	25
4	9	12	Ryan Blaney	Team Penske	Ford	25
5	3	99	Daniel Suárez	Trackhouse Racing	Chevrolet	25
6	1	20	Christopher Bell	Joe Gibbs Racing	Toyota	25
7	7	38	Todd Gilliland	Front Row Motorsports	Ford	25
8	6	6	Brad Keselowski	RFK Racing	Ford	25
9	8	15	J. J. Yeley	Rick Ware Racing	Ford	25
Official heat race 3 results

=== Race 4 ===
Pos	Grid	No	Driver	Team	Manufacturer	Laps
1	1	24	William Byron	Hendrick Motorsports	Chevrolet	25
2	4	23	Bubba Wallace	23XI Racing	Toyota	25
3	3	1	Ross Chastain	Trackhouse Racing	Chevrolet	25
4	6	41	Ryan Preece	Stewart-Haas Racing	Ford	25
5	5	43	Erik Jones	Legacy Motor Club	Chevrolet	25
6	2	16	A. J. Allmendinger	Kaulig Racing	Chevrolet	25
7	9	54	Ty Gibbs (R)	Joe Gibbs Racing	Toyota	25
8	7	7	Corey LaJoie	Spire Motorsports	Chevrolet	25
9	8	51	Cody Ware	Rick Ware Racing	Ford	25
Official heat race 4 results

=== "Last Chance" qualifying race 1 ===
Pos	Grid	No	Driver	Team	Manufacturer	Laps
1	1	34	Michael McDowell	Front Row Motorsports	Ford	50
2	2	20	Christopher Bell	Joe Gibbs Racing	Toyota	50
3	4	38	Todd Gilliland	Front Row Motorsports	Ford	50
4	3	21	Harrison Burton	Wood Brothers Racing	Ford	50
5	6	6	Brad Keselowski	RFK Racing	Ford	50
6	5	77	Ty Dillon	Spire Motorsports	Chevrolet	50
7	7	17	Chris Buescher	RFK Racing	Ford	50
8	8	15	J. J. Yeley	Rick Ware Racing	Ford	49
Official last chance race 1 results

=== "Last Chance" qualifying race 2 ===
Pos	Grid	No	Driver	Team	Manufacturer	Laps
1	1	9	Chase Elliott	Hendrick Motorsports	Chevrolet	50
2	2	54	Ty Gibbs (R)	Joe Gibbs Racing	Toyota	50
3	4	16	A. J. Allmendinger	Kaulig Racing	Chevrolet	50
4	3	47	Ricky Stenhouse Jr.	JTG Daugherty Racing	Chevrolet	50
5	5	2	Austin Cindric	Team Penske	Ford	50
6	6	7	Corey LaJoie	Spire Motorsports	Chevrolet	50
7	8	51	Cody Ware	Rick Ware Racing	Ford	49
8	7	78	B. J. McLeod	Live Fast Motorsports	Chevrolet	48
Official last chance race 2 results

=== Starting lineup ===
Pos	No.	Driver	Team	Manufacturer
1	10	Aric Almirola	Stewart-Haas Racing	Ford
2	19	Martin Truex Jr.	Joe Gibbs Racing	Toyota
3	11	Denny Hamlin	Joe Gibbs Racing	Toyota
4	24	William Byron	Hendrick Motorsports	Chevrolet
5	48	Alex Bowman	Hendrick Motorsports	Chevrolet
6	8	Kyle Busch	Richard Childress Racing	Chevrolet
7	14	Chase Briscoe	Stewart-Haas Racing	Ford
8	23	Bubba Wallace	23XI Racing	Toyota
9	31	Justin Haley	Kaulig Racing	Chevrolet
10	3	Austin Dillon	Richard Childress Racing	Chevrolet
11	45	Tyler Reddick	23XI Racing	Toyota
12	1	Ross Chastain	Trackhouse Racing	Chevrolet
13	42	Noah Gragson (R)	Legacy Motor Club	Chevrolet
14	5	Kyle Larson	Hendrick Motorsports	Chevrolet
15	12	Ryan Blaney	Team Penske	Ford
16	41	Ryan Preece	Stewart-Haas Racing	Ford
17	22	Joey Logano	Team Penske	Ford
18	4	Kevin Harvick	Stewart-Haas Racing	Ford
19	99	Daniel Suárez	Trackhouse Racing	Chevrolet
20	43	Erik Jones	Legacy Motor Club	Chevrolet
21	34	Michael McDowell	Front Row Motorsports	Ford
22	9	Chase Elliott	Hendrick Motorsports	Chevrolet
23	20	Christopher Bell	Joe Gibbs Racing	Toyota
24	54	Ty Gibbs (R)	Joe Gibbs Racing	Toyota
25	38	Todd Gilliland	Front Row Motorsports	Ford
26	16	A. J. Allmendinger	Kaulig Racing	Chevrolet
27	2	Austin Cindric	Team Penske	Ford
Official starting lineup

== Race ==
=== Race results ===
Pos	Grid	No	Driver	Team	Manufacturer	Laps
1	2	19	Martin Truex Jr.	Joe Gibbs Racing	Toyota	150
2	10	3	Austin Dillon	Richard Childress Racing	Chevrolet	150
3	6	8	Kyle Busch	Richard Childress Racing	Chevrolet	150
4	5	48	Alex Bowman	Hendrick Motorsports	Chevrolet	150
5	14	5	Kyle Larson	Hendrick Motorsports	Chevrolet	150
6	11	45	Tyler Reddick	23XI Racing	Toyota	150
7	16	41	Ryan Preece	Stewart-Haas Racing	Ford	150
8	12	1	Ross Chastain	Trackhouse Racing	Chevrolet	150
9	3	11	Denny Hamlin	Joe Gibbs Racing	Toyota	150
10	4	24	William Byron	Hendrick Motorsports	Chevrolet	150
11	9	31	Justin Haley	Kaulig Racing	Chevrolet	150
12	18	4	Kevin Harvick	Stewart-Haas Racing	Ford	150
13	23	20	Christopher Bell	Joe Gibbs Racing	Toyota	150
14	13	42	Noah Gragson (R)	Legacy Motor Club	Chevrolet	150
15	7	14	Chase Briscoe	Stewart-Haas Racing	Ford	150
16	17	22	Joey Logano	Team Penske	Ford	150
17	15	12	Ryan Blaney	Team Penske	Ford	150
18	1	10	Aric Almirola	Stewart-Haas Racing	Ford	150
19	19	99	Daniel Suárez	Trackhouse Racing	Chevrolet	150
20	26	16	A. J. Allmendinger	Kaulig Racing	Chevrolet	150
21	22	9	Chase Elliott	Hendrick Motorsports	Chevrolet	150
22	8	23	Bubba Wallace	23XI Racing	Toyota	150
23	25	38	Todd Gilliland	Front Row Motorsports	Ford	140
24	21	34	Michael McDowell	Front Row Motorsports	Ford	137
25	27	2	Austin Cindric	Team Penske	Ford	106
26	24	54	Ty Gibbs (R)	Joe Gibbs Racing	Toyota	81
27	20	43	Erik Jones	Legacy Motor Club	Chevrolet	16
Official race results

== Media ==
=== Television ===
Fox covered the race on the television side. Mike Joy, Clint Bowyer, seven-time NASCAR Cup Series champion and owner of Legacy Motor Club, Jimmie Johnson and three-time NASCAR Cup Series champion and co-owner of Stewart-Haas Racing, Tony Stewart handled the call in the booth for the race, while pit reporters Jamie Little and Regan Smith as well as Larry McReynolds handled interviews. Chris Myers and Jamie McMurray were the host and analyst in the studio.

Fox
Booth announcers	Reporters	Studio
Lap-by-lap: Mike Joy; Color-commentator: Clint Bowyer; Color-commentator: Tony Stewart Color-commentator: Jimmie Johnson	Jamie Little; Regan Smith; Larry McReynolds	Host: Chris Myers; Analyst: Jamie McMurray

=== Radio ===
MRN covered the radio call for the race, which was also simulcast on Sirius XM NASCAR Radio. Alex Hayden and Jeff Striegle called the action from the broadcast booth when the field raced down the front straightaway. Dan Hubbard called the action for MRN when the field raced down the backstretch. Steve Post, Kim Coon, Brienne Pedigo, and Jason Toy covered the action for MRN on pit lane.

MRN Radio
Booth announcers	Turn announcers	Pit reporters
Lead announcer: Alex Hayden; Announcer: Jeff Striegle	Backstretch: Dan Hubbard	Steve Post; Kim Coon; Brienne Pedigo; Jason Toy
