= 2023 NASCAR Cup Series =

American motorsport season

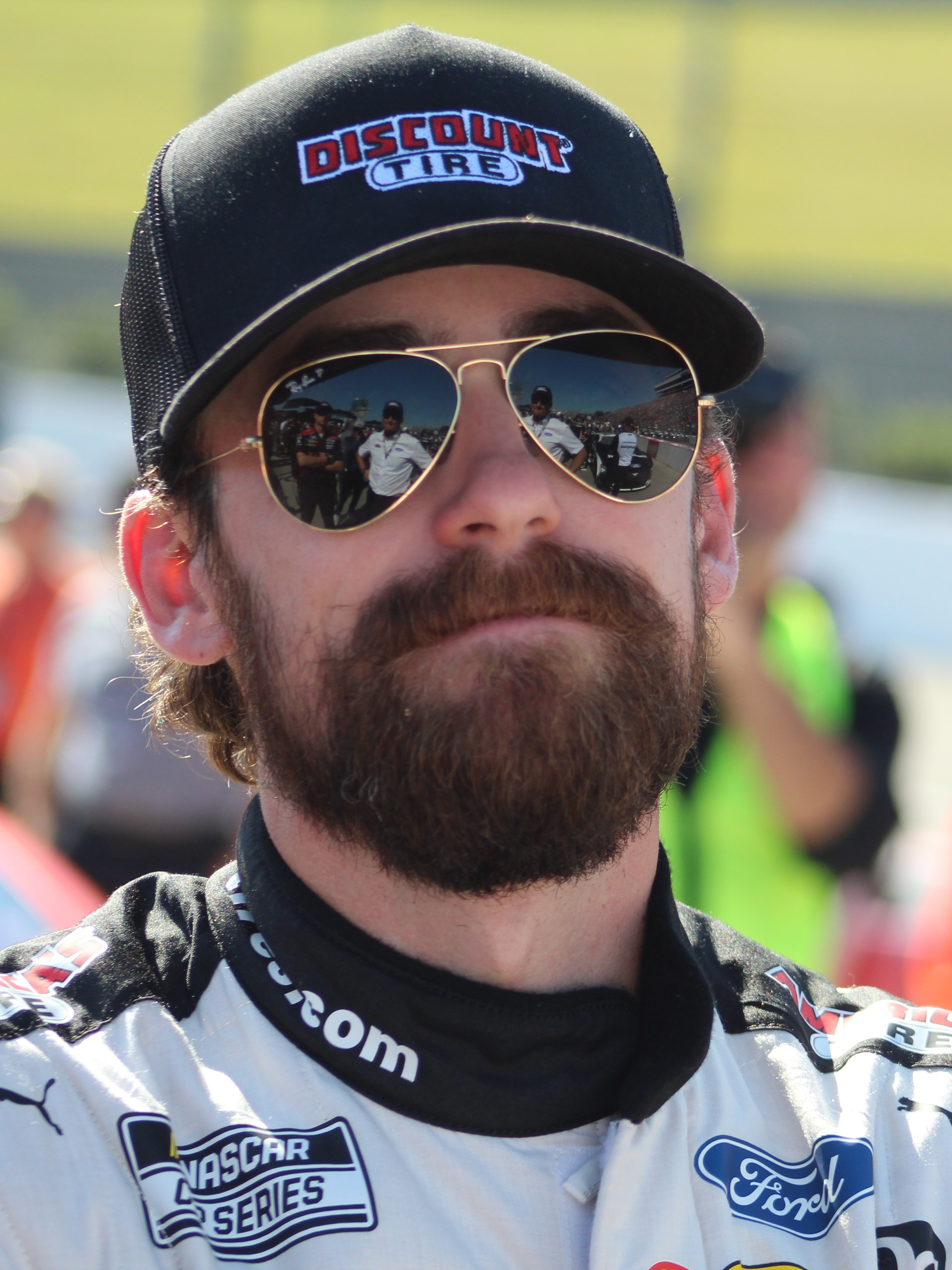
Ryan Blaney, the 2023 NASCAR Cup Series champion.

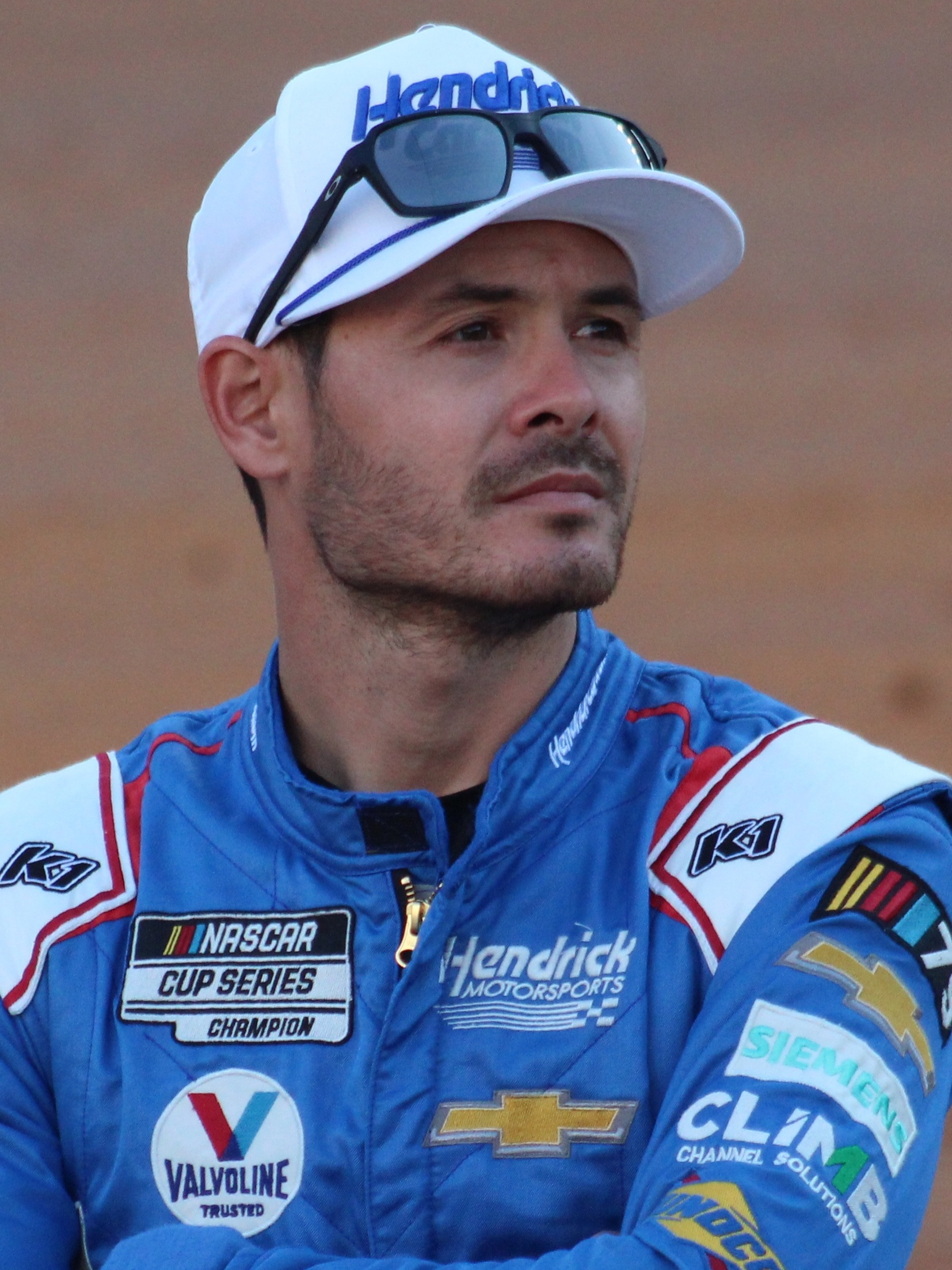
Kyle Larson, finished second behind Blaney in the championship.

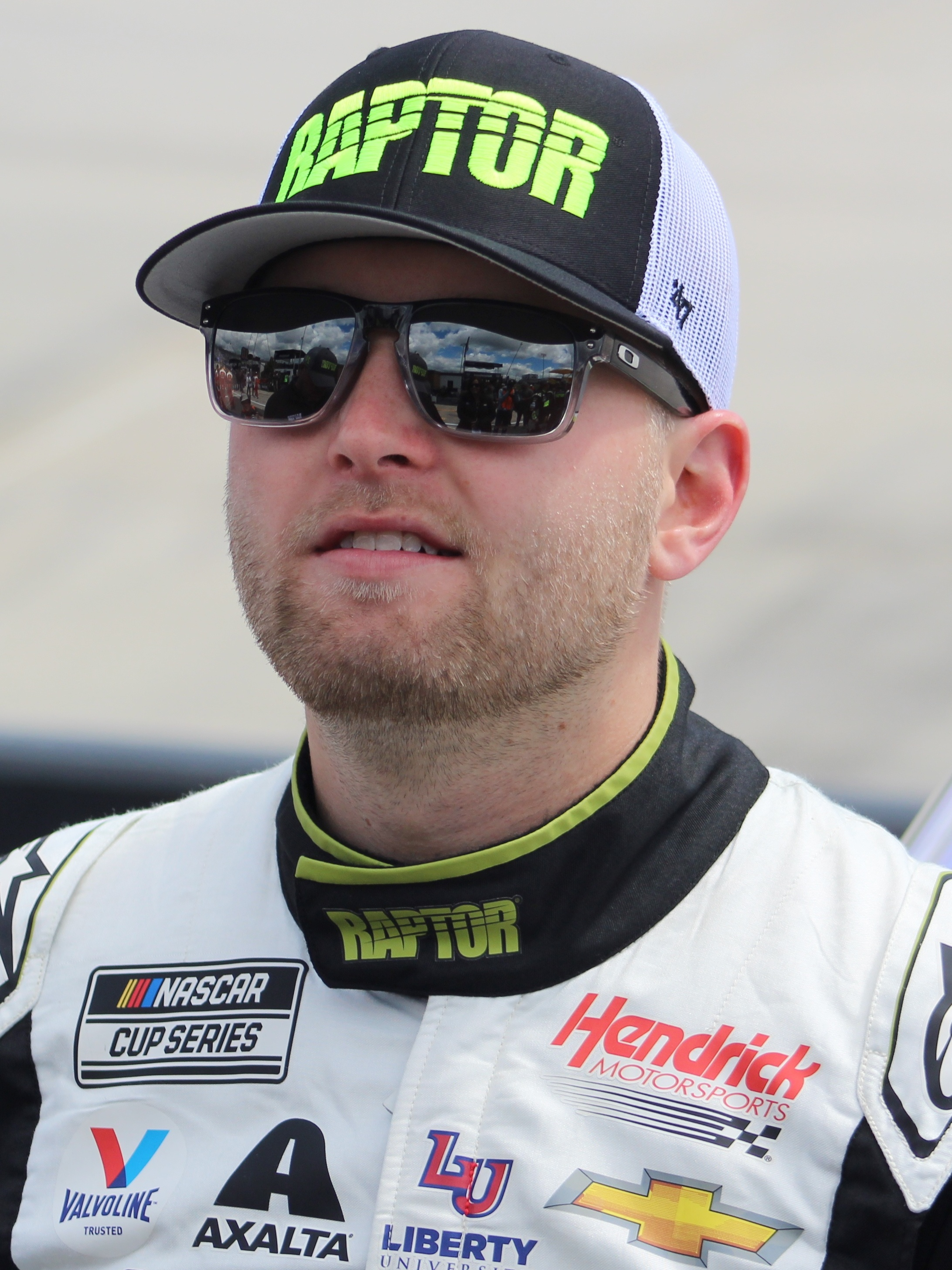
William Byron, finished third in the championship.

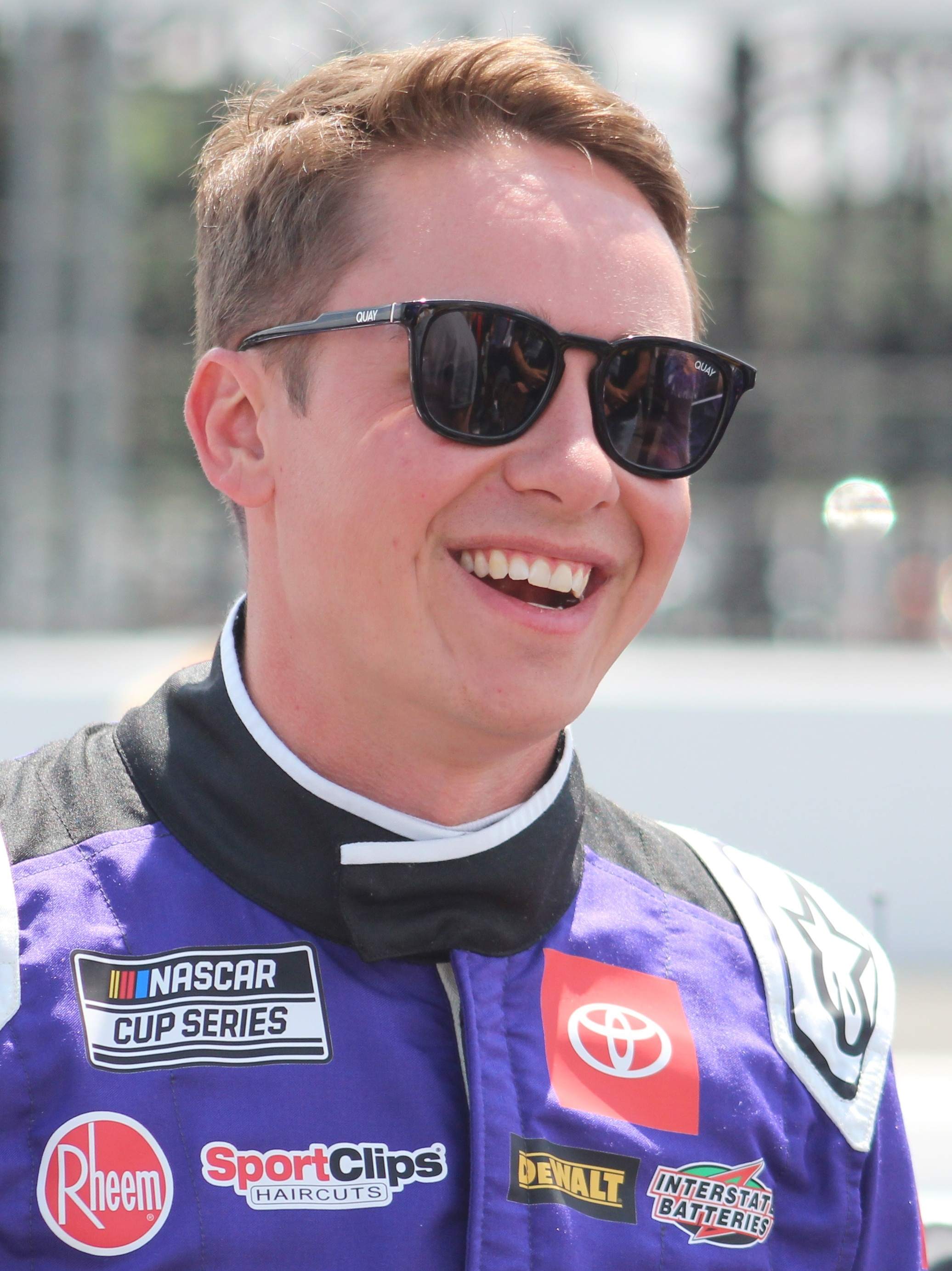
Christopher Bell, finished fourth in the championship.

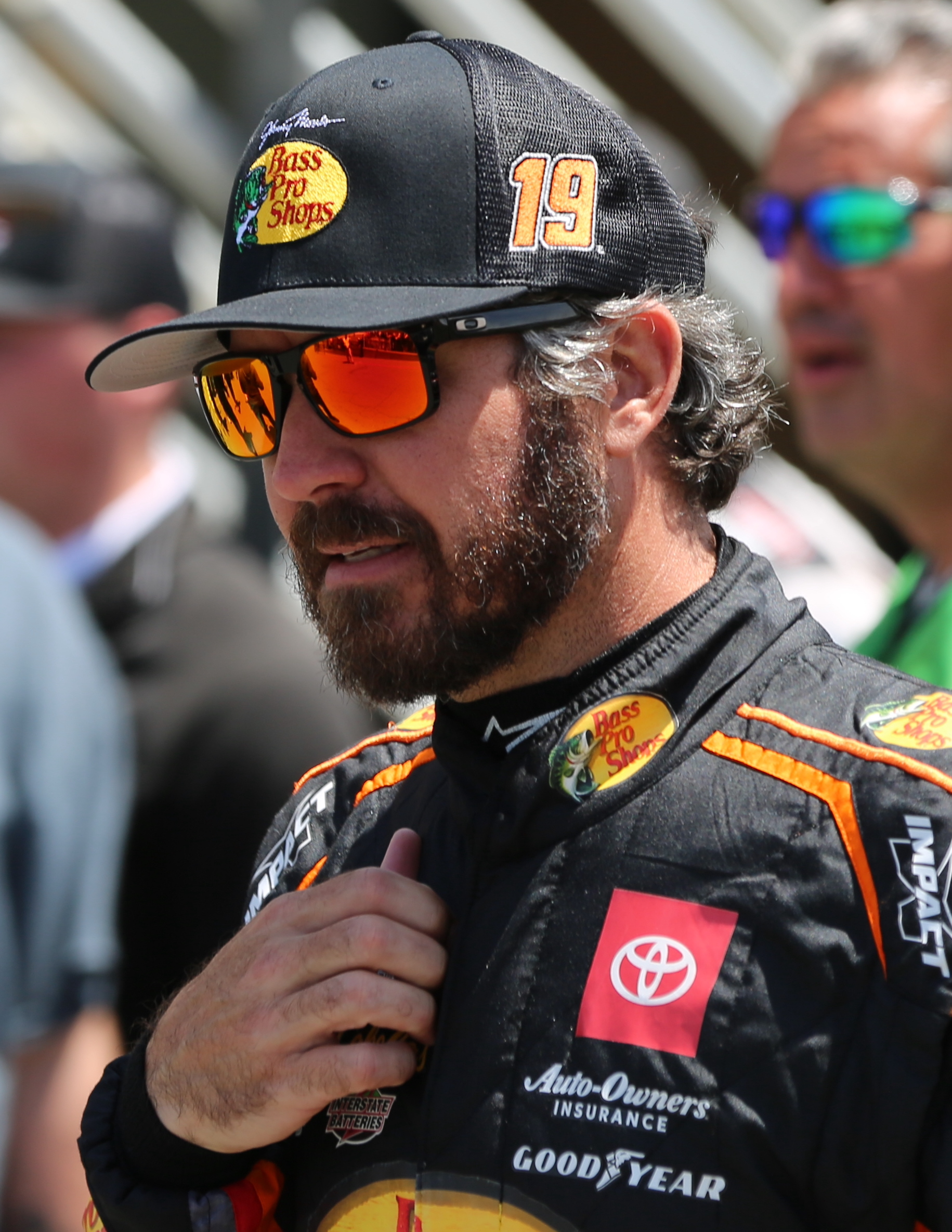
Martin Truex Jr. won the regular season championship, but finished eleventh in the championship.

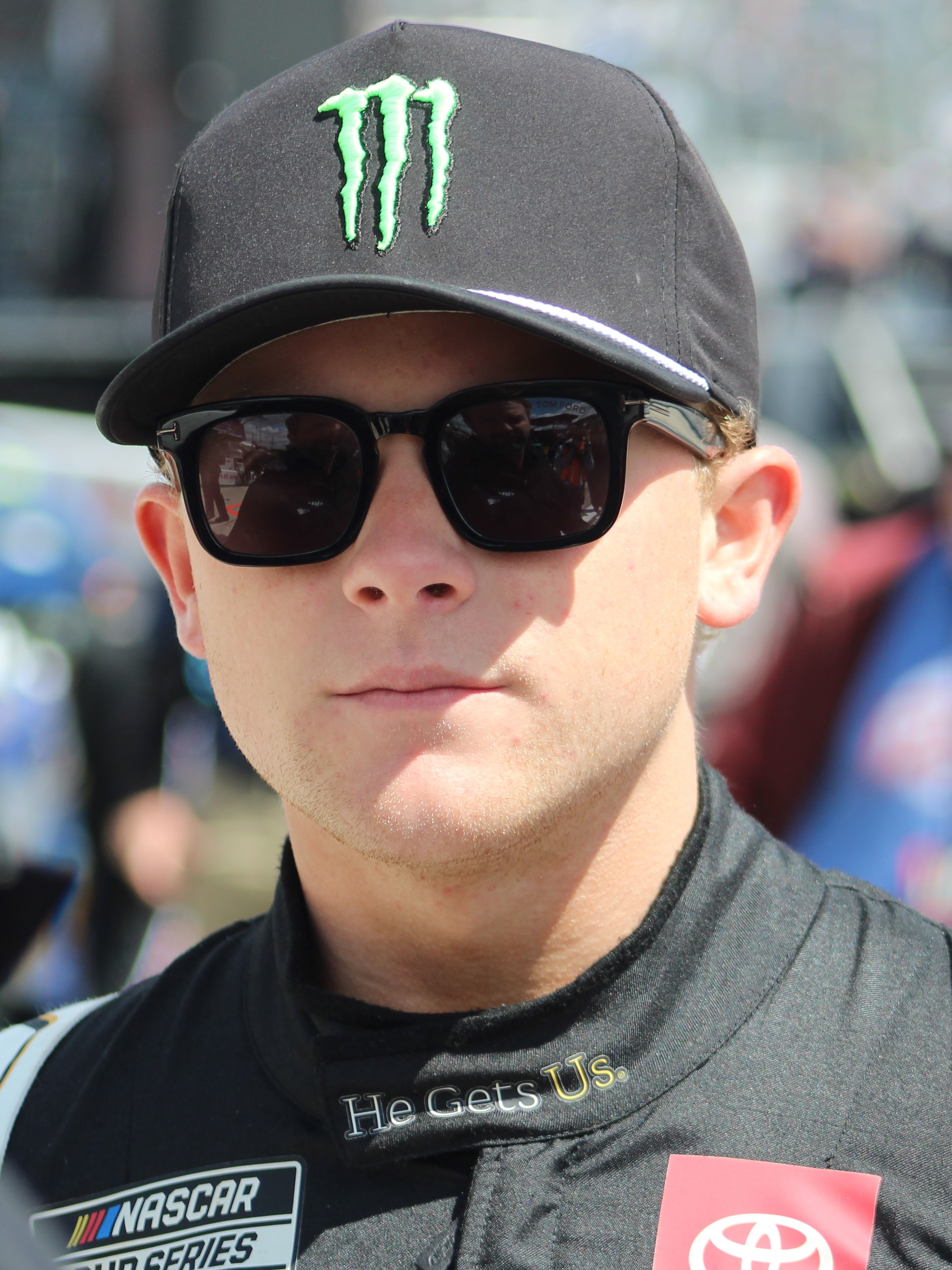
Ty Gibbs, the 2023 NASCAR Rookie of the Year.

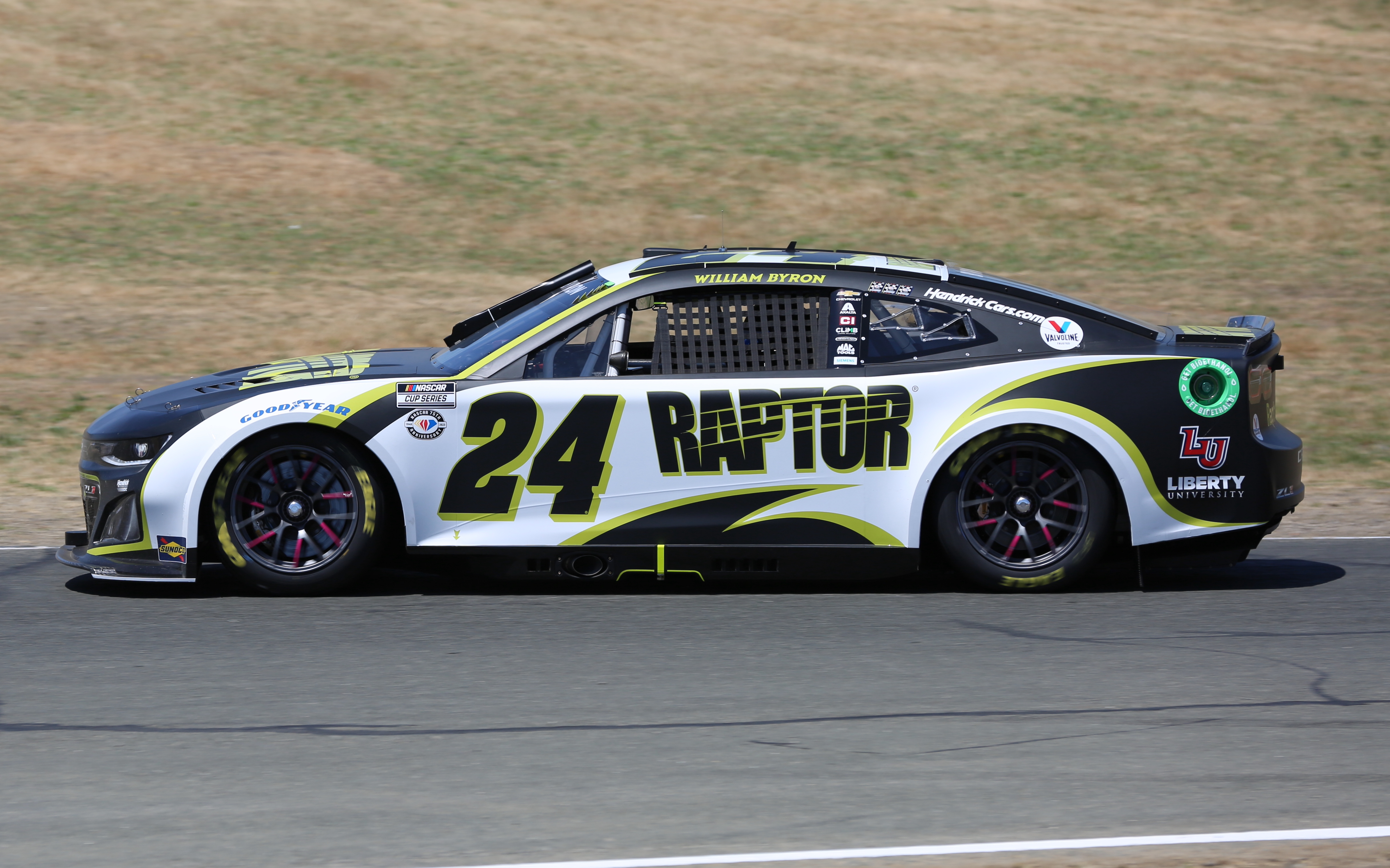
Chevrolet won the 2023 manufacturers' championship with 1328 points and 18 wins.

The 2023 NASCAR Cup Series was the 75th season for NASCAR professional stock car racing in the United States and the 52nd season for the modern-era Cup Series. The season started with the Busch Light Clash at the Los Angeles Memorial Coliseum on February 5. That race was followed by the Daytona Duel qualifying races and the 65th running of the Daytona 500 (the first points race of the season) on February 19, both at Daytona International Speedway. The season ended with the NASCAR Cup Series Championship Race at Phoenix Raceway on November 5.

This was the final season for 2014 champion and Stewart–Haas Racing driver Kevin Harvick, who announced his plans to retire at the end of the season on January 12, 2023. This was also the first season since 1999 without 2004 champion Kurt Busch, who announced on October 15, 2022, that he would retire from full-time Cup Series competition. On August 26, 2023, Busch announced his complete retirement from the Cup Series.

Following the 2023 Coke Zero Sugar 400 at Daytona, Martin Truex Jr. of Joe Gibbs Racing clinched the regular season championship. Ty Gibbs, also of Joe Gibbs Racing, won NASCAR Rookie of the Year honors after Noah Gragson was suspended and released from Legacy Motor Club in August 2023. Prior to the Xfinity 500 at Martinsville, Chevrolet claimed its 42nd Manufacturers' Championship. At season's end, Ryan Blaney of Team Penske won the 2023 championship.

== Teams and drivers ==
=== Chartered teams ===
Manufacturer	Team	No.	Driver	Crew chief
Chevrolet	Hendrick Motorsports	5	Kyle Larson	Cliff Daniels 32; Kevin Meendering 4
Chevrolet	Hendrick Motorsports	9	Chase Elliott 29	Alan Gustafson 32; Tom Gray 4
Chevrolet	Hendrick Motorsports	9	Josh Berry 5	Alan Gustafson 32; Tom Gray 4
Chevrolet	Hendrick Motorsports	9	Jordan Taylor 1	Alan Gustafson 32; Tom Gray 4
Chevrolet	Hendrick Motorsports	9	Corey LaJoie 1 (Note: Corey LaJoie ran the full season split between the No. 7 Spire Motorsports car and the No. 9 Hendrick Motorsports car.)	Alan Gustafson 32; Tom Gray 4
Chevrolet	Hendrick Motorsports	24	William Byron	Rudy Fugle 32; Brian Campe 4
Chevrolet	Hendrick Motorsports	48	Alex Bowman 33	Blake Harris 32; Greg Ives 4
Chevrolet	Hendrick Motorsports	48	Josh Berry 3	Blake Harris 32; Greg Ives 4
Chevrolet	JTG Daugherty Racing	47	Ricky Stenhouse Jr.	Mike Kelley
Chevrolet	Kaulig Racing	16	A. J. Allmendinger	Matt Swiderski
Chevrolet	Kaulig Racing	31	Justin Haley	Trent Owens 32; Eddie Pardue 4
Chevrolet	Legacy Motor Club	42	Noah Gragson (R) 21	Luke Lambert
Chevrolet	Legacy Motor Club	42	Grant Enfinger 1	Luke Lambert
Chevrolet	Legacy Motor Club	42	Josh Berry 2	Luke Lambert
Chevrolet	Legacy Motor Club	42	Mike Rockenfeller 3	Luke Lambert
Chevrolet	Legacy Motor Club	42	Carson Hocevar 8	Luke Lambert
Chevrolet	Legacy Motor Club	42	John Hunter Nemechek 1	Luke Lambert
Chevrolet	Legacy Motor Club	43	Erik Jones	Dave Elenz 34; Joey Cohen 1 Danny Efland 1
Chevrolet	Live Fast Motorsports	78	B. J. McLeod 23	George Ingram
Chevrolet	Live Fast Motorsports	78	Josh Bilicki 10	George Ingram
Chevrolet	Live Fast Motorsports	78	Anthony Alfredo 2	George Ingram
Chevrolet	Live Fast Motorsports	78	Sheldon Creed 1	George Ingram
Chevrolet	Richard Childress Racing	3	Austin Dillon	Keith Rodden 34; Justin Alexander 2
Chevrolet	Richard Childress Racing	8	Kyle Busch	Randall Burnett
Chevrolet	Spire Motorsports	7	Corey LaJoie 35	Ryan Sparks
Chevrolet	Spire Motorsports	7	Carson Hocevar 1	Ryan Sparks
Chevrolet	Spire Motorsports	77	Ty Dillon	Kevin Bellicourt 20; Kevin Manion 15; Peter Sospenzo 1
Chevrolet	Trackhouse Racing	1	Ross Chastain	Phil Surgen
Chevrolet	Trackhouse Racing	99	Daniel Suárez	Travis Mack
Ford	Front Row Motorsports	34	Michael McDowell	Travis Peterson
Ford	Front Row Motorsports	38	Todd Gilliland 30 (Note: Todd Gilliland ran the full season split between the No. 38 and 36 Front Row Motorsports cars and the No. 15 and 51 Rick Ware Racing cars.)	Ryan Bergenty
Ford	Front Row Motorsports	38	Zane Smith 6	Ryan Bergenty
Ford	RFK Racing	6	Brad Keselowski	Matt McCall
Ford	RFK Racing	17	Chris Buescher	Scott Graves
Ford	Rick Ware Racing	15	Riley Herbst 2	Billy Plourde 31; Jerry Kelley 5
Ford	Rick Ware Racing	15	J. J. Yeley 18	Billy Plourde 31; Jerry Kelley 5
Ford	Rick Ware Racing	15	Todd Gilliland 1	Billy Plourde 31; Jerry Kelley 5
Ford	Rick Ware Racing	15	Jenson Button 3	Billy Plourde 31; Jerry Kelley 5
Ford	Rick Ware Racing	15	Brennan Poole 7	Billy Plourde 31; Jerry Kelley 5
Ford	Rick Ware Racing	15	Gray Gaulding 1	Billy Plourde 31; Jerry Kelley 5
Ford	Rick Ware Racing	15	Andy Lally 3	Billy Plourde 31; Jerry Kelley 5
Ford	Rick Ware Racing	15	Ryan Newman 1	Billy Plourde 31; Jerry Kelley 5
Ford	Rick Ware Racing	51	Cody Ware 7	Jerry Kelley 31; Billy Plourde 5
Ford	Rick Ware Racing	51	Matt Crafton 1	Jerry Kelley 31; Billy Plourde 5
Ford	Rick Ware Racing	51	Zane Smith 1	Jerry Kelley 31; Billy Plourde 5
Ford	Rick Ware Racing	51	J. J. Yeley 8	Jerry Kelley 31; Billy Plourde 5
Ford	Rick Ware Racing	51	Ryan Newman 7	Jerry Kelley 31; Billy Plourde 5
Ford	Rick Ware Racing	51	Todd Gilliland 4	Jerry Kelley 31; Billy Plourde 5
Ford	Rick Ware Racing	51	Andy Lally 2	Jerry Kelley 31; Billy Plourde 5
Ford	Rick Ware Racing	51	Cole Custer 6	Jerry Kelley 31; Billy Plourde 5
Ford	Stewart–Haas Racing	4	Kevin Harvick	Rodney Childers 35; Stephen Doran 1
Ford	Stewart–Haas Racing	10	Aric Almirola	Drew Blickensderfer
Ford	Stewart–Haas Racing	14	Chase Briscoe	Johnny Klausmeier 14; Mike Bugarewicz 2 Richard Boswell 20
Ford	Stewart–Haas Racing	41	Ryan Preece	Chad Johnston
Ford	Team Penske	2	Austin Cindric	Jeremy Bullins 26; Brian Wilson 10
Ford	Team Penske	12	Ryan Blaney	Jonathan Hassler
Ford	Team Penske	22	Joey Logano	Paul Wolfe
Ford	Wood Brothers Racing	21	Harrison Burton	Brian Wilson 26; Jeremy Bullins 10
Toyota	23XI Racing	23	Bubba Wallace	Bootie Barker
Toyota	23XI Racing	45	Tyler Reddick	Billy Scott 35; Dave Rogers 1
Toyota	Joe Gibbs Racing	11	Denny Hamlin	Chris Gabehart
Toyota	Joe Gibbs Racing	19	Martin Truex Jr.	James Small
Toyota	Joe Gibbs Racing	20	Christopher Bell	Adam Stevens
Toyota	Joe Gibbs Racing	54	Ty Gibbs (R)	Chris Gayle

=== Non-chartered teams ===
==== Limited schedule ====
Manufacturer	Team	No.	Driver	Crew chief	Races
Chevrolet	Beard Motorsports	62	Austin Hill	Darren Shaw	6
Chevrolet	Kaulig Racing	13	Chandler Smith	Eddie Pardue	4
Chevrolet	Kaulig Racing	13	Jonathan Davenport	Eddie Pardue	1
Chevrolet	Legacy Motor Club	84	Jimmie Johnson	Todd Gordon	3
Chevrolet	Richard Childress Racing	33	Brodie Kostecki	Justin Alexander	1
Chevrolet	The Money Team Racing	50	Conor Daly	Tony Eury Jr.	2
Chevrolet	Trackhouse Racing	91	Kimi Räikkönen	Darian Grubb	1
Chevrolet	Trackhouse Racing	91	Shane van Gisbergen	Darian Grubb	2
Ford	Front Row Motorsports	36	Zane Smith	Chris Lawson	1
Ford	Front Row Motorsports	36	Todd Gilliland	Chris Lawson	1
Ford	Front Row Motorsports	36	Riley Herbst	Tony Manzer	2
Toyota	23XI Racing	67	Travis Pastrana	Eric Phillips	1
Toyota	23XI Racing	67	Kamui Kobayashi	Eric Phillips	1

== Rule changes ==
- NASCAR debuted a "wet weather" package for short tracks in 2023 in response to rain delays. The package will consist of a windshield wiper, flaps behind the wheels, taillights, and rain tires. This was made official on January 31, 2023, when NASCAR announced that the Los Angeles Memorial Coliseum, Martinsville Speedway, New Hampshire Motor Speedway, North Wilkesboro Speedway, Richmond Raceway, the Chicago Street Course, and Phoenix Raceway would have wet weather packages.
- Due to safety concerns from the 2022 season with drivers suffering concussions and feeling sore due to rear-end crashes, NASCAR made changes to the Next Gen's rear structure for 2023 to create a bigger crumple zone in the hopes that it will prevent the energy from those impacts from affecting the driver. The adjustment also includes slight changes to the center section of the car. Changes to the front structure were also slated to be made for the 2nd race at Atlanta Motor Speedway to further decrease the risk of injury.
- NASCAR formally banned drivers from wall-riding (after Ross Chastain's "Hail Melon" stunt at the 2022 Xfinity 500). NASCAR cited previously existing rules that will now be enforced in a manner to ban the move.
- Loose wheel penalties have been reduced to a two-lap penalty and two-race suspension to crew members (instead of four-race crew chief suspension).
- The requirement that drivers must be in the top 30 of the standings to be eligible for the playoffs has been removed.
- Stage break cautions have been eliminated at all road course races. Stage points will still be awarded to drivers on predetermined laps, but no caution will be displayed. This was done in an effort to reduce the time spent under cautions at lengthy tracks and to increase strategy during the race. On September 12, 2023, NASCAR officials announced that the playoff race at the Charlotte ROVAL will not have this rule and that there will be cautions at the stage ends. This was done due to there only being one caution in the previous two road course events at Indianapolis and Watkins Glen. Additionally, Elton Sawyer, NASCAR's senior vice president of competition, "noted the desire to officiate all 10 Playoffs races consistently – with each race having stage-break cautions."
- The choose cone rule, introduced in 2020, was extended to plate/superspeedway races for 2023, as well to dirt races. On March 9, 2023, NASCAR announced that all road courses would have the choose cone rule for 2023, meaning that every race will have this rule.

== Schedule ==
The 2023 schedule was released on September 14, 2022. The 2023 Daytona 500 was held on Sunday, February 19. The season finale was held at Phoenix Raceway during the first weekend of November. The Busch Light Clash returned to the Los Angeles Memorial Coliseum for the second year in a row and the race was held on February 5, which again was one week before the Super Bowl and two weeks before the Daytona 500. This was the final season for Auto Club Speedway in its 2 mile configuration, as the track has since been dropped from the schedule to be reconfigured as a short track.

No	Race name	Track	Location	Date	Time (ET)	TV	Radio
Regular Season
	Busch Light Clash	O Los Angeles Memorial Coliseum	Los Angeles, California	February 5	8pm	FOX	MRN
	Bluegreen Vacations Duel	O Daytona International Speedway	Daytona Beach, Florida	February 16	7pm	FS1	MRN
1	**Daytona 500**	O Daytona International Speedway	Daytona Beach, Florida	February 19	2:30pm	FOX	MRN
2	Pala Casino 400	O Auto Club Speedway	Fontana, California	February 26	3:30pm	FOX	MRN
3	Pennzoil 400	O Las Vegas Motor Speedway	Las Vegas, Nevada	March 5	3:30pm	FOX	PRN
4	United Rentals Work United 500	O Phoenix Raceway	Avondale, Arizona	March 12	3:30pm	FOX	MRN
5	Ambetter Health 400	O Atlanta Motor Speedway	Hampton, Georgia	March 19	3pm	FOX	PRN
6	EchoPark Automotive Grand Prix	R Circuit of the Americas	Austin, Texas	March 26	3:30pm	FOX	PRN
7	Toyota Owners 400	O Richmond Raceway	Richmond, Virginia	April 2	3:30pm	FS1	MRN
8	Food City Dirt Race	D Bristol Motor Speedway (Dirt Course)	Bristol, Tennessee	April 9	7pm	FOX	PRN
9	NOCO 400	O Martinsville Speedway	Ridgeway, Virginia	April 16	3pm	FS1	MRN
10	GEICO 500	O Talladega Superspeedway	Lincoln, Alabama	April 23	3pm	FOX	MRN
11	Würth 400	O Dover Motor Speedway	Dover, Delaware	May 1 (Note: The Würth 400 was postponed from Sunday, April 30 to Monday, May 1 due to rain.)	12pm	FS1	PRN
12	AdventHealth 400	O Kansas Speedway	Kansas City, Kansas	May 7	3pm	FS1	MRN
13	Goodyear 400	O Darlington Raceway	Darlington, South Carolina	May 14	3pm	FS1	MRN
	NASCAR All Star Open	O North Wilkesboro Speedway	North Wilkesboro, North Carolina	May 21	6pm	FS1	MRN
	NASCAR All-Star Race	O North Wilkesboro Speedway	North Wilkesboro, North Carolina	May 21	8pm	FS1	MRN
14	**Coca-Cola 600**	O Charlotte Motor Speedway	Concord, North Carolina	May 29 (Note: The Coca-Cola 600 was postponed from Sunday, May 28 to Monday, May 29 due to rain.)	3pm	FOX	PRN
15	Enjoy Illinois 300	O World Wide Technology Raceway	Madison, Illinois	June 4	3:30pm	FS1	MRN
16	Toyota/Save Mart 350	R Sonoma Raceway	Sonoma, California	June 11	3:30pm	FOX	PRN
17	Ally 400	O Nashville Superspeedway	Lebanon, Tennessee	June 25	7pm	NBC	PRN
18	Grant Park 220	S Chicago Street Course	Chicago, Illinois	July 2 (Note: Race shortened to 75 laps due to impending darkness.)	5:30pm	NBC	MRN
19	Quaker State 400	O Atlanta Motor Speedway	Hampton, Georgia	July 9 (Note: Race called at 186 laps due to rain.)	7pm	USA	PRN
20	Crayon 301	O New Hampshire Motor Speedway	Loudon, New Hampshire	July 17 (Note: The Crayon 301 was postponed from Sunday, July 16 to Monday, July 17 due to rain.)	12pm	USA	PRN
21	HighPoint.com 400	O Pocono Raceway	Long Pond, Pennsylvania	July 23	2:30pm	USA	MRN
22	Cook Out 400	O Richmond Raceway	Richmond, Virginia	July 30	3pm	USA	MRN
23	FireKeepers Casino 400	O Michigan International Speedway	Brooklyn, Michigan	August 6–7 (Note: Firekeepers Casino 400 was stopped at Lap 74 on Sunday, due to rain. The race was completed the following day.)	2:30pm	USA	MRN
24	Verizon 200 at the Brickyard	R Indianapolis Motor Speedway (Road Course)	Speedway, Indiana	August 13	2:30pm	NBC	IMS
25	Go Bowling at The Glen	R Watkins Glen International	Watkins Glen, New York	August 20	3pm	USA	MRN
26	Coke Zero Sugar 400	O Daytona International Speedway	Daytona Beach, Florida	August 26	7pm	NBC	MRN
NASCAR Cup Series Playoffs
Round of 16
27	**Cook Out Southern 500**	O Darlington Raceway	Darlington, South Carolina	September 3	6pm	USA	MRN
28	Hollywood Casino 400	O Kansas Speedway	Kansas City, Kansas	September 10	3pm	USA	MRN
29	Bass Pro Shops Night Race	O Bristol Motor Speedway	Bristol, Tennessee	September 16	7:30pm	USA	PRN
Round of 12
30	Autotrader EchoPark Automotive 400	O Texas Motor Speedway	Fort Worth, Texas	September 24	3:30pm	USA	PRN
31	YellaWood 500	O Talladega Superspeedway	Lincoln, Alabama	October 1	2:30pm	NBC	MRN
32	Bank of America Roval 400	R Charlotte Motor Speedway (Roval)	Concord, North Carolina	October 8	2pm	NBC	PRN
Round of 8
33	South Point 400	O Las Vegas Motor Speedway	Las Vegas, Nevada	October 15	2:30pm	NBC	PRN
34	4EVER 400	O Homestead–Miami Speedway	Homestead, Florida	October 22	2:30pm	NBC	MRN
35	Xfinity 500	O Martinsville Speedway	Ridgeway, Virginia	October 29	2pm	NBC	MRN
Championship 4
36	NASCAR Cup Series Championship Race	O Phoenix Raceway	Avondale, Arizona	November 5	3pm	NBC	MRN

=== Notes ===
Bolded races indicate a NASCAR Major, also known as a Crown Jewel race.

D Dirt track
O Oval track
R Road course
S Street course

=== Schedule changes ===
==== Chicago Street Course ====
After NASCAR used a Chicago Street Course track in the 2021 eNASCAR iRacing Pro Invitational Series, it was speculated that NASCAR would like to make it a reality and have a street race in Chicago on the Cup Series schedule in the future. On July 7, 2022, Jordan Bianchi from The Athletic reported that an official announcement of this being added to the Cup Series schedule would come on July 19. On June 17, Adam Stern from Sports Business Journal suggested that the Chicago Street Course could replace Road America on the 2023 Cup Series schedule as the street race would likely replace one of the road course races and Road America does not have a contract to have a Cup Series race in 2023. Both the addition of the Chicago street race to the schedule and the fact that it would replace the race at Road America came on July 19.

==== NASCAR All-Star Race ====
On June 24, 2022, Adam Stern also reported that Fox Sports, which has the TV rights to the All-Star Race, has been trying to convince NASCAR and Speedway Motorsports to move the NASCAR All-Star Race to a different venue each year as is the case in other sports. After the 2022 All-Star Race at Texas Motor Speedway, which was widely considered unpopular and controversial by fans and the industry, the track tweeted that they would be hosting the All-Star Race again in 2023. However, the tweet was deleted amidst negative reactions to the announcement, leading to speculation that plans could change. On September 7, it was revealed that the All-Star race will take place on the renovated North Wilkesboro Speedway. It would be the first NASCAR Cup race on the track since 1996, after its dates were replaced by races at Texas Motor Speedway and New Hampshire Motor Speedway in 1997.

==== Autotrader EchoPark Automotive 400 ====
On January 2, 2023, thespun.com reported that the Autotrader EchoPark Automotive 500 at Texas Motor Speedway will be reduced to 400 miles. The article states that it is an attempted overall effort by NASCAR to hopefully reduce race times, so that they are closer to 2.5 hours, than the normal 3.5 to 4 hours. The Ambetter Health 400 at Atlanta Motor Speedway was likewise shortened from 500 miles for similar reasons.

== Season summary ==
=== Regular season ===
==== Exhibition: Busch Light Clash at The Coliseum ====
Aric Almirola won the pole from the heat races. Ryan Blaney spun and collected Chase Elliott, Ty Gibbs, and Daniel Suárez. Blaney would spin two more times while Bubba Wallace, who led a lot of laps, spun and got into the wall. Martin Truex Jr. would hold off Austin Dillon and Kyle Busch for the win.

==== Speedweeks 2023 ====
In Daytona 500 qualifying, Alex Bowman of Hendrick Motorsports won the pole and was joined on the front row by teammate Kyle Larson. Jimmie Johnson and Travis Pastrana made the Daytona 500 on speed.

In the first Duel, Bowman started on pole. Joey Logano dominated and won the caution free Duel by holding off Christopher Bell. In the second Duel, Larson started on pole. Kyle Busch spun while leading after contact with Daniel Suárez and collected Riley Herbst, Austin Hill, and Justin Haley. Aric Almirola held off Austin Cindric to win the second Duel. Conor Daly and Zane Smith made the race while Hill and Chandler Smith failed to qualify.

==== Round 1: Daytona 500 ====
Alex Bowman started on pole. Brad Keselowski won the first stage. Tyler Reddick spun after contact with Kevin Harvick and collected Chase Elliott and Erik Jones. Ross Chastain won the second stage. Ryan Preece spun into the pack and collected Harvick, Michael McDowell, and Martin Truex Jr. Daniel Suárez spun, sending the race to overtime. Austin Dillon spun after contact with William Byron and collected Chastain, Jimmie Johnson, Zane Smith, and Harrison Burton. On the restart, Kyle Larson spun and collected Keselowski, Ryan Blaney, Bubba Wallace, and Travis Pastrana as Ricky Stenhouse Jr. won the race over Joey Logano under caution.

==== Round 2: Pala Casino 400 ====
Christopher Bell was awarded the pole after qualifying was canceled due to rain. Kyle Larson went to the garage with an electrical issue and returned several laps down. A. J. Allmendinger spun after contact with Corey LaJoie. Ross Chastain dominated, winning both stages and leading the most laps. A wreck occurred when the field stacked up on a restart, collecting Bell, Aric Almirola, Tyler Reddick, Justin Haley, Ryan Preece, Todd Gilliland, and Ryan Blaney. Kyle Busch overtook Chastain on the final round of green flag pit stops and pulled away to score his first win with Richard Childress Racing and Lucas Oil, and breaking the tie with Richard Petty for the most consecutive seasons with at least one win with 19 straight seasons.

==== Round 3: Pennzoil 400 ====
Joey Logano won the pole. William Byron dominated, winning both stages and leading the most laps. Logano got into the wall after contact with Brad Keselowski and spun through the grass. Kyle Larson was headed to the win when Aric Almirola got into the wall, sending the race to overtime. A. J. Allmendinger got into the wall after contact with Ryan Preece as Byron took the lead from Martin Truex Jr. and held off teammates Larson and Alex Bowman for the win.

==== Round 4: United Rentals Work United 500 ====
Kyle Larson won the pole. William Byron won the first stage while Larson won the second stage. Aric Almirola had a tire come off after a pit stop. Kevin Harvick, who was looking for his 10th career win at Phoenix Raceway, was leading comfortably with 10 laps to go, but a caution came out for a Harrison Burton spin on the frontstretch. On the caution pit stops, Harvick took 4 tires and fell back to 7th. On the ensuing restart, A. J. Allmendinger and Noah Gragson got together and collected Ty Gibbs, sending the race to overtime. Byron took the lead from Larson and held off Ryan Blaney for his second straight win. The Wednesday following the race, NASCAR handed L2 penalties to all 4 Hendrick Motorsports teams as well as the No. 31 Kaulig Racing team of Justin Haley for a loss of 100 points (owners only for No. 9, as Elliott was injured and Josh Berry, his replacement, is a Xfinity Series regular), 10 playoff points, and fined $100,000 for illegally modifying hood louvers prior to practice, while Denny Hamlin was fined $50,000 and docked 25 points for intentionally wrecking Ross Chastain on the final restart (Hamlin's penalty came after an admission on his Actions Detrimental podcast).

==== Round 5: Ambetter Health 400 ====
Joey Logano won the pole. Bubba Wallace got into the wall early as Logano won the first stage while Austin Cindric won the second stage. Kevin Harvick spun while leading and collected Josh Berry, Chris Buescher, Harrison Burton, William Byron, and B. J. McLeod. Aric Almirola blew a tire while leading and spun, collecting Kyle Larson. Logano made a last lap pass on Brad Keselowski to win.

==== Round 6: EchoPark Automotive Grand Prix ====
William Byron won the pole. Ty Dillon made contact with Brad Keselowski and collected Jimmie Johnson, who exited the race early. Bryon won the first stage while Tyler Reddick won the second stage. Austin Dillon got a flat tire, sending the race to overtime. On the restart, Ryan Preece got into Ryan Blaney, causing heavy damage. On the next restart, Daniel Suárez got a flat tire. On the third restart, Reddick pulled away from the field and picked up his first win with 23XI Racing and Monster Energy.

==== Round 7: Toyota Owners 400 ====
Alex Bowman won the pole after qualifying was canceled due to rain. J. J. Yeley spun after contact with Denny Hamlin as William Byron won the first stage. Hamlin would win the second stage. Byron spun after contact with Christopher Bell. Kyle Larson would hold off teammate Josh Berry for the win as Berry scored his best career Cup Series finish filling in for Chase Elliott.

==== Round 8: Food City Dirt Race ====
Kyle Larson won the pole from the heat races. Joey Logano got in the wall after contact with William Byron, collecting Todd Gilliland and Bubba Wallace. Larson won the first stage while Tyler Reddick won the second stage. Ryan Preece got loose and got into Larson, putting them into the wall. On a restart, Ryan Blaney spun but continued on. Christopher Bell held off Reddick as a caution came out on the final lap for the win.

==== Round 9: NOCO 400 ====
Ryan Preece won the pole. Preece dominated and won the caution free first stage, but after leading the next few laps on the restart, Precce was penalized for speeding. Kevin Harvick won the second stage after a spin by Harrison Burton. Chase Briscoe took the lead and led a lot of laps. Joey Logano had the lead late, but Kyle Larson took the lead from Logano and pulled away to his second win of the season.

==== Round 10: GEICO 500 ====
Denny Hamlin won the pole. Chase Elliott won the first stage while Aric Almirola won the second stage. Harrison Burton spun from the lead after contact with Noah Gragson. Late in the race, several drivers were coming close on fuel. Joey Logano got into the wall after contact with Daniel Suárez and collected Corey LaJoie and Ricky Stenhouse Jr., sending the race to overtime. On the restart, Gragson got into the wall after contact with Ross Chastain and collected Almirola, Kevin Harvick, Ty Gibbs, Kyle Larson, and Ryan Preece. On the final lap, Bubba Wallace spun from the lead trying to block a run by Ryan Blaney and brought out the caution. Kyle Busch had the lead at the moment of caution and had enough fuel to make it back to the flags for his second win of the season and his first at Talladega since 2008.

==== Round 11: Würth 400 ====
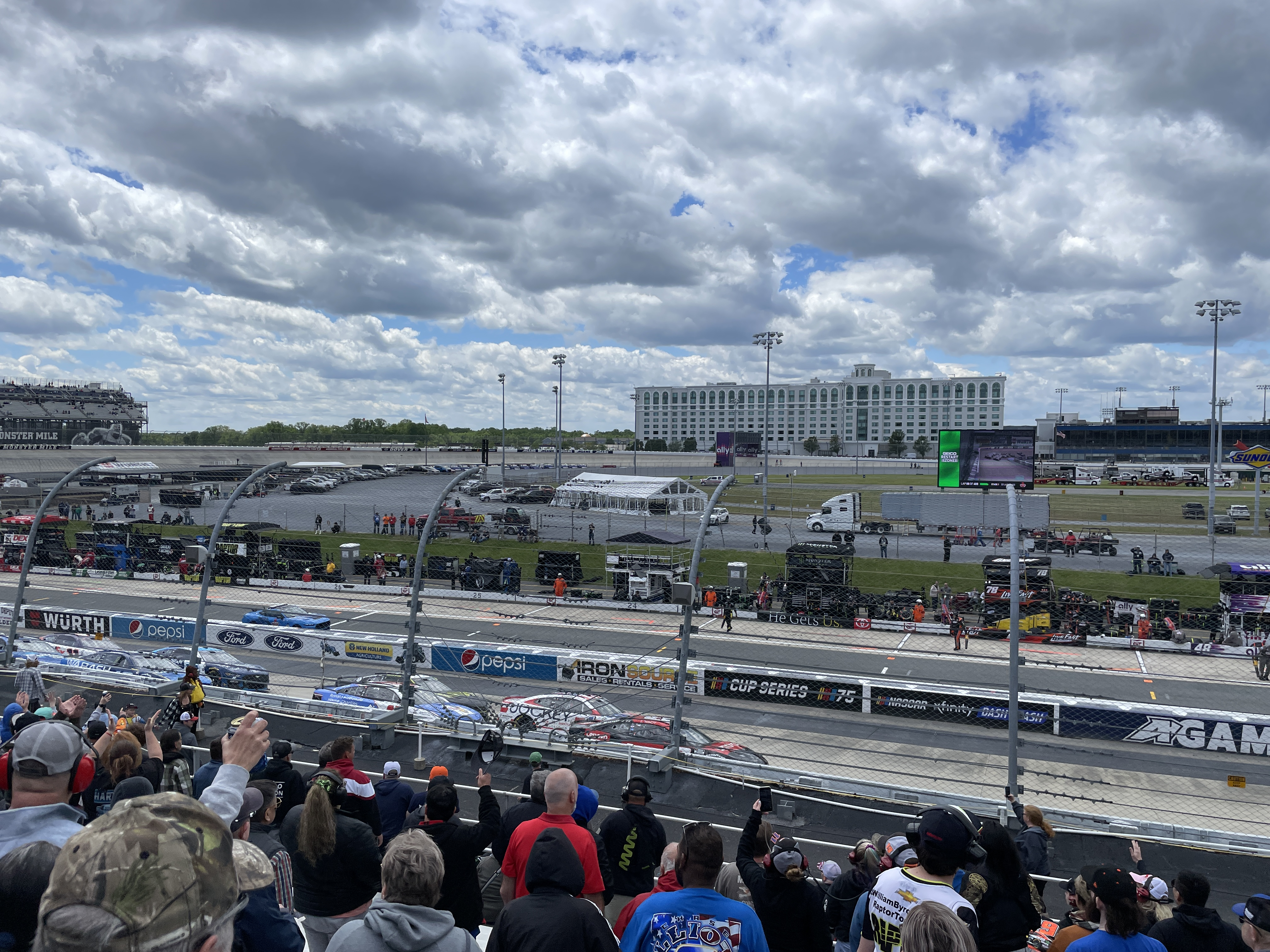
The Würth 400 at Dover Motor Speedway in May

Kyle Busch won the pole after qualifying was canceled due to rain. The race was postponed from Sunday to Monday due to rain. Brennan Poole got into the wall after contact with Ross Chastain and collected Kyle Larson. William Byron won the first stage while Chastain won the second stage. Joey Logano lost a tire and got into the wall. On the restart, Martin Truex Jr. held off Chastain for his third Dover win on a Monday to snap a 54-race winless streak and complete a brother sweep as his brother Ryan Truex won his first Xfinity Series race two days prior.

==== Round 12: AdventHealth 400 ====
William Byron won the pole. Kyle Larson spun from the lead early after contact with Tyler Reddick. Byron would get into the wall and fall back in the field. Denny Hamlin won the first stage while Joey Logano won the second stage. Kyle Busch spun and got into the wall after a flat tire. Late in the race, Noah Gragson got into the wall after contact with Ross Chastain. Larson and Hamlin battled for the lead and on the final lap, Larson got into the wall and Hamlin made the pass for the win, tying Tony Stewart on NASCAR's All-Time Wins List and earning the 400th NASCAR win for Joe Gibbs Racing.

==== Round 13: Goodyear 400 ====
Martin Truex Jr. won the pole. Truex won the first stage, but spun after contact with Ross Chastain, who won the second stage. Late in the race, Erik Jones lost a tire and spun collecting Michael McDowell, Daniel Suárez, Austin Dillon, and Ryan Newman. Truex got turned into the wall by Joey Logano and collected Aric Almirola and Tyler Reddick. On the restart, Chastain and Kyle Larson got into the wall while battling for the lead, sending the race to overtime. On the restart, William Byron held off Kevin Harvick for his third win of the season and the 100th Cup Series victory for the #24.

==== Exhibition: NASCAR All-Star Race ====
In The Open, Ty Gibbs started on pole. Noah Gragson got into the wall and collected Todd Gilliland, Chandler Smith, and Ryan Newman. Josh Berry held off Gibbs to win the Open and advanced to the All-Star Race with Gibbs and Gragson, who won the fan vote.

In the All-Star Race, Daniel Suárez started on pole. Ricky Stenhouse Jr. spun after contact with Erik Jones. Kyle Larson dominated and held off Bubba Wallace to win the $1 million for his third All-Star Race win, his third in five years.

==== Round 14: Coca-Cola 600 ====
William Byron won the pole after qualifying was canceled due to rain. The race was postponed from Sunday to Monday due to rain. Jimmie Johnson spun twice early as Byron won the first stage. After a small delay due to rain, the race resumed. Denny Hamlin got turned into the wall by Chase Elliott, taking both out of the race. Chris Buescher won the second stage while Ryan Blaney won the third stage. Kevin Harvick spun after contact with Tyler Reddick. Kyle Larson spun and collected Joey Logano and Ty Gibbs. On the restart, Blaney pulled away and held off Byron for the win.

==== Round 15: Enjoy Illinois 300 ====
Kyle Busch won the pole. The race was red flagged due to lightning. When the race resumed, Busch won the first stage while Ryan Blaney won the second stage. Several drivers had brake rotor issues including Carson Hocevar, Tyler Reddick, and Noah Gragson. Austin Dillon got into Ricky Stenhouse Jr. after contact with Austin Cindric. Bubba Wallace got into the wall, sending the race to overtime. Busch held off Denny Hamlin for his third win of the season This was Kyle Busch’s 63rd and last win in Cup before his death in 2026.

==== Round 16: Toyota/Save Mart 350 ====
Denny Hamlin won the pole. Hamlin won the first stage while Kyle Busch won the second stage. Hamlin spun and got into the wall after breaking the toe link. Tyler Reddick spun after a flat tire. Martin Truex Jr. dominated, passing Chase Elliott for the lead and holding off Busch for his second win of the season and fourth at Sonoma.

==== Round 17: Ally 400 ====
Ross Chastain won the pole. Tyler Reddick won the first stage. During Stage 2, Reddick spun coming down pit road due to a right rear wheel separation, resulting in a penalty. On the restart, Ryan Blaney spun and hit the bare concrete wall near the infield. Denny Hamlin won the second stage. Chastain would get the lead back in the final stage and held off Martin Truex Jr. for the win.

==== Round 18: Grant Park 220 ====
Denny Hamlin won the pole. Erik Jones locked up on Lap 1 and hit Brad Keselowski, sending him into Noah Gragson, with all three hitting the tire barrier. Kyle Busch sled and hit the tire barrier, causing a caution. Alex Bowman exited the race early with a blown engine. Christopher Bell won both stages. Bell sled into the tire barrier and caused several cars to clog the track. Austin Dillon would get into the wall while he and Justin Haley were fighting for the lead. Martin Truex Jr. spun into the tire barrier. On the restart, New Zealand-born V8 Supercars driver Shane van Gisbergen took the lead from Haley. Ricky Stenhouse Jr. got into the tire barrier after contact with Bubba Wallace, sending the race to overtime. On the restart, van Gisbergen held off Haley to win the race for Trackhouse Racing, earning his first Cup Series victory in his NASCAR debut, and becoming the first driver to win in their first career start since Johnny Rutherford in 1963.

==== Round 19: Quaker State 400 ====
Aric Almirola won the pole. Ryan Blaney won the first stage while Brad Keselowski won the second stage. Kyle Larson spun after contact with Erik Jones. Alex Bowman got loose and spun into Denny Hamlin. Ryan Preece spun out and collected Bubba Wallace. William Byron, despite spinning out on Lap 80 and being dealt a pit road penalty, was in the race lead. The race went seven laps under caution before NASCAR officials waved the Red flag at Lap 185 and ordered all cars to pit road as rain began to hit the track and lightning was spotted several miles from the track. With heavy rain showers and lightning, NASCAR officials declared the race official after 185 laps with Byron named the winner.

==== Round 20: Crayon 301 ====
Christopher Bell won the pole. Kyle Busch slammed into the wall along with Corey LaJoie. Aric Almirola hit the wall hard due to a loose wheel while leading the race. Martin Truex Jr. dominated, leading 154 laps and winning both stages. Bell slammed into the wall late. On the restart, Truex would hold off Joey Logano for his third win of the season.

==== Round 21: HighPoint.com 400 ====
William Byron won the pole. Joey Logano won stage one, but crashed out on a restart with Daniel Suárez. Kyle Larson would stretch his fuel and win the second stage. Austin Dillon crashed hard into the wall after contact with Tyler Reddick in the final stage, resulting in Dillon throwing his helmet at Reddick's car while the race was under caution. Various pit strategies would occur during the final stage with Larson cycling to the lead on a two tire gamble. On a late race restart, Denny Hamlin would force Larson into the wall for the lead. Hamlin would pull away on the final restart as Ryan Preece spun and was unable to get his car re-fired on the final lap. Hamlin won under caution for his second win of the season, his 50th career win, and earned his record seventh Pocono win, breaking a tie with Jeff Gordon.

==== Round 22: Cook Out 400 ====
Tyler Reddick won the pole. Reddick led every lap in a caution-free stage 1 and won the stage. Brad Keselowski won a caution-free stage 2. At the start of the final stage, Keselowski stayed out front. During a pit stop on lap 285, Keselowski almost missed his stall and ended up partially sideways, resulting in a lengthy pit stop and never retook the lead. After differing tire strategies throughout the final stage, Chris Buescher cycled to the lead on lap 305. Daniel Suárez spun after contact with Noah Gragson. After pit stops and the restart with 3 laps to go, Buescher retained the lead and pulled away from Denny Hamlin for his third career win and locked himself into the playoffs.

==== Round 23: FireKeepers Casino 400 ====
Christopher Bell won the pole. Kyle Busch and Chase Elliott both exited the race early due to damage from tire issues. Martin Truex Jr. won the first stage as William Byron got into the wall after a flat tire. Bell would get back to the lead, but got into the wall battling Alex Bowman for the spot. The race was red flagged due to rain and the remainder of the race was postponed until the following day. When the race resumed, Truex passed Daniel Suárez for the lead and won the second stage. Front Row teammates Michael McDowell and Todd Gilliland got together and collected Bowman. Chris Buescher would take the lead after the final round of green flag pit stops and held off a charging Truex for the second straight win.

==== Round 24: Verizon 200 at the Brickyard ====
Daniel Suárez won the pole. The race featured international drivers like Shane van Gisbergen, Brodie Kostecki, Mike Rockenfeller, Jenson Button, and Kamui Kobayashi. Justin Haley got into the tire barrier after contact with Joey Logano. Michael McDowell won the first stage while Denny Hamlin won the second stage. McDowell was able to hold off Chase Elliott to score the win for his second career victory.

==== Round 25: Go Bowling at The Glen ====
Denny Hamlin won the pole. Michael McDowell would win the first stage while William Byron won the second stage. McDowell exited the race due to an electrical issue. Chase Elliott ran out of fuel during the race and stalled on the track, causing the only caution of the day. Byron outdueled Kyle Busch and then pulled away to his fifth win of the season and his first career win on a road course.

==== Round 26: Coke Zero Sugar 400 ====
Chase Briscoe won the pole. Martin Truex Jr. would win the first stage and clinch the regular-season championship. On the final lap of stage 2, Ty Gibbs would spin from the lead after a shove from Christopher Bell on turn 4 and cause "The Big One" involving multiple cars including Austin Dillon, Ryan Blaney, Austin Cindric, Riley Herbst, and Ricky Stenhouse Jr. as Brad Keselowski won the second stage. Kevin Harvick was leading when his teammate Ryan Preece spun after contact with Erik Jones and went airborne and flipped in the infield grass a dozen times before coming to rest on its wheels with 5 laps to go, also collecting Briscoe. In overtime, Chris Buescher and Brad Keselowski drove past Harvick and got a 1–2 finish for the team and Buescher's third win in five races. Bubba Wallace got the final playoff spot, beating out favorites Chase Elliott and Alex Bowman.

=== Playoffs ===
==== Round 27: Cook Out Southern 500 ====
Christopher Bell won the pole. Denny Hamlin swept the stages and led the most laps. The race came to a halt as the lights inside the track in Turns 3 and 4 did not illuminate when the sun set. Hamlin later pitted because of a loose wheel and would never return to the front. Kevin Harvick, who was second at the time, went to pit during green flag stops. Tyler Reddick, who was the leader at the time, tried to do the same at the last second, resulting in him checking up, hitting Ryan Newman and causing him to spin. The caution came and closed pit road before Harvick crossed the pit entry line. Harvick was penalized as he took a full pit-stop, which placed him at the end of the lead lap. Kyle Larson was able to pass Reddick for the lead during pit stops. Alex Bowman and Daniel Suárez got together and collected Harrison Burton. Larson held the lead on the restart and won the race, advancing to the next round of the playoffs.

==== Round 28: Hollywood Casino 400 ====
Christopher Bell won his second straight pole. Martin Truex Jr. suffered a broken suspension and got into the wall on Lap 4, exiting the race and hurting his points. Kyle Larson won the first stage while Brad Keselowski won the second stage. Chris Buescher got into the wall after a flat tire, sending the race to overtime. Daniel Suárez stayed off pit road while the leaders pit and Erik Jones, Kyle Busch, and Joey Logano took two while everyone else took four. On the restart, Tyler Reddick made a three-wide pass on Logano and Jones and won the race to advance to the next round of the playoffs.

==== Round 29: Bass Pro Shops Night Race ====
Christopher Bell won his third straight pole. Bell dominated and won both stages. Denny Hamlin and Ty Gibbs both also had dominant cars. In the final stage, Corey LaJoie spun and slammed into Joey Logano, knocking Logano out of the race and ended his hopes of a second straight title. Martin Truex Jr. got into the wall after a flat tire. Hamlin would pull away from the field and score the win, advancing to the next round of the playoffs while Kevin Harvick, Logano, Michael McDowell, and Ricky Stenhouse Jr. were eliminated.

==== Round 30: Autotrader EchoPark Automotive 400 ====
Bubba Wallace won the pole. RCR teammates Austin Dillon and Kyle Busch both got into the wall after tire issues, taking them both out of the race. Tyler Reddick won the first stage while Kyle Larson won the second stage. Wallace continued his dominance and late in the race was battling Larson for the lead when Larson got loose and spun hard into the wall. Bubba pulled away on the restart, but Reddick and Erik Jones got in the wall and collected Ryan Blaney, Austin Cindric, and A. J. Allmendinger. On the restart, William Byron made a three-wide pass on Wallace and Chase Briscoe and pulled away and held off Ross Chastain to advance to the next round of the playoffs and earning the 300th Cup Series victory for Hendrick Motorsports.

==== Round 31: YellaWood 500 ====
Aric Almirola won the pole. Ricky Stenhouse Jr. ran out of fuel at the end of the first stage and slowed up causing Ross Chastain to get into the wall with Kyle Busch and Christopher Bell as Ryan Blaney won the stage. Brad Keselowski won the second stage, but would later make contact with Carson Hocevar and start a big wreck collecting Austin Dillon, Chris Buescher, Harrison Burton, Ty Gibbs, and others which brought out the red flag. On the last lap, the field wrecked involving Chase Elliott, Riley Herbst, Chase Briscoe, and Austin Cindric as Blaney beat Kevin Harvick to the line to win the race and advance to the next round of the playoffs. Harvick would later be disqualified after failing post-race inspection and was credited with last place.

==== Round 32: Bank of America Roval 400 ====
Tyler Reddick won the pole. Reddick won the first stage while Chase Elliott won the second stage. However, Elliot just missed his planned stop when a caution came out just as he was approaching pit road, resulting in him being shuffled to the back of the pack due to pitting under caution. Denny Hamlin got stacked up, spun, and made contact with Mike Rockenfeller, taking him out of the race. Erik Jones spun after contact with Ricky Stenhouse Jr., and Michael McDowell, who had power steering issues, slammed into the back of Jones. A. J. Allmendinger took the lead from Kyle Busch halfway through the race and held off William Byron for his third career win. Ross Chastain, Brad Keselowski, Busch, and Bubba Wallace were eliminated from the playoffs.

==== Round 33: South Point 400 ====
Christopher Bell won the pole, his fourth in the playoffs. Kyle Larson dominated, winning both stages. Legacy Motor Club drivers Erik Jones and Carson Hocevar both had flat tires along with Chase Briscoe, resulting in the latter two spinning. Alex Bowman slammed the wall and exited the race after losing power steering. Larson, despite minor damage after getting loose into the wall during Stage 2, held off a charging Bell to win and advance to the Championship 4 in Phoenix. Ryan Blaney, who had finished sixth, was originally disqualified after post-race inspection found his car's left front shock didn't meet the overall specified length, but NASCAR rescinded the disqualification after the damper template used for post-race inspection was discovered to have an issue.

==== Round 34: 4EVER 400 ====
Martin Truex Jr. won the pole. Kyle Larson won the first stage while Ryan Blaney won the second stage. During green flag pit stops, Larson slammed into the sand barrels at the entrance of pit road, causing him to exit the race. Denny Hamlin got a flat tire and slammed the wall and Truex suffered a blown engine, taking them both out. Their teammate Christopher Bell took the lead from William Byron and held off Blaney to win the race and advance to the Championship 4 in Phoenix.

==== Round 35: Xfinity 500 ====
Martin Truex Jr. won the pole for the second straight race. Alex Bowman spun after contact with Austin Dillon. Denny Hamlin and Ryan Blaney dominated the race, leading the majority of the laps and splitting the stage wins. Ty Gibbs spun after contact with Joey Logano. Several cars stayed out while Hamlin and Blaney were trapped in traffic. Chase Elliott and Aric Almirola led most of the final 170 laps, but Blaney passed both and held off Almirola to win the race and advance to the Championship 4 in Phoenix joining Kyle Larson and Christopher Bell along with William Byron while Hamlin, Truex, Tyler Reddick, and Chris Buescher were eliminated from the playoffs.

==== Round 36: NASCAR Cup Series Championship Race ====
William Byron won the pole. Byron won the first stage after leading every lap. On lap 109, Christopher Bell got into the wall hard due to a brake rotor failure, taking him out of championship contention early. Chris Buescher won stage 2. On lap 276, Kyle Busch spun, creating a late restart. On lap 292, Ryan Blaney passed Kyle Larson for second place, putting him in the championship lead. Ross Chastain won the race after leading 157 laps. Blaney became the 2023 NASCAR Cup Series Champion after his second-place finish. Kevin Harvick finished 7th in his final race.

== Results and standings ==
=== Race results ===
No.	Race	Pole position	Most laps led	Winning driver	Manufacturer	Report
	Busch Light Clash at The Coliseum	Aric Almirola	Ryan Preece	Martin Truex Jr.	Toyota	Report
	Bluegreen Vacations Duel 1	Alex Bowman	Ryan Blaney	Joey Logano	Ford	Report
	Bluegreen Vacations Duel 2	Kyle Larson	Kyle Busch	Aric Almirola	Ford	Report
1	Daytona 500	Alex Bowman	Brad Keselowski	Ricky Stenhouse Jr.	Chevrolet	Report
2	Pala Casino 400	Christopher Bell	Ross Chastain	Kyle Busch	Chevrolet	Report
3	Pennzoil 400	Joey Logano	William Byron	William Byron	Chevrolet	Report
4	United Rentals Work United 500	Kyle Larson	Kyle Larson	William Byron	Chevrolet	Report
5	Ambetter Health 400	Joey Logano	Joey Logano	Joey Logano	Ford	Report
6	EchoPark Automotive Grand Prix	William Byron	Tyler Reddick	Tyler Reddick	Toyota	Report
7	Toyota Owners 400	Alex Bowman	William Byron	Kyle Larson	Chevrolet	Report
8	Food City Dirt Race	Kyle Larson	Christopher Bell	Christopher Bell	Toyota	Report
9	NOCO 400	Ryan Preece	Ryan Preece	Kyle Larson	Chevrolet	Report
10	GEICO 500	Denny Hamlin	Ryan Blaney	Kyle Busch	Chevrolet	Report
11	Würth 400	Kyle Busch	William Byron	Martin Truex Jr.	Toyota	Report
12	AdventHealth 400	William Byron	Kyle Larson	Denny Hamlin	Toyota	Report
13	Goodyear 400	Martin Truex Jr.	Martin Truex Jr.	William Byron	Chevrolet	Report
	NASCAR All-Star Open	Ty Gibbs	Ty Gibbs	Josh Berry	Chevrolet	Report
	NASCAR All-Star Race	Daniel Suárez	Kyle Larson	Kyle Larson	Chevrolet	Report
14	Coca-Cola 600	William Byron	Ryan Blaney	Ryan Blaney	Ford	Report
15	Enjoy Illinois 300	Kyle Busch	Kyle Busch	Kyle Busch	Chevrolet	Report
16	Toyota/Save Mart 350	Denny Hamlin	Martin Truex Jr.	Martin Truex Jr.	Toyota	Report
17	Ally 400	Ross Chastain	Ross Chastain	Ross Chastain	Chevrolet	Report
18	Grant Park 220	Denny Hamlin	Christopher Bell	Shane van Gisbergen	Chevrolet	Report
19	Quaker State 400	Aric Almirola	Aric Almirola	William Byron	Chevrolet	Report
20	Crayon 301	Christopher Bell	Martin Truex Jr.	Martin Truex Jr.	Toyota	Report
21	HighPoint.com 400	William Byron	William Byron	Denny Hamlin	Toyota	Report
22	Cook Out 400	Tyler Reddick	Brad Keselowski	Chris Buescher	Ford	Report
23	FireKeepers Casino 400	Christopher Bell	Chris Buescher	Chris Buescher	Ford	Report
24	Verizon 200 at the Brickyard	Daniel Suárez	Michael McDowell	Michael McDowell	Ford	Report
25	Go Bowling at The Glen	Denny Hamlin	William Byron	William Byron	Chevrolet	Report
26	Coke Zero Sugar 400	Chase Briscoe	Chase Briscoe	Chris Buescher	Ford	Report
NASCAR Cup Series Playoffs
Round of 16
27	Cook Out Southern 500	Christopher Bell	Denny Hamlin	Kyle Larson	Chevrolet	Report
28	Hollywood Casino 400	Christopher Bell	Kyle Larson	Tyler Reddick	Toyota	Report
29	Bass Pro Shops Night Race	Christopher Bell	Christopher Bell	Denny Hamlin	Toyota	Report
Round of 12
30	Autotrader EchoPark Automotive 400	Bubba Wallace	Bubba Wallace	William Byron	Chevrolet	Report
31	YellaWood 500	Aric Almirola	Joey Logano	Ryan Blaney	Ford	Report
32	Bank of America Roval 400	Tyler Reddick	A. J. Allmendinger	A. J. Allmendinger	Chevrolet	Report
Round of 8
33	South Point 400	Christopher Bell	Kyle Larson	Kyle Larson	Chevrolet	Report
34	4EVER 400	Martin Truex Jr.	Kyle Larson	Christopher Bell	Toyota	Report
35	Xfinity 500	Martin Truex Jr.	Denny Hamlin	Ryan Blaney	Ford	Report
Championship 4
36	NASCAR Cup Series Championship Race	William Byron	Ross Chastain	Ross Chastain	Chevrolet	Report

=== Drivers' championship ===
(key) Bold – Pole position awarded by time. Italics – Pole position set by competition-based formula. * – Most laps led. ^{1} – Stage 1 winner. ^{2} – Stage 2 winner. ^{3} – Stage 3 winner. (Note: Stage 3 Winner only for Coca-Cola 600 and Daytona 500 qualifying race, but no playoff point at Daytona)^{1–10} - Regular season top 10 finishers.
. – Eliminated after Round of 16 . – Eliminated after Round of 12 . – Eliminated after Round of 8

Pos.	Driver	DAY	CAL	LVS	PHO	ATL	COA	RCH	BRD	MAR	TAL	DOV	KAN	DAR	CLT	GTW	SON	NSS	CSC	ATL	NHA	POC	RCH	MCH	IRC	GLN	DAY	DAR	KAN	BRI	TEX	TAL	ROV	LVS	HOM	MAR	PHO	Pts.	Stage	Bonus
1	Ryan Blaney	8	26	13	2	7	21	26	23	7	2*	3	16	9	1*^{3}	6^{2}	31	36	33	9^{1}	22	30	14	9	13	9	36	9	12	22	28	1^{1}	12	6	2^{2}	1^{2}	2	5035	–	14
2	Kyle Larson	18	29	2	**4***^{2}	31	14	1	**35**^{1}	1	33	32	2*	20	30	4	8	5	4	36	3	20^{2}	19	5	8	26	27	1	4*^{1}	2	31^{2}	15	13	1*^{12}	34*^{1}	6	3	5034	–	24^{7}
3	William Byron	34	25	1*^{12}	1^{1}	32	**5**^{1}	24*^{1}	13	23	7	4*^{1}	**3**	1	2^{1}	8	14	6	13	1	24	**14***	21	35	14	1*^{2}	8	4	15	9	1	2	2	7	4	13	**4**^{1}	5033	–	41^{3}
4	Christopher Bell	3	32	5	6	3	31	4	1*	16	8	6	36	14	24	11	9	7	18*^{12}	23	**29**	6	20	**13**	9	3	16	**23**	**8**	**3***^{12}	4	14	15	**2**	1	7	36	5001	–	16^{4}
NASCAR Cup Series Playoffs cut-off
Pos.	Driver	DAY	CAL	LVS	PHO	ATL	COA	RCH	BRD	MAR	TAL	DOV	KAN	DAR	CLT	GTW	SON	NSS	CSC	ATL	NHA	POC	RCH	MCH	IRC	GLN	DAY	DAR	KAN	BRI	TEX	TAL	ROV	LVS	HOM	MAR	PHO	Pts.	Stage	Bonus
5	Denny Hamlin	17	6	11	23	6	16	20^{2}	22	4	**17**	5	1^{1}	12	35	2	**36**^{1}	3^{2}	**11**	14	7	1	2	3	19^{2}	**2**	26	25*^{12}	2	1	5	3	37	10	30	3*^{1}	8	2383	42	32^{2}
6	Tyler Reddick	39	34	15	3	5	1*^{2}	16	2^{2}	22	16	7	9	22	5	35	33	30^{1}	28	27	6	2	**16**^{1}	30	4	8	25	2	1	15	25^{1}	16	**6**^{1}	8	3	26	22	2344	17	16
7	Chris Buescher	4	13	21	15	35	8	30	18	14	3	9	17	10	8^{2}	12	4	18	10	15	15	18	1	1*	11	7	1	3	27	4	14	19	7	11	21	8	5^{2}	2310	15	21^{6}
8	Brad Keselowski	22*^{1}	7	17	18	2	35	10	17	24	5	8	19	4	19	28	16	11	24	6^{2}	5	16	6*^{2}	4	20	15	2^{2}	6	9^{2}	8	7	32^{2}	18	4	28	33	15	2302	57	12^{5}
9	Ross Chastain	9^{2}	3*^{12}	12	24	13	4	3	28	13	23	2^{2}	5	29^{2}	22	22	10	**1***	22	35	23	13	24	7	17	18	17	5	13	23	2	37	10	5	31	14	1*	2299	42	11^{10}
10	Bubba Wallace	20	30	4	14	27	37	22	12	9	28	12	4	5	4	30	17	15	31	25	8	11	12	18	18	12	12	7	32	14	**3***	23	16	13	6	11	10	2279	27	–
11	Martin Truex Jr.	15	11	7	17	19	17	11	7	3	27	1	8	**31***^{1}	3	5	1*	2	32	29	1*^{12}	3	7	2^{12}	7	6	24^{1}	18	36	19	17	18	20	9	**29**	**12**	6	2269	35	36^{1}
12	Joey Logano	2	10	**36**	11	**1***^{1}	28	7	37	2	30	31	6^{2}	18	21	3	3	19	8	17	2	35^{1}	4	14	34	10	5	12	5	34	21	24*	5	12	8	5	18	2258	24	8
13	Kevin Harvick	12	5	9	5	33	13	5	9	20^{2}	21	19	11	2	11	10	11	24	29	30	4	4	10	8	23	21	9	19	11	29	6	38	19	16	11	16	7	2241	37	4^{8}
14	Kyle Busch	19	1	14	8	10	2	14	32	21	1	21	35	7	6	**1***^{1}	2^{2}	9	5	5	36	21	3	37	36	14	7	11	7	20	34	25	3	3	18	27	25	2232	11	19^{9}
15	Michael McDowell	28	18	25	13	21	12	6	11	19	35	22	26	33	28	9	7	28	7	4	13	19	22	24	1*^{1}	36^{1}	13	32	26	6	15	21	32	17	22	25	9	2185	15	7
16	Ricky Stenhouse Jr.	1	12	24	19	17	7	35	4	8	15	15	12	13	7	32	12	22	34	10	18	7	17	21	25	13	34	16	23	10	9	22	34	25	27	19	23	2168	1	5
17	Chase Elliott	38	2							10	12^{1}	11	7	3	34		5	4	3	13	12	10	13	36	2	32	4	8	6	7	11	7	9^{2}	32	15	17	16	820	116	2
18	Ty Gibbs **(R)**	25	16	22	28	9	9	9	10	18	31	13	34	16	26	20	18	14	9	34	27	5	15	11	12	5	35	21	14	5	33	34	4	34	7	18	21	771	95	–
19	Daniel Suárez	7	4	10	22	29	27	23	25	17	9	35	15	34	23	7	22	12	27	2	16	36	33	6	**3**	22	20	34	16	21	8	10	33	15	16	34	11	756	108	–
20	Alex Bowman	**5**	8	3	9	14	3	8	29	11	13				12	26	15	17	37	26	14	24	18	33	5	23	6	33	10	13	12	28	8	35	19	32	17	701	98	-5
21	A. J. Allmendinger	6	36	18	20	16	34	27	16	27	29	18	14	23	14	14	6	10	17	3	19	17	27	26	26	4	29	13	30	30	29	20	1*	21	5	28	32	692	61	5
22	Aric Almirola	21	35	16	33	30	30	13	31	6	22^{2}	24	13	21	25	19	28	25	12	**18***	34	12	8	16	39	30	3	14	17	18	18	**17**	21	14	9	2	13	675	36	1
23	Ryan Preece	36	33	23	12	28	32	18	24	**15***^{1}	34	17	27	15	13	17	13	16	15	24	28	31	5	22	31	17	31	28	18	12	23	8	11	26	13	20	14	637	54	1
24	Austin Cindric	23	28	6	25	11^{2}	6	28	19	33	26	26	31	19	31	13	25	27	6	12	25	23	26	12	15	16	37	31	31	32	27	5	25	23	12	9	35	626	62	1
25	Corey LaJoie	16	14	20	26	4	11	21	30	26	25	14	20	24	17	21	20	20	14	31	33	27	32	15	29	20	10	22	22	25	26	4	17	19	20	22	31	603	13	–
26	Justin Haley	32	21	8	27	22	19	29	6	28	19	23	18	8	15	16	21	23	2	8	17	33	30	23	38	24	21	24	21	35	13	6	22	22	23	30	29	593	15	–
27	Erik Jones	37	19	19	21	8	23	31	14	31	6	16	21	25	32	18	32	8	16	11	11	9	23	10	35	29	18	10	3	24	30	26	36	28	14	21	20	578	40	–5
28	Todd Gilliland	27	17	31	32	15	10	15	8	25	10	25	24	11	33	15	24	35	19	16	21	15	25	29	37	11	32	26	25	16	35	12	23	27	25	10	30	554	8	–
29	Austin Dillon	33	9	27	16	20	33	25	3	12	38	27	10	35	9	31	19	13	36	21	9	34	9	19	16	31	33	20	33	17	36	33	14	18	10	23	12	545	55	-5
30	Chase Briscoe	35	20	28	7	24	15	12	5	5	4	30	32	17	20	34	29	31	20	22	10	29	11	31	6	35	**30***	15	19	27	10	13	28	33	17	4	24	534	55	–25
31	Harrison Burton	26	15	26	35	34	22	19	15	29	36	20	30	6	18	23	27	21	30	28	20	8	31	17	21	33	28	35	35	28	20	31	24	20	36	15	26	452	6	–
32	Ty Dillon	40	31	34	30	23	39	32	21	32	14	36	22	27	27	25	23	32	35	19	26	28	34	20	27	34	11	29	28	33	19	27	31	24	24	24	28	364	14	–
33	Noah Gragson **(R)**	24	22	30	29	12	20	37	33	30	32	34	29	26	36	33		26	25	33	32	22	28															199	14	–
34	Cody Ware	14	27	35	34	25	25	34																														65	–	–
35	Jenson Button						18												21						28													45	1	–
36	Mike Rockenfeller																								24	19							29					39	–	–
37	Travis Pastrana	11																																				26	–	–
38	Brodie Kostecki																								22													15	–	–
39	Jimmie Johnson	31					38								37																							12	4	–
40	Kimi Räikkönen						29																															8	–	–
41	Jonathan Davenport								36																													1	–	–
Ineligible for driver points
Pos.	Driver	DAY	CAL	LVS	PHO	ATL	COA	RCH	BRD	MAR	TAL	DOV	KAN	DAR	CLT	GTW	SON	NSS	CSC	ATL	NHA	POC	RCH	MCH	IRC	GLN	DAY	DAR	KAN	BRI	TEX	TAL	ROV	LVS	HOM	MAR	PHO	Pts.	Stage	Bonus
	Shane van Gisbergen																		1						10															
	Josh Berry			29	10	18		2	27			10	25	30										34			22													
	J. J. Yeley		23	33		26		36	20	36	11	28	23		16	24		29		7		26	35	27			19	30	34	26	32	36		29	33	35	27			
	Riley Herbst	10									20																38					9								
	Zane Smith	13			31					34	37				10		34														24		30							
	Chandler Smith	DNQ						17																			15					11								
	Carson Hocevar															36												17	20	11	16	35		36		31	19			
	Austin Hill	DNQ									24									37				28			14						27							
	B. J. McLeod	30	24	32	36	36			26		18	29		32	29	27				20	31	32	36				23	36		31	22	29		31		36	33			
	Josh Bilicki						26						33				30	34	23					32	32	27							26		35					
	Cole Custer																			32	35	25		25		28			24								QL			
	Jordan Taylor						24																																	
	Andy Lally																35		26						30	25							35							
	Ryan Newman													28							30		29					27		36					26	29	34			
	Grant Enfinger																26																							
	Brennan Poole											33	28	36				33									39					30		30						
	Conor Daly	29					36																																	
	Gray Gaulding															29																								
	Sheldon Creed																												29											
	John Hunter Nemechek																																		32					
	Anthony Alfredo							33		35																														
	Kamui Kobayashi																								33															
	Matt Crafton								34																															
	Derek Kraus																						QL																	
Pos.	Driver	DAY	CAL	LVS	PHO	ATL	COA	RCH	BRD	MAR	TAL	DOV	KAN	DAR	CLT	GTW	SON	NSS	CSC	ATL	NHA	POC	RCH	MCH	IRC	GLN	DAY	DAR	KAN	BRI	TEX	TAL	ROV	LVS	HOM	MAR	PHO	Pts.	Stage	Bonus

Notes

=== Manufacturers' championship ===
Pos	Manufacturer	Wins	Points
1	Chevrolet	18	1328
2	Toyota	10	1248
3	Ford	8	1239

== See also ==
- 2023 NASCAR Xfinity Series
- 2023 NASCAR Craftsman Truck Series
- 2023 ARCA Menards Series
- 2023 ARCA Menards Series East
- 2023 ARCA Menards Series West
- 2023 NASCAR Whelen Modified Tour
- 2023 NASCAR Pinty's Series
- 2023 NASCAR Mexico Series
- 2023 NASCAR Whelen Euro Series
- 2023 NASCAR Brasil Sprint Race
- 2023 SRX Series
- 2023 CARS Tour
- 2023 SMART Modified Tour
