= 2023 Autotrader EchoPark Automotive 400 =

NASCAR Cup Series race

Race details
- Race 30 of 36 in the 2023 NASCAR Cup Series
- Date: September 24, 2023
- Location: Texas Motor Speedway in Fort Worth, Texas
- Course: Permanent racing facility
- Course length: 1.5 miles (2.4 km)
- Distance: 267 laps, 400.5 mi (644.541 km)
- Average speed: 123.569 miles per hour (198.865 km/h)

Pole position
Driver	Bubba Wallace	23XI Racing
- Time: 28.672

Most laps led
Driver	Bubba Wallace	23XI Racing
- Laps: 112

Winner
No. 24	William Byron	Hendrick Motorsports

Television in the United States
- Network: USA
- Announcers: Rick Allen, Jeff Burton, Steve Letarte and Dale Earnhardt Jr.

Radio in the United States
- Radio: PRN
- Booth announcers: Doug Rice and Mark Garrow
- Turn announcers: Rob Albright (1 & 2) and Pat Patterson (3 & 4)

The 2023 Autotrader EchoPark Automotive 400 was a NASCAR Cup Series race held on September 24, 2023, at Texas Motor Speedway in Fort Worth, Texas. Contested over 267 laps on the 1.5 mile (2.4 km) intermediate quad-oval, it will be the 30th race of the 2023 NASCAR Cup Series season, fourth race of the Playoffs, and first race of the Round of 12.

== Report ==
=== Background ===
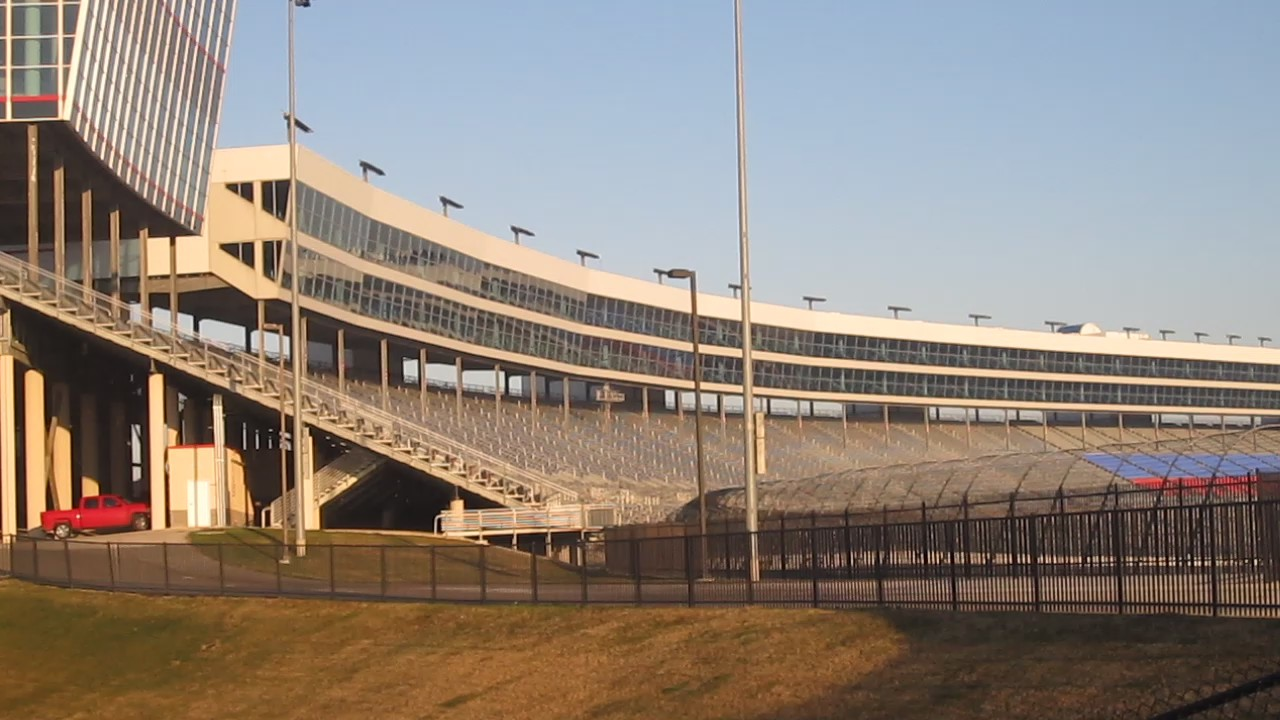
Texas Motor Speedway, the track where the race was held.

Texas Motor Speedway is a speedway located in the northernmost portion of the U.S. city of Fort Worth, Texas – the portion located in Denton County, Texas. The track measures 1.5 miles (2.4 km) around and is banked 24 degrees in the turns, and is of the oval design, where the front straightaway juts outward slightly. The track layout is similar to Atlanta Motor Speedway and Charlotte Motor Speedway (formerly Lowe's Motor Speedway). The track is owned by Speedway Motorsports, Inc., the same company that owns Atlanta and Charlotte Motor Speedway, as well as the short-track Bristol Motor Speedway.

==== Entry list ====
- (R) denotes rookie driver.
- (i) denotes driver who is ineligible for series driver points.
- (P) denotes playoff driver.
- (OP) denotes owner’s playoffs car.

No.	Driver	Team	Manufacturer
1	Ross Chastain (P)	Trackhouse Racing	Chevrolet
2	Austin Cindric	Team Penske	Ford
3	Austin Dillon	Richard Childress Racing	Chevrolet
4	Kevin Harvick	Stewart-Haas Racing	Ford
5	Kyle Larson (P)	Hendrick Motorsports	Chevrolet
6	Brad Keselowski (P)	RFK Racing	Ford
7	Corey LaJoie	Spire Motorsports	Chevrolet
8	Kyle Busch (P)	Richard Childress Racing	Chevrolet
9	Chase Elliott (OP)	Hendrick Motorsports	Chevrolet
10	Aric Almirola	Stewart-Haas Racing	Ford
11	Denny Hamlin (P)	Joe Gibbs Racing	Toyota
12	Ryan Blaney (P)	Team Penske	Ford
14	Chase Briscoe	Stewart-Haas Racing	Ford
15	J. J. Yeley (i)	Rick Ware Racing	Ford
16	A. J. Allmendinger	Kaulig Racing	Chevrolet
17	Chris Buescher (P)	RFK Racing	Ford
19	Martin Truex Jr. (P)	Joe Gibbs Racing	Toyota
20	Christopher Bell (P)	Joe Gibbs Racing	Toyota
21	Harrison Burton	Wood Brothers Racing	Ford
22	Joey Logano	Team Penske	Ford
23	Bubba Wallace (P)	23XI Racing	Toyota
24	William Byron (P)	Hendrick Motorsports	Chevrolet
31	Justin Haley	Kaulig Racing	Chevrolet
34	Michael McDowell	Front Row Motorsports	Ford
38	Zane Smith (i)	Front Row Motorsports	Ford
41	Ryan Preece	Stewart-Haas Racing	Ford
42	Carson Hocevar (i)	Legacy Motor Club	Chevrolet
43	Erik Jones	Legacy Motor Club	Chevrolet
45	Tyler Reddick (P)	23XI Racing	Toyota
47	Ricky Stenhouse Jr.	JTG Daugherty Racing	Chevrolet
48	Alex Bowman	Hendrick Motorsports	Chevrolet
51	Todd Gilliland	Rick Ware Racing	Ford
54	Ty Gibbs (R)	Joe Gibbs Racing	Toyota
77	Ty Dillon	Spire Motorsports	Chevrolet
78	B. J. McLeod (i)	Live Fast Motorsports	Chevrolet
99	Daniel Suárez	Trackhouse Racing	Chevrolet
Official entry list

== Practice ==
Michael McDowell was the fastest in the practice session with a time of 29.068 seconds and a speed of 185.771 mph (298.969 km/h).

=== Practice results ===
Pos	No.	Driver	Team	Manufacturer	Time	Speed
1	34	Michael McDowell	Front Row Motorsports	Ford	29.068	185.771
2	22	Joey Logano	Team Penske	Ford	29.069	185.765
3	8	Kyle Busch (P)	Richard Childress Racing	Chevrolet	29.096	185.593
Official practice results

== Qualifying ==
Bubba Wallace scored the pole for the race with a time 28.672 of and a speed of 188.337 mph (303.099 km/h).

=== Qualifying results ===
Pos	No.	Driver	Team	Manufacturer	R1	R2
1	23	Bubba Wallace (P)	23XI Racing	Toyota	28.567	28.672
2	17	Chris Buescher (P)	RFK Racing	Ford	28.714	28.711
3	6	Brad Keselowski (P)	RFK Racing	Ford	28.880	28.740
4	54	Ty Gibbs (R)	Joe Gibbs Racing	Toyota	28.695	28.760
5	1	Ross Chastain (P)	Trackhouse Racing	Chevrolet	28.639	28.769
6	16	A. J. Allmendinger	Kaulig Racing	Chevrolet	28.848	28.823
7	8	Kyle Busch (P)	Richard Childress Racing	Chevrolet	28.854	28.885
8	99	Daniel Suárez	Trackhouse Racing	Chevrolet	28.881	28.885
9	20	Christopher Bell (P)	Joe Gibbs Racing	Toyota	28.820	28.893
10	11	Denny Hamlin (P)	Joe Gibbs Racing	Toyota	28.585	0.000
11	5	Kyle Larson (P)	Hendrick Motorsports	Chevrolet	28.718	—
12	43	Erik Jones	Legacy Motor Club	Chevrolet	28.772	—
13	3	Austin Dillon	Richard Childress Racing	Chevrolet	28.797	—
14	48	Alex Bowman	Hendrick Motorsports	Chevrolet	28.800	—
15	45	Tyler Reddick (P)	23XI Racing	Toyota	28.832	—
16	19	Martin Truex Jr. (P)	Joe Gibbs Racing	Toyota	28.900	—
17	34	Michael McDowell	Front Row Motorsports	Ford	28.944	—
18	24	William Byron (P)	Hendrick Motorsports	Chevrolet	28.970	—
19	42	Carson Hocevar (i)	Legacy Motor Club	Chevrolet	29.006	—
20	22	Joey Logano	Team Penske	Ford	29.010	—
21	10	Aric Almirola	Stewart-Haas Racing	Ford	29.026	—
22	4	Kevin Harvick	Stewart-Haas Racing	Ford	29.091	—
23	12	Ryan Blaney (P)	Team Penske	Ford	29.097	—
24	47	Ricky Stenhouse Jr.	JTG Daugherty Racing	Chevrolet	29.110	—
25	41	Ryan Preece	Stewart-Haas Racing	Ford	29.117	—
26	77	Ty Dillon	Spire Motorsports	Chevrolet	29.156	—
27	7	Corey LaJoie	Spire Motorsports	Chevrolet	29.185	—
28	31	Justin Haley	Kaulig Racing	Chevrolet	29.187	—
29	9	Chase Elliott (OP)	Hendrick Motorsports	Chevrolet	29.220	—
30	21	Harrison Burton	Wood Brothers Racing	Ford	29.231	—
31	14	Chase Briscoe	Stewart-Haas Racing	Ford	29.232	—
32	2	Austin Cindric	Team Penske	Ford	29.277	—
33	38	Zane Smith (i)	Front Row Motorsports	Ford	29.316	—
34	78	B. J. McLeod (i)	Live Fast Motorsports	Chevrolet	29.423	—
35	15	J. J. Yeley (i)	Rick Ware Racing	Ford	29.555	—
36	51	Todd Gilliland	Rick Ware Racing	Ford	29.571	—
Official qualifying results

== Race ==
=== Race results ===
==== Stage results ====
Stage One Laps: 80

Pos	No	Driver	Team	Manufacturer	Points
1	45	Tyler Reddick (P)	23XI Racing	Toyota	10
2	17	Chris Buescher (P)	RFK Racing	Ford	9
3	20	Christopher Bell (P)	Joe Gibbs Racing	Toyota	8
4	24	William Byron (P)	Hendrick Motorsports	Chevrolet	7
5	34	Michael McDowell	Front Row Motorsports	Ford	6
6	9	Chase Elliott (OP)	Hendrick Motorsports	Chevrolet	5
7	12	Ryan Blaney (P)	Team Penske	Ford	4
8	14	Chase Briscoe	Stewart-Haas Racing	Ford	3
9	11	Denny Hamlin (P)	Joe Gibbs Racing	Toyota	2
10	23	Bubba Wallace (P)	23XI Racing	Toyota	1
Official stage one results

Stage Two Laps: 85

Pos	No	Driver	Team	Manufacturer	Points
1	5	Kyle Larson (P)	Hendrick Motorsports	Chevrolet	10
2	43	Erik Jones	Legacy Motor Club	Chevrolet	9
3	11	Denny Hamlin (P)	Joe Gibbs Racing	Toyota	8
4	12	Ryan Blaney (P)	Team Penske	Ford	7
5	17	Chris Buescher (P)	RFK Racing	Ford	6
6	9	Chase Elliott (OP)	Hendrick Motorsports	Chevrolet	5
7	6	Brad Keselowski (P)	RFK Racing	Ford	4
8	1	Ross Chastain (P)	Trackhouse Racing	Chevrolet	3
9	23	Bubba Wallace (P)	23XI Racing	Toyota	2
10	99	Daniel Suárez	Trackhouse Racing	Chevrolet	1
Official stage two results

=== Final Stage results ===
Stage Three Laps: 102

Pos	Grid	No	Driver	Team	Manufacturer	Laps	Points
1	18	24	William Byron (P)	Hendrick Motorsports	Chevrolet	267	47
2	5	1	Ross Chastain (P)	Trackhouse Racing	Chevrolet	267	38
3	1	23	Bubba Wallace (P)	23XI Racing	Toyota	267	37
4	9	20	Christopher Bell (P)	Joe Gibbs Racing	Toyota	267	41
5	10	11	Denny Hamlin (P)	Joe Gibbs Racing	Toyota	267	42
6	22	4	Kevin Harvick	Stewart-Haas Racing	Ford	267	31
7	3	6	Brad Keselowski (P)	RFK Racing	Ford	267	34
8	8	99	Daniel Suárez	Trackhouse Racing	Chevrolet	267	30
9	24	47	Ricky Stenhouse Jr.	JTG Daugherty Racing	Chevrolet	267	28
10	31	14	Chase Briscoe	Stewart-Haas Racing	Ford	267	30
11	29	9	Chase Elliott (OP)	Hendrick Motorsports	Chevrolet	267	36
12	14	48	Alex Bowman	Hendrick Motorsports	Chevrolet	267	25
13	28	31	Justin Haley	Kaulig Racing	Chevrolet	267	24
14	2	17	Chris Buescher (P)	RFK Racing	Ford	267	38
15	17	34	Michael McDowell	Front Row Motorsports	Ford	267	28
16	19	42	Carson Hocevar (i)	Legacy Motor Club	Chevrolet	267	0
17	16	19	Martin Truex Jr. (P)	Joe Gibbs Racing	Toyota	267	20
18	21	10	Aric Almirola	Stewart-Haas Racing	Ford	267	19
19	26	77	Ty Dillon	Spire Motorsports	Chevrolet	267	18
20	30	21	Harrison Burton	Wood Brothers Racing	Ford	267	17
21	20	22	Joey Logano	Team Penske	Ford	267	16
22	34	78	B. J. McLeod (i)	Live Fast Motorsports	Chevrolet	267	0
23	25	41	Ryan Preece	Stewart-Haas Racing	Ford	267	14
24	33	38	Zane Smith (i)	Front Row Motorsports	Ford	267	0
25	15	45	Tyler Reddick (P)	23XI Racing	Toyota	267	22
26	27	7	Corey LaJoie	Spire Motorsports	Chevrolet	262	11
27	32	2	Austin Cindric	Team Penske	Ford	261	10
28	23	12	Ryan Blaney (P)	Team Penske	Ford	258	20
29	6	16	A. J. Allmendinger	Kaulig Racing	Chevrolet	255	8
30	12	43	Erik Jones	Legacy Motor Club	Chevrolet	255	16
31	11	5	Kyle Larson (P)	Hendrick Motorsports	Chevrolet	248	16
32	35	15	J. J. Yeley (i)	Rick Ware Racing	Ford	241	0
33	4	54	Ty Gibbs (R)	Joe Gibbs Racing	Toyota	77	4
34	7	8	Kyle Busch (P)	Richard Childress Racing	Chevrolet	72	3
35	36	51	Todd Gilliland	Rick Ware Racing	Ford	52	2
36	13	3	Austin Dillon	Richard Childress Racing	Chevrolet	40	1
Official race results

=== Race statistics ===
- Lead changes: 22 among 13 different drivers
- Cautions/Laps: 11 for 55 laps
- Red flags: 0
- Time of race: 3 hours, 14 minutes, and 28 seconds
- Average speed: 123.569 miles per hour (198.865 km/h)

== Media ==
=== Television ===
USA covered the race on the television side. Rick Allen, Two–time Texas winner Jeff Burton, Steve Letarte and 2000 Texas winner Dale Earnhardt Jr. called the race from the broadcast booth. Dave Burns, Kim Coon and Marty Snider handled the pit road duties from pit lane.

USA
Booth announcers	Pit reporters
Lap-by-lap: Rick Allen; Color-commentator: Jeff Burton; Color-commentator: Steve Letarte; Color-commentator: Dale Earnhardt Jr.	Dave Burns; Kim Coon; Marty Snider

=== Radio ===
PRN had the radio call for the race, which was also simulcast on Sirius XM NASCAR Radio. Doug Rice & Mark Garrow covered the action for PRN when the field races down the front straightaway. Nick Yeoman covered the action for PRN from a platform outside of Turns 1 & 2, & Mark Jaynes covered the action from a platform outside of Turns 3 & 4 for PRN. Brad Gillie, Brett McMillan and Wendy Venturini had the call from pit lane for PRN.

PRN
Booth announcers	Turn announcers	Pit reporters
Lead announcer: Doug Rice; Announcer: Mark Garrow	Turns 1 & 2: Nick Yeoman; Turns 3 & 4: Mark Jaynes	Brad Gillie; Brett McMillan; Wendy Venturini

== Standings after the race ==
Drivers' Championship standings

	Pos	Driver	Points
	1	William Byron	3,083
1	2	Denny Hamlin	3,074 (–9)
2	3	Chris Buescher	3,059 (–24)
3	4	Christopher Bell	3,057 (–26)
3	5	Martin Truex Jr.	3,056 (–27)
3	6	Ross Chastain	3,049 (–34)
3	7	Brad Keselowski	3,045 (–38)
4	8	Kyle Larson	3,039 (–44)
3	9	Bubba Wallace	3,037 (–46)
2	10	Tyler Reddick	3,036 (–47)
	11	Ryan Blaney	3,028 (–55)
6	12	Kyle Busch	3,022 (–61)
1	13	Kevin Harvick	2,102 (–981)
1	14	Ricky Stenhouse Jr.	2,096 (–987)
2	15	Joey Logano	2,087 (–996)
	16	Michael McDowell	2,087 (–996)
Official driver's standings

Manufacturers' Championship standings

Pos	Manufacturer	Points
1	Chevrolet	1,110
2	Toyota	1,042 (–68)
3	Ford	1,025 (–85)

- Note: Only the first 16 positions are included for the driver standings.

Previous race: 2023 Bass Pro Shops Night Race	NASCAR Cup Series; 2023 season	Next race: 2023 YellaWood 500
