= Cole Custer =

American racing driver (born 1998)

- Custer at Las Vegas Motor Speedway in 2026
- Born: Cole Matthew Custer; January 23, 1998 (age 28); Ladera Ranch, California, U.S.
- Achievements: 2023 NASCAR Xfinity Series Champion; 2024 NASCAR Xfinity Series Regular Season Champion; Youngest NASCAR Truck Series winner (16 in 2014); Youngest NASCAR K&N Pro Series West winner (15 years, 6 months, 10 days); 2nd youngest winner in a NASCAR-sanctioned race
- Awards: 2020 NASCAR Cup Series Rookie of the Year

NASCAR Cup Series career
- 189 races run over 7 years
- Car no., team: No. 41 (Haas Factory Team)
- 2026 position: 32nd
- Best finish: 16th (2020)
- First race: 2018 Pennzoil 400 (Las Vegas)
- Last race: 2026 Season Finale 400 (Homestead)
- First win: 2020 Quaker State 400 (Kentucky)
| Wins | Top tens | Poles |
|---|---|---|
| 1 | 17 | 1 |

NASCAR O'Reilly Auto Parts Series career
- 181 races run over 9 years
- 2026 position: 77th
- Best finish: 1st (2023)
- First race: 2016 ToyotaCare 250 (Richmond)
- Last race: 2026 Cuervo 300 (Chicagoland)
- First win: 2017 Ford EcoBoost 300 (Homestead)
- Last win: 2024 Food City 300 (Bristol)
| Wins | Top tens | Poles |
|---|---|---|
| 15 | 122 | 21 |

NASCAR FedEx Freight Truck Series career
- 42 races run over 3 years
- 2016 position: 10th
- Best finish: 10th (2016)
- First race: 2014 Kroger 250 (Martinsville)
- Last race: 2016 Ford EcoBoost 200 (Homestead)
- First win: 2014 UNOH 175 (New Hampshire)
- Last win: 2015 Drivin' for Lineman 200 (Gateway)
| Wins | Top tens | Poles |
|---|---|---|
| 2 | 24 | 5 |

ARCA Menards Series career
- 6 races run over 3 years
- Best finish: 41st (2015)
- First race: 2015 ARCA 150 presented by Unique Pretzels (Millville)
- Last race: 2017 Road America 100 (Road America)
- First win: 2015 ModSpace 125 (Pocono)
| Wins | Top tens | Poles |
|---|---|---|
| 1 | 4 | 2 |

ARCA Menards Series East career
- 23 races run over 4 years
- Best finish: 8th (2013)
- First race: 2013 DRIVE4COPD 125 (Bristol)
- Last race: 2016 Bully Hill Vineyards 100 (Watkins Glen)
- First win: 2013 Pork Be Inspired 150 (Iowa)
- Last win: 2014 Blue Ox 100 (Richmond)
| Wins | Top tens | Poles |
|---|---|---|
| 3 | 10 | 3 |

ARCA Menards Series West career
- 9 races run over 5 years
- Best finish: 20th (2014)
- First race: 2013 G-Oil 150 (Stockton)
- Last race: 2023 General Tire 200 (Sonoma)
- First win: 2014 Talking Stick Resort 75 (Phoenix)
| Wins | Top tens | Poles |
|---|---|---|
| 1 | 6 | 2 |
- Statistics up to date as of November 8, 2026.

Cole Matthew Custer (born January 23, 1998) is an American professional stock car racing driver. He competes full-time in the NASCAR Cup Series, driving the No. 41 Chevrolet Camaro ZL1 for Haas Factory Team. He is the son of Joe Custer, the team president of HFT. He is the 2023 NASCAR Xfinity Series champion.

== Racing career ==
=== Early career ===
Custer began racing quarter midget at the age of four. In 2011, Custer won the USAC National Focus Young Guns Championship. The following year, Custer began racing late models, winning ten races and earning Rookie of the Year honors.

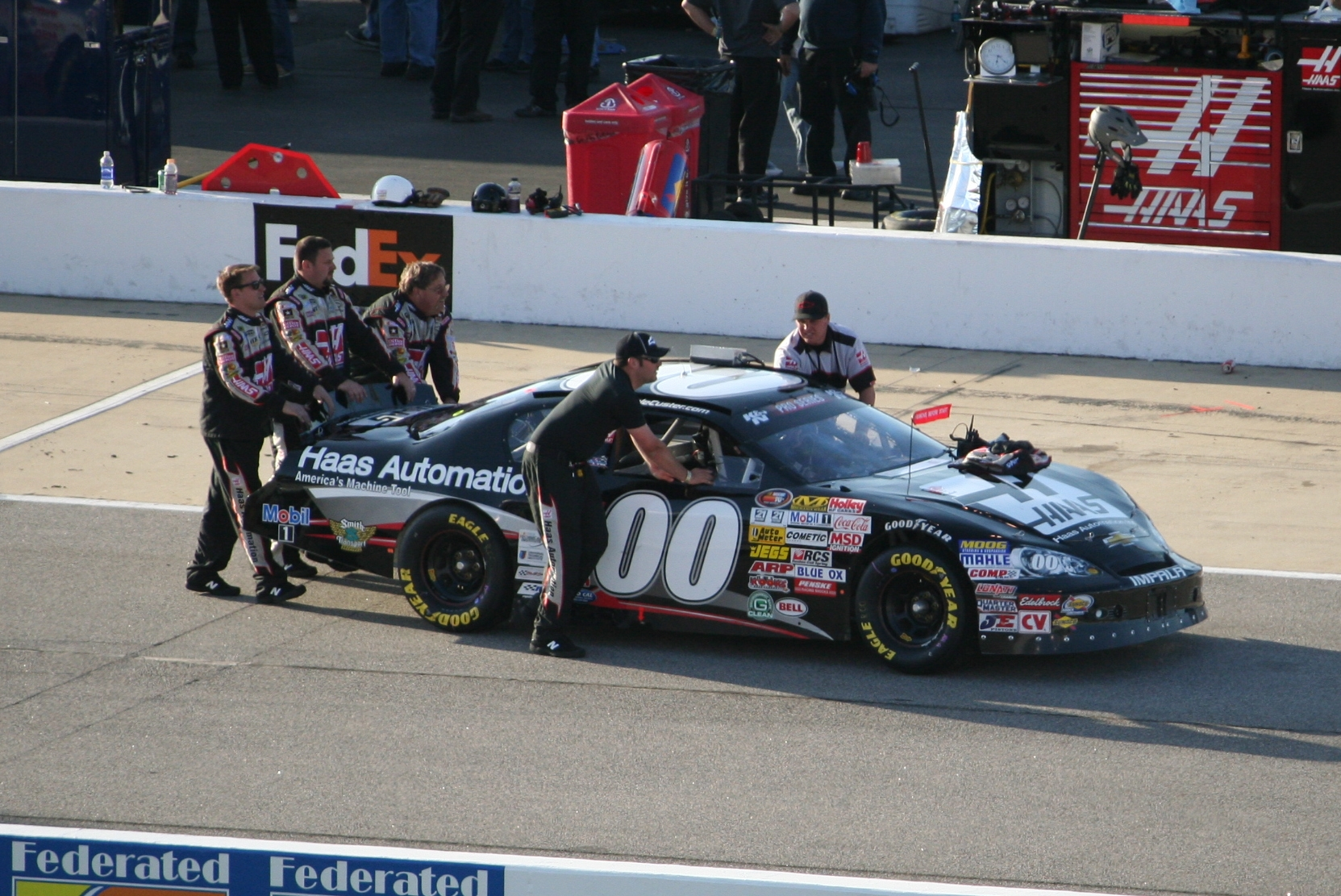
Custer's No. 00 Pro Series East car at Richmond International Raceway in 2013

In 2013, Custer joined the K&N Pro Series East, making his debut at Bristol Motor Speedway for Ken Schrader Racing. During the season at Iowa Speedway, Custer won the pole position, led every lap, a record for a combination race, and won, becoming the youngest race winner in K&N Pro Series history at the age of fifteen, beating Dylan Kwasniewski's record by six months. (Note: The current youngest K&N Pro Series winner is Gray Gaulding, winning at Phoenix International Raceway at 15 years, 8 months and 30 days.) Custer would win again at New Hampshire Motor Speedway, also from the pole. He finished eighth in the series standings. Custer later ran in the K&N Pro Series West's season-ending race. Custer led every single lap, but was turned by Gray Gaulding on the final lap, and finished sixth.

In the 2014 season, Custer won the Pro Series West opener at Phoenix International Raceway, holding off Greg Pursley and Brennan Newberry on the green–white–checker finish.

=== 2014–2016: Camping World Truck Series ===
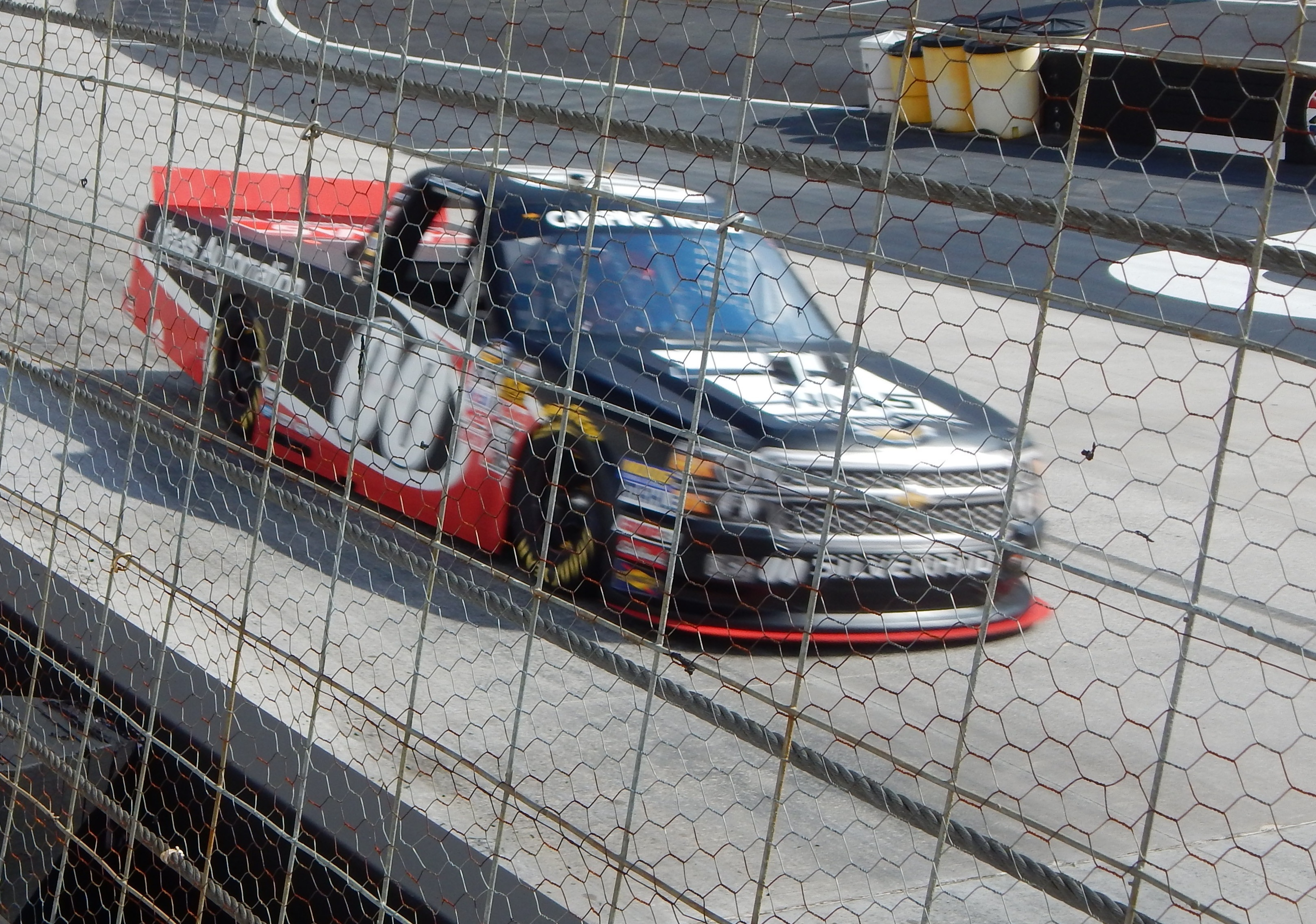
Custer at Bristol Motor Speedway in 2015

In 2014, Custer joined Haas Racing Development to run nine races in the NASCAR Camping World Truck Series, making his debut in the Kroger 250 at Martinsville Speedway. Custer started the race ninth, and finished twelfth. In qualifying for the Drivin' for Linemen 200 at Gateway Motorsports Park, Custer set the track record with a 136.426 miles per hour (219.556 km/h) lap speed, becoming the youngest pole winner in NASCAR history.

At New Hampshire Motor Speedway on September 20, 2014, Custer won the Camping World Truck Series UNOH 175 from the pole, becoming the youngest winner in the history of NASCAR's national touring series at sixteen years, seven months and 28 days. (Note: NASCAR's "national touring series" include the NASCAR Cup Series, Xfinity Series and Craftsman Truck Series; some include the 1972–1973 Grand National East Series as well.)

On January 12, 2015, JR Motorsports announced that Custer would drive a truck for them in ten races in 2015. On June 13, 2015, Custer won the Truck race at Gateway Motorsports Park, holding off the No. 23 truck of Spencer Gallagher, after the dominating trucks of Erik Jones and Matt Crafton were involved in two wrecks at laps 142 and 152.

When he turned eighteen years old in 2016, JR Motorsports began fielding the No. 00 truck for Custer full-time, competing for the Rookie of the Year title. At Canadian Tire Motorsport Park during the Chevrolet Silverado 250, John Hunter Nemechek and Custer were battling for the lead when Nemechek bumped Custer before running both Custer and himself off-road, pinning Custer to the wall. Before the winner was declared, Nemechek was tackled by Custer; Nemechek would be named the winner.

=== 2017–2019: First Xfinity Series Stint ===
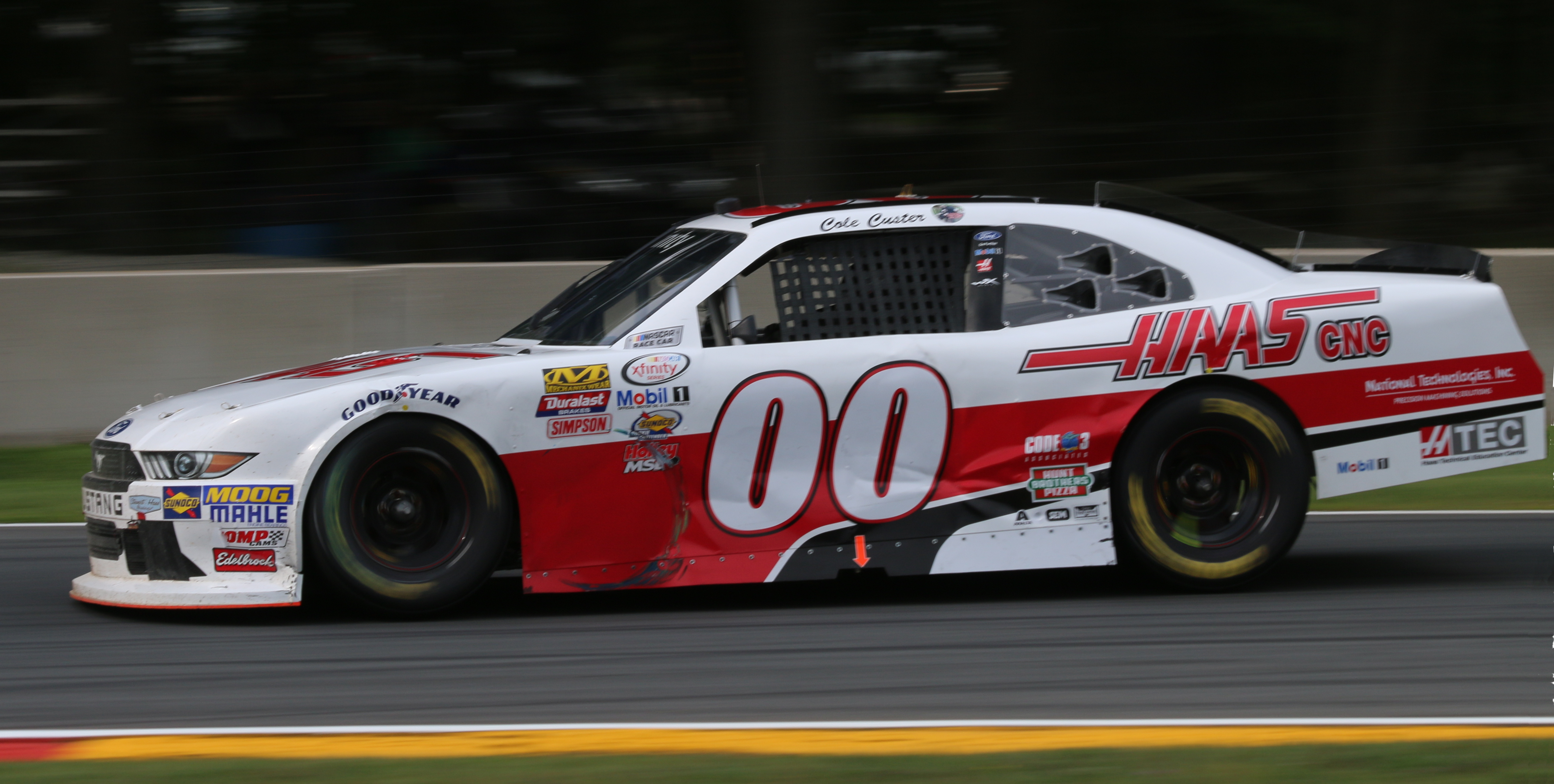
Custer at Road America in 2017

In 2016, Custer made his Xfinity Series debut for JR Motorsports at Richmond International Raceway, driving the No. 5 Chevrolet Camaro. He drove the No. 88 for JR Motorsports to the career-best fourth place finish at Charlotte in the Hisense 4K TV 300.

On September 16, 2016, Stewart–Haas Racing announced that Custer would drive the No. 00 Ford Mustang full-time in 2017, with Haas Automation as the primary sponsor. Custer began the 2017 Xfinity season with a crash at Daytona, finishing 37th. He rebounded the next week at Atlanta, finishing tenth.

After making the playoffs in his first appearance, Custer began making a surge at the end of the season, leading the most laps in Chicago and Kansas. Custer missed the Final Four by two spots after racing head-to-head with Daniel Hemric, the next week, Custer put on a clinic by leading the most laps, winning both stages and en route to his first Xfinity win at the Homestead–Miami Speedway in South Florida. The next year at the fall Texas race, Custer got his second career win when he passed Tyler Reddick on the last lap, clinching his spot in the Championship Four.

In the 2019 season, Custer scored wins at Fontana, Richmond, Pocono, Chicago, Kentucky, and Dover. He finished second at Darlington but was declared the official race winner after Denny Hamlin was disqualified when his car failed to meet height requirements during post-race inspection. At the end of the Kansas race, Custer got into a fight with Reddick on pit road. Custer finished the 2019 season second in points after finishing second again to Reddick at Homestead.

=== 2020–2022: First Cup Series Stint ===
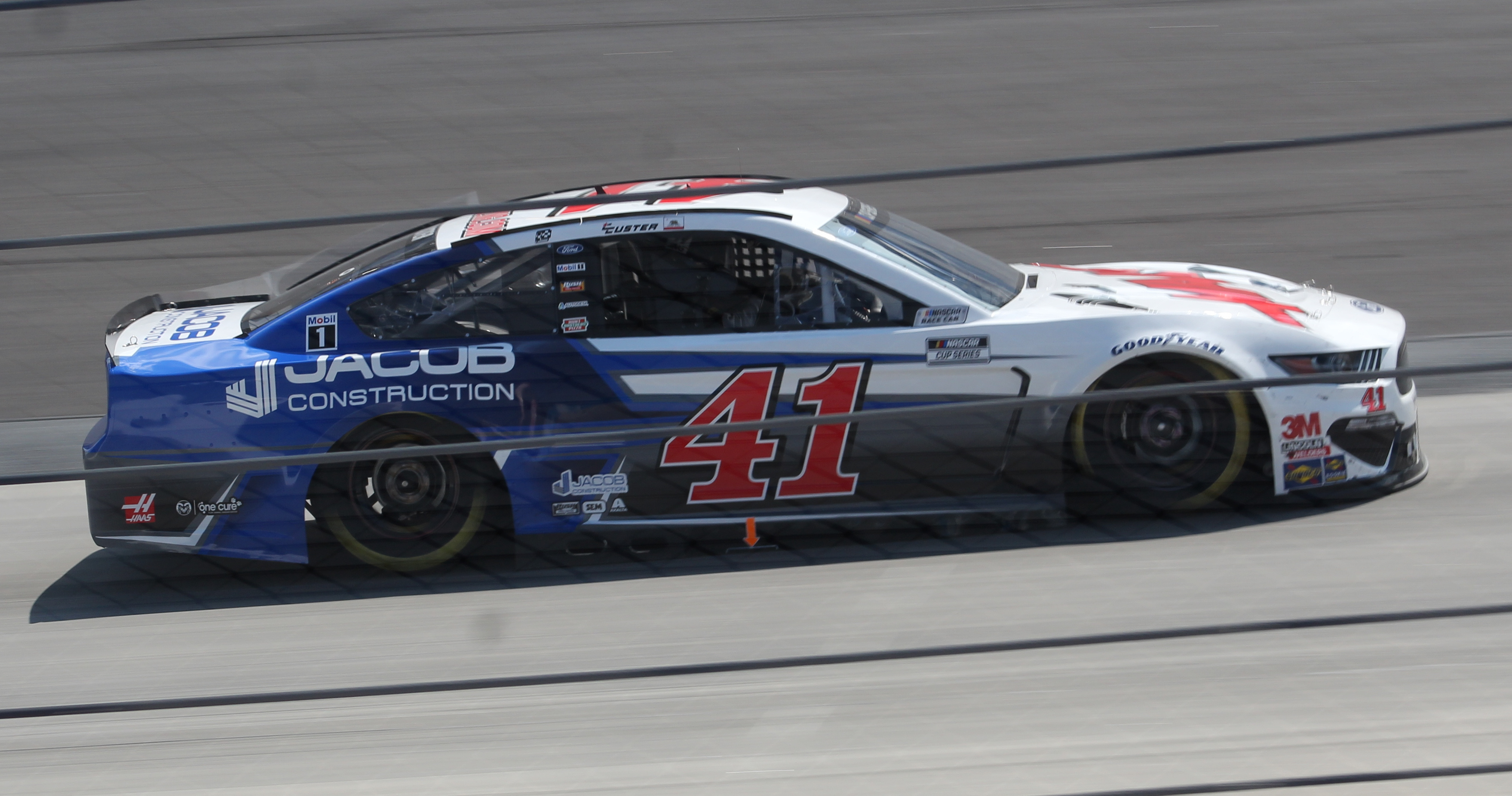
Custer's No. 41 car at Dover International Speedway in 2020

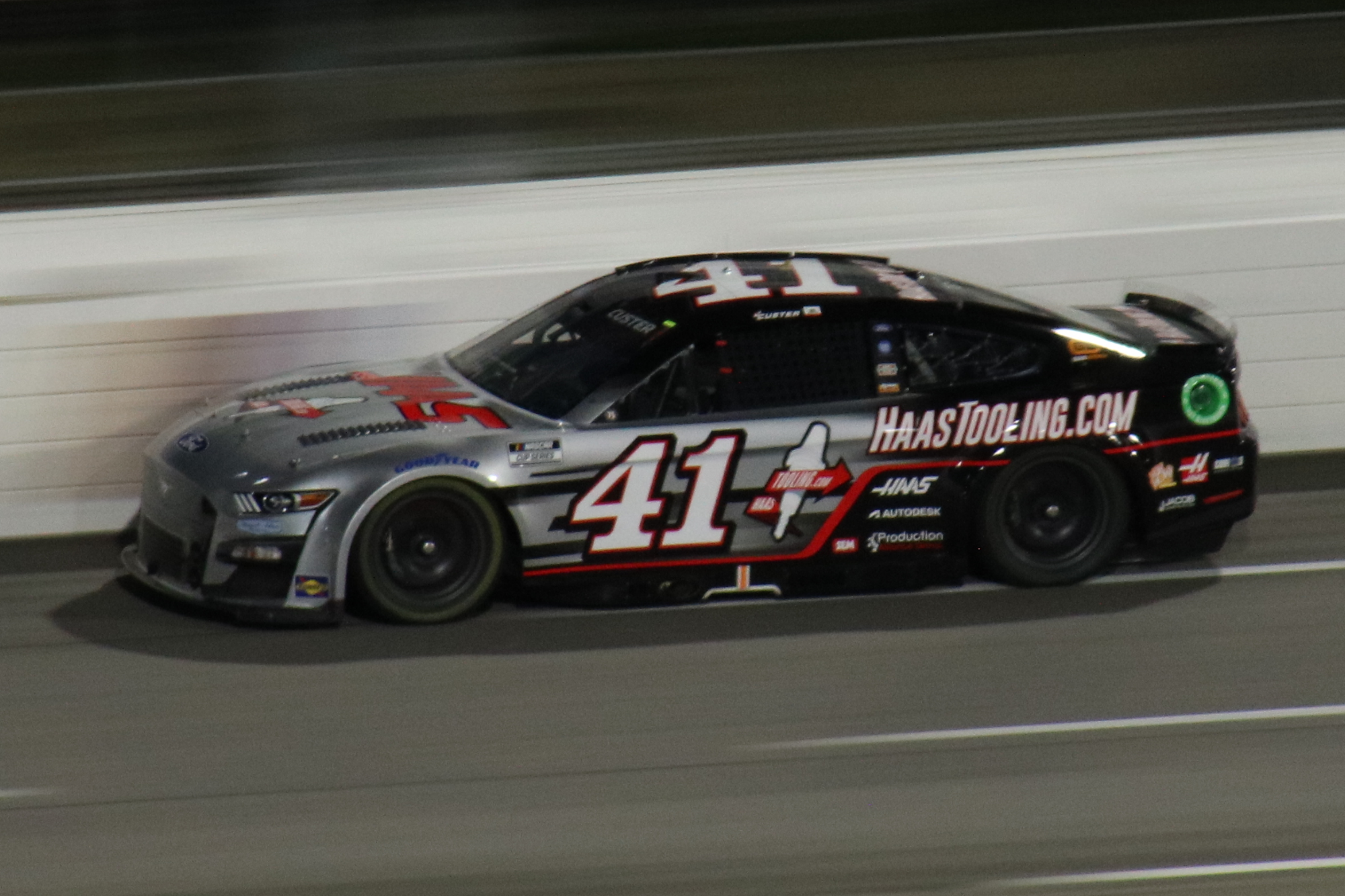
Custer at Martinsville Speedway in 2022

In March 2018, Custer joined Rick Ware Racing for his Monster Energy NASCAR Cup Series debut in the Pennzoil 400 at Las Vegas Motor Speedway. He finished 25th. He returned for the June Pocono race, where he would finish 26th. At Richmond Raceway in the fall, he qualified a surprising tenth, though he would go on to finish 26th.

On November 15, 2019, Stewart–Haas Racing announced that Custer would replace Daniel Suárez in the No. 41 Ford in 2020. He scored his first Cup top-ten finish at Phoenix, while his maiden top-five came at Indianapolis.

A week after Indianapolis, Custer won his first Cup race in the Quaker State 400 at Kentucky Speedway, passing Kevin Harvick, Martin Truex Jr., and Ryan Blaney on the last lap. He became the first rookie to win in the Cup Series since Chris Buescher in 2016, the first rookie to do so in a non-shortened race since Juan Pablo Montoya in 2007, and the 33rd driver to win a race in all three NASCAR national touring series. With the win, Custer made the 2020 Playoffs, but was eliminated following the first round at Bristol. He finished sixteenth in the points standings and was awarded the Sunoco Rookie of the Year honors. Custer remained with Stewart–Haas for the 2021 season. However, his results were inconsistent, and he missed the playoffs after the regular-season finale at Daytona as he was 26th in the points standings with just two top tens at Talladega and Dover.

After a two-year absence, Custer returned to the Xfinity Series in May 2021 at Circuit of the Americas, driving the No. 17 for SS-Green Light Racing and Rick Ware Racing in a collaboration with Stewart–Haas Racing.

Custer returned to the Xfinity Series competition in February 2022 at Auto Club Speedway, driving the No. 07 for SS-Green Light Racing in collaboration with Stewart–Haas Racing. He would end up winning the race after leading eighty laps. It was his tenth career Xfinity Series win, and the first win for SS-Green Light Racing.

On October 11, 2022, Custer and crew chief Mike Shiplett were fined US$100,000 after Custer intentionally slowed down and checked up on the last lap of the Charlotte Roval race, allowing his SHR teammate Chase Briscoe to advance to the next round of the playoffs. In addition, Shiplett was indefinitely suspended, and the No. 41 team was docked fifty owner and driver points.

=== 2023–2024: Back to the Xfinity Series ===
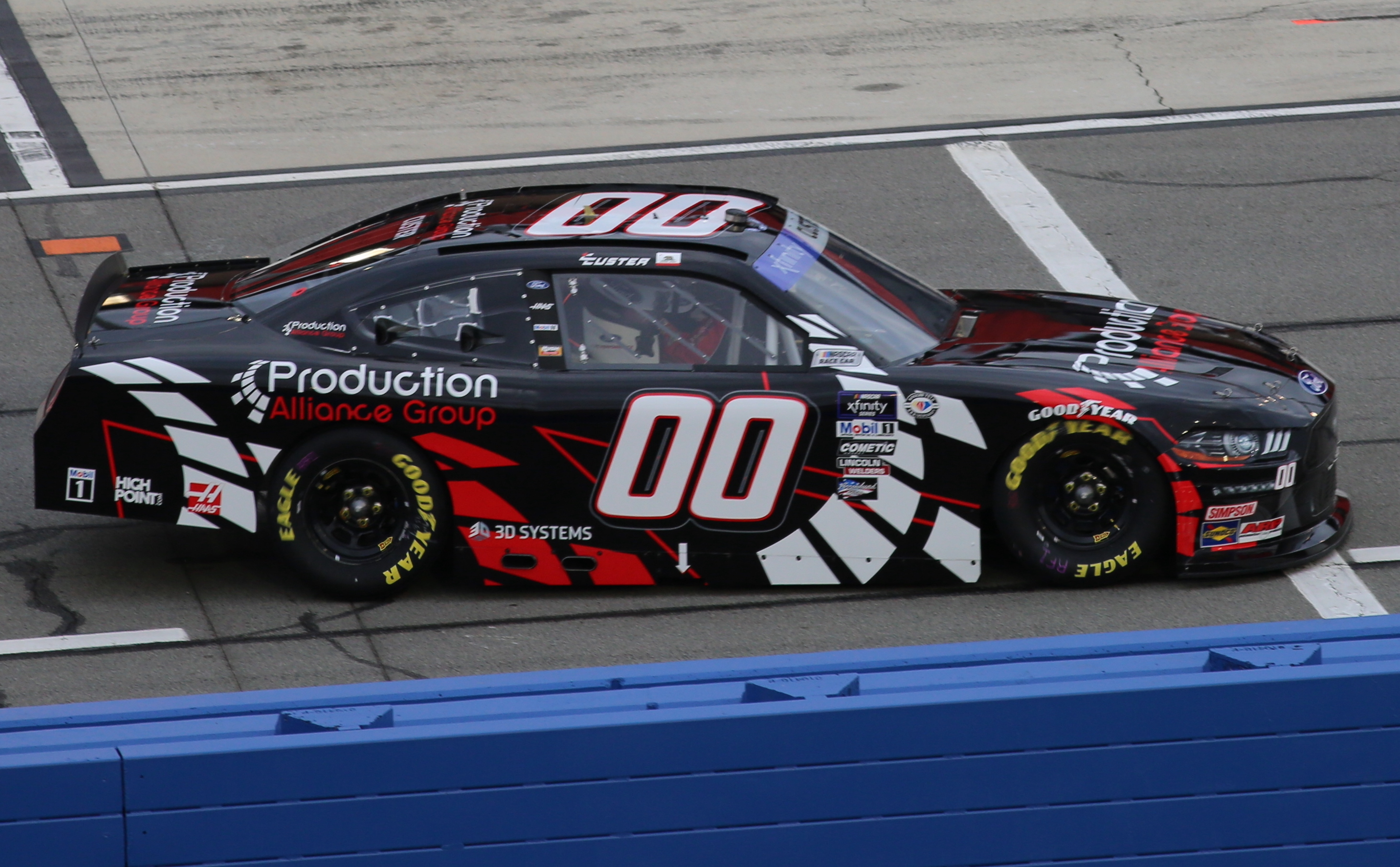
Custer at Auto Club Speedway in 2023

On November 16, 2022, SHR announced that Ryan Preece would replace Custer in the No. 41 in the Cup Series in 2023 while Custer would move back to the Xfinity Series, driving a second full-time car for SHR. The team announced on November 23, 2022, that he would drive the No. 00 once again. Custer started the 2023 season with a ninth-place finish at Daytona. He scored his first win of the season at Portland. Custer also won at a rain-shortened Chicago street race leading every single lap. Following the Michigan race, the No. 00 was docked twenty driver and owner points and five playoff points, and crew chief Jonathan Toney was fined US$25,000 after the post-race inspection revealed unapproved splitters.

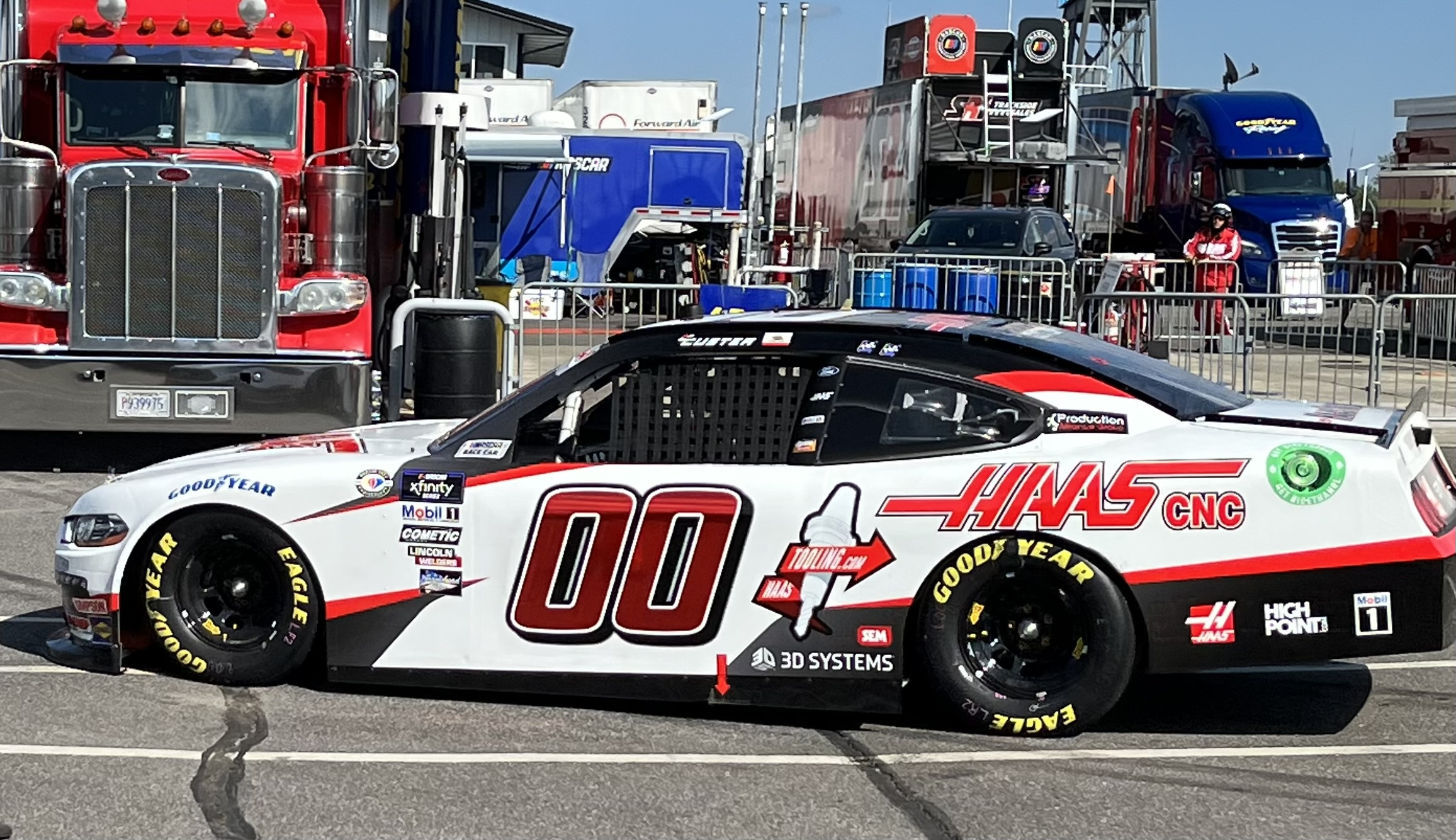
Custer's No. 00 car at Pocono Raceway in 2023

On July 3, 2023, Rick Ware Racing announced that Custer would return to the Cup Series to drive the No. 51 at Atlanta, New Hampshire, and Pocono.

On November 2, 2023, Custer announced he would continue in the No. 00 in 2024. Two days later, Custer would go on to win his and Stewart–Haas's first Xfinity Series championship at Phoenix Raceway after holding off Justin Allgaier and John Hunter Nemechek on an overtime restart.

Custer started the 2024 season with a thirteenth-place finish at Daytona. He scored wins at Pocono and Bristol, as well as the regular season championship. Despite not winning a race during the playoffs, Custer stayed consistent enough to make the Championship 4. After the race at Martinsville, Custer was involved in a post-race altercation with Chandler Smith.

On May 28, 2024, Stewart–Haas Racing announced it would shut down its NASCAR operations at the end of the season.

=== 2025: Return to Cup Series ===
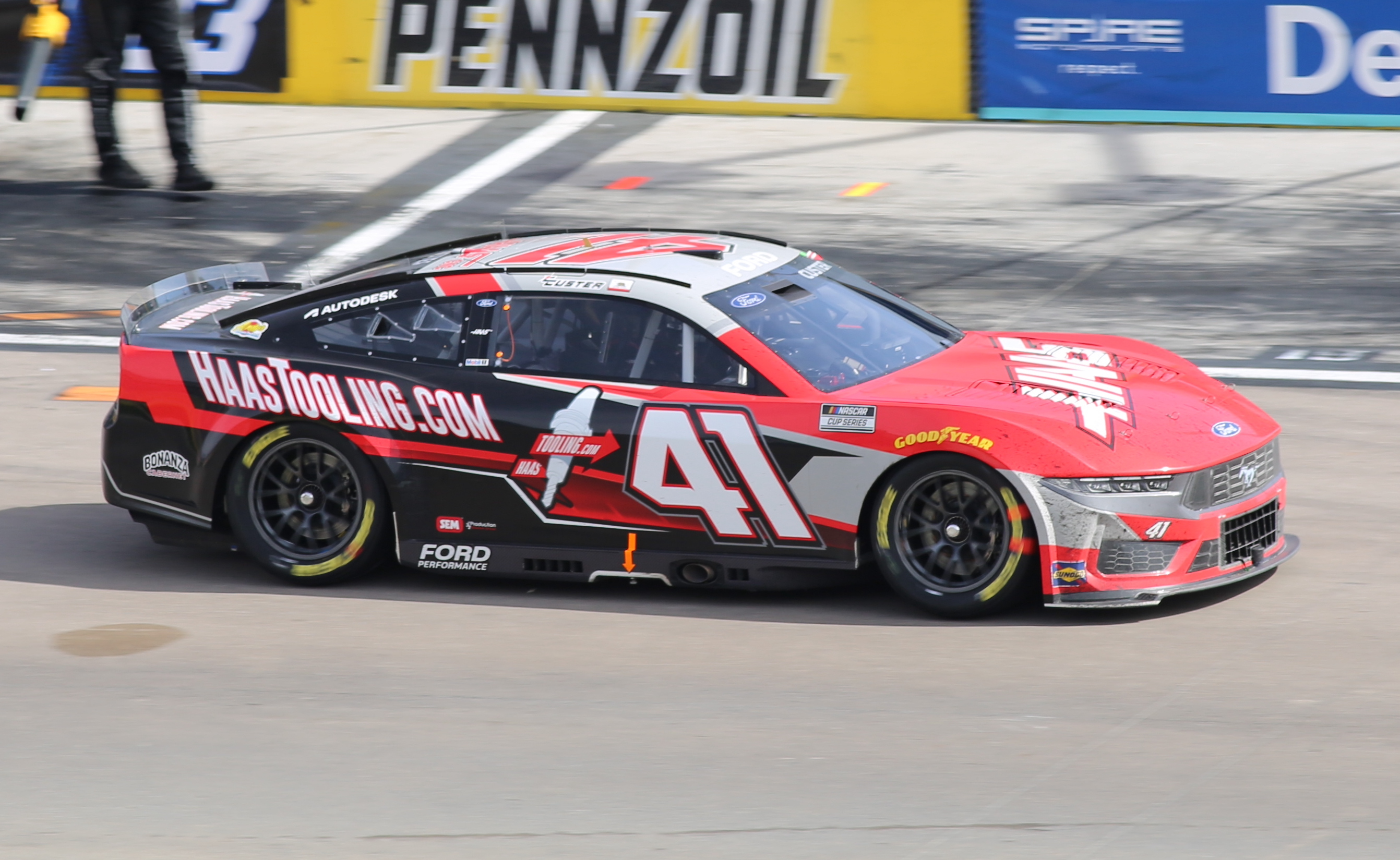
Custer's No. 41 car at Las Vegas Motor Speedway in 2025

On July 20, 2024, Custer announced his Cup Series return in 2025 with the No. 41 of Haas Factory Team, which is a reorganization of Stewart–Haas Racing. He started the 2025 season with a 21st place finish at the 2025 Daytona 500. Custer struggled throughout the season, with eighth at Mexico, fourth at the summer Daytona race, and fifth at the fall Talladega race being his only top-ten finishes.

== Personal life ==
Born in Ladera Ranch, California, Custer is the son of Joe Custer, who is the team president of Haas Factory Team and the chief operating officer of Haas F1 Team. HFR co-owner Gene Haas' company, Haas Automation, sponsors Custer. He attended Ladera Ranch Middle School and Tesoro High School.

He is married to Kari Custer. In July 2024, Kari gave birth to a son.

== Motorsports career results ==
=== Career summary ===
| Season | Series | Team | Races | Wins | Top 5 | Top 10 | Points | Position |
|---|---|---|---|---|---|---|---|---|
| 2013 | NASCAR K&N Pro Series East | Ken Schrader Racing | 14 | 2 | 5 | 6 | 452 | 8th |
| 2013 | NASCAR K&N Pro Series West | Ken Schrader Racing | 2 | 0 | 0 | 1 | 66 | 38th |
| 2014 | NASCAR Camping World Truck Series | Haas Racing Development | 9 | 1 | 2 | 6 | 302 | 25th |
| 2014 | NASCAR K&N Pro Series East | Bill McAnally Racing | 7 | 1 | 2 | 2 | 234 | 20th |
| 2014 | NASCAR K&N Pro Series West | Bill McAnally Racing | 3 | 1 | 2 | 2 | 121 | 20th |
| 2015 | ARCA Racing Series | JR Motorsports | 3 | 1 | 2 | 2 | 560 | 41st |
| 2015 | NASCAR Camping World Truck Series | JR Motorsports | 10 | 1 | 2 | 4 | 305 | 22nd |
| 2015 | NASCAR K&N Pro Series East | Bill McAnally Racing | 1 | 0 | 1 | 1 | 40 | 43rd |
| 2015 | NASCAR K&N Pro Series West | Bill McAnally Racing | 1 | 0 | 0 | 1 | 35 | 47th |
| 2016 | ARCA Racing Series | Ken Schrader Racing | 1 | 0 | 0 | 1 | 390 | 69th |
| 2016 | ARCA Racing Series | Athenian Motorsports | 1 | 0 | 0 | 1 | 390 | 69th |
| 2016 | NASCAR Camping World Truck Series | JR Motorsports | 23 | 0 | 5 | 14 | 502 | 10th |
| 2016 | NASCAR K&N Pro Series East | HScott Motorsports | 1 | 0 | 1 | 1 | 41 | 44th |
| 2016 | NASCAR Xfinity Series | JR Motorsports | 5 | 0 | 1 | 2 | 0 | NC† |
| 2017 | ARCA Racing Series | Mason Mitchell Motorsports | 1 | 0 | 0 | 0 | 175 | 88th |
| 2017 | NASCAR Xfinity Series | Stewart–Haas Racing | 33 | 1 | 7 | 19 | 2288 | 5th |
| 2018 | NASCAR Cup Series | Rick Ware Racing | 3 | 0 | 0 | 0 | 0 | NC† |
| 2018 | NASCAR Xfinity Series | Stewart–Haas Racing with Biagi–DenBeste | 33 | 1 | 14 | 26 | 4035 | **2nd** |
| 2019 | NASCAR K&N Pro Series West | Sunrise Ford Racing | 1 | 0 | 1 | 1 | 40 | 39th |
| 2019 | NASCAR Xfinity Series | Stewart–Haas Racing with Biagi–DenBeste | 33 | 7 | 17 | 24 | 4035 | **2nd** |
| 2020 | NASCAR Cup Series | Stewart–Haas Racing | 36 | 1 | 2 | 7 | 2202 | 16th |
| 2021 | NASCAR Cup Series | Stewart–Haas Racing | 36 | 0 | 0 | 2 | 575 | 26th |
| 2021 | NASCAR Xfinity Series | SS-Green Light Racing with Rick Ware Racing | 1 | 0 | 0 | 1 | 0 | NC† |
| 2022 | NASCAR Cup Series | Stewart–Haas Racing | 36 | 0 | 0 | 3 | 589 | 25th |
| 2022 | NASCAR Xfinity Series | SS-Green Light Racing | 5 | 1 | 2 | 3 | 0 | NC† |
| 2023 | ARCA Menards Series West | High Point Racing | 2 | 0 | 1 | 1 | 70 | 26th |
| 2023 | NASCAR Cup Series | Rick Ware Racing | 6 | 0 | 0 | 0 | 0 | NC† |
| 2023 | NASCAR Xfinity Series | Stewart–Haas Racing | 33 | 3 | 14 | 21 | 4040 | **1st** |
| 2024 | NASCAR Xfinity Series | Stewart–Haas Racing | 33 | 2 | 14 | 23 | 4035 | **2nd** |
| 2025 | NASCAR Cup Series | Haas Factory Team | 36 | 0 | 2 | 3 | 486 | 32nd |

^{†} As Custer was a guest driver, he was ineligible for championship points.

=== NASCAR ===
(key) (Bold – Pole position awarded by qualifying time. Italics – Pole position earned by points standings or practice time. * – Most laps led. ** – All laps led.)

==== Cup Series ====
NASCAR Cup Series results
| Year | Team | No. | Make | 1 | 2 | 3 | 4 | 5 | 6 | 7 | 8 | 9 | 10 | 11 | 12 | 13 | 14 | 15 | 16 | 17 | 18 | 19 | 20 | 21 | 22 | 23 | 24 | 25 | 26 | 27 | 28 | 29 | 30 | 31 | 32 | 33 | 34 | 35 | 36 | NCSC | Pts | Ref |
|---|---|---|---|---|---|---|---|---|---|---|---|---|---|---|---|---|---|---|---|---|---|---|---|---|---|---|---|---|---|---|---|---|---|---|---|---|---|---|---|---|---|---|
| 2018 | Rick Ware Racing | 51 | Ford | DAY | ATL | LVS; 25 | PHO | CAL | MAR | TEX | BRI | RCH | TAL | DOV | KAN | CLT | POC; 26 | MCH | SON | CHI | DAY | KEN | NHA | POC | GLN | MCH | BRI | DAR | IND | LVS | RCH; 26 | ROV | DOV | TAL | KAN | MAR | TEX | PHO | HOM | 63rd | 0^{1} | |
| 2020 | Stewart–Haas Racing | 41 | Ford | DAY; 37 | LVS; 19 | CAL; 18 | PHO; 9 | DAR; 22 | DAR; 31 | CLT; 12 | CLT; 18 | BRI; 35 | ATL; 19 | MAR; 29 | HOM; 22 | TAL; 22 | POC; 16 | POC; 17 | IND; 5 | KEN; 1 | TEX; 39 | KAN; 7 | NHA; 8 | MCH; 34 | MCH; 25 | DRC; 22 | DOV; 11 | DOV; 10 | DAY; 30 | DAR; 12 | RCH; 14 | BRI; 23 | LVS; 16 | TAL; 31 | ROV; 9 | KAN; 14 | TEX; 14 | MAR; 13 | PHO; 28 | 16th | 2202 | |
| 2021 | Stewart–Haas Racing | 41 | Ford | DAY; 11 | DRC; 13 | HOM; 23 | LVS; 25 | PHO; 31 | ATL; 18 | BRD; 24 | MAR; 18 | RCH; 23 | TAL; 10 | KAN; 24 | DAR; 36 | DOV; 10 | COA; 36 | CLT; 21 | SON; 20 | NSH; 30 | POC; 38 | POC; 24 | ROA; 17 | ATL; 17 | NHA; 14 | GLN; 17 | IRC; 25 | MCH; 23 | DAY; 24 | DAR; 11 | RCH; 22 | BRI; 28 | LVS; 29 | TAL; 13 | ROV; 18 | TEX; 19 | KAN; 18 | MAR; 23 | PHO; 13 | 26th | 575 | |
| 2022 | Stewart–Haas Racing | 41 | Ford | DAY; 20 | CAL; 11 | LVS; 33 | PHO; 16 | ATL; 34 | COA; 23 | RCH; 22 | MAR; 21 | **BRD**; 13 | TAL; 29 | DOV; 15 | DAR; 26 | KAN; 22 | CLT; 21 | GTW; 29 | SON; 21 | NSH; 26 | ROA; 15 | ATL; 9 | NHA; 27 | POC; 17 | IRC; 9 | MCH; 31 | RCH; 26 | GLN; 11 | DAY; 16 | DAR; 14 | KAN; 22 | BRI; 8 | TEX; 35 | TAL; 21 | ROV; 24 | LVS; 20 | HOM; 24 | MAR; 14 | PHO; 16 | 25th | 589 | |
| 2023 | Rick Ware Racing | 51 | Ford | DAY | CAL | LVS | PHO | ATL | COA | RCH | BRD | MAR | TAL | DOV | KAN | DAR | CLT | GTW | SON | NSH | CSC | ATL; 32 | NHA; 35 | POC; 25 | RCH | MCH; 25 | IRC | GLN; 28 | DAY | DAR | KAN; 24 | BRI | TEX | TAL | ROV | LVS | HOM | MAR | | 52nd | 0^{1} | |
| 2023 | RFK Racing | 6 | Ford | | | | | | | | | | | | | | | | | | | | | | | | | | | | | | | | | | | | PHO; QL^{†} | 52nd | 0^{1} | |
| 2025 | Haas Factory Team | 41 | Ford | DAY; 21 | ATL; 36 | COA; 23 | PHO; 32 | LVS; 26 | HOM; 28 | MAR; 33 | DAR; 22 | BRI; 29 | TAL; 13 | TEX; 19 | KAN; 25 | CLT; 21 | NSH; 19 | MCH; 35 | MXC; 8 | POC; 22 | ATL; 19 | CSC; 33 | SON; 23 | DOV; 29 | IND; 20 | IOW; 26 | GLN; 34 | RCH; 24 | DAY; 4 | DAR; 24 | GTW; 27 | BRI; 33 | NHA; 24 | KAN; 20 | ROV; 22 | LVS; 28 | TAL; 5 | MAR; 17 | PHO; 25 | 32nd | 486 | |
| 2026 | Haas Factory Team | 41 | Chevy | DAY; 24 | ATL; 22 | COA; 29 | PHO; 35 | LVS; 27 | DAR; 28 | MAR; 31 | BRI; 28 | KAN; 25 | TAL; 38 | TEX; 35 | GLN; 15 | CLT; 16 | NSH; 21 | MCH; 12 | POC; 24 | COR; 31 | SON; 20 | CHI; 31 | ATL; 17 | NWS; 28 | IND; 13 | IOW; 28 | RCH; 29 | NHA; 22 | DAY; 10 | DAR; 33 | GTW; 11 | BRI; 26 | KAN; 30 | LVS; 27 | CLT; 27 | PHO; 27 | TAL; 5 | MAR; 34 | HOM; 29 | 32nd | 450 | |
^{†} – Qualified for Brad Keselowski

===== Daytona 500 =====
| Year | Team | Manufacturer | Start | Finish |
|---|---|---|---|---|
| 2020 | Stewart–Haas Racing | Ford | 12 | 37 |
| 2021 | Stewart–Haas Racing | Ford | 27 | 11 |
| 2022 | Stewart–Haas Racing | Ford | 31 | 20 |
| 2025 | Haas Factory Team | Ford | 30 | 21 |
| 2026 | Haas Factory Team | Ford | 23 | 24 |

==== O'Reilly Auto Parts Series ====
NASCAR O'Reilly Auto Parts Series results
| Year | Team | No. | Make | 1 | 2 | 3 | 4 | 5 | 6 | 7 | 8 | 9 | 10 | 11 | 12 | 13 | 14 | 15 | 16 | 17 | 18 | 19 | 20 | 21 | 22 | 23 | 24 | 25 | 26 | 27 | 28 | 29 | 30 | 31 | 32 | 33 | NOAPSC | Pts | Ref |
|---|---|---|---|---|---|---|---|---|---|---|---|---|---|---|---|---|---|---|---|---|---|---|---|---|---|---|---|---|---|---|---|---|---|---|---|---|---|---|---|
| 2016 | JR Motorsports | 5 | Chevy | DAY | ATL | LVS | PHO | CAL | TEX | BRI | RCH; 6 | TAL | DOV | | | | | | | | | | | | | | | | | | | CLT; DNQ | KAN; 35 | TEX | PHO | HOM; 17 | 100th | 0^{1} | |
| 2016 | JR Motorsports | 88 | Chevy | | | | | | | | | | | CLT; 4 | POC | MCH | IOW | DAY | KEN; 32 | NHA | IND | IOW | GLN | MOH | BRI | ROA | DAR | RCH | CHI | KEN | DOV | | | | | | 100th | 0^{1} | |
| 2017 | Stewart–Haas Racing | 00 | Ford | DAY; 37 | ATL; 10 | LVS; 11 | PHO; 21 | CAL; 35 | TEX; 5 | BRI; 32 | RCH; 13 | TAL; 26 | CLT; 7 | DOV; 4 | POC; 7 | MCH; 10 | IOW; 24 | DAY; 22 | KEN; 11 | NHA; 9 | IND; 5 | IOW; 5 | GLN; 12 | MOH; 35 | BRI; 10 | ROA; 8 | DAR; 9 | RCH; 14 | CHI; 7 | KEN; 5 | DOV; 8 | CLT; 6 | KAN; 19 | TEX; 5 | PHO; 7 | HOM; 1* | 5th | 2288 | |
| 2018 | Stewart–Haas Racing with Biagi–DenBeste | 00 | Ford | DAY; 14 | ATL; 39 | LVS; 9 | PHO; 8 | CAL; 6 | TEX; 4 | **BRI**; 8 | **RCH**; 6 | TAL; 9 | DOV; 13 | CLT; 2 | **POC**; 5 | MCH; 3 | IOW; 4 | CHI; 3 | DAY; 25 | **KEN**; 5 | NHA; 9 | IOW; 9* | GLN; 6 | MOH; 7 | BRI; 4 | ROA; 4 | DAR; 2 | IND; 29 | **LVS**; 3 | RCH; 15 | ROV; 7 | DOV; 2 | KAN; 26 | TEX; 1 | PHO; 8 | **HOM**; 2* | 2nd | 4035 | |
| 2019 | Stewart–Haas Racing with Biagi–DenBeste | 00 | Ford | DAY; 14 | ATL; 2 | LVS; 9 | PHO; 4 | CAL; 1 | TEX; 34 | **BRI**; 3 | RCH; 1* | TAL; 32 | **DOV**; 4* | CLT; 24 | **POC**; 1* | MCH; 12 | **IOW**; 2 | CHI; 1* | DAY; 26 | KEN; 1* | **NHA**; 2 | IOW; 29 | GLN; 7 | MOH; 8 | BRI; 22 | ROA; 10 | DAR; 1 | IND; 7 | **LVS**; 4 | RCH; 3 | ROV; 8 | DOV; 1 | KAN; 11* | TEX; 8 | PHO; 2 | HOM; 2 | 2nd | 4035 | |
| 2021 | SS-Green Light Racing with Rick Ware Racing | 17 | Ford | DAY | DRC | HOM | LVS | PHO | ATL | MAR | TAL | DAR | DOV | COA; 7 | CLT | MOH | TEX | NSH | POC | ROA | ATL | NHA | GLN | IRC | MCH | DAY | DAR | RCH | BRI | LVS | TAL | ROV | TEX | KAN | MAR | PHO | 85th | 0^{1} | |
| 2022 | SS-Green Light Racing | 07 | Ford | DAY | CAL; 1* | LVS | PHO | ATL | COA; 3 | RCH | MAR | TAL | DOV | DAR | TEX | CLT | PIR | NSH | ROA; 25 | ATL | NHA | POC; 10 | IRC | MCH | GLN; 11 | DAY | DAR | KAN | BRI | TEX | TAL | ROV | LVS | HOM | MAR | PHO | 75th | 0^{1} | |
| 2023 | Stewart–Haas Racing | 00 | Ford | DAY; 9 | CAL; 27 | LVS; 12 | **PHO**; 12 | ATL; 12 | COA; 32 | RCH; 5 | **MAR**; 3 | TAL; 4 | DOV; 7 | DAR; 3 | CLT; 3 | PIR; 1 | SON; 6 | **NSH**; 9 | **CSC**; 1** | ATL; 3 | NHA; 22 | POC; 33 | ROA; 30 | MCH; 16 | IRC; 6 | GLN; 7 | DAY; 5 | DAR; 4 | KAN; 36 | **BRI**; 4 | TEX; 6 | ROV; 2 | LVS; 3 | **HOM**; 13* | MAR; 19 | PHO; 1* | 1st | 4040 | |
| 2024 | Stewart–Haas Racing | 00 | Ford | DAY; 13 | ATL; 16 | **LVS**; 2 | **PHO**; 5 | COA; 4 | RCH; 10 | MAR; 8 | TEX; 5 | TAL; 10 | DOV; 5* | DAR; 3 | CLT; 32 | PIR; 6 | SON; 9 | IOW; 6 | NHA; 3* | NSH; 9 | CSC; 18 | POC; 1 | **IND**; 2* | MCH; 30 | DAY; 32 | DAR; 2 | ATL; 31 | GLN; 21 | BRI; 1* | KAN; 2 | TAL; 26 | ROV; 13 | LVS; 8 | HOM; 2 | MAR; 4 | PHO; 8 | 2nd | 4029 | |
| 2026 | SS-Green Light Racing with BRK Racing | 0 | Chevy | DAY | ATL | COA | PHO | LVS; 18 | DAR | MAR | CAR | BRI | KAN; 7 | TAL | TEX | GLN | DOV | CLT; 8 | NSH | POC; 12 | COR | SON | CHI; 9 | ATL | IND | IOW | DAY | DAR | GTW | BRI | LVS | CLT | PHO | TAL | MAR | HOM | 77th | 0^{1} | |

==== Camping World Truck Series ====
NASCAR Camping World Truck Series results
| Year | Team | No. | Make | 1 | 2 | 3 | 4 | 5 | 6 | 7 | 8 | 9 | 10 | 11 | 12 | 13 | 14 | 15 | 16 | 17 | 18 | 19 | 20 | 21 | 22 | 23 | NCWTC | Pts | Ref |
|---|---|---|---|---|---|---|---|---|---|---|---|---|---|---|---|---|---|---|---|---|---|---|---|---|---|---|---|---|---|
| 2014 | Haas Racing Development | 00 | Chevy | DAY | MAR; 12 | KAN | CLT | DOV; 14 | TEX | **GTW**; 6 | KEN | IOW; 8 | ELD | POC | MCH | BRI; 8 | MSP; 9 | CHI | **NHA**; 1* | LVS | TAL | MAR; 29 | TEX | PHO; 3 | HOM | | 25th | 302 | |
| 2015 | JR Motorsports | 00 | Chevy | DAY | ATL | MAR; 16 | KAN | CLT | DOV; 13* | TEX | GTW; 1 | IOW; 9 | KEN | ELD; 29 | POC | MCH | BRI; 16* | MSP; 10* | CHI | NHA; 24 | LVS | TAL | **MAR**; 4* | TEX | PHO; 26 | HOM | 22nd | 305 | |
| 2016 | JR Motorsports | 00 | Chevy | DAY; 24 | ATL; 17 | MAR; 29 | KAN; 7 | DOV; 5 | CLT; 13 | TEX; 14 | IOW; 2 | GTW; 15 | KEN; 14 | ELD; 6 | POC; 5 | BRI; 6 | MCH; 22 | **MSP**; 2* | CHI; 9 | NHA; 6 | LVS; 3 | **TAL**; 29 | MAR; 7 | TEX; 9 | PHO; 10 | HOM; 10 | 10th | 502 | |

^{*} Season still in progress
^{1} Ineligible for series points

=== ARCA Racing Series ===
(key) (Bold – Pole position awarded by qualifying time. Italics – Pole position earned by points standings or practice time. * – Most laps led.)

ARCA Racing Series results
| Year | Team | No. | Make | 1 | 2 | 3 | 4 | 5 | 6 | 7 | 8 | 9 | 10 | 11 | 12 | 13 | 14 | 15 | 16 | 17 | 18 | 19 | 20 | ARSC | Pts | Ref |
|---|---|---|---|---|---|---|---|---|---|---|---|---|---|---|---|---|---|---|---|---|---|---|---|---|---|---|
| 2015 | JR Motorsports | 00 | Chevy | DAY | MOB | NSH | SLM | TAL | TOL | **NJE**; 5 | POC; 24 | MCH | CHI | WIN | IOW | IRP | POC; 1 | BLN | ISF | DQN | SLM | KEN | KAN | 41st | 560 | |
| 2016 | Ken Schrader Racing | 54 | Chevy | **DAY**; 10 | NSH | SLM | TAL | TOL | NJE | POC | MCH | MAD | WIN | | | | | | | | | | | 69th* | 390* | |
| 2016 | Athenian Motorsports | 05 | Chevy | | | | | | | | | | | IOW; 7 | IRP | POC | BLN | ISF | DSF | SLM | CHI | KEN | KAN | 69th* | 390* | |
| 2017 | Mason Mitchell Motorsports | 78 | Ford | DAY | NSH | SLM | TAL | TOL | ELK | POC | MCH | MAD | IOW | IRP | POC | WIN | ISF | ROA; 11 | DSF | SLM | CHI | KEN | KAN | 88th | 175 | |

==== K&N Pro Series East ====
NASCAR K&N Pro Series East results
| Year | Team | No. | Make | 1 | 2 | 3 | 4 | 5 | 6 | 7 | 8 | 9 | 10 | 11 | 12 | 13 | 14 | 15 | 16 | NKNPSEC | Pts | Ref |
|---|---|---|---|---|---|---|---|---|---|---|---|---|---|---|---|---|---|---|---|---|---|---|
| 2013 | Ken Schrader Racing | 00 | Chevy | BRI; 24 | GRE; 19 | FIF; 22 | RCH; 3 | BGS; 10 | IOW; 4 | LGY; 23 | COL; 15 | **IOW**; 1* | VIR; 19 | GRE; 16 | **NHA**; 1* | DOV; 14 | RAL; 5 | | | 8th | 452 | |
| 2014 | Bill McAnally Racing | 00 | Chevy | NSM | DAY | BRI; 14 | GRE | RCH; 1* | IOW; 11 | BGS | FIF | LGY | NHA | COL | IOW; 3 | GLN; 16 | VIR; 18 | GRE | DOV; 18 | 20th | 234 | |
| 2015 | Bill McAnally Racing | 00 | Toyota | NSM | GRE | BRI | IOW | BGS | LGY | COL | NHA | IOW | **GLN**; 5 | MOT | VIR | RCH | DOV | | | 43rd | 40 | |
| 2016 | HScott Motorsports with Justin Marks | 98 | Toyota | NSM | MOB | GRE | BRI | VIR | DOM | STA | COL | NHA | IOW | GLN; 3 | GRE | NJM | DOV | | | 44th | 41 | |

==== ARCA Menards Series West ====
ARCA Menards Series West results
| Year | Team | No. | Make | 1 | 2 | 3 | 4 | 5 | 6 | 7 | 8 | 9 | 10 | 11 | 12 | 13 | 14 | 15 | AMSWC | Pts | Ref |
|---|---|---|---|---|---|---|---|---|---|---|---|---|---|---|---|---|---|---|---|---|---|
| 2013 | Ken Schrader Racing | 00 | Ford | PHO | S99; 18 | BIR | IOW | L44 | SON | CNS | IOW | EVG | SPO | MMP | SMP | AAS | KCR | | 38th | 66 | |
| 2013 | Ken Schrader Racing | 00 | Chevy | | | | | | | | | | | | | | | **PHO**; 6* | 38th | 66 | |
| 2014 | Bill McAnally Racing | 00 | Chevy | **PHO**; 1* | IRW | S99 | IOW | KCR | | | | | | | | PHO; 3 | | | 20th | 121 | |
| 2014 | Bill McAnally Racing | 00 | Toyota | | | | | | SON; 12 | SLS | CNS | IOW | EVG | KCR | MMP | AAS | | | 20th | 121 | |
| 2015 | Bill McAnally Racing | 00 | Toyota | KCR | IRW | TUS | IOW | SHA | SON; 9 | SLS | IOW | EVG | CNS | MER | AAS | PHO | | | 47th | 35 | |
| 2019 | Sunrise Ford Racing | 22 | Ford | LVS | IRW | TUS | TUS | CNS | SON; 4 | DCS | IOW | EVG | GTW | MER | AAS | KCR | PHO | | 39th | 40 | |
| 2023 | High Point Racing | 55 | Ford | PHO | IRW | KCR | PIR; 2* | SON; 18 | IRW | SHA | EVG | AAS | LVS | MAD | PHO | | | | 26th | 70 | |

Sporting positions
| Preceded by Ty Gibbs | NASCAR Xfinity Series Champion; 2023 | Succeeded by Justin Allgaier |
