= 2023 HighPoint.com 400 =

NASCAR Cup Series race

Race details
- Race 21 of 36 in the 2023 NASCAR Cup Series
- Date: July 23, 2023
- Location: Pocono Raceway in Long Pond, Pennsylvania
- Course: Permanent racing facility
- Course length: 2.5 miles (4 km)
- Scheduled distance: 160 laps, 400 mi (640 km)
- Average speed: 119.363 miles per hour (192.096 km/h)

Pole position
Driver	William Byron	Hendrick Motorsports
- Time: 52.746

Most laps led
Driver	William Byron	Hendrick Motorsports
- Laps: 60

Winner
No. 11	Denny Hamlin	Joe Gibbs Racing

Television in the United States
- Network: USA
- Announcers: Rick Allen, Jeff Burton, Steve Letarte, and Dale Earnhardt Jr.

Radio in the United States
- Radio: MRN
- Booth announcers: Alex Hayden, Jeff Striegle, and Todd Gordon
- Turn announcers: Dave Moody (1), Mike Bagley (2) and Kyle Rickey (3)

The 2023 HighPoint.com 400 was a NASCAR Cup Series race held on July 23, 2023, at Pocono Raceway in Long Pond, Pennsylvania. Contested over 160 laps on the 2.5-mile (4.0 km) speedway, it was the 21st race of the 2023 NASCAR Cup Series season.

== Report ==
=== Background ===
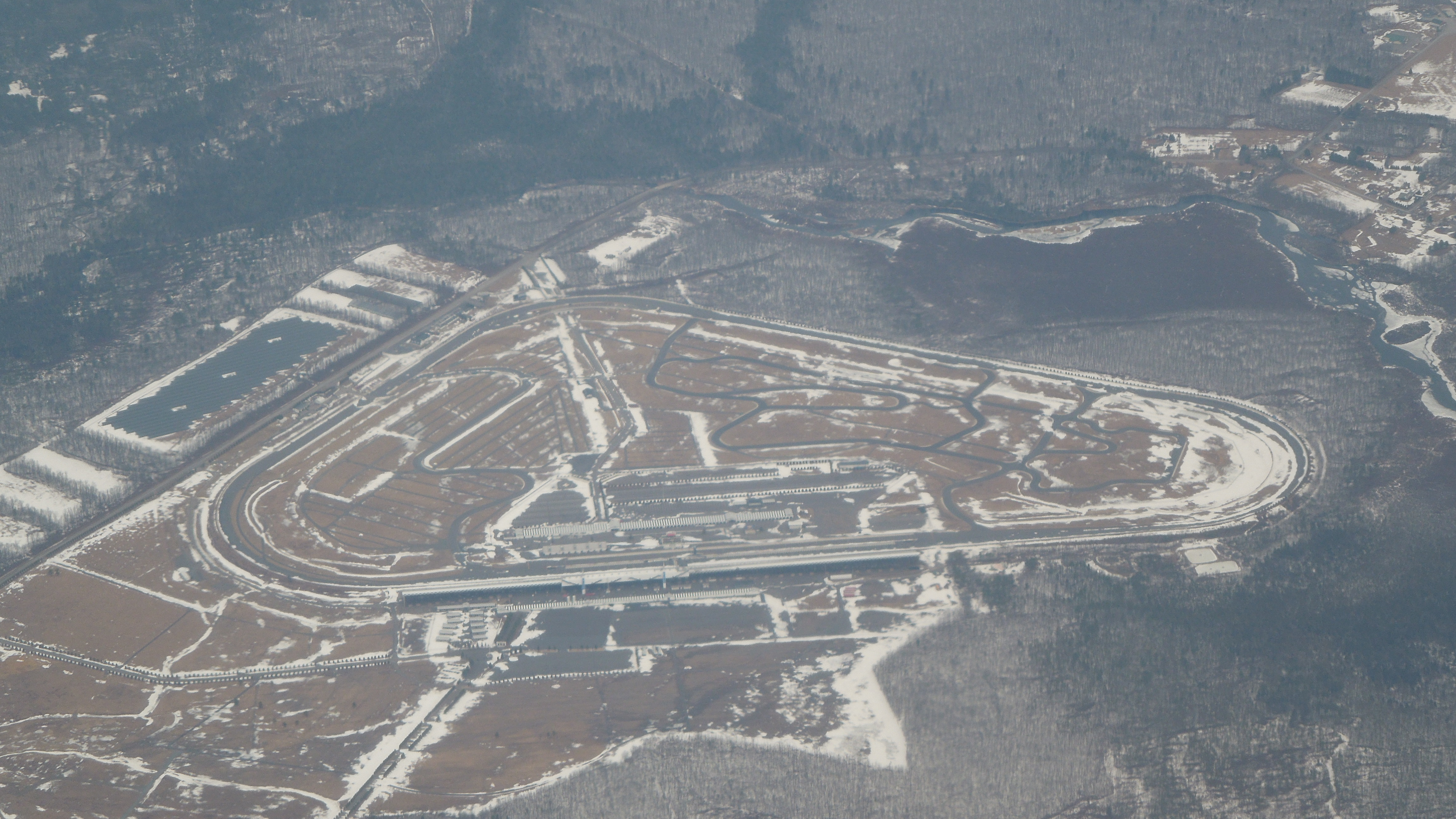
Pocono Raceway, the track where the race was held.

Pocono Raceway is a 2.5-mile (4.0 km) oval speedway located in Long Pond, Pennsylvania, which has hosted NASCAR racing annually since the early 1970s. Nicknamed "The Tricky Triangle", the speedway has three distinct corners and is known for high speeds along its lengthy straightaways.

From 1982 to 2019, the circuit had two race weekends. In 2020, the circuit was reduced to one race meeting of two races. The first race was moved to World Wide Technology Raceway near St. Louis starting in 2022.

==== Entry list ====
- (R) denotes rookie driver.
- (i) denotes the driver ineligible for series driver points.

No.	Driver	Team	Manufacturer
1	Ross Chastain	Trackhouse Racing	Chevrolet
2	Austin Cindric	Team Penske	Ford
3	Austin Dillon	Richard Childress Racing	Chevrolet
4	Kevin Harvick	Stewart-Haas Racing	Ford
5	Kyle Larson	Hendrick Motorsports	Chevrolet
6	Brad Keselowski	RFK Racing	Ford
7	Corey LaJoie	Spire Motorsports	Chevrolet
8	Kyle Busch	Richard Childress Racing	Chevrolet
9	Chase Elliott	Hendrick Motorsports	Chevrolet
10	Aric Almirola	Stewart-Haas Racing	Ford
11	Denny Hamlin	Joe Gibbs Racing	Toyota
12	Ryan Blaney	Team Penske	Ford
14	Chase Briscoe	Stewart-Haas Racing	Ford
15	J. J. Yeley (i)	Rick Ware Racing	Ford
16	A. J. Allmendinger	Kaulig Racing	Chevrolet
17	Chris Buescher	RFK Racing	Ford
19	Martin Truex Jr.	Joe Gibbs Racing	Toyota
20	Christopher Bell	Joe Gibbs Racing	Toyota
21	Harrison Burton	Wood Brothers Racing	Ford
22	Joey Logano	Team Penske	Ford
23	Bubba Wallace	23XI Racing	Toyota
24	William Byron	Hendrick Motorsports	Chevrolet
31	Justin Haley	Kaulig Racing	Chevrolet
34	Michael McDowell	Front Row Motorsports	Ford
38	Todd Gilliland	Front Row Motorsports	Ford
41	Ryan Preece	Stewart-Haas Racing	Ford
42	Noah Gragson (R)	Legacy Motor Club	Chevrolet
43	Erik Jones	Legacy Motor Club	Chevrolet
45	Tyler Reddick	23XI Racing	Toyota
47	Ricky Stenhouse Jr.	JTG Daugherty Racing	Chevrolet
48	Alex Bowman	Hendrick Motorsports	Chevrolet
51	Cole Custer (i)	Rick Ware Racing	Ford
54	Ty Gibbs (R)	Joe Gibbs Racing	Toyota
77	Ty Dillon	Spire Motorsports	Chevrolet
78	B. J. McLeod	Live Fast Motorsports	Chevrolet
99	Daniel Suárez	Trackhouse Racing	Chevrolet
Official entry list

== Practice ==
Tyler Reddick was the fastest in the practice session with a time of 53.382 seconds and a speed of 168.596 mph (271.329 km/h).

=== Practice results ===
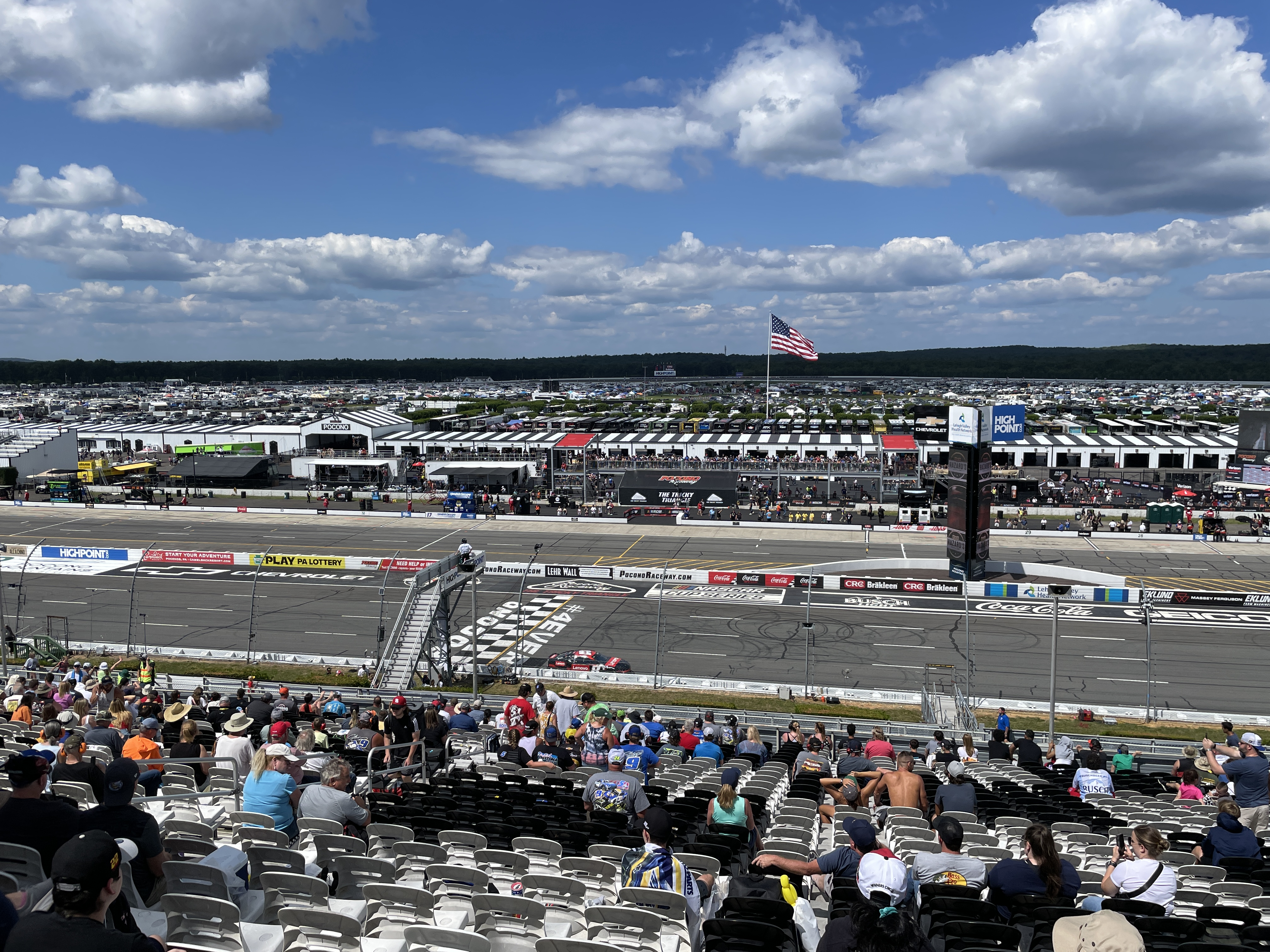
Practice for the race

Pos	No.	Driver	Team	Manufacturer	Time	Speed
1	45	Tyler Reddick	23XI Racing	Toyota	53.382	168.596
2	8	Kyle Busch	Richard Childress Racing	Chevrolet	53.418	168.483
3	24	William Byron	Hendrick Motorsports	Chevrolet	53.445	168.397
Official practice results

== Qualifying ==
William Byron scored the pole for the race with a time of 52.746 and a speed of 170.629 mph (274.601 km/h).

=== Qualifying results ===
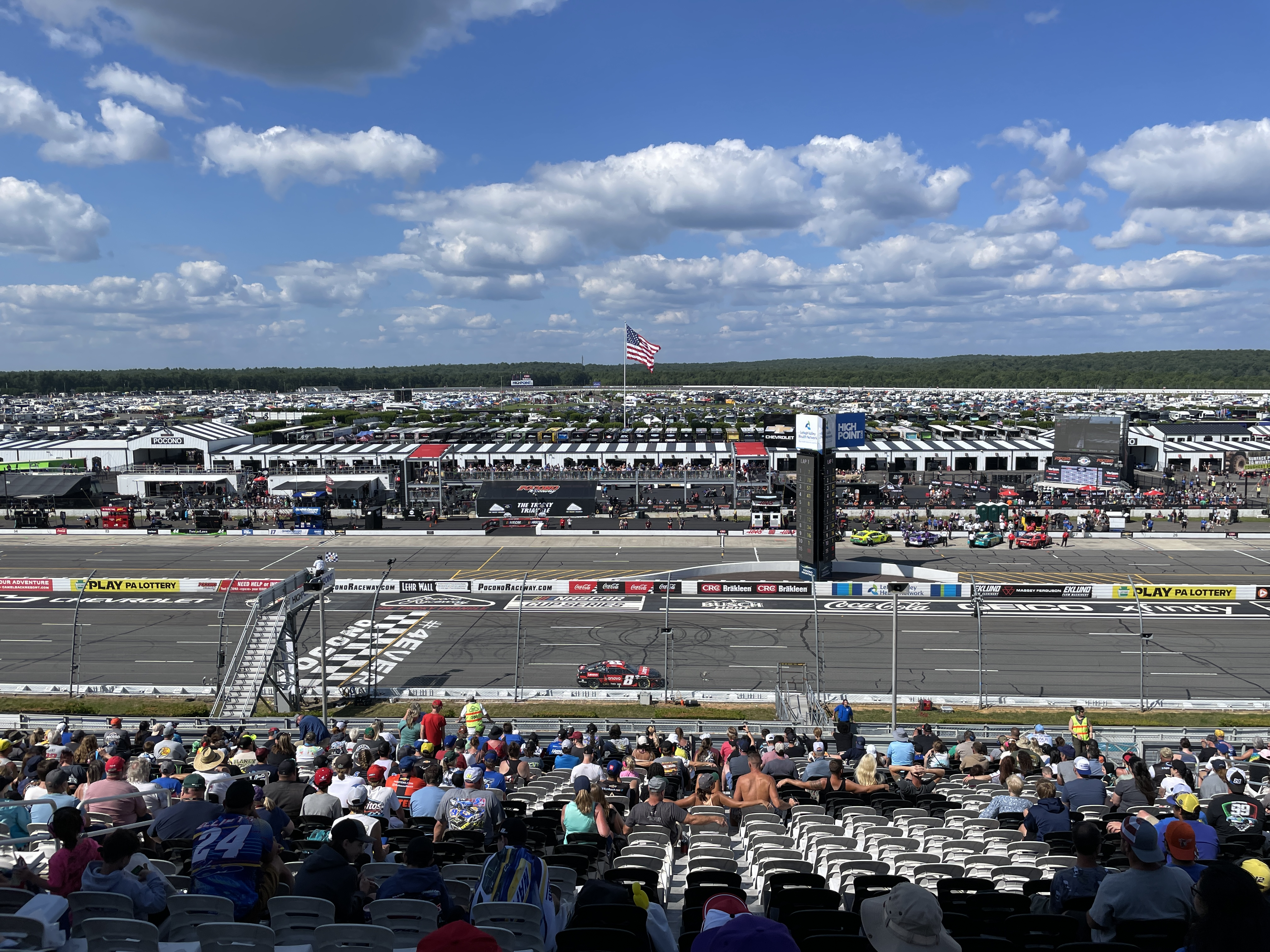
Qualifying for the race

Pos	No.	Driver	Team	Manufacturer	R1	R2
1	24	William Byron	Hendrick Motorsports	Chevrolet	52.865	52.746
2	19	Martin Truex Jr.	Joe Gibbs Racing	Toyota	52.962	52.868
3	5	Kyle Larson	Hendrick Motorsports	Chevrolet	53.014	52.918
4	4	Kevin Harvick	Stewart-Haas Racing	Ford	52.857	53.019
5	20	Christopher Bell	Joe Gibbs Racing	Toyota	53.085	53.052
6	22	Joey Logano	Team Penske	Ford	53.403	53.106
7	45	Tyler Reddick	23XI Racing	Toyota	52.804	53.141
8	11	Denny Hamlin	Joe Gibbs Racing	Toyota	53.023	53.106
9	2	Austin Cindric	Team Penske	Ford	53.293	53.410
10	23	Bubba Wallace	23XI Racing	Toyota	52.823	0.000
11	54	Ty Gibbs (R)	Joe Gibbs Racing	Toyota	53.150	—
12	7	Corey LaJoie	Spire Motorsports	Chevrolet	53.197	—
13	6	Brad Keselowski	RFK Racing	Ford	53.410	—
14	12	Ryan Blaney	Team Penske	Ford	53.425	—
15	34	Michael McDowell	Front Row Motorsports	Ford	53.524	—
16	16	A. J. Allmendinger	Kaulig Racing	Chevrolet	53.527	—
17	99	Daniel Suárez	Trackhouse Racing	Chevrolet	53.588	—
18	17	Chris Buescher	RFK Racing	Ford	53.691	—
19	31	Justin Haley	Kaulig Racing	Chevrolet	53.699	—
20	48	Alex Bowman	Hendrick Motorsports	Chevrolet	53.718	—
21	1	Ross Chastain	Trackhouse Racing	Chevrolet	53.754	—
22	47	Ricky Stenhouse Jr.	JTG Daugherty Racing	Chevrolet	53.777	—
23	3	Austin Dillon	Richard Childress Racing	Chevrolet	53.823	—
24	43	Erik Jones	Legacy Motor Club	Chevrolet	53.864	—
25	8	Kyle Busch	Richard Childress Racing	Chevrolet	53.873	—
26	21	Harrison Burton	Wood Brothers Racing	Ford	53.886	—
27	10	Aric Almirola	Stewart-Haas Racing	Ford	53.920	—
28	15	J. J. Yeley (i)	Rick Ware Racing	Ford	54.039	—
29	14	Chase Briscoe	Stewart-Haas Racing	Ford	54.224	—
30	78	B. J. McLeod	Live Fast Motorsports	Chevrolet	54.315	—
31	51	Cole Custer (i)	Rick Ware Racing	Ford	54.324	—
32	42	Noah Gragson (R)	Legacy Motor Club	Chevrolet	54.358	—
33	77	Ty Dillon	Spire Motorsports	Chevrolet	54.563	—
34	41	Ryan Preece	Stewart-Haas Racing	Ford	54.586	—
35	9	Chase Elliott	Hendrick Motorsports	Chevrolet	0.000	—
36	38	Todd Gilliland	Front Row Motorsports	Ford	0.000	—
Official qualifying results

== Race ==
=== Race results ===
==== Stage results ====
Stage One Laps: 30

Pos	No	Driver	Team	Manufacturer	Points
1	22	Joey Logano	Team Penske	Ford	10
2	19	Martin Truex Jr.	Joe Gibbs Racing	Toyota	9
3	11	Denny Hamlin	Joe Gibbs Racing	Toyota	8
4	45	Tyler Reddick	23XI Racing	Toyota	7
5	16	A. J. Allmendinger	Kaulig Racing	Chevrolet	6
6	34	Michael McDowell	Front Row Motorsports	Ford	5
7	23	Bubba Wallace	23XI Racing	Toyota	4
8	31	Justin Haley	Kaulig Racing	Chevrolet	3
9	17	Chris Buescher	RFK Racing	Ford	2
10	43	Erik Jones	Legacy Motor Club	Chevrolet	1
Official stage one results

Stage Two Laps: 65

Pos	No	Driver	Team	Manufacturer	Points
1	5	Kyle Larson	Hendrick Motorsports	Chevrolet	10
2	77	Ty Dillon	Spire Motorsports	Chevrolet	9
3	24	William Byron	Hendrick Motorsports	Chevrolet	8
4	11	Denny Hamlin	Joe Gibbs Racing	Toyota	7
5	48	Alex Bowman	Hendrick Motorsports	Chevrolet	6
6	45	Tyler Reddick	23XI Racing	Toyota	5
7	54	Ty Gibbs (R)	Joe Gibbs Racing	Toyota	4
8	12	Ryan Blaney	Team Penske	Ford	3
9	23	Bubba Wallace	23XI Racing	Toyota	2
10	19	Martin Truex Jr.	Joe Gibbs Racing	Toyota	1
Official stage two results

=== Final Stage results ===
Stage Three Laps: 65

Pos	Grid	No	Driver	Team	Manufacturer	Laps	Points
1	8	11	Denny Hamlin	Joe Gibbs Racing	Toyota	160	55
2	7	45	Tyler Reddick	23XI Racing	Toyota	160	47
3	2	19	Martin Truex Jr.	Joe Gibbs Racing	Toyota	160	44
4	4	4	Kevin Harvick	Stewart-Haas Racing	Ford	160	33
5	11	54	Ty Gibbs (R)	Joe Gibbs Racing	Toyota	160	36
6	5	20	Christopher Bell	Joe Gibbs Racing	Toyota	160	31
7	22	47	Ricky Stenhouse Jr.	JTG Daugherty Racing	Chevrolet	160	30
8	26	21	Harrison Burton	Wood Brothers Racing	Ford	160	29
9	24	43	Erik Jones	Legacy Motor Club	Chevrolet	160	29
10	35	9	Chase Elliott	Hendrick Motorsports	Chevrolet	160	27
11	10	23	Bubba Wallace	23XI Racing	Toyota	160	32
12	27	10	Aric Almirola	Stewart-Haas Racing	Ford	160	25
13	21	1	Ross Chastain	Trackhouse Racing	Chevrolet	160	24
14	1	24	William Byron	Hendrick Motorsports	Chevrolet	160	31
15	36	38	Todd Gilliland	Front Row Motorsports	Ford	160	22
16	13	6	Brad Keselowski	RFK Racing	Ford	160	21
17	16	16	A. J. Allmendinger	Kaulig Racing	Chevrolet	160	26
18	18	17	Chris Buescher	RFK Racing	Ford	160	21
19	15	34	Michael McDowell	Front Row Motorsports	Ford	160	23
20	3	5	Kyle Larson	Hendrick Motorsports	Chevrolet	160	27
21	25	8	Kyle Busch	Richard Childress Racing	Chevrolet	160	16
22	32	42	Noah Gragson (R)	Legacy Motor Club	Chevrolet	160	15
23	9	2	Austin Cindric	Team Penske	Ford	160	14
24	20	48	Alex Bowman	Hendrick Motorsports	Chevrolet	160	19
25	31	51	Cole Custer (i)	Rick Ware Racing	Ford	160	0
26	28	15	J. J. Yeley (i)	Rick Ware Racing	Ford	160	0
27	12	7	Corey LaJoie	Spire Motorsports	Chevrolet	160	10
28	33	77	Ty Dillon	Spire Motorsports	Chevrolet	160	18
29	29	14	Chase Briscoe	Stewart-Haas Racing	Ford	160	8
30	14	12	Ryan Blaney	Team Penske	Ford	160	10
31	34	41	Ryan Preece	Stewart-Haas Racing	Ford	159	6
32	30	78	B. J. McLeod	Live Fast Motorsports	Chevrolet	159	5
33	19	31	Justin Haley	Kaulig Racing	Chevrolet	153	7
34	23	3	Austin Dillon	Richard Childress Racing	Chevrolet	105	3
35	6	22	Joey Logano	Team Penske	Ford	48	12
36	17	99	Daniel Suárez	Trackhouse Racing	Chevrolet	37	1
Official race results

=== Race statistics ===
- Lead changes: 14 among 9 different drivers
- Cautions/Laps: 11 for 44 laps
- Red flags: 0
- Time of race: 3 hours, 21 minutes, and 4 seconds
- Average speed: 119.363 miles per hour (192.096 km/h)

== Media ==
=== Television ===
USA covered the race on the television side. Rick Allen, Jeff Burton, Steve Letarte, and Dale Earnhardt Jr. called the race from the broadcast booth. Kim Coon, Parker Kligerman and Marty Snider handled the pit road duties from pit lane.

USA
Booth announcers	Pit reporters
Lap-by-lap: Rick Allen; Color-commentator: Jeff Burton; Color-commentator: Steve Letarte; Color-commentator: Dale Earnhardt Jr.	Kim Coon; Parker Kligerman; Marty Snider

=== Radio ===
Radio coverage of the race was broadcast by Motor Racing Network (MRN) and was also simulcast on Sirius XM NASCAR Radio. Alex Hayden, Jeff Striegle, and Todd Gordon called the race in the booth when the field raced through the tri-oval. Dave Moody called the race from the Sunoco spotters stand outside turn 2 when the field raced through turns 1 and 2. Mike Bagley called the race from a platform inside the backstretch when the field raced down the backstretch. Kyle Rickey called the race from the Sunoco spotters stand outside turn 3. Steve Post, Brienne Pedigo, and Jason Toy worked pit road for MRN.

MRN Radio
Booth announcers	Turn announcers	Pit reporters
Lead announcer: Alex Hayden; Announcer: Jeff Striegle; Announcer: Todd Gordon	Turns 1 & 2: Dave Moody; Backstretch: Mike Bagley; Turn 3: Kyle Rickey	Steve Post; Brienne Pedigo; Jason Toy

== Standings after the race ==
Drivers' Championship standings

	Pos	Driver	Points
	1	Martin Truex Jr.	711
	2	William Byron	681 (–30)
1	3	Denny Hamlin	656 (–55)
1	4	Christopher Bell	636 (–75)
1	5	Ross Chastain	613 (–98)
1	6	Kyle Busch	608 (–103)
1	7	Kyle Larson	601 (–110)
1	8	Kevin Harvick	601 (–110)
2	9	Ryan Blaney	591 (–120)
	10	Joey Logano	575 (–136)
2	11	Tyler Reddick	563 (–148)
1	12	Brad Keselowski	560 (–151)
1	13	Chris Buescher	549 (–162)
	14	Ricky Stenhouse Jr.	494 (–217)
	15	Bubba Wallace	465 (–246)
	16	Michael McDowell	455 (–256)
Official driver's standings

Manufacturers' Championship standings

Pos	Manufacturer	Points
1	Chevrolet	786
2	Toyota	729 (–57)
3	Ford	704 (–82)

- Note: Only the first 16 positions are included for the driver standings.
- . – Driver has clinched a position in the NASCAR Cup Series playoffs.

Previous race: 2023 Crayon 301	NASCAR Cup Series; 2023 season	Next race: 2023 Cook Out 400
