= 2023 Crayon 301 =

NASCAR Cup Series race

Race details
- Race 20 of 36 in the 2023 NASCAR Cup Series
- Date: July 17, 2023
- Location: New Hampshire Motor Speedway in Loudon, New Hampshire
- Course: Permanent racing facility
- Course length: 1.058 miles (1.703 km)
- Distance: 301 laps, 318.458 mi (512.603 km)
- Average speed: 101.572 miles per hour (163.464 km/h)

Pole position
| Driver | Christopher Bell | Joe Gibbs Racing |
- Time: 30.524

Most laps led
| Driver | Martin Truex Jr. | Joe Gibbs Racing |
- Laps: 254

Winner
| No. 19 | Martin Truex Jr. | Joe Gibbs Racing |

Television in the United States
- Network: USA
- Announcers: Rick Allen, Jeff Burton, Steve Letarte, and Dale Earnhardt Jr.

Radio in the United States
- Radio: PRN
- Booth announcers: Doug Rice and Mark Garrow
- Turn announcers: Rob Albright (1 & 2) and Pat Patterson (3 & 4)

The 2023 Crayon 301 was a NASCAR Cup Series race held on July 17, 2023, at New Hampshire Motor Speedway in Loudon, New Hampshire. Contested over 301 laps on the 1.058-mile (1.703 km) speedway, it was the 20th race of the 2023 NASCAR Cup Series season. The race was postponed from Sunday, July 16 to Monday, July 17, due to rain. Martin Truex Jr. won the race, scoring his 34th and final Cup Series victory as a full time Cup Series driver.

== Report ==
=== Background ===
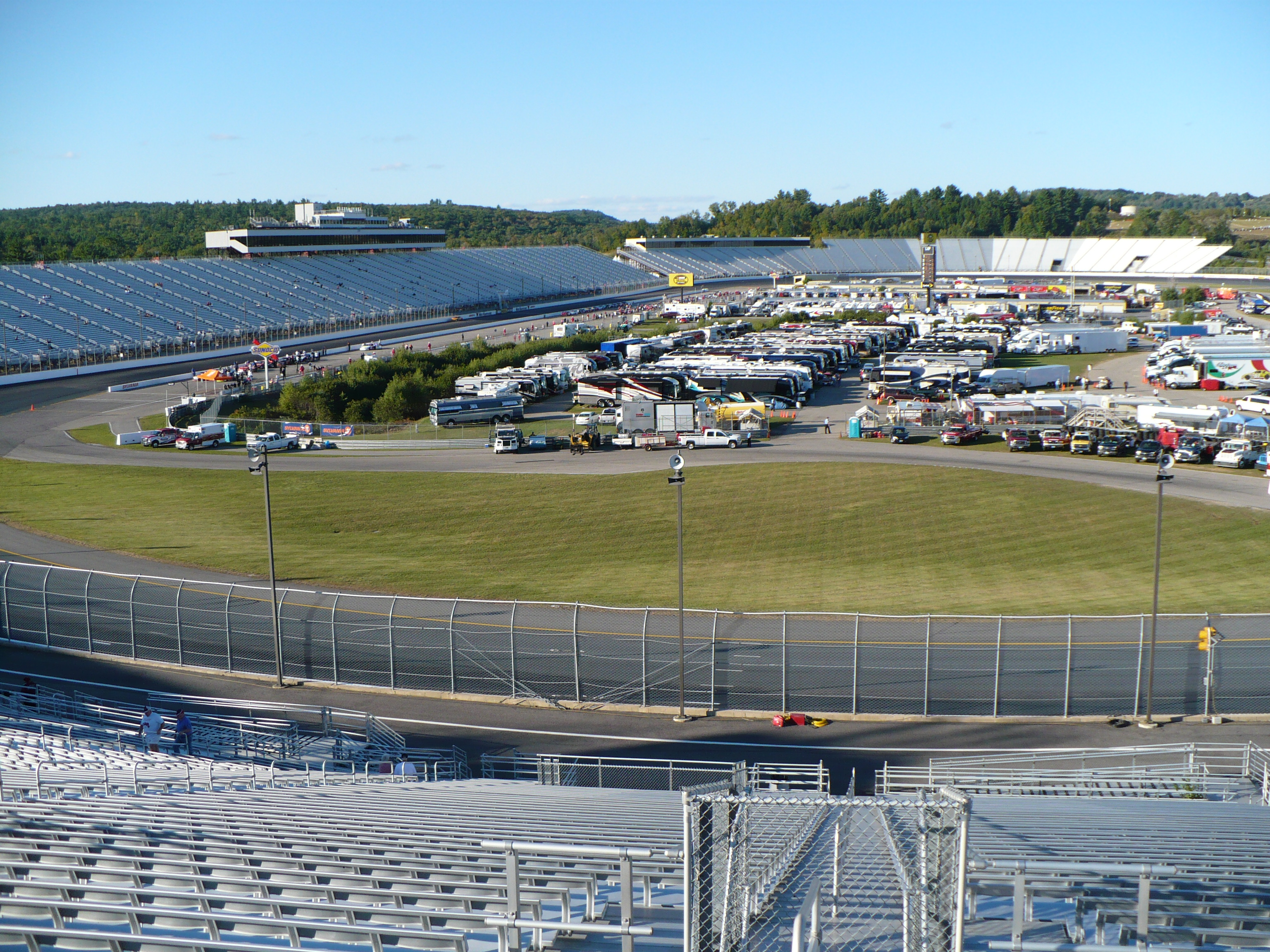
New Hampshire Motor Speedway, the track where the race was held.

New Hampshire Motor Speedway is a 1.058-mile (1.703 km) oval speedway located in Loudon, New Hampshire, which has hosted NASCAR racing annually since the early 1990s, as well as the longest-running motorcycle race in North America, the Loudon Classic. Nicknamed "The Magic Mile", the speedway is often converted into a 1.6-mile (2.6 km) road course, which includes much of the oval.

The track was originally the site of Bryar Motorsports Park before being purchased and redeveloped by Bob Bahre. The track is currently one of eight major NASCAR tracks owned and operated by Speedway Motorsports.

==== Entry list ====
- (R) denotes rookie driver.
- (i) denotes the driver ineligible for series driver points.

| No. | Driver | Team | Manufacturer |
|---|---|---|---|
| 1 | Ross Chastain | Trackhouse Racing | Chevrolet |
| 2 | Austin Cindric | Team Penske | Ford |
| 3 | Austin Dillon | Richard Childress Racing | Chevrolet |
| 4 | Kevin Harvick | Stewart-Haas Racing | Ford |
| 5 | Kyle Larson | Hendrick Motorsports | Chevrolet |
| 6 | Brad Keselowski | RFK Racing | Ford |
| 7 | Corey LaJoie | Spire Motorsports | Chevrolet |
| 8 | Kyle Busch | Richard Childress Racing | Chevrolet |
| 9 | Chase Elliott | Hendrick Motorsports | Chevrolet |
| 10 | Aric Almirola | Stewart-Haas Racing | Ford |
| 11 | Denny Hamlin | Joe Gibbs Racing | Toyota |
| 12 | Ryan Blaney | Team Penske | Ford |
| 14 | Chase Briscoe | Stewart-Haas Racing | Ford |
| 15 | Ryan Newman | Rick Ware Racing | Ford |
| 16 | A. J. Allmendinger | Kaulig Racing | Chevrolet |
| 17 | Chris Buescher | RFK Racing | Ford |
| 19 | Martin Truex Jr. | Joe Gibbs Racing | Toyota |
| 20 | Christopher Bell | Joe Gibbs Racing | Toyota |
| 21 | Harrison Burton | Wood Brothers Racing | Ford |
| 22 | Joey Logano | Team Penske | Ford |
| 23 | Bubba Wallace | 23XI Racing | Toyota |
| 24 | William Byron | Hendrick Motorsports | Chevrolet |
| 31 | Justin Haley | Kaulig Racing | Chevrolet |
| 34 | Michael McDowell | Front Row Motorsports | Ford |
| 38 | Todd Gilliland | Front Row Motorsports | Ford |
| 41 | Ryan Preece | Stewart-Haas Racing | Ford |
| 42 | Noah Gragson (R) | Legacy Motor Club | Chevrolet |
| 43 | Erik Jones | Legacy Motor Club | Chevrolet |
| 45 | Tyler Reddick | 23XI Racing | Toyota |
| 47 | Ricky Stenhouse Jr. | JTG Daugherty Racing | Chevrolet |
| 48 | Alex Bowman | Hendrick Motorsports | Chevrolet |
| 51 | Cole Custer (i) | Rick Ware Racing | Ford |
| 54 | Ty Gibbs (R) | Joe Gibbs Racing | Toyota |
| 77 | Ty Dillon | Spire Motorsports | Chevrolet |
| 78 | B. J. McLeod | Live Fast Motorsports | Chevrolet |
| 99 | Daniel Suárez | Trackhouse Racing | Chevrolet |
Official entry list

== Practice ==
Michael McDowell was the fastest in the practice session with a time of 30.129 seconds and a speed of 126.416 mph (203.447 km/h).

=== Practice results ===
| Pos | No. | Driver | Team | Manufacturer | Time | Speed |
|---|---|---|---|---|---|---|
| 1 | 34 | Michael McDowell | Front Row Motorsports | Ford | 30.129 | 126.416 |
| 2 | 19 | Martin Truex Jr. | Joe Gibbs Racing | Toyota | 30.131 | 126.408 |
| 3 | 1 | Ross Chastain | Trackhouse Racing | Chevrolet | 30.210 | 126.077 |
Official practice results

== Qualifying ==
Christopher Bell scored the pole for the race with a time of 30.524 and a speed of 124.781 mph (200.816 km/h).

=== Qualifying results ===
| Pos | No. | Driver | Team | Manufacturer | R1 | R2 |
|---|---|---|---|---|---|---|
| 1 | 20 | Christopher Bell | Joe Gibbs Racing | Toyota | 30.425 | 30.524 |
| 2 | 19 | Martin Truex Jr. | Joe Gibbs Racing | Toyota | 30.375 | 30.531 |
| 3 | 10 | Aric Almirola | Stewart-Haas Racing | Ford | 30.423 | 30.542 |
| 4 | 22 | Joey Logano | Team Penske | Ford | 30.318 | 30.571 |
| 5 | 12 | Ryan Blaney | Team Penske | Ford | 30.468 | 30.635 |
| 6 | 45 | Tyler Reddick | 23XI Racing | Toyota | 30.572 | 30.640 |
| 7 | 24 | William Byron | Hendrick Motorsports | Chevrolet | 30.465 | 30.742 |
| 8 | 23 | Bubba Wallace | 23XI Racing | Toyota | 30.566 | 30.748 |
| 9 | 6 | Brad Keselowski | RFK Racing | Ford | 30.533 | 30.752 |
| 10 | 8 | Kyle Busch | Richard Childress Racing | Chevrolet | 30.586 | 0.000 |
| 11 | 3 | Austin Dillon | Richard Childress Racing | Chevrolet | 30.474 | — |
| 12 | 99 | Daniel Suárez | Trackhouse Racing | Chevrolet | 30.596 | — |
| 13 | 4 | Kevin Harvick | Stewart-Haas Racing | Ford | 30.598 | — |
| 14 | 16 | A. J. Allmendinger | Kaulig Racing | Chevrolet | 30.629 | — |
| 15 | 5 | Kyle Larson | Hendrick Motorsports | Chevrolet | 30.638 | — |
| 16 | 47 | Ricky Stenhouse Jr. | JTG Daugherty Racing | Chevrolet | 30.653 | — |
| 17 | 34 | Michael McDowell | Front Row Motorsports | Ford | 30.665 | — |
| 18 | 9 | Chase Elliott | Hendrick Motorsports | Chevrolet | 30.666 | — |
| 19 | 31 | Justin Haley | Kaulig Racing | Chevrolet | 30.667 | — |
| 20 | 11 | Denny Hamlin | Joe Gibbs Racing | Toyota | 30.689 | — |
| 21 | 41 | Ryan Preece | Stewart-Haas Racing | Ford | 30.709 | — |
| 22 | 2 | Austin Cindric | Team Penske | Ford | 30.726 | — |
| 23 | 38 | Todd Gilliland | Front Row Motorsports | Ford | 30.754 | — |
| 24 | 7 | Corey LaJoie | Spire Motorsports | Chevrolet | 30.761 | — |
| 25 | 48 | Alex Bowman | Hendrick Motorsports | Chevrolet | 30.780 | — |
| 26 | 17 | Chris Buescher | RFK Racing | Ford | 30.786 | — |
| 27 | 14 | Chase Briscoe | Stewart-Haas Racing | Ford | 30.824 | — |
| 28 | 21 | Harrison Burton | Wood Brothers Racing | Ford | 30.927 | — |
| 29 | 42 | Noah Gragson (R) | Legacy Motor Club | Chevrolet | 30.931 | — |
| 30 | 43 | Erik Jones | Legacy Motor Club | Chevrolet | 30.953 | — |
| 31 | 1 | Ross Chastain | Trackhouse Racing | Chevrolet | 30.955 | — |
| 32 | 78 | B. J. McLeod | Live Fast Motorsports | Chevrolet | 31.073 | — |
| 33 | 15 | Ryan Newman | Rick Ware Racing | Ford | 31.087 | — |
| 34 | 51 | Cole Custer (i) | Rick Ware Racing | Ford | 31.163 | — |
| 35 | 77 | Ty Dillon | Spire Motorsports | Chevrolet | 31.219 | — |
| 36 | 54 | Ty Gibbs (R) | Joe Gibbs Racing | Toyota | 31.408 | — |
Official qualifying results

== Race ==
=== Race results ===
==== Stage results ====
Stage One Laps: 70

| Pos | No | Driver | Team | Manufacturer | Points |
|---|---|---|---|---|---|
| 1 | 19 | Martin Truex Jr. | Joe Gibbs Racing | Toyota | 10 |
| 2 | 24 | William Byron | Hendrick Motorsports | Chevrolet | 9 |
| 3 | 45 | Tyler Reddick | 23XI Racing | Toyota | 8 |
| 4 | 10 | Aric Almirola | Stewart-Haas Racing | Ford | 7 |
| 5 | 12 | Ryan Blaney | Team Penske | Ford | 6 |
| 6 | 20 | Christopher Bell | Joe Gibbs Racing | Toyota | 5 |
| 7 | 11 | Denny Hamlin | Joe Gibbs Racing | Toyota | 4 |
| 8 | 99 | Daniel Suárez | Trackhouse Racing | Chevrolet | 3 |
| 9 | 22 | Joey Logano | Team Penske | Ford | 2 |
| 10 | 34 | Michael McDowell | Front Row Motorsports | Ford | 1 |
Official stage one results

Stage Two Laps: 115

| Pos | No | Driver | Team | Manufacturer | Points |
|---|---|---|---|---|---|
| 1 | 19 | Martin Truex Jr. | Joe Gibbs Racing | Toyota | 10 |
| 2 | 5 | Kyle Larson | Hendrick Motorsports | Chevrolet | 9 |
| 3 | 22 | Joey Logano | Team Penske | Ford | 8 |
| 4 | 12 | Ryan Blaney | Team Penske | Ford | 7 |
| 5 | 11 | Denny Hamlin | Joe Gibbs Racing | Toyota | 6 |
| 6 | 4 | Kevin Harvick | Stewart-Haas Racing | Ford | 5 |
| 7 | 48 | Alex Bowman | Hendrick Motorsports | Chevrolet | 4 |
| 8 | 6 | Brad Keselowski | RFK Racing | Ford | 3 |
| 9 | 45 | Tyler Reddick | 23XI Racing | Toyota | 2 |
| 10 | 20 | Christopher Bell | Joe Gibbs Racing | Toyota | 1 |
Official stage two results

=== Final Stage results ===
Stage Three Laps: 116

| Pos | Grid | No | Driver | Team | Manufacturer | Laps | Points |
|---|---|---|---|---|---|---|---|
| 1 | 2 | 19 | Martin Truex Jr. | Joe Gibbs Racing | Toyota | 301 | 60 |
| 2 | 4 | 22 | Joey Logano | Team Penske | Ford | 301 | 45 |
| 3 | 15 | 5 | Kyle Larson | Hendrick Motorsports | Chevrolet | 301 | 43 |
| 4 | 13 | 4 | Kevin Harvick | Stewart-Haas Racing | Ford | 301 | 38 |
| 5 | 9 | 6 | Brad Keselowski | RFK Racing | Ford | 301 | 35 |
| 6 | 6 | 45 | Tyler Reddick | 23XI Racing | Toyota | 301 | 41 |
| 7 | 20 | 11 | Denny Hamlin | Joe Gibbs Racing | Toyota | 301 | 40 |
| 8 | 8 | 23 | Bubba Wallace | 23XI Racing | Toyota | 301 | 29 |
| 9 | 11 | 3 | Austin Dillon | Richard Childress Racing | Chevrolet | 301 | 28 |
| 10 | 27 | 14 | Chase Briscoe | Stewart-Haas Racing | Ford | 301 | 27 |
| 11 | 30 | 43 | Erik Jones | Legacy Motor Club | Chevrolet | 301 | 26 |
| 12 | 18 | 9 | Chase Elliott | Hendrick Motorsports | Chevrolet | 301 | 25 |
| 13 | 17 | 34 | Michael McDowell | Front Row Motorsports | Ford | 301 | 25 |
| 14 | 25 | 48 | Alex Bowman | Hendrick Motorsports | Chevrolet | 301 | 27 |
| 15 | 26 | 17 | Chris Buescher | RFK Racing | Ford | 301 | 22 |
| 16 | 12 | 99 | Daniel Suárez | Trackhouse Racing | Chevrolet | 301 | 24 |
| 17 | 19 | 31 | Justin Haley | Kaulig Racing | Chevrolet | 301 | 20 |
| 18 | 16 | 47 | Ricky Stenhouse Jr. | JTG Daugherty Racing | Chevrolet | 301 | 19 |
| 19 | 14 | 16 | A. J. Allmendinger | Kaulig Racing | Chevrolet | 301 | 18 |
| 20 | 28 | 21 | Harrison Burton | Wood Brothers Racing | Ford | 301 | 17 |
| 21 | 23 | 38 | Todd Gilliland | Front Row Motorsports | Ford | 301 | 16 |
| 22 | 5 | 12 | Ryan Blaney | Team Penske | Ford | 301 | 28 |
| 23 | 31 | 1 | Ross Chastain | Trackhouse Racing | Chevrolet | 301 | 14 |
| 24 | 7 | 24 | William Byron | Hendrick Motorsports | Chevrolet | 301 | 22 |
| 25 | 22 | 2 | Austin Cindric | Team Penske | Ford | 301 | 12 |
| 26 | 35 | 77 | Ty Dillon | Spire Motorsports | Chevrolet | 301 | 11 |
| 27 | 36 | 54 | Ty Gibbs (R) | Joe Gibbs Racing | Toyota | 301 | 10 |
| 28 | 21 | 41 | Ryan Preece | Stewart-Haas Racing | Ford | 300 | 9 |
| 29 | 1 | 20 | Christopher Bell | Joe Gibbs Racing | Toyota | 299 | 14 |
| 30 | 33 | 15 | Ryan Newman | Rick Ware Racing | Ford | 299 | 7 |
| 31 | 32 | 78 | B. J. McLeod | Live Fast Motorsports | Chevrolet | 295 | 6 |
| 32 | 29 | 42 | Noah Gragson (R) | Legacy Motor Club | Chevrolet | 268 | 5 |
| 33 | 24 | 7 | Corey LaJoie | Spire Motorsports | Chevrolet | 176 | 4 |
| 34 | 3 | 10 | Aric Almirola | Stewart-Haas Racing | Ford | 168 | 10 |
| 35 | 34 | 51 | Cole Custer (i) | Rick Ware Racing | Ford | 130 | 0 |
| 36 | 10 | 8 | Kyle Busch | Richard Childress Racing | Chevrolet | 71 | 1 |
Official race results

=== Race statistics ===
- Lead changes: 13 among 9 different drivers
- Cautions/Laps: 8 for 41 laps
- Red flags: 0
- Time of race: 3 hours, 8 minutes, and 7 seconds
- Average speed: 101.572 miles per hour (163.464 km/h)

== Media ==
=== Television ===
USA covered the race on the television side. Rick Allen, four-time and all-time Loudon winner Jeff Burton, Steve Letarte, and Dale Earnhardt Jr. called the race from the broadcast booth. Dave Burns, Kim Coon and Marty Snider handled the pit road duties from pit lane.

USA
| Booth announcers | Pit reporters |
|---|---|
| Lap-by-lap: Rick Allen; Color-commentator: Jeff Burton; Color-commentator: Steve Letarte; Color-commentator: Dale Earnhardt Jr. | Dave Burns; Kim Coon; Marty Snider |

=== Radio ===
PRN had the radio call for the race, which was also simulcast on Sirius XM NASCAR Radio. Doug Rice and Mark Garrow called the race from the booth when the field races down the frontstretch. Rob Albright called the race from turns 1 & 2 and Pat Patterson called the race from turns 3 & 4. Brad Gillie, Brett McMillan and Wendy Venturini handled the duties on pit lane.

PRN
| Booth announcers | Turn announcers | Pit reporters |
|---|---|---|
| Lead announcer: Doug Rice; Announcer: Mark Garrow | Turns 1 & 2: Rob Albright; Turns 3 & 4: Pat Patterson | Brad Gillie; Brett McMillan; Wendy Venturini |

== Standings after the race ==
Drivers' Championship standings

| | Pos | Driver | Points |
|---|---|---|---|
| 1 | 1 | Martin Truex Jr. | 667 |
| 1 | 2 | William Byron | 650 (–17) |
| 1 | 3 | Christopher Bell | 605 (–62) |
| 2 | 4 | Denny Hamlin | 601 (–66) |
| 2 | 5 | Kyle Busch | 593 (–74) |
| 1 | 6 | Ross Chastain | 589 (–78) |
| | 7 | Ryan Blaney | 581 (–86) |
| | 8 | Kyle Larson | 574 (–93) |
| | 9 | Kevin Harvick | 568 (–99) |
| | 10 | Joey Logano | 563 (–104) |
| 1 | 11 | Brad Keselowski | 539 (–128) |
| 1 | 12 | Chris Buescher | 528 (–139) |
| | 13 | Tyler Reddick | 516 (–151) |
| | 14 | Ricky Stenhouse Jr. | 464 (–203) |
| 2 | 15 | Bubba Wallace | 433 (–234) |
| | 16 | Michael McDowell | 432 (–235) |
Official driver's standings

Manufacturers' Championship standings

| Pos | Manufacturer | Points |
|---|---|---|
| 1 | Chevrolet | 756 |
| 2 | Toyota | 689 (–67) |
| 3 | Ford | 671 (–85) |

- Note: Only the first 16 positions are included for the driver standings.
- . – Driver has clinched a position in the NASCAR Cup Series playoffs.

| Previous race: 2023 Quaker State 400 | NASCAR Cup Series; 2023 season | Next race: 2023 HighPoint.com 400 |
