= 2023 Cook Out 400 =

NASCAR Cup Series race

Race details
- Race 22 of 36 in the 2023 NASCAR Cup Series
- Date: July 30, 2023
- Location: Richmond Raceway in Richmond, Virginia
- Course: Permanent racing facility
- Course length: .75 miles (1.2 km)
- Distance: 400 laps, 300 mi (480 km)
- Average speed: 98.783 miles per hour (158.976 km/h)

Pole position
Driver	Tyler Reddick	23XI Racing
- Time: 23.749

Most laps led
Driver	Brad Keselowski	RFK Racing
- Laps: 102

Winner
No. 17	Chris Buescher	RFK Racing

Television in the United States
- Network: USA
- Announcers: Rick Allen, Jeff Burton, Steve Letarte, and Dale Earnhardt Jr.

Radio in the United States
- Radio: MRN
- Booth announcers: Alex Hayden, Jeff Striegle, and Todd Gordon
- Turn announcers: Dave Moody (Backstretch)

The 2023 Cook Out 400 was a NASCAR Cup Series race held on July 30, 2023, at Richmond Raceway in Richmond, Virginia. Contested over 400 laps on the .75-mile (1.21 km) D-shaped short track, it was the 22nd race of the 2023 NASCAR Cup Series season. The Cook Out 400 was event 3/3 of the NASCAR Cup Series at Richmond Raceway, and was conclusive in the race weekend.

== Report ==
=== Background ===
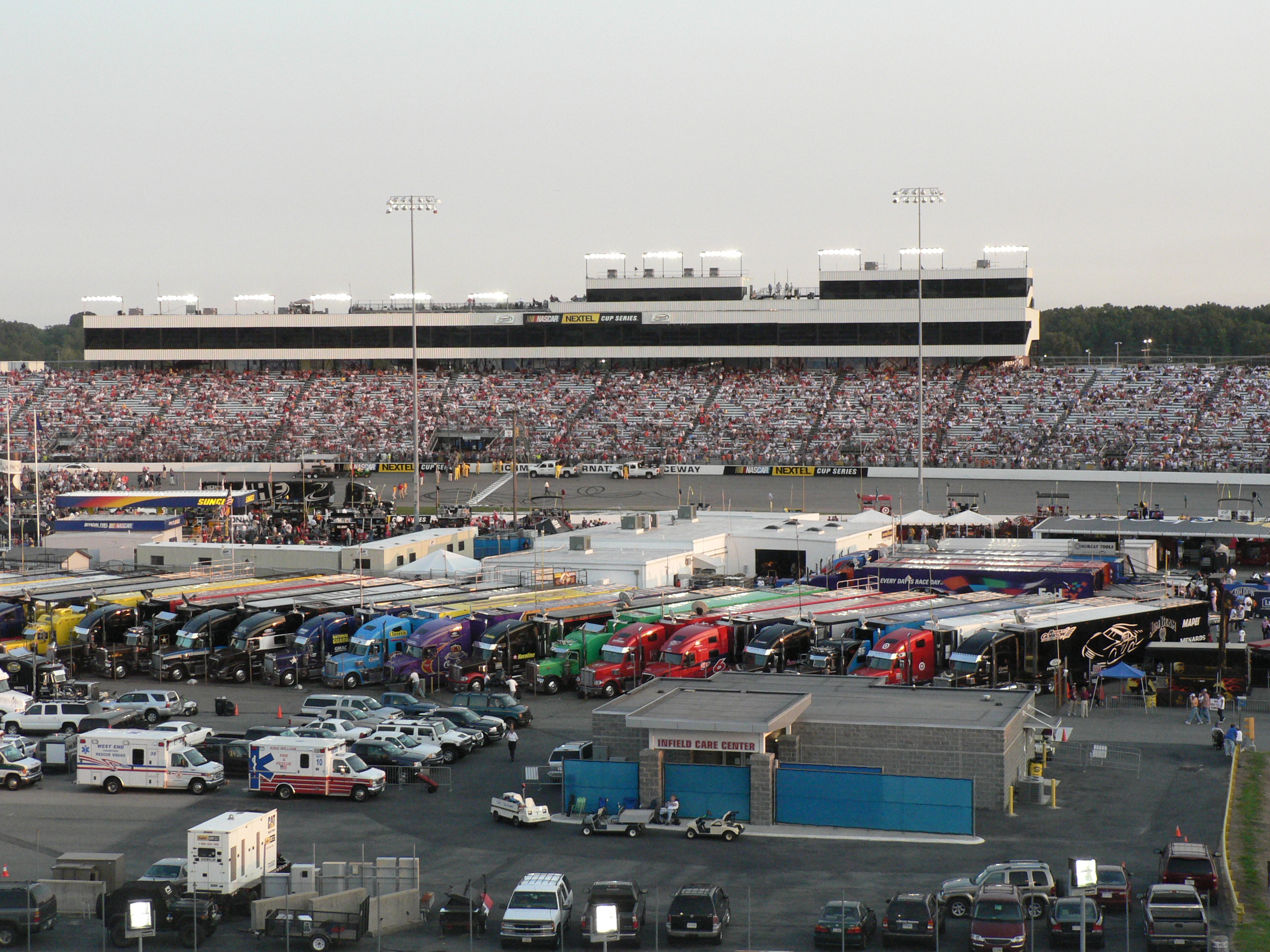
Richmond Raceway, the track where the race was held.

Richmond Raceway (RR), formerly known as Richmond International Raceway (RIR), is a 3/4-mile (1.2 km), D-shaped, asphalt race track located just outside Richmond, Virginia, in Henrico County. It hosts the NASCAR Cup Series, the NASCAR Xfinity Series, NASCAR Craftsman Truck Series and the IndyCar series. Known as "America's premier short track", it formerly hosted two USAC sprint car races.

==== Entry list ====
- (R) denotes rookie driver.
- (i) denotes the driver ineligible for series driver points.

No.	Driver	Team	Manufacturer
1	Ross Chastain	Trackhouse Racing	Chevrolet
2	Austin Cindric	Team Penske	Ford
3	Austin Dillon	Richard Childress Racing	Chevrolet
4	Kevin Harvick	Stewart-Haas Racing	Ford
5	Kyle Larson	Hendrick Motorsports	Chevrolet
6	Brad Keselowski	RFK Racing	Ford
7	Corey LaJoie	Spire Motorsports	Chevrolet
8	Kyle Busch	Richard Childress Racing	Chevrolet
9	Chase Elliott	Hendrick Motorsports	Chevrolet
10	Aric Almirola	Stewart-Haas Racing	Ford
11	Denny Hamlin	Joe Gibbs Racing	Toyota
12	Ryan Blaney	Team Penske	Ford
14	Chase Briscoe	Stewart-Haas Racing	Ford
15	J. J. Yeley (i)	Rick Ware Racing	Ford
16	A. J. Allmendinger (Note: Derek Kraus practiced and qualified the No. 16 for A. J. Allmendinger, who was in Elkhart Lake for the Xfinity race.)	Kaulig Racing	Chevrolet
17	Chris Buescher	RFK Racing	Ford
19	Martin Truex Jr.	Joe Gibbs Racing	Toyota
20	Christopher Bell	Joe Gibbs Racing	Toyota
21	Harrison Burton	Wood Brothers Racing	Ford
22	Joey Logano	Team Penske	Ford
23	Bubba Wallace	23XI Racing	Toyota
24	William Byron	Hendrick Motorsports	Chevrolet
31	Justin Haley	Kaulig Racing	Chevrolet
34	Michael McDowell	Front Row Motorsports	Ford
38	Todd Gilliland	Front Row Motorsports	Ford
41	Ryan Preece	Stewart-Haas Racing	Ford
42	Noah Gragson (R)	Legacy Motor Club	Chevrolet
43	Erik Jones	Legacy Motor Club	Chevrolet
45	Tyler Reddick	23XI Racing	Toyota
47	Ricky Stenhouse Jr.	JTG Daugherty Racing	Chevrolet
48	Alex Bowman	Hendrick Motorsports	Chevrolet
51	Ryan Newman	Rick Ware Racing	Ford
54	Ty Gibbs (R)	Joe Gibbs Racing	Toyota
77	Ty Dillon	Spire Motorsports	Chevrolet
78	B. J. McLeod	Live Fast Motorsports	Chevrolet
99	Daniel Suárez	Trackhouse Racing	Chevrolet
Official entry list

== Practice ==
William Byron was the fastest in the practice session with a time of 23.057 seconds and a speed of 117.101 mph (188.456 km/h).

=== Practice results ===
Pos	No.	Driver	Team	Manufacturer	Time	Speed
1	24	William Byron	Hendrick Motorsports	Chevrolet	23.057	117.101
2	9	Chase Elliott	Hendrick Motorsports	Chevrolet	23.203	116.364
3	17	Chris Buescher	RFK Racing	Ford	23.249	116.134
Official practice results

== Qualifying ==
Tyler Reddick scored the pole for the race with a time 23.749 of and a speed of 113.689 mph (182.965 km/h).

=== Qualifying results ===
Pos	No.	Driver	Team	Manufacturer	R1	R2
1	45	Tyler Reddick	23XI Racing	Toyota	23.588	23.749
2	8	Kyle Busch	Richard Childress Racing	Chevrolet	23.610	23.760
3	11	Denny Hamlin	Joe Gibbs Racing	Toyota	23.559	23.781
4	9	Chase Elliott	Hendrick Motorsports	Chevrolet	23.881	23.788
5	23	Bubba Wallace	23XI Racing	Toyota	23.862	23.815
6	24	William Byron	Hendrick Motorsports	Chevrolet	23.666	23.816
7	54	Ty Gibbs (R)	Joe Gibbs Racing	Toyota	23.538	23.819
8	4	Kevin Harvick	Stewart-Haas Racing	Ford	23.359	23.842
9	47	Ricky Stenhouse Jr.	JTG Daugherty Racing	Chevrolet	23.825	23.927
10	19	Martin Truex Jr.	Joe Gibbs Racing	Toyota	23.433	23.974
11	41	Ryan Preece	Stewart-Haas Racing	Ford	23.641	—
12	42	Noah Gragson (R)	Legacy Motor Club	Chevrolet	23.697	—
13	6	Brad Keselowski	RFK Racing	Ford	23.712	—
14	5	Kyle Larson	Hendrick Motorsports	Chevrolet	23.713	—
15	48	Alex Bowman	Hendrick Motorsports	Chevrolet	23.724	—
16	38	Todd Gilliland	Front Row Motorsports	Ford	23.731	—
17	3	Austin Dillon	Richard Childress Racing	Chevrolet	23.735	—
18	34	Michael McDowell	Front Row Motorsports	Ford	23.798	—
19	1	Ross Chastain	Trackhouse Racing	Chevrolet	23.857	—
20	14	Chase Briscoe	Stewart-Haas Racing	Ford	23.857	—
21	78	B. J. McLeod	Live Fast Motorsports	Chevrolet	23.919	—
22	21	Harrison Burton	Wood Brothers Racing	Ford	23.951	—
23	22	Joey Logano	Team Penske	Ford	23.974	—
24	10	Aric Almirola	Stewart-Haas Racing	Ford	23.978	—
25	12	Ryan Blaney	Team Penske	Ford	24.008	—
26	17	Chris Buescher	RFK Racing	Ford	24.083	—
27	43	Erik Jones	Legacy Motor Club	Chevrolet	24.088	—
28	31	Justin Haley	Kaulig Racing	Chevrolet	24.093	—
29	20	Christopher Bell	Joe Gibbs Racing	Toyota	24.117	—
30	2	Austin Cindric	Team Penske	Ford	24.125	—
31	7	Corey LaJoie	Spire Motorsports	Chevrolet	24.192	—
32	51	Ryan Newman	Rick Ware Racing	Ford	24.207	—
33	99	Daniel Suárez	Trackhouse Racing	Chevrolet	24.264	—
34	77	Ty Dillon	Spire Motorsports	Chevrolet	24.281	—
35	15	J. J. Yeley (i)	Rick Ware Racing	Ford	24.297	—
36	16	Derek Kraus (i)	Kaulig Racing	Chevrolet	24.634	—
Official qualifying results

== Race ==
=== Race results ===
==== Stage results ====
Stage One Laps: 70

Pos	No	Driver	Team	Manufacturer	Points
1	45	Tyler Reddick	23XI Racing	Toyota	10
2	23	Bubba Wallace	23XI Racing	Toyota	9
3	11	Denny Hamlin	Joe Gibbs Racing	Toyota	8
4	9	Chase Elliott	Hendrick Motorsports	Chevrolet	7
5	4	Kevin Harvick	Stewart-Haas Racing	Ford	6
6	41	Ryan Preece	Stewart-Haas Racing	Ford	5
7	24	William Byron	Hendrick Motorsports	Chevrolet	4
8	6	Brad Keselowski	RFK Racing	Ford	3
9	10	Aric Almirola	Stewart-Haas Racing	Ford	2
10	54	Ty Gibbs (R)	Joe Gibbs Racing	Toyota	1
Official stage one results

Stage Two Laps: 160

Pos	No	Driver	Team	Manufacturer	Points
1	6	Brad Keselowski	RFK Racing	Ford	10
2	17	Chris Buescher	RFK Racing	Ford	9
3	45	Tyler Reddick	23XI Racing	Toyota	8
4	23	Bubba Wallace	23XI Racing	Toyota	7
5	11	Denny Hamlin	Joe Gibbs Racing	Toyota	6
6	8	Kyle Busch	Richard Childress Racing	Chevrolet	5
7	41	Ryan Preece	Stewart-Haas Racing	Ford	4
8	19	Martin Truex Jr.	Joe Gibbs Racing	Toyota	3
9	54	Ty Gibbs (R)	Joe Gibbs Racing	Toyota	2
10	22	Joey Logano	Team Penske	Ford	1
Official stage two results

=== Final Stage results ===
Stage Three Laps: 170

Pos	Grid	No	Driver	Team	Manufacturer	Laps	Points
1	26	17	Chris Buescher	RFK Racing	Ford	400	49
2	3	11	Denny Hamlin	Joe Gibbs Racing	Toyota	400	49
3	2	8	Kyle Busch	Richard Childress Racing	Chevrolet	400	39
4	23	22	Joey Logano	Team Penske	Ford	400	34
5	11	41	Ryan Preece	Stewart-Haas Racing	Ford	400	41
6	13	6	Brad Keselowski	RFK Racing	Ford	400	44
7	10	19	Martin Truex Jr.	Joe Gibbs Racing	Toyota	400	33
8	24	10	Aric Almirola	Stewart-Haas Racing	Ford	400	31
9	17	3	Austin Dillon	Richard Childress Racing	Chevrolet	400	28
10	8	4	Kevin Harvick	Stewart-Haas Racing	Ford	400	33
11	20	14	Chase Briscoe	Stewart-Haas Racing	Ford	400	26
12	5	23	Bubba Wallace	23XI Racing	Toyota	400	41
13	4	9	Chase Elliott	Hendrick Motorsports	Chevrolet	400	31
14	25	12	Ryan Blaney	Team Penske	Ford	400	23
15	7	54	Ty Gibbs (R)	Joe Gibbs Racing	Toyota	400	25
16	1	45	Tyler Reddick	23XI Racing	Toyota	400	39
17	9	47	Ricky Stenhouse Jr.	JTG Daugherty Racing	Chevrolet	400	20
18	15	48	Alex Bowman	Hendrick Motorsports	Chevrolet	400	19
19	14	5	Kyle Larson	Hendrick Motorsports	Chevrolet	400	18
20	29	20	Christopher Bell	Joe Gibbs Racing	Toyota	399	17
21	6	24	William Byron	Hendrick Motorsports	Chevrolet	399	20
22	18	34	Michael McDowell	Front Row Motorsports	Ford	399	15
23	27	43	Erik Jones	Legacy Motor Club	Chevrolet	399	14
24	19	1	Ross Chastain	Trackhouse Racing	Chevrolet	399	13
25	16	38	Todd Gilliland	Front Row Motorsports	Ford	399	12
26	30	2	Austin Cindric	Team Penske	Ford	399	11
27	36	16	A. J. Allmendinger	Kaulig Racing	Chevrolet	399	10
28	12	42	Noah Gragson (R)	Legacy Motor Club	Chevrolet	398	9
29	32	51	Ryan Newman	Rick Ware Racing	Ford	398	8
30	28	31	Justin Haley	Kaulig Racing	Chevrolet	398	7
31	22	21	Harrison Burton	Wood Brothers Racing	Ford	397	6
32	31	7	Corey LaJoie	Spire Motorsports	Chevrolet	397	5
33	33	99	Daniel Suárez	Trackhouse Racing	Chevrolet	396	4
34	34	77	Ty Dillon	Spire Motorsports	Chevrolet	396	3
35	35	15	J. J. Yeley (i)	Rick Ware Racing	Ford	396	0
36	21	78	B. J. McLeod	Live Fast Motorsports	Chevrolet	395	1
Official race results

=== Race statistics ===
- Lead changes: 18 among 8 different drivers
- Cautions/Laps: 3 for 21 laps
- Red flags: 0
- Time of race: 3 hours, 2 minutes, and 13 seconds
- Average speed: 98.783 miles per hour (158.976 km/h)

== Media ==
=== Television ===
USA covered the race on the television side. Rick Allen, Jeff Burton, Steve Letarte and three-time Richmond winner Dale Earnhardt Jr. called the race from the broadcast booth. Dave Burns, Marty Snider and Dillon Welch handled the pit road duties from pit lane.

USA
Booth announcers	Pit reporters
Lap-by-lap: Rick Allen; Color-commentator: Jeff Burton; Color-commentator: Steve Letarte; Color-commentator: Dale Earnhardt Jr.	Dave Burns; Marty Snider; Dillon Welch

=== Radio ===
The Motor Racing Network had the radio call for the race, which was also simulcast on Sirius XM NASCAR Radio. Alex Hayden, Jeff Striegle and Todd Gordon called the race from the broadcast booth for MRN when the field races through the front straightaway. Dave Moody called the race from a platform when the field races down the backstraightaway. Jacklyn Drake, Kim Coon and Winston Kelley called the action for MRN from pit lane.

MRN Radio
Booth announcers	Turn announcers	Pit reporters
Lead announcer: Alex Hayden; Announcer: Jeff Striegle; Announcer: Todd Gordon	Backstretch: Dave Moody	Jacklyn Drake; Kim Coon; Winston Kelley

== Standings after the race ==
Drivers' Championship standings

	Pos	Driver	Points
	1	Martin Truex Jr.	744
1	2	Denny Hamlin	705 (–39)
1	3	William Byron	701 (–43)
	4	Christopher Bell	653 (–91)
1	5	Kyle Busch	648 (–96)
2	6	Kevin Harvick	634 (–110)
2	7	Ross Chastain	626 (–118)
1	8	Kyle Larson	619 (–125)
	9	Ryan Blaney	614 (–130)
	10	Joey Logano	609 (–135)
1	11	Brad Keselowski	603 (–141)
1	12	Tyler Reddick	602 (–142)
	13	Chris Buescher	598 (–146)
	14	Ricky Stenhouse Jr.	514 (–230)
	15	Bubba Wallace	506 (–238)
	16	Michael McDowell	470 (–274)
Official driver's standings

Manufacturers' Championship standings

Pos	Manufacturer	Points
1	Chevrolet	820
2	Toyota	764 (–56)
3	Ford	744 (–76)

- Note: Only the first 16 positions are included for the driver standings.
- . – Driver has clinched a position in the NASCAR Cup Series playoffs.

== Notes ==
Previous race: 2023 HighPoint.com 400	NASCAR Cup Series; 2023 season	Next race: 2023 FireKeepers Casino 400
