= Ziółkowski =

Ziółkowski (feminine: Ziółkowska; plural: Ziółkowscy) is a Polish surname. It is a toponymic surname related to the place named Ziółków. It may refer to:

- Aleksandra Ziolkowska-Boehm (born 1949), Polish author
- Andrew Ziolkowski (1963–1994), Australian politician
- Eric Ziolkowski (born 1958), American philosopher
- Fabrice Ziolkowski (born 1954), French-American screenwriter, director, producer, and voice director
- Jan Ziółkowski (born 2005), Polish footballer
- Jan M. Ziolkowski (born 1956), American linguist and philosopher
- Janusz Ziółkowski (1924–2000), Polish sociologist
- Jim Ziolkowski, American businessman
- Korczak Ziolkowski (1908–1982), Polish-American designer and sculptor
- Marek Ziółkowski (born 1955), Polish diplomat
- Richard W. Ziolkowski, American scientist and engineer
- Ruth Ziolkowski (1926–2014), American director of Crazy Horse Memorial
- Szymon Ziółkowski (born 1976), Polish hammer thrower
- Theodore Ziolkowski (1932–2020), American scholar in German studies and comparative literature

== See also ==
- Żółkowski
- Żółkiewski
