= Żółkowski =

Żółkowski (masculine), Żółkowska (feminine) is a Polish-language toponymic surname derived from the place name Żółkwy. Spelling variants include Żołkowski, Żułkowski, Zółkowski, etc. Notable people with this last name include:

- Alojzy Żółkowski, several people
- Antoni Józef Żółkowski, auxiliary Bishop of Vilnius (1744–1763)
- Fortunat Alojzy Gonzaga Żółkowski (1777–1822), Polish stage actor
- Joanna Żółkowska (born 1950), Polish actress

== See also ==
- Ziółkowski, from Ziółków
- Żółkiewski, from Żółkiew
