= Kostecki =

Kostecki (feminine: Kostecka; plural: Kosteccy) is a Polish surname. It may refer to:

- Brodie Kostecki (born 1997), Australian racing driver
- Dawid Kostecki (1981–2019), Polish boxer
- Jake Kostecki (born 2000), Australian racing driver
- Joanna Sakowicz-Kostecka (born 1984), Polish tennis player
- John Kostecki (born 1964), American sailor
- Józef Kostecki (1922–1980), Polish actor
- Kurt Kostecki (born 1998), Australian racing driver
- Nepomucena Kostecka (1807–1847), Polish actress
- Robert Kostecki (born 1969), Polish wrestler
