= Alojzy Żółkowski =

Alojzy Żółkowski may refer to:

- Fortunat Alojzy Gonzaga Żółkowski (1777-1822), Polish actor, father of Alojzy Gonzaga Jazon
- Alojzy Gonzaga Jazon Żółkowski (1814-1889), Polish actor, singer, son of Fortunat Alojzy Gonzaga
