= Literature and Theology =

- Discipline: Theology and Literary Studies
- Language: English
- Edited by: Mark Knight

Publication details
- History: 1987-present
- Publisher: Oxford University Press
- Frequency: Quarterly

Standard abbreviations
- ISO 4: Lit. Theol.

Indexing
- ISSN: 0269-1205 (print); 1477-4623 (web)

Links
- Journal homepage

Literature and Theology is a quarterly peer-reviewed indisciplinary academic journal of theology and literary studies published by Oxford University Press. It "provides a critical non-confessional forum for both textual analysis and theoretical speculation, encouraging explorations of how religion is embedded in culture". The current editorial board headed by Mark Knight (Lancaster University) includes several leading names in the academic field of religion and literature, including Dr Jo Carruthers (Lancaster University), Emma Mason (University of Warwick), Dr Elizabeth Anderson (University of Aberdeen), Richard Rosengarten (University of Chicago), Alana Vincent (University of Chester), Linn Tonstad (Yale) and Gerard Loughlin (University of Durham).

Included in the Advisory Board are Kevin Hart (University of Virginia), Dr Andrew Hass (University of Stirling), Elisabeth Jay (Oxford Brookes University), Jeff Keuss (Seattle Pacific University), Julia Rienhard Lupton (University of California, Irvine), David Jasper (University of Glasgow), Heather Walton (University of Glasgow), and Eric Ziolkowski (Lafayette College).

The journal is abstracted and indexed in the Annual Bibliography of English Language and Literature, the British Humanities Index, IBZ Internationale Bibliographie der Geistes und Sozialwissenschaftlichen Zeitschriftenliteratur, the International Review of Biblical Studies, MLA International Bibliography, the ATLA Religion Database, Religious & Theological Abstracts, several ProQuest databases, and elsewhere.
