= Brodie Kostecki =

Australian professional racing driver

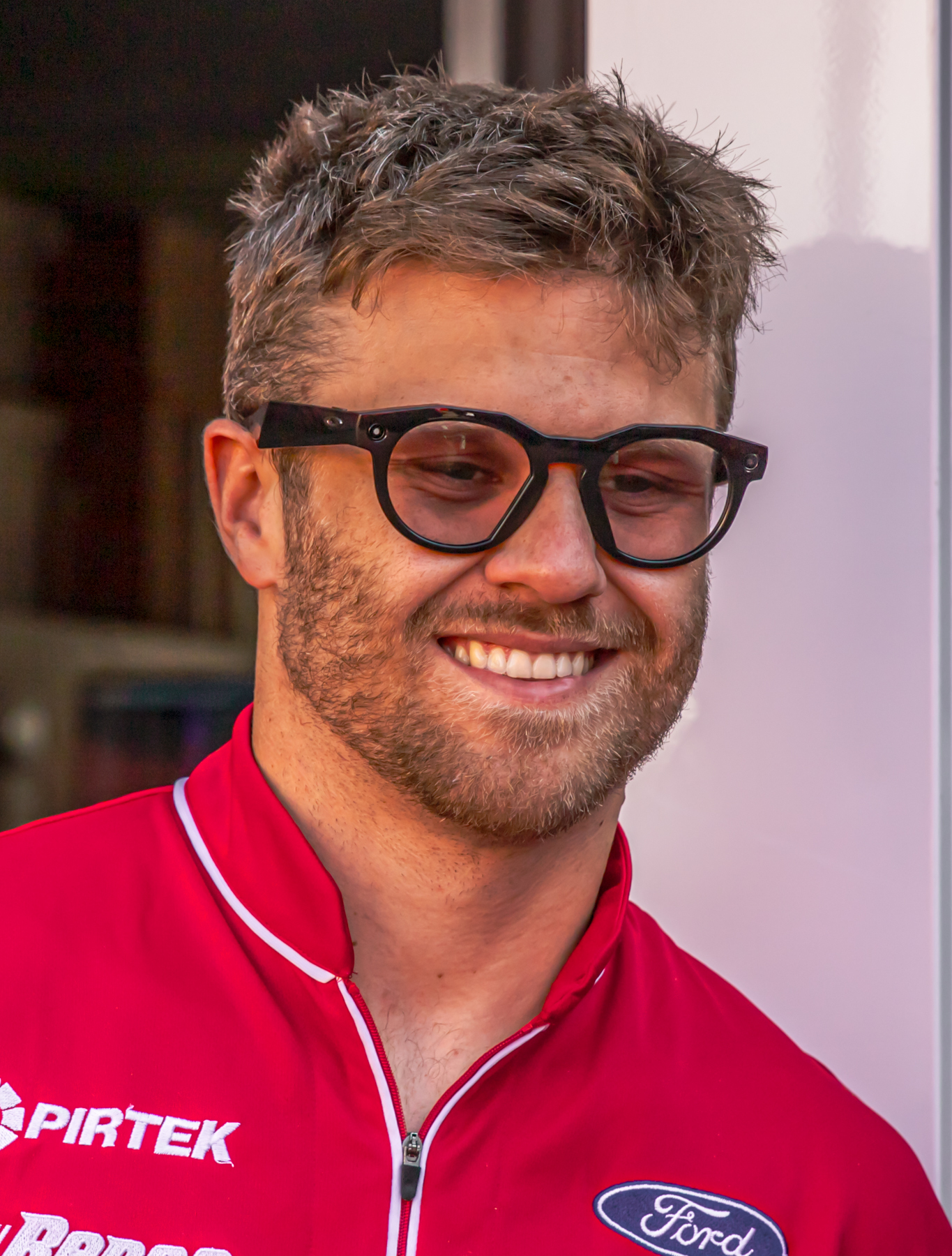
- Kostecki at Sydney Motorsport Park in 2026
- Nationality: Australian
- Born: Brodie Paul Kostecki; 1 November 1997 (age 29) Perth, Western Australia
- Relatives: Kurt Kostecki (cousin); Jake Kostecki (cousin)
- Categorisation: FIA Silver (until 2023); FIA Gold (2024–2026); FIA Platinum (2027–)

Previous series
- 2017–20: Dunlop Super2 Series

Supercars Championship career
- Championships: 1 (2023)
- Races: 175
- Wins: 18
- Podiums: 45
- Pole positions: 23
- 2023 position: 1st (2888 pts)

NASCAR Cup Series career
- 1 race run over 1 year
- 2023 position: 38th
- Best finish: 38th (2023)
- First race: 2023 Verizon 200 at the Brickyard (Indianapolis RC)
Wins	Top tens	Poles
0	0	0

ARCA Menards Series East career
- 16 races run over 2 years
- Best finish: 18th (2014)
- First race: 2013 Blue Ox 100 (Richmond)
- Last race: 2014 Drive Sober 150 (Dover)
Wins	Top tens	Poles
0	4	2
- Statistics up to date as of November 28, 2023.

Brodie Paul "Bush" Kostecki (born 1 November 1997) is an Australian professional racing driver. He has been competing in the Repco Supercars Championship, driving the #17 Ford Mustang GT for Dick Johnson Racing, Kostecki won the 2023 Supercars Championship. He also previously competed in the NASCAR Cup Series and what is now the ARCA Menards Series East.

== Racing career ==
=== NASCAR ===
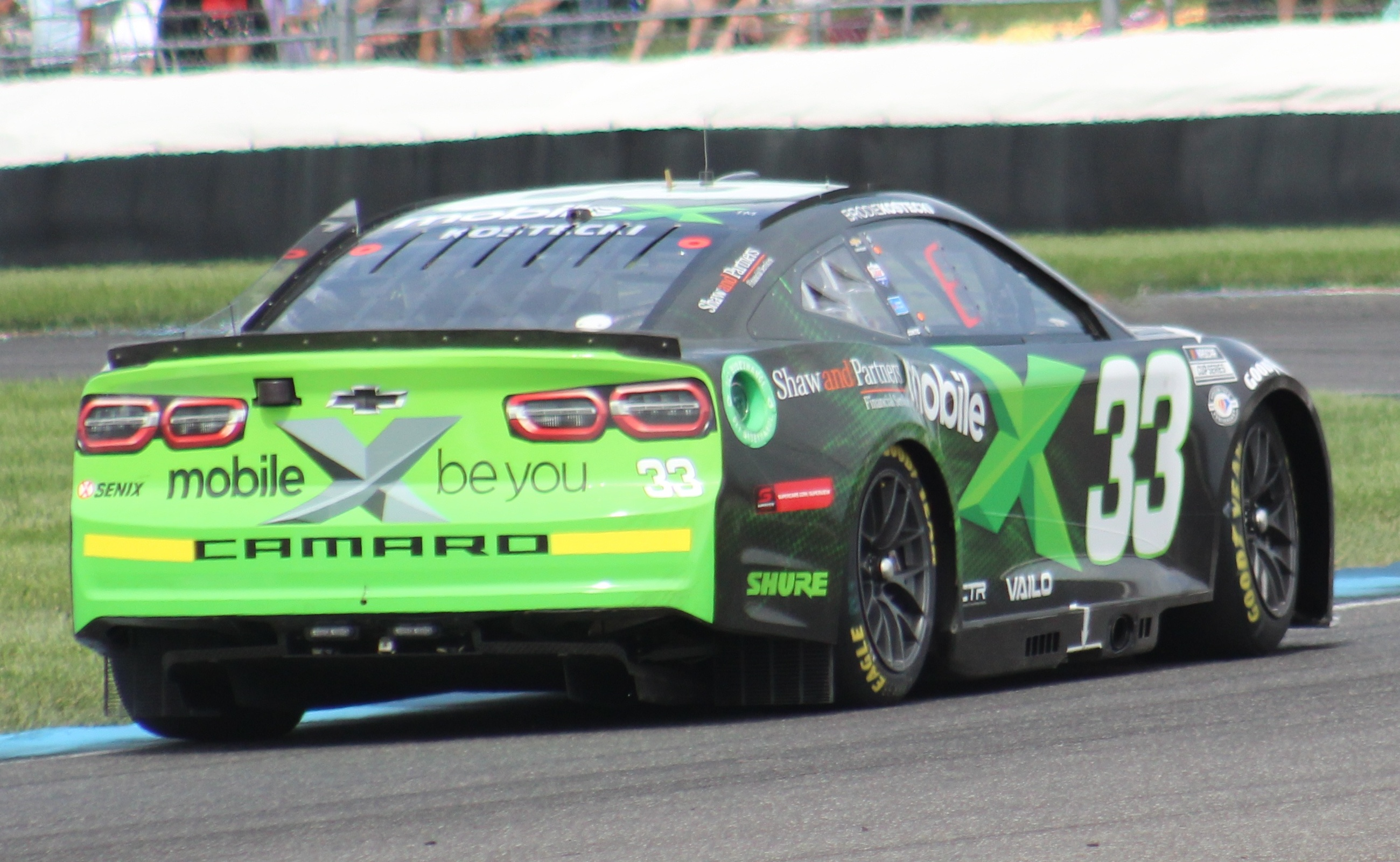
Kostecki in his Cup Series debut at the Indianapolis Road Course in 2023

In 2023, Kostecki returned to NASCAR to make his Cup Series debut in the race at the Indianapolis Motor Speedway road course. He drove for Richard Childress Racing, which fielded an additional car for him that weekend, the No. 33 Chevrolet. He would qualify in eleventh and would finish in 22nd position.

On October 2, 2023, it was announced that Kostecki would run part-time in the Cup Series again in 2024 and it would be for Erebus Motorsport, his team in the Supercars Series, which would debut in NASCAR in a partnership with Richard Childress Racing. The announcement had a picture of a Cup Series car with the No. 99, Kostecki's Supercar number, but with Trackhouse Racing already having that number in the Cup Series (and Hendrick Motorsports already having their other number 9), Erebus will need to pick a different number to use for their entry. Richard Childress stated that the plan is for Kostecki to run up to five Cup Series races in 2024, including an oval race. On May 1, 2024, Paul Morris, Kostecki's long–time mentor, confirmed that the planned Cup races had been axed.

=== Supercars ===
==== 2019 ====
Kostecki debuted in the 2019 Bathurst 1000, alongside cousin Jake Kostecki. The pair failed to finish after a crash on Lap 111. The pair competed at the following two rounds at the Gold Coast and Sandown with a best finish of eighth place coming at Sandown.

==== 2020 ====
Kostecki was given an opportunity by Eggleston Motorsport, run by Rachael and Ben Eggleston. He claimed two poles, two wins, and three fastest laps in the COVID-shortened 2020 Dunlop Series.

Kostecki was signed by Erebus for the 2020 Bathurst 1000 alongside Anton De Pasquale. They finished ninth in the 2020 edition of The Great Race.

==== 2021 ====
In 2021, Kostecki was signed alongside Will Brown to drive for Erebus following the departures of David Reynolds and Anton de Pasquale. He scored three podiums throughout the year at Sandown, Eastern Creek and Bathurst. He ended the year in ninth place, scoring 1788 points.

==== 2022 ====
In 2022, Kostecki jumped to seventh in the points standings but scored one less podium than the year prior. These podium appearances coming at Eastern Creek and The Bend.

==== 2023 ====
Kostecki entered the 2023 season without a single win from the previous year, with five podiums from 71 starts. In 2023, Kostecki and his team, Erebus Motorsport, secured both the drivers and teams titles.

==== 2024 ====
In early February 2024, just weeks before the season opening Bathurst 500, it was reported that Kostecki had parted ways with the team after rumours swirled about how Kostecki was being treated by the team internally. Further, naming rights sponsor Coca-Cola, as well as Shaw and Partners, and SCTR withdrew their financial support of the team. Kostecki was replaced by Todd Hazelwood at the 2024 season opening round, as well as the Melbourne round. On April 7, 2024, it was announced that Kostecki would rejoin the team at the Taupō round.

== Personal life ==
Kostecki is of Ukrainian descent; his surname uses the Polish-language spelling.

Kostecki earned the nickname "Bush" after an incident at Norwell Motorplex where he and his cousin Kurt experienced brake failure in a VT Commodore whilst Kurt was driving and Brodie was in the passenger seat. Upon realising the brakes had failed, Brodie jumped out the passenger side door of the car at approximately 110kph, sliding his body across grass and up an embankment into a bush. Miraculously, he was not injured in the crash.

== Career results ==
=== Speedway summary ===
Season	Series	Position	Car	Team
2011	USAC Speed2 Western US Asphalt Midget Series	**2nd**	Ford	Team Arcoplate Racing
2011	USAC Speed2 Western US Dirt Midget Series	7th	Ford	Team Arcoplate Racing
2011	USAC Utah Ford Focus Midget Car Series	1th	Ford	Team Arcoplate Racing
2011	USAC Western Young Guns Ford Focus Midget Car - Dirt	51st	Ford	Team Arcoplate Racing
2011	USAC Speed2 Western US Dirt Midget Series - Pavement	183rd	Ford	Team Arcoplate Racing
2012	UARA STARS Late Model Series	21st	Chevrolet	Team Arcoplate Racing
2013	UARA STARS Late Model Series Results	11th	Ford	Team Arcoplate Racing
2013	NASCAR K&N Pro Series East	44th	Chevrolet SS	Team Arcoplate Racing
2014	NASCAR K&N Pro Series East	18th	Toyota Camry	Team Arcoplate Racing
2023	NASCAR Cup Series	38th	Chevrolet Camaro ZL1	Richard Childress Racing

=== NASCAR ===
(key) (Bold – Pole position awarded by qualifying time. Italics – Pole position earned by points standings or practice time. * – Most laps led.)

==== Cup Series ====
NASCAR Cup Series results
Year	Team	No.	Make	1	2	3	4	5	6	7	8	9	10	11	12	13	14	15	16	17	18	19	20	21	22	23	24	25	26	27	28	29	30	31	32	33	34	35	36	NCSC	Pts	Ref
2023	Richard Childress Racing	33	Chevy	DAY	CAL	LVS	PHO	ATL	COA	RCH	BRD	MAR	TAL	DOV	KAN	DAR	CLT	GTW	SON	NSH	CSC	ATL	NHA	POC	RCH	MCH	IRC; 22	GLN	DAY	DAR	KAN	BRI	TEX	TAL	ROV	LVS	HOM	MAR	PHO	38th	15	

==== K&N Pro Series East ====
NASCAR K&N Pro Series East results
Year	Team	No.	Make	1	2	3	4	5	6	7	8	9	10	11	12	13	14	15	16	NKNPSEC	Pts	Ref
2013	Team Arcoplate Racing	43	Chevy	BRI	GRE	FIF	RCH; 25	BGS	IOW; 27	LGY	COL	IOW; 25	VIR	GRE	NHA	DOV	RAL			44th	55	
2014	Team Arcoplate Racing	43	Toyota	NSM; 20	DAY; 18	BRI; 12	GRE; 8	RCH; 8	**IOW**; 20	BGS	FIF	LGY	NHA; 9	COL; 21	IOW; 12	**GLN**; 24	VIR; 20	GRE; 22	DOV; 5	18th	375	

^{*} Season still in progress

=== Karting career summary ===
Season	Series	Position
2010	Australian National Sprint Kart Championship - Junior National Light	8th
2010	Oakleigh Kart Club Top Guns - Junior National Light	12th

=== Career summary ===
Season	Series	Position	Car	Team
2017	Dunlop Super2 Series	15th	Ford FG Falcon	Matt Stone Racing
2018	Dunlop Super2 Series	5th	Holden VF Commodore	Kostecki Brothers Racing
2019	Dunlop Super2 Series	18th	Holden VF Commodore	Kostecki Brothers Racing
2019	Virgin Australia Supercars Championship	47th	Holden ZB Commodore	Kostecki Brothers Racing
2020	Dunlop Super2 Series	8th	Holden VF Commodore	Eggleston Motorsport
2020	Virgin Australia Supercars Championship	34th	Holden ZB Commodore	Erebus Motorsport
2021	Repco Supercars Championship	9th	Holden ZB Commodore	Erebus Motorsport
2022	Repco Supercars Championship	7th	Holden ZB Commodore	Erebus Motorsport
2023	Repco Supercars Championship	**1st**	Chevrolet Camaro ZL1	Erebus Motorsport
2024	Repco Supercars Championship	17th	Chevrolet Camaro ZL1	Erebus Motorsport
2025	Race of Champions - Nations Cup	**2nd**	Various	RoC
2025	Repco Supercars Championship	9th	Ford Mustang S650	Dick Johnson Racing

=== Super2 Series results ===
(key) (Round results only), (2020 Race results only)

Super2 Series results
Year	Team	No.	Car	1	2	3	4	5	6	7	8	9	10	11	12	13	14	15	16	17	18	19	20	21	Position	Points
2017	Matt Stone Racing	57	Ford FG Falcon	ADE; R1; DNS	ADE; R2; 16	ADE; R3; Ret	SYM; R4; 16	SYM; R5; 13	SYM; R6; 13	SYM; R7; 8	PHI; R8; 19	PHI; R9; 15	PHI; R10; 12	PHI; R11; 11	TOW; R12; 14	TOW; R13; Ret	SYD; R14; 16	SYD; R15; 11	SYD; R16; 19	SYD; R17; 14	SAN; R18; 16	SAN; R19; 13	NEW; R20; 7	NEW; R21; 7	15th	781
2018	Kostecki Brothers Racing	57	Holden VF Commodore	ADE; R1; 7	ADE; R2; 8	ADE; R3; 5	SYM; R4; 4	SYM; R5; 2	SYM; R6; 6	BAR; R7; 3	BAR; R8; 14	BAR; R9; Ret	TOW; R10; 7	TOW; R11; 3	SAN; R12; 1	**SAN**; **R13**; 1	BAT; R14; Ret	NEW; R15; 1	NEW; R16; C						5th	1202
2019	Kostecki Brothers Racing	57	Holden VF Commodore	ADE; R1; 4	ADE; R2; 1	**ADE**; **R3**; 2	BAR; R4; 18	BAR; R5; 5	TOW; R6	TOW; R7	QLD; R8	QLD; R9	BAT; R10	SAN; R11	SAN; R12	NEW; R13	NEW; R14								18th	434
2020	Eggleston Motorsport	38	Holden VF Commodore	ADE; R1; 1	**ADE**; **R2**; 1	ADE; R3; 3	SYD; R4; 9	SYD; R5; 3	BAT; R6	BAT; R7															8th	499

=== Supercars Championship results ===
Supercars results
Year	Team	Car	1	2	3	4	5	6	7	8	9	10	11	12	13	14	15	16	17	18	19	20	21	22	23	24	25	26	27	28	29	30	31	32	33	34	35	36	37	Position	Points
2019	Kostecki Brothers Racing	Holden ZB Commodore	ADE; R1	ADE; R2	MEL; R3	MEL; R4	MEL; R5	MEL; R6	SYM; R7	SYM; R8	PHI; R9	PHI; R10	BAR; R11	BAR; R12	WIN; R13	WIN; R14	HID; R15	HID; R16	TOW; R17	TOW; R18	QLD; R19	QLD; R20	BEN; R21	BEN; R22	PUK; R23	PUK; R24	BAT; R25; Ret	SUR; R26; 18	SUR; R27; 16	SAN; QR; 8	SAN; R28; 16	NEW; R29	NEW; R30							47th	233
2020	Erebus Motorsport	Holden ZB Commodore	ADE; R1	ADE; R2	MEL; R3	MEL; R4	MEL; R5	MEL; R6	SMP1; R7	SMP1; R8	SMP1; R9	SMP2; R10	SMP2; R11	SMP2; R12	HID1; R13	HID1; R14	HID1; R15	HID2; R16	HID2; R17	HID2; R18	TOW1; R19	TOW1; R20	TOW1; R21	TOW2; R22	TOW2; R23	TOW2; R24	BEN1; R25	BEN1; R26	BEN1; R27	BEN2; R28	BEN2; R29	BEN2; R30	BAT; R31; 9							34th	168
2021	Erebus Motorsport	Holden ZB Commodore	BAT1; R1; 11	BAT1; R2; 12	SAN; R3; 17	SAN; R4; 13	SAN; R5; 2	SYM; R6; 10	SYM; R7; 16	SYM; R8; 18	BEN; R9; 6	BEN; R10; 5	BEN; R11; 11	HID; R12; 8	HID; R13; 15	HID; R14; 24	TOW1; R15; 13	TOW1; R16; 15	TOW2; R17; 22	TOW2; R18; 7	TOW2; R19; 14	SMP1; R20; 3	SMP1; R21; 4	SMP1; R22; 15	SMP2; R23; 23	SMP2; R24; 20	SMP2; R25; Ret	SMP3; R26; 4	SMP3; R27; 9	SMP3; R28; 11	SMP4; R29; 8	SMP4; R30; C	BAT2; R31; 3							9th	1788
2022	Erebus Motorsport	Holden ZB Commodore	SMP; R1; 5	**SMP**; **R2**; **2**	SYM; R3; 4	SYM; R4; 19	SYM; R5; 22	MEL; R6; 14	MEL; R7; 7	MEL; R8; 15	MEL; R9; 5	BAR; R10; 8	BAR; R11; 6	BAR; R12; 21	WIN; R13; 7	WIN; R14; 11	WIN; R15; 13	HID; R16; 10	HID; R17; 16	HID; R18; 24	TOW; R19; 12	TOW; R20; 16	BEN; R21; 6	BEN; R22; 24	BEN; R23; 3	SAN; R24; 11	SAN; R25; 23	SAN; R26; 16	PUK; R27; 20	PUK; R28; 18	PUK; R29; 19	BAT; R30; 4	SUR; R31; 7	SUR; R32; 5	ADE; R33; 4	ADE; R34; 8				7th	2142
2023	Erebus Motorsport	Chevrolet Camaro ZL1	**NEW**; **R1**; **3**	NEW; R2; 6	MEL; R3; 2	MEL; R4; 1	**MEL**; **R5**; **1**	MEL; R6; 3	BAR; R7; 2	BAR; R8; 2	BAR; R9; 3	SYM; R10; 23	**SYM**; **R11**; **2**	**SYM**; **R12**; **3**	HID; R13; 4	HID; R14; 4	HID; R15; 26	TOW; R16; 19	TOW; R17; 2	SMP; R18; 1	SMP; R19; 8	**BEN**; **R20**; **1**	BEN; R21; 1	**BEN**; **R22**; **1**	SAN; R23; 2	**BAT**; **R24**; **2**	SUR; R25; 5	**SUR**; **R26**; **2**	**ADE**; **R27**; **6**	**ADE**; **R28**; **8**										1st	2888
2024	Erebus Motorsport	Chevrolet Camaro ZL1	BAT1; R1	BAT1; R2	MEL; R3	MEL; R4	MEL; R5	MEL; R6	TAU; R7; 14	TAU; R8; 13	BAR; R9; 22	BAR; R10; Ret	HID; R11; DNS	HID; R12; 3	TOW; R13; 19	TOW; R14; 18	SMP; R15; 9	SMP; R16; 7	SYM; R17; 5	SYM; R18; 23	SAN; R19; Ret	**BAT2**; **R20**; **1**	SUR; R21; 5	**SUR**; **R22**; **1**	ADE; R23; 6	ADE; R24; 6														17th	1488
2025	Dick Johnson Racing	Ford Mustang S650	SYD; R1; 6	SYD; R2; 14	SYD; R3; 4	MEL; R4; 4	MEL; R5; 7	MEL; R6; 5	MEL; R7; C	TAU; R8; 12	**TAU**; **R9**; **3**	**TAU**; **R10**; **4**	SYM; R11; DSQ	SYM; R12; 12	SYM; R13; 22	BAR; R14; 5	BAR; R15; 7	BAR; R16; 11	HID; R17; 9	HID; R18; 5	HID; R19; 11	**TOW**; **R20**; **1**	TOW; R21; 5	TOW; R22; 16	QLD; R23; 5	QLD; R24; 24	QLD; R25; 5	BEN; R26; 1	**BAT**; **R27**; **18**	SUR; R28; DNS	SUR; R29; 11	SAN; R30; 5	SAN; R31; 5	ADE; R31; 1	ADE; R23; 10	ADE; R34; 6				9th	3537
2026	Dick Johnson Racing	Ford Mustang S650	SMP; R1; 10	SMP; R2; 2	SMP; R3; 12	**MEL**; **R4**; **1**	MEL; R5; 1	MEL; R6; 2	MEL; R7; 1	**TAU**; **R8**; **1**	TAU; R9; 6	CHR; R10; 2	**CHR**; **R11**; **1**	CHR; R12; 5	CHR; R13; 18	SYM; R14; 3	SYM; R15; 24	SYM; R16; 12	**HID**; **R17**; **4**	HID; R18; 3	HID; R19; WD	**TOW**; **R20**; 2	**TOW**; **R21**; 3	TOW; R22; 1	BAR; R23; 24	BAR; R24; 6	BAR; R25; 12	QLD; R26	QLD; R27	QLD; R28	BEN; R29	BAT; R30	SUR; R31	SUR; R32	SAN; R33	SAN; R34	ADE; R35	ADE; R36	ADE; R37	4th*	1590*

=== Complete Bathurst 1000 results ===
Year	Team	Car	Co-driver	Position	Laps
2019	Kostecki Brothers Racing	Holden Commodore ZB	(Australia) Jake Kostecki	DNF	111
2020	Erebus Motorsport	Holden Commodore ZB	(Australia) Anton de Pasquale	9th	161
2021	Erebus Motorsport	Holden Commodore ZB	(Australia) David Russell	**3rd**	161
2022	Erebus Motorsport	Holden Commodore ZB	(Australia) David Russell	4th	161
2023	Erebus Motorsport	Chevrolet Camaro Mk.6	(Australia) David Russell	**2nd**	161
2024	Erebus Motorsport	Chevrolet Camaro Mk.6	(Australia) Todd Hazelwood	**1st**	161
2025	Dick Johnson Racing	Ford Mustang S650	(Australia) Todd Hazelwood	18th	155
2026	Dick Johnson Racing	Ford Mustang S650	(Australia) Todd Hazelwood	**1st**	161

=== The Bend 500 Results ===
Year	Team	Car	Co-driver	Position	Laps
2025	Dick Johnson Racing	Ford Mustang S650	(Australia) Todd Hazelwood	**1st**	102
2026	Dick Johnson Racing	Ford Mustang S650	(Australia) Todd Hazelwood		

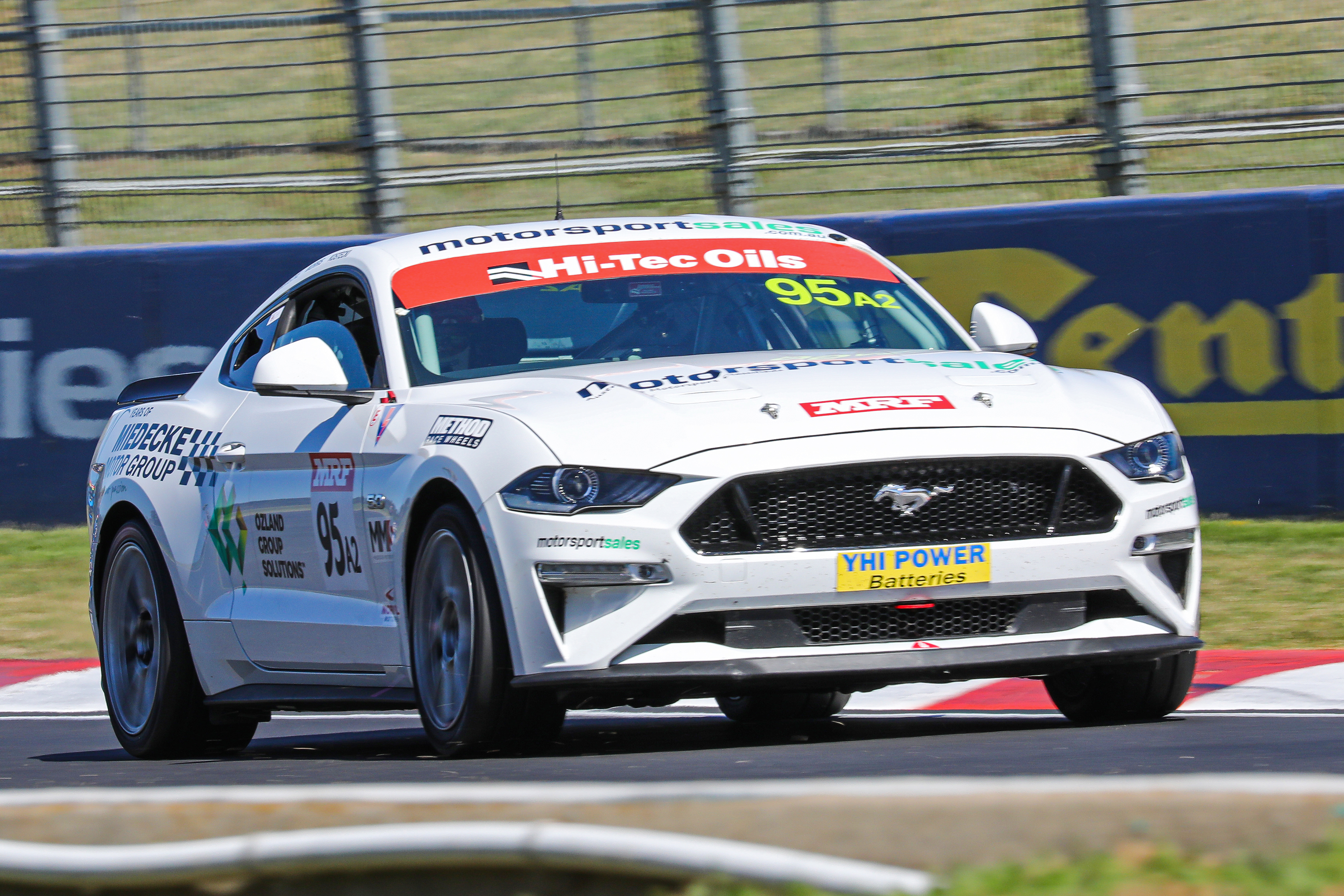
The Class A2-winning Ford Mustang GT of George Miedecke, Paul Morris and Brodie Kostecki.

=== Bathurst 6 Hour results ===
Year	Team	Co-drivers	Car	Class	Laps	Pos.	Class pos.
2021	Miedecke Motor Group	(Australia) George Miedecke (Australia) Paul Morris	Ford Mustang GT	A2	120	5th	**1st**

Sporting positions
Preceded by Shane van Gisbergen	Supercars Championship; Champion; 2023	Succeeded by Will Brown
Preceded by Shane van Gisbergen; Richie Stanaway	Winner of the Bathurst 1000; 2024; With: Todd Hazelwood	Succeeded by Matt Payne; Garth Tander
Awards and achievements
Preceded by Alex Peroni; 2020	Peter Brock Medal; 2023	Succeeded by Incumbent
