= 2023 Verizon 200 at the Brickyard =

NASCAR Cup Series race

Race details
- Race 24 of 36 in the 2023 NASCAR Cup Series
- Date: August 13, 2023
- Location: Indianapolis Motor Speedway in Speedway, Indiana
- Course: Permanent racing facility
- Course length: 2.439 miles (3.925 km)
- Distance: 82 laps, 199.998 mi (321.85 km)
- Average speed: 96.329 miles per hour (155.026 km/h)

Pole position
Driver	Daniel Suárez	Trackhouse Racing
- Time: 1:27.968

Most laps led
Driver	Michael McDowell	Front Row Motorsports
- Laps: 54

Winner
No. 34	Michael McDowell	Front Row Motorsports

Television in the United States
- Network: NBC
- Announcers: Rick Allen, Jeff Burton, Steve Letarte and Dale Earnhardt Jr.

Radio in the United States
- Radio: PRN; IMS Radio
- Booth announcers: Doug Rice, Mark Jaynes and Jeff Hammond
- Turn announcers: Nick Yeoman (Turns 1–4), Pat Patterson (Turns 5–9), Michael Young (Turns 10–11) and Pat Patterson (Turns 12–14)

The 2023 Verizon 200 at the Brickyard was a NASCAR Cup Series race that was held on August 13, 2023, at Indianapolis Motor Speedway in Speedway, Indiana. Contested over 82 laps on the 2.439-mile (3.925 km) road course, it was the 24th race of the 2023 NASCAR Cup Series season.

This was the final Cup Series race held on Indianapolis' Infield Road Course, as the Brickyard 400 would return in 2024.

== Report ==
=== Background ===
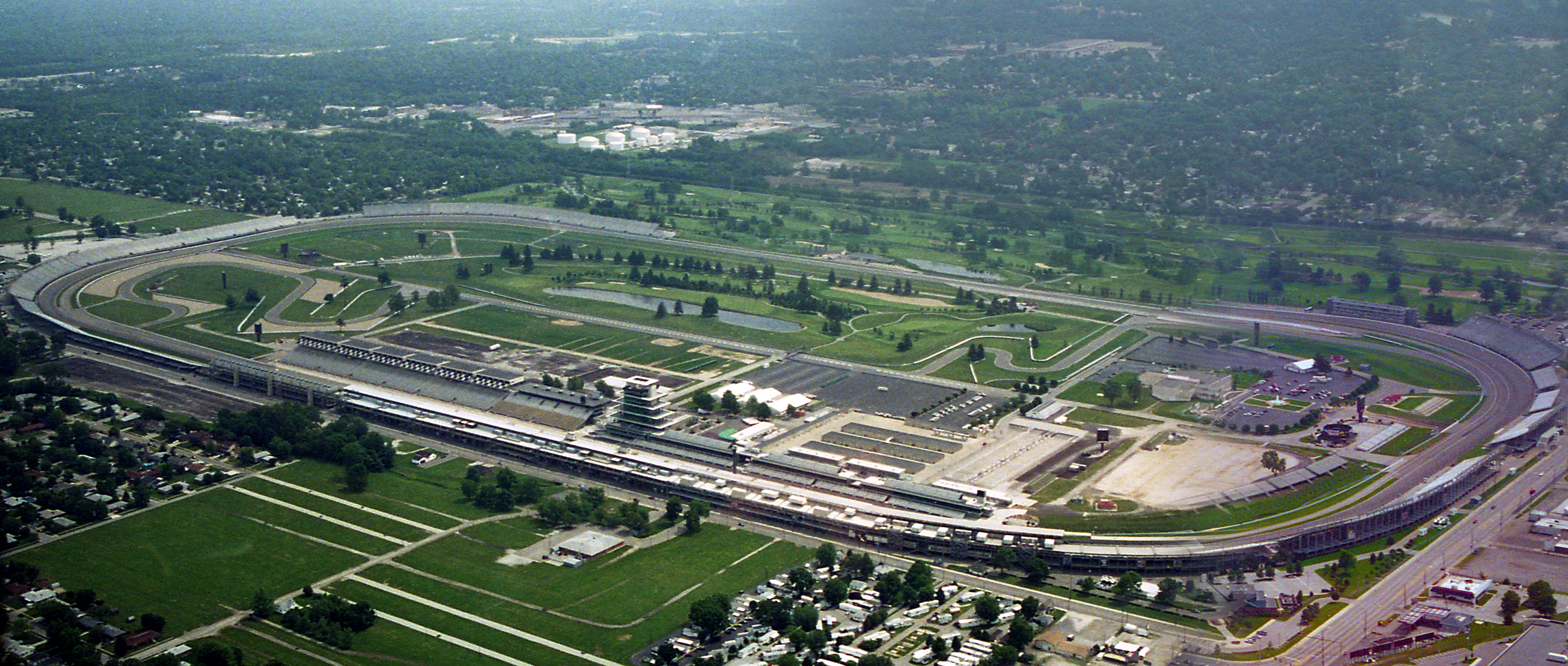
Indianapolis Motor Speedway, the track where the race was held.

The Indianapolis Motor Speedway, located in Speedway, Indiana, (an enclave suburb of Indianapolis) in the United States, is the home of the Indianapolis 500 and the Brickyard 400. It is located on the corner of 16th Street and Georgetown Road, approximately six miles (10 km) west of Downtown Indianapolis.

Constructed in 1909, it is the original speedway, the first racing facility so named. It has a permanent seating capacity estimated at 235,000 with infield seating raising capacity to an approximate 400,000. It is the highest-capacity sports venue in the world.

==== Entry list ====
- (R) denotes rookie driver.
- (i) denotes the driver ineligible for series driver points.

No.	Driver	Team	Manufacturer
1	Ross Chastain	Trackhouse Racing	Chevrolet
2	Austin Cindric	Team Penske	Ford
3	Austin Dillon	Richard Childress Racing	Chevrolet
4	Kevin Harvick	Stewart-Haas Racing	Ford
5	Kyle Larson	Hendrick Motorsports	Chevrolet
6	Brad Keselowski	RFK Racing	Ford
7	Corey LaJoie	Spire Motorsports	Chevrolet
8	Kyle Busch	Richard Childress Racing	Chevrolet
9	Chase Elliott	Hendrick Motorsports	Chevrolet
10	Aric Almirola	Stewart-Haas Racing	Ford
11	Denny Hamlin	Joe Gibbs Racing	Toyota
12	Ryan Blaney	Team Penske	Ford
14	Chase Briscoe	Stewart-Haas Racing	Ford
15	Jenson Button	Rick Ware Racing	Ford
16	A. J. Allmendinger	Kaulig Racing	Chevrolet
17	Chris Buescher	RFK Racing	Ford
19	Martin Truex Jr.	Joe Gibbs Racing	Toyota
20	Christopher Bell	Joe Gibbs Racing	Toyota
21	Harrison Burton	Wood Brothers Racing	Ford
22	Joey Logano	Team Penske	Ford
23	Bubba Wallace	23XI Racing	Toyota
24	William Byron	Hendrick Motorsports	Chevrolet
31	Justin Haley	Kaulig Racing	Chevrolet
33	Brodie Kostecki	Richard Childress Racing	Chevrolet
34	Michael McDowell	Front Row Motorsports	Ford
38	Todd Gilliland	Front Row Motorsports	Ford
41	Ryan Preece	Stewart-Haas Racing	Ford
42	Mike Rockenfeller	Legacy Motor Club	Chevrolet
43	Erik Jones	Legacy Motor Club	Chevrolet
45	Tyler Reddick	23XI Racing	Toyota
47	Ricky Stenhouse Jr.	JTG Daugherty Racing	Chevrolet
48	Alex Bowman	Hendrick Motorsports	Chevrolet
51	Andy Lally	Rick Ware Racing	Ford
54	Ty Gibbs (R)	Joe Gibbs Racing	Toyota
67	Kamui Kobayashi (i)	23XI Racing	Toyota
77	Ty Dillon	Spire Motorsports	Chevrolet
78	Josh Bilicki (i)	Live Fast Motorsports	Chevrolet
91	Shane van Gisbergen (i)	Trackhouse Racing	Chevrolet
99	Daniel Suárez	Trackhouse Racing	Chevrolet
Official entry list

== Practice ==
Michael McDowell was the fastest in the practice session with a time of 1:29.127 seconds and a speed of 98.516 mph (158.546 km/h).

=== Practice results ===
Pos	No.	Driver	Team	Manufacturer	Time	Speed
1	34	Michael McDowell	Front Row Motorsports	Ford	1:29.127	98.516
2	5	Kyle Larson	Hendrick Motorsports	Chevrolet	1:29.199	98.436
3	38	Todd Gilliland	Front Row Motorsports	Ford	1:29.229	98.403
Official practice results

== Qualifying ==
Daniel Suárez scored the pole for the race with a time 1:27.968 of and a speed of 99.814 mph (160.635 km/h). William Byron was not able to participate in qualifying after failing inspection three times. First-time Cup Series competitor Brodie Kostecki qualified 11th, but had to start at the rear of the field after switching to a backup car.

=== Qualifying results ===
Pos	No.	Driver	Team	Manufacturer	R1	R2
1	99	Daniel Suárez	Trackhouse Racing	Chevrolet	1:28.386	1:27.968
2	45	Tyler Reddick	23XI Racing	Toyota	1:28.050	1:28.113
3	9	Chase Elliott	Hendrick Motorsports	Chevrolet	1:28.388	1:28.335
4	34	Michael McDowell	Front Row Motorsports	Ford	1:27.909	1:28.434
5	8	Kyle Busch	Richard Childress Racing	Chevrolet	1:28.482	1:28.496
6	5	Kyle Larson	Hendrick Motorsports	Chevrolet	1:27.941	1:28.499
7	20	Christopher Bell	Joe Gibbs Racing	Toyota	1:28.474	1:28.516
8	91	Shane van Gisbergen	Trackhouse Racing	Chevrolet	1:28.404	1:28.544
9	48	Alex Bowman	Hendrick Motorsports	Chevrolet	1:27.957	1:28.606
10	54	Ty Gibbs (R)	Joe Gibbs Racing	Toyota	1:27.962	1:28.606
11	33	Brodie Kostecki	Richard Childress Racing	Chevrolet	1:28.495	—
12	19	Martin Truex Jr.	Joe Gibbs Racing	Toyota	1:28.533	—
13	14	Chase Briscoe	Stewart-Haas Racing	Ford	1:28.539	—
14	7	Corey LaJoie	Spire Motorsports	Chevrolet	1:28.656	—
15	31	Justin Haley	Kaulig Racing	Chevrolet	1:28.669	—
16	12	Ryan Blaney	Team Penske	Ford	1:28.764	—
17	17	Chris Buescher	RFK Racing	Ford	1:28.839	—
18	22	Joey Logano	Team Penske	Ford	1:28.855	—
19	23	Bubba Wallace	23XI Racing	Toyota	1:28.924	—
20	2	Austin Cindric	Team Penske	Ford	1:28.939	—
21	1	Ross Chastain	Trackhouse Racing	Chevrolet	1:28.947	—
22	6	Brad Keselowski	RFK Racing	Ford	1:28.953	—
23	38	Todd Gilliland	Front Row Motorsports	Ford	1:28.962	—
24	21	Harrison Burton	Wood Brothers Racing	Ford	1:28.996	—
25	11	Denny Hamlin	Joe Gibbs Racing	Toyota	1:29.005	—
26	16	A. J. Allmendinger	Kaulig Racing	Chevrolet	1:29.065	—
27	3	Austin Dillon	Richard Childress Racing	Chevrolet	1:29.068	—
28	67	Kamui Kobayashi	23XI Racing	Toyota	1:29.077	—
29	51	Andy Lally	Rick Ware Racing	Ford	1:29.119	—
30	41	Ryan Preece	Stewart-Haas Racing	Ford	1:29.203	—
31	15	Jenson Button	Rick Ware Racing	Ford	1:29.269	—
32	78	Josh Bilicki (i)	Live Fast Motorsports	Chevrolet	1:29.400	—
33	10	Aric Almirola	Stewart-Haas Racing	Ford	1:29.537	—
34	47	Ricky Stenhouse Jr.	JTG Daugherty Racing	Chevrolet	1:29.694	—
35	77	Ty Dillon	Spire Motorsports	Chevrolet	1:29.762	—
36	43	Erik Jones	Legacy Motor Club	Chevrolet	1:29.789	—
37	42	Mike Rockenfeller	Legacy Motor Club	Chevrolet	1:29.819	—
38	4	Kevin Harvick	Stewart-Haas Racing	Ford	1:29.820	—
39	24	William Byron	Hendrick Motorsports	Chevrolet	00.000	—
Official qualifying results

== Race ==
=== Race results ===
==== Stage results ====
Stage One Laps: 15

Pos	No	Driver	Team	Manufacturer	Points
1	34	Michael McDowell	Front Row Motorsports	Ford	10
2	99	Daniel Suárez	Trackhouse Racing	Chevrolet	9
3	9	Chase Elliott	Hendrick Motorsports	Chevrolet	8
4	45	Tyler Reddick	23XI Racing	Toyota	7
5	5	Kyle Larson	Hendrick Motorsports	Chevrolet	6
6	8	Kyle Busch	Richard Childress Racing	Chevrolet	5
7	20	Christopher Bell	Joe Gibbs Racing	Toyota	4
8	48	Alex Bowman	Hendrick Motorsports	Chevrolet	3
9	91	Shane van Gisbergen (i)	Trackhouse Racing	Chevrolet	0
10	19	Martin Truex Jr.	Joe Gibbs Racing	Toyota	1
Official stage one results

Stage Two Laps: 20

Pos	No	Driver	Team	Manufacturer	Points
1	11	Denny Hamlin	Joe Gibbs Racing	Toyota	10
2	34	Michael McDowell	Front Row Motorsports	Ford	9
3	99	Daniel Suárez	Trackhouse Racing	Chevrolet	8
4	6	Brad Keselowski	RFK Racing	Ford	7
5	9	Chase Elliott	Hendrick Motorsports	Chevrolet	6
6	8	Kyle Busch	Richard Childress Racing	Chevrolet	5
7	45	Tyler Reddick	23XI Racing	Toyota	4
8	48	Alex Bowman	Hendrick Motorsports	Chevrolet	3
9	14	Chase Briscoe	Stewart-Haas Racing	Ford	2
10	5	Kyle Larson	Hendrick Motorsports	Chevrolet	1
Official stage two results

=== Final Stage results ===
Stage Three Laps: 47

Pos	Grid	No	Driver	Team	Manufacturer	Laps	Points
1	4	34	Michael McDowell	Front Row Motorsports	Ford	82	59
2	3	9	Chase Elliott	Hendrick Motorsports	Chevrolet	82	49
3	1	99	Daniel Suárez	Trackhouse Racing	Chevrolet	82	51
4	2	45	Tyler Reddick	23XI Racing	Toyota	82	44
5	9	48	Alex Bowman	Hendrick Motorsports	Chevrolet	82	38
6	13	14	Chase Briscoe	Stewart-Haas Racing	Ford	82	33
7	12	19	Martin Truex Jr.	Joe Gibbs Racing	Toyota	82	31
8	6	5	Kyle Larson	Hendrick Motorsports	Chevrolet	82	36
9	7	20	Christopher Bell	Joe Gibbs Racing	Toyota	82	32
10	8	91	Shane van Gisbergen (i)	Trackhouse Racing	Chevrolet	82	0
11	17	17	Chris Buescher	RFK Racing	Ford	82	26
12	10	54	Ty Gibbs (R)	Joe Gibbs Racing	Toyota	82	25
13	16	12	Ryan Blaney	Team Penske	Ford	82	24
14	39	24	William Byron	Hendrick Motorsports	Chevrolet	82	23
15	20	2	Austin Cindric	Team Penske	Ford	82	22
16	27	3	Austin Dillon	Richard Childress Racing	Chevrolet	82	21
17	21	1	Ross Chastain	Trackhouse Racing	Chevrolet	82	20
18	19	23	Bubba Wallace	23XI Racing	Toyota	82	19
19	25	11	Denny Hamlin	Joe Gibbs Racing	Toyota	82	28
20	22	6	Brad Keselowski	RFK Racing	Ford	82	24
21	24	21	Harrison Burton	Wood Brothers Racing	Ford	82	16
22	11	33	Brodie Kostecki	Richard Childress Racing	Chevrolet	82	15
23	38	4	Kevin Harvick	Stewart-Haas Racing	Ford	82	14
24	37	42	Mike Rockenfeller	Legacy Motor Club	Chevrolet	81	13
25	34	47	Ricky Stenhouse Jr.	JTG Daugherty Racing	Chevrolet	81	12
26	26	16	A. J. Allmendinger	Kaulig Racing	Chevrolet	81	11
27	35	77	Ty Dillon	Spire Motorsports	Chevrolet	81	10
28	31	15	Jenson Button	Rick Ware Racing	Ford	81	9
29	14	7	Corey LaJoie	Spire Motorsports	Chevrolet	81	8
30	29	51	Andy Lally	Rick Ware Racing	Ford	81	7
31	30	41	Ryan Preece	Stewart-Haas Racing	Ford	81	6
32	32	78	Josh Bilicki (i)	Live Fast Motorsports	Chevrolet	81	0
33	28	67	Kamui Kobayashi (i)	23XI Racing	Toyota	81	0
34	18	22	Joey Logano	Team Penske	Ford	81	3
35	36	43	Erik Jones	Legacy Motor Club	Chevrolet	81	2
36	5	8	Kyle Busch	Richard Childress Racing	Chevrolet	80	11
37	23	38	Todd Gilliland	Front Row Motorsports	Ford	80	1
38	15	31	Justin Haley	Kaulig Racing	Chevrolet	80	1
39	33	10	Aric Almirola	Stewart-Haas Racing	Ford	79	1
Official race results

=== Race statistics ===
- Lead changes: 10 among 7 different drivers
- Cautions/Laps: 1 for 3 laps
- Red flags: 0
- Time of race: 2 hours, 9 minutes, and 58 seconds
- Average speed: 96.329 miles per hour (155.026 km/h)

== Media ==
=== Television ===
NBC Sports covered the race on the television side. Rick Allen, Jeff Burton, Steve Letarte, and Dale Earnhardt Jr. called the race from the broadcast booth. Dave Burns, Kim Coon, and Marty Snider handled the pit road duties from pit lane.

NBC
Booth announcers	Pit reporters
Lap-by-lap: Rick Allen; Color-commentator: Jeff Burton; Color-commentator: Steve Letarte; Color-commentator: Dale Earnhardt Jr.	Dave Burns; Kim Coon; Marty Snider

=== Radio ===
Indianapolis Motor Speedway Radio Network and the Performance Racing Network jointly co-produce the radio broadcast for the race, which was simulcast on Sirius XM NASCAR Radio, and aired on IMS or PRN stations, depending on contractual obligations. The lead announcers and two pit reporters were PRN staff, while the turns announcers and two pit reporters were from IMS.

PRN/IMS Radio
Booth announcers	Turn announcers	Pit reporters
Lead announcer: Doug Rice; Announcer: Mark Jaynes; Announcer: Jeff Hammond	Turns 1–4: Nick Yeoman; Turns 5–9: Jake Query; Turns 10–11: Michael Young; Turns 12–14: Pat Patterson	Brad Gillie; Brett McMillan; Ryan Myrehn; Leslie Gudel

== Standings after the race ==
Drivers' Championship standings

	Pos	Driver	Points
	1	Martin Truex Jr.	830
	2	Denny Hamlin	770 (–60)
	3	William Byron	726 (–104)
	4	Christopher Bell	709 (–121)
1	5	Kyle Larson	698 (–132)
1	6	Kevin Harvick	677 (–153)
	7	Ross Chastain	676 (–154)
	8	Brad Keselowski	675 (–155)
1	9	Ryan Blaney	666 (–164)
1	10	Chris Buescher	665 (–165)
2	11	Kyle Busch	660 (–170)
1	12	Tyler Reddick	653 (–177)
1	13	Joey Logano	639 (–191)
	14	Bubba Wallace	560 (–270)
2	15	Michael McDowell	542 (–288)
1	16	Ricky Stenhouse Jr.	542 (–288)
Official driver's standings

Manufacturers' Championship standings

Pos	Manufacturer	Points
1	Chevrolet	887
2	Toyota	832 (–55)
3	Ford	824 (–63)

- Note: Only the first 16 positions are included for the driver standings.
- . – Driver has clinched a position in the NASCAR Cup Series playoffs.

Previous race: 2023 FireKeepers Casino 400	NASCAR Cup Series; 2023 season	Next race: 2023 Go Bowling at The Glen
