= 2023 Go Bowling at The Glen =

NASCAR Cup Series race

Race details
- Race 25 of 36 in the 2023 NASCAR Cup Series
- Date: August 20, 2023
- Location: Watkins Glen International in Watkins Glen, New York
- Course: Permanent racing facility
- Course length: 2.45 miles (3.94 km)
- Distance: 90 laps, 220.5 mi (354.6 km)
- Average speed: 111.426 miles per hour (179.323 km/h)

Pole position
Driver	Denny Hamlin	Joe Gibbs Racing
- Time: 1:10.392

Most laps led
Driver	William Byron	Hendrick Motorsports
- Laps: 66

Winner
No. 24	William Byron	Hendrick Motorsports

Television in the United States
- Network: USA
- Announcers: Rick Allen, Steve Letarte (booth), Mike Bagley (Esses), Dale Earnhardt Jr. (Turn 5) and Jeff Burton (Turns 6–7)

Radio in the United States
- Radio: MRN
- Booth announcers: Alex Hayden, Jeff Striegle and Todd Gordon
- Turn announcers: Dave Moody (Esses), Kyle Rickey (Turn 5) and Dan Hubbard (Turns 6–7)

The 2023 Go Bowling at The Glen was a NASCAR Cup Series race held on August 20, 2023, at Watkins Glen International in Watkins Glen, New York. Contested over 90 laps on the 2.45-mile (3.94 km) road course, it was the 25th race of the 2023 NASCAR Cup Series season.

== Report ==
=== Background ===
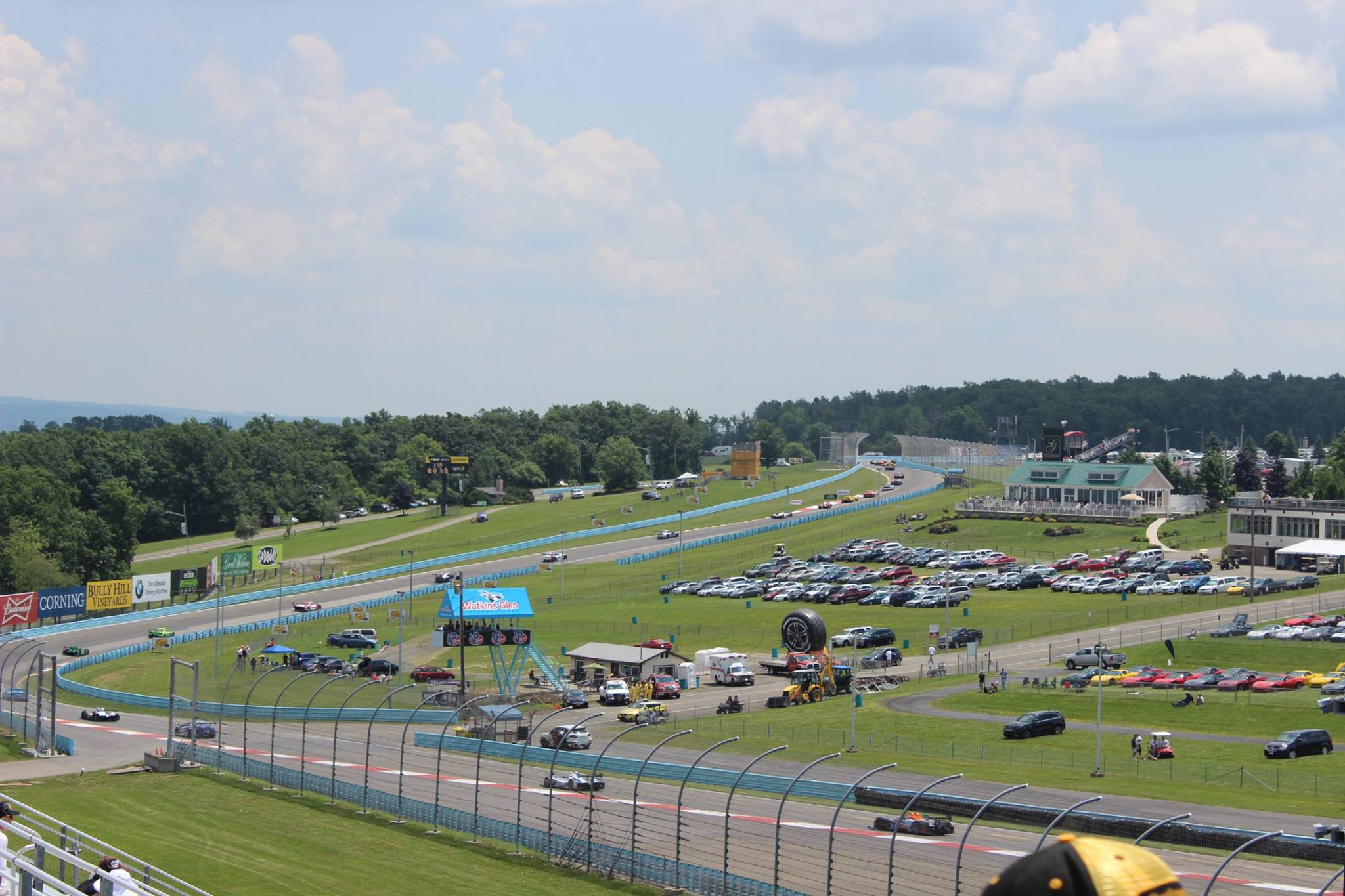
Watkins Glen International

Watkins Glen International (nicknamed "The Glen") is an automobile race track located in Watkins Glen, New York at the southern tip of Seneca Lake. It was long known around the world as the home of the Formula One United States Grand Prix, which it hosted for twenty consecutive years (1961–1980), but the site has been home to road racing of nearly every class, including the World Sportscar Championship, Trans-Am, Can-Am, NASCAR Cup Series, the International Motor Sports Association and the IndyCar Series.

Initially, public roads in the village were used for the race course. In 1956 a permanent circuit for the race was built. In 1968 the race was extended to six hours, becoming the 6 Hours of Watkins Glen. The circuit's current layout has more or less been the same since 1971, although a chicane was installed at the uphill Esses in 1975 to slow cars through these corners, where there was a fatality during practice at the 1973 United States Grand Prix. The chicane was removed in 1985, but another chicane called the "Inner Loop" was installed in 1992 after J.D. McDuffie's fatal accident during the previous year's NASCAR Winston Cup event.

The circuit is known as the Mecca of North American road racing and is a very popular venue among fans and drivers. The facility is currently owned by International Speedway Corporation.

==== Entry list ====
- (R) denotes rookie driver.
- (i) denotes the driver ineligible for series driver points.

No.	Driver	Team	Manufacturer
1	Ross Chastain	Trackhouse Racing	Chevrolet
2	Austin Cindric	Team Penske	Ford
3	Austin Dillon	Richard Childress Racing	Chevrolet
4	Kevin Harvick	Stewart-Haas Racing	Ford
5	Kyle Larson	Hendrick Motorsports	Chevrolet
6	Brad Keselowski	RFK Racing	Ford
7	Corey LaJoie	Spire Motorsports	Chevrolet
8	Kyle Busch	Richard Childress Racing	Chevrolet
9	Chase Elliott	Hendrick Motorsports	Chevrolet
10	Aric Almirola	Stewart-Haas Racing	Ford
11	Denny Hamlin	Joe Gibbs Racing	Toyota
12	Ryan Blaney	Team Penske	Ford
14	Chase Briscoe	Stewart-Haas Racing	Ford
15	Andy Lally	Rick Ware Racing	Ford
16	A. J. Allmendinger	Kaulig Racing	Chevrolet
17	Chris Buescher	RFK Racing	Ford
19	Martin Truex Jr.	Joe Gibbs Racing	Toyota
20	Christopher Bell	Joe Gibbs Racing	Toyota
21	Harrison Burton	Wood Brothers Racing	Ford
22	Joey Logano	Team Penske	Ford
23	Bubba Wallace	23XI Racing	Toyota
24	William Byron	Hendrick Motorsports	Chevrolet
31	Justin Haley	Kaulig Racing	Chevrolet
34	Michael McDowell	Front Row Motorsports	Ford
38	Todd Gilliland	Front Row Motorsports	Ford
41	Ryan Preece	Stewart-Haas Racing	Ford
42	Mike Rockenfeller	Legacy Motor Club	Chevrolet
43	Erik Jones	Legacy Motor Club	Chevrolet
45	Tyler Reddick	23XI Racing	Toyota
47	Ricky Stenhouse Jr.	JTG Daugherty Racing	Chevrolet
48	Alex Bowman	Hendrick Motorsports	Chevrolet
51	Cole Custer (i)	Rick Ware Racing	Ford
54	Ty Gibbs (R)	Joe Gibbs Racing	Toyota
77	Ty Dillon	Spire Motorsports	Chevrolet
78	Josh Bilicki (i)	Live Fast Motorsports	Chevrolet
99	Daniel Suárez	Trackhouse Racing	Chevrolet
Official entry list

== Practice ==
A. J. Allmendinger was the fastest in the practice session with a time of 1:11.148 seconds and a speed of 123.967 mph (199.506 km/h).

=== Practice results ===
Pos	No.	Driver	Team	Manufacturer	Time	Speed
1	16	A. J. Allmendinger	Kaulig Racing	Chevrolet	1:11.148	123.967
2	7	Corey LaJoie	Spire Motorsports	Chevrolet	1:11.220	123.842
3	24	William Byron	Hendrick Motorsports	Chevrolet	1:11.239	123.809
Official practice results

== Qualifying ==
Denny Hamlin scored the pole for the race with a time of 1:10.392 and a speed of 125.298 mph (201.648 km/h).

=== Qualifying results ===
Pos	No.	Driver	Team	Manufacturer	R1	R2
1	11	Denny Hamlin	Joe Gibbs Racing	Toyota	1:10.644	1:10.392
2	24	William Byron	Hendrick Motorsports	Chevrolet	1:10.520	1:10.582
3	34	Michael McDowell	Front Row Motorsports	Ford	1:10.527	1:10.589
4	54	Ty Gibbs (R)	Joe Gibbs Racing	Toyota	1:10.598	1:10.622
5	5	Kyle Larson	Hendrick Motorsports	Chevrolet	1:10.700	1:10.631
6	16	A. J. Allmendinger	Kaulig Racing	Chevrolet	1:10.641	1:10.761
7	20	Christopher Bell	Joe Gibbs Racing	Toyota	1:10.824	1:10.903
8	45	Tyler Reddick	23XI Racing	Toyota	1:10.563	1:11.022
9	8	Kyle Busch	Richard Childress Racing	Chevrolet	1:10.924	1:11.078
10	7	Corey LaJoie	Spire Motorsports	Chevrolet	1:10.765	1:11.224
11	22	Joey Logano	Team Penske	Ford	1:10.926	—
12	23	Bubba Wallace	23XI Racing	Toyota	1:10.946	—
13	17	Chris Buescher	RFK Racing	Ford	1:10.966	—
14	99	Daniel Suárez	Trackhouse Racing	Chevrolet	1:10.981	—
15	9	Chase Elliott	Hendrick Motorsports	Chevrolet	1:10.992	—
16	3	Austin Dillon	Richard Childress Racing	Chevrolet	1:11.080	—
17	2	Austin Cindric	Team Penske	Ford	1:11.123	—
18	48	Alex Bowman	Hendrick Motorsports	Chevrolet	1:11.153	—
19	19	Martin Truex Jr.	Joe Gibbs Racing	Toyota	1:11.154	—
20	31	Justin Haley	Kaulig Racing	Chevrolet	1:11.192	—
21	42	Mike Rockenfeller	Legacy Motor Club	Chevrolet	1:11.199	—
22	1	Ross Chastain	Trackhouse Racing	Chevrolet	1:11.205	—
23	12	Ryan Blaney	Team Penske	Ford	1:11.233	—
24	6	Brad Keselowski	RFK Racing	Ford	1:11.384	—
25	38	Todd Gilliland	Front Row Motorsports	Ford	1:11.384	—
26	14	Chase Briscoe	Stewart-Haas Racing	Ford	1:11.447	—
27	10	Aric Almirola	Stewart-Haas Racing	Ford	1:11.456	—
28	47	Ricky Stenhouse Jr.	JTG Daugherty Racing	Chevrolet	1:11.473	—
29	15	Andy Lally	Rick Ware Racing	Ford	1:11.485	—
30	41	Ryan Preece	Stewart-Haas Racing	Ford	1:11.720	—
31	43	Erik Jones	Legacy Motor Club	Chevrolet	1:11.723	—
32	21	Harrison Burton	Wood Brothers Racing	Ford	1:11.742	—
33	4	Kevin Harvick	Stewart-Haas Racing	Ford	1:11.758	—
34	51	Cole Custer (i)	Rick Ware Racing	Ford	1:11.834	—
35	78	Josh Bilicki (i)	Live Fast Motorsports	Chevrolet	1:11.947	—
36	77	Ty Dillon	Spire Motorsports	Chevrolet	1:12.063	—
Official qualifying results

== Race ==
=== Race results ===
==== Stage results ====
Stage One Laps: 20

Pos	No	Driver	Team	Manufacturer	Points
1	34	Michael McDowell	Front Row Motorsports	Ford	10
2	24	William Byron	Hendrick Motorsports	Chevrolet	9
3	11	Denny Hamlin	Joe Gibbs Racing	Toyota	8
4	54	Ty Gibbs (R)	Joe Gibbs Racing	Toyota	7
5	16	A. J. Allmendinger	Kaulig Racing	Chevrolet	6
6	5	Kyle Larson	Hendrick Motorsports	Chevrolet	5
7	20	Christopher Bell	Joe Gibbs Racing	Toyota	4
8	23	Bubba Wallace	23XI Racing	Toyota	3
9	8	Kyle Busch	Richard Childress Racing	Chevrolet	2
10	45	Tyler Reddick	23XI Racing	Toyota	1
Official stage one results

Stage Two Laps: 20

Pos	No	Driver	Team	Manufacturer	Points
1	24	William Byron	Hendrick Motorsports	Chevrolet	10
2	11	Denny Hamlin	Joe Gibbs Racing	Toyota	9
3	54	Ty Gibbs (R)	Joe Gibbs Racing	Toyota	8
4	5	Kyle Larson	Hendrick Motorsports	Chevrolet	7
5	16	A. J. Allmendinger	Kaulig Racing	Chevrolet	6
6	20	Christopher Bell	Joe Gibbs Racing	Toyota	5
7	9	Chase Elliott	Hendrick Motorsports	Chevrolet	4
8	8	Kyle Busch	Richard Childress Racing	Chevrolet	3
9	23	Bubba Wallace	23XI Racing	Toyota	2
10	3	Austin Dillon	Richard Childress Racing	Chevrolet	1
Official stage two results

=== Final Stage results ===
Stage Three Laps: 50

Pos	Grid	No	Driver	Team	Manufacturer	Laps	Points
1	2	24	William Byron	Hendrick Motorsports	Chevrolet	90	59
2	1	11	Denny Hamlin	Joe Gibbs Racing	Toyota	90	52
3	7	20	Christopher Bell	Joe Gibbs Racing	Toyota	90	43
4	6	16	A. J. Allmendinger	Kaulig Racing	Chevrolet	90	45
5	4	54	Ty Gibbs (R)	Joe Gibbs Racing	Toyota	90	47
6	19	19	Martin Truex Jr.	Joe Gibbs Racing	Toyota	90	31
7	13	17	Chris Buescher	RFK Racing	Ford	90	30
8	8	45	Tyler Reddick	23XI Racing	Toyota	90	30
9	23	12	Ryan Blaney	Team Penske	Ford	90	28
10	11	22	Joey Logano	Team Penske	Ford	90	27
11	25	38	Todd Gilliland	Front Row Motorsports	Ford	90	26
12	12	23	Bubba Wallace	23XI Racing	Toyota	90	30
13	28	47	Ricky Stenhouse Jr.	JTG Daugherty Racing	Chevrolet	90	24
14	9	8	Kyle Busch	Richard Childress Racing	Chevrolet	90	28
15	24	6	Brad Keselowski	RFK Racing	Ford	90	22
16	17	2	Austin Cindric	Team Penske	Ford	90	21
17	30	41	Ryan Preece	Stewart-Haas Racing	Ford	90	20
18	22	1	Ross Chastain	Trackhouse Racing	Chevrolet	90	19
19	21	42	Mike Rockenfeller	Legacy Motor Club	Chevrolet	90	18
20	10	7	Corey LaJoie	Spire Motorsports	Chevrolet	90	17
21	33	4	Kevin Harvick	Stewart-Haas Racing	Ford	90	16
22	14	99	Daniel Suárez	Trackhouse Racing	Chevrolet	90	15
23	18	48	Alex Bowman	Hendrick Motorsports	Chevrolet	90	14
24	20	31	Justin Haley	Kaulig Racing	Chevrolet	90	13
25	29	15	Andy Lally	Rick Ware Racing	Ford	90	12
26	5	5	Kyle Larson	Hendrick Motorsports	Chevrolet	90	23
27	35	78	Josh Bilicki (i)	Live Fast Motorsports	Chevrolet	90	0
28	34	51	Cole Custer (i)	Rick Ware Racing	Ford	90	0
29	31	43	Erik Jones	Legacy Motor Club	Chevrolet	90	8
30	27	10	Aric Almirola	Stewart-Haas Racing	Ford	90	7
31	16	3	Austin Dillon	Richard Childress Racing	Chevrolet	90	7
32	15	9	Chase Elliott	Hendrick Motorsports	Chevrolet	89	9
33	32	21	Harrison Burton	Wood Brothers Racing	Ford	89	4
34	36	77	Ty Dillon	Spire Motorsports	Chevrolet	89	3
35	26	14	Chase Briscoe	Stewart-Haas Racing	Ford	83	2
36	3	34	Michael McDowell	Front Row Motorsports	Ford	74	11
Official race results

=== Race statistics ===
- Lead changes: 6 among 5 different drivers
- Cautions/Laps: 1 for 4 laps
- Red flags: 0
- Time of race: 1 hours, 58 minutes, and 44 seconds
- Average speed: 111.426 miles per hour (179.323 km/h)

== Media ==
=== Television ===
USA covered the race on the television side. as part of a Radio style Broadcast for the race. Rick Allen and Steve Letarte called the race from the broadcast booth. MRN broadcaster Mike Bagley called the race from the Esses, Dale Earnhardt Jr. had the call from Turn 5, and Jeff Burton had the call from a platform located off Turn 10 that covers Turns 6–7. Marty Snider, Kim Coon, and Dillon Welch handled the pit road duties from pit lane.

USA
Booth announcers	Turn Announcers	Pit reporters
Lap-by-lap: Rick Allen; Color-commentator: Steve Letarte	Esses Announcer: Mike Bagley; Turn 5 Announcer: Dale Earnhardt Jr. Turn 6–7 Announcer: Jeff Burton	Marty Snider; Kim Coon; Dillon Welch

=== Radio ===
Motor Racing Network had the radio call for the race, which was also simulcast on Sirius XM NASCAR Radio. Alex Hayden, Jeff Striegle, and former crew chief Todd Gordon covered the action when the field raced down the front straightaway. Dave Moody called the race when the field raced thru the esses. Kyle Rickey covered the action when the field raced thru the inner loop and turn 5 and Dan Hubbard covered the action in turn 6 & 7. Steve Post, Brienne Pedigo and Chris Wilner called the action from the pits for MRN.

MRN
Booth announcers	Turn announcers	Pit reporters
Lead announcer: Alex Hayden; Announcer: Jeff Striegle; Announcer: Todd Gordon	Esses: Dave Moody; Inner loop & Turn 5: Kyle Rickey; Turn 6 & 7: Dan Hubbard	Steve Post; Brienne Pedigo; Chris Wilner

== Standings after the race ==
Drivers' Championship standings

	Pos	Driver	Points
	1	Martin Truex Jr.	861
	2	Denny Hamlin	822 (–39)
	3	William Byron	785 (–76)
	4	Christopher Bell	752 (–109)
	5	Kyle Larson	721 (–140)
2	6	Brad Keselowski	697 (–164)
3	7	Chris Buescher	695 (–166)
1	8	Ross Chastain	695 (–166)
	9	Ryan Blaney	694 (–167)
4	10	Kevin Harvick	693 (–168)
	11	Kyle Busch	688 (–173)
	12	Tyler Reddick	683 (–178)
	13	Joey Logano	666 (–195)
	14	Bubba Wallace	590 (–271)
1	15	Ricky Stenhouse Jr.	566 (–295)
1	16	Ty Gibbs	558 (–303)
Official driver's standings

Manufacturers' Championship standings

Pos	Manufacturer	Points
1	Chevrolet	927
2	Toyota	867 (–60)
3	Ford	855 (–72)

- Note: Only the first 16 positions are included for the driver standings.
- . – Driver has clinched a position in the NASCAR Cup Series playoffs.

Previous race: 2023 Verizon 200 at the Brickyard	NASCAR Cup Series; 2023 season	Next race: 2023 Coke Zero Sugar 400
