= 2023 Coke Zero Sugar 400 =

NASCAR Cup Series race

Race details
- Race 26 of 36 in the 2023 NASCAR Cup Series
- Date: August 26, 2023
- Location: Daytona International Speedway in Daytona Beach, Florida
- Course: Permanent racing facility
- Course length: 2.5 miles (4 km)
- Distance: 163 laps, 407.5 mi (652 km)
- Scheduled distance: 160 laps, 400 mi (640 km)
- Average speed: 158.389 miles per hour (254.902 km/h)

Pole position
| Driver | Chase Briscoe | Stewart-Haas Racing |
- Time: 49.499

Most laps led
| Driver | Chase Briscoe | Stewart-Haas Racing |
- Laps: 67

Winner
| No. 17 | Chris Buescher | RFK Racing |

Television in the United States
- Network: NBC
- Announcers: Rick Allen, Jeff Burton, Steve Letarte and Dale Earnhardt Jr.

Radio in the United States
- Radio: MRN
- Booth announcers: Alex Hayden, Jeff Striegle and Rusty Wallace
- Turn announcers: Dave Moody (1 & 2), Mike Bagley (Backstretch) and Jason Toy (3 & 4)

The 2023 Coke Zero Sugar 400 was a NASCAR Cup Series race held on August 26, 2023, at Daytona International Speedway in Daytona Beach, Florida. Contested over 163 laps—extended from 160 laps due to an overtime finish, on the 2.5-mile (4.0 km) superspeedway, it was the 26th race of the 2023 NASCAR Cup Series season, and the final race of the regular season before the playoffs. The race was also notably pre-empted on various NBC stations in several markets including Orlando, Florida (the home market for the race) and Oklahoma City, Oklahoma on CW affiliates WKCF and KAUT-TV, Albany, New York and Denver, Colorado MyNetworkTV affiliates WNYA and KTVD, and Baltimore, Maryland and Harrisburg, Pennsylvania MeTV affiliates WGAL and WBAL due to broadcasts of NFL football pre-season games with New York City and Washington, DC NBC stations WNBC and WRC-TV airing the race after their coverage on NFL pre-season games had concluded.

== Report ==
=== Background ===
Daytona International Speedway, the site of the race.

The race was held at Daytona International Speedway, a race track located in Daytona Beach, Florida, United States. Since its opening in 1959, the track has been the home of the Daytona 500, the most prestigious race in NASCAR. In addition to NASCAR, the track also hosts ARCA, AMA Superbike, USCC, SCCA, and Motocross races. It features multiple layouts including the primary 2.5 miles (4.0 km) high speed tri-oval, a 3.56 miles (5.73 km) sports car course, a 2.95 miles (4.75 km) motorcycle course, and a .25 miles (0.40 km) karting and motorcycle flat-track. The track's 180-acre (73 ha) infield includes the 29-acre (12 ha) Lake Lloyd, which has hosted powerboat racing. The speedway is owned and operated by International Speedway Corporation.

The track was built in 1959 by NASCAR founder William "Bill" France, Sr. to host racing held at the former Daytona Beach Road Course. His banked design permitted higher speeds and gave fans a better view of the cars. Lights were installed around the track in 1998 and today, it is the third-largest single lit outdoor sports facility. The speedway has been renovated three times, with the infield renovated in 2004 and the track repaved twice — in 1978 and in 2010. On January 22, 2013, the track unveiled artist depictions of a renovated speedway. On July 5 of that year, ground was broken for a project that would remove the backstretch seating and completely redevelop the frontstretch seating. The renovation to the speedway was done by Rossetti Architects. The project, named "Daytona Rising", was completed in January 2016, at a cost of US $400 million, placing emphasis on improving fan experience with five expanded and redesigned fan entrances (called "injectors") as well as wider and more comfortable seating with more restrooms and concession stands. After the renovations, the track's grandstands included 101,000 permanent seats with the ability to increase permanent seating to 125,000. The project was completed before the start of Speedweeks.

Before the race, Kurt Busch, who had not race since the 2022 Ambetter 301, announced he was retiring from full-time racing, as he suffered a concussion the following week at Pocono.

==== Entry list ====
- (R) denotes rookie driver.
- (i) denotes the driver ineligible for series driver points.

| No. | Driver | Team | Manufacturer |
|---|---|---|---|
| 1 | Ross Chastain | Trackhouse Racing | Chevrolet |
| 2 | Austin Cindric | Team Penske | Ford |
| 3 | Austin Dillon | Richard Childress Racing | Chevrolet |
| 4 | Kevin Harvick | Stewart-Haas Racing | Ford |
| 5 | Kyle Larson | Hendrick Motorsports | Chevrolet |
| 6 | Brad Keselowski | RFK Racing | Ford |
| 7 | Corey LaJoie | Spire Motorsports | Chevrolet |
| 8 | Kyle Busch | Richard Childress Racing | Chevrolet |
| 9 | Chase Elliott | Hendrick Motorsports | Chevrolet |
| 10 | Aric Almirola | Stewart-Haas Racing | Ford |
| 11 | Denny Hamlin | Joe Gibbs Racing | Toyota |
| 12 | Ryan Blaney | Team Penske | Ford |
| 13 | Chandler Smith (i) | Kaulig Racing | Chevrolet |
| 14 | Chase Briscoe | Stewart-Haas Racing | Ford |
| 15 | Brennan Poole (i) | Rick Ware Racing | Ford |
| 16 | A. J. Allmendinger | Kaulig Racing | Chevrolet |
| 17 | Chris Buescher | RFK Racing | Ford |
| 19 | Martin Truex Jr. | Joe Gibbs Racing | Toyota |
| 20 | Christopher Bell | Joe Gibbs Racing | Toyota |
| 21 | Harrison Burton | Wood Brothers Racing | Ford |
| 22 | Joey Logano | Team Penske | Ford |
| 23 | Bubba Wallace | 23XI Racing | Toyota |
| 24 | William Byron | Hendrick Motorsports | Chevrolet |
| 31 | Justin Haley | Kaulig Racing | Chevrolet |
| 34 | Michael McDowell | Front Row Motorsports | Ford |
| 36 | Riley Herbst (i) | Front Row Motorsports | Ford |
| 38 | Todd Gilliland | Front Row Motorsports | Ford |
| 41 | Ryan Preece | Stewart-Haas Racing | Ford |
| 42 | Josh Berry (i) | Legacy Motor Club | Chevrolet |
| 43 | Erik Jones | Legacy Motor Club | Chevrolet |
| 45 | Tyler Reddick | 23XI Racing | Toyota |
| 47 | Ricky Stenhouse Jr. | JTG Daugherty Racing | Chevrolet |
| 48 | Alex Bowman | Hendrick Motorsports | Chevrolet |
| 51 | J. J. Yeley (i) | Rick Ware Racing | Ford |
| 54 | Ty Gibbs (R) | Joe Gibbs Racing | Toyota |
| 62 | Austin Hill (i) | Beard Motorsports | Chevrolet |
| 77 | Ty Dillon | Spire Motorsports | Chevrolet |
| 78 | B. J. McLeod | Live Fast Motorsports | Chevrolet |
| 99 | Daniel Suárez | Trackhouse Racing | Chevrolet |
Official entry list

== Qualifying ==
Chase Briscoe scored the pole for the race with a time 49.499 of and a speed of 181.822 mph (292.614 km/h).

=== Qualifying results ===
| Pos | No. | Driver | Team | Manufacturer | R1 | R2 |
|---|---|---|---|---|---|---|
| 1 | 14 | Chase Briscoe | Stewart-Haas Racing | Ford | 49.526 | 49.499 |
| 2 | 10 | Aric Almirola | Stewart-Haas Racing | Ford | 49.728 | 49.534 |
| 3 | 21 | Harrison Burton | Wood Brothers Racing | Ford | 49.705 | 49.613 |
| 4 | 23 | Bubba Wallace | 23XI Racing | Toyota | 49.678 | 49.639 |
| 5 | 54 | Ty Gibbs (R) | Joe Gibbs Racing | Toyota | 49.687 | 49.642 |
| 6 | 36 | Riley Herbst (i) | Front Row Motorsports | Ford | 49.683 | 49.648 |
| 7 | 5 | Kyle Larson | Hendrick Motorsports | Chevrolet | 49.698 | 49.654 |
| 8 | 12 | Ryan Blaney | Team Penske | Ford | 49.738 | 49.709 |
| 9 | 41 | Ryan Preece | Stewart-Haas Racing | Ford | 49.813 | 49.741 |
| 10 | 4 | Kevin Harvick | Stewart-Haas Racing | Ford | 49.808 | 49.772 |
| 11 | 17 | Chris Buescher | RFK Racing | Ford | 49.852 | — |
| 12 | 6 | Brad Keselowski | RFK Racing | Ford | 49.876 | — |
| 13 | 19 | Martin Truex Jr. | Joe Gibbs Racing | Toyota | 49.892 | — |
| 14 | 22 | Joey Logano | Team Penske | Ford | 49.922 | — |
| 15 | 20 | Christopher Bell | Joe Gibbs Racing | Toyota | 49.928 | — |
| 16 | 2 | Austin Cindric | Team Penske | Ford | 49.943 | — |
| 17 | 16 | A. J. Allmendinger | Kaulig Racing | Chevrolet | 49.951 | — |
| 18 | 8 | Kyle Busch | Richard Childress Racing | Chevrolet | 49.953 | — |
| 19 | 11 | Denny Hamlin | Joe Gibbs Racing | Toyota | 49.962 | — |
| 20 | 45 | Tyler Reddick | 23XI Racing | Toyota | 49.987 | — |
| 21 | 3 | Austin Dillon | Richard Childress Racing | Chevrolet | 50.053 | — |
| 22 | 99 | Daniel Suárez | Trackhouse Racing | Chevrolet | 50.055 | — |
| 23 | 9 | Chase Elliott | Hendrick Motorsports | Chevrolet | 50.079 | — |
| 24 | 43 | Erik Jones | Legacy Motor Club | Chevrolet | 50.102 | — |
| 25 | 1 | Ross Chastain | Trackhouse Racing | Chevrolet | 50.108 | — |
| 26 | 62 | Austin Hill (i) | Beard Motorsports | Chevrolet | 50.206 | — |
| 27 | 24 | William Byron | Hendrick Motorsports | Chevrolet | 50.231 | — |
| 28 | 31 | Justin Haley | Kaulig Racing | Chevrolet | 50.253 | — |
| 29 | 42 | Josh Berry (i) | Legacy Motor Club | Chevrolet | 50.272 | — |
| 30 | 77 | Ty Dillon | Spire Motorsports | Chevrolet | 50.320 | — |
| 31 | 48 | Alex Bowman | Hendrick Motorsports | Chevrolet | 50.355 | — |
| 32 | 47 | Ricky Stenhouse Jr. | JTG Daugherty Racing | Chevrolet | 50.382 | — |
| 33 | 51 | J. J. Yeley (i) | Rick Ware Racing | Ford | 50.411 | — |
| 34 | 15 | Brennan Poole (i) | Rick Ware Racing | Ford | 50.415 | — |
| 35 | 38 | Todd Gilliland | Front Row Motorsports | Ford | 50.421 | — |
| 36 | 13 | Chandler Smith (i) | Kaulig Racing | Chevrolet | 50.432 | — |
| 37 | 7 | Corey LaJoie | Spire Motorsports | Chevrolet | 50.474 | — |
| 38 | 78 | B. J. McLeod | Live Fast Motorsports | Chevrolet | 50.597 | — |
| 39 | 34 | Michael McDowell | Front Row Motorsports | Ford | 50.712 | — |
Official qualifying results

== Race ==
RFK Racing finished 1-2 during the race, with the No. 17 winning, but the team's triumph was overshadowed by two massive wrecks.

Right before the end of Stage 2, Christopher Bell turned his teammate Ty Gibbs into the rear of Ryan Blaney which sent Blaney head on into the outside wall at nearly full speed, triggering a massive pileup that collected the latter two drivers, as well as several others including Austin Cindric, Austin Dillon, Kevin Harvick, Kyle Larson, Denny Hamlin, Brennan Poole, A. J. Allmendinger, Harrison Burton, Riley Herbst, Tyler Reddick, and Ricky Stenhouse Jr.

Later on, during lap 155, Ryan Preece's No. 41 Ford was spun around after getting rear ended by Erik Jones on the backstretch where Preece's car turned left into his teammate Chase Briscoe and the two went spinning in the infield grass. Preece's car caught air and subsequently went barrel rolling 10 times in the infield grass before coming to a rest on all four tires. Preece walked out a few minutes later under his own power and was placed on a stretcher and taken into an ambulance. After the race was over, Preece was transported to a nearby hospital for further evaluation, from which he was released the next morning. This was the third time a Next Gen car flipped over and the second at Daytona, after Harrison Burton's flip in the 2022 Daytona 500. Preece would race in the next race at Darlington. He revealed in his interviews the following race at Darlington that he had two black and bloodshot eyes as a result from the wreck. The car was taken back to the NASCAR Research and Development center to be studied. Safety concerns emerged on social media following the race as film of the crash showed that the roof hatch, designed to allow the driver to escape from the car through a method other than via the driver's side window, was detached from the car early in the crash, exposing the cockpit during the remainder of the crash.

=== Race results ===
==== Stage results ====
Stage One Laps: 35

| Pos | No | Driver | Team | Manufacturer | Points |
|---|---|---|---|---|---|
| 1 | 19 | Martin Truex Jr. | Joe Gibbs Racing | Toyota | 10 |
| 2 | 20 | Christopher Bell | Joe Gibbs Racing | Toyota | 9 |
| 3 | 4 | Kevin Harvick | Stewart-Haas Racing | Ford | 8 |
| 4 | 54 | Ty Gibbs (R) | Joe Gibbs Racing | Toyota | 7 |
| 5 | 22 | Joey Logano | Team Penske | Ford | 6 |
| 6 | 23 | Bubba Wallace | 23XI Racing | Toyota | 5 |
| 7 | 2 | Austin Cindric | Team Penske | Ford | 4 |
| 8 | 11 | Denny Hamlin | Joe Gibbs Racing | Toyota | 3 |
| 9 | 99 | Daniel Suárez | Trackhouse Racing | Chevrolet | 2 |
| 10 | 14 | Chase Briscoe | Stewart-Haas Racing | Ford | 1 |
Official stage one results

Stage Two Laps: 60

| Pos | No | Driver | Team | Manufacturer | Points |
|---|---|---|---|---|---|
| 1 | 6 | Brad Keselowski | RFK Racing | Ford | 10 |
| 2 | 8 | Kyle Busch | Richard Childress Racing | Chevrolet | 9 |
| 3 | 99 | Daniel Suárez | Trackhouse Racing | Chevrolet | 8 |
| 4 | 48 | Alex Bowman | Hendrick Motorsports | Chevrolet | 7 |
| 5 | 24 | William Byron | Hendrick Motorsports | Chevrolet | 6 |
| 6 | 45 | Tyler Reddick | 23XI Racing | Toyota | 5 |
| 7 | 9 | Chase Elliott | Hendrick Motorsports | Chevrolet | 4 |
| 8 | 3 | Austin Dillon | Richard Childress Racing | Chevrolet | 3 |
| 9 | 1 | Ross Chastain | Trackhouse Racing | Chevrolet | 2 |
| 10 | 22 | Joey Logano | Team Penske | Ford | 1 |
Official stage two results

=== Final Stage results ===
Stage Three Laps: 65

| Pos | Grid | No | Driver | Team | Manufacturer | Laps | Points |
|---|---|---|---|---|---|---|---|
| 1 | 11 | 17 | Chris Buescher | RFK Racing | Ford | 163 | 40 |
| 2 | 12 | 6 | Brad Keselowski | RFK Racing | Ford | 163 | 45 |
| 3 | 2 | 10 | Aric Almirola | Stewart-Haas Racing | Ford | 163 | 34 |
| 4 | 23 | 9 | Chase Elliott | Hendrick Motorsports | Chevrolet | 163 | 37 |
| 5 | 14 | 22 | Joey Logano | Team Penske | Ford | 163 | 39 |
| 6 | 31 | 48 | Alex Bowman | Hendrick Motorsports | Chevrolet | 163 | 38 |
| 7 | 18 | 8 | Kyle Busch | Richard Childress Racing | Chevrolet | 163 | 39 |
| 8 | 27 | 24 | William Byron | Hendrick Motorsports | Chevrolet | 163 | 35 |
| 9 | 10 | 4 | Kevin Harvick | Stewart-Haas Racing | Ford | 163 | 36 |
| 10 | 37 | 7 | Corey LaJoie | Spire Motorsports | Chevrolet | 163 | 27 |
| 11 | 30 | 77 | Ty Dillon | Spire Motorsports | Chevrolet | 163 | 26 |
| 12 | 4 | 23 | Bubba Wallace | 23XI Racing | Toyota | 163 | 30 |
| 13 | 39 | 34 | Michael McDowell | Front Row Motorsports | Ford | 163 | 24 |
| 14 | 26 | 62 | Austin Hill (i) | Beard Motorsports | Chevrolet | 163 | 0 |
| 15 | 36 | 13 | Chandler Smith (i) | Kaulig Racing | Chevrolet | 163 | 0 |
| 16 | 15 | 20 | Christopher Bell | Joe Gibbs Racing | Toyota | 163 | 30 |
| 17 | 25 | 1 | Ross Chastain | Trackhouse Racing | Chevrolet | 163 | 22 |
| 18 | 24 | 43 | Erik Jones | Legacy Motor Club | Chevrolet | 163 | 19 |
| 19 | 33 | 51 | J. J. Yeley (i) | Rick Ware Racing | Ford | 163 | 0 |
| 20 | 22 | 99 | Daniel Suárez | Trackhouse Racing | Chevrolet | 163 | 27 |
| 21 | 28 | 31 | Justin Haley | Kaulig Racing | Chevrolet | 163 | 16 |
| 22 | 29 | 42 | Josh Berry (i) | Legacy Motor Club | Chevrolet | 163 | 0 |
| 23 | 38 | 78 | B. J. McLeod | Live Fast Motorsports | Chevrolet | 163 | 14 |
| 24 | 13 | 19 | Martin Truex Jr. | Joe Gibbs Racing | Toyota | 163 | 23 |
| 25 | 20 | 45 | Tyler Reddick | 23XI Racing | Toyota | 163 | 17 |
| 26 | 19 | 11 | Denny Hamlin | Joe Gibbs Racing | Toyota | 162 | 14 |
| 27 | 7 | 5 | Kyle Larson | Hendrick Motorsports | Chevrolet | 161 | 10 |
| 28 | 3 | 21 | Harrison Burton | Wood Brothers Racing | Ford | 160 | 9 |
| 29 | 17 | 16 | A. J. Allmendinger | Kaulig Racing | Chevrolet | 160 | 8 |
| 30 | 1 | 14 | Chase Briscoe | Stewart-Haas Racing | Ford | 156 | 8 |
| 31 | 9 | 41 | Ryan Preece | Stewart-Haas Racing | Ford | 155 | 6 |
| 32 | 35 | 38 | Todd Gilliland | Front Row Motorsports | Ford | 131 | 5 |
| 33 | 21 | 3 | Austin Dillon | Richard Childress Racing | Chevrolet | 102 | 7 |
| 34 | 32 | 47 | Ricky Stenhouse Jr. | JTG Daugherty Racing | Chevrolet | 96 | 3 |
| 35 | 5 | 54 | Ty Gibbs (R) | Joe Gibbs Racing | Toyota | 94 | 9 |
| 36 | 8 | 12 | Ryan Blaney | Team Penske | Ford | 94 | 1 |
| 37 | 16 | 2 | Austin Cindric | Team Penske | Ford | 94 | 5 |
| 38 | 6 | 36 | Riley Herbst (i) | Front Row Motorsports | Ford | 94 | 0 |
| 39 | 34 | 15 | Brennan Poole (i) | Rick Ware Racing | Ford | 93 | 0 |
Official race results

=== Race statistics ===
- Lead changes: 22 among 17 different drivers
- Cautions/Laps: 3 for 18 laps
- Red flags: 1 for 9 minutes, 28 seconds
- Time of race: 2 hours, 34 minutes, and 22 seconds
- Average speed: 158.389 miles per hour (254.902 km/h)

== Media ==
=== Television ===
NBC Sports covered the race on the television side. Rick Allen, 2000 Coke Zero 400 winner Jeff Burton, Steve Letarte and two-time Coke Zero 400 winner Dale Earnhardt Jr. called the race from the broadcast booth. Dave Burns, Parker Kligerman, and Marty Snider handled the pit road duties from pit lane.

NBC
| Booth announcers | Pit reporters |
|---|---|
| Lap-by-lap: Rick Allen; Color-commentator: Jeff Burton; Color-commentator: Steve Letarte; Color-commentator: Dale Earnhardt Jr. | Dave Burns; Parker Kligerman; Marty Snider |

=== Radio ===
MRN had the radio call for the race, which was also simulcast on Sirius XM NASCAR Radio. Alex Hayden, Jeff Striegle, and 1989 NASCAR Cup Series Champion Rusty Wallace called the action for MRN when the field races thru the front straightaway. Dave Moody called the action for MRN from atop the Sunoco tower outside the exit of turn 2 when the field races thru turns 1 & 2. Mike Bagley worked the Daytona Backstretch for MRN from a spotter's stand in the inside of the track. Jason Toy worked the action for MRN when the field races thru turns 3 & 4. Pit road was operated by lead pit reporter Steve Post, Kim Coon, Alex Weaver, and Brienne Pedigo.

MRN Radio
| Booth announcers | Turn announcers | Pit reporters |
|---|---|---|
| Lead announcer: Alex Hayden; Announcer: Jeff Striegle; Announcer: Rusty Wallace | Turns 1 & 2: Dave Moody; Backstretch: Mike Bagley; Turns 3 & 4: Jason Toy | Steve Post; Kim Coon; Alex Weaver; Brienne Pedigo |

== Standings after the race ==
Drivers' Championship standings after Playoffs reset

| | Pos | Driver | Points |
|---|---|---|---|
| 2 | 1 | William Byron | 2,036 |
| 1 | 2 | Martin Truex Jr. | 2,036 (–0) |
| 1 | 3 | Denny Hamlin | 2,025 (–11) |
| 3 | 4 | Chris Buescher | 2,021 (–15) |
| 6 | 5 | Kyle Busch | 2,019 (–17) |
| 1 | 6 | Kyle Larson | 2,017 (–19) |
| 3 | 7 | Christopher Bell | 2,014 (–22) |
| | 8 | Ross Chastain | 2,011 (–25) |
| 3 | 9 | Brad Keselowski | 2,010 (–26) |
| 2 | 10 | Tyler Reddick | 2,009 (–27) |
| 2 | 11 | Joey Logano | 2,008 (–28) |
| 3 | 12 | Ryan Blaney | 2,008 (–28) |
| 4 | 13 | Michael McDowell | 2,007 (–29) |
| 1 | 14 | Ricky Stenhouse Jr. | 2,005 (–31) |
| 5 | 15 | Kevin Harvick | 2,004 (–32) |
| 2 | 16 | Bubba Wallace | 2,000 (–36) |
Official driver's standings

Manufacturers' Championship standings

| | Pos | Manufacturer | Points |
|---|---|---|---|
| | 1 | Chevrolet | 960 |
| 1 | 2 | Ford | 895 (–65) |
| 1 | 3 | Toyota | 892 (–68) |

- Note: Only the first 16 positions are included for the driver standings.

| Previous race: 2023 Go Bowling at The Glen | NASCAR Cup Series; 2023 season | Next race: 2023 Cook Out Southern 500 |
