= Nepomucena Kostecka =

Polish actress

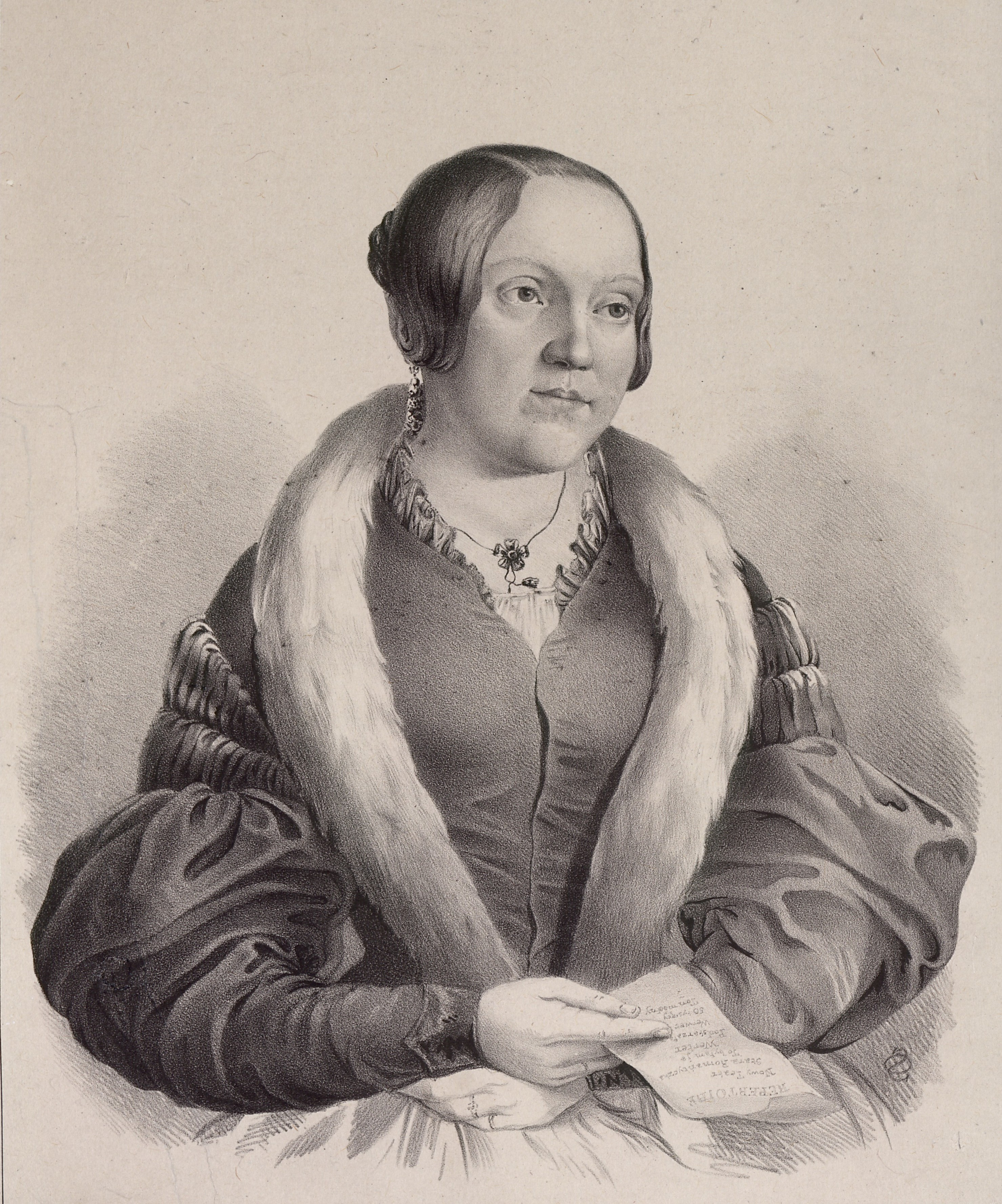
- Born: Nepomucena Żółkowska; 24 November 1807; Warsaw, Poland
- Died: 10 March 1847 (aged 39); Poland
- Spouse: Tomasz Kostecki

Nepomucena Kostecka, née Żółkowska (24 November 1807 – 10 March 1847) was a Polish stage actress. She was one of the leading stage actresses in Polish theatre during her life.

== Biography ==
Nepomucena Kostecka was the daughter of the comedian actor Fortunat Alojzy Gonzaga Żółkowski (1777–1822) and half-sister of the actors Alojzy Gonzaga Jazon Żółkowski and Lucjan Żółkowski. She debuted on 20 September 1829 and was active until 5 February 1847, a month before her death, when she played the part of a Jew in Rejci Station postal Hulczy. She performed in both Warsaw and Kraków.

She married the actor Tomasz Kostecki (occurring mainly in the chorus of the Warsaw Government Theatre) and had five children. According to the critic Jan Tomasz Seweryn Jasiński, she was an outstanding character actor, outstanding in higher comedy and free of exaggeration.
