= 2023 FireKeepers Casino 400 =

NASCAR Cup Series race

Race details
- Race 23 of 36 in the 2023 NASCAR Cup Series
- Date: August 6–7, 2023
- Location: Michigan International Speedway in Brooklyn, Michigan
- Course: Permanent racing facility
- Course length: 2.0 miles (3.2 km)
- Distance: 200 laps, 400 mi (640 km)
- Average speed: 131.159 miles per hour (211.080 km/h)

Pole position
Driver	Christopher Bell	Joe Gibbs Racing
- Time: 37.232

Most laps led
Driver	Chris Buescher	RFK Racing
- Laps: 52

Winner
No. 17	Chris Buescher	RFK Racing

Television in the United States
- Network: USA
- Announcers: Rick Allen, Jeff Burton, Steve Letarte, and Dale Earnhardt Jr.

Radio in the United States
- Radio: MRN
- Booth announcers: Alex Hayden and Jeff Striegle
- Turn announcers: Dave Moody (1–2) and Mike Bagley (3–4)

The 2023 FireKeepers Casino 400 was a NASCAR Cup Series race held on August 6 and 7, 2023, at Michigan International Speedway in Brooklyn, Michigan. Contested over 200 laps on the two-mile (3.2 km) D-shaped oval, it was the 23rd race of the 2023 NASCAR Cup Series season. The race began on Sunday, August 6, before rain delayed it to Monday, August 7, after 74 laps were complete.

== Report ==
=== Background ===
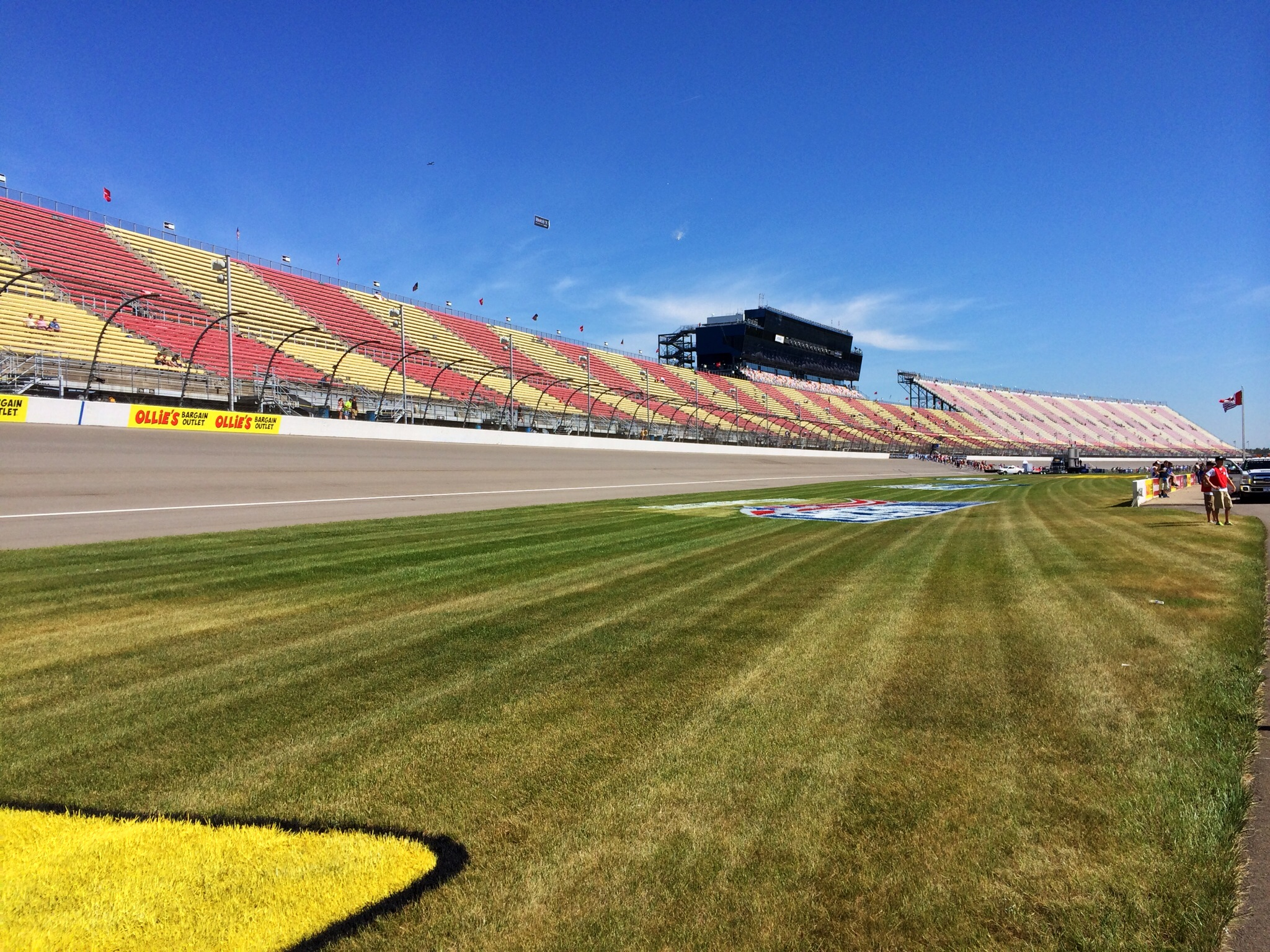
Michigan International Speedway, the track where the race was held.

The race was held at Michigan International Speedway, a two-mile (3.2 km) moderate-banked D-shaped speedway located in Brooklyn, Michigan. The track is used primarily for NASCAR events. It is known as a "sister track" to Texas World Speedway as MIS's oval design was a direct basis of TWS, with moderate modifications to the banking in the corners, and was used as the basis of Auto Club Speedway. The track is owned by International Speedway Corporation. Michigan International Speedway is recognized as one of motorsports' premier facilities because of its wide racing surface and high banking (by open-wheel standards; the 18-degree banking is modest by stock car standards).

==== Entry list ====
- (R) denotes rookie driver.
- (i) denotes the driver ineligible for series driver points.

No.	Driver	Team	Manufacturer
1	Ross Chastain	Trackhouse Racing	Chevrolet
2	Austin Cindric	Team Penske	Ford
3	Austin Dillon	Richard Childress Racing	Chevrolet
4	Kevin Harvick	Stewart-Haas Racing	Ford
5	Kyle Larson	Hendrick Motorsports	Chevrolet
6	Brad Keselowski	RFK Racing	Ford
7	Corey LaJoie	Spire Motorsports	Chevrolet
8	Kyle Busch	Richard Childress Racing	Chevrolet
9	Chase Elliott	Hendrick Motorsports	Chevrolet
10	Aric Almirola	Stewart-Haas Racing	Ford
11	Denny Hamlin	Joe Gibbs Racing	Toyota
12	Ryan Blaney	Team Penske	Ford
14	Chase Briscoe	Stewart-Haas Racing	Ford
15	J. J. Yeley (i)	Rick Ware Racing	Ford
16	A. J. Allmendinger	Kaulig Racing	Chevrolet
17	Chris Buescher	RFK Racing	Ford
19	Martin Truex Jr.	Joe Gibbs Racing	Toyota
20	Christopher Bell	Joe Gibbs Racing	Toyota
21	Harrison Burton	Wood Brothers Racing	Ford
22	Joey Logano	Team Penske	Ford
23	Bubba Wallace	23XI Racing	Toyota
24	William Byron	Hendrick Motorsports	Chevrolet
31	Justin Haley	Kaulig Racing	Chevrolet
34	Michael McDowell	Front Row Motorsports	Ford
38	Todd Gilliland	Front Row Motorsports	Ford
41	Ryan Preece	Stewart-Haas Racing	Ford
42	Josh Berry (i) (Note: Josh Berry replaced Noah Gragson after Gragson was suspended by Legacy Motor Club and NASCAR for liking an Instagram post related to the murder of George Floyd.)	Legacy Motor Club	Chevrolet
43	Erik Jones	Legacy Motor Club	Chevrolet
45	Tyler Reddick	23XI Racing	Toyota
47	Ricky Stenhouse Jr.	JTG Daugherty Racing	Chevrolet
48	Alex Bowman	Hendrick Motorsports	Chevrolet
51	Cole Custer (i)	Rick Ware Racing	Ford
54	Ty Gibbs (R)	Joe Gibbs Racing	Toyota
62	Austin Hill (i)	Beard Motorsports	Chevrolet
77	Ty Dillon	Spire Motorsports	Chevrolet
78	Josh Bilicki (i)	Live Fast Motorsports	Chevrolet
99	Daniel Suárez	Trackhouse Racing	Chevrolet
Official entry list

== Practice ==
Martin Truex Jr. was the fastest in the practice session with a time of 37.496 seconds and a speed of 192.020 mph (309.026 km/h).

=== Practice results ===
Pos	No.	Driver	Team	Manufacturer	Time	Speed
1	19	Martin Truex Jr.	Joe Gibbs Racing	Toyota	37.496	192.020
2	20	Christopher Bell	Joe Gibbs Racing	Toyota	37.503	191.985
3	24	William Byron	Hendrick Motorsports	Chevrolet	37.553	191.729
Official practice results

== Qualifying ==
Christopher Bell scored the pole for the race with a time of 37.232 and a speed of 193.382 mph (311.218 km/h).

=== Qualifying results ===
Pos	No.	Driver	Team	Manufacturer	R1	R2
1	20	Christopher Bell	Joe Gibbs Racing	Toyota	37.326	37.232
2	1	Ross Chastain	Trackhouse Racing	Chevrolet	37.267	37.259
3	54	Ty Gibbs (R)	Joe Gibbs Racing	Toyota	37.225	37.301
4	17	Chris Buescher	RFK Racing	Ford	37.329	37.321
5	19	Martin Truex Jr.	Joe Gibbs Racing	Toyota	37.329	37.372
6	22	Joey Logano	Team Penske	Ford	37.422	37.380
7	24	William Byron	Hendrick Motorsports	Chevrolet	37.451	37.479
8	8	Kyle Busch	Richard Childress Racing	Chevrolet	37.561	37.520
9	12	Ryan Blaney	Team Penske	Ford	37.620	37.544
10	9	Chase Elliott	Hendrick Motorsports	Chevrolet	37.521	37.548
11	23	Bubba Wallace	23XI Racing	Toyota	37.398	—
12	6	Brad Keselowski	RFK Racing	Ford	37.453	—
13	11	Denny Hamlin	Joe Gibbs Racing	Toyota	37.469	—
14	99	Daniel Suárez	Trackhouse Racing	Chevrolet	37.479	—
15	45	Tyler Reddick	23XI Racing	Toyota	37.567	—
16	3	Austin Dillon	Richard Childress Racing	Chevrolet	37.567	—
17	5	Kyle Larson	Hendrick Motorsports	Chevrolet	37.633	—
18	10	Aric Almirola	Stewart-Haas Racing	Ford	37.643	—
19	14	Chase Briscoe	Stewart-Haas Racing	Ford	37.651	—
20	48	Alex Bowman	Hendrick Motorsports	Chevrolet	37.652	—
21	2	Austin Cindric	Team Penske	Ford	37.653	—
22	4	Kevin Harvick	Stewart-Haas Racing	Ford	37.697	—
23	34	Michael McDowell	Front Row Motorsports	Ford	37.707	—
24	16	A. J. Allmendinger	Kaulig Racing	Chevrolet	37.720	—
25	43	Erik Jones	Legacy Motor Club	Chevrolet	37.721	—
26	31	Justin Haley	Kaulig Racing	Chevrolet	37.726	—
27	47	Ricky Stenhouse Jr.	JTG Daugherty Racing	Chevrolet	37.732	—
28	41	Ryan Preece	Stewart-Haas Racing	Ford	37.781	—
29	21	Harrison Burton	Wood Brothers Racing	Ford	37.891	—
30	62	Austin Hill (i)	Beard Motorsports	Chevrolet	37.906	—
31	7	Corey LaJoie	Spire Motorsports	Chevrolet	37.942	—
32	38	Todd Gilliland	Front Row Motorsports	Ford	38.205	—
33	51	Cole Custer (i)	Rick Ware Racing	Ford	38.486	—
34	77	Ty Dillon	Spire Motorsports	Chevrolet	38.573	—
35	42	Josh Berry (i)	Legacy Motor Club	Chevrolet	38.664	—
36	15	J. J. Yeley (i)	Rick Ware Racing	Ford	38.739	—
37	78	Josh Bilicki (i)	Live Fast Motorsports	Chevrolet	39.667	—
Official qualifying results

== Race ==
Martin Truex Jr. swept the stages, but Chris Buescher, driving for RFK Racing, would overtake him in the closing laps to win the race, marking the first time since 2010 where a Roush driver won consecutive Cup series races. Rounding out the top five would be Truex's JGR teammate Denny Hamlin, RFK's Brad Keselowski, and Kyle Larson of Hendrick Motorsports.

=== Race results ===
==== Stage results ====
Stage One Laps: 45

Pos	No	Driver	Team	Manufacturer	Points
1	19	Martin Truex Jr.	Joe Gibbs Racing	Toyota	10
2	23	Bubba Wallace	23XI Racing	Toyota	9
3	54	Ty Gibbs (R)	Joe Gibbs Racing	Toyota	8
4	6	Brad Keselowski	RFK Racing	Ford	7
5	5	Kyle Larson	Hendrick Motorsports	Chevrolet	6
6	99	Daniel Suárez	Trackhouse Racing	Chevrolet	5
7	48	Alex Bowman	Hendrick Motorsports	Chevrolet	4
8	11	Denny Hamlin	Joe Gibbs Racing	Toyota	3
9	43	Erik Jones	Legacy Motor Club	Chevrolet	2
10	7	Corey LaJoie	Spire Motorsprots	Chevrolet	1
Official stage one results

Stage Two Laps: 75

Pos	No	Driver	Team	Manufacturer	Points
1	19	Martin Truex Jr.	Joe Gibbs Racing	Toyota	10
2	99	Daniel Suárez	Trackhouse Racing	Chevrolet	9
3	6	Brad Keselowski	RFK Racing	Ford	8
4	23	Bubba Wallace	23XI Racing	Toyota	7
5	48	Alex Bowman	Hendrick Motorsports	Chevrolet	6
6	5	Kyle Larson	Hendrick Motorsports	Chevrolet	5
7	22	Joey Logano	Team Penske	Ford	4
8	16	A. J. Allmendinger	Kaulig Racing	Chevrolet	3
9	2	Austin Cindric	Team Penske	Ford	2
10	17	Chris Buescher	RFK Racing	Ford	1
Official stage two results

=== Final Stage results ===
Stage Three Laps: 80

Pos	Grid	No	Driver	Team	Manufacturer	Laps	Points
1	4	17	Chris Buescher	RFK Racing	Ford	200	41
2	5	19	Martin Truex Jr.	Joe Gibbs Racing	Toyota	200	55
3	13	11	Denny Hamlin	Joe Gibbs Racing	Toyota	200	37
4	12	6	Brad Keselowski	RFK Racing	Ford	200	48
5	17	5	Kyle Larson	Hendrick Motorsports	Chevrolet	200	43
6	14	99	Daniel Suárez	Trackhouse Racing	Chevrolet	200	36
7	2	1	Ross Chastain	Trackhouse Racing	Chevrolet	200	30
8	22	4	Kevin Harvick	Stewart-Haas Racing	Ford	200	29
9	9	12	Ryan Blaney	Team Penske	Ford	200	28
10	25	43	Erik Jones	Legacy Motor Club	Chevrolet	200	29
11	3	54	Ty Gibbs (R)	Joe Gibbs Racing	Toyota	200	34
12	21	2	Austin Cindric	Team Penske	Ford	200	27
13	1	20	Christopher Bell	Joe Gibbs Racing	Toyota	200	24
14	6	22	Joey Logano	Team Penske	Ford	200	27
15	31	7	Corey LaJoie	Spire Motorsports	Chevrolet	200	23
16	18	10	Aric Almirola	Stewart-Haas Racing	Ford	200	21
17	29	21	Harrison Burton	Wood Brothers Racing	Ford	200	20
18	11	23	Bubba Wallace	23XI Racing	Toyota	200	35
19	16	3	Austin Dillon	Richard Childress Racing	Chevrolet	200	18
20	34	77	Ty Dillon	Spire Motorsports	Chevrolet	200	17
21	27	47	Ricky Stenhouse Jr.	JTG Daugherty Racing	Chevrolet	200	16
22	28	41	Ryan Preece	Stewart-Haas Racing	Ford	199	15
23	26	31	Justin Haley	Kaulig Racing	Chevrolet	199	14
24	23	34	Michael McDowell	Front Row Motorsports	Ford	199	13
25	33	51	Cole Custer (i)	Rick Ware Racing	Ford	199	0
26	24	16	A. J. Allmendinger	Kaulig Racing	Chevrolet	199	14
27	36	15	J. J. Yeley (i)	Rick Ware Racing	Ford	199	0
28	30	62	Austin Hill (i)	Beard Motorsports	Chevrolet	198	0
29	32	38	Todd Gilliland	Front Row Motorsports	Ford	197	8
30	15	45	Tyler Reddick	23XI Racing	Toyota	197	7
31	19	14	Chase Briscoe	Stewart-Haas Racing	Ford	197	6
32	37	78	Josh Bilicki (i)	Live Fast Motorsports	Chevrolet	196	0
33	20	48	Alex Bowman	Hendrick Motorsports	Chevrolet	134	14
34	35	42	Josh Berry (i)	Legacy Motor Club	Chevrolet	50	0
35	7	24	William Byron	Hendrick Motorsports	Chevrolet	46	2
36	10	9	Chase Elliott	Hendrick Motorsports	Chevrolet	34	1
37	8	8	Kyle Busch	Richard Childress Racing	Chevrolet	14	1
Official race results

=== Race statistics ===
- Lead changes: 26 among 16 different drivers
- Cautions/Laps: 9 for 43 laps
- Red flags: 1 for 19 hours, 5 minutes, and 18 seconds
- Time of race: 3 hours, 2 minutes, and 59 seconds
- Average speed: 131.159 miles per hour (211.080 km/h)

== Media ==
=== Television ===
USA covered the race on the television side. Rick Allen, Jeff Burton, Steve Letarte and Dale Earnhardt Jr. called the race from the broadcast booth. Kim Coon, Parker Kligerman and Marty Snider handled the pit road duties from pit lane on Sunday. Kim Coon and Marty Snider handled the pit road duties on Monday.

USA
Booth announcers	Pit reporters
Lap-by-lap: Rick Allen; Color-commentator: Jeff Burton; Color-commentator: Steve Letarte; Color-commentator: Dale Earnhardt Jr.	Kim Coon (Sunday and Monday); Parker Kligerman (Sunday); Marty Snider (Sunday and Monday)

=== Radio ===
Radio coverage of the race was broadcast by Motor Racing Network (MRN) and simulcast on Sirius XM NASCAR Radio. Alex Hayden and Jeff Striegle called the race in the booth while the field was racing on the front stretch. Dave Moody called the race from a billboard outside of turn 2 when the field is racing through turns 1 and 2. Mike Bagley called the race from a platform outside of turn 3 when the field races through turns 3 and 4. Steve Post, Chris Wilner and Jason Toy worked pit road for the radio side.

MRN
Booth announcers	Turn announcers	Pit reporters
Lead announcer: Alex Hayden; Announcer: Jeff Striegle	Turns 1 & 2: Dave Moody; Turns 3 & 4: Mike Bagley	Steve Post; Chris Wilner; Jason Toy

== Standings after the race ==
Drivers' Championship standings

	Pos	Driver	Points
	1	Martin Truex Jr.	799
	2	Denny Hamlin	742 (–57)
	3	William Byron	703 (–96)
	4	Christopher Bell	677 (–122)
1	5	Kevin Harvick	663 (–136)
2	6	Kyle Larson	662 (–137)
	7	Ross Chastain	656 (–143)
3	8	Brad Keselowski	651 (–148)
4	9	Kyle Busch	649 (–150)
1	10	Ryan Blaney	642 (–157)
2	11	Chris Buescher	639 (–160)
2	12	Joey Logano	636 (–163)
1	13	Tyler Reddick	609 (–190)
1	14	Bubba Wallace	541 (–258)
1	15	Ricky Stenhouse Jr.	530 (–269)
1	16	Ty Gibbs	486 (–313)
Official driver's standings

Manufacturers' Championship standings

Pos	Manufacturer	Points
1	Chevrolet	852
2	Toyota	799 (–53)
3	Ford	784 (–68)

- Note: Only the first 16 positions are included for the driver standings.
- . – Driver has clinched a position in the NASCAR Cup Series playoffs.

== Notes ==
Previous race: 2023 Cook Out 400	NASCAR Cup Series; 2023 season	Next race: 2023 Verizon 200 at the Brickyard
