= Żółkiewski =

Lubicz coat of arms of the Żółkiewski family

Żółkiewski family (Polish: Żółkiewscy) is a Polish noble family of the Lubicz coat of arms. The name derives from the village of Żółkiew, now Żółkiewka, Lublin Voivodeship. Some heraldic and modern secondary sources attribute the family an earlier origin in Mazovia, from where it settled in the Chełm Land.

Notable people with the surname include:

- Stanisław Żółkiewski (1547-1620), hetman, Great Chancellor of the Crown
- Katarzyna Żółkiewska (died 1616), daughter of Stanisław Żółkiewski, wife of Stanisław Koniecpolski
- Zofia Żółkiewska (c. 1590–1634), daughter of Stanisław Żółkiewski, grandmother of King Jan III Sobieski.
- Stefan Żółkiewski (1911-1991), Polish communist

== See also ==
- Żółkowski
- Żółkowski
