= Alojzy Gonzaga Jazon Żółkowski =

Polish actor and singer

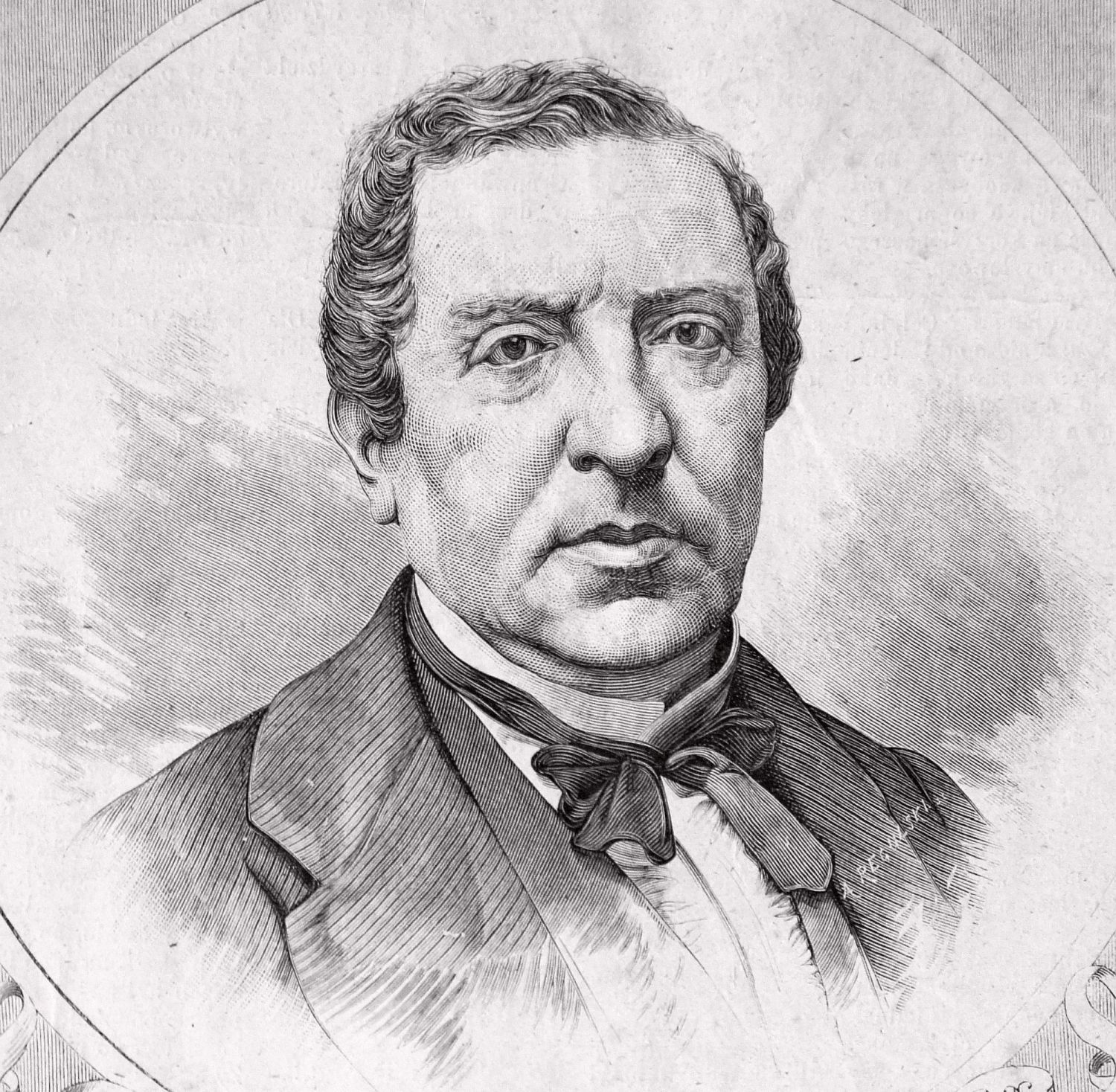
Alojzy Gonzaga Jazon Żółkowski

Alojzy Gonzaga Jazon Żółkowski, Ziółkowski (4 December 1814 – 25 November 1889) was a Polish actor and singer, one of the most prominent Polish comedians.

He was born and died in Warsaw, the son of Fortunat Alojzy Gonzaga Żółkowski and brother of Nepomucena Kostecka. He performed at Teatr Narodowy. His most notable roles are:

- Szambelan: Pan Jowialski (Aleksander Fredro)
- Szarucki: Majster i czeladnik (Józef Korzeniowski)
