= Eric Ziolkowski =

American philosopher

- Born: 1958 (age 67–68)

Education
- Education: University of Chicago (PhD)

Philosophical work
- Era: 21st-century philosophy
- Region: Western philosophy
- Institutions: Lafayette College
- Main interests: religion and literature; reception history of the Bible; comparative religion; history of Christianity; philosophy of religion

Eric Ziolkowski (born 1958) is an American philosopher and Helen H. P. Manson Professor Emeritus of Bible at Lafayette College. He is known for his works on history of Christianity and philosophy of religion.

== Books ==
- Religion and Literature: History and Method. Brill Research Perspectives in Religion and the Arts, vol. 3. Leiden: Brill, 2019.
- Kierkegaard, Literature, and the Arts. (Evanston, IL: Northwestern University Press, 2017)
- The Bible in Folklore Worldwide, 2 vols. (Berlin: De Gruyter, 2017). Vol. 1: A Handbook of Biblical Reception in Jewish, European Christian, and Islamic Folklores (2017); vol. 2: A Handbook of Biblical Reception in the Folklores of Africa, Asia, Oceania, and the Americas (2024)
- The Literary Kierkegaard (Evanston, IL: Northwestern University Press, 2011)
- Literature, Religion, and East/West Comparison: Essays in Honor of Anthony C. Yu (Newark: University of Delaware Press, 2005)
- Evil Children in Religion, Literature, and Art (Houndmills, Basingstoke, Hampshire: Palgrave, 2001)
- A Museum of Faiths: Histories and Legacies of the 1893 World’s Parliament of Religions (Atlanta, GA: Scholars Press, 1993; now Oxford: Oxford University Press)
- The Sanctification of Don Quixote: From Hidalgo to Priest (University Park: Pennsylvania State University Press, 1991)
