= Fortunat Alojzy Gonzaga Żółkowski =

A. Żółkowski

Fortunat Alojzy Gonzaga Żółkowski, Ziółkowski (2 November 1777 – 11 September 1822), was a Polish actor, comedist, adaptor, translator, editor of humour magazines, and head of a Polish theatrical family. He was born near Nowogródek (now Navahrudak, Belarus). He performed at Teatr Narodowy. He was the father of Alojzy Gonzaga Jazon Żółkowski and Nepomucena Kostecka.

He died in Warsaw.

== Notable roles ==
- Miechodmuch Cud mniemany, czyli Krakowiacy i górale
- Kartofel Gaweł na księżycu
- Lurwell Henryk VI na łowach
- Szafarz Tadeusz Chwalibóg
- Baron Kopciuszek
- Pustak Fircyk w zalotach
- Kopp Młodość Henryka V
- Don Bartolo Cyrulik sewilski (P. Beaumarchais)
- Polkwicer Nasze przedbiegi
- Lisiewicz Pan Geldhab (A. Fredro)
- main roles in Molière's Mieszczanin szlachcicem, Doktor z musu, Georges Dandin and Anzelm in Szkoła kobiet
