= YellaWood 500 =

Auto race held at Talladega, United States

NASCAR Cup Series
- Venue: Talladega Superspeedway
- Location: Lincoln, Alabama, United States
- Corporate sponsor: YellaWood
- First race: 1969
- Distance: 500.08 miles (804.801 km)
- Laps: 188; Stage 1: 98; Stages 2 & 3: 45 each
- Previous names: Talladega 500 (1969–1987); Talladega DieHard 500 (1988–1989); DieHard 500 (1990–1997); Winston 500 (1998–2000); EA Sports 500 (2001–2004); UAW-Ford 500 (2005–2007); AMP Energy 500 (2008–2009); AMP Energy Juice 500 (2010); Good Sam Club 500 (2011); Good Sam Roadside Assistance 500 (2012); Camping World RV Sales 500 (2013); GEICO 500 (2014); CampingWorld.com 500 at Talladega (2015); Hellmann's 500 (2016); Alabama 500 (2017); 1000Bulbs.com 500 (2018–2019)
- Most wins (driver): Dale Earnhardt (7)
- Most wins (team): Richard Childress Racing (8)
- Most wins (manufacturer): Chevrolet (24)

Circuit information
- Surface: Asphalt
- Length: 2.66 mi (4.28 km)
- Turns: 4

The YellaWood 500 is a NASCAR Cup Series stock car race held at Talladega Superspeedway in Lincoln, Alabama, hosting an event in The Chase. Kyle Larson is the defending race winner.

== History ==
Through 1996, this race was normally held in early August or late July. In 1997, it was moved to early October due to the uncomfortably hot summer temperatures, and sometimes unpredictable summertime thunderstorms in the Alabama area. In 2009, the race moved again, this time to November 1 as part of a realignment agreement with Atlanta and Fontana (where Fontana earned a race in the Chase and Atlanta gained the Labor Day weekend race).

In 1998, the name of the race was swapped with that of the Talladega spring race. The fall race became known as the Winston 500 for three years to promote the Winston No Bull 5 program.

Since then, the race has been sponsored by EA Sports, UAW-Ford, AMP Energy, Good Sam, GEICO, who later sponsored the spring race, CampingWorld.com, Hellmann's, and 1000Bulbs.com.

== Past winners ==
Year	Date	No.	Driver	Team	Manufacturer	Race distance		Race time	Average speed (mph)	Report	Ref
Year	Date	No.	Driver	Team	Manufacturer	Laps	Miles (km)	Race time	Average speed (mph)	Report	Ref
1969	September 14	99	Richard Brickhouse	Ray Nichels	Dodge	188	500.08 (804.8)	3:15:07	153.778	Report	
1970	August 23	40	Pete Hamilton	Petty Enterprises	Plymouth	188	500.08 (804.8)	3:09:17	158.517	Report	
1971	August 22	12	Bobby Allison	Holman-Moody	Mercury	188	500.08 (804.8)	3:25:38	145.945	Report	
1972	August 6	48	James Hylton	James Hylton	Mercury	188	500.08 (804.8)	3:22:09	148.728	Report	
1973	August 12	22	Dick Brooks	Crawford Brothers	Plymouth	188	500.08 (804.8)	3:26:17	145.454	Report	
1974	August 11	43	Richard Petty	Petty Enterprises	Dodge	188	500.08 (804.8)	3:21:52	148.637	Report	
1975	August 17	15	Buddy Baker	Bud Moore Engineering	Ford	188	500.08 (804.8)	3:49:14	130.892	Report	
1976	August 8	71	Dave Marcis	Nord Krauskopf	Dodge	188	500.08 (804.8)	3:10:27	157.547	Report	
1977	August 7	1	Donnie Allison*	Ellington Racing	Chevrolet	188	500.08 (804.8)	3:04:37	162.524	Report	
1978	August 6	54	Lennie Pond	Ranier-Lundy	Oldsmobile	188	500.08 (804.8)	2:51:43	174.7	Report	
1979	August 5	88	Darrell Waltrip	DiGard Motorsports	Oldsmobile	188	500.08 (804.8)	3:06:06	161.229	Report	
1980	August 3	21	Neil Bonnett	Wood Brothers Racing	Mercury	188	500.08 (804.8)	2:59:47	166.894	Report	
1981	August 2	47	Ron Bouchard	Race Hill Farm Team	Buick	188	500.08 (804.8)	3:11:24	156.737	Report	
1982	August 1	11	Darrell Waltrip	Junior Johnson & Associates	Buick	188	500.08 (804.8)	2:58:26	168.157	Report	
1983	July 31	15	Dale Earnhardt	Bud Moore Engineering	Ford	188	500.08 (804.8)	2:55:52	170.611	Report	
1984	July 29	3	Dale Earnhardt	Richard Childress Racing	Chevrolet	188	500.08 (804.8)	3:12:04	155.485	Report	
1985	July 28	28	Cale Yarborough	Ranier-Lundy	Ford	188	500.08 (804.8)	3:21:41	148.772	Report	
1986	July 27	8	Bobby Hillin Jr.	Stavola Brothers Racing	Buick	188	500.08 (804.8)	3:17:59	151.522	Report	
1987	July 26	9	Bill Elliott	Melling Racing	Ford	188	500.08 (804.8)	2:55:10	171.293	Report	
1988	July 31	25	Ken Schrader	Hendrick Motorsports	Chevrolet	188	500.08 (804.8)	3:14:12	154.505	Report	
1989	July 30	11	Terry Labonte	Junior Johnson & Associates	Ford	188	500.08 (804.8)	3:10:41	157.354	Report	
1990	July 29	3	Dale Earnhardt	Richard Childress Racing	Chevrolet	188	500.08 (804.8)	2:52:01	174.43	Report	
1991	July 28	3	Dale Earnhardt	Richard Childress Racing	Chevrolet	188	500.08 (804.8)	3:23:35	147.383	Report	
1992	July 26	4	Ernie Irvan	Morgan-McClure Motorsports	Chevrolet	188	500.08 (804.8)	3:05:11	176.309	Report	
1993	July 25	3	Dale Earnhardt	Richard Childress Racing	Chevrolet	188	500.08 (804.8)	3:15:01	153.858	Report	
1994	July 24	27	Jimmy Spencer	Junior Johnson & Associates	Ford	188	500.08 (804.8)	3:03:50	163.217	Report	
1995	July 23	4	Sterling Marlin	Morgan-McClure Motorsports	Chevrolet	188	500.08 (804.8)	2:53:15	173.188	Report	
1996	July 28	24	Jeff Gordon	Hendrick Motorsports	Chevrolet	129*	343.14 (552.23)	2:34:21	133.387	Report	
1997	October 12	5	Terry Labonte	Hendrick Motorsports	Chevrolet	188	500.08 (804.8)	3:11:36	156.601	Report	
1998	October 11	88	Dale Jarrett	Robert Yates Racing	Ford	188	500.08 (804.8)	3:08:20	159.318	Report	
1999	October 17	3	Dale Earnhardt	Richard Childress Racing	Chevrolet	188	500.08 (804.8)	3:00:04	166.632	Report	
2000	October 15	3	Dale Earnhardt*	Richard Childress Racing	Chevrolet	188	500.08 (804.8)	3:01:06	165.681	Report	
2001	October 21	8	Dale Earnhardt Jr.	Dale Earnhardt, Inc.	Chevrolet	188	500.08 (804.8)	3:02:45	164.185	Report	
2002	October 6	8	Dale Earnhardt Jr.	Dale Earnhardt, Inc.	Chevrolet	188	500.08 (804.8)	2:43:22	183.665	Report	
2003	September 28	15	Michael Waltrip	Dale Earnhardt, Inc.	Chevrolet	188	500.08 (804.8)	3:12:17	156.045	Report	
2004	October 3	8	Dale Earnhardt Jr.	Dale Earnhardt, Inc.	Chevrolet	188	500.08 (804.8)	3:11:12	156.929	Report	
2005	October 2	88	Dale Jarrett	Robert Yates Racing	Ford	190*	505.4 (813.362)	3:30:51	143.818	Report	
2006	October 8	25	Brian Vickers	Hendrick Motorsports	Chevrolet	188	500.08 (804.8)	3:10:23	157.602	Report	
2007	October 7	24	Jeff Gordon	Hendrick Motorsports	Chevrolet	188	500.08 (804.8)	3:29:11	143.438	Report	
2008	October 5	20	Tony Stewart	Joe Gibbs Racing	Toyota	190*	505.4 (813.362)	3:36:10	140.281	Report	
2009	November 1	26	Jamie McMurray	Roush Fenway Racing	Ford	191*	508.06 (817.643)	3:13:54	157.213	Report	
2010	October 31	33	Clint Bowyer	Richard Childress Racing	Chevrolet	188	500.08 (804.8)	3:03:23	163.618	Report	
2011	October 23	33	Clint Bowyer	Richard Childress Racing	Chevrolet	189*	502.74 (809.081)	3:29:14	143.404	Report	
2012	October 7	17	Matt Kenseth	Roush Fenway Racing	Ford	189*	502.74 (809.081)	2:56:12	171.194	Report	
2013	October 20	1	Jamie McMurray	Earnhardt Ganassi Racing	Chevrolet	188	500.08 (804.8)	2:47:49	178.795	Report	
2014	October 19	2	Brad Keselowski	Team Penske	Ford	194*	516.04 (830.485)	3:13:09	160.302	Report	
2015	October 25	22	Joey Logano	Team Penske	Ford	196*	521.36 (839.047)	3:06:56	167.311	Report	
2016	October 23	22	Joey Logano	Team Penske	Ford	192*	510.72 (821.924)	3:11:38	159.905	Report	
2017	October 15	2	Brad Keselowski	Team Penske	Ford	188	500.08 (804.8)	3:47:52	131.677	Report	
2018	October 14	10	Aric Almirola	Stewart–Haas Racing	Ford	193*	513.38 (826.04)	3:20:24	153.707	Report	
2019	October 13/14*	12	Ryan Blaney	Team Penske	Ford	188	500.08 (804.8)	3:39:35	136.644	Report	
2020	October 4	11	Denny Hamlin	Joe Gibbs Racing	Toyota	200*	532 (856)	4:05:58	129.774	Report	
2021	October 4*	23	Bubba Wallace	23XI Racing	Toyota	117*	311.22 (500.859)	2:23:24	130.218	Report	
2022	October 2	9	Chase Elliott	Hendrick Motorsports	Chevrolet	188	500.08 (804.8)	3:15:23	153.569	Report	
2023	October 1	12	Ryan Blaney	Team Penske	Ford	188	500.08 (804.8)	3:07:25	160.097	Report	
2024	October 6	47	Ricky Stenhouse Jr.	JTG Daugherty Racing	Chevrolet	195*	518.7 (834.766)	3:26:24	150.773	Report	
2025	October 19	19	Chase Briscoe	Joe Gibbs Racing	Toyota	193*	513.38 (826.04)	3:26:29	149.178	Report	
2026	October 25	5	Kyle Larson	Hendrick Motorsports	Chevrolet	189*	502.74 (809.082)	3:07:54	160.534	Report	
2027	October 31									Report	

- 1977: Darrell Waltrip finished the race in relief of Allison. Per NASCAR rules Allison is credited with the victory and points.
- 1996: Race started late due to rain, and shortened due to darkness after a lengthy red flag due to the Big One.
- 2005, 2008–2009, 2011–2012, 2014–2016, 2018, 2020, 2024–2026: Race extended due to NASCAR overtime.
- 2019: Race started on Sunday, suspended after 57 laps due to rain and completed on Monday.
- 2021: Race postponed to Monday and shortened due to rain.

=== Multiple winners (drivers) ===
# of wins	Driver	Years won
7	Dale Earnhardt	1983–1984, 1990–1991, 1993, 1999–2000
3	Dale Earnhardt Jr.	2001–2002, 2004
2	Darrell Waltrip	1979, 1982
2	Terry Labonte	1989, 1997
2	Jeff Gordon	1996, 2007
2	Dale Jarrett	1998, 2005
2	Jamie McMurray	2009, 2013
2	Clint Bowyer	2010–2011
2	Brad Keselowski	2014, 2017
2	Joey Logano	2015–2016
2	Ryan Blaney	2019, 2023

=== Multiple winners (teams) ===
# of wins	Team	Years won
8	Richard Childress Racing	1984, 1990–1991, 1993, 1999, 2000, 2010–2011
7	Hendrick Motorsports	1988, 1996–1997, 2006–2007, 2022, 2026
6	Team Penske	2014–2017, 2019, 2023
4	Dale Earnhardt, Inc.	2001–2004
3	Junior Johnson & Associates	1982, 1989, 1994
3	Joe Gibbs Racing	2008, 2020, 2025
2	Petty Enterprises	1970, 1974
2	Bud Moore Engineering	1975, 1983
2	Ranier-Lundy	1978, 1985
2	Morgan-McClure Motorsports	1992, 1995
2	Robert Yates Racing	1998, 2005
2	Roush Fenway Racing	2009, 2012

=== Manufacturer wins ===
# of wins	Manufacturer	Years won
24	Chevrolet	1977, 1984, 1988, 1990–1993, 1995–1997, 1999–2004, 2006–2007, 2010–2011, 2013, 2022, 2024, 2026
18	Ford	1975, 1983, 1985, 1987, 1989, 1994, 1998, 2005, 2009, 2012, 2014–2019, 2023
4	Toyota	2008, 2020–2021, 2025
3	Dodge	1969, 1974, 1976
3	Mercury	1971–1972, 1980
3	Buick	1981–1982, 1986
2	Plymouth	1970, 1973
2	Oldsmobile	1978–1979

== Notable races ==
The race is famous for the high number of dark horses and first-time winners in its history — in the race's first 40 years seven drivers posted their first career win; notable dark horses to win include James Hylton, Dave Marcis, Jimmy Spencer, Jamie McMurray and Bubba Wallace.

- 1969: The race was marred by a driver's strike by the Professional Drivers Association over track safety issues, even though officials proved the track was safe for racing.
- 1971: In the 1971 race, Bobby Allison collided with Richard Petty and Pete Hamilton on the last lap, sending Hamilton into the inside wall.
- 1972: James Hylton raced from mid-pack to the win; he was using a year-old tire compound from Goodyear while fast qualifiers got a new compound, including Joe Frasson; Frasson was involved in an early crash and angrily ripped the new compound ("These new tires Goodyear brought here weren't worth a damn"). 32 of 50 starters failed to finish as Hylton led 106 laps and edged Ramo Stott at the stripe. "I was going with the old tire anyway," Hylton said afterward. "I figured it would be better."
- 1973: In 1973 Dick Brooks survived heat and humidity to himself as well as an overheating engine and shot down heavy favorites Buddy Baker and David Pearson to his only career win. Driving a Plymouth Roadrunner, Brooks started 24th and whipped his way into contention right away; he'd expected to drive a Tom Pistone Ford in the race but the car never showed up, so Jimmy and Peter Crawford hired him to drive their Plymouth. The lead changed 64 times, a motorsports record that stood until 1978. Tragedy marred the race when sophomore driver Larry Smith crashed and was killed in his car early in the race.
- 1974: Before the race, crewmen found slashed tires, tampered alignments, and dirt clogging fuel lines in the garage area. NASCAR threw several competition yellows to allow teams to further check their cars for undetected sabotage; two early crashes happened when cars slipped in oil from other sabotaged cars. Richard Petty won on the last lap by sideswiping David Pearson in the tri-oval and winning by a nose.
- 1975: The race was blackened when former Daytona 500 winner Tiny Lund was crushed to death in a vicious melee on the backstretch by the spinning car of Terry Link. Dick Brooks survived a wild tumble down the backstretch later in that race. Buddy Baker edged Richard Petty after 60 lead changes among 17 drivers.
- 1976: The lead changed 57 times as Richard Petty fell out in the final 20 laps and Buddy Baker had to pit late for fuel, allowing Dave Marcis to whip to the win, his only Talladega win. It was also the first Talladega win for crew chief Harry Hyde whose Dodges had won nine poles at the track.
- 1977: Darrell Waltrip relieved Donnie Allison for the final 40 laps and grabbed the win over Cale Yarborough; it is the most recent time a relief driver won a Winston Cup race.
- 1978: The lead changed a then-record 67 times as Lennie Pond stole the win over Allison and Yarborough; it was Pond's only career win and the first win for Ranier Racing.
- 1980: In 1980, Neil Bonnett fought off a hard challenge from Dale Earnhardt to win in a frantic four-car finish. Driving for the Wood Brothers, Bonnett pulled off what would be the final win for the Mercury automobile brand; it was also the brand's seventh career Talladega win.
- 1981: The race was famous for the finish between Terry Labonte, Darrell Waltrip, and Ron Bouchard. Running third on the final lap, Bouchard darted under both Labonte and Waltrip to pick up his first and only career win. CBS Sports, which televised the event, experienced technical errors in the last laps of the race and showed replays with audio of the finish a week later.
- 1982: The race at Talladega would be the final Talladega start for country music singer Marty Robbins. Robbins would die later that year on December 8. Darrell Waltrip became the first multi-time winner of the race.
- 1983: The rivalry between Waltrip and Bobby Allison came through in a dramatic finish. Allison, two laps down, pushed Dale Earnhardt past Waltrip on the final lap for the win. Waltrip and the Junior Johnson team were upset that Allison was seemingly "blocking" for Earnhardt; Allison claimed he was racing Joe Ruttman, also in the lead pack but laps down, for the position.
- 1984: Dale Earnhardt's first win with Richard Childress came in 1984 running, for many years considered NASCAR's greatest race. The lead changed 68 times among 16 drivers. Terry Labonte stormed to the lead with seven to go in a ten-car pack; crew chief Dale Inman radioed him to get out of the lead in the final laps so he could counterattack on the last lap, but Labonte stayed ahead. Harry Gant made a charge to a battle for third with two to go, but could not get up to the leaders, and on the final lap Earnhardt and Buddy Baker drafted past on the high side; Labonte fought Baker down the stretch, allowing Earnhardt to blast away by three lengths at the stripe.
- 1986: The 1986 race won by Bobby Hillin Jr. saw 26 different leaders, a motorsports record that stood until 2008, and 49 lead changes, a record for the 1986 season. Wrecks eliminated numerous leaders, among them Richard Petty, Geoff Bodine, Darrell Waltrip, and Cale Yarborough. On the final lap, a six-car melee erupted when Sterling Marlin, racing Tim Richmond and Bobby Allison for third, hooked Allison in Turn One and Allison slid into the path of traffic.
- 1989: The second-year with Die Hard batteries sponsorship, it was the final year of the classic "Talladega 500" name. The name would be revived in 2001 as the name of the spring event at Talladega, but for only one year before being changed to the Aaron's 499. The lead changed 49 times as Darrell Waltrip was involved in a hard crash on pit road with rookie Jimmy Spencer; Waltrip rallied from last place and fought for the lead, ultimately finishing second to Terry Labonte, who took his final win with Junior Johnson's team.
- 1991: The race was a frantic affair as the lead changed 31 times officially and some 22 times elsewhere around the track. Dale Earnhardt was engaged in a non-stop battle with Davey Allison, Mark Martin, Sterling Marlin, and Michael Waltrip with Bill Elliott staying in the fray as well. With four to go Allison squeezed ahead of Earnhardt with Marlin drafting him, but Elliott, Martin, and Ricky Rudd drafted with Earnhardt, enabling Earnhardt to seize the win; an enraged Allison broke his wrist punching the wall of his hauler after the race.
- 1993: Dale Earnhardt edged Ernie Irvan by 0.005 seconds, the second-closest finish in Talladega's history since the introduction of electronic scoring loops. The race was marred by two frightening crashes: On lap 69, Stanley Smith and Jimmy Horton got together in turn one, collecting six other cars. Horton's car took the worst hit, as it went up the track and over the outside wall, tumbled out of the racetrack down the embankment, and came to rest on a dirt access road. Though Horton was not seriously injured, Smith suffered a near-fatal basilar skull fracture; he would eventually recover. The incident led track officials to install catch fencing along the entire perimeter of the superspeedways (Daytona and Talladega), rather than just in spectator areas. On Lap 132, Neil Bonnett flew into the catch fence similar to the Bobby Allison crash in 1987. That resulted in the introduction of roof flaps in 1994.
- 1995: A violent wreck unfolded on lap 140 when Jeff Gordon clipped Ken Schrader on the back straightaway, collecting eleven more cars. Schrader took the worst hit, flipping eight times before landing in the grass.
- 1996: One of the most frightening crashes marred the race. On lap 117, battling for the lead in the tri-oval, Sterling Marlin tried to pass Dale Earnhardt on the outside. Ernie Irvan tapped Marlin from behind, sending Marlin into Earnhardt. Both cars slid hard into the outside wall. Earnhardt's car flipped over and was struck again while sliding down the track on its roof. About 6 cars escaped on the inside, while the rest of the field became tangled up in the incident. Ten cars were destroyed, and several more were involved (including some already damaged from an earlier crash). Earnhardt climbed out and waved to the crowd, refusing to be loaded onto a stretcher despite a broken collarbone, sternum, and shoulder blade. A red flag ensued, and because of the late start caused by a rain delay, the race ended with a five-lap shootout on the ensuing restart.
- 1997: Talladega switched its mid-summer race to mid-October starting in 1997 and Ernie Irvan won his final pole for the Robert Yates Racing team, his 28 Ford sporting the white on the black color scheme used by Davey Allison on the tenth anniversary of his successful rookie season. The race became the most competitive of the season at 32 official lead changes among 16 drivers. A huge crash erupted on the backstretch after a collision between Jeff Gordon and John Andretti; Gordon stated his left rear tire blew out. Terry Labonte swept past Ken Schrader with two laps to go and edged brother Bobby Labonte; it was Terry's only win of the season and only win for a Chevrolet other than Gordon.
- 1999: A frantic race saw sixteen leaders and 21 cars battling at the finish. Dale Earnhardt charged from 27th place to 5th place in the opening three laps. He didn't lead until past halfway but stayed in contention and drafted past Dale Jarrett with five to go. It was his ninth Talladega race win.
- 2000: This was Dale Earnhardt's 76th and last recorded win before his death. With four laps to go, Dale Earnhardt Jr. was leading Earnhardt Sr. was scored in 17th place. In the next four laps, Earnhardt Sr. found an opening and took the lead at the white flag. He then held off the field to win the race, while Earnhardt Jr. went from leading to a 14th-place finish when he was shuffled out of the pack in the last two laps.
- 2001: Dale Earnhardt Jr. won his third race of 2001, and first of four straight at Talladega. The first half of the race was caution-free, with the race's first caution flag not appearing until lap 99, when Kevin Harvick sent Todd Bodine into the outside wall in turn 3, also collecting Elliott Sadler and Casey Atwood. In the last 55 laps, Earnhardt Jr., Bobby Hamilton, and Bobby Labonte changed the lead multiple times. With five laps to go, Labonte took the lead from Earnhardt Jr. He was still leading at the white flag, but heading into turn 1, Earnhardt Jr. moved to the low lane, bringing Tony Stewart and Jeff Burton. Entering turn 2, Labonte drifted up, out of the draft, and tried to block Hamilton. Exiting turn 2, Hamilton tagged Labonte from behind, sending Labonte into Johnny Benson Jr. and Ricky Craven, running in fourth and fifth place. Labonte's car then flipped over onto its roof, while Benson was shot into the inside wall and collected another 14 cars, including Jason Leffler, Sterling Marlin, Ward Burton, Robby Gordon, Mike Wallace, Terry Labonte, and Buckshot Jones. As the wreck occurred, Earnhardt Jr., Jeff Burton, and Tony Stewart continued racing towards the finish, followed by another group of cars from the reduced pack, composed of Jeff Gordon, Matt Kenseth, Kenny Wallace, and Hamilton. Earnhardt Jr. rocketed away in the tri-oval to win the race by several car-lengths as Burton and Stewart battled side by side for second place, winning the No Bull 5 $1 million bonus, just as his father had done a year prior. He was docked 25 points after his car failed post-race inspection, due to a shortened rear spoiler.
- 2002: Dale Earnhardt Jr.'s third consecutive Talladega win came in the third and last Talladega race to be caution-free. He won on fuel strategy. This race is also remembered for an unusual accident during the warm-up laps. There was no qualifying due to rain, so the front row starting spots went to points leader Jimmie Johnson and second-place Mark Martin. Martin suffered an issue with his steering box, causing him to swerve into Johnson and cause significant damage to his front end. As a result of the incident, Martin was black-flagged, while Johnson's crew chief Chad Knaus requested NASCAR to inspect the car and repair the damaged right front fender. Johnson later came into the garage on lap one, ending his day with engine trouble. Jeff Gordon led the first three laps, but on lap 125, he was forced to move the car to the garage after his crew found smoke under the hood, ending his race. To make matters even worse, Terry Labonte and Joe Nemechek also failed to finish due to engine problems; this meant that none of Hendrick Motorsports’ primary drivers were running at the end of the event.
- 2003: Michael Waltrip's fourth and last win came in this race in 2003. It is also his only non-Daytona race win. He and teammate Dale Earnhardt Jr. finished 1–2. With seven laps to go, Elliott Sadler, the third-place finisher from the spring race, went airborne and tumbled down the backstretch into the turn three aprons after being tagged by Kurt Busch. As this was the first restrictor-plate race to follow the elimination of racing back to the caution, the yellow flag and subsequent red flag for cleanup caused by Sadler's accident nullified Ward Burton's pass on Waltrip into first.
  - This was DEI's fifth straight Talladega win, and first with Waltrip, after four straight with Dale Earnhardt Jr.
- 2004: Dale Earnhardt Jr.'s win in 2004, his fifth overall at the track, was a dramatic one, as on the last lap of the race, Jeff Gordon brushed the wall exiting turn two, collecting then-rookie Kasey Kahne and Greg Biffle. No caution was thrown for the wreck, and the leaders continued to race to the finish line. At the finish, Elliott Sadler repeated the tumble of the previous year. This time, he flipped at the start-finish line after making contact with Ward Burton, in almost the same location that Rusty Wallace had taken a very violent airborne crash off Dale Earnhardt's bumper in 1993.
  - The race had several wrecks, the biggest one being a hard crash that took out championship contender Jeremy Mayfield. Brendan Gaughan triggered a scary crash that sent Bobby Labonte and Sterling Marlin head-on into the outside wall.
  - The race was also famous for Earnhardt Jr. using an obscenity during the post-race television interview, when he uttered "...It don't mean shit, daddy done won here 10 times..." during his post-race interview on NBC. He has penalized 25 championship points as a result (in the aftermath of the Super Bowl XXXVIII halftime show controversy, NASCAR imposed stiffer penalties for drivers who used obscenities in interviews; a similar one would be imposed when Tony Stewart won the Brickyard 400 in 2007).
- 2005: Much like the EA Sports 500 the year before, the 2005 UAW-Ford 500 was a wild race. Two cars flipped over in separate accidents. Michael Waltrip was hit by Mark Martin and flipped after being involved in a wreck that began when Jimmie Johnson spun Elliott Sadler. Not long after, Ryan Newman spun Casey Mears, which started a chain reaction resulting in Scott Riggs flipping several times before being hit by Jeff Burton. The race was incident-filled, and Dale Jarrett took his last win in the race. Scenes from this race were used in the movie Talladega Nights: The Ballad of Ricky Bobby and actors from the movie were introduced in driver introductions.
- 2006: The October 2006 running was the first at Talladega since the track was repaved following the May 1 Aaron's 499. The new asphalt proved exceptionally race and the lead changed hands 63 times among 23 drivers. In the final laps Dale Earnhardt Jr. led with Jimmie Johnson and Johnson's teammate Brian Vickers in a charge towards the finish. On the final lap in the halfway mark of the final lap Vickers, trying for his first Cup win, went below Johnson who tried to block but was far too late to defend and just in turn 3 Johnson and Earnhardt Jr. spun around to crash as Vickers charged to the win in a close finish with Kasey Kahne under caution. Although Kahne was briefly in front of Vickers during the charge to the checkered flag during the caution, the video showed that at the moment of caution Vickers was the leader and thus freezing the field in the finish. The fans were furious with Vickers and threw bottles at him. Vickers was emotional about his win since he was leaving Hendrick Motorsports to join Red Bull Racing and wanted a win to dedicate to the Hendrick family members that died in the 2004 plane crash at Martinsville.
- 2007: The 2007 UAW-Ford 500 was won by Jeff Gordon in dramatic style. Gordon pulled off a comeback much like Dale Earnhardt had in 2000, working his way from the back in the closing laps, and passed teammate Jimmie Johnson with a push from Tony Stewart on the final lap. It was the first Talladega race for the recently launched fifth-generation chassis.
- 2008: The newly named AMP Energy 500 in 2008 saw 64 lead changes among a motorsports record 28 leaders (broken in the 2010 spring race). Two accidents (one a ten-car crash that came when Brian Vickers' right-front tire disintegrated, the other a ten-car melee involving Greg Biffle, Matt Kenseth, Carl Edwards, Dale Earnhardt Jr., and others) took a number of contenders out in spectacular fashion. Regan Smith passed Tony Stewart on the apron of the tri-oval at the finish. The pass was ruled illegal by NASCAR in prohibiting passing under the yellow line; controversy ensued, however, as NASCAR spokesman Ramsey Poston the year before had commented to the effect that the yellow-line rule did not apply on the final lap, and NASCAR was ridiculed in the media over the decision. The victory was awarded to Stewart, what proved to be his final win for Joe Gibbs Racing and his only win driving anything other than a General Motors vehicle; JGR had switched engine suppliers to Toyota for 2008 after running Chevrolet and Pontiac vehicles since the team was founded.
- 2009: The race was set up in a green-white-checkered finish after Ryan Newman spun and blew over, landing on top of Kevin Harvick with five laps to go, in the same place and in an eerily similar matter to Sadler's 2003 blow over. Newman's flip was the direct result of the rear wing on the Car of Tomorrow lifting the car off the ground and rendering the roof flaps useless; this crash, along with Carl Edwards' crash at the spring race and Brad Keselowski's crash at Atlanta the next year, was one of the factors in NASCAR's decision to replace the wing with a more traditional spoiler in 2010. Before the cars got underway some ran out of fuel. Jamie McMurray led the restart alongside Brian Vickers; Vickers beat McMurray to the line but was not penalized but McMurray squeezed ahead. When the field came off turn 4, Brad Keselowski spun Kurt Busch causing a chain reaction; Mark Martin tumbled on his roof and came back on his wheels as McMurray took the win. It was his 3rd career win and last for Roush as he went on to Earnhardt Ganassi Racing in 2010. The race was criticized because during the pre-race driver's meeting Mike Helton told the drivers "we will have a problem" with tandem drafting in the corners, an issue discovered during the spring race. The drivers spent three periods of 15–20 laps riding single file, but the lead changed 58 times among 25 drivers, both season highs.
- 2010: On Halloween 2010 NASCAR declared Clint Bowyer the winner after the yellow flew on the start of the final lap for A. J. Allmendinger's blow over just past the start/finish line. Bowyer has ruled ahead of teammate Kevin Harvick at a Turn One scoring loop. Due to a brief delay by NASCAR in announcing who was ahead, Bowyer and Harvick were confused as to which one of them had won. Believing he was the leader, Bowyer did his victory burnout prematurely and almost had to be stopped as he drove back down pit road towards victory lane. The race lead changed 87 times among 26 drivers, the second straight Talladega race to break 80 official lead changes.
- 2011: This was the first NASCAR Cup Series race to follow the death of IndyCar driver Dan Wheldon at Las Vegas Motor Speedway, and several drivers painted tributes on their cars for this race; NASCAR also provided "Lionheart Knight" decals that Wheldon wore on his helmet to be added to the cars' b-pillars. Clint Bowyer defended his previous win by slingshotting past his Richard Childress teammate Jeff Burton on the final lap and winning by a hood. It was the 100th career win for Richard Childress Racing and it came the following the announcement that Bowyer would move to Michael Waltrip Racing for 2012 (by coincidence, Bowyer was driving a special 100th Anniversary of Chevrolet paint scheme). The track before the race posted a $100,000 bonus if the race reached 100 official lead changes, the bonus going to the driver who made the 100th pass. The bonus went unclaimed as the race lead changed 72 times.
- 2012: Matt Kenseth won his first Talladega race in a very competitive run that saw 18 different leaders and 55 lead changes. On the final lap, with the entire field four abreast and Tony Stewart fighting Kenseth for the win, Stewart tried to block the advancing drafting pair of Michael Waltrip and Casey Mears coming in to turn 4. The ensuing move and subsequent contact caused Waltrip to spin up the banking in front of the entire field, and Stewart went airborne as Waltrip was tagged by Casey and both went into the outside wall and 23 cars were collected, the most cars to be involved in any single Big One since 2010. 10 of the 12 Chase drivers were involved (the only three not involved were Kenseth, Jeff Gordon, and Kyle Busch, the top three finishers). David Ragan and Regan Smith escaped the melee to cross the start/finish line 4th and 5th respectively. Dale Earnhardt Jr., also involved was highly critical of the crash, and was sidelined for the next two races at Charlotte and Kansas after being diagnosed with a concussion, replaced by Smith for those races. Busch and Kenseth had been the runner-up finishers in the spring Talladega race.
- 2013: The race was surprisingly clean, only seeing two caution flags during the first 187 laps. The lead changed 52 times among 20 drivers. The race was dominated by Matt Kenseth, Jimmie Johnson, and Dale Earnhardt Jr. On the last lap, Austin Dillon was running third behind Jamie McMurray and Dillon and was about to push Earnhardt Jr. past McMurray when he was turned by Ricky Stenhouse Jr. coming off Turn 2. Dillon spun against the outside wall, then was struck head-on by Casey Mears and caught air. McMurray's win was the second straight Chase race of 2013 won by a non-Chaser. It also snapped a 108-race winless streak for McMurray that stretched back to October 2010 and also his final career-win.
- 2014: Kyle Larson spun on the apron of turn 1 and brought out the fourth caution of the race with 14 laps to go. Jeff Gordon was the only car who hadn't pitted and had to give up the lead to stop for fuel. Ryan Newman cycled to the lead, The race went past its advertised distance and went into overtime. The first overtime attempt resulted in another big one on the backstretch that collected 11 cars. It started when David Gilliland tapped Greg Biffle who clipped Dale Earnhardt Jr. and collected nine other cars. Brad Keselowski was ahead of race leader Newman and assumed the lead, Brad Keselowski held off a hard-charging Ryan Newman and Matt Kenseth to win the race with the pack behind them, being stacked up. "I can't believe it," Keselowski said. "Talladega is such a wild card and to be able to win here you have to catch breaks and make your own breaks, a little of both. I can't believe we won at Talladega. This race is the scariest of the three in the bracket. To be able to win here is really a privilege, it really is." Kyle Busch, Dale Earnhardt Jr., Kasey Kahne, and Jimmie Johnson were the four drivers who were eliminated. "We had a real good car most of the day," Earnhardt said. "Got real loose, kind of shuffled out. ... It's just hard racing. That's the way it goes at the end of these races. We weren't in a good position." It was the first of a long winning streak for Ford and Roush engines at this race.
- 2015: The first 135 laps were run under green-flag conditions, and then the 2nd caution flew with 4 to go with Greg Biffle holding a 38-second lead, setting up a questionable finish. On the only attempt at a green-white-checker (a rule NASCAR mandated for this race after Austin Dillon's scary crash in July at Daytona), Jimmie Johnson and Kyle Larson spun coming to take the green, which caused NASCAR to waive off the restart, saying that "it was not an official restart", to the ire of drivers and fans. Then, Kevin Harvick reported to crew chief Rodney Childers that his motor was going. On the "2nd attempt" at the restart, Harvick hooked the 6 of Trevor Bayne just after the exit of pit road, causing a crash that ended the race which involved chasers Ryan Newman, Denny Hamlin, and Matt Kenseth, among others (the crash ended Newman, Kenseth, and Hamlin's chances at a title). After looking over the scoring and video, NASCAR declared Joey Logano the winner over Dale Earnhardt Jr., causing irate fans to shower Logano with beer cans as he did his burnouts. NASCAR did not sanction Harvick for his actions after the race. The controversy over this finish led to NASCAR introducing the overtime line rule for the 2016 season, which was subsequently eliminated in 2017 in favour of unlimited attempts until one legal green flag lap was completed.
- 2016: After the round of stops, Keselowski led from lap 89 to 109. Ryan Blaney took the lead for a circuit on lap 110 and Hamlin moved back to the front on lap 111. A three-car wreck on the front stretch involving Biffle, Jeffrey Earnhardt, and Casey Mears brought out the second caution with 74 laps to go, Past the scheduled distance of 188 laps, the race restarted on lap 190 with two laps to go. Logano drove on to score the victory.
- 2017: Dale Earnhardt Jr. won the pole for the first and final time at Talladega. The race was filled with numerous wrecks, with 10 of the 12 playoff drivers being involved in wrecks. Jamie McMurray was involved in a 6 car crash on lap 25 during green-flag stops, which put him in a must-win situation. Brad Keselowski and Ryan Blaney would win the first and second stages respectively. The Big One occurred in Turn 3 on Lap 172 and took out 17 cars, including Martin Truex Jr., Jimmie Johnson, Kyle Busch, Kevin Harvick, Matt Kenseth, and Ricky Stenhouse Jr. Two more small crashes occurred during the next stretch that ended Blaney and Harvick's day, and another with 5 to go that took out Chase Elliott and Kyle Larson. On the last restart, Keselowski drove on to victory after an intense battle for the lead with Ryan Newman, who finished runner up. Denny Hamlin was the other playoff driver who was running at the line at a 6th-place finish with no damage, and Earnhardt Jr. finished 7th in his final restrictor-plate start after spinning through the turn 3 grass to avoid the Big One. Only 14 cars were running at the finish, the lowest number of cars to finish in Talladega's history tied with the 1986 race, mainly assisted with a new NASCAR rule to prohibit cars involved in incidents from returning to the track.
- 2019: The race was interrupted after a caution-free stage 1 by rain, postponing stages 2 and 3 to Monday. During the second stage, every one of the playoff drivers was involved in at least one accident, and there were three Big Ones. The first was on Lap 107 in the closing laps of Stage 2, when Joey Logano ran into Alex Bowman from behind on the backstretch, causing Bowman to spin onto the apron and then back into the pack in turn 3, collecting nine additional cars. The second was on Lap 163 when, entering turn 3, William Byron was turned into Logano by Kurt Busch, collecting six more cars. Finally, on Lap 181, in the same location as the previous two Big Ones, Kurt Busch tried to give brother Kyle a push to challenge Ricky Stenhouse Jr. for the lead, turning Kyle into Brendan Gaughan and collecting 11 cars in all. Gaughan took the worst hit as his car went airborne from contact with Matt DiBenedetto and Kurt Busch and flipped over once before landing upright in turn 3. On the last lap, Ryan Blaney was leading at the white flag and being trailed by the previous year's winner Aric Almirola. Heading down the backstretch, Ryan Newman got pushed to the lead by Denny Hamlin. Newman was leading exiting turn 4 and moved up in an attempt to block Blaney. Blaney got Newman loose, went to Newman's inside, and managed to inch ahead of Newman at the finish line by 0.006 seconds, the sixth closest margin of victory in NASCAR history, and securing Blaney a spot in the Round of 8.
- 2020: The most competitive race of the 2020 season - 58 official lead changes among eighteen drivers- occurred in October 2020 and was won by Denny Hamlin under controversy. A series of late yellows that included three green white checkered finishes erupted into a chaotic last lap. Hamlin fell out of the top five briefly on the final restart; Matt DiBenedetto led at the white flag but William Byron, Chris Buescher, and Erik Jones clawed into contention, DiBenedetto chopped off Buescher while Byron and Jones nearly crashed; Hamlin slid onto the apron of Turn Four but stormed to win by a wheel. Controversy ensued when NASCAR initially held up calling the win because of cars racing below the yellow line and ruled DiBenedetto had shoved Hamlin below the line; Hamlin was declared winner and DiBenedetto penalized from second to 21st. Chase Elliott was initially penalized as well but reinstated to finish fifth. Bubba Wallace recently announced to drive a Toyota for Hamlin with backing from Michael Jordan, drafted Richard Petty Motorsports’ 43 to lead ten laps; he slapped the wall but rallied to sixth before a crash with Ryan Preece, Ryan Blaney, and others set up the final restart. This was the second time in history that it took three attempts at overtime to finish the race. Tied the April 2010 event (which also took three attempts) as the longest race run in Talladega's history at 200 laps (532 miles). This race also featured a record-breaking 13 cautions beating out the previous record of 11 from the October 2017 event, and the first Cup race to go over four hours.
- 2021: The race was threatened by rain showers as the race was postponed to Monday. Regular season champion Kyle Larson would get involved in an accident with Justin Allgaier at the end of stage 1 with Chris Buescher getting the stage win. Larson would again have issues with blowing a tire during the second stage, and a brief rain shower halted the race. Alex Bowman would crash out from the lead collecting Martin Truex Jr., Tyler Reddick, and Kyle Busch. As the race passed the halfway point, more rain was forecasted to impact the track. With 5 to go before the end of stage 2, Ryan Preece would get turned into the wall heading into turn 3 collecting William Byron and Matt DiBenedetto. During the caution period, rain would begin to fall on the track with Bubba Wallace leading as the red flag would fall on lap 117, 3 laps short of stage 2. After another rain shower soaking the track and concerns of getting the track dry before sunset, NASCAR called the race official with Wallace earning his first career win as well as giving 23XI Racing its first team win. Wallace would become the first African-American to win a NASCAR Cup Series race since Wendell Scott in 1963, and would mark the first time all 3 national series would have first-time winners the same weekend.

Previous race: Freeway Insurance 500	NASCAR Cup Series; YellaWood 500	Next race: Xfinity 500
