= 2009 Sylvania 300 =

Race details
- Race 27 of 36 in the 2009 NASCAR Sprint Cup Series
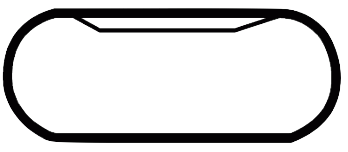
- Layout of New Hampshire Motor Speedway
- Date: September 20, 2009
- Location: New Hampshire Motor Speedway, Loudon, New Hampshire
- Course: Permanent racing facility
- Course length: 1.058 miles (1.702 km)
- Distance: 300 laps, 317.4 mi (510.805 km)
- Weather: Mild with temperatures approaching 72 °F (22 °C); wind speeds up to 6 miles per hour (9.7 km/h)
- Average speed: 100.753 miles per hour (162.146 km/h)

Pole position
Driver	Juan Pablo Montoya	Earnhardt Ganassi Racing
- Time: 28.545

Most laps led
Driver	Juan Pablo Montoya	Earnhardt Ganassi Racing
- Laps: 105

Winner
No. 5	Mark Martin	Hendrick Motorsports

Television in the United States
- Network: ESPN
- Announcers: Jerry Punch, Dale Jarrett and Andy Petree
- Nielsen ratings: 3.2/7 (Final); 2.5/6 (Overnight); (5.04 million)

The 2009 Sylvania 300 was the twenty-seventh stock car race of the 2009 NASCAR Sprint Cup Series and the first in the ten-race season-ending Chase for the Sprint Cup. It was held on September 20, 2009, at New Hampshire Motor Speedway in Loudon, New Hampshire, before a crowd of 101,000 people. The 300-lap race was won by Mark Martin of the Hendrick Motorsports team after starting from fourteenth position. Denny Hamlin of Joe Gibbs Racing finished second and Earnhardt Ganassi Racing's Juan Pablo Montoya was in third place.

Martin was leading the Drivers' Championship heading into the race because of a redistribution of the points-scoring system that saw him receive an additional forty points for achieving four race victories in the preceding 26 events. Montoya, who initially held the pole position by recording the fastest lap time in qualifying, was immediately passed by Tony Stewart. One lap later, Montoya reclaimed the lead. Chase for the Sprint Cup participants Hamlin and Kurt Busch were in the top ten for most of the race. Martin became the leader of the race, after the leaders made their pit stops. Martin retained the first position to win the race, his fifth of the 2009 season. There were eleven cautions and twenty lead changes among ten different drivers during the race.

The race was Martin's fifth win of the season, as well as the 40th and final win of his Cup career. After the race, Martin maintained his lead in the Drivers' Championship, thirty-five points ahead of Hamlin, who advanced to second, and equal on points with Johnson. Chevrolet maintained its lead in the Manufacturers' Championship, thirty-nine points ahead of Toyota and eighty-one ahead of Dodge, with nine races of the season remaining. The race attracted 5.04 million television viewers.

== Background ==
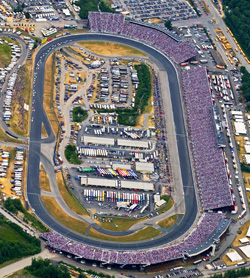
New Hampshire Motor Speedway, where the race was held.

The 2009 Sylvania 300 was the twenty-seventh of thirty-six scheduled stock car races of the 2009 NASCAR Sprint Cup Series and the first in the ten-race season-ending Chase for the Sprint Cup. It was held on September 20, 2009, in Loudon, New Hampshire, at New Hampshire Motor Speedway, an intermediate track that holds NASCAR races. The standard track at New Hampshire Motor Speedway is a four-turn oval track, 1.058 miles (1.703 km) long. The track's turns are banked at two to seven degrees, while the front stretch, the finish line, and the back stretch are banked at one degree.

Before the race, twelve drivers gained qualification to the Chase for the Sprint Cup; each of them had no fewer than 5,000 points and those who won races over the course of the season received an additional ten points. This was done through a redistribution of the points system. Mark Martin led the Drivers' Championship with 5,040 points by virtue of his four victories in the preceding 26 races, followed by Tony Stewart and Jimmie Johnson who were tied for second place on 5,030 points. Denny Hamlin, was 5,020 points, was tied with Kasey Kahne, with Jeff Gordon, Kurt Busch and Brian Vickers all level with 5,010 points. Carl Edwards, Ryan Newman, Juan Pablo Montoya and Greg Biffle rounded out the top twelve with 5,000 points each. In the Manufacturers' Championship, Chevrolet was leading with 190 points, thirty-six points ahead of their rival Toyota in second. Dodge and Ford were tied on points in the battle for third place. Biffle was the race's defending champion.

Johnson had qualified for all six previous Chase for the Sprint Cups and spoke of his expectations, "I think we've got our best chance for a really exciting Chase. We're really running well. I feel really good at the races in the Chase." Martin commented on his prospects, "I feel like a whole new person — a huge weight is off my shoulders. To make this thing is the icing and now we get to go race for the cake." Montoya was the first non-American driver to advance to the Chase for the Sprint Cup, and said he felt he was under no pressure to be in it, adding, "If I win the Cup, cool. That's it. That's not a big deal for me. I don't get any special treatment or anything. I wouldn't mind getting some but I don't."

== Practice and qualifying ==
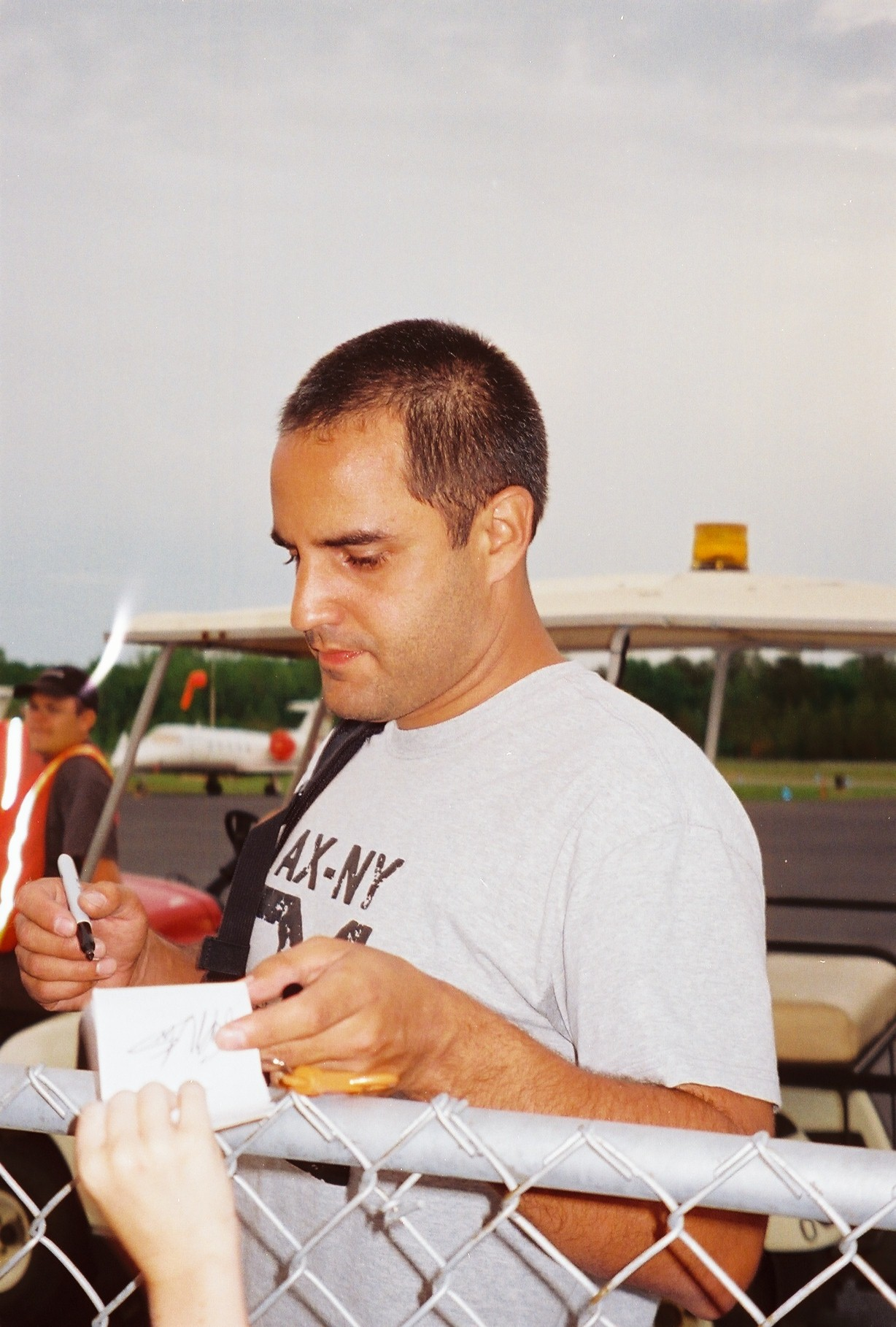
Juan Pablo Montoya won pole position with the fastest time, 28.545.

Three practice sessions were held before the Sunday race—one on Friday, and two on Saturday. The first session lasted 90 minutes, and the second 45 minutes. The final session lasted 60 minutes. During the first practice session, Montoya was fastest with a lap of 28.749 seconds, placing ahead of Kevin Harvick in second and Clint Bowyer in third. Stewart took fourth position, and Martin placed fifth. Kurt Busch, A. J. Allmendinger, Kyle Busch, Johnson and Hamlin rounded out the top ten fastest drivers in the session.

A total of forty-five drivers were entered in the qualifier on Friday afternoon; due to NASCAR's qualifying procedure, forty-three were allowed to race. Each driver ran two laps, with the starting order determined by the competitor's fastest times. On his second timed lap, Montoya clinched his second pole position of the season and of his career, with a track-record lap of 28.545 seconds. He was joined on the grid's front row by Stewart. Kurt Busch qualified third and Hamlin took fourth after holding pole position for most of the season. Edwards started fifth. David Stremme was the fastest driver who was unable to advance for the Chase for the Sprint Cup in sixth. Martin Truex Jr., Bobby Labonte and Kyle Busch completed the top nine qualifiers. Jeff Gordon, one of the drivers in the Chase for the Sprint Cup, qualified tenth, while Kahne set the eleventh-fastest time. The two drivers who failed to qualify for the race were Derrike Cope and Dexter Bean. After the qualifier Montoya said, "You know how these races go, "If it was a 10-lap shootout, I'll say, 'Hey, we're looking good.' But it's like 200 laps, 300 laps or something, or 400, I don't even know. It's a bunch of laps. As long as I lead the last one I don't care."

On Saturday morning, Montoya was fastest in the second practice session with a 29.269 seconds lap, ahead of Truex in second, and Martin in third. Stremme was fourth quickest, and Johnson took fifth. Hamlin managed sixth. Kurt Busch, Biffle, Labonte and Kahne followed in the top ten. Of the other drivers in the Chase, Stewart was eighteenth-fastest, while Edwards ended with twenty-third-fastest time. Later that day, Montoya paced the final practice session with a time of 29.214 seconds, ahead of Truex in second and Kurt Busch in third. Martin was fourth-fastest, ahead of Johnson and Dale Earnhardt Jr. Hamlin was seventh-fastest, Jeff Gordon eighth-, Harvick ninth- and Stewart tenth-fastest. Other Chase drivers included Kahne in fourteenth and Biffle in twentieth.

=== Qualifying results ===
Grid	No.	Driver	Team	Manufacturer	Time	Speed
1	42	Juan Pablo Montoya	Earnhardt Ganassi Racing	Chevrolet	28.545	133.431
2	14	Tony Stewart	Stewart–Haas Racing	Chevrolet	28.728	132.581
3	2	Kurt Busch	Penske Championship Racing	Dodge	28.728	132.581
4	11	Denny Hamlin	Joe Gibbs Racing	Toyota	28.848	132.038
5	99	Carl Edwards	Roush Fenway Racing	Ford	28.852	132.012
6	12	David Stremme	Penske Racing	Dodge	28.867	131.943
7	1	Martin Truex Jr.	Earnhardt Ganassi Racing	Chevrolet	28.887	131.852
8	71	Bobby Labonte	TRG Motorsports	Chevrolet	28.888	131.847
9	18	Kyle Busch	Joe Gibbs Racing	Toyota	28.892	131.829
10	24	Jeff Gordon	Hendrick Motorsports	Chevrolet	28.901	131.788
11	9	Kasey Kahne	Richard Petty Motorsports	Dodge	28.907	131.760
12	29	Kevin Harvick	Richard Childress Racing	Chevrolet	28.915	131.724
13	00	David Reutimann	Michael Waltrip Racing	Toyota	28.962	131.510
14	5	Mark Martin	Hendrick Motorsports	Chevrolet	28.994	131.365
15	66	Dave Blaney	Prism Motorsports	Toyota	28.997	131.352
16	48	Jimmie Johnson	Hendrick Motorsports	Chevrolet	29.023	131.234
17	33	Clint Bowyer	Richard Childress Racing	Chevrolet	29.023	131.234
18	39	Ryan Newman	Stewart–Haas Racing	Chevrolet	29.024	131.229
19	07	Casey Mears	Richard Childress Racing	Chevrolet	29.055	131.089
20	87	Joe Nemechek	NEMCO Motorsports	Toyota	29.057	131.080
21	55	Michael Waltrip	Michael Waltrip Motorsports	Toyota	29.062	131.058
22	16	Greg Biffle	Roush Fenway Racing	Ford	29.068	131.031
23	88	Dale Earnhardt Jr.	Hendrick Motorsports	Chevrolet	29.071	131.017
24	77	Sam Hornish Jr.	Team Penske	Dodge	29.073	131.008
25	43	Reed Sorenson	Richard Petty Motorsports	Dodge	29.094	130.914
26	86	Brian Vickers	Red Bull Racing Team	Toyota	29.153	130.649
27	82	Scott Speed	Red Bull Racing Team	Toyota	29.153	130.649
28	7	Robby Gordon	Robby Gordon Motorsports	Toyota	29.156	130.635
29	26	Jamie McMurray	Roush Fenway Racing	Ford	29.160	130.617
30	64	Mike Wallace	Gunselman Motorsports	Toyota	29.161	130.613
31	47	Marcos Ambrose	JTG Daugherty Racing	Toyota	29.165	130.595
32	31	Jeff Burton	Richard Childress Racing	Chevrolet	29.192	130.474
33	20	Joey Logano	Joe Gibbs Racing	Toyota	29.197	130.452
34	44	A. J. Allmendinger	Richard Petty Motorsports	Dodge	29.204	130.421
35	19	Elliott Sadler	Richard Petty Motorsports	Dodge	29.230	130.305
36	37	Tony Raines	Front Row Motorsports	Dodge	29.321	129.900^{1}
37	96	Erik Darnell	Hall of Fame Racing	Ford	29.321	129.789
38	17	Matt Kenseth	Roush Fenway Racing	Ford	29.383	129.686
39	09	Aric Almirola	Phoenix Racing	Dodge	29.450	129.331
40	98	Paul Menard	Robert Yates Racing	Ford	29.513	129.055
41	34	John Andretti	Front Row Motorsports	Chevrolet	29.562	128.841
42	6	David Ragan	Roush Fenway Racing	Ford	29.925	127.278
43	36	Michael McDowell	Tommy Baldwin Racing	Toyota	29.461	129.283
Failed to qualify
44	75	Derrike Cope	Cope/Keller Racing	Dodge	29.978	127.053
45	51	Dexter Bean	BlackJack Racing	Dodge	30.027	126.846

== Race ==
The race commenced at 1:00 p.m. Eastern Daylight Time and was televised live in the United States on ESPN. Commentary was provided by play-by-play announcer Jerry Punch, with analysis by Dale Jarrett and Andy Petree. Around the start of the race, weather conditions were sunny with the air temperature around 67 °F (19 °C). Bishop Michael Cote began pre-race ceremonies with the invocation. Universal Music Group Nashville recording artist Josh Turner performed the national anthem, and Tim Leach, Vice President of Sales, Service and Logistics for Sylvania, gave the command for drivers to start their engines. During the pace laps, Tony Raines had to move to the back of the grid because of him changing his engine.

Stewart accelerated faster than Montoya off the line, getting ahead of him going into the first turn. One lap later, Montoya reclaimed the lead by passing Stewart in turn one. Stremme moved into fourth on lap three, while Hamlin passed Stewart for the second position. Vickers, who began the race in twenty-sixth, had moved up seven positions to nineteenth by lap five. By the sixth lap, Montoya had increased his lead over Stewart to 1.4 seconds. Five laps later, Jeff Gordon moved into sixth position, while Edwards passed Labonte for eighth. By lap 15, Montoya had a 2.3-second lead over Stewart. Seven laps later, Stewart had reduced Montoya's lead to 1.1 seconds.

On lap 24, Dave Blaney took his car to the garage because of an electrical problem. Seven laps later, Truex lost three positions after running seventh. On lap 37, Stewart reclaimed the lead from Montoya. On the 39th lap, Michael McDowell drove to the garage because of brake problems. During the 43rd lap, Jeff Gordon passed Hamlin for fourth position. After starting the race in twenty-third, Earnhardt moved up into fifteenth position by lap 46. Four laps later, Stremme dropped to sixth position, after being passed by Edwards and Johnson. On lap 51, Jeff Gordon passed Hamlin for the fourth position, while Mike Wallace took his car to the garage because of brake problems. By lap 56, Harvick and Labonte were running in nineteenth and twentieth, while Stewart's lead was 1.7 seconds by lap 63.

Three laps later, Kahne felt something rough on the backstretch and his car suffered an engine problem with smoke billowing from the front of his car while on the frontstretch; the issue was found to have been caused by crankshaft failure and it forced his retirement from the race. This caused the deployment of the first caution of the event during the 67th lap. During the caution, all of the leaders elected to make pit stops. Montoya reclaimed the lead during the caution and maintained it at the restart on the 75th lap. Jeff Gordon passed Martin for the seventh position on lap 79. By the 83rd lap, Montoya's lead was 1.8 seconds over Stewart. Two laps later, the second caution was given because of debris on the track at turn three. None of the leaders elected to make pit stops. Montoya maintained his lead at the restart, followed by Stewart and Hamlin.

Stewart fell to fifth after contact with Hamlin on lap 92, allowing Kurt Busch to move into second position one lap later. On lap 95, Jeff Gordon passed Truex for twelfth position. By lap 101, Montoya had a lead of 1.2 seconds. Kurt Busch managed to close the gap to Montoya by 0.7 seconds by lap 110. On the 113th lap, Jeff Gordon passed Vickers to claim eleventh. Twelve laps later, Kurt Busch claimed the lead off Montoya. Five laps later, Jeff Gordon moved up to ninth, while Newman and Vickers moved up to tenth and eleventh respectively. On lap 131, Earnhardt passed Martin for the tenth position. By lap 138, Kurt Busch had a 2.4-second lead over Montoya.

On lap 141, the third caution was given as debris was spotted on the track. During the caution, all of the leaders made pit stops. At the lap 146 restart. Montoya became the leader, ahead of Hamlin and Kurt Busch. Two laps later, Hamlin moved into first, one lap after colliding with Montoya. On lap 153, Montoya reclaimed the lead through turn four. Five laps later, Johnson passed Martin for the sixth position. Three laps later, the fourth caution was given after Erik Darnell spun sideways in turn two. Most of the leaders made pit stops. As David Ragan was entering his pit stall, the left-rear quarter of his car was struck by Kurt Busch, sending Ragan into a 180-degree backwards spin as his pit crew were about to service him. Ragan was permitted to have four tires and fuel since his pit stop complied with NASCAR standards. Kurt Busch sustained minor damage to the nose of his vehicle. Stewart became the leader at the lap 166 restart. Two laps after the restart, the fifth caution was given as a multi-car collision occurred, as Joey Logano and Elliott Sadler collided, collecting Paul Menard, Michael Waltrip, Robby Gordon and John Andretti.

Stewart led on the lap 175 restart; the sixth caution was given on the following lap as Jeff Burton spun sideways but avoided hitting anything. At the lap 181 restart, Stewart was the leader, ahead of Johnson, Newman, Earnhardt and Hamlin. On the next lap, Johnson claimed the lead through turn one, while Sam Hornish Jr. went to his garage due to oil issues. Two laps later, Earnhardt and Montoya moved up into third and fifth positions respectively. Five laps later, Montoya passed McMurray for the fourth position; Earnhardt passed Stewart for second. By the 190th lap, Johnson had a lead of three seconds, while Montoya passed Stewart for third. On lap 193, Allmendinger made contact with Stremme who spun into the wall at turn two, prompting the seventh caution. Most of the leaders made pit stops during the caution. Kurt Busch became the leader by the lap 197 restart, from Martin and Sadler.

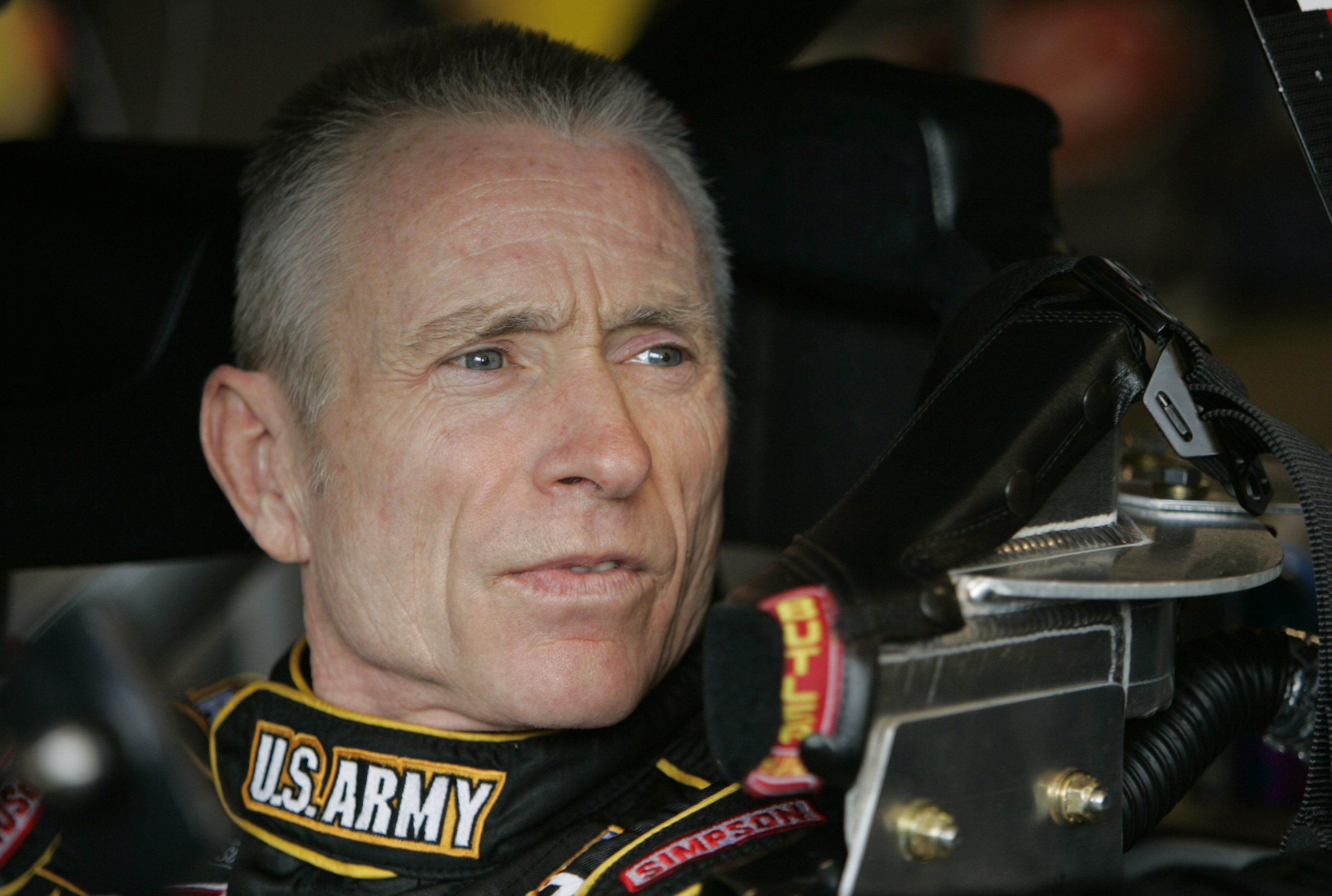
Mark Martin who won the race, and remained the points leader with 5,230 points.

Burton and David Reutimann moved into third and fourth respectively after passing Sadler on lap 199. Five laps later, Martin passed Kurt Busch to claim the lead. On lap 208, Jeff Gordon had fallen to fourteenth position after minor contact with Johnson, while Hamlin and Montoya moved into fourth and sixth positions respectively. Three laps later, Montoya moved into fifth after passing Reutimann. On the 219th lap, Johnson passed Sadler for the seventh position. Nineteen laps later, Johnson passed Montoya to take over fifth, while Hamlin passed Burton to claim the second position. On lap 243, green flag pit stops began, as Martin was the first to pit, handing the lead back to Kurt Busch. On lap 248, Hamlin became the new race leader after Kurt Busch came into pit road. Kevin Harvick drove to pit road due to mechanical problems twenty-one laps later.

On lap 272, Martin reclaimed the lead as the previous leaders had made their pit stops. Four laps later, the eighth caution was given because of debris on the track in turns three and four. Most of the drivers made pit stops during the caution, although Martin stayed out and remained the leader on the lap 283 restart. After the restart on the same lap, the ninth caution was given after Reutimann was battling Earnhardt for fifth position on the inside and made contact with Earnhardt, causing Earnhardt to collide with the barrier between turns three and four. At the lap 288 restart, Martin remained the leader ahead of Kurt Busch. One lap later, Montoya moved up into third after passing Hamlin and Johnson. On lap 289, Montoya passed Kurt Busch at the first turn for the second position. One lap later, Kurt Busch lost a further position when he was passed by Hamlin. On lap 292, Martin had a 1.1-second lead. Two laps later, the tenth caution came out after Allmendinger spun in turn two after he made contact with Marcos Ambrose.

Martin led on the restart on lap 298, followed by Montoya and Hamlin. He was driving on the outside lane and he placed Montoya on the inside to the bottom of the track to halt his momentum. Hamlin overtook Montoya for second during the final lap. On the same lap, Allmendinger lost control of his car at the exit of the fourth turn, and spun sideways on the frontstretch. Allmendinger's car rolled slowly backward and stopped perpendicular to the circuit. Officials waited for most of the last lap to deploy the race's eleventh and final caution, when the race leaders were in-between the third and fourth turns, because they had anticipated Allmendinger being able to drive away before the completion of the race. Allmendinger was able to restart his car just as the race leaders exited the final corner; smoke emitted from Allmendinger's spinning rear tires created visibility issues. Martin was informed of the caution by his spotter and he slowed leaving the final turn as Montoya drove to the inside of Allmendinger. The field was frozen, with the finishing order determined by where the drivers were running at the moment of caution. Thus, Martin achieved his fifth victory of the 2009 season and 40th of his career. Hamlin finished second, with Montoya in third, Johnson in fourth, and Kyle Busch in fifth. Kurt Busch, Newman, Sadler, Biffle and Bowyer rounded out the top ten finishers. There were twenty-eight lead changes among ten different drivers during the race. Montoya led four times for a total of 105 laps, more than any other driver. Martin led twice for a total of 68 laps.

=== Post-race ===
"This is just incredible, Pinch me, I'm sure I'm dreaming. This is my hardest place."

— Martin, speaking after the race.

Martin appeared in victory lane to celebrate his fifth win of the season, in front of 101,000 who attended the race. Martin also earned $232,750 in race winnings. Martin was delighted with his victory: "Alan [Gustafson] won the race, Alan's the man. This is a dream come true. ... We still have the lotto at Talladega [Nov. 1], and [I] think we'll run OK at Martinsville. We finished [seventh] in the spring, but I don't run good there – but this is my hardest place. It's a tough place." Martin also argued that his driving did not cause the final caution: "Once you got the lead, you need to make sure you don't drive it in there and turn it sideways (and) slide it up the racetrack. I mean, how stupid would I look then?" Hamlin commented that he was at a disadvantage when restarting on the outside lane but that finishing second made him "pretty proud". Montoya was somewhat frustrated with the result, saying: "Martin just screwed me – he just stopped the car on the apex, right on the bottom, and I had nowhere to go," Montoya said. "I could have pushed him out of the way ... but I respect him a lot."

Drivers expressed their concerns over the finish of the race. Gordon said that he was not told that a caution was deployed, "I saw the caution out of the corner of my eye. I said, 'I never heard the caution' and [my spotter] said, 'That's because it didn't come out until just now,' and I was surprised by that." Johnson felt that the caution should have been brought out earlier. He said that he did not know whose fault it was but suggested that a caution alert system with a small yellow light illuminating inside the car when a caution is deployed similar to that in Formula One be implemented to avoid such situations in the future. Martin commented that Hamlin and Montoya who were behind him did not appear to be aware of the situation, adding, "I was under the impression that when a caution [was] called, the race was over. I don't think the guys [who] gave up the race behind me quit, so it caused a little bit of chaos." NASCAR spokesperson Ramsey R. Poston stated that NASCAR waited as long as possible to allow for the race to end until the caution was deployed. Robin Pemberton, NASCAR's vice-president of competition, said that the organization disliked concluding events under caution and that they waited for as long as possible to avoid affecting the race's result.

The race result kept Martin in the lead of the Drivers' Championship with 5,230 points. Hamlin moved into second, tied on points with Johnson on 5,195, twenty points ahead of Montoya and thirty ahead of Kurt Busch. Chevrolet maintained their Manufacturers' Championship lead with 199 points. Toyota remained second with 160 points. Dodge moved to third with 118 and Ford fell to fourth with 117. There were 5.04 million television viewers. The race took three hours, nine minutes and one second to complete; because it ended under caution, no margin of victory was recorded.

Three days after the race, Joe Gibbs Racing were given penalties for Kyle Busch's car. Joe Gibbs Racing's penalty, for unauthorized alterations to the ride height of Kyle Busch's car, included a fine of $25,000 for crew chief Steve Addington, and the loss of 25 owner and driver points for Joe Gibbs and Kyle Busch respectively. Addington was also placed on probation until December 31, 2009. The team clarified that the left-front spring on Kyle Busch's car became dislodged and this caused the car's left-front quarter to run lower than usual; it required an alteration to the vehicle's handling to compensate for the change. They accepted NASCAR decision on the problem. Kyle Busch's standing in the Drivers' Championship was unaffected.

=== Race results ===
Pos	Car	Driver	Team	Manufacturer	Laps run	Points
1	5	Mark Martin	Hendrick Motorsports	Chevrolet	300	190^{1}
2	11	Denny Hamlin	Joe Gibbs Racing	Toyota	300	175^{1}
3	42	Juan Pablo Montoya	Earnhardt Ganassi Racing	Chevrolet	300	175^{2}
4	48	Jimmie Johnson	Hendrick Motorsports	Chevrolet	300	165^{1}
5	18	Kyle Busch	Joe Gibbs Racing	Toyota	300	155
6	2	Kurt Busch	Penske Championship Racing	Dodge	300	155^{1}
7	39	Ryan Newman	Stewart–Haas Racing	Chevrolet	300	151^{1}
8	19	Elliott Sadler	Richard Petty Motorsports	Dodge	300	142
9	16	Greg Biffle	Roush Fenway Racing	Ford	300	138
10	33	Clint Bowyer	Richard Childress Racing	Chevrolet	300	134
11	83	Brian Vickers	Red Bull Racing Team	Toyota	300	130
12	00	David Reuitmann	Michael Waltrip Racing	Toyota	300	127
13	07	Casey Mears	Richard Childress Racing	Chevrolet	300	124
14	14	Tony Stewart	Stewart–Haas Racing	Chevrolet	300	126^{1}
15	24	Jeff Gordon	Hendrick Motorsports	Chevrolet	300	118
16	31	Jeff Burton	Richard Childress Racing	Chevrolet	300	115
17	99	Carl Edwards	Roush Fenway Racing	Ford	300	117^{1}
18	26	Jamie McMurray	Roush Fenway Racing	Ford	300	109
19	1	Martin Truex Jr.	Earnhardt Ganassi Racing	Chevrolet	300	106
20	47	Marcos Ambrose	JTG Daughterty Racing	Toyota	300	108^{1}
21	20	Joey Logano	Joe Gibbs Racing	Toyota	300	100
22	71	Bobby Labonte	TRG Motorsports	Chevrolet	300	102^{1}
23	17	Matt Kenseth	Roush Fenway Racing	Ford	300	94
24	7	Robby Gordon	Robby Gordon Motorsports	Toyota	300	91
25	44	A. J. Allmendinger	Richard Petty Motorsports	Dodge	299	88
26	34	John Andretti	Front Row Motorsports	Chevrolet	299	85
27	55	Michael Waltrip	Michael Waltrip Motorsports	Toyota	298	82
28	12	David Stremme	Penske Racing	Dodge	298	79
29	09	Aric Almirola	Phoenix Racing	Dodge	297	76
30	96	Erik Darnell	Hall of Fame Racing	Ford	297	73
31	82	Scott Speed	Red Bull Racing Team	Toyota	297	70
32	29	Kevin Harvick	Richard Childress Racing	Chevrolet	295	67
33	6	David Ragan	Roush Fenway Racing	Ford	287	64
34	98	Paul Menard	Robert Yates Racing	Ford	287	61
35	88	Dale Earnhardt Jr.	Hendrick Motorsports	Chevrolet	283	58
36	43	Reed Sorenson	Richard Petty Motorsports	Dodge	263	55
37	77	Sam Hornish Jr.	Team Penske	Dodge	162	52
38	9	Kasey Kahne	Richard Petty Motorsports	Dodge	66	49
39	64	Mike Wallace	Gunselman Motorsports	Toyota	48	46
40	87	Joe Nemechek	NEMCO Motorsports	Toyota	41	43
41	36	Michael McDowell	Tommy Baldwin Racing	Toyota	36	40
42	66	Dave Blaney	Prism Motorsports	Toyota	23	37
43	37	Tony Raines	Front Row Motorsports	Dodge	8	34
sources:

- ^{1} Includes five bonus points for leading a lap
- ^{2} Includes ten bonus points for leading the most laps

== Standings after the race ==
Drivers' Championship standings

Pos	+/–	Driver	Points
1		Mark Martin	5,230
2	1	Jimmie Johnson	5,195 (−35)
3	1	Denny Hamlin	5,195 (−35)
4	7	Juan Pablo Montoya	5,175 (−55)
5	2	Kurt Busch	5,165 (−65)
6	2	Tony Stewart	5,156 (−74)
7	3	Ryan Newman	5,151 (−79)
8		Brian Vickers	5,140 (−90)
9	3	Greg Biffle	5,138 (−92)
10	4	Jeff Gordon	5,128 (−102)
11	2	Carl Edwards	5,117 (−113)
12	7	Kasey Kahne	5,069 (−161)

Manufacturers' Championship standings

Pos	+/–	Manufacturer	Points
1		Chevrolet	199
2		Toyota	160 (−39)
3		Dodge	118 (−81)
4		Ford	117 (−82)

- Note: Only the top twelve positions are included for the driver standings. These drivers qualified for the Chase for the Sprint Cup.

Previous race: 2009 Chevy Rock & Roll 400	Sprint Cup Series; 2009 season	Next race: 2009 AAA 400
