= 2009 Lenox Industrial Tools 301 =

Race details
- Race 17 of 36 in the 2009 NASCAR Sprint Cup Series
- Layout of New Hampshire Motor Speedway
- Date: June 28, 2009
- Official name: Lenox Industrial Tools 301
- Location: Loudon, New Hampshire
- Course: New Hampshire Motor Speedway
- Course length: 1.058 miles (1.703 km)
- Distance: 273 laps, 288.834 mi (464.833 km)
- Scheduled distance: 301 laps, 318.458 mi (512.508 km)
- Weather: Temperatures up to 82 °F (28 °C); wind speeds up to 11.39 miles per hour (18.33 km/h)
- Average speed: 97.497 miles per hour (156.906 km/h)

Pole position
Driver	Tony Stewart	Stewart–Haas Racing
- Time: N/A

Most laps led
Driver	Jimmie Johnson	Hendrick Motorsports
- Laps: 93

Winner
No. 20	Joey Logano	Joe Gibbs Racing

Television in the United States
- Network: Turner Network Television
- Announcers: Ralph Sheheen, Wally Dallenbach Jr., Kyle Petty
- Nielsen ratings: 4.1 (Final); 3.5/9 (Overnight); (5.555 million)

The 2009 Lenox Industrial Tools 301 was the 17th stock car race of the 2009 NASCAR Sprint Cup Series. It was held on June 28, 2009, in Loudon, New Hampshire, at New Hampshire Motor Speedway. 101,000 people attended the race. Joe Gibbs Racing driver Joey Logano won the rain-shortened 273-lap race starting from the 24th position in his first career win. Jeff Gordon of Hendrick Motorsports was second, with Penske Racing's Kurt Busch third.

Tony Stewart was awarded the pole position after qualifying was rained out and the starting order was determined by owners' points. He was immediately passed by Gordon at the start of the race. Busch took the first position on lap seven, before Gordon retook it on the 20th lap. Gordon lost the lead to Busch twelve laps later. Jimmie Johnson assumed the lead on lap 50, and maintained it for the following 73 laps. He led another 20 laps for a total of 93 laps, more than any other driver. His teammate Gordon re-assumed the lead following a caution period on the 159th lap and maintained it until Stewart passed him on lap 196. Bobby Labonte led laps 238 to 247 before Ryan Newman became the leader on lap 247. Logano took over first place sixteen laps later when Newman made a pit stop for fuel. The race ended early on the 273rd lap due to earlier rain and Logano was declared the winner. There were 11 cautions and 21 lead changes amongst 14 drivers during the event.

It was Logano's first victory in the Cup Series; at the age of 19 years, 1 month and 4 days, he became the youngest driver in series history to win a race. After the race, Gordon lowered Stewart's advantage in the Drivers' Championship from 84 to 69 points. Johnson, Busch and Edwards rounded out the top five. Chevrolet maintained the Manufacturers' Championship lead with 126 points, 32 ahead of Toyota, 46 in front of Ford, and 52 ahead of Dodge with 19 races to go in the season. The race attracted 5.555 million television viewers.

== Background ==
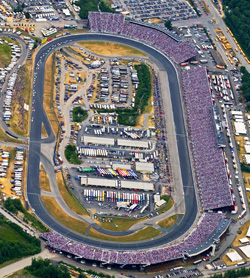
New Hampshire Motor Speedway, where the race was held.

The 2009 Lenox Industrial Tools 301 was the 17th of 36 scheduled stock car races of the 2009 NASCAR Sprint Cup Series. It was held on June 28, 2009, in Loudon, New Hampshire, at New Hampshire Motor Speedway, an intermediate track that holds NASCAR races. The New Hampshire Motor Speedway is a four-turn 1.058 mi (1.703 km) oval track. Its turns are banked at two to seven degrees; both the front stretch (the finish line) and the back stretch are banked at one degree.

Before the race, Tony Stewart led the Drivers' Championship with 2,364 points, followed by Jeff Gordon with 2,280 points. Jimmie Johnson was third with 2,207 points, Kurt Busch was fourth with 2,084 points, and Carl Edwards fifth with 2,051 points. Ryan Newman, Denny Hamlin, Greg Biffle, Kyle Busch, Matt Kenseth, Mark Martin, and Juan Pablo Montoya rounded out the top twelve drivers. Chevrolet led the Manufacturers' Championship with 120 points, 35 points ahead of Toyota in second place. Third-placed Ford had 77 points, and was seven points in front of Dodge in the fourth position. Kurt Busch was the race's defending champion.

Ahead of the event, the organizers expanded the track's infield section to make more than 400 percent usable land available. Safety changes increased the track's catch fences near the grandstands to more than 21 ft (6.4 m) high with the installation of wheel fence arch posts. Six strands of 5/8 in (16 mm), high-strength cable supported its lower section, and sixteen strands of 3/8 in (9.5 mm) cable composed the upper section.

Ted Christopher, a driver who had last started a Cup Series race in the 2006 season, would attempt to qualify for Kirk Shelmerdine Racing. It would be his first time driving the Car of Tomorrow; he had previously competed for the team in three previous races at New Hampshire Motor Speedway. Christopher said he was looking forward to compete in the event and was asked by team owner Kirk Shelmerdine to undergo a seat fitting, "I went over to see him last weekend when I was [in North Carolina]. He said come over and try the seat in the car. It fit good and he called me on Monday and said they he [sic] had got a sponsor and wanted me to run his car. I'm looking forward to it. I think I've made the race for him every time we've tried to qualify at New Hampshire."

== Practice and qualifying ==
Three practice sessions were held before the Sunday race—one on Friday, and two on Saturday. The first session lasted 90 minutes, the second 50 minutes, and the third 60 minutes. During the first practice session, Kurt Busch was fastest with a 29.149 seconds lap, ahead of David Reutimann in second and Montoya third. Johnson, Reed Sorenson, Denny Hamlin, Martin Truex Jr., Kyle Busch, Clint Bowyer and Joey Logano filled positions three to ten. During the session, Stewart lost control of his car, and crashed into the wall at turn two, causing heavy damage to the rear of his car. He used a back-up car for the rest of the session; his team prepared to take the primary car's engine into the back-up vehicle before the race. Martin made contact with a barrier between turns three and four and spun; he sustained no major vehicular damage.

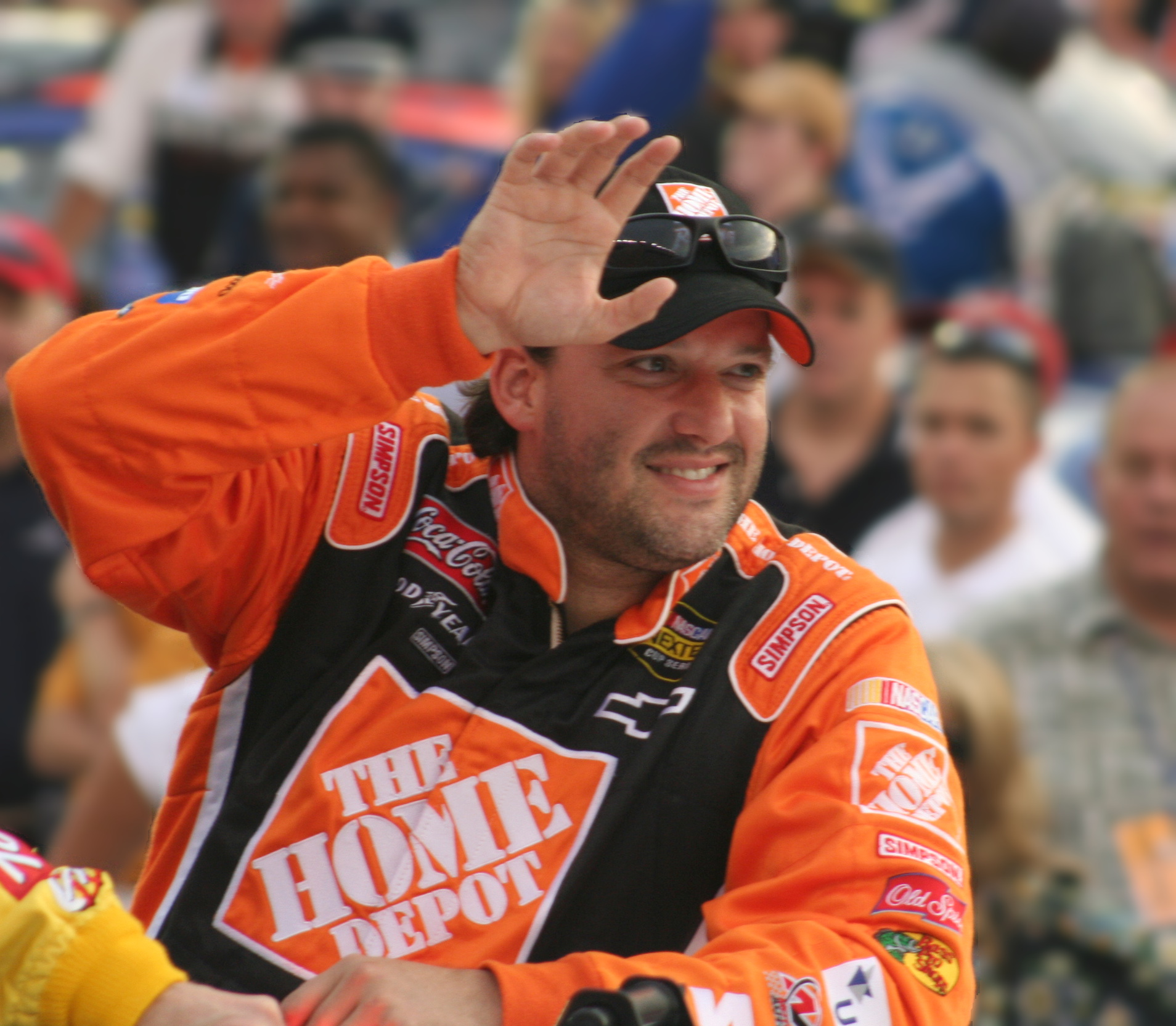
Tony Stewart (pictured in 2007) was awarded pole position after rain caused qualifying to be canceled.

A total of 46 drivers entered qualifying on Friday afternoon; due to NASCAR's qualifying procedure, 43 could race. Each driver ran two laps, with pole position to 42nd determined by the competitor's fastest speeds. 43rd position was awarded to the most recent series champion or the next fastest qualifier. Heavy rain caused NASCAR officials to cancel qualifying and used owner points to determine the starting order. Stewart had his second pole position at New Hampshire Motor Speedway. He was joined on the grid's front row by Gordon. Johnson, Kurt Busch, Edwards, Ryan Newman, Hamlin, Biffle, Kyle Busch and Kenseth were in positions three to ten. The three drivers who did not qualify were Dexter Bean, Christopher and Mike Wallace; Regan Smith qualified 43rd after Wallace's team withdrew from the event.

On Saturday morning, Sorenson was quickest in the second practice session with a time of 29.647 seconds. Positions two to ten were occupied by Joe Nemechek, Casey Mears, Truex, Reutimann, Johnson, Montoya, Jeff Burton, Kurt Busch and Kevin Harvick. Later that day, Truex led the third practice session with a 29.713 seconds lap. Johnson, Biffle, Sorenson, Martin, Harvick. Montoya, Kurt Busch, Reutimann and Bobby Labonte were in positions two to ten.

=== Qualifying results ===
Grid	No.	Driver	Team	Manufacturer	Reason
1	14	Tony Stewart	Stewart–Haas Racing	Chevrolet	1st in Owners' Points
2	24	Jeff Gordon	Hendrick Motorsports	Chevrolet	2nd in Owners' Points
3	48	Jimmie Johnson	Hendrick Motorsports	Chevrolet	3rd in Owners' Points
4	2	Kurt Busch	Penske Racing	Dodge	4th in Owners' Points
5	99	Carl Edwards	Roush Fenway Racing	Ford	5th in Owners' Points
6	39	Ryan Newman	Stewart–Haas Racing	Chevrolet	6th in Owners' Points
7	11	Denny Hamlin	Joe Gibbs Racing	Toyota	7th in Owners' Points
8	16	Greg Biffle	Roush Fenway Racing	Ford	8th in Owners' Points
9	18	Kyle Busch	Joe Gibbs Racing	Toyota	9th in Owners' Points
10	17	Matt Kenseth	Roush Fenway Racing	Ford	10th in Owners' Points
11	5	Mark Martin	Hendrick Motorsports	Chevrolet	11th in Owners' Points
12	42	Juan Pablo Montoya	Earnhardt Ganassi Racing	Chevrolet	12th in Owners' Points
13	9	Kasey Kahne	Richard Petty Motorsports	Dodge	13th in Owners' Points
14	00	David Reutimann	Michael Waltrip Racing	Toyota	14th in Owners' Points
15	31	Jeff Burton	Richard Childress Racing	Chevrolet	15th in Owners' Points
16	33	Clint Bowyer	Richard Childress Racing	Chevrolet	16th in Owners' Points
17	83	Brian Vickers	Red Bull Racing Team	Toyota	17th in Owners' Points
18	47	Marcos Ambrose	JTG Daugherty Racing	Toyota	18th in Owners' Points
19	26	Jamie McMurray	Roush Fenway Racing	Ford	19th in Owners' Points
20	88	Dale Earnhardt Jr.	Hendrick Motorsports	Chevrolet	20th in Owners' Points
21	07	Casey Mears	Richard Childress Racing	Chevrolet	21st in Owners' Points
22	1	Martin Truex Jr.	Earnhardt Ganassi Racing	Chevrolet	22nd in Owners' Points
23	19	Elliott Sadler	Richard Petty Motorsports	Dodge	23rd in Owners' Points
24	20	Joey Logano	Joe Gibbs Racing	Toyota	24th in Owners' Points
25	29	Kevin Harvick	Richard Childress Racing	Chevrolet	25th in Owners' Points
26	77	Sam Hornish Jr.	Penske Racing	Dodge	26th in Owners' Points
27	43	Reed Sorenson	Richard Petty Motorsports	Dodge	27th in Owners' Points
28	96	Bobby Labonte	Hall of Fame Racing	Ford	28th in Owners' Points
29	55	Michael Waltrip	Michael Waltrip Racing	Toyota	29th in Owners' Points
30	44	A. J. Allmendinger	Richard Petty Motorsports	Dodge	30th in Owners' Points
31	6	David Ragan	Roush Fenway Racing	Ford	31st in Owners' Points
32	12	David Stremme	Penske Racing	Dodge	32nd in Owners' Points
33	98	Paul Menard	Yates Racing	Ford	33rd in Owners' Points
34	7	Robby Gordon	Robby Gordon Motorsports	Toyota	34th in Owners' Points
35	34	John Andretti	Front Row Motorsports	Chevrolet	35th in Owners' Points
36	09	Brad Keselowski	Phoenix Racing	Chevrolet	Past race winner in the 2009 season
37	82	Scott Speed	Red Bull Racing Team	Toyota	16 attempts, 36th in Owners' Points
38	71	David Gilliland	TRG Motorsports	Chevrolet	16 attempts, 37th in Owners' Points
39	87	Joe Nemechek	NEMCO Motorsports	Toyota	16 attempts, 38th in Owners' Points
40	66	Dave Blaney	Prism Motorsports	Toyota	16 attempts, 41st in Owners' Points
41	36	Patrick Carpentier	Tommy Baldwin Racing	Toyota	16 attempts, 42nd in Owners' Points
42	37	Tony Raines	Front Row Motorsports	Dodge	9 attempts, 50th in Owners' Points
43	78	Regan Smith	Furniture Row Racing	Chevrolet	8 attempts, 40th in Owners' Points
Failed to qualify
44	51	Dexter Bean	BlackJack Racing	Dodge	5 attempts, 51st in Owners' Points
45	27	Ted Christopher	Kirk Shelmerdine Racing	Toyota	2 attempts, 57th in Owners' Points
46	64	Mike Wallace	Gunselman Motorsports	Toyota	11 attempts, 49th in Owners' Points
The starting order was determined by owner's points after rain cancelled qualifying.

== Race ==
Live television coverage of the race began at 12:30 p.m. EDT in the United States on TNT. Around the start of the race, weather conditions were cloudy with the air temperature at 68 °F (20 °C) and the track temperature at 89 °F (32 °C); a chance of rain showers was forecast. Billy Mauldin, the president and CEO of Motor Racing Outreach began pre-race ceremonies by giving the invocation. The 2009 Miss New Hampshire Lindsey Graham performed the United States National Anthem with Denise Doucette singing the National Anthem of Canada. The winner of a sponsored sweepstakes competition Pete Dingeman commanded the drivers to start their engines. NASCAR announced that a competition caution would take place on lap 35 due to the forecasted rain, requiring drivers to undertake mandatory pit stops for tire wear analysis. No driver fell to the rear of the field for the beginning of the event.

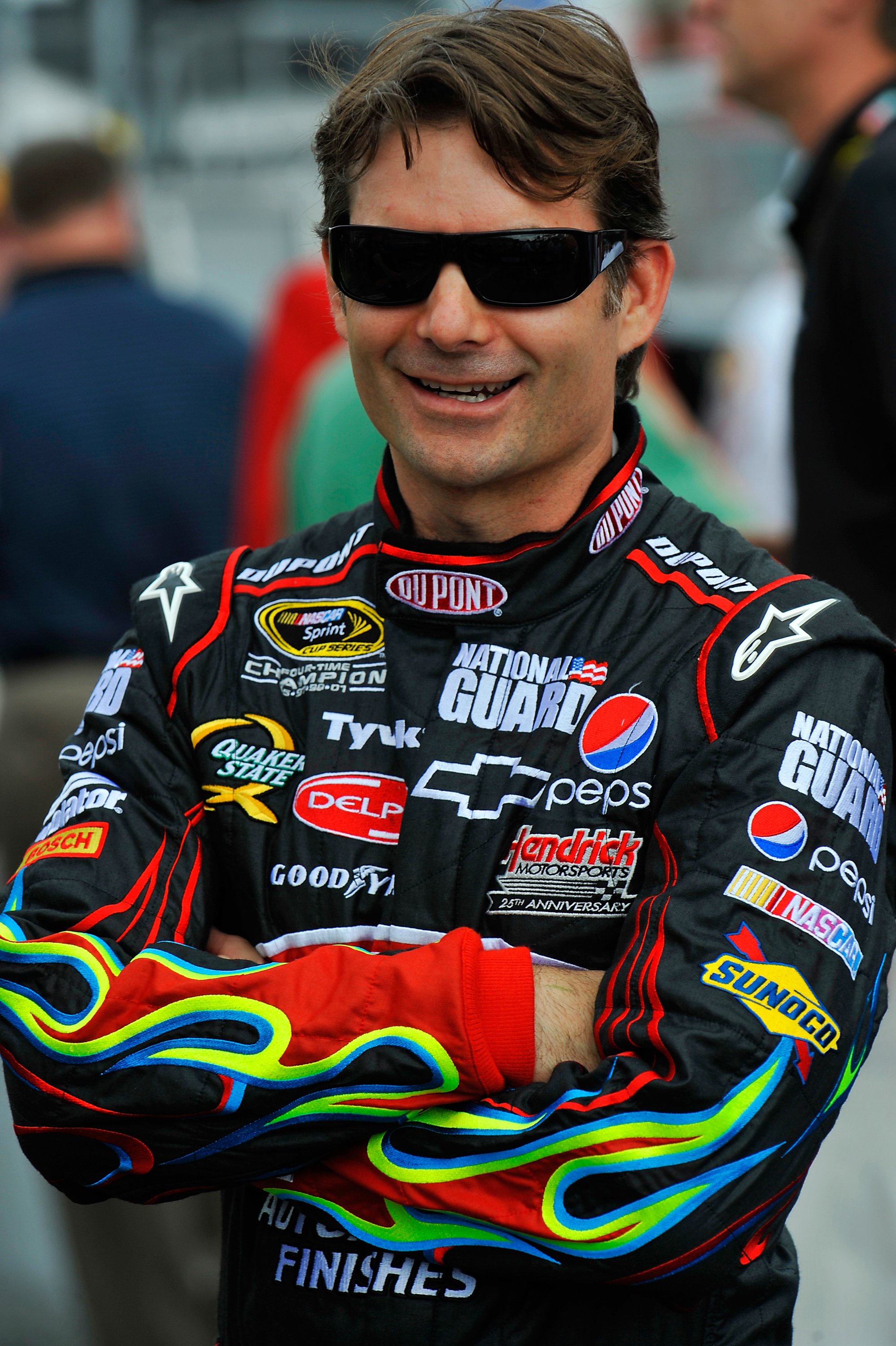
Jeff Gordon led early on and finished the race in the second position.

The race began at 2:16 p.m. local time. Jeff Gordon passed Stewart on the outside at the exit of the second turn. Stewart lost two further places further on in the lap. On the second lap, Kurt Busch began challenging Jeff Gordon for the first position, as Stewart dropped to fifth. Edwards moved past Stewart for sixth at the end of lap three. Biffle took third from Newman at turn three on lap four, as Kurt Busch continued his attempts to pass Gordon on the same lap. Kyle Busch fell to tenth when Montoya passed him on lap six. Kurt Busch overtook Jeff Gordon at the first turn for the lead on lap seven. Biffle passed Jeff Gordon for second place one lap later. On lap 16, Patrick Carpentier hit the outside wall at turn four due to a broken brake line, causing the first caution. Some drivers made pit stops for tires under caution.

The race restarted on lap 20, with Jeff Gordon passing Kurt Busch on the outside lane at the fourth turn to retake the lead. On the 21st lap, the second caution was waved; Jamie McMurray was hit from behind by Harvick, sending him into the turn four barrier after losing traction in his car. McMurray struck the wall with his vehicle's rear. Under caution, some drivers again made pit stops. Jeff Gordon maintained the lead at the lap 26 restart. A third caution came out on the following lap. A. J. Allmendinger spun in turn two. This and the following cautions prompted NASCAR to move the competition caution to lap 45, as some drivers again made pit stops under caution. Racing resumed on lap 32, with Kurt Busch overtaking Jeff Gordon on the outside to regain the lead. On lap 41, Reutimann overtook Newman for eighth place. Newman lost the ninth position to Martin who was on the inside line two laps later. On lap 44, Stewart passed Truex for 14th. That same lap, Johnson progressed to the fifth position.

The competition caution was waved on the 46th lap. Elliott Sadler staggered his pit stop, allowing him to lead lap 48. After the pit stops, Jeff Gordon returned to the first position for the lap 50 restart. Johnson overtook his teammate Jeff Gordon on the inside for the lead on the lap. Biffle made contact with a barrier at the outside of turn four on lap 53. Three laps later, Kurt Busch passed Martin to move into fourth. On the 60th lap, Sadler lost control of his car in the second turn, hitting Scott Speed's vehicle. That sent Speed into Michael Waltrip, who hit the wall, and Robby Gordon spun in avoidance, necessitating the fifth caution. During the caution, 16 drivers made pit stops. Johnson led at the restart on lap 64, followed by his teammate Jeff Gordon and Kyle Busch. On the next lap, Stewart progressed to fourth on the inside line. Kyle Busch fell to fourth when Jeff Gordon and Stewart overtook him on lap 66. On lap 72, Kenseth passed Bowyer for the tenth position. Edwards turned left to pass Kenseth for 14th 21 laps later. By the 100th lap, Jeff Gordon lowered his teammate Johnson's lead from 2.1 seconds to half a second in slower traffic.

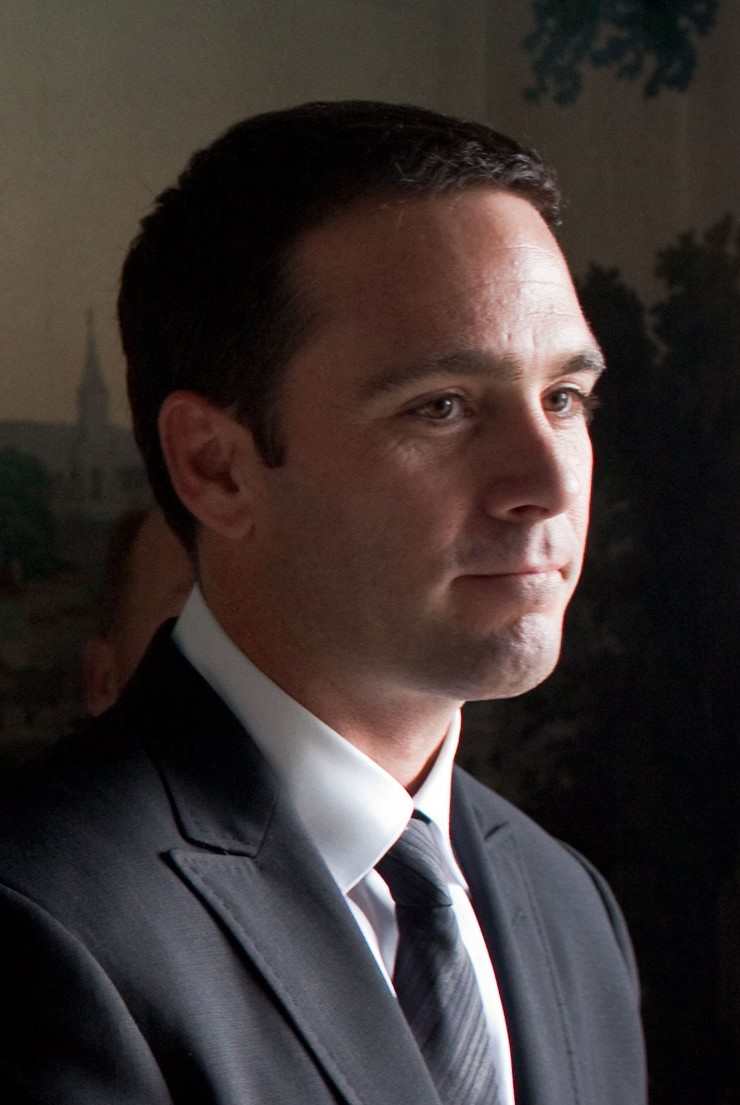
Jimmie Johnson, who finished in ninth, led a race-high 93 laps

Truex lost 12th place to Montoya 14 laps later. Green flag pit stops began on the 119th lap. Johnson made his pit stop four laps later, handing the lead to Montoya, who held it for seven laps until his own stop. Hamlin, Sorenson, and Robby Gordon each staggered their pit stops, leading one lap each. After the pit stops, Johnson regained the lead. Between laps 145 and 148, Martin and Burton passed Kyle Busch on the inside for seventh and eighth. On lap 151, a sixth caution came out because debris was located in turn two. Several drivers including Johnson made pit stops for tires during the caution. Johnson stalled in the pit road entry and fell to third. His teammate Jeff Gordon led at the lap 159 restart. Leaving the second turn, Jeff Gordon, Johnson, and Kurt Busch ran three abreast; Gordon kept the lead. Two laps later, Dale Earnhardt Jr. used a battle between Jeff Gordon and Kurt Busch to move into second on the inside line. Rain was reported during the 162nd lap; NASCAR officials deemed the track safe.

On lap 164, Johnson got loose on the exit to turn four and avoided hitting a wall. He fell to sixth, behind Stewart and Truex. Five laps later, Paul Menard locked his left-front tire, and he crashed into the turn three wall, prompting the seventh caution. Most drivers stayed on the track during the caution. Racing resumed on lap 175 as Jeff Gordon maintained the lead. On the lap, a multi-car accident triggered the eighth caution and then a 16-minute red flag for track clearing. After Earnhardt spun his tires, Truex was hit from behind by an unsighted Kyle Busch into turn one, collecting Burton, Harvick, Mears, Reutimann, Brian Vickers, David Ragan and McMurray. None of the leaders made pit stops when driving resumed. At the end of lap 180, the race resumed with Jeff Gordon leading Kurt Busch and Stewart. Newman continued after he struck a wall on lap 181. On the 183rd lap, Logano's left rear tire burst from contact with Newman and Reutimann between turns three and four; its carcass tore through his car's sheet metal, and he spun near the pit road entrance. The ninth caution came out due to debris on the track. Logano was sent to the end of the longest line for entering pit road when it was closed and for speeding in it.

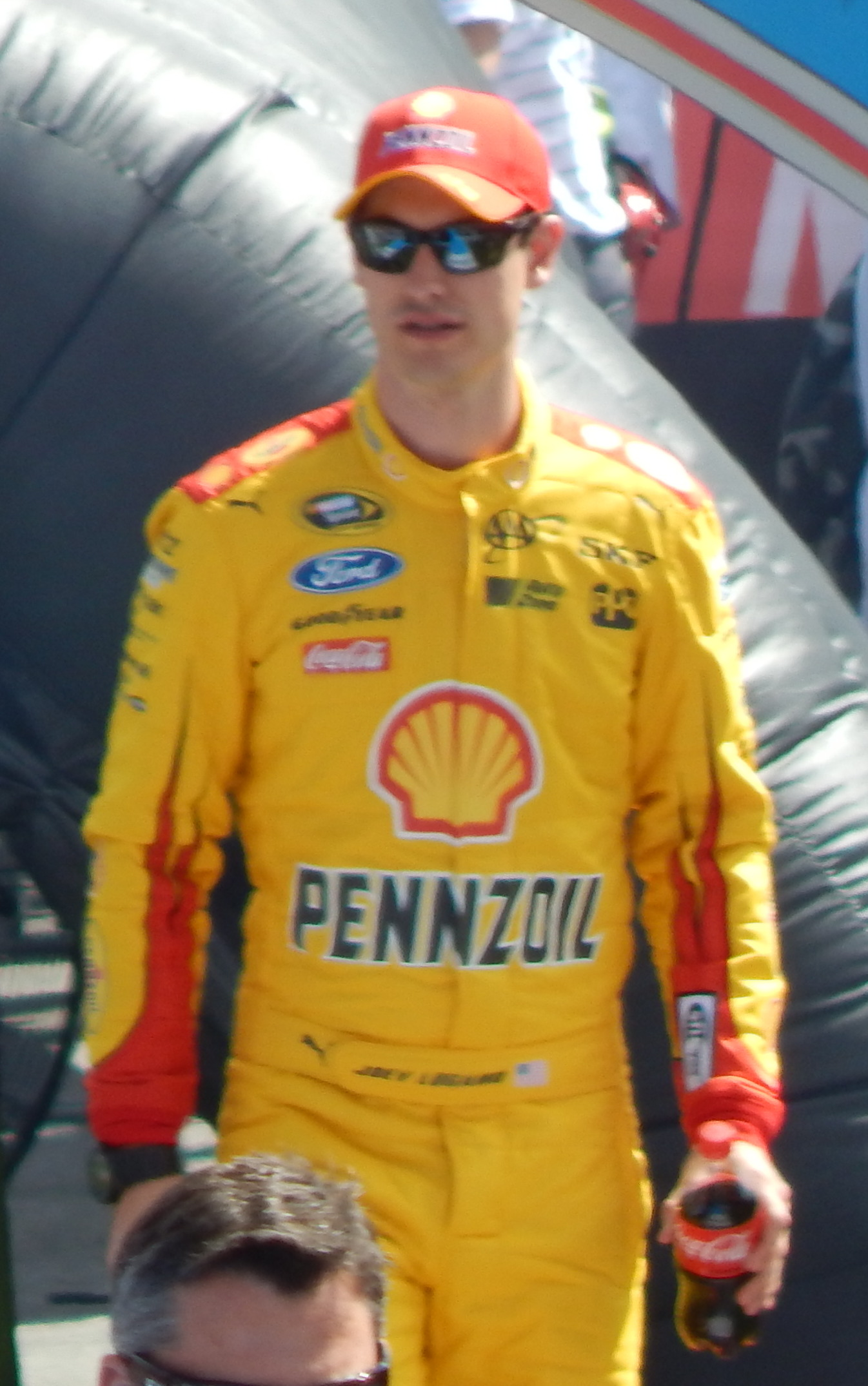
Joey Logano (pictured in 2015) took his first career victory and became the youngest driver to win a Cup Series race.

Jeff Gordon maintained the lead at the lap 188 restart. Two laps later, Speed collided with a wall between turns one and two, prompting the tenth caution. The leaders remained on the circuit during the caution. Jeff Gordon held the first position from Stewart at the 196th lap restart. Stewart overtook Jeff Gordon at turn two to assume the lead. Earnhardt moved in front of Kahne for eighth on lap 203. Eight laps later, Johnson passed Earnhardt for the eighth position. Earnhardt lost a further position to Kahne on the 216th lap. By lap 218, Stewart's lead had reduced and Jeff Gordon was close behind. Stewart increased his advantage to 1.1 seconds nine laps later. On lap 231, Martin lost seventh to Johnson. The leaders made pit stops for car adjustments four laps later, handing the lead to Martin and later Biffle. One of Stewart's crew members dropped a lug nut for the right-front wheel at his pit stop. Labonte led laps 238 to 247 before he made his pit stop, promoting Newman to first place. Newman stayed out because his team believed rain would fall. On lap 259, Jeff Gordon overtook Reutimann for third. Four laps later, Newman was low on fuel, necessitating a pit stop.

Logano took the lead after his crew chief Greg Zipadelli instructed him to remain on track as the driver was about to enter pit road for fuel. As Logano was due to make his final pit stop on lap 278, rain showers necessitated the eleventh caution on lap 266. Pace car driver Brett Bodine reported that the rain was falling more heavily on the backstretch. Six laps later, a NASCAR official in turn two reported a saturated track as the rain stopped. Logano switched off his engine to conserve fuel. The race was stopped for a second time on lap 273 out of a scheduled 301. All cars parked on pit road and jet dryers circulated the track to clear water. The race was ended at 5:42 p.m. local time because of the rain. This gave Logano the victory, his first in the Cup Series. At 19 years, 1 month, and 4 days, he was the youngest driver to win a Cup Series race. Logano bested Kyle Busch's record of 20 years, four months, and two days in the 2005 Sony HD 500 at Auto Club Speedway. Jeff Gordon finished second, Kurt Busch third, Reutimann fourth, and Stewart fifth. Brad Keselowski, Kyle Busch, Sam Hornish Jr., Johnson and Kahne completed the top ten. There were 21 lead changes among 14 drivers during the race. Johnson's 93 laps lead was more than any other driver. Logano led once for a total of ten laps.

=== Post-race ===
"Now ... you have to listen to people say how you lucked into the whole deal. In the end, I hope he enjoys it because a win is a win and I don't think any less of mine because it's a rain-shortened race, so he shouldn't (either)."

— David Reutimann on Logano's first career victory.

Logano appeared in Victory Lane to celebrate his first career victory in front of a crowd of 101,000 people; the win earned him $276,201. He said of becoming the first rookie driver to win in 71 races, "This is so special, I think your first win no matter where it is is huge. Obviously it's not the way you want to win your first race, in the rain, but 20 years down the road when you look in the record books, no one will know the difference. I'll take them any way I can." Jeff Gordon spoke of his happiness that he could challenge for the victory, "I wasn't very good on the restarts and those guys there, the #2 [Busch] and the #14 [Stewart] and the #48 [Johnson] got me but I could ride right there with him. Then my pit crew, they did the job in the pits and they were phenomenal and got us out front." Kurt Busch commented on his third-place finish, "Overall, last year, to drive into Victory Lane and do it in a rain-shortened race and today to have it where we were fast enough to win and not get the win, you know, that's how this sport evens itself out. You have your good and your bad luck."

The event was the third in 2009 after the Daytona 500 and the Coca-Cola 600 to be stopped by inclement weather conditions. Since NASCAR began implementing a television network contract in 2001, the start times of most daytime races were moved to begin later in the day. Kurt Busch said having a consistent start time for races would have potentially allowed competitors to complete all the event's scheduled laps, "If we had a consistent time for our races, that would be better for our fans. That would create more viewership knowing that they knew when to find the race." Ramsey R. Poston, spokesperson for NASCAR, said the organization supported the idea of consistent times for the start of races. He planned to talk about the idea with the sport's broadcasters.

Kyle Busch apologized for causing the eight-car crash that stopped the race on lap 175, "I got into Martin and I hate it for him and Jeff Burton and those guys. It was just hard racing on a restart. It looked like the 88 spun his tires a little bit. I went to the middle to go for a lane and these double-file restarts everything is so tight anyways and I just got into the 1 a little bit there and got him sideways." Vickers stated Kyle Busch should have been disqualified after he reviewed video footage of the accident in the care center, "That's the second week in a row that stupidity has cost us a race, and it's frustrating." Truex said he felt Kyle Busch should have slowed, "Kyle just lost his head like he usually does when something bad happens. He decided he wasn't going to lift, he was going to turn me on the straightaway for no good reason at all." Burton said he felt the accident was a consequence of NASCAR's rules on double-file restarts, "I don't think the fans want to see more wrecks. But they want to see more aggressive racing so that is the product of that. You can't change something without there being some kind of negative consequences and this is an example."

Stewart continued to lead the Drivers' Championship with 2,524 points, as Jeff Gordon lowered his advantage to 69 points. Johnson maintained third with 2,355 points, Kurt Busch kept fourth with 2,254 points, and Edwards was fifth with 2,157 points. Hamlin passed Ryan Newman for seventh, and Kyle Busch scored more points than Biffle to take over eighth. Kenseth, Martin and Montoya rounded out the top twelve. Chevrolet maintained its lead in the Manufacturers' Championship with 126 points. Toyota followed in second with 94 points. With 80 points, Ford was ahead of Dodge in fourth with 74 points. The race had a television audience of 5.555 million. It took two hours, 57 minutes, and 45 seconds to complete; because it concluded under caution, no margin of victory was recorded.

=== Race results ===
Pos	No.	Driver	Team	Manufacturer	Laps	Points
1	20	Joey Logano	Joe Gibbs Racing	Toyota	273	190^{1}
2	24	Jeff Gordon	Hendrick Motorsports	Chevrolet	273	175^{1}
3	2	Kurt Busch	Penske Racing	Dodge	273	170^{1}
4	00	David Reutimann	Michael Waltrip Racing	Toyota	273	160
5	14	Tony Stewart	Stewart–Haas Racing	Chevrolet	273	160^{1}
6	09	Brad Keselowski	Phoenix Racing	Chevrolet	273	150
7	18	Kyle Busch	Joe Gibbs Racing	Toyota	273	146
8	77	Sam Hornish Jr.	Penske Racing	Dodge	273	142
9	48	Jimmie Johnson	Hendrick Motorsports	Chevrolet	273	148^{2}
10	9	Kasey Kahne	Richard Petty Motorsports	Dodge	273	134
11	07	Casey Mears	Richard Childress Racing	Chevrolet	273	130
12	42	Juan Pablo Montoya	Earnhardt Ganassi Racing	Chevrolet	273	132^{1}
13	88	Dale Earnhardt Jr.	Hendrick Motorsports	Chevrolet	273	124
14	5	Mark Martin	Hendrick Motorsports	Chevrolet	273	126^{1}
15	11	Denny Hamlin	Joe Gibbs Racing	Toyota	273	123^{1}
16	34	John Andretti	Front Row Motorsports	Chevrolet	273	115
17	43	Reed Sorenson	Richard Petty Motorsports	Dodge	273	117^{1}
18	16	Greg Biffle	Roush Fenway Racing	Ford	273	114^{1}
19	99	Carl Edwards	Roush Fenway Racing	Ford	273	106
20	33	Clint Bowyer	Richard Childress Racing	Chevrolet	273	103
21	96	Bobby Labonte	Hall of Fame Racing	Ford	273	105^{1}
22	17	Matt Kenseth	Roush Fenway Racing	Ford	273	97
23	47	Marcos Ambrose	JTG Daugherty Racing	Toyota	273	94
24	55	Michael Waltrip	Michael Waltrip Racing	Toyota	273	91
25	7	Robby Gordon	Robby Gordon Motorsports	Toyota	272	93^{1}
26	19	Elliott Sadler	Richard Petty Motorsports	Dodge	272	90^{1}
27	78	Regan Smith	Furniture Row Racing	Chevrolet	272	82
28	12	David Stremme	Penske Racing	Dodge	272	79
29	39	Ryan Newman	Stewart–Haas Racing	Chevrolet	270	81^{1}
30	98	Paul Menard	Yates Racing	Ford	267	73
31	31	Jeff Burton	Richard Childress Racing	Chevrolet	251	70
32	44	A. J. Allmendinger	Richard Petty Motorsports	Dodge	238	67
33	26	Jamie McMurray	Roush Fenway Racing	Ford	237	64
34	29	Kevin Harvick	Richard Childress Racing	Chevrolet	231	61
35	83	Brian Vickers	Red Bull Racing Team	Toyota	190	58
36	82	Scott Speed	Red Bull Racing Team	Toyota	189	55
37	1	Martin Truex Jr.	Earnhardt Ganassi Racing	Chevrolet	174	52
38	6	David Ragan	Roush Fenway Racing	Ford	174	49
39	87	Joe Nemechek	NEMCO Motorsports	Toyota	67	46
40	71	David Gilliland	TRG Motorsports	Chevrolet	48	43
41	37	Tony Raines	Front Row Motorsports	Dodge	30	40
42	66	Dave Blaney	Prism Motorsports	Toyota	29	37
43	36	Patrick Carpentier	Tommy Baldwin Racing	Toyota	14	34
^{1} Includes five bonus points for leading a lap
^{2} Includes ten bonus points for leading the most laps

== Standings after the race ==
Drivers' Championship standings

Pos	+/–	Driver	Points
1		Tony Stewart	2,524
2		Jeff Gordon	2,455 (−69)
3		Jimmie Johnson	2,355 (−169)
4		Kurt Busch	2,254 (−270)
5		Carl Edwards	2,157 (−367)
6	1	Denny Hamlin	2,132 (−392)
7	1	Ryan Newman	2,127 (−397)
8	1	Kyle Busch	2,108 (−416)
9	1	Greg Biffle	2,106 (−418)
10		Matt Kenseth	2,054 (−470)
11		Mark Martin	2,052 (−472)
12		Juan Pablo Montoya	2,049 (−475)

Manufacturers' Championship standings

Pos	+/–	Manufacturer	Points
1		Chevrolet	126
2		Toyota	94 (−32)
3		Ford	80 (−46)
4		Dodge	74 (−52)

- Note: Only the top twelve positions are included for the driver standings.

Previous race: 2009 Toyota/Save Mart 350	Sprint Cup Series; 2009 season	Next race: 2009 Coke Zero 400
