= 1995 DieHard 500 =

18th race of the 1995 NASCAR Winston Cup Series

Race details
- Race 18 of 31 in the 1995 NASCAR Winston Cup Series
- The 1995 DieHard 500 program cover.
- Date: July 23, 1995
- Official name: 27th Annual DieHard 500
- Location: Lincoln, Alabama, Talladega Superspeedway
- Course: Permanent racing facility
- Course length: 2.66 miles (4.28 km)
- Distance: 188 laps, 500.08 mi (804.8 km)
- Scheduled distance: 188 laps, 500.08 mi (804.8 km)
- Average speed: 173.188 miles per hour (278.719 km/h)

Pole position
Driver	Sterling Marlin	Morgan-McClure Motorsports
- Time: 49.307

Most laps led
Driver	Jeff Gordon	Hendrick Motorsports
- Laps: 97

Winner
No. 4	Sterling Marlin	Morgan-McClure Motorsports

Television in the United States
- Network: CBS
- Announcers: Ken Squier, Ned Jarrett, Richard Petty

Radio in the United States
- Radio: Motor Racing Network

The 1995 DieHard 500 was the 18th stock car race of the 1995 NASCAR Winston Cup Series and the 27th iteration of the event. The race was held on Sunday, July 23, 1995, in Lincoln, Alabama, at Talladega Superspeedway, a 2.66-mile (4.28 km) permanent triangle-shaped superspeedway. The race took the scheduled 188 laps to complete. At race's end, Morgan–McClure Motorsports driver Sterling Marlin would manage to dominate the late stages of the race to take his fourth career NASCAR Winston Cup Series victory and his third and final victory of the season. To fill out the top three, Robert Yates Racing driver Dale Jarrett and Richard Childress Racing driver Dale Earnhardt would finish second and third, respectively.

On lap 139 of the race, a 13-car pileup started when Hendrick Motorsports driver Jeff Gordon tapped the left rear of teammate Ken Schrader, sending Schrader airborne. Schrader proceeded to flip numerous times end over end. In the carnage, 12 other cars suffered damage. Schrader suffered a bruised right eye in the wreck.

== Background ==
The layout of Talladega Superspeedway, the venue where the race was held.

Talladega Superspeedway, originally known as Alabama International Motor Superspeedway (AIMS), is a motorsports complex located north of Talladega, Alabama. It is located on the former Anniston Air Force Base in the small city of Lincoln. The track is a tri-oval and was constructed in the 1960s by the International Speedway Corporation, a business controlled by the France family. Talladega is most known for its steep banking and the unique location of the start/finish line that's located just past the exit to pit road. The track currently hosts the NASCAR series such as the NASCAR Cup Series, Xfinity Series and the Camping World Truck Series. Talladega is the longest NASCAR oval, a 2.66-mile-long (4.28 km) tri-oval like the Daytona International Speedway, which also is a 2.5-mile-long (4.0 km) tri-oval.

=== Entry list ===
- (R) denotes rookie driver.

#	Driver	Team	Make
0	Delma Cowart	H. L. Waters Racing	Ford
1	Rick Mast	Precision Products Racing	Pontiac
2	Rusty Wallace	Penske Racing South	Ford
3	Dale Earnhardt	Richard Childress Racing	Chevrolet
4	Sterling Marlin	Morgan–McClure Motorsports	Chevrolet
5	Terry Labonte	Hendrick Motorsports	Chevrolet
6	Mark Martin	Roush Racing	Ford
7	Geoff Bodine	Geoff Bodine Racing	Ford
8	Jeff Burton	Stavola Brothers Racing	Ford
9	Lake Speed	Melling Racing	Ford
10	Ricky Rudd	Rudd Performance Motorsports	Ford
11	Brett Bodine	Junior Johnson & Associates	Ford
12	Derrike Cope	Bobby Allison Motorsports	Ford
15	Dick Trickle	Bud Moore Engineering	Ford
16	Ted Musgrave	Roush Racing	Ford
17	Darrell Waltrip	Darrell Waltrip Motorsports	Chevrolet
18	Bobby Labonte	Joe Gibbs Racing	Chevrolet
19	Loy Allen Jr.	TriStar Motorsports	Ford
21	Morgan Shepherd	Wood Brothers Racing	Ford
22	Jimmy Hensley	Bill Davis Racing	Pontiac
23	Jimmy Spencer	Haas-Carter Motorsports	Ford
24	Jeff Gordon	Hendrick Motorsports	Chevrolet
25	Ken Schrader	Hendrick Motorsports	Chevrolet
26	Hut Stricklin	King Racing	Ford
27	Elton Sawyer	Junior Johnson & Associates	Ford
28	Dale Jarrett	Robert Yates Racing	Ford
29	Steve Grissom	Diamond Ridge Motorsports	Chevrolet
30	Michael Waltrip	Bahari Racing	Pontiac
31	Ward Burton	A.G. Dillard Motorsports	Chevrolet
32	Chuck Bown	Active Motorsports	Chevrolet
33	Robert Pressley (R)	Leo Jackson Motorsports	Chevrolet
37	John Andretti	Kranefuss-Haas Racing	Ford
40	Randy LaJoie	Dick Brooks Racing	Pontiac
41	Ricky Craven (R)	Larry Hedrick Motorsports	Chevrolet
42	Kyle Petty	Team SABCO	Pontiac
43	Bobby Hamilton	Petty Enterprises	Pontiac
44	Jeff Purvis	Phoenix Racing	Ford
65	Steve Seligman	O'Neil Racing	Chevrolet
71	Dave Marcis	Marcis Auto Racing	Chevrolet
75	Todd Bodine	Butch Mock Motorsports	Ford
77	Bobby Hillin Jr.	Jasper Motorsports	Ford
87	Joe Nemechek	NEMCO Motorsports	Chevrolet
90	Mike Wallace	Donlavey Racing	Ford
94	Bill Elliott	Elliott-Hardy Racing	Ford
97	Chad Little	Mark Rypien Motorsports	Ford
98	Jeremy Mayfield	Cale Yarborough Motorsports	Ford

== Qualifying ==
Qualifying was split into two rounds. The first round was held on Friday, July 21, at 4:00 PM EST. Each driver would have one lap to set a time. During the first round, the top 20 drivers in the round would be guaranteed a starting spot in the race. If a driver was not able to guarantee a spot in the first round, they had the option to scrub their time from the first round and try and run a faster lap time in a second round qualifying run, held on Saturday, July 22, at 11:45 AM EST. As with the first round, each driver would have one lap to set a time. For this specific race, positions 21-38 would be decided on time, and depending on who needed it, a select amount of positions were given to cars who had not otherwise qualified but were high enough in owner's points; which was usually four. If needed, a past champion who did not qualify on either time or provisionals could use a champion's provisional, adding one more spot to the field.

Sterling Marlin, driving for Morgan–McClure Motorsports, would win the pole, setting a time of 49.307 and an average speed of 194.212 miles per hour (312.554 km/h) in the first round.

Three drivers would fail to qualify.

=== Full qualifying results ===
Pos.	#	Driver	Team	Make	Time	Speed
1	4	Sterling Marlin	Morgan–McClure Motorsports	Chevrolet	49.307	194.212
2	18	Bobby Labonte	Joe Gibbs Racing	Chevrolet	49.412	193.799
3	24	Jeff Gordon	Hendrick Motorsports	Chevrolet	49.427	193.740
4	25	Ken Schrader	Hendrick Motorsports	Chevrolet	49.448	193.658
5	3	Dale Earnhardt	Richard Childress Racing	Chevrolet	49.450	193.650
6	10	Ricky Rudd	Rudd Performance Motorsports	Ford	49.482	193.525
7	30	Michael Waltrip	Bahari Racing	Pontiac	49.494	193.478
8	17	Darrell Waltrip	Darrell Waltrip Motorsports	Chevrolet	49.506	193.433
9	37	John Andretti	Kranefuss-Haas Racing	Ford	49.518	193.384
10	33	Robert Pressley (R)	Leo Jackson Motorsports	Chevrolet	49.564	193.205
11	6	Mark Martin	Roush Racing	Ford	49.570	193.181
12	44	Jeff Purvis	Phoenix Racing	Chevrolet	49.570	193.181
13	28	Dale Jarrett	Robert Yates Racing	Ford	49.582	193.135
14	75	Todd Bodine	Butch Mock Motorsports	Ford	49.602	193.057
15	19	Loy Allen Jr.	TriStar Motorsports	Ford	49.630	192.948
16	1	Rick Mast	Precision Products Racing	Ford	49.665	192.812
17	15	Dick Trickle	Bud Moore Engineering	Ford	49.681	192.750
18	40	Randy LaJoie	Dick Brooks Racing	Pontiac	49.705	192.657
19	7	Geoff Bodine	Geoff Bodine Racing	Ford	49.746	192.498
20	9	Lake Speed	Melling Racing	Ford	49.782	192.359
Failed to lock in Round 1
21	98	Jeremy Mayfield	Cale Yarborough Motorsports	Ford	49.834	192.158
22	97	Chad Little	Mark Rypien Motorsports	Ford	49.845	192.116
23	23	Jimmy Spencer	Travis Carter Enterprises	Ford	49.850	192.096
24	21	Morgan Shepherd	Wood Brothers Racing	Ford	49.860	192.058
25	71	Dave Marcis	Marcis Auto Racing	Chevrolet	49.870	192.019
26	2	Rusty Wallace	Penske Racing South	Ford	49.894	191.927
27	26	Hut Stricklin	King Racing	Ford	49.907	191.877
28	27	Elton Sawyer	Junior Johnson & Associates	Ford	49.976	191.612
29	41	Ricky Craven (R)	Larry Hedrick Motorsports	Chevrolet	50.006	191.497
30	77	Bobby Hillin Jr.	Jasper Motorsports	Ford	50.081	191.210
31	29	Steve Grissom	Diamond Ridge Motorsports	Chevrolet	50.094	191.161
32	87	Joe Nemechek	NEMCO Motorsports	Chevrolet	50.116	191.077
33	16	Ted Musgrave	Roush Racing	Ford	50.135	191.004
34	11	Brett Bodine	Junior Johnson & Associates	Ford	50.141	190.981
35	90	Mike Wallace	Donlavey Racing	Ford	50.170	190.871
36	32	Chuck Bown	Active Motorsports	Chevrolet	50.183	190.822
37	8	Jeff Burton	Stavola Brothers Racing	Ford	50.185	190.814
38	5	Terry Labonte	Hendrick Motorsports	Chevrolet	50.191	190.791
Provisionals
39	43	Bobby Hamilton	Petty Enterprises	Pontiac	-*	-*
40	12	Derrike Cope	Bobby Allison Motorsports	Ford	-*	-*
41	42	Kyle Petty	Team SABCO	Pontiac	-*	-*
42	31	Ward Burton	A.G. Dillard Motorsports	Chevrolet	-*	-*
Champion's Provisional
43	94	Bill Elliott	Elliott-Hardy Racing	Ford	-*	-*
Failed to qualify
44	22	Jimmy Hensley	Bill Davis Racing	Pontiac	-*	-*
45	0	Delma Cowart	H. L. Waters Racing	Ford	-*	-*
46	65	Steve Seligman	O'Neil Racing	Chevrolet	-*	-*
Official first round qualifying results
Official starting lineup

== Race results ==
Fin	St	#	Driver	Team	Make	Laps	Led	Status	Pts	Winnings
1	1	4	Sterling Marlin	Morgan–McClure Motorsports	Chevrolet	188	57	running	180	$219,425
2	13	28	Dale Jarrett	Robert Yates Racing	Ford	188	0	running	170	$65,895
3	5	3	Dale Earnhardt	Richard Childress Racing	Chevrolet	188	20	running	170	$57,105
4	24	21	Morgan Shepherd	Wood Brothers Racing	Ford	188	1	running	165	$40,805
5	43	94	Bill Elliott	Elliott-Hardy Racing	Ford	188	4	running	160	$32,325
6	41	42	Kyle Petty	Team SABCO	Pontiac	188	0	running	150	$34,100
7	11	6	Mark Martin	Roush Racing	Ford	188	2	running	151	$31,875
8	3	24	Jeff Gordon	Hendrick Motorsports	Chevrolet	188	97	running	152	$42,375
9	7	30	Michael Waltrip	Bahari Racing	Pontiac	188	4	running	143	$24,695
10	23	23	Jimmy Spencer	Travis Carter Enterprises	Ford	187	0	running	134	$22,925
11	33	16	Ted Musgrave	Roush Racing	Ford	187	0	running	130	$23,755
12	35	90	Mike Wallace	Donlavey Racing	Ford	187	0	running	127	$18,375
13	21	98	Jeremy Mayfield	Cale Yarborough Motorsports	Ford	187	0	running	124	$18,055
14	28	27	Elton Sawyer	Junior Johnson & Associates	Ford	187	0	running	121	$21,885
15	40	12	Derrike Cope	Bobby Allison Motorsports	Ford	187	0	running	118	$18,610
16	30	77	Bobby Hillin Jr.	Jasper Motorsports	Ford	187	0	running	115	$13,575
17	16	1	Rick Mast	Precision Products Racing	Ford	187	0	running	112	$22,110
18	22	97	Chad Little	Mark Rypien Motorsports	Ford	186	0	running	109	$14,105
19	25	71	Dave Marcis	Marcis Auto Racing	Chevrolet	186	0	running	106	$16,725
20	42	31	Ward Burton	A.G. Dillard Motorsports	Chevrolet	186	0	running	103	$18,135
21	39	43	Bobby Hamilton	Petty Enterprises	Pontiac	186	0	running	100	$16,105
22	37	8	Jeff Burton	Stavola Brothers Racing	Ford	186	0	running	97	$20,875
23	32	87	Joe Nemechek	NEMCO Motorsports	Chevrolet	186	0	running	94	$12,470
24	19	7	Geoff Bodine	Geoff Bodine Racing	Ford	185	0	running	91	$26,815
25	31	29	Steve Grissom	Diamond Ridge Motorsports	Chevrolet	185	0	running	88	$15,585
26	29	41	Ricky Craven (R)	Larry Hedrick Motorsports	Chevrolet	185	0	running	85	$16,060
27	10	33	Robert Pressley (R)	Leo Jackson Motorsports	Chevrolet	183	0	running	82	$20,390
28	34	11	Brett Bodine	Junior Johnson & Associates	Ford	181	0	running	79	$24,820
29	14	75	Todd Bodine	Butch Mock Motorsports	Ford	162	0	crash	76	$19,750
30	26	2	Rusty Wallace	Penske Racing South	Ford	158	0	crash	73	$26,880
31	2	18	Bobby Labonte	Joe Gibbs Racing	Chevrolet	144	2	crash	75	$25,090
32	4	25	Ken Schrader	Hendrick Motorsports	Chevrolet	138	0	crash	67	$20,120
33	38	5	Terry Labonte	Hendrick Motorsports	Chevrolet	138	0	crash	64	$26,240
34	9	37	John Andretti	Kranefuss-Haas Racing	Ford	138	0	crash	61	$11,395
35	20	9	Lake Speed	Melling Racing	Ford	138	0	crash	58	$11,365
36	27	26	Hut Stricklin	King Racing	Ford	126	1	engine	60	$16,320
37	36	32	Chuck Bown	Active Motorsports	Chevrolet	107	0	crash	52	$11,306
38	17	15	Dick Trickle	Bud Moore Engineering	Ford	103	0	engine	49	$16,175
39	15	19	Loy Allen Jr.	TriStar Motorsports	Ford	97	0	engine	46	$11,175
40	18	40	Randy LaJoie	Dick Brooks Racing	Pontiac	96	0	transmission	43	$16,175
41	6	10	Ricky Rudd	Rudd Performance Motorsports	Ford	68	0	piston	40	$24,175
42	12	44	Jeff Purvis	Phoenix Racing	Chevrolet	50	0	engine	37	$11,175
43	8	17	Darrell Waltrip	Darrell Waltrip Motorsports	Chevrolet	45	0	engine	34	$16,675
Official race results

== Media ==
=== Television ===
The Diehard 500 was covered by CBS in the United States. Ken Squier, two-time NASCAR Cup Series champion Ned Jarrett and 1974 race winner Richard Petty called the race from the broadcast booth. Mike Joy, David Hobbs and Dick Berggren handled pit road for the television side. This would be the last race Richard Petty would call for CBS as he would be replaced by Buddy Baker from 1996.

CBS
Booth announcers		Pit reporters
Lap-by-lap	Color-commentators	Pit reporters
Ken Squier	Ned Jarrett; Richard Petty	Mike Joy; David Hobbs; Dick Berggren

Previous race: 1995 Miller Genuine Draft 500 (Pocono)	NASCAR Winston Cup Series; 1995 season	Next race: 1995 Brickyard 400
