= 1995 Miller Genuine Draft 500 (Pocono) =

17th race of the 1995 NASCAR Winston Cup Series

Race details
- Race 17 of 31 in the 1995 NASCAR Winston Cup Series
- The 1995 Miller Genuine Draft 500 program cover, featuring Rusty Wallace. Artwork by NASCAR artist Sam Bass.
- Date: July 16, 1995
- Official name: 23rd Annual Miller Genuine Draft 500
- Location: Long Pond, Pennsylvania, Pocono Raceway
- Course: Permanent racing facility
- Course length: 2.5 miles (4.0 km)
- Distance: 200 laps, 500 mi (804.672 km)
- Scheduled distance: 200 laps, 500 mi (804.672 km)
- Average speed: 134.038 miles per hour (215.713 km/h)

Pole position
Driver	Bill Elliott	Elliott-Hardy Racing
- Time: 55.386

Most laps led
Driver	Rusty Wallace	Penske Racing South
- Laps: 74

Winner
No. 28	Dale Jarrett	Robert Yates Racing

Television in the United States
- Network: TBS
- Announcers: Ken Squier, Buddy Baker, Chad Little

Radio in the United States
- Radio: Motor Racing Network

The 1995 Miller Genuine Draft 500 was the 17th stock car race of the 1995 NASCAR Winston Cup Series and the 23rd iteration of the event. The race was held on Sunday, July 16, 1995, in Long Pond, Pennsylvania, at Pocono Raceway, a 2.5 miles (4.0 km) triangular permanent course. The race took the scheduled 200 laps to complete. Depending on fuel mileage, Robert Yates Racing driver Dale Jarrett would manage to stretch his last fuel run for 41 laps to take his fourth career NASCAR Winston Cup Series victory and his only victory of the season. To fill out the top three, Hendrick Motorsports driver Jeff Gordon and Rudd Performance Motorsports driver Ricky Rudd would finish second and third, respectively.

== Background ==
The layout of Pocono Raceway, the venue where the race was held.

The race was held at Pocono Raceway, which is a three-turn superspeedway located in Long Pond, Pennsylvania. The track hosts two annual NASCAR Sprint Cup Series races, as well as one Xfinity Series and Camping World Truck Series event. Until 2019, the track also hosted an IndyCar Series race.

Pocono Raceway is one of a very few NASCAR tracks not owned by either Speedway Motorsports, Inc. or International Speedway Corporation. It is operated by the Igdalsky siblings Brandon, Nicholas, and sister Ashley, and cousins Joseph IV and Chase Mattioli, all of whom are third-generation members of the family-owned Mattco Inc, started by Joseph II and Rose Mattioli.

Outside of the NASCAR races, the track is used throughout the year by Sports Car Club of America (SCCA) and motorcycle clubs as well as racing schools and an IndyCar race. The triangular oval also has three separate infield sections of racetrack – North Course, East Course and South Course. Each of these infield sections use a separate portion of the tri-oval to complete the track. During regular non-race weekends, multiple clubs can use the track by running on different infield sections. Also some of the infield sections can be run in either direction, or multiple infield sections can be put together – such as running the North Course and the South Course and using the tri-oval to connect the two.

=== Entry list ===
- (R) denotes rookie driver.

#	Driver	Team	Make
1	Rick Mast	Precision Products Racing	Pontiac
2	Rusty Wallace	Penske Racing South	Ford
3	Dale Earnhardt	Richard Childress Racing	Chevrolet
4	Sterling Marlin	Morgan–McClure Motorsports	Chevrolet
5	Terry Labonte	Hendrick Motorsports	Chevrolet
6	Mark Martin	Roush Racing	Ford
7	Geoff Bodine	Geoff Bodine Racing	Ford
8	Jeff Burton	Stavola Brothers Racing	Ford
9	Lake Speed	Melling Racing	Ford
10	Ricky Rudd	Rudd Performance Motorsports	Ford
11	Brett Bodine	Junior Johnson & Associates	Ford
12	Derrike Cope	Bobby Allison Motorsports	Ford
14	Randy MacDonald	Hagan Racing	Pontiac
15	Dick Trickle	Bud Moore Engineering	Ford
16	Ted Musgrave	Roush Racing	Ford
17	Darrell Waltrip	Darrell Waltrip Motorsports	Chevrolet
18	Bobby Labonte	Joe Gibbs Racing	Chevrolet
21	Morgan Shepherd	Wood Brothers Racing	Ford
22	Jimmy Hensley	Bill Davis Racing	Pontiac
23	Jimmy Spencer	Haas-Carter Motorsports	Ford
24	Jeff Gordon	Hendrick Motorsports	Chevrolet
25	Ken Schrader	Hendrick Motorsports	Chevrolet
26	Hut Stricklin	King Racing	Ford
27	Elton Sawyer	Junior Johnson & Associates	Ford
28	Dale Jarrett	Robert Yates Racing	Ford
29	Steve Grissom	Diamond Ridge Motorsports	Chevrolet
30	Michael Waltrip	Bahari Racing	Pontiac
31	Ward Burton	A.G. Dillard Motorsports	Chevrolet
33	Robert Pressley (R)	Leo Jackson Motorsports	Chevrolet
37	John Andretti	Kranefuss-Haas Racing	Ford
40	Rich Bickle	Dick Brooks Racing	Pontiac
41	Ricky Craven (R)	Larry Hedrick Motorsports	Chevrolet
42	Kyle Petty	Team SABCO	Pontiac
43	Bobby Hamilton	Petty Enterprises	Pontiac
71	Dave Marcis	Marcis Auto Racing	Chevrolet
75	Todd Bodine	Butch Mock Motorsports	Ford
77	Bobby Hillin Jr.	Jasper Motorsports	Ford
81	Kenny Wallace	FILMAR Racing	Ford
82	Terry Byers	Byers Racing	Ford
87	Joe Nemechek	NEMCO Motorsports	Chevrolet
90	Mike Wallace	Donlavey Racing	Ford
94	Bill Elliott	Elliott-Hardy Racing	Ford
98	Jeremy Mayfield	Cale Yarborough Motorsports	Ford

== Qualifying ==
Qualifying was split into two rounds. The first round was held on Friday, July 7, at 4:00 PM EST. Each driver would have one lap to set a time. During the first round, the top 20 drivers in the round would be guaranteed a starting spot in the race. If a driver was not able to guarantee a spot in the first round, they had the option to scrub their time from the first round and try and run a faster lap time in a second round qualifying run, held on Saturday, July 8, at 11:00 AM EST. As with the first round, each driver would have one lap to set a time. For this specific race, positions 21-38 would be decided on time, and depending on who needed it, a select amount of positions were given to cars who had not otherwise qualified but were high enough in owner's points.

Bill Elliott, driving for Elliott-Hardy Racing, would win the pole, setting a time of 55.386 and an average speed of 162.496 miles per hour (261.512 km/h).

Two drivers would fail to qualify.

=== Full qualifying results ===
Pos.	#	Driver	Team	Make	Time	Speed
1	94	Bill Elliott	Elliott-Hardy Racing	Ford	55.386	162.496
2	6	Mark Martin	Roush Racing	Ford	55.558	161.993
3	21	Morgan Shepherd	Wood Brothers Racing	Ford	55.749	161.438
4	25	Ken Schrader	Hendrick Motorsports	Chevrolet	55.795	161.305
5	3	Dale Earnhardt	Richard Childress Racing	Chevrolet	55.806	161.273
6	4	Sterling Marlin	Morgan–McClure Motorsports	Chevrolet	55.824	161.221
7	16	Ted Musgrave	Roush Racing	Ford	55.825	161.218
8	43	Bobby Hamilton	Petty Enterprises	Pontiac	55.877	161.068
9	87	Joe Nemechek	NEMCO Motorsports	Chevrolet	55.884	161.048
10	1	Rick Mast	Precision Products Racing	Ford	55.894	161.019
11	24	Jeff Gordon	Hendrick Motorsports	Chevrolet	55.917	160.953
12	17	Darrell Waltrip	Darrell Waltrip Motorsports	Chevrolet	55.946	160.869
13	10	Ricky Rudd	Rudd Performance Motorsports	Ford	55.981	160.769
14	31	Ward Burton	A.G. Dillard Motorsports	Chevrolet	55.983	160.763
15	28	Dale Jarrett	Robert Yates Racing	Ford	56.041	160.597
16	11	Brett Bodine	Junior Johnson & Associates	Ford	56.105	160.414
17	42	Kyle Petty	Team SABCO	Pontiac	56.174	160.216
18	26	Hut Stricklin	King Racing	Ford	56.196	160.154
19	12	Derrike Cope	Bobby Allison Motorsports	Ford	56.208	160.120
20	22	Jimmy Hensley	Bill Davis Racing	Pontiac	56.219	160.088
21	30	Michael Waltrip	Bahari Racing	Pontiac	56.248	160.006
22	2	Rusty Wallace	Penske Racing South	Ford	56.281	159.912
23	8	Jeff Burton	Stavola Brothers Racing	Ford	56.296	159.869
24	5	Terry Labonte	Hendrick Motorsports	Chevrolet	56.305	159.844
25	15	Dick Trickle	Bud Moore Engineering	Ford	56.317	159.810
26	29	Steve Grissom	Diamond Ridge Motorsports	Chevrolet	56.325	159.787
27	7	Geoff Bodine	Geoff Bodine Racing	Ford	56.449	159.436
28	33	Robert Pressley (R)	Leo Jackson Motorsports	Chevrolet	56.466	159.388
29	9	Lake Speed	Melling Racing	Ford	56.475	159.363
30	40	Rich Bickle	Dick Brooks Racing	Pontiac	56.481	159.346
31	23	Jimmy Spencer	Travis Carter Enterprises	Ford	56.573	159.086
32	18	Bobby Labonte	Joe Gibbs Racing	Chevrolet	56.631	158.924
33	77	Bobby Hillin Jr.	Jasper Motorsports	Ford	56.639	158.901
34	81	Kenny Wallace	FILMAR Racing	Ford	56.741	158.615
35	90	Mike Wallace	Donlavey Racing	Ford	56.834	158.356
36	37	John Andretti	Kranefuss-Haas Racing	Ford	56.976	157.961
37	71	Dave Marcis	Marcis Auto Racing	Chevrolet	56.992	157.917
38	98	Jeremy Mayfield	Cale Yarborough Motorsports	Ford	57.062	157.723
Provisionals
39	41	Ricky Craven (R)	Larry Hedrick Motorsports	Chevrolet	-*	-*
40	75	Todd Bodine	Butch Mock Motorsports	Ford	-*	-*
41	27	Elton Sawyer	Junior Johnson & Associates	Ford	-*	-*
Failed to qualify
42	14	Randy MacDonald	Hagan Racing	Pontiac	-*	-*
43	82	Terry Byers	Byers Racing	Ford	-*	-*
Official first round qualifying results
Official starting lineup

== Race results ==
Fin	St	#	Driver	Team	Make	Laps	Led	Status	Pts	Winnings
1	15	28	Dale Jarrett	Robert Yates Racing	Ford	200	26	running	180	$72,970
2	11	24	Jeff Gordon	Hendrick Motorsports	Chevrolet	200	18	running	175	$48,520
3	13	10	Ricky Rudd	Rudd Performance Motorsports	Ford	200	0	running	165	$41,010
4	7	16	Ted Musgrave	Roush Racing	Ford	200	1	running	165	$32,135
5	1	94	Bill Elliott	Elliott-Hardy Racing	Ford	200	15	running	160	$32,780
6	27	7	Geoff Bodine	Geoff Bodine Racing	Ford	200	1	running	155	$29,180
7	2	6	Mark Martin	Roush Racing	Ford	200	41	running	151	$38,760
8	38	98	Jeremy Mayfield	Cale Yarborough Motorsports	Ford	200	0	running	142	$19,080
9	9	87	Joe Nemechek	NEMCO Motorsports	Chevrolet	200	0	running	138	$12,080
10	25	15	Dick Trickle	Bud Moore Engineering	Ford	200	0	running	134	$23,780
11	14	31	Ward Burton	A.G. Dillard Motorsports	Chevrolet	200	0	running	130	$15,530
12	33	77	Bobby Hillin Jr.	Jasper Motorsports	Ford	200	0	running	127	$10,980
13	10	1	Rick Mast	Precision Products Racing	Ford	200	0	running	124	$19,980
14	24	5	Terry Labonte	Hendrick Motorsports	Chevrolet	200	0	running	121	$25,380
15	16	11	Brett Bodine	Junior Johnson & Associates	Ford	200	0	running	118	$24,480
16	22	2	Rusty Wallace	Penske Racing South	Ford	200	74	running	125	$30,480
17	31	23	Jimmy Spencer	Travis Carter Enterprises	Ford	200	2	running	117	$19,280
18	6	4	Sterling Marlin	Morgan–McClure Motorsports	Chevrolet	200	0	running	109	$23,080
19	8	43	Bobby Hamilton	Petty Enterprises	Pontiac	199	0	running	106	$13,930
20	5	3	Dale Earnhardt	Richard Childress Racing	Chevrolet	199	0	running	103	$31,555
21	21	30	Michael Waltrip	Bahari Racing	Pontiac	199	0	running	100	$18,380
22	29	9	Lake Speed	Melling Racing	Ford	199	0	running	97	$13,180
23	40	75	Todd Bodine	Butch Mock Motorsports	Ford	199	0	running	94	$17,980
24	3	21	Morgan Shepherd	Wood Brothers Racing	Ford	199	0	running	91	$17,830
25	39	41	Ricky Craven (R)	Larry Hedrick Motorsports	Chevrolet	199	2	running	93	$13,880
26	35	90	Mike Wallace	Donlavey Racing	Ford	198	0	running	85	$12,530
27	23	8	Jeff Burton	Stavola Brothers Racing	Ford	198	2	running	87	$17,355
28	17	42	Kyle Petty	Team SABCO	Pontiac	198	0	running	79	$17,205
29	41	27	Elton Sawyer	Junior Johnson & Associates	Ford	196	0	running	76	$17,055
30	30	40	Rich Bickle	Dick Brooks Racing	Pontiac	196	0	running	73	$14,005
31	26	29	Steve Grissom	Diamond Ridge Motorsports	Chevrolet	196	0	running	70	$11,955
32	20	22	Jimmy Hensley	Bill Davis Racing	Pontiac	194	0	running	67	$16,905
33	37	71	Dave Marcis	Marcis Auto Racing	Chevrolet	186	2	engine	69	$11,305
34	28	33	Robert Pressley (R)	Leo Jackson Motorsports	Chevrolet	166	0	running	61	$14,230
35	32	18	Bobby Labonte	Joe Gibbs Racing	Chevrolet	162	1	running	63	$21,655
36	12	17	Darrell Waltrip	Darrell Waltrip Motorsports	Chevrolet	156	0	engine	55	$13,580
37	34	81	Kenny Wallace	FILMAR Racing	Ford	149	0	crash	52	$8,515
38	36	37	John Andretti	Kranefuss-Haas Racing	Ford	136	0	engine	49	$8,390
39	19	12	Derrike Cope	Bobby Allison Motorsports	Ford	108	0	engine	46	$8,390
40	4	25	Ken Schrader	Hendrick Motorsports	Chevrolet	93	15	engine	48	$14,390
41	18	26	Hut Stricklin	King Racing	Ford	38	0	engine	40	$13,390
Official race results

Previous race: 1995 Slick 50 300	NASCAR Winston Cup Series; 1995 season	Next race: 1995 DieHard 500
