= Ramsey R. Poston =

American public relations expert known for crisis management

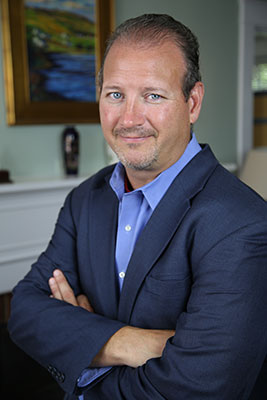
- Ramsey Poston in 2016
- Born: 1966 (age 59–60); Washington, D.C., United States
- Occupation: Public relations expert
- Known for: NASCAR’s Managing Director of Communications from 2004 to 2011

Ramsey Raymond Poston (born 1966 in Washington, D.C.) is an American public relations expert who is the president of Tuckahoe Strategies, a strategic communications firm known for crisis management. Poston served as NASCAR’s Managing Director of Communications and spokesperson from 2004 to 2011.

Poston is a PR and crisis communications expert who is sought after by journalists for insights into communications challenges surrounding professional sports issues. In 2018 Poston published an ebook about crisis management, titled "The Crisis Communications Manual."

== Career ==
Poston joined NASCAR in 2001 to assist in managing the controversy around the death of Dale Earnhardt. Poston managed communications in a time of significant growth for the sport but was also faced with a number of high-profile controversies.

While at NASCAR, Poston oversaw communications regarding several major changes to the sport, including an updated championship points system, racecar changes, revised substance abuse policy, and fan outreach and diversity enhancement. Poston also oversaw NASCAR's push for greater media openness with the development of the NASCAR Citizen Journalist Corps.

Poston served as the primary communications strategist and spokesperson in several controversies and lawsuits related to NASCAR. Those challenges included a major antitrust lawsuit involving a racetrack in Kentucky Speedway v. NASCAR; a sponsorship lawsuit AT&T v. NASCAR; and a lawsuit challenging NASCAR substance abuse policy. Jeremy Mayfield v. NASCAR. In 2006, while NBC Sports was a league broadcast partner, NBC’s Dateline sent Muslim-looking men to a race in southwest Virginia to see how the NASCAR fans would treat them. In 2009, Poston expressed NASCAR's criticism of ABC's coverage of the fall Talladega race, stating: "ABC missed a lot of good racing."

Poston retold some of the “behind the scenes” steps NASCAR took as part of its accident investigation concerning the death of NASCAR driver Dale Earnhardt in a book entitled, “Chicken Soup for the Soul.

== Later career ==
Poston later became president of Tuckahoe Strategies, a strategic communications firm specializing in public relations, crisis management, and litigation communications. The firm opened in 2011.

He also serves as senior counsel at Dominion Strategies and is Of Counsel at Levick Strategic Communications.
