= Germain Racing =

Former NASCAR team

- Owner: Bob Germain
- Base: Welcome, North Carolina
- Series: NASCAR Cup Series
- Manufacturer: Chevrolet
- Opened: 2004
- Closed: 2020

Career
- Debut: Cup Series: 2009 Shelby 427 (Las Vegas); Nationwide Series: 2007 Gateway 250 (Gateway); Camping World Truck Series: 2004 Infineon 200 (Charlotte); ARCA Re/Max Series: 2008 Daytona ARCA 200 (Daytona)
- Latest race: Cup Series: 2020 Season Finale 500 (Phoenix); Nationwide Series: 2011 DRIVE4COPD 300 (Daytona); Camping World Truck Series: 2011 Ford 200 (Homestead); ARCA Re/Max Series: 2008 ARCA Re/Max 250 (Talladega)
- Races competed: Total: 896; Cup Series: 424; Nationwide Series: 113; Camping World Truck Series: 357; ARCA Re/Max Series: 2
- Drivers' Championships: Total: 2 Cup Series: 0 Nationwide Series: 0 Camping World Truck Series: 2; 2006, 2010; ARCA Re/Max Series: 0
- Race victories: Total: 22; Cup Series: 0 Nationwide Series: 0 Camping World Truck Series: 22; ARCA Re/Max Series: 0
- Pole positions: Total: 11; Cup Series: 1 Nationwide Series: 0 Camping World Truck Series: 9 ARCA Re/Max Series: 1

Germain Racing was an American professional stock car racing team that last competed in the NASCAR Cup Series. It was owned by Bob Germain, whose family owns many car dealerships across the United States as Germain Motor Company. The team last fielded the No. 13 Chevrolet Camaro ZL1 1LE full-time for Ty Dillon. It previously fielded the No. 03, No. 9, No. 30, No. 62 and No. 77 Toyota Tundras in the Camping World Truck Series and the No. 7 and No. 15 Toyota Camry in the NASCAR Xfinity Series. Previously, the team had been affiliated with Arnold Motorsports, a former Cup Series team, until the 2005 season as Germain-Arnold Racing.

After fielding Toyotas for most of its history, the team fielded Ford Fusions in 2012 and 2013. Then in 2014, the team switched to Chevrolet, ending a two-year partnership with Ford, and formed a technical alliance with Richard Childress Racing.

Following the announcement that longtime sponsor GEICO would not renew their partnership after the 2020 season, Germain Racing sold their charter to Denny Hamlin and Michael Jordan on September 21, 2020. Jordan and Hamlin would use the charter for their team 23XI Racing starting in 2021.

== NASCAR Cup Series ==
=== Car No. 13 history ===
Max Papis (2008-2010)

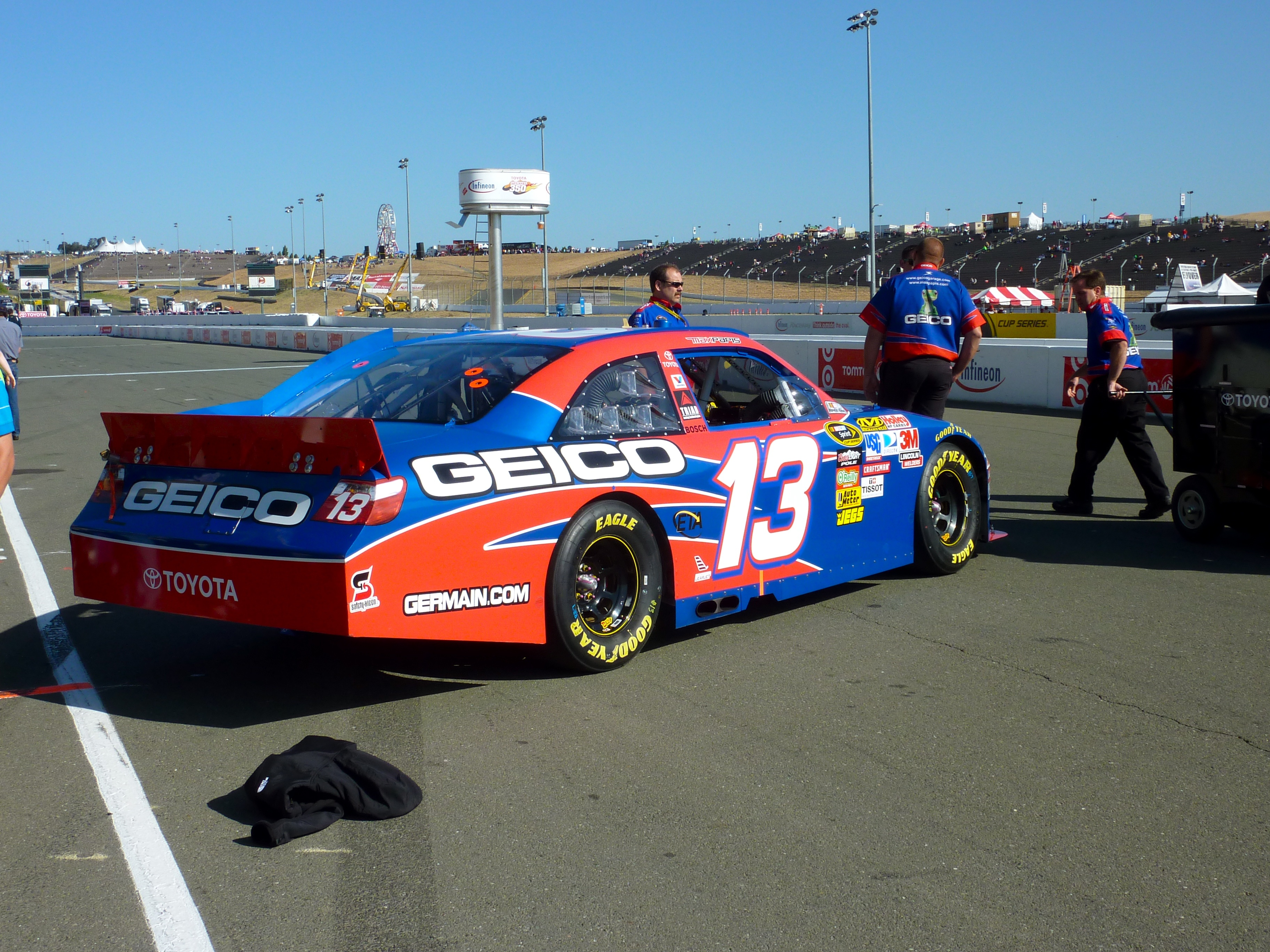
Max Papis' No. 13 car at the 2010 Toyota/Save Mart 350.

Germain entered into Sprint Cup racing through a technical alliance with Michael Waltrip Racing (MWR) beginning with two races during the 2008 season, with MWR supplying Toyota Camrys and technical support for Germain and driver Max Papis. Papis had previously driven for MWR vice president Cal Wells in the CART series.

In 2009, Germain Racing attempted to run a limited schedule in the Sprint Cup Series with Papis driving the No. 13 with sponsor GEICO. The team qualified for 15 races in 21 attempts. Germain planned to run full-time in 2010, but it was required to start and park some events due to its limited sponsorship from GEICO and lack of additional sponsorship. In the first event of the 2010 season, Papis qualified for the Daytona 500, where he was involved in an early wreck before finishing 40th due to engine woes. After Watkins Glen, the team announced that Papis would be replaced and reassigned to the Camping World Truck Series. Max Papis ran the following week Michigan in a start and park effort, the following week Casey Mears took over as the full-time driver at Bristol in another start and park effort. Papis ran 17 races in 2010, with 10 DNFs and 5 DNQs. Mears then finished out the 2010 season starting and parking in some events.

Casey Mears (2010-2016)

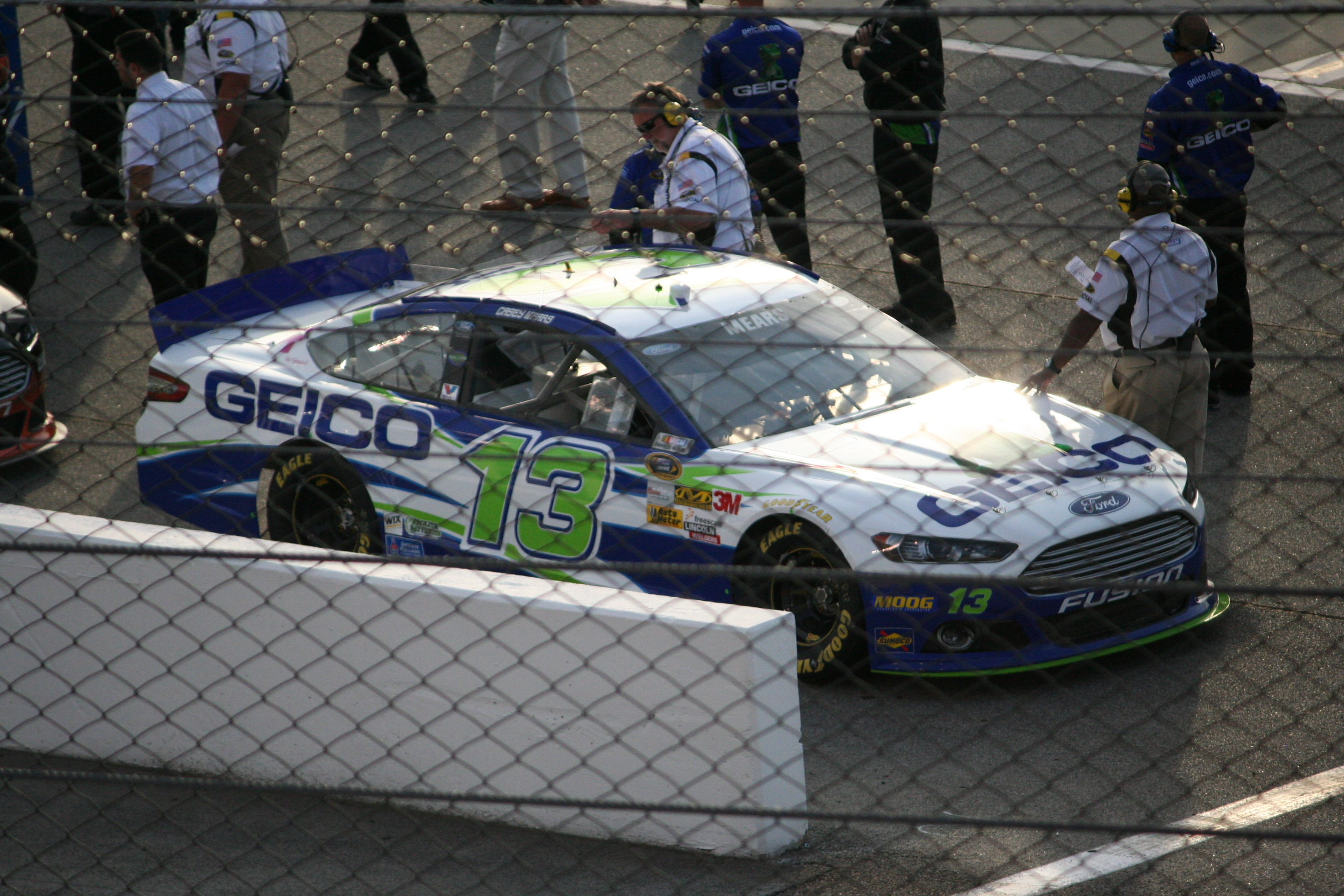
Casey Mears in the No. 13 at the 2013 Toyota Owners 400.

For 2011, Germain Racing announced that Mears would take over the ride full-time for the 2011 season. Mears and the team missed the Daytona 500, but no other events. The team finished 32nd in owners points.

On January 6, 2012, Germain Racing announced that Mears would return as the driver of the No. 13 GEICO Ford Fusion. GEICO is signed with the team through 2014. Mears led during the middle portions at Talladega, but crashed out. He finished 29th in points.

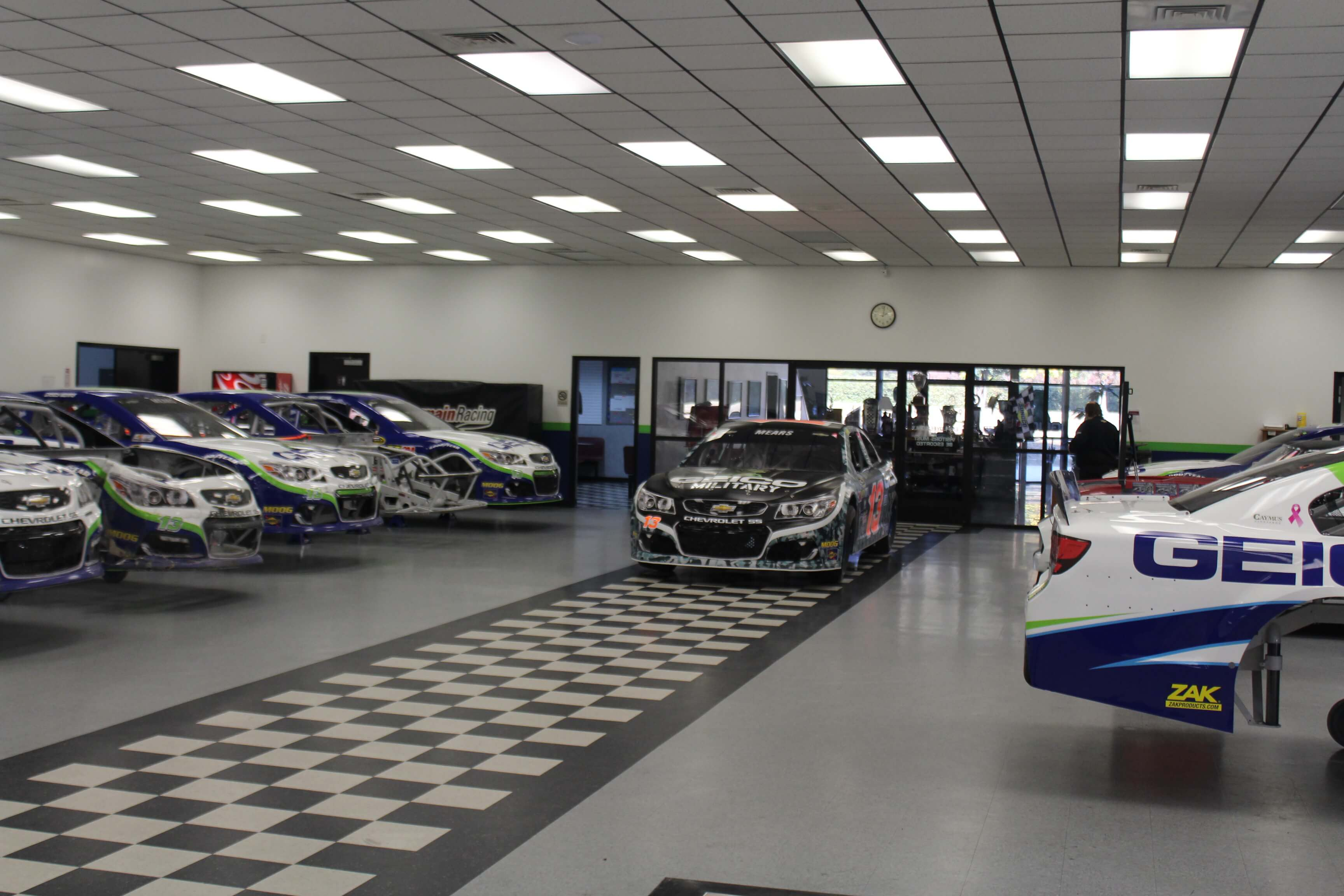
The Germain Race Shop, located in Mooresville, North Carolina in November 2016.

The team had a rebound year in 2013 with 1 Top 10 at Daytona and 7 Top 15s. Mears also improved to 24th in the standings, his best finish in the points since 2009. GEICO also plans to sponsor the team full season next year as well.

In 2014, Germain formed a partnership with Richard Childress Racing to field Chevrolets. Mears had previously driven for RCR in 2009. The team started the new season off with a top-10 when Mears finished 10th in the 2014 Daytona 500. Mears eventually recorded fourteen top-20s and three top-10s during the season, and finished 26th in driver points, although on a much more competitive landscape than the 24th place in 2013.

Mears began 2015 with a 6th-place finish in the Daytona 500. It was the team's 4th consecutive top-10 finish at Daytona. In 2016, it was announced that Ty Dillon would replace Mears in the No. 13 starting in 2017. Mears found a ride by driving part-time with Biagi-DenBeste Racing in the 98 GEICO Military car.

Ty Dillon (2017–2020)

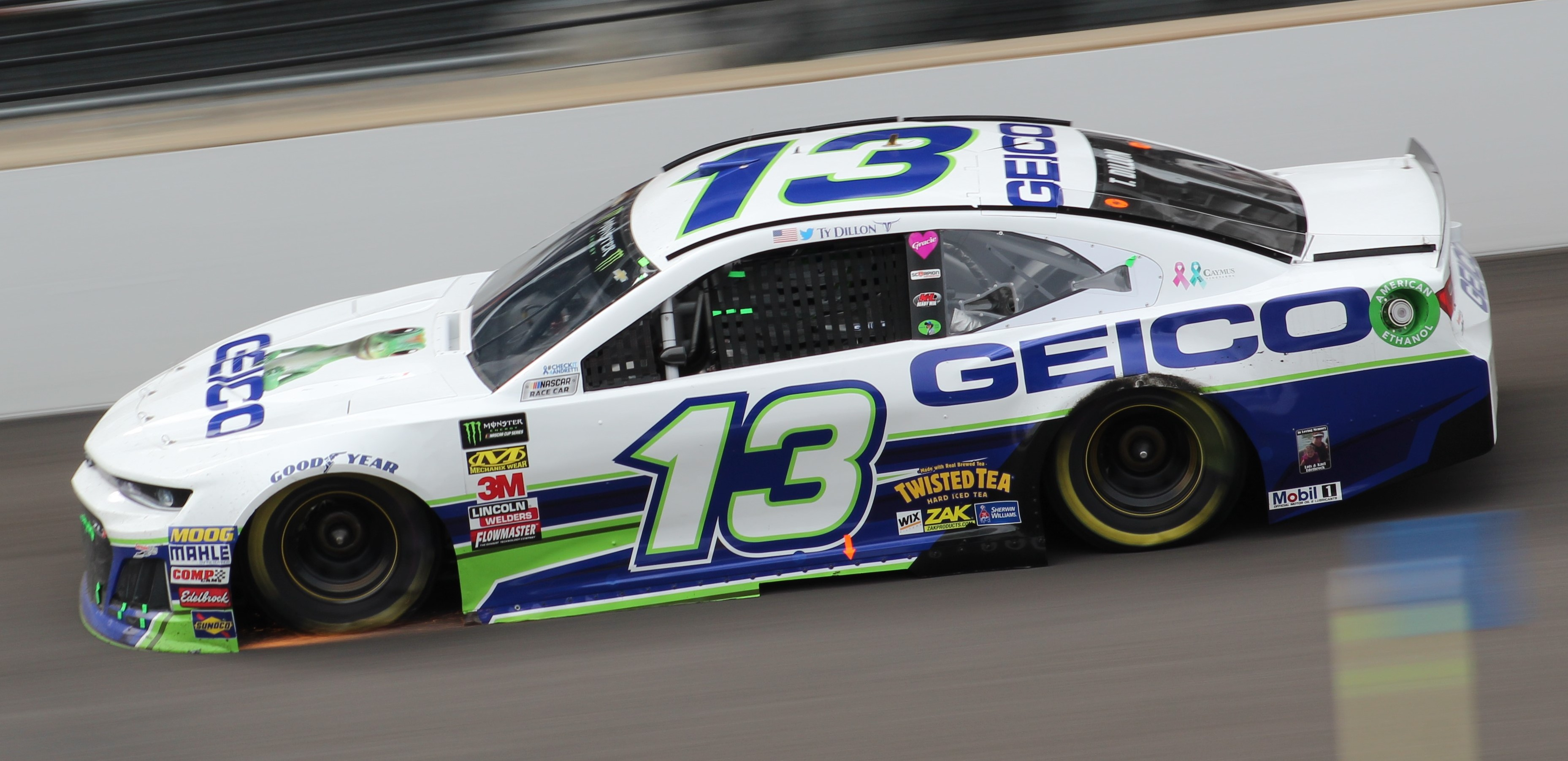
Ty Dillon in the No. 13 at the 2018 Brickyard 400.

On November 28, 2016, Ty Dillon was named the new driver for the No. 13 car for the 2017 season. In the 2017 offseason, Twisted Tea came on board for four races, the first time Germain had two sponsors on the same car in a year. After running solidly in 2017, Dillon's best runs included Dover, where he was fourth on a late restart, only to be taken out by his teammate by alliance Ryan Newman. He also led very late in the 2017 Coke Zero 400, where he got shuffled and finished 16th. Dillon's 2018 season was mediocre at most, with sixth place at the 2018 Coke Zero Sugar 400 being his highest finish.

Dillon started his 2019 season with a sixth-place finish at the 2019 Daytona 500. He also scored his first stage win at the spring Bristol race.

On August 26, 2019, crew chief Matt Borland was indefinitely suspended for violating NASCAR's Substance Abuse Policy. Germain Racing confirmed that Justin Alexander, who serves as crew chief for the part-time No. 21 Xfinity Series car for Richard Childress Racing (who Germain has an alliance with), served as interim crew chief beginning at Darlington and until Borland's suspension was lifted. On September 24, NASCAR reinstated Borland after he completed the Road to Recovery Program. In Germain Racing's final season, the No. 13 managed to score a third-place finish in the fall Talladega race and ended up 26th in the points standings.

==== Car No. 13 results ====
Year	Driver	No.	Make	1	2	3	4	5	6	7	8	9	10	11	12	13	14	15	16	17	18	19	20	21	22	23	24	25	26	27	28	29	30	31	32	33	34	35	36	Owners	Pts
2008	Max Papis	13	Toyota	DAY	CAL	LVS	ATL	BRI	MAR	TEX	PHO	TAL	RCH	DAR	CLT	DOV	POC	MCH	SON	NHA	DAY	CHI	IND	POC	GLN	MCH	BRI	CAL	RCH	NHA	DOV	KAN	TAL	CLT	MAR	ATL	TEX; DNQ	PHO	HOM; DNQ	57th	50
2009	Max Papis	13	Toyota	DAY	CAL	LVS; 36	ATL	BRI	MAR	TEX; 35	PHO	TAL; 18	RCH	DAR; 35	CLT; 42	DOV; DNQ	POC	MCH; 35	SON; 12	NHA	DAY; DNQ	CHI	IND; DNQ	POC	GLN; 8	MCH	BRI; DNQ	ATL; 40	RCH; 37	NHA	DOV	KAN; 32	CAL; 35	CLT; 41	MAR	TAL; 29	TEX; DNQ	PHO; 35	HOM; DNQ	43rd	1209
2010	Max Papis	13	Toyota	DAY; 40	CAL; 28	LVS; 33	ATL; 34	BRI; DNQ	MAR; 40	PHO; 40	TEX; 22	TAL; 40	RCH; DNQ	DAR; 29	DOV; DNQ	CLT; DNQ	POC; 34	MCH; 43	SON; 43	NHA; 43	DAY; 42	CHI; 42	IND; 43	POC; DNQ	GLN; 22	MCH; 41														38th	1994
2010	Casey Mears	13	Toyota																								BRI; 39	ATL; 26	RCH; 21	NHA; 38	DOV; 29	KAN; 24	CAL; 25	CLT; DNQ	MAR; 40	TAL; 24	TEX; 26	PHO; 24	HOM; 33	38th	1994
2011	Casey Mears	13	Toyota	DAY; DNQ	PHO; 18	LVS; 25	BRI; 37	CAL; 29	MAR; 36	TEX; 26	TAL; 22	RCH; 28	DAR; 30	DOV; 23	CLT; 23	KAN; 37	POC; 30	MCH; 38	SON; 34	DAY; 32	KEN; 25	NHA; 38	IND; 29	POC; 36	GLN; 20	MCH; 37	BRI; 23	ATL; 28	RCH; 17	CHI; 29	NHA; 42	DOV; 35	KAN; 42	CLT; 32	TAL; 17	MAR; 12	TEX; 25	PHO; 26	HOM; 26	32nd	541
2012	Casey Mears	13	Ford	DAY; 25	PHO; 39	LVS; 27	BRI; 25	CAL; 23	MAR; 25	TEX; 25	KAN; 26	RCH; 21	TAL; 18	DAR; 22	CLT; 22	DOV; 41	POC; 35	MCH; 20	SON; 15	KEN; 18	DAY; 18	NHA; 36	IND; 34	POC; 35	GLN; 16	MCH; 37	BRI; 21	ATL; 33	RCH; 29	CHI; 36	NHA; 36	DOV; 31	TAL; 26	CLT; 29	KAN; 37	MAR; 25	TEX; 21	PHO; 22	HOM; 29	30th	612
2013	Casey Mears	13	Ford	DAY; 29	PHO; 14	LVS; 29	BRI; 15	CAL; 15	MAR; 16	TEX; 31	KAN; 34	RCH; 30	TAL; 24	DAR; 37	CLT; 23	DOV; 16	POC; 22	MCH; 21	SON; 16	KEN; 18	DAY; 9	NHA; 36	IND; 27	POC; 24	GLN; 12	MCH; 25	BRI; 33	ATL; 22	RCH; 26	CHI; 30	NHA; 25	DOV; 24	KAN; 21	CLT; 31	TAL; 27	MAR; 21	TEX; 33	PHO; 27	HOM; 28	26th	719
2014	Casey Mears	13	Chevy	DAY; 10	PHO; 14	LVS; 28	BRI; 27	CAL; 15	MAR; 24	TEX; 28	DAR; 18	RCH; 19	TAL; 14	KAN; 26	CLT; 24	DOV; 25	POC; 23	MCH; 24	SON; 13	KEN; 20	DAY; 4	NHA; 38	IND; 33	POC; 12	GLN; 15	MCH; 17	BRI; 26	ATL; 22	RCH; 31	CHI; 26	NHA; 22	DOV; 27	KAN; 28	CLT; 31	TAL; 10	MAR; 37	TEX; 18	PHO; 35	HOM; 20	26th	782
2015	Casey Mears	13	Chevy	DAY; 6	ATL; 15	LVS; 25	PHO; 20	CAL; 23	MAR; 15	TEX; 27	BRI; 36	RCH; 30	TAL; 28	KAN; 19	CLT; 24	DOV; 27	POC; 16	MCH; 13	SON; 38	DAY; 11	KEN; 23	NHA; 16	IND; 20	POC; 28	GLN; 18	MCH; 42	BRI; 23	DAR; 29	RCH; 21	CHI; 20	NHA; 18	DOV; 24	CLT; 18	KAN; 23	TAL; 31	MAR; 17	TEX; 26	PHO; 22	HOM; 42	23rd	754
2016	Casey Mears	13	Chevy	DAY; 32	ATL; 14	LVS; 23	PHO; 35	CAL; 17	MAR; 31	TEX; 23	BRI; 24	RCH; 29	TAL; 33	KAN; 21	DOV; 26	CLT; 30	POC; 24	MCH; 32	SON; 24	DAY; 12	KEN; 30	NHA; 27	IND; 24	POC; 21	GLN; 12	BRI; 25	MCH; 22	DAR; 25	RCH; 21	CHI; 34	NHA; 27	DOV; 26	CLT; 40	KAN; 23	TAL; 39	MAR; 21	TEX; 39	PHO; 18	HOM; 18	29th	556
2017	Ty Dillon	13	Chevy	DAY; 30	ATL; 15	LVS; 21	PHO; 16	CAL; 18	MAR; 22	TEX; 17	BRI; 15	RCH; 26	TAL; 13	KAN; 14	CLT; 36	DOV; 14	POC; 18	MCH; 20	SON; 28	DAY; 16	KEN; 33	NHA; 16	IND; 19	POC; 17	GLN; 19	MCH; 21	BRI; 36	DAR; 13	RCH; 22	CHI; 28	NHA; 22	DOV; 22	CLT; 21	TAL; 11	KAN; 16	MAR; 30	TEX; 24	PHO; 11	HOM; 26	25th	593
2018	Ty Dillon	13	Chevy	DAY; 39	ATL; 26	LVS; 24	PHO; 30	CAL; 27	MAR; 22	TEX; 13	BRI; 28	RCH; 20	TAL; 15	DOV; 24	KAN; 38	CLT; 21	POC; 23	MCH; 21	SON; 33	CHI; 28	DAY; 6	KEN; 29	NHA; 23	POC; 24	GLN; 23	MCH; 38	BRI; 21	DAR; 21	IND; 21	LVS; 34	RCH; 28	CLT; 22	DOV; 29	TAL; 15	KAN; 25	MAR; 15	TEX; 22	PHO; 19	HOM; 22	29th	482
2019	Ty Dillon	13	Chevy	DAY; 6	ATL; 25	LVS; 29	PHO; 15	CAL; 27	MAR; 13	TEX; 21	BRI; 15	RCH; 21	TAL; 17	DOV; 22	KAN; 28	CLT; 23	POC; 27	MCH; 22	SON; 27	CHI; 35	DAY; 4	KEN; 26	NHA; 16	POC; 29	GLN; 30	MCH; 11	BRI; 20	DAR; 20	IND; 13	LVS; 16	RCH; 26	CLT; 15	DOV; 23	TAL; 10	KAN; 22	MAR; 24	TEX; 18	PHO; 20	HOM; 24	24th	613
2020	Ty Dillon	13	Chevy	DAY; 30	LVS; 10	CAL; 26	PHO; 15	DAR; 19	DAR; 19	CLT; 25	CLT; 27	BRI; 39	ATL; 29	MAR; 22	HOM; 28	TAL; 12	POC; 26	POC; 23	IND; 14	KEN; 16	TEX; 35	KAN; 15	NHA; 22	MCH; 23	MCH; 18	DAY; 20	DOV; 18	DOV; 29	DAY; 22	DAR; 27	RCH; 28	BRI; 18	LVS; 26	TAL; 3	CLT; 23	KAN; 24	TEX; 24	MAR; 16	PHO; 21	27th	556

=== Cars No. 35,60,27 history ===
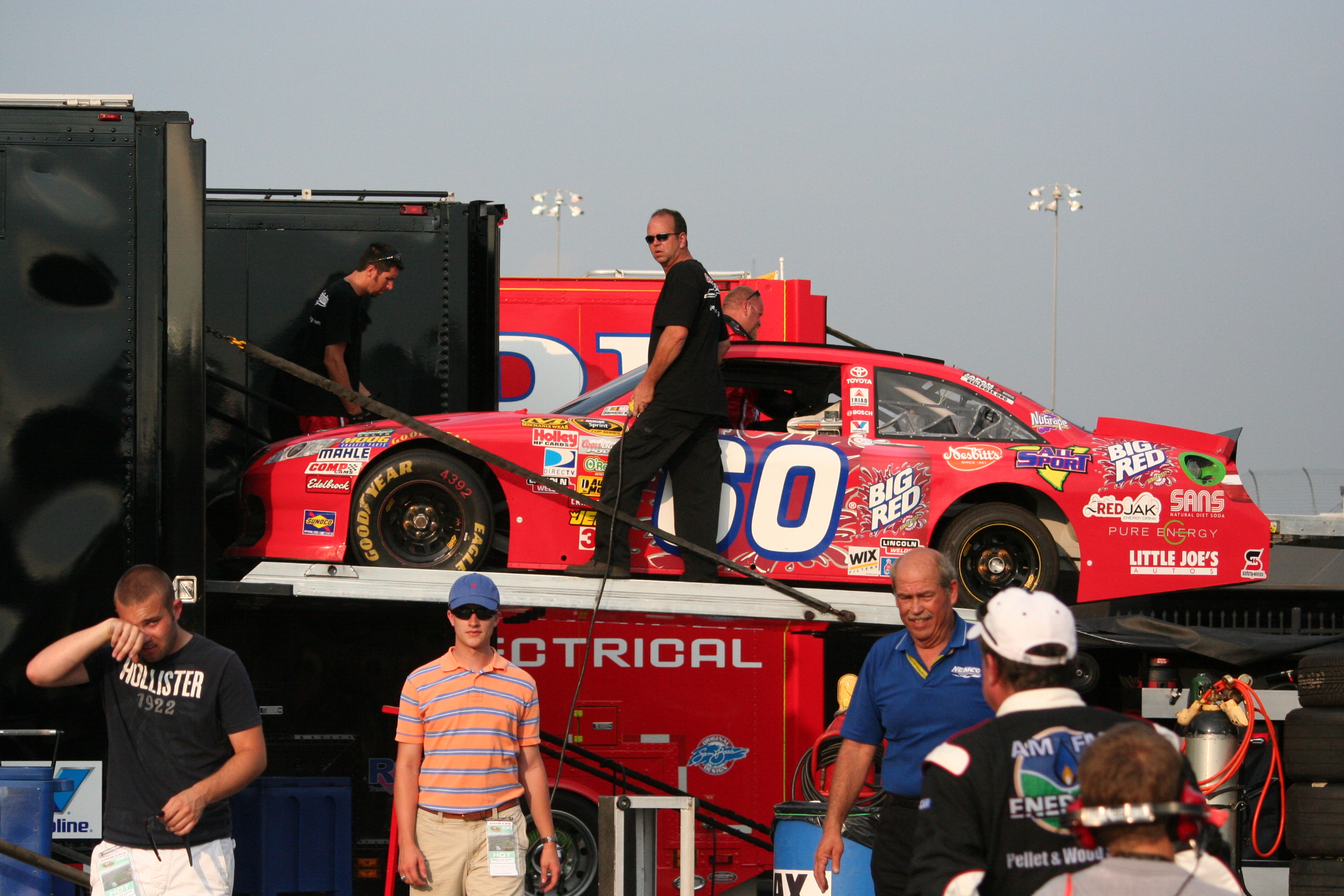
The No. 60 at Charlotte

The No. 60 Toyota Camry debuted in 2011 with Todd Bodine driving and received sponsorship from Tire Kingdom for the Daytona 500. Bodine and team did not qualify for the event. For the rest of 2011, Landon Cassill and Mike Skinner ran the car with sponsorship from Big Red as a start and park ride to gain enough funds for the No. 13 to race on weekends that GEICO is not the sponsor. From Atlanta No. 60 has switched to Chevrolet . In October 2011, Germain Racing parked the No. 60 ride for the remainder of the season after running 20 races, but never finishing better than 38th.

The team's second car returned as the No. 27 for the 2019 Daytona 500 with Casey Mears as the driver. As a result of an accident on lap 104, Mears finished 40th in the race.

==== Car No. 27 results ====
Year	Driver	No.	Make	1	2	3	4	5	6	7	8	9	10	11	12	13	14	15	16	17	18	19	20	21	22	23	24	25	26	27	28	29	30	31	32	33	34	35	36	Owners	Pts
2009	Todd Bodine	35	Toyota	DAY	CAL	LVS	ATL; DNQ	BRI	MAR	TEX	PHO	TAL	RCH	DAR	CLT	DOV	POC	MCH	SON	NHA	DAY	CHI	IND	POC	GLN	MCH	BRI	ATL	RCH	NHA	DOV	KAN	CAL	CLT	MAR	TAL	TEX	PHO	HOM	63rd	31
2011	Todd Bodine	60	Toyota	DAY; DNQ				CAL; 40																																46th	51
2011	Landon Cassill	60	Toyota		PHO; 38	LVS; 43	BRI; 42																																	46th	51
2011	Mike Skinner	60	Toyota						MAR; 42	TEX; 43	TAL; DNQ	RCH; 41	DAR; 40	DOV; 41	CLT; 43	KAN; 40	POC; DNQ	MCH; DNQ	SON; 42	DAY; 40	KEN; 43	NHA; 42	IND; 40	POC; DNQ	GLN; 43	MCH; 42	BRI; 41				NHA; Wth	DOV; DNQ	KAN; DNQ	CLT; Wth	TAL	MAR	TEX	PHO	HOM	46th	51
2011	Mike Skinner	60	Chevy																										RCH; DNQ	CHI; DNQ										46th	51
2011	Dave Blaney	60	Chevy																									ATL; 43												46th	51
2019	Casey Mears	27	Chevy	DAY; 40	ATL	LVS	PHO	CAL	MAR	TEX	BRI	RCH	TAL	DOV	KAN	CLT	POC	MCH	SON	CHI	DAY	KEN	NHA	POC	GLN	MCH	BRI	DAR	IND	LVS	RCH	CLT	DOV	TAL	KAN	MAR	TEX	PHO	HOM	46th	1

== Nationwide Series ==
=== Car No. 03 history ===
Germain debuted in the Nationwide Series in 2007 with the No. 03 Germain Toyota Camry with Todd Bodine driving. He finished in the top-ten in his first two attempts, and ran three more races after that. The car did not run again until 2008, when Bodine drove to a fourth-place finish. Michael Annett made the next attempt at the season-ending race at Homestead, where he finished 36th after a crash.

==== Car No. 03 results ====
Year	Driver	No.	Make	1	2	3	4	5	6	7	8	9	10	11	12	13	14	15	16	17	18	19	20	21	22	23	24	25	26	27	28	29	30	31	32	33	34	35	Owners	Pts
2007	Todd Bodine	03	Toyota	DAY	CAL	MXC	LVS	ATL	BRI	NSH	TEX	PHO	TAL	RCH	DAR	CLT	DOV	NSH	KEN	MLW	NHA	DAY	CHI	GTY; 10	IRP	CGV	GLN	MCH; 8	BRI	CAL	RCH; 20	DOV	KAN; 14	CLT	MEM	TEX	PHO	HOM; 37	53rd	557
2008	Todd Bodine	03	Toyota	DAY	CAL	LVS	ATL	BRI	NSH	TEX	PHO	MXC	TAL	RCH	DAR; 4	CLT	DOV	NSH	KEN	MLW	NHA	DAY	CHI	GTY	IRP	CGV	GLN	MCH	BRI	CAL	RCH	DOV	KAN						62nd	222
2008	Justin Marks	03	Toyota																															CLT; DNQ	MEM	TEX	PHO		62nd	222
2008	Michael Annett	03	Toyota																																			HOM; 36	62nd	222

=== Car No. 15 history ===
Mike Wallace (2008)

Germain Racing fielded its first full-time entry in the Nationwide Series in 2008, with Mike Wallace driving. Wallace brought his car number, 7, and his sponsor, GEICO, with him from Phoenix Racing. The team purchased the legal assets of the former Busch Series team of Yates Racing for purposes of an exemption as part of NASCAR's all-exempt tour policy in the three national series. Wallace finished eighth in his first and only season with Germain with 1 top-5 and 8 top-10s. After the end of the 2008 season, GEICO moved to the Cup Series due to a conflict of interest with series sponsor Nationwide.

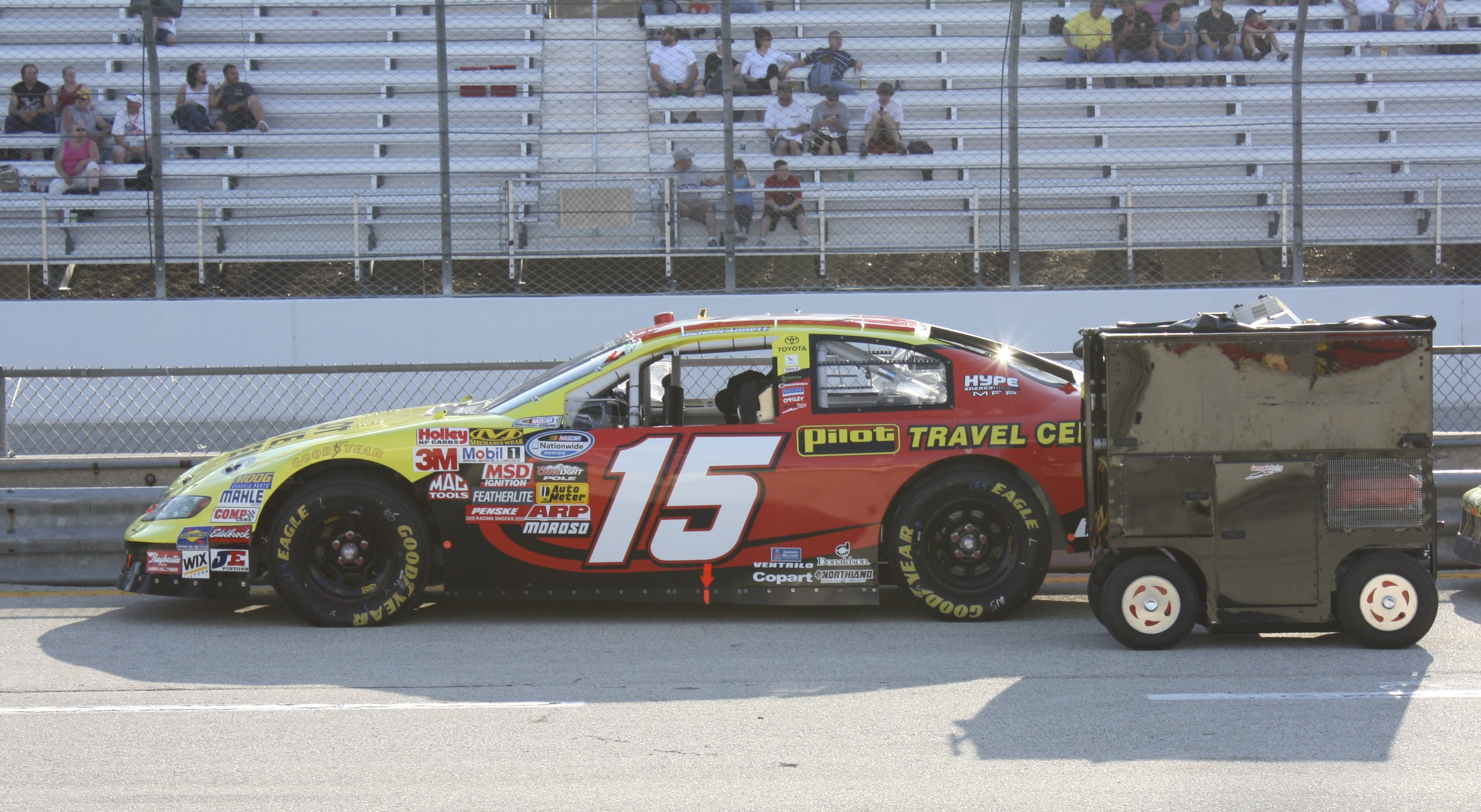
Michael Annett in 2009.

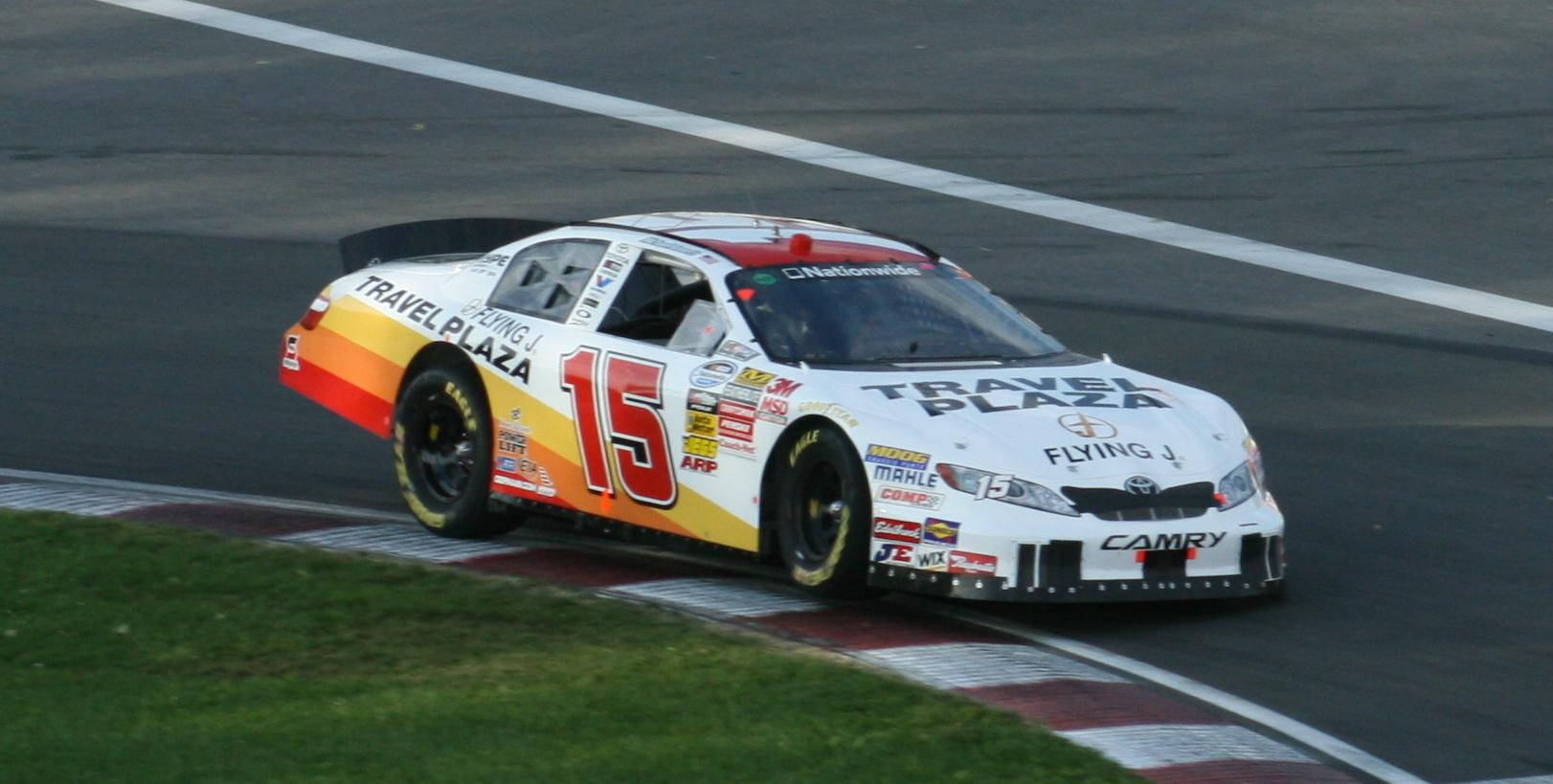
Annett in 2010.

Michael Annett (2009-2010)

At the start of the 2009 season Germain changed the No. 7 team to No. 15 and hired Michael Annett for the season. Annett drove the No. 15 full-time in 2009, with HYPE Energy and Pilot Flying J sponsoring. Annett went on to finishing third in the Rookie of the Year battle and 10th in the overall driver points. He collected 4 top-10 finishes in his first full-time season.

In 2010, Annett continued driving for the team. Pilot Travel Centers continued their sponsorship of Annett and the team. Annett finished the year with 2 top-10s en route to a 13th-place finish in the final standings.

Transfer to Rick Ware Racing (2011)

For 2011 Annett moved to Rusty Wallace Racing's No. 62 for 2011, bringing Pilot Travel Centers with him. Todd Bodine drove the No. 15 at Daytona with Tire Kingdom as the sponsor, as rookie driver Timmy Hill was under 18 and not eligible to run in a national touring series. After Daytona, the No. 15 owner points were sold to Hill's team Rick Ware Racing.

==== Car No. 15 results ====
Year	Driver	No.	Make	1	2	3	4	5	6	7	8	9	10	11	12	13	14	15	16	17	18	19	20	21	22	23	24	25	26	27	28	29	30	31	32	33	34	35	Owners	Pts
2008	Mike Wallace	7	Toyota	DAY; 24	CAL; 16	LVS; 7	ATL; 17	BRI; 10	NSH; 20	TEX; 25	PHO; 15	MXC; 12	TAL; 10	RCH; 13	DAR; 25	CLT; 22	DOV; 8	NSH; 6	KEN; 3	MLW; 18	NHA; 15	DAY; 22	CHI; 20	GTY; 11	IRP; 17	CGV; 15	GLN; 18	MCH; 15	BRI; 35	CAL; 16	RCH; 15	DOV; 12	KAN; 15	CLT; 10	MEM; 14	TEX; 12	PHO; 9	HOM; 18	13th	4128
2009	Michael Annett	15	Toyota	DAY; 35	CAL; 16	LVS; 32	BRI; 20	TEX; 11	NSH; 19	PHO; 16	TAL; 21	RCH; 34	DAR; 29	CLT; 39	DOV; 19	NSH; 27	KEN; 7	MLW; 28	NHA; 19	DAY; 35	CHI; 17	GTY; 7	IRP; 35	IOW; 11	GLN; 20	MCH; 13	BRI; 8	CGV; 18	ATL; 14	RCH; 25	DOV; 13	KAN; 30	CAL; 6	CLT; 13	MEM; 16	TEX; 22	PHO; 20	HOM; 21	18th	3598
2010	Michael Annett	15	Toyota	DAY; 12	CAL; 17	LVS; 33	BRI; 20	NSH; 9	PHO; 33	TEX; 16	TAL; 43	RCH; 26	DAR; 11	DOV; 15	CLT; 14	NSH; 14	KEN; 34	ROA; 24	NHA; 19	DAY; 12	CHI; 14	GTY; 11	IRP; 19	IOW; 7	GLN; 19	MCH; 16	BRI; 18	CGV; 25	ATL; 21	RCH; 20	DOV; 15	KAN; 16	CAL; 20	CLT; 36	GTY; 21	TEX; 18	PHO; 18	HOM; 24	14th	3651
2011	Todd Bodine	15	Toyota	DAY; 18	PHO	LVS	BRI	CAL	TEX	TAL	NSH	RCH	DAR	DOV	IOW	CLT	CHI	MCH	ROA	DAY	KEN	NHA	NSH	IRP	IOW	GLN	CGV	BRI	ATL	RCH	CHI	DOV	KAN	CLT	TEX	PHO	HOM		24th*	681*

- Includes points scored after Rick Ware Racing took over the entry but only results scored by Germain Racing are shown.

== Camping World Truck Series ==
=== Truck No. 9 history ===
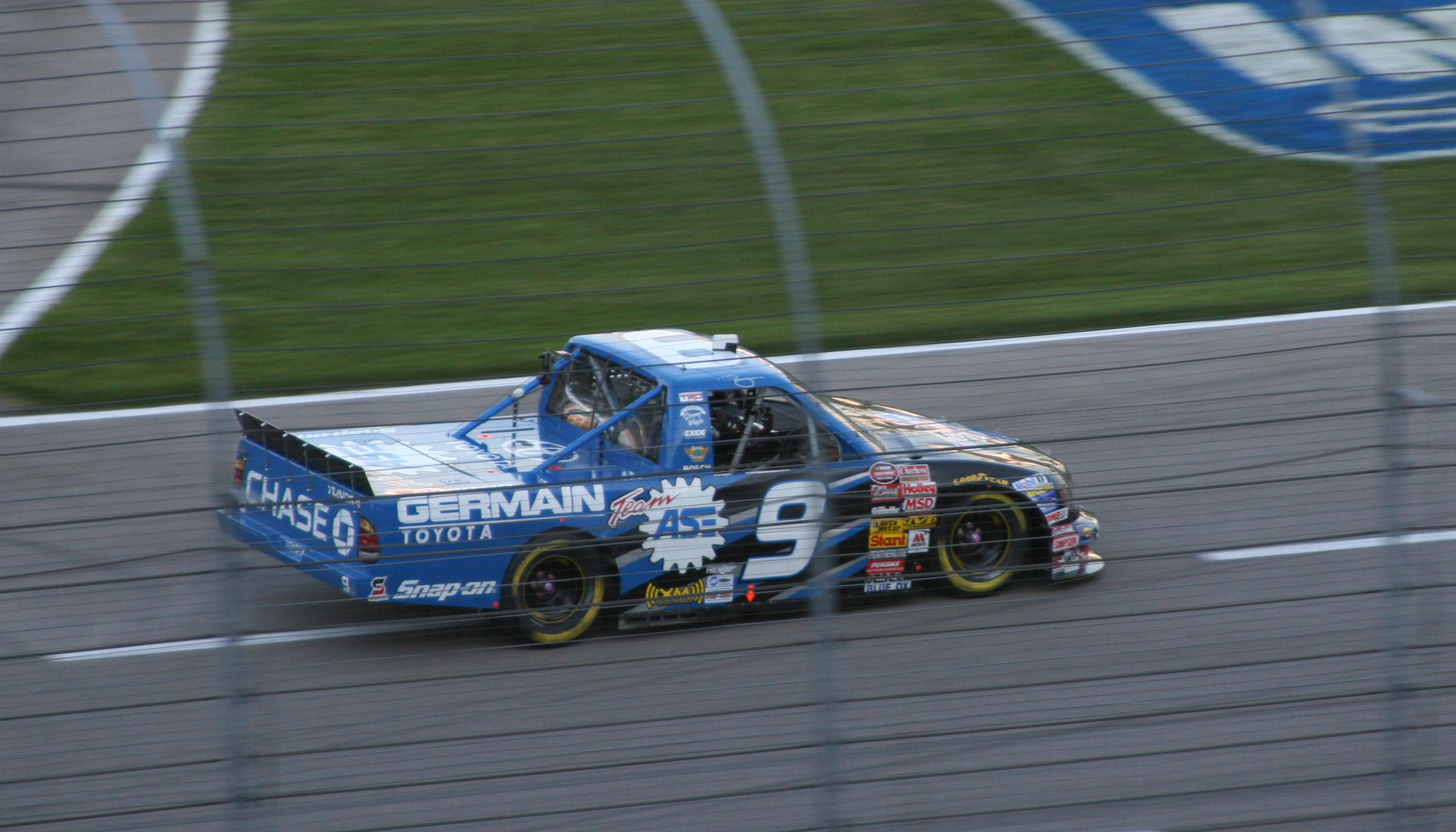
Musgrave's 2006 No. 9 truck

Shigeaki Hattori (2005)

The No. 9 Toyota Tundra debuted at Daytona in 2005 with rookie Shigeaki Hattori behind the wheel in a partnership with Arnold Motorsports, the team was called Germain-Arnold Racing. Although he had two seventh place starts, Hattori struggled in his transition to stock cars, and was released towards the end of the season, and replaced by Justin Hobgood, whose best finish was a 20th at Phoenix.

Ted Musgrave (2006-2007)

2005 champion Ted Musgrave, whose team, Ultra Motorsports, had shut down only days before preseason testing, came to the team with a sponsor in Team ASE. He went the entire 2006 season without a win, before picking up a win at Texas in 2007. Musgrave, in 2007, was also suspended for one race for intentionally running into Kelly Bires under a caution flag, which resulted in Germain putting Brad Keselowski in the #9 truck, ultimately launching Keselowski's career off the ground.

Justin Marks (2008)

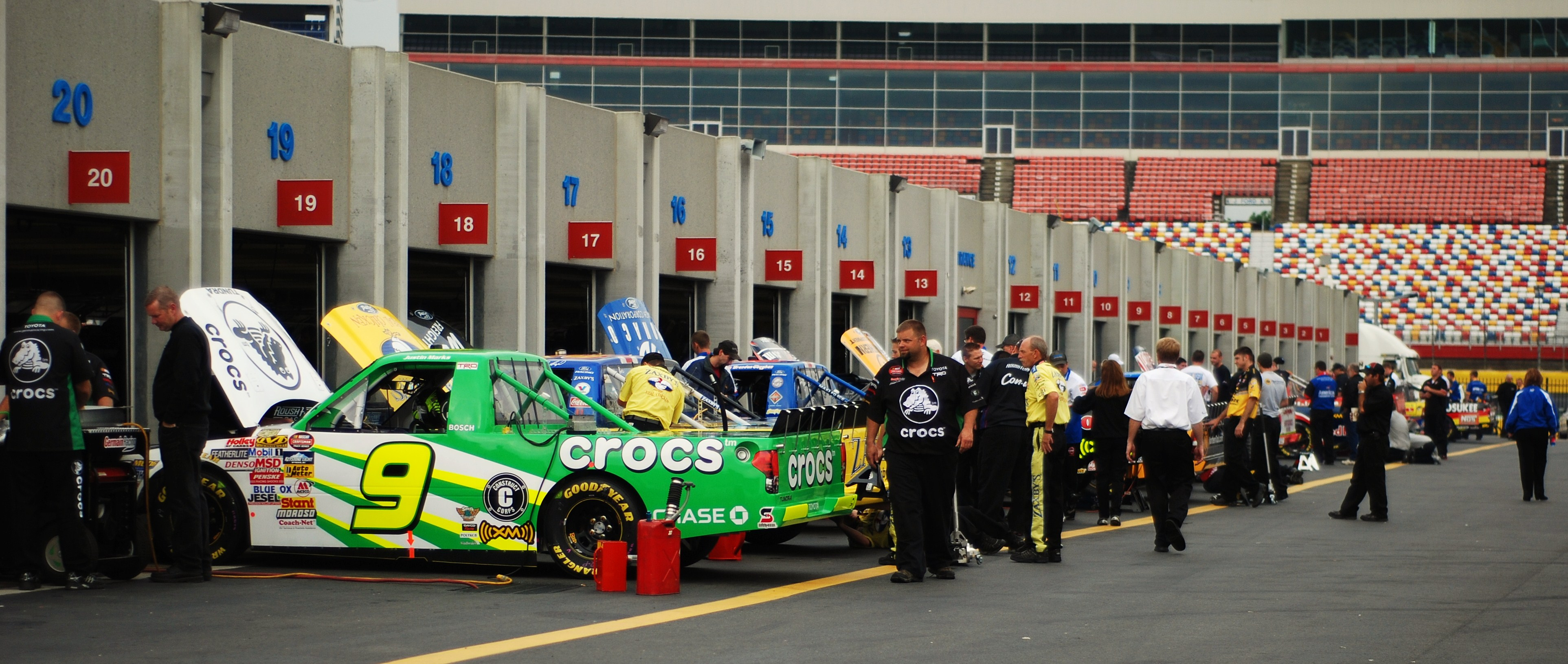
Justin Marks' truck at Charlotte in 2008.

ARCA RE/MAX Series driver Justin Marks replaced Musgrave in the No. 9 with sponsorship from Construct Corps/Crocs. Marks had one pole and an eighth-place finish but he was replaced later in the year. The No. 9 truck was filled for the rest of the year by Chrissy Wallace, Michael Annett, David Reutimann, Paul Tracy, and Sean Caisse.

Max Papis (2009-2011)

The No. 9 only ran a limited number of races in 2009 and 2010 with Max Papis, and sponsor GEICO.

Papis drove the No. 9 full-time in 2011 with GEICO sponsoring, but only managed two top-10 finishes and finished 18th in points. For 2012, Germain shut down their truck operations and GEICO moved up to the Sprint Cup Series with Mears.

==== Truck No. 9 results ====
Year	Driver	No.	Make	1	2	3	4	5	6	7	8	9	10	11	12	13	14	15	16	17	18	19	20	21	22	23	24	25	Owners	Pts
2005	Shigeaki Hattori	9	Toyota	DAY; 34	CAL; 30	ATL; 27	MAR; DNQ	GTY; 27	MFD; 36	CLT; 34	DOV	TEX; 35	MCH; 27	MLW; DNQ	KAN	KEN; 24	MEM	IRP	NSH; 35	BRI									37th	1039
2005	Justin Hobgood	9	Toyota																		RCH; 23	NHA	LVS	MAR	ATL; DNQ	TEX; DNQ	PHO; 20	HOM; 35	37th	1039
2006	Ted Musgrave	9	Toyota	DAY; 3	CAL; 3	ATL; 4	MAR; 2	GTY; 2	CLT; 4	MFD; 16	DOV; 18	TEX; 7	MCH; 23	MLW; 24	KAN; 22	KEN; 6	MEM; 19	IRP; 8	NSH; 4	BRI; 3	NHA; 31	LVS; 2	TAL; 3	MAR; 15*	ATL; 24	TEX; 11	PHO; 19	HOM; 33	7th	3314
2007	Ted Musgrave	9	Toyota	DAY; 9	CAL; 5	ATL; 8	MAR; 5	KAN; 12	CLT; 5	MFD; 8	DOV; 20	TEX; 9	MCH; 5	MLW; 34		KEN; 3	IRP; 12	NSH; 8	BRI; 27	GTW; 3	NHA; 7	LVS; 15	TAL; 25	MAR; 8	ATL; 9	TEX; 1	PHO; 11	HOM; 18	7th	3303
2007	Brad Keselowski	9	Toyota												MEM; 16														7th	3303
2008	Justin Marks	9	Toyota	DAY; 8	CAL; 33	ATL; 14	MAR; 20	KAN; 11	CLT; 32	MFD; 18	DOV; 16	TEX; 14	MCH; 13	MLW; 25	MEM; 24	KEN; 31	IRP; 30	NSH; 20	BRI; 22	GTW; 27		LVS; 29							24th	2485
2008	David Reutimann	9	Toyota																		NHA; 13								24th	2485
2008	Mike Wallace	9	Toyota																				TAL; 5						24th	2485
2008	Sean Caisse	9	Toyota																					MAR; 36					24th	2485
2008	Chrissy Wallace	9	Toyota																						ATL; 25			HOM; 31	24th	2485
2008	Paul Tracy	9	Toyota																							TEX; 20			24th	2485
2008	Michael Annett	9	Toyota																								PHO; 18		24th	2485
2009	Max Papis	9	Toyota	DAY	CAL; 10	ATL; 20	MAR; 13	KAN	CLT	DOV; 16	TEX	MCH	MLW	MEM	KEN	IRP	NSH	BRI; 28	CHI	IOW	GTW	NHA; 22	LVS; 18	MAR; 21	TAL; 22	TEX	PHO	HOM	31st	958
2010	Max Papis	9	Toyota	DAY; 21	ATL	MAR; 8	NSH	KAN	DOV; 29	CLT	TEX	MCH	IOW	GTY; 15	IRP	POC	NSH	DAR	BRI; 14	CHI	KEN	NHA			TAL; 27	TEX; 23		HOM; 18	33rd	1087
2010	Justin Hobgood	9	Toyota																				LVS; 35						33rd	1087
2010	B. J. McLeod	9	Toyota																					MAR; 17					33rd	1087
2010	Tom Hessert III	9	Toyota																								PHO; 31		33rd	1087
2011	Max Papis	9	Toyota	DAY; 12	PHO; 15	DAR; 18	MAR; 10	NSH; 23	DOV; 13	CLT; 25	KAN; 22	TEX; 15	KEN; 11	IOW; 20	NSH; 27	IRP; 18	POC; 11	MCH; 19	BRI; 26	ATL; 14	CHI; 18	NHA; 20	KEN; 28	LVS; 29	TAL; 10	MAR; 18	TEX; 14	HOM; 21	21st	643

=== Truck No. 30 history ===
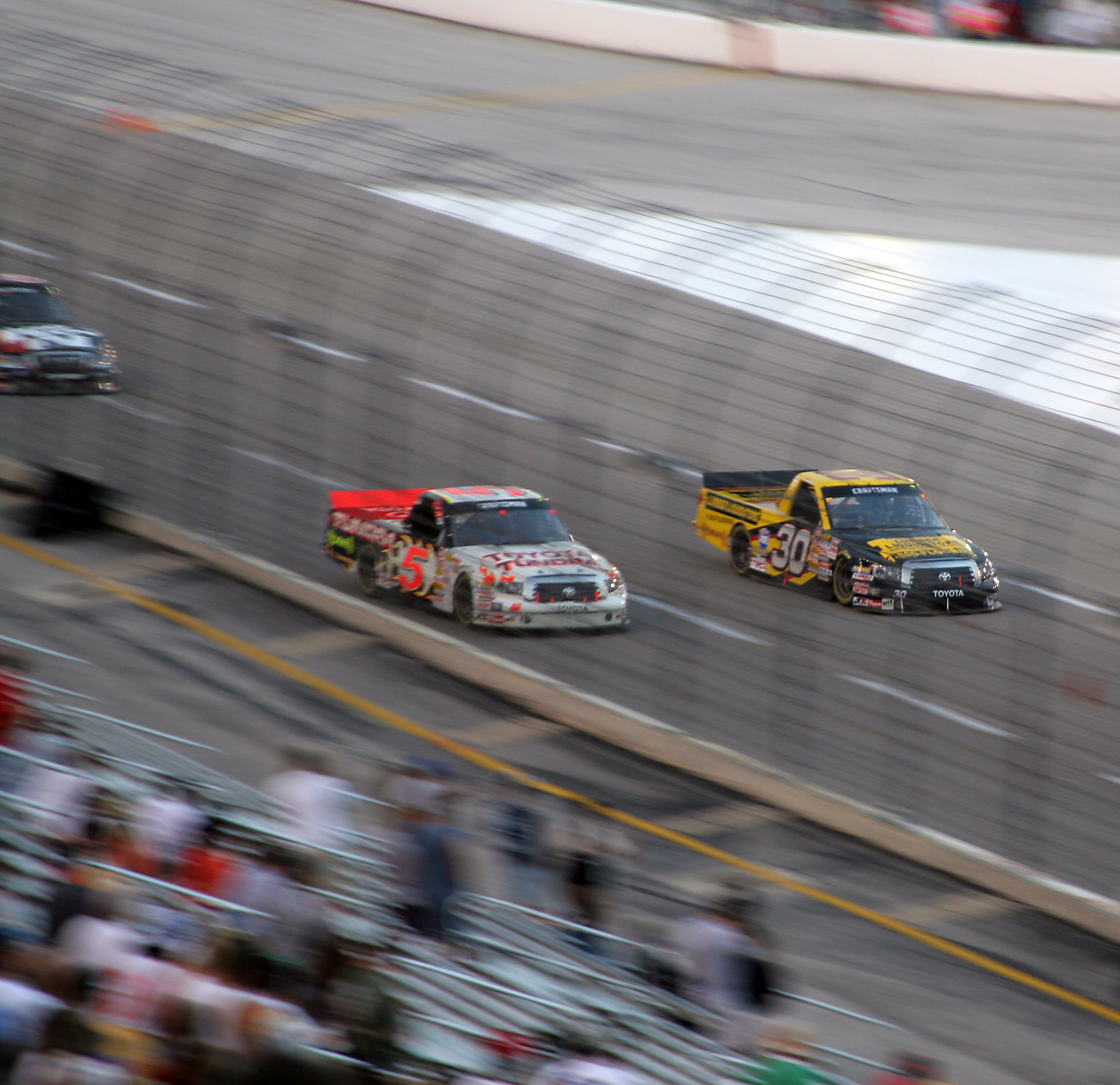
Todd Bodine (right) racing fellow Truck Series champion Mike Skinner in 2007.

Todd Bodine (2004)

Germain debuted with this truck in 2004 at the Kroger 200, where Todd Bodine finished fourth after starting third in the No. 30 truck. Bodine won two races that year Fontana and Texas, before missing the field at the Ford 200.

Chad Chaffin (2005)

Bodine left for Fiddleback Racing in 2005, and was replaced by Chad Chaffin. Chaffin recorded four top tens with the team before he left to join upstart team Wyler Racing after Michigan.

Todd Bodine returns (2005-2011)

Bodine would return to the team after Fiddleback Racing shut down. The Bodine-Germain combination would win five races together, ending up with a third-place points finish.

Lumber Liquidators became the team's new primary sponsor in 2006, and Bodine and crew would take home 3 victories along with the Truck championship. In the 2007 season, Bodine won at Texas and Talladega and finished fourth in points. He won an additional three races in 2008 and moved up to third in points. Lumber Liquidators left the team after 2008, but Bodine still won the first race of the season in 2009. Copart and Ventrilo sponsored the team for most of the season, and Bodine finished 4th in points. GEICO sponsored the truck for the first race at Daytona, but the team ran without sponsorship for most of the season. Bodine won his second championship in 2010.

Bodine and the No. 30 team ran the first ten races of the season before parking the truck due to lack of sponsorship. Bodine ran the No. 5 truck due to a new partnership between Germain Racing and Randy Moss Motorsports. In 2012, Germain Racing shut down its truck operations due to a lack of sponsorship. Bodine moved to Red Horse Racing, while Germain sold its Truck Series equipment to former manager Mike Hillman Sr., who started his own race team.

==== Truck No. 30 results ====
Year	Driver	No.	Make	1	2	3	4	5	6	7	8	9	10	11	12	13	14	15	16	17	18	19	20	21	22	23	24	25	Owners	Pts
2004	Todd Bodine	30	Toyota	DAY	ATL	MAR	MFD	CLT	DOV	TEX	MEM	MLW	KAN	KEN	GTY	MCH	IRP	NSH	BRI	RCH; 4	NHA; 34	LVS; 2	CAL; 1	TEX; 1*	MAR; 7	PHO; 29	DAR; 20	HOM; DNQ	34th	1136
2005	Chad Chaffin	30	Toyota	DAY; 21	CAL; 28	ATL; 7	MAR; 5	GTY; 9	MFD; 32	CLT; 30	DOV; 23	TEX; 23	MCH; 7																3rd	3411
2005	Todd Bodine	30	Toyota											MLW; 34	KAN; 1*	KEN; 2	MEM; 23	IRP; 15	NSH; 3	BRI; 2	RCH; 2	NHA; 22	LVS; 1*	MAR; 10	ATL; 2	TEX; 1	PHO; 1	HOM; 1*	3rd	3411
2006	Todd Bodine	30	Toyota	DAY; 2	CAL; 2	ATL; 1	MAR; 12	GTY; 1*	CLT; 3	MFD; 15	DOV; 3	TEX; 1	MCH; 4	MLW; 20	KAN; 7	KEN; 10	MEM; 15	IRP; 7	NSH; 8	BRI; 2	NHA; 4	LVS; 12	TAL; 4	MAR; 14	ATL; 25	TEX; 14	PHO; 4	HOM; 21	1st	3666
2007	Todd Bodine	30	Toyota	DAY; 5	CAL; 7	ATL; 2	MAR; 2	KAN; 7	CLT; 3	MFD; 31	DOV; 11	TEX; 1	MCH; 7	MLW; 3	MEM; 8	KEN; 11	IRP; 6	NSH; 5	BRI; 24	GTY; 4	NHA; 4	LVS; 28	TAL; 1*	MAR; 20	ATL; 24	TEX; 16	PHO; 6	HOM; 14	4th	3525
2008	Todd Bodine	30	Toyota	DAY; 1*	CAL; 2	ATL; 9	MAR; 12	KAN; 23	CLT; 12	MFD; 3	DOV; 29	TEX; 5	MCH; 4	MLW; 5	MEM; 14	KEN; 27	IRP; 22	NSH; 3*	BRI; 2	GTY; 4	NHA; 19	LVS; 9	TAL; 1	MAR; 5	ATL; 4	TEX; 4	PHO; 3	HOM; 1	4th	3621
2009	Todd Bodine	30	Toyota	DAY; 1*	CAL; 2	ATL; 3	MAR; 18	KAN; 21	CLT; 25	DOV; 18	TEX; 1	MCH; 13	MLW; 4	MEM; 10	KEN; 16*	IRP; 18	NSH; 13	BRI; 32	CHI; 2	IOW; 19	GTY; 18	NHA; 24	LVS; 4	MAR; 2	TAL; 3	TEX; 4	PHO; 12	HOM; 5	6th	3432
2010	Todd Bodine	30	Toyota	DAY; 2*	ATL; 5	MAR; 30	NSH; 5	KAN; 3	DOV; 5	CLT; 2	TEX; 1*	MCH; 2*	IOW; 17	GTY; 4	IRP; 7	POC; 12	NSH; 1*	DAR; 1*	BRI; 6	CHI; 2	KEN; 1	NHA; 9	LVS; 4	MAR; 3*	TAL; 18	TEX; 4	PHO; 12	HOM; 4	1st	3937
2011	Todd Bodine	30	Toyota	DAY; 23	PHO; 14	DAR; 3	MAR; 14	NSH; 19	DOV; 27	CLT; 27	KAN; 3	TEX; 31	KEN; 4	IOW	NSH	IRP	POC	MCH	BRI	ATL	CHI	NHA	KEN	LVS	TAL	MAR	TEX	HOM	29th	277

=== Truck No. 62 history ===
Brendan Gaughan (2011)

The No. 62 truck ran only in 2011, as a full-time team with Brendan Gaughan driving the Toyota Tundra with sponsorship from South Point Hotel, Casino & Spa. Gaughan left for Richard Childress Racing taking his sponsorship with him after Germain shut down their truck teams.

==== Truck No. 62 results ====
Year	Driver	No.	Make	1	2	3	4	5	6	7	8	9	10	11	12	13	14	15	16	17	18	19	20	21	22	23	24	25	Owners	Pts
2011	Brendan Gaughan	62	Toyota	DAY; 27	PHO; 17	DAR; 25	MAR; 9	NSH; 17	DOV; 7	CLT; 30	KAN; 7	TEX; 14	KEN; 3	IOW; 16	NSH; 13	IRP; 16	POC; 22	MCH; 8	BRI; 20	ATL; 18	CHI; 14	NHA; 12	KEN; 19	LVS; 9	TAL; 8	MAR; 9	TEX; 31	HOM; 20	14th	713

=== Truck No. 77 history ===
The No. 77 truck was started off as the No. 03 truck. The No. 03 truck debuted in 2007 at Lowe's Motor Speedway with Justin Hobgood racing. He qualified eighth, but finished last after an early wreck. The next race for the team came at New Hampshire, but Sean Caisse did not qualify for the race. The following month, Justin Marks made his Truck Series debut at the Easy Care Vehicle Service Contracts 200, with voodoo ride sponsoring, finishing 22nd. Marks ran the final three races of the season, posting a best finish of eighth place at the Ford 200.

In 2008, the No. 03 truck again ran part-time, with Chrissy Wallace driving for four races, with her best finish being 18th in her debut at Martinsville Speedway. Dustin Skinner drove one race later in the season at Martinsville, but wrecked and finished 34th.

Chrissy Wallace was supposed to drive the No. 03 full-time in 2009, but failure to obtain sponsorship negated those plans, and the No. 03 shut down operations.

==== Truck No. 03 results ====
Year	Driver	No.	Make	1	2	3	4	5	6	7	8	9	10	11	12	13	14	15	16	17	18	19	20	21	22	23	24	25	Owners	Pts
2007	Justin Hobgood	03	Toyota	DAY	CAL	ATL	MAR	KAN	CLT; 36	MFD	DOV	TEX	MCH	MLW	MEM	KEN	IRP	NSH	BRI	GTW									36th	588
2007	Sean Caisse	03	Toyota																		NHA; DNQ	LVS							36th	588
2007	Mike Wallace	03	Toyota																				TAL; 17	MAR					36th	588
2007	Justin Marks	03	Toyota																						ATL; 22	TEX; 23	PHO; 25	HOM; 8	36th	588
2008	Chrissy Wallace	03	Toyota	DAY	CAL	ATL	MAR; 18	KAN	CLT	MFD	DOV	TEX	MCH	MLW; 20	MEM	KEN; 33	IRP	NSH	BRI	GTW; 19	NHA	LVS	TAL						39th	382
2008	Dustin Skinner	03	Toyota																					MAR; 34	ATL	TEX	PHO	HOM	39th	382

In 2010, Germain Racing ran the No. 77 truck part-time with many drivers. Miguel Paludo was the first to drive in 2010, qualifying for the second races at Bristol and Kentucky with sponsorship from Stemco/Duroline. Paludo finished 9th and 20th respectively. Next in the seat of the No. 77 was Jason Bowles who drove unsponsored at Las Vegas, bringing home a 16th-place finish. Tom Hessert III drove the truck at Homestead with sponsorship from Cherry Hill Classic Cars. He finished 29th.

The No. 77 began the 2011 season as a full-time team driven by ARCA Champion Justin Lofton. However, Lofton and Germain parted ways after Texas, with Lofton taking his sponsorship to Eddie Sharp Racing. The No. 77 was shut down following Lofton's departure.

==== Truck No. 77 results ====
Year	Driver	No.	Make	1	2	3	4	5	6	7	8	9	10	11	12	13	14	15	16	17	18	19	20	21	22	23	24	25	Owners	Pts
2010	Miguel Paludo	77	Toyota	DAY	ATL	MAR	NSH	KAN	DOV	CLT	TEX	MCH	IOW	GTY	IRP	POC	NSH	DAR	BRI; 9	CHI	KEN; 20	NHA							44th	432
2010	Jason Bowles	77	Toyota																				LVS; 16	MAR	TAL	TEX	PHO		44th	432
2010	Tom Hessert III	77	Toyota																									HOM; 29	44th	432
2011	Justin Lofton	77	Toyota	DAY; 18	PHO; 30	DAR; 13	MAR; 32	NSH; 16	DOV; 25	CLT; 13	KAN; 19	TEX; 10	KEN	IOW	NSH	IRP	POC	MCH	BRI	ATL	CHI	NHA	KEN	LVS	TAL	MAR	TEX	HOM	31st	221
