= Mike Skinner (racing driver) =

American racing driver

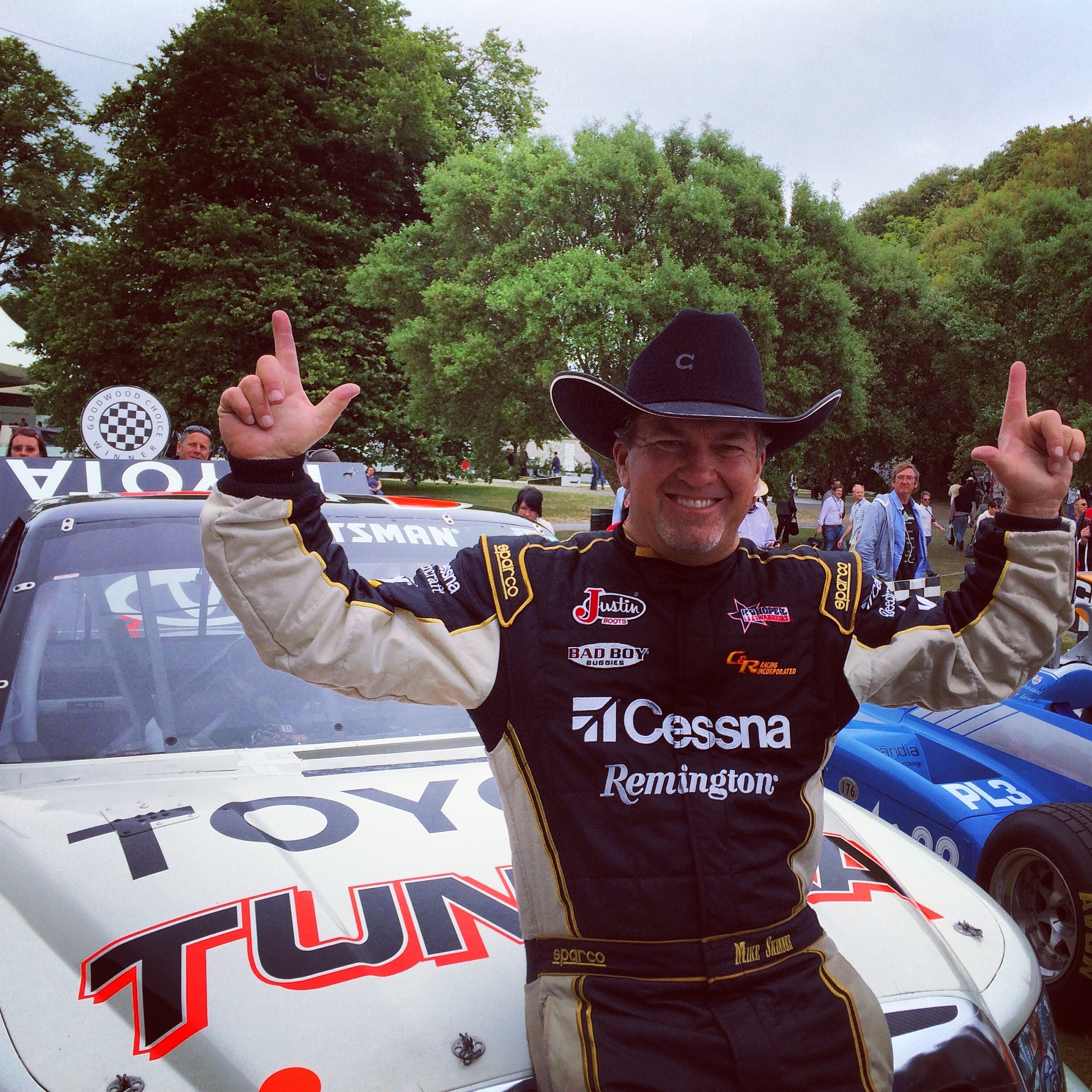
- Skinner at the Goodwood Festival of Speed in 2015
- Born: June 28, 1957 (age 69); Susanville, California, U.S.
- Achievements: 1995 NASCAR SuperTruck Series Champion; 1997 NASCAR Thunder Special Suzuka Winner; 1997 Daytona 500 pole winner
- Awards: 1997 Winston Cup Series Rookie of the Year; West Coast Stock Car Hall of Fame (2014)

NASCAR Cup Series career
- 286 races run over 22 years
- Best finish: 10th (1999)
- First race: 1986 Sovran Bank 500 (Martinsville)
- Last race: 2012 Pure Michigan 400 (Michigan)
Wins	Top tens	Poles
0	39	6

NASCAR O'Reilly Auto Parts Series career
- 52 races run over 8 years
- Best finish: 27th (2001)
- First race: 1987 Country Squire 200 (Darlington)
- Last race: 2006 Ford 300 (Homestead)
- First win: 1999 Yellow Freight 300 (Atlanta)
Wins	Top tens	Poles
1	16	3

NASCAR FedEx Freight Truck Series career
- 231 races run over 14 years
- Best finish: 1st (1995)
- First race: 1995 Skoal Bandit Copper World Classic (Phoenix)
- Last race: 2012 NextEra Energy Resources 250 (Daytona)
- First win: 1995 Skoal Bandit Copper World Classic (Phoenix)
- Last win: 2009 Copart 200 (Gateway)
Wins	Top tens	Poles
28	144	50
- Statistics up to date as of April 22, 2013.

Michael Curtis Skinner (born June 28, 1957) is an American former stock car racing driver. He has competed in the NASCAR Sprint Cup Series, NASCAR Busch Series and NASCAR Craftsman World Truck Series, and he was the first ever champion of the latter in 1995. He has most recently driven the No. 98 Ford Fusion for Phil Parsons Racing in the Cup Series. He is the father of former NASCAR drivers Jamie Skinner and Dustin Skinner. He was born in Susanville, California.

Skinner appeared as the test driver for the first series of The Grand Tour. He was known as "The American," in humorous contrast to the main presenters, who are British. He appeared in the series for one season, until he was replaced with Abbie Eaton.

== Racing career ==
=== Early career ===
Skinner began his racing career at Susanville Speedway in the 1970s in a Plymouth Road Runner and at various California dirt tracks, winning three championships. He soon moved to North Carolina and worked as a crew member for Rusty Wallace and at Petty Enterprises. In 1986, he made his NASCAR debut in the Winston Cup Series, driving the No. 19 Pontiac for the Zanworth Racing Team, and had a best finish of 22nd in three starts. The following year, he made his Busch Series debut at Darlington Raceway, finishing 27th in the No. 0 Hunt Tire-sponsored Oldsmobile. He did not compete in NASCAR again until 1990, when he drove the No. 13 Glidden Paints-sponsored Buick for Mansion Motorsports at North Carolina Speedway, finishing 35th with rear end failure. He ran four races for Dixon over the next two years, before running one race in 1993 for Jimmy Means.

In 1994, Skinner began racing late models for Gene Petty, and won a local track championship. He and Petty also began racing in the Busch Series in the No. 88, winning one pole in the Kentucky Fried Chicken-sponsored Chevrolet, but failing to finish a race.

=== Richard Childress Racing ===
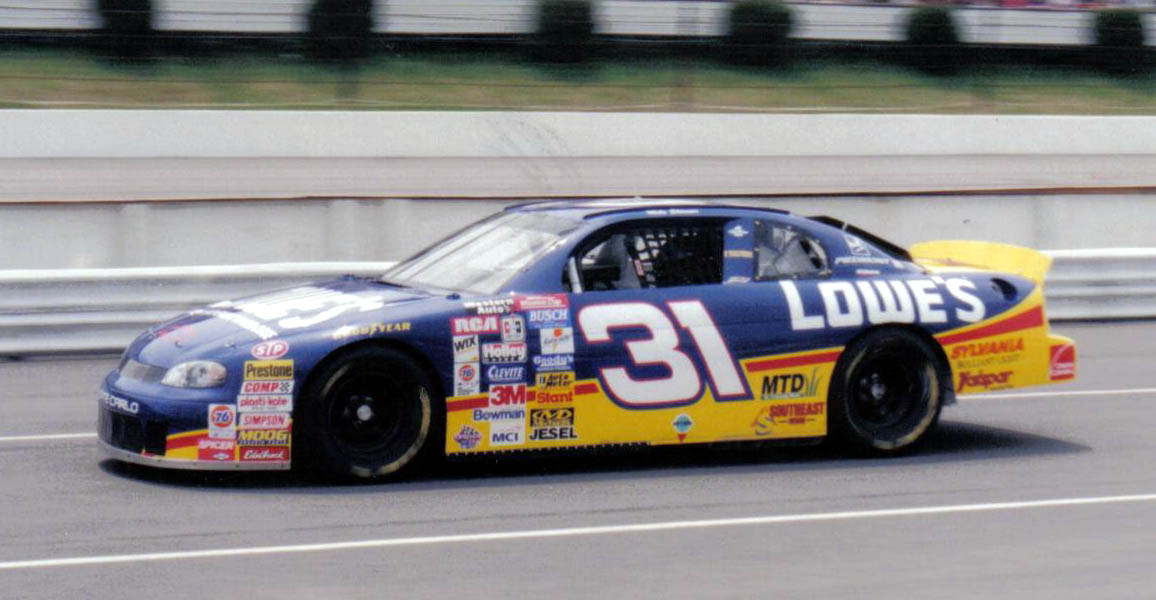
1997 Cup racecar

Skinner was chosen by Richard Childress Racing to drive the No. 3 GM Goodwrench Chevrolet C/K for the first NASCAR SuperTruck Series season. He won the first race in the series, and collected a total of eight wins, seventeen top-five finishes, eighteen top-ten finishes, ten poles, an average start of 3.9 and an average finish of 4.8, the route to winning the first championship. He equaled his win total the following season, but fell to third in the standings. That year, he ran five races for RCR in the Winston Cup Series, qualifying in the top-ten three times and having a best finish of twelfth in the No. 31 Realtree-sponsored car. He also filled in for teammate Dale Earnhardt when Earnhardt was recovering from injuries suffered in a wreck at Talladega, where he flipped after contact with Sterling Marlin.

In the 1997 NASCAR Winston Cup season, Skinner was promoted to full-time, driving the No. 31 for RCR with a sponsorship from Lowe's. He won poles at both of the season's races at Daytona International Speedway and had three top ten finishes. Despite failing to qualify for one race and a thirtieth-place points finish, he won the Rookie of the Year award. He had nine top-tens during his sophomore season, but finished 21st in points after being forced sit out three races due to injury. In summer of 1998, amid rumors that he was about to be dismissed by RCR, Skinner came close to his first Cup Series win at Watkins Glen, leading 17 laps late in the race before being passed by Jeff Gordon with three laps to go.

He also won two exhibition races in Japan during his first two seasons, when NASCAR held races in Asia for the first time. He finished no worse than sixth in the first four races of the 1999 season, and held the points lead briefly during the early portion of the season. He had a total of five top-five finishes, fourteen top-ten finishes, two poles, and ended the year with a career-best tenth place in the point standings. He also raced in thirteen races in the Busch Series, driving the No. 19 Yellow Freight Systems-sponsored Chevy for Emerald Performance Group. He won his only career Busch Series race at Atlanta after being disqualified for a rules infraction, before NASCAR overturned its decision.

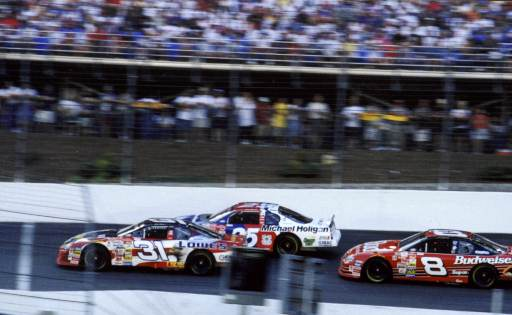
Skinner races the No. 31 Chevrolet in the 2000 Coca-Cola 600.

Skinner had 11 Top 10s in the 2000 season, but fell to twelfth in points and lost his crew chief Larry McReynolds, who retired from NASCAR to broadcast the series on Fox Sports.

In the 2001 season, he had only one top ten and suffered severe injuries in a wreck at Chicagoland Speedway after cutting a right-front tire and crashing head-first in turn 1. He was forced to miss the next five races because he suffered a concussion, a broken ankle, and a torn ACL in the crash. Free agent driver Robby Gordon was tapped to replace him and had a few top-tens. Then the news broke out that Gordon would replace Skinner in the No. 31 Chevy after the 2001 season, and that Lowe's resigned from RCR to sponsor Jeff Gordon and Rick Hendrick's co-owned team for the rookie Jimmie Johnson in 2002. Skinner returned at Michigan, but after another accident at Richmond, Skinner opted for surgery to repair his ACL. He announced the next morning after the accident that he would miss the remainder of the season. In his announcement, he bid farewell to Richard Childress and his team; he also announced that Robby Gordon would replace him again and wished him luck.

Robby Gordon finished off the season with an upset victory at New Hampshire.

=== 2002–2017 ===
Skinner signed on to drive the No. 4 Kodak Chevy for Morgan-McClure Motorsports in the 2002 season. During the 2001 season, the Morgan-McClure team employed several drivers and had six top-fifteen finishes. In 2002, Skinner had a sixth-place finish at Rockingham but only managed three top-fifteen finishes while finishing 31st in the final points standings. The team switched to Pontiac for the 2003 season, after Joe Gibbs Racing went to Chevrolet and picked up manufacturer support. Skinner continued to struggle. After failing to qualify for the Sirius 400 at Michigan, Skinner was released after fourteen races. Later in the season, he ran four Truck Series races for Billy Ballew Motorsports and returned to the cup series to replace Jerry Nadeau in the No. 01 U.S. Army sponsored car for MBV Motorsports in eleven races. His highlight and lowlight of that car came at a weekend in Richmond, he wrecked his first car in practice after getting loose, Then, after unrolling the backup, earned the pole. After hitting oil in Happy Hour, he had to then go to a third car which was a car that was supposed to run next weekend at Loudon. He continued to run the No. 01 until Martinsville when Joe Nemechek went to drive the car to get ready for his ride in 2003. His final race of the season came at Homestead for Michael Waltrip Racing, driving the No. 00 Bacardi Chevrolet.

In 2004, Skinner returned to the Truck Series to become one of Toyota's main drivers following their entrance of the Tundra in the truck series. Skinner drove the No. 42 Toyota Tundra for Bang! Racing for the first 18 races. He was running ninth in points when conflicts between Toyota and Bang's owners allowed the team to split and run the No. 5 Toyota Tundra for Bill Davis Racing. He won two poles and had two top-tens in his six races for Bill Davis Racing while finishing eleventh in the final points. On the Cup side of things, Skinner returned to Childress to run the 33 Bass Pro Shops Chevy in the Daytona 500. He finished in 22nd, one lap down from winner Dale Earnhardt Jr.

In 2005, Skinner again drove the No. 5 Toyota Tundra for Bill Davis Racing. He collected seven poles and two Truck Series wins and finished fifth in points. He also ran a part-time Nextel Cup schedule, first announcing six races for Davis in the No. 23 car with sponsorship from Argent Mortgage, Bad Boy Mowers, and The History Channel, he qualified in five of the six races, as the other race he failed to qualify due to rain and being too low in Owner-Points. Skinner also raced in four races for R&J Motorsports in the No. 37 car for four races, with a best finish of 37th after some horrendous luck. He also attempted the 00 Aaron's Dream Machine for Michael Waltrip again but was collected in the Big One on lap nineteen. In 2006, Skinner again drove for Bill Davis Racing in the Truck Series. He collected eight poles and won one race while finishing tenth in points. He also ran four Cup races and nine Busch series races during the year. He also failed to qualify for ten races that year as well.

In 2007, Skinner finished second in the Craftsman Truck series point standings while driving the No. 5 Toyota Tundra for Bill Davis Racing. Skinner had a dominating year, as he won twelve poles and five races. He went into the last race of the season with a 29 point lead over Ron Hornaday Jr before having multiple tire issues and finishing in 35th place, losing the championship to Hornaday by 54 points.

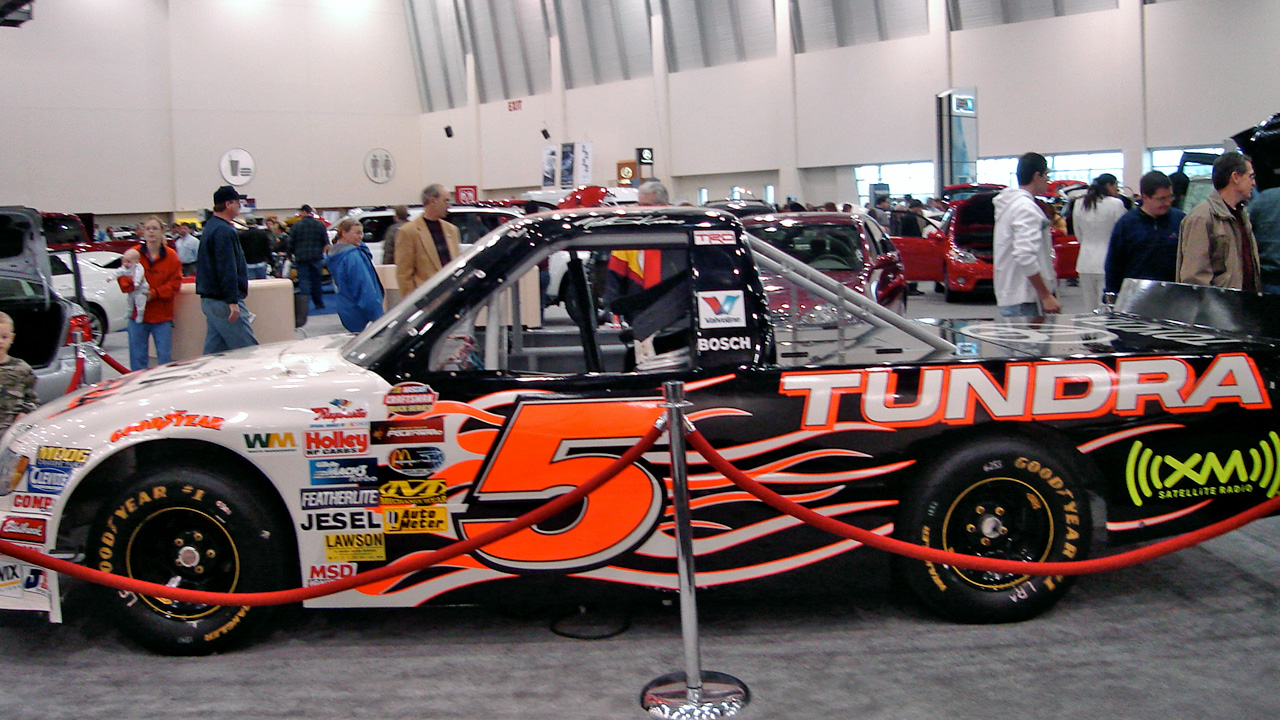
2006 truck

In 2008, Skinner collected four poles and won one race while finishing sixth in Truck Series points. He also ran in eleven Sprint Cup races for Toyota with one race for Bill Davis Racing, three races for Michael Waltrip Racing, and seven races for Team Red Bull. In 2009, Skinner was under contract to drive for Bill Davis Racing in the Truck Series, but the team was sold and ceased operations. On January 29, it was announced that Skinner would drive one of two trucks that Randy Moss Motorsports would field, the No. 5 Exide Batteries-sponsored Tundra. Skinner won three races and three poles and finished third in points. Skinner drove in five Cup Series races in 2009, three races in Tommy Baldwin Racing's No. 36 car that year and one race in the No. 70 Chevrolet Impala SS for TRG Motorsports.

The next season, however, would be quite different. Phillips left RMM after the 2009 season to be the crew chief for Kyle Busch Motorsports. Veteran Gene Nead initially replaced him, but Nead left the team after Charlotte, being replaced by team engineer Stacy Johnson. Their season would only go downhill from there, with Skinner grabbing only two top fives and an eight-place finish in the points. Skinner parted ways with RMM on January 19, 2011.

In 2011, Skinner attempted to qualify the No. 45 Toyota Tundra for Eddie Sharp Racing at Daytona, but failed to make the race on speed. Skinner was ineligible to use his past champion's provisional due to ESR entering the No. 45 after the entry deadline. He drove No. 60 Big Red Soda-sponsored Toyota Camry for Germain Racing in the Sprint Cup Series and also spent a few races driving the No. 32 Ford Fusion for FAS Lane Racing. He also drove for Tommy Baldwin Racing in Atlanta after medical issues forced Dave Blaney from the car.

In 2012, Skinner drove the No. 8 Eddie Sharp Racing Chevrolet in the season-opening Truck Series race at Daytona, but was involved in a crash with teammate Cale Gale and failed to finish the race. In early May, Skinner joined Hamilton Means Racing to drive the No. 52 in the Sprint Cup Series starting in the Southern 500 at Darlington Raceway. His last start was the 2012 August Michigan race. He has not raced ever since.

In 2016, Skinner starred as the test driver for the first series of the British motoring show The Grand Tour. On November 7, 2017, Skinner announced that he would not be returning for the second series of the show. He was later replaced by racing driver Abbie Eaton.

== Personal life ==
As revealed in a SiriusXM NASCAR Radio Interview with Dave Moody, Skinner was born Michael Quick. At the age of eight, his mother left his birth father and married a rancher by the name of William "Bill" Skinner, and Mike took his name after him. He was voted class president in the eighth grade. He then moved to Colorado in his late teens and worked on the oil derricks and was a manager. After getting his licence suspended in Colorado, he went back to California at the DMV to get his licence redone and then bought a 1971 Plymouth Road Runner. After crashing the car while street racing, he then ended up rebuying the car and converted it into a stock car and nearly won in his first ever race, only to showboat and crash the car, rolling several times and landing on his roof. Skinner was untouched until he kicked the car and broke his big toe.

Skinner has been married twice, first to his high school sweetheart and got married as an ultimatum but eventually divorced. In 2000, he married Angie Skinner, a co-host on SiriusXM Speedway. Together, the two host the "Skinner Roundup" on SiriusXM, held on Sunday afternoons where no Cup race is held.

Skinner has two sons from his previous marriage, Jamie and Dustin, who both appeared in NASCAR races.

== Motorsports career results ==
=== NASCAR ===
(key) (Bold – Pole position awarded by qualifying time. Italics – Pole position earned by points standings or practice time. * – Most laps led.)

==== Sprint Cup Series ====
NASCAR Sprint Cup Series results
Year	Team	No.	Make	1	2	3	4	5	6	7	8	9	10	11	12	13	14	15	16	17	18	19	20	21	22	23	24	25	26	27	28	29	30	31	32	33	34	35	36	NSCC	Pts	Ref
1986	Zanworth Racing Team	19	Pontiac	DAY	RCH	CAR	ATL	BRI	DAR	NWS	MAR; 22	TAL	DOV	CLT	RSD	POC	MCH	DAY	POC	TAL	GLN	MCH	BRI	DAR	RCH	DOV	MAR; 30	NWS	CLT	CAR; 23	ATL	RSD								61st	264	
1990	Mansion Motorsports	13	Chevy	DAY	RCH	CAR	ATL	DAR	BRI	NWS	MAR	TAL	CLT	DOV	SON	POC	MCH	DAY	POC	TAL	GLN	MCH	BRI	DAR	RCH	DOV	MAR	NWS	CLT; DNQ											96th	58	
1990	Mansion Motorsports	13	Buick																											CAR; 35	PHO	ATL								96th	58	
1991	Mansion Motorsports	13	Chevy	DAY	RCH	CAR; 32	ATL	DAR	BRI	NWS	MAR	TAL	CLT	DOV	SON	POC	MCH	DAY	POC	TAL	GLN	MCH	BRI	DAR	RCH	DOV	MAR	NWS	CLT; 40	CAR	PHO	ATL								64th	110	
1992	Mansion Motorsports	13	Chevy	DAY; DNQ	CAR; 23	RCH		DAR; DNQ	BRI	NWS	MAR	TAL																												59th	173	
1992	Mansion Motorsports	85	Chevy				ATL; DNQ						CLT; DNQ	DOV	SON	POC	MCH	DAY	POC; 41	TAL	GLN	MCH	BRI	DAR	RCH	DOV	MAR	NWS	CLT; DNQ	CAR; 28	PHO	ATL; DNQ								59th	173	
1993	Jimmy Means Racing	52	Ford	DAY	CAR	RCH	ATL	DAR	BRI	NWS	MAR	TAL	SON	CLT	DOV	POC	MCH	DAY	NHA	POC	TAL	GLN	MCH	BRI	DAR; 35	RCH	DOV	MAR	NWS	CLT	CAR	PHO	ATL							80th	58	
1994	Jimmy Means Racing	52	Ford	DAY	CAR; 31	RCH	ATL	DAR	BRI	NWS; DNQ	MAR; DNQ	TAL	SON	CLT	DOV	POC	MCH	DAY	NHA	POC	TAL	IND	GLN	MCH	BRI	DAR	RCH	DOV	MAR	NWS	CLT	CAR	PHO	ATL						72nd	70	
1996	Richard Childress Racing	31	Chevy	DAY	CAR; 12	RCH	ATL	DAR	BRI; 36	NWS	MAR	TAL; 17	SON	CLT	DOV	POC	MCH	DAY	NHA	POC	TAL							DOV; 19	MAR	NWS	CLT	CAR	PHO; 13	ATL						47th	529	
1996	Richard Childress Racing	3	Chevy																			IND; RL^{†}	GLN	MCH	BRI	DAR	RCH													47th	529	
1997	Richard Childress Racing	31	Chevy	**DAY**; 12	CAR; 25	RCH; 26	ATL; 21	DAR; 30	TEX; 22	BRI; 35	MAR; 32	SON; 16	TAL; 16	CLT; 34	DOV; 9	POC; 41	MCH; 42	CAL; 33	**DAY**; 41	NHA; 21	POC; 6	IND; 9	GLN; 19	MCH; 30	BRI; 34	DAR; 36	RCH; 29	NHA; 35	DOV; 19	MAR; 31	CLT; DNQ	TAL; 33	CAR; 23	PHO; 28	ATL; 23					30th	2669	
1998	Richard Childress Racing	31	Chevy	DAY; 8	CAR; 32	LVS; 29	ATL; 42	DAR; 28	BRI; 32	TEX; 33	MAR	TAL	CAL	CLT; 29	DOV; 27	RCH; 30	MCH; 29	POC; 29	SON; 17	NHA; 5	POC; 30	IND; 4	GLN; 3	MCH; 19	BRI; 7	NHA; 15	DAR; 26	RCH; 8	DOV; 32	MAR; 16	CLT; 21	TAL; 7*	DAY; 3	PHO; 16	CAR; 21	ATL; 9				21st	3153	
1999	Richard Childress Racing	31	Chevy	DAY; 4	CAR; 6	LVS; 4	ATL; 6	DAR; 32	TEX; 42	BRI; 21	MAR; 4	TAL; 36	CAL; 10	RCH; 30	CLT; 9	DOV; 19	MCH; 18	POC; 22	SON; 17	DAY; 4	NHA; 23	**POC**; 10*	IND; 12	GLN; 9	MCH; 36	BRI; 23	DAR; 36	**RCH**; 11	NHA; 27	DOV; 21	MAR; 6*	CLT; 3	TAL; 13	CAR; 17	PHO; 20	HOM; 6	ATL; 8			10th	4003	
2000	Richard Childress Racing	31	Chevy	DAY; 16	CAR; 21	LVS; 27	ATL; 30*	DAR; 14	BRI; 13	TEX; 12	MAR; 19	TAL; 2	**CAL**; 7	RCH; 33	CLT; 7	DOV; 9	MCH; 20	POC; 9	SON; 20	DAY; 9	NHA; 39	POC; 7	IND; 9	GLN; 36	MCH; 16	BRI; 14	DAR; 43	RCH; 30	NHA; 24	DOV; 11	MAR; 8	CLT; 20	TAL; 6	CAR; 14	PHO; 11	HOM; 23	ATL; 6			12th	3898	
2001	Richard Childress Racing	31	Chevy	DAY; 26	CAR; 24	LVS; 18	ATL; 9	DAR; 37	BRI; 18	TEX; 30	MAR; 32	TAL; 29	CAL; 32	RCH; 24	CLT; 11	DOV; 11	MCH; 20	POC; 12	SON; 34	DAY; 41	CHI; 42	NHA	POC	IND	GLN	MCH; 18	BRI; 34	DAR; 24	RCH; 33	DOV; 20	KAN	CLT	MAR	TAL	PHO	CAR	HOM	ATL	NHA	40th	2029	
2002	Morgan-McClure Motorsports	4	Chevy	DAY; 23	CAR; 36	LVS; 34	ATL; 28	DAR; 20	BRI; 23	TEX; 12	MAR; 25	TAL; 23	CAL; 31	RCH; 28	CLT; 24	DOV; 22	POC; 37	MCH; 30	SON; 12	DAY; 37	CHI; 23	NHA; 38	POC; 29	IND; 36	GLN; 40	MCH; 28	BRI; 29	DAR; 38	RCH; 22	NHA; 43	DOV; 19	KAN; 32	TAL; 28	CLT; 24	MAR; 33	ATL; 26	CAR; 6	PHO; 24	HOM; 36	31st	2886	
2003	Morgan-McClure Motorsports	4	Pontiac	DAY; 37	CAR; 17	LVS; 39	ATL; 30	DAR; 11	BRI; 41	TEX; 40	TAL; 31	MAR; 35	CAL; 20	RCH; 35	CLT; 20	DOV; 36	POC; 34	MCH; DNQ	SON	DAY	CHI	NHA	POC																	39th	1960	
2003	MB2 Motorsports	01	Pontiac																					IND; 35	GLN	MCH; 22	BRI; 18	DAR; 29	**RCH**; 18	NHA; 22	DOV; 41	TAL; 27	KAN; 29	CLT; 39	MAR; 21	ATL	PHO	CAR		39th	1960	
2003	Michael Waltrip Racing	00	Chevy																																				HOM; 39	39th	1960	
2004	Richard Childress Racing	33	Chevy	DAY; 22	CAR	LVS	ATL	DAR	BRI	TEX	MAR	TAL	CAL	RCH	CLT	DOV	POC	MCH	SON	DAY	CHI	NHA	POC	IND	GLN	MCH	BRI	CAL	RCH	NHA	DOV	TAL	KAN	CLT	MAR	ATL	PHO	DAR	HOM	77th	97	
2005	Bill Davis Racing	23	Dodge	DAY; 30	CAL	LVS	ATL	BRI	MAR	TEX	PHO	TAL; 42	DAR	RCH	CLT; 41	DOV; DNQ	POC	MCH; 34	SON	DAY	CHI	NHA	POC	IND; 29	GLN	MCH	BRI	CAL	RCH	NHA	DOV									49th	487	
2005	Front Row Motorsports	92	Chevy																													TAL; QL^{‡}								49th	487	
2005	Mach 1 Motorsports	00	Ford																													TAL; 43	KAN	CLT	MAR					49th	487	
2005	R&J Racing	37	Dodge																																	ATL; 43	TEX; 43	PHO; 37	HOM; 39	49th	487	
2006	Bill Davis Racing	23	Dodge	DAY; DNQ	CAL																																			57th	184	
2006	R&J Racing	37	Dodge			LVS; DNQ	ATL; DNQ	BRI; DNQ	MAR	TEX	PHO	TAL	RCH	DAR	CLT	DOV	POC							IND; 37	GLN		BRI; DNQ	CAL	RCH	NHA	DOV	KAN	TAL							57th	184	
2006	Front Row Motorsports	34	Chevy															MCH; 37	SON	DAY	CHI	NHA	POC			MCH; DNQ														57th	184	
2006	CJM Racing	72	Chevy																															CLT; 43	MAR; 39	ATL; DNQ	TEX; DNQ	PHO		57th	184	
2006	Kirk Shelmerdine Racing	27	Chevy																																				HOM; DNQ	57th	184	
2007	Bill Davis Racing	23	Toyota	DAY; DNQ	CAL	LVS	ATL	BRI	MAR	TEX	PHO	TAL	RCH	DAR	CLT	DOV	POC	MCH	SON	NHA	DAY	CHI	IND	POC	GLN	MCH	BRI	CAL	RCH	NHA	DOV	KAN	TAL	CLT	MAR					65th	91	
2007	Bill Davis Racing	36	Toyota																																	ATL; DNQ	TEX; 24	PHO	HOM	65th	91	
2008	Bill Davis Racing	27	Toyota	DAY	CAL; DNQ	LVS; 30																																		48th	734	
2008	Team Red Bull	84	Toyota				ATL; 27	BRI; 40	MAR; 31	TEX; 29	PHO; 28	TAL	RCH	DAR	CLT	DOV	POC	MCH	SON	NHA	DAY	CHI	IND	POC	GLN								TAL; 31	CLT; 39	MAR	ATL	TEX	PHO	HOM	48th	734	
2008	Michael Waltrip Racing	00	Toyota																							MCH; 35	BRI; 28	CAL; 35	RCH	NHA	DOV	KAN								48th	734	
2009	R3 Motorsports	23	Chevy	DAY; DNQ	CAL	LVS	ATL	BRI	MAR	TEX	PHO	TAL	RCH	DAR	CLT																									55th	200	
2009	Tommy Baldwin Racing	36	Toyota													DOV; 41	POC	MCH; DNQ	SON	NHA	DAY	CHI; 39	IND; 41	POC	GLN	MCH; 41	BRI; DNQ	ATL	RCH	NHA	DOV	KAN	CAL	CLT	MAR	TAL				55th	200	
2009	TRG Motorsports	70	Chevy																																		TEX; 43	PHO	HOM; DNQ	55th	200	
2011	FAS Lane Racing	32	Ford	DAY	PHO; 24	LVS; 29	BRI	CAL																																59th	0^{1}	
2011	Germain Racing	60	Toyota						MAR; 42	TEX; 43	TAL; DNQ	RCH; 41	DAR; 40	DOV; 41	CLT; 43	KAN; 40	POC; DNQ	MCH; DNQ	SON; 42	DAY; 40	KEN; 43	NHA; 42	IND; 40	POC; DNQ	GLN; 43	MCH; 42	BRI; 41					DOV; DNQ	KAN; DNQ	CLT	TAL					59th	0^{1}	
2011	Tommy Baldwin Racing	36	Chevy																									ATL; 27												59th	0^{1}	
2011	Germain Racing	60	Chevy																										RCH; DNQ	CHI; DNQ	NHA									59th	0^{1}	
2011	Max Q Motorsports	37	Ford																																	MAR; 43	TEX; 41	PHO; 42	HOM; DNQ	59th	0^{1}	
2012	Hamilton Means Racing	52	Toyota	DAY	PHO	LVS	BRI	CAL	MAR	TEX	KAN	RCH	TAL	DAR; 41	CLT	DOV	POC	MCH	SON	KEN; DNQ	DAY	NHA																		53rd	10	
2012	Go Green Racing	79	Ford																				IND; 42																	53rd	10	
2012	Phil Parsons Racing	98	Ford																					POC; 41	GLN	MCH; 39	BRI	ATL	RCH	CHI	NHA	DOV	TAL	CLT	KAN	MAR	TEX	PHO	HOM	53rd	10	
^{†} - Relieved Dale Earnhardt ^{‡} – Qualified but replaced by Bobby Hamilton Jr.

===== Daytona 500 =====
Year	Team	Manufacturer	Start	Finish
1992	Mansion Motorsports	Chevrolet	DNQ	
1997	Richard Childress Racing	Chevrolet	**1**	12
1998	Richard Childress Racing	Chevrolet	8	8
1999	Richard Childress Racing	Chevrolet	12	4
2000	Richard Childress Racing	Chevrolet	4	16
2001	Richard Childress Racing	Chevrolet	4	26
2002	Morgan-McClure Motorsports	Chevrolet	20	23
2003	Morgan-McClure Motorsports	Pontiac	43	37
2004	Richard Childress Racing	Chevrolet	43	22
2005	Bill Davis Racing	Dodge	7	30
2006	Bill Davis Racing	Dodge	DNQ	
2007	Bill Davis Racing	Toyota	DNQ	
2009	R3 Motorsports	Chevrolet	DNQ	

==== Busch Series ====
NASCAR Busch Series results
Year	Team	No.	Make	1	2	3	4	5	6	7	8	9	10	11	12	13	14	15	16	17	18	19	20	21	22	23	24	25	26	27	28	29	30	31	32	33	34	35	NBGNC	Pts	Ref
1987		0	Olds	DAY	HCY	MAR	DAR; 27	BRI	LGY	SBO	CLT	DOV	IRP	ROU	JFC	OXF	SBO	HCY	RAL	LGY	ROU	BRI	JFC	DAR	RCH	DOV	MAR	CLT	CAR	MAR									66th	82	
1992	Barry Owen Racing	91	Olds	DAY	CAR	RCH	ATL	MAR	DAR	BRI	HCY	LAN	DUB	NZH	CLT	DOV	ROU	MYB	GLN	VOL	NHA	TAL	IRP	ROU	MCH	NHA	BRI	DAR	RCH	DOV	CLT; 28	MAR	CAR	HCY					119th	79	
1994	Gene Petty Motorsports	88	Chevy	DAY	CAR	RCH	ATL	MAR	DAR	HCY	BRI	ROU; 29	NHA	NZH	**CLT**; 28	DOV	MYB; DNQ	GLN	MLW	SBO; DNQ	TAL	HCY; 26	IRP; 28	MCH	BRI; 29	DAR	RCH	DOV	CLT	MAR	CAR								57th	395	
1997	Wellrich Motorsports	7	Chevy	DAY	CAR	RCH	ATL	LVS	DAR	HCY	TEX	BRI	NSV	TAL	NHA	NZH	CLT	DOV	SBO	GLN	MLW	MYB	GTY	IRP	MCH	BRI	DAR	RCH	DOV	CLT; DNQ	CAL	CAR	HOM						NA	-	
1999	Team Yellow Racing	19	Chevy	DAY	CAR; DNQ	LVS; 24	ATL; 1*	DAR; 36	TEX; 9	NSV	BRI	TAL	CAL; 37	NHA	RCH	NZH	CLT; 29	DOV	SBO	GLN	MLW	MYB	PPR	GTY	IRP	MCH; 37	BRI	DAR; 36	RCH; 18	DOV; 31	CLT; 10	CAR	MEM	PHO; 33	HOM; 18				44th	1195	
2000	Team Yellow Racing	19	Chevy	DAY; 43	CAR; DNQ	LVS; DNQ	ATL; 32	DAR	BRI	TEX	NSV	TAL																											52nd	833	
2000	Andy Petree Racing	15	Chevy										CAL; 6	RCH	NHA	CLT; 15	DOV; 14	SBO	MYB	GLN	MLW	NZH	PPR	GTY	IRP	MCH	BRI	DAR	RCH	**DOV**; 35	CLT; 16	CAR	MEM	PHO; 3	HOM				52nd	833	
2001	Richard Childress Racing	21	Chevy	DAY	CAR	LVS	ATL	DAR	BRI	TEX; 9	NSH; 6	TAL; 5	CAL; 23	RCH; 3	NHA; 3	NZH	CLT; 5	DOV; 4	KEN	MLW; 11	GLN	CHI; 2	GTY	PPR	IRP	MCH; 6	**BRI**; 11	DAR; 24	RCH	DOV; 19	KAN	CLT	MEM	PHO	CAR	HOM			27th	1999	
2003	Evans Motorsports	7	Chevy	DAY	CAR	LVS	DAR	BRI	TEX	TAL	NSH	CAL	RCH	GTY	NZH	CLT	DOV	NSH	KEN	MLW	DAY	CHI	NHA	PPR	IRP; 7	MCH	BRI	DAR	RCH	DOV	KAN	CLT	MEM	ATL	PHO	CAR	HOM		106th	146	
2006	FitzBradshaw Racing	12	Dodge	DAY	CAL	MXC	LVS	ATL	BRI	TEX	NSH	PHO	TAL	RCH	DAR	CLT	DOV; 25	NSH; 26	KEN	MLW	DAY	CHI	NHA	MAR	GTY	IRP; 18	GLN	MCH; 29	BRI; 13	CAL	RCH; 32	DOV	KAN	CLT; 10	MEM	TEX; 21	PHO; DNQ	HOM; 24	46th	874	

==== Camping World Truck Series ====
NASCAR Camping World Truck Series results
Year	Team	No.	Make	1	2	3	4	5	6	7	8	9	10	11	12	13	14	15	16	17	18	19	20	21	22	23	24	25	26	27	NCWTC	Pts	Ref
1995	Richard Childress Racing	3	Chevy	PHO; 1*	**TUS**; 27	**SGS**; 5*	**MMR**; 4	**POR**; 1*	**EVG**; 4	I70; 1*	**LVL**; 1*	**BRI**; 20	**MLW**; 1*	CNS; 2	HPT; 5	**IRP**; 1*	FLM; 3	RCH; 3	MAR; 2*	**NWS**; 10	SON; 3	MMR; 1	PHO; 1*								1st	3224	
1996	Richard Childress Racing	3	Chevy	HOM; 20*	**PHO**; 2	POR; 3	EVG; 5	TUS; 1	CNS; 1*	HPT; 1*	**BRI**; 4*	NZH; 14	MLW; 7	LVL; 2	I70; 2	**IRP**; 1*	FLM; 1*	GLN; 3	NSV; 16*	RCH; 1*	**NHA**; 27	MAR; 1	NWS; 9*	**SON**; 3	MMR; 1	PHO; 4	LVS; 7				3rd	3771	
1997	Great Dane Racing	93	Chevy	WDW	TUS	HOM; 4	PHO	POR	EVG	I70	NHA	TEX	BRI	NZH	MLW	LVL	CNS	HPT; 5	IRP; 32	FLM	NSV	GLN	RCH	MAR	SON	MMR	CAL	PHO	LVS; 36		47th	437	
1998	Mike Skinner Racing	5	Chevy	WDW; 19	HOM	PHO	POR	EVG	I70	GLN	TEX	BRI	MLW	NZH	CAL; 5	PPR	IRP	NHA	FLM	NSV	HPT	LVL	RCH	MEM	GTY	MAR	SON	MMR	PHO	LVS	55th	261	
2003	Billy Ballew Motorsports	15	Ford	DAY	DAR	MMR	MAR	CLT	DOV	TEX	MEM	MLW	KAN	KEN; 13																	48th	471	
2003	Billy Ballew Motorsports	15	Dodge												GTW; 12	MCH; 15	IRP; 22	NSH	BRI	RCH	NHA	CAL	LVS	SBO	TEX	MAR	PHO	HOM			48th	471	
2004	Bang! Racing	42	Toyota	DAY; 28	ATL; 2*	MAR; 5	MFD; 11	CLT; 15	DOV; 4*	TEX; 11	MEM; 26	MLW; 29	KAN; 12	KEN; 18	GTW; 28	MCH; 3	IRP; 13	NSH; 10	BRI; 23*												11th	3037	
2004	Bill Davis Racing	42	Toyota																	RCH; 10	NHA; 10										11th	3037	
2004	Bill Davis Racing	5	Toyota																			**LVS**; 6	CAL; 33	**TEX**; 11	MAR; 33	PHO; 17	DAR; 23	HOM; 6			11th	3037	
2005	Bill Davis Racing	5	Toyota	DAY; 25	**CAL**; 18	ATL; 34	MAR; 9	GTY; 4	MFD; 28	**CLT**; 26	DOV; 10	**TEX**; 4*	MCH; 5	MLW; 16	KAN; 4	KEN; 4	MEM; 29	IRP; 19	**NSH**; 4*	BRI; 1*	RCH; 1*	NHA; 24	**LVS**; 6	MAR; 33	**ATL**; 12	**TEX**; 2*	PHO; 9	HOM; 12			5th	3273	
2006	Bill Davis Racing	5	Toyota	DAY; 4	CAL; 17	ATL; 35	MAR; 8	GTY; 35	**CLT**; 31	MFD; 29	DOV; 22	**TEX**; 2*	**MCH**; 11	MLW; 11	**KAN**; 5*	KEN; 31	MEM; 9	IRP; 18	NSH; 17*	BRI; 7	**NHA**; 2	**LVS**; 1*	TAL; 2	MAR; 7	**ATL**; 8	TEX; 3	PHO; 3	**HOM**; 35			10th	3219	
2007	Bill Davis Racing	5	Toyota	DAY; 4	CAL; 1	**ATL**; 1*	**MAR**; 1*	**KAN**; 5	**CLT**; 8	**MFD**; 4	**DOV**; 7	TEX; 2	MCH; 4	**MLW**; 4*	MEM; 4	KEN; 1*	IRP; 20	**NSH**; 3*	BRI; 4	**GTW**; 28	NHA; 3	LVS; 13	TAL; 13	MAR; 1	ATL; 5	**TEX**; 3*	**PHO**; 8	HOM; 35			2nd	3928	
2008	Bill Davis Racing	5	Toyota	DAY; 29	CAL; 8	ATL; 3	MAR; 29	KAN; 5	CLT; 10	MFD; 5	**DOV**; 7	TEX; 9	**MCH**; 8	MLW; 10	MEM; 7	**KEN**; 7	IRP; 10	NSH; 17	BRI; 7	GTW; 7	NHA; 15	LVS; 1	TAL; 9	MAR; 12	ATL; 26	TEX; 8	PHO; 5	**HOM**; 26			6th	3363	
2009	Randy Moss Motorsports	5	Toyota	DAY; 7	CAL; 11	ATL; 4	MAR; 3	KAN; 1*	CLT; 29	DOV; 8	TEX; 10	MCH; 5	MLW; 19	MEM; 6	KEN; 2	IRP; 2	NSH; 14	BRI; 20	CHI; 13	**IOW**; 1*	GTW; 1	**NHA**; 8	LVS; 7	**MAR**; 23	TAL; 19	TEX; 8	PHO; 6	HOM; 6			3rd	3602	
2010	Randy Moss Motorsports	5	Toyota	DAY; 24	ATL; 14	MAR; 27	NSH; 7	KAN; 8	DOV; 8	CLT; 6	TEX; 4	MCH; 12	IOW; 7	GTY; 10	IRP; 15	POC; 6	NSH; 11	DAR; 22	BRI; 4	CHI; 23	KEN; 13	NHA; 13	LVS; 24	MAR; 6	TAL; 15	TEX; 8	PHO; 6	HOM; 8			8th	3256	
2011	Eddie Sharp Racing	45	Toyota	DAY; DNQ	PHO; 24	DAR	MAR	NSH	DOV	CLT	KAN	TEX	KEN	IOW	NSH	IRP	POC	MCH	BRI	ATL	CHI	NHA	KEN	LVS	TAL	MAR	TEX	HOM			67th	20	
2012	Eddie Sharp Racing	8	Chevy	DAY; 33	MAR	CAR	KAN	CLT	DOV	TEX	KEN	IOW	CHI	POC	MCH	BRI	ATL	IOW	KEN	LVS	TAL	MAR	TEX	PHO	HOM						121st	0^{1}	

^{1} Ineligible for series points

=== ARCA Bondo/Mar-Hyde Series ===
(key) (Bold – Pole position awarded by qualifying time. Italics – Pole position earned by points standings or practice time. * – Most laps led.)

ARCA Bondo/Mar-Hyde Series results
Year	Team	No.	Make	1	2	3	4	5	6	7	8	9	10	11	12	13	14	15	16	17	18	19	20	21	22	23	24	25	ABSC	Pts	Ref
1990	Mansion Motorsports	13	Chevy	DAY	ATL	KIL	TAL	FRS	POC	KIL	TOL	HAG	POC	TAL	MCH	ISF	TOL	DSF	WIN	DEL	ATL; 27								120th	-	
1992	Mansion Motorsports	5	Chevy	DAY	FIF	TWS	TAL	TOL	KIL	POC	MCH	FRS	KIL	NSH	DEL	POC; 26	HPT	FRS	ISF	TOL	DSF	TWS	SLM						100th	-	
1992	Mansion Motorsports	85	Chevy																					ATL; 37					100th	-	
1995	Richard Childress Racing	31	Chevy	DAY	ATL	TAL	FIF	KIL	FRS	MCH	I80	MCS	FRS	POC	POC	KIL	FRS	SBS	LVL	ISF	DSF	SLM	WIN	**ATL**; 6*					125th	-	
1996	Richard Childress Racing	3	Chevy	**DAY**; 3*	ATL	SLM	TAL	FIF	LVL	CLT	CLT	KIL	FRS	POC	MCH	FRS	TOL	POC	MCH	INF	SBS	ISF	DSF	KIL	SLM	WIN	CLT	ATL	155th	-	

Sporting positions
Preceded by None	Camping World Truck Series Champion; 1995	Succeeded by Ron Hornaday Jr.
Achievements
Preceded by Johnny Benson Jr.	NASCAR Sprint Cup Series Rookie of the Year; 1997	Succeeded by Kenny Irwin Jr.
