= Dustin Skinner =

American racing driver

- Born: April 20, 1985 (age 41); Greensboro, North Carolina, U.S.

NASCAR FedEx Freight Truck Series career
- 1 race run over 1 year
- 2008 position: 119th
- First race: 2008 Kroger 200 (Martinsville)
Wins	Top tens	Poles
0	0	0
- Statistics up to date as of September 9, 2019.

Dustin William Skinner (born April 20, 1985) is an American former stock car racing driver. He has competed in one NASCAR Craftsman Truck Series race, in 2008 at Martinsville Speedway. He is the son of Mike Skinner.

== Racing career ==
Skinner started his racing career in 1998, driving go-karts. He later moved on to Fast Trucks at various Florida racetracks, and ran Daytona International Speedway as a part of the IPOWER Dash series in 2004. He tested a NASCAR Craftsman Truck at New Smyrna Speedway in October 2007. In October 2008, Skinner made his only NASCAR Craftsman Truck Series start at Martinsville Speedway, starting 31st and finishing 34th after an early-race incident in turn three derailed his efforts. The start came with Germain Racing, an affiliate of Toyota Racing Development, whom Skinner had also worked with in late model racing. The start with Germain came after a driver development program with Key Motorsports did not come to fruition; in March 2008 the team announced that they were looking to field Skinner in up to six Truck races that year, dependent on sponsorship.

After his driving career finished, Skinner transitioned into a mechanic role, working in Florida to prepare racecars in that state. He also helps, along with brother Jamie Skinner, on father Mike Skinner's late model efforts.

In 2020, Skinner came under fire for racist comments made regarding Bubba Wallace, the only Black full-time Cup Series driver in NASCAR, after a noose was found in Wallace's garage stall at Talladega Superspeedway. Skinner stated, "Frankly I wish they would've tied [the noose] to [Wallace] and drug him around the pits because he has single handedly destroyed what I grew up watching and cared about for 30 years now." Skinner later backtracked his statement, saying, "I disagree with what [Wallace] is doing, but it was stupidly foolish for me to say what I said and I truly regret every bit of it. If there was a way to take last night back I would. All I can do is say I'm sorry."

== Motorsports career results ==
=== NASCAR ===
(key) (Bold – Pole position awarded by qualifying time. Italics – Pole position earned by points standings or practice time. * – Most laps led.)

==== Craftsman Truck Series ====
NASCAR Craftsman Truck Series results
Year	Team	No.	Make	1	2	3	4	5	6	7	8	9	10	11	12	13	14	15	16	17	18	19	20	21	22	23	24	25	NCTC	Pts	Ref
2008	Germain Racing	03	Toyota	DAY	CAL	ATL	MAR	KAN	CLT	MFD	DOV	TEX	MCH	MLW	MEM	KEN	IRP	NSH	BRI	GTW	NHA	LVS	TAL	MAR; 34	ATL	TEX	PHO	HOM	119th	N/A	
