= Jamie Skinner =

American racing driver

- Born: Michael James Skinner; November 22, 1977 (age 48); Randleman, North Carolina, U.S.
- Achievements: 2020 World Series of Asphalt Pro Late Model winner

NASCAR O'Reilly Auto Parts Series career
- 4 races run over 2 years
- Best finish: 86th (1999)
- First race: 1999 Busch 200 (Loudon)
- Last race: 2000 Cheez-It 250 (Bristol)
Wins	Top tens	Poles
0	0	0

NASCAR FedEx Freight Truck Series career
- 2 races run over 2 years
- Best finish: 86th (1998)
- First race: 1997 Hanes 250 (Martinsville)
- Last race: 1998 Loadhandler 200 (Bristol)
Wins	Top tens	Poles
0	0	0

Michael James Skinner (born November 22, 1977) is an American professional stock car racing driver. He is the son of former NASCAR driver Mike Skinner, and brother of Dustin Skinner.

He currently races Pro Late Models at tracks such as New Smyrna Speedway, where he won the class championship at the 2020 World Series of Asphalt. Skinner, his father, and brother Dustin oversee the Racecar Solutions late model team and driver development program.

Skinner was arrested on November 2, 2000, on multiple drug charges, including trafficking in cocaine by possession. He was arrested a second time on February 3, 2001, for possession of Ketamine.

== Motorsports career results ==
=== NASCAR ===
(key) (Bold – Pole position awarded by qualifying time. Italics – Pole position earned by points standings or practice time. * – Most laps led.)

==== Busch Series ====
NASCAR Busch Series results
Year	Team	No.	Make	1	2	3	4	5	6	7	8	9	10	11	12	13	14	15	16	17	18	19	20	21	22	23	24	25	26	27	28	29	30	31	32	NBSC	Pts	Ref
1999	Ridling Motorsports	19	Chevy	DAY	CAR	LVS	ATL	DAR	TEX	NSV	BRI	TAL	CAL	NHA; 33	RCH	NZH	CLT	DOV	SBO	GLN	MLW	MYB	PPR	GTY	IRP	MCH	BRI; 29	DAR	RCH	DOV	CLT	CAR	MEM; 43	PHO	HOM	86th	174	
2000	Ridling Motorsports	19	Chevy	DAY	CAR	LVS	ATL	DAR	BRI; 41	TEX	NSV	TAL	CAL	RCH	NHA	CLT	DOV	SBO	MYB	GLN	MLW	NZH	PPR	GTY	IRP	MCH	BRI	DAR	RCH	DOV	CLT	CAR	MEM	PHO	HOM	115th	40	

==== Craftsman Truck Series ====
NASCAR Craftsman Truck Series results
Year	Team	No.	Make	1	2	3	4	5	6	7	8	9	10	11	12	13	14	15	16	17	18	19	20	21	22	23	24	25	26	27	NCTC	Pts	Ref
1997	Dorman Racing	93	Chevy	WDW	TUS	HOM	PHO	POR	EVG	I70	NHA	TEX	BRI	NZH	MLW	LVL	CNS	HPT	IRP	FLM	NSV	GLN	RCH	MAR; 30	SON	MMR	CAL	PHO	LVS		122nd	73	
1998	Mike Skinner Racing	5	Chevy	WDW	HOM; DNQ	PHO	POR	EVG	I70	GLN	TEX	BRI; 26	MLW	NZH	CAL	PPR	IRP	NHA	FLM	NSV	HPT	LVL	RCH	MEM	GTY	MAR	SON	MMR	PHO	LVS	86th	119	
