= 2009 Southern 500 presented by GoDaddy.com =

Race details
- Race 11 of 36 in the 2009 NASCAR Sprint Cup Series
- Layout of Darlington Raceway
- Date: May 9, 2009
- Location: Darlington Raceway, Darlington County, South Carolina
- Course: Permanent racing facility
- Course length: 1.366 miles (2.198 km)
- Distance: 367 laps, 501.322 mi (806.799 km)
- Weather: Chilly with temperatures plummeting as low as 69.1 °F (20.6 °C); wind speeds up to 16.9 miles per hour (27.2 km/h)
- Average speed: 119.687 miles per hour (192.618 km/h)
- Attendance: 70,000

Pole position
Driver	Matt Kenseth	Roush Fenway Racing
- Time: 27.394

Most laps led
Driver	Greg Biffle	Roush Fenway Racing
- Laps: 117

Winner
No. 5	Mark Martin	Hendrick Motorsports

Television in the United States
- Network: Fox Broadcasting Company
- Announcers: Mike Joy, Darrell Waltrip and Larry McReynolds

The 2009 Southern 500 presented by GoDaddy.com, the 60th running of the race, was the eleventh race of the NASCAR Sprint Cup season, was held on Saturday, May 9, 2009 at Darlington Speedway in Darlington, South Carolina.

The race was televised in the USA on Fox starting at 7 PM US EDT with radio being handled on MRN on terrestrial radio and Sirius Satellite Radio.

Seventy-two thousand fans were eyewitnesses to four hours and eleven minutes of racing action. There were 23 changes to the lead position recorded during the race and 17 cautions were taken for a duration of 73 laps. Almost 20% of the race was held under the caution flag due to debris and accidents while the average green flag run was slightly more than 16 laps.

Top Ten Finishers
Pos.	Car #	Driver	Make	Team
1	5	Mark Martin	Chevrolet	Hendrick Motorsports
2	48	Jimmie Johnson	Chevrolet	Hendrick Motorsports
3	14	Tony Stewart	Chevrolet	Stewart–Haas Racing
4	39	Ryan Newman	Chevrolet	Stewart–Haas Racing
5	24	Jeff Gordon	Chevrolet	Hendrick Motorsports
6	1	Martin Truex Jr.	Chevrolet	Earnhardt Ganassi Racing
7	25	Brad Keselowski	Chevrolet	Hendrick Motorsports
8	16	Greg Biffle	Ford	Roush Fenway Racing
9	20	Joey Logano	Toyota	Joe Gibbs Racing
10	17	Matt Kenseth	Ford	Roush Fenway Racing

- Failed to Qualify: Jeremy Mayfield (#41), Scott Speed (#82)
- Note: Scott Speed's team paid Joe Nemechek to let Speed drive his car in this race.

Previous race: 2009 Crown Royal 400	Sprint Cup Series; 2009 season	Next race: 2009 Coca-Cola 600
