= 2009 Crown Royal Presents the Russ Friedman 400 =

2009 Crown Royal Presents The Russ Friedman 400
Race details
- Race 10 of 36 in the 2009 NASCAR Sprint Cup Series season
- 2009 Crown Royal presents the Russ Friedman 400 program cover
- Date: May 2, 2009
- Location: Richmond International Raceway, Richmond, Virginia
- Course: Permanent racing facility
- Course length: 0.75 miles (1.207 km)
- Distance: 400 laps, 300 mi (482.803 km)
- Weather: Temperatures averaging around 71.5 °F (21.9 °C); wind speeds up to 12 miles per hour (19 km/h)
- Average speed: 90.627 miles per hour (145.850 km/h)

Pole position
Driver	Brian Vickers	Red Bull Racing Team
- Time: 21.238

Most laps led
Driver	Denny Hamlin	Joe Gibbs Racing
- Laps: 148

Winner
No. 18	Kyle Busch	Joe Gibbs Racing

Television in the United States
- Network: Fox Broadcasting Company
- Announcers: Mike Joy, Darrell Waltrip and Larry McReynolds

The 2009 Crown Royal presents the Russ Friedman 400 was the tenth race in the 2009 NASCAR Sprint Cup Series, which took place on May 2, 2009 at the Richmond International Raceway in Richmond, Virginia.

== Entry list ==
No.	Driver	Make	Owner
00	David Reutimann	Toyota	Michael Waltrip
1	Martin Truex Jr.	Chevrolet	Teresa Earnhardt
2	Kurt Busch	Dodge	Walter Czarnecki
5	Mark Martin	Chevrolet	Mary Hendrick
06	Trevor Boys	Dodge	Theresa Boys
6	David Ragan	Ford	Mike Dee
07	Casey Mears	Chevrolet	Richard Childress
7	Robby Gordon	Toyota	Robby Gordon
09	Mike Bliss	Dodge	James Finch
9	Kasey Kahne	Dodge	George Gillett Jr.
11	Denny Hamlin	Toyota	J.D. Gibbs
12	David Stremme	Dodge	Roger Penske
14	Tony Stewart	Chevrolet	Margaret Haas
16	Greg Biffle	Ford	Jack Roush
17	Matt Kenseth	Ford	John Henry
18	Kyle Busch	Toyota	Joe Gibbs
19	Elliott Sadler	Dodge	George Gillett Jr.
20	Joey Logano	Toyota	Joe Gibbs
24	Jeff Gordon	Chevrolet	Rick Hendrick
26	Jamie McMurray	Ford	Geoff Smith
29	Kevin Harvick	Chevrolet	Richard Childress
31	Jeff Burton	Chevrolet	Richard Childress
33	Clint Bowyer	Chevrolet	Bobby Ginn III
34	John Andretti	Chevrolet	Teresa Earnhardt
36	Scott Riggs	Toyota	Tommy Baldwin
37	Tony Raines	Chevrolet	Brad Jenkins
39	Ryan Newman	Chevrolet	Tony Stewart
41	Jeremy Mayfield	Toyota	Jeremy Mayfield
42	Juan Pablo Montoya	Chevrolet	Teresa Earnhardt
43	Reed Sorenson	Dodge	Richard Petty
44	A.J. Allmendinger	Dodge	George Gillett Jr.
47	Marcos Ambrose	Toyota	Rob Kauffman
48	Jimmie Johnson	Chevrolet	Jeff Gordon
55	Michael Waltrip	Toyota	Michael Waltrip
64	Todd Bodine	Toyota	Larry Gunselman
66	Dave Blaney	Toyota	Phil Parsons
71	David Gilliland	Chevrolet	Kevin Buckler
77	Sam Hornish Jr.	Dodge	Bill Davis
82	Scott Speed	Toyota	Dietrich Mateschitz
83	Brian Vickers	Toyota	Dietrich Mateschitz
87	Joe Nemechek	Toyota	Andrea Nemechek
88	Dale Earnhardt Jr.	Chevrolet	Rick Hendrick
96	Bobby Labonte	Ford	Jeffrey Moorad
98	Paul Menard	Ford	Max Jones
99	Carl Edwards	Ford	Jack Roush

== Qualifying ==
Pos	No.	Driver	Make	Speed	Time	Behind
1	83	Brian Vickers	Toyota	127.131	21.238	0.000
2	24	Jeff Gordon	Chevrolet	126.844	21.286	-0.048
3	11	Denny Hamlin	Toyota	126.665	21.316	-0.078
4	1	Martin Truex Jr.	Chevrolet	126.642	21.320	-0.082
5	31	Jeff Burton	Chevrolet	126.322	21.374	-0.136
6	9	Mike Bliss	Dodge	126.286	21.380	-0.142
7	5	Mark Martin	Chevrolet	126.257	21.385	-0.147
8	82	Scott Speed	Toyota	126.180	21.398	-0.160
9	00	David Reutimann	Toyota	126.133	21.406	-0.168
10	39	Ryan Newman	Chevrolet	125.945	21.438	-0.200
11	12	David Stremme	Dodge	125.927	21.441	-0.203
12	33	Clint Bowyer	Chevrolet	125.909	21.444	-0.206
13	20	Joey Logano	Toyota	125.892	21.447	-0.209
14	18	Kyle Busch	Toyota	125.798	21.463	-0.225
15	48	Jimmie Johnson	Chevrolet	125.786	21.465	-0.227
16	14	Tony Stewart	Chevrolet	125.751	21.471	-0.233
17	2	Kurt Busch	Dodge	125.716	21.477	-0.239
18	9	Kasey Kahne	Dodge	125.681	21.483	-0.245
19	29	Kevin Harvick	Chevrolet	125.681	21.483	-0.245
20	16	Greg Biffle	Ford	125.535	21.508	-0.270
21	47	Marcos Ambrose	Toyota	125.441	21.524	-0.286
22	6	David Ragan	Ford	125.424	21.527	-0.289
23	43	Reed Sorenson	Dodge	125.366	21.537	-0.299
24	87	Joe Nemechek	Toyota	125.197	21.566	-0.328
25	88	Dale Earnhardt Jr.	Chevrolet	125.023	21.596	-0.358
26	66	Dave Blaney	Toyota	124.908	21.616	-0.378
27	26	Jamie McMurray	Ford	124.792	21.636	-0.398
28	77	Sam Hornish Jr.	Dodge	124.763	21.641	-0.403
29	42	Juan Montoya	Chevrolet	124.700	21.652	-0.414
30	55	Michael Waltrip	Toyota	124.700	21.652	-0.414
31	44	AJ Allmendinger	Dodge	124.683	21.655	-0.417
32	19	Elliott Sadler	Dodge	124.654	21.660	-0.422
33	98	Paul Menard	Ford	124.585	21.672	-0.434
34	71	David Gilliland	Chevrolet	124.579	21.673	-0.435
35	17	Matt Kenseth	Ford	124.298	21.722	-0.484
36	7	Robby Gordon	Toyota	124.281	21.725	-0.487
37	99	Carl Edwards	Ford	124.149	21.748	-0.510
38	41	Jeremy Mayfield	Toyota	124.127	21.752	-0.514
39	36	Scott Riggs	Toyota	123.768	21.815	-0.577
40	96	Bobby Labonte	Ford	123.468	21.868	-0.630
41	07	Casey Mears	Chevrolet	123.265	21.904	-0.666
42	34	John Andretti	Chevrolet	122.917	21.966	-0.728
43	37	Tony Raines	Chevrolet	123.700	21.827	-0.589
Failed to qualify
44	64	Todd Bodine	Toyota	123.119	21.930	
45	06	Trevor Boys	Dodge	117.228	23.032	

== Race recap ==
Brian Vickers won his second pole position of the season. Kyle Busch won the 400 lap race in his Toyota on his 24th birthday, with Tony Stewart, Jeff Burton, and Ryan Newman following. In total, there were 15 caution flags during the course of the race. Busch also won the NASCAR Nationwide Series race the previous day. This would also be the final start for Jeremy Mayfield, as he was suspended by NASCAR soon after for failing the drug policy rule.

== Results ==
Finish	No.	Driver	Make	Team	Laps	Led	Status	Pts	Winnings
1	18	Kyle Busch	Toyota	Joe Gibbs Racing	400	53	running	190	257248
2	14	Tony Stewart	Chevy	Stewart–Haas Racing	400	0	running	170	172773
3	31	Jeff Burton	Chevy	Richard Childress Racing	400	0	running	165	177906
4	39	Ryan Newman	Chevy	Stewart–Haas Racing	400	45	running	165	142829
5	5	Mark Martin	Chevy	Hendrick Motorsports	400	0	running	155	112350
6	77	Sam Hornish, Jr.	Dodge	Penske Racing	400	0	running	150	121035
7	26	Jamie McMurray	Ford	Roush Fenway Racing	400	0	running	146	102425
8	24	Jeff Gordon	Chevy	Hendrick Motorsports	400	96	running	147	127001
9	07	Casey Mears	Chevy	Richard Childress Racing	400	0	running	138	97125
10	42	Juan Pablo Montoya	Chevy	Earnhardt Ganassi Racing	400	0	running	134	118448
11	47	Marcos Ambrose	Toyota	JTG Daugherty Racing	400	0	running	130	96798
12	2	Kurt Busch	Dodge	Penske Racing	400	8	running	132	93475
13	17	Matt Kenseth	Ford	Roush Fenway Racing	400	0	running	124	121390
14	11	Denny Hamlin	Toyota	Joe Gibbs Racing	400	148	running	131	101050
15	83	Brian Vickers	Toyota	Red Bull Racing	400	21	running	123	109498
16	7	Robby Gordon	Toyota	Robby Gordon Motorsports	400	0	running	115	95060
17	16	Greg Biffle	Ford	Roush Fenway Racing	400	0	running	112	90525
18	33	Clint Bowyer	Chevy	Richard Childress Racing	400	7	running	114	82100
19	20	Joey Logano	Toyota	Joe Gibbs Racing	400	0	running	106	119126
20	43	Reed Sorenson	Dodge	Richard Petty Motorsports	400	0	running	103	112851
21	44	A.J. Allmendinger	Dodge	Richard Petty Motorsports	400	0	running	100	73475
22	1	Martin Truex, Jr.	Chevy	Earnhardt Ganassi Racing	400	22	running	102	113815
23	6	David Ragan	Ford	Roush Fenway Racing	400	0	running	94	82225
24	55	Michael Waltrip	Toyota	Michael Waltrip Racing	400	0	running	91	80675
25	19	Elliott Sadler	Dodge	Richard Petty Motorsports	400	0	running	88	80925
26	99	Carl Edwards	Ford	Roush Fenway Racing	400	0	running	85	118056
27	88	Dale Earnhardt, Jr.	Chevy	Hendrick Motorsports	399	0	running	82	87050
28	00	David Reutimann	Toyota	Michael Waltrip Racing	399	0	running	79	94498
29	9	Kasey Kahne	Dodge	Richard Petty Motorsports	399	0	running	76	111248
30	98	Paul Menard	Ford	Yates Racing	398	0	running	73	102531
31	96	Bobby Labonte	Ford	Hall of Fame Racing	398	0	running	70	98629
32	34	John Andretti	Chevy	Front Row Motorsports	397	0	running	67	77350
33	82	Scott Speed	Toyota	Red Bull Racing	396	0	running	64	80298
34	29	Kevin Harvick	Chevy	Richard Childress Racing	394	0	running	61	106403
35	41	Jeremy Mayfield	Toyota	Mayfield Motorsports	371	0	running	58	67975
36	48	Jimmie Johnson	Chevy	Hendrick Motorsports	368	0	running	55	121976
37	09	Mike Bliss	Dodge	Phoenix Racing	368	0	running	52	67700
38	12	David Stremme	Dodge	Penske Racing	324	0	crash	49	100065
39	71	David Gilliland	Chevy	TRG Motorsports	92	0	electrical	46	67450
40	87	Joe Nemechek	Toyota	NEMCO Motorsports	90	0	brakes	43	67325
41	37	Tony Raines	Chevy	Front Row Motorsports	74	0	brakes	0	67175
42	36	Scott Riggs	Toyota	Tommy Baldwin Racing	54	0	electrical	37	67050
43	66	Dave Blaney	Toyota	Prism Motorsports	8	0	crash	34	67424

== Television coverage ==
The race was telecast on Fox/Speed starting at 7 PM US EDT, because of baseball with radio coverage on Sirius Satellite Radio and MRN beginning at 7:30 PM US EDT.

Previous race: 2009 Aaron's 499	Sprint Cup Series; 2009 season	Next race: 2009 Southern 500 presented by GoDaddy.com
