= 2017 Auto Club 400 =

Race details
- Race 5 of 36 in the 2017 Monster Energy NASCAR Cup Series
- Track map of the speedway at Auto Club Speedway AKA California Speedway
- Date: March 26, 2017
- Location: Auto Club Speedway in Fontana, California
- Course: Permanent racing facility
- Course length: 2 miles (3.219 km)
- Distance: 202 laps, 404 mi (650.175 km)
- Scheduled distance: 200 laps, 400 mi (643.738 km)
- Average speed: 136.359 miles per hour (219.449 km/h)

Pole position
Driver	Kyle Larson	Chip Ganassi Racing
- Time: 38.493

Most laps led
Driver	Kyle Larson	Chip Ganassi Racing
- Laps: 110

Winner
No. 42	Kyle Larson	Chip Ganassi Racing

Television in the United States
- Network: Fox
- Announcers: Mike Joy, Jeff Gordon and Darrell Waltrip
- Nielsen ratings: 2.9/6 (Overnight); 3.2/6 (Final); 5.2 million viewers

Radio in the United States
- Radio: MRN
- Booth announcers: Joe Moore, Jeff Striegle and Rusty Wallace
- Turn announcers: Dan Hubbard (1 & 2) and Kurt Becker (3 & 4)

The 2017 Auto Club 400 was a Monster Energy NASCAR Cup Series race that was held on March 26, 2017, at Auto Club Speedway in Fontana, California. Contested over 202 laps, extended from 200 laps due to overtime, on the 2-mile (3.2-kilometre) D-shaped oval, it was the fifth race of the 2017 Monster Energy NASCAR Cup Series season. The race was won by Kyle Larson of Chip Ganassi Racing for his second Cup Series victory, leading the most laps from pole position.

== Entry list ==
No.	Driver	Team	Manufacturer
1	Jamie McMurray	Chip Ganassi Racing	Chevrolet
2	Brad Keselowski	Team Penske	Ford
3	Austin Dillon	Richard Childress Racing	Chevrolet
4	Kevin Harvick	Stewart–Haas Racing	Ford
5	Kasey Kahne	Hendrick Motorsports	Chevrolet
6	Trevor Bayne	Roush Fenway Racing	Ford
10	Danica Patrick	Stewart–Haas Racing	Ford
11	Denny Hamlin	Joe Gibbs Racing	Toyota
13	Ty Dillon (R)	Germain Racing	Chevrolet
14	Clint Bowyer	Stewart–Haas Racing	Ford
15	Reed Sorenson	Premium Motorsports	Toyota
17	Ricky Stenhouse Jr.	Roush Fenway Racing	Ford
18	Kyle Busch	Joe Gibbs Racing	Toyota
19	Daniel Suárez (R)	Joe Gibbs Racing	Toyota
20	Matt Kenseth	Joe Gibbs Racing	Toyota
21	Ryan Blaney	Wood Brothers Racing	Ford
22	Joey Logano	Team Penske	Ford
23	Gray Gaulding (R)	BK Racing	Toyota
24	Chase Elliott	Hendrick Motorsports	Chevrolet
27	Paul Menard	Richard Childress Racing	Chevrolet
31	Ryan Newman	Richard Childress Racing	Chevrolet
32	Matt DiBenedetto	Go Fas Racing	Ford
33	Jeffrey Earnhardt	Circle Sport – The Motorsports Group	Chevrolet
34	Landon Cassill	Front Row Motorsports	Ford
37	Chris Buescher	JTG Daugherty Racing	Chevrolet
38	David Ragan	Front Row Motorsports	Ford
41	Kurt Busch	Stewart–Haas Racing	Ford
42	Kyle Larson	Chip Ganassi Racing	Chevrolet
43	Aric Almirola	Richard Petty Motorsports	Ford
47	A. J. Allmendinger	JTG Daugherty Racing	Chevrolet
48	Jimmie Johnson	Hendrick Motorsports	Chevrolet
51	Timmy Hill (i)	Rick Ware Racing	Chevrolet
55	Derrike Cope	Premium Motorsports	Chevrolet
72	Cole Whitt	Tri-Star Motorsports	Chevrolet
77	Erik Jones (R)	Furniture Row Racing	Toyota
78	Martin Truex Jr.	Furniture Row Racing	Toyota
83	Corey LaJoie (R)	BK Racing	Toyota
88	Dale Earnhardt Jr.	Hendrick Motorsports	Chevrolet
95	Michael McDowell	Leavine Family Racing	Chevrolet
Official entry list

== Practice ==
=== First practice ===
Kyle Larson was the fastest in the first practice session with a time of 38.081 seconds and a speed of 189.071 mph (304.280 km/h).

Pos	No.	Driver	Team	Manufacturer	Time	Speed
1	42	Kyle Larson	Chip Ganassi Racing	Chevrolet	38.081	189.071
2	11	Denny Hamlin	Joe Gibbs Racing	Toyota	38.204	188.462
3	4	Kevin Harvick	Stewart–Haas Racing	Ford	38.228	188.344
Official first practice results

=== Second practice ===
Erik Jones was the fastest in the second practice session with a time of 38.451 seconds and a speed of 187.251 mph (301.351 km/h).

Pos	No.	Driver	Team	Manufacturer	Time	Speed
1	77	Erik Jones (R)	Furniture Row Racing	Toyota	38.451	187.251
2	24	Chase Elliott	Hendrick Motorsports	Chevrolet	38.535	186.843
3	31	Ryan Newman	Richard Childress Racing	Chevrolet	38.558	186.732
Official second practice results

=== Final practice ===
Chase Elliott was the fastest in the final practice session with a time of 38.404 seconds and a speed of 187.480 mph (301.720 km/h).

Pos	No.	Driver	Team	Manufacturer	Time	Speed
1	24	Chase Elliott	Hendrick Motorsports	Chevrolet	38.404	187.480
2	78	Martin Truex Jr.	Furniture Row Racing	Toyota	38.425	187.378
3	21	Ryan Blaney	Wood Brothers Racing	Ford	38.489	187.066
Official final practice results

== Qualifying ==
Kyle Larson scored the pole for the race with a time of 38.493 and a speed of 187.047 mph (301.023 km/h). “It was an interesting qualifying for us,” Larson said. “I ran the bottom in Turns 3 and 4. I knew everybody was running the top in 3 and 4 and my plan was to go up there in the second round, but thought I maybe got through 1 and 2 okay enough to run the bottom. I knew the third round I was going to have to move up. Our Target Chevy was really good, really balanced up there. I was surprised."

=== Qualifying results ===
Pos	No.	Driver	Team	Manufacturer	R1	R2	R3
1	42	Kyle Larson	Chip Ganassi Racing	Chevrolet	38.551	38.679	38.493
2	11	Denny Hamlin	Joe Gibbs Racing	Toyota	38.552	38.519	38.507
3	2	Brad Keselowski	Team Penske	Ford	38.454	38.847	38.606
4	78	Martin Truex Jr.	Furniture Row Racing	Toyota	38.775	38.818	38.630
5	31	Ryan Newman	Richard Childress Racing	Chevrolet	38.735	38.948	38.684
6	20	Matt Kenseth	Joe Gibbs Racing	Toyota	38.646	38.570	38.702
7	4	Kevin Harvick	Stewart–Haas Racing	Ford	38.245	38.549	38.710
8	1	Jamie McMurray	Chip Ganassi Racing	Chevrolet	38.818	38.628	38.768
9	18	Kyle Busch	Joe Gibbs Racing	Toyota	38.487	38.668	38.835
10	19	Daniel Suárez (R)	Joe Gibbs Racing	Toyota	38.890	38.799	38.958
11	3	Austin Dillon	Richard Childress Racing	Chevrolet	38.937	38.860	38.980
12	5	Kasey Kahne	Hendrick Motorsports	Chevrolet	38.805	38.910	39.139
13	24	Chase Elliott	Hendrick Motorsports	Chevrolet	39.923	38.954	—
14	77	Erik Jones (R)	Furniture Row Racing	Toyota	39.311	38.973	—
15	41	Kurt Busch	Stewart–Haas Racing	Ford	38.878	39.005	—
16	17	Ricky Stenhouse Jr.	Roush Fenway Racing	Ford	38.923	39.050	—
17	14	Clint Bowyer	Stewart–Haas Racing	Ford	38.855	39.152	—
18	88	Dale Earnhardt Jr.	Hendrick Motorsports	Chevrolet	38.829	39.180	—
19	21	Ryan Blaney	Wood Brothers Racing	Ford	39.141	39.207	—
20	37	Chris Buescher	JTG Daugherty Racing	Chevrolet	39.130	39.286	—
21	13	Ty Dillon (R)	Germain Racing	Chevrolet	38.935	39.322	—
22	10	Danica Patrick	Stewart–Haas Racing	Ford	38.901	39.341	—
23	27	Paul Menard	Richard Childress Racing	Chevrolet	39.217	0.000	—
24	47	A. J. Allmendinger	JTG Daugherty Racing	Chevrolet	39.240	0.000	—
25	95	Michael McDowell	Leavine Family Racing	Chevrolet	39.408	—	—
26	34	Landon Cassill	Front Row Motorsports	Ford	39.409	—	—
27	38	David Ragan	Front Row Motorsports	Ford	39.640	—	—
28	72	Cole Whitt	TriStar Motorsports	Chevrolet	39.708	—	—
29	15	Reed Sorenson	Premium Motorsports	Toyota	40.028	—	—
30	83	Corey LaJoie (R)	BK Racing	Toyota	40.039	—	—
31	43	Aric Almirola	Richard Petty Motorsports	Ford	40.948	—	—
32	33	Jeffrey Earnhardt	Circle Sport – The Motorsports Group	Chevrolet	41.128	—	—
33	55	Derrike Cope	Premium Motorsports	Chevrolet	41.455	—	—
34	51	Timmy Hill (i)	Rick Ware Racing	Chevrolet	41.783	—	—
35	22	Joey Logano	Team Penske	Ford	0.000	—	—
36	6	Trevor Bayne	Roush Fenway Racing	Ford	0.000	—	—
37	48	Jimmie Johnson	Hendrick Motorsports	Chevrolet	0.000	—	—
38	32	Matt DiBenedetto	Go Fas Racing	Ford	0.000	—	—
39	23	Gray Gaulding (R)	BK Racing	Toyota	0.000	—	—
Official qualifying results

== Race ==
=== First stage ===
Kyle Larson led the field to the green flag at 3:50 p.m. On the initial start, Denny Hamlin spun his tires and forced Brad Keselowski to check up. He backed into Ryan Newman – and Kevin Harvick, who was lined up behind Newman – and was turned up the track, damaging the left-rear quarter panel in the process. Keselowski kept going, but got loose exiting Turn 4, with help from Jimmie Johnson, and spun through the frontstretch grass, bringing out the first caution of the race on the third lap.

The race restarted on the eighth lap. Harvick made an unscheduled stop for damage on lap 23. A cycle of green flag stops started on lap 30 and resulted in Martin Truex Jr. cycling to the lead. Larson took it back exiting Turn 4 on lap 49, won the first stage and the second caution flew for the completion of the stage on lap 60. Truex exited pit road first. Ryan Blaney (removing equipment from the pit box) and Austin Dillon (speeding) restarted the race from the tail end of the field for pit road infractions.

=== Second stage ===
The race restarted on lap 68. The second stage was only broken up by green flag stops on lap 91, which resulted in Truex retaining the lead. It ended with him winning the stage and the third caution flew on lap 120 for its completion.

=== Final stage ===
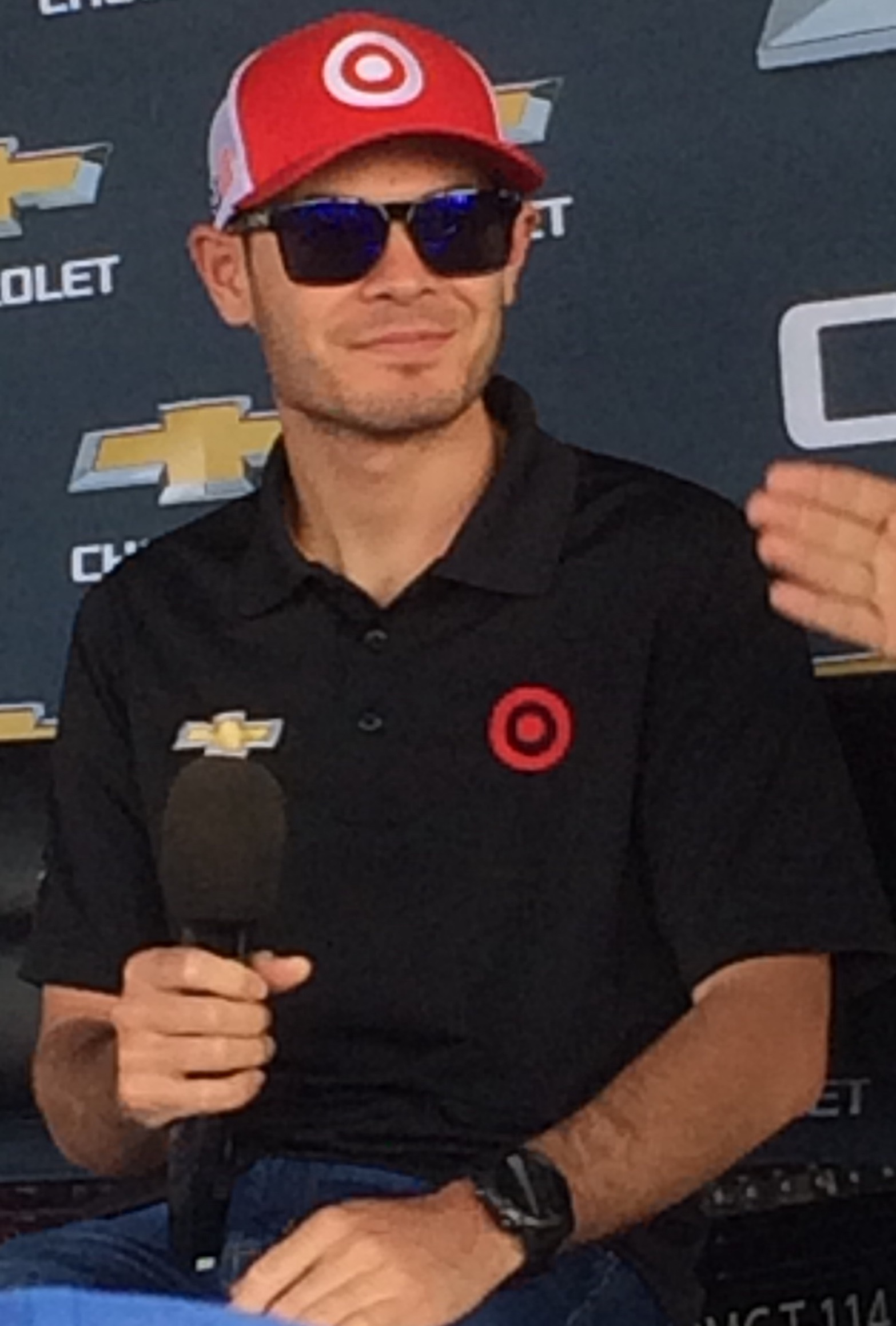
Kyle Larson won the race from the pole position.

The race restarted with 73 laps to go. Larson powered by Truex on the bottom in Turn 1 to retake the lead on the restart. For most of the stage, it was a repeat of the second stage. It was broken up with 49 to go when cars started pitting under green, Larson and Truex pitted together with 45 to go and Larson regained it with 37 to go. During the cycle, Kyle Busch led for a few laps, followed by Ty Dillon and Johnson was turned by Truex on pit road. Gray Gaulding suffered a right-front tire blowout and slammed the wall in Turn 1, bringing out the fourth caution with 20 to go. Truex, who entered pit road under the caution second, left seventh after he "stopped too deep in the box."

The race restarted with 16 to go. Exiting Turn 2 on the restart, Truex hooked the left-rear corner of Matt Kenseth, then sent him spinning down the track and into the inside retaining wall, bringing out the fifth caution.

The race restarted with 11 to go. Two laps later, Corey LaJoie spun out in Turn 2, bringing out the sixth caution. Hamlin, taking the lead as a result, Truex and Jamie McMurray elected to stay out under the caution, while everyone else hit pit road.

The race restarted with five to go. Larson quickly took second from Truex on the backstretch and had a run on Hamlin, but found himself boxed in by Truex to his left and the outside wall to his right. He made the pass for the lead exiting Turn 2 with three to go seconds before the seventh caution flew for Ricky Stenhouse Jr. spinning out in Turn 2.

==== Overtime ====
The race restarted in overtime with two to go and Larson drove on to score the victory.

== Post-race ==
=== Driver comments ===
In victory lane, Larson said of the final two restarts that he was "staying as calm as [he] could," but he was "frustrated" as well. "It seems like every time I get to the lead at the end of one of these things, the caution comes out and I've got to fight people off on restarts," he added. "Our Target Chevy was amazing all day. We were able to lead a lot of laps today. Truex was better than us that second stage by quite a bit. We were able to get the jump on him the following restart and led pretty much the rest of the distance. I had to fight them off there after the green flag stops (before the final caution), and that was a lot of fun. This is just amazing. We've been so good all year long, three seconds in a row. I've been watching all the TV like 'He doesn't know how to win,' but we knew how to win today, so that was good."

"Great perseverance from this team," Keselowski said on pit road after rallying from a Lap 3 spin to finish runner-up. "I got out of the car and looked at the damage. It's torn to pieces. I feel lucky to finish second and curious what we could have done if we weren't torn up. Great day for us to persevere, despite adversity. You'll have that in a 36-race season, so proud of team for that."

Clint Bowyer, who earned his first top-five finish since the 2015 Irwin Tools Night Race with a third-place finish, said his team is "getting closer. This is a good track for me. I wanted to win that damn thing, but to come home with a wild finish and everything that it was, we’ll take it.”

Truex, who finished fourth after electing not to pit under the penultimate caution, said it was "not the situation we wanted to be in, but we thought more guys would stay out there. I think we only ran a few laps. It was definitely a disadvantage at the end and just really tight. Holding on for fourth was good for points.”

== Race results ==
=== Stage results ===
Stage 1 Laps: 60

Pos	No	Driver	Team	Manufacturer	Points
1	42	Kyle Larson	Chip Ganassi Racing	Chevrolet	10
2	78	Martin Truex Jr.	Furniture Row Racing	Toyota	9
3	24	Chase Elliott	Hendrick Motorsports	Chevrolet	8
4	1	Jamie McMurray	Chip Ganassi Racing	Chevrolet	7
5	18	Kyle Busch	Joe Gibbs Racing	Toyota	6
6	14	Clint Bowyer	Stewart–Haas Racing	Ford	5
7	22	Joey Logano	Team Penske	Ford	4
8	77	Erik Jones (R)	Furniture Row Racing	Toyota	3
9	21	Ryan Blaney	Wood Brothers Racing	Ford	2
10	11	Denny Hamlin	Joe Gibbs Racing	Toyota	1
Official stage one results

Stage 2 Laps: 60

Pos	No	Driver	Team	Manufacturer	Points
1	78	Martin Truex Jr.	Furniture Row Racing	Toyota	10
2	42	Kyle Larson	Chip Ganassi Racing	Chevrolet	9
3	24	Chase Elliott	Hendrick Motorsports	Chevrolet	8
4	14	Clint Bowyer	Stewart–Haas Racing	Ford	7
5	77	Erik Jones (R)	Furniture Row Racing	Toyota	6
6	1	Jamie McMurray	Chip Ganassi Racing	Chevrolet	5
7	18	Kyle Busch	Joe Gibbs Racing	Toyota	4
8	22	Joey Logano	Team Penske	Ford	3
9	11	Denny Hamlin	Joe Gibbs Racing	Toyota	2
10	2	Brad Keselowski	Team Penske	Ford	1
Official stage two results

=== Final stage results ===
Stage 3 Laps: 82

Pos	No	Driver	Team	Manufacturer	Laps	Points
1	42	Kyle Larson	Chip Ganassi Racing	Chevrolet	202	59
2	2	Brad Keselowski	Team Penske	Ford	202	36
3	14	Clint Bowyer	Stewart–Haas Racing	Ford	202	46
4	78	Martin Truex Jr.	Furniture Row Racing	Toyota	202	52
5	22	Joey Logano	Team Penske	Ford	202	39
6	1	Jamie McMurray	Chip Ganassi Racing	Chevrolet	202	43
7	19	Daniel Suárez (R)	Joe Gibbs Racing	Toyota	202	30
8	18	Kyle Busch	Joe Gibbs Racing	Toyota	202	39
9	21	Ryan Blaney	Wood Brothers Racing	Ford	202	30
10	24	Chase Elliott	Hendrick Motorsports	Chevrolet	202	43
11	3	Austin Dillon	Richard Childress Racing	Chevrolet	202	26
12	77	Erik Jones (R)	Furniture Row Racing	Toyota	202	34
13	4	Kevin Harvick	Stewart–Haas Racing	Ford	202	24
14	11	Denny Hamlin	Joe Gibbs Racing	Toyota	202	26
15	31	Ryan Newman	Richard Childress Racing	Chevrolet	202	22
16	88	Dale Earnhardt Jr.	Hendrick Motorsports	Chevrolet	202	21
17	47	A. J. Allmendinger	JTG Daugherty Racing	Chevrolet	202	20
18	13	Ty Dillon (R)	Germain Racing	Chevrolet	202	19
19	43	Aric Almirola	Richard Petty Motorsports	Ford	202	18
20	5	Kasey Kahne	Hendrick Motorsports	Chevrolet	202	17
21	48	Jimmie Johnson	Hendrick Motorsports	Chevrolet	202	16
22	17	Ricky Stenhouse Jr.	Roush Fenway Racing	Ford	202	15
23	6	Trevor Bayne	Roush Fenway Racing	Ford	202	14
24	41	Kurt Busch	Stewart–Haas Racing	Ford	201	13
25	37	Chris Buescher	JTG Daugherty Racing	Chevrolet	201	12
26	10	Danica Patrick	Stewart–Haas Racing	Ford	200	11
27	34	Landon Cassill	Front Row Motorsports	Ford	200	10
28	27	Paul Menard	Richard Childress Racing	Chevrolet	200	9
29	32	Matt DiBenedetto	Fas Lane Racing	Ford	200	8
30	83	Corey LaJoie (R)	BK Racing	Toyota	200	7
31	38	David Ragan	Front Row Motorsports	Ford	199	6
32	72	Cole Whitt	TriStar Motorsports	Chevrolet	199	5
33	95	Michael McDowell	Leavine Family Racing	Chevrolet	198	4
34	15	Reed Sorenson	Premium Motorsports	Toyota	197	3
35	51	Timmy Hill (i)	Rick Ware Racing	Chevrolet	193	0
36	20	Matt Kenseth	Joe Gibbs Racing	Toyota	184	1
37	23	Gray Gaulding (R)	BK Racing	Toyota	173	1
38	55	Derrike Cope	Premium Motorsports	Chevrolet	117	1
39	33	Jeffrey Earnhardt	Circle Sport – The Motorsports Group	Chevrolet	99	1
Official race results

=== Race statistics ===
- Lead changes: 17 among 8 different drivers
- Cautions/Laps: 7 for 29 laps
- Red flags: 0
- Time of race: 2 hours, 57 minutes and 46 seconds
- Average speed: 136.359 miles per hour (219.449 km/h)

== Media ==
=== Television ===
The race was the 17th race Fox Sports covered at Auto Club Speedway. Mike Joy, three-time Auto Club winner Jeff Gordon and Darrell Waltrip called the race from the broadcast booth, while Jamie Little, Vince Welch and Matt Yocum handled pit road duties.

Fox
Booth announcers	Pit reporters
Lap-by-lap: Mike Joy; Color commentator: Jeff Gordon; Color commentator: Darrell Waltrip	Jamie Little; Vince Welch; Matt Yocum

=== Radio ===
MRN had the radio call for the race which was also simulcasted on SiriusXM's NASCAR Radio channel. Joe Moore, Jeff Striegle and 2001 race winner Rusty Wallace called the race from the booth when the field was racing down the front stretch. Dan Hubbard called the race from a billboard outside turn 2 when the field was racing through turns 1 and 2. Kurt Becker called the race from a billboard outside turn 3 when the field was racing through turns 3 and 4. Alex Hayden, Winston Kelley and Steve Post worked pit road for MRN.

MRN
Booth announcers	Turn announcers	Pit reporters
Lead announcer: Joe Moore; Announcer: Jeff Striegle; Announcer: Rusty Wallace	Turns 1 & 2: Dan Hubbard; Turns 3 & 4: Kurt Becker	Alex Hayden; Winston Kelley; Steve Post

== Standings after the race ==
Drivers' Championship standings

	Pos	Driver	Points
	1	Kyle Larson	243
1	2	Chase Elliott	214 (–29)
1	3	Martin Truex Jr.	205 (–38)
2	4	Brad Keselowski	179 (–64)
	5	Joey Logano	174 (–69)
2	6	Jamie McMurray	162 (–81)
1	7	Ryan Blaney	157 (–86)
7	8	Clint Bowyer	143 (–100)
2	9	Kevin Harvick	137 (–106)
3	10	Kyle Busch	136 (–107)
	11	Ryan Newman	123 (–120)
2	12	Denny Hamlin	123 (–120)
3	13	Kasey Kahne	122 (–121)
5	14	Kurt Busch	118 (–125)
3	15	Erik Jones	116 (–127)
4	16	Trevor Bayne	114 (–129)
Official driver's standings

Manufacturers' Championship standings

	Pos	Manufacturer	Points
1	1	Chevrolet	184
1	2	Ford	181 (–3)
	3	Toyota	170 (–14)
Official manufacturers' standings

- Note: Only the first 16 positions are included for the driver standings.

Previous race: 2017 Camping World 500	Monster Energy NASCAR Cup Series; 2017 season	Next race: 2017 STP 500
