= 2017 Camping World 500 =

NASCAR Cup Series race in Arizona, USA

Race details
- Race 4 of 36 in the 2017 Monster Energy NASCAR Cup Series
- Date: March 19, 2017
- Location: Phoenix International Raceway in Avondale, Arizona
- Course: Permanent racing facility
- Course length: 1 miles (1.609 km)
- Distance: 314 laps, 314 mi (505.334 km)
- Scheduled distance: 312 laps, 312 mi (502.115 km)
- Average speed: 104.271 miles per hour (167.808 km/h)

Pole position
Driver	Joey Logano	Team Penske
- Time: 26.216

Most laps led
Driver	Kyle Busch	Joe Gibbs Racing
- Laps: 114

Winner
No. 31	Ryan Newman	Richard Childress Racing

Television in the United States
- Network: Fox
- Announcers: Mike Joy, Jeff Gordon and Darrell Waltrip

Radio in the United States
- Radio: MRN
- Booth announcers: Joe Moore, Jeff Striegle and Rusty Wallace
- Turn announcers: Dan Hubbard (1 & 2) and Kyle Rickey (3 & 4)

The 2017 Camping World 500 was a Monster Energy NASCAR Cup Series race held on March 19, 2017, at Phoenix International Raceway in Avondale, Arizona. Contested over 314 laps, extended from 312 laps due to overtime, on the 1-mile (1.6-kilometre) oval, it was the fourth race of the 2017 Monster Energy NASCAR Cup Series season. Ryan Newman won the race, taking his – and Richard Childress Racing's – first Cup Series victory since 2013.

== Entry list ==
No.	Driver	Team	Manufacturer
1	Jamie McMurray	Chip Ganassi Racing	Chevrolet
2	Brad Keselowski	Team Penske	Ford
3	Austin Dillon	Richard Childress Racing	Chevrolet
4	Kevin Harvick	Stewart–Haas Racing	Ford
5	Kasey Kahne	Hendrick Motorsports	Chevrolet
6	Trevor Bayne	Roush Fenway Racing	Ford
10	Danica Patrick	Stewart–Haas Racing	Ford
11	Denny Hamlin	Joe Gibbs Racing	Toyota
13	Ty Dillon (R)	Germain Racing	Chevrolet
14	Clint Bowyer	Stewart–Haas Racing	Ford
15	Reed Sorenson	Premium Motorsports	Chevrolet
17	Ricky Stenhouse Jr.	Roush Fenway Racing	Ford
18	Kyle Busch	Joe Gibbs Racing	Toyota
19	Daniel Suárez (R)	Joe Gibbs Racing	Toyota
20	Matt Kenseth	Joe Gibbs Racing	Toyota
21	Ryan Blaney	Wood Brothers Racing	Ford
22	Joey Logano	Team Penske	Ford
23	Gray Gaulding (R)	BK Racing	Toyota
24	Chase Elliott	Hendrick Motorsports	Chevrolet
27	Paul Menard	Richard Childress Racing	Chevrolet
31	Ryan Newman	Richard Childress Racing	Chevrolet
32	Matt DiBenedetto	Go Fas Racing	Ford
33	Jeffrey Earnhardt	Circle Sport – The Motorsports Group	Chevrolet
34	Landon Cassill	Front Row Motorsports	Ford
37	Chris Buescher	JTG Daugherty Racing	Chevrolet
38	David Ragan	Front Row Motorsports	Ford
41	Kurt Busch	Stewart–Haas Racing	Ford
42	Kyle Larson	Chip Ganassi Racing	Chevrolet
43	Aric Almirola	Richard Petty Motorsports	Ford
47	A. J. Allmendinger	JTG Daugherty Racing	Chevrolet
48	Jimmie Johnson	Hendrick Motorsports	Chevrolet
51	Timmy Hill (i)	Rick Ware Racing	Chevrolet
55	Derrike Cope	Premium Motorsports	Chevrolet
72	Cole Whitt	Tri-Star Motorsports	Chevrolet
77	Erik Jones (R)	Furniture Row Racing	Toyota
78	Martin Truex Jr.	Furniture Row Racing	Toyota
83	Corey LaJoie (R)	BK Racing	Toyota
88	Dale Earnhardt Jr.	Hendrick Motorsports	Chevrolet
95	Michael McDowell	Leavine Family Racing	Chevrolet
Official entry list

== Practice ==
=== First practice ===
Chase Elliott was the fastest in the first practice session with a time of 26.258 seconds and a speed of 137.101 mph (220.643 km/h).

Pos	No.	Driver	Team	Manufacturer	Time	Speed
1	24	Chase Elliott	Hendrick Motorsports	Chevrolet	26.258	137.101
2	42	Kyle Larson	Chip Ganassi Racing	Chevrolet	26.379	136.472
3	22	Joey Logano	Team Penske	Ford	26.385	136.441
Official first practice results

=== Second practice ===
Chase Elliott was the fastest in the second practice session with a time of 26.475 seconds and a speed of 135.977 mph (218.834 km/h).

Pos	No.	Driver	Team	Manufacturer	Time	Speed
1	24	Chase Elliott	Hendrick Motorsports	Chevrolet	26.475	135.977
2	22	Joey Logano	Team Penske	Ford	26.575	135.466
3	42	Kyle Larson	Chip Ganassi Racing	Chevrolet	26.603	135.323
Official second practice results

=== Final practice ===
Joey Logano was the fastest in the final practice session with a time of 26.719 seconds and a speed of 134.736 mph (216.837 km/h).

Pos	No.	Driver	Team	Manufacturer	Time	Speed
1	22	Joey Logano	Team Penske	Ford	26.719	134.736
2	20	Matt Kenseth	Joe Gibbs Racing	Toyota	26.762	134.519
3	18	Kyle Busch	Joe Gibbs Racing	Toyota	26.786	134.399
Official final practice results

== Qualifying ==
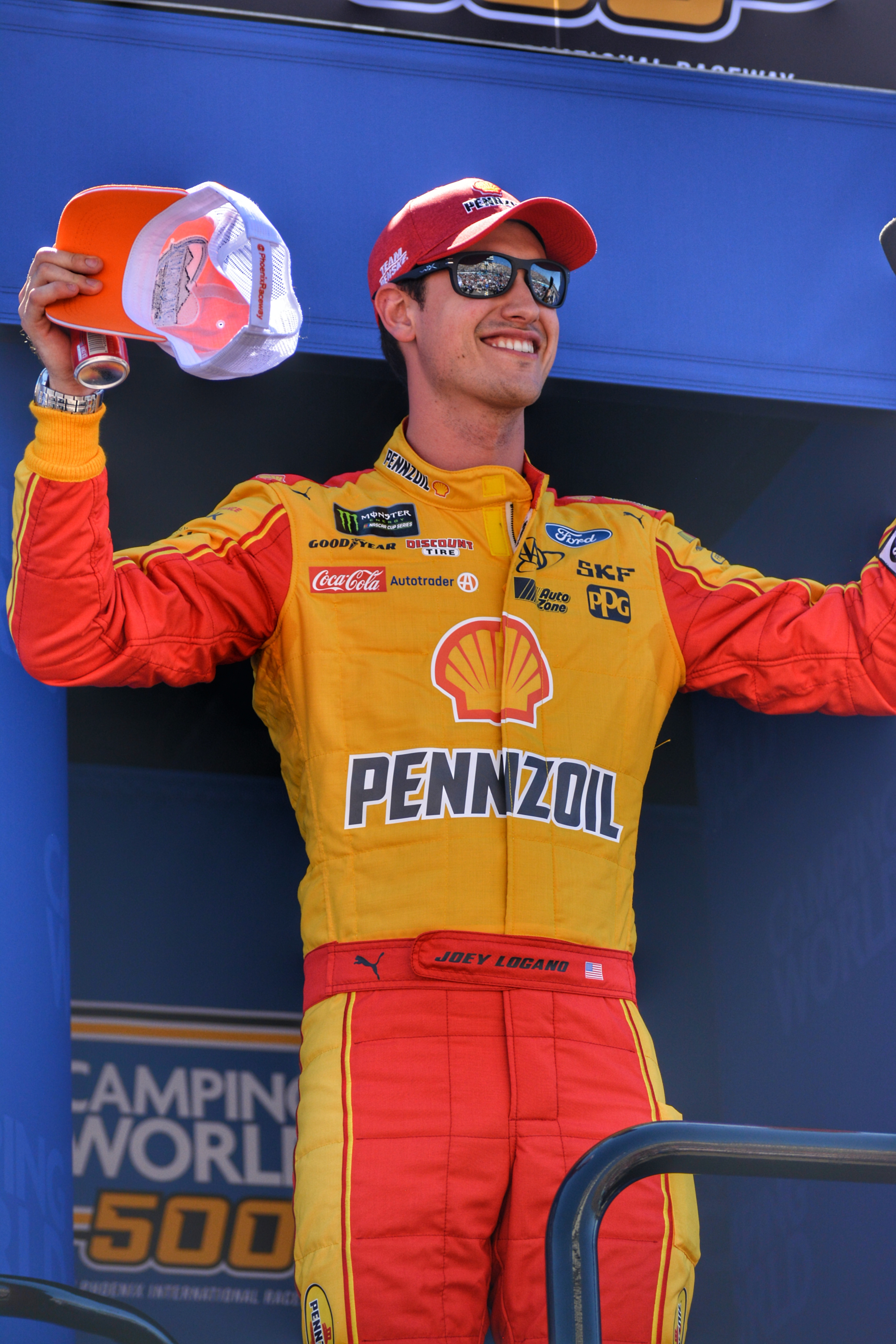
Joey Logano scored the pole position.

Joey Logano scored the pole for the race with a time of 26.216 and a speed of 137.321 mph (220.997 km/h). He said after his run he believed he "had a pretty good (Turns) 1 and 2, I was able to hook the bottom. (Turns) 3 and 4 is where nothing went right. I didn’t think it was going to be quite good enough. I pushed as hard as I could. Sometimes you overdrive it a little bit and you can still make some speed. Proud of this team and proud of the all-Ford front row. That’s a pretty special deal.”

=== Qualifying results ===
Pos	No.	Driver	Team	Manufacturer	R1	R2	R3
1	22	Joey Logano	Team Penske	Ford	26.552	26.265	26.216
2	21	Ryan Blaney	Wood Brothers Racing	Ford	26.523	26.329	26.301
3	88	Dale Earnhardt Jr.	Hendrick Motorsports	Chevrolet	26.560	26.432	26.319
4	42	Kyle Larson	Chip Ganassi Racing	Chevrolet	26.336	26.452	26.344
5	1	Jamie McMurray	Chip Ganassi Racing	Chevrolet	26.380	26.413	26.412
6	2	Brad Keselowski	Team Penske	Ford	26.573	26.481	26.433
7	24	Chase Elliott	Hendrick Motorsports	Chevrolet	26.574	26.361	26.441
8	77	Erik Jones (R)	Furniture Row Racing	Toyota	26.845	26.451	26.444
9	18	Kyle Busch	Joe Gibbs Racing	Toyota	26.779	26.496	26.485
10	5	Kasey Kahne	Hendrick Motorsports	Chevrolet	26.647	26.468	26.498
11	41	Kurt Busch	Stewart–Haas Racing	Ford	26.667	26.461	26.502
12	20	Matt Kenseth	Joe Gibbs Racing	Toyota	26.653	26.441	26.530
13	14	Clint Bowyer	Stewart–Haas Racing	Ford	26.861	26.523	—
14	48	Jimmie Johnson	Hendrick Motorsports	Chevrolet	26.610	26.544	—
15	13	Ty Dillon (R)	Germain Racing	Chevrolet	26.846	26.548	—
16	78	Martin Truex Jr.	Furniture Row Racing	Toyota	26.659	26.562	—
17	3	Austin Dillon	Richard Childress Racing	Chevrolet	26.717	26.587	—
18	27	Paul Menard	Richard Childress Racing	Chevrolet	26.690	26.598	—
19	11	Denny Hamlin	Joe Gibbs Racing	Toyota	26.643	26.634	—
20	47	A. J. Allmendinger	JTG Daugherty Racing	Chevrolet	26.787	26.663	—
21	17	Ricky Stenhouse Jr.	Roush Fenway Racing	Ford	26.614	26.672	—
22	31	Ryan Newman	Richard Childress Racing	Chevrolet	26.562	26.702	—
23	4	Kevin Harvick	Stewart–Haas Racing	Ford	26.585	26.772	—
24	6	Trevor Bayne	Roush Fenway Racing	Ford	26.788	26.787	—
25	95	Michael McDowell	Leavine Family Racing	Chevrolet	26.888	—	—
26	10	Danica Patrick	Stewart–Haas Racing	Ford	26.908	—	—
27	19	Daniel Suárez (R)	Joe Gibbs Racing	Toyota	26.913	—	—
28	43	Aric Almirola	Richard Petty Motorsports	Ford	26.973	—	—
29	34	Landon Cassill	Front Row Motorsports	Ford	27.005	—	—
30	32	Matt DiBenedetto	Go Fas Racing	Ford	27.028	—	—
31	83	Corey LaJoie (R)	BK Racing	Toyota	27.055	—	—
32	72	Cole Whitt	TriStar Motorsports	Chevrolet	27.061	—	—
33	37	Chris Buescher	JTG Daugherty Racing	Chevrolet	27.065	—	—
34	38	David Ragan	Front Row Motorsports	Ford	27.081	—	—
35	15	Reed Sorenson	Premium Motorsports	Chevrolet	27.262	—	—
36	23	Gray Gaulding (R)	BK Racing	Toyota	27.379	—	—
37	55	Derrike Cope	Premium Motorsports	Chevrolet	27.860	—	—
38	33	Jeffrey Earnhardt	Circle Sport – The Motorsports Group	Chevrolet	28.118	—	—
39	51	Timmy Hill (i)	Rick Ware Racing	Chevrolet	28.437	—	—
Official qualifying results

== Race ==
=== First stage ===
Joey Logano led the field to the green flag at 3:48 p.m. It remained caution-free until Corey LaJoie slammed the wall in the dogleg on the backstretch on lap 26, bringing out the first caution of the race.

The race restarted on lap 33. The uneventful stage concluded on lap 75 when Logano took the stage victory and the second caution flew at its conclusion. Kurt Busch's team was changing a battery, sent him out to beat the pace car off pit road so as to not lose a lap. He was busted for speeding in the process and held a lap on pit road.

=== Second stage ===
The race restarted on lap 86. Chase Elliott passed Logano going into Turn 1 on the restart to take the lead the following lap. The third caution flew on lap 118 when LaJoie slammed the wall in Turn 1. Aric Almirola and Logano restarted the race from the tail end of the field for speeding on pit road.

The race restarted on lap 123. It went green the rest of the stage, Elliott scored the stage victory and the fourth caution flew to conclude the second stage.

=== Final stage ===
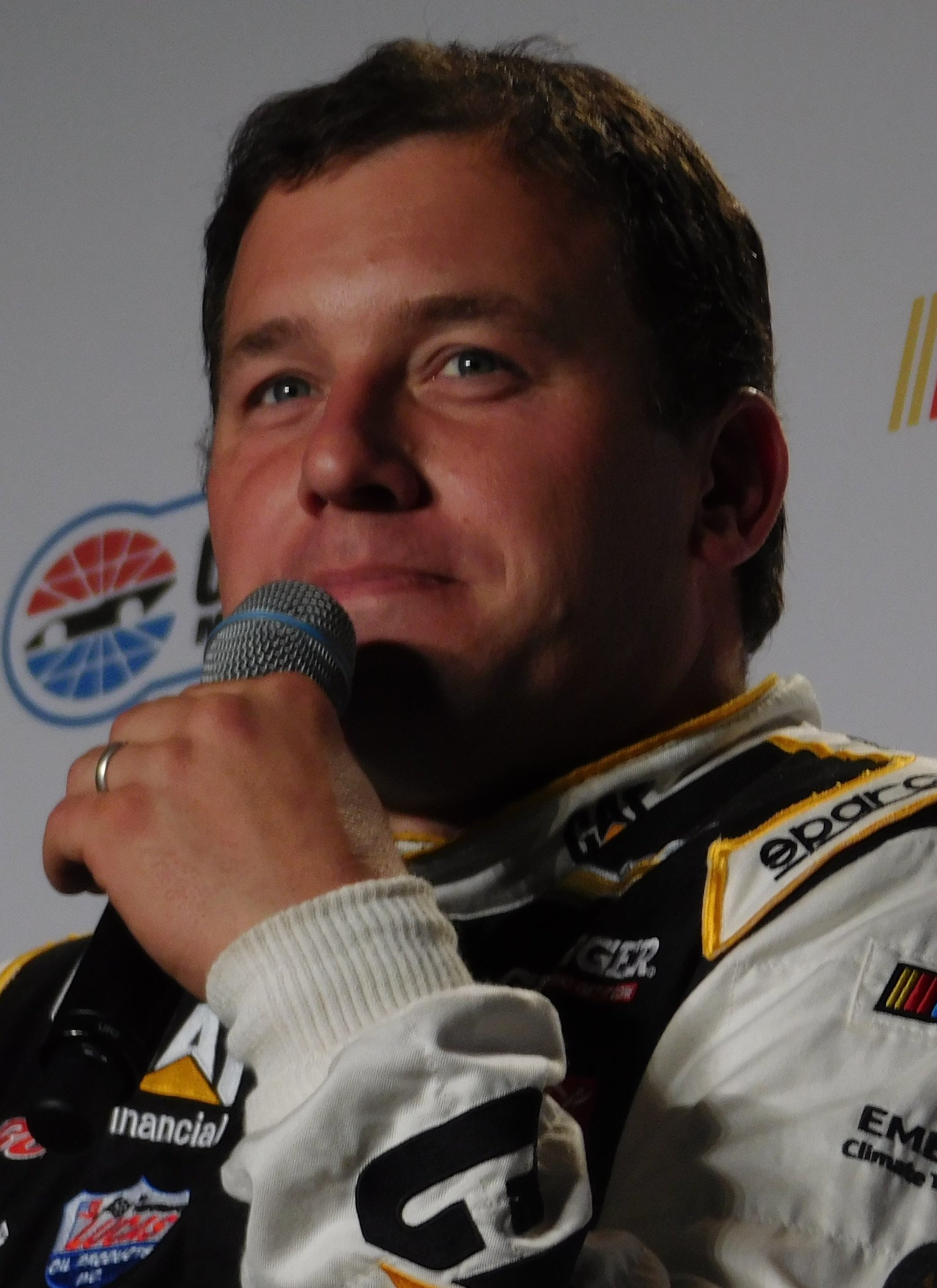
Ryan Newman won the race.

The race restarted on lap 158. Matt Kenseth suffered a right-front tire blowout and slammed the wall in Turn 4, bringing out the fifth caution with 120 laps to go. Kyle Busch exited pit road with the race lead.

The race restarted with 112 to go. The sixth caution flew with 106 to go when David Ragan cut his left-rear tire and spun out, collecting Gray Gaulding to his outside in Turn 1.

The race restarted with 100 to go. Cole Whitt brought out the seventh caution with 55 to go when he slammed the wall in Turn 2. Ryan Blaney restarted the race from the tail end of the field for speeding on pit road.

The race restarted with 51 to go. Busch had the race in check until Logano suffered a right-front tire blowout – stemming from brake problems – and slammed the wall in Turn 1, bringing out the eighth caution with six to go. Ryan Newman chose not to pit and assumed the race lead along with Ricky Stenhouse Jr., and Martin Truex Jr. Kyle Larson exited pit road first among the cars that opted to pit.

==== Overtime ====
Newman powered ahead of Larson on the final restart. Larson came down on Ricky Stenhouse Jr. to his inside and got loose. This allowed Newman to drive on to victory.

== Post-race ==
=== Driver comments ===
Newman said that this win was "sweet for so many reasons. I said that when I won the Brickyard. I said that when I won at Daytona. This has been the longest drought I’ve ever been in. ... It’s just a hard‑fought race, a hard‑fought battle, a hard‑fought four years.”

== Race results ==
=== Stage results ===
Stage 1 Laps: 75

Pos	No	Driver	Team	Manufacturer	Points
1	22	Joey Logano	Team Penske	Ford	10
2	42	Kyle Larson	Chip Ganassi Racing	Chevrolet	9
3	2	Brad Keselowski	Team Penske	Ford	8
4	24	Chase Elliott	Hendrick Motorsports	Chevrolet	7
5	1	Jamie McMurray	Chip Ganassi Racing	Chevrolet	6
6	18	Kyle Busch	Joe Gibbs Racing	Toyota	5
7	21	Ryan Blaney	Wood Brothers Racing	Ford	4
8	48	Jimmie Johnson	Hendrick Motorsports	Chevrolet	3
9	31	Ryan Newman	Richard Childress Racing	Chevrolet	2
10	88	Dale Earnhardt Jr.	Hendrick Motorsports	Chevrolet	1
Official stage one results

Stage 2 Laps: 75

Pos	No	Driver	Team	Manufacturer	Points
1	24	Chase Elliott	Hendrick Motorsports	Chevrolet	10
2	42	Kyle Larson	Chip Ganassi Racing	Chevrolet	9
3	18	Kyle Busch	Joe Gibbs Racing	Toyota	8
4	48	Jimmie Johnson	Hendrick Motorsports	Chevrolet	7
5	2	Brad Keselowski	Team Penske	Ford	6
6	1	Jamie McMurray	Chip Ganassi Racing	Chevrolet	5
7	77	Erik Jones (R)	Furniture Row Racing	Toyota	4
8	21	Ryan Blaney	Wood Brothers Racing	Ford	3
9	11	Denny Hamlin	Joe Gibbs Racing	Toyota	2
10	4	Kevin Harvick	Stewart–Haas Racing	Ford	1
Official stage two results

=== Final stage results ===
Stage 3 Laps: 164

Pos	No	Driver	Team	Manufacturer	Laps	Points
1	31	Ryan Newman	Richard Childress Racing	Chevrolet	314	42
2	42	Kyle Larson	Chip Ganassi Racing	Chevrolet	314	53
3	18	Kyle Busch	Joe Gibbs Racing	Toyota	314	47
4	17	Ricky Stenhouse Jr.	Roush Fenway Racing	Ford	314	33
5	2	Brad Keselowski	Team Penske	Ford	314	46
6	4	Kevin Harvick	Stewart–Haas Racing	Ford	314	32
7	19	Daniel Suárez (R)	Joe Gibbs Racing	Toyota	314	30
8	77	Erik Jones (R)	Furniture Row Racing	Toyota	314	33
9	48	Jimmie Johnson	Hendrick Motorsports	Chevrolet	314	38
10	11	Denny Hamlin	Joe Gibbs Racing	Toyota	314	29
11	78	Martin Truex Jr.	Furniture Row Racing	Toyota	314	26
12	24	Chase Elliott	Hendrick Motorsports	Chevrolet	314	42
13	14	Clint Bowyer	Stewart–Haas Racing	Ford	314	24
14	88	Dale Earnhardt Jr.	Hendrick Motorsports	Chevrolet	314	24
15	1	Jamie McMurray	Chip Ganassi Racing	Chevrolet	314	33
16	13	Ty Dillon (R)	Germain Racing	Chevrolet	314	21
17	43	Aric Almirola	Richard Petty Motorsports	Ford	314	20
18	3	Austin Dillon	Richard Childress Racing	Chevrolet	314	19
19	6	Trevor Bayne	Roush Fenway Racing	Ford	314	18
20	5	Kasey Kahne	Hendrick Motorsports	Chevrolet	314	17
21	27	Paul Menard	Richard Childress Racing	Chevrolet	314	16
22	10	Danica Patrick	Stewart–Haas Racing	Ford	314	15
23	21	Ryan Blaney	Wood Brothers Racing	Ford	314	21
24	95	Michael McDowell	Leavine Family Racing	Chevrolet	314	13
25	41	Kurt Busch	Stewart–Haas Racing	Ford	314	12
26	47	A. J. Allmendinger	JTG Daugherty Racing	Chevrolet	314	11
27	37	Chris Buescher	JTG Daugherty Racing	Chevrolet	314	10
28	34	Landon Cassill	Front Row Motorsports	Ford	313	9
29	32	Matt DiBenedetto	Fas Lane Racing	Ford	313	8
30	15	Reed Sorenson	Premium Motorsports	Chevrolet	312	7
31	22	Joey Logano	Team Penske	Ford	307	16
32	51	Timmy Hill (i)	Rick Ware Racing	Chevrolet	307	0
33	55	Derrike Cope	Premium Motorsports	Chevrolet	307	4
34	72	Cole Whitt	TriStar Motorsports	Chevrolet	256	3
35	38	David Ragan	Front Row Motorsports	Ford	204	2
36	23	Gray Gaulding (R)	BK Racing	Toyota	201	1
37	20	Matt Kenseth	Joe Gibbs Racing	Toyota	190	1
38	83	Corey LaJoie (R)	BK Racing	Toyota	115	1
39	33	Jeffrey Earnhardt	Circle Sport – The Motorsports Group	Chevrolet	9	1
Official race results

=== Race statistics ===
- Lead changes: 15 among 8 different drivers
- Cautions/Laps: 8 for 45 laps
- Red flags: 0
- Time of race: 3 hours, 0 minutes and 41 seconds
- Average speed: 104.271 miles per hour (167.808 km/h)

== Media ==
=== Television ===
Fox Sports covered their 13th race at Phoenix International Raceway. Mike Joy, two-time Phoenix winner Jeff Gordon and Darrell Waltrip had the call in the broadcast booth, while Jamie Little, Vince Welch and Matt Yocum handled the pit road duties.

Fox
Booth announcers	Pit reporters
Lap-by-lap: Mike Joy; Color commentator: Jeff Gordon; Color commentator: Darrell Waltrip	Jamie Little; Vince Welch; Matt Yocum

=== Radio ===
MRN had the radio call for the race which also was simulcasted on SiriusXM's NASCAR Radio channel.

MRN
Booth announcers	Turn announcers	Pit reporters
Lead announcer: Joe Moore; Announcer: Jeff Striegle; Announcer: Rusty Wallace	Turns 1 & 2: Dan Hubbard; Turns 3 & 4: Kyle Rickey	Alex Hayden; Glenn Jarrett; Steve Post

== Standings after the race ==
Drivers' Championship standings

	Pos	Driver	Points
1	1	Kyle Larson	184
1	2	Brad Keselowski	178 (–6)
	3	Chase Elliott	171 (–13)
	4	Martin Truex Jr.	153 (–31)
	5	Joey Logano	135 (–49)
	6	Ryan Blaney	127 (–57)
1	7	Kevin Harvick	123 (–61)
2	8	Jamie McMurray	119 (–65)
2	9	Kurt Busch	105 (–79)
1	10	Kasey Kahne	105 (–79)
6	11	Ryan Newman	101 (–83)
1	12	Trevor Bayne	100 (–84)
6	13	Kyle Busch	97 (–87)
1	14	Denny Hamlin	97 (–87)
3	15	Clint Bowyer	97 (–87)
2	16	Jimmie Johnson	93 (–91)
Official driver's standings

Manufacturers' Championship standings

Pos	Manufacturer	Points
1	Ford	146
2	Chevrolet	144 (–2)
3	Toyota	137 (–9)
Official manufacturers' standings

- Note: Only the first 16 positions are included for the driver standings.

Previous race: 2017 Kobalt 400	Monster Energy NASCAR Cup Series; 2017 season	Next race: 2017 Auto Club 400
