= 2015 Irwin Tools Night Race =

Race details
- Race 24 of 36 in the 2015 NASCAR Sprint Cup Series
- 2015 Irwin Tools Night Race program cover, with artwork by former NASCAR artist Sam Bass. The painting is called "Over The Rainbow".
- Date: August 22, 2015
- Location: Bristol Motor Speedway in Bristol, Tennessee
- Course: Permanent racing facility
- Course length: .533 miles (.858 km)
- Distance: 500 laps, 266.5 mi (429 km)
- Weather: Clear evening skies with a temperature of 78 °F (26 °C)
- Average speed: 96.890 mph (155.929 km/h)

Pole position
Driver	Denny Hamlin	Joe Gibbs Racing
- Time: 14.602

Most laps led
Driver	Kyle Busch	Joe Gibbs Racing
- Laps: 192

Winner
No. 22	Joey Logano	Team Penske

Television in the United States
- Network: NBCSN
- Announcers: Rick Allen, Jeff Burton and Steve Letarte
- Nielsen ratings: 1.9/3 (Overnight); 2.1/4 (Final); 3.6 Million viewers

Radio in the United States
- Radio: PRN
- Booth announcers: Doug Rice, Mark Garrow and Wendy Venturini
- Turn announcers: Rob Albright (Backstretch)

The 2015 Irwin Tools Night Race was a NASCAR Sprint Cup Series race held on August 22, 2015, at Bristol Motor Speedway in Bristol, Tennessee. Contested over 500 laps on the .533 mile (.858 km) concrete short track, it was the 24th race of the 2015 NASCAR Sprint Cup Series season. Joey Logano won the race, making this his second consecutive and overall at the track and his third of the season. Kevin Harvick finished second for the tenth time in the season while Denny Hamlin, Jimmie Johnson and Clint Bowyer rounded out the top five.

Hamlin won the pole for the race and led 54 laps on his way to a third-place finish. Kyle Busch led a race high of 192 laps on his way to an eighth-place finish. The race had 14 lead changes among five different drivers, as well as eight caution flag periods for 52 laps.

This was the 11th career victory for Joey Logano, third of the season, second at Bristol Motor Speedway and 12th at the track for Team Penske. Despite winning the race, he left Bristol trailing Kevin Harvick by 43-points in the drivers points standings. Ford left Bristol trailing Toyota by one-point for second in the manufacturer standings and Chevrolet by 71 for the points lead.

The Irwin Tools Nights Race was carried by NBC Sports on the cable/satellite NBCSN network for the American television audience. The radio broadcast for the race was carried by the Performance Racing Network and Sirius XM NASCAR Radio.

== Report ==
=== Background ===
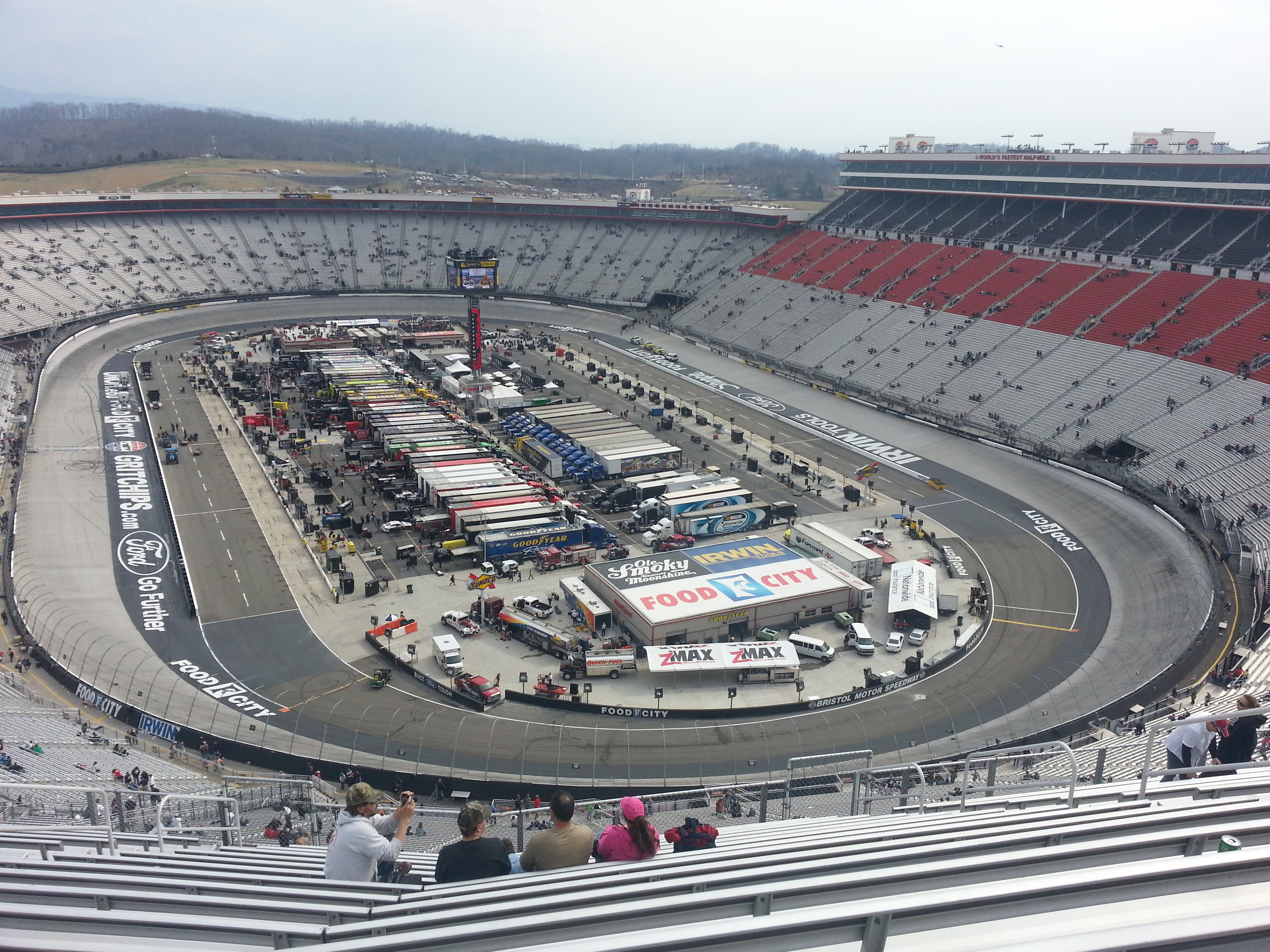
Bristol Motor Speedway, the track where the race will be held.

Bristol Motor Speedway is a 0.533-mile (0.858 km) oval short track in Bristol, Tennessee. Kevin Harvick entered Bristol with a 48–point lead over Joey Logano. Dale Earnhardt Jr. entered 82 back. Martin Truex Jr. entered 111 back. Brad Keselowski entered 112 back.

==== Entry list ====
The entry list for the Irwin Tools Night Race was released on Monday, August 17 at 11:17 a.m. Eastern time. Forty-six cars were entered for the race. All but two cars were entered in the previous week's race at Michigan. The only driver change for this race was the No. 33 Hillman-Circle Sport LLC Chevrolet which was driven by Mike Bliss.

No.	Driver	Team	Manufacturer
1	Jamie McMurray	Chip Ganassi Racing	Chevrolet
2	Brad Keselowski (PC3)	Team Penske	Ford
3	Austin Dillon	Richard Childress Racing	Chevrolet
4	Kevin Harvick (PC1)	Stewart–Haas Racing	Chevrolet
5	Kasey Kahne	Hendrick Motorsports	Chevrolet
6	Trevor Bayne	Roush Fenway Racing	Ford
7	Alex Bowman	Tommy Baldwin Racing	Chevrolet
9	Sam Hornish Jr.	Richard Petty Motorsports	Ford
10	Danica Patrick	Stewart–Haas Racing	Chevrolet
11	Denny Hamlin	Joe Gibbs Racing	Toyota
13	Casey Mears	Germain Racing	Chevrolet
14	Tony Stewart (PC4)	Stewart–Haas Racing	Chevrolet
15	Clint Bowyer	Michael Waltrip Racing	Toyota
16	Greg Biffle	Roush Fenway Racing	Ford
17	Ricky Stenhouse Jr.	Roush Fenway Racing	Ford
18	Kyle Busch	Joe Gibbs Racing	Toyota
19	Carl Edwards	Joe Gibbs Racing	Toyota
20	Matt Kenseth (PC6)	Joe Gibbs Racing	Toyota
21	Ryan Blaney (i)	Wood Brothers Racing	Ford
22	Joey Logano	Team Penske	Ford
23	J. J. Yeley (i)	BK Racing	Toyota
24	Jeff Gordon (PC7)	Hendrick Motorsports	Chevrolet
26	Jeb Burton (R)	BK Racing	Toyota
27	Paul Menard	Richard Childress Racing	Chevrolet
30	Travis Kvapil (i)	The Motorsports Group	Chevrolet
31	Ryan Newman	Richard Childress Racing	Chevrolet
32	Josh Wise	Go FAS Racing	Ford
33	Mike Bliss (i)	Hillman-Circle Sport LLC	Chevrolet
34	Brett Moffitt (R)	Front Row Motorsports	Ford
35	Cole Whitt	Front Row Motorsports	Ford
38	David Gilliland	Front Row Motorsports	Ford
40	Landon Cassill (i)	Hillman-Circle Sport LLC	Chevrolet
41	Kurt Busch (PC5)	Stewart–Haas Racing	Chevrolet
42	Kyle Larson	Chip Ganassi Racing	Chevrolet
43	Aric Almirola	Richard Petty Motorsports	Ford
46	Michael Annett	HScott Motorsports	Chevrolet
47	A. J. Allmendinger	JTG Daugherty Racing	Chevrolet
48	Jimmie Johnson (PC2)	Hendrick Motorsports	Chevrolet
51	Justin Allgaier	HScott Motorsports	Chevrolet
55	David Ragan	Michael Waltrip Racing	Toyota
62	Reed Sorenson	Premium Motorsports	Chevrolet
78	Martin Truex Jr.	Furniture Row Racing	Chevrolet
83	Matt DiBenedetto (R)	BK Racing	Toyota
88	Dale Earnhardt Jr.	Hendrick Motorsports	Chevrolet
95	Michael McDowell	Leavine Family Racing	Ford
98	Timmy Hill (i)	Premium Motorsports	Ford
Official initial entry list
Official final entry list

Key	Meaning
(R)	Rookie
(i)	Ineligible for points
(PC#)	Past champions provisional

== Practice ==
=== First practice ===
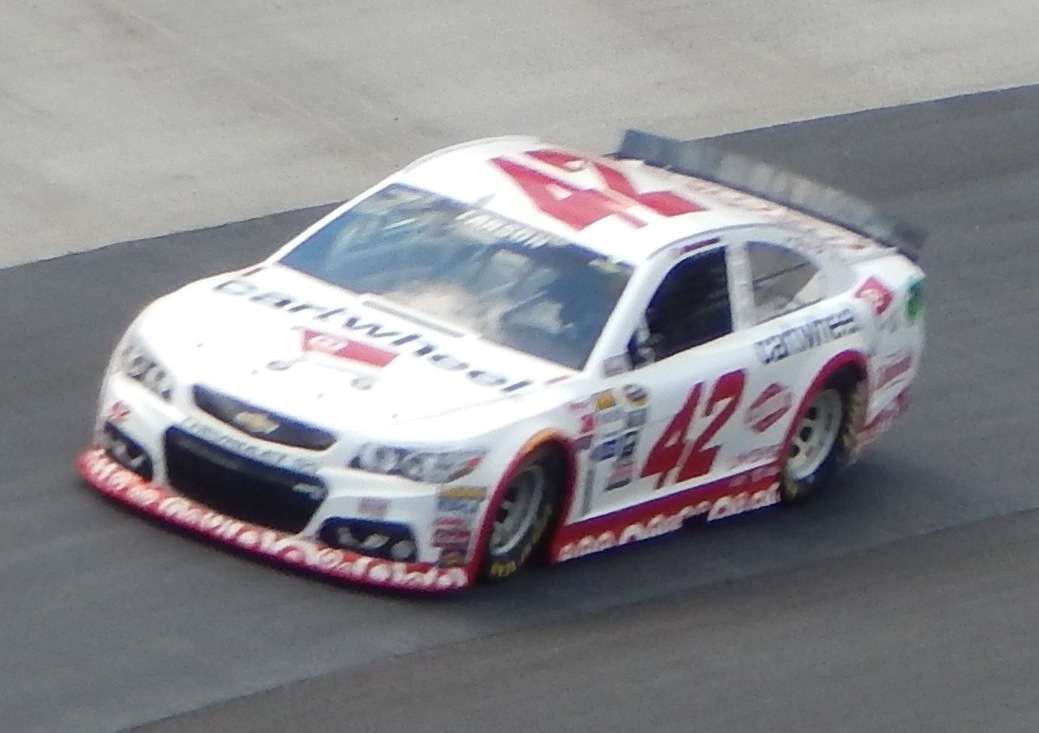
Kyle Larson was the fastest in the first practice session.

Kyle Larson was the fastest in the first practice session with a time of 14.779 and a speed of 129.833 mph (208.946 km/h). Towards the tail-end of the session, Martin Truex Jr. blew a right-front tire and slammed the wall exiting turn 2. The damage done to the left-front control arm forced him to switch to his backup car. Because this change took place prior to qualifying, he won't start the race from the rear of the field.

Pos	No.	Driver	Team	Manufacturer	Time	Speed
1	42	Kyle Larson	Chip Ganassi Racing	Chevrolet	14.779	129.833
2	20	Matt Kenseth	Joe Gibbs Racing	Toyota	14.921	128.597
3	18	Kyle Busch	Joe Gibbs Racing	Toyota	14.923	128.580
Official first practice results

=== Final practice ===
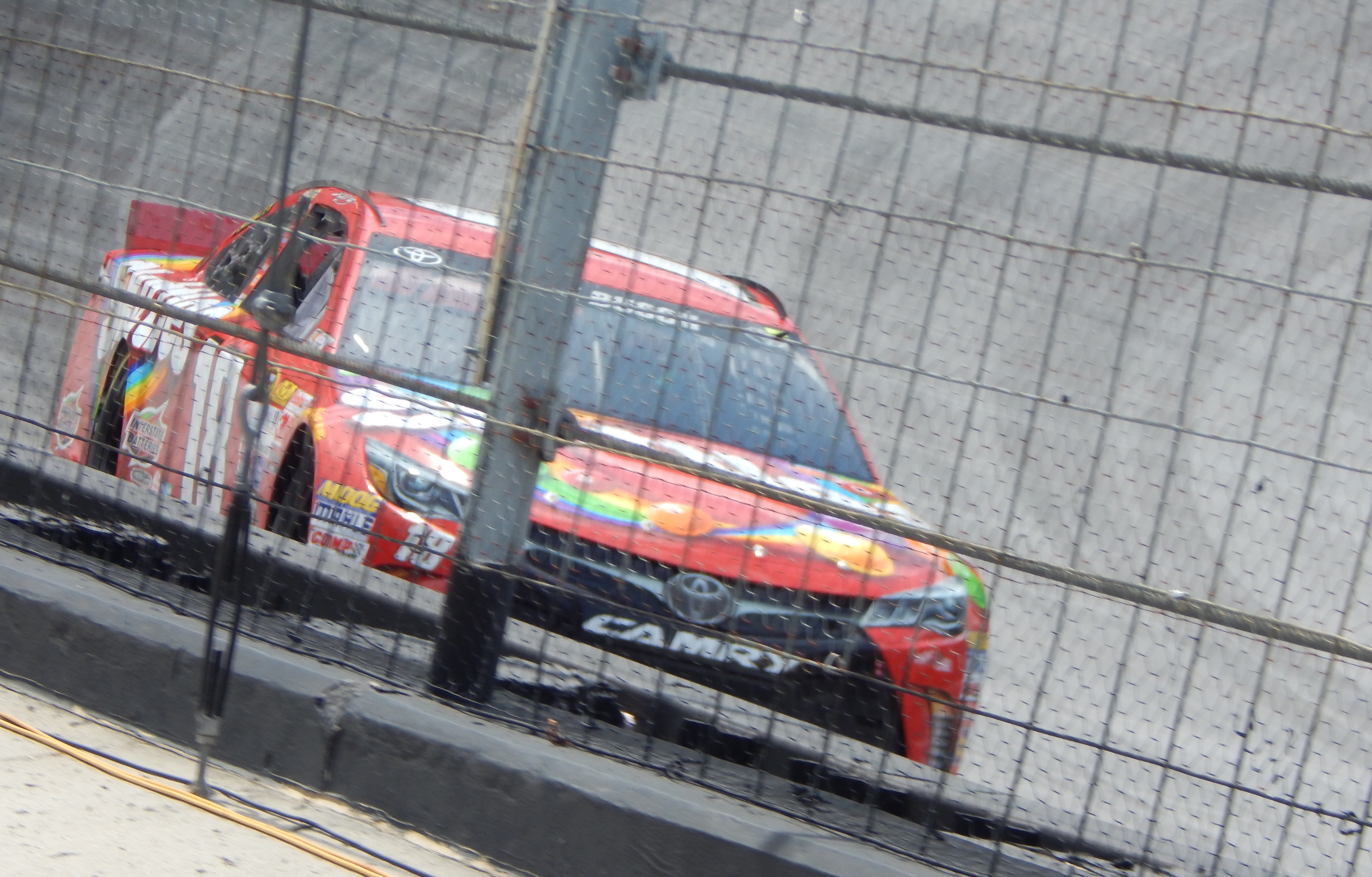
Kyle Busch was the fastest in the final practice session.

Kyle Busch was the fastest in the final practice session with a time of 14.631 and a speed of 131.146 mph (211.059 km/h).

Pos	No.	Driver	Team	Manufacturer	Time	Speed
1	18	Kyle Busch	Joe Gibbs Racing	Toyota	14.631	131.146
2	55	David Ragan	Michael Waltrip Racing	Toyota	14.687	130.646
3	42	Kyle Larson	Chip Ganassi Racing	Chevrolet	14.758	130.018
Official final practice results

== Qualifying ==
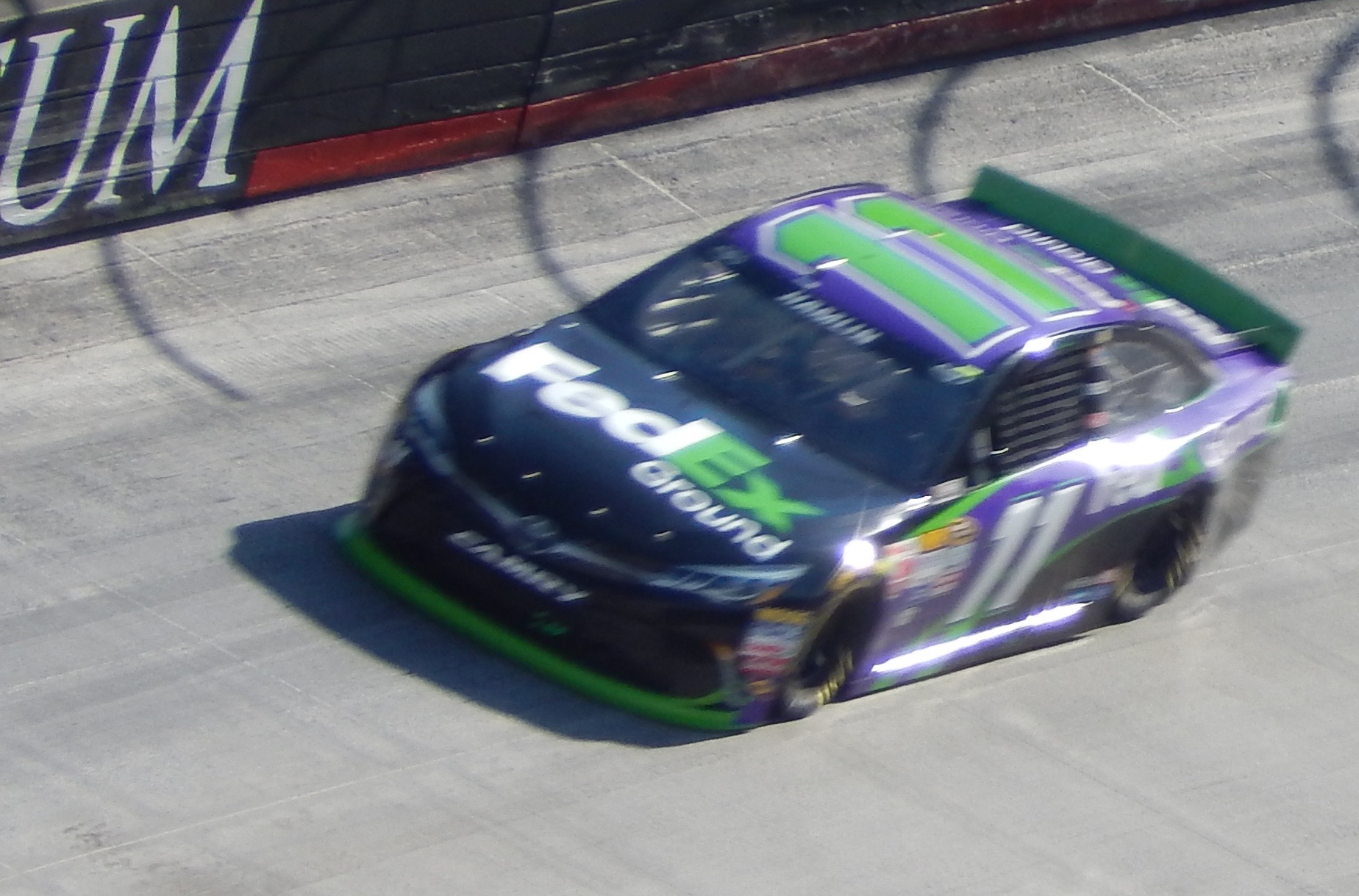
Denny Hamlin (pictured during qualifying) won the pole for the race.

Denny Hamlin won the pole with a new track record time of 14.602 and a speed of 131.407 mph (211.479 km/h). "Our FedEx Ground Camry obviously was very fast that last round and Dave (Rogers, crew chief) made the great adjustments to it to pick up the speed and I think that hopefully we’ll have something that we can race with them tomorrow night,” Hamlin said. “The first round just got loose and that kind of put us behind the whole time," Kevin Harvick said after qualifying seventh. "Other than that the car drove pretty good, really throughout every round. Had a little bit of trouble with all the engine stuff shutting off at the end of the straightaway so that was definitely hurting us." “All of our cars have had good speed today, we just missed the setup there a little bit for qualifying and couldn’t really fix it from the pit box," said Matt Kenseth after qualifying 13th. "We got the best lap we could out of it – wish we could have made it to the last round there. Just didn’t quite have enough in it.” "We didn’t qualify very good here the last time we were here and heck, I think this time we were worse than we were the last time," Jeff Gordon said after qualifying 24th for his final start at Bristol. "But we raced really good. I thought our race runs looked decent today. It’s hard to pass. The groove is up top there, so I was hoping we were going to qualify better than this, especially with this pretty awesome Rainbow paint scheme that Axalta has this weekend for us. But, it just wasn’t meant to be. I don’t know. We were just really struggling when we put it into qualifying trim.” Jeb Burton, Travis Kvapil and Reed Sorenson failed to qualify for the race.

=== Qualifying results ===
Pos	No.	Driver	Team	Manufacturer	R1	R2	R3
1	11	Denny Hamlin	Joe Gibbs Racing	Toyota	14.760	14.764	14.602
2	18	Kyle Busch	Joe Gibbs Racing	Toyota	14.679	14.682	14.618
3	19	Carl Edwards	Joe Gibbs Racing	Toyota	14.849	14.742	14.686
4	55	David Ragan	Michael Waltrip Racing	Toyota	14.682	14.788	14.708
5	22	Joey Logano	Team Penske	Ford	14.897	14.780	14.721
6	2	Brad Keselowski	Team Penske	Ford	14.773	14.781	14.723
7	4	Kevin Harvick	Stewart–Haas Racing	Chevrolet	14.864	14.770	14.726
8	17	Ricky Stenhouse Jr.	Roush Fenway Racing	Ford	14.831	14.781	14.746
9	15	Clint Bowyer	Michael Waltrip Racing	Toyota	14.806	14.778	14.754
10	48	Jimmie Johnson	Hendrick Motorsports	Chevrolet	14.759	14.724	14.766
11	41	Kurt Busch	Stewart–Haas Racing	Chevrolet	14.745	14.641	14.823
12	42	Kyle Larson	Chip Ganassi Racing	Chevrolet	14.880	14.770	14.892
13	20	Matt Kenseth	Joe Gibbs Racing	Toyota	14.859	14.797	—
14	51	Justin Allgaier	HScott Motorsports	Chevrolet	14.885	14.834	—
15	21	Ryan Blaney (i)	Wood Brothers Racing	Ford	14.870	14.850	—
16	3	Austin Dillon	Richard Childress Racing	Chevrolet	14.877	14.857	—
17	16	Greg Biffle	Roush Fenway Racing	Ford	14.919	14.895	—
18	31	Ryan Newman	Richard Childress Racing	Chevrolet	14.865	14.909	—
19	5	Kasey Kahne	Hendrick Motorsports	Chevrolet	14.899	14.920	—
20	88	Dale Earnhardt Jr.	Hendrick Motorsports	Chevrolet	14.899	14.928	—
21	1	Jamie McMurray	Chip Ganassi Racing	Chevrolet	14.897	14.960	—
22	6	Trevor Bayne	Roush Fenway Racing	Ford	14.921	14.968	—
23	78	Martin Truex Jr.	Furniture Row Racing	Chevrolet	14.902	14.972	—
24	24	Jeff Gordon	Hendrick Motorsports	Chevrolet	14.910	14.992	—
25	47	A. J. Allmendinger	JTG Daugherty Racing	Chevrolet	14.925	—	—
26	9	Sam Hornish Jr.	Richard Petty Motorsports	Ford	14.961	—	—
27	34	Brett Moffitt (R)	Front Row Motorsports	Ford	14.970	—	—
28	13	Casey Mears	Germain Racing	Chevrolet	15.000	—	—
29	27	Paul Menard	Richard Childress Racing	Chevrolet	15.014	—	—
30	95	Michael McDowell	Leavine Family Racing	Ford	15.037	—	—
31	43	Aric Almirola	Richard Petty Motorsports	Ford	15.042	—	—
32	10	Danica Patrick	Stewart–Haas Racing	Chevrolet	15.045	—	—
33	35	Cole Whitt	Front Row Motorsports	Ford	15.054	—	—
34	32	Josh Wise	Go FAS Racing	Ford	15.065	—	—
35	46	Michael Annett	HScott Motorsports	Chevrolet	15.080	—	—
36	7	Alex Bowman	Tommy Baldwin Racing	Chevrolet	15.084	—	—
37	38	David Gilliland	Front Row Motorsports	Ford	15.113	—	—
38	23	J. J. Yeley (i)	BK Racing	Toyota	15.130	—	—
39	40	Landon Cassill (i)	Hillman-Circle Sport LLC	Chevrolet	15.151	—	—
40	14	Tony Stewart	Stewart–Haas Racing	Chevrolet	15.161	—	—
41	98	Timmy Hill (i)	Premium Motorsports	Ford	15.221	—	—
42	83	Matt DiBenedetto (R)	BK Racing	Toyota	15.278	—	—
43	33	Mike Bliss (i)	Hillman-Circle Sport LLC	Chevrolet	15.293	—	—
Failed to qualify
44	30	Travis Kvapil (i)	The Motorsports Group	Chevrolet	15.163	—	—
45	26	Jeb Burton (R)	BK Racing	Toyota	15.240	—	—
46	62	Reed Sorenson	Premium Motorsports	Chevrolet	15.332	—	—
Official qualifying results

== Race ==
=== First half ===
==== Start ====
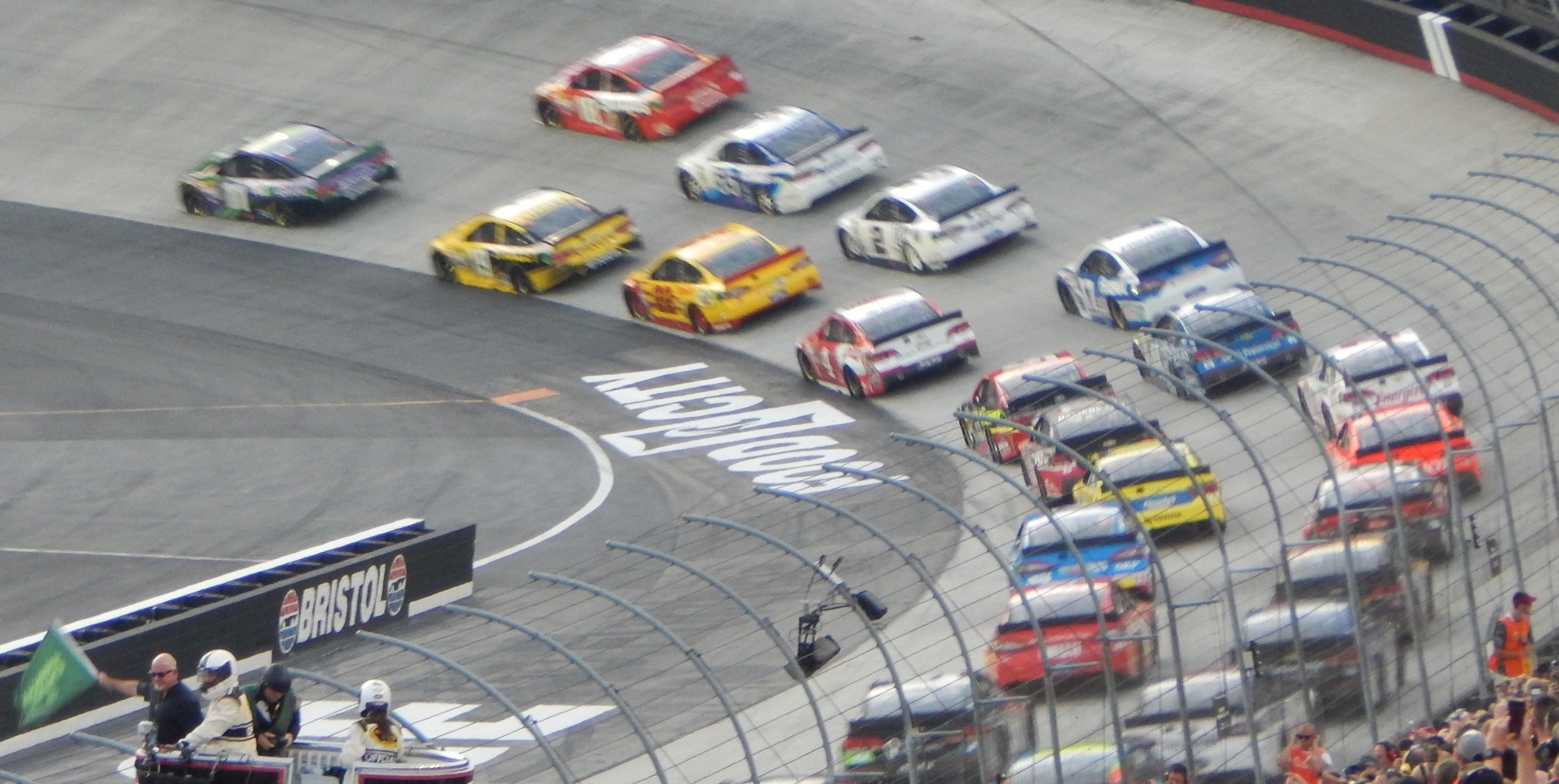
Denny Hamlin led the field to the green flag.

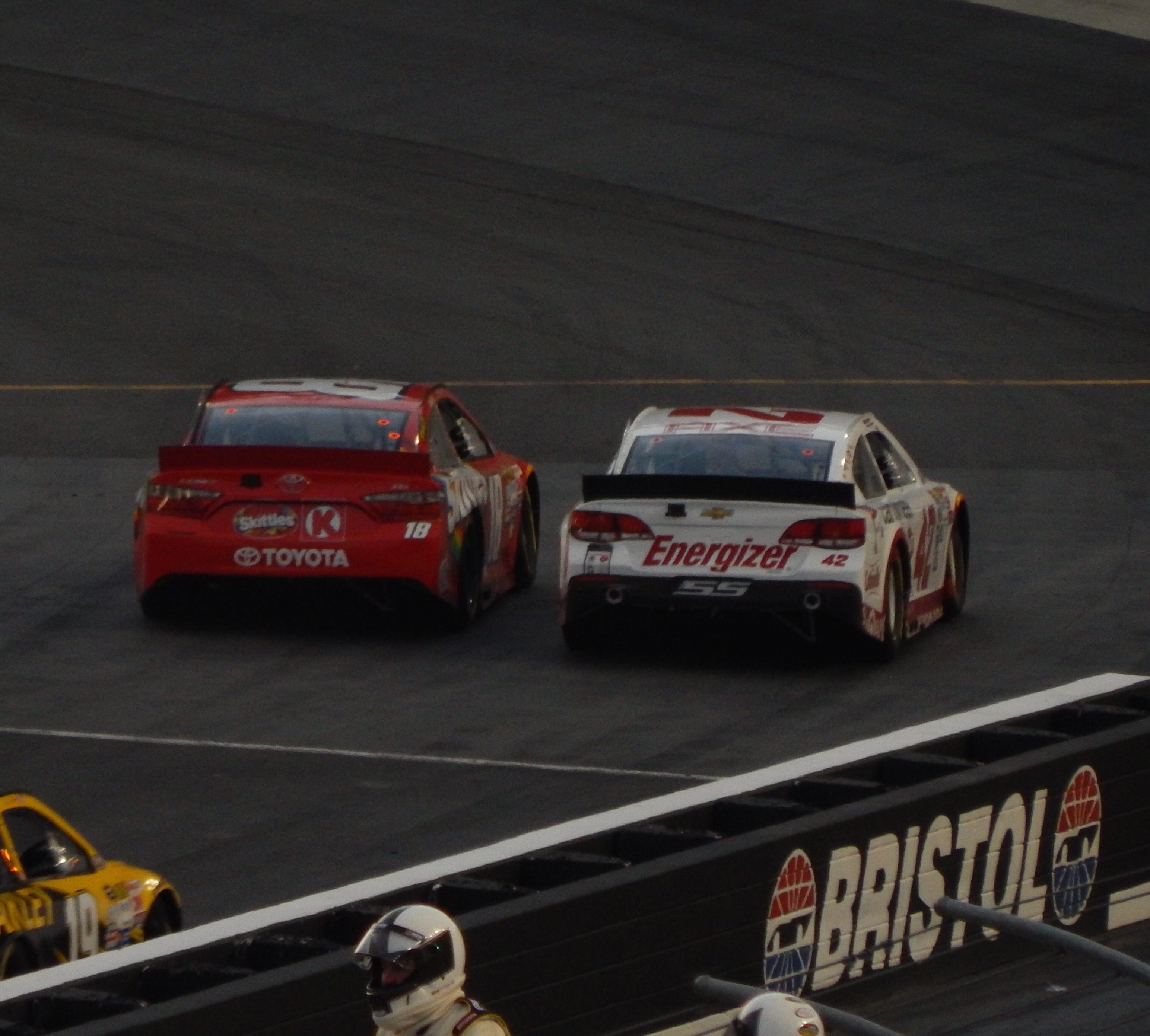
Kyle Busch exited pit road with the race lead under the first caution.

Under a clear East Tennessee evening sky, Denny Hamlin led the field to the green flag at 7:52 p.m. Starting on the bottom line, which isn't the norm at Bristol, he shot ahead of teammate Kyle Busch to lead the first lap. By lap 15, Hamlin caught the tail-end of the field and completed the short track conveyor belt. By lap 18, Busch ran down his teammate and pressured him for the lead. Eventually, the No. 18 Toyota used the lap traffic to pass the No. 11 and take the lead on lap 28. The lapped traffic allowed Kyle to pull away from Denny in the ensuing laps. A. J. Allmendinger bumped Paul Menard in turn 3 and about sent the No. 27 car spinning in front of the race leader, but he saved his car and the race continued. Debris in turn 3 brought out the first caution of the race on lap 52. Kyle Busch and Denny Hamlin swapped the lead on pit road with the former pitting on the backstretch. It was ultimately Busch whom exited pit road with the lead. Ryan Blaney and Danica Patrick were tagged for speeding on pit road and restarted the race from the rear of the field.

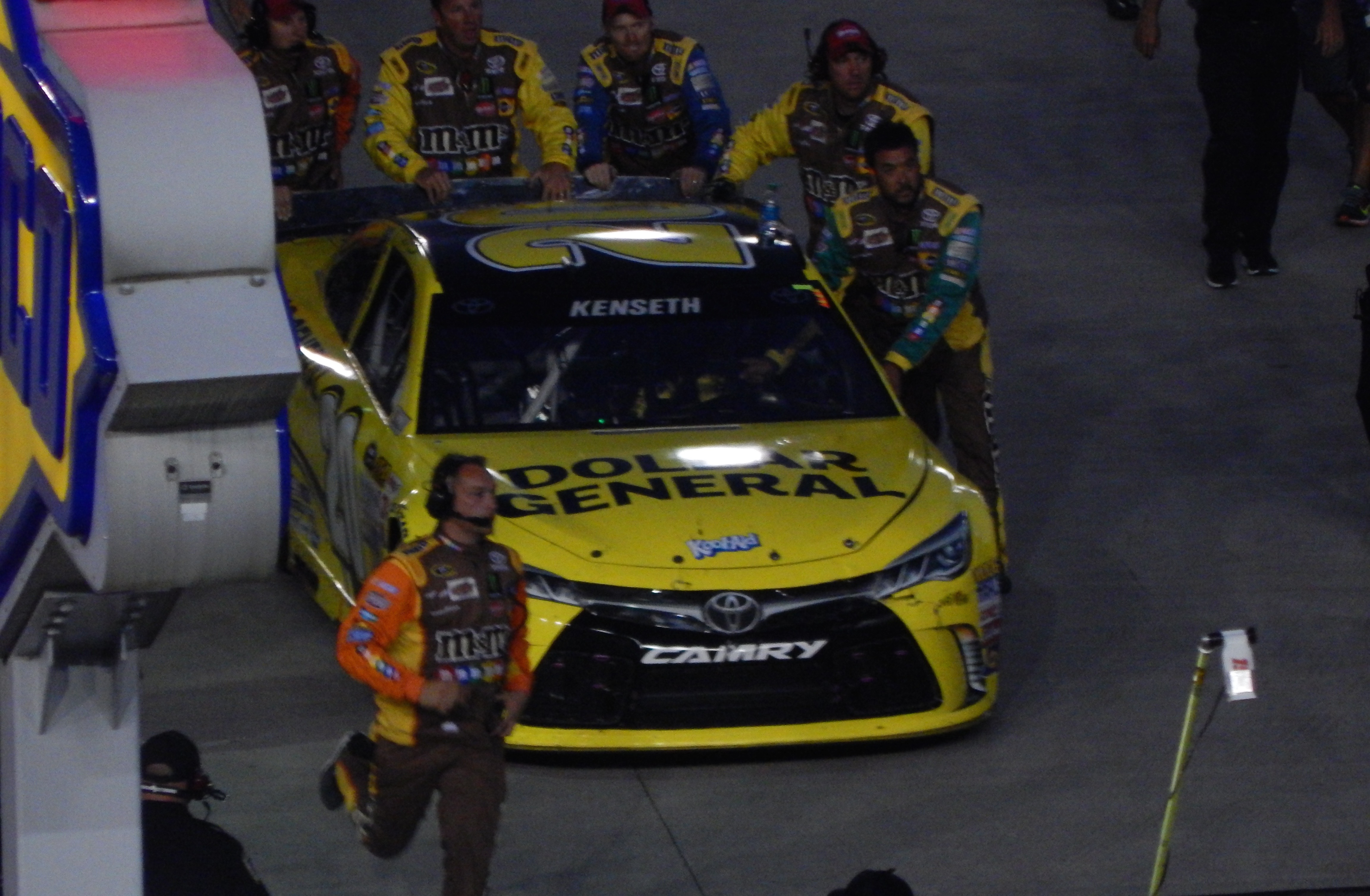
Matt Kenseth's day came to an end after losing an engine on lap 111.

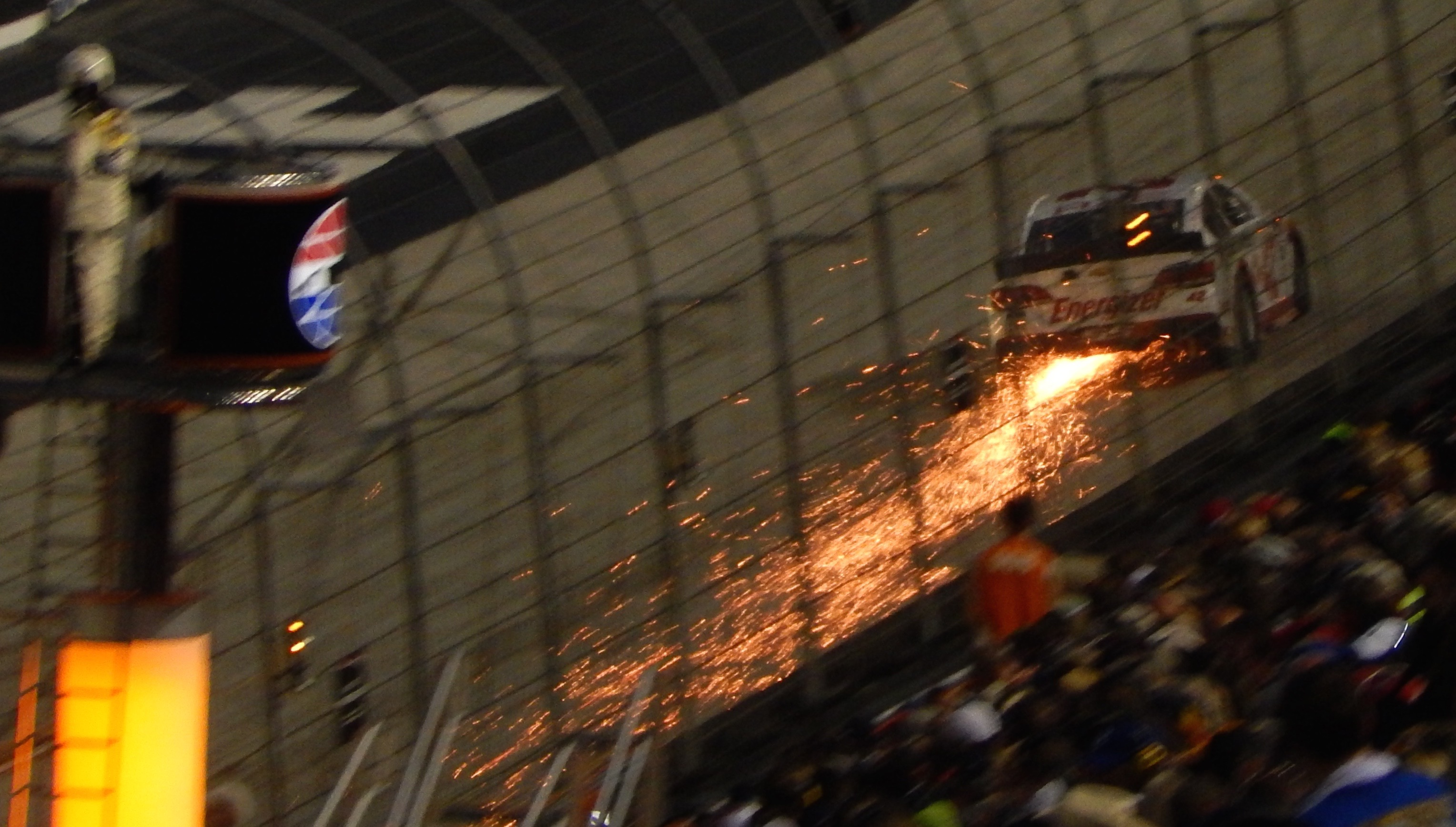
Kyle Larson slammed the wall in turn 3 on lap 126 after cutting down his left-front tire.

The race restarted on lap 58. He shot ahead of Kyle Larson on the outside line and drove away from the field followed closely by teammate Denny Hamlin. He too was caught off by lapped traffic and Busch drove away. Matt Kenseth was running fourth when he blew his engine on lap 111. “It broke in the middle of the straightaway – it had that hop and that noise that it makes when you know you dropped a valve,” Kenseth explained. “Unfortunate, but man these guys at TRD (Toyota Racing Development) have been doing such an awesome job, we’ve had so much power and everything has been really reliable here the last year and a half. Things like this happen every once in a while. It’s a short night. Felt like we were really competitive – we were one or two adjustments away from where we needed to be, but I thought our Dollar General Camry had good speed.” The second caution of the race flew on lap 126 for a single-car wreck in turn 4. Exiting turn 2, Kyle Larson – who changed just right-side tires under the first caution – cut down his left-front tire and slammed the wall in turn 3. Kyle Busch and Denny Hamlin swapped the lead on pit road pitting on opposite pit roads. This time, it was Hamlin who beat his teammate off pit road. Kevin Harvick was tagged for his crew being over the wall too soon and restarted the race from the rear of the field.

==== Second quarter ====
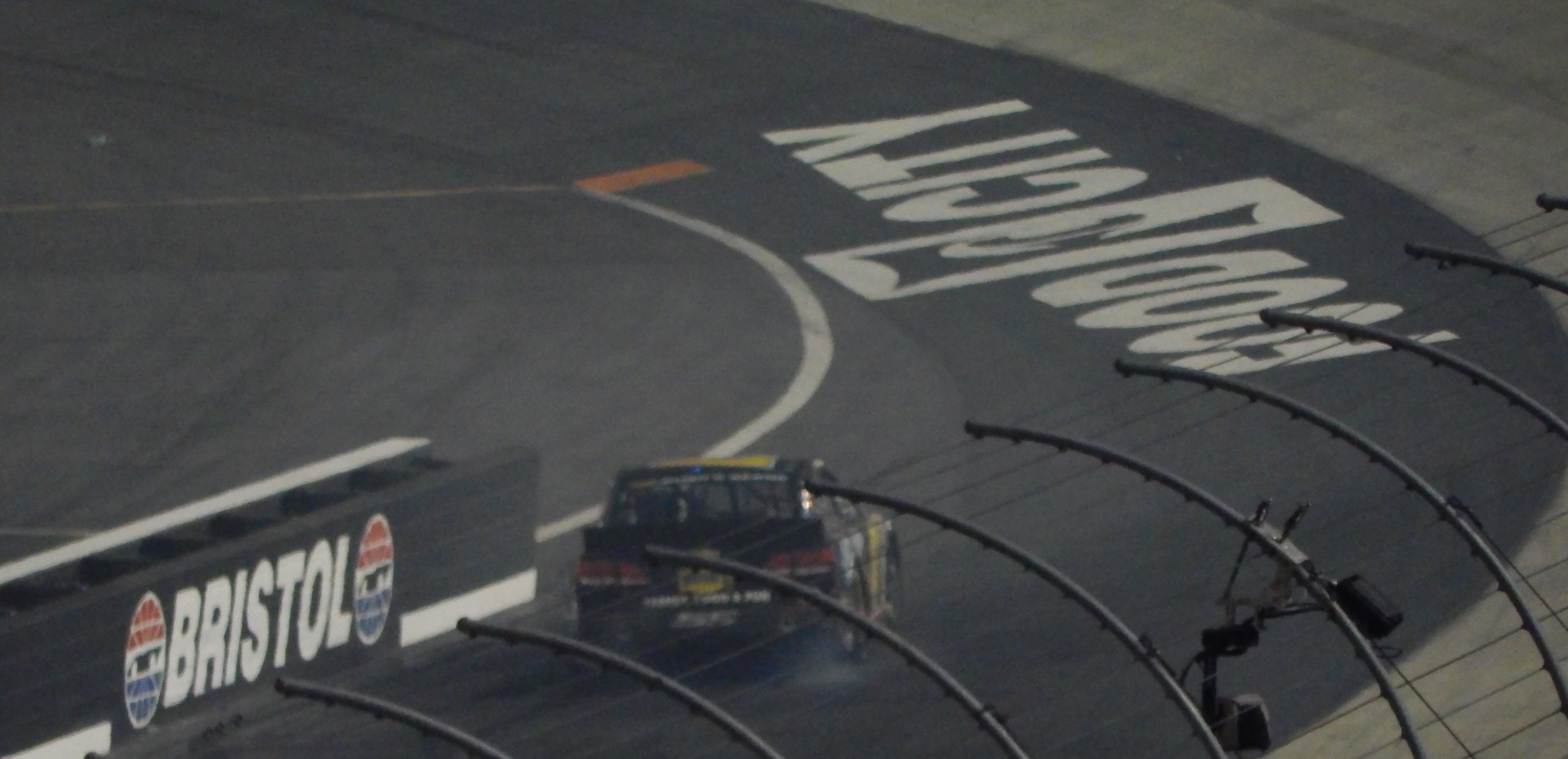
A. J. Allmendinger crashed out of the race on lap 146.

The race restarted on lap 133. Again deviating from recent Bristol norm, Denny Hamlin restarted on the bottom line and shot ahead of his teammate. The third caution of the race flew on lap 146 for a single-car wreck on the front stretch. Exiting turn 2, A. J. Allmendinger came down across the nose of Ricky Stenhouse Jr., slid down the track and slammed the inside wall.

The race restarted on lap 152. Teammate Kyle Busch drove by Denny Hamlin on the top side to take back the lead on lap 156. Hamlin pulled back up to him in the next eight laps, but was unable to get by him. Eventually, Busch began to pull away from the rest of the lead cars. Being caught being the lapped car of Josh Wise allowed Joey Logano to drive up to his outside, but pulled out in front and continued leading. Logano powered underneath Busch after he made slight contact with the wall to take the lead on lap 226. Debris in turn 3 brought out the fourth caution of the race on lap 250. Carl Edwards exited pit road with the lead. Justin Allgaier was tagged for speeding on pit road and restarted the race from the rear of the field.

=== Second half ===
==== Halfway ====
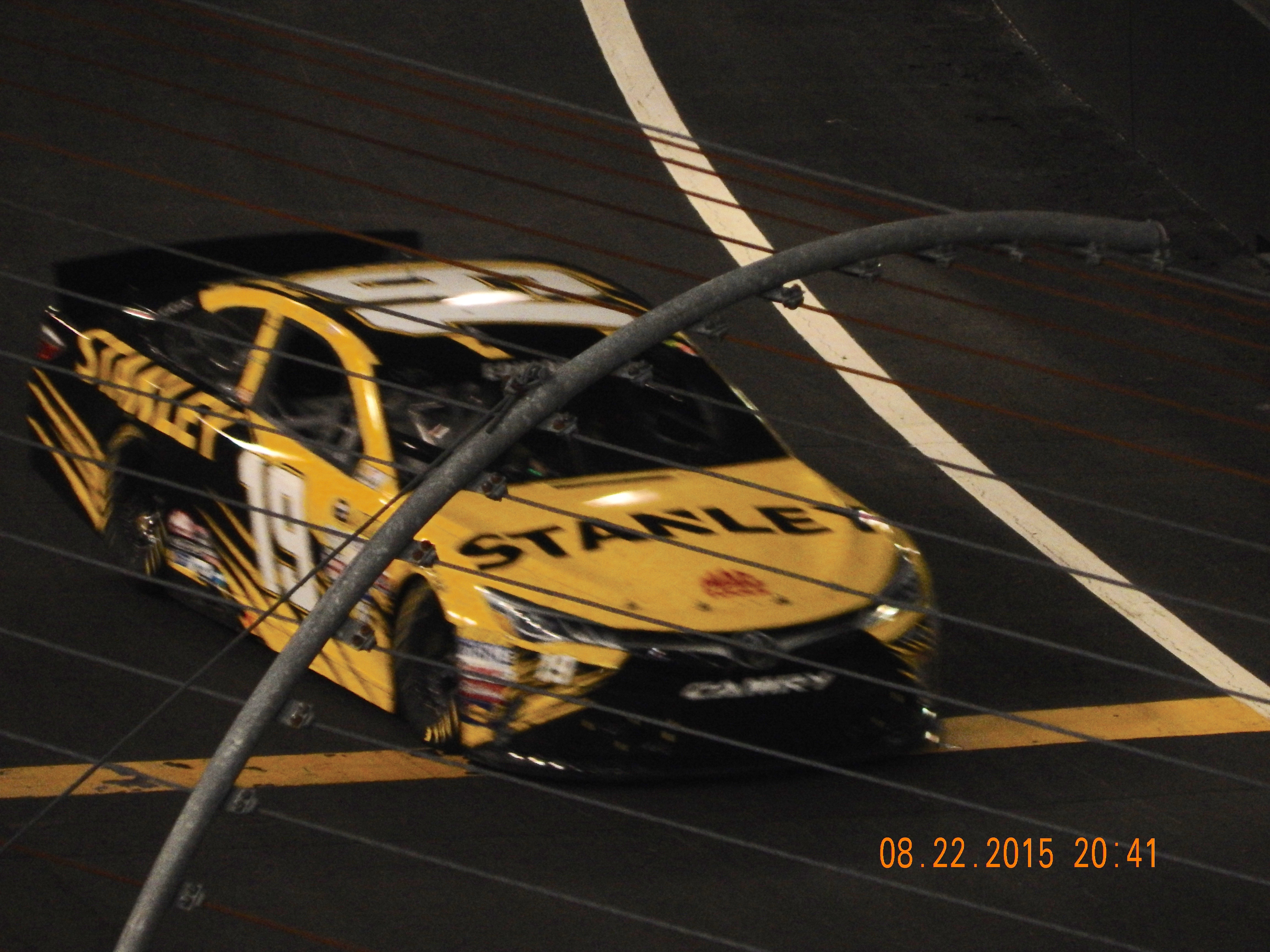
Carl Edwards made an unscheduled stop from the lead on lap 352 for a flat tire.

The race restarted on lap 258. Kyle Busch drove outside teammate Edwards to retake the lead on lap 282. Unfortunately, he was unable to build a gap as he was caught in heavy lap traffic. Carl reeled in Kyle to drive by him and take the lead on lap 304. He pulled to a one-second lead over Joey Logano. As is normal for Bristol, the lapped traffic slowed him down enough to allow Logano to reel in Edwards. David Ragan made contact with Kurt Busch and sent him into the turn 1 wall. Kyle Busch was running third when he made an unscheduled stop on lap 344. Logano ducked underneath Edwards and used the lapped car of Dale Earnhardt Jr. as a pick to take the lead on lap 347. The lapped traffic allowed Carl to return the favor and retake the lead on lap 352. He cut down a tire, hit pit road from the lead and handed it back to Joey Logano. The fifth caution of the race flew on lap 359 for a single-car wreck on the front stretch. Exiting turn 4, Kyle Larson cut down his right-front tire and slammed the wall hard in turn 4. Kevin Harvick was tagged for speeding on pit road and restarted the race from the rear of the field.

The race restarted on lap 368. The sixth caution of the race flew with 130 laps to go for a single-spin on the backstretch. In a classic Bristol accordion effect exiting turn 2, Jimmie Johnson got loose, came down on David Ragan, got turned by Clint Bowyer, sent spinning down the track and slammed the inside wall. "The 48 (Johnson) jumped on my outside and we were really good on the bottom and it kind of surprised me by getting out there and he held me tight coming off of Turn 2 and then I guess the 15 (Bowyer) got a little bit of a run and there just wasn’t enough room for the three of us," Ragan said after the race. "That's the way things happen at Bristol sometimes. It's unfortunate. Our Aaron's Dream Machine was really fast and we had a chance to win. It's uncalled for to get wrecked and to be involved in a wreck like that but all in all just one of those racing things." "You hate to have that good of a car -- have two good cars and the last person you want to get into and have trouble with is your teammate," Bowyer said after the race. "I'm sick to death about that. We had two top-five cars and MWR really needed that run. With that being said we desperately needed a solid run right there. I mean obviously you're hungry for a win with this organization given everything it had and I drove my ass off we just come up short."

==== Fourth quarter ====
The race restarted with 121 laps to go. The seventh caution of the race flew with 117 laps to go for a single-car wreck on the front stretch. Exiting turn 4, Ricky Stenhouse Jr. got loose, overcorrected, hit Martin Truex Jr. and hit the outside wall. Greg Biffle was tagged for speeding on pit road and restarted the race from the rear of the field.

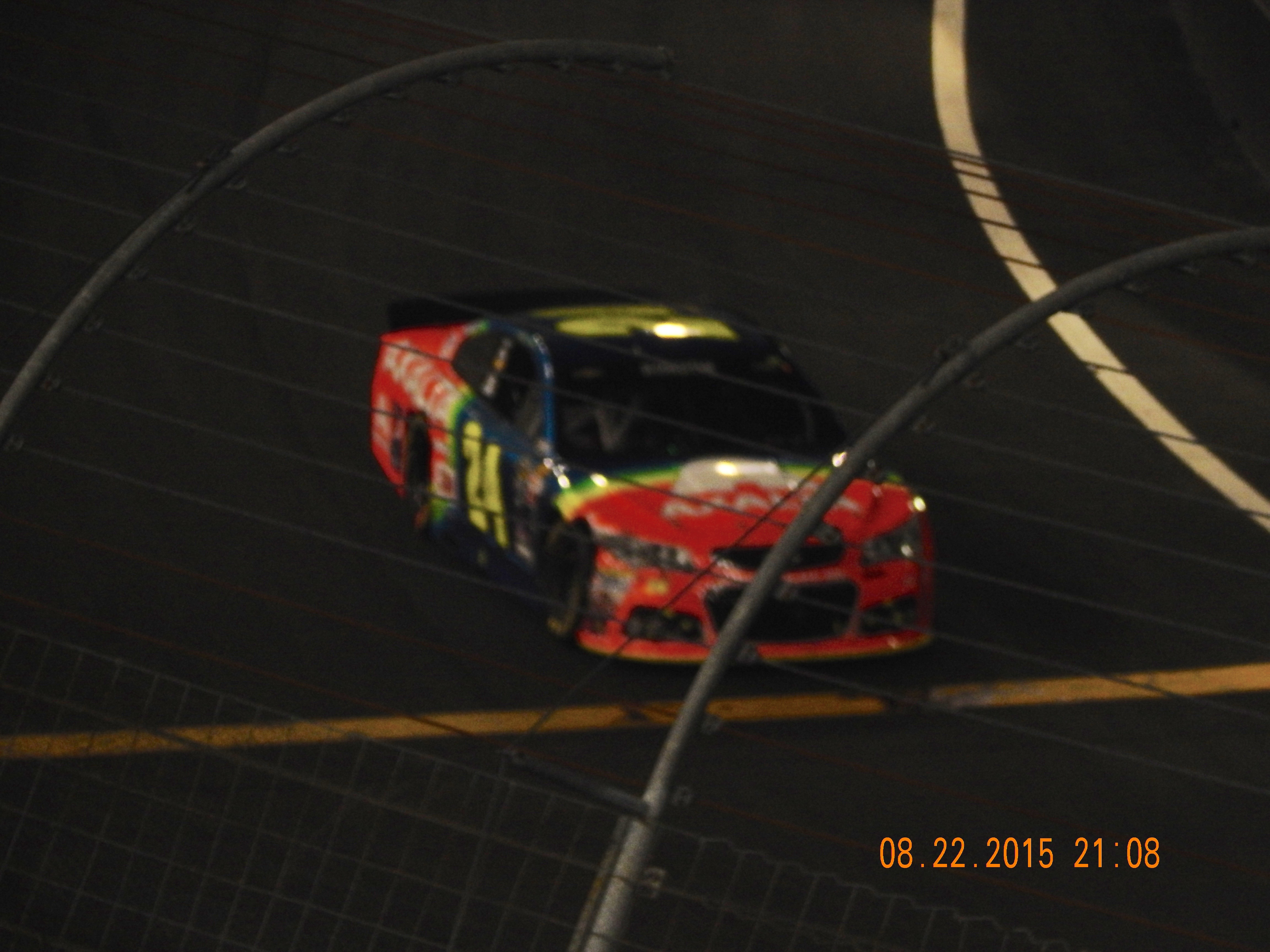
Jeff Gordon's drive for a sixth career victory at Bristol Motor Speedway came to an end with 93 laps to go for a loose wheel.

The race restarted with 110 laps to go. Jeff Gordon was running fifth when he made an unscheduled stop for a loose wheel with 93 laps to go. Debris on the backstretch brought out the eighth caution of the race with 71 laps to go. Brad Keselowski opted not to pit under the caution and assumed the lead. Kyle Busch was tagged for speeding on the pit road and restarted the race from the rear of the field. “It’s frustrating,” Adam Stevens said. “We put another car on the track that’s capable of winning and it’s tough to do. We’ve been able to do it I don’t know how many weeks in a row. We had a race-winning car at Watkins Glen and Pocono and just keep coming up short. This one’s on us. We made a mistake at Pocono, we weren’t aggressive enough at Watkins Glen and now just make a mistake on pit road. We had a loose wheel and we battled back from that and then you speed on the last stop – you can’t win if you speed on the last stop. That’s all there is to it. (NASCAR) told us that we were speeding in section five – our pit box is in section five. You can’t speed if you’re stopped on pit road. Maybe they meant to say a different number, I don’t know. But there is no earthly way that you can speed in the segment that your pit stall is in, it’s not possible.”

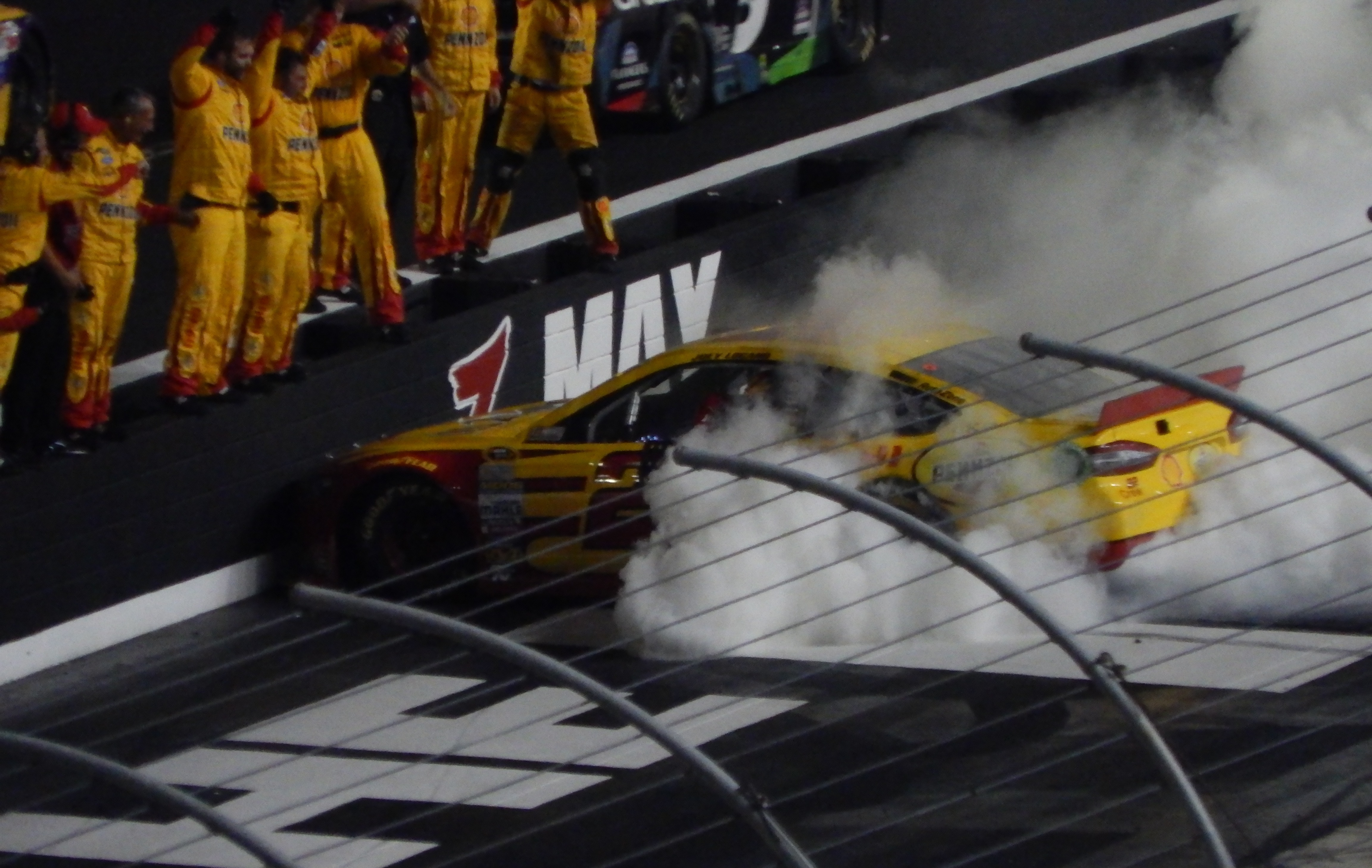
Joey Logano celebrates winning the Irwin Tools Night Race.

The race restarted with 63 laps to go. Joey Logano shot ahead of his teammate to retake the lead. For the final 50 laps, he and Kevin Harvick dueled with one another for the top spot. While Logano was running the bottom line to get away, Harvick continued to ride around the top lane of the track to reel in Logano. Joey began to pull away with 25 laps remaining. However, he began dealing with lapped traffic again in the final 20 laps. It was this lapped traffic that allowed Kevin to reel the lead back to him with 12 laps left in the race. He finally pulled to within a car-length of Logano with four laps to go. Kevin Harvick was unable to catch Joey Logano on the final lap as he went on to score the victory at Bristol.

== Post-race ==
=== Driver comments ===
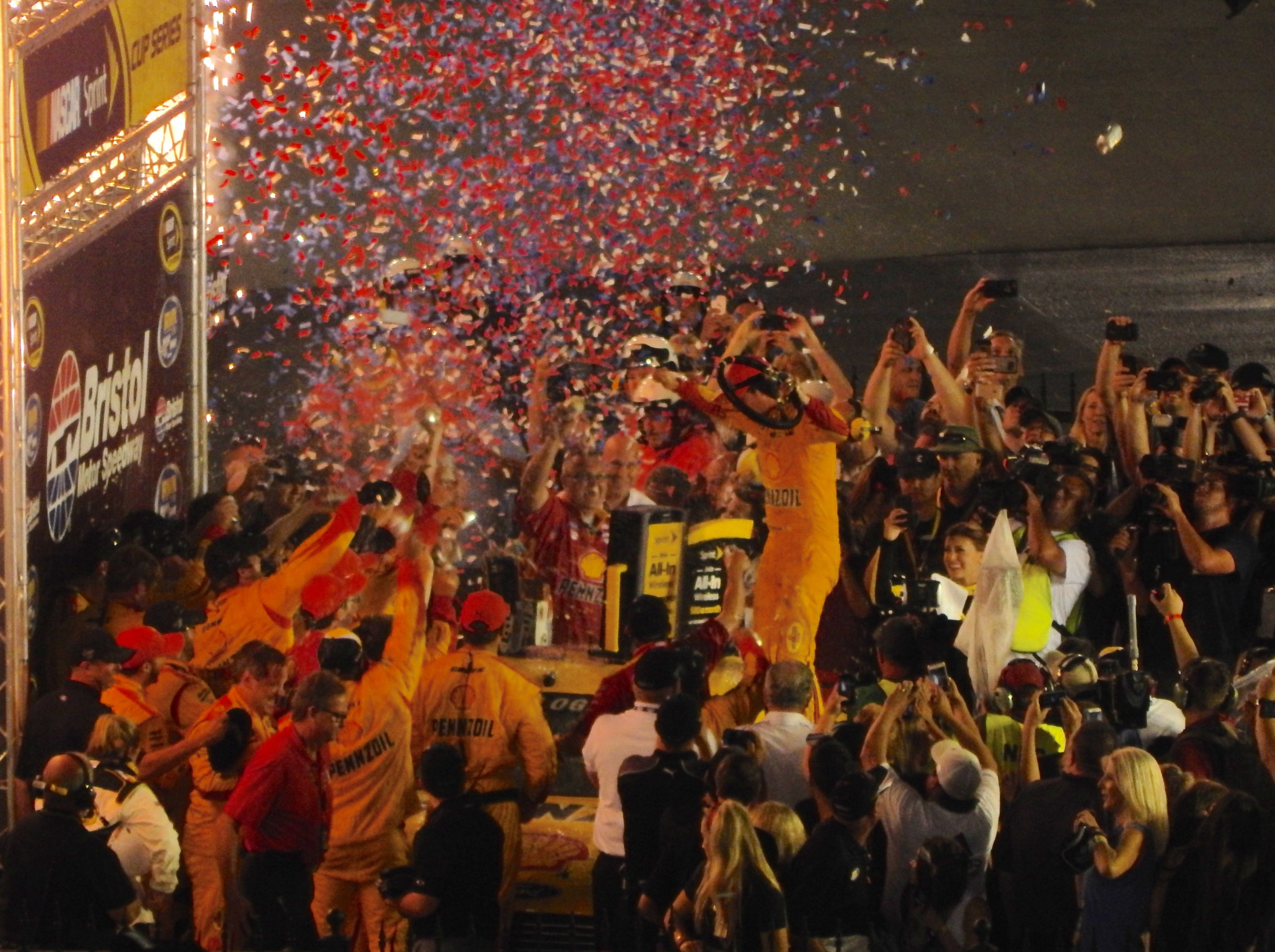
Joey Logano celebrates in victory lane.

“It was kind of interesting to watch it in the mirror,” Logano said of Harvick trying to pass him in the closing laps. “I was watching him drive in and I was like, ‘He’s going to get me eventually,’ so I just wanted to make sure I stayed at least three or four car lengths up on him so he didn't get to me.”

"He was just one step ahead of me in traffic,” Harvick explained after finishing runner-up for the 10th time this season. “I couldn't get my car to rotate across the center like I needed it to, and every time I tried to force it would snap the back out. He was able to go in really high and before the center of the corner drive down the corner and I was just having to wait just a split second to be able to put the throttle back down, and I couldn't do that, that huge diamond all the way to the bottom like he could, and that was really beneficial for him through traffic, and I kind of had to just part throttle it through the center and grind the tires away through the center to the corner and just hope that they were going to lift, but he was able to get those huge runs up off the exit of the corner and just stayed one step ahead of me through traffic I felt like, and in clean air we probably were a little faster, but it didn't really matter. I had to be in front of him to show that. All in all, he was just one step ahead of me in traffic.”

After finishing fifth, Bowyer said the result was important for the team following a difficult weekend at Michigan. He stated that the performance helped rebuild confidence and momentum ahead of the Chase, where the team hoped to remain competitive and advance through multiple rounds.

== Race results ==
Pos	No.	Driver	Team	Manufacturer	Laps	Points
1	22	Joey Logano	Team Penske	Ford	500	47
2	4	Kevin Harvick	Stewart–Haas Racing	Chevrolet	500	42
3	11	Denny Hamlin	Joe Gibbs Racing	Toyota	500	42
4	48	Jimmie Johnson	Hendrick Motorsports	Chevrolet	500	40
5	15	Clint Bowyer	Michael Waltrip Racing	Toyota	500	39
6	2	Brad Keselowski	Team Penske	Ford	500	39
7	19	Carl Edwards	Joe Gibbs Racing	Toyota	500	38
8	18	Kyle Busch	Joe Gibbs Racing	Toyota	500	38
9	88	Dale Earnhardt Jr.	Hendrick Motorsports	Chevrolet	500	35
10	31	Ryan Newman	Richard Childress Racing	Chevrolet	500	34
11	1	Jamie McMurray	Chip Ganassi Racing	Chevrolet	500	33
12	51	Justin Allgaier	HScott Motorsports	Chevrolet	500	32
13	3	Austin Dillon	Richard Childress Racing	Chevrolet	500	31
14	41	Kurt Busch	Stewart–Haas Racing	Chevrolet	499	30
15	6	Trevor Bayne	Roush Fenway Racing	Ford	498	29
16	5	Kasey Kahne	Hendrick Motorsports	Chevrolet	498	28
17	43	Aric Almirola	Richard Petty Motorsports	Ford	497	27
18	9	Sam Hornish Jr.	Richard Petty Motorsports	Ford	497	26
19	14	Tony Stewart	Stewart–Haas Racing	Chevrolet	497	25
20	24	Jeff Gordon	Hendrick Motorsports	Chevrolet	496	24
21	17	Ricky Stenhouse Jr.	Roush Fenway Racing	Ford	496	23
22	21	Ryan Blaney (i)	Wood Brothers Racing	Ford	496	0
23	13	Casey Mears	Germain Racing	Chevrolet	496	21
24	27	Paul Menard	Richard Childress Racing	Chevrolet	496	20
25	16	Greg Biffle	Roush Fenway Racing	Ford	496	19
26	47	A. J. Allmendinger	JTG Daugherty Racing	Chevrolet	495	18
27	10	Danica Patrick	Stewart–Haas Racing	Chevrolet	495	17
28	78	Martin Truex Jr.	Furniture Row Racing	Chevrolet	495	16
29	35	Cole Whitt	Front Row Motorsports	Ford	495	15
30	34	Brett Moffitt (R)	Front Row Motorsports	Ford	495	14
31	95	Michael McDowell	Leavine Family Racing	Ford	495	13
32	7	Alex Bowman	Tommy Baldwin Racing	Chevrolet	494	12
33	83	Matt DiBenedetto (R)	BK Racing	Toyota	493	11
34	23	J. J. Yeley (i)	BK Racing	Toyota	492	0
35	32	Josh Wise	Go FAS Racing	Ford	491	9
36	38	David Gilliland	Front Row Motorsports	Ford	488	8
37	33	Mike Bliss (i)	Hillman-Circle Sport LLC	Chevrolet	486	0
38	40	Landon Cassill (i)	Hillman-Circle Sport LLC	Chevrolet	480	0
39	98	Timmy Hill (i)	Premium Motorsports	Ford	476	0
40	55	David Ragan	Michael Waltrip Racing	Toyota	443	4
41	42	Kyle Larson	Chip Ganassi Racing	Chevrolet	356	3
42	20	Matt Kenseth	Joe Gibbs Racing	Toyota	110	2
43	46	Michael Annett	HScott Motorsports	Chevrolet	0	1
Official Irwin Tools Night Race results

=== Race statistics ===
- 14 lead changes among 5 different drivers
- 8 cautions for 52 laps
- Time of race: 2 hours, 45 minute, 2 seconds
- Average speed: 96.890 mph (155.929 km/h)
- Joey Logano took home $365,198 in winnings

Lap Leaders
Laps	Leader
1-26	Denny Hamlin
27-52	Kyle Busch
53	Denny Hamlin
54-127	Kyle Busch
128-154	Denny Hamlin
155-224	Kyle Busch
225-252	Joey Logano
253-280	Carl Edwards
281-302	Kyle Busch
303-345	Carl Edwards
346-350	Joey Logano
351-353	Carl Edwards
354-432	Joey Logano
433-436	Brad Keselowski
437-500	Joey Logano

Total laps led
Leader	Laps
Kyle Busch	192
Joey Logano	176
Carl Edwards	74
Denny Hamlin	54
Brad Keselowski	4

==== Race awards ====
- Coors Light Pole Award: Denny Hamlin (14.602, 131.407 mph (211.479 km/h))
- 3M Lap Leader: Kyle Busch (192 laps)
- American Ethanol Green Flag Restart Award: Joey Logano
- Duralast Brakes "Bake In The Race" Award: Kyle Busch
- Freescale "Wide Open": Kevin Harvick
- Ingersoll Rand Power Move: Aric Almirola (2 positions)
- MAHLE Clevite Engine Builder of the Race: Toyota Racing Development #11
- Mobil 1 Driver of the Race: Joey Logano (137.8 driver rating)
- Moog Steering and Suspension Problem Solver of The Race: Dale Earnhardt Jr. (crew chief Greg Ives (0.123 seconds))
- NASCAR Sprint Cup Leader Bonus: No winner: rolls over to $210,000 at next event
- Sherwin-Williams Fastest Lap: Kyle Busch (Lap 59, 15.293, 125.469 mph (201.923 km/h))
- Sunoco Rookie of The Race: Brett Moffitt

== Media ==
=== Television ===
NBC Sports covered the race on the television side. Rick Allen, one–time Bristol winner Jeff Burton and Steve Letarte had the call in the booth for the race. Dave Burns, Mike Massaro, Marty Snider and Kelli Stavast handled pit road on the television side.

NBCSN
Booth announcers	Pit reporters
Lap-by-lap: Rick Allen; Color-commentator: Jeff Burton; Color-commentator: Steve Letarte	Dave Burns; Mike Massaro; Marty Snider; Kelli Stavast

=== Radio ===
PRN had the radio call for the race, which was simulcast on Sirius XM NASCAR Radio. Doug Rice, Mark Garrow and Wendy Venturini called the race from the booth when the field was racing down the front stretch. Rob Albright called the race from atop the suites in turn 3 when the field was racing down the backstretch. Brad Gillie, Brett McMillan, Jim Noble and Steve Richards worked pit road on the radio side.

PRN
Booth announcers	Turn announcers	Pit reporters
Lead announcer: Doug Rice; Announcer: Mark Garrow; Announcer: Wendy Venturini	Backstretch: Rob Albright	Brad Gillie; Brett McMillan; Jim Noble; Steve Richards

== Standings after the race ==
Drivers' Championship standings

	Pos	Driver	Points
	1	Kevin Harvick	908
	2	Joey Logano	865 (–43)
	3	Dale Earnhardt Jr.	819 (–89)
1	4	Brad Keselowski	793 (–115)
1	5	Jimmie Johnson	792 (–116)
2	6	Martin Truex Jr.	771 (–137)
	7	Matt Kenseth	753 (–155)
	8	Kurt Busch	713 (–195)
	9	Denny Hamlin	712 (–196)
	10	Jamie McMurray	696 (–212)
1	11	Ryan Newman	683 (–225)
1	12	Paul Menard	674 (–234)
	13	Jeff Gordon	672 (–236)
	14	Carl Edwards	666 (–242)
	15	Clint Bowyer	655 (–253)
	16	Aric Almirola	620 (–288)

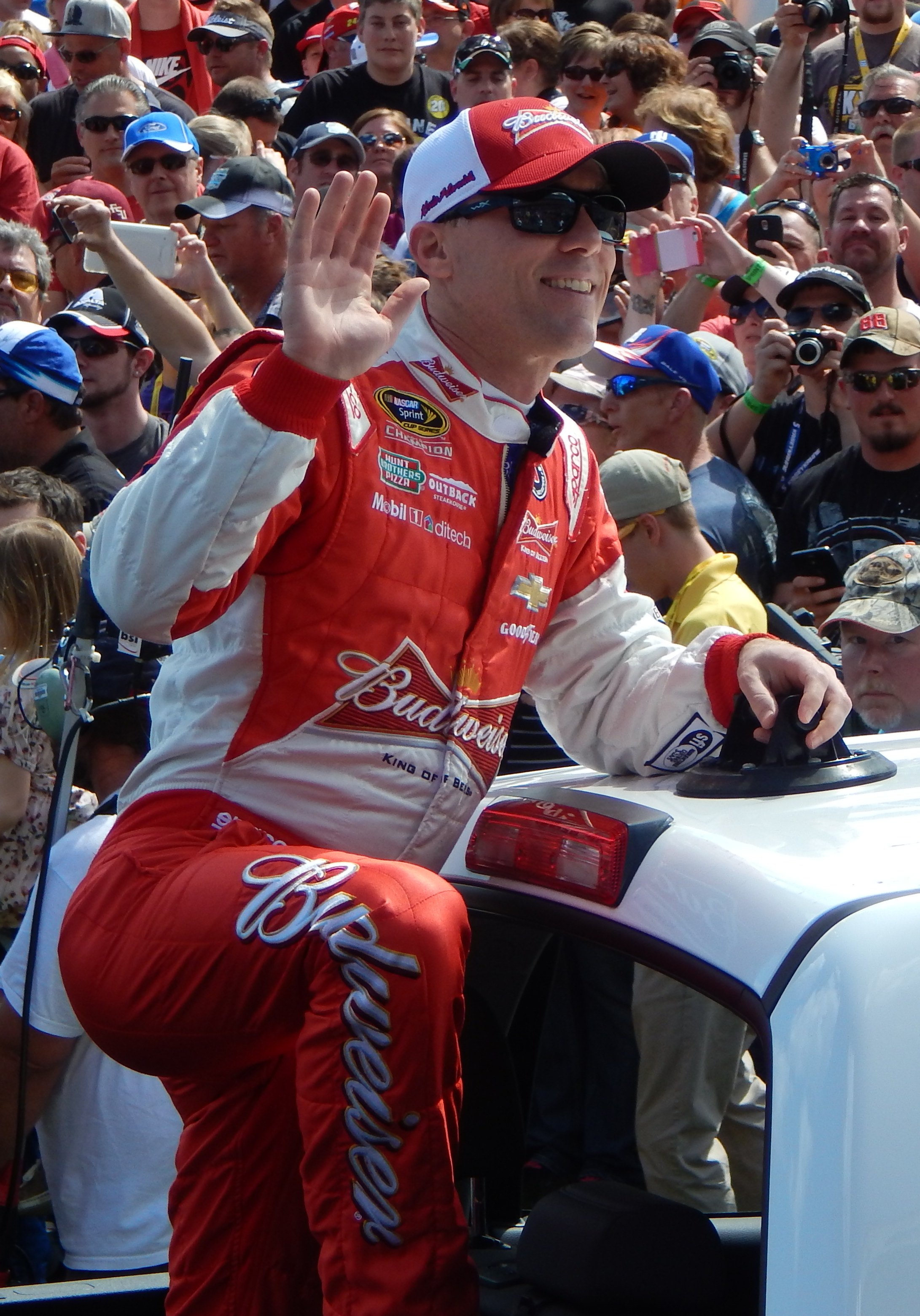
Kevin Harvick left Bristol with a 43–point lead over Joey Logano.

Manufacturers' Championship standings

Pos	Manufacturer	Points
1	Chevrolet	1,066
2	Toyota	996 (–70)
3	Ford	995 (–71)

- Note: Only the first sixteen positions are included for the driver standings.

Previous race: 2015 Pure Michigan 400	Sprint Cup Series; 2015 season	Next race: 2015 Bojangles' Southern 500
