= Charlie Menard =

American racing driver

- Born: October 18, 1972 (age 53); Eau Claire, Wisconsin, U.S.
- Education: University of Wisconsin–Eau Claire
- Occupations: Businessman; racing driver
- Known for: General Manager of Distribution, Manufacturing and Logistics for Menards
- Relatives: John Menard Jr. (uncle); Paul Menard (cousin)

Charlie Menard (born 1972) is the nephew of Menards owner John Menard Jr. He was the chief operating officer of the Menards home improvement store chain until late 2007. He moved to head up the Eau Claire, Wisconsin, Menards Distribution Center. In late 2011, Charlie moved to the newly created position of general manager of distribution, manufacturing and logistics – this position oversees all of the Menards distribution centers, their manufacturing plants and the transportation of goods. A graduate of the University of Wisconsin–Eau Claire, Menard worked his way through his uncle's Menards store chain. He lives in Middleton, Wisconsin.

== Racing career ==
While he was a member of Team Menard, the Menards racing team, Menard captured the 2004 NASCAR Late Model championship at the La Crosse Fairgrounds Speedway with a season-high six feature wins, and also claimed the 2004 Dodge NASCAR Weekly Series Midwest Region championship. Menard ran a part-time schedule on the ASA Late Model Series in 2005 and 2006, and claimed the Late Model win at the Oktoberfest Race Weekend at La Crosse on October 7, 2005. Menard has a streak of winning at least one feature during the Oktoberfest Race Weekend for the previous three years. In 2007 Menard pursued a full season on both the ASA Late Model Challenge Series and the ASA Late Model North Series. Menard hired former ASA Late Model competitor Chad Wood as his new crew chief in 2007. He received his first ASA Late Model Challenge Series win since La Crosse speedway in June winning at the Cayuga Speedway near Nelles Corners, Ontario, Canada.
