= Paul Menard =

American racing driver (born 1980)

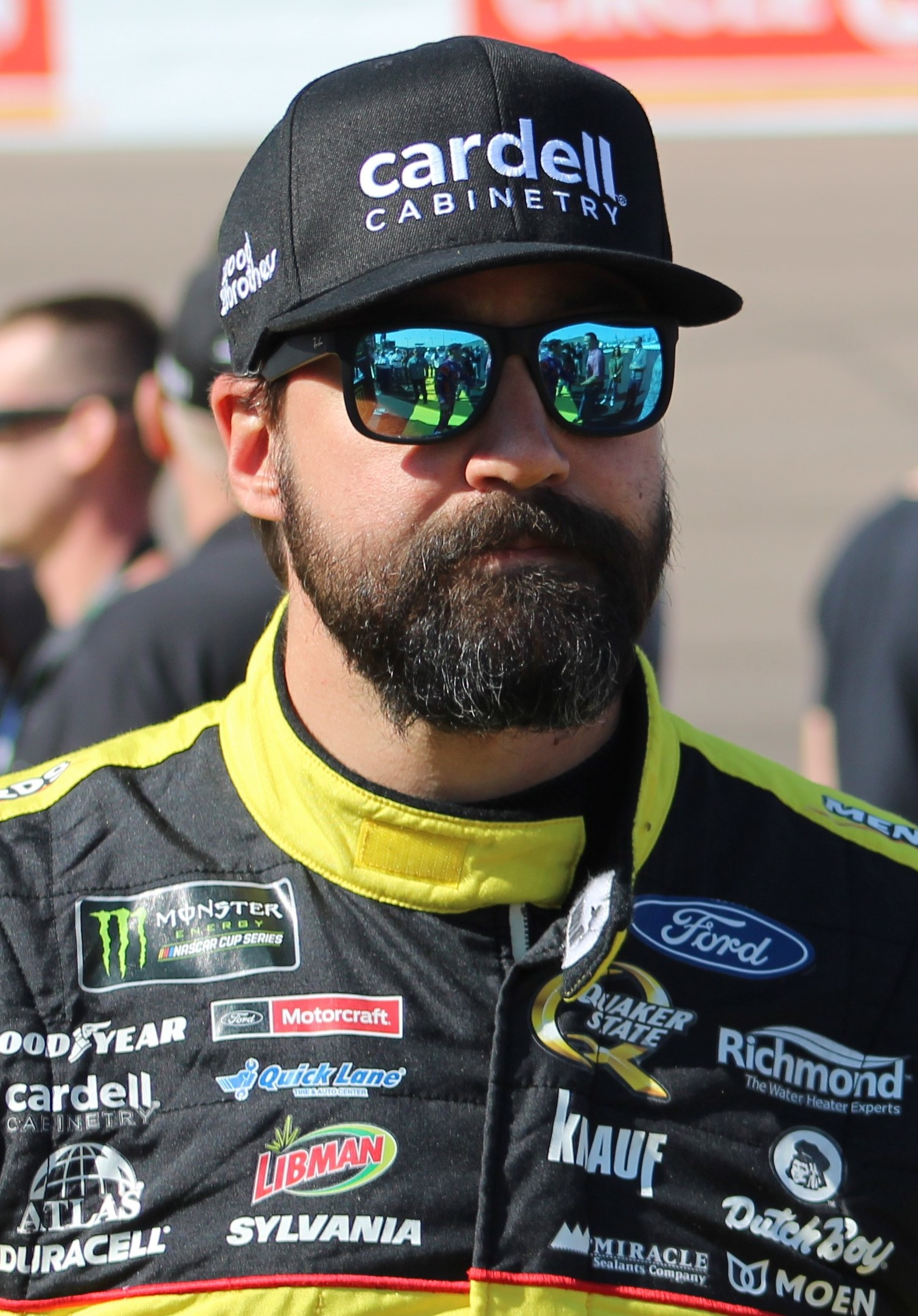
- Menard at the 2018 Can-Am 500
- Born: John Paul Christian Menard; August 21, 1980 (age 46); Eau Claire, Wisconsin, U.S.
- Height: 5 ft 10 in (1.78 m)
- Weight: 180 lb (82 kg)
- Achievements: 2024, 2025 SCCA Trans-Am TA Series Champion; 2011 Brickyard 400 winner

NASCAR Cup Series career
- 471 races run over 16 years
- 2019 position: 19th
- Best finish: 14th (2015)
- First race: 2003 Sirius Satellite Radio at the Glen (Watkins Glen)
- Last race: 2019 Ford EcoBoost 400 (Homestead)
- First win: 2011 Brickyard 400 (Indianapolis)
Wins	Top tens	Poles
1	69	2

NASCAR O'Reilly Auto Parts Series career
- 220 races run over 16 years
- 2019 position: 84th
- Best finish: 5th (2010)
- First race: 2003 Trace Adkins Chrome 300 (Nashville)
- Last race: 2019 ROXOR 200 (Loudon)
- First win: 2006 AT&T 250 (Milwaukee)
- Last win: 2015 Road America 180 (Road America)
Wins	Top tens	Poles
3	102	6

NASCAR FedEx Freight Truck Series career
- 8 races run over 3 years
- 2021 position: 45th
- Best finish: 42nd (2003)
- First race: 2003 GNC 200 (Milwaukee)
- Last race: 2021 United Rentals 176 (Watkins Glen)
Wins	Top tens	Poles
0	2	0
- Statistics up to date as of November 4, 2024.

John Paul Christian Menard (born August 21, 1980) is an American professional racing driver who currently competes full-time in the Trans-Am Series, driving the No. 3 Ford Mustang for 3GT Racing. Menard is the 2024 and 2025 Trans-Am Series champion in the TA class.

Menard competed full-time in the NASCAR Cup Series from 2007 to 2019, driving for Dale Earnhardt Inc., Yates Racing, Richard Petty Motorsports, Richard Childress Racing, and Wood Brothers Racing. He retired from full-time competition after the 2019 season. He has also competed in the NASCAR Xfinity Series in the past, including running part-time with Andy Petree Racing in 2003 and 2004, full-time with DEI in 2005 and 2006, and full-time with Roush Fenway Racing in 2010. He has won one Cup Series race (the 2011 Brickyard 400), three Xfinity Series races, and one ARCA Menards Series race.

He is the son of entrepreneur John Menard Jr., the founder of the Menards chain of home improvement stores.

== Racing career ==
=== Early career ===
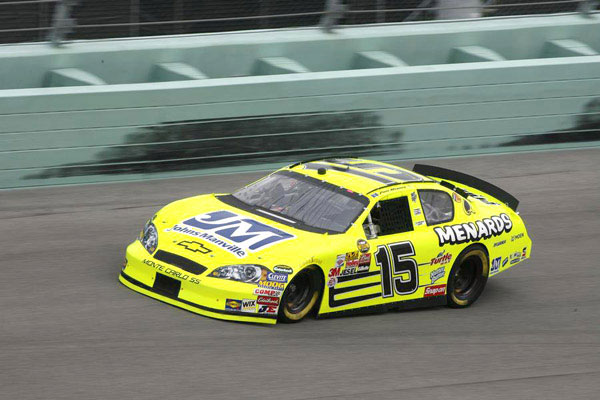
Menard in his No. 15 at Homestead-Miami Speedway in 2006

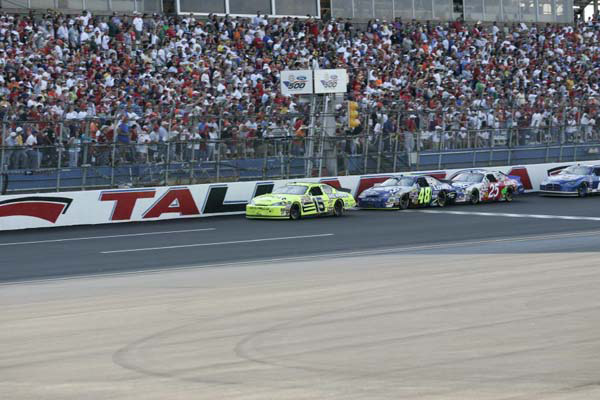
Menard leads at Talladega in 2006

Menard's racing career began at the age of eight when he won the Briggs Junior Karting Class Championship in his native Eau Claire, Wisconsin. He later won the Briggs Medium Class Champion before working his way up to higher level racing. He began ice racing at the age of fifteen and won ten International Ice Racing Association events in his career. He continues to compete in IIRA events in and around Wisconsin. In the summers he raced legends cars on short tracks in Wisconsin. He borrowed Bryan Reffner's Late Model for a week winning his heat race and placing around fourth in the feature. He decided to build his own late model and raced the car three to four times per week. In an interview with Motorsports Minute, Menard said he chose stock cars over Indy Cars because there was no feeder series for Indy Car in his native Wisconsin.

In 2000, he began racing a limited schedule in the NASCAR Re/Max Challenge Series, finishing thirteenth in points. During his rookie season in 2001, he earned a pole and victory at Road America in Elkhart Lake, Wisconsin, finishing ninth in points. The 2002 season saw Menard compete in ReMax Challenge (two poles, seventh in points), SCCA Trans-Am (one front-row start, four top-ten finishes), Grand Am Cup (victories at Fontana and Phoenix) and the NASCAR Southwest Tour. He capped his season in the latter series with a last-lap pass of veteran Ken Schrader for the Phoenix victory.

In 2003, Menard joined Andy Petree Racing to compete in NASCAR Cup Series, Busch, and Truck Series events while still competing in ARCA. In his first ARCA start at Salem Speedway, he qualified second and finished fourth. Later that year, he started on the pole at Winchester, Indiana, and then scored his first ARCA victory at Talladega Superspeedway. He also had top finishes of ninth in the Busch race at Indianapolis Raceway Park and eighth in the Truck race at the Kansas Speedway.

=== Dale Earnhardt, Inc. (2004–2008) ===
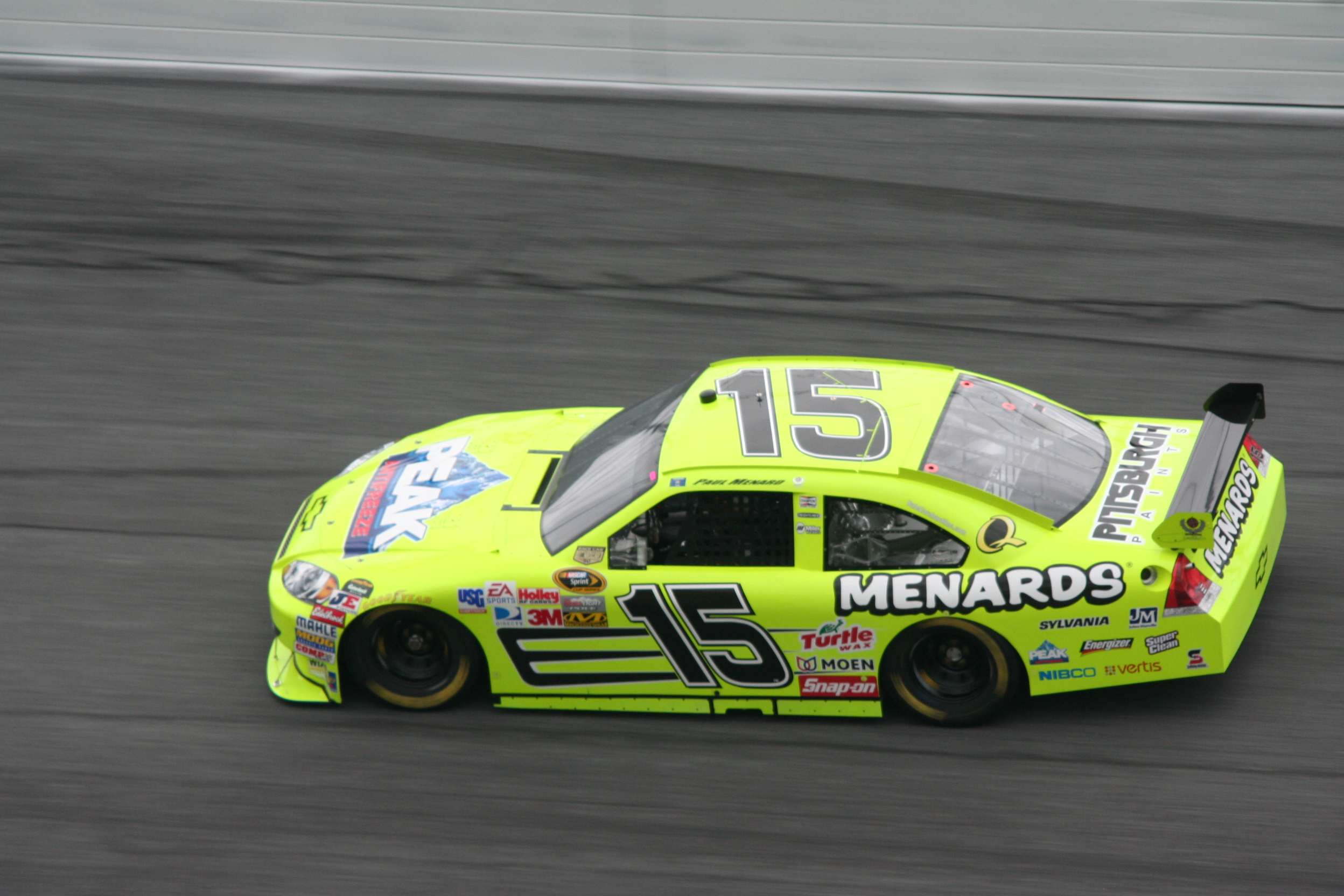
2008 NASCAR Cup Series car

In 2004, Menard began the NASCAR Busch Series season driving the No. 33 Chevrolet. Midway through the season, he moved to Dale Earnhardt, Inc. in the No. 11 Chevy. Ten races later, Menard won his first career pole position at Kansas Speedway and finished 23rd in points despite no top-tens and missing seven races. With Dan Stillman as crew chief beginning in 2005, they started out by leading 57 laps at Daytona. Winning the Bud Pole Award at Talladega also had them running up front until getting caught up in a wreck. He got his first top-ten and top-five by placing fifth at the Kentucky Speedway. From there, the team went from twentieth to the top-ten in points before finishing in sixth place overall, for the season.

In 2006, driving the No. 15 car part-time for DEI, Menard scored his first top-ten finish in the NASCAR Nextel Cup Series by coming in seventh place at the Golden Corral 500 at Atlanta Motor Speedway. Menard also won his first Busch Series race on June 24 at his home track of the Milwaukee Mile by holding off a late race charge and bump from Cup regular Kevin Harvick. Harvick eventually caused a multi-car wreck attempting to bump him out of the way. Menard finished off 2006 with a sixth place finish in the standings, tying his best finish in the standings last year (2005). He scored sixteen top-ten finishes and seven top-five finishes in the Busch Series.

In 2007, Menard ran his first full-time Cup season. He failed to qualify for six races that season, but after DEI's merger with Ginn Racing, the owner's points were transferred from Sterling Marlin's No. 14 car to Menard, who was then locked into the rest of the races. His best finish of 2007 was in the Citizens Bank 400 where he finished twelfth. In the Busch Series, he picked up five top-five finishes. After the fall race at Charlotte, in which Menard and Tony Stewart made contact on pit road, a feud between the drivers ensued; Stewart had driven for John Menard in the Indy Racing League's early years.

In 2008, Menard won his first Sprint Cup Series pole at Daytona International Speedway in early July and remained in the top 35 in owner's points for the entire season. At Talladega in the fall, Menard had the best run of his career leading laps and coming home with a strong second-place finish. He also was up front for a good part of the day in the other. He finished up the season with $3,559,130 in earnings and finished 26th in points standings, a career high.

=== Yates Racing/Richard Petty Motorsports (2009–2010) ===
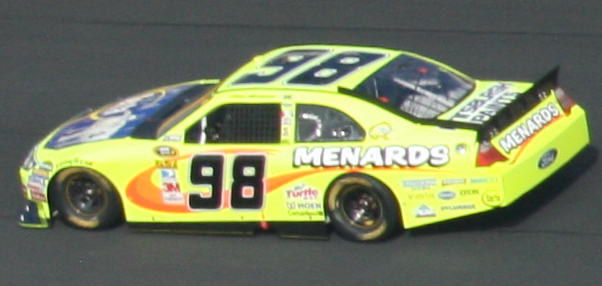
2010 Sprint Cup Series car at Charlotte Motor Speedway

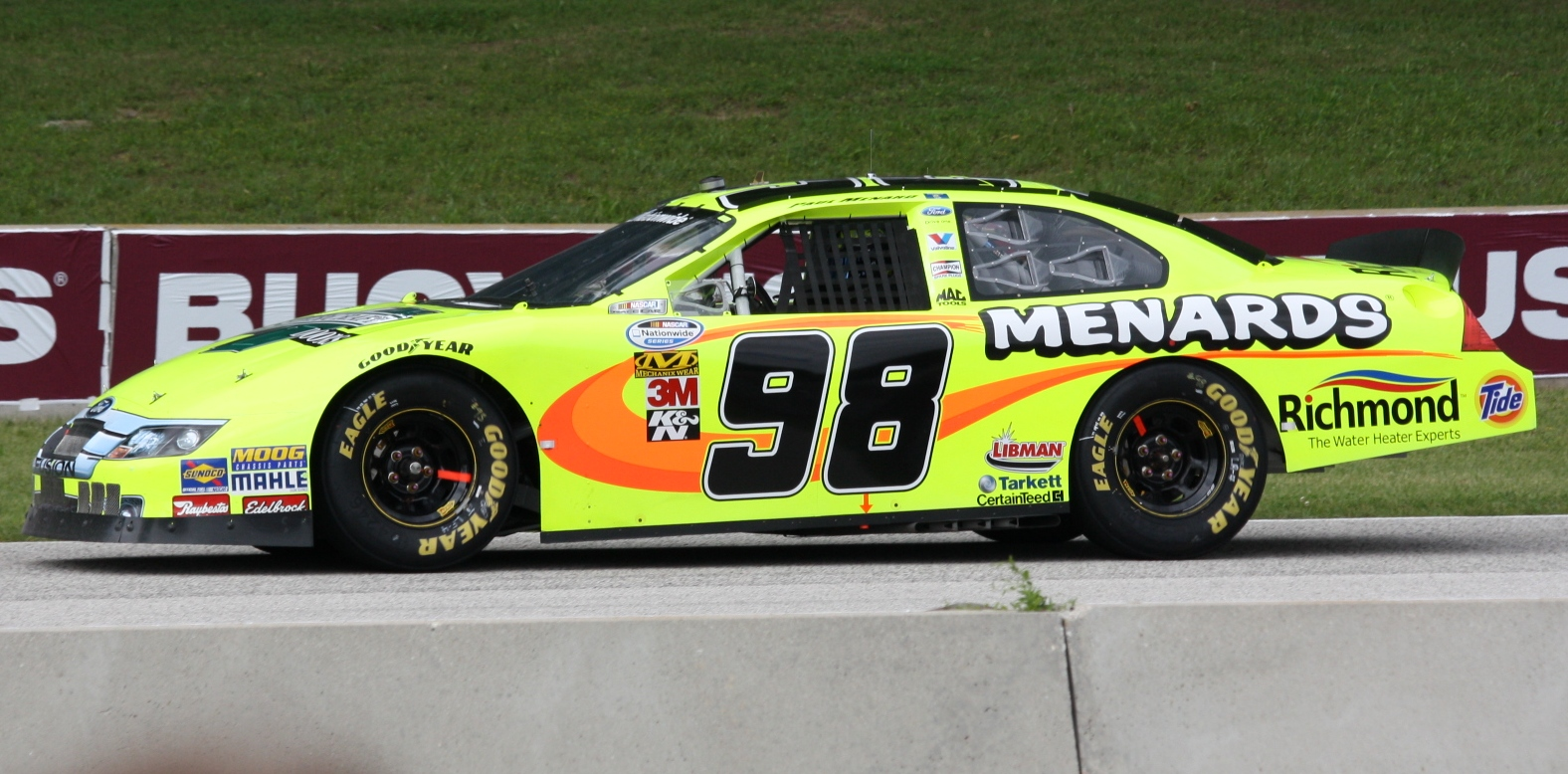
2010 Nationwide Series car at Road America

For the 2009 season, Menard moved over to the No. 98 Ford Fusion operated by Yates Racing. Menard showed limited improvement in 2009, running in the top 10 many times, only to later have problems. For example, he crashed at Las Vegas Motor Speedway while running very well, and was involved in a wreck with only forty laps to go, while running seventh. These issues lead to the team being in danger of falling out of the top-35 in points standings for much of the year. Menard's best finishes included two thirteenth place finishes in the Aarons 499 at Talladega Superspeedway as well as the Samsung 500 at Texas Motor Speedway, and a fifteenth place finish in the Southern 500. At the second Dover race, Menard started tenth and ran in the top-ten for most of the day, only to find his car tighten up near the end of the race and come home 19th. At the end of the 2009 NASCAR Sprint Cup Series, Menard was the only driver to not score a top-ten finish who ran all of the races. Menard ended up finishing 31st in the final point standings.

For the 2010 season, his No. 98 team moved over to Richard Petty Motorsports, due to its merger with Yates Racing. In his first start with RPM he finished thirteenth in the 2010 Daytona 500. He then went on to have top-twenties at Las Vegas and Fontana. The following race at Atlanta Motor Speedway Menard posted his second highest career Cup series finish with a fifth place showing followed by a few more top-twenties. After that, he fell from the top-twelve in points. At Charlotte, he finished eighth after running in the top-ten all race long. Menard also posted another top-ten in the circuit's nineteenth race at Chicagoland Speedway. At Dover International Speedway in September, he ended up with a seventh place finish. The following week he started from the second position at Kansas. While most publications rated him around 30th in the 2010 preseason, he finished 23rd in points.

In early 2010, Menard drove in the No. 90 Daytona Prototype for Spirit of Daytona Racing in the Rolex 24 hours at Daytona International Speedway. In 2010, he came close to winning the Nationwide Series race at Road America in his hometown of Wisconsin. Menard was running seventh when he was spun out on the final lap by road course specialist Tony Ave. It appeared that Menard was to blame, but footage captured by a fan showed that Owen Kelly was at fault.

=== Richard Childress Racing (2011–2017) ===
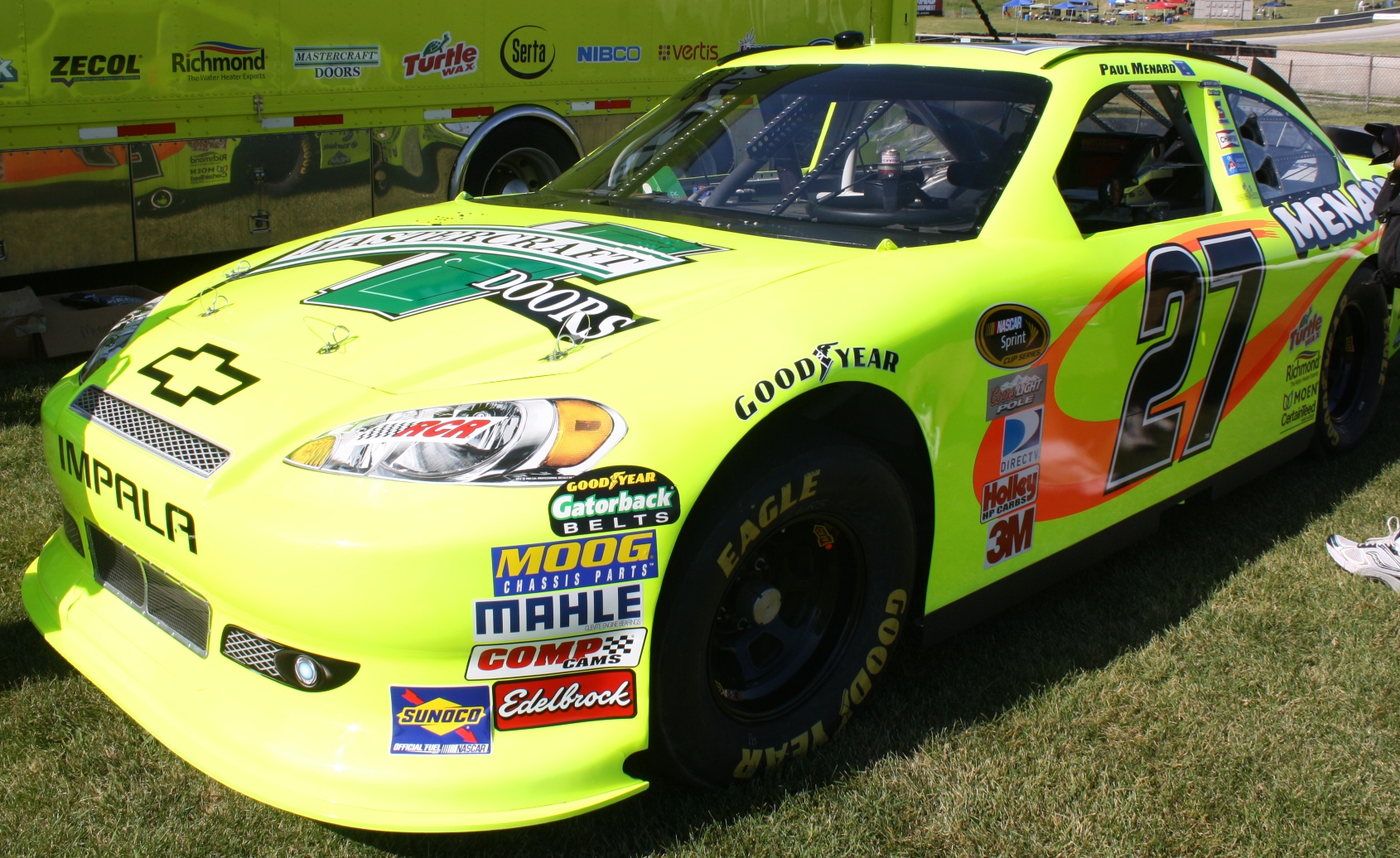
2012 Sprint Cup car

Menard moved to Richard Childress Racing in 2011, driving the No. 27. On July 31, 2011, Menard won his first and only Sprint Cup race in his 167th start, in the Brickyard 400 at the prestigious Indianapolis Motor Speedway. He did so by making his last pit stop with 36 laps to go. He led late, but with nine laps to go, he was passed by Jamie McMurray. With four to go, he regained the lead and held off Jeff Gordon, the winner of the inaugural Brickyard 400 in the final laps, having enough fuel to do so. He was the first member of the Menard family to win at Indianapolis, in any event, held at the track. He also joined Trevor Bayne, Regan Smith, David Ragan, and Marcos Ambrose as first-time winners in the 2011 season.

In September 2011 at Richmond, Menard and RCR became the center of controversy when Menard spun in the waning laps. It was believed that his accident was intentional, intended to assist his teammate Kevin Harvick who later won the race against Jeff Gordon who would have won if the caution did not come out.

In 2012, Menard did not perform well. He crashed during the Aaron's 499 at Talladega and went winless for 2012. In 2013, he slightly improved when he was briefly in Chase for the Sprint Cup contention. A blown engine early in the Coke Zero 400 caused him to be knocked out of the Chase with a few races left before the Chase began. In the season-ending Ford EcoBoost 400, Menard's tire exploded upon stopping in his pit box; Menard stated, "About a lap later, they told me I was on fire. I lost my brakes, and the damned wheel blew right off."

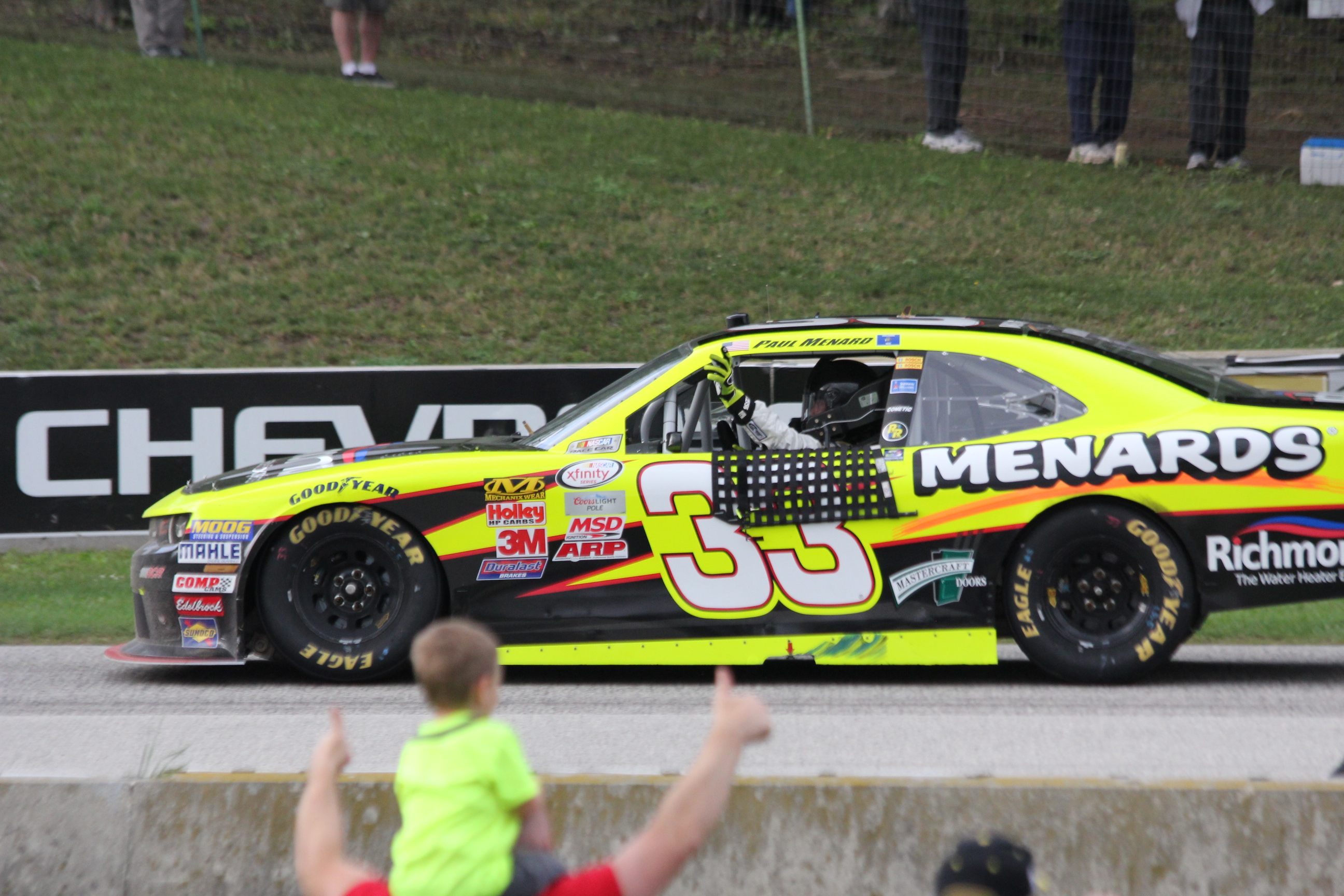
Fans waving to Menard, celebrating his third Xfinity Series win at Road America.

In 2014, Menard scored thirteen top-tens (a career high) and held a chase spot for most of the regular season but two consecutive eighteenth place finishes at Atlanta and Richmond (final race of the regular season) dropped him out of contention.

Menard won the Nationwide race at Michigan for his first NNS win since 2006 in June 2014. He won after Joey Logano blew a tire with four laps to go.

In the 2015 Sprint Unlimited at Daytona, Menard won the pole for the race by drawing. He led the first seven laps until he was involved in a big wreck, finishing 21st. The race was later won by Matt Kenseth. Menard later finished in the top-five in Auto Club and in Talladega and got five top-tens and 22 top-fifteens. He made the Chase for the first time in his career mostly because he had only one DNF (a blown engine in Texas), grabbing the final spot by seventeen points over Aric Almirola. He was eliminated in the first round, but with Matt Kenseth's two-race suspension, Menard passed him and finished in a career-best of fourteenth in the standings. Also in August 2015, Menard took the checkers at Road America, holding off Blake Koch and Ryan Blaney for his third Xfinity Series win. Aside from the 2011 Brickyard 400, the win was Menard's biggest of his career, as Menard had grown up a few miles from the track.

In the 2016 Sprint Unlimited, Menard finished in a career best third place, after surviving several big ones.

To start of 2017, Menard survived wrecks in the Daytona 500 and brought home a fifth place finish after a few cars ran out of gas. The next week at Atlanta, he finished 25th. Menard scored his second top-ten of the year in the GEICO 500 at Talladega, finishing ninth. In the Coke Zero 400, Menard ran up front late and came home third, barely behind Ricky Stenhouse Jr. and Clint Bowyer. Menard survived most of the carnage in the Brickyard 400 but crashed in a late big one.

=== Wood Brothers Racing (2018–2019) ===
On July 26, 2017, Menard was announced as the replacement for Ryan Blaney in the No. 21 Wood Brothers Racing Ford starting in 2018.

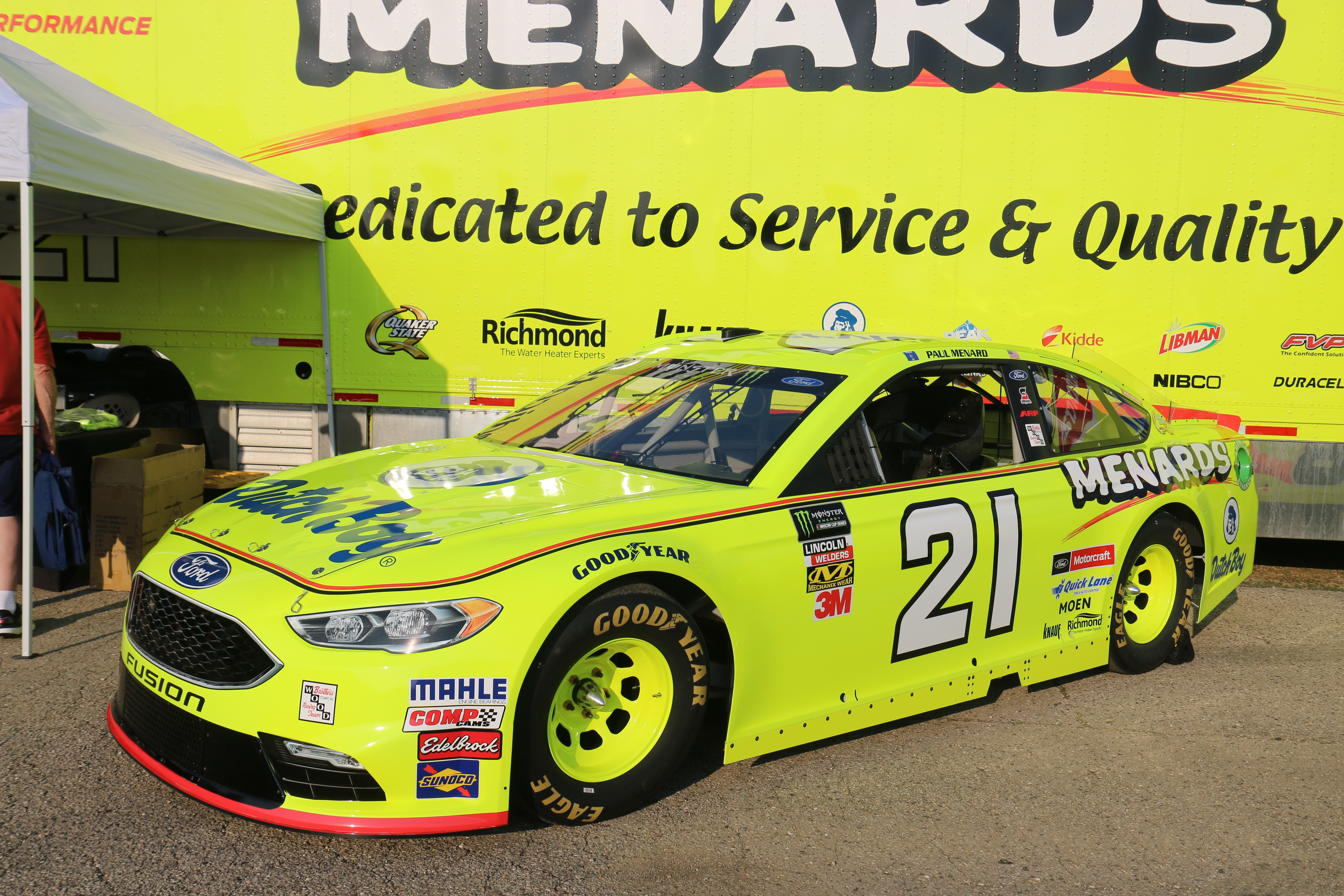
Menard's 2018 No. 21 car

On June 30, 2018, almost ten years to the day, Menard got his second ever NASCAR Cup Series pole at Chicagoland Speedway for the Overton's 400.

On July 12, 2019, Menard announced he had a contract for the 2020 season, indicating that he planned to stay with the Wood Brothers. On September 10, 2019, Menard announced his retirement from full-time racing after the 2019 season.

=== ThorSport Racing (2021) ===
On May 17, 2021, Truck Series team ThorSport Racing announced that Menard would return to NASCAR and compete in a fifth part-time truck for the team, the No. 66, in the series' new race at Circuit of the Americas. It is his first NASCAR start in his semi-retirement, and his first Truck Series start since 2007 when he competed in the spring Martinsville race in the No. 51 for Billy Ballew Motorsports.

== Personal life ==
A native of Eau Claire, Wisconsin, Menard is the son of Menards founder John Menard Jr. He attended the University of Wisconsin-Eau Claire, majoring in business. He currently resides in the Charlotte, North Carolina, area with his wife Jennifer. The couple had their first child, a daughter, on March 18, 2014. The family later welcomed another child, a son, in November 2017. Menard is a Roman Catholic and a fan of power metal music. Menard doesn't have any social media and he chooses to stay away from it because "it is nothing good and there's so much more to life than looking at other people's lives behind a screen."

== Motorsports career results ==
=== NASCAR ===
(key) (Bold – Pole position awarded by qualifying time. Italics – Pole position earned by points standings or practice time. * – Most laps led.)

==== Cup Series ====
NASCAR Cup Series results
Year	Team	No.	Make	1	2	3	4	5	6	7	8	9	10	11	12	13	14	15	16	17	18	19	20	21	22	23	24	25	26	27	28	29	30	31	32	33	34	35	36	Rank	Pts	Ref
2003	Andy Petree Racing	33	Chevy	DAY	CAR	LVS	ATL	DAR	BRI	TEX	TAL	MAR	CAL	RCH	CLT	DOV	POC	MCH	SON; DNQ	DAY	CHI	NHA	POC	IND	GLN; 29	MCH	BRI	DAR	RCH	NHA	DOV	TAL	KAN	CLT	MAR	ATL	PHO	CAR	HOM	66th	76	
2005	Dale Earnhardt, Inc.	1	Chevy	DAY	CAL	LVS	ATL	BRI	MAR	TEX	PHO	TAL	DAR	RCH	CLT	DOV	POC	MCH	SON	DAY	CHI	NHA	POC	IND	GLN; 27	MCH	BRI	CAL	RCH	NHA	DOV	TAL	KAN	CLT	MAR	ATL	TEX	PHO		71st	82	
2005	Robby Gordon Motorsports	7	Chevy																																				HOM; QL^{†}	71st	82	
2006	Dale Earnhardt, Inc.	15	Chevy	DAY; DNQ	CAL	LVS	ATL; 7	BRI	MAR	TEX	PHO	TAL	RCH	DAR	CLT; 14	DOV	POC	MCH	SON	DAY	CHI; DNQ	NHA	POC	IND; DNQ	GLN; 29	MCH; 20	BRI	CAL	RCH	NHA	DOV	KAN	TAL; 34	CLT	MAR	ATL	TEX; 41	PHO	HOM; 17	45th	669	
2007	Dale Earnhardt, Inc.	15	Chevy	DAY; DNQ	CAL; 20	LVS; 32	ATL; 31	BRI; DNQ	MAR; DNQ	TEX; 15	PHO; 25	TAL; 43	RCH; 16	DAR; 31	CLT; DNQ	DOV; DNQ	POC; 28	MCH; 12	SON; DNQ	NHA; 39	DAY; 21	CHI; 42	IND; 20	POC; 26	GLN; 19	MCH; 39	BRI; 24	CAL; 24	RCH; 26	NHA; 24	DOV; 21	KAN; 27	TAL; 38	CLT; 22	MAR; 24	ATL; 27	TEX; 30	PHO; 22	HOM; 35	34th	2496	
2008	Dale Earnhardt, Inc.	15	Chevy	DAY; 22	CAL; 27	LVS; 22	ATL; 19	BRI; 32	MAR; 16	TEX; 17	PHO; 21	TAL; 14	RCH; 31	DAR; 36	CLT; 41	DOV; 22	POC; 25	MCH; 11	SON; 34	NHA; 29	**DAY**; 15	CHI; 26	IND; 41	POC; 42	GLN; 28	MCH; 24	BRI; 16	CAL; 37	RCH; 34	NHA; 21	DOV; 21	KAN; 27	TAL; 2	CLT; 26	MAR; 27	ATL; 31	TEX; 22	PHO; 26	HOM; 30	26th	3151	
2009	Yates Racing	98	Ford	DAY; 38	CAL; 37	LVS; 35	ATL; 28	BRI; 25	MAR; 25	TEX; 13	PHO; 23	TAL; 13	RCH; 30	DAR; 15	CLT; 29	DOV; 32	POC; 29	MCH; 34	SON; 21	NHA; 30	DAY; 23	CHI; 35	IND; 29	POC; 26	GLN; 19	MCH; 26	BRI; 24	ATL; 15	RCH; 28	NHA; 34	DOV; 19	KAN; 30	CAL; 27	CLT; 27	MAR; 23	TAL; 42	TEX; 29	PHO; 29	HOM; 26	31st	2979	
2010	Richard Petty Motorsports	98	Ford	DAY; 13	CAL; 18	LVS; 17	ATL; 5	BRI; 18	MAR; 14	PHO; 29	TEX; 35	TAL; 25	RCH; 27	DAR; 30	DOV; 21	CLT; 8	POC; 16	MCH; 25	SON; 22	NHA; 28	DAY; 18	CHI; 10	IND; 14	POC; 13	GLN; 16	MCH; 35	BRI; 21	ATL; 35	RCH; 26	NHA; 28	DOV; 7	KAN; 8	CAL; 22	CLT; 24	MAR; 13	TAL; 13	TEX; 10	PHO; 29	HOM; 19	23rd	3776	
2011	Richard Childress Racing	27	Chevy	DAY; 9	PHO; 17	LVS; 12	BRI; 5	CAL; 16	MAR; 38	TEX; 5	TAL; 12	RCH; 37	DAR; 22	DOV; 24	CLT; 29	KAN; 19	POC; 14	MCH; 4	SON; 17	DAY; 8	KEN; 24	NHA; 24	IND; 1	POC; 10	GLN; 32	MCH; 26	BRI; 30	ATL; 18	RCH; 34	CHI; 20	NHA; 20	DOV; 16	KAN; 12	CLT; 17	TAL; 12	MAR; 24	TEX; 15	PHO; 9	HOM; 16	17th	947	
2012	Richard Childress Racing	27	Chevy	DAY; 6	PHO; 31	LVS; 7	BRI; 10	CAL; 19	MAR; 26	TEX; 18	KAN; 18	RCH; 13	TAL; 17	DAR; 13	CLT; 15	DOV; 17	POC; 9	MCH; 22	SON; 20	KEN; 12	DAY; 14	NHA; 17	IND; 14	POC; 11	GLN; 12	MCH; 9	BRI; 10	ATL; 8	RCH; 23	CHI; 15	NHA; 12	DOV; 22	TAL; 28	CLT; 27	KAN; 3	MAR; 12	TEX; 27	PHO; 9	HOM; 11	16th	1006	
2013	Richard Childress Racing	27	Chevy	DAY; 21	PHO; 20	LVS; 10	BRI; 9	CAL; 8	MAR; 19	TEX; 17	KAN; 10	RCH; 13	TAL; 26	DAR; 19	CLT; 13	DOV; 20	POC; 30	MCH; 14	SON; 14	KEN; 30	DAY; 43	NHA; 17	IND; 12	POC; 32	GLN; 17	MCH; 4	BRI; 6	ATL; 24	RCH; 5	CHI; 22	NHA; 22	DOV; 18	KAN; 7	CLT; 24	TAL; 4	MAR; 22	TEX; 15	PHO; 16	HOM; 39	17th	949	
2014	Richard Childress Racing	27	Chevy	DAY; 32	PHO; 23	LVS; 3	BRI; 21	CAL; 9	MAR; 10	TEX; 9	DAR; 41	RCH; 24	TAL; 6	KAN; 17	CLT; 8	DOV; 10	POC; 26	MCH; 4	SON; 5	KEN; 15	DAY; 16	NHA; 19	IND; 34	POC; 33	GLN; 32	MCH; 4	BRI; 9	ATL; 18	RCH; 18	CHI; 21	NHA; 15	DOV; 16	KAN; 9	CLT; 42	TAL; 36	MAR; 14	TEX; 17	PHO; 23	HOM; 4	21st	944	
2015	Richard Childress Racing	27	Chevy	DAY; 25	ATL; 13	LVS; 12	PHO; 14	CAL; 4	MAR; 23	TEX; 41	BRI; 11	RCH; 15	TAL; 3	KAN; 18	CLT; 14	DOV; 8	POC; 31	MCH; 8	SON; 13	DAY; 16	KEN; 15	NHA; 25	IND; 14	POC; 11	GLN; 13	MCH; 12	BRI; 24	DAR; 26	RCH; 26	CHI; 17	NHA; 15	DOV; 25	CLT; 36	KAN; 19	TAL; 6	MAR; 15	TEX; 13	PHO; 13	HOM; 21	14th	2262	
2016	Richard Childress Racing	27	Chevy	DAY; 18	ATL; 18	LVS; 15	PHO; 38	CAL; 15	MAR; 8	TEX; 26	BRI; 15	RCH; 22	TAL; 26	KAN; 40	DOV; 11	CLT; 17	POC; 33	MCH; 18	SON; 16	DAY; 36	KEN; 18	NHA; 18	IND; 10	POC; 35	GLN; 22	BRI; 32	MCH; 18	DAR; 16	RCH; 40	CHI; 21	NHA; 25	DOV; 22	CLT; 34	KAN; 20	TAL; 13	MAR; 25	TEX; 28	PHO; 10	HOM; 14	25th	678	
2017	Richard Childress Racing	27	Chevy	DAY; 5	ATL; 25	LVS; 19	PHO; 21	CAL; 28	MAR; 19	TEX; 36	BRI; 16	RCH; 25	TAL; 9	KAN; 35	CLT; 13	DOV; 33	POC; 20	MCH; 22	SON; 11	DAY; 3	KEN; 21	NHA; 22	IND; 16	POC; 19	GLN; 18	MCH; 34	BRI; 16	DAR; 16	RCH; 28	CHI; 14	NHA; 20	DOV; 26	CLT; 19	TAL; 12	KAN; 12	MAR; 20	TEX; 23	PHO; 15	HOM; 16	23rd	631	
2018	Wood Brothers Racing	21	Ford	DAY; 6	ATL; 17	LVS; 9	PHO; 36	CAL; 19	MAR; 13	TEX; 30	BRI; 13	RCH; 24	TAL; 30	DOV; 34	KAN; 6	CLT; 14	POC; 11	MCH; 5	SON; 26	**CHI**; 13	DAY; 28	KEN; 11	NHA; 17	POC; 21	GLN; 28	MCH; 16	BRI; 36	DAR; 17	IND; 9	LVS; 10	RCH; 22	CLT; 33	DOV; 16	TAL; 9	KAN; 32	MAR; 22	TEX; 13	PHO; 29	HOM; 25	19th	692	
2019	Wood Brothers Racing	21	Ford	DAY; 29	ATL; 14	LVS; 15	PHO; 17	CAL; 20	MAR; 15	TEX; 19	BRI; 6	RCH; 10	TAL; 16	DOV; 17	KAN; 24	CLT; 14	POC; 18	MCH; 13	SON; 22	CHI; 21	DAY; 16	KEN; 11	NHA; 13	POC; 18	GLN; 18	MCH; 15	BRI; 23	DAR; 9	IND; 10	LVS; 14	RCH; 27	CLT; 16	DOV; 12	TAL; 16	KAN; 18	MAR; 21	TEX; 20	PHO; 12	HOM; 17	19th	777	
^{†} – Qualified for Robby Gordon

===== Daytona 500 =====
Year	Team	Manufacturer	Start	Finish
2006	Dale Earnhardt, Inc.	Chevrolet	DNQ	
2007	Dale Earnhardt, Inc.	Chevrolet	DNQ	
2008	Dale Earnhardt, Inc.	Chevrolet	21	22
2009	Yates Racing	Ford	19	38
2010	Richard Petty Motorsports	Ford	32	13
2011	Richard Childress Racing	Chevrolet	19	9
2012	Richard Childress Racing	Chevrolet	37	6
2013	Richard Childress Racing	Chevrolet	16	21
2014	Richard Childress Racing	Chevrolet	10	32
2015	Richard Childress Racing	Chevrolet	21	25
2016	Richard Childress Racing	Chevrolet	37	18
2017	Richard Childress Racing	Chevrolet	33	5
2018	Wood Brothers Racing	Ford	16	6
2019	Wood Brothers Racing	Ford	7	29

==== Xfinity Series ====
NASCAR Xfinity Series results
Year	Team	No.	Make	1	2	3	4	5	6	7	8	9	10	11	12	13	14	15	16	17	18	19	20	21	22	23	24	25	26	27	28	29	30	31	32	33	34	35	NXSC	Pts	Ref
2003	Andy Petree Racing	55	Chevy	DAY	CAR	LVS	DAR	BRI	TEX	TAL	NSH	CAL	RCH	GTY	NZH	CLT	DOV	NSH; 12	KEN; 14	MLW	DAY	CHI; 37	NHA	PPR; 23	IRP; 9	MCH	BRI	DAR	RCH; DNQ	DOV	KAN	CLT	MEM	ATL	PHO; 22	CAR	HOM		60th	629	
2004	Andy Petree Racing	33	Chevy	DAY; 32	CAR; 22	LVS; 21	DAR; 26	BRI; 28	TEX; 14	NSH; 16	TAL; 16	CAL; 28	GTY; 22	RCH; 33	NZH; 13	CLT; 19	DOV; 21	NSH																					23rd	2742	
2004	Michael Waltrip Racing	99	Chevy																KEN; QL^{†}	MLW	DAY	CHI																	23rd	2742	
2004	Dale Earnhardt, Inc.	11	Chevy																				NHA; 18	PPR; 12	IRP; 20	MCH; DNQ	BRI; 36	CAL; 21	RCH; 13	DOV; 15	**KAN**; 17	CLT; DNQ	MEM; 11	ATL; 19	PHO; 14	DAR; 12	HOM; 34		23rd	2742	
2005	Dale Earnhardt, Inc.	11	Chevy	DAY; 17	CAL; 20	MXC; 34	LVS; 37	ATL; 24	NSH; 36	BRI; 22	TEX; 18	PHO; 15	**TAL**; 27	DAR; 30	RCH; 36	CLT; 12	DOV; 28	NSH; 13	KEN; 5	MLW; 3	DAY; 6	CHI; 9	NHA; 7	PPR; 12	GTY; 5	IRP; 7	GLN; 8	MCH; 6	BRI; 41	CAL; 10	RCH; 2	DOV; 10	KAN; 36	CLT; 3	MEM; 6	TEX; 17	PHO; 13	HOM; 5	6th	4101	
2006	Dale Earnhardt, Inc.	11	Chevy	DAY; 38	CAL; 17	MXC; 5	LVS; 20	ATL; 10	BRI; 16	TEX; 7	NSH; 9	PHO; 17	TAL; 9	RCH; 8	DAR; 13	CLT; 24	DOV; 35	NSH; 5	KEN; 9	MLW; 1*	DAY; 37	CHI; 39	NHA; 4	MAR; 12	GTY; 35	IRP; 9	GLN; 18	MCH; 25	BRI; 10	CAL; 4	RCH; 4	DOV; 37	KAN; 10	CLT; 13	MEM; 23	TEX; 27	PHO; 37	HOM; 3	6th	4075	
2007	Dale Earnhardt, Inc.	15	Chevy	DAY; 17	CAL; 37	MXC	LVS; 36	ATL; 18	BRI	NSH	TEX; 9	PHO	TAL	RCH	DAR; 22	CLT	DOV	NSH	KEN	MLW	NHA	DAY	CHI; 6	GTY	IRP	CGV	GLN; 4	MCH; 7	BRI	CAL	RCH; 40	DOV	KAN; 7	CLT	MEM	TEX	PHO	HOM	43rd	1208	
2009	Yates Racing	98	Ford	DAY	CAL	LVS	BRI; 11	TEX; 5	NSH	PHO; 14	TAL	RCH	DAR; DNQ	CLT; 21	DOV; 6	NSH	KEN	MLW	NHA; 35	DAY	CHI; 14	GTY	IRP	IOW	GLN; 29	MCH; 10	BRI; 9	CGV; 15	ATL; 12	RCH; 13	DOV	KAN	CAL; 11	CLT	MEM	TEX	PHO; 30	HOM; 14	25th	1876	
2010	Roush Fenway Racing	98	Ford	DAY; 6	CAL; 19	LVS; 8	BRI; 11	NSH; 11	PHO; 7	TEX; 10	TAL; 8	RCH; 19	DAR; 10	DOV; 28	CLT; 18	NSH; 3	KEN; 32	ROA; 16	NHA; 9	DAY; 28	CHI; 11	GTY; 4	IRP; 9	IOW; 16	GLN; 17	MCH; 5	BRI; 13	CGV; 5	ATL; 9	RCH; 8	DOV; 7	KAN; 8	CAL; 12	CLT; 35	GTY; 9	TEX; 9	PHO; 13	HOM; 9	5th	4467	
2011	Kevin Harvick Inc.	33	Chevy	DAY	PHO	LVS	BRI	CAL	TEX; 3	TAL	NSH	RCH; 2	DAR	DOV	IOW	CLT	CHI	**MCH**; 4	ROA	DAY	KEN	NHA	NSH	IRP	IOW	GLN; 6	CGV	BRI	ATL	RCH	CHI; 9	DOV	KAN; 4	**CLT**; 8	TEX	PHO	HOM		102nd	0^{1}	
2012	Richard Childress Racing	33	Chevy	DAY	PHO	LVS	BRI	CAL	**TEX**; 2*	RCH	TAL	DAR	IOW	CLT	DOV	MCH; 8	ROA	KEN	DAY	NHA	CHI	IND; 8	IOW	GLN; 8	CGV	BRI	ATL	RCH	CHI; 5	KEN	DOV; 2	CLT	KAN; 16*	TEX	PHO	HOM			109th	0^{1}	
2013	Richard Childress Racing	33	Chevy	DAY	PHO	LVS	BRI	CAL	TEX	RCH	TAL	DAR	CLT	DOV	IOW	MCH; 3	ROA	KEN	DAY	NHA; 32	CHI	IND; 6	IOW	GLN	MOH	BRI	ATL	RCH	CHI	KEN	DOV	KAN; 2	CLT	TEX	PHO	HOM			98th	0^{1}	
2014	Richard Childress Racing	33	Chevy	DAY	PHO	LVS	BRI	CAL	TEX	DAR	RCH	TAL	IOW	CLT	DOV	MCH; 1	ROA	KEN; 4	DAY	NHA; 19	CHI	IND; 6	IOW	GLN; 9	MOH	BRI	ATL	RCH	CHI; 11	KEN	DOV	KAN; 4	CLT	TEX	PHO	HOM; 12			83rd	0^{1}	
2015	Richard Childress Racing	33	Chevy	DAY	ATL; 6	LVS	PHO	CAL	TEX	BRI	RCH	TAL	IOW	CLT	DOV	MCH; 18	CHI	DAY	KEN; 6	NHA	IND; 4	IOW	GLN; 9	MOH	BRI	ROA; 1	DAR; 25	RCH	CHI; 4	KEN	DOV	CLT	KAN	TEX	PHO	HOM			88th	0^{1}	
2016	Richard Childress Racing	2	Chevy	DAY	ATL; 4	LVS	PHO	CAL	TEX	BRI	RCH	TAL	DOV; 29	CLT	POC; 7	MCH; 3	IOW	DAY	KEN	NHA	IND; 3	IOW	GLN; 2	MOH	BRI	ROA	DAR; 20	RCH	CHI; 9	KEN	DOV	CLT	KAN	TEX	PHO	HOM			95th	0^{1}	
2017	Richard Childress Racing	2	Chevy	DAY	ATL	LVS	PHO	CAL; 36	TEX	BRI	RCH	TAL	CLT	DOV	POC; 31	MCH; 7	IOW	DAY	KEN; 34	NHA	IND; 2	IOW	GLN; 5	MOH	BRI	ROA	DAR	RCH; 19	CHI	KEN	DOV	CLT	KAN	TEX	PHO	HOM			96th	0^{1}	
2018	Team Penske	22	Ford	DAY	ATL	LVS	PHO	CAL	TEX	BRI	RCH	TAL	DOV	CLT	POC; 8	MCH; 5	IOW	CHI; 8	DAY	KEN; 9	NHA	IOW	GLN	MOH	BRI	ROA	DAR	IND	LVS	RCH	CLT	DOV	KAN	TEX	PHO	HOM			98th	0^{1}	
2019	Team Penske	12	Ford	DAY	ATL	LVS	PHO	CAL	TEX	BRI	RCH	TAL	DOV	CLT	POC	**MCH**; 4*	IOW	CHI	DAY	KEN	NHA; 5	IOW	GLN	MOH	BRI	ROA	DAR	IND	LVS	RCH	CLT	DOV	KAN	TEX	PHO	HOM			84th	0^{1}	
^{†} - Qualified for Michael Waltrip

==== Camping World Truck Series ====
NASCAR Camping World Truck Series results
Year	Team	No.	Make	1	2	3	4	5	6	7	8	9	10	11	12	13	14	15	16	17	18	19	20	21	22	23	24	25	NCWTC	Pts	Ref
2003	Andy Petree Racing	33	Chevy	DAY	DAR	MMR	MAR	CLT	DOV	TEX	MEM	MLW; 11	KAN; 8	KEN	GTW; 21	MCH	IRP	NSH	BRI; 21	RCH	NHA	CAL	LVS	SBO; 21	TEX	MAR	PHO	HOM	42nd	572	
2007	Billy Ballew Motorsports	51	Chevy	DAY	CAL	ATL	MAR; 33	KAN	CLT	MFD	DOV	TEX	MCH	MLW	MEM	KEN	IRP	NSH	BRI	GTW	NHA	LVS	TAL	MAR	ATL	TEX	PHO	HOM	104th	64	
2021	ThorSport Racing	66	Toyota	DAY	DAY	LVS	ATL	BRI	RCH	KAN	DAR	COA; 11	CLT	TEX	NSH	POC	KNX	GLN; 8	GTW	DAR	BRI	LVS	TAL	MAR	PHO				45th	59	

=== ARCA Re/Max Series ===
(key) (Bold – Pole position awarded by qualifying time. Italics – Pole position earned by points standings or practice time. * – Most laps led.)

ARCA Re/Max Series results
Year	Team	No.	Make	1	2	3	4	5	6	7	8	9	10	11	12	13	14	15	16	17	18	19	20	21	22	23	ARMC	Pts	Ref
2003	Andy Petree Racing	33	Chevy	DAY	ATL	NSH	SLM; 4	TOL	KEN	CLT; 34	BLN	KAN	MCH	LER	POC	POC	NSH	ISF	**WIN**; 26	DSF	CHI	SLM	TAL; DNQ				43rd	660	
2003	Andy Petree Racing	26	Chevy																				TAL; 1*	CLT	SBO		43rd	660	
2004	Andy Petree Racing	33	Chevy	DAY; 35	NSH	SLM	KEN	TOL	CLT	KAN	POC	MCH	SBO	BLN	KEN	GTW	POC	LER	NSH	ISF	TOL	DSF	CHI	SLM	TAL		172nd	70	
2007	Dale Earnhardt, Inc.	15	Chevy	DAY	USA	NSH	SLM	KAN	WIN	KEN	TOL	IOW	POC; 35	MCH	BLN	KEN	POC	NSH	ISF	MIL	GTW	DSF	CHI	SLM	TAL	TOL	175th	55	
2009	Kimmel Racing	98	Ford	DAY	SLM	CAR	TAL	KEN	TOL; 4	POC	MCH	MFD	IOW	KEN	BLN	POC	ISF	CHI	TOL	DSF	NJE	SLM	KAN	CAR			105th	210	

^{*} Season still in progress
^{1} Ineligible for series points

=== 24 Hours of Daytona Results ===
Year	Team	Co-drivers	Car	Class	Laps	Pos.	Class Pos.
2003	(United States) Flis Motorsports	(United States) Doug Goad (United States) Paul Mears Jr. (United States) Jim Briody	Chevrolet Corvette	GTS	542	21st	6th
2004	(United States) Orison-Planet Earth Motorsports	(United States) Joe Nonnamaker (United States) Will Nonnamaker (United States) Charlie Menard (United States) Wayne Nonnamaker	Porsche GT3 Cup	SGS	493	15th	4th
2010	(United States) Spirit of Daytona Racing	(Spain) Antonio Garcia (United Kingdom) Darren Manning (United States) Buddy Rice	Coyote CC/09-Porsche	DP	346	32nd	13th

Achievements
Preceded by Jamie McMurray	Brickyard 400 winner 2011	Succeeded by Jimmie Johnson
