= Menards =

American home improvement chain

Menard, Inc.

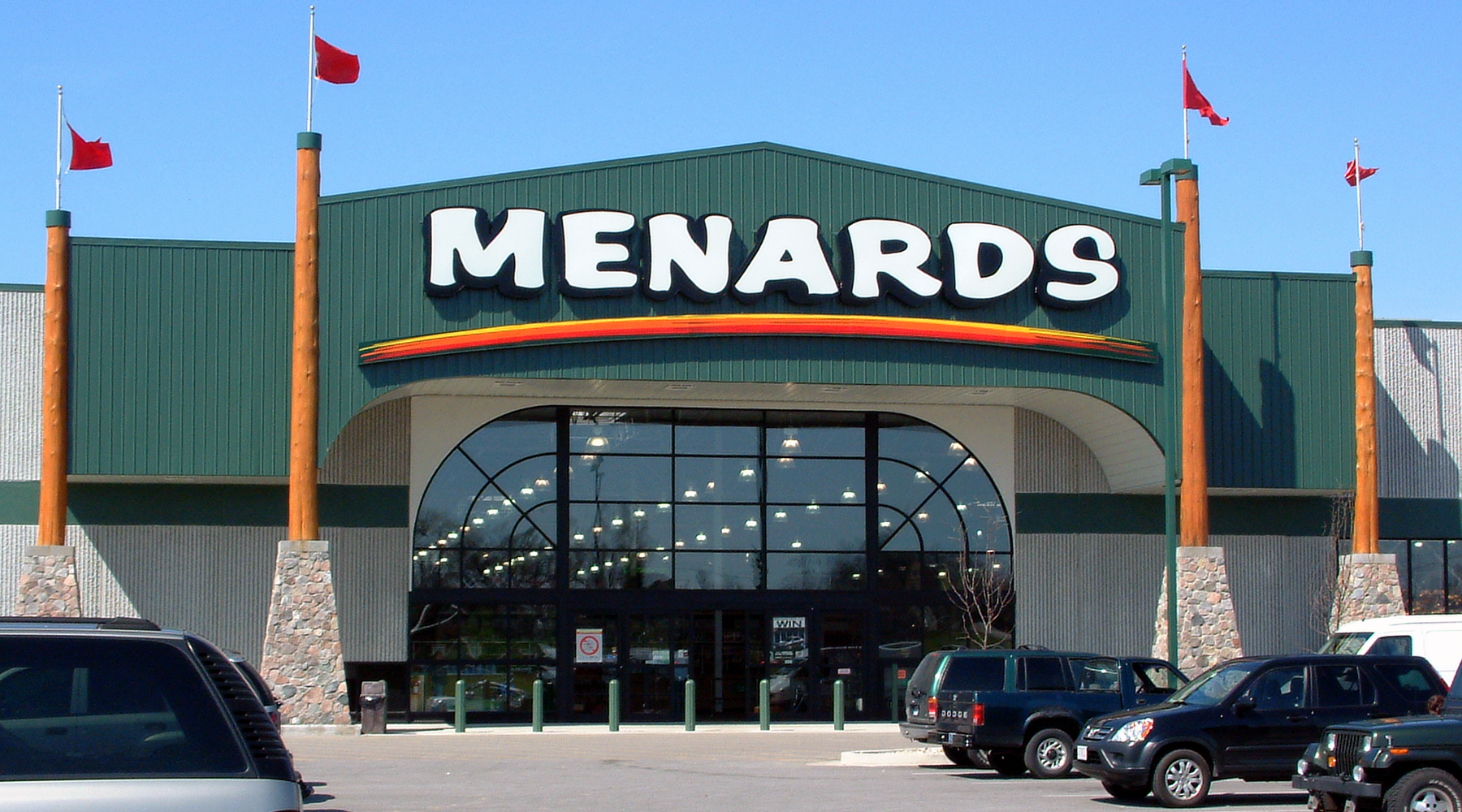
- A Menards store in West Lafayette, Indiana
- Trade name: Menards
- Type: Private
- Industry: Retail (home improvement)
- Founded: 1960; 66 years ago
- Founder: John Menard Jr.
- Headquarters: Eau Claire, Wisconsin, US
- Number of locations: 341 stores and 15 distribution centers (as of March 2026)
- Key people: John Menard Jr. (president); Paul Menard (Member Board of Directors); Charlie Menard (Chief Operating Officer)
- Products: Building materials, tools, hardware, garden supplies, electrical supplies, ceiling fans, light fixtures, cabinets, home appliances, doors, windows, paint, wood stain, wallpaper, plumbing supplies, toilets, carpet, vinyl, linoleum, groceries, pet food, automotive, propane
- Revenue: ▲US$13 billion (2022)
- Number of employees: 45,000 (2020)
- Website: www.menards.com

Menard, Inc., doing business as Menards (/məˈnɑːrdz/ mə-NARDZ), is an American big-box home improvement retail chain headquartered in Eau Claire, Wisconsin. It is the third-largest home improvement retailer in the United States (behind Lowe's and Home Depot), with 341 stores in 15 U.S. states, primarily in the Midwest. The chain is privately owned by its founder, John Menard Jr.

== History ==
=== 20th century ===
In 1958, John Menard Jr. began building post-frame buildings to finance his college education. By the end of 1959, he found it necessary to hire extra crews, and to purchase more pieces of equipment to keep up with demand. After graduating from the Wisconsin State College at Eau Claire (now University of Wisconsin–Eau Claire) in 1962, Menard purchased land in Eau Claire, Wisconsin and built an office and shop. The company was founded in 1960 and incorporated in 1962. The first Menards hardware store opened in 1964. By opening a truss plant in the late 1960s, Menards grew to produce more substantial building materials on-site. The truss plant evolved into the Menard Building Division, which produced steel siding and roofing, interior and exterior doors, decking and treated lumber, and other materials. Between the 1970s and 1980s Menards began opening locations in Iowa, Minnesota, North Dakota and South Dakota. The company expanded into Nebraska in 1990, Illinois in 1991 and Indiana and Michigan in 1992. Menards sold the Menard Building Division in 1994, racking up 36 years in the pole building industry.

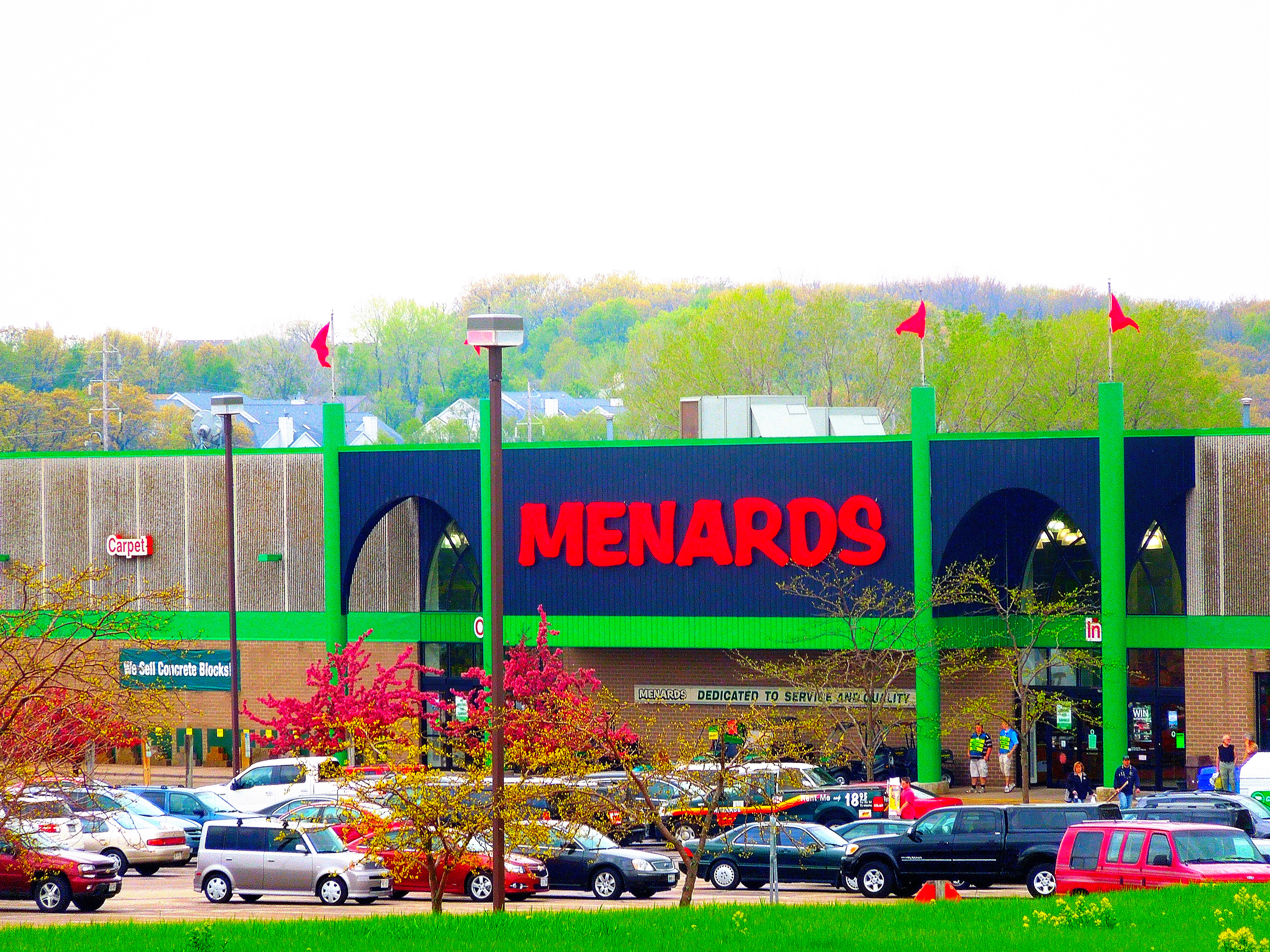
Menards in East Madison, Wisconsin, pictured in 2012 (closed and relocated to Sun Prairie in 2018)

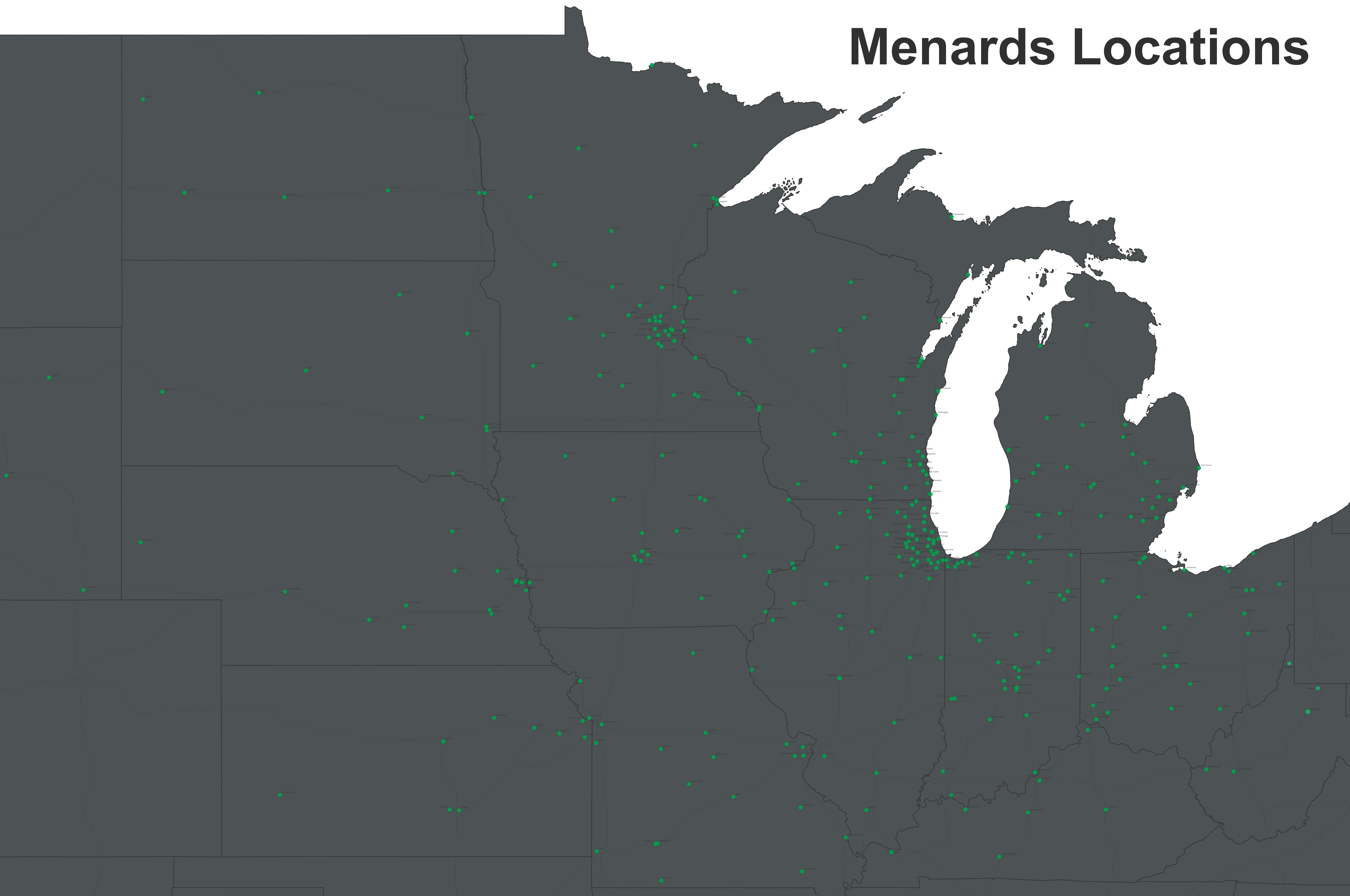
Menards locations

Menards was founded as Menard Cashway Lumber. In 1984, the "Cashway Lumber" name was dropped and the business became simply known to this day as Menards (though it was spelled with an apostrophe-s well into the 1980s).

=== 21st century ===
In 2000, the company opened its 150th store. During the early and mid 2000s, Menards expanded into Ohio.

The first Missouri Menards store opened in October 2006 in St. Joseph. In 2007, Menards opened its third and fourth distribution centers in Holiday City, Ohio, and Shelby, Iowa, which are 669,000 square feet (62,200 m^{2}) and 735,000 square feet (68,300 m^{2}), respectively. In 2008, the company expanded further into the United States Mid-south in Missouri. In 2009, Menards opened its first Wyoming location in Casper. Then it was followed by another location in Gillette and one more in Cheyenne. In 2011, the company expanded into Kansas. In 2012, Menards opened its first Kentucky location in Owensboro. Six more locations opened in Kentucky; one in Louisville, another in Paducah, another in Elizabethtown, another in Florence, another in Bowling Green, and the last one in Richmond.

In 2020, Menards expanded into West Virginia, opening four locations in that state: one in Wheeling, another in Morgantown, another in Barboursville and the last one in Bridgeport. There will be a fifth Menards in West Virginia in Parkersburg, followed by a sixth location in Charleston.

A fifth manufacturing and distribution center in Ravenna, Ohio began construction in Spring 2022 after a two-year-long delay. The distribution center in Ravenna will supplement the chain's expansion into Northeast Ohio and Western Pennsylvania. Menards announced in 2022 that it would open its first Pennsylvania location in Washington. A second Menards in Uniontown has been delayed.

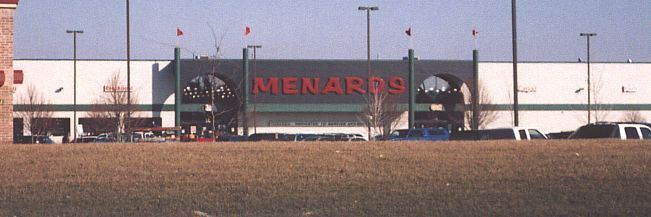
An example of the older exterior of the Menards store in Ankeny, Iowa

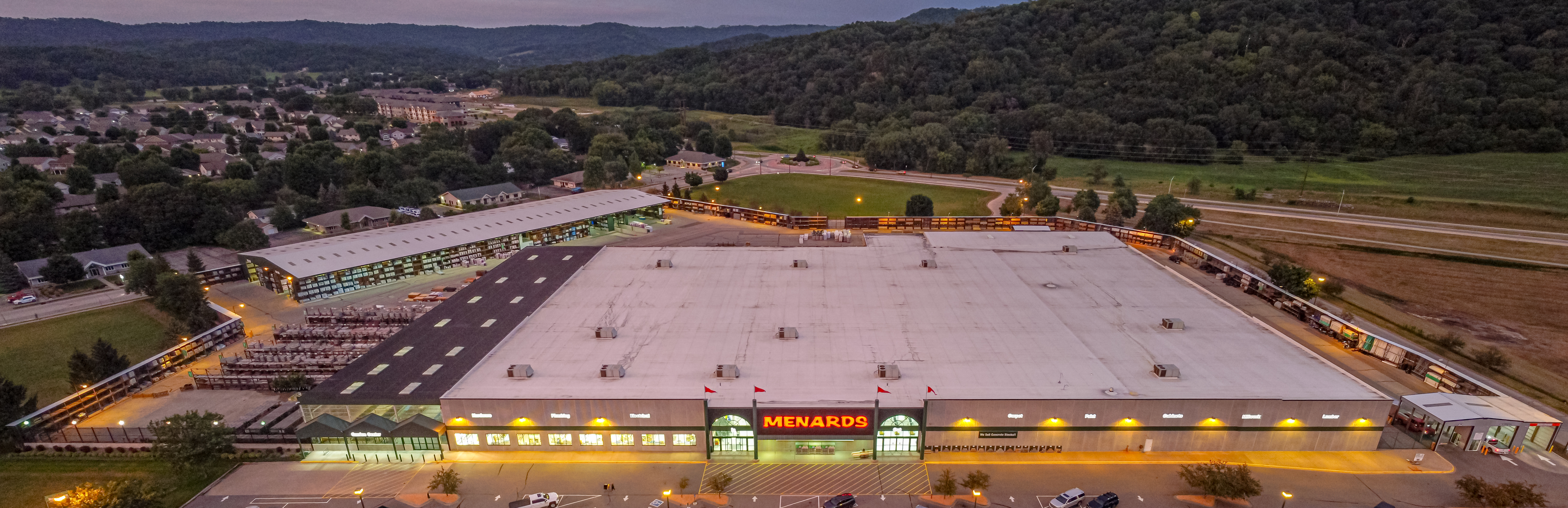
A Menards store in Onalaska, Wisconsin

== Groceries ==
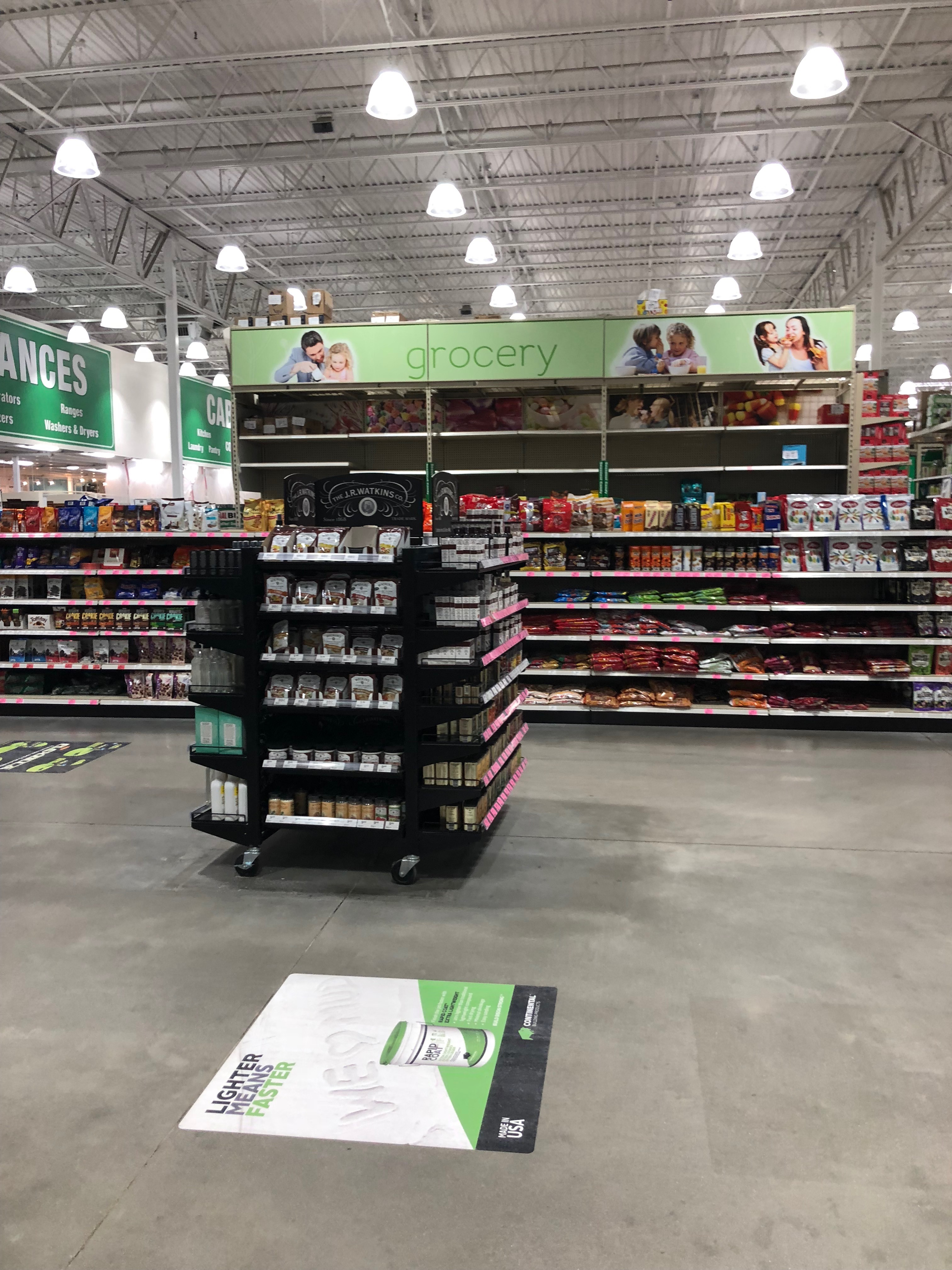
Grocery section of a Menards store in Traverse City, Michigan

In 2007, the 240,000 sq ft (22,000 m^{2}) and larger Menards stores began selling groceries. At such locations, shoppers are able to purchase items such as frozen pizza, milk, eggs, common snacks, and a variety of canned items. In addition, these Menards locations carry items such as office supplies, pet supplies, and mattresses.

== Advertising ==
Menards publishes weekly print ads and broadcasts TV and radio ads. Radio and TV ads are usually accompanied by banjo music (resembling that of bluegrass music) played by Gary Shaw of Appleton, Wisconsin. The first Menards jingle in the 1970s was an upbeat disco music-like tune with a piano ditty. The jingle changed to a banjo track in 1981. Ray Szmanda was the "Menards Guy" who used the slogan "Save big money at Menards" regularly on television advertisements from 1976 to 1998, and occasionally from 1999 until his death in 2018. Before his return in 1999, Kim Larsen took over his position in his absence. During the Christmas and holiday season, radio and television ads typically feature an alternative jingle "Warm season's greetings to you all from Menards!" sung by a female chorus beginning in 1986. That same year, the "Helping You Build America’s Heartland" jingle (which was an upbeat electronic synthesizer-heavy track) was made. In 1990, the company reverted to the banjo music and "Save Big Money at Menards" jingle, which has been nicknamed the "Midwest National Anthem". Robert (Bob) Holtan from WAXX/WAYY Radio in Eau Claire, WI, wrote the lyrics to the "Save Big Money" jingle in the early 1970s. Holtan was friends with John Menard and was also a DJ working at WAXX/WAYY Radio in Eau Claire, WI at the time. Spanish language commercials (whose music contains a mixture of mariachi and banjo sounds) conclude with the tagline "¡Ahorrar mucho dinero en Menards!"

=== Auto racing ===
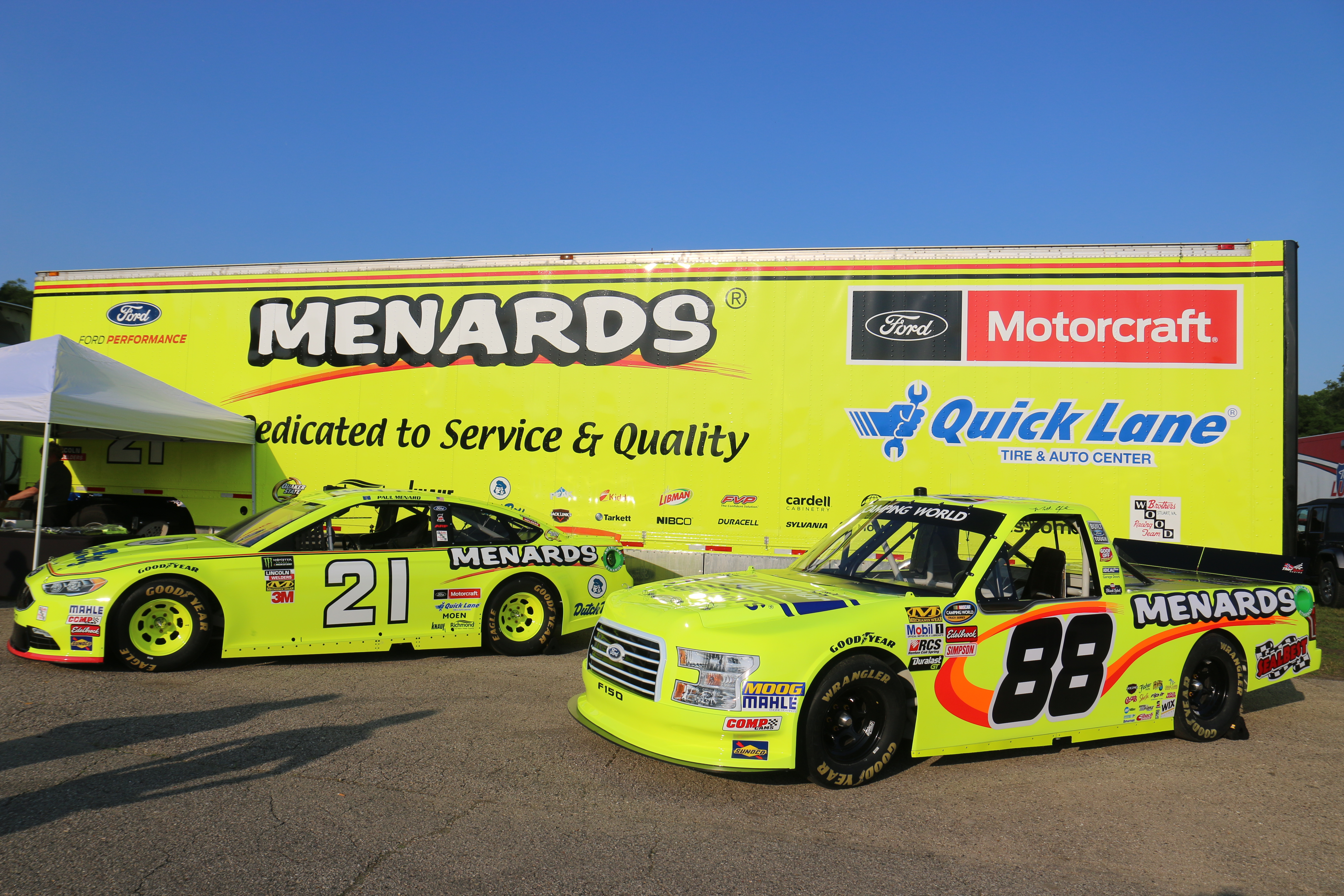
Menards NASCAR display

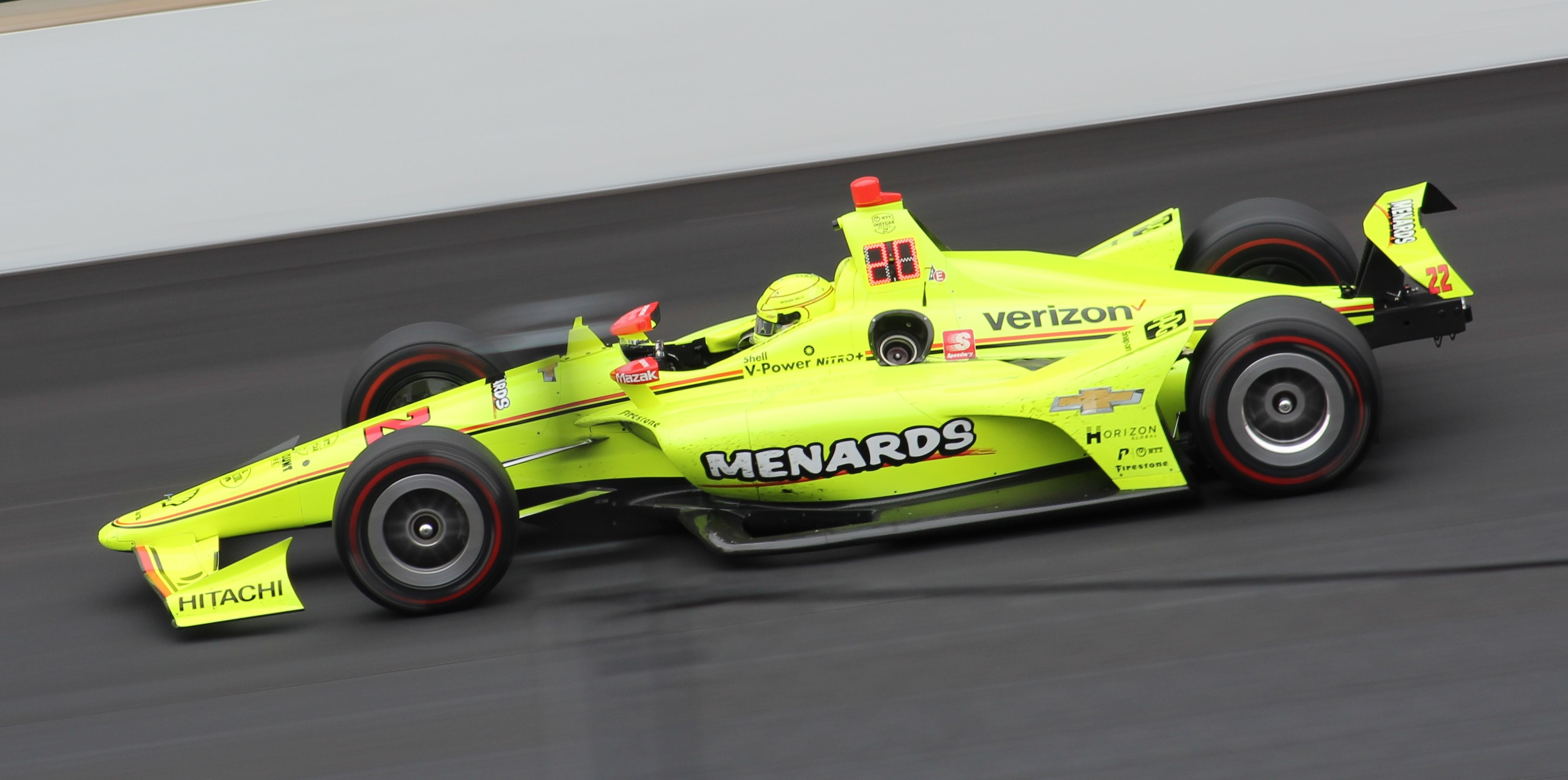
Menards sponsoring Simon Pagenaud in IndyCar, 2019

John Menard got involved in Indycar racing in the early 1980s working with his neighbor, driver Herm Johnson. Menard eventually owned cars, primarily focusing on the Indianapolis 500 often using stock block Buick V6 engines. When Buick left the sport, Menard bought the engine tooling from Buick and began producing the engines under the Menard V6 name. Driver Scott Brayton won two consecutive Indy 500 poles for Menard, but was killed in a practice crash before the 1996 500. Tony Stewart got his first Indy 500 starts for Menard, and in 1992 Al Unser Sr. scored the highest Indy 500 finish for the team (3rd) and the highest ever 500 finish for the Buick/Menard V6 engine. Menards has supported several racing drivers, including Paul Menard (John Menard's son) who won his only NASCAR Cup race in the 2011 Brickyard 400 in a Menards sponsored Richard Childress Chevrolet; Robby Gordon; P. J. Jones; Brandon Jones; Matt Crafton; Simon Pagenaud, Ryan Blaney and Matt DiBenedetto. Menards began sponsoring Team Penske in 2016. Menards has also become the title sponsor of races in the Xfinity Series and as the entitlement sponsor for the ARCA Racing Series.

In 2023, the Menards and Matt Crafton sponsorship partnership surpassed STP and Richard Petty as NASCAR's longest-tenured driver/sponsorship relationship.

== Industry rankings ==
In 2021, Menards ranked 26th on Forbes’ list of "America's Largest Private Companies", with an estimated revenue of US$11.8 billion. In 2022, Menards ranked 34th on the National Retail Federation's list of "100 Top Retailers".

In 2022, Menards ranked second in a J.D. Power survey in customer satisfaction among home improvement retail stores. Subsequently in J.D. Power's 2024 survey, Menards ranked first, with the highest customer satisfaction of national home improvement retail stores.

In 2022, Menards ranked 28th on Forbes' list of "America's Largest Private Companies" with an estimated revenue of US$13 billion.

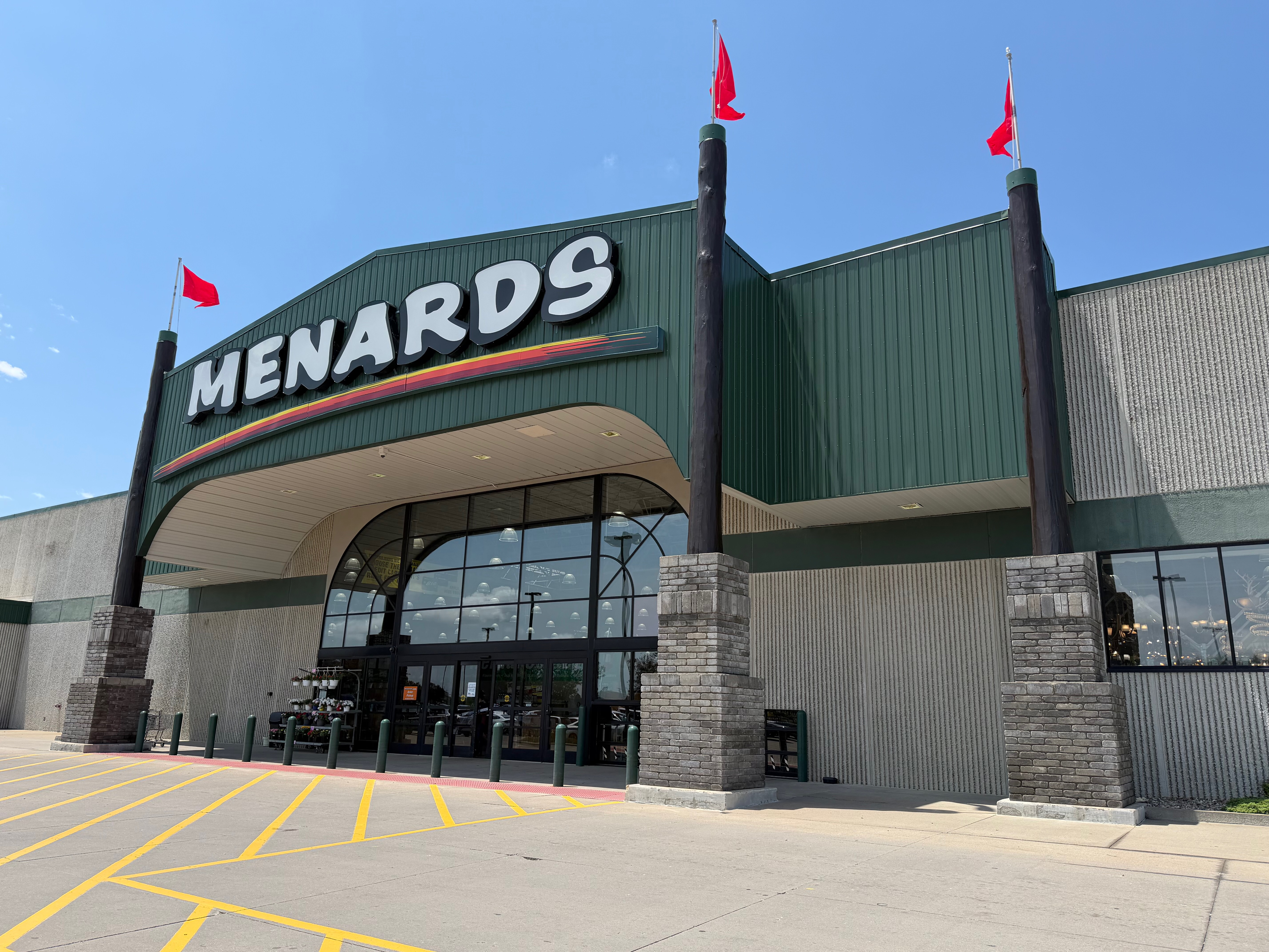
A Menards location in Salina, Kansas in June 2026.

== Controversies ==
According to Milwaukee Magazine in 2007, Menards was cited with more regulatory violations involving air/water pollution and hazardous waste disposal than any other company in Wisconsin. It also alleges that the company is strongly anti-union, to the point that it will not hire anyone who has ever worked in a union shop, even if they did so while in their teen years.

During the COVID-19 pandemic, Michigan's Attorney General Dana Nessel sent Menards a cease and desist letter citing 18 complaints from consumers in regards to price gouging on products such as face masks and bleach. "Big box stores are not immune to the Michigan Consumer Protection Act or the Governor's Executive Order", Nessel said. "Large corporations must also play by the rules, and my office will work diligently to ensure this state's consumers are treated fairly and not abused by businesses seeking to unlawfully jack prices up to line their pockets with profits at the expense of the public during this time of great need." Nessel said that Menards would have 10 days to respond to the letter, or she would potentially take legal action.

During the early stages of the pandemic, Menards instituted a policy that prohibited children under age 16 in stores, to the frustration of single parents who do not have other childcare options. The policy for children was later relaxed.

== Gallery ==
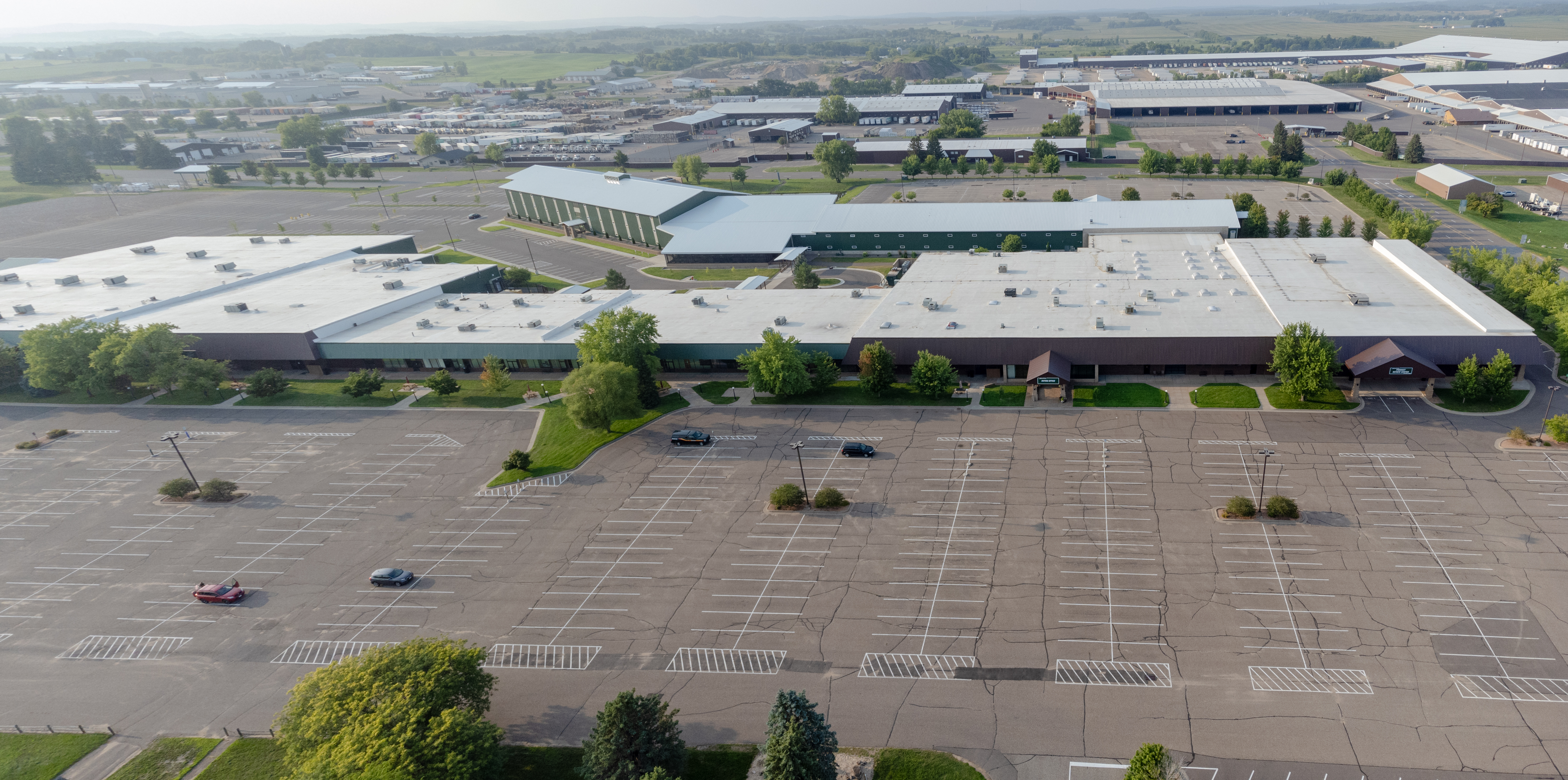
Menards Headquarters
Eau Claire, Wisconsin

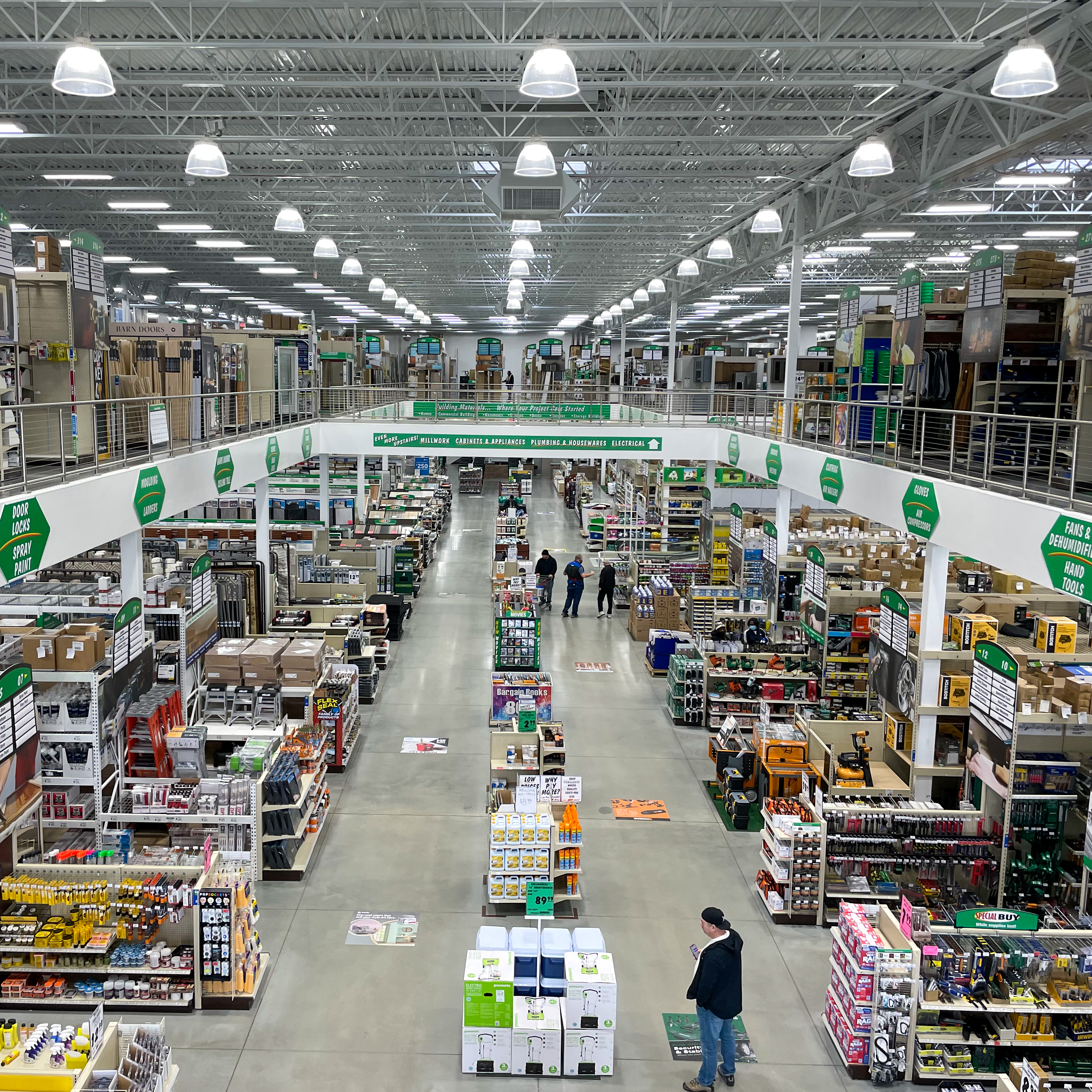
A Menards store with two floors

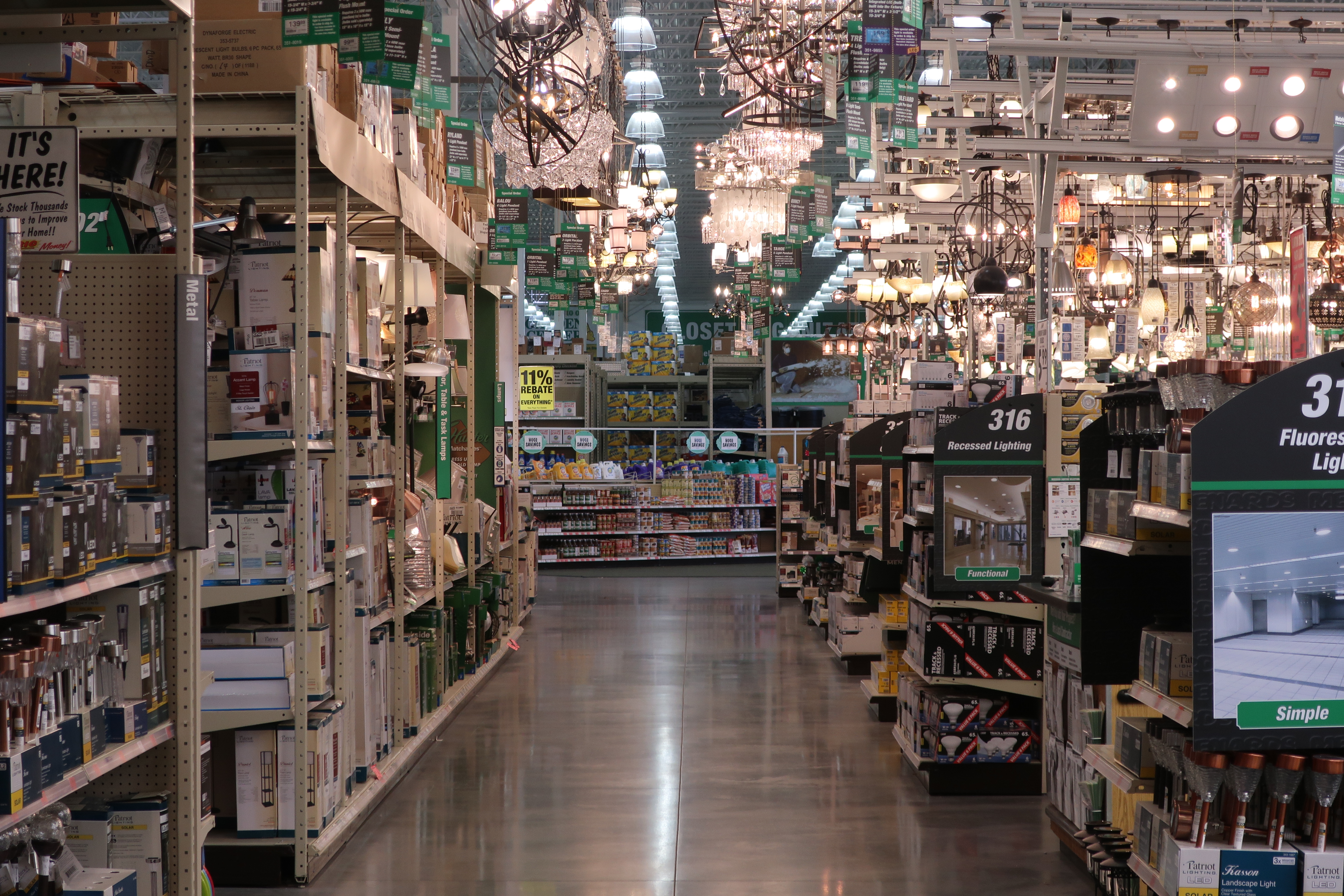
Menards light department

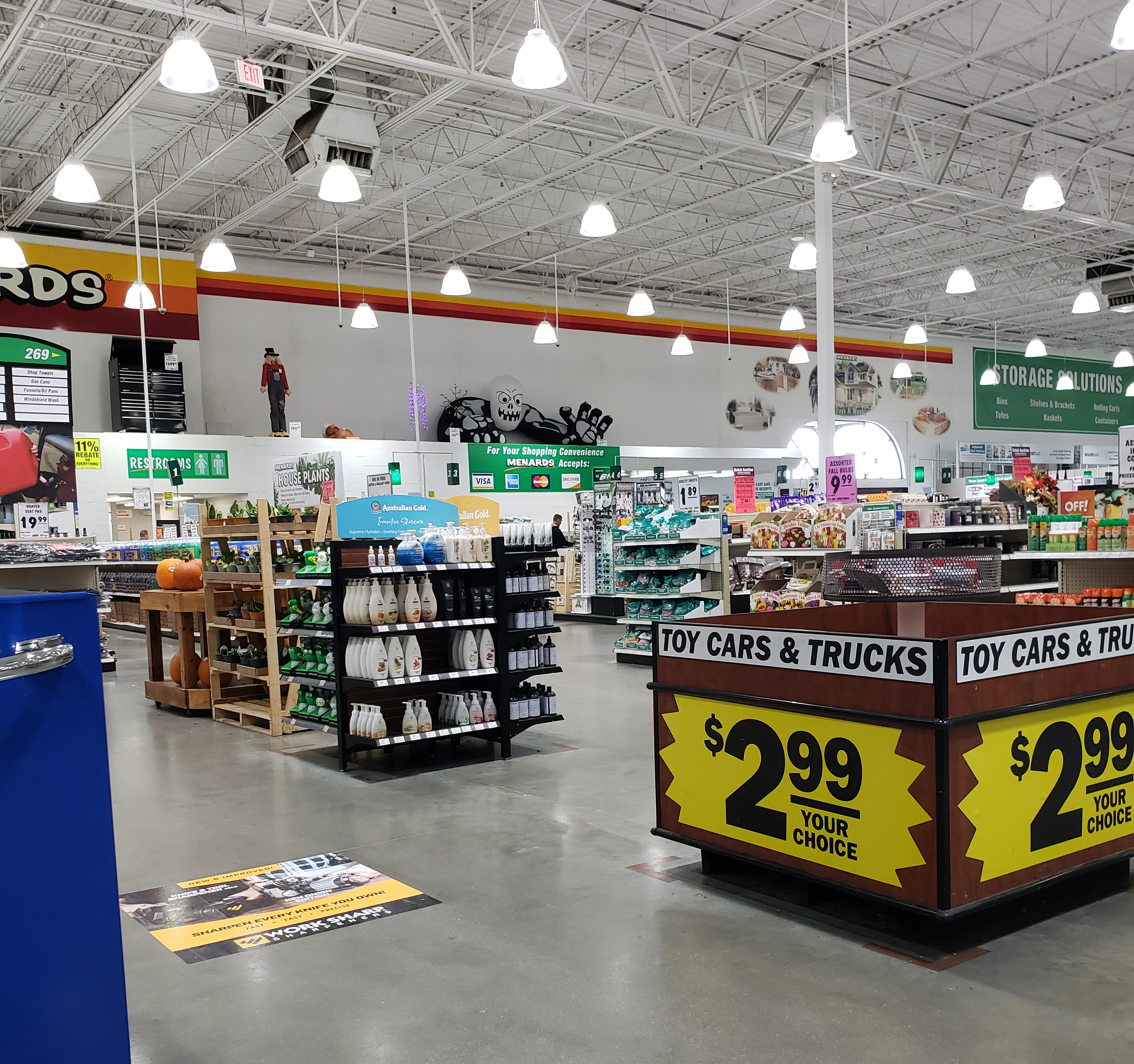
Inside the store

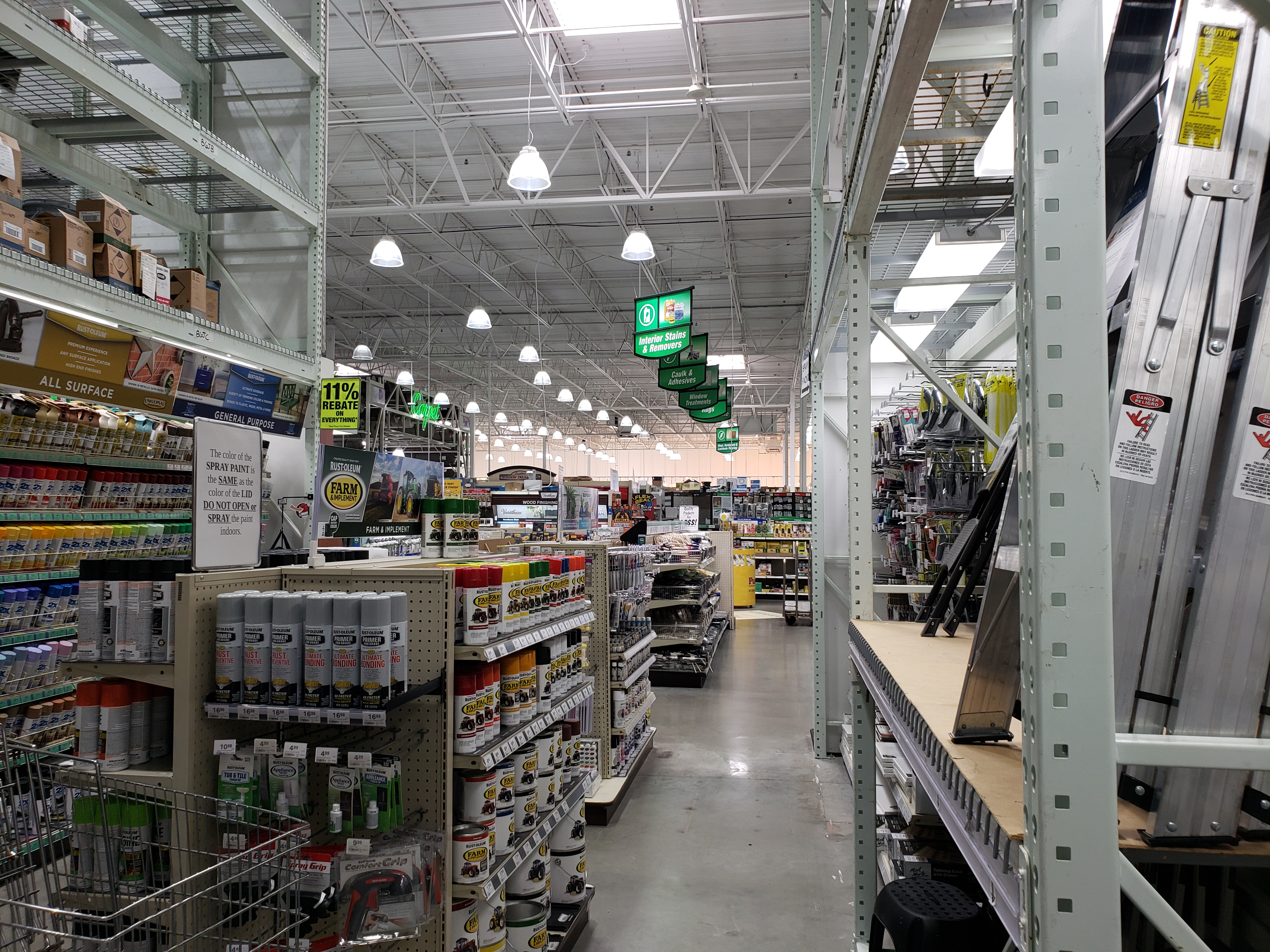
Inside the store
