= John Menard Jr. =

American businessman (born 1940)

John Menard
- Born: John Robert Menard Jr. January 22, 1940 (age 86); Eau Claire, Wisconsin, U.S.
- Education: University of Wisconsin, Eau Claire (BA)
- Occupation: Businessman
- Known for: Founder of Menards
- Title: President, Menards
- Children: 6, including Paul

John Robert Menard Jr. (born January 22, 1940) is an American billionaire businessman who is the founder and owner of Menards, a Midwestern chain of home improvement stores. He is a former IndyCar racing team owner, and the father of former NASCAR Cup Series driver Paul Menard.

As of June 2026, Bloomberg Billionaires Index ranked him as the 147th richest person in the world with an estimated net worth of US $18.9 billion. Menard is ranked 141 on the Forbes list of The World's Billionaires with an estimated net worth of $19.4 billion.

== Life and education ==
The oldest of eight siblings in a Catholic family with German, French-Canadian, and Norwegian roots, His father, John Menard Sr., was a university professor while his mother, Rosemary, was a grade school teacher. Menard attended Eau Claire Regis High School. He graduated from the University of Wisconsin–Eau Claire with a degree in business and a minor in psychology. After graduating, he passed up working for IBM to continue his own small farm construction business.

Menard began his career constructing pole buildings with friends from college. He made his home in Eau Claire, Wisconsin. Menard has six children, and married his third wife, Faiha Obaid, in 2008. In 1997, Menard was caught using his own pickup truck to haul plastic bags filled with chromium and arsenic-laden wood ash to his home for disposal with his household trash. Menard pleaded no contest to felony and misdemeanor charges involving records violations, unlawful transportation, and improper disposal of hazardous waste. Menard and his company were fined $1.7 million for 21 violations.

In 2013 the IRS ordered Menard to pay $6 million in back taxes after he allegedly mischaracterized $20 million as salary, not dividends, deducting it as a business expense. In a separate case, the Wisconsin Supreme Court forced Menard to pay $1.6 million to a former legal counsel to compensate for gender discrimination and gross underpayment. In 2002, Menard paid more than $216 million tax for his $559 million income.

In April 2020, Menard was among several businessmen named to the economic advisory group established by President Donald Trump.

== Menards ==
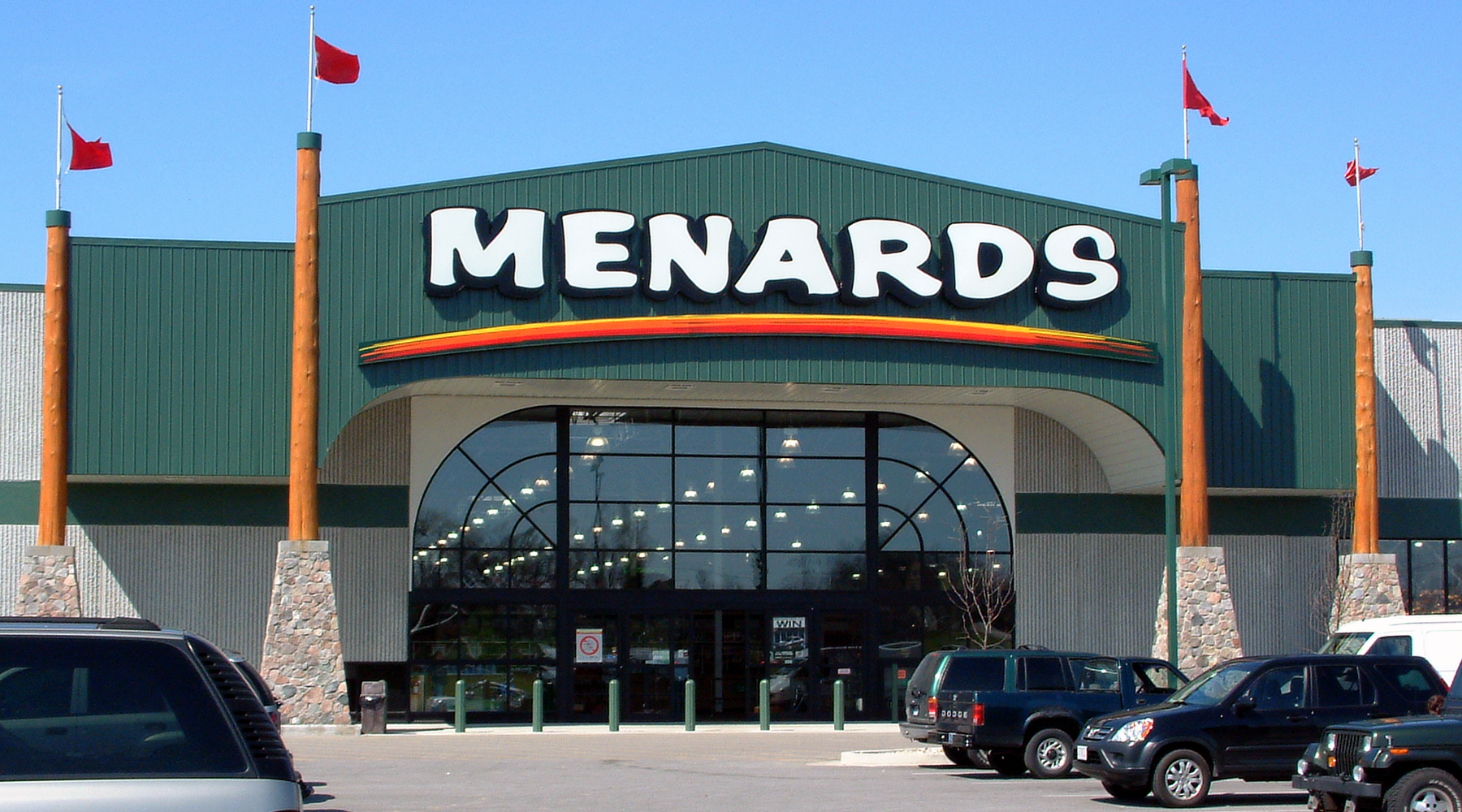
Menards store in Lafayette, Indiana

Menard opened his first hardware store in 1964. As of 2021, his company owned 335 Menards stores and 12 distribution centers. As of 2005, Menards grossed an estimated $5.5 billion in sales. Menard had a net worth of $17.5 billion in 2026, according to Forbes, and is the second richest person in Wisconsin after Diane Hendricks.

In 2013, Menard ousted a former investment partner, Stephen Hilbert, a 20% shareholder in MH Equity, for mismanaging assets and resources.

Menard has a pronounced hostility towards organized labor. He imposed an absolute ban on hiring anyone who had ever belonged to a union. Managers at Menards are subject to 60% pay cuts if their store becomes unionized. Managers also have to agree to pay fines of $100 per minute for infractions such as opening late and to submit any disputes to arbitration rather than legal courts.

== Motorsports involvement ==
Menard began sponsoring an Indycar in the late '70s with his fellow Eau Claire native Herm Johnson, then launched his own team that competed regularly in the Indianapolis 500. The team used the production-based Buick V6 turbo engine, which Menard eventually took over development of. When Tony George began the Indy Racing League, Menard's team competed full-time in the series. They won IRL championships in 1997 with Tony Stewart and in 1999 with Greg Ray.

Paul Menard, John Jr.'s son, raced sixteen years in the NASCAR Cup Series, winning the 2011 Brickyard 400. Menard also owns an engine shop in the United Kingdom that produced engines for Team Menard and Robby Gordon Motorsports.

Menards is a primary sponsor of the Team Penske #2 Ford Mustang. They are also primary sponsors of his teammate in the #12 Mustang Ryan Blaney in the NASCAR Cup Series. In the NASCAR Xfinity Series, Menards sponsors the Joe Gibbs Racing #20 Toyota Supra with driver Brandon Jones. In the Craftsman Truck Series, Menards sponsors the ThorSport Racing #88 Ford with driver Matt Crafton. Menards was a former partner of Robby Gordon, Dale Earnhardt Jr., and Martin Truex Jr. across various series.

Menard also sponsored Frank Kimmel for several years in the ARCA RE/MAX Series. After RE/MAX declined to renew their sponsorship, Menards took over as title sponsor, renaming the series the ARCA Menards Series.

Menards-sponsored cars are easily recognizable on tracks, as they are typically painted with a fluorescent yellow livery.

== Donations ==
In January 2008, Menard gave $15 million to support Eau Claire's Luther Midelfort Hospital. The donation was used for a new emergency services department and to help the hospital educate and train health professionals. In 2015, Menard donated $10 million to support the Eau Claire Area YMCA. The gift helped replace the five-court LE Phillips Tennis Center that opened in 1972 to become an eight-court indoor tennis center known as the John and Fay Menard YMCA Tennis Center. In 2019, The Menard family donated $5 million to the Drug Enforcement and Policy Center at Ohio State University's Moritz College of Law. In addition to supporting the center's research, engagement, and student enrichment, the donation also supports an endowed lecture and an annual national conference.

A supporter of conservative causes, Menard has donated to the political groups of the Koch brothers.
